= 2016–17 Combined Counties Football League =

The 2016–17 Combined Counties Football League season (known as the 2016–17 Cherry Red Records Combined Counties Football League for sponsorship reasons) was the 39th in the history of the Combined Counties Football League, a football competition in England.

The league constitution was announced on 17 May 2016. The season began on 2 August and concluded in May 2017.

== Premier Division ==
Combined Counties Football League Premier Division
- Season: 2016–17
- Champions: Hartley Wintney
- Promoted: Hartley Wintney
- Relegated: Badshot Lea; Bedfont & Feltham; Raynes Park Vale
- Matches: 506
- Goals: 1,724 (3.41 per match)

The Premier Division was increased from 22 to 23 clubs, and featured five new teams after the promotion of Ashford Town to the Southern League, and the relegation of Chessington & Hook United, Cove and Redhill to Division One:

- Abbey Rangers, promoted as third-placed club in Division One.
- Bedfont & Feltham, promoted as runners-up in Division One.
- CB Hounslow United, promoted as champions of Division One.
- Walton & Hersham, relegated from the Isthmian League.

In June 2016, North Greenford United, relegated from the Southern Football League, successfully appealed against their placement in the Hellenic Football League following relegation from the Southern Football League, and were placed in the Combined Counties Premier Division.

Camberley Town, Epsom & Ewell, Hartley Wintney, Walton & Hersham and Westfield applied for promotion to Step 4 for 2017–18.

=== League table ===
Pos	Team	Pld	W	D	L	GF	GA	GD	Pts	Promotion or relegation
1	Hartley Wintney	44	35	6	3	131	41	+90	111	Promoted to the Southern League East Division
2	Westfield	44	28	9	7	106	52	+54	93	
3	Hanworth Villa	44	24	9	11	73	47	+26	81	
4	Epsom & Ewell	44	23	10	11	90	57	+33	79	
5	Walton & Hersham	44	21	15	8	70	42	+28	78	
6	Camberley Town	44	22	6	16	84	58	+26	72	
7	Horley Town	44	21	7	16	89	67	+22	70	
8	Bedfont Sports	44	17	13	14	78	80	−2	64	
9	Spelthorne Sports	44	18	9	17	80	76	+4	63	
10	Abbey Rangers	44	17	12	15	71	73	−2	63	
11	Windsor	44	17	10	17	78	71	+7	61	Transferred to the Hellenic League
12	Knaphill	44	18	6	20	83	81	+2	60	
13	Sutton Common Rovers	44	18	5	21	64	72	−8	59	
14	North Greenford United	44	16	10	18	83	78	+5	58	
15	Colliers Wood United	44	15	11	18	75	80	−5	56	
16	Guildford City	44	15	8	21	78	86	−8	53	
17	A.F.C. Hayes	44	14	9	21	64	82	−18	51	
18	Farnham Town	44	14	7	23	59	83	−24	49	
19	Chertsey Town	44	14	7	23	55	91	−36	49	
20	CB Hounslow United	44	14	5	25	55	85	−30	47	
21	Badshot Lea	44	11	6	27	61	113	−52	39	Relegated to Division One
22	Bedfont & Feltham	44	9	7	28	54	118	−64	34	Relegated to Division One
23	Raynes Park Vale	44	7	9	28	43	91	−48	30	Relegated to Division One

Source: FA Full-Time CCL Prem Div Table
Rules for classification: 1) points; 2) goal difference; 3) number of goals scored.

== Division One ==
Combined Counties Football League Division One
- Season: 2016–17
- Champions: Banstead Athletic
- Promoted: Banstead Athletic; Redhill; Balham
- Relegated: Epsom Athletic
- Matches: 306
- Goals: 1,322 (4.32 per match)

Division One was increased from 17 to 18 clubs, and featured six new teams after CB Hounslow United, Bedfont & Feltham and Abbey Rangers were promoted to the Premier Division, Dorking Wanderers Reserves left the league, and Sandhurst Town transferred to the Hellenic League:

- AC London, transferred from the Kent Invicta League.
- Bagshot, promoted from the Aldershot & District League.
- Balham, promoted from the Surrey Elite Intermediate League.
- Chessington & Hook United, relegated from the Premier Division.
- Cove, relegated from the Premier Division.
- Redhill, relegated from the Premier Division.
- Reserve sides are not eligible for promotion to Step 5.

The season began on 6 August 2016 with Ash United and Frimley Green accruing the first points on the board with a 1–1 draw at Young's Drive, Ash. Frimley Green were deducted the point they earned from this match when it transpired that they had fielded an ineligible player.

Two matches remained unplayed because the visiting clubs were unable to raise teams.

=== League table ===
Pos	Team	Pld	W	D	L	GF	GA	GD	Pts	Promotion or relegation
1	Banstead Athletic	34	25	6	3	117	34	+83	81	Promoted to the Premier Division
2	Redhill	34	23	4	7	106	35	+71	73	Promoted to the Premier Division
3	Balham	34	20	7	7	104	52	+52	67	Promoted to the Premier Division
4	Worcester Park	34	21	2	11	93	53	+40	68 (Note: Worcester Park were awarded three points when Bagshot failed to raise a team for their match on 18 March.)	
5	Chessington & Hook United	34	19	7	8	72	43	+29	64	
6	Eversley & California	34	19	5	10	90	69	+21	62	
7	AC London	34	18	12	4	93	40	+53	63 (Note: AC London were deducted six points on 21 November for fielding an ineligible player. They were later awarded three points when Epsom Athletic failed to raise a team for their match on 8 April.)	
8	Bagshot	34	19	3	12	91	74	+17	60	
9	Sheerwater	34	16	4	14	64	75	−11	52	
10	Staines Lammas	34	14	7	13	56	51	+5	49	
11	Cobham	34	15	3	16	64	64	0	48	
12	Ash United	34	13	5	16	62	78	−16	44	
13	Frimley Green	34	10	9	15	57	56	+1	38 (Note: Frimley Green were deducted one point for fielding an ineligible player at Ash United on 6 August.)	
14	South Park Reserves	34	7	8	19	64	103	−39	29	
15	Dorking	34	7	4	23	48	87	−39	25	Folded at the end of the season
16	Farleigh Rovers	34	6	5	23	65	123	−58	23	
17	Cove	34	4	5	25	57	124	−67	17 (Note: Cove were reprieved from relegation.)	
18	Epsom Athletic	34	2	0	32	19	161	−142	6	Relegated to the Surrey South Eastern Combination

Source: FA Full-Time CCL Div One Table
Rules for classification: 1) points; 2) goal difference; 3) number of goals scored.
