= 2012–13 Combined Counties Football League =

The 2012–13 Combined Counties Football League season (known as the 2012–13 Cherry Red Records Combined Counties Football League for sponsorship reasons) was the 35th in the history of the Combined Counties Football League, a football competition in England.

== Premier Division ==
Combined Counties Football League Premier Division
- Season: 2012–13
- Champions: Egham Town
- Promoted: Egham Town; Guernsey
- Relegated: Sandhurst Town; Dorking
- Matches: 462
- Goals: 1,694 (3.67 per match)

The Premier Division featured three new teams in a league of 22 teams after the promotion of Guildford City to the Southern Football League:

- Bedfont Sports, promoted as runners-up in the First Division.
- Guernsey, promoted as champions of the First Division.
- Hartley Wintney, promoted as third-placed club in the First Division.

For this season only, the FA were to promote a second club from two of the following six Step 5 leagues: Combined Counties League, Eastern Counties League, Essex Senior League, Kent League, Spartan South Midlands League and the Sussex County League. This was to fulfil the expansion of the Isthmian League Divisions One North and South from 22 to 24 clubs each. The two clubs were to be promoted on a points per game basis, and the two runners-up with the best PPG were VCD Athletic (Kent Football League) and Guernsey (Combined Counties League). Three others – Aylesbury United (Spartan South Midlands League), Redhill (Sussex County League) and Barkingside (Essex Senior League) – were also confirmed as promoted by the FA on 17 May, due to resignations and non-promotions elsewhere.

- From this league, only Badshot Lea, Egham Town, Epsom & Ewell, Guernsey, Hanworth Villa, Molesey, South Park and Wembley applied for promotion.

=== League table ===
Pos	Team	Pld	W	D	L	GF	GA	GD	Pts	Promotion or relegation
1	Egham Town	42	31	5	6	113	48	+65	98	Promoted to the Southern League Division One Central
2	Guernsey	42	30	6	6	131	56	+75	96	Promoted to the Isthmian League Division One South
3	Cove	42	23	9	10	90	62	+28	78	
4	South Park	42	23	8	11	96	60	+36	77	
5	Epsom & Ewell	42	23	6	13	85	72	+13	75	
6	Windsor	42	22	5	15	103	88	+15	71	
7	Badshot Lea	42	20	5	17	74	63	+11	65	
8	Farnham Town	42	19	4	19	64	71	−7	61	
9	Hanworth Villa	42	17	9	16	86	75	+11	60	
10	Molesey	42	17	9	16	70	63	+7	60	
11	Raynes Park Vale	42	18	4	20	75	83	−8	58	
12	Horley Town	42	16	9	17	59	67	−8	57	
13	Bedfont Sports	42	16	8	18	60	63	−3	56	
14	Croydon	42	15	5	22	70	103	−33	50	
15	Wembley	42	14	7	21	47	61	−14	49	
16	Camberley Town	42	13	10	19	56	72	−16	49	
17	Chessington & Hook United	42	13	10	19	63	92	−29	49	
18	Colliers Wood United	42	15	1	26	84	95	−11	46	
19	Hartley Wintney	42	13	4	25	71	107	−36	43	
20	Ash United	42	11	9	22	70	90	−20	42	
21	Sandhurst Town	42	13	2	27	68	103	−35	41	Relegated to Division One
22	Dorking	42	10	5	27	59	100	−41	35	Relegated to Division One

Source: FA Full-Time, League Official.
Rules for classification: 1) points; 2) goal difference; 3) number of goals scored.

=== Results ===
Home \ Away	ASH	BAD	BED	CAM	CHU	CWU	COV	CRD	DOR	EGH	E&E	FAR	GUE	HAN	HAR	HOR	MOL	RPV	SAN	SPK	WEM	WIN
Ash United		4–1	0–0	1–0	6–0	0–1	0–3	3–1	4–0	0–3	3–2	2–3	1–5	5–1	1–3	0–0	1–2	0–2	5–2	0–3	1–2	1–7
Badshot Lea	3–1		3–2	0–1	2–0	1–0	1–2	1–2	2–1	0–3	2–3	0–1	2–2	2–1	3–0	1–2	0–1	1–5	2–0	0–3	1–0	1–4
Bedfont Sports	1–1	0–3		3–2	3–1	4–1	2–1	3–2	0–0	0–2	1–2	2–1	1–2	2–2	2–1	0–3	1–2	1–0	3–2	2–1	1–0	0–3
Camberley Town	2–0	2–3	0–0		2–0	2–1	0–3	0–0	0–1	2–3	1–2	1–1	1–0	2–2	2–1	2–2	1–1	1–3	1–4	1–0	0–2	0–0
Chessington & Hook United	0–2	1–1	1–1	1–1		2–4	2–6	0–0	4–2	1–8	2–3	3–3	1–4	3–0	1–0	2–0	1–1	0–4	3–0	0–3	2–1	2–2
Colliers Wood United	1–3	0–2	1–2	0–1	4–0		1–2	5–2	2–4	0–0	3–4	1–5	4–2	4–2	3–4	2–0	2–1	3–4	3–1	1–2	1–2	2–3
Cove	3–2	2–4	0–1	2–1	2–2	3–2		5–2	3–0	1–1	1–1	3–2	0–3	2–1	4–1	2–0	1–1	1–0	3–1	1–1	0–2	3–2
Croydon	3–2	1–1	2–0	3–2	1–0	5–1	0–1		3–1	4–2	1–2	0–1	4–7	1–1	2–1	3–1	3–3	4–2	3–2	0–6	0–2	0–3
Dorking	2–2	0–2	0–4	5–1	6–3	2–0	3–4	5–3		0–0	0–1	3–2	0–6	0–6	0–2	2–3	3–2	0–0	0–1	2–4	0–0	1–2
Egham Town	4–0	3–2	1–0	4–3	4–1	4–1	3–1	3–0	3–1		3–0	4–0	3–1	2–1	1–6	3–0	7–1	2–0	2–1	0–2	1–0	3–1
Epsom & Ewell	5–2	0–1	0–4	2–1	0–1	3–2	1–6	2–6	3–2	2–0		3–1	2–5	2–1	2–4	4–1	1–0	6–1	4–0	1–1	2–0	1–3
Farnham Town	2–1	0–1	1–0	1–3	2–1	1–4	3–2	3–0	0–2	2–1	1–1		1–2	2–1	4–1	2–0	1–3	0–1	1–0	1–0	1–1	3–1
Guernsey	1–1	1–1	5–2	2–2	0–2	5–3	1–2	8–0	1–0	5–2	2–0	1–0		5–1	8–1	4–1	3–2	4–3	3–2	1–0	3–0	5–2
Hanworth Villa	2–2	3–3	3–0	2–3	2–1	1–4	2–0	1–3	4–0	0–2	3–2	1–3	2–1		2–2	3–1	1–2	0–0	1–0	2–2	2–0	6–1
Hartley Wintney	3–2	0–6	4–2	2–1	0–1	2–0	0–0	2–1	2–3	1–3	0–4	2–3	3–4	2–7		0–1	2–6	2–2	0–4	2–1	1–2	1–4
Horley Town	2–1	3–2	2–0	1–2	4–2	3–0	1–3	3–0	4–3	1–1	1–1	1–0	1–1	0–2	3–1		1–0	2–3	1–2	1–2	1–1	1–1
Molesey	2–2	1–0	2–1	2–2	0–2	0–2	0–3	5–1	2–0	0–3	0–0	2–0	1–1	1–2	0–1	1–1		3–2	3–0	2–1	0–2	0–1
Raynes Park Vale	0–0	3–2	2–0	1–2	2–5	2–4	3–1	2–1	3–1	1–2	2–3	3–0	1–5	2–1	2–1	1–0	1–6		0–1	0–4	0–1	2–3
Sandhurst Town	2–5	3–2	0–6	3–0	1–3	1–4	2–2	2–3	3–1	0–3	2–1	5–1	0–2	1–2	1–0	1–1	1–6	3–4		3–5	2–4	0–1
South Park	2–1	0–1	1–1	4–0	4–4	3–2	2–2	1–0	1–0	4–4	1–3	4–1	0–2	1–1	2–6	4–1	3–1	4–2	2–5		2–1	3–0
Wembley	2–2	0–2	1–1	0–3	0–0	1–3	2–1	2–0	3–1	0–2	1–4	2–3	0–2	1–2	2–2	1–2	2–1	1–3	1–2	1–2		1–0
Windsor	7–0	2–6	2–1	4–2	1–2	4–2	3–3	6–0	5–2	2–8	0–0	2–1	1–6	3–6	5–2	1–2	0–1	2–1	6–2	1–5	2–0	

Source: FA Full-Time
Legend: Blue = home team win; Yellow = draw; Red = away team win.

== Division One ==
Combined Counties Football League Division One
- Season: 2012–13
- Champions: Frimley Green
- Promoted: Frimley Green; Mole Valley SCR; Westfield
- Matches: 306
- Goals: 1,192 (3.9 per match)

Division One featured four new teams in a league of 18 teams:

- AFC Croydon Athletic, a new club formed after Croydon Athletic folded.
- Banstead Athletic, relegated from the Premier Division.
- Epsom Athletic, promoted as champions of the Surrey Elite Intermediate League.
- Mole Valley SCR, relegated from the Premier Division.
- Eversley F.C. changed their name to Eversley & California F.C. They were ineligible for promotion after failing to achieve the required ground grading from the league.

=== League table ===
Pos	Team	Pld	W	D	L	GF	GA	GD	Pts	Promotion or relegation
1	Frimley Green	34	26	2	6	99	41	+58	80	Promoted to the Premier Division
2	Mole Valley SCR	34	23	6	5	78	31	+47	75	Promoted to the Premier Division
3	Westfield	34	24	3	7	67	42	+25	75	Promoted to the Premier Division
4	Eversley & California	34	21	5	8	103	50	+53	68	
5	South Kilburn	34	20	7	7	69	43	+26	67	
6	Spelthorne Sports	34	20	6	8	83	54	+29	66	
7	Staines Lammas	34	18	7	9	79	63	+16	61	
8	AFC Croydon Athletic	34	17	3	14	71	63	+8	54	
9	Epsom Athletic	34	15	4	15	68	68	0	49	
10	Worcester Park	34	14	6	14	75	60	+15	48	
11	Cobham	34	13	3	18	59	69	−10	42	
12	Warlingham	34	10	4	20	69	98	−29	34	Resigned to the Surrey Elite Intermediate League
13	Knaphill	34	11	1	22	48	79	−31	34	
14	Feltham	34	9	6	19	59	76	−17	33	
15	Sheerwater	34	9	5	20	43	76	−33	32	
16	Farleigh Rovers	34	8	4	22	48	93	−45	28	
17	Banstead Athletic	34	5	10	19	40	68	−28	25	
18	CB Hounslow United	34	2	0	32	34	118	−84	6	

Source: FA Full-Time, League Official.
Rules for classification: 1) points; 2) goal difference; 3) number of goals scored.

=== Results ===
Home \ Away	ACA	BAN	CBH	COB	EPS	E&C	FAR	FEL	FRI	KNA	MVS	SHE	SKI	SPE	STA	WAR	WES	WOR
AFC Croydon Athletic		4–0	4–1	3–2	3–0	0–1	5–2	0–1	1–3	7–2	0–1	3–1	1–2	0–1	1–2	0–3	0–2	1–0
Banstead Athletic	2–3		6–1	1–2	0–3	1–1	1–3	1–1	0–4	1–1	0–1	2–2	0–2	3–3	2–2	5–3	0–1	2–1
CB Hounslow United	3–6	0–2		3–4	3–4	0–4	1–3	1–2	3–5	1–0	1–2	0–2	1–4	0–2	1–3	1–3	0–2	0–2
Cobham	2–1	3–0	1–0		3–4	0–4	4–0	2–1	1–2	0–1	1–1	2–1	2–4	3–3	1–2	6–1	1–3	0–7
Epsom Athletic	2–1	2–0	5–0	3–1		0–3	2–2	3–2	2–3	5–3	0–2	0–1	2–5	0–1	0–2	4–4	1–2	3–0
Eversley & California	6–1	2–1	6–0	3–2	7–3		6–1	2–2	0–3	3–0	0–6	1–2	3–1	6–3	4–3	7–1	2–0	0–1
Farleigh Rovers	3–4	1–1	2–0	1–2	1–2	0–6		3–1	2–1	2–1	4–5	4–2	0–1	0–1	0–2	1–4	0–3	1–1
Feltham	1–3	3–0	5–0	2–1	1–2	0–3	5–1		1–3	1–2	3–3	6–2	0–0	1–2	3–2	2–2	2–3	0–2
Frimley Green	6–2	1–0	7–0	0–1	3–0	1–0	5–0	4–0		3–0	3–2	2–1	2–1	1–3	1–2	4–0	2–1	1–3
Knaphill	2–3	2–1	4–1	0–2	0–4	2–3	3–0	2–1	0–5		1–2	4–0	2–4	1–3	0–1	3–1	0–2	4–2
Mole Valley SCR	4–0	3–0	3–0	3–0	2–2	1–0	3–0	5–0	1–1	1–0		3–0	0–1	3–1	4–3	1–2	0–1	1–2
Sheerwater	1–2	0–0	3–1	1–1	1–0	2–1	3–2	1–2	2–3	2–1	1–3		2–0	2–3	1–3	0–0	1–4	0–3
South Kilburn	1–1	1–1	2–1	2–0	0–1	2–2	1–3	3–2	1–3	5–0	1–1	5–1		3–2	0–2	2–1	1–0	2–2
Spelthorne Sports	1–1	4–3	4–1	2–1	2–1	3–4	3–1	3–1	2–2	5–0	1–3	3–1	2–3		2–2	6–1	1–1	4–0
Staines Lammas	2–3	4–0	5–4	3–2	3–3	2–2	6–0	2–2	3–2	4–2	0–4	0–0	0–4	2–1		2–3	3–5	2–2
Warlingham	0–1	1–1	2–4	1–3	3–1	1–7	3–2	7–3	2–4	1–2	0–1	3–2	1–2	1–4	1–2		1–2	3–7
Westfield	0–3	2–1	4–1	2–1	4–3	1–0	3–0	3–2	0–4	2–0	2–2	2–0	1–1	2–1	0–2	4–3		1–0
Worcester Park	3–3	1–2	5–0	4–2	0–1	4–4	1–1	3–0	2–4	1–3	0–1	7–2	1–2	0–1	3–1	2–6	3–2	

Source: FA Full-Time
Legend: Blue = home team win; Yellow = draw; Red = away team win.
