= 2018–19 Combined Counties Football League =

The 2018–19 Combined Counties Football League season (known as the 2018–19 Cherry Red Records Combined Counties Football League for sponsorship reasons) was the 41st in the history of the Combined Counties Football League, a football competition in England.

The constitution was announced on 25 May 2018.

== Premier Division ==
Combined Counties Football League Premier Division
- Season: 2018–19
- Champions: Chertsey Town
- Promoted: Chertsey Town
- Relegated: A.F.C. Hayes; Walton & Hersham
- Matches: 380
- Goals: 1,244 (3.27 per match)

The Premier Division was reduced from 22 to 20 clubs, and featured four new teams after the promotion of Westfield and Bedfont Sports to the Southern League, the transfer of North Greenford United to Spartan South Midlands League Division One, and the relegation of Godalming Town, Epsom & Ewell and Farnham Town to Division One:

- Badshot Lea, promoted as third-placed club in Division One.
- Cobham, promoted as runners-up in Division One.
- Raynes Park Vale, promoted as fifth-placed club in Division One.
- Southall, promoted and transferred from the Spartan South Midlands League.

=== League table ===
Pos	Team	Pld	W	D	L	GF	GA	GD	Pts	Promotion or relegation
1	Chertsey Town	38	28	7	3	97	41	+56	91	Promoted to the Isthmian League South Central Division
2	Sutton Common Rovers	38	23	9	6	85	48	+37	78	
3	Abbey Rangers	38	21	4	13	64	59	+5	67	
4	Southall	38	19	8	11	68	47	+21	64 (Note: Horley Town and Southall were each deducted one point for fielding ineligible players.)	
5	Raynes Park Vale	38	17	9	12	47	48	−1	60	
6	Spelthorne Sports	38	17	7	14	69	47	+22	58	
7	Banstead Athletic	38	14	13	11	58	48	+10	55	
8	Guildford City	38	17	4	17	62	67	−5	55	
9	Badshot Lea	38	14	8	16	52	69	−17	50	
10	Horley Town	38	14	8	16	58	67	−9	49	Transferred to the Southern Combination League
11	Knaphill	38	15	4	19	53	71	−18	49	
12	Redhill	38	13	8	17	62	66	−4	47	
13	Colliers Wood United	38	13	7	18	64	72	−8	46	
14	Cobham	38	12	9	17	62	66	−4	45	
15	Hanworth Villa	38	13	6	19	54	64	−10	45	
16	Camberley Town	38	13	8	17	63	65	−2	44 (Note: Camberley Town and CB Hounslow United were each deducted three points for fielding ineligible players.)	
17	CB Hounslow United	38	13	6	19	59	69	−10	42	
18	Balham	38	11	7	20	55	69	−14	40	
19	A.F.C. Hayes	38	11	7	20	51	68	−17	40	Relegated to Division One
20	Walton & Hersham	38	8	9	21	61	93	−32	33	Relegated to Division One

Source: FA Full-Time CCL Prem Div Table
Rules for classification: 1) points; 2) goal difference; 3) number of goals scored.

== Division One ==
Combined Counties Football League Division One
- Season: 2018–19
- Champions: Sheerwater
- Promoted: Sheerwater; Frimley Green
- Matches: 306
- Goals: 1,208 (3.95 per match)

Division One featured seven new teams after Worcester Park, Staines Lammas and Farleigh Rovers were demoted for ground grading reasons, South Park Reserves left the league, and Badshot Lea, Cobham and Raynes Park Vale were promoted to the Premier Division:

- British Airways, promoted from the Middlesex County League.
- Dorking Wanderers Reserves, joining from outside the pyramid structure (Suburban League).
- Epsom & Ewell, relegated from the Premier Division.
- Farnham Town, relegated from the Premier Division.
- Godalming Town, relegated from the Premier Division.
- Sandhurst Town, transferred from the Hellenic League.
- Tooting Bec, promoted from the Surrey Elite Intermediate League.
- Reserve sides were not eligible for promotion to Step 5.

=== League table ===
Pos	Team	Pld	W	D	L	GF	GA	GD	Pts	Promotion
1	Sheerwater	34	24	5	5	90	40	+50	77	Promoted to the Premier Division
2	Frimley Green	34	23	7	4	75	41	+34	76	Promoted to the Premier Division
3	Tooting Bec	34	21	7	6	85	39	+46	70	
4	Farnham Town	34	21	5	8	75	41	+34	68	
5	Bedfont & Feltham	34	18	8	8	100	55	+45	62	
6	Sandhurst Town	34	18	6	10	61	54	+7	60	
7	Ash United	34	17	7	10	82	66	+16	58	
8	Epsom & Ewell	34	17	4	13	77	67	+10	55	
9	Chessington & Hook United	34	14	6	14	69	67	+2	48	
10	Dorking Wanderers Reserves	34	12	6	16	63	77	−14	42	
11	British Airways	34	12	5	17	71	83	−12	41	
12	Godalming Town	34	11	5	18	49	78	−29	38	
13	Bagshot	34	10	5	19	39	93	−54	35	
14	FC Deportivo Galicia	34	10	3	21	60	72	−12	33	
15	Kensington Borough	34	7	10	17	45	74	−29	31	
16	Eversley & California	34	8	3	23	66	88	−22	27	
17	Fleet Spurs	34	7	5	22	55	86	−31	26	
18	Cove	34	5	5	24	46	87	−41	20	Reprieved from relegation after appeal
19	AC London	0	0	0	0	0	0	0	0	Expelled from the league (Note: AC London were expelled from the league in November 2018 and their playing record of P15 W9 D2 L4 GF36 GA25 Pts29 was expunged.)

Source: FA Full-Time CCL Div One Table
Rules for classification: 1) points; 2) goal difference; 3) number of goals scored.
