= 2017–18 Combined Counties Football League =

The 2017–18 Combined Counties Football League season (known as the 2017–18 Cherry Red Records Combined Counties Football League for sponsorship reasons) was the 40th in the history of the Combined Counties Football League, a football competition in England.

The constitution was announced on 26 May 2017.

== Premier Division ==
Combined Counties Football League Premier Division
- Season: 2017–18
- Champions: Westfield
- Promoted: Westfield; Bedfont Sports
- Relegated: Godalming Town; Epsom & Ewell; Farnham Town
- Matches: 462
- Goals: 1,605 (3.47 per match)

The Premier Division was reduced from 23 to 22 clubs, and featured four new teams after the promotion of Hartley Wintney to the Southern League, the transfer of Windsor to the Hellenic League, and the relegation of Badshot Lea, Bedfont & Feltham and Raynes Park Vale to the First Division:

- Balham, promoted as third-placed club in Division One.
- Banstead Athletic, promoted as champions of Division One.
- Godalming Town, relegated from Isthmian League.
- Redhill, promoted as runners-up in Division One.

With the suspension of ground grading Grade E for this season and the creation of a new league at Steps 3 and 4, the champions of all Step 5 leagues were compulsorily promoted to Step 4. Of the fourteen runners-up, the twelve clubs with the best PPG (points per game ratio) were also to be compulsorily promoted, but with resignations and mergers in leagues above, thirteen runners-up were promoted.

Teams at Step 5 without ground grading Grade F were to be relegated to Step 6, but no club in this division failed the ground grading process. All Step 5 leagues were fixed at 20 clubs for 2018–19, but in this case there were no further relegations or reprieves.

=== League table ===
Pos	Team	Pld	W	D	L	GF	GA	GD	Pts	Promotion or relegation
1	Westfield	42	34	4	4	145	43	+102	106	Promoted to the Isthmian League South Central Division
2	Bedfont Sports	42	29	6	7	104	58	+46	93	Promoted to the Isthmian League South Central Division
3	Sutton Common Rovers	42	27	6	9	92	48	+44	87	
4	Walton & Hersham	42	26	6	10	89	52	+37	84	
5	Balham	42	23	6	13	84	63	+21	75	
6	Redhill	42	20	5	17	84	66	+18	65	
7	Camberley Town	42	15	20	7	56	43	+13	65	
8	Knaphill	42	17	12	13	76	64	+12	63	
9	CB Hounslow United	42	18	6	18	77	66	+11	60	
10	Spelthorne Sports	42	17	8	17	68	65	+3	59	
11	Hanworth Villa	42	16	10	16	70	77	−7	58	
12	Guildford City	42	16	8	18	74	88	−14	56	
13	North Greenford United	42	15	10	17	75	76	−1	55	Transferred to the Spartan South Midlands League
14	Horley Town	42	15	8	19	58	87	−29	53	
15	Chertsey Town	42	14	7	21	66	83	−17	49	
16	Colliers Wood United	42	14	5	23	69	74	−5	47	
17	Abbey Rangers	42	12	11	19	58	69	−11	47	
18	A.F.C. Hayes	42	13	7	22	57	84	−27	46	
19	Banstead Athletic	42	11	9	22	54	94	−40	42	
20	Godalming Town	42	8	8	26	55	102	−47	32	Relegated to Division One
21	Epsom & Ewell	42	5	12	25	45	105	−60	27	Relegated to Division One
22	Farnham Town	42	5	10	27	49	98	−49	25	Relegated to Division One

Source: FA Full-Time CCL Prem Div Table
Rules for classification: 1) points; 2) goal difference; 3) number of goals scored.

== Division One ==
Combined Counties Football League Division One
- Season: 2017–18
- Champions: Worcester Park
- Promoted: Cobham; Badshot Lea; Raynes Park Vale
- Matches: 342
- Goals: 1,498 (4.38 per match)

Division One was increased from 18 to 19 clubs, and featured six new teams after Balham, Banstead Athletic and Redhill were promoted to the Premier Division, and Dorking and Epsom Athletic left the league:

- Badshot Lea, relegated from the Premier Division.
- Bedfont & Feltham, relegated from the Premier Division.
- FC Deportivo Galicia, promoted from the Middlesex County League.
- Fleet Spurs, transferred from the Wessex League
- Kensington Borough, transferred from the Spartan South Midlands League.
- Raynes Park Vale, relegated from the Premier Division.
- Reserve sides are not eligible for promotion to Step 5.

Step 6 clubs without ground grading Grade G were to be relegated to Step 7, and three clubs in this division failed the ground grading process. All Step 6 leagues were fixed at a maximum of 20 clubs for 2018–19, but in this case there were no further relegations or reprieves.

=== League table ===
Pos	Team	Pld	W	D	L	GF	GA	GD	Pts	Promotion or relegation
1	Worcester Park	36	29	4	3	142	50	+92	91	Demoted to the Surrey Elite Intermediate League
2	Cobham	36	24	7	5	108	44	+64	79	Promoted to the Premier Division
3	Badshot Lea	36	25	4	7	120	64	+56	79	Promoted to the Premier Division
4	Sheerwater	36	23	8	5	110	61	+49	77	
5	Raynes Park Vale	36	24	3	9	94	48	+46	75	Promoted to the Premier Division
6	Staines Lammas	36	22	5	9	88	57	+31	71	Demoted to the Surrey Elite Intermediate League
7	Frimley Green	36	19	7	10	92	54	+38	64	
8	AC London	36	19	1	16	75	58	+17	58	
9	Eversley & California	36	17	5	14	95	84	+11	53 (Note: Eversley & California were deducted three points for fielding an ineligible player in their 3-0 win over Farleigh Rovers on 16 December.)	
10	Ash United	36	16	5	15	64	78	−14	53	
11	Farleigh Rovers	36	14	6	16	72	87	−15	47 (Note: Farleigh Rovers were deducted one point for fielding an ineligible player in their 1-1 draw at FC Deportivo Galicia on 28 October.)	Demoted to the Surrey Elite Intermediate League
12	FC Deportivo Galicia	36	12	5	19	60	79	−19	41	
13	Chessington & Hook United	36	11	4	21	82	105	−23	37	
14	South Park Reserves	36	8	8	20	49	97	−48	32	Resigned at the end of the season
15	Kensington Borough	36	9	3	24	54	99	−45	30	
16	Fleet Spurs	36	7	5	24	59	104	−45	26	
17	Bedfont & Feltham	36	7	4	25	52	97	−45	25	
18	Cove	36	6	4	26	42	98	−56	22	
19	Bagshot	36	5	2	29	40	134	−94	17	

Source: FA Full-Time CCL Div One Table.
There were six unplayed matches: AC London v FC Deportivo Galicia (awarded to FC Deportivo Galicia as AC London could not raise a team) AC London v South Park Reserves (awarded to South Park Reserves as AC London were suspended) Farleigh Rovers v Bagshot (awarded to Farleigh Rovers as Bagshot could not raise a team) Kensington Borough v Ash United (awarded to Ash United as Kensington Borough could not raise a team) Staines Lammas v Chessington & Hook United (awarded to Staines Lammas as Chessington & Hook United could not raise a team) South Park Reserves v FC Deportivo Galicia (awarded to FC Deportivo Galicia as South Park Reserves were unable to provide a ground)
Rules for classification: 1) points; 2) goal difference; 3) number of goals scored.
