= 2015–16 Combined Counties Football League =

The 2015–16 Combined Counties Football League season (known as the 2015–16 Cherry Red Records Combined Counties Football League for sponsorship reasons) was the 38th in the history of the Combined Counties Football League, a football competition in England.

The league's constitution was announced on 29 May 2015.

== Premier Division ==
Combined Counties Football League Premier Division
- Season: 2015–16
- Champions: Hartley Wintney
- Promoted: Ashford Town
- Relegated: Redhill; Chessington & Hook United; Cove
- Matches: 462
- Goals: 1,698 (3.68 per match)

The Premier Division was increased from 21 to 22 clubs, and featured three new teams after the promotion of Molesey to the Isthmian League, and the relegation of Frimley Green to Division One:

- A.F.C. Hayes, relegated from the Southern League Division One Central.
- Chessington & Hook United, promoted as third-placed club in Division One.
- Redhill, relegated from the Isthmian League Division One South.
- Mole Valley SCR F.C. changed their name to Sutton Common Rovers F.C.

Five clubs applied for promotion to Step 4: Ashford Town, Camberley Town, Epsom & Ewell, Hartley Wintney and Horley Town. Hartley Wintney failed the ground grading requirements.

=== League table ===
Pos	Team	Pld	W	D	L	GF	GA	GD	Pts	Promotion or relegation
1	Hartley Wintney	42	34	4	4	126	39	+87	106	
2	Ashford Town	42	31	3	8	112	51	+61	96	Promoted to the Southern League Division One Central
3	Camberley Town	42	29	7	6	96	39	+57	94	
4	Epsom & Ewell	42	26	8	8	104	46	+58	86	
5	Knaphill	42	25	4	13	109	61	+48	79	
6	Horley Town	42	21	9	12	92	62	+30	72	
7	Hanworth Villa	42	21	4	17	76	71	+5	67	
8	Colliers Wood United	42	17	8	17	78	80	−2	59	
9	Westfield	42	16	11	15	63	68	−5	59	
10	Farnham Town	42	16	9	17	78	70	+8	57	
11	Spelthorne Sports	42	15	10	17	76	83	−7	55	
12	Windsor	42	15	10	17	71	79	−8	55	
13	Bedfont Sports	42	15	9	18	70	60	+10	54	
14	Guildford City	42	16	6	20	77	95	−18	54	
15	Raynes Park Vale	42	17	3	22	72	96	−24	54	
16	A.F.C. Hayes	42	14	7	21	63	86	−23	49	
17	Badshot Lea	42	15	3	24	62	104	−42	48	
18	Chertsey Town	42	13	7	22	58	81	−23	46	
19	Sutton Common Rovers	42	13	6	23	66	85	−19	45	
20	Redhill	42	11	6	25	64	87	−23	39	Relegated to Division One
21	Chessington & Hook United	42	8	6	28	54	113	−59	30	Relegated to Division One
22	Cove	42	3	2	37	31	142	−111	11	Relegated to Division One

Source: FA Full-Time, fchd.
Rules for classification: 1) points; 2) goal difference; 3) number of goals scored.

== Division One ==
Combined Counties Football League Division One
- Season: 2015–16
- Champions: CB Hounslow United
- Promoted: CB Hounslow United; Bedfont & Feltham; Abbey Rangers
- Matches: 272
- Goals: 1,045 (3.84 per match)

Division One was increased from 16 to 17 clubs, and featured four new teams after AFC Croydon Athletic were promoted and transferred to the Southern Counties East League, Chessington & Hook United were promoted to the Premier Division, and Alton Town transferred to the Wessex League:

- Abbey Rangers, promoted from the Surrey Elite Intermediate League.
- Dorking Wanderers Reserves, joining from outside the pyramid structure (Suburban League).
- Frimley Green, relegated from the Premier Division.
- South Park Reserves, joining from outside the pyramid structure (Suburban League).
- Reserve sides are not eligible for promotion to Step 5.
- In March 2016, Dorking Wanderers Reserves announced their resignation from the league effective at the end of the season. This was due to Dorking Wanderers and Dorking groundsharing at Dorking Wanderers during the 2016–17 season.

=== League table ===
Pos	Team	Pld	W	D	L	GF	GA	GD	Pts	Promotion
1	CB Hounslow United	32	24	5	3	73	25	+48	77	Promoted to the Premier Division
2	Bedfont & Feltham	32	24	2	6	95	41	+54	74	Promoted to the Premier Division
3	Abbey Rangers	32	23	3	6	72	32	+40	72	Promoted to the Premier Division
4	Worcester Park	32	18	5	9	79	40	+39	59	
5	Eversley & California	32	18	5	9	85	53	+32	59	
6	Banstead Athletic	32	17	6	9	74	47	+27	57	
7	Cobham	32	15	3	14	60	63	−3	48	
8	Dorking	32	15	1	16	64	61	+3	46	
9	Staines Lammas	32	14	3	15	61	54	+7	45	
10	Ash United	32	11	9	12	57	59	−2	42	
11	Sandhurst Town	32	9	8	15	57	89	−32	35	Transferred to the Hellenic League
12	Frimley Green	32	10	4	18	48	64	−16	34	
13	Sheerwater	32	10	3	19	55	70	−15	33	
14	South Park Reserves	32	8	6	18	53	85	−32	30	
15	Dorking Wanderers Reserves	32	5	8	19	32	66	−34	23	Resigned at the end of the season
16	Farleigh Rovers	32	7	2	23	43	100	−57	23	
17	Epsom Athletic	32	5	5	22	37	96	−59	20	

Source: fchd.
Rules for classification: 1) points; 2) goal difference; 3) number of goals scored.
