= 2014–15 Combined Counties Football League =

The 2014–15 Combined Counties Football League season (known as the 2014–15 Cherry Red Records Combined Counties Football League for sponsorship reasons) was the 37th in the history of the Combined Counties Football League, a football competition in England.

== Premier Division ==
Combined Counties Football League Premier Division
- Season: 2014–15
- Champions: Molesey
- Promoted: Molesey
- Relegated: Frimley Green
- Matches: 420
- Goals: 1,519 (3.62 per match)

The Premier Division featured five new teams after the promotion of South Park to the Isthmian League, the transfer of Croydon to the Southern Counties East League, the transfer of Wembley to the Spartan South Midlands League, and the relegation of Ash United, Alton Town and Chessington & Hook United to Division One:

- Ashford Town, relegated from Southern League Division One Central.
- Chertsey Town, relegated from Southern League Division One Central.
- Guildford City, relegated from Southern League Division One South & West.
- Knaphill, promoted as third-placed club in Division One.
- Spelthorne Sports, promoted as champions of Division One.
- Eversley & California were initially promoted as runners-up of Division One, but were demoted back there in July 2014 when it emerged that there was a restriction on the use of their floodlights, so the club effectively failed the ground grading requirements. There was no subsequent promotion for fourth-placed Staines Lammas, and no reprieve for relegated Ash United.

The following six clubs applied for promotion to Step 4: Ashford Town, Camberley Town, Epsom & Ewell, Molesey, Spelthorne Sports and Windsor.

=== League table ===
Pos	Team	Pld	W	D	L	GF	GA	GD	Pts	Promotion or relegation
1	Molesey	40	30	1	9	108	36	+72	91	Promoted to the Isthmian League Division One South
2	Camberley Town	40	26	8	6	86	33	+53	86	
3	Ashford Town	40	25	5	10	94	54	+40	80	
4	Cove	40	23	8	9	89	65	+24	77	
5	Windsor	40	23	4	13	96	57	+39	73	
6	Spelthorne Sports	40	20	6	14	73	60	+13	66	
7	Epsom & Ewell	40	19	4	17	77	68	+9	61	
8	Badshot Lea	40	18	6	16	75	58	+17	60	
9	Hartley Wintney	40	16	5	19	56	77	−21	53	
10	Farnham Town	40	15	7	18	77	99	−22	52	
11	Colliers Wood United	40	15	6	19	75	71	+4	51	
12	Knaphill	40	14	6	20	58	81	−23	48	
13	Westfield	40	12	11	17	61	68	−7	47	
14	Raynes Park Vale	40	13	8	19	50	65	−15	47	
15	Bedfont Sports	40	14	5	21	52	74	−22	47	
16	Horley Town	40	12	10	18	70	89	−19	46	
17	Guildford City	40	14	4	22	76	100	−24	46	
18	Mole Valley SCR	40	13	6	21	62	94	−32	45	
19	Hanworth Villa	40	12	8	20	58	73	−15	44 (Note: Hanworth Villa and Chertsey Town were reprieved from relegation.)	
20	Chertsey Town	40	12	7	21	66	94	−28	43	
21	Frimley Green	40	9	5	26	60	103	−43	32	Relegated to Division One

Source: FA Full-Time, fchd.
Rules for classification: 1) points; 2) goal difference; 3) number of goals scored.

=== Results ===
Home \ Away	ASH	BAD	BED	CAM	CHE	CWU	COV	E&E	FAR	FRI	GLD	HAN	HAR	HOR	KNA	MVS	MOL	RPV	SPE	WES	WIN
Ashford Town		3–2	4–1	1–0	3–1	4–1	1–2	1–3	3–1	3–1	3–0	2–0	5–1	3–3	2–2	3–1	0–1	2–1	3–1	1–2	2–3
Badshot Lea	3–0		1–1	0–4	4–1	1–1	0–2	4–2	2–1	0–1	4–1	0–1	2–2	2–0	5–0	3–4	1–0	3–0	0–0	3–0	1–2
Bedfont Sports	0–2	1–0		1–2	1–1	1–2	0–1	0–2	3–1	3–1	3–6	0–4	1–2	0–4	1–3	6–0	1–2	2–1	1–3	1–0	0–3
Camberley Town	1–1	2–0	3–1		4–2	2–1	1–2	1–0	2–0	4–0	5–2	1–0	3–1	1–1	3–1	1–0	1–2	3–0	0–0	0–0	2–2
Chertsey Town	0–4	3–2	1–2	0–0		2–2	2–3	1–2	4–1	3–3	3–1	4–2	0–1	0–0	0–2	2–4	0–9	2–1	0–3	3–0	0–1
Colliers Wood United	0–3	2–3	6–1	0–1	6–2		1–2	3–2	4–2	4–1	1–2	1–3	3–4	4–3	2–1	2–1	1–2	1–1	2–1	2–0	2–1
Cove	3–4	1–3	2–0	1–2	5–2	1–1		1–0	2–6	3–0	3–1	2–1	2–1	2–1	3–1	3–1	2–1	2–2	4–3	1–1	2–0
Epsom & Ewell	2–4	3–0	0–1	2–4	1–2	2–1	2–2		2–4	0–0	4–1	1–1	2–1	2–2	1–2	1–0	1–3	0–1	4–3	3–1	0–5
Farnham Town	1–0	0–7	1–1	1–1	3–3	1–7	2–6	0–2		4–4	0–1	2–1	1–4	1–2	4–1	0–0	4–3	0–1	2–1	4–2	6–3
Frimley Green	1–3	2–1	1–1	0–3	3–2	1–3	1–3	1–5	1–3		1–2	2–3	1–2	4–5	1–1	2–3	2–4	1–2	1–3	3–1	2–0
Guildford City	2–3	3–2	2–3	1–4	0–3	3–0	4–2	1–3	4–0	2–3		2–1	2–3	3–3	2–1	2–2	1–5	0–1	3–4	2–3	2–2
Hanworth Villa	3–0	0–2	1–1	0–2	2–0	2–1	3–0	2–5	2–3	0–2	3–1		4–1	4–3	2–2	1–3	1–4	2–2	0–0	1–1	1–6
Hartley Wintney	0–3	0–3	2–3	0–2	2–3	1–0	0–4	2–1	1–2	3–1	0–5	3–0		3–2	1–0	0–1	2–2	1–2	2–3	1–3	0–4
Horley Town	0–4	1–0	0–1	1–8	0–2	0–2	2–2	1–0	2–4	2–2	7–1	2–1	0–1		2–1	2–2	1–5	3–1	1–0	1–1	1–2
Knaphill	0–4	0–3	3–0	0–6	1–1	3–1	1–2	1–4	2–2	1–2	4–2	3–1	2–1	3–1		2–1	0–8	1–0	3–0	2–4	2–4
Mole Valley SCR	3–5	3–3	2–1	1–4	0–4	1–0	2–2	2–5	1–0	1–3	0–2	3–2	1–2	2–5	0–4		2–1	4–1	0–2	4–0	0–4
Molesey	1–0	0–1	0–1	3–0	4–1	2–1	3–2	5–0	5–0	– (Note: Home win was awarded.)	2–3	0–1	1–2	3–0	1–0	3–2		3–0	3–0	3–0	3–1
Raynes Park Vale	3–1	1–2	1–0	2–1	2–1	3–0	2–1	0–2	1–1	4–0	0–1	1–1	1–1	2–3	0–0	2–3	0–2		3–1	2–4	0–5
Spelthorne Sports	1–1	3–0	2–1	0–0	4–2	2–2	3–2	0–3	1–5	4–0	6–1	3–1	0–1	4–0	2–0	1–0	1–4	2–1		1–3	2–1
Westfield	0–2	4–1	1–3	2–0	1–3	1–1	2–2	4–0	5–0	7–3	2–2	0–0	0–0	0–2	1–2	2–2	0–2	1–1	0–2		1–2
Windsor	3–4	3–0	0–0	1–2	5–1	2–1	2–2	0–3	2–4	2–1	2–0	2–0	5–1	5–1	2–1	6–0	0–3	2–1	0–1	1–2	

Legend: Blue = home team win; Yellow = draw; Red = away team win.

== Division One ==
Combined Counties Football League Division One
- Season: 2014–15
- Champions: Farleigh Rovers
- Promoted: AFC Croydon Athletic; Chessington & Hook United
- Matches: 240
- Goals: 949 (3.95 per match)

Division One remained at 16 clubs, and featured three new teams after Spelthorne Sports and Knaphill were promoted to the Premier Division, and South Kilburn left the league:

- Ash United, relegated from the Premier Division.
- Alton Town, relegated from the Premier Division.
- Chessington & Hook United, relegated from the Premier Division.

=== League table ===
Pos	Team	Pld	W	D	L	GF	GA	GD	Pts	Promotion
1	Farleigh Rovers	30	21	4	5	62	35	+27	67	
2	AFC Croydon Athletic	30	21	1	8	81	29	+52	64	Promoted to the Southern Counties East League Premier Division
3	Chessington & Hook United	30	19	4	7	89	50	+39	61	Promoted to the Premier Division
4	Worcester Park	30	17	8	5	75	34	+41	59	
5	Bedfont & Feltham	30	17	5	8	62	50	+12	56	
6	Banstead Athletic	30	16	6	8	74	43	+31	54	
7	CB Hounslow United	30	13	5	12	60	57	+3	44	
8	Staines Lammas	30	12	7	11	57	43	+14	43	
9	Eversley & California	30	13	3	14	65	59	+6	42	
10	Ash United	30	9	8	13	44	75	−31	35	
11	Cobham	30	10	3	17	53	49	+4	33	
12	Dorking	30	9	5	16	51	67	−16	32	
13	Alton Town	30	8	3	19	49	76	−27	27	Transferred to the Wessex League
14	Sheerwater	30	7	3	20	38	91	−53	24	
15	Epsom Athletic	30	6	4	20	43	95	−52	22	
16	Sandhurst Town	30	7	1	22	46	96	−50	19 (Note: Sandhurst Town were deducted three points for fielding an ineligible player against Eversley & California on 23 August.)	

Source: fchd.
Rules for classification: 1) points; 2) goal difference; 3) number of goals scored.

=== Results ===
Home \ Away	ACA	ALT	ASH	BAN	BDF	CBH	CHU	COB	DOR	EPS	E&C	FAR	SAN	SHE	STA	WOR
AFC Croydon Athletic		3–1	1–2	1–0	1–3	3–0	0–2	3–0	3–1	10–0	1–0	3–0	5–0	0–1	1–0	3–3
Alton Town	0–3		7–0	0–2	1–4	1–4	1–3	2–0	2–1	0–3	1–2	4–0	2–5	2–1	1–4	2–2
Ash United	0–3	2–1		1–4	1–1	2–1	2–8	1–2	1–2	1–0	1–0	0–1	2–0	1–1	1–1	1–1
Banstead Athletic	0–1	5–1	7–1		3–4	1–3	0–1	1–0	3–0	1–2	0–2	0–3	5–0	3–1	1–1	3–3
Bedfont & Feltham	0–9	3–1	1–1	2–2		3–1	3–3	1–0	1–0	3–3	0–1	1–2	4–3	1–0	1–1	0–1
CB Hounslow United	1–0	4–2	2–2	0–0	2–0		1–1	1–6	4–1	3–0	2–1	0–1	2–1	7–0	3–2	0–1
Chessington & Hook United	2–3	5–3	10–1	2–2	4–2	3–2		1–0	3–2	0–2	2–5	2–3	4–0	4–3	1–4	1–0
Cobham	0–1	1–4	3–1	0–1	0–2	3–3	1–2		1–2	7–0	4–0	0–1	6–2	2–2	2–1	0–3
Dorking	0–4	1–2	5–2	1–1	1–2	2–1	1–2	3–0		4–5	1–4	1–1	2–0	3–2	1–4	3–4
Epsom Athletic	0–3	4–4	2–3	1–3	0–2	0–1	0–5	1–3	1–3		1–4	1–5	2–3	3–1	1–2	0–5
Eversley & California	3–7	2–2	2–1	4–6	2–0	2–0	0–3	1–3	2–2	4–1		1–1	2–3	6–2	1–3	1–3
Farleigh Rovers	2–1	3–0	1–1	1–2	3–2	3–2	2–1	4–1	4–1	2–2	2–0		4–1	2–1	1–0	0–1
Sandhurst Town	1–4	2–1	1–4	3–5	1–3	2–4	1–3	0–6	3–1	1–6	1–3	2–3		4–3	1–0	1–3
Sheerwater	1–2	1–0	0–6	0–7	1–2	4–2	0–8	2–1	1–2	2–2	2–10	2–1	2–1		0–2	1–2
Staines Lammas	3–1	0–1	1–2	2–3	0–3	6–3	5–2	1–1	2–2	4–1	2–0	1–3	1–1	0–1		2–2
Worcester Park	3–1	6–0	0–0	2–3	2–3	4–0	1–1	2–0	2–2	6–0	2–0	1–3	4–1	5–0	1–2	

Legend: Blue = home team win; Yellow = draw; Red = away team win.
