= 2019–20 Combined Counties Football League =

The 2019–20 Combined Counties Football League season (known as the 2019–20 Cherry Red Records Combined Counties Football League for sponsorship reasons) was the 42nd in the history of the Combined Counties Football League, a football competition in England. The season was abandoned on 26 March 2020, due to the COVID-19 pandemic.

The constitution was announced on 19 May 2019.

This season, the Premier Division champions were to be promoted to Step 4. The runners-up in this division and ten other Step 5 divisions in other leagues were to be ranked according to PPG (points per game), and the top four in that ranking would also have been promoted. The remaining seven runners-up would have competed in "winner takes all" play-offs with seven clubs finishing bottom in Step 4 leagues, the winners being placed at Step 4 and the losers at Step 5 for 2020–21.

The bottom clubs in all 14 Step 5 divisions were to be ranked according to PPG, and the 12 lowest-ranked clubs were to be relegated to Step 6.

In Division One, the top four clubs were to be promoted to Step 5, with the bottom two liable to relegation to Step 7.

== League suspension and season abandonment ==
Despite other leagues suspending all matches from 13 March due to the COVID-19 pandemic, the Combined Counties League continued to hold matches on 14 March, although two clubs refused to travel. The following day, the league postponed all matches until 28 March. On 16 March, the FA decided to postpone all matches across all FA Competitions until 3 April, and a league statement confirmed the postponement of all matches for the foreseeable future.

On 26 March 2020, the league season was formally abandoned, with all results being expunged, and no promotion or relegation taking place to, from, or between the two divisions. On 30 March 2020, sixty-six non-league clubs sent an open letter to the Football Association requesting that they reconsider their decision.

Jersey Bulls had already amassed sufficient points to be promoted from Division One, but were not promoted after the abandonment.

== Premier Division ==
Combined Counties Football League Premier Division
- Season: 2019–20
- Champions: none
- Promoted: none
- Relegated: none
- Matches: 302
- Goals: 988 (3.27 per match)

The Premier Division was increased from 20 to 21 clubs, and featured five new teams after the promotion of Chertsey Town to the Isthmian League, the transfer of Horley Town to the Southern Combination League, and the relegation of A.F.C. Hayes and Walton & Hersham to Division One:

- Ascot United, transferred from the Hellenic League.
- Egham Town, relegated from the Isthmian League.
- Frimley Green, promoted as runners-up in Division One.
- Molesey, also relegated from the Isthmian League South Central Division.
- Sheerwater, promoted as champions of Division One.
- Frimley Green were initially not promoted from Division One, but appealed the decision and were successful, so the division ran with 21 clubs.

=== League table at the time of abandonment ===
Pos	Team	Pld	W	D	L	GF	GA	GD	Pts	Promotion or relegation
1	Ascot United	32	22	2	8	63	37	+26	68	
2	Spelthorne Sports	31	18	5	8	63	40	+23	59	
3	Knaphill	29	17	7	5	63	28	+35	58	
4	Frimley Green	32	15	7	10	58	53	+5	52	
5	Southall	28	14	8	6	52	31	+21	50	
6	Molesey	31	17	2	12	48	38	+10	50 (Note: Molesey had three points deducted for fielding an ineligible player)	
7	Abbey Rangers	30	14	7	9	50	34	+16	49	
8	Sutton Common Rovers	25	13	4	8	68	45	+23	43	
9	Cobham	30	13	4	13	37	36	+1	43	
10	Egham Town	31	12	4	15	55	60	−5	40	
11	Colliers Wood United	26	11	5	10	40	40	0	38	
12	Badshot Lea	27	11	3	13	50	46	+4	36	
13	Balham	27	11	3	13	58	56	+2	36	Transferred to the Southern Counties East League
14	Redhill	26	12	0	14	44	49	−5	36	
15	Camberley Town	28	11	3	14	32	53	−21	36	
16	Sheerwater	30	10	5	15	53	67	−14	35	
17	Guildford City	31	8	4	19	28	52	−24	28	
18	Hanworth Villa	29	7	6	16	36	54	−18	27	
19	Raynes Park Vale	24	7	5	12	32	40	−8	26	
20	Banstead Athletic	24	7	4	13	27	47	−20	24 (Note: Banstead Athletic had one point deducted for fielding an ineligible player)	
21	CB Hounslow United	33	5	6	22	31	82	−51	21	

Source: FA Full-Time CCL Prem Div Table
Rules for classification: 1) points; 2) goal difference; 3) number of goals scored.

=== Results table ===
Home \ Away	SPE	ASC	MOL	CWU	KNA	SOU	FRI	SCR	BAL	COB	EGH	ABB	BAD	CAM	RED	GLD	BAN	SHE	RPV	HAN	CBH
Spelthorne Sports	—	1–2	0–0	0–1	2–1	0–3	4–1		3–2	2–0	2–2				3–1			5–2	0–0	1–2	4–0
Ascot United		—	1–2		2–3					2–0	3–1	2–1	1–0	2–3		0–3	1–0	4–1		1–3	3–2
Molesey	6–0		—	0–5	0–1	2–0	3–1	1–3	4–0	1–0	1–3	1–0		1–0	2–1		3–0	0–2	2–1	0–2	5–0
Colliers Wood United		2–3		—		1–2	2–3			1–0	2–1					4–1		3–2	2–2	2–2	2–2
Knaphill	2–0	0–2	3–1	0–0	—	0–2					3–1	0–0	4–1	3–0		4–0	0–0	3–3	4–2	2–2	0–0
Southall		1–0		1–3		—	2–2			1–1	4–4		1–1		1–2	1–0	0–1	5–1	3–1	1–1	1–0
Frimley Green	1–3	1–1	4–2		3–2	2–1	—	2–0	4–2		2–1	1–1	3–1	0–2	5–1	0–0		3–0	1–2		1–3
Sutton Common Rovers	2–3		3–1		0–4	5–5		—		2–0		0–3	1–4		1–2	0–1	4–0	3–0	2–0		12–1
Balham	1–4	1–2	1–2	1–2		1–1	3–2	2–3	—	0–0	4–3	2–3		4–1			4–1	2–2		3–1	1–0
Cobham	0–2	0–2		2–0	2–1		2–2		3–2	—		1–2	2–1	1–2	2–0	0–1			0–0	1–3	
Egham Town		0–3		3–0	0–3		1–2	4–1	1–6	0–1	—	3–0	1–0	2–3		2–2	3–3	4–2			1–0
Abbey Rangers	1–0		2–1		2–2	1–2			1–0	1–0		—	2–3	0–0	2–0	0–0	1–2			3–3	
Badshot Lea		1–3	0–2	0–1			5–0		0–3	1–3	4–1		—	5–0	1–4	3–2	1–3	4–1	3–2		
Camberley Town	1–2			0–2		0–0	1–0	0–4	1–2		1–4	0–4		—	0–1		3–2		1–3		3–1
Redhill	3–4	1–2	3–0	1–3	0–2	0–5				0–3	0–2			2–1	—					4–0	3–0
Guildford City	1–2	0–1	1–2	0–0	0–4	0–1			0–1		0–2		0–3	1–2	1–4	—		2–1	2–0	2–1	3–0
Banstead Athletic	1–1	0–4		1–0	0–3	0–3	1–2					0–5				0–1	—		2–0		1–1
Sheerwater		4–2	0–2				1–2		3–5	1–2		1–1	3–1	1–2	1–0	2–1	3–2	—	1–5	2–0	1–0
Raynes Park Vale	0–2	0–4	1–0	3–0		0–3	1–1	1–1			3–0	1–4							—		4–1
Hanworth Villa	0–3	1–1	0–1		1–3	0–2	0–0	2–3		2–3	0–2		0–2	1–2			0–1	0–3		—	
CB Hounslow United	0–3		0–0	5–1				0–5		1–3	0–2	1–3	0–2	1–1	1–4	3–1	2–5	2–2	1–0		—

Updated to match(es) played on unknown. Source: http://combinedcounties.pitchero.com/match-info/grids?division_id=51945
Legend: Blue = home team win; Yellow = draw; Red = away team win.

== Division One ==
Combined Counties Football League Division One
- Season: 2019–20
- Champions: none
- Promoted: none
- Relegated: none
- Matches: 264
- Goals: 1,050 (3.98 per match)

Division One was increased from 19 to 20 clubs, and featured four new teams after Sheerwater and Frimley Green were promoted to the Premier Division and AC London were expelled:

- A.F.C. Hayes, relegated from the Premier Division.
- Jersey Bulls, a new club from Jersey.
- Walton & Hersham, relegated from the Premier Division.
- Westside, promoted from the Surrey Elite Intermediate League.
- Reserve sides were not eligible for promotion to Step 5.
- Cove were initially relegated at the end of last season, but were reprieved on appeal.
- Kensington Borough changed their name to Kensington & Ealing Borough.

=== League table at the time of abandonment ===
Pos	Team	Pld	W	D	L	GF	GA	GD	Pts
1	Jersey Bulls	27	27	0	0	99	7	+92	81
2	Farnham Town	28	19	4	5	48	26	+22	61
3	Walton & Hersham	28	16	3	9	79	54	+25	51
4	Tooting Bec	29	14	7	8	64	42	+22	49
5	Fleet Spurs	29	15	2	12	56	41	+15	47
6	Bedfont & Feltham	26	13	5	8	58	39	+19	44
7	Sandhurst Town	25	12	8	5	56	39	+17	44
8	Kensington & Ealing Borough	24	13	1	10	51	49	+2	40
9	Epsom & Ewell	26	11	5	10	51	50	+1	38
10	Bagshot	28	9	6	13	45	55	−10	33
11	A.F.C. Hayes	22	9	4	9	51	50	+1	31
12	Cove	26	9	4	13	42	72	−30	31
13	Dorking Wanderers Reserves	27	8	6	13	57	68	−11	30
14	FC Deportivo Galicia	30	8	6	16	50	90	−40	30
15	Westside	22	8	4	10	49	38	+11	28
16	Ash United	26	9	0	17	41	68	−27	27
17	British Airways	29	7	5	17	42	77	−35	26
18	Eversley & California	26	4	8	14	31	53	−22	20
19	Chessington & Hook United	23	4	8	11	38	57	−19	17 (Note: Chessington & Hook United had three points deducted.)
20	Godalming Town	27	3	6	18	42	75	−33	15

Source: FA Full-Time CCL Div One Table
Rules for classification: 1) points; 2) goal difference; 3) number of goals scored.

=== Results table ===
Home \ Away	JER	FAR	SAN	TOO	K&E	WES	DOW	W&H	BRI	CHU	HAY	BDF	E&E	COV	DGA	FLE	ASH	BAG	E&C	GOD
Jersey Bulls	—		4–1		4–0			1–0		6–0		3–0		7–0		4–0	3–0	7–1	5–1	2–0
Farnham Town	0–2	—	1–4		3–1	3–1			1–1							2–0		2–1		
Sandhurst Town			—	1–1				3–2	4–0	1–0		2–5		1–2		4–1	2–1	2–2	3–1	2–1
Tooting Bec	0–1	1–2		—	3–1				3–3			1–2		4–1		2–1	3–0			2–1
Kensington & Ealing Borough	1–5		2–3		—				2–3								2–1	3–1	3–0	
Westside	0–1				2–1	—	4–2	3–4	2–2				1–3		6–0					
Dorking Wanderers Reserves				0–4	4–5	1–5	—	3–6	1–4	5–1				1–1		0–1		1–0		
Walton & Hersham	0–3	0–1	2–2	1–1	0–5			—	7–3		2–1	3–4		8–2			5–1		3–0	
British Airways	0–4	2–3		0–2		0–3		0–6	—	3–3		1–1		0–2				1–5		4–2
Chessington & Hook United		0–2	2–2	4–3	1–2	1–1		3–4		—		3–0		0–2				3–3	1–1	
A.F.C. Hayes	1–2					4–2					—				0–0	1–5	7–3	3–3		3–1
Bedfont & Feltham	0–3	0–1	0–0	2–2	2–3	3–0	3–4	2–0			5–2	—		4–0				3–0		1–1
Epsom & Ewell		0–2	1–1	2–2	2–0	3–2			3–0		1–4	0–5	—	4–0		3–5	2–1			5–2
Cove		0–7	2–0	2–1		3–3	0–6				3–3		2–2	—		2–1		1–2		3–1
FC Deportivo Galicia	0–6		4–4		2–3	0–7	2–2	0–3	2–0	6–2				4–3	—	4–1	1–0	2–4		3–3
Fleet Spurs		1–3	0–0	2–4	1–2	2–1		4–0	2–0	1–2		1–2				—				4–2
Ash United		1–2	0–8		2–1	2–1	1–4	1–4		3–1		4–1	1–2	4–2		2–1	—		2–1	
Bagshot		1–0		2–1	2–0	3–1			2–3	1–1	1–4		2–1		3–0	0–1	1–2	—		3–3
Eversley & California		1–1		0–2	2–2	0–2			2–3	2–2		0–5			2–1	0–2		4–0	—	2–2
Godalming Town	0–5	1–2	1–2	1–5				2–2	2–1	2–4				3–4	3–0	0–5	4–2			—

Updated to match(es) played on unknown. Source: http://combinedcounties.pitchero.com/match-info/grids?division_id=51946
Legend: Blue = home team win; Yellow = draw; Red = away team win.
