= 2013–14 Combined Counties Football League =

The 2013–14 Combined Counties Football League season (known as the 2013–14 Cherry Red Records Combined Counties Football League for sponsorship reasons) was the 36th in the history of the Combined Counties Football League, a football competition in England.

== Premier Division ==
Combined Counties Football League Premier Division
- Season: 2013–14
- Champions: South Park
- Promoted: South Park
- Relegated: Ash United; Alton Town; Chessington & Hook United
- Matches: 462
- Goals: 1,616 (3.5 per match)

The Premier Division featured four new teams after the promotion of Egham Town and Guernsey to Step 4:

- Alton Town, transferred from the Wessex League.
- Frimley Green, promoted as champions of Division One.
- Mole Valley SCR, promoted as third-placed club in Division One.
- Westfield, promoted as runners-up in Division One.
- The clubs to have applied for promotion to Step 4 were: Camberley Town, Epsom & Ewell, Hanworth Villa, Molesey, South Park, Wembley and Windsor.

=== League table ===
Pos	Team	Pld	W	D	L	GF	GA	GD	Pts	Promotion or relegation
1	South Park	42	34	2	6	121	41	+80	104	Promoted to the Isthmian League Division One South
2	Camberley Town	42	27	9	6	88	42	+46	90	
3	Epsom & Ewell	42	24	6	12	87	61	+26	78	
4	Westfield	42	24	5	13	72	51	+21	77	
5	Cove	42	24	4	14	95	67	+28	76	
6	Windsor	42	21	7	14	98	68	+30	70	
7	Hartley Wintney	42	20	5	17	94	77	+17	65	
8	Hanworth Villa	42	18	10	14	82	64	+18	64	
9	Wembley	42	18	9	15	64	60	+4	63	Transferred to the Spartan South Midlands League
10	Raynes Park Vale	42	18	8	16	79	81	−2	62	
11	Molesey	42	15	12	15	70	53	+17	57	
12	Frimley Green	42	17	6	19	63	82	−19	57	
13	Farnham Town	42	15	9	18	60	70	−10	54 (Note: Farnham Town v Croydon was awarded as a home win on 5 May 2014.)	
14	Croydon	42	16	5	21	58	81	−23	53	Transferred to the Southern Counties East League
15	Badshot Lea	42	14	10	18	58	84	−26	52	
16	Colliers Wood United	42	14	7	21	69	80	−11	49	
17	Bedfont Sports	42	11	12	19	52	79	−27	45	
18	Mole Valley SCR	42	11	9	22	69	101	−32	42	
19	Horley Town	42	12	6	24	60	93	−33	42	
20	Ash United	42	12	5	25	62	78	−16	41	Relegated to Division One
21	Alton Town	42	9	7	26	57	93	−36	34	Relegated to Division One
22	Chessington & Hook United	42	9	5	28	58	110	−52	32	Relegated to Division One

Source: FA Full-Time, fchd.
Rules for classification: 1) points; 2) goal difference; 3) number of goals scored.

== Division One ==
Combined Counties Football League Division One
- Season: 2013–14
- Champions: Spelthorne Sports
- Promoted: Spelthorne Sports; Knaphill
- Matches: 240
- Goals: 934 (3.89 per match)

Division One featured two new teams after the resignation of Warlingham:

- Dorking, relegated from the Premier Division.
- Sandhurst Town, relegated from the Premier Division.
- Broadfields United (Middlesex County League) and Old Farnboronians (Surrey Elite Intermediate League) applied to join the league but were turned down. Fleet Spurs applied to transfer from the Wessex League, but were also turned down.
- In 2012, Feltham merged with defunct ex-CCL club Bedfont, forming Bedfont & Feltham. The name change took effect at the end of the 2012–13 season.
- Eversley & California were initially promoted as runners-up, but were demoted back to Division One in July 2014 when it emerged that there was a restriction on the use of their floodlights, so the club effectively failed the ground grading requirements. There was no subsequent promotion for fourth-placed Staines Lammas, and no reprieve for relegated Ash United.

=== League table ===
Pos	Team	Pld	W	D	L	GF	GA	GD	Pts	Promotion
1	Spelthorne Sports	30	22	8	0	92	23	+69	74 (Note: CB Hounslow United v Dorking (5 April), South Kilburn v Dorking (12 April) and South Kilburn v Farleigh Rovers (3 May) were awarded as home wins. Dorking v South Kilburn (26 April) and Cobham v Spelthorne Sports (29 April) were awarded as away wins.)	Promoted to the Premier Division
2	Eversley & California	30	19	4	7	78	40	+38	61	
3	Knaphill	30	19	4	7	89	52	+37	61	Promoted to the Premier Division
4	Staines Lammas	30	17	6	7	76	44	+32	57	
5	Bedfont & Feltham	30	17	4	9	68	48	+20	55	
6	Epsom Athletic	30	17	3	10	85	68	+17	54	
7	AFC Croydon Athletic	30	16	5	9	64	43	+21	53	
8	Farleigh Rovers	30	13	6	11	52	46	+6	45	
9	Worcester Park	30	12	7	11	64	52	+12	43	
10	South Kilburn	30	10	4	16	36	57	−21	31 (Note: South Kilburn were deducted three points for fielding an ineligible player against Epsom Athletic on 3 August.)	Resigned to the Middlesex County League
11	Sheerwater	30	8	7	15	35	60	−25	31	
12	Banstead Athletic	30	9	6	15	54	74	−20	30 (Note: Banstead Athletic were deducted three points for fielding an ineligible player against CB Hounslow United on 7 December.)	
13	Sandhurst Town	30	8	3	19	49	92	−43	27	
14	CB Hounslow United	30	6	5	19	33	66	−33	23	
15	Dorking	30	4	3	23	28	79	−51	15	
16	Cobham	30	4	3	23	31	90	−59	15	

Source: fchd.
Rules for classification: 1) points; 2) goal difference; 3) number of goals scored.
