= SPFC =

SPFC may refer to:

- São Paulo Futebol Clube, a Brazilian football club
- Sri Pahang F.C., a Malaysian football club
- Semen Padang F.C., an Indonesian football club
- Shanghai Port F.C., a Chinese football club
- South Park F.C. an English football club
