= Crawley and District Football League =

English football league

The Crawley and District Football League was a football competition in England which was founded with a single division in 1956–57. It expanded to three divisions in 1957–58; most of the teams came from the expansion of the industrial estate. In the 1980s the league had eight divisions, with the league taking in teams from leagues in Surrey.

With the demise of the large factories teams folded, new pubs teams entered and gradually the league went down to three divisions. The then-committee decided to fold the league. During its heyday many clubs moved up into the Sussex County League (SCL) when a better pyramid system was adopted. Dorking Wanderers have been the most successful club to be in the league make their way to the National League one step from the Football League. After the 2005–06 season, South Park made the jump into the CCL. The Crawley & District League Premier Division sat at step 7 (or level 11) of the National League System. 2008–09 Champions Bletchingley transferred to the Surrey Elite Intermediate League in 2009–10. In 2009–10 Merstham Newton went the entire league season unbeaten to become Premier Division Champions for the second time in five years.

At the end of the 2009–10 season, the league disbanded and its member clubs joined the Mid-Sussex League or the West Sussex League.

== Recent champions ==
Season	Premier Division	Division One	Division Two	Division Three
2003–04	Southpark & Regate Town	Trident	Crawley College	Stones
2004–05	Merstham Newton	Boca Elite	Horley Albion II	Maidenbower Village
2005–06	Merstham Newton	Windmill	County Oak	Sussex Elite
2006–07	GSK Phoenix	Northgate Athletic	Crawley Elite	Real Hydraquip Reserves
2007–08	Holland Sports	Real Hydraquip	Ifield Edwards 'B'	

The League was reduced to three divisions from 2008–09.

Season	Premier Division	Division One	Division Two
2008–09	Bletchingley	Furnace Green Galaxy	Chagos Island
2009–10	Merstham Newton	Sporting Crawley	Ifield Edwards 'B'
