= Bedfont F.C. =

Association football club in England

Coordinates: 51.4611°N 0.4262°W

Bedfont
- Full name: Bedfont Football Club
- Nickname: The Yellows
- Founded: May 2012
- Ground: The Orchard, Bedfont
- Capacity: 1,200
- Chairman: Jim Williams
- Manager: James Key and Charlie Lawrence
- League: Combined Counties League Premier Division North
- 2025–26: Combined Counties League Division One, 2nd of 23 (promoted via play-offs)
- Website: http://www.bedfontfc.com
Home colours	Away colours

Bedfont Football Club is a semi-professional football club in Bedfont, Greater London, England. Affiliated to the Middlesex County Football Association, they are currently members of the Combined Counties League Premier Division North and play at the Orchard.

== History ==
The club was established in May 2012 as a merger of Bedfont Football & Social Club and Feltham, taking Feltham's place in Division One of the Combined Counties League. The Bedfont Football & Social Club, meanwhile, contained people involved with Bedfont F.C., who were dissolved in 2010. However, as Feltham had already entered the 2012–13 FA Vase under their name, the club played as Feltham F.C. until being renamed Bedfont & Feltham at the start of the 2013–14 season. That season saw them win the Middlesex Premier Cup, beating Staines Lammas 1–0 in the final.

In 2014–15 the club won the Division One Challenge Cup, beating Worcester Park 4–3 on penalties in the final. The following season saw then finish as runners-up in Division One, earning promotion to the Premier Division. However they were relegated back to Division One at the end of the 2016–17 season. At the end of the 2021–22 season the club was renamed Bedfont Football Club, with a reformed Feltham Football Club being admitted to the Middlesex County League. In 2025–26 they were runners-up in Division One, qualifying for the promotion play-offs. After beating Wembley 1–0 in the semi-finals, the club defeated Brook House 2–1 in the final to earn promotion to the Premier Division North. The season also saw them win the Middlesex Premier Cup for a second time, defeating Spartans Youth 2–1 in the final.

=== Season-by-season record ===
Season	Division	Position	Notes
2013–14	Combined Counties League Division One	13/18	
2013–14	Combined Counties League Division One	5/16	
2014–15	Combined Counties League Division One	5/16	
2015–16	Combined Counties League Division One	2/17	Promoted
2016–17	Combined Counties League Premier Division	22/23	Relegated
2017–18	Combined Counties League Division One	17/19	
2018–19	Combined Counties League Division One	5/18	
2019–20	Combined Counties League Division One	–	Season abandoned
2020–21	Combined Counties League Division One	–	Season abandoned
2021–22	Combined Counties League Division One	11/21	

== Ground ==
Bedfont play their home games at the Orchard on Hatton Road in Feltham. It has a capacity of 1,200.

== Managers ==
- May 2012 – August 2014: Wayne Tisson
- August 2014 – November 2014: Dean Thomas
- November 2014 – January 2016: Louis Carder-Walcott
- February 2016 – September 2016: John Cook
- September 2016 – October 2016: Joe Monks
- December 2016 – April 2017: Aaron Morgan
- April 2017 – October 2017: Garry Haylock
- October 2017 – May 2018: Dan Huxley
- May 2018 – April 2021: Adam Bessent
- May 2021 – March 2022: Daniel Ranger
- May 2022 – March 2023: Anthony Bersey
- March 2023 – October 2023: Gareth Price
- October 2023 – January 2024: Martin Fahey
- February 2024 – February 2025: Nehemiah Adams
- February 2025 – present: James Key and Charlie Lawrence

== Honours ==
- Combined Counties League
  - Division One Cup winners 2014–15
- Middlesex Premier Cup
  - Winners 2013–14, 2025–26

== Records ==
- Best FA Cup performance: First qualifying round, 2014–15, 2015–16
- Best FA Vase performance: Second round, 2019–20

== See also ==
- Bedfont F.C. players
- Bedfont F.C. managers
