= Balham F.C. =

Association football club in England

Balham
- Full name: Balham Football Club
- Founded: 2011
- Ground: Imperial Fields, Mitcham
- Capacity: 3,500
- Chairman: Jennie Molyneux
- Manager: Daré Jean-Pierre
- League: Combined Counties League Premier Division South
- 2024–25: Combined Counties League Premier Division South, 18th of 20
- Website: balhamfc.com
Home colours	Away colours

Balham Football Club is a football club based in Balham, in the London Borough of Wandsworth, England. They are currently members of the Combined Counties League Premier Division South and play at Imperial Fields in Mitcham.

== History ==
Balham Football Club was established in 2011 by Greg Cruttwell as an adult team for the Balham Blazers youth football club. They joined Junior Division One of the Surrey South Eastern Combination, and after finishing fourth in their first season, were promoted to Intermediate Division Two. In 2012–13 they finished third in Intermediate Division Two, earning promotion to Intermediate Division One, which they won the following season.

The club subsequently moved up to the Surrey Elite Intermediate League for the 2014–15 season, finishing third in their first season. Although this was a high-enough position for promotion to the Combined Counties League, the club's ground was not deemed up to standard for promotion. The following season the club moved to Cobham's Leg O'Mutton field in order to meet the ground grading criteria, and after finishing as runners-up, were promoted to Division One of the Combined Counties League.

In 2016–17 Balham finished third in Division One of the Combined Counties League, earning promotion to the Premier Division, as well as we winning the London Senior Trophy with a 3–2 win over Glebe in the final. The following season saw them win the London Senior Cup, defeating Cray Valley PM 4–1 in the final. At the end of the 2019–20 season the club were transferred to the Premier Division of the Southern Counties East League due to their new groundshare with AFC Croydon Athletic at The Mayfield Stadium. However, after the following season they were transferred back to the Premier Division South of the Combined Counties League.

At the end of the 2021–22 season Cruttwell stood down as chairman and manager, becoming club president. The club relocated again in 2024, this time moving to Tooting & Mitcham United's Imperial Fields ground until summer 2025.

== Honours ==
- Surrey South Eastern Combination
  - Intermediate Division One champions 2013–14
- London Senior Cup
  - Winners 2017–18
- London Senior Trophy
  - Winners 2016–17

== Records ==
- Best FA Cup performance: Second qualifying round, 2019–20
- Best FA Vase performance: Second round, 2025–26

== See also ==
- Balham F.C. players
