= Abbey Rangers F.C. =

Association football club in England

Coordinates: 51.3826°N 0.4916°W

Abbey Rangers
- Full name: Abbey Rangers Football Club
- Nickname: The Abbey
- Founded: 1976
- Ground: Addlestone Moor, Addlestone
- Chairman: Nick Riley
- Manager: Adam Bessent
- League: Combined Counties League Premier Division South
- 2025–26: Combined Counties League Premier Division South, 7th of 20
Home colours	Away colours

Abbey Rangers Football Club is a football club based in Addlestone, England. The club are currently members of the Combined Counties League Premier Division South and play at Addlestone Moor.

== History ==
The club were established in 1976, initially as a youth club for boys aged 7–16, and were named after the nearby Chertsey Abbey. Having played in both Chertsey and Addlestone, they became members of the Surrey & Hants Border League, winning Division One in 2004–05. After finishing as runners-up the following season, they left the league, joining Division One of the Guildford & Woking Alliance. They were Division One champions at the first attempt, earning promotion to the Premier Division. The club were Premier Division runners-up the following season, and were promoted to Division One of the Surrey County Intermediate League (Western). They went on to win the division and the League Cup in their first season in the league, resulting in promotion to the Premier Division.

After finishing second in the Premier Division in 2010–11, the club joined the Surrey Elite Intermediate League. They remained in the league until 2014–15 when a fourth-placed finish resulted in promotion to Division One of the Combined Counties League. In their first season in Division One, they finished third, earning promotion to the Premier Division. The 2016–17 season saw the club enter the FA Cup for the first time in their history when they entered the competition in the preliminary qualification round. As a result of league reorganisation, they were placed in the Premier Division North in 2021, before being transferred to the Premier Division South in 2022.

== Ground ==
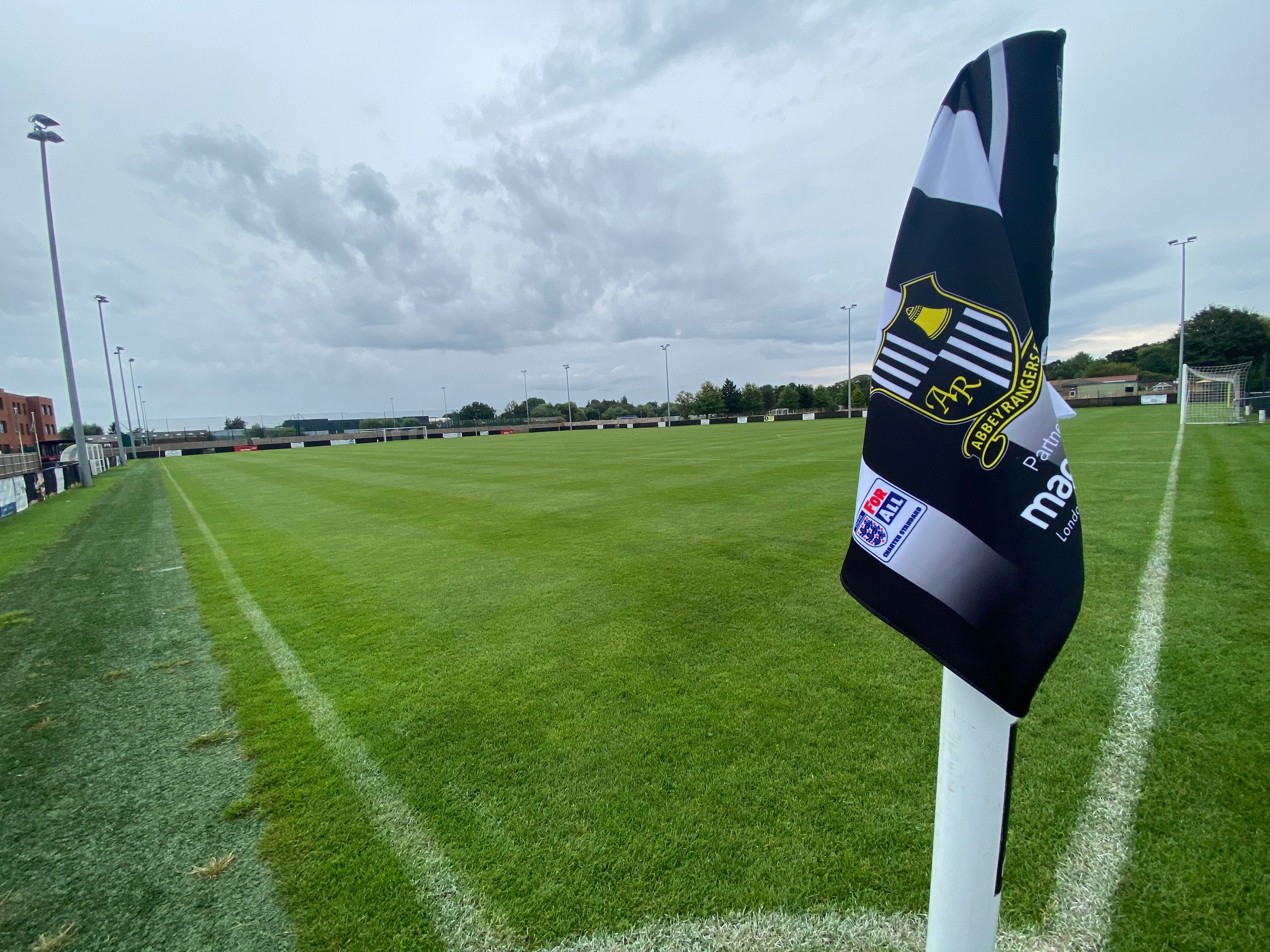
Addlestone Moor

The club play at Addlestone Moor.

== Honours ==
- Surrey County Intermediate League (Western)
  - Division One champions 2008–09
  - League Cup winners 2008–09
- Guildford & Woking Alliance
  - Division One champions 2006–07
- Surrey & Hants Border League
  - Division One champions 2004–05

== Records ==
- Best FA Cup performance: Third qualifying round, 2019–20
- Best FA Vase performance: Fifth round, 2018–19
