= Surrey Premier County Football League =

Eleventh tier of English league football

- Founded: 2008
- Country: England
- Divisions: 2
- Number of clubs: 16
- Level on pyramid: Level 11
- Feeder to: Combined Counties Football League
- Promotion to: Combined Counties Football League Division One
- Relegation to: Surrey County Intermediate League (Western) Premier Division; Surrey South Eastern Combination Division One
- Domestic cup: Premier Challenge (League) Cup
- Current champions: Worcester Park (2025-26)
- Most championships: Wimbledon Casuals (3 times)
- Website: https://www.surreypremierfl.co.uk

The Surrey Premier County Football League is a regional English football league for teams in south-west London, Surrey and neighbouring areas. It was founded in 2008. The league is at the 11th level of the English football league system and was incorporated into the National League System as a Step 7 league by the Football Association in June 2012.

The league was formed to bridge the gap between local intermediate leagues and the lower division of the Combined Counties League. The league is fed by the Surrey County Intermediate League (Western) and the Surrey South Eastern Combination. Teams from other local leagues, such as the Aldershot & District League, may also apply for membership.

In 2020, leagues/divisions designated as step 7 were re-categorised as "Regional Feeder Leagues" to the National League System (steps 1-6). The League is once again part of the English Football League System.

In the 2025-26 season, Worcester Park won the league while Wimbledon Casuals won the SPCFL Premier Challenge Cup, beating Worcester Park 8-7 on penalties after a 2-2 draw at full-time.

In July 2026 the League published their first website (https://www.surreypremierfl.co.uk/) which was created to be a central hub for league information, news, fixtures and results.

== History ==
Formed in 2008 as the Surrey Elite Intermediate Football League, there was an Intermediate Division and a Reserve Division. In summer 2021, the league rebranded, adopting a new name - the Surrey Premier County Football League - and a new, colourful logo, renaming its top division as the SPCFL Premier Division. The Reserve Division lasting until the end of the 2021-22 season, was reduced to just six clubs on the eve of the 2022-23 season, and so opted to not operate. The league actively sought to return this division for the 2025-26 season after a three-year hiatus but fell just short of viable numbers. However, it has been confirmed that in 2026-27 the league will again operate with two divisions, with the expansion of the Premier Division to 16 teams and the Reserve Division will operate with 9 teams, many being development sides to the first teams operating in the Premier Division.

== 2025-26 member clubs ==
=== SPCFL Premier Division (14 teams) ===
- Addlestone (8th)
- AFC Cubo (11th)
- AFC Royal Holloway (13th + reprieved)
- Bagshot (14th + reprieved)
- CB Hounslow & Abbots (6th)
- Cranleigh (10th)
- Dial Square (5th + promoted)
- FC Battersea Ironsides (3rd)
- Keens Park Rangers (4th)
- Laleham (12th)
- Richmond & Kew (9th)
- Selhurst (resigned before league campaign)
- Tooting & Mitcham United U23s (7th)
- Wimbledon Casuals (2nd)
- Worcester Park (1st)

== 2026–27 member clubs ==
=== SPCFL Premier Division (16 teams) ===
- Addlestone
- AFC Cubo
- AFC Royal Holloway
- Bagshot
- CB Hounslow & Abbots
- Chessington & Hook United
- Cranleigh
- FC Battersea Ironsides
- Keens Park Rangers
- Laleham
- London Hibernian
- Parkside
- Richmond & Kew
- Tongham
- Tooting & Mitcham United U23s
- Worcester Park

=== SPCFL Reserve Division (10 teams) ===
- Addlestone U23
- AFC Walcountians Reserves
- CB Hounslow & Abbots Junior Reserves
- Eversley & California Reserves
- London Samurai Rovers Reserves
- Parkside Reserves
- Richmond & Kew Reserves
- University Of Surrey (Guildford City U23)
- Walton & Hersham B
- Worcester Park Reserves

== Sponsors ==
The league has had title sponsorship from MJM Sports between mid-November 2023 until the end of season 2024/25, and from Surrey Solar for the Premier Challenge Cup, with effect from 6 March 2026 on a two-season deal.

== List of champions ==
=== Premier Division and Premier Challenge Cup ===
Season	League Champions	Runners-Up	Promoted Club	Challenge Cup Winners
2008–09	Eversley	Liphook United	Eversley	Eversley
2009–10	Epsom Eagles	Battersea Ironsides	-	Wandgas Sports
2010–11	Spelthorne Sports	Epsom Athletic	Spelthorne Sports	Spelthorne Sports
2011–12	Epsom Athletic	Horsley	Epsom Athletic	Coulsdon Town
2012–13	Yateley Green	Old Farnboronians	-	Old Farnboronians
2013–14	NPL	Battersea Ironsides	-	Abbey Rangers
2014–15	Horsley	Battersea Ironsides	Abbey Rangers (4th)	Horsley
2015–16	Horsley	Balham	Balham	Horsley
2016–17	Virginia Water	Tooting Bec	Virginia Water	Virginia Water
2017–18	Tooting Bec	Royal Holloway Old Boys	Tooting Bec	Chessington KC
2018–19	AFC Cubo	Battersea Ironsides	Westside (4th)	NPL
2019–20	-	-	-	-
2020–21	Worcester Park	AFC Cubo	-	Worcester Park
2021–22	Worcester Park	Staines Lammas	Spartans Youth (5th)	-
2022–23	Wimbledon Casuals	AFC Cubo	-	-
2023–24	Wimbledon Casuals	Worcester Park	Staines & Lammas (Middx) (3rd)	Worcester Park
2024–25	Wimbledon Casuals	AFC Cubo	AFC Walcountians (3rd)	AFC Royal Holloway
2025-26	Worcester Park	Wimbledon Casuals	Dial Square (5th)	Wimbledon Casuals

=== Reserve Division and Reserve Challenge Cup ===
Season	League Champions	Runners-Up	Challenge Cup Winners
2008–09	Elm Grove Reserves	Battersea Ironsides Reserves	Eversley Reserves
2009–10	Spelthorne Sports Reserves	Elm Grove Reserves	Battersea Ironsides Reserves
2010–11	Hersham Elm Grove Reserves	Coulsdon United Reserves	Battersea Ironsides Reserves
2011–12	Horsley Reserves	Ripley Village Reserves	Epsom Athletic Reserves
2012–13	Abbey Rangers Reserves	Battersea Ironsides Reserves	Abbey Rangers Reserves
2013–14	Epsom & Ewell Reserves	Farleigh Rovers Reserves	Virginia Water Reserves
2014–15	Farleigh Rovers Reserves	Battersea Ironsides Reserves	Farleigh Rovers Reserves
2015–16	Sheerwater Reserves	Virginia Water Reserves	Abbey Rangers Reserves
2016–17	Abbey Rangers Reserves	Battersea Ironsides Reserves	Battersea Ironsides Reserves
2017–18	Tooting Bec Reserves	Battersea Ironsides Reserves	Sutton Common Rovers Reserves
2018–19	Battersea Ironsides Reserves	Sutton Common Rovers Reserves	Sutton Common Rovers Reserves
2019–20	-	-	-
2020–21	Cobham U23	Frimley Green U23	Cobham U23
2021–22	Staines Lammas Reserves	Cobham U23 Development	-

== Notes and references ==
Notes
