= Badshot Lea F.C. =

Association football club in England

Coordinates: 51.197193°N 0.82343549°W

Badshot Lea
- Full name: Badshot Lea Football Club
- Nickname: The Baggies
- Founded: 1904
- Ground: Westfield Lane, Wrecclesham
- Capacity: 1,200
- Chairman: Mark Broad
- Manager: Adam New
- League: Combined Counties League Premier Division South
- 2025–26: Combined Counties League Premier Division South, 10th of 20
Home colours	Away colours

Badshot Lea Football Club is a football club based in Wrecclesham, Surrey, England. The club are currently members of the Combined Counties League Premier Division South and play at Westfield Lane.

== History ==
The club was established in 1904, although they only played friendly matches until affiliating with the Surrey County Football Association in 1907. They subsequently played in local leagues before joining the Surrey Intermediate League, winning Division One in 1936–37 and again in 1937–38. They won the division again in 1985–86, earning promotion to the Surrey Premier League. However, they were relegated back to the Surrey Intermediate League the following season after finishing second bottom of the division.

Badshot Lea won the league's Challenge Cup in 1987–88 and the Invitation Cup in 1989–90. They were relegated to Division Two, but won the division in 1992–93. They won the Challenge Cup for a second time in 2000–01. In 2003 they moved up to Division One East of the Hellenic League. They won the Supplementary Cup in 2005–06, and after finishing third in 2006–07 they were promoted to the Premier Division. However, after one season in the Hellenic League's top division, they were transferred to the Premier Division of the Combined Counties League, swapping leagues with AFC Wallingford. Their first season in the Combined Counties League also saw them enter the FA Vase for the first time.

The following season saw Badshot Lea make their debut in the FA Cup, eventually losing 10–0 to Ashford Town (Middlesex) in the second qualifying round. In 2010–11 they won the Aldershot & District Senior Cup, beating Fleet Town on penalties in the final after a 3–3 draw. After finishing in the bottom three of the Premier Division in 2016–17 the club were relegated to Division One. However, they finished third in Division One the following season and were promoted back to the Premier Division. When the Premier Division was split in two in 2021, the club were placed in the Premier Division South. They were runners-up in the division in 2022–23, earning promotion to the South Central Division of the Isthmian League as one of the highest ranked runners-up across the step five divisions. The season also saw them win the Aldershot Senior Cup, beating Westfield F.C. 2–0 in the final.

== Ground ==
The club played at the Badshot Lea Recreation Ground until 2007, when they were forced to leave due to it failing ground grading regulations. They then spent several years groundsharing, playing home matches at Cherrywood Road in Farnborough, Godalming Town's Weycourt and Ash United's Shawfield Stadium. The club moved to Camberley Town's Krooner Park for the 2017–18 season, during which the club started redeveloping Westfield Lane in Wrecclesham, the former home ground of Farnham Rugby Club, which had relocated to Monkton Lane. Ahead of the 2019–20 season, Badshot Lea moved into Westfield Lane, playing the inaugural match at the ground against neighbours Aldershot Town in a friendly on 6 July.

== Honours ==
- Hellenic League
  - Supplementary Cup winners 2005–06
- Surrey Intermediate League
  - Division One champions 1936–37, 1937–38, 1985–86
  - Division Two champions 1992–93
  - Challenge Cup winners 1987–88, 2000–01
  - Invitation Cup winners 1989–90
- Surrey Junior Cup
  - Winners 1937–38
- Aldershot & District Senior Cup
  - Winners 2010–11, 2022–23
- Kenny Warner Memorial Shield
  - Winners 2003–04, 2004–05
- Runwick Charity Cup
  - Winners 1937–38, 1986–87, 1988–89

== Records ==
- Best FA Cup performance: Third qualifying round, 2012–13
- Best FA Vase performance: Third round, 2009–10
- Record attendance: 908 vs Aldershot Town, friendly match, 4 July 2026

== See also ==
- Badshot Lea F.C. players
- Badshot Lea F.C. managers
