= Epsom Athletic F.C. =

Coordinates: 51°21′01.06″N 0°18′35.42″W

Epsom Athletic
- Full name: Epsom Athletic Football Club
- Nickname: The Blue Stallions
- Founded: 1997
- Dissolved: 2017
- Ground: Chalky Lane, Chessington
Home colours	Away colours

Epsom Athletic Football Club was a football club based in Chessington, England. They were affiliated to the Surrey County Football Association.

== History ==
The club was established in 1997 by Paul Burstow and joined the Sutton & District League. In 1999–2000 they were Division Two runners-up and were promoted to Division One. The following season saw them finish second in Division One, earning a second straight promotion. The club then won the Premier Division at the first attempt. After switching to the Surrey South Eastern Combination, they finished as runners-up in Division Two in 2003–04 season and were promoted to Division One. In 2005–06 they won the League Cup, and the following season saw them end the season as Division One runners-up.

In 2008 Epsom were founder members of the Surrey Elite Intermediate League. They finished as league runners-up in 2010–11 but were refused promotion to the Combined Counties League. However, after winning the league the following season, and agreeing a groundshare with Chessington & Hook United, the club were promoted to Division One of the Combined Counties League. In their first season in the Combined Counties League the club made their debut in the FA Vase, losing 4–3 at home to Camberley Town. The following season saw them make their FA Cup debut, losing 3–1 at home to Croydon. After finishing bottom of Division One in 2016–17, the club were relegated back to Division One of the Surrey South Eastern Combination. They subsequently folded during the 2017–18 season

== Honours ==
- Surrey Elite Intermediate League
  - Champions 2011–12
- Surrey South Eastern Combination
  - League Cup winners: 2005–06
- Sutton & District League
  - Premier Division champions 2001–02

== Records ==
- Best FA Cup performance: Extra preliminary round, 2013–14, 2014–15
- Best FA Vase performance: First round, 2013–14
