= Knaphill F.C. =

Association football club in England

Coordinates: 51°18′37″N 0°36′53″W

Knaphill Football Club
- Full name: Knaphill Football Club
- Nickname: The Knappers
- Founded: 1924
- Ground: Redding Way, Knaphill
- Chairman: James Carpenter
- Manager: Mike Woolgar
- League: Combined Counties League Premier Division South
- 2025–26: Combined Counties League Premier Division South, 6th of 20
Home colours	Away colours

Knaphill Football Club is a football club based in Knaphill, Surrey, England. They are currently members of the Combined Counties League Premier Division South and play at the Brookwood Country Park on Redding Way.

== History ==
The club was established in 1924. They became members of the Surrey Intermediate League, winning the league title in 1935–36. However, by the 1970s the club were playing in the Woking & District League. They won the league's Charity Cup in 1972–73 and went on to win the Premier Division, League Cup and Charity Cup treble in 1978–79. The club were Premier Division runners-up the following season, but retained the League Cup and Charity Cup, as well as winning the Challenge Cup.

Knaphill then returned to the Surrey County Intermediate League (Western), joining Division Three. They were Division Three champions their first season back in the league, earning promotion to Premier Division Two. In 1981–82 the club were runners-up in Premier Division Two, securing a third successive promotion. The following season saw them finish as runners-up in Premier Division One. In the 1990s the club absorbed Heathlands from the Guildford and Woking Alliance League.

In 2005–06 Knaphill won Division One of the Surrey County Intermediate League (Western) and were promoted to the Premier Division. The following season they were Premier Division champions, earning promotion to Division One of the Combined Counties League. A third-place finish in Division One in 2013–14 saw the club promoted to the Premier Division. In 2017–18 they won the Premier Challenge Cup, beating Worcester Park 3–2 in the final. In 2023–24 the club finished third in the Combined Counties League Premier Division South, qualifying for the promotion play-offs. After beating Tadley Calleva 2–0 the semi-finals, they lost 2–1 to AFC Croydon Athletic in the final.

== Ground ==
The club initially played at Waterer's Park, a site which had been given to Woking Urban District Council by Anthony Waterer in 1924. They played there until moving to the Brookwood Country Park on Redding Way during the 2004–05 season, although reserve teams continued to play at Waterer's Park. Floodlights were erected in 2011 together with a 50-seat stand. Another 50-seat stand was added in March 2015 alongside a covered terrace with a capacity of 50.

== Management team ==
Position	Staff
Managers	Mike Woolgar
Assistant Manager	Daryl Cooper-Smith
Coaches	Ricky Mallett
Coaches	Glen Nichols
Physiotherapist	Becca Cross

Source: Knaphill F.C.

== Honours ==
- Combined Counties League
  - Premier Challenge Cup winners 2017–18
- Surrey County Intermediate League (Western)
  - Champions 1935–36, 2007–08
  - Division One champions 2006–07
  - Division Three champions 1980–81
- Woking & District League
  - Premier Division champions 1978–79
  - League Cup winners 1978–79, 1979–80
  - Challenge Cup winners 1979–80
  - Charity Cup winners 1972–73, 1978–79, 1979–80

== Records ==
- Best FA Cup performance: Second qualifying round, 2017–18, 2023–24
- Best FA Vase performance: Fourth round, 2015–16
- Record attendance: 872 vs AFC Croydon Athletic, Combined Counties League Premier Division South play-off final, 7 May 2024
- Biggest win: 15–1 vs Hale
