= Chessington & Hook United F.C. =

Association football club in England

Coordinates: 51°21′01″N 0°18′35″W

Chessington & Hook United
- Full name: Chessington & Hook United; Football Club
- Nicknames: The Blues, Chessy
- Founded: 1921
- Ground: Chalky Lane, Chessington
- Capacity: 3,000 (167 seated)
- Chairman: Graham Ellis
- Manager: Andrew Ellis
- League: Surrey Premier League
- 2025–26: Southern Counties East League Division One, 17th of 18 (relegated)
| Home colours | Away colours |

Chessington & Hook United Football Club is a football club based in Chessington, Greater London, England. They are currently members of the Surrey Premier League and play at Chalky Lane.

== History ==
The club was founded by Bill Benham in 1921 as Chessington Football Club, joining Division IV of the Kingston and District Football League. They won Division IV and the Surbiton Times Cup in 1922–23, earning promotion to Division III. However, they were relegated back to Division IV at the end of the 1928–29 season after finishing bottom of Division III.

Despite only finishing fifth in Division IV in 1934–35, the club were promoted to Division III. The following two seasons saw them finish bottom of Division III, and they were relegated to Section A of Division IV in 1937, before moving to Section B in 1938. After World War II the club joined the Sutton & District League. They finished bottom of the league's single division in 1945–46, failing to win a match and drawing only twice, and were placed in Division II for the following season. After finishing bottom of Division II in 1947–48, they were relegated to Division IIIA. The 1950–51 season saw them finish bottom of Division IIIA, resulting in relegation to Division Four A.

In 1952–53 Chessington were Division Four A runners-up, earning promotion to Division Three A. After a season of consolidation, they finished second in the division in 1954–55 and were promoted to Division Two. They subsequently won Division Two at the first attempt, as well as winning both the Junior League Cup and the Junior Teck Cup, and were promoted to Division One. After finishing third in their first season, they won Division One in 1957–58, earning promotion to the Premier Division. In 1959–60 they were Premier Division runners-up. They joined the Premier Division of the Middlesex League in 1967, and after finishing second-from-bottom in their first season, they were Premier Division runners-up in 1968–69, after which they left the league.

Renamed Chessington United, the club moved up to the Surrey Senior League in 1971. The league evolved into the Home Counties League in 1978 and the Combined Counties League in 1979. When the league was split into two divisions in 1981, Chessington were placed in the Eastern Division. The league reverted to a single division in 1982, but Chessington left the league after finishing bottom in 1983–84.

In 1986 the club adopted their current name following a merger with Hook Youth/United. They joined the Surrey County Premier League in 1994, and after finishing as runners-up in 1996–97, were promoted to the Combined Counties League. When the league gained a second division in 2003, they were placed in the Premier Division. After finishing bottom of the division in 2013–14 they were relegated to Division One. Despite being promoted back to the Premier Division following a third-place finish in Division One in 2014–15, they were relegated to Division One again at the end of the following season.

At the end of the 2020–21 season Chessington & Hook were transferred to Division One of the Southern Counties East League.

== Ground ==
The club originally played at a ground on Leatherhead Road, which later became a supermarket and housing. In 1924 they moved to the Sir Francis Barker Rec on Leatherhead Road. They currently play at Chalky Lane in Chessington, which is located next to Chessington World of Adventures. Facilities include a seated stand on one side of the pitch, which was installed in 2006 to replace the Bill Bateman Stand. Covered standing is provided behind one goal. The ground currently has a capacity of 3,000, of which 167 is seated and 600 is covered.

== Honours ==
- Surrey Premier Cup
  - Winners 1998–99
- Kingston and District League
  - Division One champions 1957–58
  - Division Two champions 1955–56
  - Division IV champions 1922–23
  - Junior League Cup winners 1955–56
  - Junior Teck Cup winners 1955–56
- Surbiton Times Cup
  - Winners 1922–23

== Records ==
- Highest league Position: 3rd in the Combined Counties Premier Division, 2004–05
- Best FA Cup performance:First qualifying round, 2001–02, 2003–04, 2005–06, 2014–15, 2015–16
- Best FA Vase performance: Fourth round, 2005–06

== See also ==
- Chessington & Hook United F.C. players
