= CB Hounslow & Abbots F.C. =

Association football club in England

Coordinates: 51.4679°N 0.4039°W

CB Hounslow & Abbots
- Full name: CB Hounslow & Abbots Football Club
- Nickname: The Dragons
- Founded: 1989
- Ground: Green Lane, Hounslow
- Capacity: 2,100
- Chairman: Frank James
- Manager: Wes Lennon
- League: Surrey Premier League
- 2025–26: Surrey Premier League, 7th of 14
Home colours

CB Hounslow & Abbots Football Club is a football club based in Hounslow, Greater London, England. Affiliated to the Middlesex County Football Association, they are currently members of the Surrey Premier League and play at Green Lane.

== History ==
The club was originally formed as CB United in 1989 after Richmond Rangers disbanded, and were named after Cater Bank, a company owned by the father of the club chairman and also the club's sponsors. They initially played in the Hounslow & District League, before joining the Senior Division of the Middlesex County League in 1997. After finishing fourth in 1998–99, the club were promoted to the Premier Division. They were runners-up in 2004–05 and again in 2005–06, after which they successfully applied for promotion to Division One of the Combined Counties League.

In 2015–16 the club won Division One, earning promotion to the Premier Division. They were placed in the Premier Division North after league reorganisation in 2021, but finished bottom of the division in 2021–22 and were relegated back to Division One. They subsequently finished bottom of Division One the following season and were relegated to the Surrey Premier League. In 2024 the club was renamed CB Hounslow & Abbots after merging with Hillingdon Abbots.

== Ground ==
The club originally played at the Osterley Sports Club, before starting to groundshare at Bedfont & Feltham's Orchard ground in 2013–14 while a new ground at Green Lane was being built at a cost of £1.5 million. The site had previously been five unused football pitches and was replaced by a ground including a seated stand on one side of the pitch, a covered area behind one goal and a clubhouse. The first match at the new ground was an FA Cup extra-preliminary round tie against Rusthall on 8 August 2017 with the home team winning 2–1.

== Honours ==
- Combined Counties League
  - Division One champions 2015–16

== Records ==
- Best FA Cup performance: First qualifying round, 2016–17
- Best FA Vase performance: First round, 2018–19, 2020–21
