= Windsor F.C. (2011) =

Association football club in England

Coordinates: 51°28′10″N 0°37′22″W

Windsor
- Full name: Windsor Football Club
- Nicknames: The Royalists and The Jacks reflective of the club's distinctive Union Jack playing kits
- Founded: 3 February 2011; 15 years ago
- Ground: Holloways Park
- Chairman: Kevin Stott
- League: Combined Counties League Division One
- 2025–26: Combined Counties League Division One (resigned)
Home colours	Away colours

Windsor Football Club is an English football club formed in 2011 after Windsor & Eton folded. The club were members of the Combined Counties League until 2025 and played at the Holloways Park ground. The club is affiliated to the Berks & Bucks Football Association.

Prior to the start of the 2025–26 season the club resigned from The Combined Counties League to focus its financial and management resources on finding a permanent new ground.

== History ==
The new club was founded in 2011 and placed into the Combined Counties Football League Premier Division. In their first season Windsor FC finished as runners up, only one point behind champions Guildford City, and reached the Berks & Bucks Senior Trophy semi-final losing on penalties to Abingdon Town.

The following season chairman Kevin Stott made the decision to remove the playing budget for the foreseeable future, stating "the club had already lost its way". The decision was made after Stott attended the 2012 London Olympic Games and was humbled by the determination and passion of the Olympians. Stott decided that the focus had to be shifted from paying players to win games at grass-roots level to inspiring youth to be determined to win through passion and loyalty. With the budget removed the manager Keith Scott, his assistant Jim Melvin and the playing squad were offered the chance to stay and play under the new terms or move on. The management and the majority of the squad moved on, their last game together being the first qualifying round for the FA Cup against Didcot Town, after the club had made its debut in the competition starting in the Extra Preliminary Qualification Round. Mick Woodham stepped into the management void and began to build a squad. After steadying the ship Woodham's young squad finished 8th in the table. The following season Woodham's boys finished in the top six and won Windsor F.C.'s first ever trophy, beating Reading Town 3–0 at Chesham United to lift the Berks & Bucks Senior Trophy. In season 2014–15 Woodham led his developing team to a second Berks & Bucks Trophy final victory, this time beating Flackwell Heath 3–2 After Extra Time in a pulsating game at Burnham F.C. Windsor F.C. finished the season in 5th place in the CCL Premier Division. Season 2015–16 was seen as a transition season with many of Woodham's original team moving to Step 4 clubs, eventually finishing 12th in the league. Season 2016-17 Windsor F.C. managed to one better their previous seasons league finish, finishing 11th despite many squad changes throughout the season. For the 2017–18 season Windsor F.C. were moved to the Hellenic League Premier Division. At the end of the 2020–21 season the club were transferred back to the Premier Division North of the Combined Counties League.

== Ground ==
Windsor F.C. – Previous Home ground

Windsor's current home ground since the 2023–24 season was Holloways Park, Beaconsfield in a groundshare agreement with Beaconsfield Town F.C.

Up until the end of the 2022–23 season, Windsor played their home games at Stag Meadow, St Leonards Road, Windsor, Berkshire, SL4 3DR.

The football ground was placed there in 1911 following an order from the Monarchy that an area of The Great Park should have an area for football. The ground was leased to the original Windsor & Eton until their demise on 2 February 2011. Stag Meadow is a traditional non-League football ground with terraces all around the pitch and a small stand on one side. There is capacity for 4,500 inside the ground with 450 of these seated and 650 covered. There is also an officials' bar and a supporters' bar as well as a tea hut and club shop. The pitch is tended to by head groundsman Lewis Clements & George Gould whose company is in charge of the maintenance.

== Honours ==
- Combined Counties Premier Division
  - Runners-up (1): 2011–12
- Berks & Bucks Senior Trophy
  - Winners (2): 2013–14, 2014–15

== Records ==
- Highest attendance – 806, 27 December 2011, vs Egham Town
- All-time top goal scorer – Robert Lazarczuk (88)
- Most goals in a season – Ryan O'Toole (43), 2011–2012
- Most appearances – Robert Lazarczuk (200)
- Most clean sheets in a season – Rob Bullivant (12), 2011–2012
- Biggest victory – 11–0 vs Banstead Athletic, 1 October 2011
- Biggest defeat – 0-9 vs North Greenford United, 31 January 2023
- Highest finish – Runners up, Combined Counties Premier Division 2011–2012
- Best FA Vase place – Quarter Finals 2017–2018
- Best FA Cup place – First Qualifying Round 2012–2013

== Mascot ==
Windsor FC's mascot is Scotty the Stag and he has helped raise money for charity and visited children at Wexham Park Hospital. Scotty has also taken part in a number of mascot races, the first at Windsor Race Course when he managed 3rd place, and the second at the Annual Mascot Grand National at Huntingdon Race Course when he finished 6th. In 2012 he finished second out of 47 runners at the Mascot Grand National at Kempton Park Racecourse. Scotty has also completed the Windsor Half Marathon, walked 26 miles from Windsor Castle to White City (following the Olympic Marathon route of 1908) and has also climbed Mount Snowden – all in aid of Thames Hospicecare. It is estimated Scotty has raised well in excess of £10k for charities. Season 2015–16 has seen Scotty laid low with a severe back injury.

== Youth teams ==
Windsor FC has 28 youth teams in place with over 300 players from the under-7s up to the under-16s. Windsor FC Youth compete locally in the cup competitions and leagues of their age groups. Several players have joined professional club academies, with Max Kinseler and Calvin Morgan joining the Berks & Bucks U-16s as well as Adam Richards and Brandon Blair taking places at the John Madejski Academy. The club has also signed a formal link with Reading with many of the youth team players representing both Windsor FC and Reading FC at their age group. Jack Stacey also played for the club at the beginning of his career before joining the Reading academy.

== Governance ==
The financial basis of the club was expected to be a social enterprise.
