= Hanworth Villa F.C. =

Association football club in England

Coordinates: 51°25′59″N 0°23′48″W

Hanworth Villa
- Full name: Hanworth Villa Football Club
- Nickname: The Villains
- Founded: 1976
- Ground: Rectory Meadow, Hanworth
- Chairman: James Connor
- Manager: Simon Haughney
- League: Southern League Premier Division South
- 2025–26: Isthmian League South Central Division, 3rd of 22 (promoted via play-offs)
Home colours	Away colours

Hanworth Villa Football Club is a football club based in Hanworth, London Borough of Hounslow, England. They are currently members of the Southern League Premier Division South and play at Rectory Meadow.

== History ==
The club was established in 1976 and initially played in the Hounslow & District League. They later transferred to the West Middlesex League before becoming founder members of the Middlesex County League in 1984. League restructuring in 1991 saw Division One reduced from 22 to 12 clubs and renamed the Premier Division, with Hanworth relegated to the renamed Division One. However, a third-place finish in 1991–92 saw them promoted to the Premier Division. In 1993–94 the club were relegated to Division One despite finishing eighth. The following season they finished third in Division One, earning another immediate promotion back to the Premier Division.

In 2002–03 Hanworth were Premier Division champions, also winning the Premier Division Cup with a 3–1 against Stonewall in the final. They were champions again in 2004–05, after which they were promoted to Division One of the Combined Counties League. They won the Division One Challenge Cup in 2006–07 and retained it the following season which also saw them end the season as Division One runners-up. However, they were denied promotion due to their ground failing to meet the necessary criteria. After completing the work during the 2008–09 season, they were promoted at the end of the season after finishing as runners-up again.

In 2011–12 Hanworth won the Southern Combination Challenge Cup and retained the trophy the following season. In 2013–14 they won the Southern Combination Challenge Cup for a second time, as well as winning the Combined Counties League Premier Challenge Cup, beating Spelthorne Sports in the final. The 2015–16 season saw them win the Middlesex Charity Cup for the first time, beating Cockfosters 2–0 in the final. They won the cup again in 2017–18 with a 3–2 win over Spelthorne Sports in the final. The club were Premier Division North champions in 2021–22, earning promotion to the South Central Division of the Isthmian League. In their first season in the Isthmian League they finished fourth in the South Central Division, qualifying for the promotion play-offs. After beating Marlow 2–1 in the semi-finals, the club lost 3–1 to Walton & Hersham in the final. They finished third in 2024~25, going on to beat Ascot United 2–1 in the play-off semi-finals before losing 2–1 to Uxbridge in the final. Following another third-place finish in 2025–26, the club defeated Moneyfields 5–1 in the play-off semi-finals and then beat Westfield 2–0 in the final to secure promotion to the Premier Division South of the Southern League.

== Honours ==
- Combined Counties League
  - Premier Division North champions 2021–22
  - Premier Challenge Cup winners 2013–14
  - Division One Challenge Cup winners 2006–07, 2007–08
- Middlesex County League
  - Premier Division champions 2002–03, 2004–05
  - Premier Division Cup winners 2002–03
- Southern Combination Cup
  - Winners 2011–12, 2013–14
- Middlesex Charity Cup
  - Winners 2015–16, 2017–18

== Records ==
- Best FA Cup performance: Fourth qualifying round, 2011–12
- Best FA Trophy performance: Third qualifying round, 2022–23
- Best FA Vase performance: Fifth round, 2020-21

== See also ==
- Hanworth Villa F.C. players
- Hanworth Villa F.C. managers
