= Frimley Green F.C. =

Association football club in England

Coordinates: 51°18′26″N 0°43′41″W

Frimley Green
- Full name: Frimley Green Football Club
- Nicknames: The Green, The Frimmers
- Founded: 1919
- Ground: The Frimley Green Recreation Ground, Frimley Green
- Capacity: 2,000
- Chairman: James Markham
- Manager: Louis Macey
- League: Wessex League Division One
- 2025–26: Wessex League Division One, 13th of 22
Home colours	Away colours

Frimley Green Football Club is a football club based in Frimley Green, near Camberley, Surrey, England. They are currently members of the Wessex League Division One and play at the Frimley Green Recreation Ground.

== History ==
The club was established in 1919 and won the Surrey Junior Cup in 1927–28. They later joined the Surrey Intermediate League, and after winning back-to-back titles in 1958–59 and 1959–60, they joined the Surrey Senior League. The step up proved difficult and the club initially struggled in the new league, finishing bottom in 1962–63. However, the late 1960s saw several top-half finishes. After finishing bottom of the league again in 1973–74, the club joined the Spartan League. When it merged with the Metropolitan–London League in 1975 to form the London Spartan League, the club were placed in Division Two. They were promoted to Division One at the end of the 1975–76 season.

In 1977 Division One became the Premier Division, and Frimley Green remained in the division until being relegated to the Senior Division in 1979–80. After one season in the Senior Division the club transferred to the Western Division of the Combined Counties League. At the end of their first season in the league it was reduced to a single division. The club won the league's Elite Cup in 1990–91, but left the league after finishing bottom of the table in 1993–94, returning to the Surrey Intermediate League. They won the League Cup in 1998–99, also finishing as league runners-up, earning promotion to the Surrey County Senior League. The club finished as runners-up in the Surrey County Senior League in 2001–02 and were promoted back to the Combined Counties League.

The league gained a second division in 2003, with Frimley Green becoming members of the Premier Division. However, they were relegated to Division One at the end of the 2005–06 season. The club were Division One champions in 2012–13 and were promoted back to the Premier Division. However, after finishing bottom of the division in 2014–15, they were relegated to Division One again. In 2018–19 the club won the Division One Cup and were runners-up in Division One, earning promotion to the Premier Division. They finished bottom of the Premier Division South in 2022–23 and were relegated to Division One of the Wessex League.

== Honours ==
- Combined Counties League
  - Division One champions 2012–13
  - Division One Cup winners 2018–19
  - Elite Cup winners 1990–91
- Surrey County Intermediate League (Western)
  - Champions 1958–59, 1959–60
  - League Cup winners 1998–99
- Surrey County Senior League
  - Charity Cup winners 1967–68
- Surrey Junior Cup
  - Winners 1927–28

== Records ==
- Best FA Cup performance: Preliminary round, 2004–05, 2005–06, 2008–09, 2013–14
- Best FA Vase performance: Third round, 2008–09
- Record attendance: 1,152 vs AFC Wimbledon, 2002–03
- Biggest win: 7–0 vs Andover Town, Wessex League Division One, 7 March 2024
- Heaviest defeat: 8–0 vs Horley Town, Combined Counties Premier South, 2022–23

== See also ==
- Frimley Green F.C. players
