= Eversley & California F.C. =

Association football club in England

Coordinates: 51.3515°N 0.8562°W

Eversley & California
- Full name: Eversley & California Football Club
- Nickname: The Boars
- Founded: 1910
- Ground: Fox Lane, Eversley
- Chairman: Martin Elcox
- Manager: Vacant
- League: Combined Counties League Premier Division South
- 2025–26: Combined Counties League Premier Division South, 18th of 20
Home colours	Away colours

Eversley & California Football Club is a football club based in Eversley, Hampshire, England. They are currently members of the Combined Counties League Premier Division South and play at the Eversley Sports Association ground and complex.

== History ==
Eversley Football Club was established in 1910. The club played in the Aldershot Senior League and Surrey County Intermediate League (Western), before becoming founder members of the Surrey Elite Intermediate Football League in 2008. They won the league in its first season, also winning the league's Challenge Cup. They were subsequently promoted to Division One of the Combined Counties League.

In 2012 the club merged with California, a youth football club established in 1975 in California in Berkshire, changing its name to Eversley & California. In 2013–14 they were Division One runners-up, but were unable to take promotion due to restrictions on use of the floodlights at the ground. In 2023–24 the club finished fourth in Division One, qualifying for the promotion play-offs, in which they lost 2–0 to Berks County FC in the semi-finals. The following season saw another fourth-place finish. In the subsequent play-offs, they defeated Penn & Tylers Green on penalties, before beating Westside 1–0 in the final to earn promotion to the Premier Division South.

== Ground ==
The club play at the Eversley Sports Association on Fox Lane. The ground was originally the home of California, who developed the site, which was reclaimed land, after receiving a Football Foundation grant of £666,556 in 2007. The ground opened in 2009, featuring a railed pitch and a 57-seat stand. The entire complex cost £2.1m. When floodlights were installed, their use was restricted to 15 October–1 April. However, this was later extended from 1 August–30 April.

== Honours ==
- Surrey Elite Intermediate League
  - Champions 2008–09
  - Challenge Cup winners 2008–09

== Records ==
- Best FA Cup performance: Extra preliminary round, 2025–26
- Best FA Vase performance: Second round, 2023–24

== See also ==
- Eversley & California F.C. managers
