= South Park F.C. =

Association football club in England

Coordinates: 51°13′24″N 0°12′56″W

South Park Reigate
- Full name: South Park Reigate Football Club
- Nickname: The Sparks
- Founded: 1897
- Stadium: Whitehall Lane
- Chairman: Tom Cope
- Manager: Josh Gallagher
- League: Isthmian League South East Division
- 2025–26: Isthmian League South Central Division, 10th of 22 (transferred)
- Website: southparkfootballclub.co.uk
Home colours	Away colours

South Park Reigate Football Club are an English football club based in Reigate, Surrey. The club is affiliated to the Surrey County Football Association. They play in the Isthmian League South East Division.

== History ==
The club was founded in 1897 and joined the Redhill and District Football League as a founding member. The facilities of the club were very basic to start with, with the club playing on a sports field between Crescent and Church Roads. 1925 brought a partnership with the local cricket club which formed the South Park Sports Association, the association aimed to improve athletic facilities for the two clubs and the people of South Park.

The new association found suitable land on Whitehall Lane, the current home of South Park F.C., and purchased four acres through subscriptions and door-to-door collections. Further purchases of two and four acres respectively ensured that the ground would remain a permanent sports home by vesting them to the National Playing Fields Association. The entire allotment was renamed "King George's Field" in 1935.

The club took a hit during and immediately after World War II, however, an air raid shelter on King George's Field proved to be a defining feature of the landscape for the club in its rebound after the war. Donations ensured amenities were added to the shelter, such as a clubhouse, showers, and toilets, to provide the club with much-needed improvements to fulfill its sporting aspirations. After this period the club continued playing in the local leagues, where they achieved some success over the years.

A historical South Park FC club badge

In 2001, nearby Reigate Town Football Club moved into South Park and merged with the current club. As a result, the club was renamed South Park & Reigate Town Football Club until 2003 when they reverted to South Park Football Club. Even more renovations were made to King George's Field with the installation of floodlights and new changing rooms.

2006 saw the club's promotion from the Crawley & District League to the Combined Counties Football League Division One. The club's first ever FA Vase match was held in 2008–09, a second qualifying round 2–1 home defeat to Shoreham.

In 2010, South Park participated in the FA Cup for the first time. They beat Greenwich Borough and Horsham YMCA to set up a tie with Cray Wanderers. That season also saw the club gain promotion to the Combined Counties Football League Premier Division, and won a cup double of the Combined Counties Division one cup and the Surrey County premier Cup.

In the 2011–12 season South Park reached the last 32 of the FA Vase competition where they were eventually overcome by the holders Whitley Bay.

In the 2012–13 season the club achieved its best-ever performance in the FA Cup, reaching the fourth qualifying round, where they were beaten 3–0 at home by Metropolitan Police.

In the 2013–13 season, the club won the Combined Counties Premier division, being promoted to the Isthmian League Division One South. After a reorganisation of the Isthmian League structure occurred for the 2018–19 season the club became a member of the Isthmian League South Central Division.

South Park updated their badge in July 2018. In October 2018, manager Mick Sullivan, who joined at the start of the season, left the club. Jay Lovett was named manager later that month. In November 2019, Martin Dynan replaced Lovett. Harrison Williams took charge of the club in February 2022. In November 2022, Harrison left the club and his assistant Tom Cope took over the side and was named the First Team Manager.

South Park renamed themselves South Park Reigate in July 2022, the decision was made by the club as they believe it will enhance their profile locally as well as in the wider football community.

In the 2023–24 season, manager Tom Cope lead the club on to have their most successful season in club history. They reached the Third round of the FA Trophy after beating Bognor Regis Town of higher league standing, 4–1 away and went on to play Hereford away in the Third round. They narrowly lost 1-0 to the team who were 3 divisions higher than them, ending their run but making their first ever appearance in the third round in the competition. South Park also went on that season to win the Surrey Senior Cup, beating high flyers Farnham Town and ending their 40+ game winning streak.

Season 2024-25 began with mixed results and Rob Kember was appointed as the new Manager in November 2024. The recovery when it came was significant and the team finished strongly to avoid relegation and ensure another season in the Isthmian South Central Division.

== Ground ==
Pavilion at Whitehall Lane, the club's home ground

South Park plays their home games at Whitehall Lane, South Park, Reigate, Surrey RH2 8LG.

The club benefits from an excellent 3G pitch that supports the first team, youth section, Vets and wider community.

== Non-playing staff ==
As of October 2026.

Position	Name
Chairman	Tom Cope
Vice Chairman	Dean Glen
Club Secretary	Nick Thatcher
Manager	Josh Gallagher
Assistant manager	Jake Gallagher
Coach	Chris Williams
Physio	Laura Fullana-Perez

The club is run by a board of directors, including the aforementioned Tom Cope and Nick Thatcher, who all take on specific roles. Alongside them, Joe McElligott as director of football, Steve Robb as treasurer and Neil Morris as press officer make up the group.

== Awards and honours ==
- Combined Counties Football League Premier Division
  - Champions: 2013–14
- Surrey FA Saturday Premier Cup:
  - Winners: 2010–11
- Combined Counties Football League Premier Cup
  - Runners up: 2012–13
- Combined Counties Football League Division One Cup:
  - Winners: 2010–11
- Surrey Senior County Cup:
  - Winners: 2023-24

== Records ==
- Highest League Position:
  - 1st in Combined Counties Premier Division: 2013–14
- FA Cup best performance:
  - Fourth qualifying round: 2012–13
- FA Vase best performance:
  - Fourth round: 2011–12
- FA Trophy best performance:
  - Third round: 2023–24
- Highest Attendance:
  - 643 vs Metropolitan Police: October 20, 2012

== See also ==
- South Park F.C. players
- South Park F.C. managers
