= Worcester Park F.C. =

Association football club in England

Coordinates: 51°22′54″N 0°14′38″W

Worcester Park
- Full name: Worcester Park Football Club
- Nicknames: The Park, The Skinners
- Founded: 1921
- Ground: Skinners Field, Worcester Park
- Chairman: Anthony Browne
- Manager: David Cheeseman & Gary Taylor
- League: Surrey Premier League
- 2025–26: Surrey Premier League, 5th of 14
- Website: worcesterparkfc.com
Home colours	Away colours

Worcester Park Football Club is a football club based in Worcester Park in the London Borough of Sutton, England. Part of the Worcester Park Athletic Club, they are currently members of the Surrey Premier League and play at Skinners Field.

== History ==
The club was formally established in 1921. They won the Surrey Junior Cup in 1937–38, beating Kingswood Wanderers 4–2 in the final. In 1946 they joined the Surrey Senior League, remaining in the league until 1963. After dropping into intermediate leagues, the club were founder members of the Surrey County Premier League in 1982, but left the league after two seasons. They rejoined in 1995 and were runners-up in 1995–96, before leaving again at the end of the 1996–97 season. After winning the Surrey Intermediate Cup in 1998–99 with a 2–1 win over Godstone, the club rejoined the league again in 1999 and were champions in 1999–2000 and 2000–01, by which time it had been renamed the Surrey County Senior League.

After finishing fifth in the Surrey County Senior League in 2002–03 Worcester Park were promoted to the new Division One of the Combined Counties League. They were Division One runners-up in 2009–10, but could not be promoted due to the ground lacking floodlights. They won the division the following season, but were again denied promotion.

Worcester Park won the Division One Cup in 2015–16, beating Bedfont & Feltham 1–0 in the final. They won the Surrey Premier Cup in 2017–18 after beating Banstead Athletic on penalties in the final. The club were Division One champions again in 2017–18, but were relegated to the Surrey Elite Intermediate League after failing ground grading requirements. They were champions of the renamed Surrey Premier County League in 2021–22, and won the Surrey Intermediate Cup again in 2022–23, beating Frenches Athletic 1–0 in the final.

In 2024–25 Worcester Park won the Surrey Intermediate Cup again, defeating Kew Park Rangers 5–0 in the final. The following season saw them win the Surrey Premier County League champions and retain the Surrey Intermediate Cup, defeating Dial Square on penalties in the final.

== Ground ==
Worcester Park play their home games at Skinners Field on Green Lane, which is shared with a cricket club.

== Honours ==
- Combined Counties League
  - Division One champions 2010–11
  - Division One Cup winners 2015–16
- Surrey Premier County League
  - Champions 2021–22, 2025–26
- Surrey County Senior League
  - Champions 1999–2000, 2000–01
- Surrey Premier Cup
  - Winners 2016–17
- Surrey Intermediate Cup
  - Winners 1998–99, 2022–23, 2025–26
- Surrey Junior Cup
  - Winners 1937–38
