= Spelthorne Sports F.C. =

Association football club in England

Coordinates: 51°25′16″N 0°26′19″W

Spelthorne Sports
- Full name: Spelthorne Sports Football Club
- Nickname: The Spelly
- Founded: 1922
- Ground: Spelthorne Sports Club, Ashford, Surrey
- Chairman: Andy Lee
- Manager: Paul Burgess
- League: Combined Counties League Division One
- 2025–26: Combined Counties League Division One, 18th of 23
- Website: https://www.spelthornesportsfc.com
Home colours	Away colours

Spelthorne Sports F.C. is a football club based in the borough of Spelthorne, Surrey, England. They play in the Combined Counties League Division One.

== History ==
Spelthorne Sports Football Club, nicknamed The Spelly, was formed in 1922. The team won the Surrey Elite Intermediate League in the 2010–11 season, gaining promotion to Division One of the Combined Counties League. As well as winning the Surrey Elite Intermediate League title in 2011, the club also won the League Challenge Cup, beating Ripley F.C. in the final.

In 2013–14, Spelthorne won the Middlesex FA Intermediate Cup, beating Middlesex County Premier side Cricklewood Wanderers 3–0 in the Final. Second half goals from Robert Smith (2), and Lee Staples ensured the victory. The match played at North Greenford United on 26 March 2014.

In 2014, Spelthorne Sports were crowned Combined Counties Division One Champions with a 2–1 win away to Epsom Athletic. They lifted the trophy 3 days later following an emphatic 7–0 win at home to local rivals Staines Lammas. They also won the RPM Records Division One Challenge Cup against Staines Lammas at Windsor FC that year, with a single second half Lee Staples goal, winning the league and cup treble in the process. The team went on a 46 game unbeaten run in all competitions that season, beating teams in cup competitions from higher divisions, finally ending in May 2014 with a 1–0 loss to Hanworth Villa in the Southern Combination Cup Final. The game was played at home and was the club's first game under newly installed floodlights.

The 2013–14 season was successful for Spelthorne Sports, winning two cup finals, and finishing runners-up in another two cup finals. The biggest achievement was winning the league without losing a game in the process: winning 22, drawing 8, losing 0, scoring 92, and conceding 23.

In the 2019–20 FA Vase, Spelthorne Sports were drawn against de facto reserve side AFC Spelthorne Sports, winning 4–1.

== Ground ==
Their home ground is the Spelthorne Sports Club in Ashford Common. It has a grass pitch, floodlights and a covered seating area holding 50 seats behind the goal at the clubhouse end. On 2 April 2014 the club passed the necessary ground grading inspection which means it is at the grade 'G' required for playing at step six of the National League System.

== Staff ==
- 1st Team Manager – Paul Burgess
- 1st Assistant Manager – Darren Lake
- 1st Team Coaches - Matt Bowers & Chris Flowers

== Honours and records ==
=== League honours ===
- Surrey Elite Intermediate League
  - Champions: 2010–11
- Combined Counties League Division One
  - Champions: 2013–14

=== Cup honours ===
- Southern Combination Cup
  - Runners up: 2012–13, 2013–14
- Middlesex FA Intermediate Cup
  - Winners: 2013–14
- RPM Records Division One Challenge Cup
  - Winners: 2013–14
- Cherry Red Records Premier Challenge Cup
  - Runners up: 2013–14
- Fripp-Smith Trophy
  - Runners up: 2020–21

=== Records ===
- Record FA Cup performance: First qualifying round, 2018-19, 2019-20, 2021-22, 2022-23
- Record FA Vase performance: Third round, 2024–25
