= Colliers Wood United F.C. =

Association football club in England

Coordinates: 51°25′18″N 0°15′7″W

Colliers Wood United
- Full name: Colliers Wood United Football Club
- Nickname: The Wood
- Founded: 1874 (as Vandyke)
- Ground: Wibbandune Sports Ground, Wimbledon
- Capacity: 2,000 (102 seated)
- Chairman: Steve Turner
- Manager: Gavin Bolger
- League: Combined Counties League Division One
- 2025–26: Combined Counties League Division One, 11th of 23
Home colours	Away colours

Colliers Wood United Football Club is an English semi-professional football club based in West Wimbledon in the London Borough of Merton. The club is affiliated to the Surrey County Football Association. The club are currently members of the Combined Counties League Division One and play at the Wibbandune Sports Ground.

== History ==
Official Website - https://www.collierswoodunited.com/

Founded in 1874, Colliers Wood United Football Club is one of the oldest football clubs in England and has now been in existence for 152 years. They received a well deserved recognition award from the FA for 125 years of playing football during 2011 and the 150 year award was received in 2024. The early years of their existence were spent in the Wimbledon and Sutton leagues before moving on to the Surrey Intermediate League (Southern Division). Much later, during the late 1960s and early 1970s, the club were members of the Surrey Senior League for a short time, playing in the newly formed division one where they won the league title in 1969/70. The reserves won their division in 1970/71 going undefeated. Over the years, “The Wood” have reached a number of Surrey FA Cup Finals. In 1988/89 they lost 1–2 to Bradbank Sports in the Intermediate Cup Final. In 1991/92 they beat Woking & Horsell 4–0 in the final of the same competition. The reserves reached the final of the 1988/89 and 1989/90 Lower Junior Cup but were beaten on both occasions. The local recreation ground limited the progress of the club due to the basic facilities and a search for a new ground was launched. Adequate facilities were found at Wibbandune Sports Ground in 1991 and the ground has steadily improved since then. 2001/2 saw the club enter the Surrey County Senior League where they finished a creditable 5th. The following season, they finished as runners up. In 2002/3, the league amalgamated with the Combined Counties League and the club were founder members of the new division 1 where they finished as runners up and were promoted to the Premier Division. They have continued to improve. In 2004/5, they finished 14th of the 24 clubs. The following season, they finished fourth and had a fine FA Vase run, beating Chichester City United, Raynes Park Vale and Greenwich Borough, before losing to VCD Athletic in the 2nd round proper. In 2006/7 they entered the FA Cup for the first time, defeating Chipstead after a replay before succumbing to Worthing 0–3. After a brief ground share at Croydon FC, the club moved back to Wibbandune where ground improvements included the addition of excellent flood-lighting, a new covered terrace and a 120-seat stand. In March 2012, the club added a new away team changing room, new spectator ground lavatories and relaid the entire playing surface including drainage thanks to a £71,000 grant from the Football Association. They also reached the 2011/12 final of the League Cup at Farnborough FC on 4 May v Guernsey FC in front of 667 spectators, which they lost 0–2 after extra time, becoming the first club to keep a 90-minute clean sheet against The Islanders. Following a second renovation of the pitch in April, the club returned to Wibbandune in July 2013 and the under 18 youth section was restarted.

In 2014/15, Wood reached the FA Vase 4th round (last 32 nationally) and the Surrey Senior Cup quarter finals for the first time in their history. They reached the final of the League Cup once again in 2014/15 but, yet again, they lost in extra time, this time 1–2 to Camberley Town in front of 385 spectators at Woking FC. Wood reached the Surrey FA Senior Cup quarter finals for only the second time in 2017/18 before losing to National League side Dorking Wanderers 0–6 at Wibbandune.

On 8 March 2016 the club were awarded the FA Charter Standard accreditation by the Football Association.

The club won the CCL Sportsmanship Award for 2015/16 having received just 32 cautions throughout the season.

In 2020, the club installed new ground perimeter fencing and a new pitch rail in line with current FA ground gradings.

In 2023, new LED floodlights were installed.

In April 2024, the 1st team were relegated from the Combined Counties Premier South division ending 20 years at step 5, and they were placed in the CCL Division 1 for the 2024/25 season. The club received a plaque from the Surrey FA to celebrate 150 years of the club's existence.

Gavin Bolger was appointed 1st team manager on 19th June 2024, replacing Terry Savage who had resigned earlier in the week.

In 2025/26, The Wood won the CCL Division 1 fair play award.

== Ground ==
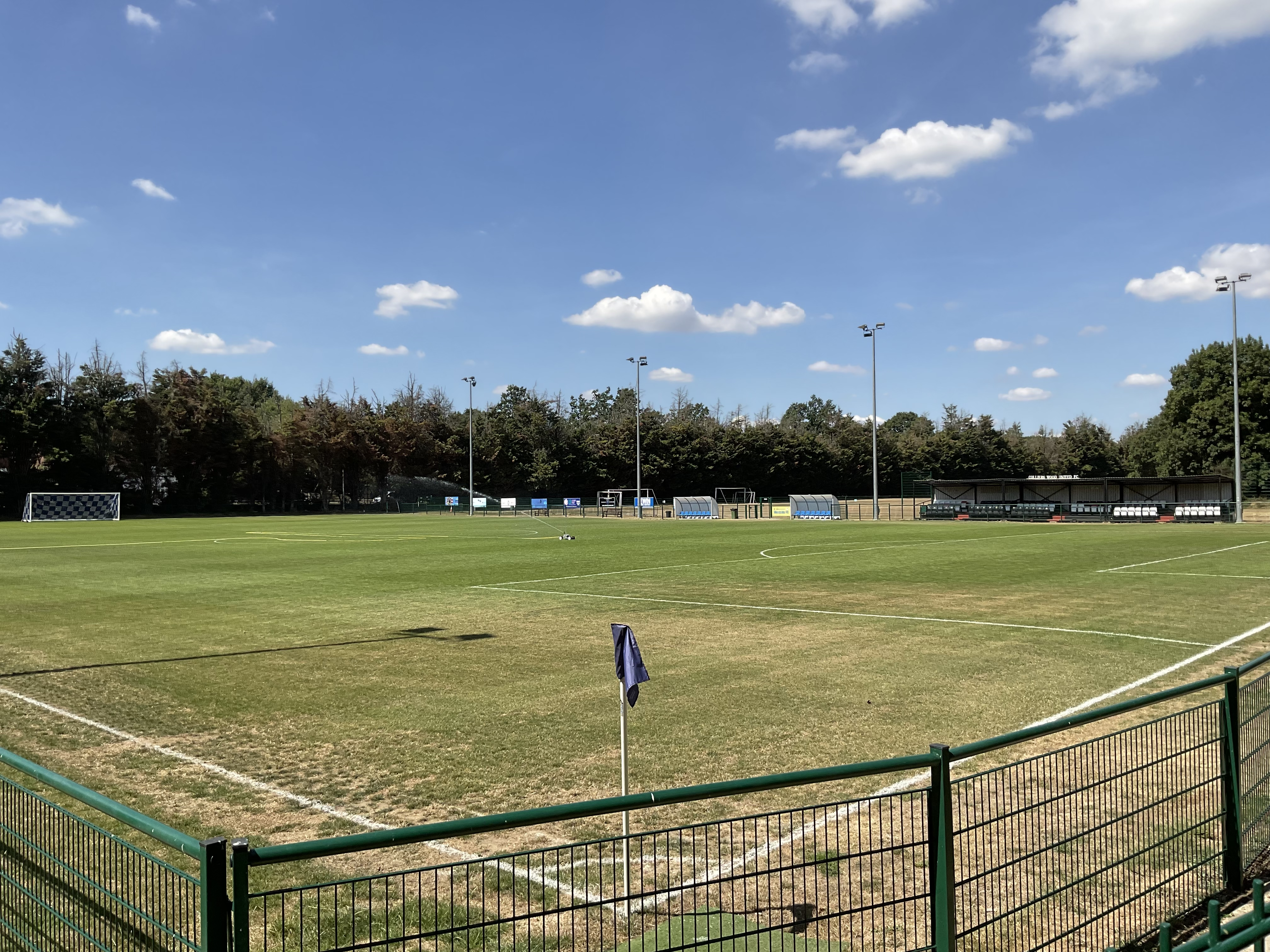
Wibbandune Sports Ground

Colliers Wood United play their home games at Wibbandune Sports Ground, A3 Southbound, Opposite 199–213 Robin Hood Way, Wimbledon, SW20 0AA.

The ground has a 102-seater covered stand. Funding was granted for work to be carried out in installing a drainage system under the pitch for the 2012–13 season, which resulted in the club playing some of its home games at Cobham that season.

== Honours ==
=== League honours ===
- Combined Counties Football League Division One
  - Runners up: 2003–04
- Surrey County Premier League
  - Champions: 1997–98
  - Runners up: 1999–00, 2000–01, 2002–03
- Surrey Senior League Division One
  - Champions: 1969–70

=== Cup honours ===
- Combined Counties Football League Premier Challenge Cup
  - Runners up: 2012 and 2015
- Surrey FA Saturday Premier Cup :
  - Winners: 1997–98
- Surrey Intermediate Cup
  - Winners: 1991–92
  - Runners up: 1988–89
- Surrey Premier League Challenge Cup
  - Winners: 1995

== Records ==
- Highest League Position: 4th in Combined Counties League Premier Division 2005–06
- FA Cup best performance: Second Qualifying Round 2016/17
- FA Vase best performance: Fourth Round 2014/15
- Highest Attendance: 288 v AFC Wimbledon (Surrey Senior Cup) 2010
- Record Win: 10-0 v Sheerwater F.C. (1900) 5 November 2022
