= Sheerwater F.C. =

Association football club in England

Coordinates: 51.3368°N 0.5258°W

Sheerwater
- Full name: Sheerwater Football Club
- Nickname: The Sheers
- Founded: 1958
- Ground: Eastwood Centre
- Capacity: 600
- Chairman: Chris Machay
- Manager: TJ Barbato
- League: Combined Counties League Premier Division South
- 2025–26: Combined Counties League Premier Division South, 9th of 20
Home colours	Away colours

Sheerwater F.C. are a Non-League football club who are based in Sheerwater, in Woking, Surrey, England. They play their home fixtures at the Eastwood Centre and are members of the Combined Counties League Premier Division South.

== History ==
The club was founded in 1958, by John French, and they began life as members of the Woking & District League. After achieving Intermediate status, they joined the Surrey County Intermediate League (Western) in 1967. The club was a founding member of the Home Counties League in 1978, which was renamed a year later to the Combined Counties League. They are currently members of the Combined Counties Premier Division.

The Jam played some of their early gigs at the clubhouse, before releasing their breakthrough song "In The City". Paul Weller, Bruce Foxton and Rick Buckler all went to Sheerwater Secondary School which is now called The David Brown Secondary School and is situated adjacent to Sheerwater Football Club.

The club has played in the Combined Counties League since the 2000s, although they did enjoy a brief spell in the Combined Counties in the early 1980s. For most of their time in the Combined Counties First Division, they have finished either mid-table or bottom of the league yet survived in this league due to a lack of suitable replacements from Step 7.

The club were the victim of a hoax in 2007 when investment into the club was promised but not delivered. The event could have spelt the end of the club, but they survived into the current decade.

Club Stalwart Trevor Wenden has been at the club in a number of different capacities since the 1970s.

TJ Barbato era (2024–present)

In January 2024, TJ Barbato was appointed manager with Luke stone as assistant manager of Sheerwater following the departure of Gareth Price and David McHugh, taking charge alongside assistant Sean Wallace. He inherited a side at the bottom of the Combined Counties League Premier Division South during a difficult campaign.

Barbato made an immediate impact, guiding the team to a 2–1 victory over Horley Town in his first match in charge, which helped lift Sheerwater off the foot of the table. Despite limited time, he successfully stabilised the club and ensured their survival in the division at the end of the 2023–24 season.

The 2024–25 season, Barbato’ s first full campaign in charge, saw Sheerwater consolidate their league status, with improved consistency and a move away from relegation concerns. The club focused on rebuilding the squad and establishing a more competitive foundation within the Combined Counties League Premier Division South.

The 2025–26 season saw Sheerwater continue to progress under Barbato, producing a more competitive and consistent campaign in the League, FA Vase, and Surrey Senior Cup. The club finished the season with a club-record 54 points, beating the previous record of 53 points —the highest points total in Sheerwater's history at this level of the football pyramid—securing their joint highest ever finish of 9th in the CCL Premier Division.

== Ground ==
Eastwood Leisure Centre, the club's home ground

Sheerwater played their home games at Woking Athletic Ground, Sheerwater Recreation Ground, Blackmore Crescent, Sheerwater, Woking, Surrey, GU21 5QJ until the end of the 2017/18 season. From August 2018 until the end of the 2020/21 season, The Sheers played their home games at the Kingfield Stadium, home to National League club Woking while their new Eastwood Centre ground, which houses a third generation artificial pitch and forms part of a multi-leisure facility, was being built in the grounds of Bishop David Brown School in Sheerwater.

The Sheers commemorated the official opening of Eastwood with a fixture against Woking on 24 July 2021, which resulted in a 3–0 home defeat. The ground has a capacity of 600 spectators.

== Club Records ==
- Highest League Position:
  - 1st in Combined Counties League Division One: 2018–19
  - 4th in Combined Counties League Division One: 2017–18
  - 9th in Combined Counties League Division One: 2008–09, 2016–17,
  - 16th in Combined Counties League Premier Division: 2019–20
  - 10th in Combined Counties League Premier Division: 2020–21
  - 9th in Combined Counties League Premier Division: 2021–22, 2025–26
- FA VASE
  - 2nd Round Proper: 2021–22, 2025–26
- Best FA Cup performance: Preliminary qualifying round, 2022–23, 2023–24
