= Sutton Common Rovers F.C. =

English football club

Coordinates: 51°18′17″N 0°4′47″W

Sutton Common Rovers
- Full name: Sutton Common Rovers Football Club
- Nicknames: The Commoners, SCR
- Founded: 1978
- Ground: War Memorial Sports Ground, Colston Ave, Sutton, Carshalton SM5 2PW
- Capacity: 5000
- Chairman: Alan Salmon
- Manager: Darren Salmon & Lee Flavin
- League: Combined Counties League Premier Division South
- 2024–25: Isthmian League South Central Division, 21st of 22 (relegated)
Home colours	Away colours

Sutton Common Rovers Football Club is a semi-professional football club currently competing in the Combined Counties League Premier Division South. Originally based in sutton common, the club moved southwest to Leatherhead, Surrey, in 2007 upon joining the Combined Counties League. At the start of the 2009–10 season the club moved into a groundshare with Cobham at the Reg Madgwick Stadium, and further away from Sutton. At the end of the 2014–15 season the club announced that it would be groundsharing with Sutton United for the 2015–16 season. For the 2022–23 season, the club announced a move to Church Road (Whyteleafe FC's old ground). In the 2024–2025 season the club announced they would move back to the London Borough of Sutton to Carshalton Athletic's ground.

Sutton Common Rovers won the 2018–19 Cherry Red Records Premier Challenge Cup.

== History ==
The club was formed in 1978, by Alan Salmon, as Inrad F.C. and was later called Centre 21 F.C. following a sponsorship deal before changing name once again to Sutton Common Rovers (SCR) with the SCR being followed by various names, SCR PLOUGH, SCR GRAPES, SCR LITTEN TREE and SCR Kingfisher which changed when club sponsorships changed. The club started in Saturday league football in 2004–05 and dropped the sponsorship names, becoming just SCR as the club wanted to distance itself from the image of being a pub team.

In the 2006–07 campaign the club was playing in the Surrey South Eastern Combination league, where they finished third on goal difference, and had an application to join the Combined Counties League rejected. The following season the club joined the Middlesex County League Premier Division and finished in third place which this time earned the club promotion to the Combined Counties League. In 2008 they were renamed Mole Valley SCR and after missing promotion on goal difference in their debut season, they won division one the following season and were promoted to the premier division. As a consequence of this promotion they were eligible to play in the FA Cup, having also featured in the FA Vase the season before, making their debut in the Extra Preliminary round against Chertsey Town, but losing 5–0.

The club managed to stay in the Premier Division for two seasons before being relegated back to Division one at the end of the 2011–12 campaign.

The 2012–13 campaign saw the side put together a 20-game unbeaten run, which led to a 2nd-placed finish and promotion back to the Premier Division. The club retained its Premier Division status on the final day of the 2013–2014 season with a 4–4 draw against Horley Town.

The 2014–15 season saw the club win an FA Cup tie for the first time in their history, winning 3–2 at Chichester City in the Extra Preliminary Round. A run of two wins in fifteen games in 2015 saw the side threatened with relegation. Two wins and a draw from their final four games saw them survive by one point.

At the end of the season, with the club returning to the London Borough of Sutton, the club changed its name to Sutton Common Rovers.

The 2015–16 season saw the club exit the FA Cup in the Extra-Preliminary Round away at Croydon 5–1. The FA Vase saw the club reach the 4th Round Proper for the first time, after wins at Cobham 3–0 (2nd Qualifying Round); at Worthing Utd 1–0 (1st round Proper); at home to Beckenham Town 3–2 (2nd Rd) and at Eastbourne Town 3–2 (3rd Rd), before defeat at eventual semi-finalists Bowers & Pitsea 3–0 in the 4th Round.

A run of five league wins from January to April saw the club threatened with relegation but points gained in the first half of the season helped them to finish 19th and ensure another season in the Combined Counties Premier Division. Prior to the start of the 2016–17 season the senior section was awarded full FA Charter Standard status. SCR finished the 2016–17 season mid-table in 12th. On 1 May 2017, SCR defeated Camberley Town 4–1 to win the club's first Southern Combination Challenge Cup.

2017–18 saw the club introduce an U21 side into the newly formed Combined Counties League U21 division. The Reserves continue to play in the Surrey Elite League Reserve division. The senior side finished the season 3rd in the Combined Counties Premier Division, their most successful campaign for five seasons, narrowly missing out on promotion to the Isthmian League. They also reached the Challenge Cup semi-finals but were unable to defend their title.

2018–19 was the most successful in the club's history, with a 2nd-placed finish in the Combined Counties Premier Division, behind champions Chertsey Town, and winning the Cherry Red Records Premier Challenge Cup, thanks to a 1–0 win over CB Hounslow Utd, in the final played at Windsor. The side also reached the Southern Combination Cup final, losing 4–2 after extra time to Walton Casuals.

The U23's won the Combined Counties Development Division, and reached the final of the Development Division Cup, and the Reserves won the Surrey Elite Reserve Division Cup, and the Surrey Elite Spring League Cup, and finished runners up in the Surrey Elite Reserve Division.

Rovers were sitting in 8th spot in the table when the 2019–20 season was prematurely ended. They had also reached the 5th Round of the FA Vase for the first time in the clubs history.

For the 2022–23 season Rovers are running three senior sides, the 1st team in the Pitching In South Central Division; the U23's in the Combined Counties John Bennett Development Division; and the U18's in the Isthmian Youth League (East Division).

== Ground ==
For the 2022–23 season, the club announced a move to Church Road (Whyteleafe FC's old ground) now privately owned by a company called IRama. In 2024, they announced they were moving to Carshalton Athletic's ground.

== Youth teams ==
Sutton Common Rovers set up three youth sides in 2010 and originally played at Beddington Park before a move to Stanley Park, Wallington in for the 2012–13 season. In 2012 the youth section was awarded FA Charter Standard status. The Colts teams moved again, this time to Hannibal Way, Wallington at the start of the 2013–14 season.

== Seasons ==
Season	League Record										
Season	Division	Tier	P	W	D	L	F	A	GD	Pts	Pos
2015-16	Combined Counties Football League Premier Division	9	42	13	6	23	66	85	-19	45	19th
2016–17	Combined Counties Football League Premier Division	9	44	18	5	21	64	72	-8	59	13th
2017–18	Combined Counties Football League Premier Division	9	42	27	6	9	92	48	44	87	3rd
2018–19	Combined Counties Football League Premier Division	9	38	23	9	6	85	48	37	78	2nd
2021–22	Isthmian League – South Central Division	8	36	10	4	22	46	82	-36	34	17th
2022–23	Isthmian League – South Central Division	8	38	10	7	21	45	71	-23	37	17th

== Honours ==
=== League honours ===
- Combined Counties League Premier Division
  - Runners-up: 2018–19
- Combined Counties League Division One
  - Winners: 2009–10
  - Runners-up: 2012–13

=== Cup honours ===
- Combined Counties League Cherry Red Records Premier Challenge Cup
  - Winners: 2018–19
- Combined Counties League Division One
  - Runners-up: 2008–09
- Middlesex County League Premier Division Cup
  - Runners-up: 2007–08
- Southern Combination Challenge Cup
  - Winners: 2016–17
  - Runners up: 2018–19
- Surrey Premier Cup
  - Runners-up: 2009–10

== Records ==
=== Mole Valley Sutton Common Rovers FC ===
- Highest League Position: 8th in Combined Counties League Premier Division 2010–11
- FA Cup: Preliminary round, 2014–15 (replay)
- FA Vase: First round, 2009–10

=== Sutton Common Rovers FC ===
- Highest League Position: 2nd in Combined Counties League Premier Division 2018–19
- FA Cup: Second qualifying round, 2021–22 (replay)
- FA Trophy: Second qualifying round, 2021–22
- FA Vase: Fifth round, 2019–20
