= 1987–88 Combined Counties Football League =

The 1987–88 Combined Counties Football League season was the tenth in the history of the Combined Counties Football League, a football competition in England.

The league was won by British Aerospace (Weybridge) for the third time.

== League table ==
Combined Counties Football League
- Season: 1987–88
- Champions: British Aerospace (Weybridge)
- Matches: 306
- Goals: 1,042 (3.41 per match)

The league remained at 18 clubs after Virginia Water left the league, and one new club joined:

- Bedfont, joining from the Surrey Premier League.

Pos	Team	Pld	W	D	L	GF	GA	GD	Pts
1	British Aerospace (Weybridge)	34	22	6	6	83	43	+40	72
2	Merstham	34	22	3	9	85	34	+51	69
3	Farnham Town	34	20	9	5	73	33	+40	69
4	Cobham	34	20	3	11	68	45	+23	63
5	Godalming Town	34	16	12	6	59	32	+27	60
6	Malden Town	34	18	6	10	73	50	+23	60
7	Chipstead	34	14	12	8	64	40	+24	54
8	Malden Vale	34	14	11	9	87	53	+34	53
9	Horley Town	34	15	6	13	58	53	+5	51
10	Hartley Wintney	34	12	12	10	49	50	−1	48
11	Bedfont	34	10	10	14	59	61	−2	40
12	Cove	34	10	10	14	51	55	−4	40
13	Ash United	34	9	11	14	43	55	−12	38
14	Farleigh Rovers	34	10	8	16	46	61	−15	38
15	Chobham	34	11	5	18	50	72	−22	38
16	Cranleigh	34	9	10	15	50	52	−2	37
17	Frimley Green	34	4	4	26	34	102	−68	16
18	Westfield	34	0	2	32	10	151	−141	2

Rules for classification: The system of using goal difference to separate two teams tied on points was used.
