= 1990–91 Combined Counties Football League =

Football season

The 1990–91 Combined Counties Football League season was the 13th in the history of the Combined Counties Football League, a football competition in England.

The league was won by Farnham Town for the first time. There was no promotion this season.

== League table ==
Combined Counties Football League
- Season: 1990–91
- Champions: Farnham Town
- Matches: 272
- Goals: 894 (3.29 per match)

The league was reduced to 17 clubs from 18 after Cove were promoted to the Isthmian League, and Weybridge Town and Chobham left the league. Two new clubs joined:

- Ashford Town, joining from the Surrey Premier League.
- Sandhurst Town, joining from the Chiltonian League.

Pos	Team	Pld	W	D	L	GF	GA	GD	Pts
1	Farnham Town	32	24	4	4	88	29	+59	76
2	Chipstead	32	24	2	6	87	27	+60	74
3	Malden Town	32	22	6	4	74	33	+41	72
4	Merstham	32	19	6	7	67	41	+26	63
5	Ashford Town	32	15	9	8	57	38	+19	54
6	Farleigh Rovers	32	15	7	10	65	50	+15	52
7	Bedfont	32	15	4	13	46	44	+2	49
8	Ash United	32	13	8	11	45	43	+2	47
9	Frimley Green	32	12	5	15	53	64	−11	41
10	Cobham	32	11	6	15	46	51	−5	39
11	Westfield	32	11	5	16	60	63	−3	38
12	Steyning Town	32	10	6	16	47	56	−9	36
13	Godalming Town	32	9	7	16	35	47	−12	34
14	Hartley Wintney	32	8	5	19	29	64	−35	29
15	Cranleigh	32	7	6	19	36	69	−33	27
16	Horley Town	32	7	4	21	37	85	−48	25
17	Sandhurst Town	32	1	8	23	22	90	−68	11

Rules for classification: The system of using goal difference to separate two teams tied on points was used.
