= 1985–86 Combined Counties Football League =

The 1985–86 Combined Counties Football League season was the eighth in the history of the Combined Counties Football League, a football competition in England.

The league was won by British Aerospace (Weybridge) for the second time. Newcomers Chertsey Town finished as runners-up and were promoted back to the Isthmian League.

== League table ==
Combined Counties Football League
- Season: 1985–86
- Champions: British Aerospace (Weybridge)
- Promoted: Chertsey Town
- Matches: 342
- Goals: 1,092 (3.19 per match)

The league remained at 19 clubs after Southwick were promoted to the Isthmian League and one new club joined:

- Chertsey Town, relegated from the Isthmian League.

Pos	Team	Pld	W	D	L	GF	GA	GD	Pts	Promotion or relegation
1	British Aerospace (Weybridge)	36	26	6	4	95	36	+59	84	
2	Chertsey Town	36	26	3	7	95	32	+63	81	Promoted to the Isthmian League Division Two South
3	Ash United	36	24	6	6	76	24	+52	78	
4	Malden Vale	36	21	6	9	74	44	+30	69	
5	Farnham Town	36	21	4	11	77	42	+35	67	
6	Malden Town	36	20	6	10	72	46	+26	66	
7	Merstham	36	20	6	10	54	39	+15	66	
8	Cobham	36	19	4	13	67	59	+8	52 (Note: Cobham had nine points deducted.)	
9	Westfield	36	15	4	17	55	72	−17	52 (Note: Chobham, Cove and Westfield each had three points awarded.)	
10	Godalming Town	36	14	6	16	64	57	+7	48	
11	Hartley Wintney	36	12	7	17	51	51	0	43	
12	Chobham	36	9	11	16	36	53	−17	41	
13	Cove	36	9	9	18	41	57	−16	39	
14	Virginia Water	36	11	4	21	42	65	−23	37	
15	Farleigh Rovers	36	9	7	20	40	63	−23	34	
16	Horley Town	36	8	8	20	44	89	−45	32	
17	Cranleigh	36	9	5	22	34	85	−51	32	
18	Frimley Green	36	7	6	23	36	76	−40	27	
19	Fleet Town	36	4	8	24	39	102	−63	20	Resigned to the Surrey Premier League

Rules for classification: The system of using goal difference to separate two teams tied on points was used.
