= 1989–90 Combined Counties Football League =

The 1989–90 Combined Counties Football League season was the 12th in the history of the Combined Counties Football League, a football competition in England.

The league was won by Chipstead for the first time.

== League table ==
Combined Counties Football League
- Season: 1989–90
- Champions: Chipstead
- Promoted: Cove
- Matches: 306
- Goals: 1,010 (3.3 per match)

The league was reduced to 18 clubs from 19 after Malden Vale were promoted to the Isthmian League, and no new clubs joined:

- British Aerospace (Weybridge) changed their name to Weybridge Town.

Pos	Team	Pld	W	D	L	GF	GA	GD	Pts	Promotion or relegation
1	Chipstead	34	24	7	3	83	32	+51	79	
2	Merstham	34	24	6	4	79	28	+51	78	
3	Cove	34	21	4	9	70	43	+27	67	Promoted to the Isthmian League Division Two South
4	Ash United	34	20	7	7	67	48	+19	67	
5	Malden Town	34	19	7	8	69	42	+27	64	
6	Farnham Town	34	16	7	11	66	44	+22	55	
7	Steyning Town	34	16	4	14	45	49	−4	52	
8	Cobham	34	14	9	11	45	48	−3	51	
9	Farleigh Rovers	34	15	4	15	67	59	+8	49	
10	Godalming Town	34	14	4	16	56	58	−2	46	
11	Hartley Wintney	34	13	7	14	53	56	−3	46	
12	Weybridge Town	34	13	5	16	52	50	+2	44	Club folded
13	Frimley Green	34	9	11	14	50	55	−5	38	
14	Horley Town	34	9	6	19	47	64	−17	33	
15	Westfield	34	8	8	18	50	71	−21	32	
16	Bedfont	34	9	4	21	40	61	−21	31	
17	Cranleigh	34	6	3	25	44	96	−52	21	
18	Chobham	34	3	3	28	27	106	−79	12	Resigned to the Surrey County Premier League

Rules for classification: The system of using goal difference to separate two teams tied on points was used.
