= 1986–87 Combined Counties Football League =

The 1986–87 Combined Counties Football League season was the ninth in the history of the Combined Counties Football League, a football competition in England.

The league was won by Ash United for the second time, after they had won the Western Division in 1981–82 when the league was split into two divisions, and beaten Malden Town in a playoff.

== League table ==
Combined Counties Football League
- Season: 1986–87
- Champions: Ash United
- Matches: 306
- Goals: 1,010 (3.3 per match)

The league was reduced from 19 clubs to 18 after Chertsey Town were promoted to the Isthmian League and Fleet Town left the league. One new club joined:

- Chipstead, joining from the Surrey Premier League.

Pos	Team	Pld	W	D	L	GF	GA	GD	Pts	Promotion or relegation
1	Ash United	34	24	6	4	72	26	+46	78	
2	Farnham Town	34	23	3	8	80	37	+43	72	
3	Malden Vale	34	21	6	7	76	41	+35	69	
4	Chipstead	34	18	9	7	59	37	+22	63	
5	British Aerospace (Weybridge)	34	17	7	10	55	41	+14	58	
6	Merstham	34	17	6	11	63	37	+26	57	
7	Godalming Town	34	16	9	9	55	37	+18	57	
8	Hartley Wintney	34	16	8	10	63	43	+20	56	
9	Horley Town	34	16	8	10	50	39	+11	56	
10	Malden Town	34	14	6	14	67	53	+14	48	
11	Cobham	34	14	6	14	63	63	0	48	
12	Chobham	34	14	5	15	72	68	+4	47	
13	Cove	34	11	5	18	51	70	−19	38	
14	Farleigh Rovers	34	8	12	14	55	67	−12	36	
15	Frimley Green	34	9	4	21	48	77	−29	31	
16	Cranleigh	34	4	7	23	29	85	−56	19	
17	Westfield	34	3	6	25	29	83	−54	15	
18	Virginia Water	34	2	5	27	23	106	−83	11	Resigned to the Surrey Premier League

Rules for classification: The system of using goal difference to separate two teams tied on points was used.
