= 2008–09 Combined Counties Football League =

The 2008–09 Combined Counties Football League season was the 31st in the history of the Combined Counties Football League, a football competition in England.

== Premier Division ==
Combined Counties Football League Premier Division
- Season: 2008–09
- Champions: Bedfont Green
- Promoted: Bedfont Green
- Relegated: Hartley Wintney; Cobham
- Matches: 462
- Goals: 1,647 (3.56 per match)

The Premier Division featured three new teams in a league of 22 teams after the promotion of Merstham to the Isthmian League:

- Badshot Lea, transferred from the Hellenic League
- Hartley Wintney, promoted from Division One
- Molesey, relegated from the Isthmian League

=== League table ===
| Pos | Team | Pld | W | D | L | GF | GA | GD | Pts | Promotion or relegation |
|---|---|---|---|---|---|---|---|---|---|---|
| 1 | Bedfont Green | 42 | 29 | 9 | 4 | 116 | 55 | +61 | 96 | Promoted to the Southern League Division One South & West |
| 2 | North Greenford United | 42 | 22 | 13 | 7 | 99 | 66 | +33 | 79 | |
| 3 | Chertsey Town | 42 | 23 | 8 | 11 | 96 | 58 | +38 | 77 | |
| 4 | Epsom & Ewell | 42 | 22 | 11 | 9 | 85 | 55 | +30 | 77 | |
| 5 | Camberley Town | 42 | 21 | 12 | 9 | 99 | 56 | +43 | 75 | |
| 6 | Cove | 42 | 19 | 14 | 9 | 81 | 56 | +25 | 70 (Note: Cove were deducted one point.) | |
| 7 | Badshot Lea | 42 | 21 | 6 | 15 | 87 | 91 | −4 | 69 | |
| 8 | Raynes Park Vale | 42 | 20 | 4 | 18 | 80 | 80 | 0 | 64 | |
| 9 | Ash United | 42 | 17 | 11 | 14 | 78 | 70 | +8 | 62 | |
| 10 | Banstead Athletic | 42 | 18 | 7 | 17 | 78 | 80 | −2 | 61 | |
| 11 | Molesey | 42 | 16 | 10 | 16 | 77 | 62 | +15 | 58 | |
| 12 | Horley Town | 42 | 15 | 13 | 14 | 56 | 53 | +3 | 58 | |
| 13 | Egham Town | 42 | 16 | 8 | 18 | 62 | 66 | −4 | 56 | |
| 14 | Colliers Wood United | 42 | 15 | 8 | 19 | 81 | 73 | +8 | 53 | |
| 15 | Bookham | 42 | 14 | 10 | 18 | 75 | 85 | −10 | 52 | |
| 16 | Sandhurst Town | 42 | 14 | 9 | 19 | 63 | 82 | −19 | 51 | |
| 17 | Wembley | 42 | 12 | 10 | 20 | 61 | 81 | −20 | 46 | |
| 18 | Bedfont | 42 | 12 | 9 | 21 | 59 | 85 | −26 | 45 | |
| 19 | Chessington & Hook United | 42 | 10 | 14 | 18 | 61 | 78 | −17 | 44 | |
| 20 | Guildford City | 42 | 11 | 11 | 20 | 55 | 95 | −40 | 44 | |
| 21 | Hartley Wintney | 42 | 4 | 10 | 28 | 50 | 112 | −62 | 22 | Relegated to Division One |
| 22 | Cobham | 42 | 4 | 7 | 31 | 48 | 108 | −60 | 19 | Relegated to Division One |

Source: fchd.
Rules for classification: 1) points; 2) goal difference; 3) number of goals scored.

== Division One ==
Combined Counties Football League Division One
- Season: 2008–09
- Champions: Staines Lammas
- Promoted: Hanworth Villa; Dorking
- Matches: 306
- Goals: 1,146 (3.75 per match)

Division One featured two new teams in a league of 18 teams:

- Dorking, relegated from the Premier Division
- Mole Valley SCR, joined from the Middlesex County League

=== League table ===
| Pos | Team | Pld | W | D | L | GF | GA | GD | Pts | Promotion or relegation |
|---|---|---|---|---|---|---|---|---|---|---|
| 1 | Staines Lammas | 34 | 22 | 5 | 7 | 78 | 39 | +39 | 71 | |
| 2 | Hanworth Villa | 34 | 21 | 7 | 6 | 79 | 44 | +35 | 70 | Promoted to the Premier Division |
| 3 | Dorking | 34 | 22 | 4 | 8 | 78 | 45 | +33 | 70 | Promoted to the Premier Division |
| 4 | Mole Valley SCR | 34 | 22 | 4 | 8 | 87 | 55 | +32 | 70 | |
| 5 | Knaphill | 34 | 22 | 3 | 9 | 86 | 55 | +31 | 69 | |
| 6 | Worcester Park | 34 | 20 | 7 | 7 | 72 | 38 | +34 | 67 | |
| 7 | Feltham | 34 | 15 | 7 | 12 | 62 | 53 | +9 | 52 | |
| 8 | Farnham Town | 34 | 16 | 3 | 15 | 85 | 74 | +11 | 51 | |
| 9 | Sheerwater | 34 | 15 | 3 | 16 | 64 | 71 | −7 | 48 | |
| 10 | CB Hounslow United | 34 | 13 | 6 | 15 | 48 | 52 | −4 | 45 | |
| 11 | Warlingham | 34 | 12 | 8 | 14 | 62 | 70 | −8 | 44 | |
| 12 | Farleigh Rovers | 34 | 11 | 8 | 15 | 49 | 61 | −12 | 41 | |
| 13 | Westfield | 34 | 11 | 5 | 18 | 50 | 67 | −17 | 38 | |
| 14 | South Park | 34 | 11 | 4 | 19 | 59 | 68 | −9 | 37 | |
| 15 | Crescent Rovers | 34 | 8 | 9 | 17 | 48 | 70 | −22 | 33 | |
| 16 | Frimley Green | 34 | 10 | 3 | 21 | 40 | 74 | −34 | 33 | |
| 17 | Coulsdon United | 34 | 4 | 8 | 22 | 56 | 95 | −39 | 20 | |
| 18 | Chobham | 34 | 2 | 4 | 28 | 43 | 115 | −72 | 10 | |

Source: fchd.
Rules for classification: 1) points; 2) goal difference; 3) number of goals scored.
