= 1988–89 Combined Counties Football League =

The 1988–89 Combined Counties Football League season was the 11th in the history of the Combined Counties Football League, a football competition in England.

The league was won by British Aerospace (Weybridge) for the fourth time, and for the third time in four seasons.

== League table ==
Combined Counties Football League
- Season: 1988–89
- Champions: British Aerospace (Weybridge)
- Promoted: Malden Vale
- Matches: 342
- Goals: 1,094 (3.2 per match)

The league was increased from 18 clubs to 19 after one new club joined:

- Steyning Town, joining from the Wessex League.

Pos	Team	Pld	W	D	L	GF	GA	GD	Pts	Promotion or relegation
1	British Aerospace (Weybridge)	36	23	8	5	85	34	+51	77	
2	Malden Vale	36	20	10	6	68	32	+36	70	Promoted to the Isthmian League Division Two South
3	Merstham	36	18	12	6	71	38	+33	66	
4	Chipstead	36	18	10	8	75	40	+35	64	
5	Farnham Town	36	19	7	10	73	43	+30	64	
6	Steyning Town	36	16	12	8	69	49	+20	60	
7	Hartley Wintney	36	18	6	12	56	47	+9	60	
8	Farleigh Rovers	36	16	9	11	62	47	+15	57	
9	Horley Town	36	15	10	11	59	56	+3	55	
10	Ash United	36	14	12	10	55	52	+3	54	
11	Cobham	36	14	10	12	63	58	+5	52	
12	Bedfont	36	13	7	16	62	73	−11	46	
13	Godalming Town	36	12	9	15	55	52	+3	45	
14	Malden Town	36	13	6	17	54	67	−13	45	
15	Cranleigh	36	11	5	20	59	78	−19	38	
16	Frimley Green	36	9	6	21	37	51	−14	33 (Note: Frimley Green resigned from the league on 24 March 1989 with seven matches left to play, all of which were awarded to their opponents. They were readmitted to the league for the following season.)	
17	Cove	36	7	4	25	38	95	−57	25	
18	Chobham	36	7	4	25	27	86	−59	25	
19	Westfield	36	4	3	29	26	96	−70	15	

Rules for classification: The system of using goal difference to separate two teams tied on points was used.
