= 1993–94 Combined Counties Football League =

The 1993–94 Combined Counties Football League season was the 16th in the history of the Combined Counties Football League, a football competition in England.

The league was won by Peppard for the second time, successfully defending their championship win the previous season.

== League table ==
Combined Counties Football League
- Season: 1993–94
- Champions: Peppard
- Matches: 420
- Goals: 1,459 (3.47 per match)

The league was increased from 19 clubs to 21 after Steyning Town joined the Sussex County League, and three new clubs joined:

- Eton Wick, joining from the Chiltonian League.
- Farnham Town, rejoining from the Isthmian League after one season. They resigned before the start of the previous season due to ground grading and financial problems, but had been too late to rejoin the Combined Counties League in readiness for that season.
- Virginia Water, joining from the Surrey County Premier League. They had previously been members of the Combined Counties League, having left in 1987.

Pos	Team	Pld	W	D	L	GF	GA	GD	Pts	Promotion or relegation
1	Peppard	40	35	2	3	128	33	+95	107	
2	Ashford Town	40	31	4	5	102	37	+65	97	
3	Eton Wick	40	20	9	11	97	57	+40	69	
4	Cranleigh	40	20	9	11	89	73	+16	69	
5	Chipstead	40	19	11	10	79	54	+25	68	
6	D.C.A. Basingstoke	40	19	11	10	78	61	+17	68	
7	Ash United	40	18	9	13	84	72	+12	63	
8	Westfield	40	17	11	12	56	42	+14	62	
9	Virginia Water	40	18	7	15	74	68	+6	61	Resigned to the Surrey County Premier League
10	Sandhurst Town	40	17	9	14	65	63	+2	60	
11	Cobham	40	15	7	18	69	70	−1	52	
12	Farleigh Rovers	40	12	13	15	72	77	−5	49	Resigned to the Surrey County Premier League
13	Bedfont	40	10	16	14	47	47	0	46	
14	Godalming & Guildford	40	11	13	16	50	62	−12	46	
15	Hartley Wintney	40	12	8	20	61	90	−29	44	
16	Viking Sports	40	11	8	21	58	77	−19	41	
17	Merstham	40	9	11	20	54	90	−36	38	
18	Farnham Town	40	10	8	22	47	87	−40	38	
19	Horley Town	40	10	6	24	54	105	−51	36	
20	Ditton	40	8	9	23	55	87	−32	33	Resigned to the Surrey County Premier League
21	Frimley Green	40	3	9	28	40	107	−67	18	Resigned to the Surrey Intermediate League

Source: fchd nonleaguematters
Rules for classification: 1) points; 2) goal difference; 3) number of goals scored.
