= 1982–83 Combined Counties Football League =

The 1982–83 Combined Counties Football League season was the fifth in the history of the Combined Counties Football League, a football competition in England.

After several new clubs joined before the previous season, the league was split into two divisions – East and West. With a number of clubs leaving the league at the end of that season, it reverted to a single division. The league was won by Hartley Wintney for the first time.

== League table ==
Combined Counties Football League
- Season: 1982–83
- Champions: Hartley Wintney
- Matches: 306
- Goals: 993 (3.25 per match)

The league was reduced from 22 to 18 clubs after Clarion, Lightwater, Sheerwater and Wrecclesham all left to join the new Surrey Premier League and no new clubs joined.

| Pos | Team | Pld | W | D | L | GF | GA | GD | Pts | Promotion or relegation |
|---|---|---|---|---|---|---|---|---|---|---|
| 1 | Hartley Wintney | 34 | 23 | 6 | 5 | 71 | 29 | +42 | 75 | |
| 2 | Ash United | 34 | 23 | 5 | 6 | 77 | 42 | +35 | 74 | |
| 3 | Godalming Town | 34 | 21 | 5 | 8 | 90 | 44 | +46 | 68 | |
| 4 | Chobham | 34 | 16 | 11 | 7 | 53 | 39 | +14 | 59 | |
| 5 | Cove | 34 | 17 | 6 | 11 | 60 | 54 | +6 | 57 | |
| 6 | Chessington United | 34 | 13 | 12 | 9 | 64 | 51 | +13 | 51 | |
| 7 | British Aerospace (Weybridge) | 34 | 13 | 11 | 10 | 52 | 54 | −2 | 50 | |
| 8 | Frimley Green | 34 | 14 | 7 | 13 | 59 | 48 | +11 | 49 | |
| 9 | Cobham | 34 | 13 | 7 | 14 | 60 | 60 | 0 | 46 | |
| 10 | Malden Town | 34 | 13 | 7 | 14 | 60 | 62 | −2 | 46 | |
| 11 | Alton Town | 34 | 11 | 11 | 12 | 53 | 52 | +1 | 44 | |
| 12 | Guildford & Worplesdon | 34 | 9 | 13 | 12 | 45 | 47 | −2 | 40 | |
| 13 | Cranleigh | 34 | 10 | 8 | 16 | 51 | 63 | −12 | 38 | |
| 14 | Virginia Water | 34 | 10 | 5 | 19 | 42 | 63 | −21 | 35 | |
| 15 | Farnham Town | 34 | 8 | 11 | 15 | 41 | 65 | −24 | 35 | |
| 16 | Westfield | 34 | 8 | 10 | 16 | 43 | 50 | −7 | 34 | |
| 17 | Yateley Town | 34 | 9 | 6 | 19 | 41 | 65 | −24 | 33 | |
| 18 | Lingfield | 34 | 1 | 7 | 26 | 31 | 105 | −74 | 10 | Transferred to the Sussex County League |

Rules for classification: The system of using goal difference to separate two teams tied on points was used.
