= 2001–02 Combined Counties Football League =

The 2001–02 Combined Counties Football League season was the 24th in the history of the Combined Counties Football League, a football competition in England.

== League table ==
Combined Counties Football League
- Season: 2001–02
- Champions: AFC Wallingford
- Relegated: Cranleigh
- Matches: 462
- Goals: 1,690 (3.66 per match)

The league featured 21 clubs from the previous season, along with one new club:

- Withdean 2000, returned to the league system after resigning from the Sussex Football League in 2000

=== League table ===
Pos	Team	Pld	W	D	L	GF	GA	GD	Pts	Promotion or relegation
1	AFC Wallingford	42	33	5	4	134	39	+95	104	
2	Ash United	42	31	7	4	137	44	+93	100	
3	Chipstead	42	24	8	10	90	55	+35	80	
4	Bedfont	42	23	8	11	80	58	+22	77	
5	Withdean 2000	42	21	13	8	84	52	+32	76	
6	Hartley Wintney	42	21	9	12	109	77	+32	72	
7	Raynes Park Vale	42	18	13	11	79	56	+23	69 (Note: Raynes Park Vale were awarded two points.)	
8	Southall	42	20	8	14	97	77	+20	68	
9	Walton Casuals	42	20	7	15	88	63	+25	67	
10	Feltham	42	18	10	14	77	64	+13	64	
11	Chessington & Hook United	42	16	9	17	81	73	+8	57	
12	Westfield	42	15	12	15	69	61	+8	57	
13	Sandhurst Town	42	16	6	20	73	74	−1	54	
14	Farnham Town	42	15	6	21	54	75	−21	51	
15	Cove	42	15	6	21	72	86	−14	49 (Note: Cove were deducted two points.)	
16	Chessington United	42	13	8	21	60	79	−19	47	
17	Godalming & Guildford	42	12	9	21	57	88	−31	45	
18	Cobham	42	12	7	23	62	76	−14	43	
19	Viking Greenford	42	11	7	24	55	106	−51	38 (Note: Viking Greenford were deducted two points.)	
20	Merstham	42	9	8	25	59	106	−47	35	
21	Reading Town	42	8	5	29	47	115	−68	29	
22	Cranleigh	42	4	3	35	26	166	−140	15	Relegated to the Surrey County Senior League

Source: fchd.info
Rules for classification: 1) points; 2) goal difference; 3) number of goals scored.
