= 1979–80 Combined Counties Football League =

The 1979–80 Combined Counties Football League season was the second in the history of the Combined Counties Football League, a football competition in England. This was the first season in which the "Combined Counties League" name was used after the inaugural season was held under the name of the "Home Counties League".

The league was won by Guildford & Worplesdon for the first time.

== League table ==
Combined Counties Football League
- Season: 1979–80
- Champions: Guildford & Worplesdon
- Matches: 210
- Goals: 831 (3.96 per match)

The league was expanded from 13 to 15 clubs as two new clubs joined:

- Godalming & Farncombe United
- Virginia Water, joining from the London Spartan League Senior Division

Pos	Team	Pld	W	D	L	GF	GA	GD	Pts
1	Guildford & Worplesdon	28	23	5	0	85	18	+67	51
2	Ash United	28	21	3	4	107	28	+79	45
3	Malden Town	28	19	4	5	64	37	+27	42
4	British Aerospace (Weybridge)	28	16	9	3	74	34	+40	41
5	Chessington United	28	17	1	10	70	38	+32	35
6	Westfield	28	13	8	7	66	40	+26	34
7	Cobham	28	12	7	9	48	47	+1	31
8	Lion Sports	28	11	3	14	55	45	+10	25
9	Godalming & Farncombe United	28	9	7	12	42	44	−2	25
10	Hartley Wintney	28	10	5	13	48	55	−7	25
11	Lightwater	28	9	5	14	44	61	−17	23
12	Sheerwater	28	6	5	17	34	72	−38	17
13	Yateley Town	28	4	1	23	35	109	−74	11 (Note: Yateley Town had two points awarded.)
14	Virginia Water	28	3	3	22	28	88	−60	9
15	Clarion	28	3	2	23	31	115	−84	6 (Note: Clarion had two points deducted.)

Rules for classification: The system of using goal difference to separate two teams tied on points was used.
