= Southern Combination Challenge Cup =

- Founded: 1958
- Region: England
- Teams: 18 (2016–17)
- Current champions: Farnham Town
- Most championships: Hampton & Richmond Borough (8 wins)

The Southern Combination Challenge Cup is a football competition contested by non-league clubs. An independent cup, it was directly affiliated to the Football Association until 2015, when a change in FA Rules required such competitions to affiliate with the county of the majority of its member clubs: this is currently the Surrey County FA for this competition. The competition was founded in March 1958, as the Southern Combination Amateur Challenge Cup Competition. The word "Amateur" was later dropped in 1974. It is often referred to as simply the Southern Combination Cup.

The competition's rules state that entrants must be based within 25 miles of Weybridge, Surrey (until 1998, within 25 miles of Kingston upon Thames). At least two other competitions with similar names existed, in different areas of south east England:

(1) the Southern Counties Combination Football League started in 1971 as a league competition in Sussex (and later southern parts of Surrey), with an associated League Cup and, a few years later, a Midweek Floodlight [Cup] Competition. This competition closed down in 2002, with the last winners being Fleet Town - a club from Hampshire who, incidentally, have also entered the Southern Combination Challenge Cup.

(2) the Southern Combination Cup, which started around 1980, and offered a set of the sponsors', Phillips', floodlights to the inaugural winners. In some years, a Reserve Section was also contested. Known entrants were from the Hertfordshire and Bedfordshire area, but the competition ceased following Stotfold's victory in 1996.

Hampton & Richmond Borough are the most successful club in the competition's history, having lifted the cup eight times. With seven of those coming under the name of Hampton, their most recent success came during the 2004–05 season. There have been 24 different winners, with Farnham Town FC the current holders after beating Balham 3-2 aet in May 2023 in front of 1,143 fans.

== History ==
Until the 1994–95 season, the competition would comprise a maximum 16 teams starting in the First Round. If extra clubs were competing that year, a Preliminary Round would be added. However, this figure rose to 20 teams ahead of the 1998-99 campaign and the AGM agreed to start the competition in the Second Round, should 16 teams be included. They believed the suffix of Preliminary Round added to the difficulty of selling fixtures to the paying public. The final Preliminary Round fixture came during the 1994–95 season, with Epsom & Ewell recording a 6–0 victory over Walton & Hersham in a replay.

Penalties were introduced into the competition in 1979, but only if both clubs agreed and liaised with the match officials beforehand. They were made compulsory in 1995, should any game be drawn following extra time. In recent years, the competition has typically been dominated by teams in the ninth and tenth tiers of the English football league system, although other non-league teams, such as Staines Town and Leatherhead, have also used the competition as a Reserve team event. The Combined Counties Football League has labelled the competition "a supplementary Combined Counties League Cup".

== Finals ==
Season-by-season list of winners and runners-up.

=== Key ===
| Match went to a replay |
| Match went to extra time |
| Match decided by a penalty shootout after extra time |
| Shared trophy |

| Season | Winners | Result | Runner-up | Venue | Notes |
|---|---|---|---|---|---|
| 1958–59 | Slough Town | 3-2 | Carshalton Athletic | Godolphin Stadium | After extra time. |
| 1959–60 | Carshalton Athletic | 4-2 | Slough Town | Godolphin Stadium | |
| 1960–61 | Windsor & Eton | 5-4 | Cray Wanderers | Stag Meadow | After extra time. |
| 1961–62 | Wokingham Town | 2-1 | Windsor & Eton | Wokingham Town | Finchampstead Road |
| 1962–63 | Slough Town | 3-0 | Wokingham Town | Godolphin Stadium | |
| 1963–64 | Slough Town | 1-0 | Molesey | Godolphin Stadium | |
| 1964–65 | Staines Town | 3-1 | Wingate | Hall Lane | Replay. First match abandoned at 1–1 after 37 minutes. |
| 1965–66 | Metropolitan Police | 3-1 | British Aircraft Corporation (Weybridge) | Liberty Lane | After extra time. |
| 1966–67 | Staines Town | 3-1 | Marlow | The A.D. Memorial Ground | |
| 1967–68 | Metropolitan Police | 6-3 | Staines Town | Wheatsheaf Lane | |
| 1968–69 | Hampton | 4-3 | Aldershot Services | Hampton | |
| 1969–70 | Metropolitan Police | 2-0 | Banstead Athletic | Banstead Athletic | |
| 1970–71 | Metropolitan Police | 1-0 | Marlow | Marlow | |
| 1971–72 | Hampton | 2-0 | Staines Town | Queen Elizabeth II Field | |
| 1972–73 | Tooting & Mitcham United | 1-0 | Hampton | Fetcham Grove | |
| 1973–74 | Dulwich Hamlet | 3-1 | Egham Town | Champion Hill | |
| 1974–75 | Addlestone | 2-0 | Woking | Liberty Lane | |
| 1975–76 | Addlestone | 2-1 | Egham Town | Runnymede Stadium | |
| 1976–77 | Hampton | 3-1 | Farnborough Town | Beveree Stadium | |
| 1977–78 | Egham Town | 4-0 | Hampton | Runnymede Stadium | |
| 1978–79 | Malden Vale | 2-1 | Camberley Town | Larges Lane | |
| 1979–80 | Epsom & Ewell | 7-2 | Hampton | Beveree Stadium | |
| 1980–81 | Camberley Town | 1-0 | Wokingham Town | Watchetts Park | After extra time. |
| 1981–82 | Hampton | 3-1 | Maidenhead United | York Road | |
| 1982–83 | Walton & Hersham | 1-1 | Epsom & Ewell | Stompond Lane | After extra time. Walton & Hersham win 5–4 on penalties. |
| 1983–84 | Hampton | 1-0 | Egham Town | Beveree Stadium | |
| 1984–85 | Bracknell Town | 3-2 | Wokingham Town | Larges Lane | After extra time. |
| 1985–86 | Hampton | 3-0 | Camberley Town | Beveree Stadium | |
| 1986–87 | Feltham | 3-0 | Bracknell Town | Larges Lane | |
| 1987–88 | Feltham | 2-1 | Camberley Town | Pavilion Ground | |
| 1988–89 | Walton & Hersham | 3-0 | Chertsey Town | Stompond Lane | |
| 1989–90 | Leatherhead | 2-0 | Malden Vale | Grove Park | |
| 1990–91 | Molesey | 3-2 | Feltham | Walton Road | |
| 1991–92 | Walton & Hersham | 1-0 | Malden Vale | Stompond Lane | After extra time. |
| 1992–93 | Dorking | 1-0 | Epsom & Ewell | Westhumble Playing Fields | |
| 1993–94 | Molesey | 1-0 | Staines Town | Walton Road | |
| 1994–95 | Staines Town | | Chertsey Town | | Walkover. Awarded by decision of EGM at Chertsey Town. |
| 1995–96 | Ashford Town (Middlesex) | 3-0 | Feltham | Feltham Sports & Social Club | |
| 1996–97 | Hampton | 2-1 | Staines Town | Wheatsheaf Lane | After extra time. |
| 1997–98 | Godalming & Guildford | 3-0 | Hampton | Beveree Stadium | |
| 1998–99 | Chertsey Town | 4-2 | Walton & Hersham | Alwyns Lane | |
| 1999–00 | Walton & Hersham | | Staines Town | | Walkover. Match conceded by Staines Town. |
| 2000–01 | Walton & Hersham | 3-1 | Chipstead | Chipstead Lane | |
| 2001–02 | Chessington & Hook United | 5-3 | Ashford Town (Middlesex) | Church Lane | |
| 2002–03 | Sandhurst Town | 2-1 | Walton & Hersham | Yorktown Road | |
| 2003–04 | Bedfont | 2-1 | Chipstead | Recreation Ground (Hatton) | |
| 2004–05 | Hampton & Richmond Borough; Walton & Hersham | | | | Cup was shared as the final was not played. |
| 2005–06 | Staines Town | 3-2 | Molesey | Walton Road | After extra time. |
| 2006–07 | Merstham; Staines Lammas | | | | Cup was shared as the final was not played. |
| 2007–08 | Chipstead | 1-0 | Ashford Town (Middlesex) | Chipstead Lane | |
| 2008–09 | Cove | 4-1 | Chessington & Hook United | Oak Farm Playing Fields | |
| 2009–10 | Reading Town | 4-1 | Hanworth Villa | Scours Lane | |
| 2010–11 | Ashford Town (Middlesex) | 1-0 | Hanworth Villa | Robert Parker Stadium | |
| 2011–12 | Hanworth Villa | 5-0 | Sandhurst Town | Rectory Meadow | |
| 2012–13 | Molesey | 1-1 | Spelthorne Sports | The Meadow | After extra time. Molesey win 5–4 on penalties. |
| 2013–14 | Hanworth Villa | 1-0 | Spelthorne Sports | Old Ham Lane | |
| 2014–15 | Molesey | 3-0 | Bedfont & Feltham | The Meadow | |
| 2015–16 | Molesey | 6-1 | Dorking | The Meadow | |
| 2016–17 | Sutton Common Rovers | 4-1 | Camberley Town | Gander Green Lane | |
| 2018-19 | Walton Casuals | 4-2 | Sutton Common Rovers | Gander Green Lane | After Extra Time |
| 2019-20 | Competition abandoned due to COVID-19 pandemic. | | | | |
| 2020-21 | Competition not held due to COVID-19 pandemic. | | | | |
| 2021-22 | Ashford Town (Middlesex) | 3-2 | Fleet Town | Calthorpe Park | |
| 2022–23 | Farnham Town | 3-2 | Balham | Calthorpe Park | |

== Results by team ==
A list of all clubs to have reached the Final of the competition since formation.

| Club | Winners | Runners-up | Winning years | Runners-up years |
|---|---|---|---|---|
| Hampton & Richmond Borough previously known as Hampton in years marked * | 7½ | 4½ | 1968-69*, 1971–72*, 1976–77*, 1981–82*, 1983–84*, 1985–86*, 1996–97*, 2004-05† | 1972-73*, 1977–78*, 1979–80*, 1997–98* |
| Walton & Hersham | 5½ | 2½ | 1982-83, 1988–89, 1991–92, 1999–00, 2000–01, 2004-05† | 1998-99, 2002–03 |
| Molesey | 5 | 2 | 1990-91, 1993–94, 2012–13, 2014–15, 2015–16 | 1963-64, 2005–06 |
| Staines Town | 4 | 5 | 1964-65, 1966–67, 1994–95, 2005–06 | 1967-68, 1971–72, 1993–94, 1996–97, 1999–00 |
| Metropolitan Police | 4 | 0 | 1965-66, 1967–68, 1969–70, 1970–71 | |
| Ashford Town (Middlesex) | 3 | 2 | 1995-96, 2010–11, 2021–22 | 2001-02, 2007–08 |
| Slough Town | 3 | 1 | 1958-59, 1962–63, 1963–64 | 1959-60 |
| Feltham | 2 | 2 | 1986-87, 1987–88 | 1990-91, 1995–96 |
| Hanworth Villa | 2 | 2 | 2011-12, 2013–14 | 2009-10, 2010–11 |
| Addlestone | 2 | 0 | 1974-75, 1975–76 | |
| Camberley Town | 1 | 4 | 1980-81 | 1978-79, 1985–86, 1987–88, 2016–17 |
| Egham Town | 1 | 3 | 1977-78 | 1973-74, 1975–76, 1983–84 |
| Wokingham Town | 1 | 3 | 1961-62 | 1962-63, 1980–81, 1984–85 |
| Chertsey Town | 1 | 2 | 1998-99 | 1988-89, 1994–95 |
| Chipstead | 1 | 2 | 2007-08 | 2000-01, 2003–04 |
| Epsom & Ewell | 1 | 2 | 1979-80 | 1982-83, 1992–93 |
| Malden Vale | 1 | 2 | 1978-79 | 1989-90, 1991–92 |
| Bracknell Town | 1 | 1 | 1984-85 | 1986-87 |
| Carshalton Athletic | 1 | 1 | 1959-60 | 1958-59 |
| Chessington & Hook United | 1 | 1 | 2001-02 | 2008-09 |
| Dorking | 1 | 1 | 1992-93 | 2015-16 |
| Sandhurst Town | 1 | 1 | 2002-03 | 2011-12 |
| Windsor & Eton | 1 | 1 | 1960-61 | 1961-62 |
| Farnham Town | 1 | 0 | 2022-23 | |
| Bedfont | 1 | 0 | 2003-04 | |
| Cove | 1 | 0 | 2008-09 | |
| Dulwich Hamlet | 1 | 0 | 1973-74 | |
| Godalming & Guildford | 1 | 0 | 1997-98 | |
| Leatherhead | 1 | 0 | 1989-90 | |
| Reading Town | 1 | 0 | 2009-10 | |
| Sutton Common Rovers | 1 | 0 | 2016-17 | |
| Tooting & Mitcham United | 1 | 0 | 1972-73 | |
| Merstham | ½ | ½ | 2006-07† | |
| Staines Lammas | ½ | ½ | 2006-07† | |
| Marlow | 0 | 2 | | 1966-67, 1970–71 |
| Spelthorne Sports | 0 | 2 | | 2012-13, 2013–14 |
| Aldershot Services | 0 | 1 | | 2012-13, 2013–14 |
| B.A.C. (Weybridge) | 0 | 1 | | 1965-66 |
| Banstead Athletic | 0 | 1 | | 1969-70 |
| Bedfont & Feltham | 0 | 1 | | 2014-15 |
| Cray Wanderers | 0 | 1 | | 1960-61 |
| Farnborough Town | 0 | 1 | | 1976-77 |
| Maidenhead United | 0 | 1 | | 1981-82 |
| Wingate | 0 | 1 | | 1964-65 |
| Woking | 0 | 1 | | 1974-75 |

† denotes that in this year the final was unplayed and the cup was shared between the two clubs who qualified for it. These instances are counted as ½ in the "Winners" and "Runners-Up" columns, with the year recorded in the "Winning Years" column.

== See also ==
- Combined Counties Football League
