= 1978–79 Home Counties League =

The 1978–79 Home Counties League season was the first in the history of the Combined Counties Football League, a football competition in England. This was the only season in which the "Home Counties League" name was used before the league was renamed as the Combined Counties League.

There was one division of thirteen clubs, won by British Aerospace (Weybridge).

== Constitution and league table ==
Combined Counties Football League
- Season: 1978–79
- Champions: British Aerospace (Weybridge)
- Matches: 156
- Goals: 499 (3.2 per match)

The league consisted of thirteen clubs, nine of which came from the Surrey Senior League:

- Ash United
- British Aerospace (Weybridge)
- Chessington United
- Clarion
- Cobham
- Lion Sports
- Malden Town
- Sheerwater
- Westfield

Four other teams also joined the league:

- Guildford & Worplesdon
- Hartley Wintney
- Lightwater
- Yateley Town

=== League table ===
Pos	Team	Pld	W	D	L	GF	GA	GD	Pts
1	British Aerospace (Weybridge)	24	21	2	1	81	16	+65	44
2	Ash United	24	18	4	2	74	23	+51	40
3	Malden Town	24	15	4	5	49	19	+30	34
4	Lightwater	24	12	5	7	42	43	−1	29
5	Chessington United	24	10	8	6	33	13	+20	28
6	Guildford & Worplesdon	24	10	6	8	28	27	+1	26
7	Westfield	24	8	8	8	27	31	−4	24
8	Hartley Wintney	24	9	4	11	35	47	−12	22
9	Yateley Town	24	5	7	12	31	53	−22	17
10	Cobham	24	4	8	12	25	52	−27	16
11	Lion Sports	24	4	6	14	29	54	−25	14
12	Sheerwater	24	2	6	16	22	58	−36	10
13	Clarion	24	2	4	18	23	63	−40	8

Source: There was no promotion or relegation.
Rules for classification: The system of using goal difference to separate two teams tied on points was used.
