= 1990–91 Isthmian League =

The 1990–91 season was the 76th season of the Isthmian League, an English football competition featuring semi-professional and amateur clubs from London, East and South East England.

The league consisted of three divisions. The Second Division was divided into two sections. At the end of the season, Division Two North and Division Two South were merged into a single Division Two, and Division Three was formed.

== Premier Division ==
Isthmian League Premier Division
- Season: 1990–91
- Champions: Redbridge Forest
- Promoted: Redbridge Forest
- Relegated: Barking; Leyton-Wingate
- Matches: 462
- Goals: 1,383 (2.99 per match)
- Highest attendance: 2,507 – Kingstonian – Woking, (3 November)
- Total attendance: 208,471
- Average attendance: 451 (+14.5% to previous season)

The Premier Division consisted of 22 clubs, including 19 clubs from the previous season and three new clubs:

- Enfield, relegated from the Football Conference
- Wivenhoe Town, promoted as champions of Division One
- Woking, promoted as runners-up in Division One

=== League table ===
Pos	Team	Pld	W	D	L	GF	GA	GD	Pts	Promotion or relegation
1	Redbridge Forest	42	29	6	7	74	43	+31	93	Promoted to the Football Conference
2	Enfield	42	26	11	5	83	30	+53	89	
3	Aylesbury United	42	24	11	7	90	47	+43	83	
4	Woking	42	24	10	8	84	39	+45	82	
5	Kingstonian	42	21	12	9	86	57	+29	75	
6	Grays Athletic	42	20	8	14	66	53	+13	68	
7	Marlow	42	18	13	11	72	49	+23	67	
8	Hayes	42	20	5	17	60	57	+3	65	
9	Carshalton Athletic	42	19	7	16	80	67	+13	64	
10	Wivenhoe Town	42	16	11	15	69	66	+3	59	
11	Wokingham Town	42	15	13	14	58	54	+4	58	
12	Windsor & Eton	42	15	10	17	48	63	−15	55	
13	Bishop's Stortford	42	14	12	16	54	49	+5	54	
14	Dagenham	42	13	11	18	62	68	−6	50	
15	Hendon	42	12	10	20	48	62	−14	46	
16	St Albans City	42	11	12	19	60	74	−14	45	
17	Bognor Regis Town	42	12	8	22	44	71	−27	44	
18	Basingstoke Town	42	12	7	23	57	95	−38	43	
19	Staines Town	42	10	10	22	46	79	−33	39 (Note: Staines Town were deducted one point.)	
20	Harrow Borough	42	10	8	24	57	84	−27	38	
21	Barking	42	8	10	24	41	85	−44	34	Relegated to Division One
22	Leyton-Wingate	42	7	7	28	44	91	−47	28	Relegated to Division One

Source: fchd.com rsssf.com
Rules for classification: 1) points; 2) goal difference; 3) number of goals scored.

=== Stadia and locations ===
Locations of the Premier Division clubs
Greater London Premier Division football clubs

Club	Stadium
Aylesbury United	Buckingham Road
Barking	Mayesbrook Park
Basingstoke Town	The Camrose
Bishop's Stortford	Woodside Park
Bognor Regis Town	Nyewood Lane
Carshalton Athletic	War Memorial Sports Ground
Dagenham	Victoria Road
Enfield	Southbury Road
Grays Athletic	New Recreation Ground
Hayes	Church Road
Harrow Borough	Earlsmead Stadium
Hendon	Claremont Road
Kingstonian	Kingsmeadow
Leyton-Wingate	Wadham Lodge
Marlow	Alfred Davis Memorial Ground
Redbridge Forest	Victoria Road
St Albans City	Clarence Park
Staines Town	Wheatsheaf Park
Windsor & Eton	Stag Meadow
Wivenhoe Town	Broad Lane
Woking	The Laithwaite Community Stadium
Wokingham Town	Cantley Park

== Division One ==
Isthmian League Division One
- Season: 1990–91
- Champions: Chesham United
- Promoted: Bromley; Chesham United
- Relegated: Lewes; Metropolitan Police; Southwick; Worthing
- Matches: 462
- Goals: 1,362 (2.95 per match)
- Highest attendance: 802 – Chesham United – Bromley, (23 March)
- Total attendance: 86,996
- Average attendance: 188 (-13.4% to previous season)

Division One consisted of 22 clubs, including 16 clubs from the previous season and six new clubs:

Two clubs relegated from the Premier Division:

- Bromley
- Dulwich Hamlet

Two clubs promoted from Division Two North:

- Aveley
- Heybridge Swifts

Two clubs promoted from Division Two South:

- Molesey
- Yeading

=== League table ===
Pos	Team	Pld	W	D	L	GF	GA	GD	Pts	Promotion or relegation
1	Chesham United	42	27	8	7	102	37	+65	89	Promoted to the Premier Division
2	Bromley	42	22	14	6	62	37	+25	80	Promoted to the Premier Division
3	Yeading	42	23	8	11	75	45	+30	77	
4	Aveley	42	21	9	12	76	43	+33	72	
5	Hitchin Town	42	21	9	12	78	50	+28	72	
6	Tooting & Mitcham United	42	20	12	10	71	48	+23	72	
7	Walton & Hersham	42	21	8	13	73	48	+25	71	
8	Molesey	42	22	5	15	65	46	+19	71	
9	Whyteleafe	42	21	6	15	62	53	+9	69	
10	Dorking	42	20	5	17	78	67	+11	65	
11	Chalfont St Peter	42	19	5	18	56	63	−7	62	
12	Dulwich Hamlet	42	16	11	15	67	54	+13	59	
13	Harlow Town	42	17	8	17	73	64	+9	59	
14	Boreham Wood	42	15	8	19	46	53	−7	53	
15	Wembley	42	13	12	17	62	59	+3	51	
16	Uxbridge	42	15	5	22	45	61	−16	50	
17	Croydon	42	15	5	22	44	85	−41	50	
18	Heybridge Swifts	42	13	10	19	46	59	−13	49	
19	Southwick	42	13	8	21	49	75	−26	47	Relegated to Division Two
20	Lewes	42	10	8	24	49	82	−33	38	Relegated to Division Two
21	Metropolitan Police	42	9	6	27	55	76	−21	33	Relegated to Division Two
22	Worthing	42	2	4	36	28	157	−129	10	Relegated to Division Two

Source: fchd.com rsssf.com
Rules for classification: 1) points; 2) goal difference; 3) number of goals scored.

=== Stadia and locations ===
Locations of the Division One clubs
Greater London Division One football clubs

Club	Stadium
Aveley	The Mill Field
Boreham Wood	Meadow Park
Bromley	Hayes Lane
Chalfont St Peter	Mill Meadow
Chesham United	The Meadow
Croydon	Croydon Sports Arena
Dorking	Meadowbank Stadium
Dulwich Hamlet	Champion Hill
Harlow Town	Harlow Sportcentre
Heybridge Swifts	Scraley Road
Hitchin Town	Top Field
Lewes	The Dripping Pan
Metropolitan Police	Imber Court
Molesey	Walton Road Stadium
Southwick	Old Barn Way
Tooting & Mitcham United	Imperial Fields
Uxbridge	Honeycroft
Walton & Hersham	The Sports Ground
Wembley	Vale Farm
Whyteleafe	Church Road
Worthing	Woodside Road
Yeading	The Warren

== Division Two North ==
Isthmian League Division Two North
- Season: 1990–91
- Champions: Stevenage Borough
- Promoted: Stevenage Borough; Vauxhall Motors
- Matches: 462
- Goals: 1,467 (3.18 per match)
- Highest attendance: 793 – Stevenage Borough – Ware, (15 April)
- Total attendance: 58,646
- Average attendance: 127 (-3.8% to previous season)

Division Two North consisted of 22 clubs, including 19 clubs from the previous season and three new clubs:

- Kingsbury Town, relegated from Division One
- Purfleet, relegated from Division One
- Edgware Town, joined from the Spartan League

At the end of the season Division Two North and Division Two South were merged into single Division Two and also Division Three was formed. Finchley merged with Wingate to form Wingate & Finchley who took Wingate's place in the South Midlands League Premier Division, while Basildon United resigned to the Essex Senior League.

=== League table ===
Pos	Team	Pld	W	D	L	GF	GA	GD	Pts	Promotion or relegation
1	Stevenage Borough	42	34	5	3	122	29	+93	107	Promoted to Division One
2	Vauxhall Motors	42	24	10	8	82	50	+32	82	Promoted to Division One
3	Billericay Town	42	22	8	12	70	41	+29	74	
4	Ware	42	22	8	12	78	51	+27	74	
5	Berkhamsted Town	42	19	11	12	60	51	+9	68	
6	Witham Town	42	19	10	13	70	59	+11	67	
7	Purfleet	42	17	14	11	68	57	+11	65	
8	Rainham Town	42	19	7	16	57	46	+11	64	
9	Hemel Hempstead	42	16	14	12	62	56	+6	62	
10	Barton Rovers	42	17	10	15	61	58	+3	61	
11	Saffron Walden Town	42	16	13	13	72	77	−5	61	
12	Collier Row	42	16	11	15	63	63	0	59	Relegated to Division Three
13	Kingsbury Town	42	17	8	17	64	72	−8	59	Relegated to Division Three
14	Edgware Town	42	17	7	18	73	65	+8	58	Relegated to Division Three
15	Hertford Town	42	16	10	16	69	70	−1	58	Relegated to Division Three
16	Royston Town	42	14	15	13	78	62	+16	57	Relegated to Division Three
17	Tilbury	42	14	6	22	70	79	−9	48	Relegated to Division Three
18	Basildon United	42	11	10	21	61	90	−29	43	Resigned to the Essex Senior League
19	Hornchurch	42	10	9	23	53	87	−34	39	Relegated to Division Three
20	Clapton	42	9	10	23	54	93	−39	34 (Note: Clapton were deducted three points.)	Relegated to Division Three
21	Finchley	42	6	7	29	50	112	−62	25	Merged into Wingate to form Wingate & Finchley in South Midlands League
22	Tring Town	42	1	9	32	30	99	−69	12	Relegated to Division Three

Source: fchd.com rsssf.com
Rules for classification: 1) points; 2) goal difference; 3) number of goals scored.

=== Stadia and locations ===
Locations of the Division Two North clubs
Greater London Division Two North football clubs

Club	Stadium
Barton Rovers	Sharpenhoe Road
Basildon United	Gardiners Close
Berkhamsted Town	Broadwater
Billericay Town	New Lodge
Clapton	The Old Spotted Dog Ground
Collier Row	Sungate
Edgware Town	White Lion
Finchley	Summers Lane
Hemel Hempstead	Vauxhall Road
Hertford Town	Hertingfordbury Park
Hornchurch	Hornchurch Stadium
Kingsbury Town	Avenue Park
Purfleet	Ship Lane
Rainham Town	Deri Park
Royston Town	Garden Walk
Saffron Walden Town	Catons Lane
Stevenage Borough	The Lamex Stadium
Tilbury	Chadfields
Tring Town	Pendley Ground
Vauxhall Motors	Brache Estate
Ware	Wodson Park
Witham Town	Spa Road

== Division Two South ==
Isthmian League Division Two South
- Season: 1990–91
- Champions: Abingdon Town
- Promoted: Abingdon Town; Maidenhead United
- Matches: 462
- Goals: 1,477 (3.2 per match)
- Highest attendance: 456 – Abingdon Town – Maidenhead United, (6 April)
- Total attendance: 52,052
- Average attendance: 113 (+8.7% to previous season)

Division Two South consisted of 22 clubs, including 19 clubs from the previous season and three new clubs:

- Cove, joined from the Combined Counties League
- Hampton, relegated from Division One
- Leatherhead, relegated from Division One

At the end of the season Division Two North and Division Two South were merged into single Division Two and also Division Three was formed.

Before the next season started Feltham merged with the Hellenic League side Hounslow F.C. to create Feltham & Hounslow Borough F.C.

=== League table ===
Pos	Team	Pld	W	D	L	GF	GA	GD	Pts	Promotion or relegation
1	Abingdon Town	42	29	7	6	95	28	+67	94	Promoted to Division One
2	Maidenhead United	42	28	8	6	85	33	+52	92	Promoted to Division One
3	Egham Town	42	27	6	9	100	46	+54	87	
4	Malden Vale	42	26	5	11	72	44	+28	83	
5	Ruislip Manor	42	25	5	12	93	44	+49	80	
6	Southall	42	23	10	9	84	43	+41	79	
7	Harefield United	42	23	10	9	81	56	+25	79	
8	Newbury Town	42	23	8	11	71	45	+26	77	
9	Hungerford Town	42	16	13	13	84	69	+15	61	
10	Leatherhead	42	17	9	16	82	55	+27	60	
11	Banstead Athletic	42	15	13	14	58	62	−4	58	
12	Hampton	42	14	15	13	62	43	+19	57	Relegated to Division Three
13	Epsom & Ewell	42	15	12	15	49	50	−1	57	Relegated to Division Three
14	Chertsey Town	42	15	9	18	76	72	+4	54	Relegated to Division Three
15	Horsham	42	14	7	21	58	67	−9	49	Relegated to Division Three
16	Flackwell Heath	42	11	11	20	56	78	−22	44	Relegated to Division Three
17	Bracknell Town	42	11	7	24	60	97	−37	40	Relegated to Division Three
18	Feltham	42	10	8	24	45	80	−35	38	Relegated to Division Three and Merged with Hounslow (Hellenic League) to create Feltham & Hounslow Borough
19	Cove	42	10	7	25	51	94	−43	37	Relegated to Division Three
20	Eastbourne United	42	10	7	25	53	109	−56	37	Relegated to Division Three
21	Petersfield United	42	6	3	33	35	119	−84	21	Relegated to Division Three
22	Camberley Town	42	1	6	35	27	143	−116	9	Relegated to Division Three

Source: fchd.com rsssf.com
Rules for classification: 1) points; 2) goal difference; 3) number of goals scored.

=== Stadia and locations ===
Locations of the Division Two South clubs
Greater London Division Two South football clubs

Club	Stadium
Abingdon Town	Culham Road
Banstead Athletic	Merland Rise
Bracknell Town	Larges Lane
Camberley Town	Kroomer Park
Chertsey Town	Alwyns Lane
Cove	Oak Farm
Eastbourne United	The Oval
Egham Town	The Runnymede Stadium
Epsom & Ewell	Merland Rise (groundshare with Banstead Athletic)
Feltham	The Orchard
Flackwell Heath	Wilks Park
Hampton	Beveree Stadium
Harefield United	Preston Park
Horsham	Queen Street
Hungerford Town	Bulpit Lane
Leatherhead	Fetcham Grove
Maidenhead United	York Road
Malden Vale	Prince George's Playing Fields
Newbury Town	Town Ground
Petersfield United	The Southdowns Builders Stadium
Ruislip Manor	Grosvenor Vale
Southall	Robert Parker Stadium

== See also ==
- Isthmian League
- 1990–91 Northern Premier League
- 1990–91 Southern Football League
