= Combined Counties Football League =

Ninth and tenth levels of English league football

- Founded: 1922
- Country: England
- Divisions: 3 (plus 3 reserve and development divisions)
- Number of clubs: 64 (plus 43 others, including reserve and development teams)
- Level on pyramid: Levels 9–10
- Feeder to: Southern League; Isthmian League
- Promotion to: Level 8 Southern League Division One Central; Isthmian League Division One South Central or South East
- Relegation to: Middlesex County League; Surrey Premier County Football League; Hampshire Premier League; Thames Valley Premier Football League
- Domestic cup(s): Premier Challenge Cup; Division One Challenge Cup; Development Cup; Youth Cup; Grant McLellan Youth Cup; Division Two Cup; Women's Challenge Cup
- Current champions: Ashford Town (Middlesex) (Premier Division North); Cobham (Premier Division South); Penn & Tylers Green (Division One) (2026–27)
- Website: Official website
- Current: 2026–27 season

The Combined Counties Football League is a regional men's football league in south-eastern England with members in Berkshire, Buckinghamshire, Hampshire, Hertfordshire, Kent, Middlesex, Oxfordshire, Surrey, and the western half of Greater London, featuring a number of semi-professional clubs. It is sponsored by Cherry Red Records and is officially known as the Cherry Red Records Combined Counties Football League.

It was founded in 1922 as the Surrey Senior League and was renamed in 1978 to the Combined Counties League. Initially, the league was a single division, but it consists now of 63 teams in three divisions: Premier Division North, Premier Division South and Division One. The league also has a new Division Two of nine teams, many being reserve and development teams, six teams competing in an Under-23 Development Division, known as the John Bennett Development Division, and 20 Under-18 teams split across North and South divisions, known as the Tony Ford Under-18 Youth Divisions. These four divisions are outside the National League System.

The Premier Divisions North and South are two of sixteen recognised leagues to form the ninth level of the English football league system (known as Step 5 of the National League System), and Division One is one of seventeen recognised leagues at level 10 (known as Step 6 of the National League System). The Combined Counties Football League is a feeder to the Isthmian League and the Southern League.

== History ==
The league was renamed on 18 June 1978 when the Surrey Senior League underwent a metamorphosis to try to attract clubs from outside the county. The expanded league was initially called the Home Counties League but there was an objection to the title from the Home Counties Conference, which forced the league to change its name.

The league had a verbal agreement with the Surrey County Football Association to revert to a similar title to the former league – the Surrey Senior Football League. However, this name was later rejected as the Surrey County Football Association intended to reform the Surrey Senior League at a later date. It was first suggested by the FA that the league should be called the Corinthian Football League, but this was frowned upon by the Athenian Football League within which the old Corinthian Football League had been incorporated. The alternative suggestion, the Combined Counties Football League, was approved for the 1979–80 season.

With increasing numbers for the 1981–82 season, the clubs were split into two equal divisions: the Eastern Division and the Western Division. The winners then met in a two-legged play-off final, with Ash United winning 3–0 in aggregate against Malden Town. The league reverted to a single division for the 1982–83 season.

The league began with nine founder-member clubs and continued to steadily grow, resulting in the league becoming a feeder to the Isthmian League in 1984 with 16–18 teams usually competing in the Combined Counties Football League. Southwick became the first team promoted to the Isthmian League from a feeder club in 1985, and Chertsey Town followed a year later.

In 1987, the league announced a four-year sponsorship agreement with Dan-Air worth a five figure sum. As part of the agreement, the league became known as the Dan-Air Football League and a representative team was introduced. The Dan-Air Class Elite Cup was also launched in 1989.

The Dan-Air Youth League was formed for the 1991–92 season and opened to youth teams from all member clubs. However, the league attracted just seven clubs for the inaugural season and reluctantly abandoned the competition after one year. With the Dan-Air sponsorship coming to an end at the end of the season, the league agreed a sponsorship deal with Parasol Professional Portrait Photography and became known as the Parasol Combined Counties Football League. The League Challenge Cup became known as the Parasol Challenge Cup, and the Dan-Air Class Elite Cup was replaced by the Frazer Freight Vase with sponsorship from Frazer Freight International.

Ahead of the 1997–98 season, the league received further sponsorship and subsequently became known as the Courage Combined Counties Football League. In 2002, the league reached a membership of 24 clubs – most notably with the addition of AFC Wimbledon. The introduction of AFC Wimbledon proved invaluable for the league's other clubs. With crowds of up to 4,000 spectators for their home clubs, many clubs would break their attendance records when AFC Wimbledon visited their ground which could generate substantial matchday revenue. The club's first matches in the league also required large numbers of police to control crowds, including mounted police and patrolling helicopters.

In 2002, the league began a three-year sponsorship agreement to become the Seagrave Haulage Combined Counties Football League, although Seagrave pulled out of the deal after one season.

Following the National League System Conference in July 2002, the Combined Counties Football League and the Surrey County Senior League entered into discussions. This resulted in the two leagues merging for the 2003–04 season, forming a league with 40 clubs that would operate across the fourth and fifth steps of non-league football with a Premier Division and Division One.

Another new sponsorship for the 2005–06 season, this time with Cherry Red Records, saw the league become known as the Cherry Red Records Combined Counties Football League.

In 2011, the league accepted the membership of newly-founded club Guernsey. The arrival of the team meant that clubs would fly or take a ferry over to the Channel Islands in order to fulfil their fixtures, with Guernsey covering the expenses as a requirement of their membership. Backed by former England international Matt Le Tissier, who made a one-off appearance in the Combined Counties Football League in 2013, they won the Combined Counties Football League Division One and Combined Counties Premier Challenge Cup in their first season.

In May 2018, Westfield and premier division runners up, Bedfont Sports, were promoted to the Bostik (Isthmian) Football League due to The FA's decision to restructure steps 3 and 4 of the National League System. It was the first time that two teams had been promoted in one season.

The 2019–20 season was abandoned as a result of the COVID-19 pandemic in England. The pandemic led to further disruptions in the 2020-21 season, with it starting in September, before being suspended in December and eventually curtailed in February 2021 by restrictions from COVID-19 lockdowns. The FA later announced on 12 April that the Combined Counties League would administer a new Step 5 division from 2021–22 after another scheduled NLS restructuring had a one-season postponement due to the pandemic.

At the end of April 2023, the Combined Counties League announced the formation of the new Division Two (later renamed the Development Division (Saturday)), mostly for reserve teams and under-23 development sides of the league's member clubs, to which the FA granted sanction. It has currently not been granted a step on the football pyramid.

== Promotion rules and cups ==
Its rules allow up to three teams to be promoted and relegated between either Premier division and Division One; promotion is dependent on the clubs finishing in the top three of Division One each having the correct ground-grading. Division One is "fed" by the county leagues at level 11, the former Step 7 of the National League System, such as the Surrey Premier County Football League, the Middlesex County League and the Thames Valley Premier Football League.

The League organises three cups.

1. The Premier Challenge Cup is competed for by the teams in all three divisions.
2. The Division One Cup is competed for by teams exclusively in Division One.
3. The Grant McLellan Youth Cup is competed for by current and ex-member clubs who have teams playing in the under-18 age group in other leagues.

The Southern Combination Challenge Cup has been labelled "a supplementary Combined Counties League Cup" and includes some clubs in the Isthmian League and other leagues.

== Member teams 2025–26 ==
=== Premier Division North ===
- Abingdon United
- Amersham Town
- Ardley United
- Ashford Town (Middlesex)
- British Airways
- Broadfields United
- Burnham
- Edgware & Kingsbury
- Harefield United
- Hilltop
- Holyport
- Kidlington
- Milton United
- North Greenford United
- North Leigh
- Reading City
- Virginia Water
- Wallingford & Crowmarsh
- Windsor & Eton
- Wokingham Town

=== Premier Division South ===
- Abbey Rangers
- Alton
- Badshot Lea
- Balham
- Camberley Town
- Chipstead
- Cobham
- Corinthian-Casuals
- Epsom & Ewell
- Eversley & California (Note: California, England is part of Finchampstead. The team play at Eversley.)
- Fleet Town
- Guildford City
- Horley Town
- Knaphill
- Redhill
- Sheerwater
- Sutton Common Rovers
- Tadley Calleva
- Thatcham Town
- Tooting & Mitcham United

=== Division One ===
- Bedfont
- Berks County
- Brook House
- Chalfont St Peter
- Colliers Wood United
- FC Deportivo Galicia
- Hillingdon Borough
- Holmer Green
- Langley
- London Samurai Rovers
- Molesey
- Oxhey Jets
- Penn & Tylers Green
- PFC Victoria
- Rising Ballers Kensington
- Sandhurst Town
- Spartans Youth
- Spelthorne Sports (Note: Spelthorne Sports play at Ashford Common)
- Sport London e Benfica
- Staines & Lammas (Middlesex)
- Wembley
- Westside
- Windsor (resigned)
- Woodley United

=== Development Division (Saturday) ===
- CB Hounslow United & Abbots Reserves
- Eagles Land Cricklewood 2nd
- FAB (withdrawn)
- Indian Gymkhana Reserves (withdrawn)
- Langley U23
- London Rangers
- London Samurai Rovers Reserves
- Richmond & Kew U23
- Staines & Lammas (Middlesex) U23
- Streatham (withdrawn)

The area covered by the Combined Counties League is coloured in peach.

== Sponsors ==
The league has had a succession of title sponsors. Cherry Red Records are the current League and Premier Challenge Cup sponsors and have been since 2005.

== List of champions ==
For the 1978–79 season the league was known as the Home Counties League.

Season	Champions
1978–79	British Aerospace (Weybridge)
1979–80	Guildford & Worplesdon
1980–81	Malden Town

For the 1981–82 season the league expanded to two divisions.

Season	Western Division	Eastern Division	Championship Playoff
1981–82	Ash United	Malden Town	Ash United won 3–0

For the 1982–83 season the league reverted to a single division.

Season	Champions
1982–83	Hartley Wintney
1983–84	Godalming Town
1984–85	Malden Vale
1985–86	British Aerospace (Weybridge)
1986–87	Ash United
1987–88	British Aerospace (Weybridge)
1988–89	British Aerospace (Weybridge)
1989–90	Chipstead
1990–91	Farnham Town
1991–92	Farnham Town
1992–93	Peppard
1993–94	Peppard
1994–95	Ashford Town (Middx)
1995–96	Ashford Town (Middx)
1996–97	Ashford Town (Middx)
1997–98	Ashford Town (Middx)
1998–99	Ash United
1999–2000	Ashford Town (Middx)
2000–01	Cove
2001–02	AFC Wallingford
2002–03	Withdean 2000

For the 2003–04 season Division One was added formed mainly of clubs from the Surrey County Senior League.

Season	Premier Division	Division One
2003–04	AFC Wimbledon	AFC Guildford
2004–05	Walton Casuals	Coney Hall
2005–06	Godalming Town	Warlingham
2006–07	Chipstead	Farnham Town
2007–08	Merstham	Staines Lammas
2008–09	Bedfont Green	Staines Lammas
2009–10	North Greenford United	Mole Valley SCR
2010–11	Guildford City	Worcester Park
2011–12	Guildford City	Guernsey
2012–13	Egham Town	Frimley Green
2013–14	South Park	Spelthorne Sports
2014–15	Molesey	Farleigh Rovers
2015–16	Hartley Wintney	CB Hounslow United
2016–17	Hartley Wintney	Banstead Athletic
2017–18	Westfield	Worcester Park
2018–19	Chertsey Town	Sheerwater
2019–20	No champions. Season abandoned	
2020–21	No champions. Season abandoned	

For the 2021–22 season the Premier Division expanded to two divisions.

Season	Premier Division North	Premier Division South	Division One
2021–22	Hanworth Villa	Beckenham Town	London Lions
2022–23	Ascot United	Raynes Park Vale	Sandhurst Town
2023–24	Flackwell Heath	Farnham Town	Amersham Town
2024–25	Egham Town	AFC Whyteleafe	Windsor & Eton
2025–26	Ashford Town (Middx)	Cobham	Penn & Tylers Green

== Notes and references ==
Notes on location where name is not one town
