= 1989–90 Isthmian League =

The 1989–90 season was the 75th season of the Isthmian League, which is an English football competition featuring semi-professional and amateur clubs from London, East and South East England.

The league consisted of three divisions. Division Two was divided into two sections.

Slough Town were champions, winning their second Isthmian League title and were promoted to the Conference.

== Premier Division ==
Isthmian League Premier Division
- Season: 1989–90
- Champions: Slough Town
- Promoted: Slough Town
- Relegated: Bromley; Dulwich Hamlet
- Matches: 462
- Goals: 1,260 (2.73 per match)
- Highest attendance: 1,864 – Aylesbury United – Wokingham Town, (31 October)
- Total attendance: 182,161
- Average attendance: 394 (+28.8% to previous season)

The Premier Division consisted of 22 clubs, including 19 clubs from the previous season and three new clubs:

- Aylesbury United, relegated from the Football Conference
- Basingstoke Town, promoted as runners-up in Division One
- Staines Town, promoted as champions of Division One

=== League table ===
Pos	Team	Pld	W	D	L	GF	GA	GD	Pts	Promotion or relegation
1	Slough Town	42	27	11	4	85	38	+47	92	Promoted to the Football Conference
2	Wokingham Town	42	26	11	5	67	34	+33	89	
3	Aylesbury United	42	25	9	8	86	30	+56	84	
4	Kingstonian	42	24	9	9	87	51	+36	81	
5	Grays Athletic	42	19	13	10	59	44	+15	70	
6	Dagenham	42	17	15	10	54	43	+11	66	
7	Leyton-Wingate	42	20	6	16	54	48	+6	66	
8	Basingstoke Town	42	18	9	15	65	55	+10	63	
9	Bishop's Stortford	42	19	6	17	60	59	+1	63	
10	Carshalton Athletic	42	19	5	18	63	59	+4	59 (Note: Carshalton Athletic were deducted three points.)	
11	Redbridge Forest	42	16	11	15	65	62	+3	59	
12	Hendon	42	15	10	17	54	63	−9	55	
13	Windsor & Eton	42	13	15	14	51	47	+4	54	
14	Hayes	42	14	11	17	61	59	+2	53	
15	St Albans City	42	13	10	19	49	59	−10	49	
16	Staines Town	42	14	6	22	53	69	−16	48	
17	Marlow	42	11	13	18	42	59	−17	46	
18	Harrow Borough	42	11	10	21	51	79	−28	43	
19	Bognor Regis Town	42	9	14	19	37	67	−30	41	
20	Barking	42	7	11	24	53	86	−33	32	
21	Bromley	42	7	11	24	32	69	−37	32	Relegated to Division One
22	Dulwich Hamlet	42	6	8	28	32	80	−48	26	Relegated to Division One

Source: fchd.com rsssf.com
Rules for classification: 1) points; 2) goal difference; 3) number of goals scored.

=== Stadia and locations ===
Locations of the Premier Division clubs
Greater London Premier Division football clubs

Club	Stadium
Aylesbury United	Buckingham Road
Barking	Mayesbrook Park
Basingstoke Town	The Camrose
Bishop's Stortford	Woodside Park
Bognor Regis Town	Nyewood Lane
Bromley	Hayes Lane
Carshalton Athletic	War Memorial Sports Ground
Dagenham	Victoria Road
Dulwich Hamlet	Champion Hill
Grays Athletic	New Recreation Ground
Hayes	Church Road
Harrow Borough	Earlsmead Stadium
Hendon	Claremont Road
Kingstonian	Kingsmeadow
Leyton-Wingate	Wadham Lodge
Marlow	Alfred Davis Memorial Ground
Redbridge Forest	Victoria Road
Slough Town	Wexham Park
St Albans City	Clarence Park
Staines Town	Wheatsheaf Park
Windsor & Eton	Stag Meadow
Wokingham Town	Cantley Park

== Division One ==
Isthmian League Division One
- Season: 1989–90
- Champions: Wivenhoe Town
- Promoted: Wivenhoe Town; Woking
- Relegated: Hampton; Kingsbury Town; Leatherhead; Purfleet
- Matches: 462
- Goals: 1,223 (2.65 per match)
- Highest attendance: 1,176 – Woking – Uxbridge, (28 April)
- Total attendance: 100,128
- Average attendance: 217 (+6.4% to previous season)

Division One consisted of 22 clubs, including 16 clubs from the previous season and six new clubs:

Two clubs relegated from the Premier Division:

- Croydon
- Tooting & Mitcham United

Two clubs promoted from Division Two North:

- Harlow Town
- Purfleet

Two clubs promoted from Division Two South:

- Dorking
- Whyteleafe

=== League table ===
Pos	Team	Pld	W	D	L	GF	GA	GD	Pts	Promotion or relegation
1	Wivenhoe Town	42	31	7	4	94	36	+58	100	Promoted to the Premier Division
2	Woking	42	30	8	4	102	29	+73	98	Promoted to the Premier Division
3	Southwick	42	23	15	4	68	30	+38	84	
4	Hitchin Town	42	22	13	7	60	30	+30	79	
5	Walton & Hersham	42	20	10	12	68	50	+18	70	
6	Dorking	42	19	12	11	66	41	+25	69	
7	Boreham Wood	42	17	13	12	60	59	+1	64	
8	Harlow Town	42	16	13	13	60	53	+7	61	
9	Metropolitan Police	42	16	11	15	54	59	−5	59	
10	Chesham United	42	15	12	15	46	49	−3	57	
11	Chalfont St Peter	42	14	13	15	50	59	−9	55	
12	Tooting & Mitcham United	42	14	13	15	42	51	−9	55	
13	Worthing	42	15	8	19	56	63	−7	53	
14	Whyteleafe	42	11	16	15	50	65	−15	49	
15	Lewes	42	12	11	19	55	65	−10	47	
16	Wembley	42	11	10	21	57	68	−11	43	
17	Croydon	42	9	16	17	43	57	−14	43	
18	Uxbridge	42	11	10	21	52	75	−23	43	
19	Hampton	42	8	13	21	28	51	−23	37	Relegated to Division Two South
20	Leatherhead	42	7	10	25	34	77	−43	31	Relegated to Division Two South
21	Purfleet	42	7	8	27	33	78	−45	29	Relegated to Division Two North
22	Kingsbury Town	42	8	10	24	45	78	−33	25 (Note: Kingsbury Town were deducted nine points.)	Relegated to Division Two North

Source: fchd.com rsssf.com
Rules for classification: 1) points; 2) goal difference; 3) number of goals scored.

=== Stadia and locations ===
Locations of the Division One clubs
Greater London Division One football clubs

Club	Stadium
Boreham Wood	Meadow Park
Chalfont St Peter	Mill Meadow
Chesham United	The Meadow
Croydon	Croydon Sports Arena
Dorking	Meadowbank Stadium
Hampton	Beveree Stadium
Harlow Town	Harlow Sportcentre
Hitchin Town	Top Field
Kingsbury Town	Avenue Park
Leatherhead	Fetcham Grove
Lewes	The Dripping Pan
Metropolitan Police	Imber Court
Purfleet	Ship Lane
Southwick	Old Barn Way
Tooting & Mitcham United	Imperial Fields
Uxbridge	Honeycroft
Walton & Hersham	The Sports Ground
Wembley	Vale Farm
Whyteleafe	Church Road
Wivenhoe Town	Broad Lane
Woking	The Laithwaite Community Stadium
Worthing	Woodside Road

== Division Two North ==
Isthmian League Second Division North
- Season: 1989–90
- Champions: Heybridge Swifts
- Promoted: Aveley; Heybridge Swifts
- Relegated: Letchworth Garden City
- Matches: 462
- Goals: 1,231 (2.66 per match)
- Highest attendance: 549 – Stevenage Borough – Aveley, (21 April)
- Total attendance: 60,893
- Average attendance: 132 (+6.5% to previous season)

Division Two North consisted of 22 clubs, including 19 clubs from the previous season and three new clubs:

- Basildon United, relegated from Division One
- Collier Row, relegated from Division One
- Finchley, transferred from Division Two South

=== League table ===
Pos	Team	Pld	W	D	L	GF	GA	GD	Pts	Promotion or relegation
1	Heybridge Swifts	42	26	9	7	79	29	+50	87	Promoted to Division One
2	Aveley	42	23	16	3	68	24	+44	85	Promoted to Division One
3	Hertford Town	42	24	11	7	92	51	+41	83	
4	Stevenage Borough	42	21	16	5	70	31	+39	79	
5	Barton Rovers	42	22	6	14	60	45	+15	72	
6	Tilbury	42	20	9	13	68	54	+14	69	
7	Basildon United	42	13	20	9	50	44	+6	59	
8	Collier Row	42	15	13	14	43	45	−2	58	
9	Royston Town	42	15	11	16	63	72	−9	56	
10	Saffron Walden Town	42	15	11	16	60	73	−13	56	
11	Vauxhall Motors	42	14	13	15	55	54	+1	55	
12	Clapton	42	13	16	13	50	46	+4	54 (Note: Clapton were deducted one point.)	
13	Ware	42	14	11	17	53	59	−6	53	
14	Hemel Hempstead	42	12	15	15	58	70	−12	51	
15	Billericay Town	42	13	11	18	49	58	−9	50	
16	Hornchurch	42	12	12	18	49	64	−15	48	
17	Berkhamsted Town	42	9	16	17	44	68	−24	43	
18	Finchley	42	11	10	21	50	75	−25	43	
19	Tring Town	42	10	9	23	48	70	−22	39	
20	Witham Town	42	8	14	20	44	56	−12	38	
21	Rainham Town	42	9	11	22	48	75	−27	38	
22	Letchworth Garden City	42	7	12	23	30	68	−38	33	Relegated to the South Midlands League

Source: fchd.com rsssf.com
Rules for classification: 1) points; 2) goal difference; 3) number of goals scored.

=== Stadia and locations ===
Locations of the Division Two North clubs
Greater London Division Two North football clubs

Club	Stadium
Aveley	The Mill Field
Barton Rovers	Sharpenhoe Road
Basildon United	Gardiners Close
Berkhamsted Town	Broadwater
Billericay Town	New Lodge
Clapton	The Old Spotted Dog Ground
Collier Row	Sungate
Finchley	Summers Lane
Hemel Hempstead	Vauxhall Road
Hertford Town	Hertingfordbury Park
Heybridge Swifts	Scraley Road
Hornchurch	Hornchurch Stadium
Letchworth Garden City	Baldock Road
Rainham Town	Deri Park
Royston Town	Garden Walk
Saffron Walden Town	Catons Lane
Stevenage Borough	The Lamex Stadium
Tilbury	Chadfields
Tring Town	Pendley Ground
Vauxhall Motors	Brache Estate
Ware	Wodson Park
Witham Town	Spa Road

== Division Two South ==
Isthmian League Division Two South
- Season: 1989–90
- Champions: Yeading
- Promoted: Molesey; Yeading
- Matches: 420
- Goals: 1,103 (2.63 per match)
- Highest attendance: 426 – Stevenage Borough – Aveley, (21 April)
- Total attendance: 43,752
- Average attendance: 104 (+10.6% to previous season)

Division Two South consisted of 21 clubs, including 18 clubs from the previous season and three new clubs:

- Abingdon Town, joined from the Spartan League
- Bracknell Town, relegated from Division One
- Malden Vale, promoted from the Combined Counties League

=== League table ===
Pos	Team	Pld	W	D	L	GF	GA	GD	Pts	Promotion or relegation
1	Yeading	40	29	4	7	86	37	+49	91	Promoted to Division One
2	Molesey	40	24	11	5	76	30	+46	83	Promoted to Division One
3	Abingdon Town	40	22	9	9	64	39	+25	75	
4	Ruislip Manor	40	20	12	8	60	32	+28	72	
5	Maidenhead United	40	20	12	8	66	39	+27	72	
6	Southall	40	22	5	13	56	33	+23	71	
7	Newbury Town	40	21	7	12	50	36	+14	70	
8	Flackwell Heath	40	16	11	13	69	65	+4	59	
9	Hungerford Town	40	14	16	10	54	51	+3	58	
10	Egham Town	40	12	14	14	39	38	+1	50	
11	Banstead Athletic	40	14	8	18	46	47	−1	50	
12	Harefield United	40	13	9	18	44	46	−2	48	
13	Chertsey Town	40	13	9	18	53	58	−5	48	
14	Epsom & Ewell	40	13	9	18	49	54	−5	48	
15	Malden Vale	40	13	7	20	36	67	−31	46	
16	Eastbourne United	40	11	10	19	47	65	−18	43	
17	Camberley Town	40	11	9	20	44	66	−22	42	
18	Feltham	40	11	7	22	47	80	−33	40	
19	Bracknell Town	40	10	9	21	40	57	−17	39	
20	Petersfield United	40	10	8	22	48	93	−45	38	
21	Horsham	40	4	8	28	29	70	−41	20	

Source: fchd.com rsssf.com
Rules for classification: 1) points; 2) goal difference; 3) number of goals scored.

=== Stadia and locations ===
Locations of the Division Two South clubs
Greater London Division Two South football clubs

Club	Stadium
Abingdon Town	Culham Road
Banstead Athletic	Merland Rise
Bracknell Town	Larges Lane
Camberley Town	Kroomer Park
Chertsey Town	Alwyns Lane
Eastbourne United	The Oval
Egham Town	The Runnymede Stadium
Epsom & Ewell	Merland Rise (groundshare with Banstead Athletic)
Feltham	The Orchard
Flackwell Heath	Wilks Park
Harefield United	Preston Park
Horsham	Queen Street
Hungerford Town	Bulpit Lane
Maidenhead United	York Road
Malden Vale	Prince George's Playing Fields
Molesey	Walton Road Stadium
Newbury Town	Town Ground
Petersfield United	The Southdowns Builders Stadium
Ruislip Manor	Grosvenor Vale
Southall	Robert Parker Stadium
Yeading	The Warren

== See also ==
- Isthmian League
- 1989–90 Northern Premier League
- 1989–90 Southern Football League
