= 1991–92 Essex Senior Football League =

The 1991–92 season was the 21st in the history of Essex Senior Football League a football competition in England.

The league featured 15 clubs which competed in the league last season, along with two new clubs:

- Basildon United, resigned from the Isthmian League
- Concord Rangers, joined from the Essex Intermediate League

Ford United were champions, winning their first Essex Senior League title, while East Thurrock United were promoted to the Isthmian League.

== League table ==
Essex Senior Football League
- Season: 1991–92
- Champions: Ford United
- Promoted: East Thurrock United
- Matches: 272
- Goals: 832 (3.06 per match)

Pos	Team	Pld	W	D	L	GF	GA	GD	Pts	Promotion or relegation
1	Ford United	32	20	6	6	64	18	+46	66	
2	Brentwood	32	20	6	6	77	37	+40	66	
3	East Thurrock United	32	19	9	4	62	24	+38	66	Promoted to the Isthmian League
4	Sawbridgeworth Town	32	19	8	5	67	43	+24	65	
5	Canvey Island	32	19	6	7	49	24	+25	63	
6	Basildon United	32	17	5	10	65	39	+26	56	
7	Bowers United	32	15	9	8	49	31	+18	54	
8	Southend Manor	32	14	6	12	62	40	+22	48	
9	Stambridge	32	12	8	12	60	49	+11	44	Resigned to the Essex Intermediate League
10	Woodford Town	32	12	7	13	46	44	+2	43	
11	Concord Rangers	32	10	10	12	39	52	−13	40	
12	Stansted	32	11	6	15	40	50	−10	39	
13	Burnham Ramblers	32	10	4	18	48	71	−23	34	
14	Hullbridge Sports	32	7	7	18	25	63	−38	28	
15	East Ham United	32	7	5	20	35	72	−37	26	
16	Eton Manor	32	5	3	24	24	71	−47	18	
17	Maldon Town	32	1	3	28	20	104	−84	6	

Source: fchd
Rules for classification: 1) points; 2) goal difference; 3) number of goals scored.
