= Raynes Park Vale F.C. =

Association football club in England

Coordinates: 51°24′12″N 0°13′37″W

Raynes Park Vale
- Full name: Raynes Park Vale Football Club
- Nickname: The Vale
- Founded: 1995
- Ground: Prince George's Playing Fields, Grand Drive, Raynes Park
- Capacity: 2,060
- Chairman: Bob Finch
- Manager: Hayden Bird
- League: Isthmian League South Central Division
- 2025–26: Isthmian League South Central Division, 14th of 22
- Website: https://www.rpvsc.com/
Home colours	Away colours

Raynes Park Vale Football Club is a semi-professional football club based in Raynes Park in the London Borough of Merton, England. The club is affiliated to the Surrey County Football Association and is a FA Charter Standard Club. They play in the Isthmian League - South Central Division and play their home games at Prince George's Playing Fields, Grand Drive.

== History ==
Raynes Park Vale FC was formed in 1995 following the merger of Raynes Park and Malden Vale (formed 1967).

=== Southern Railway Football Section (1925–1963) ===
The first notable prominence of the football club in the Raynes Park community was as early as 1925 when Southern Railways Football Section was formed. The club was originally based at Raynes Park Sports Ground, Taunton Avenue, which is less than a mile away from the current club's home. The club played in the Surrey Senior League and were a part of a notable tour to Belgium to play fixtures against Ostend V.G. Club and Bruge FC in 1925. Little is known about these sides other than Railway had success in the 1932–33 Middlesex League and were also double winners in 1936, taking home both the Railway Athletic Association Cup and the Southern Railway Orphanage Cup. The Southern Railway Team fell victim to the notorious 1963 Beeching spending cuts, a national review into modernising the UK's railways. Southern Railways 1950s home kit was gold and green quarters, the company colours.

=== Raynes Park Football Club (1964–1995) Photo 1935/36. ===
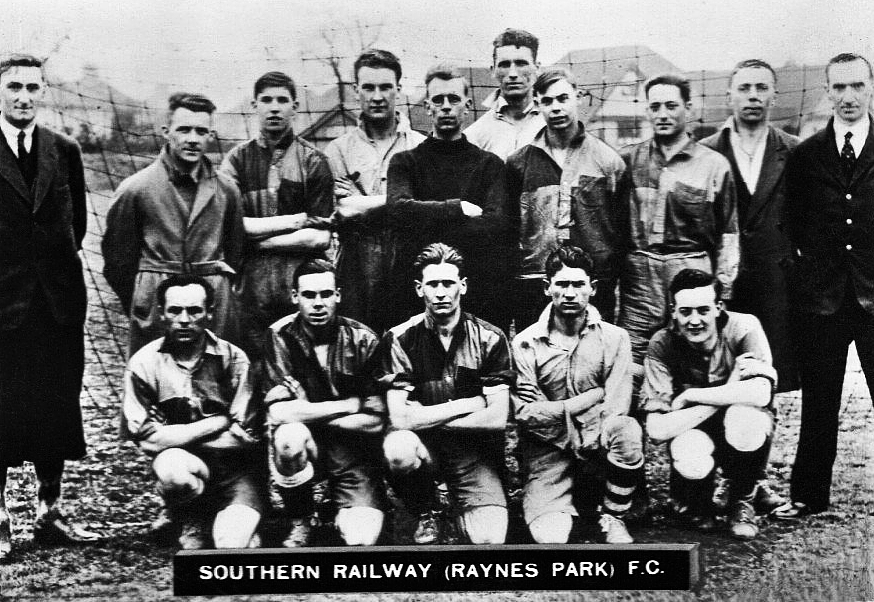
Southern Railway FC

Southern Railway Football Section eventually reformed a year following Southern Railway's deformation in 1964 as Raynes Park Football Club, also based at Taunton Avenue, SW20. Raynes Park FC home shirt colours were Red and Black stripes (similar to AC Milan) and specific testament to this was made by the newly formed Raynes Park Vale in the 2020–21 season where they played their home games in Red and Black Stripes for the first time since their formation in 1995. Raynes Park FC's alternative kit at the time was light blue shirts and white shorts. Raynes Park FC ran five senior teams on Saturday's, of which, the 1st and 2nd XI's played in the Surrey Premier League whilst the 3rd team played in the Surrey South Eastern Combination while the 4ths and 5ths played in the Kingston and District League. They also ran an over 35's team and youth teams aged 14 to 18.

=== Malden Vale (1967–1995) ===
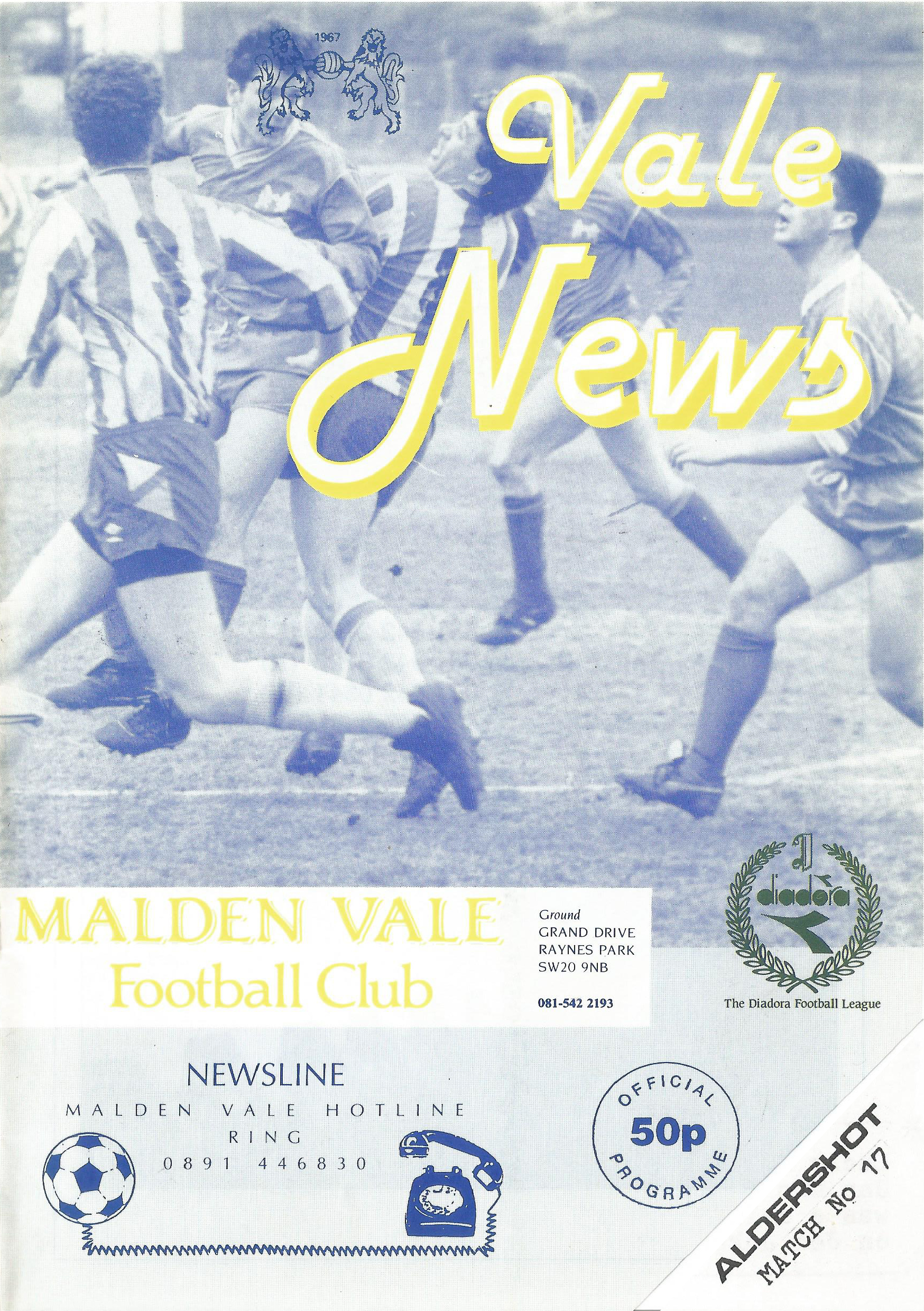

Malden Vale FC was founded in 1967 by the then Chairman Stephen Pearce. They spent their first decade of existence playing in the North Surrey Youth League, the Sunday Sportsman League, South Thameside League & the Surrey Combination League. Malden Vale won a total of 37 honours at junior & intermediate level. Malden Vale gained senior status in the 1977–78 season and was duly elected to the Surrey Senior League. Malden Vale have the honour of being the last ever winners of the Surrey Senior League in 1978 before the league vanished in a reorganisation and emerged as the London Spartan League. The following season the league changed its name to the Home Counties League. After one season in the newly named league, Malden Vale applied to join the London Spartan League a league in which they finished 4th twice and 2nd twice, including in 1984, when they lost out on the title to Hanwell Town on goal difference.

Vale then left for the Combined Counties first incarnation and at the first attempt, won the title. The only league title on either side's resume. Ten seasons later in the 1988–89 season Malden Vale finished runners-up to BAE Weybridge in the Dan Air League and was promoted to the Diadora League Division 2 South. All of the club's members worked extremely hard to gain C Grade status for entry into the league. The club survived for 5 seasons in the Diadora Isthmian League. At the end of the successful 1993–94 season, managers Mick Brown and Ged Murphy left the club to join Hendon. Many of the players followed them and Malden Vale finished bottom of the table the following season.

=== Raynes Park Vale (1995–present day) ===
The new merged club immediately joined the Combined Counties Football League and currently play in the league's Premier League, Tier 9 in the national league pyramid. Their best finish was in 1997–98 when they finished in fourth place at tier 9. They have participated in both national Cup competitions apart from a brief period at the start of the 2000s.

The club's reserve team won the Combined Counties Reserve League in 2002–03 and 2005–06 before it joined the Suburban League for the 2006–07 season. The reserve team was disbanded for financial reasons before rejoining the combined counties reserve league for the 2011–12 season under the management of Terry Tuvey. In the 2012–13 season the reserves achieved the League and Cup double. The Cup was won with a 2–0 win against Worcester Park Reserves in the final. The Reserves also won the fair Play award in both 2011–12 and 2012–13, the 1st team winning the Premier award in 2011–12. The combined counties league took the decision to disband the reserve league at the end of the 2012–13 season so for the 2013–14 season they have re-joined the Suburban League. Midway through 2013–14 Lee Dobinson stepped down as 1st Team Manager to take over as Club Chairman from Fred Stevens. Former AFC Wimbledon Player Gavin Bolger stepped up to take over as 1st team Manager. Gavin Bolger played 107 times for AFC Wimbledon from 2002 to May 2005 scoring 27 goals from midfield. Following the conclusion of the 2020/21, Gavin Bolger and his assistant manager Reece Turner stepped down from their roles, later deciding to join Tooting Bec Football Club.

Preceding the start of the 2021/22 season, Josh Gallagher was appointed as First Team Manager, accompanied by Anthony Panayi (Assistant Manager), Daniel Canning (Goalkeeper coach & Physio) and Chris Williams (Strength and Conditioning). Raynes Park Vale finished the season in 3rd place behind Beckenham Town and Walton & Hersham F.C.

The 2022–23 season concluded with a Raynes Park Vale double as the 1st team were crowned Combined Counties Premier South League champions on 99 points, with second placed Badshot Lea also promoted. Raynes Park Vale were promoted to the Isthmian League - South Central Division. The U18 team under manager Terry Savage won 13 of 16 games to land the 2022-23 Combined Counties League Tony Ford U18 East title trophy.

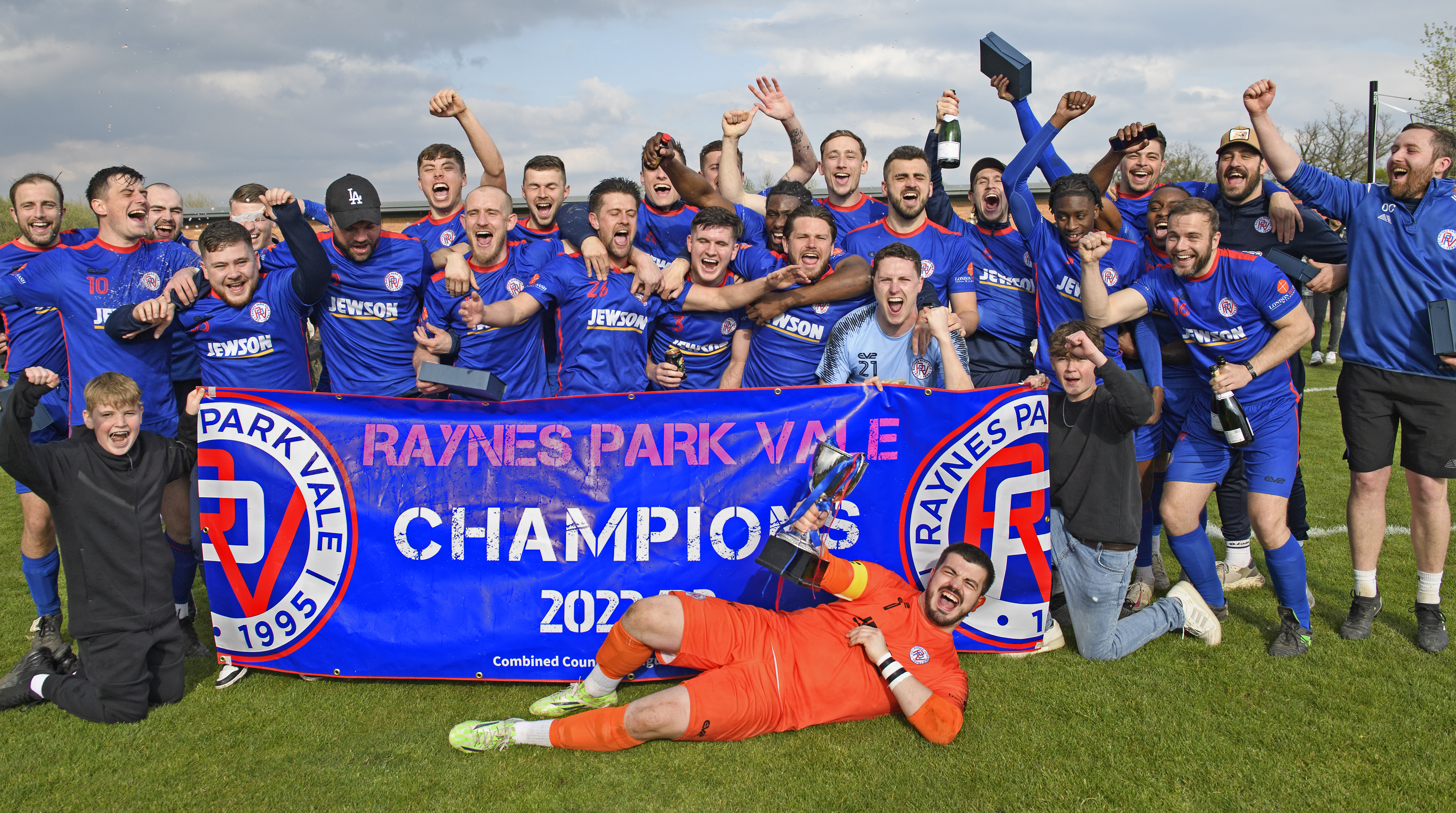
Raynes Park Vale celebrate winning the Combined Counties Premier South League in the 2022–23 season.

Key Dates

- Southern Railways Football Section 1925
- Raynes Park FC 1964
- Malden Vale FC 1967
- Raynes Park Vale FC 1995

== Ground ==
Raynes Park Vale play their home games at Prince George's Fields, SW20 9HA, just off Grand Drive (and often referred to as such). The ground is one of the more peculiar grounds at this level of the game with a notable slope from South to North. As a result of this slope the ground affords a fine view over the Raynes Park valley, Copse Hill and Wimbledon Hill. The ground is only a 5-minute walk from Raynes Park Station, making it one of the few non-professional clubs within 30 minutes public transport journey from Zone 1 London.

The ground has main covered stand on the south side of the pitch that seats 178. Furthermore, there is three covered standing terraces situated around the ground

== Recent Seasons ==
=== 2017–2018 ===
Combined Counties Division 1 Position: 5th (earning promotion to the premier division)

Most Appearances Jack Williamson – 44 games

Most Goals Jack Williamson – 32

Player of the season Nathan Lewis

Players' player of the season Nathan Lewis

RPV finished in 5th place (with 75 points) but were promoted in the 3rd promotion spot as Champions Worcester Park (91 points) and 4th placed Sheerwater (77 points) could not be promoted due to lack of floodlighting at their existing grounds as stipulated by new FA ground rules.

=== 2018–2019 ===
Final Combined Counties Premier League Position: 5th out of 20 – Highest finish since 1998

Most Appearances Jack Williamson – 37 games

Most Goals Jack Williamson – 15

Players player of the Season Ato Okai

Player of the season James Curran

Raynes Park Vale recorded their highest league position in 21 years (1997–98) by finishing 5th in the CCL Premier. They were in 18th place out of 20 on 12 February 2019 and without a league win in 2019, but 5 consecutive wins took them up to 9th by 26 February and up 9 places in 2 weeks. By 26 March the Vale had gone unbeaten for 2 months and 10 matches, winning 7 and drawing 3, when they lost to Southall away 1–0. The good form continued till the end of the season, 27 April 2019, with a 1–0 away win at Camberley Town. Despite finishing 5th, RPV scored the fewest goals in the division with 47 and tied 4th least for goals conceded, 48.

In the FA Cup in August RPV beat Lingfield 3–0 at home in the extra preliminary round. In the preliminary round Raynes Park drew 1–1 at home with Spelthorne Sports but lost the away replay 4–3.

In the FA Vase RPV lost 0–1 at home to Cobham in the 1st round qualifying on 1 September.

A video of an extraordinary Seanan McKillop penalty versus Horley Town on 12 February 2019 went viral on social media. The penalty hit the crossbar, went high up into the night sky, came down and spun back in to the net. Vale won the league game 3–2.

=== 2019–2020 ===
The season was curtailed due to COVID-19. Although Raynes Park Vale had managed to equal their best FA Vase performance (at the time) by reaching the second round proper, losing to Sutton Common Rovers.

=== 2020–2021 ===
The season was curtailed due to COVID-19. Although Raynes Park Vale had managed to equal their best FA Vase performance (at the time) by reaching the second round proper, losing to Hadley FC.

== Records ==
- FA Cup best performance: Second qualifying round – 2014–15
- FA Vase best performance: Fourth round proper – 2021–22
- League best performance: 1st (Combined Counties Premier Division South) – 2022–23

== Player Records ==
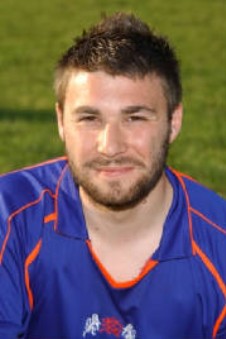
Marc Skinner

Most Appearances:

- Marc Skinner 598 games
- Darren Dobinson – 530 games
- Lee Cox – 480 games

Most goals scored:

- Simon Moore - 129 and 249 games

=== Other Notable Contributions ===
- Marcus Dowdeswell – 300+ games
- Doug Morrow – 300+ games
- Jordan Gallagher - 42 goals 2021/22

== Combined Counties League Archive ==
Season	League	Played	Won	Drawn	Lost	For	Against	Points	Position
1995/96	CCL	42	10	7	25	58	97	34	21 of 22
1996/97	CCL	38	10	6	22	53	90	36	17 of 20
1997/98	CCL	38	24	5	9	86	61	77	4 of 20
1998/99	CCL	40	16	8	16	73	70	56	12 of 21
99/2000	CCL	40	13	4	23	59	90	43	16 of 21
2000/01	CCL	40	15	5	20	63	78	50	16 of 21
2001/02	CCL	42	18	13	11	79	56	69	7 of 22
2002/03	CCL	46	24	5	17	101	79	77	8 of 24
2003/04	CCL Prem	46	12	9	25	72	94	45	16 of 24
2004/05	Premier	46	20	8	18	85	80	68	9 of 24
2005/06	Premier	40	18	3	19	71	82	57	9 of 22
2006/07	Premier	42	15	8	19	69	85	55	15 of 22
Season	League	Played	Won	Drawn	Lost	For	Against	Points	Position
2007/08	Premier	42	9	14	19	56	85	41	19 of 22
2008/09	Premier	42	20	4	18	80	80	64	8 of 22
2009/10	Premier	42	10	9	23	57	85	39	18 of 22
2010/11	Premier	40	11	13	16	52	76	46	15 of 21
2011/12	Premier	42	18	7	17	72	96	61	9 of 22
2012/13	Premier	42	18	4	20	75	83	58	11 of 22
2013/14	Premier	42	18	8	16	79	81	62	10 of 22
2014/15	Premier	42	13	8	19	50	65	47	15 of 22
2015/16	Premier	42	17	3	22	72	96	54	15 of 22
2016/17	Premier	44	7	9	28	43	91	30	23 of 23R
2017/18	CCL Div 1	36	24	3	9	94	48	75	5 of 19
2018/19	CCL Prem	38	17	9	12	47	48	60	5 of 20

== Raynes Park Vale Youth ==
Raynes Park Vale Youth section currently run 15 youth and mini teams ranging from Under 9 to Under 18. The youth teams are Under 16, U14, U13 Blues, Reds & Whites, U12 Blues, Yellows & Reds and U11 Blues & Yellows. The U16 to U12 teams play in the Surrey Youth League. The mini teams are Under 10s Blues & Yellows and Under 9 Blues & Yellows.

== Notable former players ==
- (England) (2022–2023) Ethon Archer – Torquay United, Cheltenham Town, Luton Town, Bromley F.C. (On loan)
- (England) (2021 – 2023) Ben Harrison – AFC Wimbledon
- (England) (Turkey) (2021 - 2023) Neşet Bellikli - AFC Wimbledon, Sutton United
- (England) (2014–2017) Paul Osew – AFC Wimbledon
- (Republic of Ireland) (2012–2013) as a player and (2013–2021) as manager Gavin Bolger – AFC Wimbledon
- (2012–2017) Antony Moulds – Europa Point FC and Gibraltar National Team
- (England) (2008–2009) Jermaine McGlashan – Aldershot and Cheltenham
- (England) (pre-1995 as a Malden Vale youth player) Jody Morris – Chelsea
- (Republic of Ireland) (pre-1995 as a Malden Vale youth player) Clinton Morrison – Crystal Palace
