= British Aerospace (Weybridge) F.C. =

British Aerospace (Weybridge)
- Full name: British Aerospace (Weybridge) Football Club
- Founded: prior to 1946
- Dissolved: 1990
- 1989–90: Combined Counties League, 12/18 (as Weybridge Town)

British Aerospace (Weybridge) Football Club was an English football club based in Weybridge, Surrey. Playing under various names throughout their history, the club played at Combined Counties Football League level, and featured in the FA Cup and FA Vase. They won the Combined Counties League title four times.

== History ==
As Vickers Armstrong (Surrey), they were members of the Metropolitan & District League during the early 1950s, and were runners-up in 1950–51, their first season. They left the league in 1955. During this period, they participated in the FA Cup, reaching the first qualifying round on two occasions.

They later played in the Surrey Senior League, firstly as BAC Weybridge, and then as British Aerospace (Weybridge) from 1977. Runners-up in the Surrey Senior League in 1977–78, they moved to the Combined Counties Football League (then named the Home Counties League) on its formation the following season. They won the league in its inaugural season, and repeated the feat in 1985–86, 1987–88 and 1988–89.

In 1989 they changed their name to Weybridge Town, but completed only one more season in the Combined Counties League before folding.

== Honours ==
=== League ===
Combined Counties Football League

- Winners (4): 1978–79, 1985–86, 1987–88, 1988–89

== Records ==
- FA Cup best performance: First qualifying round 1946–47, 1949–50 (as Vickers Armstrong)
- FA Vase best performance: Third round 1974–75 (as BAC Weybridge)
