= Surrey County Senior League =

English football league

The Surrey County Senior League (previously known as the Surrey County Premier League) was a football competition based in Surrey, England. It operated from 1982 until 2003 when it was absorbed into the Combined Counties League, which had itself been called the Surrey Senior League until 1978.

== History ==
The league was formed in 1982 as the Surrey County Premier League. Teams which were successful in this league were eligible to step up to the Combined Counties League. In 2000 the league changed its name to the Surrey County Senior League, but three years later it was absorbed into the Combined Counties League to form a new Division One of that league.

== Champions ==
- 1982–83 – Farleigh Rovers
- 1983–84 – Farleigh Rovers
- 1984–85 – Bedfont
- 1985–86 – Ditton
- 1986–87 – Bedfont
- 1987–88 – Frinton Rovers
- 1988–89 – Ditton
- 1989–90 – Frinton Rovers
- 1990–91 – Ditton
- 1991–92 – St Andrews
- 1992–93 – Virginia Water
- 1993–94 – Netherne
- 1994–95 – Chobham
- 1995–96 – Chobham
- 1996–97 – Virginia Water
- 1997–98 – Vandyke Colliers United
- 1998–99 – Chobham & Ottershaw
- 1999–2000 – Worcester Park
- 2000–01 – Worcester Park
- 2001–02 – Seelec Delta
- 2002–03 – Hersham Royal British Legion
