= Virginia Water F.C. =

Association football club in England

Coordinates: 51°28′10″N 0°37′22″W

Virginia Water
- Full name: Virginia Water Football Club
- Nickname: The Waters
- Founded: 1920
- Stadium: Alwyns Lane, Chertsey
- Chairman: Dave McBride
- Manager: Paul McCarthy
- League: Combined Counties League Premier Division South
- 2025–26: Combined Counties League Premier Division North, 10th of 20 (transferred)
- Website: http://www.vwfc.co.uk
Home colours

Virginia Water Football Club is a football club based in Virginia Water, Surrey, England. They are currently members of the Combined Counties League Premier Division South and play at Alwyns Lane from 2026, ground-sharing with Chertsey Town F.C.

== Teams ==
- First Team - Play home games at Alwyns Lane (home of Chertsey Town F.C.) and play in Combined Counties League Premier Division South
- Reserve Team - Play home games at The Timbers, Virginia Water, Surrey, and play in the Surrey Premier Intermediate League
- Youth Teams - Under-7s to Under-18s, play home games at The Timbers and play in the Surrey Primary League

== Records ==
- Best FA Cup performance: 1st qualifying round, 2024–25
- Best FA Vase performance: 2nd round, 1975–76

== Honours ==
- Hellenic League:
  - Division One Champions 2017-18 (1)
