= Surrey Senior League =

English football league

The Surrey Senior League was an English regional football league for teams based in Surrey although teams from outside the county were often admitted as well. The league existed from 1922 until 1978, when it was rebranded as the Home Counties League in an attempt to attract teams from a wider catchment area. After one season the league changed its name once again to the Combined Counties League, under which name it continues to operate. For three seasons between 1968 and 1971 the league had two divisions. The top division was called the Premier Division, the lower division was Division One.

== Champions ==
The champions of the league were as follows:

- 1922–23 Egham
- 1923–24 Farnham United Breweries
- 1924–25 Farnham United Breweries
- 1925–26 Epsom Town
- 1926–27 Epsom Town
- 1927–28 Aldershot Traction Company
- 1928–29 Dorking
- 1929–30 Dorking
- 1930–31 Camberley & Yorktown
- 1931–32 Camberley & Yorktown
- 1932–33 Camberley & Yorktown
- 1933–34 Banstead Mental Hospital
- 1934–35 Wills Sports
- 1935–36 Hersham
- 1936–37 Walton-on-Thames
- 1937–38 Metropolitan Police
- 1938–39 Hersham
- 1939–46 No competition due to Second World War
- 1946–47 Leatherhead
- 1947–48 Leatherhead
- 1948–49 Leatherhead
- 1949–50 Leatherhead
- 1950–51 Banstead Athletic
- 1951–52 Banstead Athletic
- 1952–53 Banstead Athletic
- 1953–54 Banstead Athletic
- 1954–55 Dorking
- 1955–56 Dorking
- 1956–57 Banstead Athletic
- 1957–58 Molesey
- 1958–59 Malden Town
- 1959–60 Chertsey Town
- 1960–61 Addlestone
- 1961–62 Chertsey Town
- 1962–63 Chertsey Town
- 1963–64 Hampton
- 1964–65 Banstead Athletic
- 1965–66 Farnham Town
- 1966–67 Farnham Town
- 1967–68 Farnham Town
- 1968–69 Premier Division – Whyteleafe, Division One – Ashtead
- 1969–70 Premier Division – Bracknell Town, Division One – Colliers Wood United
- 1970–71 Premier Division – Malden Town, Division One – Chessington & Hook United
- 1971–72 Merstham
- 1972–73 Westfield
- 1973–74 Westfield
- 1974–75 Epsom & Ewell
- 1975–76 Wandsworth
- 1976–77 Horley Town
- 1977–78 Malden Vale
