= Chertsey Town F.C. =

English football club

Coordinates: 51°23′33″N 0°30′29″W

Chertsey Town
- Full name: Chertsey Town Football Club
- Nickname: The Curfews
- Founded: September 1890 (Note: "Weymouth FC was founded on the 26th of August 1890 about three weeks before our own club [Chertsey Town] was officially registered".)
- Ground: Alwyns Lane; Chertsey, Surrey
- Capacity: 2,500
- Chairman: Mark Turner
- Manager: Toby Little
- League: Southern League Premier Division South
- 2025–26: Southern League Premier Division South, 7th of 22
- Website: https://chertseytownfc.co.uk/
Home colours	Away colours	Third colours

Chertsey Town Football Club is a semi-professional football club based in Chertsey, Surrey, England. The club currently competes in the Southern Football League Premier Division.

The club was established as Chertsey Football Club and was registered in September 1890 and joined the Metropolitan League in 1963. After three seasons, they moved to the Spartan League and finished as runners-up in the 1974–75 season. The following year, they became founder members of the London Spartan League after a merger of their existing league merged with the Metropolitan-London League. Chertsey Town joined the Athenian League a year later and remained until the league disbanded in 1984. They subsequently joined the Isthmian League but immediately suffered relegation to the Combined Counties League. The club returned at the first time of asking as runners-up, and in 1986, began a 20-season stay in the Isthmian League, achieving three promotions and three relegations across the divisions.

In 2006, the Curfews returned to the Combined Counties League with a restructuring of the non-league pyramid and regularly finished in the top half of the table. In 2011, Chertsey Town finished as runners up and were promoted to the Southern League Division One Central after a dispute over the suitability of the league winner's ground for the higher division. However, the club struggled for three seasons before suffering relegation back to the Combined Counties League. In the 2018–19 season, the Curfews won the Combined Counties League Premier Division with just three defeats and were crowned FA Vase winners at Wembley Stadium.

The club won the Isthmian South Central Div 1 and were promoted to step 3 in 2023–24 after winning the title with 100 points and 103 goals scored, losing just one game all season.

== History ==
=== 1890–1963: Formation and early origins ===
Evidence of organised football in Chertsey goes back to the 19th century, although county affiliation did not immediately occur. Chertsey Football Club was officially registered in September 1890 and played its early matches in the West Surrey League. The club's first success came in the Surrey Junior Cup in 1897, and after a one-year postponement, the competition became the East and West Surrey League. A second halt in action followed during World War I, and Chertsey Town subsequently joined the Surrey Intermediate League in 1919. The club rejected an invitation to become founder members of the Surrey Senior League in 1923, and they remained in the league for two decades before World War II forced another break.

In 1946, the Curfews attained senior status and finally joined the Surrey Senior League. The club later became known as Chertsey Town Football Club in 1951. After a few seasons of adapting to their new level, the club enjoyed a halcyon period and lifted their first league title during the 1569–60 season. They repeated their league success twice in the following three years, while also lifting the League Cup three times.

=== 1963–1986: Turning professional and returning to local football ===
Due to the static nature of amateur football, the club could not progress to the preferred Corinthian League, and opted to turn professional to join the Metropolitan League in 1963. The league consisted of several 'A' teams of professional clubs, including Arsenal, Tottenham Hotspur and West Ham United. However, after three seasons, the club decided the cost was too much to bear and temporarily joined the lower levels of the Greater London League for a single season. In 1967, the club joined the Spartan League and spent several seasons in the bottom half of the table.

The Curfews enjoyed brief success as league and cup runners-up in the 1974–75 season, and became founder members of the London Spartan League the following year due to a merger with the Metropolitan-London League. However, they finished bottom of the league in the first season and consequently joined the Athenian League Division Two. After another bottom placed finish, the Athenian League Divisions One and Two merged and Chertsey Town faced an uninspiring seven-year spell, enduring two further bottom placed finishes and only a single top 10 finish. In 1984, the club joined the Isthmian League Division Two South but continued to struggle on the pitch. Just two wins from 36 matches and a three-point deduction saw the club finish bottom of the league and relegated to the Combined Counties League. Nonetheless, success quickly returned to Alwyns Lane as the Curfews finished second and lifted the League Cup before returning to the Isthmian League.

=== 1986–2006: Becoming Isthmian League regulars ===
Chertsey Town's return to the Isthmian League immediately proved more successful with consecutive sixth-placed finishes. The club endured several strong seasons in the coming years, but were forced to join the new Division Three after a divisional split in 1991. However, the Curfews ensured their spell was a brief one and scored 115 goals en route to a runner's up position and a promotion spot. Following a season of consolidation back in Division Two, the club enjoyed another high-scoring campaign and netted 121 times as they finished one point below the league champions, while also lifting the League Cup, League Charity Shield and Carlsberg Trophy. Chertsey's dominant performances continued with the step up to Division One, and the club once again finished as the league's highest scorers while securing a promotion in third place.

The Curfews enjoyed a respectable 15th-place finish in their maiden campaign in the Premier Division, but struggled in the following 1996–97 season. A late rally of results proved insufficient in taking Chertsey off the bottom of the table and the club suffered their performance-based relegation in over a decade. After two seasons of mid-table obscurity, the 1999–2000 season produced another relegation back down to Division Two. Respectable positions were attained for the next two seasons before an Isthmian League re-structuring saw Chertsey Town allocated to the Division One South. However, the step up immediately proved too much for the club, and 139 goals conceded in 46 matches led to a return to Division Two. The Curfews found their footing in the division with top six finishes in all three seasons, but the dissolution of the division meant the club were allocated back to the Combined Counties League in 2006.

=== 2006–2018: The gradual decline in the Combined Counties ===
The club's four consecutive seasons in the Combined Counties Premier Division produced exciting times for the club. After an initial eighth-place finish, the club improved every season and climbed to third before back-to-back runner's up spots. The 2010–11 season saw Chertsey finish three points behind league champions Guildford City, although resulted in their promotion with Guildford's ground unable to meet the demands of the higher tier's regulations. The Curfews were placed in the Southern League Division One Central and despite lowly finishes, ensured survival in their first two campaigns. However, the 2013–14 campaign proved too challenging for the club and the club suffered relegation to the Combined Counties after conceding 117 goals. Chertsey Town continued to struggle in the lower tier and finished 20th out of 21 teams in their first season back. The following campaign produced slight improvements, although the club finished in an underwhelming 18th position. It soon appeared that the Curfews had found their level in the Combined Counties League, with 19th and 15th-place finishes as the league gradually expanded to 23 teams.

=== 2018–2023: The Dave Anderson effect and Wembley success ===
In 2018, with the club struggling to progress from the ninth tier, former club chairman David Rayner returned to assist the club and help improve the playing squad. One of his first actions was the hiring of a new manager, helping to appoint former AFC Wimbledon boss Dave Anderson after a three-year hiatus. His arrival led to considerable changes and helped Chertsey Town find their form in the Combined Counties Premier Division. In Anderson's first full season in charge, the Curfews went on to win the league with six games to spare, finishing 13 points above their challengers and suffering just three defeats. In addition, forward Jake Baxter was named the league's top scorer with 35 goals in 29 games.

However, the season is most fondly remembered for their FA Vase journey, which saw them compete in all ten rounds before being crowned winners at Wembley Stadium. The Curfews beat Woodley United and Tadley Calleva in the qualifying rounds, before recording an empathic 6–1 win against Flackwell Health in the first round. Chertsey Town then struck 16 goals without reply against Horndean, Redbridge, AFC St. Austell, Irlam and West Auckland Town to progress to the semi-finals. In the first round to be played over two legs, they recorded a 1–1 draw away to Northwich Victoria before enduring a 0–0 stalemate after extra time in front of 1,847 supporters. With a penalty shoot required to separate the two teams, all five Chertsey Town players converted their kicks to secure a 5–3 shootout victory and a place in the final. On 19 May 2019, Chertsey Town were crowned FA Vase winners after a 3–1 victory against Cray Valley Paper Mills. The team were captained at Wembley by Kevin MacLaren. After going a goal down in the first half, Sam Flegg quickly responded before Jake Baxter and Quincy Rowe sealed the win in extra time in front of 42,962 spectators.

Following their league and cup success, Anderson immediately announced his retirement from football and club captain Kevin MacLaren was named his successor as player-manager. The club was promoted back to the Isthmian League and placed in the South Central Division, although saw their first two seasons curtailed due to the COVID-19 pandemic. In February 2021, Rayner stepped down from his role as Director of Football. During the 2021–22 season, the club continued their cup success by reaching the FA Cup fourth qualifying round for the first time in their history. After beating higher division Chesham United and handing Jersey Bulls their first ever competitive home defeat, the Curfews lost finally to National League club Southend United.

Manager Ian Selley took over from Kevin MacLaren in November 2021, but resigned as Chertsey Town manager in May 2022 after the club were beaten 3–2 after extra-time in the 2022 Isthmian South Central play-off final by Hanwell Town. Wayne Carter, joint manager of Hanwell, was announced as his replacement. Following the departure of Carter in September 2022, Dave Anderson returned to the club having come out of retirement.

=== 2023–present: Mark Harper's instant impact ===
The 2023–24 season saw Mark Harper take over as manager, leading the club to the Isthmian South Central title. The club went 36 games unbeaten from September, finishing the season with 100 points, 103 goals scored and just a single defeat. Chertsey also topped the attendance charts, with a top attendance of 1,244 and an average of 640.

== Ground ==
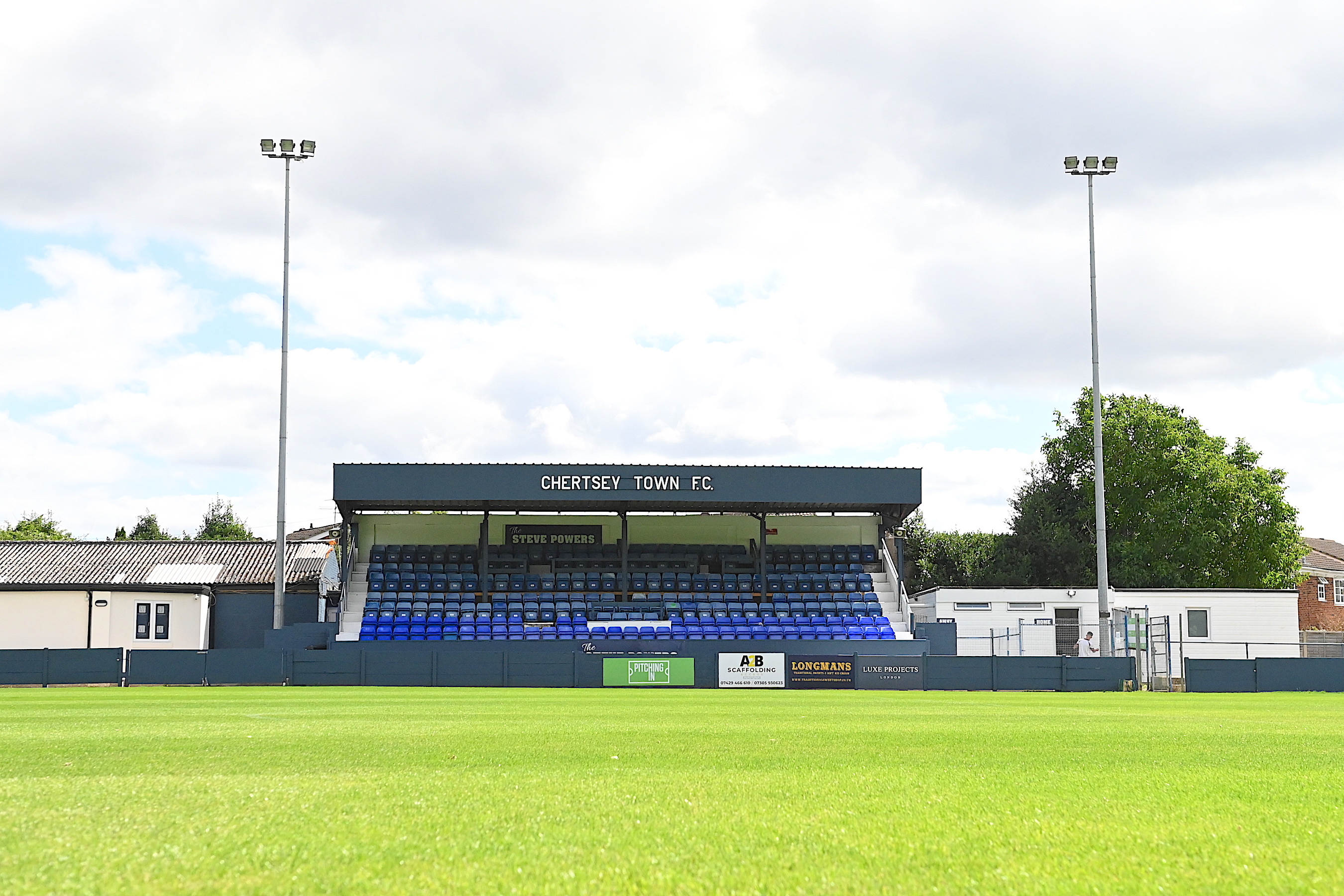
Chertsey Town F.C. ground

Chertsey Town play their home games at Alwyns Lane, Chertsey, Surrey, KT16 9DW.

The club played at various locations within the parish before settling down at their present home in 1929. The ground was donated by Sir Edward Stern to the 'premier club in the parish', with adjacent facilities also provided for Chertsey Cricket Club. The main stand at Alwyns Lane was constructed in the mid-1950s, with covered enclosures added behind the goals in 1994 and 2010. The original clubhouse was added in 1960 and rebuilt with additions in 1976. In 2020, the clubhouse was developed and redesigned in celebration of their FA Vase win.

== Groundshare ==
On 3 April 2022, The Curfews agreed a one-year deal with Dial Square to groundshare at Alwyns Lane for the 2022–23 season. Following a successful arrangement, the deal was renewed for the 2023–24 season.

== Players ==
=== Current squad ===
As of 20th October 2025

Note: Flags indicate national team as defined under FIFA eligibility rules; some limited exceptions apply. Players may hold more than one non-FIFA nationality.

No.	Pos.	Nation	Player
1	GK	ENG	Luke Wynne Roberts
2	DF	ENG	Isaac Olorunfemi
3	DF	ENG	Alex Fisher (Captain)
5	DF	ENG	Darryl Harrison
6	DF	ENG	Eoin Casey
15	DF	ENG	Jermaine Green
25	DF	ENG	Aaron Williams Fernandez
4	MF	ENG	Louis Birch
8	MF	ENG	Ashley Lodge

No.	Pos.	Nation	Player
11	MF	ENG	Conor Lee
19	MF	ENG	Toby Little (Player Manager)
20	MF	ENG	Wayne Ridgley
9	FW	ENG	Jack Mazzone
14	FW	ENG	Daniel Hector
17	FW	ENG	Oliver McCoy
18	FW	ENG	Gary Abisogun
22	FW	ENG	Daniel Berry
23	FW	ENG	Karl Oliyide
7	MF	ENG	Luke Robertson (Duel Registration from Hampton & Richmond Borough FC)
16	MF	ENG	Jack Saunders (On loan from Dorking Wanderers)
12	DF	VGB	Jerry Wiltshire (Duel Reg with Leatherhead FC)
10	FW	ENG	William Montague (Duel Registration with Leatherhead FC)

== Honours ==
- FA Vase:
  - Winners (1): 2018–19
  - Quarter-finalists (2): 1987–88, 1991–92
- Isthmian League:
  - Division One South Central Winners (1): 2023–24
  - Division Two Runners-up (1): 1993–94
  - Division Three Runners-up (1): 1991–92
- Isthmian League Cup:
  - Winners (1): 1993–94
- Combined Counties League Premier Division:
  - Winners (1): 2018–19
  - Runners-up (3): 1985–86, 2009–10, 2010–11
- Combined Counties League Cup:
  - Winners (1): 1985–86
- Southern Combination Challenge Cup:
  - Winners (1): 1998–99
- Spartan League:
  - Runners-up (1): 1974–75
- Spartan League Cup:
  - Runners-up (1): 1974–75
- Surrey Senior Cup:
  - Runners-up (1): 1985–86
- Surrey Senior League:
  - Winners (3): 1958–59, 1960–61, 1961–62
- Surrey Senior League Challenge Cup:
  - Winners (2): 1960–61, 1961–62
- Surrey Junior Cup:
  - Winners (1): 1896–97
  - Runners-up (1): 1910–11
- Surrey Junior League:
  - Winners (1): 1919–1920

== Records ==
- FA Cup best performance: Fourth qualifying round, 2021–22, 2024–25, 2026-27
- FA Trophy best performance: Fourth round, 2024–25
- FA Vase best performance: Winners, 2018–19
- Surrey Senior Cup best performance: Runners up, 1985–86
- Record attendance: 2,150 vs Aldershot Town, Isthmian League Division Two, 4 December 1993.
