= Chobham F.C. =

Defunct English association football club

Chobham
- Full name: Chobham Football Club
- Nickname(s): The Stags
- Founded: 1905
- Dissolved: 2011
- Ground: The Chobham Recreation Ground, Chobham
- Capacity: 100+
- Manager: Martin Ansell
- 2010–11: Combined Counties League Division One, 18th (resigned)

Chobham Football Club was a football club based in Chobham 3 miles (4.8 km) north-east of Woking in Surrey, England. The club was first formed in 1905 and had played at the village Recreation Ground for the last 85 years.

They joined the Combined Counties League Western Division in 1981 and had reached the 2nd round of the FA Vase twice in their history. They resigned from the Combined Counties League Division One at the end of 2010–11 and folded.

== Honours ==
- Surrey FA Saturday Premier Cup :
  - Runners-up 1992–93
- Surrey Junior Cup:
  - Winners (1): 1951–52
