= Malden Vale F.C. =

English association football club

Malden Vale FC merged with Raynes Park to form Raynes Park Vale in 1995.

== Malden Vale FC – History of the Club ==
Malden Vale FC was founded in 1967 by Club Chairman Stephen Pearce. The first decade of their existence was spent in the North Surrey Youth League, Sunday Sportsman League, Sunday Thameside League and Surrey Combination League where a total of 37 honours were obtained in junior and intermediate football.

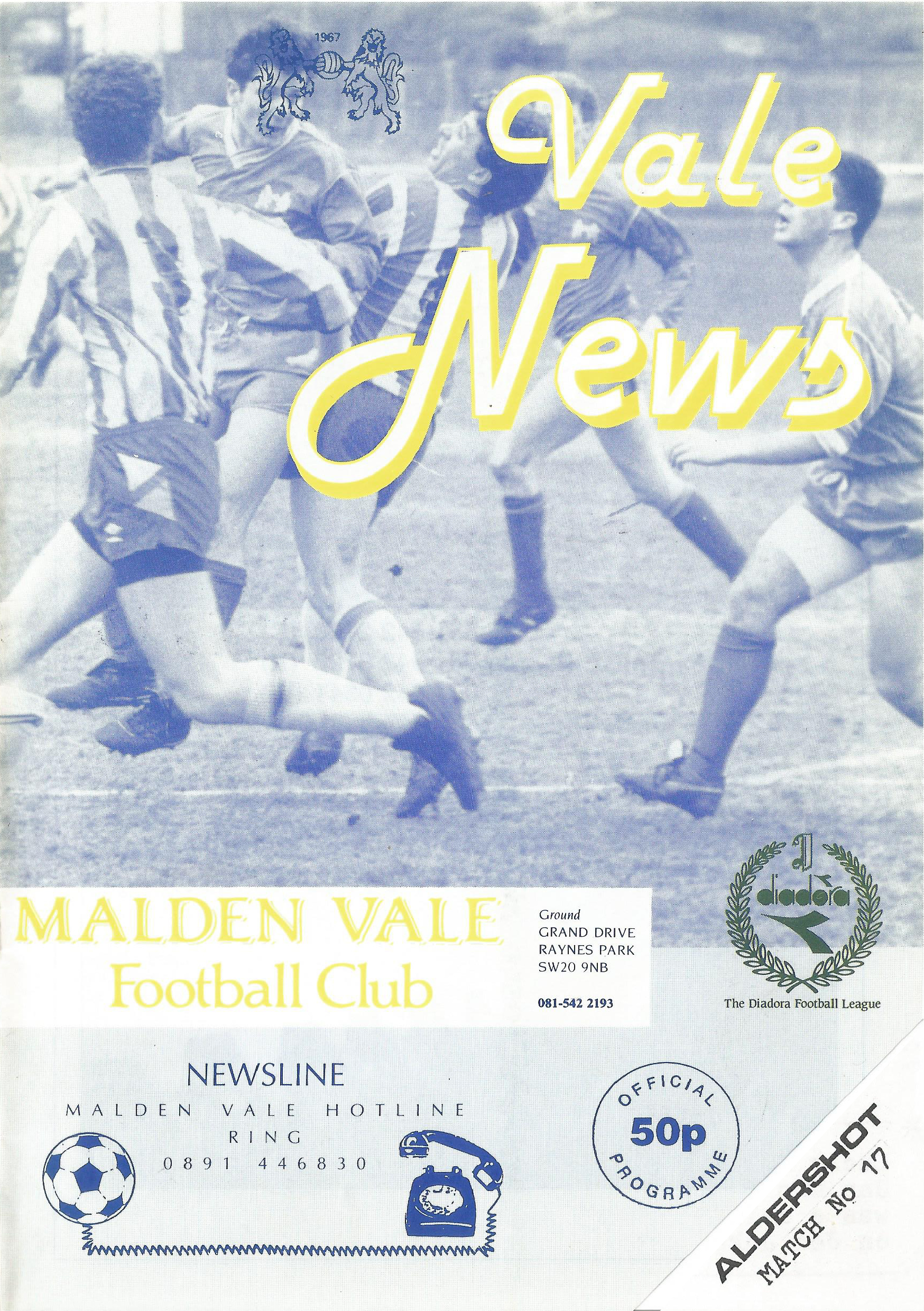
Malden Vale vs Aldershot – Saturday November 6th 1993-94 Season

Senior status was gained prior to the 1977–78 season when they were elected into the Surrey Senior League in which they made an immediate impact as both the first and second teams won their respective championships at the first attempt. In the following season, the Surrey Senior League changed its name to the Home Counties League but, along with Cobham, Horley Town and Merstham, Malden Vale decided to switch to the London Spartan League and were admitted into the premier Division in which they found themselves playing among others, Fisher Athletic, Berkhamstead Town, Bracknell Town, Collier Row and Whyteleafe. A credible fifth position was achieved in their first London Spartan season which also included a win over Camberley Town in the final of the Southern Combination Cup.

Despite always finishing in the top six during their six seasons in the London Spartan League, the closest they came to winning the championship was in 1980-81 and 1983-84 when they were runners-up behind Fisher Athletic and Collier Row respectively. However, the club managed to reach the League Cup Final four consecutive seasons: in 1981 (beat Alma Swanley), 1982 (lost to Greenwich Borough), 1983 (lost to Bracknell Town) and 1984 (beat Collier Row).

At the end of the 1983–4 season, Malden Vale decided to return to the old Surrey Senior league which had changed its name yet again and was now known as the Combined Counties League. The title was again won at the first attempt, with the second team also winning the reserve section. The club also beat Virginia Water, Cove Godalming Town and Southwick on the way to the Concours Challenge Trophy (Combined Counties League Cup Final) which was played on Woking's ground in front of a crowd of over 500; Ash United were duly defeated to give Malden Vale the satisfaction of a league and cup 'double' though it was Southwick, who finished runners-up in the league, who were promoted to the Vauxhall-Opel League. The Concours Challenge Trophy Final was reached again the following season but this time they were beaten by one goal to nil by Chertsey Town.

Twelve months later, at the end of the 1988–89 season, Malden Vale came second to BAe Weybridge and this time were able to realise a long-held ambition by being accepted as members of the Vauxhall League. To achieve the necessary 'C' grading, a great deal of hard work was necessary, but it was a memorable moment for the club when they received formal notification that all the requirements had been met and that a place in Division Two (South) was theirs. The season was disappointing, however, in that they only managed 15th position with 46 points from 40 matches; the club once again reached the final of the Southern Combination Cup once again but were beaten 0–2 by Leatherhead.

The club spent its last five seasons in the Diadora League. At the end of the 1993–94 season, managers Mick Brown and Ged Murphy left the club to join Hendon, unfortunately most of the players went with them. The final season saw Malden Vale at the foot of the table, although a marked improvement came when Steve Smith and Lee Dobinson took over as managers, Malden Vale still finished bottom.

For two years Raynes Park and Malden Vale had planned to merge and finally on Saturday 19 August 1995 the team played its very first game as Raynes Park Vale in the Combined Counties League, an away match against Farnham Town ended with a 3–3 draw, the result of the first home game on 26 August finished with a 3–0 win against Canterbury City in the FA Cup.

Ex-players include Jody Morris (ex-Chelsea) and Clinton Morrison (Crystal Palace, Birmingham City and Republic of Ireland international).

== Records ==
- FA Cup best performance: second qualifying round – 1989–90
- FA Vase best performance: third round replay – 1990–91
