= Farleigh Rovers F.C. =

Association football club in England

Coordinates: 51°19′02″N 0°02′27″W

Farleigh Rovers
- Full name: Farleigh Rovers Football Club
- Nickname: The Foxes
- Founded: 1922
- Ground: Parsonage Field, Farleigh
- Capacity: 500
- Chairman: Mark Whittaker
- League: Surrey South Eastern Combination Intermediate Division One
- 2024–25: Surrey South Eastern Combination Intermediate Division One, 6th of 14
| Home colours | Away colours |

Farleigh Rovers Football Club is a football club based in Warlingham, Surrey, England. The club are currently members of the Surrey South Eastern Combination Intermediate Division One and play at Parsonage Field.

== History ==
The club was established in 1922 and were initially known as Farleigh & Chelsham. They joined the Edenbridge and Caterham League in 1923 and won the Sportsmans Cup in their first season in the league. They were Division Two champions in 1931–32 and Division One champions in 1956–57. In 1958 the club transferred to the Croydon League, which they won in 1959–60 and 1969–70.

In 1976 Farleigh joined the Surrey Intermediate League. They won Division Three in 1978–79 and were Premier Division champions in 1981–82. In 1982 the club were founder members of the Surrey Premier League, winning it in its first two seasons. They were subsequently promoted to the Combined Counties League in 1984. In 1994 the club dropped back into the Surrey Premier League, which was now known as the Surrey County Senior League. They finished bottom of the league in 1995–96 and 1999–2000, but won the league's Premier Cup in 2002–03. They returned to the Combined Counties League when the Surrey County Senior League became its Division One in 2003. In 2014–15 they won Division One but were denied promotion due to ground grading issues.

== Ground ==
The club initially played at Farleigh Common, before buying the land that was to become Parsonage Field in 1959 following a collection amongst the players. They played at the Croydon Arena during the 2010–11 due to Parsonage Field not having floodlights.

== Honours ==
- Combined Counties League
  - Division One champions 2014–15
- Surrey County Senior League
  - Champions 1982–83, 1982–83
  - Premier Cup winners 2002–03
- Surrey Intermediate League
  - Premier Division champions 1981–82
  - Division Three champions 1978–79
- Croydon League
  - Premier Division champions 1959–60, 1969–70
- Edenbridge & Caterham League
  - Division One champions 1956–57
  - Division Two champions 1931–32
  - Sportsmans Cup winners 1923–34

== Records ==
- Best FA Vase performance: First round, 1987–88
