= Bedfont F.C. (1900) =

Bedfont
- Full name: Bedfont Football Club
- Nickname(s): The Orchardmen
- Founded: 1900
- Dissolved: 2010
- Ground: The Orchard, East Bedfont
- Capacity: 2,100 (100 seated & 150 covered)
- Chairman: Alan Hale
- Manager: N/A
- League: Combined Counties League; Premier Division
- 2009–10: 13th
Home colours

Bedfont Football Club was a football club based in East Bedfont, Greater London, England.

== History ==
The club was established in 1900 and joined the Combined Counties League in 1987, where it played until it folded in 2010. It reached the Third Round of the FA Vase twice in its history. During the 2010 strike by cabin crew from the Unite trade union working for British Airways, the club's home ground was used as a headquarters for the strikers. On 27 May 2010, the club informed the Combined Counties League that it would be unable to continue the football club due to financial considerations.

Feltham and Bedfont Town (a separate club) used The Orchard ground for their home games in 2010/11 and 2011/12.

In May 2012, Bedfont Town was on the brink of folding and it eventually left the Orchard. It was decided that Feltham FC would merge with landlords Bedfont Football and Social Club, who were previously involved with Bedfont F.C., to form a new club – Bedfont & Feltham F.C. As Feltham had already joined the FA Vase for 2012/13 only the Sunday teams could fully adopt the new name. The club will be fully operational as Bedfont and Feltham Football and Social Club.
