= Ash United F.C. =

Association football club in England

Coordinates: 51°14′57″N 0°43′43″W

Ash United
- Full name: Ash United Football Club
- Nickname: Green Army
- Founded: 1911
- Ground: Shawfield Stadium, Ash
- Capacity: 2,500 (152 seated)
- Chairman: Kevin Josey
- Manager: Phil Ruggles
- League: Wessex League Division One
- 2024–25: Wessex League Division One, 14th of 20
Home colours

Ash United Football Club is a football club based in Ash, Surrey, England. They are currently members of the Wessex League Division One and play at Shawfields Stadium. The club is affiliated to the Surrey County Football Association.

== History ==
The club was established in 1911 and soon joined the Surrey Intermediate League, where they played until 1968. They won the league in 1948–49, 1951–52, 1964–65 and 1966–67.

In 1968 they moved up to the Surrey Senior League, but had to drop out of the league three years later when they were forced to leave their Ash Common Ground. After relocating, they rejoined the Surrey Senior League in 1976, In 1978 the Senior League became the Home Counties League, with Ash finishing as runners-up in its first season and winning the George Allen Memorial Cup. The league was rebranded as the Combined Counties League the following season, with Ash finishing as runners-up again.

The 1981–82 season saw the league split into Eastern and Western Divisions, with Ash winning the Western section and the overall league title with a 3–0 aggregate win (1–0 at home, 2–0 away) against Malden Town in the championship play-off. The league then reverted to a single division, with Ash finishing in the top five for the next four seasons, before winning the title again in 1986–87. The club won the Premier Challenge Cup in 1997–98, and the following season saw a third title win and victory in the Aldershot Senior Cup. They won the Cup again in 2001–02.

When the league gained a second division in 2003, Ash were placed in the Premier Division, where they remained until being relegated to Division One after finishing third-from-bottom of the Premier Division in the 2013–14 season. At the end of the 2020–21 season the club were transferred to Division One of the Wessex League. In 2023–24 they won the Surrey Premier Cup, beating the Honourable Artillery Company 4–2 in the final.

== Ground ==
The club initially played at Ash Common, but were forced to leave in 1971, moving to the Shawfield Stadium. Floodlights were installed in 1996 and a new 100-seat stand erected in 2003.

== Honours ==
- Combined Counties League
  - Champions 1981–82, 1986–87, 1998–99
  - Western Division champions 1981–82
  - Premier Challenge Cup winners 1997–98
  - George Allen Memorial Cup winners 1978–79
- Surrey Intermediate League
  - Champions 1948–49, 1951–52, 1964–65, 1966–67
- Surrey Premier Cup
  - Winners 2023–24
- Aldershot Senior Cup
  - Winners 1998–99, 2001–02
- Surrey Intermediate Cup
  - Winners 1952–53

== Records ==
- Highest league position: 1st in the Combined Counties League 1981–82, 1986–87, 1998–99
- Best FA Cup performance: Second qualifying round, 1998–99
- Best FA Vase performance: Fourth round 1998–99, 2001–02
- Record attendance: 914 v AFC Wimbledon, Combined Counties League Premier Division, 2002–03
- Most appearances: Paul Bonner, 582
- Most goals: Shaun Mitchel, 216
- Biggest victory: 11–0 vs Fleet Town
- Heaviest defeat: 10–1 vs Chessington & Hook United, Combined Counties League Division One, 14 April 2015

== See also ==
- Ash United F.C. managers
