= Cobham F.C. =

Association football club in England

Coordinates: 51.3292°N 0.4164°W

Cobham
- Full name: Cobham Football Club
- Nickname: The Hammers
- Founded: 5 November 1886
- Ground: Leg O'Mutton Field, Cobham
- Capacity: 2,000
- Chairman: Dave Tippetts
- Manager: Craig Lewington
- League: Isthmian League South Central Division
- 2025–26: Combined Counties League Premier Division South, 1st of 20 (promoted)
Home colours	Away colours

Cobham Football Club is a semi-professional football club based in the village of Cobham, Surrey, England. Affiliated to the Surrey County Football Association, they are currently members of the Isthmian League South Central Division and play at Leg O'Mutton Field.

== History ==
The club was formed on 5 November 1886 by villagers connected with the local coffee tavern; the local vicar offered to supply it with a football. In 1890, one of the club's players, Arthur Smith, died following injuries sustained in a match against Kingston Wanderers. The club affiliated to the Surrey FA in October 1892, and joined a local league. They played in the Kingston and District Football League, winning Division One in 1928–29 and 1929–30. The club subsequently transferred to the Surrey Intermediate League (Central), winning the League Cup in 1933–34 and 1935–36. They then moved up to the Surrey Senior League for the 1937–38 season.

During World War II Cobham temporarily merged with the Avorians Sports Club to form Cobham Avorians to ensure local football continued. After top half finishes in the two seasons before World War II, the club only finished in the top half on four further occasions until the league was transformed into the Home Counties League in 1978, finishing bottom of the league in 1953–54, 1955–56, 1961–62, 1963–64, 1970–71, 1971–72, 1972–73 and 1975–76. The Home Counties League became the Combined Counties League in 1979, and Cobham spent the 1981–82 season in the Eastern Division when the league was divided into two divisions, before reverting to a single division the following season.

In 1998–99 Cobham finished as league runners-up, and in 2001–02 they won the Premier Division Challenge Cup, beating Bedfont in the final. When the league gained a second division in 2003, the club were placed in the Premier Division. However, they were relegated to Division One after finishing bottom of the Premier Division in 2008–09. In 2017–18 the club were Division One runners-up, earning promotion to the Premier Division. When the division was split in 2021 they were placed in the Premier Division South. In 2024–25 the club finished fourth in the Premier Division South, qualifying for the promotion play-offs. After beating Redhill on penalties in the semi-finals, they lost the final 2–1 to Jersey Bulls. However, the season saw them win the Premier Division Challenge Cup, beating North Greenford United 3–1 in the final. The following season saw them win the Premier Division South title.

== Ground ==
The club played at several venues around the edge of the village in their early years, before basing themselves at Cobham Recreation Ground after World War II. During the 1955–56 season they moved to Leg O' Mutton Field on Anvil Lane, with the road name leading to the club gaining the nickname of "the Hammers". In 1995 the ground was formally renamed the Reg Madgwick Stadium after Reg Madgwick, a former player, committee member and fundraiser who had died that year and had his ashes scattered on the pitch.

Floodlights were installed in the 1997–98 season and were first used in a friendly against Woking, which Cobham lost 8–0. It currently has a capacity of 2,000. The main stand was erected in 2004 and another 100-seat stand was installed in 2016.

== Honours ==
- Combined Counties League
  - Premier Division South champions 2025–26
  - Premier Challenge Cup winners 2001–02, 2024–25
- Surrey Intermediate (Central) League
  - League Cup winners 1933–34, 1935–36
- Kingston & District League
  - Division One champions 1928–29, 1929–30

== Records ==
- Best FA Cup performance: First qualifying round, 2002–03, 2006–07, 2010–11, 2020–21, 2025-26
- Best FA Vase performance: Fifth round, 2020–21
- Record attendance: 2,000, charity match, 1975

== See also ==
- Cobham F.C. players
