= Cove F.C. =

Association football club in England

Coordinates: 51°18′1″N 0°45′59″W

Cove
- Full name: Cove Football Club
- Nickname: The Wasps
- Founded: 1897
- Ground: Oak Farm, Cove
- Capacity: 2,500 (110 seated)
- Chairman: Bobby Kaler
- Manager: Dan Goodall
- League: Wessex League Division One
- 2025–26: Wessex League Division One, 6th of 22
Home colours	Away colours

Cove Football Club is a football club based in Cove near Farnborough in Hampshire, England. Affiliated to the Hampshire Football Association, the club are currently members of the Wessex League Division One and play at Oak Farm.

== History ==
The club was established in 1897 and joined the Aldershot Senior League. They won the Division Four Cup in 1930–31, before going on to win Division Two in 1932–33. The club moved up to the Surrey Intermediate League, winning back-to-back league titles in 1949–50 and 1950–51, and then again in 1952–53 and 1953–54. They went on to win the Premier Cup in 1959–60 and the Challenge Cup in 1960–61 and 1961–62, before winning the league for a fifth time in 1963–64. After winning the Premier Cup again in 1964–65, the club won a sixth Surrey Intermediate League title in 1967–68.

In 1972 Cove joined Division Four of the Hampshire League. They won the division at the first attempt, earning promotion to Division Three. In 1976–77 the club were Division Three champions and were promoted to Division Two. At the end of the 1980–81 season the club transferred to the Western Division of the expanded Combined Counties League. The following season saw the league revert to a single division. After finishing third in the league in 1989–90, the club were promoted to Division Two South of the Isthmian League. At the end of their first season in the league, reorganisation saw them moved into Division Three, where they remained until leaving to rejoin the Combined Counties League at the end of the 1995–96 season due to the financial impact of playing at a higher level.

The 2000–01 season saw Cove win the Combined Counties League and the league's Premier Challenge Cup. When the league gained a second division in 2003, Cove were placed in the Premier Division. Despite finishing bottom of the division in 2003–04 season, they were not relegated to Division One. In 2008–09 they won the Southern Combination Challenge Cup, beating Chessington & Hook United 4–1 in the final. The following season saw them win the Premier Challenge Cup for a second time with a 2–0 win against .

After finishing bottom of the Premier Division in 2015–16, Cove were relegated to Division One. They finished bottom of Division One in 2018–19, but were reprieved from relegation after Frimley Green were promoted. The club were transferred to Division One of the Wessex League at the end of the 2022–23 season.

== Ground ==
The club initially played on a pitch behind a pub, before moving to Cove Green. In 1973 they moved to Oak Farm. Floodlights and a 100-seat stand were installed in 1989. It currently has a capacity of 2,500, of which 110 is seated and 100 covered.

== Honours ==
- Combined Counties League
  - Premier Division champions 2000–01
  - Challenge Cup winners 2000–01, 2009–10
- Hampshire League
  - Division Three champions 1976–77
  - Division Four champions 1976–77
- Surrey County Intermediate League
  - Premier Division champions 1949–50, 1950–51, 1952–53, 1953–54, 1963–64, 1967–68
  - Premier Cup winners 1959–60, 1964–65
  - Challenge Cup winners 1960–61, 1961–62
- Aldershot & District Football League
  - Division Two champions 1932–33
  - Senior Shield winners 1937–38, 1938–39, 1946–47
  - Division Four Cup winners 1930–31
- Aldershot Senior Cup
  - Winners 1971–72, 1977–78, 1979–80, 1990–91, 1991–92, 2012–13
- Southern Combination Cup
  - Winners 2008–09

== Records ==
- Best FA Cup performance: First qualifying round, 1990–91, 1991–92, 1993–94, 1994–95, 1996–97, 2000–01, 2002–03, 2013–14
- Best FA Vase performance: Fifth round, 2000–01
- Record attendance: 1,798 vs Aldershot Town, Isthmian League Division Three, 1 May 1993

== See also ==
- Cove F.C. players
