= 2010–11 Combined Counties Football League =

The 2010–11 Combined Counties Football League season was the 33rd in the history of the Combined Counties Football League, a football competition in England.

== Premier Division ==
Combined Counties Football League Premier Division
- Season: 2010–11
- Champions: Guildford City
- Promoted: Chertsey Town
- Relegated: Bookham
- Matches: 420
- Goals: 1,433 (3.41 per match)

The Premier Division featured one new team in a league of 21 teams after the promotion of North Greenford United to the Southern Football League:

- Mole Valley SCR, promoted as champions of Division One.

=== League table ===
Pos	Team	Pld	W	D	L	GF	GA	GD	Pts	Promotion or relegation
1	Guildford City	40	28	9	3	97	38	+59	93	
2	Chertsey Town	40	29	3	8	87	40	+47	90	Promoted to the Southern League Division One Central
3	Molesey	40	25	7	8	102	50	+52	82	
4	Camberley Town	40	25	5	10	101	47	+54	80	
5	Hanworth Villa	40	22	6	12	85	53	+32	72	
6	Badshot Lea	40	19	12	9	83	60	+23	69	
7	Sandhurst Town	40	20	8	12	77	58	+19	68	
8	Mole Valley SCR	40	17	10	13	78	71	+7	61	
9	Cove	40	16	10	14	63	56	+7	58	
10	Epsom & Ewell	40	15	7	18	60	72	−12	52	
11	Colliers Wood United	40	14	9	17	65	65	0	51	
12	Chessington & Hook United	40	16	5	19	57	66	−9	50 (Note: Chessington & Hook United were deducted three points.)	
13	Egham Town	40	15	6	19	80	67	+13	48 (Note: Egham Town were deducted three points.)	
14	Wembley	40	13	8	19	51	74	−23	47	
15	Raynes Park Vale	40	11	13	16	52	76	−24	46	
16	Horley Town	40	10	11	19	51	73	−22	41	
17	Banstead Athletic	40	11	7	22	59	86	−27	40	
18	Ash United	40	10	8	22	47	77	−30	38	
19	Dorking	40	8	8	24	53	106	−53	32	
20	Croydon	40	8	6	26	48	92	−44	26 (Note: Croydon were deducted four points.)	
21	Bookham	40	4	10	26	37	106	−69	22	Relegated to Division One

Source: fchd.
Rules for classification: 1) points; 2) goal difference; 3) number of goals scored.

== Division One ==
Combined Counties Football League Division One
- Season: 2010–11
- Champions: Worcester Park
- Promoted: Farnham Town; South Park
- Matches: 342
- Goals: 1,292 (3.78 per match)

Division One featured two new teams in a league of 19 teams:

- Farnborough North End, transferred from the Wessex League
- Hayes Gate, joining from the Middlesex County League

=== League table ===
Pos	Team	Pld	W	D	L	GF	GA	GD	Pts	Promotion or relegation
1	Worcester Park	36	24	7	5	117	45	+72	79	
2	Farnham Town	36	23	8	5	83	43	+40	77	Promoted to the Premier Division
3	South Park	36	22	7	7	108	44	+64	73	Promoted to the Premier Division
4	Bedfont Sports	36	21	8	7	80	47	+33	71	
5	Warlingham	36	18	10	8	83	43	+40	64	
6	Farleigh Rovers	36	19	5	12	74	61	+13	62	
7	Hartley Wintney	36	18	7	11	64	50	+14	61	
8	Cobham	36	18	3	15	74	80	−6	57	
9	Knaphill	36	16	7	13	72	66	+6	55	
10	Staines Lammas	36	15	6	15	68	54	+14	51	
11	Eversley	36	14	6	16	74	61	+13	48	
12	Hayes Gate	36	14	5	17	79	83	−4	47	Club folded
13	Westfield	36	12	8	16	53	62	−9	44	
14	CB Hounslow United	36	11	9	16	61	71	−10	42	
15	Frimley Green	36	10	6	20	45	82	−37	36	
16	Feltham	36	8	8	20	43	80	−37	32	
17	Sheerwater	36	5	7	24	29	99	−70	22	
18	Chobham	36	4	8	24	52	119	−67	20	Club folded
19	Farnborough North End	36	5	5	26	33	102	−69	20	Relegated to the Surrey Elite Intermediate Football League

Source: fchd.
Rules for classification: 1) points; 2) goal difference; 3) number of goals scored.
