= Notch code =

A notch code is a set of notches or recesses cut into the edge of a piece of sheet film to provide a tactile way to identify the film brand, type, and processing chemistry (e.g. black and white, color negative, or color reversal) in the dark. It enables photographers to identify the emulsion side of the film when loading sheet film holders, and helps processing lab technicians avoid placing sheets in the wrong processor. After processing the notches serve as a permanent visual record of the same information. When the film is oriented vertically (portrait format), the notches are in the top edge near the upper right corner when the emulsion faces the viewer.

== Code notches and ISO speeds for Kodak sheet films ==
Type
Code
Daylight ISO
Tungsten ISO
Commercial 6127, 4127

__________  __    _____
          \/  |__|

20/14
8/10
Contrast Process Pan 4155

______  _  ___  _  ____
      \/ \/   \/ \/

100/21
80/20
Contrast Process Ortho 4154

______  _  ___    _____
      \/ \/   |__|

100/21
50/18
Ektapan 4162

____________  _     ___
            \/ |___|

100/22
100/22
Fine Grain Positive 7302

_______________     ___
               |___|

40/17
10/11
Kodalith Ortho 2556, Type 3
Unnotched
10/15
6/9
Kodalith Pan 2568

_______  _  ___  _____
       \/ \/   \/

40/17
36/16
Plus-X Pan Professional 4147

____  _  _  ___     __
    \/ \/ \/   |___|

125/22
125/22
Plus-X Pan Professional (PXT)

______  ___    _    __
      \/   \__/ \__/

125/22
125/22
Portra 160

_____________  __       __
             ╰╯   \____/

160

Tri-X Pan Professional 4164

_________  _  _  _____
         \/ \/ \/

320/26
320/26
Tri-X 320 (TXP)

_______      _    ___
       \/\/\/ |__|

320/26
320/26
Super-XX Pan 4142

____________  _  _____
            \/ \/

200/24
200/24
Tri-X Ortho 4163

__  _  ____    _    __
  \/ \/    \__/ \__/

320/26
200/24
Royal-X Pan 4166

___  _  _  ___     ___
   \/ \/ \/   |___|

1250/32
1250/32
Royal Pan 4141

____________  ___  ___
            \/   \/

400/27
400/27
T-Max 100 Professional 5052

_____  ________  _____
     \/        \/

100/21
100/21
T-Max 100 (100TMX)

_________        ____
         \/\/\/\/

100/21
100/21
T-Max 400 Professional 5053

_______  _  _     ____
       \/ \/ |___|

400/27
400/27
T-Max 400 (400TMY)

_________    _    ___
         \/\/ |__|

400/27
400/27
Professional Copy 4125

__  ____  _    _    __
  \/    \/ \__/ \__/

25/15
12/12
Pan Masking Film 4570

__  __________  __  __
  \/          \/  \/

Matrix Film 4150

_  _  _    ____    ___
 \/ \/ \__/    \__/

Pan Matrix 4149

__  ____  ____  ______
  \/    \/    \/

Separation Negative 4131, Type 1

____  _    _    ______
    \/ \__/ \__/

Separation Negative 4133, Type 2

_______    __    _____
       \__/  \__/

High Speed Infrared 4143

____  __  __  __     ___
    \/  \/  \/  |___|

Ektar 100 Color Negative Film

_____________     _____
             \___/

100

Ektachrome 64 Professional 6117

___________      _  __
           ╰----╯ \/

64/19
16/13 (with 80A)
Ektachrome 100 Professional 6122

_____  _      _  _  __
     \/ ╰----╯ \/ \/

100/21
25/15 (with 80A)
Ektachrome 100 Plus Professional 6105

________      _  _  __
        ╰----╯ \/ \/

100/21
25/15 (with 80A)
Ektachrome 200 Professional 6176

__  _  _      _  _  __
  \/ \/ ╰----╯ \/ \/

200/24
50/18 (with 80A)
Ektachrome 64T Professional 6118

________  _      _  __
        \/ ╰----╯ \/

40/17 (with 85B)
64/19
Ektachrome Duplicating 6121

_____  _  _      _  __
     \/ \/ ╰----╯ \/

== Code notches and ISO speeds for Ilford sheet films ==
Type
Code
Daylight ISO
Tungsten ISO
Ortho Plus

_______________  _____
               ╰╯

80/20
40/17
FP4 Plus (New)

____    _  _____    ___ 
    ╰--╯ ╰╯     ╰--╯

125/22

FP4 Plus (Old)

________  _______  ___
        ╰╯     ╰╯

125/22

HP5 Plus (New)

__   ______  ___   ___
  ╰-╯    ╰╯  ╰-╯

400/27

HP5 Plus (Old)

___  ___  _______  ___
   ╰╯ ╰╯      ╰╯

400/27

Delta 100 Professional

_   __  _  ___   _____
 ╰-╯╰╯╰╯  ╰-╯

100/21

Delta 400 Professional (New)

_   ____  _  _   _____
 ╰-╯  ╰╯╰╯╰-╯

400/27

Delta 400 Professional (Old)

__________  _  __  ___
          ╰╯╰╯╰╯

400/27

XP2 Super (New)

_   __  _  _  __   ___
 ╰-╯╰╯╰╯╰╯╰-╯

400/27

XP2 Super (Old)

____  _  __  _  ______
    ╰╯╰╯╰╯╰╯

400/27

== Code notches and ISO speeds for Fuji sheet films ==
Type
Code
Daylight ISO
Tungsten ISO
Fujichrome Velvia

__________    ________
         ╰---╯           

50/18
16/13
Fujichrome Velvia 100

_  ______     ________
 ╰╯    ╰---╯

100/21
32/16
Fujichrome Velvia 100F

__  __  __    ________
  ╰╯╰╯╰---╯     

100/21
32/16
Fujichrome Astia 100F

_  _  ____    ________
╰╯╰╯  ╰---╯     

100/21
32/16
Fujichrome Provia 100F

_______  _     _  ____
      ╰╯╰---╯╰╯

100/21
32/16
Fujichrome T64

_______  _     _  __ _
      ╰╯╰---╯╰╯╰╯

64/19
32/16
Fujicolor Pro 160S

________       ___  __
        \_____/   ╰╯
                     O

160/23
50/18
Fujicolor Pro 160C

__  _____      _______
  ╰╯   \_____/
                     O

160/23
50/18
Fujicolor NPL 160

__  _  __      ___  __
 ╰╯╰╯ \____/   ╰╯ 
                     0

100/21
160/23
Fujichrome Duplicating Film CDU Type II

__________    ____  __
         ╰---╯  ╰╯     

Fujicolor Internegative Film

__________      _   ___
          \____/ ╰-╯ 
                      0

== Sources ==
- Note 31.3 of the RIT PhotoForum List FAQ File
- Kodak Tech Pub F3
- Kodak Technical Publication P7-4A: Reference Data for Kodak Professional Photographic Products.
- More film notch codes.
- Kodak information on Plus-X Pan Professional with correct notch code http://www.kodak.com/global/en/professional/support/techPubs/f8/f8.pdf
