= HGFC =

HGFC can refer to:

- Hayes Gate F.C.
- Holmer Green F.C.
