= Orkhan Ibadov =

Ukrainian footballer (born 1998)

Personal information
- Full name: Orkhan Elkhanovych Ibadov
- Date of birth: 20 June 1998 (age 28)
- Place of birth: Ukraine
- Height: 1.89 m (6 ft 2 in)
- Position: Centre-back

Team information
- Current team: Sport London e Benfica
- Number: 23

Youth career
- 2010: Lokomotyv Kyiv
- 2011–2012: Metalurh Zaporizhzhia
- 2012: Zirka Kyiv
- 2012–2013: Youth Sportive School #15 Kyiv
- 2013–2015: Dynamo Kyiv

Senior career*
Years	Team	Apps	(Gls)
2015–2019	Arsenal Kyiv	17	(0)
2019–2020	Mynai	10	(0)
2021	Lyubomyr Stavyshche	22	(1)
2024–	Sport London e Benfica	5	(0)
- * Club domestic league appearances and goals as of 9 December 2021

Orkhan Ibadov (Azerbaijani: Orxan Elxan oğlu İbadov, Ukrainian: Орхан Ельханович Ібадов; born 20 June 1998) is a Ukrainian footballer of Azerbaijani origin, who plays as a centre-back for English club Sport London e Benfica.

== Career ==
Ibadov is a product of the different Ukrainian youth sportive schools.

In September 2017 he signed a contract with FC Arsenal Kyiv in the Ukrainian First League.

During the 2024–25 season, Ibadov signed for English club Sport London e Benfica.
