= Kodak T-MAX =

Family of tabular-grain panchromatic black and white films

T-MAX
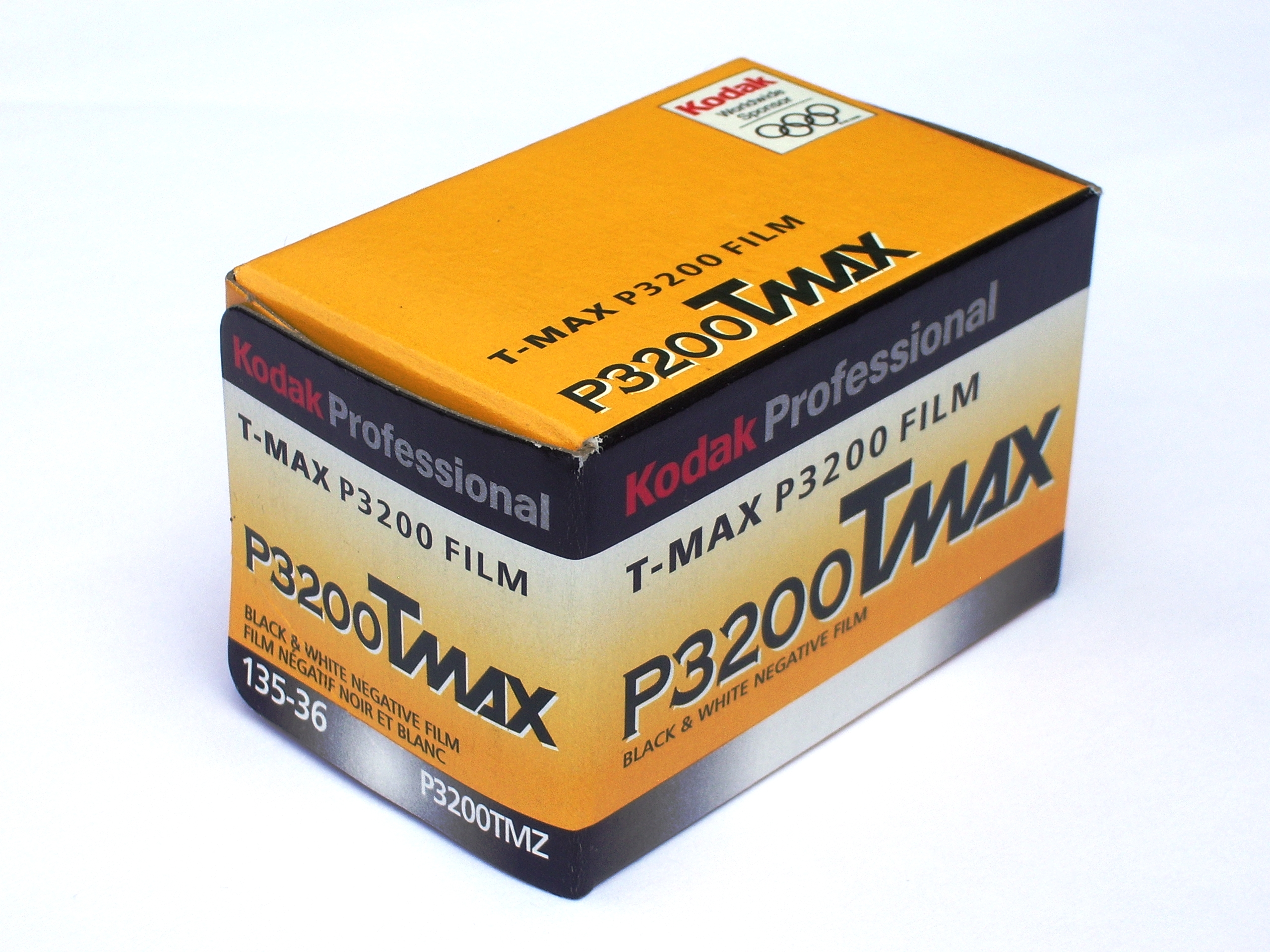
- A box of a 2002 version of T-MAX 3200 film
- Maker: Kodak Alaris
- Speed: 100/21°, 400/27°, 3200/36°
- Type: B&W print
- Process: Gelatin-silver
- Format: 35 mm, 120, sheets 4x5 and Special Order up to 8x10 (only Tmax 100 and 400)
- Application: General, surveillance, art photography

Kodak Professional T-MAX Film is a continuous tone, panchromatic, tabular-grain black and white negative film originally developed and manufactured by Eastman Kodak since 1986. It is still manufactured by Eastman Kodak but distributed and marketed by Kodak Alaris, as with other products under Kodak Professional banner.

It is sold in three speeds: ISO 100, ISO 400 and a multi-speed film marked as a nominal "3200". To easily identify the emulsion, for each film speed, one letter in the edge marking is altered with ISO 100 being TMX, ISO 400 being TMY and the "3200" version being TMZ.

== Details ==
Eastman Kodak still manufactures the films but following its Chapter 11 bankruptcy in 2012, responsibility for distribution and marketing, as with other products under Kodak Professional brand, was given to Kodak Alaris, a separate company controlled by the Kodak UK pension fund.

It is sold in three speeds: 100 (TMX), 400 (TMY-2) and 3200 (TMZ). The 100 and 400 speeds are given as ISO numbers, but the 3200 is sold as a multi-speed film. T-MAX 100, due to its very high resolution of 200 lines/mm, is often used when testing the sharpness of lenses.

The 3200 speed is actually nominally 800 to 1000 speed, but it is meant to be push-processed and the DX CAS code on the 135 film cartridges is set to 3200 speed. It has uses in surveillance and other work where it can be given a pushed exposure index between 1600 and 25000. It is also used in X-ray cameras in high-neutron environments where CCDs are unviable due to noise induced by neutron impacts, such as the National Ignition Facility.

== Later developments ==
In early 2002, Kodak replaced its similarly titled Kodak T-MAX Professional Film with Kodak Professional T-MAX Film. There was also a slight change to the packaging. The main difference between the two are in the processing times.

In October 2007, Kodak revised the 400-speed film, giving it the name TMY-2 instead of TMY. In the process Kodak increased the resolution from 125 lines/mm to 200 lines/mm, which is on par with their 100 speed film.

On October 1, 2012, Kodak announced the discontinuation of Kodak Professional T-MAX P3200 film due to the high expense of manufacturing it for only a limited user demand. On February 23, 2018, Kodak announced the return of the film for March 2018.

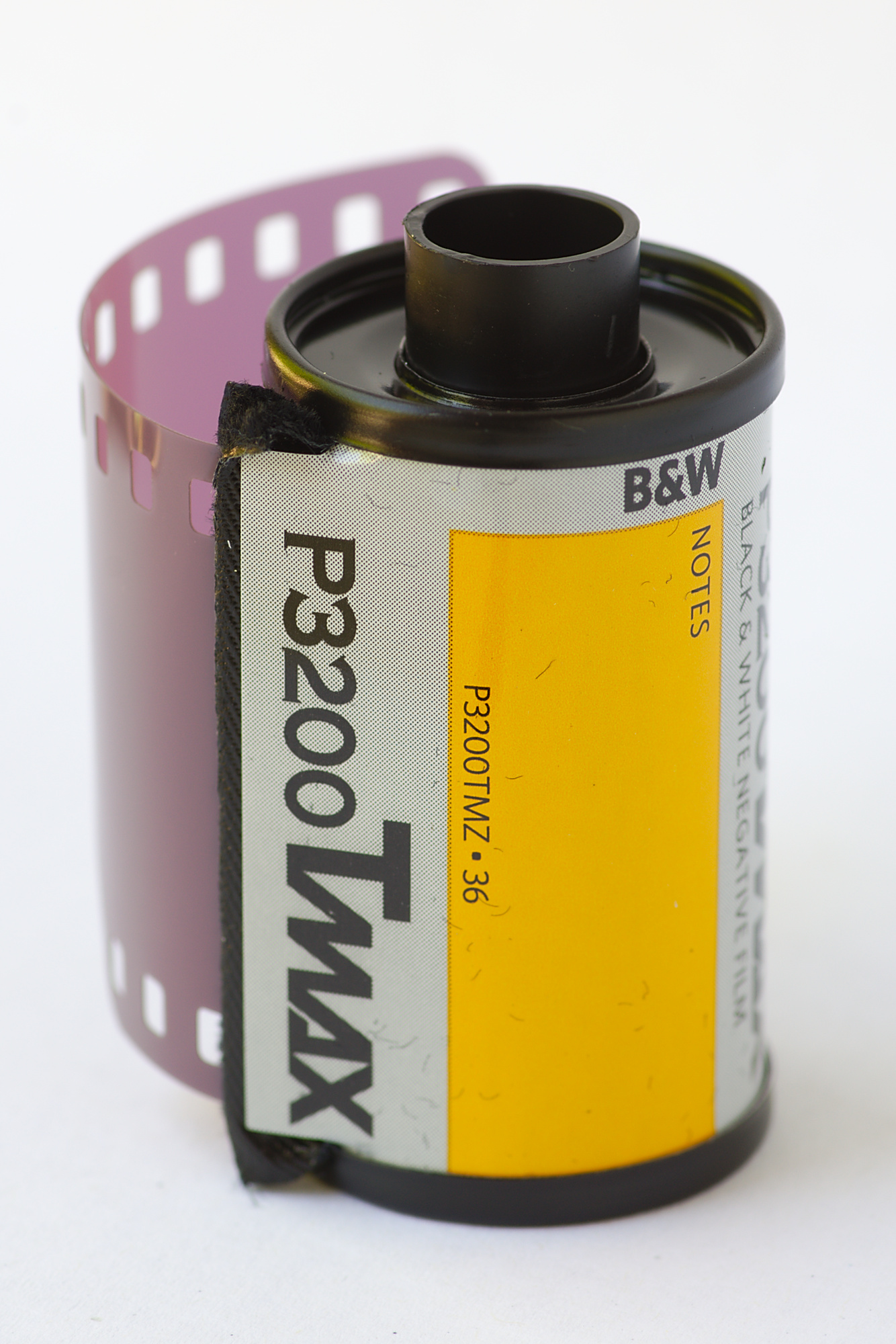
35mm film (new 2018 stock)

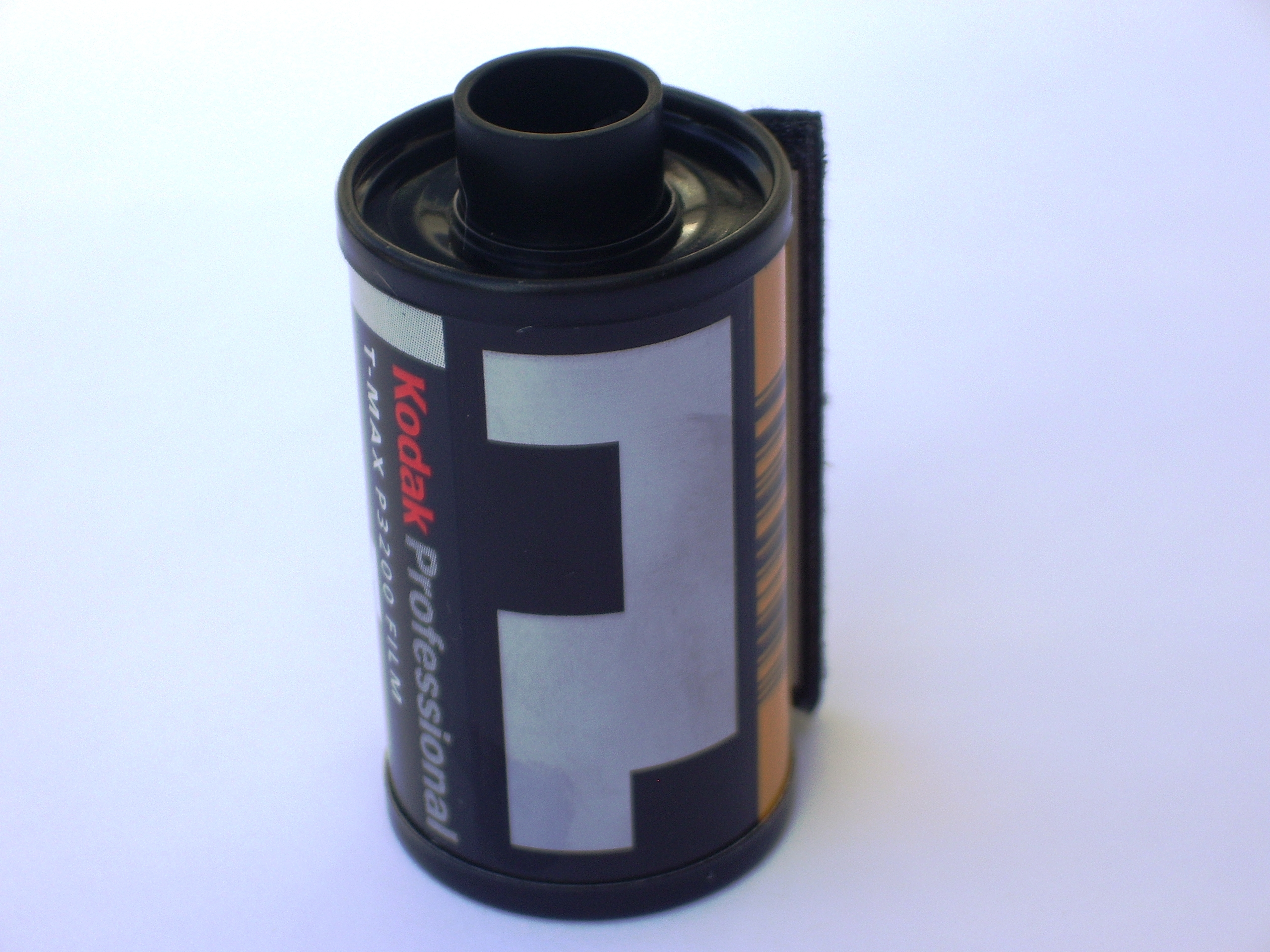
35mm film showing CAS codes for 3200 speed

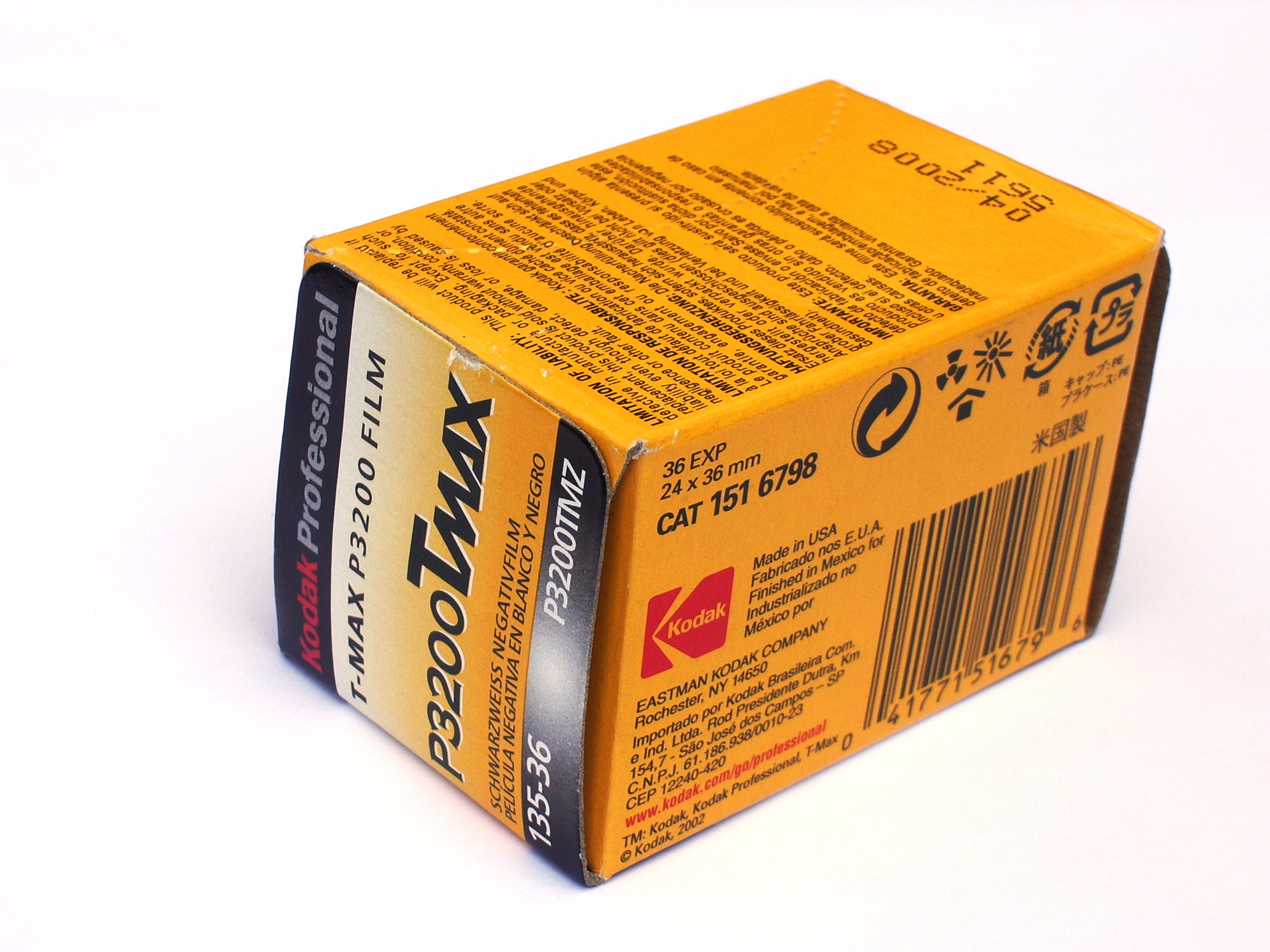
Back of T-MAX 3200 box. 2002 version, expired April 2008. Note that Kodak does not state that film speed is to ISO standard

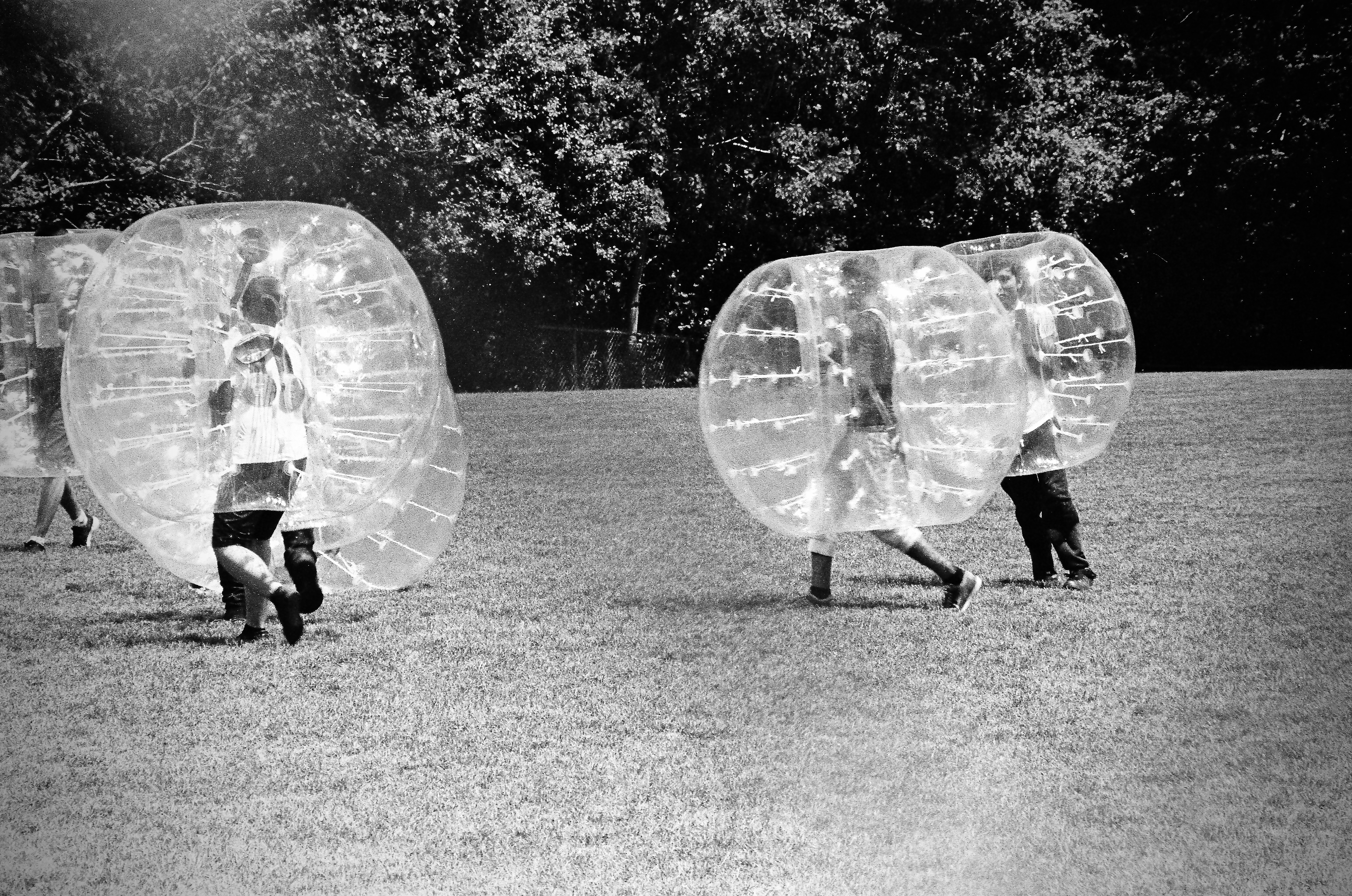
A sample photo taken with Kodak T-MAX 400

== See also ==
- Kodak Tri-X
- List of photographic films
- List of discontinued photographic films
