= Kodak Tri-X =

Brand of black-and-white photographic film

Tri-X
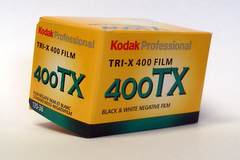
- A box of a 2002 version of Tri-X film
- Maker: Kodak
- Speed: 400/27°
- Type: B&W print
- Process: Gelatin-silver
- Format: 35 mm, 120
- Application: General

Tri-X Professional
- Maker: Kodak
- Speed: 320/26°
- Type: B&W print
- Process: Gelatin-silver
- Format: sheets
- Application: General

Tri-X is a black and white photographic film produced by the Eastman Kodak Company. Between 2013 to 2026, it was distributed by Kodak Alaris which controls the Kodak Professional product line under which it is grouped. As of January 2026, Tri-X is distributed directly by the Eastman Kodak Company. The combination of hand-held cameras and high-speed Tri-X film was transformative for photojournalism and for cinema.

== Overview ==
Introduced around 1940, in sheets rated at ASA daylight 200 and tungsten 160, it was one of Kodak's first high-speed (for the time) black and white films. Tri-X was released in 35 mm and 120 formats in 1954. Currently it is available in two speeds, ISO 320/26° (320TXP) and 400/27° (400TX). Tri-X 400 is the more common of the two, available in 24- and 36-exposure rolls of 35 mm and rolls of 120 as well as 50 and 100 ft bulk rolls of 35 mm. Tri-X 320 is available in 4×5", 5×7", and 8×10" sheets.

Tri-X 400 is usually rated at ISO 400 when processed in standard developers and remains among the fastest black and white films today. Push processing Tri-X to a higher "exposure index" of EI 800 in a standard developer yields very good results, while further pushing to EI 1600 requires more sophisticated processing. A popular method for pushing Tri-X film is using highly diluted developers with little or no agitation and extended development times. This method which is referred to as "stand" or "semi-stand" development, can allow the film to be pushed to speeds up to EI 3200 or 6400.

Tri-X panchromatic film was once one of the most popular films used by photojournalists and many amateurs. It was manufactured by Eastman Kodak in the U.S., Kodak Canada, and Kodak Ltd in the UK. Kodak data-sheets once recommended different processing times depending on where the film was manufactured. Its sales declined in the 1970s and 1980s due to the falling price and increasing popularity of color film. Since the advent of digital photography, Tri-X has all but fallen out of use in newspaper journalism, though it remains popular in documentary journalism.

Tri-X has undergone a number of minor engineering changes during its long history. An early change in ASA (ISO) speed from 200 to 400, around 1960, was due to a change in the ASA standard rather than the film formulation. In 2007, Tri-X was extensively re-engineered, receiving the new designation 400TX in place of TX or TX400, and became finer-grained. The amount of silver in the film stock was reduced.

Tri-X also exists as a reversal film for the 16 mm and Super-8 cine film formats. The speed for tungsten lighting (3200 K) is ISO 160 and for daylight ISO 200 when processed as reversal. It can also be processed as a negative at a small loss of speed while the grain will be slightly increased.

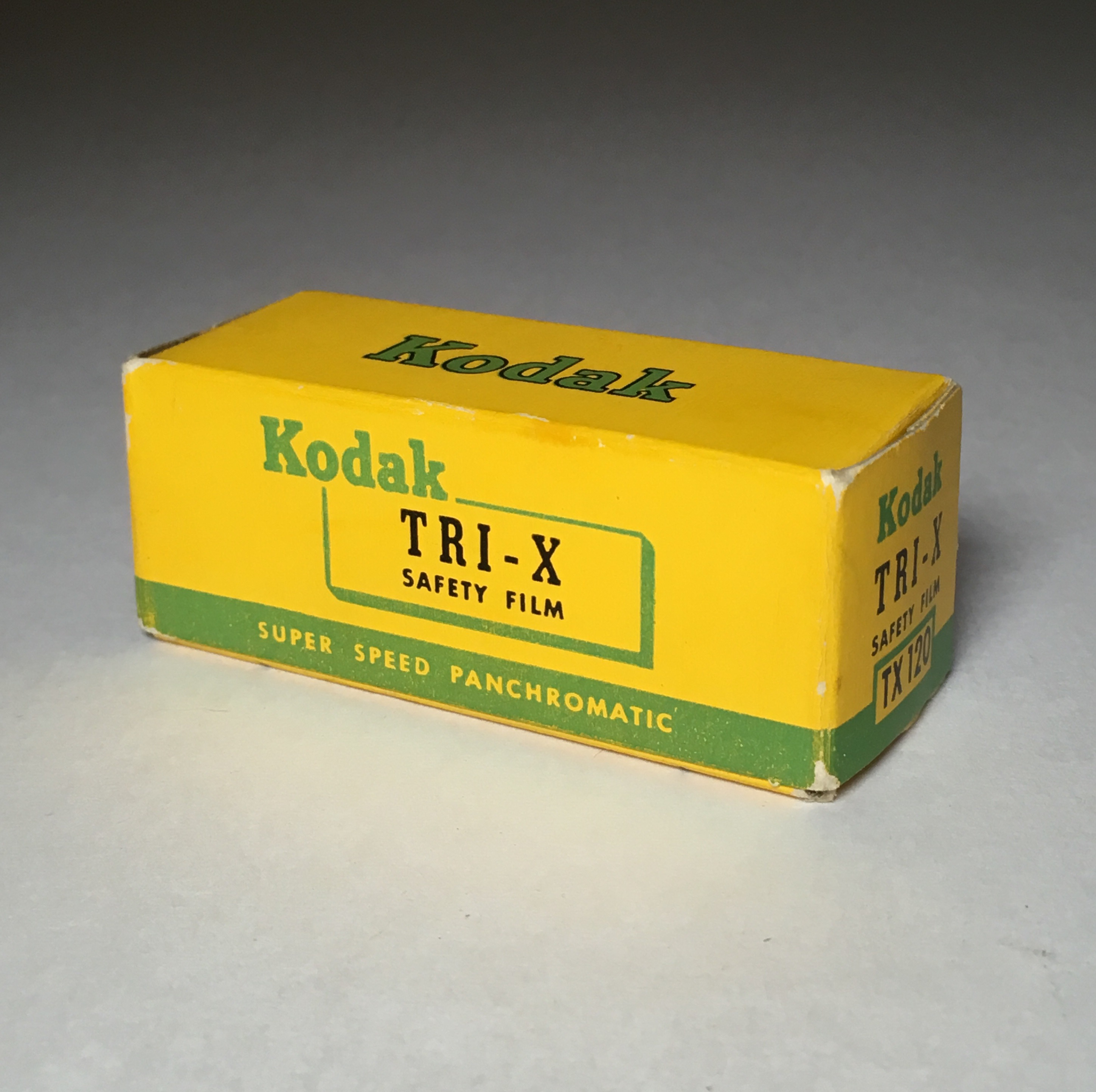
Kodak Tri-X 120 Film (Expired: March 1959)

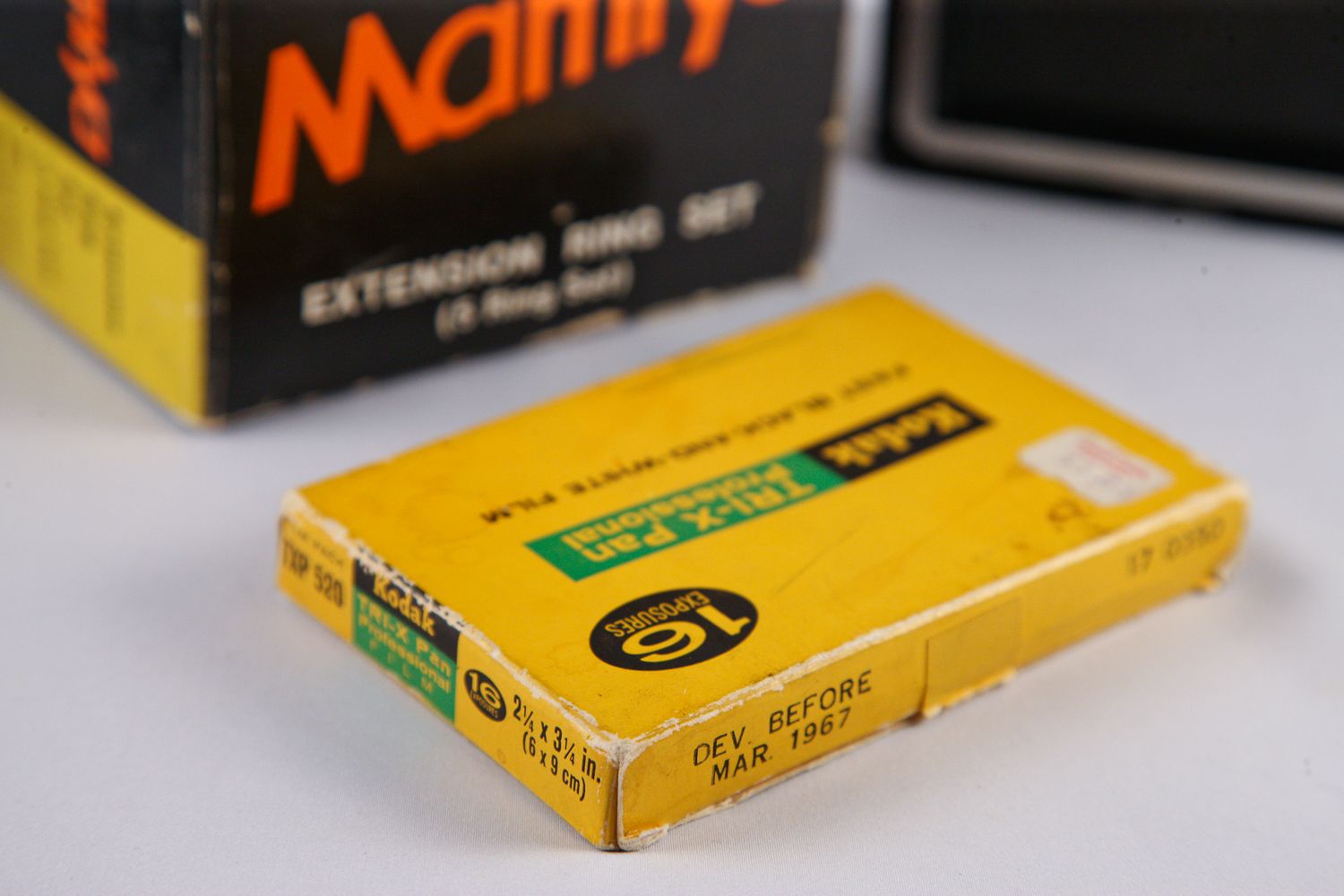
Tri-X 6x9 Sheet Film Expired in 1967

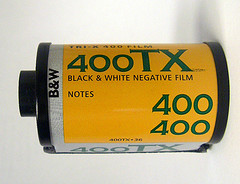
A Tri-X 35mm (135) film canister, version 2002.

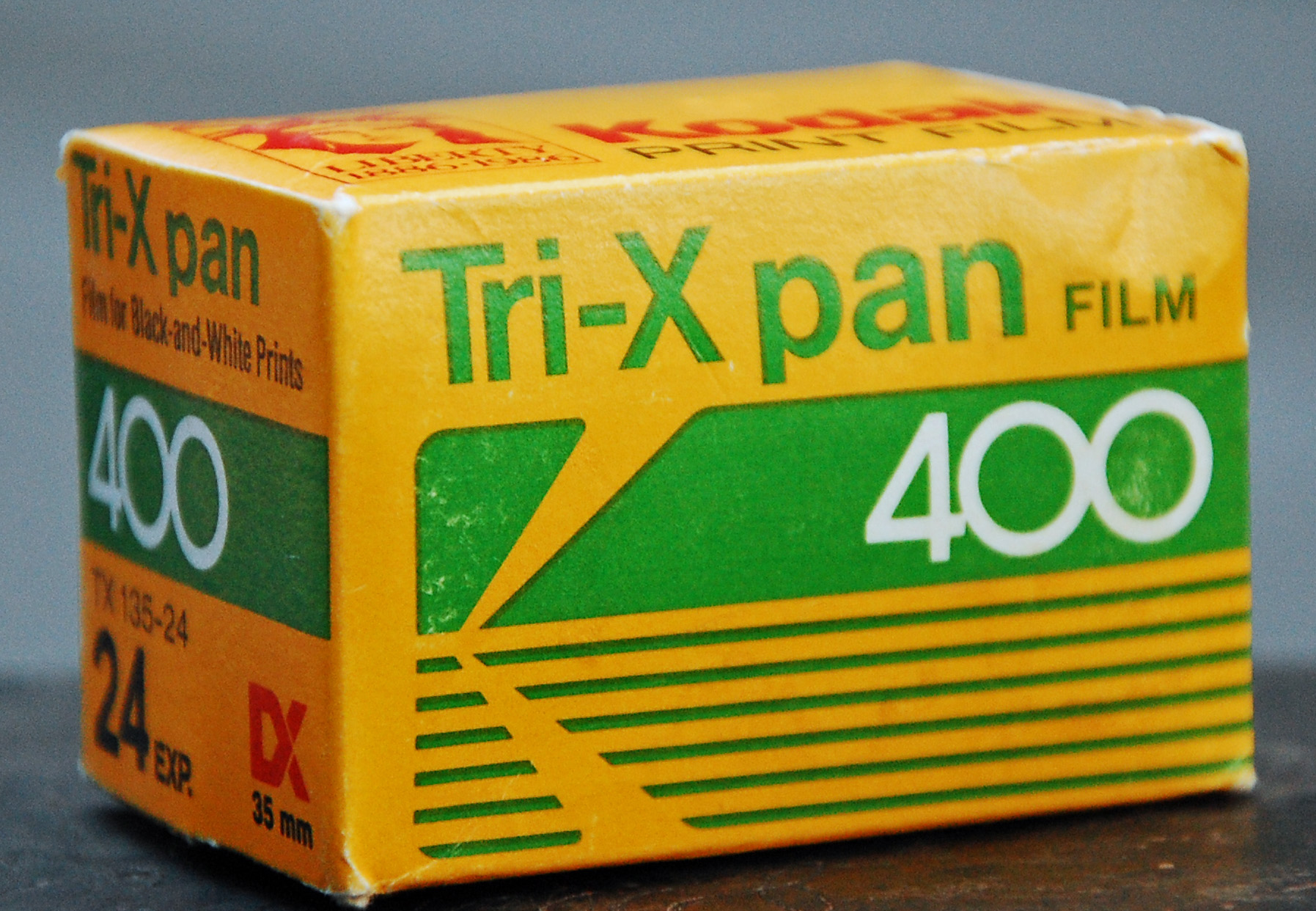
Tri-X box, circa 1986

== See also ==
- Kodak T-MAX
- Ilford HP5
- List of photographic films
- List of discontinued photographic films
