= Mark Perry (English footballer) =

English footballer (born 1978)

Personal information
- Full name: Mark James Perry
- Date of birth: 19 October 1978 (age 48)
- Place of birth: Ealing, London, England
- Positions: Defender; midfielder

Youth career
- Queens Park Rangers

Senior career*
Years	Team	Apps	(Gls)
1995–2002	Queens Park Rangers	66	(1)

Managerial career
- Hayes Gate
- * Club domestic league appearances and goals

Mark James Perry (born 19 October 1978, in Ealing) is an English former professional footballer who played in the Football League for Queens Park Rangers at right back and in midfield.

Perry made his debut for Queens Park Rangers as a 17-year-old in September 1996, in a 3–1 win against Barnsley at Oakwell. He scored from a header on debut, which proved to be the only goal of his senior career. He played 75 games in all competitions before a knee injury forced his retirement at the age of only 23. Perry also played for the England national under-18 football team. He managed Hayes Gate in the Combined Counties Football League.
