= Fatos Lala =

Albanian footballer and futsal player

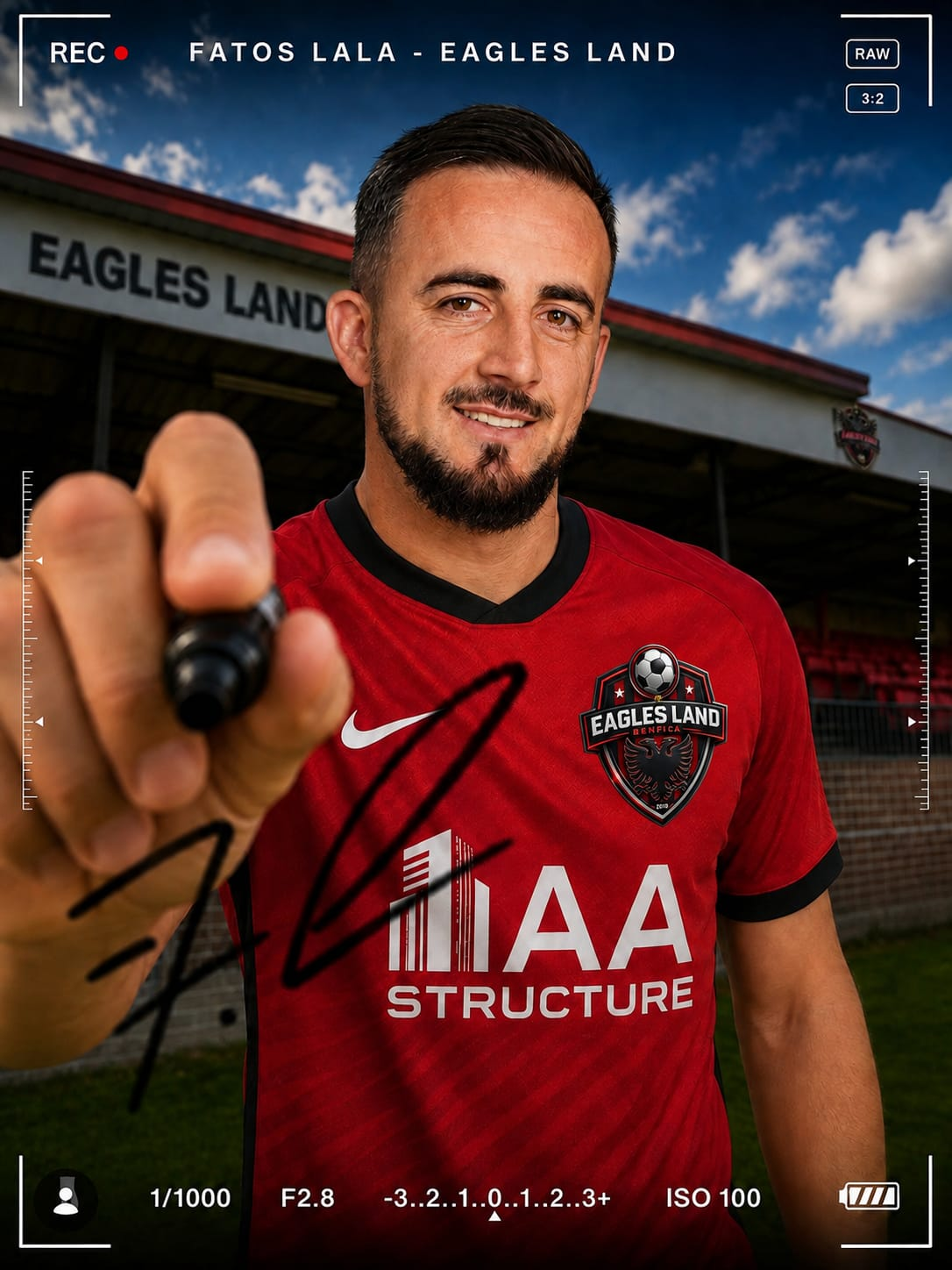
- Lala with Eagles Land Benfica F.C. in 2026

Personal information
- Full name: Fatos Lala
- Date of birth: 8 April 1995 (age 31)
- Place of birth: Kukës, Albania
- Height: 1.80 m (5 ft 11 in)
- Position: Midfielder

Team information
- Current team: Eagles Land Benfica F.C.
- Number: 8

Youth career
- 2005–2011: 22 Marsi
- 2011–2013: Tirana

Senior career*
Years	Team	Apps	(Gls)
2013–2014	Gostima	9	(1)
2014–2015	Kamza	11	(0)
2015–2016	Vora	12	(2)
2016–2018	Kevitan	6	(0)
2018–2019	Tirana (futsal)	15	(4)
2019–2020	Kinostudio	12	(4)
2020–2021	Tirana (futsal)	12	(1)
2021–2023	Dajti	35	(6)
2022–2023	ROAMEL	28	(3)
2023–2024	→ Eagles Land	3	(1)
2026–	Eagles Land Benfica F.C.	0	(0)

International career
	Albania U19	2	(0)
- * Club domestic league appearances and goals as of 24 October 2023

Fatos Lala (born 8 April 1995) is an Albanian footballer and futsal player who plays as a midfielder for Eagles Land Benfica F.C.

== Early life ==
Lala was born in Kukës, Albania, on 8 April 1995. Six months after his birth, his family moved to Tirana, where he was raised.

== Club career ==
=== Early career ===
Lala was born in Kukës in northern Albania near the border with Kosovo, but six months after his birth his family moved to the capital, Tirana. He began playing football with local amateur side 22 Marsi before joining the youth academy of KF Tirana in 2011 at the age of 16.

During the 2011–12 season, Lala represented the club's under-17 side, where he enjoyed an outstanding campaign by scoring 25 goals in 25 appearances. The following season, he was promoted to the under-19 team and successfully adapted to a deeper midfield role, recording 20 goals in 32 appearances during the 2012–13 season.

In the summer of 2013, he left KF Tirana to join FK Gostima in the Albanian Third Division, making his senior debut. His first season was affected by injuries, limiting him to nine league appearances, in which he scored one goal.

In 2014, Lala signed his first professional contract with Albanian First Division side KS Kamza.

=== Senior career ===
In the summer of 2013, Lala began his senior career with FK Gostima, making 9 league appearances and scoring one goal during the 2013–14 season.

In 2014, he signed his first professional contract with KS Kamza, where he made 11 league appearances during the 2014–15 Albanian First Division season.

He later represented KF Vora (2015–2016), KF Kevitan (2016–2018), before switching to futsal with KF Tirana Futsal, where he played between 2018–2020 and again during the 2020–2021 season.

Between 2019 and 2020, Lala also played for Kinos Studio in the Albanian amateur leagues.

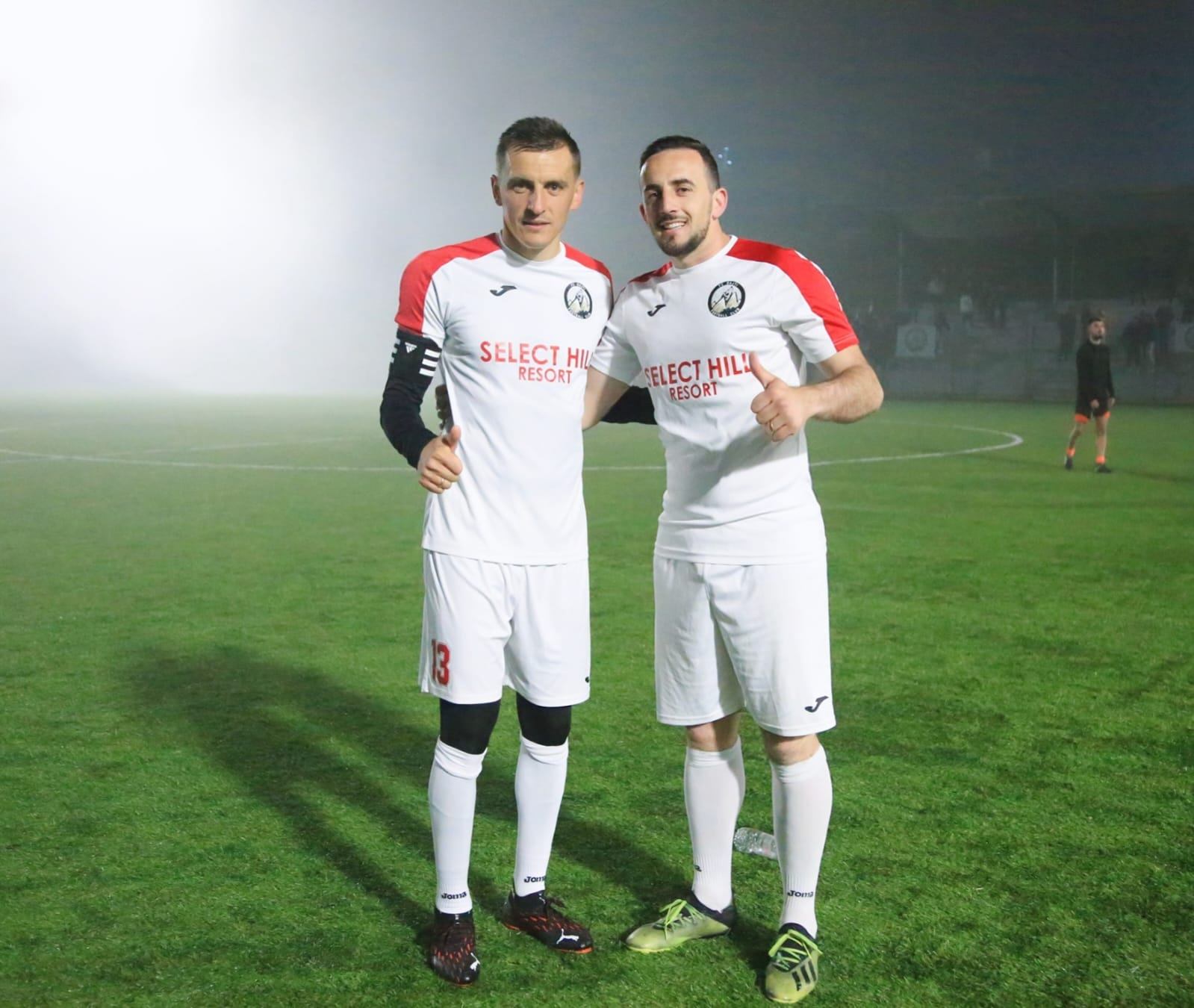

In 2021, he joined FC Dajti, making 35 league appearances and scoring six goals. He later played for ROAMEL during the 2022–2024 seasons, recording 28 appearances and three goals.

In June 2024, Lala suffered an anterior cruciate ligament (ACL) injury which kept him out of competitive football for approximately two years. Following his recovery, he returned to football in June 2026 by signing for Eagles Land Benfica F.C., competing in Division One of the Combined Counties League, Step 6 of the English football pyramid for the 2026–27 season.

== International career ==
Lala represented the Albania U19 national team, earning two caps.

== Career statistics ==
Season	Club	Apps	Goals
2013–14	FK Gostima	9	1
2014–15	KS Kamza	11	0
2015–16	KF Vora	12	2
2016–18	KF Kevitan	6	0
2018–20	KF Tirana Futsal	15	4
2019–20	Kinos Studio	12	4
2020–21	KF Tirana Futsal	12	1
2021–23	FC Dajti	35	6
2022–24	ROAMEL	28	3
2024–26	—	Did not compete (ACL injury)	
2026–	Eagles Land Benfica F.C.	0	0
