= Brentham F.C. =

Association football club in England

- Full name: Brentham Football Club
- Founded: February 1919; 107 years ago
- Ground: Brentham Club
- Manager: Michael Buckley
- League: Middlesex County League Premier Division
- Website: https://www.brenthamclub.co.uk/football

Brentham Football Club is a football club based in Brentham Garden Suburb, Ealing, West London. They are currently members of the Middlesex County League Premier Division and are affiliated to the Middlesex County Football Association.

== History ==
Brentham were founded in February 1901, by a young man Henry Vivian in the Haven Arms in Ealing. The Brentham Institute, as it was originally called, was opened in 1911 and its Football Section formed eight years later. At the end of the 2002–03 season they resigned from the Southern Amateur League and joined Division Three of the Middlesex County League (MCFL). In the club's centenary season, Brentham were sitting on top of the MCFL, six points clear and with their first Premier Division title on the horizon, when Coronavirus intervened and the season ended prematurely in March 2020.

== Ground ==
The club has played at the Brentham Club, Ealing since the club's formation in 1919.

== Honours ==
Southern Amateur League

- Division Two champions: 1948–49, 1972–73

Southern Amateur League

- Division Three champions: 1986–87

Middlesex County League

- Division One West champions: 2015–16
