= 2011–12 Combined Counties Football League =

The 2011–12 Combined Counties Football League season (known as the 2011–12 Cherry Red Records Combined Counties Football League for sponsorship reasons) was the 34th in the history of the Combined Counties Football League, a football competition in England.

== Premier Division ==
Combined Counties Football League Premier Division
- Season: 2011–12
- Champions: Guildford City
- Promoted: Guildford City
- Relegated: Mole Valley SCR; Banstead Athletic
- Matches: 462
- Goals: 1,757 (3.8 per match)

The Premier Division featured three new teams in a league of 22 teams after the promotion of Chertsey Town to the Southern Football League:

- Farnham Town, promoted as runners-up in Division One.
- South Park, promoted as third-placed club in Division One.
- Windsor, newly formed after Windsor & Eton folded.

=== League table ===
Pos	Team	Pld	W	D	L	GF	GA	GD	Pts	Promotion or relegation
1	Guildford City	42	30	7	5	125	51	+74	97	Promoted to the Southern League Division One Central
2	Windsor	42	29	9	4	124	44	+80	96	
3	Hanworth Villa	42	26	6	10	118	55	+63	81 (Note: Hanworth Villa were deducted three points for fielding an ineligible player against Croydon on 6 August.)	
4	Egham Town	42	25	5	12	102	64	+38	80	
5	Molesey	42	24	4	14	103	61	+42	76	
6	Camberley Town	42	22	4	16	107	68	+39	70	
7	Horley Town	42	20	6	16	79	62	+17	66	
8	South Park	42	19	7	16	83	61	+22	64	
9	Raynes Park Vale	42	18	7	17	72	96	−24	61	
10	Wembley	42	16	12	14	66	64	+2	60	
11	Cove	42	16	7	19	84	109	−25	55	
12	Farnham Town	42	13	11	18	66	77	−11	50	
13	Ash United	42	14	7	21	75	82	−7	49	
14	Epsom & Ewell	42	15	9	18	71	77	−6	48 (Note: Epsom & Ewell were deducted six points for fielding an ineligible player against Croydon on 19 November and against Banstead on 27 December. The match between Horley Town and Badshot Lea was awarded to Horley after Badshot Lea were unable to field a team.)	
15	Sandhurst Town	42	15	3	24	64	106	−42	48	
16	Croydon	42	13	8	21	62	80	−18	47	
17	Badshot Lea	42	13	8	21	66	91	−25	47	
18	Dorking	42	13	8	21	55	103	−48	47	
19	Colliers Wood United	42	12	9	21	64	90	−26	45	
20	Chessington & Hook United	42	13	4	25	60	102	−42	43 (Note: Chessington & Hook United reprieved from relegation.)	
21	Mole Valley SCR	42	11	4	27	57	99	−42	37	Relegated to Division One
22	Banstead Athletic	42	9	7	26	54	115	−61	34	Relegated to Division One

Source: fchd.
Rules for classification: 1) points; 2) goal difference; 3) number of goals scored.

== Division One ==
Combined Counties Football League Division One
- Season: 2011–12
- Champions: Guernsey
- Promoted: Guernsey; Bedfont Sports; Hartley Wintney
- Matches: 306
- Goals: 1,199 (3.92 per match)

Division One featured four new teams in a league of 18 teams:

- Bookham, relegated from the Premier Division.
- South Kilburn, transferred from the Hellenic League.
- Spelthorne Sports, promoted as champions of the Surrey Elite Intermediate League.
- Guernsey, a newly formed team, and the first Channel Islands team ever to play in any mainland league.

=== League table ===
Pos	Team	Pld	W	D	L	GF	GA	GD	Pts	Promotion or relegation
1	Guernsey	34	31	1	2	138	22	+116	94	Promoted to the Premier Division
2	Bedfont Sports	34	25	5	4	84	34	+50	80	Promoted to the Premier Division
3	Hartley Wintney	34	23	7	4	99	44	+55	76	Promoted to the Premier Division
4	Warlingham	34	19	7	8	73	50	+23	64	
5	Eversley	34	19	6	9	83	52	+31	63	
6	Staines Lammas	34	18	4	12	70	53	+17	58	
7	Spelthorne Sports	34	16	7	11	75	52	+23	55	
8	Westfield	34	16	4	14	64	65	−1	52	
9	Worcester Park	34	14	7	13	83	75	+8	49	
10	Frimley Green	34	11	7	16	55	82	−27	40	
11	Cobham	34	11	6	17	51	70	−19	39	
12	Knaphill	34	11	5	18	58	81	−23	38	
13	Feltham	34	11	1	22	47	68	−21	34	
14	South Kilburn	34	8	9	17	38	62	−24	33	
15	CB Hounslow United	34	10	2	22	50	82	−32	32	
16	Farleigh Rovers	34	8	6	20	50	84	−34	30	
17	Bookham	34	4	6	24	32	97	−65	18	Relegated to the Surrey Elite Intermediate League
18	Sheerwater	34	3	6	25	49	126	−77	15 (Note: Sheerwater were reprieved from relegation. Bookham accepted relegation to Level 11 of the football pyramid.)	

Source: fchd.
Rules for classification: 1) points; 2) goal difference; 3) number of goals scored.
