= Neasden Foundation F.C. =

Coordinates: 51°32′20.33″N 0°21′17.09″W

Neasden Foundation
- Full name: Neasden Foundation Football Club
- Dissolved: 2008
- Ground: Avenue Park, Neasden
- 2007–08: Combined Counties League; Division One, 14th

Neasden Foundation Football Club were a football club based in Neasden, in the London Borough of Brent, England. In 2007, the club was promoted to the Combined Counties League Division One from the Middlesex County League. However, they failed to complete all their matches and were expelled from the Combined Counties League. The club also had issues with unpaid fines.
