= Bookham F.C. =

Association football club in England

Coordinates: 51.275750°N 0.36917120°W

Bookham
- Full name: Bookham Football Club
- Nickname: The Lions
- Ground: Chrystie Recreation Ground, Great Bookham
- Chairman: Bob Elcome
- League: Guildford & Woking Alliance Division Three
- 2024–25: Guildford & Woking Alliance Division Two, 10th of 10 (relegated)
Home colours

Bookham Football Club is a football club based in Great Bookham, near Leatherhead in Surrey, England. Affiliated to the Surrey County Football Association, they are currently members of the Guildford & Woking Alliance Division Three and play at the Chrystie Recreation Ground.

== History ==
The club was established before World War II. In the 1990s they joined the Surrey South Eastern Combination, winning Division One in 1994–95 to earn promotion to the Surrey County Premier League, which became the Surrey County Senior League in 2000. After finishing fourth in 2002–03 the club were promoted to Division One of the Combined Counties League. They finished in third place in Division One for the next two seasons, and after another third-place finish in 2005–06 the club were promoted to the Premier Division.

The 2010–11 season saw Bookham finish bottom of the Premier Division, resulting in relegation to Division One. They finished second-from-bottom of Division One the following season and dropped into the Surrey Elite Intermediate League. In 2014 they returned to Division One of the Surrey South Eastern Combination, but left the league after finishing second-from-bottom of the division in 2014–15.

In 2016 the club joined Division One of the Guildford & Woking Alliance, winning the division at the first attempt.

== Honours ==
- Surrey South Eastern Combination
  - Division One champions 1994–95
- Guildford & Woking Alliance
  - Division One champions 2016–17

== Records ==
- Best FA Cup performance: Extra preliminary round, 2007–08, 2008–09, 2009–10, 2010–11, 2011–12
- Best FA Vase performance: Second qualifying round, 2007–08, 2008–09, 2009–10, 2010–11, 2011–12
