= Kodak Harrow =

Photographic factory and R&D centre

Coordinates: 51.5945°N 0.3458°W

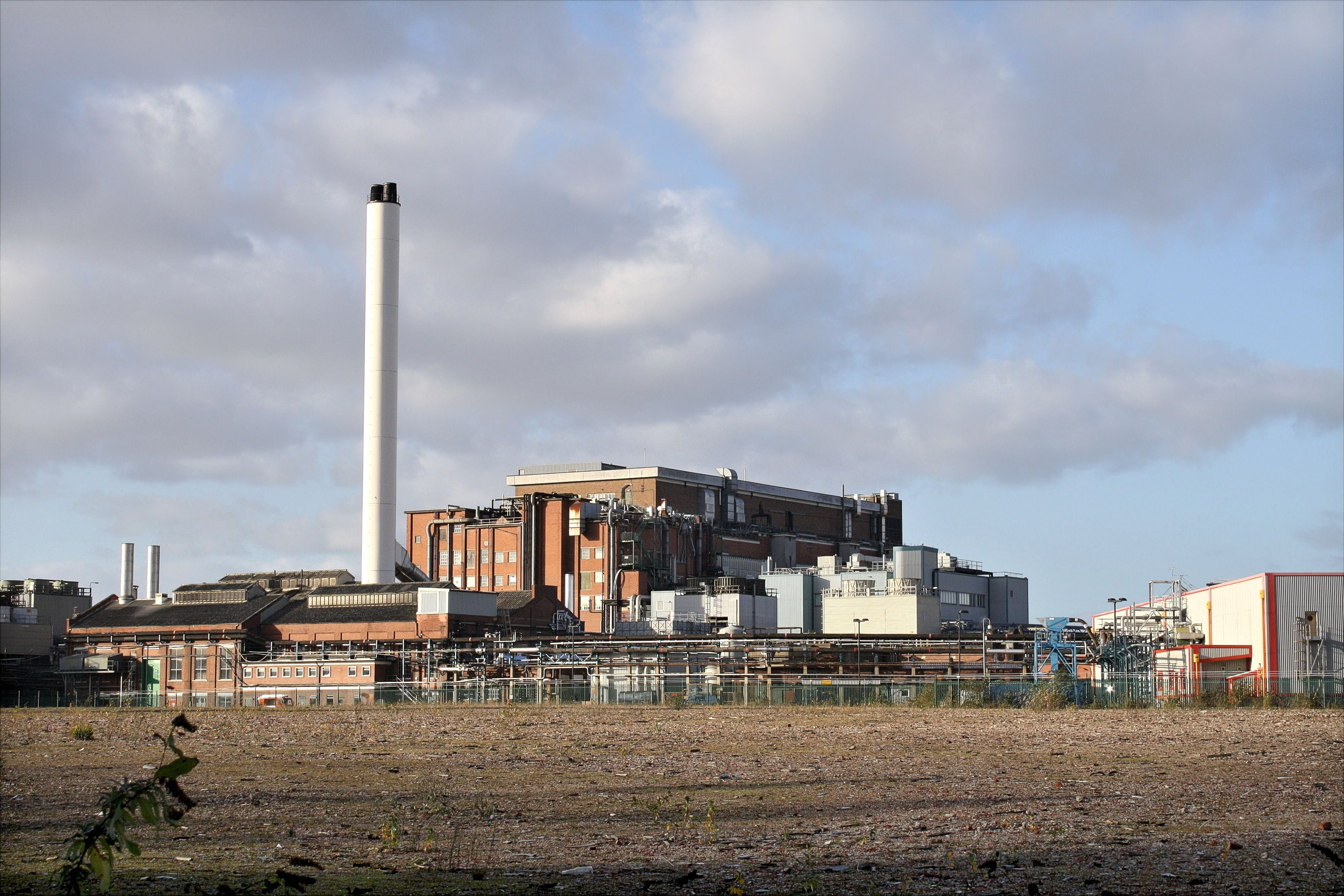
Part of the factory in 2011

The Kodak Works, Harrow was a photographic manufacturing plant and research and development centre on Headstone Drive, Harrow, North West London. Built by the American Kodak company in 1890, it was their largest factory in the United Kingdom and at its peak in the mid-20th century employed up to 6,000 workers. Production of photographic film ended in 2005 and the plant closed its doors in 2016.

== History ==
The factory was built in what was then farmland in the hamlet of Wealdstone in Middlesex, directly to the west of the railway line that stops at nearby Harrow & Wealdstone station. Kodak purchased 7 acres (2.8 ha) of land and the plant opened in 1891, Kodak's first manufacturing facility outside the United States where production was running in Rochester, New York. Initially the factory developed and printed photographs of clients. In the next 20 years the factory expanded. Eventually film rolls and photographic paper were also being produced at the plant.

Added to the factory was a museum, sports facilities, and a research laboratory which worked in parallel and competed with that in Rochester and other international Kodak centres.

At its peak during the 1950s, about 6,000 workers were employed at the site. By then, the facility covered an area of 55 acres (22 ha).

As Kodak was beginning to struggle owing to the growth of digital photography, the commercial feasibility of the Harrow site declined and was being wound down in the 2000s. Some parts of the site were demolished, others were sold or leased. In 2005, film production ended at all Kodak plants in the UK, and in Harrow 600 jobs were lost. Nevertheless 1,400 employees continued to work at Harrow. Harrow was also planned to become Kodak's UK headquarters; however in 2005 it was decided to keep the headquarters in Hemel Hempstead but at a different site.

Following Kodak's bankruptcy in the U.S. in 2012, the future of the site was unclear. The British spin-off Kodak Alaris took control of the site in 2013 and its association with the original American Kodak ended. At this time, Harrow was the global manufacturer of all Kodak colour negative paper.

== Research Laboratory ==
The laboratory at Harrow opened in 1929 and at one point served as Kodak's European research centre. The facility closed in the 2000s.

== Kodak Museum ==
In 1927, a museum was opened at the site. The 1947 published book The Kodak Museum, A Permanent Exhibition Illustrating the History of Photography and Some of its Applications in Science, Art and Industry is an illustrated catalogue of the collection at the Kodak Museum. The museum at Harrow closed in 1985; the items are now at the National Science and Media Museum located in Bradford, West Yorkshire.

The nearby Headstone Manor Museum also has a collection of items relating to the Kodak factory.

== Kodak Sports Ground ==
The sports ground located on the west side of Harrow View and contiguous with Headstone Manor was made for the employees at the plant and included facilities such as tennis courts and rifle ranges. Kodak F.C. was formed in 1935 for workers at the factory. They currently play at Boxtree Park in the Middlesex County Football League.

During the 2000s as Kodak in Harrow downsized, the sports ground was leased. A leisure centre run by Nuffield Health operated at the grounds but it closed in 2011.

== Closure and legacy ==
On 13 April 2016, Kodak Alaris announced that the Harrow facility will close down, citing "drop in demand coming into the factory". By this time only 250 people were working at the site. It finally closed in December 2016.

The site was purchased by developers Barratt and Hyde who planned to build 2,000 new homes along with new facilities. The development is called Eastman Village, paying homage to the founder of Kodak, George Eastman. The 213 feet (65 m) tall chimney of the factory, which has been a local landmark, is being retained.
