= Kodak Alaris =

Photographic supplies company

Kodak Alaris Holdings Limited Kodak Alaris Inc.
- Type: Limited
- Industry: Photography, digital imaging
- Founded: 30 May 2013
- Headquarters: Hemel Hempstead, Hertfordshire, United Kingdom
- Key people: Jon Bostock, CEO
- Products: film, digital imaging software and hardware
- Revenue: ▲US$496 million (2023)
- Owner: Kingswood Capital Management
- Website: www.kodakalaris.com

Kodak Alaris is a British company headquartered in Hemel Hempstead focusing on hardware and software for digital imaging and information management. It was formed in 2013 after the American Eastman Kodak Company (usually known as simply Kodak) spun-off its Document Imaging and Personal Imaging divisions as part of bankruptcy proceedings. Kodak Alaris was involved in sales and marketing of consumer photographic film as well as retail photo kiosks (Kodak Moments) until 2026, evolving into a business-to-business operation.

For more than a decade, Kodak Alaris were the exclusive worldwide wholesale distributor of Kodak film stock developed and manufactured by Kodak in America, handling all logistics and marketing after the film rolled off the assembly line in Rochester, New York. Kodak Alaris was run during this time by the British Kodak Pension Plan. After facing a deficit, it was rescued and taken over by the British state's Pension Protection Fund in 2020.

In 2024, the British government sold Kodak Alaris to an American private equity firm. Kodak took back control to directly distribute and sell its manufactured film stock in 2025 and bypassing Kodak Alaris entirely. In 2026, Kodak Alaris reached an agreement to sell its Kodak Moments retail photo printing kiosks business to German company Cewe Group to focus on enterprise scanners and software. The company continues to use the Kodak name and brand under license with the appended "Alaris".

== Company history ==
In 2012, Kodak filed for bankruptcy after a years-long decline in the company's core film photography business. As part of the bankruptcy, Kodak faced a $2.8 billion claim by the UK Kodak Pension Plan (KPP). The claim was resolved and Kodak Alaris was formed when KPP paid $325 million for Kodak's personalized imaging and document imaging businesses.

In 2014, the company appointed Ralf Gerbershagen as CEO. Also in 2014, Mark Elliott was named chairman of the Board of Kodak Alaris.

In 2015, the company created AI Foundry, which provides business process automation solutions that use artificial intelligence (AI) and imaging science to automate data capture workflows.

In 2016, the company launched Kodak Moments, a visual storytelling app, at the South by Southwest festival. The company closed its only colour paper factory in Harrow, UK, and outsourced all RA-4 paper production to Carestream Health, US, formerly the Eastman Kodak health group, with production at a facility in Windsor, Colorado.

In 2017, the company appointed Marc Jourlait as CEO, completed a balance sheet restructuring, renewed a rotating credit facility, and completed the sale of its manufacturing facility, Kodak Works in Harrow.

In 2018, the company's Information Management division announced that it would begin to operate under the name Alaris.

In 2020, the Paper, Photochemicals, Display, and Software business was sold to Sino Promise, China, which was also a major distributor for Kodak Alaris. This includes Kodak color negative paper, photochemicals (Color process photochemicals for photolabs and B&W retail photo processing chemicals), display substrates (Duratrans, etc.) and printing software businesses. Sino Promise had previously purchased some of the manufacturing assets of Kodak Alaris (formerly Kodak China) and so was already the manufacturer of the color process chemicals and undertook paper finishing. The AI foundry business was also sold to US mortgage company Guaranteed Rate.

On 18 November 2020, Kodak Alaris was formally transferred from KPP to the Board of the Pension Protection Fund (PPF). Thus the ownership of the company came directly under the control of the UK pension protection authority. On 1 April 2022 Paul Wells succeeded Mark Alflatt as CEO. It had revenues of $196m in 2022 and directly employed 700 staff.

On 1 August 2024 Kodak Alaris was sold by the UK PPF to Kingswood Capital Management, a Los Angeles-based private equity firm.

In December 2024, Paul Wells was succeeded as CEO by Jon Bostock.

== Former operations ==
=== Photographic film ===
Kodak Alaris held the rights to the sale, marketing and distribution of Kodak-branded still film products. Film was produced in 35mm, 120, and sheet film formats. Interest in film photography increased in the 2020s, causing a shortage of film worldwide. Manufacturer Eastman Kodak's main business continued to be the production of motion picture and industrial films, where it retained control over the sales and distribution. Additionally, due to shortage of still films, Eastman Kodak motion picture films have also been repackaged for use by still film consumers by third parties such as Flic Film and Cinestill.

While Kodak Alaris were contracted until 2028 to distribute the films, the company's sale to a private equity firm led to a re-negotiation between Eastman Kodak and the new owners to terminate it early. In September 2025 Eastman Kodak began to distribute consumer films directly in US and Canada, coinciding with the launch of revived Kodacolor 100/200 branded films, with professional films following in January 2026 leading to some films being renamed in those markets. On 24 March 2026, Eastman Kodak began directly distributing films in other regions as well, putting an end to 12 years of exclusive stills film distribution operations by Kodak Alaris.

As a result, since 2026 new stock of the Portra and TMAX brands of film (which are trademarks of Kodak Alaris, not Eastman Kodak) are now renamed to Ektacolor and Ektapan respectively and the packaging redesigned to a classic K design, partly to not infringe Kodak Alaris's intellectual property.

Black-and-white negative film

- Kodak Tri-X 320 & 400
- Kodak TMAX 100, 400, & P3200 (Eastman Kodak versions sold as Ektapan)

Color negative film

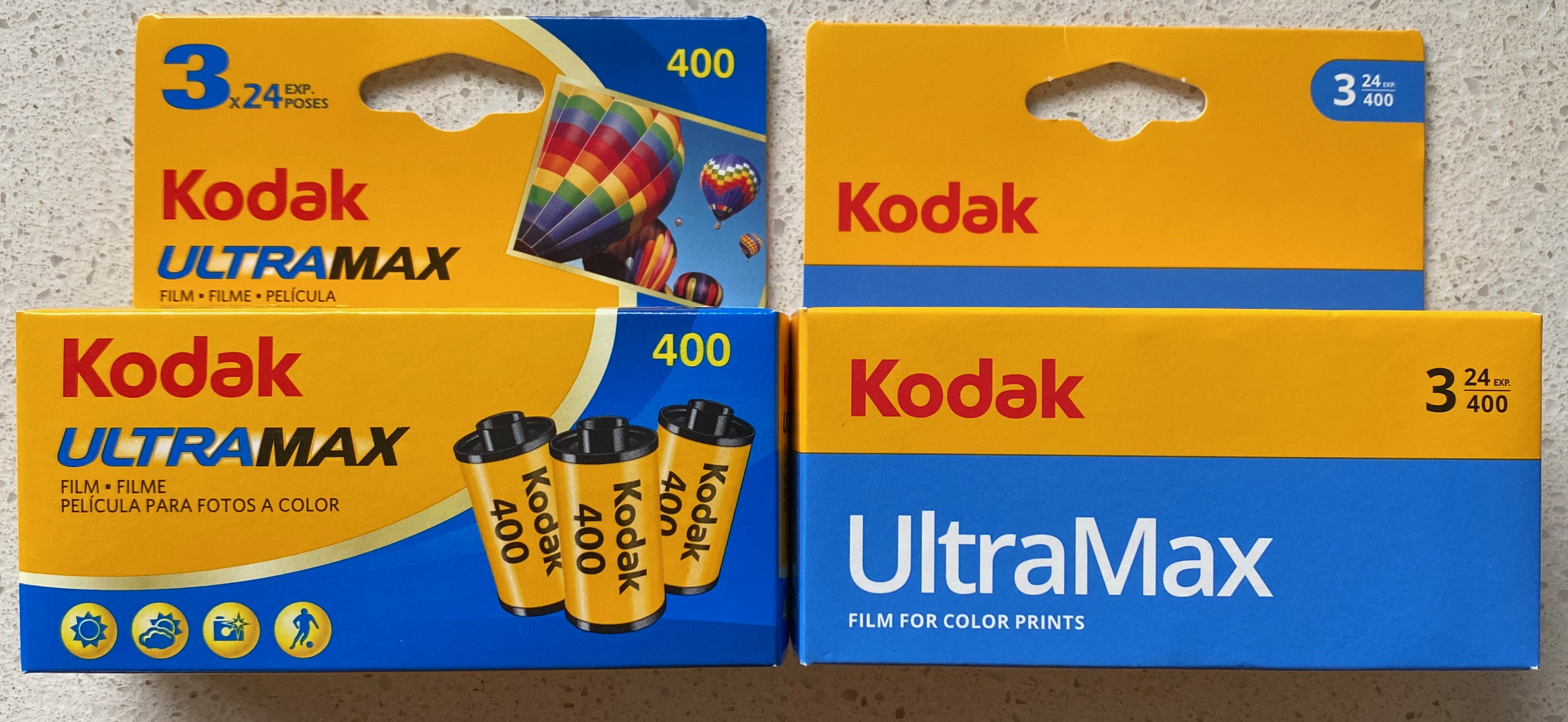
Kodak Ultramax 400 film boxes showing before and after a 2023 package redesign

- Consumer
  - Kodak ProImage 100
  - Kodak ColorPlus 200
  - Kodak Gold 200
  - Kodak Ultramax 400
  - Kodak Ultramax 800 (only sold in single-use cameras)
- Professional
  - Kodak Ektar 100
  - Kodak Portra 160, 400 & 800 (Eastman Kodak version sold as Ektacolor)

Color reversal (slide) film

- Kodak Ektachrome E100

=== Kodak Moments ===
The Kodak Moments business supplies retail self service print kiosks, which enable consumers to make prints of digital images and photo products such as printed mugs, and undertakes the sales and marketing of Kodak still films produced by Eastman Kodak. The kiosk machines are sourced from original manufacturers and assembled for Kodak Alaris by third party integrators located in US and Germany. Machine consumables are manufactured by a Kodak Alaris facility in the US and a third party supplier in Germany. It had revenues of $314m in 2022 and directly employed 480 staff. In August 2026, Kodak Alaris reached an agreement to sell the Kodak Moments business to Cewe Group.

=== PPDS ===
PPDS; Paper, and Processing chemicals, Display and Software sold in 2020 to Sino Promise, China. Sino Promise had previously acquired the Kodak Alaris paper slitting plant in Xiamen, China, in 2015 and the Kodak Alaris photochemical plant in Wuxi, China, in 2012, which produces Flexicolor products for RA-4 and C-41 processes. Paper production had already been outsourced to Carestream Health, US and Kodak B&W chemicals to Tetenal, Germany. Therefore, the sale principally concerned the licensing rights to the Kodak name on these products rather than any production facilities. However, in early 2023, Sino Promise decided to exit the business; this enabled the U.S.-based Photo Systems Inc., who had been a manufacturer of some of the products for Kodak Alaris, to acquire the brand rights directly from Eastman Kodak in September 2023, with the intent to re-introduce the full range of black & white, and C-41, RA-4 and E6 color photochemistry.

=== Others ===
AI Foundry was sold in 2020 to US mortgage company Guaranteed Rate.
