= Middlesex County Football League =

Ninth tier of English league football

- Founded: 1984
- Country: England
- Divisions: 6
- Number of clubs: 73
- Level on pyramid: Level 11 (Premier Division)
- Feeder to: Combined Counties League; Hellenic League
- Promotion to: Combined Counties Football League Division One; Hellenic League Division One; Essex Senior League (instance in 2012)
- Relegation to: Various inc. Hounslow & District Football
- Current champions: London Fennecs (2025–26)
- Most championships: Willesden Constantine (4)
- Website: Official website

The Middlesex County Football League is a football competition based in England loosely drawing teams from the central, northern and western parts of Greater London. The league was founded in 1984 and initially had only one division, although it has since expanded greatly. It currently has a total of six divisions. The Premier Division sits at step 7 (or level 11) of the National League System. It is a feeder to the Combined Counties Football League and the Hellenic Football League. The league is currently sponsored by Cherry Red Books.

== History ==
The Middlesex County League was founded in 1984 as a single division. One year later, the league expanded to include a second division (Division One). In 1991 the league added a third tier, Division Two, which was discontinued during 1996–2002. On its reinstatement a fourth tier was also created (Division Three). For the 2006–07 season the league added a fifth level and the fourth level was regionalised. The divisions were named Division Three East and Division Three West. A further re-organisation in 2007–08 saw growth and the league expanded to six divisions: Division One acquired its split (into East and West), Division Three East was renamed Division Three, whilst Division Three West was renamed Division Three (Hounslow & District). By the end of the 2010–11 season, both Division Threes had been dropped, and the league spent two seasons with four divisions across three levels.

In 2013, a fourth-tier Combination Division was reintroduced below Division Two, and in 2017, a fifth tier, the Jeff Nardin Division, was added. In 2019, Division One was expanded to three divisions and Division Three was reintroduced between Division Two and the Combination, creating eight divisions in all. Division Three was dropped again for 2022–23, restoring the league to seven divisions across five levels. The Combination and the Jeff Nardin Division were merged before the 2025–26 season.

Former members to progress through the pyramid are: Brook House, Hanworth Villa, CB Hounslow United, Rayners Lane, North Greenford United, Sutton Common Rovers, South Kilburn, Neasden Foundation, Bethnal Green United, Bedfont Sports, Hayes Gate, Southall, FC Romania, British Airways, Broadfields United, West Essex, FC Deportivo Galicia, St. Panteleimon, Hilltop and NW London.

In 2021, a mini tournament, the Middlesex Super 6, was organised following the abandonment of the season due to the COVID-19 pandemic, which featured Clapton Community, Cricklewood Wanderers, NW London, Stonewall, Sporting Hackney and AEK London, who won the tournament.

== Member clubs (2026–27) ==
=== Premier Division ===
- Apollo London
- Camden & Islington United
- Camden United
- Explorers
- FH Whistlers
- Harrow United
- Hayes & Hillingdon
- Hayes & Yeading 'B'
- Indian Gymkhana
- Kensington Dragons
- Kodak (Harrow)
- Larkspur Rovers
- LBS Lions
- Sporting Duet
- Stonewall
- Wood Lane

=== Division One Central ===
- Bessingby Park Rangers
- Brent United
- CBHA
- Celtic
- Edgware & Kingsbury Reserves
- Hammersmith & Kensington Town
- Harrow Bhoys
- Harrow United 2nds
- Hilltop Seconds
- Kodak (Harrow) Reserves
- London Albion City
- RF Elite

=== Division One East ===
- Athenians
- Bloomsbury
- Camden & Islington LFS
- FC Marylebone
- FC Starz
- Rose
- Soccer Stars Youth SSA
- Stonewall Reserves
- Westminster & Kensington
- Whitestar

=== Division One West ===
- AFC Southall
- Barnes
- CB Hounslow & Abbots Reserves
- East Sheen
- Hounslow Wolves
- Ickenham
- London Park United
- Ruislip Rangers
- Ruislip Town
- Townmead
- Wiseman West

=== Division Two ===
- Acton Ealing Whistlers
- AFC Heathrow
- CB Hounslow & Abbots 'A'
- FH Whistlers Originals
- Greenford Town
- Hounslow Lions
- London Athletic
- London Tigers
- Old Isleworthians
- Southall Athletic

=== Jeff Nardin Combination ===
- CB Hounslow & Abbots 3rds
- Chiswick Wanderers
- Deep Hearts
- Feltham
- Feltham Town
- Indian Gymkhana Reserves
- Kensington Dragons Blues
- Kodak (Harrow) 3rds
- OHM Sports
- Old Isleworthians Reserves

== Past champions ==
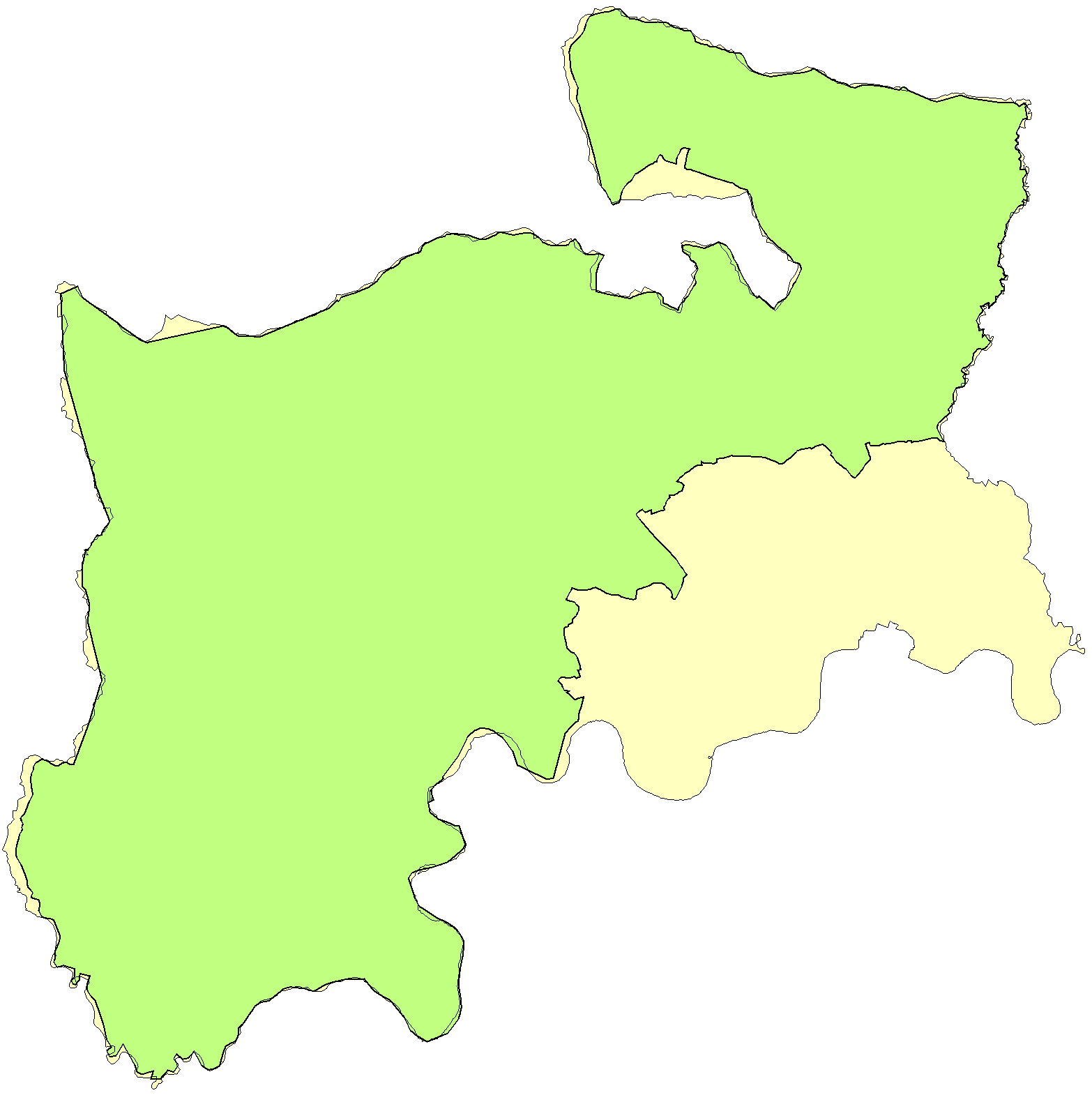
Map of Middlesex 1066–1894. Most of the teams are from these areas, which are mostly in the historic County of Middlesex. Outlying teams forming exceptions are Singh Sabha Slough, Stonewall and historically Sutton Common Rovers

Season	Premier Division
1984–85	Constantine United

Season	Division One	Division Two
1985–86	Mill End Sports	Harrow St. Mary's Reserves
1986–87	Evershed Social	Troy Albion
1987–88	Chorleywood Common	Harefield Town
1988–89	Shamrock	Northfield Rangers
1989–90	Hawkeye Willesden	Brook House Reserves
1990–91	Hawkeye Willesden	Northfield Rangers Reserves

Season	Premier Division	Division One	Division Two
1991–92	Northfield Rangers	Broadwater United	Bridge Park
1992–93	Shamrock	Northolt Saints	Scolar
1993–94	New Hanford	Rayners Lane Reserves	Neasden Foundation Reserves
1994–95	Spelthorne Sports	Willesden Constantine	Southall Reserves
1995–96	Willesden Constantine	Stonebridge Scolar	FC Deportivo Galicia

Season	Premier Division	Senior Division
1996–97	Rayners Lane	Broadfields United
1997–98	Willesden Constantine	Northolt Saints
1998–99	Willesden Constantine	Neasden Foundation
1999–2000	Brook House Reserves	Brentford New Inn
2000–01	Northolt Saints	Pinner Albion Seniors
2001–02	Spelthorne Sports	Stonewall

Season	Premier Division	Division One	Division Two	Division Three
2002–03	Hanworth Villa	Southall Town Reserves	Harefield Ex-Services	Stonewall Reserves
2003–04	Wraysbury	Brazilian	Eastcote	Parkfield Youth Old Boys
2004–05	Hanworth Villa	Neasden Foundation	Parkfield Youth Old Boys	LPOSSA
2005–06	Battersea Ironsides	Sport London e Benfica	Signcraft	Harrow St. Mary's Youth Old Boys

Season	Premier Division	Division One	Division Two	Division Three (East)	Division Three (West)
2006–07	Sport London e Benfica	South Kilburn	London Utd Football Academy	FC Baresi	Brunswick

Season	Premier Division	Division One (Central & East)	Division One (West)	Division Two	Division Three	Division Three (Hounslow & District)
2007–08	Indian Gymkhana	Park View	Kodak Harrow	Harrow St Mary's	Harrow Club	Stedfast United

Season	Premier Division	Division One (Central & East)	Division One (West)	Division Two	Division Three (Hounslow & District)
2008–09	Bethnal Green United	Copland	North Kensington	LPOSSA	Grange Park
2009–10	Interwood	Sporting Hackney	Stedfast United	Imperial College Old Boys	Eutectic
2010–11	Willesden Constantine	West Essex	North Kensington	Pitshanger Dynamo	Belmullet Town

Season	Premier Division	Division One (Central & East)	Division One (West)	Division Two	Combination	Jeff Nardin Division
2011–12	Interwood	Kilburn	FC Assyria	Bay		
2012–13	British Airways	Cricklewood Wanderers	LPOSSA	Stedfast		
2013–14	Sporting Hackney	Pearscroft United	LPOSSA	Heston Bombers	Victoria	
2014–15	Hillingdon	Sloane	New Hanford	Larkspur Rovers	Speedy United	
2015–16	West Essex	Tottenham Hale Rangers	Brentham	Lampton Park	AFC Hanwell & Hayes	
2016–17	FC Deportivo Galicia	AFC United	Lampton Park	PFC Victoria London	Harrow Bhoys	
2017–18	British Airways	St. Panteleimon	PFC Victoria London	Hilltop	Lampton Park Reserves	Speedy United
2018–19	St. Panteleimon	Clapton Community	Hilltop	AFC Hanwell & Hayes	Speedy United	Kodak (Harrow) Reserves

Season	Premier Division	Division One (Central & East)	Division One (North/West)	Division One (South/West)	Division Two	Division Three	Combination	Jeff Nardin Division
2019–20	Season abandoned							
2020–21	Season abandoned							
2021–22	NW London	OIR	Kodak (Harrow)	Shepherd's Bush	Hillingdon Abbots	Whistlers	West London Wanderers	CB Hounslow United 4ths

Season	Premier Division	Division One (Central & East)	Division One (North & West)	Division One (South & West)	Division Two	Combination	Jeff Nardin Division
2022–23	Clapton Community	Camden & Islington United	Hilltop Reserves	Hillingdon	Whistlers	LPFC Old Boys	Kodak (Harrow) 3rds
2023–24	Pitshanger Dynamo	Soccer Stars Fennecs	FC Irish of London	Sport London e Benfica	Portobello	FC Sunbury	Eastcote British Legion
2024–25	Sport London e Benfica	LBS Lions	Wood Lane	Sporting Duet Academy	Eastcote British Legion	LBS Lions Reserves	Sudbury Court

Season	Premier Division	Division One (Central)	Division One (East)	Division One (West)	Division Two	Jeff Nardin Division
2025–26	London Fennecs	FH Whistlers	Apollo London	Explorers	Kodak (Harrow) Reserves	FH Whistlers Originals
