= Push processing =

Film developing technique

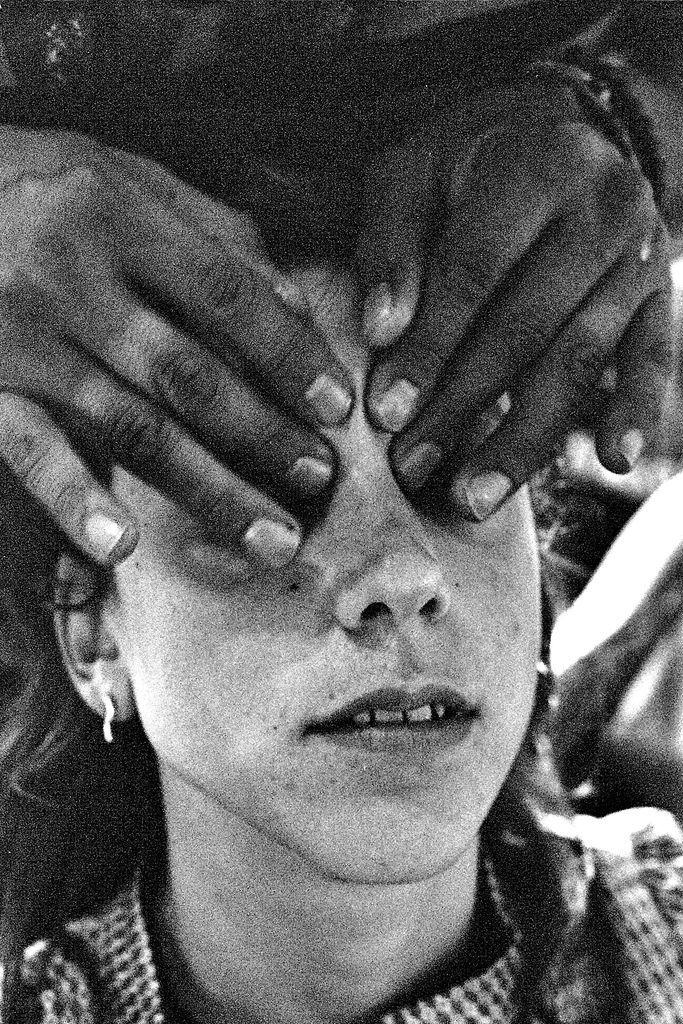
A photograph pushed by 2 stops, showing strong grain

Push processing in photography, sometimes called uprating, refers to a film developing technique that increases the effective sensitivity of the film being processed. Push processing involves developing the film for more time, possibly in combination with a higher temperature, than the manufacturer's recommendations. This technique results in effective overdevelopment of the film, compensating for underexposure in the camera.

== Visual characteristics ==
Push processing allows relatively insensitive films to be used under lighting conditions that would ordinarily be too low for adequate exposure at the required shutter speed and aperture combination. This technique alters the visual characteristics of the film, such as higher contrast, increased grain and lower resolution. For black-and-white film, Kodak states that Tri-X 400 can be underexposed by one stop with normal development, giving only a slight loss of shadow detail in prints, or by two or three stops if development is extended, which increases contrast and graininess and further reduces shadow detail. With colour film, push processing also shifts the colours: Kodak notes that pushing its motion picture colour negative films increases graininess and typically produces higher contrast and a colour bias, with reddish-yellow highlights, cyan-blue shadows and "smoky" shadows in prints. A one-stop push of these films gives an effective speed increase of less than a third of a stop, and Kodak does not recommend push processing as a means of increasing their speed.

Pull processing involves controlled overexposure and underdevelopment, effectively decreasing the sensitivity of the processed film. This technique might be used, for example, with a high-speed film on a bright, sunny day. In processing, it requires some combination of shorter development time and/or at a lower temperature or greater developer dilution. Film that has been pull processed will display the opposite change in visual characteristics; with Kodak's colour negative motion picture films, pull processing gives noticeably finer grain, lower overall contrast and a slight colour bias (yellow shadows and blue highlights), with no perceptible change in sharpness. This may be deliberately exploited for artistic effect.

== Exposure index ==
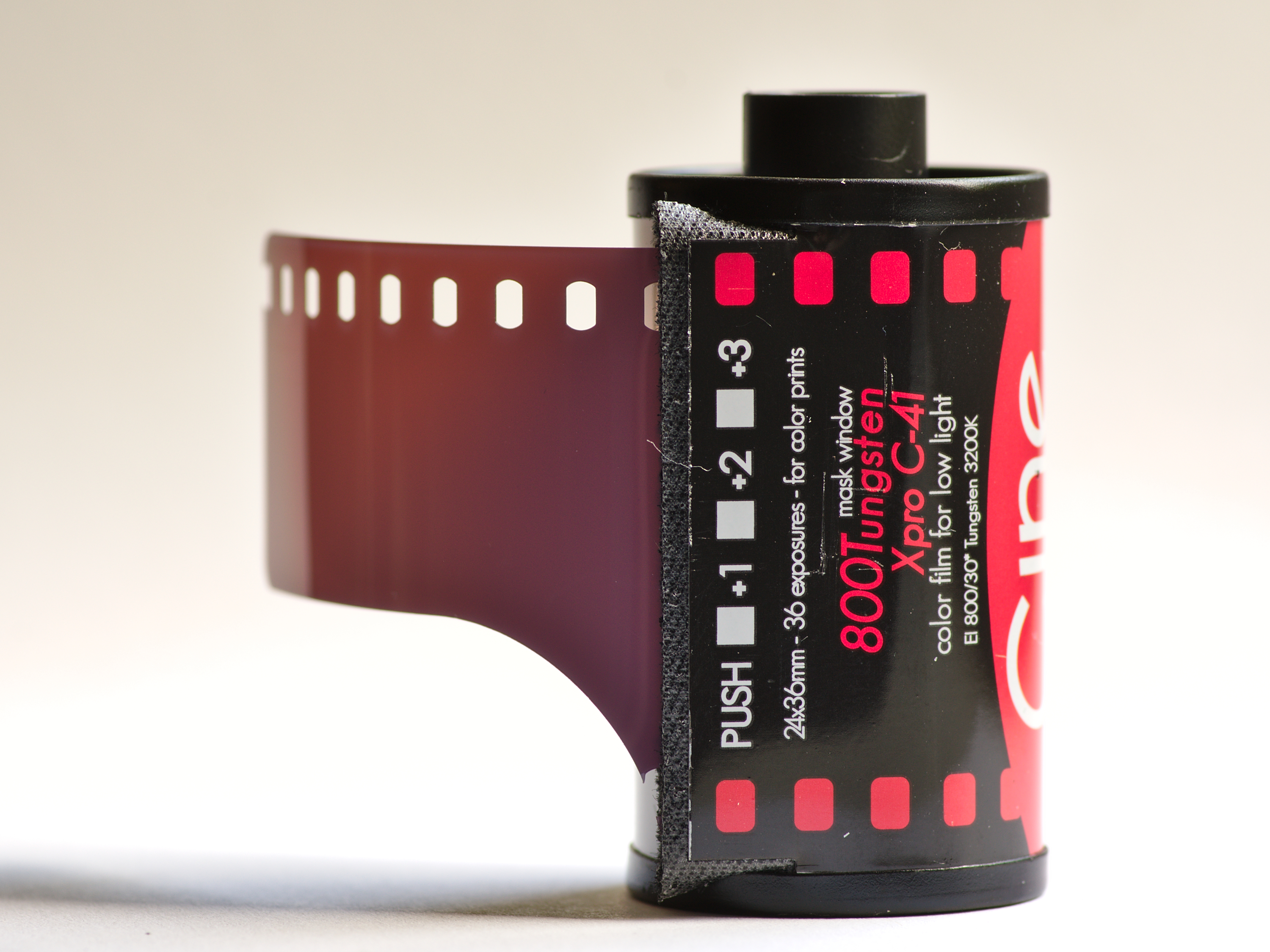
A roll of Cinestill 135 color film showing checkboxes that can be used to remember the EI for push-processing (expressed in stops relative to the box speed of ISO 800/30°).

When a film's effective sensitivity has been varied, the resulting sensitivity is called the exposure index; the film's speed remains at the manufacturer's indication. For example, an ISO 200/24° film could be push processed to EI 400/27° or pull processed to EI 100/21°.

== In cinema ==
In motion picture laboratories, push processing is done by slowing the processing machine so that the film spends longer in the developer. For Kodak's ECN-2 colour negative process, the suggested starting points at 41.1 °C (106 °F) are a developer time of 3 minutes for normal processing, 3 minutes 40 seconds for a one-stop push, 4 minutes 40 seconds for a two-stop push and 2 minutes 30 seconds for a one-stop pull.

Andy Warhol's 1965 8-hour art film Empire was shot on ASA 400 Tri-X 16mm film stock, which was then push processed to ASA 1000 to compensate for the dark conditions of filming the Empire State Building during the night.

John Alcott won an Oscar "for his gorgeous use of natural lighting" in Stanley Kubrick's 1975 period film Barry Lyndon, set in the 18th century, where he succeeded in filming scenes lit only by candlelight through the use of special wide-aperture Carl Zeiss Planar 50mm f/0.7 lenses designed for the low-light shooting on NASA's moon landings, and then push-processing the film stock.

Larry Smith, the cinematographer for Kubrick's 1999 film Eyes Wide Shut, used push-processing to increase the intensity of the color.

Paul Thomas Anderson and Michael Bauman used this technique on their 35mm film stock for the 2017 film Phantom Thread, also filling its frames with "theatrical haze" to "dirty up" the look of the film.

== See also ==
- Film speed
- Latent image
- Photographic processing
