= Pitshanger Dynamo F.C. =

Association football club in England

Coordinates: 51°31′57.08″N 0°19′44.22″W

Pitshanger Dynamo
- Full name: Pitshanger Dynamo Football Club
- Nickname: The Carrots
- Founded: 1972
- Dissolved: 2025
- Ground: Brentham Club

Pitshanger Dynamo Football Club was a football club based in Pitshanger, Ealing, Greater London, England. They played at the Brentham Club in west London.

== History ==
The club was established in 1972. They joined the Middlesex League, becoming members of the Premier Division in 1977. The club finished bottom of the division in 1978–79 and again in 1981–82 and 1982–83. When the Middlesex County League was formed in 1984, Pitshanger were founder members. In 1991 the league was restructured, with Pitshanger relegated to Division Two. However, after finishing as runners-up in Division Two in 1991–92, they were promoted back to the Premier Division.

At the end of the 1996–97 season, Pitshanger left the Middlesex County League. However, they returned to the league in 2010, joining Division Two. The club went on to win Division Two at the first attempt, earning promotion to Division One West. They were Division One West runners-up in 2013–14, and again the following season, after which they were promoted to the Premier Division.

Pitshanger finished bottom of the Premier Division in 2024–25 and folded at the end of the season.

== Honours ==
- Middlesex County League
  - Division Two champions 2010–11

== Records ==
- Best FA Vase performance: First qualifying round, 2017–18
