= South Kilburn F.C. =

Association football club in England

South Kilburn
- Full name: South Kilburn Football Club
- Nickname: The South
- Founded: 2005
- Ground: Vale Farm, Wembley
- Capacity: 2,450 (350 seated)
- Chairman: Dennis Wilcox
- Manager: Mick Jennings
Home colours

South Kilburn Football Club are a football team from Wembley, London.

== History ==
The club was formed in 2005 and joined the Middlesex County Football League for the 2005–06 season.

One season later the club finished as champions of Division One, losing only four games in the season and winning the division by two points. In cup fixtures South Kilburn also had reasonable success losing out 3–2 in the semi-final of the Jim Rogers President's Division One Cup. The club also progressed to round four of the League Cup, and round three in the County FA Junior Cup.

In the 2007–08 season the club made it to the London Junior Cup final, in league competition South Kilburn achieved the runners-up position in the Premier Division, and with that achievement came the opportunity to join the Hellenic League. To be promoted the club had to move from their original home of Broadfields Country Club at Headstone Lane to Vale Farm at Wembley where they implemented ground improvements. The club started its tenure in the Hellenic League but in 2011 made the side ways switch to the neighbouring Combined Counties League Division One and remained in that division until they resigned at the end of the 2013–14 season.

The club withdrew from the Middlesex County League ahead of the 2021–22 season.

== Club honours ==
- Middlesex County Football League Premier Division:
  - Runners-up: 2007–08
- Middlesex County Football League Division One:
  - Winners: 2006–07
- London FA Junior Cup:
  - Runners-up: 2007–08

== Club records ==
- Highest League Position: 6th in Hellenic premier Division 2008–09, 2009–10
- Highest Attendance: 102 vs Guernsey - October 2011

== Ground ==
South Kilburn play their games at Vale Farm Sports Centre, Waford Road, North Wembley, HA0 3HE.
