= Cewe Group =

German printing company

CEWE Stiftung & Co. KGaA
- Trade name: Cewe
- Type: Publicly traded partnership limited by shares (Kommanditgesellschaft auf Aktien)
- Traded as: FWB: CWC; SDAX component
- ISIN: DE0005403901
- Industry: photographic processing
- Founded: 1961
- Headquarters: Oldenburg, Germany
- Area served: Europe, except Finland, Estonia, Latvia, Lithuania, Iceland, Andorra, Monaco, San Marino, Vatican City, Liechtenstein, North Macedonia, Bulgaria, Greece, Moldova, Montenegro, Albania, Bosnia-Herzegovina, Belarus, Russia, Ukraine, Malta and Cyprus
- Products: photography
- Revenue: 864,500,000 (2025)
- Operating income: 88,200,000 (2025)
- Net income: 58,000,000 (2025)
- Total assets: 740,500,000 (2025)
- Number of employees: 3996 (2025)
- Website: https://www.cewe.de

Cewe is a German printing company based in Oldenburg, Lower Saxony. Founded in 1961 it is the largest photo printing company in Europe with its main source of the revenue now the digital printing of photos, photo books and calendars.

In addition to the company headquarters in Oldenburg, Cewe has production sites in Germany in Mönchengladbach, Eschbach near Freiburg and Germering near Munich. In other European countries, Cewe has locations in the Czech Republic (Prague), France (Rennes, Montpellier), Poland (Kędzierzyn-Koźle in Upper Silesia), Romania (Bucharest), Hungary (Budapest) and the United Kingdom (Warwick).

== History ==
On 1 May 1912, August Friedrich Carl Wöltje founded a "Photographic Institute" in Oldenburg. From 1924, he expanded his business to include the sale of cameras and accessories. His son-in-law Heinz Neumüller joined the company as managing partner.

In 1950, Carl Wöltje opened a colour laboratory, supplying several hundred photo shops. Heinz Neumüller and his wife Sigrid, Carl Wöltje’s daughter, founded Cewe Color in Oldenburg in 1961, named after Carl Wöltje’s initials (CW: German pronunciation: [ˈtseːvə]).

Cewe built a photo laboratory in 1964 on a 50,000 m^{2} site in Oldenburg-Kreyenbrück. In 1971, the company began operations in the Netherlands. In 1973, Cewe merged with "Vereinigte Color" in Hamburg and Bremen and changed its name to "Vereinigte Cewe Color Betriebe". In the second half of the 1970s and early 1980s, Cewe took over additional laboratories in Germany and abroad.

From 1986, new facilities opened in Mönchengladbach, Paris, Berlin and Worms. In 1989, Cewe introduced the Eurocombi bag for storing photo orders. In 1992, the group was restructured as Cewe Color Holding AG and, in 1993, was listed on the Frankfurt Stock Exchange. Cewe later expanded into France, Scandinavia and Central Europe.

In the 1990s, Cewe developed the Photo Index, a miniature print of all images on a film roll, delivered with the developed photos and negatives to simplify reorders. In 1995, the company installed its first digital image transfer station in a photo shop. From 1997, it was also possible to order digital photos online. In 2001, Cewe introduced an in-store terminal that transferred digital photos directly to CD.

In the course of the analogue-digital transformation, several large Cewe photo laboratories across Germany had to be closed between the late 1990s and early 2000s.

By the early 2000s, printing photos from negatives had largely disappeared. In 2005, the company introduced the Cewe photo book. In 2007, the number of digital images developed (1.515 billion) exceeded the number of photos developed from film (1.277 billion) for the first time. The following year, Cewe acquired the Münster-based company Diron, which later became Viaprinto, a commercial online printing company.

The company was listed on the SDAX until 15 June 2007 and was readmitted to the SDAX on 4 March 2009. Cewe was also listed on the Lower Saxony stock index Nisax20.

In 2007, a conflict arose between Cewe’s management and the shareholder M2 Capital Management AG, a Swiss private equity company. M2 Capital demanded a substantial increase in the dividend, which, according to Cewe’s executive board and several major shareholders, would have jeopardised the company’s restructuring and long-term orientation. The investment funds involved in M2 Capital accused Cewe’s executive and supervisory boards of failure and called for the management’s resignation. The attempt was unsuccessful. Sebastian Freitag, owner of the investment bank Freitag & Co., who advised the two hedge funds M2 Capital and K Capital and represented their interests on Cewe’s supervisory board, resigned on 8 February 2007. Six years after the conflict, Cewe changed its legal form from a public limited company (Cewe Color Holding AG) to a Stiftung & Co. KGaA, thereby reducing the shareholders’ ability to exert influence.

In February 2012, Cewe acquired Saxoprint GmbH in Dresden and introduced a smartphone app that could be used to order the company's photo products. The company went on to acquire the French photo app firm Cheerz in 2016, the online printing company Laserline in 2017, and Whitewall Media GmbH in April 2019.

In March 2022, the board of trustees of the Neumüller Cewe Color Foundation announced it would not renew CEO Christian Friege’s contract beyond December 2022, citing differing views on corporate management as the reason. At the end of April 2022, it became known that a descendant of the company’s founder, who is a member of the Neumüller Cewe Color Foundation, had made use of a special provision under which Christian Friege was to remain on the company’s executive board. However, he subsequently declined the appointment, and Yvonne Rostock was appointed as the new chief executive officer. On 1 May 2025, Thomas Mehls succeeded Yvonne Rostock.

== Corporate structure ==
Cewe Stiftung & Co. KGaA is the parent company of the Cewe Group. The Neumüller Cewe Color Foundation is the personally liable partner of Cewe Stiftung & Co. KGaA. The foundation is represented by the Executive Board, which in turn is appointed by the Foundation Board of Trustees. The Neumüller family's community of heirs is represented on the board of trustees. In the 2025 financial year, the group generated sales of €864.5 million and the Cewe Stiftung & Co. KGaA employed an average of 3996 people.

In 2024, the Cewe Group had subsidiaries in 21 European countries and had 27 sales offices. In addition to its headquarters in Oldenburg, the group has production sites in Mönchengladbach, Eschbach near Freiburg, Germering near Munich, Frechen near Cologne and Bad Kreuznach in Germany. Outside Germany, Cewe has production sites in the Czech Republic (Prague), France (Paris, Rennes, Montpellier), Poland (Koźle), Hungary (Budapest) and the United Kingdom (Warwick).

The Cewe Group owns the following subsidiaries:

- Cheerz
- Pixum
- Whitewall
- DeinDesign

Shareholder structure (as of 2025):

- Cewe Stiftung & Co. KGaA: 6.3%
- Neumüller Family: 27.1%
- Lazard Frères Gestion SAS: 3.2%
- Lazard Small Caps Euro: 3%
- Free float: 60.4%

== Products ==
Cewe operates in the field of photo finishing, which includes the production and marketing of photo products. Cewe originally began with services and products based on analogue film, but later evolved to generate its main revenue from the production of digital images, photo books and other photo products. In 2025, Cewe sold over 6.32 million photo books and printed around 2.6 billion photos.

The retail division, which is primarily present in Eastern Europe and Scandinavia, offers hardware products such as cameras and camera accessories.

=== Distribution channels ===
Depending on the brand, the Cewe Group uses an omnichannel model, which includes physical stores, online shops, mobile apps and photo stations.

Cewe carries out photo processing for retail chains and drug stores through points of sale and instant photo stations, as well as by postal delivery. Retail partners include chains such as Boots.

== Bibliography ==
- Meyer, Lioba; Ahlers, Rolf, eds. (2012). "Das Gedächtnis der Stadt: Fotografiegeschichte in Oldenburg ; [aus Anlass der gleichnamigen Ausstellung im Stadtmuseum Oldenburg vom 15. September bis 25. November 2012]".Veröffentlichungen des Stadtmuseums Oldenburg. Oldenburg: Isensee-Verl. ISBN 978-3-89995-908-6.
- Blome-Drees, Johannes; Rang, Reiner. (2009) "Die Aktivitäten von Finanzinvestoren in Deutschland am Beispiel der Cewe Color AG" . Düsseldorf, Hans Böckler Stiftung. (PDF)

Cewe erhält Großauftrag aus Großbritannien Der Fotodienstleister Cewe bleibt auf Erfolgskurs. Christian Friege, Chef des SDax-Unternehmens, baut das Geschäft im Ausland nun kräftig aus.
