= Eagles Land Benfica F.C. =

Association football club in England

Coordinates: 51.6703°N 0.6242°W

Eagles Land Benfica
- Full name: Eagles Land Benfica Football Club
- Founded: 15 May 1981
- Ground: Preston Park, Harefield
- Capacity: 1,200 (150 seated)
- Owner(s): Admir Xheviti & Leonis Jaupaj
- Chairman: Admir Xheviti
- Manager: Ricky Nelson
- League: Combined Counties League Division One
- 2025–26: Combined Counties League Division One, 15th of 23
- Website: https://www.eagleslandfc.co.uk
Home colours	Away colours

Eagles Land Benfica Football Club is a football club based in London, England. They are currently members of the Combined Counties League Division One and play at Preston Park in Harefield.

== History ==
=== Sport London e Benfica ===
Founded on 15 May 1981, the club joined the Camden Sunday League, where they remained until joining the Chiswick & District League in 1986. In 1990 they joined the Marathon Sunday League, going on to win Division Three in 1995–96 and Division Two in 1997–98. After finishing as runners-up in Division One in 1998–99, the club were promoted to the Premier Division. In 2000 they became members of the Hayes & District Sunday League, winning the Premier Division in 2002–03. The following season they won the league's Premier Cup and President Cup.

In 2005 Sport London e Benfica switched from Sunday league football to Saturday football, joining Division One of the Middlesex County Football League. The club won the division at the first attempt, earning promotion to the Premier Division. The following season the club won the Premier Division, earning promotion to Division One of the Spartan South Midlands League. In 2007–08 the club finished eighth in Division One. The following season they dropped to eighteenth place, and played in the FA Vase for the first time, reaching the second round. In 2009–10 they finished twentieth in a 21-club division. During the following season the club's groundshare with Hanwell Town ended and they moved to Haringey Borough's Coles Park in Tottenham. As a result, the club resigned from the league midway through the season.

Sport London e Benfica continued to run youth teams, also creating a futsal team that entered the Middlesex FA Futsal fives, which they went won in consecutive seasons. They subsequently re-entered the Middlesex County League in 2017, joining Division Two. However, after finishing second-from-bottom in the division in 2017–18, they were relegated to the Saturday Combination. In 2022–23 the club won the Middlesex County Junior Trophy (defeating CB Hounslow United's third team 6–0 in the final) and the Jeff Nardin & Combination Cup, beating LPFC Old Boys 3–1 in the final. However, the club played a suspended player in the Jeff Nardin & Combination Cup final, resulting in the cup being awarded to LPFC Old Boys. The season also saw them finish as runners-up in the Saturday Combination, earning promotion to Division One South & West. In 2023–24 the club secured back-to-back promotions by winning the Division One South & West title resulting in promotion to the Premier Division, as well as winning the Jim Rogers President's Division One Cup (beating London Cheetahs 4–1 in the final) and the Middlesex County Junior Cup (beating Norseman 5–1 in the final).

In 2024–25 Sport London e Benfica were champions of the Middlesex County League Premier Division, earning promotion to Division One of the Combined Counties League.

=== Eagles Land Benfica ===
In 2026 the club was renamed Eagles Land Benfica.

== Ground ==
In the 2022–23 and 2023–24 the club played at Springwest Academy in London. In 2024 the club relocated to Spratleys Meadow in Amersham (the home ground of Amersham Town, although the reserve and youth teams remained at the Springwest Academy. When the club was renamed Eagles Land Benfica, they moved to Preston Park in Harefield, groundsharing with Harefield United.

== Club officials ==
Position	Name
Chairman	(Albania) Admir Xheviti
Finance Director	(Albania) Leonis Jaupaj
Sporting Director	(England) Dave Tuttle
Media Director	(Albania) Fatos Lala
Manager	(Cape Verde) Ricky Nelson
Assistant Manager	(Portugal) Miguel Santos
Head Coach	(Albania) Ajet Shehu
Goalkeeping Coach	(Kosovo) Drilon Ajeti
First-Team Physio	(England) Jacob Bolaji

== Honours ==
- Middlesex County League
  - Premier Division champions 2006–07, 2024–25
  - Division One champions 2005–06
  - Division One South & West champions 2023–24
  - Jim Rogers President's Division One Cup winners 2023–24
- Middlesex County Junior Cup
  - Winners 2023–24
- Middlesex County Junior Trophy
  - Winners 2022–23
- Hayes & District Sunday League
  - Premier Division champions 2002–03
  - Premier Cup winners 2003–04
  - President's Cup winners 2003–04
- Marathon Sunday League
  - Division Two champions 1997–98
  - Division Three champions 1995–96

== Records ==
- Best FA Vase performance: Second round, 2008–09
