= KF Gostima =

Albanian football club

- Full name: Klubi i Futbollit Gostima
- Founded: 2001; 24 years ago
- Ground: Fusha Sportive Gostimë
- League: Kategoria e Tretë, Group B
- 2015–16: Kategoria e Tretë, Group B, 6th
Home colours	Away colours

KF Gostima were an Albanian professional football club based in Gostimë, Elbasan. They last competed in Kategoria e Tretë during the 2015–16 season and finished 6th in Group B.
