= Sheet film =

Large and medium format photographic film

Sheet film is large format and medium format photographic film supplied on individual sheets of acetate or polyester film base rather than rolls. Sheet film was initially supplied as an alternative to glass plates. The most popular size measures 100 mm × 130 mm (4 in × 5 in); smaller and larger sizes including the gigantic 510 mm × 610 mm (20 in × 24 in) have been made and many are still available today.

== Using sheet film ==
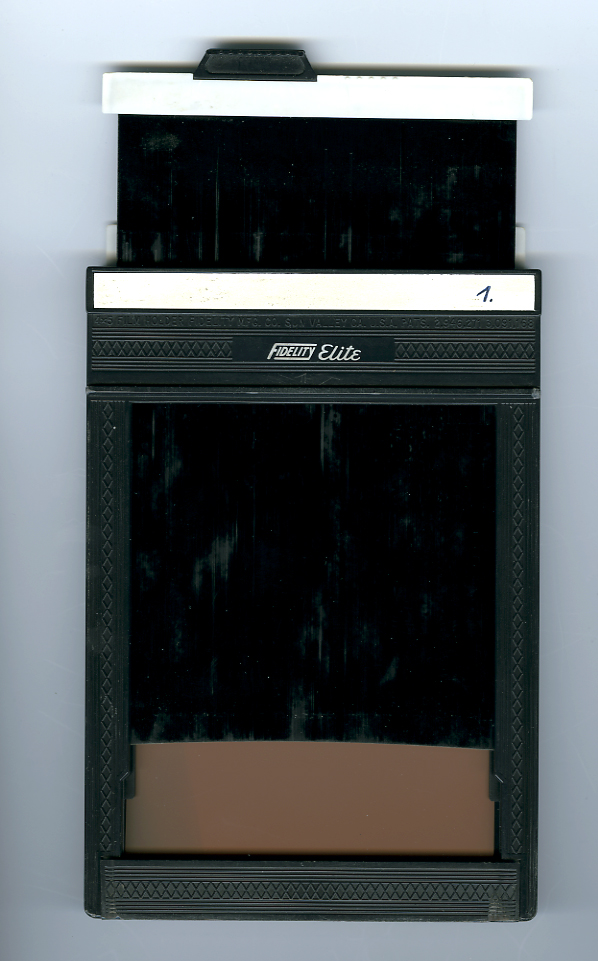
Holder with a sheet of color film (for demonstration only—ambient light would ruin film)

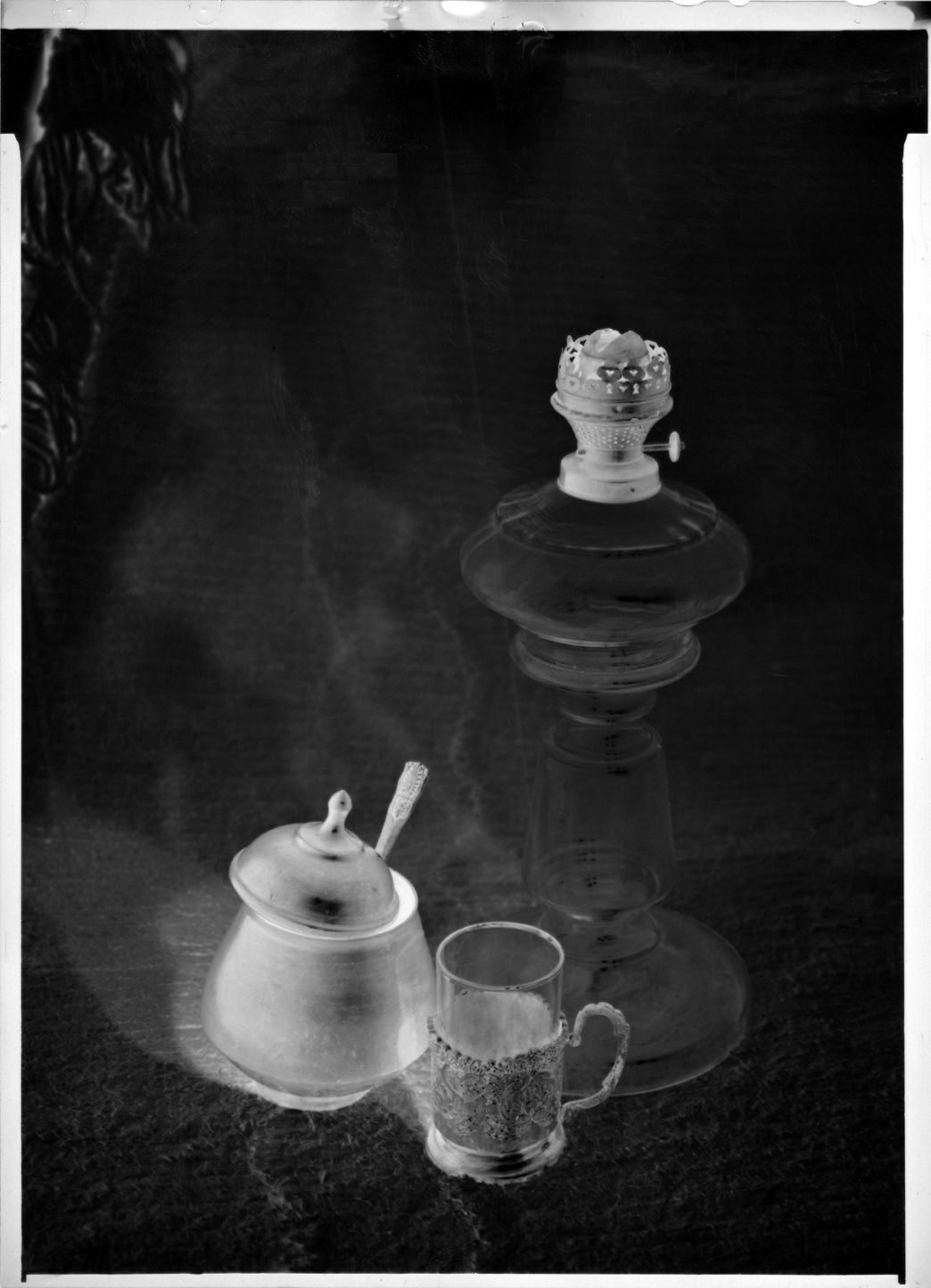
Developed Ilford FP4 13x18 Negative

To use sheet film, the photographer places a sheet of film, emulsion side out, into a film holder in the dark, and closes the dark slide over the loaded film. Next, the holder is inserted into a large-format camera, and the dark slide is removed from the holder. The exposure is made, the dark slide is replaced, and the film holder is removed from the camera.

== Notches ==
Sheet films have notches cut into one short side. This makes it simple to determine which side is the emulsion, when the film is hidden from sight (in the darkroom, or inside a changing bag). When holding the sheet in "portrait" orientation (short side up), with the notches in the upper right, the emulsion side is facing the photographer. The notch patterns vary in size and layout; each type of film has its own distinct pattern, commonly referred to as a notch code, to enable film type identification.

== Developing sheet film ==
Many photographers who use large-format cameras and sheet film do their own film processing. Some more professionally oriented photographic labs will process color negative and positive sheet film, but the "corner drug store" photolab generally cannot. There are multiple methods that can be used.

=== Tray processing ===
The simplest method for processing sheet film is using trays. The equipment, one darkroom tray per processing solution, is easily available and inexpensive compared to most of the other methods. There is also a much lower volume of solution required when using trays - only what is needed to cover the films (though most film development chemicals have minimum solution-volume-per-film-area requirements, which may require use of more solution). The films are placed into the chemical-filled trays one every few seconds, and a stack of films is formed. Agitation is performed by "shuffling" the films; the sheet on the bottom of the stack is brought to the top and pushed down into the solution. The photographer shuffles through the stack at the same rate that they introduced the films into the processing chemical. With careful counting and practiced hands, a photographer can process as many as 10 sheets of film at one time.

Some metal multi-sheet film frames are available for handling multiple sheets as one; they require larger trays than the stacking methods, and generally preclude any stacking for risk of film damage.

The drawbacks of tray processing are that the photographer must spend the entirety of the processing time in the dark, with their hands in the various chemicals (some wear gloves, but they can reduce the ability to feel the individual sheets of film). Some photographers also have problems with scratching of the film's emulsion when using this method.

=== Tank processing ===
Tank processing is also referred to as "deep tank" processing or "dip and dunk" processing. The equipment requirements are greater than for tray processing; a tank for each processing solution is required, along with film hangers for each sheet of film the photographer wishes to process. A film hanger is a metal frame with perforated edges which holds a single sheet or multiple sheets (usually four) of film. The films are inserted into the film hangers, and then submerged into the tank. Agitation is performed by lifting the hangers out of the tank, tilting them to one side to allow them to drain for a brief moment, resubmerging them, lifting and tilting to the other side, and resubmerging. Many photographers will bang or tap the hangers on the tank's top after the second tilt, to dislodge any air bubbles that have stuck to the film.

Tanks are also helpful for long development techniques such as "stand" development. Stand development is very individualized, and every practitioner has his or her own routine, but in general, after an initial agitation in the developer, film is simply allowed to stand motionless in (generally highly dilute) developer, with no agitation, for very long intervals, up to hours.

Large tank processing has higher equipment requirements, and a larger volume of solution is required for each step. A tank for 100 mm × 130 mm (4 in × 5 in) film can require 2 litres (64 ounces) of chemistry, and most tanks for 200 mm × 250 mm (8 in × 10 in) film require from 4 L (1 US gal; 0.9 imp gal) to 13 L (3.4 US gal; 2.9 imp gal). Many large tanks come with floating lids to reduce possible oxidation of solution. Also, despite such large chemical volumes, some tanks do not allow very many films to be processed at a single time; generally six to ten or so. However, film hangers that hold four sheets of film when used in larger tanks can process many sheets of film at the same time. Tank processing, like using trays, must also be performed in the dark. Some photographers report uneven development using this method.

There are also daylight tanks accepting sheet film, usually adjustable to multiple existing sheet formats - e. g. inch and metric, and allowing the processing the sheet film in daylight. They have to be loaded in the dark, though. The stainless steel Nikor tank accepts up to 12 sheets of film, 4x5" size maximum, and requires about 1 liter of chemistry. These tanks have long been discontinued, and are only available used. Some people report uneven development and emulsion scratching with this device (a result of steel "spider" presence, separating the sheets in tank's "cage" ), but many users get excellent results with it - the right loading and infrequent agitation are perhaps the keys to success. The current make plastic Combi-Plan tank accepts up to 6 sheets of film, and works nicely, though the overall quality of manufacture is not too high, and the tank has a number of small plastic details, easy to break or lose. But this tank is also quite capable of excellent performance. Currently {2025} there is also another tank/s in production, by Tim Klein, under the brand name STEARMAN Press; www.stearmanpress.com; in 8x10 inch and 4x5inch formats, model sp445 & SP810 respectively, they can hold 'unusual' formats, like 9x12 cm or 6x9 sheet film (linhof Technika 70); but need some 'ad-hock' gluing of plastic to the holders to customise the fit, but act similar to the plastic tanks of Patterson brand, but designed flat, a capped vent and spout, with baffles keeps light out, and works similarly there are small separate parts inside the tank which can separate and be lost; but the convenience of pour in and out in the daylight is a blessing, esp. for beginners in this, not having to go 'all in' to darkroom to use the tanks, a simple bathroom will suffice.

=== Rotary tube processing ===
With rotary processing, films are loaded into tubes for processing. The solutions are poured or pumped into the tubes, which are turned on their sides and spun, sometimes by hand, and sometimes by a motorized base or machine. The simplest form of rotary processing is to use one tube per film; no extra reel or complex film-holding device is needed. The film is loaded, solution added, tube closed, and the tube is spun, by hand, floating in a water bath. The direction of spin is normally reversed after a couple of spins. Some rotary tubes utilize reels to hold multiple films inside the tube.

Some rotary systems use a motor to do the spinning, instead of the photographer. These systems sometimes have variable rotation speeds, and will reverse direction automatically. Systems such as these are quite convenient; they require nothing of the photographer other than changing the solution at the appropriate time. Some more complex systems can even do the chemistry management, requiring nothing but a simple programming step.

Benefits of rotary systems are even development, and very low solution requirements in some cases. However, they can also require the use of more chemistry than normally needed when only a couple sheets are processed in a tube that has the capacity to hold more sheets because the a minimum amount of chemistry is required for the tube to work properly. Processing can be accomplished with the lights on with almost all rotary tube processing systems because they have light-tight covers. The photographer can also generally keep his/her hands free of chemistry, since the solutions are enclosed in the tubes. Also, since many rotary systems have or use a water bath, the bath can be temperature-controlled, resulting in very consistent results across different processing runs.

Drawbacks with a one-film-per-tube method is that processing any amount of film can take a very long time; it is difficult to keep up with more than one or two tubes at a time. Also, a mechanized rotary system, depending on its features and capabilities, can be very expensive.

== Benefits ==
Sheet film is, simply enough, big, and as such has a proportionately great ability to hold information. The image on a 200 mm × 250 mm (8 in × 10 in) piece of sheet film has approximately fifty-six times the surface area of a standard 35mm image. As compared to megapixels, when taking the LP/mm resolution of 8x10 Velvia the resolution is up to a value of 5,285 megapixels. In theory, the "enlargability" of such an image is proportionately great although the very high image quality of small format lenses sometimes allows somewhat greater magnifications than some large format lenses. However, this is not always the case. Sheet film can be enlarged to poster, or even billboard, size with acceptable quality. It is far easier to do retouching directly on the surface of a sheet of film since the images are large, than on smaller formats. Many of the larger formats can be contact printed, and for some ultra-large formats, are only contact printed.

Each sheet can receive individualized processing. Since each exposure is its own sheet, it is possible to alter development, based on the contrast of the photographed scene, to best fit the dynamic range of the subject. Because of this, many large-format photographers are also practitioners of the Zone System.

Because of the large size and very manual single-use nature of sheet films, it is possible to use a single sheet for more than one exposure. Using a dark slide which has been cut in half, turning a standard format into a long, skinny panoramic format is simple and very cost effective. While the holder is in the camera, the photographer removes the complete dark slide and inserts the half slide, then makes an exposure on half the sheet. The half dark slide is flipped over, and the other half of the film is available for a second shot. The practice originated with photographers taking pictures of groups of banquet attendees, giving these "banquet" formats their name. 100 mm × 250 mm, 180 mm × 430 mm, 200 mm × 510 mm and 300 mm × 510 mm (4 in × 10 in, 7 in × 17 in, 8 in × 20 in and 12 in × 20 in) are the most commonly used of these formats. However, specialized large format banquet cameras were often used for this purpose. They rotated on a stand while exposing the film in a pass from one edge to the other. Jokesters often took advantage of this by getting on the end of the line of people being photographed and then running behind the group of people and standing on the other end of the line so that they show up on both ends of the resulting picture.

== Availability ==
Despite the advancement of digital imaging, the market for sheet film is still healthy and thriving. As of August 2023, Eastman Kodak and Fujifilm manufacture black-and-white, color negative and color transparency sheet films. Ilford and Foma manufacture black-and-white negative sheet films (Efke, in Croatia, ceased production in June, 2012).

== Handling and film holders ==
For more complete information, see the film holder article

Most large format film is used double filmholders which, as the name implies, hold one sheet of film on each side of the holder. The holders must be loaded and unloaded in the dark to protect film from premature exposure.

Some 100 mm × 130 mm (4 in × 5 in) films were previously available in single-shot, pre-loaded, disposable envelopes which can be conveniently loaded into a special film holder in daylight (Kodak Readyload and Fuji Quickload). Each manufacturer made a film holder for its system's envelopes; the Polaroid 545/545i instant film holders also worked with both systems' films. In addition to eliminating dust problems, these daylight-loading systems reduced the amount of gear a photographer needed to carry to only a single film holder. However, as of 2014, no manufacturer offers quick-loading envelopes.

There were several devices manufactured which held several (6-10) sheets of film in individual holders stacked like a pack of cards, and which then shuffled the front holder to the back of the unit after exposure. These devices included the Graflex Grafmatic, Graflex Film Magazine, Burke & James Kinematic, and Fuji QuickChange devices. They were very popular with photojournalists who often had to take several shots in rapid succession.

In the mid-20th century, some sheet film sizes, including medium format, were made in "film packs" of 12 to 16 exposures, which are thin sheets of film and folded into a rectangular pack which was placed in a pack holder camera back.

Some large format cameras have rotating or sliding reduction backs, which mask off part of the film sheet, allowing several smaller photos to be placed on a single sheet of film.

== See also ==
- View camera
- Film format
- Speed Graphic
