= CineStill =

American photographic film company

CineStill Inc.
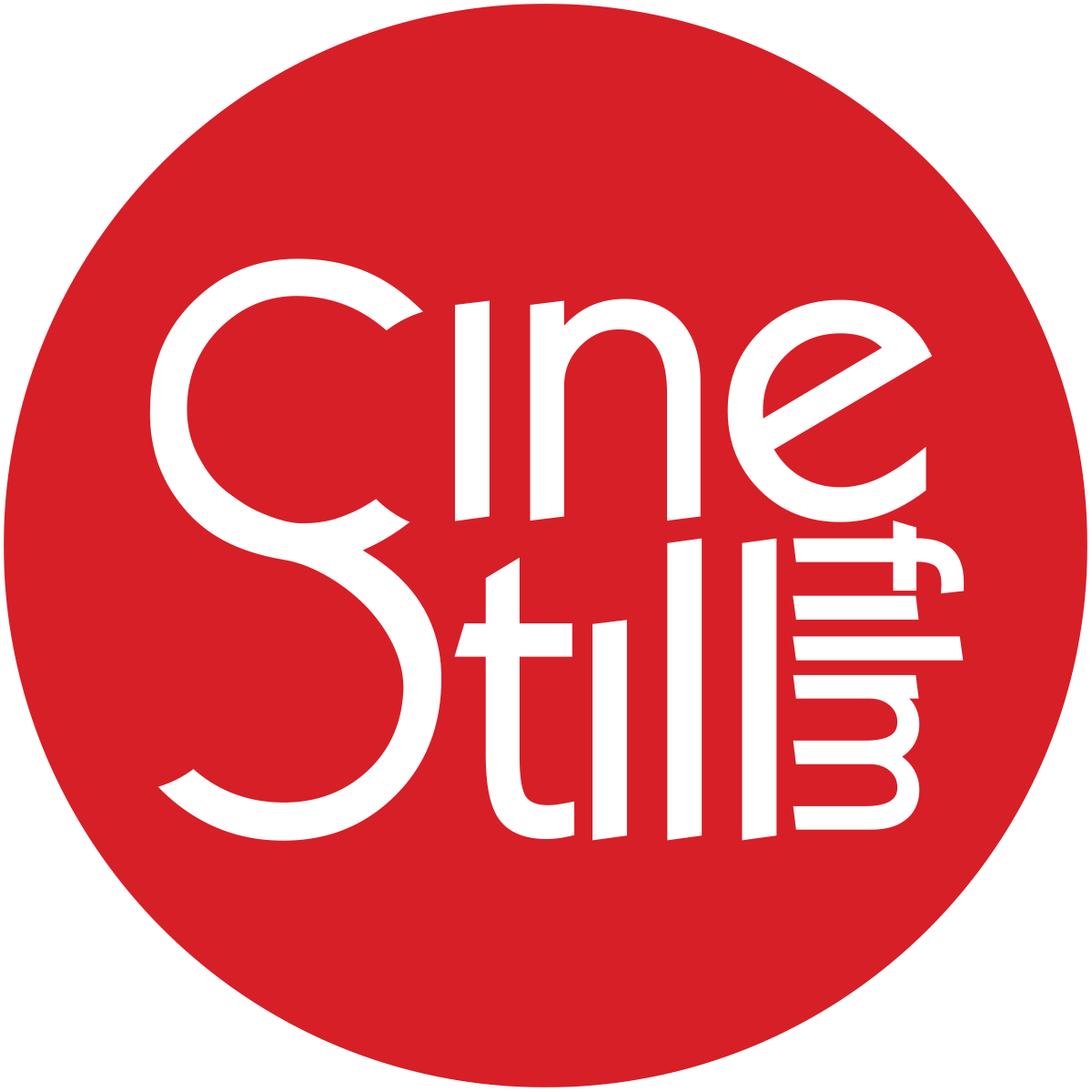
- CineStill logo
- Founded: 2012
- Founders: Brian Wright and Brandon Wright
- Headquarters: Los Angeles, California, United States
- Products: Photographic film and film-processing chemicals
- Website: cinestillfilm.com

CineStill Inc., usually styled as CineStill, is an American photographic film company based in Los Angeles, California. The company was founded in 2012 by twin brothers Brian and Brandon Wright. They became known for adapting motion-picture film so that it could be used in still cameras and processed by ordinary photographic laboratories.

CineStill sells color and black-and-white negative film in several formats, along with chemicals and equipment for developing film. Its best-known products include 50Daylight and 800Tungsten. These films are based on Kodak motion-picture stocks, but they do not have the rem-jet backing found on the cinema versions.

== History ==
Before starting CineStill, the Wright brothers worked in still photography and cinematography. The company was born out of experimentation with cameras, lenses and different ways of processing film. This led them to develop a method of preparing motion-picture film for still cameras and allowing it to be processed using standard still-photography equipment.

CineStill says that beta testing of its 800Tungsten film began in late 2012. The film was commercially released as 800T in 2013. Early products were mainly sold as 35 mm film, although the company later released products in 120 and sheet-film formats.

== Film products ==
Kodak Vision3 50D 5203 and Vision3 500T 5219 are motion-picture films that normally have a black rem-jet layer on the back. This layer serves anti-halation, antistatic and protective purposes. CineStill's 50D and 800T films do not include this backing, which means they can be developed by commercial laboratories using the C-41 process.

Removing the rem-jet layer can cause visible halation, often seen as a red glow around bright or overexposed lights. CineStill recommends C-41 development for its color-negative films, although the company says they can also be processed through all stages of ECN-2. Doing this produces a negative with lower gamma than C-41 processing.

50Daylight, also called 50D, is an EI 50 daylight-balanced color-negative film based on Kodak Vision3 50D 5203. It is balanced for lighting at about 5500 K. CineStill states that it can be exposed between EI 12 and EI 100 without changing normal development. The film is sold in 35 mm and 120 formats.

400Dynamic, or 400D, is an ISO 400 daylight-balanced color-negative film. CineStill announced it in March 2022 and introduced it through a crowdfunding campaign for 35 mm and 120 production. By April 2022, the campaign had raised about US$680,000 and funded versions in 35 mm, 120 and 4×5-inch formats. The 4×5 version was first made for campaign supporters and became a regular product in April 2024.

800Tungsten, generally called 800T, is a tungsten-balanced color-negative film based on Kodak Vision3 500T 5219. Kodak rates the original 5219 film at EI 500 under 3200 K tungsten lighting, while CineStill recommends exposing 800T at EI 800 when it is developed in C-41 chemistry. It was CineStill's first commercially sold film and is available in 35 mm and 120. The 35 mm cartridges are DX-coded.

RedRum was a limited-edition redscale film released in October 2021. It was rated at ISO 200, sold only in 120 format and used CineStill's 800T emulsion. The film was wound in reverse, so photographs were exposed through the film base before reaching the emulsion.

CineStill's main black-and-white film is BwXX. It is a panchromatic negative film based on Eastman Kodak Double-X 5222 motion-picture stock. CineStill rates it at EI 250 in daylight and EI 200 under tungsten lighting. BwXX was originally sold in 35 mm, and a 120 version was introduced in May 2021.

== Film-processing chemicals ==
The company also sells chemical kits intended for people developing film at home. These include Df96, a black-and-white monobath; Cs41, a C-41 kit; Cs6, an E-6 slide-film kit; and Cs2, a reduced-bath ECN-2 kit.

== Controversy ==
In 2023, CineStill faced criticism over its enforcement of a United States trademark for the name "800T". The company contacted Reflx Lab and retailers selling its products about the use of "800T" in product names and listings. Reflx Lab later changed the name of its tungsten-balanced film from "Reflx Lab 800T" to "Reflx Lab 800".

Some people who received messages from CineStill described them as legal threats. Critics argued that "800T" was mainly a descriptive abbreviation meaning ISO 800 tungsten-balanced film. CineStill said it had not sued Reflx Lab, CatLABS or other sellers. It also said that it was not claiming the number "800", the word "tungsten" or the letter "T" by themselves, but was trying to prevent confusion involving the combined "800T" trademark.
