= Hayes Gate F.C. =

Hayes Gate
- Full name: Hayes Gate Football Club
- Nickname(s): The Gate
- Founded: 2006
- Dissolved: 2011
- Ground: Springfield Road, Hayes
- Capacity: 1,000
- Chairman: Nicky Russell
- Manager: Mark Perry
- League: Combined Counties
- 2010–11: Combined Counties League; Division One, 12th (resigned)
Home colours

Hayes Gate Football Club was a football club based in Hayes, Greater London, England.

== History ==
Hayes Gate F.C. was founded in 2006 from the former Technicolor Sports & Social Club. It was privately brought and after substantial investment from the new owners it obtained the FA Charter status and in 2009 they became members of the Combined Counties Football League finishing in the top 10 of Division One.

Despite a 12th-placed finish, the club resigned from the Combined Counties Football League Division One at the end of the 2010–11.
