= Four Marks F.C. =

Association football club in England

- Full name: Four Marks Football Club
- Founded: 1921
- Ground: Upland Lane
- Chairman: Nick Spencer
- Manager: Brian Ford
- League: Farnham & District League
- Website: https://fourmarksfc.com/
Home colours	Away colours

Four Marks F.C. are a long running amateur football club based in Four Marks, a small village and civil parish located 7 miles south west of Alton in the east district of Hampshire, England.

The club are affiliated to the Hampshire Football Association and are members of the Farnham & District League.

== History ==
Four Marks were founded in 1921 and joined the Basingstoke & District League the following year. They remained here until the late Seventies when a successful spell saw them progress on to the North Hants League for a spell.

In 1986, they joined the Aldershot & District League and began steadily climbing back up the divisions. The early nineties saw the club become a strong force within the competition, and in 1994 they won promotion to the Hampshire League Division 3. Here, they held their own with a series of mid-table final placings until being relegated in 1999.

Back in the Aldershot League, Four Marks gradually rebuilt and after enjoying success they returned to county soccer in 2006. During their absence, the landscape had changed considerably and they joined the Hampshire League 2004, finishing a creditable third and fifth in their first two seasons.

They remained a steady force in the competition, which in 2013 then became Division 1 of the Hampshire Premier League. In 2017, Four Marks won the title, and finishing runners-up the following year but on both occasions were denied promotion due to ground grading.

This led to the club leaving the competition, once again returning to the Aldershot League. Since 2025, Four Marks have been members of the Farnham & District League.

== Honours ==
- Hampshire Football Association
  - Junior 'A' Cup Finalists 1989–90
  - Junior 'B' Cup Finalists 1988–89
- Hampshire Premier League
  - Division 1 Champions 2016–17, Runners-up 2017-18
- Aldershot & District League
  - Senior Division Runners-up 1993–94
  - Division 1 Runners-up 1990–91, 2002–03 and 2021–22
  - Division 2 Champions 1989–90, Runners-up 2001–02
  - Division 3 Champions 2006-07 (Reserves)
  - Division 4 Champions 1988–89
  - League Cup Winners 1989–90, Finalists 1986-87 and 1988–89
- Aldershot Football Association
  - Intermediate Cup Winners 2016-17
  - Junior Challenge Cup Winners 2000–01, Finalists 2021–22
- Basingstoke & District League
  - Division 3 Champions 1967-68

== County League record ==
Season	Division	Position	Significant events
1994-95	Hampshire League Division 3	11/18	
1995-96	Hampshire League Division 3	14/18	
1996-97	Hampshire League Division 3	13/20	
1997-98	Hampshire League Division 3	12/16	
1998-99	Hampshire League Division 3	18/19	Relegated
1999-2006	-	-	
2006–07	Hampshire League 2004	3/16	
2007–08	Hampshire League 2004	5/14	
2008–09	Hampshire League 2004	14/15	
2009–10	Hampshire League 2004	8/13	
2010–11	Hampshire League 2004	13/17	
2011–12	Hampshire League 2004	8/13	
2012–13	Hampshire League 2004	8/10	Competition absorbed by the Hampshire Premier League
2013–14	Hampshire Premier League Division 1	8/11	
2014–15	Hampshire Premier League Division 1	4/11	
2015–16	Hampshire Premier League Division 1	3/10	
2016–17	Hampshire Premier League Division 1	1/9	Champions but not promoted
2017–18	Hampshire Premier League Division 1	2/8	Left competition

== Ground ==
Four Marks F.C. play at the Recreation Ground, Upland Lane, Shoe Lane, Four Marks, Hampshire, GU34 5AF.

The venue is owned by Four Marks Parish Council. It is shared with the cricket and tennis clubs, although the football pitch is located in an enclosed corner - a short walking distance from the pavilion and car park.

== Local rivalries ==
Four Marks have a number of local rivals including Alton, Alresford Town and Ropley.
