= North Hants League =

North Hants Senior League
- Founded: 1968
- Folded: 2004
- Country: England
- Feeder to: Hampshire League
- Relegation to: Basingstoke & District League; Andover & District League; Winchester & District League
- Domestic cup: Hampshire Intermediate Cup; Local FA Cups

The North Hants Senior League was a football competition based in Hampshire, England and was administered by the North Hants FA.

== History ==
The League was founded in 1968, by the North Hants FA, to bridge the gap between the Hampshire League and its three local Junior leagues; the Basingstoke & District League and the Andover & District League and the Winchester & District League.

During its heyday, the competition was much respected and for a spell (1973-81) ran with two 14 team divisions. The league consisted mainly of village sides and of the reserve teams of many Hampshire League clubs. Like many other leagues at this level, it lost many teams during the late Nineties/early millennium, when leagues higher up expanded - mainly by introducing Combination Divisions for their reserve sides.

After a further decline in numbers, the competition folded in 2004 following the expansion of the Wessex League and the consequent formation of the Hampshire League 2004.

Prior to this, it had been hoped that eligible clubs in the area would re-join the North Hants League rather than the new unofficial county league and swell numbers, but it was not to be and a valuable stepping stone between junior and county football had been lost.

Efforts were later made to revive the competition but were unsuccessful due to the worrying to decline in grassroots football which has since seen both the Winchester and Andover Leagues also fold.

== League champions ==
Season	Champions
1968/69	Overton United
1969/70	Overton United
1970/71	Winchester Castle
1971/72	Odiham Town
1972/73	Odiham Town
1973/74	Pegasus
1974/75	Pegasus
1975/76	New Street
1976/77	Enham Alamien
1977/78	Worthies Sports
1978/79	Malshanger
1979/80	
1980/81	ABP (Associated Book Publishers)
1981/82	Ecchinswell
1982/83	
1983/84	Basing Rovers
1984/85	R.A.P.C. Worthy Down
1985/86	Burgchlere
1986/87	Soldiers Return
1987/88	Stockbridge
1988/89	Hannington United
1989/90	Broughton
1990/91	AFC Aldermaston
1991/92	Whitchurch United Reserves
1992/93	Ludgershall Sports
1993/94	Tadley
1994/95	Sherborne St John
1995/96	George (AFC Basingstoke)
1996/97	
1997/98	Hadleigh
1998/99	Micheldever
1999/00	Alresford Town
2000/01	Headley Athletic
2001/02	
2002/03	Winchester City 'A'
2003/04	Upham

== A to Z of clubs ==
Letter	Club
A	Abbotts Ann
	ABC United
	ABP (Associated Book Publishers)
	AFC Aldermaston
	Alresford Town
	Andover Reserves
	Andover United
	Apland
B	Basing Rovers
	Battery
	Basingstoke Hospital
	Basingstoke Town 'A'
	Beechwood
	Broughton
	Burghclere
C	Camrose Social
	Charlton Royal
	Compton
D	Dent & Hellyer
E	Ecchinswell
	Enham Alamien
F	Four Marks
G	George (latterly AFC Basingstoke)
	Griffin Arms
H	Hadleigh
	Hannington United
	Headley Athletic
K	King Alfred Youth
	King's Somborne
L	LPHE Sports
	Lilly's SC
	Ludgershall Sports
M	Malshanger
	Merlin
	Micheldever
N	New Street
	North Warnborough United
O	Odiham Town
	Old Symondians
	Overton United
P	Pegasus
	Portals Athletic Reserves
R	Ramsdell United
	Rising Sun (Winchester)
	Ropley
	Rotherick Green
	R.A.P.C. Worthy Down
S	Sherfield
	Shipton Bellinger
	Soldiers Return
	South View
	Southampton Arms
	Sporting
	Stockbridge
	Sutton Scotney
T	Tadley
	Thornycroft Athletic Reserves
U	Upham
V	Vernham Dean
W	Whitchurch United Reserves
	Winchester Castle
	Winchester City Reserves
	Winchester Civil Service
	Worthies Sports
