= 2016–17 FA Youth Cup =

Tournament details
- Country: England; Wales
- Teams: 501

Final positions
- Champions: Chelsea (8th Title)
- Runners-up: Manchester City (7th Runner Up Finish)

Tournament statistics
- Top goal scorer: (Germany) Lukas Nmecha Manchester City (11 Goals)

The 2016–17 FA Youth Cup was the 65th edition of the FA Youth Cup. The defending champions were Chelsea and they retained the trophy for the fourth year in a row after a 6–2 aggregate victory over Manchester City in the final.

== Calendar ==
| Round | Matches played from | Matches | Clubs | New entries |
|---|---|---|---|---|
| Preliminary round | 30 August 2016 | 145 | 501 → 356 | 290 |
| First round qualifying | 14 September 2016 | 121 | 356 → 235 | 97 |
| Second round qualifying | 3 October 2016 | 72 | 235 → 163 | 23 |
| Third round qualifying | 17 October 2016 | 36 | 163 → 127 | |
| First round | 27 October 2016 | 42 | 127 → 85 | 48 |
| Second round | 14 November 2016 | 21 | 85 → 64 | |
| Third round | 22 November 2016 | 32 | 64 → 32 | 43 |
| Fourth round | 6 January 2017 | 16 | 32 → 16 | |
| Fifth round | 25 January 2017 | 8 | 16 → 8 | |
| Quarter-finals | 15 February 2017 | 4 | 8 → 4 | |
| Semi-finals (two legs) | 10 March/18 March 2017 | 4 | 4 → 2 | |
| Final (two legs) | 18 April/26 April 2017 | 2 | 2 → 1 | |

== Qualifying rounds ==
=== Preliminary round ===
| Tie | Home team | Score | Away team | Att. |
|---|---|---|---|---|
| 1 | Chester-le-Street Town | 2–5 (a.e.t.) | Darlington 1883 | |
| 2 | Newcastle Benfield | 3–2 | Spennymoor Town | |
| 3 | Blyth Spartans | 5–3 | Hebburn Town | 302 |
| 4 | Workington | 0–4 | Ryton & Crawcrook Albion | 44 |
| 5 | Skelmersdale United | 0–4 | Hyde United | |
| 6 | FC United of Manchester | 3–0 | Curzon Ashton | 391 |
| 7 | A.F.C Blackpool | 3–4 | St Helens Town | 55 |
| 8 | Prescot Cables | 1–2 | Clitheroe | 142 |
| 9 | Altrincham | 3–2 | Stockport County | 203 |
| 10 | Witton Albion | 6–0 | Radcliffe Borough | 68 |
| 11 | Vauxhall | 2–1 | Warrington Town | 77 |
| 12 | Nelson | W.O. | Lancaster City | |
| 13 | Abbey Hey | 3–1 | Witton Albion | |
| 14 | Bootle | W.O. | West Didsbury & Chorlton | |
| 15 | Burscough | 1–4 | Ashton Athletic | 45 |
| 16 | Mossley | 0–3 | Colne | 45 |
| 17 | Sheffield | 3–0 | Maltby Main | 114 |
| 18 | Harrogate Railway Athletic | 3–1 | Hemsworth MW | 33 |
| 19 | Tadcaster Albion | 4–1 | Brighouse Town | 88 |
| 20 | FC Halifax Town | 4–0 | Staveley MW | 145 |
| 21 | Farsley Celtic | 3–2 | Goole | |
| 22 | Ossett Town | 5–7 | Worksop Town | 53 |
| 23 | Garforth Town | 3–2 | Silsden | 64 |
| 24 | Pontefract Collieries | 4–2 | Ossett Albion | 80 |
| 25 | Hall Road Rangers | 7–4 | Selby Town | 57 |
| 26 | Emley | 1–2 | Stocksbridge Park Steels | 93 |
| 27 | Kimberley MW | 3–0 | Bourne Town | 68 |
| 28 | Leicester Nirvana | 3–2 | Lutterworth Athletic | |
| 29 | Stamford | 1–2 | Ashby Ivanhoe | |
| 30 | Anstey Nomads | W.O. | Loughborough Dynamo | |
| 31 | Boston United | 5–0 | Lincoln United | 131 |
| 32 | Grantham Town | 1–2 | Bottesford Town | 90 |
| 33 | Leicester Road | 3–0 | Mickleover Sports | 45 |
| 34 | Matlock Town | 0–7 | Dunkirk | |
| 35 | Alfreton Town | 3–2 | Aylestone Park | 79 |
| 36 | Gresley | 0–3 | St Andrews | |
| 37 | Tamworth | 5–3 (a.e.t.) | Hednesford Town | 292 |
| 38 | Wolverhampton Casuals | 3–0 | Highgate United | 63 |
| 39 | Nuneaton Griff | 1–2 | Kidsgrove Athletic | 91 |
| 40 | Hereford | 8–0 | Malvern Town | |
| 41 | Alvechurch | 7–1 | Sutton Coldfield | 58 |
| 42 | Stourbridge | 3–1 | Redditch United | 65 |
| 43 | Halesowen Town | 2–1 | Coton Green | 62 |
| 44 | Ellesmere Rangers | 4–2 | Rugby Town | |
| 45 | Racing Club Warwick | 1–10 | Romulus | 85 |
| 46 | Dudley Town | 2–5 | Nuneaton Town | 40 |
| 47 | Leamington | W.O. | Paget Rangers | |
| 48 | Coleshill Town | 2–0 | Dudley Sports | 44 |
| 49 | Stratford Town | 1–2 (a.e.t.) | Bromsgrove Sporting | 56 |
| 50 | Newcastle Town | 6–0 | Bilston Town | 96 |
| 51 | St Ives Town | 2–0 | St Neots Town | 88 |
| 52 | Desborough Town | 4–1 | Eynesbury Rovers | |
| 53 | Godmanchester Rovers | 1–3 | Northampton ON Chenecks | 39 |
| 54 | Corby Town | 7–2 | Brackley Town | 54 |
| 55 | AFC Kempston Rovers | 3–0 | Rothwell Corinthians | 73 |
| 56 | Wellingborough Town | 1–5 | AFC Rushden & Diamonds | 115 |
| 57 | Cogenhoe United | 0–2 | Rushden & Higham United | |
| 58 | Peterborough Sports | 1–2 | Peterborough Northern Star | |
| 59 | Wroxham | 4–1 | Felixstowe & Walton United | 39 |
| 60 | Needham Market | 4–1 (a.e.t.) | Great Yarmouth Town | 45 |
| 61 | Leiston | 5–3 | Hadleigh United | 32 |
| 62 | Mildenhall Town | 0–4 | Woodbridge Town | 63 |
| 63 | Fakenham Town | 3–5 | Newmarket Town | 72 |
| 64 | Cornard United | 3–2 | Wisbech St Mary | |
| 65 | Cambridge City | 2–1 | King's Lynn Town | 74 |
| 66 | Bury Town | 1–1 (5–4 p) | Brantham Athletic | 58 |
| 67 | Dereham Town | 1–2 | Ely City | 61 |
| 68 | Stowmarket Town | 0–8 | Sudbury | 36 |
| 69 | Swaffham Town | 1–5 | Walsham Le Willows | 53 |
| 70 | Gorleston | W.O. | Lowestoft Town | |
| 71 | Chelmsford City | 2–1 | Waltham Abbey | 64 |
| 72 | Ilford | W.O. | Clapton | |

| Tie | Home team | Score | Away team | Att. |
|---|---|---|---|---|
| 73 | Hullbridge Sports | 3–4 | AFC Hornchurch | 26 |
| 74 | Heybridge Swifts | 2–4 | Brentwood Town | 51 |
| 75 | Great Wakering Rovers | 2–1 | St Margaretsbury | 55 |
| 76 | Saffron Walden Town | 2–1 | Barking | 81 |
| 77 | Woodford Town | W.O. | Bishop's Stortford | |
| 78 | Thurrock | 3–1 | Royston Town | |
| 79 | Ware | 6–2 | Brightlingsea Regent | |
| 80 | Aveley | 4–1 | Redbridge | 48 |
| 81 | North Greenford United | 4–0 | Hatfield Town | 34 |
| 82 | Hendon | 3–6 | Tring Athletic | 33 |
| 83 | Potters Bar Town | 5–2 | Ashford Town (Middx) | 46 |
| 84 | Bedfont Sports | 5–1 | Harrow Borough | 41 |
| 85 | Colney Heath | 1–4 | Hitchin Town | 39 |
| 86 | Spelthorne Sports | 3–1 | Hadley Wood & Wingate | |
| 87 | Beaconsfield SYCOB | 3–1 | Staines Town | 48 |
| 88 | Buckingham Athletic | 4–3 | Harefield United | 55 |
| 89 | Hemel Hempstead Town | 1–2 | Uxbridge | |
| 90 | Chesham United | 5–0 | Sun Sports | 56 |
| 91 | Hanwell Town | W.O. | Welwyn Garden City | |
| 92 | St Albans City | 4–2 | Hayes & Yeading United | |
| 93 | Sporting Club Thamesmead | W.O. | Croydon | |
| 94 | Eastbourne Borough | 4–1 | Margate | 188 |
| 95 | Bridon Ropes | 1–0 | Chipstead | 65 |
| 96 | Tonbridge Angels | W.O. | Whitstable Town | |
| 97 | East Grinstead Town | 1–3 | Greenwich Borough | 24 |
| 98 | Lewisham Borough | W.O. | VCD Athletic | |
| 99 | Meridian | 4–1 | Faversham Town | 60 |
| 100 | Thamesmead Town | 3–4 | Folkestone Invicta | 49 |
| 101 | Eastbourne Town | 0–2 | Ebbsfleet United | |
| 102 | Dulwich Hamlet | 1–2 | Phoenix Sports | 118 |
| 103 | Erith & Belvedere | W.O. | Ramsgate | |
| 104 | AFC Croydon Athletic | 0–0 (2–3 p) | Lordswood | 37 |
| 105 | Ashford United | 1–0 | Glebe | 33 |
| 106 | Charshalton Athletic | 2–3 | Dartford | |
| 107 | Chessington & Hook United | 2–2 (4–5 p) | Mile Oak | |
| 108 | Pagham | 3–4 | Leatherhead | |
| 109 | Corinthian Casuals | 1–4 | Haywards Heath Town | 91 |
| 110 | Worthing | 7–0 | Dorking Town | |
| 111 | Dorking Wanderers | 3–2 (a.e.t.) | Guildford City | |
| 112 | Whitehawk | 2–1 | Burgess Hill Town | 58 |
| 113 | Metropolitan Police | 3–1 | Three Bridges | |
| 114 | Camberley Town | W.O. | Lancing | |
| 115 | Bognor Regis Town | W.O. | Knaphill | |
| 116 | Lewes | 2–1 | South Park | |
| 117 | Chertsey Town | 10–0 | Redhill | 49 |
| 118 | Shoreham | 2–3 | Westfield | 30 |
| 119 | Wick | W.O. | Walton & Hersham | |
| 120 | Steyning Town | 3–1 | Arundel | 56 |
| 121 | Crawley Down Gatwick | 2–6 | Newhaven | 45 |
| 122 | Ascot United | 3–0 | Carterton | 44 |
| 123 | Hungerford Town | 5–2 | Kidlington | 59 |
| 124 | Wantage Town | 4–3 | Thatcham Town | |
| 125 | Slough Town | 0–6 | Andover Town | |
| 126 | Didcot Town | 3–2 | Shrivenham | |
| 127 | Farnborough Town | 0–3 | Oxford City | 157 |
| 128 | Fleet Town | W.O. | Burnham | |
| 129 | Thame United | 0–2 | Windsor | 25 |
| 130 | Alton Town | 3–3 (6–5 p) | Highmoor Ibis | 40 |
| 131 | Maidenhead United | 2–1 | Binfield | 76 |
| 132 | Holmer Green | 1–6 | Marlow | 50 |
| 133 | Salisbury | 4–2 | Wimborne Town | 104 |
| 134 | Winchester City | 5–3 | Moneyfields | 21 |
| 135 | Tadley Calleva | 1–5 | Hamworthy United | |
| 136 | Christchurch | 1–2 | Sholing | 101 |
| 137 | Havant & Waterlooville | 3–0 | AFC Stoneham | 97 |
| 138 | Yate Town | 3–2 | New College Swindon | 54 |
| 139 | Cirencester Town | 4–2 | Oldland Abbotonians | 39 |
| 140 | Chippenham Town | 4–2 (a.e.t.) | Bristol Manor Farm | 62 |
| 141 | Bishop Sutton | 1–0 | Portishead Town | 45 |
| 142 | Clevedon Town | 2–4 | Weston Super Mare | 73 |
| 143 | Bridgwater Town | 1–4 | Paulton Rovers | 48 |
| 144 | Odd Down | 0–1 | Bath City | 70 |
| 145 | Radstock Town | 6–2 | Brislington | 57 |

=== First round qualifying ===
| Tie | Home team | Score | Away team | Att. |
|---|---|---|---|---|
| 1 | Blyth Spartans | 1–8 | Durham City | 329 |
| 2 | Shildon | 1–2 | Darlington 1883 | |
| 3 | South Shields | 1–2 (a.e.t.) | Newcastle Benfield | 50 |
| 4 | Ryton & Crawcrook Albion | W.O. | Kendal Town | |
| 5 | Vauxhall Motors | 1–4 | Altrincham | 103 |
| 6 | St Helens Town | 2–1 | Chadderton | |
| 7 | Marine | 4–1 | Abbey Hey | 117 |
| 8 | Ashton Athletic | 6–1 | Colne | 51 |
| 9 | Clitheroe | 1–0 | Chorley | |
| 10 | Stalybiridge Celtic | 0–5 | AFC Fylde | 35 |
| 11 | West Didsbury & Chorlton | 3–2 | Nantwich Town | |
| 12 | AFC Ashton Town | 2–4 | FC United of Manchester | 125 |
| 13 | AFC Darwen | 2–2 (2–4 p) | Irlam | |
| 14 | Hyde United | 1–0 (a.e.t.) | Nelson | 87 |
| 15 | Farsley Celtic | 2–3 | Nostell Miners Welfare | 68 |
| 16 | Rossington Main | 0–3 | Garforth Town | |
| 17 | Handsworth Parramore | 4–0 | Cleethorpes Town | 78 |
| 18 | FC Halifax Town | 1–0 | Stocksbridge Park Steels | 159 |
| 19 | Worksop Town | 2–4 | Sheffield | 159 |
| 20 | Harrogate Railway Athletic | 0–1 | Hall Road Rangers | 44 |
| 21 | Barton Town Old Boys | 6–1 | Harrogate Town | 80 |
| 22 | Pontefract Collieries | 3–2 | Tadcaster Albion | 107 |
| 23 | Belper Town | 4–3 | Basford United | |
| 24 | Boston United | 1–0 | Leicester Nirvana | 87 |
| 25 | St Andrews | 0–5 | Bottesford Town | 35 |
| 26 | Kimberley MW | 2–1 | Leicester Road | 58 |
| 27 | Ilkeston | 1–3 | Dunkirk | 119 |
| 28 | Loughborough Dynamo | 6–2 | New Mills | |
| 29 | Ashby Ivanhoe | 1–6 | Alfreton Town | 110 |
| 30 | Boldmere St Michaels | 4–5 | AFC Telford United | 78 |
| 31 | Kidderminster Harriers | 4–0 | Kidsgrove Athletic | |
| 32 | Romulus | 8–0 | Leamington | |
| 33 | Coleshill Town | 5–3 | Alvechurch | 33 |
| 34 | Stourbridge | 0–1 | Newcastle Town | 85 |
| 35 | Rushall Olympic | 6–0 | Leek Town | |
| 36 | Ellesmere Rangers | W.O. | Worcester City | |
| 37 | Bromsgrove Sporting | 2–0 | Halesowen Town | 127 |
| 38 | Nuneaton Town | 4–3 (a.e.t.) | Lye Town | 40 |
| 39 | Evesham United | 0–2 | Hereford | 120 |
| 40 | Pegasus Junios | 2–3 (a.e.t.) | Bedworth United | 32 |
| 41 | Tamworth | 3–5 | Wolverhampton Casuals | 131 |
| 42 | Peterborough Northern Star | 1–2 | Biggleswade Town | |
| 43 | Desborough Town | 0–3 | AFC Rushden & Diamonds | 82 |
| 44 | Kempston Rovers | 0–7 | Kettering Town | 72 |
| 45 | Northampton ON Chenecks | 1–2 (a.e.t.) | AFC Dunstable | |
| 46 | Yaxley | 4–5 | Rushden & Higham United | 43 |
| 47 | St Ives Town | 3–2 | Corby Town | 56 |
| 48 | Framlingham Town | 7–3 | Histon | |
| 49 | Cambridge City | 0–1 | Ely City | 87 |
| 50 | Bury Town | 4–1 | Norwich United | 47 |
| 51 | Wroxham | 1–2 | Gorleston | 47 |
| 52 | Newmarket Town | 1–9 | AFC Sudbury | 73 |
| 53 | Needham Market | 12–1 | Haverhill Rovers | 42 |
| 54 | Woodbridge Town | 10–0 | Cornard United | 55 |
| 55 | Leiston | 2–1 | Walsham Le Willows | 45 |
| 56 | Whitton United | 5–3 | Ipswich Wanderers | 50 |
| 57 | Bishop's Stortford | 3–2 | Great Wakering Rovers | 121 |
| 58 | AFC Hornchurch | 3–1 | Tower Hamlets | 44 |
| 59 | Sawbridgeworth Town | 1–7 | Ware | |
| 60 | Barkingside | 3–4 (a.e.t.) | Concord Rangers | 48 |
| 61 | Brentwood Town | 2–5 | Cheshunt | 68 |

| Tie | Home team | Score | Away team | Att. |
|---|---|---|---|---|
| 62 | Tilbury | 9–1 | Waltham Forest | 54 |
| 63 | Aveley | 4–1 | Halstead Town | 38 |
| 64 | Broxbourne Borough | 2–1 | Ilford | 15 |
| 65 | Wadham Lodge | 4–2 (a.e.t.) | Saffron Walden Town | 95 |
| 66 | Chelmsford City | 2–1 | Thurrock | 99 |
| 67 | CB Hounslow United | 1–3 | Beaconsfield SYCOB | |
| 68 | Spelthorne Sports | 1–2 | Potters Bar Town | 50 |
| 69 | Uxbridge | 6–2 | Flackwell Heath | 127 |
| 70 | Hanwell Town | 5–1 | Northwood | |
| 71 | Bedfont Sports | 3–2 (a.e.t.) | Chesham United | |
| 72 | Chalfont St Peter | 0–1 | Wealdstone | 73 |
| 73 | Leverstock Green | 1–6 | Cockfosters | 47 |
| 74 | North Greenford United | 10–1 | London Tigers | 25 |
| 75 | Edgware Town | 2–2 (3–0 p) | Hitchin Town | 54 |
| 76 | St Albans City | 4–2 | Tring Athletic | |
| 77 | Wingate & Finchley | 5–3 (a.e.t.) | Buckingham Athletic | |
| 78 | Lingfield | 1–3 | Meridian | |
| 79 | VCD Athletic | W.O. | Bridon Ropes | |
| 80 | Ebbsfleet United | 1–0 | Dartford | 181 |
| 81 | Ramsgate | 0–4 | Hastings United | |
| 82 | Tonbridge Angels | 4–0 | Phoenix Sports | |
| 83 | Ashford United | 9–0 | Little Common | |
| 84 | Corinthian | 13–1 | Cray Wanderers | 66 |
| 85 | Harefield United | 2–0 | Sevenoaks Town | 68 |
| 86 | Tooting & Mitcham United | 0–2 | Greenwich Borough | 29 |
| 87 | Lordswood | 0–0 (11–10 p) | Eastbourne Borough | |
| 88 | Welling United | 1–3 | Folkestone Invicta | 121 |
| 89 | Metropolitan Police | 1–0 | Dorking Wanderers | |
| 90 | Haywards Heath Town | 2–0 | Chichester City | |
| 91 | Molesey | 8–2 | Knaphill | |
| 92 | Chertsey Town | 1–4 | Westfield | 42 |
| 93 | Worthing | 6–1 | Horley Town | 40 |
| 94 | Steyning Town | 1–4 | Hampton & Richmond Borough | 43 |
| 95 | Lewes | 6–1 | Wick | |
| 96 | Merstham | 7–1 | Leatherhead | 57 |
| 97 | Newhaven | 0–6 | Whitehawk | 42 |
| 98 | Mile Oak | 1–3 | Camberley Town | 43 |
| 99 | Marlow | 6–0 | Basingstoke Town | 54 |
| 100 | Didcot Town | 1–4 | Hungerford Town | 61 |
| 101 | Maidenhead United | 3–6 | Oxford City | |
| 102 | Ascot United | 5–2 | Burnham | 98 |
| 103 | Bracknell Town | 2–2 (4–3 p) | Windsor | |
| 104 | Andover Town | 6–2 | Hartley Wintney | 55 |
| 105 | Wantage Town | 3–2 | Alton Town | 32 |
| 106 | Fareham Town | 0–1 | Team Solent | 47 |
| 107 | Havant & Waterlooville | 4–4 (4–1 p) | Winchester City | 79 |
| 108 | Cove | 0–10 | Poole Town | 53 |
| 109 | Salisbury | W.O. | Weymouth | |
| 110 | Gosport Borough | 2–1 (a.e.t.) | AFC Portchester | 110 |
| 111 | Sholing | 1–0 | Ringwood Town | 70 |
| 112 | Hamworthy United | 2–2 (4–3 p) | AFC Totton | 65 |
| 113 | Chippenham Town | 0–7 | Gloucester City | 121 |
| 114 | Tuffley Rovers | 1–9 | Yate Town | 49 |
| 115 | Bradford Town | 0–5 | Cirencester Town | |
| 116 | Bitton | 3–0 | Malmesbury Victoria | |
| 117 | Ashton & Backwell United | 0–3 | Weston Super Mare | |
| 118 | Bath City | 9–0 | Bishop Sutton | 76 |
| 119 | Radstock Town | 4–1 | Taunton Town | 50 |
| 120 | Cullompton Rangers | 4–2 | Welton Rovers | 36 |
| 121 | Paulton Rovers | 2–0 | Larkhall Athletic | 51 |

=== Second round qualifying ===
| Tie | Home team | Score | Away team | Att. |
|---|---|---|---|---|
| 1 | Darlington 1883 | 2–1 | Clitheroe | |
| 2 | West Didsbury & Chorlton | 2–9 | Irlam | 71 |
| 3 | St Helens Town | 1–2 | Newcastle Benfield | 48 |
| 4 | Southport | 1–5 | Altrincham | 141 |
| 5 | Ryton & Crawcrook Albion | 4–0 | Marine | 101 |
| 6 | Tranmere Rovers | 3–0 | Durham City | 118 |
| 7 | FC United of Manchester | 3–0 | Gateshead | 164 |
| 8 | AFC Fylde | 4–1 | Barrow | 69 |
| 9 | Hyde United | 2–1 (a.e.t.) | Ashton Athletic | 49 |
| 10 | Wrexham | 2–1 | North Ferriby United | 59 |
| 11 | York City | 6–0 | Garforth Town | |
| 12 | Pontefract Collieries | 4–1 | Hall Road Rangers | |
| 13 | Barton Town Old Boys | 2–1 (a.e.t.) | Handsworth Parramore | |
| 14 | Nostell MW | 2–0 | Sheffield | 95 |
| 15 | Guiseley | 2–3 | FC Halifax Town | |
| 16 | Belper Town | 4–5 | Alfreton Town | |
| 17 | Lincoln City | 4–5 (a.e.t.) | Dunkirk | 71 |
| 18 | Boston United | 3–1 | Loughborough Dynamo | 126 |
| 19 | Bottesford Town | 0–2 | Kimberley MW | 63 |
| 20 | Solihull Moors | 2–1 | Coleshill Town | 70 |
| 21 | Bedworth United | 3–3 (4–3 p) | Rushall Olympic | |
| 22 | Newcastle Town | 3–2 | Ellesmere Rangers | 77 |
| 23 | Hereford | 8–1 | Bromsgrove Sporting | 130 |
| 24 | Wolverhampton Casuals | 3–1 | AFC Telford United | |
| 25 | Romulus | 3–1 | Kidderminster Harriers | |
| 26 | AFC Rushden & Diamonds | 1–3 | Ely City | |
| 27 | Biggleswade Town | 3–0 | St Ives Town | |
| 28 | Kettering Town | 3–2 | Nuneaton Town | 23 |
| 29 | AFC Dunstable | 4–4 (2–4 p) | Rushden & Higham United | 28 |
| 30 | Framlingham Town | 5–4 (a.e.t.) | Gorleston | 55 |
| 31 | Chelmsford City | 0–1 | Leiston | 95 |
| 32 | Whitton United | 0–4 | AFC Sudbury | 54 |
| 33 | Bury Town | 0–5 | Woodbridge Town | 64 |
| 34 | Braintree Town | 1–1 (3–2 p) | Needham Market | |
| 35 | Bishop's Stortford | 1–2 | Ware | 135 |
| 36 | Wadham Lodge | 1–2 | Aveley | 64 |

| Tie | Home team | Score | Away team | Att. |
|---|---|---|---|---|
| 37 | Broxbourne Borough | 3–2 (a.e.t.) | Concord Rangers | 68 |
| 38 | AFC Hornchurch | 4–0 | Tilbury | 57 |
| 39 | Dagenham & Redbridge | 4–1 | Cheshunt | |
| 40 | Boreham Wood | 5–1 | Hanwell Town | |
| 41 | St Albans City | 1–3 | Wealdstone | 73 |
| 42 | Bedfont Sports | 1–0 | Cockfosters | 41 |
| 43 | Hitchin Town | 1–3 | North Greenford United | 75 |
| 44 | Wingate & Finchley | 2–3 (a.e.t.) | Beaconsfield SYCOB | |
| 45 | Uxbridge | 3–2 (a.e.t.) | Potters Bar Town | 131 |
| 46 | Maidstone United | 6–2 | Bridon Ropes | 166 |
| 47 | Tonbridge Angels | 3–0 | Dover Athletic | |
| 48 | Bromley | 2–3 | Folkestone Invicta | 102 |
| 49 | Greenwich Borough | 1–4 | Ashford United | |
| 50 | Sporting Club Thamesmead | 2–3 | Meridian | |
| 51 | Lordswood | 1–2 (a.e.t.) | Ebbsfleet United | |
| 52 | Hastings United | 2–3 | Corinthian | |
| 53 | Sutton United | 5–4 (a.e.t.) | Molesey | |
| 54 | Whitehawk | 0–1 | Worthing | |
| 55 | Westfield | 0–3 | Hampton & Richmond Borough | 40 |
| 56 | Merstham | 3–0 | Lewes | 63 |
| 57 | Camberley Town | 2–5 | Woking | 129 |
| 58 | Haywards Heath Town | 1–8 | Metropolitan Police | 48 |
| 59 | Wantage Town | 1–4 | Bracknell Town | 40 |
| 60 | Oxford City | 4–4 (6–5 p) | Ascot United | |
| 61 | Hungerford Town | 4–2 | Marlow | 91 |
| 62 | Eastleigh | 3–1 | Havant & Waterlooville | 113 |
| 63 | Andover Town | 2–1 | Sholing | 63 |
| 64 | Hamworthy United | 1–7 | Poole Town | 112 |
| 65 | Team Solent | 3–4 | Gosport Borough | 45 |
| 66 | Aldershot Town | 0–2 | Salisbury | 88 |
| 67 | Gloucester City | 4–1 | Cirencester Town | |
| 68 | Paulton Rovers | 1–2 | Radstock Town | 133 |
| 69 | Cullompton Rangers | 2–3 | Bitton | 36 |
| 70 | Yate Town | 0–7 | Bath City | 86 |
| 71 | Forest Green Rovers | 6–4 (a.e.t.) | Weston Super Mare | |

=== Third round qualifying ===
| Tie | Home team | Score | Away team | Att. |
|---|---|---|---|---|
| 1 | Altrincham | 1–7 | Tranmere Rovers | 148 |
| 2 | Hyde United | 2–0 | Irlam | 100 |
| 3 | York City | 9–0 | Barton Town Old Boys | 160 |
| 4 | Ryton & Crawcrook Albion | 4–2 | Darlington 1883 | 162 |
| 5 | Newcastle Benfield | 0–8 | Chester | |
| 6 | Pontefract Collieries | 0–3 | Wrexham | 146 |
| 7 | FC Halifax Town | 4–1 | AFC Fylde | 143 |
| 8 | Nostell MW | 2–3 | FC United of Manchester | 81 |
| 9 | Romulus | 2–1 | Kettering Town | |
| 10 | Kimberley MW | 0–9 | Boston United | 145 |
| 11 | Dunkirk | 2–1 | Alfreton Town | |
| 12 | Hereford | 2–1 | Newcastle Town | 43 |
| 13 | Wolverhampton Casuals | 4–3 | Solihull Moors | |
| 14 | Ely City | 1–2 | Bedworth United | |
| 15 | Braintree Town | 2–4† | Dagenham & Redbridge | |
| 16 | Biggleswade Town | 0–2 | Beaconsfield SYCOB | |
| 17 | Woodbridge Town | 1–2† | AFC Sudbury | 130 |
| 18 | Uxbridge | 1–3 | North Greenford United | 139 |

| Tie | Home team | Score | Away team | Att. |
|---|---|---|---|---|
| 19 | Aveley | 0–3 | Broxbourne Borough | 31 |
| 20 | AFC Hornchurch | 5–0 | Rushden & Higham United | 56 |
| 21 | Framlingham Town | 2–0 | Leiston | |
| 22 | Boreham Wood | 4–0 | Wealdstone | 94 |
| 23 | Ware | 3–0 | Bedfont Sports | |
| 24 | Hampton & Richmond Borough | 0–1 | Metropolitan Police | 83 |
| 25 | Ashford United | 0–1 | Folkestone Invicta | 129 |
| 26 | Tonbridge Angels | 5–5 (5–6 p) | Maidstone United | 256 |
| 27 | Sutton United | 0–3 | Corinthian | 115 |
| 28 | Worthing | 4–0 | Meridian | |
| 29 | Merstham | 4–0 | Ebbsfleet United | 67 |
| 30 | Eastleigh | 2–1 | Hungerford Town | 132 |
| 31 | Bath City | 0–2 | Gloucester City | 88 |
| 32 | Poole Town | 9–0 | Bracknell Town | 83 |
| 33 | Woking | 4–5 | Radstock Town | 134 |
| 34 | Salisbury | 3–1† | Bitton | 98 |
| 35 | Gosport Borough | 0–3 | Andover Town | |
| 36 | Forest Green Rovers | 1–2 | Oxford City | |

== First round ==
| Tie | Home team | Score | Away team | Att. |
|---|---|---|---|---|
| 1 | Bradford City | 1–0 | Hartlepool United | 242 |
| 2 | Chester | 1–0 | Fleetwood Town | 413 |
| 3 | Sheffield United | 2–1 | Crewe Alexandra | 612 |
| 4 | FC United of Manchester | 0–2 | Carlisle United | 342 |
| 5 | Hyde United | 1–4 | Morecambe | 140 |
| 6 | Wrexham | 0–2 | Accrington Stanley | 140 |
| 7 | Bolton Wanderers | 2–1† | Blackpool | 666 |
| 8 | Scunthorpe United | 2–0 | Grimsby Town | 310 |
| 9 | Oldham Athletic | 2–0 | Bury | 219 |
| 10 | Tranmere Rovers | 3–0 | Doncaster Rovers | 171 |
| 11 | FC Halifax Town | 2–2 (4–3 p) | York City | 236 |
| 12 | Rochdale | 7–0 | Ryton & Crawcrook Albion | 236 |
| 13 | Dunkirk | 3–2† | Coventry City | 315 |
| 14 | Notts County | 1–3 | Romulus | 297 |
| 15 | Peterborough United | 2–0 | Port Vale | 386 |
| 16 | Shrewsbury Town | 5–1 | Wolverhampton Casuals | 231 |
| 17 | Bedworth United | 0–3 | Mansfield Town | 347 |
| 18 | Chesterfield | 3–1 | Walsall | 300 |
| 19 | Boston United | 3–2 | Hereford | 175 |
| 20 | Boreham Wood | 1–0 | Northampton Town | 144 |
| 21 | Cambridge United | 4–1 | Beaconsfield SYCOB | 158 |

| Tie | Home team | Score | Away team | Att. |
|---|---|---|---|---|
| 22 | Barnet | 1–3 | Luton Town | 256 |
| 23 | Southend United | 0–6 | Leyton Orient | 298 |
| 24 | Dagenham & Redbridge | 7–3 | Colchester United | 155 |
| 25 | AFC Sudbury | 2–1 | Framlingham Town | 133 |
| 26 | Milton Keynes Dons | 6–1 | AFC Hornchurch | 400 |
| 27 | Ware | 2–4† | Stevenage | 303 |
| 28 | Charlton Athletic | 1–1 (3–1 p) | Maidstone United | 250 |
| 29 | Millwall | 6–0 | Worthing | 281 |
| 30 | Gillingham | 3–1 | Corinthian | 275 |
| 31 | Folkestone Invicta | 1–4 | Merstham | 221 |
| 32 | AFC Wimbledon | 8–1 | North Greenford United | 396 |
| 33 | Gloucester City | 0–4 | Poole Town | 80 |
| 34 | Newport County | 0–1 | Yeovil Town | 139 |
| 35 | Radstock Town | 0–8 | Exeter City | 330 |
| 36 | Oxford United | 0–2 | Bristol City | 228 |
| 37 | Andover Town | 2–3 | Oxford City | 90 |
| 38 | Cheltenham Town | 1–5 | Plymouth Argyle | 176 |
| 39 | Salisbury | 2–3 | Swindon Town | 237 |
| 40 | Portsmouth | 5–0 | Eastleigh | 758 |
| 41 | Broxbourne Borough | – | BYE | |
| 42 | Metropolitan Police | – | BYE | |

== Second round ==
| Tie | Home team | Score | Away team | Att. |
|---|---|---|---|---|
| 1 | FC Halifax Town | 1–5 | Sheffield United | 318 |
| 2 | Rochdale | 1–2 | Shrewsbury Town | 141 |
| 3 | Chester | 2–0 | Bolton Wanderers | 580 |
| 4 | Morecambe | 2–2 (2–4 p) | Accrington Stanley | 156 |
| 5 | Mansfield Town | 5–2 | Dunkirk | 506 |
| 6 | Chesterfield | 1–2 (a.e.t.) | Carlisle United | 250 |
| 7 | Bradford City | 2–1 | Boston United | 305 |
| 8 | Scunthorpe United | 2–4 | Tranmere Rovers | 194 |
| 9 | Romulus | 0–2 | Oldham Athletic | 185 |
| 10 | Poole Town | 1–7 | Leyton Orient | 316 |
| 11 | Swindon Town | 3–2 (a.e.t.) | AFC Sudbury | 153 |

| Tie | Home team | Score | Away team | Att. |
|---|---|---|---|---|
| 12 | Plymouth Argyle | 2–2 (2–4 p) | Gillingham | 341 |
| 13 | Stevenage | 2–0 | Charlton Athletic | 292 |
| 14 | Luton Town | 4–3 (a.e.t.) | Dagenham & Redbridge | 408 |
| 15 | Oxford City | 3–1 | Peterborough United | 193 |
| 16 | Boreham Wood | 1–2 | Broxbourne Borough | 157 |
| 17 | Portsmouth | 2–0 | Metropolitan Police | 573 |
| 18 | Cambridge United | 2–0 | Millwall | 164 |
| 19 | Yeovil Town | 2–0 | Merstham | 261 |
| 20 | AFC Wimbledon | 3–0 | Bristol Rovers | 310 |
| 21 | Exeter City | 3–1 | Milton Keynes Dons | 173 |

== Third round ==
| Tie | Home team | Score | Away team | Att. |
|---|---|---|---|---|
| 1 | Middlesbrough | 5–0 | Rotherham United | 207 |
| 2 | Liverpool | 2–2 (5–4 p) | Crystal Palace | 300 |
| 3 | Broxbourne Borough | 1–0 (a.e.t.) | Chester | 454 |
| 4 | Burnley | 2–0 | Bradford City | 381 |
| 5 | Watford | 1–5 | Norwich City | 550 |
| 6 | Gillingham | 2–0 | Oxford City | 251 |
| 7 | Huddersfield Town | 1–2 | AFC Wimbledon | 246 |
| 8 | Reading | 0–4 | Manchester City | 517 |
| 9 | Swindon Town | 1–3 | Queens Park Rangers | 235 |
| 10 | Shrewsbury Town | 2–1 | Accrington Stanley | 240 |
| 11 | Portsmouth | 1–4 | Newcastle United | 832 |
| 12 | Leicester City | 3–1 | Leyton Orient | 359 |
| 13 | Brighton & Hove Albion | 2–0 | Derby County | 273 |
| 14 | Exeter City | 1–2 (a.e.t.) | Wigan Athletic | 630 |
| 15 | Arsenal | 0–1 | Blackburn Rovers | 327 |
| 16 | Preston North End | 1–0 | Sheffield United | 345 |

| Tie | Home team | Score | Away team | Att. |
|---|---|---|---|---|
| 17 | Oldham Athletic | 1–4 | Birmingham City | 242 |
| 18 | Swansea City | 2–1 | Wolverhampton Wanderers | 156 |
| 19 | Sunderland | 4–1 | Burton Albion | 206 |
| 20 | Fulham | 3–1 | Mansfield Town | 275 |
| 21 | Cambridge United | 2–1 | AFC Bournemouth | 406 |
| 22 | Barnsley | 0–1 | Carlisle United | 284 |
| 23 | Chelsea | 5–0 | Cardiff City | 210 |
| 24 | Everton | 2–0 | Tranmere Rovers | 703 |
| 25 | Stoke City | 2–2 (4–2 p) | West Ham United | 200 |
| 26 | Nottingham Forest | 4–2 (a.e.t.) | Ipswich Town | 366 |
| 27 | West Bromwich Albion | 2–3 | Yeovil Town | 218 |
| 28 | Hull City | 3–2 (a.e.t.) | Leeds United | 221 |
| 29 | Tottenham Hotspur | 10–1 | Stevenage | 897 |
| 30 | Bristol City | 0–2 | Aston Villa | 301 |
| 31 | Sheffield Wednesday | 4–0 | Luton Town | 315 |
| 32 | Manchester United | 1–2 | Southampton | 1,943 |

== Fourth round ==
| Tie | Home team | Score | Away team | Att. |
|---|---|---|---|---|
| 1 | Preston North End | 0–0 (7–6 p) | Everton | 623 |
| 2 | AFC Wimbledon | 3–0 | Hull City | 663 |
| 3 | Stoke City | 4–1 | Nottingham Forest | 549 |
| 4 | Middlesbrough | 2–1 | Fulham | 255 |
| 5 | Blackburn Rovers | 0–0 (6–7 p) | Aston Villa | 824 |
| 6 | Newcastle United | 3–1 | Swansea City | 1,307 |
| 7 | Queens Park Rangers | 1–4 | Tottenham Hotspur | 647 |
| 8 | Wigan Athletic | 1–2 | Southampton | 304 |

| Tie | Home team | Score | Away team | Att. |
|---|---|---|---|---|
| 9 | Manchester City | 3–1 | Liverpool | 1,500 |
| 10 | Brighton & Hove Albion | 2–0 | Cambridge United | 298 |
| 11 | Leicester City | 2–1 | Carlisle United | 386 |
| 12 | Birmingham City | 0–5 | Chelsea | 665 |
| 13 | Broxbourne Borough | 1–0 | Yeovil Town | 789 |
| 14 | Sheffield Wednesday | 3–0 | Gillingham | 650 |
| 15 | Burnley | 0–4 | Norwich City | 527 |
| 16 | Sunderland | 3–1 | Shrewsbury Town | 235 |

== Fifth round ==
| Tie | Home team | Score | Away team | Att. |
|---|---|---|---|---|
| 1 | Manchester City | 4–0 | Southampton | 1,300 |
| 2 | Chelsea | 4–0 | Sheffield Wednesday | 234 |
| 3 | Aston Villa | 7–0 | Broxbourne Borough | 901 |
| 4 | Sunderland | 3–4 | Newcastle United | 1,009 |
| 5 | Tottenham Hotspur | 2–0 | Norwich City | 698 |
| 6 | Stoke City | 2–2 (4–2 p) | Brighton & Hove Albion | 400 |
| 7 | Middlesbrough | 0–1 (a.e.t.) | Leicester City | 231 |
| 8 | Preston North End | 3–2 (a.e.t.) | AFC Wimbledon | 519 |

== Quarter-finals ==
| Tie | Home team | Score | Away team | Att. |
|---|---|---|---|---|
| 1 | Leicester City | 0–1 | Chelsea | 449 |
| 2 | Newcastle United | 3–5 | Tottenham Hotspur | 2,847 |
| 3 | Preston North End | 1–3 | Stoke City | 1,747 |
| 4 | Aston Villa | 1–2 | Manchester City | 964 |

== Semi-finals ==
| Team 1 | Agg. | Team 2 | 1st leg | 2nd leg |
|---|---|---|---|---|
| Manchester City | 9–2 | Stoke City | 6–0 | 3–2 |
| Tottenham Hotspur | 2–9 | Chelsea | 1–2 | 1–7 |

=== First leg ===
10 March 2017
19:00

| Manchester City | 6-0 | Stoke City |
|---|---|---|
| Diaz 8'; Foden 28'; Nmecha 45' 67' 78'; Duhaney 52' | Report |

Academy Stadium, Manchester
Attendance: 3,205
Referee: Ross Joyce

14 March 2017
19:00

| Tottenham Hotspur | 1–2 | Chelsea |
|---|---|---|
| Sterling 88' | Report | James 34'; Ubgo 40' |

White Hart Lane, Tottenham
Attendance: 2,533
Referee: Lee Swabey

=== Second leg ===
18 March 2017
17:15

| Chelsea | 7–1 | Tottenham Hotspur |
|---|---|---|
| Ugbo 4' 37' (pen.) 68'; Chalobah 18'; Sterling 56'; Hudson-Odoi 62'; Castillo 85' | Report | Roles 70' |

Stamford Bridge, Fulham
Attendance: 3,314
Referee: John Busby

Chelsea won 9–2 on Aggregate.

3 April 2017
19:45

| Stoke City | 2–3 | Manchester City |
|---|---|---|
| Greenidge 25' 80' | Report | Nmecha 3' 26' (pen.) 58' |

Bet365 Stadium, Stoke-on-Trent
Attendance: 983
Referee: Michael Salisbury

Manchester City won 9–2 on Aggregate.

== Final ==
| Team 1 | Agg. | Team 2 | 1st leg | 2nd leg |
|---|---|---|---|---|
| Manchester City | 2–6 | Chelsea | 1–1 | 1–5 |

=== First leg ===
18 April 2017
19:45

| Manchester City | 1–1 | Chelsea |
|---|---|---|
| Foden 62' | Report | Ugbo 44' |

Academy Stadium
Attendance: 3,392
Referee: Oliver Langford

=== Second leg ===
27 April 2017
19:45

| Chelsea | 5–1 | Manchester City |
|---|---|---|
| Chalobah 7'; Ugbo 24'; Hudson-Odoi 60'; Sterling 66'; Dasilva 87' | Report | Nmecha 52' |

Stamford Bridge
Attendance: 4,892
Referee: Oliver Langford

== See also ==
- 2016–17 Premier League Cup
- 2016–17 FA Cup
- 2016–17 Professional U18 Development League
