= WCFC =

WCFC may refer to:

== Broadcasting ==
- WCFC-LP, a low-power radio station (93.7 FM) licensed to Richmond, Virginia, United States
- WCFC-CA, a defunct television station (channel 51) that was licensed to Rockford, Illinois, United States
- WCPX-TV, a television station (channel 38) licensed to Chicago, Illinois that formerly used the WCFC call letters
- WCFC-FM & WCFC (West Virginia), defunct radio stations licensed to Beckley, West Virginia.

== Football ==
- Walton Casuals F.C.
- Wells City F.C.
- West Coburg Football Club
- Winchester Castle F.C.
- Winchester City F.C.
- Wollongong Community Football Club
- Wolverhampton Casuals F.C.
- Worcester City F.C.
