= Bass Alton F.C. =

Bass (Alton) F.C.
- Full name: Bass (Alton) Football Club
- Nickname: The Brewers
- Founded: 1920
- Dissolved: 1991
- Ground: Bass Sports Ground, Alton
Home colours	Away colours

Bass (Alton) F.C. were a long running amateur football club based in Alton, a market town in east Hampshire, England.

In existence for over 70 years, 'The Brewers' were long standing members of the Hampshire League until 1991 when they merged with neighbours and league rivals Alton Town to create Alton F.C.

== History ==
The club were formed as Courage & Co - as the works side of the large brewery site based in Alton.

They joined the Basingstoke & District League in 1922, winning the Division 1 title in 1928. With their company owned sports ground, Courages then gained admittance to the Hampshire League Division 2 and won the Hampshire Intermediate Cup in their very first season. The following year they won the title and were promoted to Division 1 which at the time was of a very high standard. During this time they also began entering national competitions, and performed well in both the F.A. Cup and F.A. Amateur Cup.

After World War II, Courages found themselves living in the shadow of the recently formed Alton Town, who would soon enjoy great success. This saw 'the Brewers' spend many years playing in the Aldershot League, apart from the 1954/55 campaign when they took part in the Hampshire League's short-lived North Division.

In 1972 Courages returned to the county league and were placed in Division 4. They initially performed well and won promotion in 1975, but then only lasted two seasons before being relegated.

When the brewery was taken over by Bass in 1979, the club was renamed Bass (Alton), and with Alton Town now in decline, they then re-emerged as the top team in the area after a series of promotions saw them return to Division 1 in 1983 after a 45-year absence. The following season saw an exciting run in the Hampshire Senior Cup, causing a big shock after defeating Basingstoke Town 2-1 at the Camrose to reach the semi-finals. Here they took on another giant, Farnborough Town, but lost 1-3 to the evenual winners. Bass also twice reached the final of the Aldershot Senior Cup and continued to hold their own in the top-flight, although the competition was weakened in 1986 after the Wessex League was formed.

A year later, their resurgent neighbours joined them in Division 1 for what was the first time that the two rivals had played at the same level. However, after a poor 1990/91 campaign (which saw Bass finish rock bottom and Town a few places above) it had become clear that the area could not sustain two successful senior clubs. There had always been a close friendly relationship between the two camps so they then decided to join forces to create the present day Alton F.C.

The merger was successful and has enabled the club to progress further up the pyramid system.

== Honours ==
- Hampshire Football Association
  - Intermediate Cup Winners 1928/29
- Hampshire League
  - Division 2 Champions 1929/30, Runners-up 1982/83
- Aldershot Football Association
  - Senior Cup Finalists 1984/85 and 1987/88
- Aldershot League
  - Division 1 Champions
  - Division 2 Champions
- Basingstoke & District League
  - Division 1 Champions 1927/28

== Playing Records ==
=== Hampshire League ===
Season	Division	Position	Significant events
1928/29	Division 2	3/12	Hampshire Intermediate Cup winners
1929/30	Division 2	1/12	Promoted
1930/31	Division 1	11/16	
1931/32	Division 1	8/16	
1932/33	Division 1	11/15	
1933/34	Division 1	9/16	
1934/35	Division 1	10/16	
1935/36	Division 1	12/16	
1936/37	Division 1	14/16	
1937/38	Division 1	16/16	Relegated
1938/39	Division 2	3/15	
1954/55	North Division	10/11	left competition
1972/73	Division 4	10/16	
1973/74	Division 4	6/16	
1974/75	Division 4	4/16	Promoted
1975/76	Division 3	9/16	
1976/77	Division 3	15/16	Relegated
1977/78	Division 4	9/16	
1978/79	Division 4	11/13	
1979/80	Division 4	11/12	League restructure at end of season
1980/81	Division 3	12/18	
1981/82	Division 3	3/16	Promoted
1982/83	Division 2	2/20	Promoted
1983/84	Division 1	13/20	Hampshire Senior Cup Semi-Finalists
1984/85	Division 1	14/20	Aldershot Senior Cup Finalists
1985/86	Division 1	17/20	League restructure at end of season
1986/87	Division 1	15/18	
1987/88	Division 1	12/18	Aldershot Senior Cup Finalists
1988/89	Division 1	15/17	
1989/90	Division 1	15/18	
1990/91	Division 1	18/18	Merged with Alton Town

=== FA Cup ===
Season	Round	Opponents	Result
1930/31	Preliminary Round	H v Thornycroft Athletic	W 4-3
	1st Qualifying Round	A v Egham	L 3–6
1931/32	Preliminary Round	H v Basingstoke Town	W 4-1
	1st Qualifying Round	H v Egham	W 6-0
	2nd Qualifying Round	H v Camberley & Yorktown	W 4-3
	3rd Qualifying Round	H v Winchester City	L 3-4
1932/33	1st Qualifying Round	H v Staines Town	W 4-2
	2nd Qualifying Round	H v Godalming Town	D 2-2
	Replay	A v Godalming Town	L 0-1
1933/34	1st Qualifying Round	A v Egham	L 2-4
1934/35	Extra-Preliminary Round	A v Redhill	L 0-4
1935/36	Extra-Preliminary Round	A v Brookwood Hospital	W 5-0
	Preliminary Round	H v Godalming Town	W 3-0
	1st Qualifying Round	A v Metropolitan Police	W 4-1
	2nd Qualifying Round	A v PO Engineers (Beddington)	L 2-5
1936/37	Preliminary Round	H v Cowes	D 0-0
	Replay	A v Cowes	W 3-2
	1st Qualifying Round	H v Salisbury City	D 3-3
	Replay	A v Salisbury City	L 0-3
1937/38	Preliminary Round	A v Dorchester Town	W 3-0
	1st Qualifying Round	A v Basingstoke Town	W 6-2
	2nd Qualifying Round	H v Weymouth	W 2-1
	3rd Qualifying Round	A v Cowes	L 1-8

=== FA Amateur Cup ===
Season	Round	Opponents	Result
1930/31	1st Qualifying Round	H v Guildford City	L 3-4
1931/32	2nd Qualifying Round	H v Hersham	L 2-3
1932/33	1st Qualifying Round	H v Camberley & Yorktown	W 3-2
	2nd Qualifying Round	H v RASC Aldershot	L 0-1
1933/34	1st Qualifying Round	A v Godalming Town	W 3-1
	2nd Qualifying Round	A v RASC Aldershot	L 2-5
1934/35	1st Qualifying Round	A v Walton-on-Thames	W 1-0
	2nd Qualifying Round	H v RASC Aldershot	L 3-4
1935/36	1st Qualifying Round	H v Woking	L 2-6
1936/37	1st Qualifying Round	A v RAMC Aldershot	L 2-3

== Ground ==
Bass (Alton) played at the Bass Sports Ground, London Road, Alton.

The venue was enclosed with a large wooden stand, fixed pitch barrier, floodlights and pavilion. The 1935 FA Amateur Cup tie against Woking attracted a record crowd of 750.

The ground continued to be used by the merged club until 2015 when it was sold for housing. However, brewery owners Coors financed a return to a redeveloped Anstey Park (the former home of Alton Town, located just a short distance away).

== Local rivalries ==
Bass (Alton) enjoyed a healthy rivalry with number of clubs in the east Hampshire area including Liss Athletic, Petersfield United, Liphook and most notably Alton Town - with whom they eventually merged with.

== Successor Club ==
- See Alton F.C.
