= Micheldever F.C. =

Association football club in England

- Full name: Micheldever Football Club
- Nickname: Robins
- Founded: 1920 (Reformed in 1992)
- Dissolved: 2006
- Ground: Lord Rank Playing Field, Micheldever, Hampshire
Home colours	Away colours

Micheldever F.C. were a long running amateur football club based in Micheldever, a village and civil parish situated 6 miles north of Winchester in Hampshire, England.

== History ==
The original incarnation where known as Micheldever Village and were founded circa 1920. They were long serving members of the Winchester & District League before joining the newly formed Division 2 of the North Hants League in 1973, where they played for four seasons. They then returned to their Winchester roots but a lean spell during the mid-eighties saw them disband.

In 1992 the club was reformed as Micheldever, and made a successful return to the Winchester League by winning the Division 2 title and Northbrook Cup at the first attempt. 'The Robins' soon settled in Division 1, and after twice winning the title they moved up to the North Hants League, which they won in 1999.

This saw the club make a successful application to join the Hampshire League, and here they continued to prosper by winning the Division 2 title at the first attempt. Micheldever found Division 1 much harder, but they consolidated and gradually improved each season - finishing third in 2004.

Later that year, the competition was absorbed by the Wessex League and Micheldever were placed in the third tier. Despite a respectable mid-table position in their first season, like many others they struggled to meet the extra demands of the higher grade, and the loss of key personnel forced their withdrawal in February 2006.

Efforts to reform for the following campaign failed and the club ceased to exist.

== Honours ==
- Hampshire League
  - Division 2 Champions: 1999–00
- North Hants League
  - Champions: 1998–99
- Winchester & District League
  - Division 1 Champions: 1995–96, 1996–97
  - Division 2 Champions: 1992–93
  - Northbrook Cup Winners: 1992–93, 1994–95

== League career 1998–2006 ==
Season	Division	Position	Significant events
1998–99	North Hants League	1/10	Promoted
1999–2000	Hampshire League Division 2	1/14	Promoted
2000–01	Hampshire League Division 1	13/16	
2001–02	Hampshire League Division 1	8/16	
2002–03	Hampshire League Division 1	4/15	
2003–04	Hampshire League Division 1	4/15	Left competition
2004–05	Wessex League Division 3	9/22	
2005–06	Wessex League Division 3	17/17	Resigned

== Ground ==
Micheldever F.C. played at Lord Rank Playing Field, Duke Street, Micheldever, near Wincheter, Hampshire. SO31 3DF.

The venue is owned by Micheldever Parish Council and remains in use today. It has a modern pavilion with ample car parking.

== Local rivalries ==
Micheldever had a number of local rivals including Winchester City, Alresford Town and Winchester Castle. Meetings with these clubs always generated much local interest and attracted large crowds.
