= Basing Rovers F.C. =

English football club

- Full name: Basing Rovers Football Club
- Founded: 1886
- Dissolved: 2001
- Ground: Recreation Ground, Old Basing
| Home colours | Away colours |

Basing Rovers F.C. were a long running amateur football club based in Old Basing – a village located to the east of the town of Basingstoke in north Hampshire.

== History ==
The club were founded in 1886 as Old Basing and spent their early days playing friendly fixtures before becoming founder members of the Basingstoke & District League in 1903. They spent many years playing in the competition, enjoying much success along the way. In 1930 the club was renamed Basing Rovers and enjoyed plenty of success before progressing on the North Hants League.

In 1984, Basing Rovers won the title and made a successful application to join the Hampshire League Division 3 where they quickly settled. Sizeable crowds were regularly attracted to their home games and this warranted the formation of a Supporters Club.

Two years later, when a vast number of the competitions top clubs left en masse to create the Wessex League, Basing Rovers were then placed in a restructured Division 2, and a fifth place final placing was rewarded with an unexpected promotion to the top-flight.

The 1987/88 campaign was the most successful in the club's long history. They finished runners-up in Division 1 and won the Hampshire Intermediate Cup. However, the manager and players then left and they were relegated the following season.

Basing Rovers then became a steady Division 2 side, until 1996 when they finished rock-bottom and were relegated. The club continued to struggle in Division 3 and eventually withdrew midway through the 1999/00 season.

Basing Rovers continued to play, retaining their Reserves position in the Basingstoke & District League until financial problems forced them to disband in 2001. A phoenix club called Old Basing was later formed but the venture was short-lived.

== Honours ==
- Hampshire Football Association
  - Intermediate Cup Winners 1987/88
- Hampshire League
  - Division 1 Runners-up 1987/88
- North Hants League
  - Champions 1983/84
- Basingstoke & District League
  - Premier Division Champions 1982/83
  - Division 1 Champions 1920/21, 1929/30, 1935/36, 1936/37, 1937/38 and 1953/54. Runners-up 1905/06 and 1919/20
  - Division 2 Champions 1928/29, 1934/35 and 1949/50
  - Division 3 Champions 1952/53 (Reserves)
  - Senior Supplementary Cup Winners 1976/77 and 1982/83
  - Junior 'A' Cup Winners 1919/20, 1929/30, 1937/38 and 1983/84 (Reserves)
  - Junior 'B' Cup Winners 1933/34, 1934/35 and 1949/50

== Hampshire League record 1984–2000 ==
| Season | Division | Position | Pld | W | D | L | F | A | Pts | Notes |
|---|---|---|---|---|---|---|---|---|---|---|
| 1984/85 | Three | 9/18 | 34 | 13 | 6 | 15 | 48 | 47 | 32 | |
| 1985/86 | Three | 4/18 | 34 | 20 | 6 | 8 | 61 | 39 | 46 | League restructure at end of season |
| 1986/87 | Two | 5/18 | 32 | 15 | 10 | 7 | 58 | 32 | 40 | Promoted |
| 1987/88 | One | 2/18 | 34 | 22 | 5 | 7 | 69 | 29 | 49 | |
| 1988/89 | One | 17/17 | 32 | 7 | 5 | 20 | 36 | 63 | 19 | Relegated |
| 1989/90 | Two | 14/18 | 34 | 9 | 7 | 18 | 39 | 55 | 34 | 3 points for a win |
| 1990/91 | Two | 14/18 | 34 | 9 | 8 | 17 | 54 | 69 | 35 | |
| 1991/92 | Two | 10/15 | 26 | 9 | 7 | 12 | 54 | 55 | 34 | |
| 1992/93 | Two | 11/18 | 34 | 11 | 7 | 16 | 47 | 80 | 40 | |
| 1993/94 | Two | 7/17 | 32 | 15 | 7 | 10 | 64 | 58 | 52 | |
| 1994/95 | Two | 14/17 | 32 | 10 | 1 | 21 | 42 | 88 | 31 | |
| 1995/96 | Two | 18/18 | 34 | 1 | 3 | 30 | 34 | 157 | 6 | Relegated |
| 1996/97 | Three | 18/20 | 38 | 8 | 7 | 23 | 55 | 82 | 31 | |
| 1997/98 | Three | 16/16 | 30 | 2 | 1 | 27 | 42 | 131 | 7 | Re-elected |
| 1998/99 | Three | 12/18 | 34 | 9 | 10 | 15 | 57 | 70 | 37 | League restructure at end of season |
| 1999/00 | Two | 14/14 | 0 | 0 | 0 | 0 | 0 | 0 | 0 | withdrew – record expunged |

== Ground ==
Basing Rovers played their home games at the Recreation Ground, The Street, Old Basing, Hampshire. RG24 7DA.

The venue very much remains in use today. Owned by Old Basing & Lychpit Parish Council, it has two football pitches, a large modern pavilion with ample parking. The ground is now used by Basing Royals youth football club and by Old Basing Cricket Club.

During the 1993/94 season, Basing Rovers temporarily played at the Camrose Ground, home of Basingstoke Town F.C. whilst their pavilion was being refurbished.

== Local rivalries ==
During their existence, Basing Rovers enjoyed a long running local rivalry with a number of clubs in the area. These mostly included Sherbourne St John, Hadleigh, Bramley United and Hook.

== Successor club ==
The village is now represented by Basing Royals – a successful youth club founded in 2018.

Affiliated to the Hampshire Football Association, they are an Accredited Club and run numerous teams at various age groups. The club are ambitious to launch an adults side.
