= 2002–03 Wessex Football League =

Wessex Football League
- Season: 2002–03
- Champions: Eastleigh

The 2002–03 Wessex Football League was the 17th season of the Wessex Football League. The league champions for the first time in their history were Eastleigh, who were promoted to the Southern League. There was no relegation this season.

For sponsorship reasons, the league was known as the Jewson Wessex League.

== League table ==
The league consisted of one division of 22 clubs, reduced from 23 the previous season, after Fleet Town were promoted to the Southern League, Swanage Town & Herston were relegated and one new club joined:

- Alton Town, joining from the Hampshire League.

Pos	Team	Pld	W	D	L	GF	GA	GD	Pts	Qualification
1	Eastleigh (C, P)	42	32	7	3	115	32	+83	103	Joined the Southern League
2	Gosport Borough	42	27	7	8	94	43	+51	88	
3	A.F.C. Totton	42	27	6	9	96	47	+49	87	
4	Wimborne Town	42	26	7	9	113	44	+69	85	
5	Fareham Town	42	22	10	10	78	47	+31	76	
6	Lymington & New Milton	42	22	8	12	89	56	+33	74	
7	Andover	42	22	7	13	95	63	+32	73	
8	Portland United	42	20	8	14	81	62	+19	68	
9	Thatcham Town	42	18	13	11	68	58	+10	67	
10	Moneyfields	42	18	6	18	73	68	+5	60	
11	B.A.T. Sports	42	18	6	18	57	65	−8	60	
12	A.F.C. Newbury	42	17	6	19	77	72	+5	57	
13	Christchurch	42	15	10	17	58	68	−10	55	
14	Bournemouth	42	15	9	18	57	67	−10	54	
15	Cowes Sports	42	13	13	16	57	55	+2	52	
16	Hamble A.S.S.C.	42	13	12	17	58	60	−2	51	
17	Alton Town	42	14	9	19	71	80	−9	51	
18	Bemerton Heath Harlequins	42	13	5	24	59	83	−24	44	
19	Downton	42	10	7	25	41	105	−64	37	
20	Brockenhurst	42	7	6	29	50	116	−66	27	
21	Blackfield & Langley	42	4	6	32	37	134	−97	18	
22	Whitchurch United	42	3	4	35	25	124	−99	13	

(C) Champions; (P) Promoted
