= R.S. Basingstoke F.C. =

RS Basingstoke F.C.
- Full name: RS Basingstoke Football Club
- Nickname: Soldiers Return
- Founded: 1971
- Dissolved: 2005
- Ground: Whiteditch Playing Fields, Basingstoke
Home colours	Away colours

RS Basingstoke F.C. was a long running amateur football club based in Basingstoke, Hampshire.

== History ==
The club were founded in 1971 as Soldiers Return, and originally played Sunday football before switching to Saturdays where they joined the Basingstoke & District League. After successfully climbing up through the divisions the side became founder members of the Chiltonian League in 1984 where they remained for two seasons before joining the North Hants League, which they won in 1986–87 resulting in their application to join Hampshire League Division 2 being successful.

Upon election the team then became known as SR Basingstoke and promptly proceeded to win promotion as champions in their debut season and soon established themselves in Division 1. In 1990 the club became known as DCA Basingstoke and finished runners-up in 1990–91.

In 1992 the club successfully applied to move up to the Combined Counties League where they maintained a steady mid-table position but, due to ground grading, they dropped out after four seasons to rejoin the Chiltonian League. A year later, the club was renamed again as RS Basingstoke.

When the competition was absorbed by the extended Hellenic League in 2000, they were placed in Division 1 East and finished runners-up in their first season, but again due to ground grading were ineligible for promotion.

In 2003 RS Basingstoke returned to the Hampshire League where they were placed in Division 2, finishing in 3rd place, before joining the expanding Wessex League. This would be the seventh league that they had played in during their existence.

Despite holding a comfortable mid-table position in Division 3, a player exodus in January 2005 forced them to suddenly withdraw and fold.

== Honours ==
- Hellenic League
  - Division 1 East Runners-up 2000/01
- Hampshire League
  - Division 1 Runners-up 1990/91
  - Division 2 Champions 1987/88
- North Hants League
  - Champions 1986/87
- North Hants Football Association
  - Senior Cup Winners 1988/89
- Basingstoke & District League
  - Premier Division Champions 1980/81
  - Senior Cup Winners 1983/84, 1986/87, 1990/91, 1995/96, 2000/01 and 2001/02

== League career ==
Season	Division	Position	Significant events
1984/85	Chiltonian League	8/17	Founder Members
1985/86	Chiltonian League	4/10	Left competition
1986/87	North Hants League	1/12	Champions, promoted
1987/88	Hampshire League Division 2	1/19	Champions, promoted
1988/89	Hampshire League Division 1	8/17	
1989/90	Hampshire League Division 1	12/18	
1990/91	Hampshire League Division 1	2/19	Runners-up, not promoted
1991/92	Hampshire League Division 1	6/18	Promoted
1992/93	Combined Counties League	13/19	
1993/94	Combined Counties League	6/21	
1994/95	Combined Counties League	9/18	
1995/96	Combined Counties League	14/22	Demoted on ground grading
1996/97	Chiltonian League	6/18	
1997/98	Chiltonian League	3/18	
1998/99	Chiltonian League	7/13	
1999/00	Chiltonian League	5/17	Competition absorbed by Hellenic League in 2000
2000/01	Hellenic League Division 1 East	2/17	Runners-up, not promoted
2001/02	Hellenic League Division 1 East	3/17	
2002/03	Hellenic League Division 1 East	11/17	Left competition
2003/04	Hampshire League Division 2	3/15	Competition absorbed by Wessex League
2004/05	Wessex League Division 2	21/22	Left competition

== Ground ==
RS Basingstoke played at Whiteditch Playing Fields, Sherborne Road, Basingstoke, RG21 5UT. The venue remains in use today.

== Local rivals ==
Having played in such a variety of leagues, RS Basingstoke had many rivalries during their existence, but neighbours Basingstoke Town and Tadley Calleva were always considered as their main rivals.
