= Recreation Ground (Aldershot) =

Football stadium in Aldershot, England

Coordinates: 51°14′54″N 0°45′17″W

- The Rec
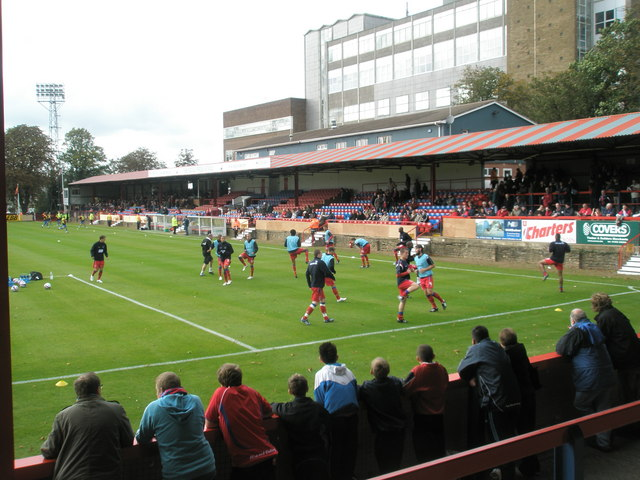
- Interactive map of Recreation Ground
- Location: High Street; Aldershot; Hampshire; GU11 1TW
- Owner: Rushmoor Borough Council
- Operator: Aldershot Town Football Club
- Capacity: 7,100 (2000 Seated); East Bank: 4,180; North Stand: 1,540; South Stand: 880; South West Terrace: 500
- Surface: Grass
- Field size: 117 by 76 yards (107 m × 69 m)

Construction
- Opened: 1927

Tenants
- Aldershot (1927–1992); Aldershot Town (1992–present); Chelsea Reserves (2004–2007, 2013-2020)

The Recreation Ground, currently known as The EBB Stadium at The Recreation Ground for sponsorship reasons and informally known as The Rec, is a football ground in Aldershot, Hampshire, England. Football matches have been played there since 1927 when Aldershot (later reformed as Aldershot Town) was founded. The ground hosted league football between 1932 and 1992 when Aldershot were members of the Football League. Its current tenants Aldershot Town have used the ground since forming in 1992 and the ground once again hosted league football between 2008 and 2013.

The ground currently has a capacity of 7,100, though the record attendance at the ground is 19,138, recorded when Aldershot played Carlisle United on 28 January 1970 in an FA Cup replay.

== Current capacity ==
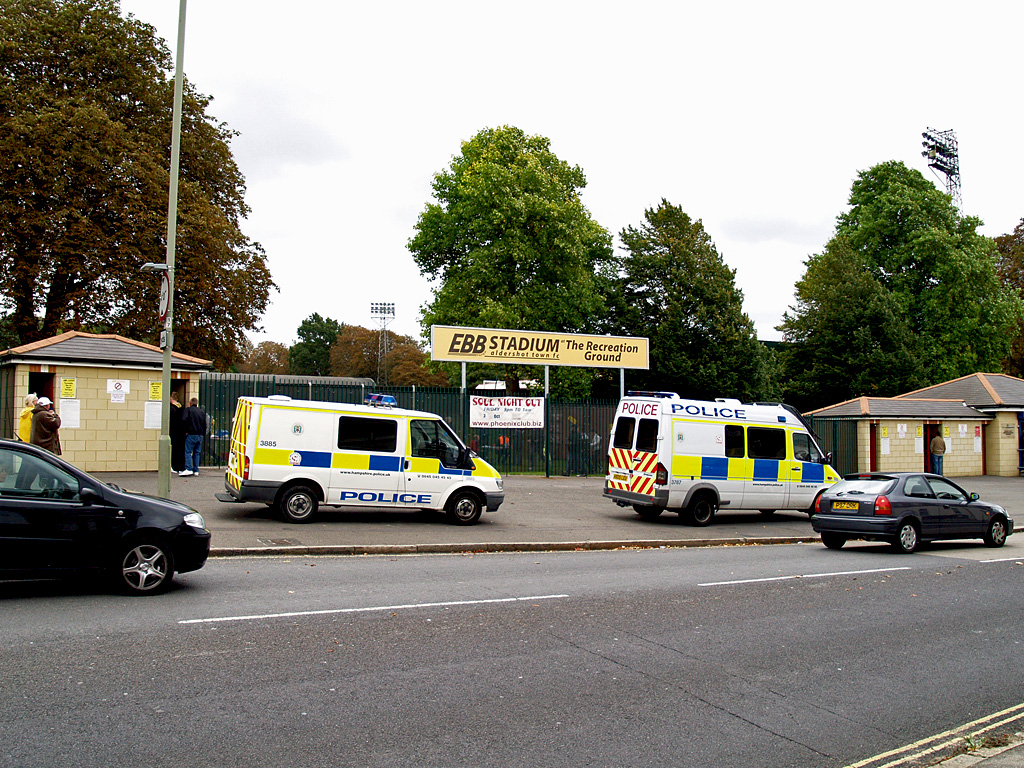
Main entrance to the EBB Stadium

The capacity of the ground was reduced at the end of the 2007–2008 season to 7,100. This includes a total away allocation of 1,100 of which around 250 is seated. The capacity was previously set at 7,500, however promotion to the Football League meant changes were introduced which resulted in the capacity being reduced.

Approximate capacity breakdown:

- South Side: 1,580
- East Bank: 4,180
- North Stand: 1,740
- High Street End: 200

Total: 7,600

== History ==
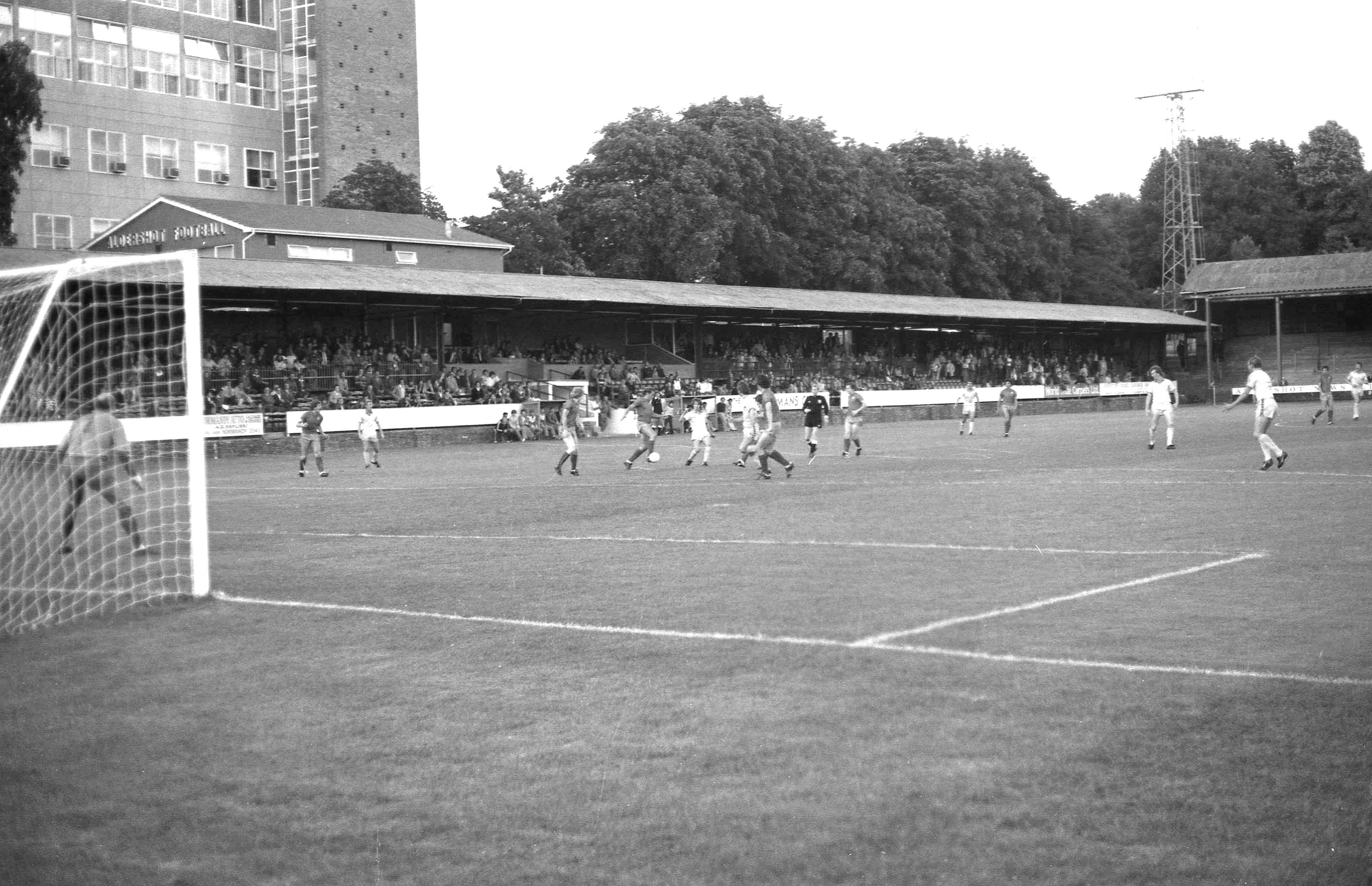
Recreation Ground in 1982

=== Aldershot F.C. era ===
Aldershot F.C. adopted the "Rec" as their home ground upon formation in December 1926. The Recreation Ground was owned by the local council and situated on Aldershot High Street. The first stand, the south stand, was opened at the beginning of the 1929–30 season and still remains today. A crowd of 3,522 witnessed the shots record a 2–1 victory over Norwich City on the day of its opening. The club's last game there was in the Football League Fourth Division against Lincoln City on 14 March 1992 – eleven days before their demise. However, one more competitive game did follow for the club – against Cardiff City, also in the league, at Ninian Park.

=== Aldershot Town F.C. era ===
After the demise of Aldershot, the Recreation Ground remained without any tenants. Aldershot Town were formed soon after and consequently chose to adopt the Recreation Ground as their home.

In March 2018, Aldershot Town presented proposals for the redevelopment of the EBB Stadium to Rushmoor Borough Council which would see the potential development of a new stadium, containing both seating and standing areas, that will give the club a "long-term home from which to build our ambitions on the pitch".

== Attendances ==
=== Club attendances from 1992 to 2009 ===
Average attendances since 1992.

Season	League	Highest attendance	Lowest attendance	Average attendance	Rank	Season on season increase
1992–93	Isthmian League Third Division	2,873	1,493	2,076	1st	N/A
1993–94	Isthmian League Second Division	3,301	1,259	1,891	1st	-8.9%
1994–95	Isthmian League First Division	2,920	1,459	1,853	1st	-2.0%
1995–96	Isthmian League First Division	2,141	1,180	1,643	1st	-15.3%
1996–97	Isthmian League First Division	2,232	1,285	1,652	1st	+5.2%
1997–98	Isthmian League First Division	4,289	1,122	2,249	1st	+20.7%
1998–99	Isthmian League Premier Division	2,798	1,207	1,995	1st	+0.1%
1999–00	Isthmian League Premier Division	5,518	1,336	2,070	1st	+3.7%
2000–01	Isthmian League Premier Division	3,197	1,218	1,973	1st	-4.7%
2001–02	Isthmian League Premier Division	2,630	1,505	1,902	1st	-3.6%
2002–03	Isthmian League Premier Division	3,419	1,694	2,067	1st	+4.4%
2003–04	Football Conference	4,637	2,412	3,303	4th	+66.4%
2004–05	Football Conference	4,458	1,923	3,043	4th	-7.9%
2005–06	Football Conference	3,136	1,645	2,294	5th	-24.6%
2006–07	Football Conference	3,621	1,734	2,360	5th	+2.9%
2007–08	Football Conference	5,980	1,779	3,074	5th	+30.3%
2008–09	League Two	5,023	2,090	3,276	16th	+6.6%

=== Record attendances ===
The following table summarises the top 10 attendances at the recreation ground for Aldershot Town, since reformation in 1992).

Attendance	Versus	Competition	Season
7,500	Brighton & Hove Albion	FA Cup First Round	2000-01
7,058	Woking	FA Trophy semi-final	2024-25
7,044	Manchester United	Football League Cup Fourth Round	2011-12
6,870	Woking	FA Cup Fourth Qualifying Round	1998-99
6,617	Carlisle United	Conference National Play-off semi-final	2004-05
6,379	Hereford United	Conference National Play-off semi-final	2003-04
5,980	Weymouth	Conference National	2007-08
5,970	Woking	Vanarama National League	2023-24
5,961	Farnborough Town	Hampshire Senior Cup semi-final	1992-93
5,791	Burton Albion	Conference National	2007-08

== Facilities ==
=== North Stand ===
This is the main stand of the Ground along one side of the pitch. It houses players changing rooms and the club's director's box and media center. Adjoined to the North stand is the club offices, which were used by both Aldershot F.C. and Aldershot Town F.C. directors. There is also a conference room and bar adjacent to the offices and behind the North stand which was built in the early 2000s. Originally it was used as a bar for supporters on matchdays until the club acquired the Black Bull Inn during the 2007–2008 season. As a result, it is mainly used for corporate hospitality.

The stand itself features a combination of terracing and seating:

- To the east of the stand is a large terraced area.
- To the west of the stand is a large terraced area with a disabled bay.
- In the centre of the stand is a large seated area, directors' area and media centre. Originally this was terraced before gradually seating replaced the terracing. However one small area to the west of the central area is still terraced and has yet to face conversion to seating.

=== East Bank ===
East Bank is the largest stand of the Recreation Ground capable of holding several thousand fans. The design of the stand is unusual as it is not like most stands that have a flat roof, instead the stand roof is a barrel-shaped roof towards the rear, with a flat roof covering the lower parts of the East Bank. This is so because the East Bank originally had just the barrel shaped roof and it was not until later that a front flat roof was put on to cover the lower half of the East Bank.

=== South Stand ===
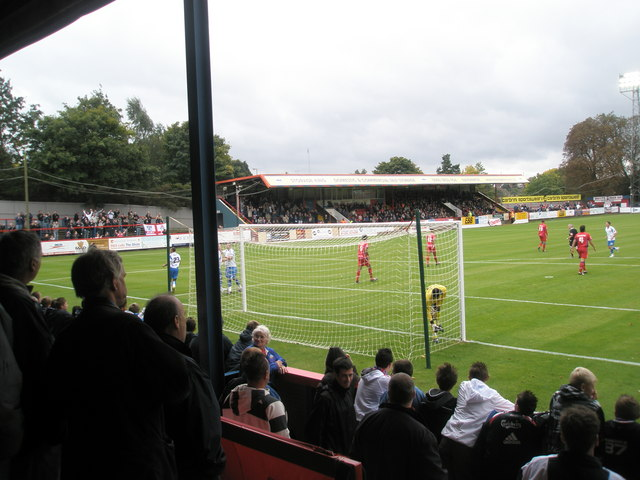
South Stand viewed from the East Bank

The South Stand is the only all-seated stand at the ground, accommodating both home and away fans. The stand is the oldest at the ground, having been opened in the late 1920s shortly after Aldershot F.C. was formed. It has remained fairly untouched over the past 70 years, although an increase in ground safety regulations (especially after the Taylor report) has meant that some minor work has been carried out in order for the stand to remain in use.

Either side of the stand are open terraces. One of which is used by home fans – the south west terrace (known amongst fans as "The Slab") – and the other used by away fans.

=== High Street End ===
Due to Football League regulations the High Street end is no longer accessible for supporters on match days. However, provision can be made for expanded capacity, as it was for the League Cup tie with Manchester United on 25 October 2011, where an extra 200 fans were allowed access, hence bringing capacity up to 7,300.

== Other uses ==
- Reading Reserves – for the 2007–2008 season only.
- Chelsea Reserves – from the 2004–2005 to 2006–2007 season and from the 2013–2014 to 2019–2020 season.
- England U17s
- Army F.C.
- Aldershot Town Reserves
- Also hosts Aldershot and District League Cup Competition Final

== Records ==
Aldershot Town and the Recreation Ground hold the following attendance records in certain leagues or cup competitions.

League or Cup competition	Attendance	Opponent
Isthmian League Division 1	4289	Berkhamsted Town
Isthmian League Division 2	3301	Newbury Town
Isthmian League Division 3	2873	Collier Row
FA Trophy 3rd Qualifying Round	2003	Rothwell Town
FA Vase Preliminary Round	1701	Gosport Borough
FA Vase 5th Round	3420	Wimborne Town
FA Vase 6th Round	4439	Atherton Laburnum Rovers
