= 2016–17 Spartan South Midlands Football League =

The 2016–17 Spartan South Midlands Football League season was the 20th in the history of Spartan South Midlands Football League, a football competition in England.

== Premier Division ==
Spartan South Midlands Football League Premier Division
- Season: 2016–17
- Champions: London Colney
- Promoted: Hertford Town
- Relegated: Broxbourne Borough
- Matches: 462
- Goals: 1,614 (3.49 per match)

The Premier Division featured 19 clubs which competed in the division last season, along with three new clubs:

- Crawley Green, promoted from Division One
- Edgware Town, promoted from Division One
- Leighton Town, relegated from the Southern Football League

=== League table ===
Pos	Team	Pld	W	D	L	GF	GA	GD	Pts	Promotion or relegation
1	London Colney	42	31	4	7	110	45	+65	97	
2	Hertford Town	42	28	8	6	91	35	+56	92	Promoted to the Isthmian League North Division
3	Cockfosters	42	27	7	8	90	48	+42	88	
4	Wembley	42	23	6	13	115	73	+42	75	
5	Tring Athletic	42	23	6	13	78	54	+24	75	
6	Welwyn Garden City	42	21	10	11	87	66	+21	73	
7	Hoddesdon Town	42	20	9	13	93	69	+24	69	
8	Berkhamsted	42	21	6	15	77	56	+21	69	
9	Biggleswade United	42	19	11	12	57	47	+10	68	
10	Sun Sports	42	18	10	14	77	73	+4	64	
11	Crawley Green	42	18	6	18	63	76	−13	60	
12	Leverstock Green	42	16	10	16	85	76	+9	58	
13	Stotfold	42	14	10	18	66	77	−11	52	
14	Holmer Green	42	13	10	19	56	60	−4	49	
15	Oxhey Jets	42	13	10	19	68	84	−16	49	
16	Leighton Town	42	14	5	23	68	82	−14	47	
17	Edgware Town	42	11	10	21	61	88	−27	43	
18	Colney Heath	42	12	7	23	62	100	−38	43	
19	Hadley	42	9	12	21	57	79	−22	39	
20	St Margaretsbury	42	9	11	22	60	92	−32	38	
21	London Tigers	42	8	7	27	46	109	−63	31	
22	Broxbourne Borough	42	4	5	33	47	125	−78	17	Relegated to Division One

Source: FA Full-Time
Rules for classification: 1) Points; 2) Goal difference; 3) Number of goals scored; 4) Number of matches won; 5) Head-to-head results

== Division One ==
Spartan South Midlands Football League Division One
- Season: 2016–17
- Champions: Biggleswade
- Promoted: Biggleswade; Harpenden Town
- Matches: 420
- Goals: 1,750 (4.17 per match)

Division One featured 21 club in the division for this season, of which there are five new clubs:

- Bedford, relegated from the Premier Division
- Biggleswade, new club
- Hadley Wood & Wingate, joined from the Herts County League
- Harefield United, relegated from the Premier Division
- Kensington Borough, promoted from Division Two, with a name change from AFC Hillgate

=== League table ===
Pos	Team	Pld	W	D	L	GF	GA	GD	Pts	Promotion or relegation
1	Biggleswade	40	32	3	5	140	45	+95	99	Promoted to the Premier Division
2	Harpenden Town	40	29	6	5	108	37	+71	93	Promoted to the Premier Division
3	Baldock Town	40	29	5	6	109	45	+64	92	
4	Langford	40	24	5	11	109	72	+37	77	
5	Southall	40	24	4	12	110	64	+46	76	
6	Risborough Rangers	40	21	8	11	93	58	+35	71	
7	Wodson Park	40	21	7	12	71	49	+22	70	
8	Harefield United	40	20	8	12	82	47	+35	68	
9	Hillingdon Borough	40	21	4	15	114	66	+48	67	
10	Buckingham Athletic	40	21	3	16	76	68	+8	66	
11	Broadfields United	40	20	4	16	102	74	+28	64	
12	Kensington Borough	40	16	8	16	93	83	+10	56	Transferred to the Combined Counties League
13	Codicote	40	13	4	23	65	88	−23	43	
14	Ampthill Town	40	13	3	24	73	109	−36	42	
15	Chesham United reserves	40	12	4	24	70	101	−31	40	Resigned from the league
16	Winslow United	40	11	5	24	53	111	−58	38	
17	Brimsdown	40	10	7	23	84	133	−49	37	
18	Hadley Wood & Wingate	40	12	4	24	60	116	−56	37 (Note: Hadley Wood & Wingate were deducted three points on 14 December for an infringement of league rules.)	Resigned from the league
19	Bedford	40	10	2	28	42	105	−63	32	
20	Hatfield Town	40	9	4	27	57	115	−58	31	
21	Arlesey Town reserves	40	2	2	36	39	164	−125	8	Resigned from the league

Source: FA Full-Time
Rules for classification: 1) Points; 2) Goal difference; 3) Number of goals scored; 4) Number of matches won; 5) Head-to-head results

== Division Two ==
Spartan South Midlands Football League Division Two
- Season: 2016–17
- Champions: Thame Rangers
- Promoted: Enfield Borough; St Neots Town reserves Thame Rangers
- Matches: 306
- Goals: 1,321 (4.32 per match)

Division Two featured twelve clubs which competed in the division last season, along with six new clubs:

- Enfield Borough, new club
- MK Gallacticos, joined from the North Bucks & District League
- New Bradwell St Peter, demoted from Division One
- St Neots Town reserves
- Thame Rangers, joined from the Wycombe & District League
- Tring Town, new club

Also, Wolverton Town changed name to Unite MK.

=== League table ===
Pos	Team	Pld	W	D	L	GF	GA	GD	Pts	Promotion
1	Thame Rangers	34	28	2	4	127	38	+89	86	Promoted to Hellenic League Division One East
2	Totternhoe	34	26	0	8	108	45	+63	78	
3	Enfield Borough	34	19	7	8	85	37	+48	64	Promoted to Division One
4	Aston Clinton	34	21	4	9	81	45	+36	64 (Note: Aston Clinton were deducted 3 points.)	
5	Old Bradwell United	34	19	4	11	85	63	+22	61	
6	MK Gallacticos	34	20	3	11	101	70	+31	60 (Note: MK Gallacticos were deducted 3 points.)	
7	New Bradwell St Peter	34	17	8	9	85	48	+37	59	Resigned from the league
8	Loughton Manor	34	18	5	11	64	57	+7	59	
9	St Neots Town reserves	34	17	6	11	80	62	+18	57	Promoted to Division One
10	Pitstone & Ivinghoe United	34	16	4	14	87	85	+2	52	
11	The 61	34	13	8	13	67	64	+3	47	
12	Unite MK	34	14	3	17	64	85	−21	45	
13	Mursley United	34	11	3	20	64	88	−24	36	
14	Grendon Rangers	34	9	3	22	46	96	−50	30	
15	Tring Corinthians	34	7	8	19	56	96	−40	29	
16	Amersham Town	34	6	5	23	49	99	−50	23	
17	Tring Town	34	4	2	28	33	110	−77	14	
18	Clean Slate	34	2	3	29	39	133	−94	9	

Source: FA Full-Time
Rules for classification: 1) points; 2) goal difference; 3) number of goals scored.
