= Thornycroft Athletic F.C. =

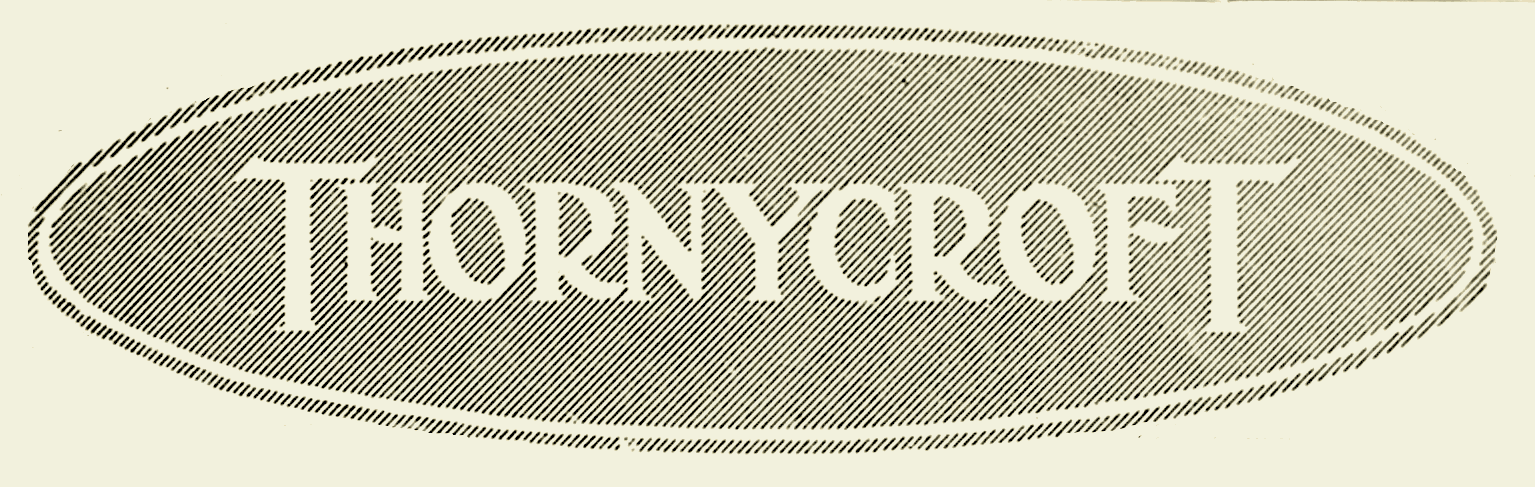
- Full name: Thornycroft Athletic Football Club
- Nickname: The Motors
- Founded: 1900
- Dissolved: 1972
- Ground: West Ham Park, Worting Road, Basingstoke
Home colours	Away colours

Thornycroft Athletic was a works football club based in Basingstoke, Hampshire.

For many years they played in the Hampshire League but were forced to close in 1972 - just three years after winning the title following the loss of their ground, due to the companies relocation and subsequent takeover.

== History ==
Thornycroft Athletic were formed in 1900, as the works side of the Basingtoke-based Thornycroft vehicle manufacturing company. They spent their early days playing friendly fixtures before becoming founder members of the Basingstoke & District League in 1903, where they won the inaugural title and retained it the following season. In 1912 they won the league and cup double.

That same year, 'Thorneys' joined the North Division of the Hampshire League but in their first two seasons they twice finished bottom. After the Great War they were placed in the County Division (later to become Division 1) and in 1921 they finished runners-up, and also reached the final of the Hampshire Senior Cup where they beaten by Southampton Reserves. Thornycrofts remained in the top flight before being relegated in 1931–32 and after finishing mid-table in Division 2 the following season, the side withdrew from the competition to join the Southern Amateur League, winning the Senior Division 3 title in 1934–35.

When normal football resumed after World War II, Thornycrofts returned to the Hampshire League and were placed in Division 1. The post-war era saw the club remain in the league and were regular entrants in the qualifying rounds of the national cup competitions but relegation in 1950–51 saw a decline in fortunes. After several years of re-building Thornycrofts won the Division 2 title in 1955–56 and returned to Division 1 where they remained for three seasons before again being relegated.

The early sixties saw 'the Motors' alternate between Divisions 1 and 2 but won promotion back as runners-up in 1963–64. Back in the top flight, Thornycrofts won the title in 1968–69, three points clear of local rivals Basingstoke Town – whom they often played against in front of large crowds. Also at this time they also enjoyed extended runs in the qualifying rounds of the FA Cup and FA Trophy.

However, it all came to an end in 1972 when Thornycrofts closed their Basingstoke factory and relocated to Watford, where the company was taken over by Scammell Lorries. Consequently, this resulted in West Ham Park being sold and the club forced to fold.

== Honours ==
- Hampshire League
  - Division 1 Champions 1968/69 and Runners-up 1920/21
  - Division 2 Champions 1955/56 and Runners-up 1963/64
- Southern Amateur Football League
  - Senior Division 3 Champions 1934/35
  - Reserve Division 3 Champions 1933/34
- Hampshire Football Association
  - Senior Cup Finalists 1920/21
  - Russell Cotes Cup Winners 1924/25 and 1966/67
- North Hants Football Association
  - May Cup Winners 1919/20 and 1920/21
- Basingstoke & District League
  - Division 1 Champions 1903/04, 1904/05, 1911/12 and 1926/27 (Reserves). Runners-up 1928/29 (Reserves)
  - Division 2 Champions 1926/27 (Third team)
  - Junior 'A' Cup Winners 1910/11, 1911/12 and 1931/32 (Reserves)
  - Junior 'B' Cup Winners 1926/27 (Third team)

== Playing records ==
=== League career ===
Season	Division	Position	Significant events
1905-12	Basingstoke & District League		
1912/13	Hampshire League North Division	7/7	Re-elected
1913/14	Hampshire League North Division	6/6	Re-elected
1919/20	Hampshire League North Division	5/6	
1920/21	Hampshire League County Division	2/12	Runners-up
1921/22	Hampshire League County Division	13/16	
1922/23	Hampshire League County Division	13/17	
1923/24	Hampshire League County Division	4/16	
1924/25	Hampshire League County Division	7/16	
1925/26	Hampshire League County Division	3/16	
1926/27	Hampshire League County Division	13/16	
1927/28	Hampshire League County Division	8/16	
1928/29	Hampshire League North Division	7/10	
1929/30	Hampshire League Division 1	13/16	
1930/31	Hampshire League Division 1	8/16	
1931/32	Hampshire League Division 1	16/16	Relegated
1932/33	Hampshire League Division 2	9/13	Left competition
1933/34	Southern Amateur League Senior Division 3	5/10	
1934/35	Southern Amateur League Senior Division 3	1/10	Champions, promoted
1935/36	Southern Amateur League Senior Division 2	9/10	Not relegated
1936/37	Southern Amateur League Senior Division 2	6/10	
1937/38	Southern Amateur League Senior Division 2	4/10	
1938/39	Southern Amateur League Senior Division 2	6/10	Left competition
1945/46	Hampshire League Division 1	12/16	
1946/47	Hampshire League Division 1	10/14	
1947/48	Hampshire League Division 1	10/14	
1948/49	Hampshire League Division 1	6/14	
1949/50	Hampshire League Division 1	12/14	
1950/51	Hampshire League Division 1	14/14	Relegated
1951/52	Hampshire League Division 2	8/14	
1952/53	Hampshire League Division 2	14/14	Not relegated
1953/54	Hampshire League Division 2	6/14	
1954/55	Hampshire League Division 2	3/14	
1955/56	Hampshire League Division 2	1/14	Champions, promoted
1956/57	Hampshire League Division 1	7/14	
1957/58	Hampshire League Division 1	12/14	
1958/59	Hampshire League Division 1	13/14	Relegated
1959/60	Hampshire League Division 2	5/16	
1960/61	Hampshire League Division 2	3/16	Promoted
1961/62	Hampshire League Division 1	15/16	Relegated
1962/63	Hampshire League Division 2	14/16	
1963/64	Hampshire League Division 2	2/16	Runners-up, promoted
1964/65	Hampshire League Division 1	5/16	
1965/66	Hampshire League Division 1	14/16	
1966/67	Hampshire League Division 1	9/16	
1967/68	Hampshire League Division 1	10/16	
1968/69	Hampshire League Division 1	1/16	Champions
1969/70	Hampshire League Division 1	7/16	
1970/71	Hampshire League Division 1	3/16	
1971/72	Hampshire League Division 1	5/16	Left competition

=== FA Cup ===
Season	Round	Opponents	Result
1914/15	1st Qualifying Round	A v Eastleigh Athletic	W 8-4
	2nd Qualifying Round	H v Boscombe	L 1–6
1919/20	Preliminary Round	H v Salisbury City	D 1–1
	Replay	A v Salisbury City	W 4-0
	1st Qualifying Round	A v Portsmouth Amateurs	L 0–5
1920/21	Preliminary Round	H v Sholing Athletic	L 1-2
1921/22	Extra-Preliminary Round	H v Eastleigh Athletic	W 3–1
1923/24	Extra-Preliminary Round	A v Kingstonian	L 1-3
1924/25	Preliminary Round	A v Bournemouth	L 2-4
1925/26	Preliminary Round	A v Southampton Civil Service	L 3-4
1926/27	Preliminary Round	A v Egham	W 6-3
	1st Qualifying Round	A v Addlestone	D 4-4
	Replay	H v Addlestone	W 6-1
	2nd Qualifying Round	A v Farnham United Breweries	W 3-2
	3rd Qualifying Round	A v Woking	L 1-5
1927/28	1st Qualifying Round	H v Farnham United Breweries	W 3-0
	2nd Qualifying Round	H v Aldershot Traction Co	W 2-0
	3rd Qualifying Round	A v Aldershot	L 1-3
1928/29	Preliminary Round	A v Addlestone	W 5-3
	1st Qualifying Round	A v RAMC Aldershot	W 5-4
	2nd Qualifying Round	H v Aldershot Traction Co	L 0-6
1929/30	1st Qualifying Round	H v RAMC Aldershot	L 2-3
1930/31	Preliminary Round	A v Courage & Co	L 2-4
1931/32	Preliminary Round	A v Camberley & Yorktown	L 0-2
1932/33	Preliminary Round	A v RAMC Aldershot	L 2-4
1933/34	Preliminary Round	A v Staines Town	L 2-4
1934/35	Extra-Preliminary Round	H v Beddington Corner	W 5-4
	Preliminary Round	A v Winchester City	L 1-5
1936/37	Extra-Preliminary Round	A v Basingstoke Town	L 0-8
1937/38	Preliminary Round	H v Salisbury City	L 1-8
1938/39	Preliminary Round	H v Salisbury Corinthians	L 0-2
1946/47	Preliminary Round	H v Andover	W 2–0
	1st Qualifying Round	H v RAOC Hilsea	L 1–2
1947/48	Preliminary Round	A v Bitterne Nomads	W 3–2
	1st Qualifying Round	A v Ryde Sports	L 0–3
1948/49	Preliminary Round	A v RAOC Hilsea	W 3–2
	1st Qualifying Round	A v Longfleet St Mary's	L 0–4
1949/50	Extra-Preliminary Round	H v Sandown	W 5–0
	Preliminary Round	A v Bournemouth	L 2–5
1950/51	Extra-Preliminary Round	H v Pirelli General	D 5-5
	Replay	A v Pirelli General	L 2–3
1967/68	1st Qualifying Round	A v Cowes	L 1–2
1968/69	1st Qualifying Round	A v Cowes	W 1–0
	2nd Qualifying Round	A v Salisbury City	L 0–4
1969/70	1st Qualifying Round	H v Salisbury City	L 3–4
1970/71	Preliminary Round	A v Fareham Town	W 2–1
	1st Qualifying Round	A v Waterlooville	D 1-1
	Replay	H v Waterlooville	D 0-0
	2nd Replay	A v Waterlooville	L 0–1
1971/72	1st Qualifying Round	A v Ryde Sports	W 4–1
	2nd Qualifying Round	H v Newport (IOW)	W 4–1
	3rd Qualifying Round	A v Fareham Town	L 1–5

=== FA Amateur Cup ===
Season	Round	Opponents	Result
1919/20	2nd Qualifying Round	A v Walton-on-Thames	L 0-2
1925/26	Preliminary Round	H v Godalming	W 5-1
	1st Qualifying Round	H v Walton-on-Thames	W 8-1
	2nd Qualifying Round	H v 10th Royal Hussars	W 6–4
	3rd Qualifying Round	H v 2nd Rifle Brigade	L 2–5
1928/29	Preliminary Round	A v Egham	L 2-4
1935/36	1st Qualifying Round	A v Egham	L 0-7
1936/37	Preliminary Round	H v Camberley & Yorktown	L 2-3
1937/38	Preliminary Round	H v Hersham	L 0-3
1938/39	Preliminary Round	H v RAMC Aldershot	L 1-5
1948/49	Extra-Preliminary Round	H v Botley	W 2-1
	Preliminary Round	H v Portsmouth Electricity	L 4-8
1949/50	Preliminary Round	A v Poole Town	L 1-4
1950/51	Extra-Preliminary Round	H v 2nd Training Battalion RASC	W 5-2
	Preliminary Round	A v Bournemouth	L 0-3
1951/52	Extra-Preliminary Round	H v RAMC Aldershot	L 1-6
1952/53	Preliminary Round	H v HMS Daedalus	L 1-3
1955/56	Preliminary Round	H v Gosport Borough	L 3-4
1956/57	Preliminary Round	A v Gosport Borough	L 1-5
1957/58	Preliminary Round	H v Totton	D 1-1
	Replay	A v Totton	W 4-2
	1st Qualifying Round	A v Bournemouth Gasworks	L 1-2

=== FA Trophy ===
Season	Round	Opponents	Result
1969/70	1st Qualifying Round	A v Rugby Town	D 2-2
	Replay	H v Rugby Town	L 4-5 *re-instated
	2nd Qualifying Round	H v St Neots Town	D 1-1
	Replay	A v St Neots Town	W 2–0
	3rd Qualifying Round	H v Margate	W 2–0
	1st Round	A v Weymouth	L 0–5
1970/71	3rd Qualifying Round	H v Bedford Town	D 1-1
	Replay	A v Bedford Town	L 0–1
1971/72	3rd Qualifying Round	H v King's Lynn	L 1–2

== Ground ==
Thornycroft Athletic played at West Ham Park, Worting Road, Basingstoke. The privately owned venue was fully enclosed with covered accommodation for spectators.

The record attendance is unknown, but local derby matches against Basingstoke Town often attracted crowds of over a thousand.

The ground was closed in 1972 after the company's relocation and subsequent takeover. With the town expanding at a rapid rate, the land was quickly sold for housing development.

== Notable players ==
Members of the successful sixties side included Taffy Davies and Ted Pearce, both of whom later enjoyed long successful spells as managers of north Hampshire rivals Basingstoke Town and Farnborough Town.

- See also Thornycroft Athletic players

== Local rivals ==
The club enjoyed a long running fierce rivalry with neighbours Basingstoke Town and their meetings always attracted much local interest. However, after 'Thorneys' disbanded, a number of club officials and supporters joined their rivals, who had recently progressed on to the Southern League.

== Print ==
- The Story of the Basingstoke Derby Match: Basingstoke Town V. Thornycroft Athletic 1900–72 by Kevin Smallbone.
