= Bagshot F.C. =

Association football club in England

Coordinates: 51°18′26″N 0°43′41″W

Bagshot
- Full name: Bagshot Football Club
- Nickname: The Baggies
- Founded: 1906
- Ground: Frimley Green Recreation Ground
- Capacity: 2,000 (100 seated)
- Chairman: Stuart Morgan
- League: Surrey Premier League
- 2025–26: Surrey Premier League, 13th of 14
Home colours	Away colours

Bagshot Football Club is a football club based in Frimley Green, near Camberley in Surrey, England. They are currently members of the Surrey Premier League and groundshare with Frimley Green at Frimley Green Recreation Ground.

== History ==
The club was established in 1906, and initially played in the Ascot & District League and the Woking & District League. In 1982 they moved up to Division Two of the Surrey County Intermediate League (Western) when it was expanded to three divisions. They went on to earn promotion from Division Three and Division Two in successive seasons, becoming members of Division One in 1984. In 1986–87 the club were Senior Division champions and were promoted to the Surrey Premier League.

After leaving the Surrey Premier League, Bagshot later joined to the Aldershot & District League. After winning Division Two in 2005–06 they were promoted to Division One, which they won in 2008–09, earning promotion to the Senior Division. They subsequently won the Senior Division and the Surrey Intermediate Cup in 2011–12, before going on to win both the Senior Division and Senior Division Cup double in both 2012–13 and 2013–14.

After winning the Senior Division again in 2015–16, they were promoted to Division One of the Combined Counties Football League. In 2023–24 they finished bottom of Division One and were relegated back to the Surrey Premier County League. In 2025–26 the club finished bottom of the Surrey Premier County League but were reprieved from relegation.

== Ground ==
During the club's time in the Combined Counties League they played at Camberley Town's Krooner Park. In 2026 they relocated to the Frimley Green Recreation Ground after agreeing a three-year groundshare with Frimley Green.

== Honours ==
- Surrey County Intermediate League (Western)
  - Division One champions 1986–87
- Aldershot & District League
  - Senior Division Champions 2011–12, 2012–13, 2013–14, 2015–16
  - Division One champions 2008–09
  - Division Two champions 2005–06
  - Senior Division Cup winners 2012–13, 2013–14
- Surrey Intermediate Cup
  - Winners 2011–12
