= A.F.C. Newbury =

- Full name: Association Football Club; Newbury
- Founded: 1996
- Dissolved: 2006
- Ground: Town Ground, Faraday Road, Newbury, Berkshire
- Capacity: 2,500
| Home colours | Away colours |

A.F.C. Newbury were a short lived semi-professional football club based in Newbury, Berkshire, in England. At their peak they were a strong force in the Wessex League and had over 30 teams from seven years old through to veterans including junior teams, a senior squad, a ladies and several girls teams competing in national, regional and local football leagues and competitions throughout the year. However, it all came to an abrupt end in 2006 when the club lost their ground and financial backing.

== History ==
AFC Newbury were formed in 1996 to replace the now defunct Newbury Town and bring senior football back to Faraday Road.

The new club was formed from the resources of three local clubs – Ecchinswell (founded 1906), Shaw Boys & Belles Juniors (established in 1972) and Wickham U17 Youth Team.

Ecchinswell had a long history playing in the Basingstoke League and North Hants League, before joining the Hampshire League Division 3 in 1991. After a slow start their fortunes dramatically took off when they won the Division 2 and Division 1 titles in 1993/94 and 1994/95 seasons. However they were unable to progress further due to the lack of facilities at their ground so upon formation of AFC Newbury they became the new club's First Team.

AFC Newbury quickly achieved promotion after finishing runners-up in 1996/97 and winning the League Cup – defeating run-away league champions Moneyfields 2–0 in the final.

Upon joining the Wessex League they soon became a strong force, twice finishing third and regularly found towards the top of the table in what was a tough league. After finishing third in 1998/99 the club applied for promotion to the Southern League but were unsuccessful.

The club continued to thrive with a Reserve team competing in the Combination of the Wessex League, winning the Combination Cup in 2002/03. The U18's Youth Team played in the Allied Counties Youth League with the extensive range of junior boys and girls teams played in the Peter Houseman League, the South Chiltern Minor League, the Bracknell League and the Vale & District League.

AFC Newbury also enjoyed numerous cup runs in the national competitions, especially in the 2004/05 season. Firstly they reached the 3rd Qualifying Round of the FA Cup (equaling the record set by the original club) where, after famously beating Conference South neighbours Basingstoke Town they lost 0–2 away to another Conference South side Bognor Regis Town. Later that same season the club reached the Quarter Finals of the FA Vase (again equalling the record set by the original club) but here they went down 1–2 away to Bedlington Terriers.

After a tough season in 2005/06 which saw relegation narrowly avoided after a goals from Andrew Storton and Guy Whittingham in a 2–1 win on the final day. disaster struck the club when they lost the lease on the Faraday Road ground and as a result were demoted to the Wessex League's bottom division. Now playing at St. Bartholomew's School, the penniless club struggled to attract good quality players and after a slow start they withdrew from the competition in October 2006.

The actual club itself did not fold however, as their numerous youth sides continued to operate in their respective competitions.

== Honours ==
- Hampshire League Division 1
  - Runners-up 1996/97
- Hampshire League Cup
  - Winners 1996/97
- Wessex League
  - Combination Cup Winners 2002/03 (Reserves)
- Basingstoke & District League
  - Senior Cup Winners 1997/98, 1998/99 and 2003/04

== Playing records ==
=== League ===
| Season | Division | Position | Significant events |
|---|---|---|---|
| 1996/97 | Hampshire League Division 1 | 2/21 | Runners-up, promoted |
| 1997/98 | Wessex League | 3/21 | |
| 1998/99 | Wessex League | 3/20 | |
| 1999/00 | Wessex League | 8/21 | |
| 2000/01 | Wessex League | 12/23 | |
| 2001/02 | Wessex League | 7/23 | |
| 2002/03 | Wessex League | 12/22 | |
| 2003/04 | Wessex League | 5/22 | Re-organisation |
| 2004/05 | Wessex League Premier Division | 6/22 | |
| 2005/06 | Wessex League Premier Division | 19/22 | Demoted to Division 2 |
| 2006/07 | Wessex League Division 2 | 18/18 | Withdrew, record expunged |

=== FA Cup ===
| Season | Round | Opponents | Result |
|---|---|---|---|
| 1998/99 | 1st Qualifying Round | H v Tooting & Mitcham United | L 1–2 |
| 1999/00 | Preliminary Round | A v Sandhurst Town | D 0-0 |
| | Replay | H v Sandhurst Town | W 5–2 |
| | 1st Qualifying Round | H v Portsmouth Royal Navy | W 3–1 |
| | 2nd Qualifying Round | A v Hastings Town | L 1–3 |
| 2000/01 | Preliminary Round | A v Whitchurch United | W 2–0 |
| | 1st Qualifying Round | H v Wick | W 2–0 |
| | 2nd Qualifying Round | A v Gravesend & Northfleet | L 0–4 |
| 2001/02 | Extra-Preliminary Round | A v Ramsgate | L 1–2 |
| 2002/03 | Preliminary Round | H v Hailsham Town | W 2–1 |
| | 1st Qualifying Round | A v Eastbourne Borough | L 2–6 |
| 2003/04 | Preliminary Round | A v AFC Totton | L 1–3 |
| 2004/05 | Preliminary Round | H v East Grinstead Town | W 3–0 |
| | 1st Qualifying Round | H v B.A.T. Sports | W 4–0 |
| | 2nd Qualifying Round | A v Basingstoke Town | W 4–2 |
| | 3rd Qualifying Round | A v Bognor Regis Town | L 0–2 |
| 2005/06 | Extra-Preliminary Round | H v Farnham Town | D 2-2 |
| | Replay | A v Farnham Town | W 3–2 |
| | Preliminary Round | A v Epsom & Ewell | L 1–6 |

=== FA Vase ===
| Season | Round | Opponents | Result |
|---|---|---|---|
| 1997/98 | 2nd Qualifying Round | A v Portsmouth Royal Navy | W 4–2 |
| | Round 1 | A v Endsleigh | D 2-2 |
| | Replay | H v Endsleigh | L 0–1 |
| 1998/99 | 1st Qualifying Round | A v Lordswood | W 3–1 |
| | 2nd Qualifying Round | A v Ramsgate | L 0–3 |
| 1999/00 | Round 1 | H v Hungerford Town | W 2–1 |
| | Round 2 | H v Mangotsfield United | W 2–1 |
| | Round 3 | A v Burgess Hill Town | L 0–3 |
| 2000/01 | Round 1 | A v Wimborne Town | L 0–2 |
| 2001/02 | 1st Qualifying Round | H v Hillingdon Borough | L 0–1 |
| 2002/03 | 2nd Qualifying Round | H v Hailsham Town | W 2–1 |
| | 1st Qualifying Round | A v Chipstead | W 3–1 |
| | Round 1 | A v Andover | L 1–3 |
| 2003/04 | 1st Qualifying Round | H v East Grinstead Town | W 2–0 |
| | 2nd Qualifying Round | H v Merstham | W 6–0 |
| | Round 1 | H v Littlehampton Town | L 1–2 |
| 2004/05 | 2nd Qualifying Round | H v Redhill | W 5–2 |
| | Round 1 | A v AFC Wallingford | W 7–0 |
| | Round 2 | H v North Leigh | W 2–1 |
| | Round 3 | H v Sandhurst Town | W 3–0 |
| | Round 4 | H v Thackley | W 1–0 |
| | Round 5 | H v Soham Town Rangers | W 1–0 |
| | Quarter Finals | A v Bedlington Terriers | L 1–2 |
| 2005/06 | Round 2 | A v Winchester City | L 0–5 |

== Famous players ==
AFC Newbury were managed by Guy Whittingham, the former Portsmouth, Sheffield Wednesday and Aston Villa striker from 2004 to 2006.

However, the club's biggest claim to fame was that Theo Walcott started his football career with their youth section before embarking on a successful career with Southampton, Arsenal and Everton along with international fame for England.

== Successor club ==
- See Newbury.
