= Hadley Wood & Wingate F.C. =

Coordinates: 51°36′24.649″N 0°10′17.540″W

Hadley Wood & Wingate
- Full name: Hadley Wood & Wingate Football Club
- Founded: 2003
- Dissolved: 2017
- Ground: Harry Abrahams Stadium, Finchley
- Capacity: 1,500 (500 seated)
- 2016–17: Spartan South Midlands League Division One, 18th of 21
| Home colours | Away colours |

Hadley Wood & Wingate Football Club was a football club based in the Finchley area of London, England. They played at Wingate & Finchley's Harry Abrahams Stadium.

== History ==
The club was established as a youth team in 2003, and was a feeder club for Wingate & Finchley. In 2015 an adult team was formed and joined the Premier Division of the Hertfordshire Senior County League. They finished fourth in their first season, and were promoted to Division One of the Spartan South Midlands League. They left the league and disbanded at the end of the 2016–17 season.

=== Season-by-season record ===
| Season | Division | Level | Position | FA Vase | Notes |
|---|---|---|---|---|---|
| 2015–16 | Hertfordshire Senior County League Premier Division | 11 | 4/17 | Did not enter | Promoted |
| 2016–17 | Spartan South Midlands Football League Division One | 10 | 18/21 | Second qualifying round | Resigned from league |
