= Winchester Castle F.C. =

Association football club in England

- Full name: Winchester Castle Football Club
- Founded: 1952 (reformed 2006)
- Dissolved: 2023
- Ground: HCC Sports Ground, Chilcomb
Home colours	Away colours

Winchester Castle F.C. were a long running English amateur football team based in Winchester. They played in the Hampshire League for over 50 years before their untimely demise.

== History ==
The club were first formed in 1952 as Castle and were the 'sports arm' of Hampshire County Council. They originally played in the Winchester & District League before becoming founder members of the North Hants League in 1968, which they won in 1971.

Upon entry to Division Four of the Hampshire League for the start of the 1971/72 campaign, the club became known as Winchester Castle and won promotion in their first season after finishing third.

They remained Division Three for a number of years, during which time they won the Hampshire Intermediate Cup in 1977 after defeating Southampton University in the final. During the 1983/84 campaign, they were promoted as "champions".

The club then consolidated in Division Two before being placed in a restructured Division One in 1986, after many of the top teams left to join the newly formed Wessex League. However, after two seasons they finished bottom and were relegated. Further relegation followed at the end of the 1991/92 season when the club finished second from bottom of Division Two. The club returned in 1997 after finishing runners-up in Division Three.

In March 2001, it was announced that Winchester Castle would merge with their local rivals Winchester City. The amalgamated club decided that it would use City's Abbots Barton for the first team, and keep Chilcomb for the reserve and ladies team. At the end of the 2000/01 season Castle finished as runners-up behind City. The clubs then formally merged in June of that year.

Winchester Castle was reformed in 2006, when the 'A' and 'B' teams decided to leave their parent club, to keep playing together as the Hampshire League 2004 did not want reserve teams to feature amongst its members any more. The following season the club became one of the founder members of the Hampshire Premier League. They generally remained a steady mid-table side, but in the summer of 2023 a long career of county league football sadly came to an end when they disbanded after a loss of personnel.

== Honours ==
=== 1st Team ===
- Hampshire League
  - Division 1 Runners-up 2000/01
  - Division 3 Champions 1983/84 and Runners-up 1996/97
- North Hants League
  - Champions 1970/71 and 2002/03 (as Winchester City 'A')
- Winchester & District League
  - Northbrook Cup Winners 1966/67
- Hampshire Football Association
  - Intermediate Cup Winners 1976/77 and Finalists 1981/82
- Andover Open Cup
  - Winners 1998/99, 1999/00 and 2000/01

=== 2nd Team ===
- Hampshire Premier League
  - Combination Champions 2009/10
  - Combination Cup Winners 2016/17

=== 3rd Team ===
- Winchester & District League
  - Division 2 Champions 1980/81

== League career 1971–2023 ==
Season	Division	Position	Significant events
1971/72	Hampshire League Division 4	3/16	Promoted
1972/73	Hampshire League Division 3	4/16	
1973/74	Hampshire League Division 3	12/16	
1974/75	Hampshire League Division 3	8/16	
1975/76	Hampshire League Division 3	10/16	
1976/77	Hampshire League Division 3	14/16	Hampshire Intermediate Cup Winners
1977/78	Hampshire League Division 3	8/16	
1978/79	Hampshire League Division 3	14/16	
1979/80	Hampshire League Division 3	9/15	
1980/81	Hampshire League Division 3	3/18	
1981/82	Hampshire League Division 3	4/16	
1982/83	Hampshire League Division 3	3/15	
1983/84	Hampshire League Division 3	1/18	Promoted
1984/85	Hampshire League Division 2	9/18	
1985/86	Hampshire League Division 2	11/18	Re-organisation due to formation of Wessex League
1986/87	Hampshire League Division 1	16/18	
1987/88	Hampshire League Division 1	18/18	Relegated
1988/89	Hampshire League Division 2	14/19	
1989/90	Hampshire League Division 2	13/18	
1990/91	Hampshire League Division 2	8/18	
1991/92	Hampshire League Division 2	14/15	Relegated
1992/93	Hampshire League Division 3	10/16	
1993/94	Hampshire League Division 3	15/16	
1994/95	Hampshire League Division 3	7/18	
1995/96	Hampshire League Division 3	9/18	
1996/97	Hampshire League Division 3	2/20	Promoted
1997/98	Hampshire League Division 2	11/18	
1998/99	Hampshire League Division 2	3/18	Re-organisation
1999/00	Hampshire League Division 1	7/18	
2000/01	Hampshire League Division 1	2/16	Merged with Winchester City
2001-04	North Hants League		Playing as Winchester City 'A'
2004/05	Hampshire League 2004	14/16	
2005/06	Hampshire League 2004	11/17	
2006/07	Hampshire League 2004	4/16	Playing as Winchester Castle. Left competition
2007/08	Hampshire Premier League	13/17	
2008/09	Hampshire Premier League	13/18	
2009/10	Hampshire Premier League	14/18	
2010/11	Hampshire Premier League	5/18	
2011/12	Hampshire Premier League	12/18	
2012/13	Hampshire Premier League	7/18	
2013/14	Hampshire Premier League Senior Division	4/18	Competition absorbed Hampshire League 2004
2014/15	Hampshire Premier League Senior Division	8/18	
2015/16	Hampshire Premier League Senior Division	7/18	
2016/17	Hampshire Premier League Senior Division	10/16	
2017/18	Hampshire Premier League Senior Division	15/16	
2018/19	Hampshire Premier League Senior Division	7/16	
2019/20	Hampshire Premier League Senior Division		Season abandoned due to COVID-19 pandemic
2020/21	Hampshire Premier League Senior Division		Season abandoned due to COVID-19 pandemic
2021/22	Hampshire Premier League Senior Division	11/16	
2022/23	Hampshire Premier League Senior Division	12/17	Left competition

== Ground ==
Winchester Castle played their home games at the Hampshire County Council Sports Ground, A31 Petersfield Road, Chilcomb, Winchester, Hampshire, SO21 1HU. .

The venue is accessed off the A31, by a signposted track. Upon entry, there is a car-park with the pavilion/changing rooms adjacent. There are two well-maintained adult football pitches with the far one being used for 1st Team fixtures. The pitch is surrounded by a fixed barrier and also has home/away dugouts and a small covered enclosure. There is also a large grass bank parallel with the length of the far side and as provides an excellent view of both the pitch and the surrounding countryside.

The ground remains in use today for grassroots football.

== Notable players ==
In the late Seventies, Winchester Castle were managed by the former Southampton and Walsall goalkeeper John Christie.

== Local rivalries ==
Winchester Castle maintained rivalry with a number of clubs in the area, most notably Winchester City and Alresford Town.
