= Alton F.C. =

Association football club in England

Coordinates: 51°09′29″N 0°57′54″W

Alton
- Full name: Alton Football Club
- Nickname: The Brewers
- Founded: 1991
- Ground: Anstey Park, Alton
- Capacity: 2,000 (200 seated)
- Chairman: Carl Saunders
- Manager: Vacant
- League: Combined Counties League Premier Division South
- 2025–26: Combined Counties League Premier Division South, 14th of 20
- Website: http://www.altonfc.com/
Home colours	Away colours

Alton Football Club is a football club based in Alton, Hampshire, England. Formed by a merger of Alton Town and Bass (Alton) in 1991, they are currently members of the Combined Counties League Premier Division South and play at Anstey Park.

== History ==
=== Alton Town ===
Alton Town Football Club was established in 1947. The club joined Division Three East of the Hampshire League and won the division in their first season, earning promotion to Division Two. They were Division Two champions the following season, as well as winning the Hampshire Intermediate Cup and the Russell Cotes Cup, resulting in promotion to Division One. The 1950–51 season saw them finish as runners-up in Division One. Although they were relegated at the end of the 1953–54 season, the club were Division Two champions the following season, earning an immediate promotion back to Division One. They were Division One runners-up in 1956–57 and league champions in 1957–58.

Alton were Division One runners-up again in 1962–63. In 1972–73 the club reached the first round of the FA Cup for the first time, losing 5–1 at Fourth Division Newport County. At the end of the season they left the Hampshire League to join Division Two of the Athenian League. After winning Division Two at the first attempt, there were promoted to Division One. The league was reduced to a single division in 1977, and after finishing bottom of the league in 1980–81, the club switched to the expanded Combined Counties League, where they were placed in the Western Division. They were Western Division runners-up in 1981–82 and the following season the league reverted to a single division.

After finishing second-from-bottom of the Combined Counties League in 1983–84, Alton dropped into Division Three of the Hampshire League. They finished bottom of the division for the next two seasons, but after it was disbanded in 1986 they were moved up to Division Two. They went on to win the Division Two title in 1986–87 and were promoted to Division One; the season also saw them win the Aldershot Senior Cup, beating Liphook 3–0 in the final. In 1989–90 they were Division One runners-up.

==== Season-by-season ====
Season	Division	Position	Significant events
1947–48	Hampshire League Division Three East	1/14	Champions, promoted
1948–49	Hampshire League Division Two	1/14	Champions, promoted
1949–50	Hampshire League Division One	5/14	
1950–51	Hampshire League Division One	2/14	
1951–52	Hampshire League Division One	4/14	
1952–53	Hampshire League Division One	6/14	
1953–54	Hampshire League Division One	13/14	Relegated
1954–55	Hampshire League Division Two	1/14	Champions, promoted
1955–56	Hampshire League Division One	7/14	
1956–57	Hampshire League Division One	2/14	
1957–58	Hampshire League Division One	1/14	Champions
1958–59	Hampshire League Division One	7/14	
1959–60	Hampshire League Division One	10/14	
1960–61	Hampshire League Division One	6/16	
1961–62	Hampshire League Division One	4/16	
1962–63	Hampshire League Division One	2/16	
1963–64	Hampshire League Division One	4/16	
1964–65	Hampshire League Division One	7/16	
1965–66	Hampshire League Division One	12/16	
1966–67	Hampshire League Division One	13/16	
1967–68	Hampshire League Division One	7/16	
1968–69	Hampshire League Division One	4/16	
1969–70	Hampshire League Division One	3/16	
1970–71	Hampshire League Division One	8/16	
1971–72	Hampshire League Division One	4/16	
1972–73	Hampshire League Division One	3/16	
1973–74	Athenian League Division Two	1/16	Champions, promoted
1974–75	Athenian League Division One	6/18	
1975–76	Athenian League Division One	7/16	
1976–77	Athenian League Division One	7/18	League reduced to single division
1977–78	Athenian League	7/18	
1978–79	Athenian League	10/19	
1979–80	Athenian League	19/20	
1980–81	Athenian League	20/20	
1981–82	Combined Counties League Western Division	2/11	
1982–83	Combined Counties League	11/18	
1983–84	Combined Counties League	16/17	
1984–85	Hampshire League Division Three	18/18	
1985–86	Hampshire League Division Three	18/18	
1986–87	Hampshire League Division Two	1/17	Champions, promoted
1987–88	Hampshire League Division One	6/18	
1988–89	Hampshire League Division One	5/17	
1989–90	Hampshire League Division One	2/18	
1990–91	Hampshire League Division One	14/18	

=== Merged club ===
In 1991 Alton Town merged with fellow Hampshire League Division One club Bass (Alton). The new club was initially known as Alton Town Bass, before becoming Bass Alton Town the following season. In 1998 they were renamed Alton Town, and were Division One champions in 1998–99. Division One was renamed the Premier Division at the end of the season and Alton were Premier Division champions in 2001–02, earning promotion to the Wessex League. When the league gained a second division in 2004 they were placed in Division One, which was renamed the Premier Division in 2006. The club won the Aldershot Senior Cup in 2004–05, beating Sandhurst Town 3–1 in the final.

Alton were transferred to the Premier Division of the Combined Counties League in 2013, but finished in the relegation zone in their first season in the division, resulting in relegation to Division One. In 2015 they were transferred back to the Wessex League, rejoining Division One. They were renamed Alton Football Club in 2016, when they absorbed Alton United Youth. In 2021 the club were promoted to the Premier Division based on their results in the abandoned 2019–20 and 2020–21 seasons. At the end of the 2021–22 season, they were transferred to the Premier Division South of the Combined Counties League.

==== Season-by-season ====
Season	Division	Position	Significant events
1991–92	Hampshire League Division One	7/18	
1992–93	Hampshire League Division One	10/17	
1993–94	Hampshire League Division One	5/20	
1994–95	Hampshire League Division One	4/20	
1995–96	Hampshire League Division One	14/20	
1996–97	Hampshire League Division One	18/21	
1997–98	Hampshire League Division One	10/20	
1998–99	Hampshire League Division One	1/19	Champions; Division One renamed
1999–00	Hampshire League Premier Division	20/22	
2000–01	Hampshire League Premier Division	7/21	
2001–02	Hampshire League Premier Division	1/21	Champions, promoted
2002–03	Wessex League	17/22	
2003–04	Wessex League	18/22	
2004–05	Wessex League Division One	19/22	
2005–06	Wessex League Division One	20/22	
2006–07	Wessex League Premier Division	17/20	
2007–08	Wessex League Premier Division	14/23	
2008–09	Wessex League Premier Division	19/22	
2009–10	Wessex League Premier Division	18/22	
2010–11	Wessex League Premier Division	13/22	
2011–12	Wessex League Premier Division	10/22	
2012–13	Wessex League Premier Division	18/21	Transferred to Combined Counties League
2013–14	Combined Counties League Premier Division	21/22	Relegated
2014–15	Combined Counties League Division One	13/16	Transferred to Wessex League
2015–16	Wessex League Division One	7/18	
2016–17	Wessex League Division One	12/21	
2017–18	Wessex League Division One	8/18	
2018–19	Wessex League Division One	13/19	

== Ground ==
The club play at Anstey Park, which was the home ground of the original Alton Town club. The merged club played at the Bass Ground before moving to Anstey Park in 2015 as its owners, Coors Brewers, sought to use the site for redevelopment. Coors funded a refurbishment of the Anstey Road ground, which included a new grandstand (replacing an older one), new floodlights and an artificial pitch. A new covered stand was opened in 2017, replacing one that had been removed during the redevelopment work.

== Honours ==
- Athenian League
  - Division One champions 1973–74
- Hampshire League
  - Champions 1957–58, 1998–99, 2001–02
  - Division Two champions 1948–49, 1954–55, 1986–87
  - Division Three East champions 1947–48
- Hampshire Senior Cup
  - Winners 1957–88, 1968–69, 1971–72, 1977–78
- Hampshire Intermediate Cup
  - Winners 1948–49
- Russell Cotes Cup
  - Winners 1948–49
- Aldershot Senior Cup
  - Winners 1986–87, 2004–05

== Records ==
- Best FA Cup performance: First round, 1972–73
- Best FA Amateur Cup performance: Quarter-finals, 1962–63
- Best FA Trophy performance: Second qualifying round, 1976–77
- Best FA Vase performance: Third round, 1978–79

== See also ==
- Alton F.C. players
- Alton F.C. managers
