= Aldershot & District Football League =

Association football league in England

- Founded: 1894
- Country: England
- Divisions: 1
- Feeder to: Hampshire Premier League
- Website: https://adfl.org.uk/

The Aldershot & District Football League is an English football league comprising teams from north east Hampshire and neighbouring parts of Surrey and Berkshire.

The competition is affiliated to the Hampshire Football Association and has two divisions. Teams may be promoted to the Hampshire Premier League Division One. The current champions are Hart United.

== History ==
The league began as the Aldershot Senior League, founded in 1894 for military teams, and introduced a 'Civilian' division of three teams in 1912–13. After World War I the league featured civilian, military and works teams in the same division. Today it consists solely of civilian teams.

== Member clubs 2025–26 ==
Senior Division

- Headley United Reserves
- Jubilee
- Overton United Reserves
- Rushmoor Community Reserves
- Wey Valley
- Woking United

Division One (U23 Development)

- Albury Eagles
- Bramley United
- Crookham Rovers
- Curley Park Rangers
- Fleet Spurs 'A'
- Fleet Spurs 'B'
- Simply Soccer
- Wey Valley

== Recent champions ==
Season	Senior Division	Division One	Division Two	Division Three
2008–09	BOSC	Bagshot	South Farnborough	Frensham RBL
2009–10	Fleet Spurs Reserves	West Meon & Warnford	Old Farnboronians	Frogmore Rangers
2010–11	Headley United	Alton Athletic	Frogmore Rangers	Wrecclesham 'A'
2011–12	Bagshot	West End Village	Headley United Reserves	Bordon & Oakhanger Sports Club United
2012–13	Bagshot	West Meon & Warnford	Wrecclesham	Headley United Academy
2013–14	Bagshot	Wey Valley	Alton United	Bagshot Reserves
2014–15	Frimley Select	Sandhurst Town Reserves	Ropley	Yateley United 'B'
2015–16	Bagshot	Fleet Spurs 'A'	Bagshot Reserves	Division Three discontinued
2016–17	Rushmoor	Hale Rovers	Normandy	
2017–18	Yateley United 'A'	Traco Athletic	Division Two discontinued	
2018-19	Hartley Wintney 'A'	Ropley		
2019-20	Abandoned - pandemic	Abandoned - pandemic		
2020–21	Fleet Spurs 'A'	Hartland Athletic		
2021–22	Hartley Wintney 'A'	Rushmoor Community		
2022–23	Hartley Wintney 'A'	AFC Wellesley		
2023–24	Rushmoor Community 'A'	Division One discontinued		
2024–25	Hart United	Bramley United		
2025–26	?	?		

== Past and present clubs ==
- See Aldershot League Clubs
