= Winchester City F.C. =

Association football club in England

Coordinates: 51°04′18″N 1°18′36″W

Winchester City
- Full name: Winchester City Football Club
- Nicknames: The Citizens, City
- Founded: 1884 (as Winchester Swallows FC)
- Ground: City Ground, Winchester
- Capacity: 4,500 (180 seated)
- Chairman: Ken Raisbeck
- Manager: Craig Davis
- League: Isthmian League South Central Division
- 2025–26: Southern League Division One South, 4th of 22 (transferred)
Home colours	Away colours

Winchester City Football Club are an English football team based in Winchester, Hampshire and playing in the Isthmian League South Central Division. Craig Davis is the current manager. The club motto is "Many in Men, One in Spirit".

== History ==
Winchester City were formed in 1884 as Winchester Swallows FC. In 1894 they changed their name to Winchester F.C. (another Winchester F.C. had existed between 1884 and 1893). A further name change happened on 21 July 1908 when they became Winchester City F.C. as reported in the Hampshire Chronicle of 25 July.

The club joined the Hampshire League for the 1898–99 season. After many years in the Hampshire League they joined the Southern League in 1971–72, but they were unable to sustain this move, and returned to the Hampshire League after only two seasons. In 1991–92, they won the Hampshire League Division Two, and were promoted to Division One. In 1993–94, Winchester beat Cowes Sports to win the Trophyman League Cup. The club underwent a reorganisation in 1999–2000 after a financially turbulent previous season. But they emerged from the tough period and were Division One champions again in 2000–01, earning promotion to the Premier Division, while also winning the Inter League Shield that season. In 2001–02, the club merged with Winchester Castle, but only managed to finish third in the league. However, they won the Hampshire League title, and promotion the next season, and completed a treble of trophies by also winning the Trophyman Cup and the Southampton Senior Cup.

The 2003–04 season turned out to be extremely successful for the club as they won the league in their first season in it, and capped it with the Wessex League Cup title, as well as beating AFC Sudbury to win the FA Vase. However, promotion to the Southern League was denied, as their ground did not meet the criteria set by the league. The following season saw the club have more cup success by winning the Hampshire Senior Cup. After a further title win in 2005–06 the club were admitted to the Southern League's new Division One South & West. In the 2008–09 season the team finished 20th after a last day win at Windsor & Eton, but after the game were deducted three points for fielding an ineligible player and as a result finished bottom of the table, leaving them facing relegation to the Wessex League. The club appealed against the decision with The Football Association but lost their case and were relegated for the 2009–10 season. Manager Shaun Brooks left the club in September and former player Stu Hussey took over, but along with his assistant manager and coaches he was dismissed after a string of poor results in April 2010, resulting in Winchester appointing Glenn Cockerill as manager. Cockerill however left the club and Guy Butters was put in charge.

On 9 April 2012, Winchester City earned promotion back to the Southern League with four games to spare after a 2–0 win over GE Hamble. Butters left Winchester City to further his coaching career with Football League Championship side Brighton & Hove Albion, and the Citizens announced that James Taylor would be taking over as the new manager in October 2012. However, City were relegated back to the Wessex Football League Premier Division for the 2013–14 season. In 2014, Winchester reached the third qualifying round of the FA Cup for the first time in 59 years, but were defeated 3–2 by Concord Rangers. The following season Winchester finished 2nd in the Wessex League Premier Division and, after Flackwell Heath turned down the opportunity of promotion from Step 5 to Step 4 of the National League System, were offered the vacant space in the Southern League Division One South & West, which the club accepted. The club gained media attention in July 2018 when French football player Ousmane Dembélé played Football Manager for it.

== Ground ==
The club plays its home matches at the City Ground, Hillier Way, Abbotts Barton, Winchester.

The City Ground has a 180-seater stand with floodlights, permanent pitch boards, advertising boards, terraces, car parking and turnstiles for entering the ground. Within the ground there is a clubhouse and a refreshments kiosk selling hot and cold food and drinks. The ground has a total capacity of 4,500. A small terraced area (called the 'Bus Shelter') behind one goal is the home of the 'Bus Shelter Band'. A new stand was built behind the other goal during the close season of 2007–08, but this was dismantled three years later to allow for a training pitch.

A new club shop was opened in 2006-07 next to the main seated stand selling club merchandise and other football related memorabilia. During the summer of 2014, a new stand was built behind the dug-outs and a fence was erected around two sides of the pitch separating the ground from the car park.

== Current squad ==
Note: Flags indicate national team as defined under FIFA eligibility rules; some limited exceptions apply. Players may hold more than one non-FIFA nationality.

No.	Pos.	Nation	Player
—	GK	WAL	Charlie Philpott
—	GK	ESP	Jordi Valero
—	DF	ENG	Callum Baughan
—	DF	ENG	Keith Emmerson
—	DF	ENG	Callum Chugg
—	DF	ENG	Robert Jamison
—	DF	ENG	Danny King
—	DF	ENG	Patrick Nolan
—	DF	ENG	Jack Torniainen
—	DF	ENG	Dan Walster
—	DF	ENG	Archie Wilcox
—	MF	ENG	Jamie Barron
—	MF	ENG	Henry Brooks

No.	Pos.	Nation	Player
—	MF	ENG	Ollie Griggs
—	MF	ENG	Claudio Herbert
—	MF	ENG	Luke King
—	MF	ENG	Dan Neild
—	MF	ENG	Max Smith
—	MF	ENG	Dan Jones
—	FW	ENG	Oli Bailey
—	FW	ENG	Warren Bentley
—	FW	VGB	Luka Chalwell
—	FW	ENG	Simba Mlambo
—	FW	ENG	IK Hill

== Club honours ==
=== League honours ===
- Wessex League :
  - Winners: 2003–04, 2005–06, 2011–12
  - Runners-up: 2004–05, 2014–15
- Hampshire League Premier Division:
  - Winners: 2002–03
- Hampshire League Division One:
  - Winners: 2000–01
- Hampshire League Division Two:
  - Winners: 1973–74, 1991–92

=== Cup honours ===
- FA Vase:
  - Winners: 2003–04
- Hampshire Senior Cup:
  - Winners: 1930–31, 2004–05
  - Runners up: 2015–16
- Wessex League Cup:
  - Winners: 2003–04
  - Runners up: 2010–11
- Hampshire Trophyman League Cup:
  - Winners: 1993–94, 2002–03
- Inter League Shield:
  - Winners: 2000–01
- Southampton Senior Cup:
  - Winners: 2002–03

== Club records ==
- Best league performance: 11th in Southern League Premier Division South, 2023–24
- Best FA Cup performance: 4th qualifying round, 1929–30, 1931–32, 1954–55, 2018–19
- Best FA Trophy performance: 2nd round, 2024–25
- Best FA Vase performance: Winners, 2003–04

== Staff ==
- Chairman Ken Raisbeck
- Manager Craig Davis
- Assistant manager Jamie Barron
- Head of Youth Development Warren Bentley
- Club Secretary John Mclaren
