= Basingstoke and District Football League =

Association football league in England

Basingstoke Football League
- Founded: 1905
- Country: England

The Basingstoke Football League is a football competition based in England. Its Saturday division was disbanded before the start of the 2025–26 season.

== Sunday member clubs 2026–27 ==
Division One

- Dynamo Jubilee
- Hampshire Royals
- March Hare
- Oakridge B FC
- Republic Of Chineham
- Sherborne St John
- Winklebury

Division Two

- AFC Aldermaston
- Basingstoke Boars
- Cranbourne Saints
- Eastrop Eagles
- Eversley & California
- Oakridge Nomads
- Odiham Utd
- The Oak

Division Three

- Beggarwood Palace
- Hackwood Harriers
- Legion Legends
- North Hants Athletic
- Old White Hart
- Overton Utd
- Riverdene Royals
- South FC

== Print ==
Basingstoke Football League Centenary by Norman Gannaway
