= 2017–18 Spartan South Midlands Football League =

The 2017–18 Spartan South Midlands Football League season was the 21st in the history of Spartan South Midlands Football League, a football competition in England.

The constitution for Step 5 and Step 6 divisions for 2017–18 was announced on 26 May 2017. Following a few amendments, the constitution for the Spartan South Midlands League was ratified at the league's AGM on 24 June 2017.

== Premier Division ==
Spartan South Midlands Football League Premier Division
- Season: 2017–18
- Champions: Welwyn Garden City
- Promoted: Welwyn Garden City; Berkhamsted
- Matches: 420
- Goals: 1,472 (3.5 per match)

The Premier Division featured 20 clubs which competed in the division last season, along with two clubs, promoted from Division One:

- Biggleswade
- Harpenden Town

=== League table ===
Pos	Team	Pld	W	D	L	GF	GA	GD	Pts	Promotion or relegation
1	Welwyn Garden City	40	32	4	4	100	33	+67	100	Promoted to the Southern League
2	Berkhamsted	40	26	10	4	113	54	+59	88	Promoted to the Southern League (Note: 12 of the 14 runners-up at Step 5 were to have been promoted to Step 4. However, with resignations and mergers in leagues above, all fourteen runners-up were promoted.)
3	Harpenden Town	40	27	5	8	97	55	+42	86	
4	Leighton Town	40	24	9	7	88	52	+36	81	
5	Biggleswade	40	22	7	11	96	61	+35	73	
6	Hadley	40	19	9	12	76	67	+9	66	
7	Leverstock Green	40	17	8	15	84	83	+1	59	
8	Biggleswade United	40	16	9	15	69	57	+12	57	
9	Wembley	40	15	8	17	76	68	+8	53	
10	Edgware Town	40	14	9	17	63	67	−4	51	
11	Colney Heath	40	14	8	18	54	69	−15	50	
12	Hoddesdon Town	40	14	6	20	64	72	−8	48	Transferred to the Essex Senior League
13	London Colney	40	14	6	20	55	72	−17	48	
14	London Tigers	40	14	4	22	53	75	−22	46	
15	Holmer Green	40	11	13	16	53	75	−22	46	Transferred to the Hellenic League
16	St Margaretsbury	40	12	7	21	54	84	−30	43	Transferred to the Essex Senior League
17	Tring Athletic	40	11	9	20	59	71	−12	42	
18	Crawley Green	40	10	6	24	59	90	−31	36	
19	Oxhey Jets	40	8	11	21	56	89	−33	35	
20	Cockfosters	40	9	8	23	52	85	−33	35	
21	Stotfold	40	9	8	23	51	93	−42	35	
22	Sun Sports	0	0	0	0	0	0	0	0	Resigned from the league (Note: Sun Sports resigned from the league, having played six matches, and as a result their playing record (PL:6, W:1, D:1, L:4, GF:6, GA:15) was expunged.)

Source: FA Full-Time
Rules for classification: 1) Points; 2) Goal difference; 3) Number of goals scored; 4) Number of matches won; 5) Head-to-head results

== Division One ==
Spartan South Midlands Football League Division One
- Season: 2017–18
- Champions: Southall
- Promoted: Southall; Baldock Town
- Matches: 380
- Goals: 1,508 (3.97 per match)

Division One featured 20 clubs in the division for this season, of which there are five new clubs:

- Enfield Borough, promoted from Division Two
- FC Broxbourne Borough, relegated from the Premier Division
- Maccabi London Lions, promoted from the Herts County League
- Rayners Lane, transferred from the Hellenic League
- St Neots Town reserves, promoted from Division Two

=== League table ===
Pos	Team	Pld	W	D	L	GF	GA	GD	Pts	Promotion or relegation
1	Southall	38	30	4	4	116	36	+80	94	Promoted to the Combined Counties League
2	Baldock Town	38	26	10	2	99	27	+72	88	Promoted to the Premier Division
3	Winslow United	38	27	2	9	127	60	+67	83	
4	Broadfields United	38	23	6	9	94	59	+35	75	
5	Wodson Park	38	22	7	9	68	48	+20	73	
6	Maccabi London Lions	38	22	3	13	93	73	+20	69	
7	Buckingham Athletic	38	18	11	9	77	51	+26	65	
8	Risborough Rangers	38	17	10	11	89	49	+40	61	
9	Harefield United	38	18	7	13	77	54	+23	61	
10	Enfield Borough	38	19	3	16	95	84	+11	60	
11	Brimsdown	38	13	9	16	80	84	−4	48	
12	Bedford	38	14	6	18	55	90	−35	48	
13	Rayners Lane	38	13	5	20	54	74	−20	44	
14	Ampthill Town	38	11	8	19	70	77	−7	41	
15	Hatfield Town	38	11	5	22	51	87	−36	38	
16	Hillingdon Borough	38	11	4	23	60	106	−46	37	
17	Langford	38	8	3	27	48	97	−49	27	
18	Codicote	38	7	5	26	50	110	−60	26	
19	FC Broxbourne Borough	38	7	2	29	58	104	−46	23	
20	St Neots Town reserves	38	6	4	28	47	138	−91	22	Resigned from the league

Source: FA Full-Time
Rules for classification: 1) Points; 2) Goal difference; 3) Number of goals scored; 4) Number of matches won; 5) Head-to-head results

== Division Two ==
Spartan South Midlands Football League Division Two
- Season: 2017–18
- Champions: Park View
- Promoted: Amersham Town; Park View
- Matches: 272
- Goals: 1,164 (4.28 per match)

Division Two featured 14 clubs which competed in the division last season, along with three new clubs:

- AFC Southgate
- Berkhamsted Raiders, joined from the Herts County League
- Park View, joined from the Amateur Football Combination

=== League table ===
Pos	Team	Pld	W	D	L	GF	GA	GD	Pts	Promotion
1	Park View	32	27	5	0	111	34	+77	86	Promoted to Division One
2	Aston Clinton	32	22	6	4	83	25	+58	72	
3	AFC Southgate	32	24	0	8	106	59	+47	69 (Note: AFC Southgate were deducted three points.)	Resigned from the league
4	Totternhoe	32	22	2	8	95	48	+47	68	
5	Old Bradwell United	32	18	6	8	77	42	+35	60	
6	Amersham Town	32	18	5	9	84	49	+35	59	Promoted to Division One
7	Mursley United	32	16	6	10	71	56	+15	54	
8	Loughton Manor	32	14	9	9	71	48	+23	51	
9	Unite MK	32	15	1	16	77	69	+8	46	
10	Pitstone & Ivinghoe United	32	13	7	12	87	80	+7	46	
11	MK Gallacticos	31	13	6	12	87	85	+2	45 (Note: One match left unplayed.)	
12	Clean Slate	32	7	5	20	35	101	−66	26	
13	The 61	32	6	5	21	38	93	−55	23	
14	Grendon Rangers	32	5	4	23	39	81	−42	19	
15	Berkhamsted Raiders	32	5	4	23	41	96	−55	19	
16	Tring Town	31	3	5	23	27	86	−59	14	Resigned from the league
17	Tring Corinthians	32	4	2	26	35	112	−77	14	

Source: FA Full-Time
Rules for classification: 1) points; 2) goal difference; 3) number of goals scored.
