= 2018–19 Spartan South Midlands Football League =

The 2018–19 Spartan South Midlands Football League season was the 22nd in the history of Spartan South Midlands Football League, a football competition in England.

The provisional club allocations for steps 5 and 6 were announced by the FA on 25 May. The constitution is subject to ratification by the league at its AGM on 23 June.

== Premier Division ==
Spartan South Midlands Football League Premier Division
- Season: 2018–19
- Champions: Biggleswade
- Promoted: Biggleswade
- Relegated: London Tigers; Stotfold
- Matches: 380
- Goals: 1,251 (3.29 per match)

The Premier Division featured 16 clubs which competed in the division last season, along with four new clubs:

- Arlesey Town, relegated from the Southern League
- Baldock Town, promoted from Division One
- North Greenford United, transferred from the Combined Counties League
- Potton United, promoted from the United Counties League Division One

=== League table ===
Pos	Team	Pld	W	D	L	GF	GA	GD	Pts	Promotion or relegation
1	Biggleswade	38	27	8	3	105	35	+70	89	Promoted to the Southern Football League
2	Tring Athletic	38	26	5	7	94	43	+51	83	
3	Hadley	38	26	5	7	73	35	+38	83	Transferred to the Essex Senior League
4	Biggleswade United	38	24	5	9	88	46	+42	77	
5	Baldock Town	38	20	7	11	76	47	+29	66 (Note: Baldock Town were deducted one point for use of an unregistered player.)	
6	Colney Heath	38	18	11	9	65	38	+27	65	
7	Potton United	38	19	5	14	75	58	+17	62	
8	Arlesey Town	38	16	7	15	64	70	−6	55	
9	Oxhey Jets	38	15	10	13	60	66	−6	55	
10	Crawley Green	38	15	7	16	75	79	−4	52	
11	Leighton Town	38	12	14	12	52	49	+3	50	
12	Wembley	38	12	11	15	61	59	+2	47	
13	Edgware Town	38	11	13	14	44	53	−9	46	
14	Harpenden Town	38	13	5	20	54	73	−19	44	
15	London Colney	38	10	7	21	42	69	−27	37	
16	North Greenford United	38	9	7	22	56	89	−33	34	
17	Leverstock Green	38	8	7	23	40	78	−38	31	
18	Cockfosters	38	7	8	23	46	91	−45	29	Transferred to the Essex Senior League
19	Stotfold	38	7	8	23	40	88	−48	29	Relegated to Division One
20	London Tigers	38	7	6	25	41	85	−44	27	Relegated to Division One

Source: FA Full-Time
Rules for classification: 1) Points; 2) Goal difference; 3) Number of goals scored; 4) Number of matches won; 5) Head-to-head results

== Division One ==
Spartan South Midlands Football League Division One
- Season: 2018–19
- Champions: Harefield United
- Promoted: Broadfields United; Harefield United
- Relegated: Codicote; Hatfield Town
- Matches: 380
- Goals: 1,581 (4.16 per match)

Division One featured 20 clubs in the division for this season, of which there are three new clubs:

- Amersham Town, promoted from Division Two
- Buckingham Town, transferred from the United Counties League; they were renamed Milton Keynes Robins midway through the season.
- Park View, promoted from Division Two

=== League table ===
Pos	Team	Pld	W	D	L	GF	GA	GD	Pts	Promotion or relegation
1	Harefield United	38	36	2	0	125	34	+91	110	Promoted to the Premier Division
2	Broadfields United	38	30	4	4	95	37	+58	94	Promoted to the Premier Division
3	Winslow United	38	22	8	8	113	66	+47	74	
4	Buckingham Athletic	38	21	6	11	96	63	+33	69	
5	Bedford	38	19	4	15	79	85	−6	61	
6	Maccabi London Lions	38	18	6	14	77	63	+14	60	
7	Risborough Rangers	38	18	6	14	78	74	+4	60	Transferred to the Hellenic Football League Division One East
8	F.C. Broxbourne Borough	38	17	9	12	84	83	+1	60	
9	Enfield Borough	38	17	6	15	95	84	+11	57	
10	Ampthill Town	38	17	4	17	82	67	+15	55	
11	Langford	38	16	4	18	70	75	−5	52	
12	Rayners Lane	38	15	6	17	76	91	−15	51	
13	Park View	38	13	7	18	79	90	−11	46	
14	Hillingdon Borough	38	16	2	20	88	101	−13	46 (Note: Hillingdon Borough were deducted four points for fielding unregistered players.)	
15	Milton Keynes Robins	38	12	5	21	74	88	−14	41	
16	Wodson Park	38	10	5	23	49	74	−25	35	
17	Amersham Town	38	10	4	24	56	95	−39	34	
18	Brimsdown	38	10	3	25	61	104	−43	33	
19	Codicote	38	7	6	25	64	104	−40	27	Relegated to Division Two
20	Hatfield Town	38	5	5	28	40	103	−63	20	Relegated to the Herts County League

Source: FA Full-Time
Rules for classification: 1) Points; 2) Goal difference; 3) Number of goals scored; 4) Number of matches won; 5) Head-to-head results

== Division Two ==
Spartan South Midlands Football League Division Two
- Season: 2018–19
- Champions: Bovingdon
- Matches: 182
- Goals: 777 (4.27 per match)

Division Two featured 13 clubs which competed in the division last season, along with two clubs joined from the Herts County League:

- Bovingdon
- Sarratt

Also, Loughton Manor relocated and were renamed New Bradwell St Peter.

=== League table ===
Pos	Team	Pld	W	D	L	GF	GA	GD	Pts	Promotion
1	Bovingdon	26	22	2	2	101	23	+78	68	
2	Old Bradwell United	26	20	4	2	73	19	+54	64	
3	Berkhamsted Raiders	26	17	3	6	65	38	+27	54	
4	Aston Clinton	26	14	5	7	60	37	+23	47	
5	Pitstone & Ivinghoe United	26	14	2	10	63	46	+17	44	
6	Mursley United	26	11	6	9	69	51	+18	39	
7	Grendon Rangers	26	12	2	12	51	54	−3	38	Resigned from the league
8	MK Gallacticos	26	11	5	10	59	47	+12	35 (Note: MK Gallacticos were deducted three points.)	
9	Totternhoe	26	9	4	13	48	57	−9	31	
10	Unite MK	26	9	4	13	51	63	−12	31	
11	New Bradwell St Peter	26	6	6	14	48	75	−27	24	
12	Sarratt	26	7	2	17	35	58	−23	23	
13	The 61	26	5	3	18	36	91	−55	18	
14	Clean Slate	26	1	0	25	18	118	−100	3	Resigned to the North Bucks & District League
15	Tring Corinthians	0	0	0	0	0	0	0	0	Club withdrawed, record expunged

Source: FA Full-Time
Rules for classification: 1) points; 2) goal difference; 3) number of goals scored.
