= 2011–12 Spartan South Midlands Football League =

The 2011–12 Spartan South Midlands Football League season is the 15th in the history of Spartan South Midlands Football League a football competition in England.

== Premier Division ==
Spartan South Midlands Football League Premier Division
- Season: 2011–12
- Champions: Royston Town
- Promoted: Royston Town
- Matches: 462
- Goals: 1,676 (3.63 per match)

The Premier Division featured 20 clubs which competed in the division last season, along with two clubs promoted from Division One:

- AFC Dunstable
- Berkhamsted

Also, Kingsbury London Tigers changed name to London Tigers.

=== League table ===
Pos	Team	Pld	W	D	L	GF	GA	GD	Pts	Promotion
1	Royston Town	42	34	2	6	125	44	+81	104	Promoted to the Southern Football League
2	Dunstable Town	42	31	6	5	132	51	+81	99	
3	AFC Dunstable	42	29	5	8	103	43	+60	92	
4	Aylesbury United	42	25	5	12	96	58	+38	80	
5	Haringey Borough	42	24	7	11	103	68	+35	79	
6	Tring Athletic	42	22	9	11	75	54	+21	75	
7	Berkhamsted	42	20	6	16	87	71	+16	66	
8	Colney Heath	42	20	6	16	79	70	+9	66	
9	Stotfold	42	17	10	15	60	63	−3	61	
10	Hillingdon Borough	42	16	11	15	63	53	+10	59	
11	Leverstock Green	42	18	3	21	59	65	−6	57	
12	St Margaretsbury	42	16	7	19	83	88	−5	55	
13	Broxbourne Borough V&E	42	15	9	18	69	75	−6	54	Club folded
14	London Tigers	42	15	6	21	57	74	−17	51	
15	Hadley	42	13	9	20	63	76	−13	48	
16	Hertford Town	42	14	6	22	70	107	−37	48	
17	Oxhey Jets	42	12	9	21	69	88	−19	45	
18	Harefield United	42	11	7	24	51	92	−41	40	
19	Biggleswade United	42	10	8	24	59	89	−30	38	
20	Holmer Green	42	9	8	25	66	106	−40	35	
21	Hanwell Town	42	8	7	27	57	112	−55	31	
22	Hatfield Town	42	8	4	30	50	129	−79	28	

Source: fchd
Rules for classification: 1) points; 2) goal difference; 3) number of goals scored.

== Division One ==
Spartan South Midlands Football League Division One
- Season: 2011–12
- Champions: London Colney
- Promoted: London Colney; Ampthill Town
- Matches: 462
- Goals: 1,822 (3.94 per match)

Division One featured 18 clubs which competed in the division last season, along with four new clubs:

- Chesham United Reserves, joined from the Suburban League
- Kentish Town, relegated from the Premier Division
- Langford, relegated from the Premier Division
- Tokyngton Manor, joined from Hayes Middlesex Sunday League

=== League table ===
Pos	Team	Pld	W	D	L	GF	GA	GD	Pts	Promotion
1	London Colney	42	33	3	6	94	31	+63	102	Promoted to the Premier Division
2	Ampthill Town	42	26	9	7	95	43	+52	87	Promoted to the Premier Division
3	Hoddesdon Town	42	26	4	12	121	60	+61	82	
4	Kings Langley	42	25	5	12	114	77	+37	80	
5	Harpenden Town	42	21	14	7	89	57	+32	77	
6	Crawley Green	42	22	8	12	96	68	+28	74	
7	London Lions	42	22	8	12	91	77	+14	74	
8	Cranfield United	42	22	3	17	119	74	+45	69	
9	Cockfosters	42	19	11	12	87	67	+20	68	
10	Langford	42	19	9	14	107	88	+19	66	
11	Tokyngton Manor	42	19	6	17	92	80	+12	62 (Note: Tokyngton Manor deducted 1 point)	Resigned from the league
12	Bedford	42	18	8	16	88	87	+1	62	
13	St Albans City Reserves	42	18	7	17	92	68	+24	61	Resigned from the league
14	Chesham United Reserves	42	17	7	18	78	72	+6	58	
15	New Bradwell St Peter	42	14	10	18	64	79	−15	52	
16	Wodson Park	42	15	7	20	62	77	−15	52	
17	Welwyn Garden City	42	13	6	23	62	100	−38	45	
18	Buckingham Athletic	42	9	8	25	55	83	−28	35	
19	Kentish Town	42	9	5	28	44	129	−85	32	
20	Amersham Town	42	7	6	29	65	121	−56	27	
21	Stony Stratford Town	42	8	2	32	52	135	−83	26	
22	Sun Postal Sports	42	5	4	33	55	149	−94	19	

Source: fchd
Rules for classification: 1) points; 2) goal difference; 3) number of goals scored.

== Division Two ==
Spartan South Midlands Football League Division Two
- Season: 2011–12
- Champions: Aston Clinton
- Promoted: Winslow United
- Matches: 182
- Goals: 722 (3.97 per match)

Division Two featured 13 clubs which competed in the division last season, along with one new club:

- Hale Leys United, joined from the North Bucks & District League

=== League table ===
Pos	Team	Pld	W	D	L	GF	GA	GD	Pts	Promotion
1	Aston Clinton	26	20	4	2	87	28	+59	64	
2	Risborough Rangers	26	19	2	5	80	26	+54	59	
3	Totternhoe	26	15	5	6	57	41	+16	50	
4	Mursley United	26	15	3	8	46	34	+12	48	
5	The 61	26	14	4	8	52	40	+12	46	
6	Kent Athletic	26	14	1	11	40	41	−1	43	
7	Winslow United	26	11	8	7	59	43	+16	41	Promoted to the Division One
8	Bletchley Town	26	8	7	11	56	59	−3	31	Resigned from the league
9	Pitstone & Ivinghoe United	26	8	5	13	41	56	−15	29	
10	Old Bradwell United	26	7	7	12	38	55	−17	28	
11	Hale Leys United	26	7	3	16	43	77	−34	24	
12	Caddington	26	6	3	17	52	75	−23	21	
13	Tring Corinthians	26	4	4	18	41	74	−33	16	
14	Milton Keynes Wanderers	26	4	4	18	43	86	−43	16	Resigned from the league

Source: fchd
Rules for classification: 1) points; 2) goal difference; 3) number of goals scored.
