= 2013–14 FA Cup qualifying rounds =

Tournament details
- Country: England; Guernsey; Wales

The 2013–14 FA Cup qualifying rounds opened the 133rd season of competition in England for 'The Football Association Challenge Cup' (FA Cup), the world's oldest association football single knockout competition. A total of 737 clubs were accepted for the competition, down 21 from the previous season's 758.

The large number of clubs entering the tournament from lower down (Levels 5 through 10) in the English football pyramid meant that the competition started with six rounds of preliminary (2) and qualifying (4) knockouts for these non-League teams. The 32 winning clubs from fourth qualifying round progressed to the First round proper, where League teams tiered at Levels 3 and 4 entered the competition.

For the first time ever in the history of the FA Cup, a club from Guernsey entered the competition, Guernsey F.C. This Level 8 club, from the Isthmian League, entered the competition in the preliminary round.

== Calendar and prizes ==
The calendar for the 2013–14 FA Cup qualifying rounds, as announced by The Football Association.

Round	Main date	Leagues entering at this round	New entries this round	Winners from previous round	Number of fixtures	Prize money
Extra preliminary round	17 August 2013	Levels 9-10	370	none	185	£1,500
Preliminary round	31 August 2013	Level 8	135	185	160	£1,925
First qualifying round	14 September 2013	Level 7	72	160	116	£3,000
Second qualifying round	28 September 2013	Conference North; Conference South	44	116	80	£4,500
Third qualifying round	12 October 2013	none	none	80	40	£7,500
Fourth qualifying round	26 October 2013	Conference Premier	24	40	32	£12,500
For the next rounds look 2013–14 FA Cup

== Extra preliminary round ==
Extra preliminary round fixtures were played on the weekend of 17 August 2013, with replays taking place on 20–22 August. 370 teams, from Level 9 and Level 10 of English football, entered at this stage of the competition. The round featured 89 teams from Level 10, being the lowest ranked teams in this round.

Tie	Home team (tier)	Score	Away team (tier)	Att.
1	Darlington Railway Athletic (10)	1–5	Newton Aycliffe (9)	82
2	Thackley (9)	1–3	Guisborough Town (9)	78
3	Glasshoughton Welfare (9)	2–3	Jarrow Roofing BCA (10)	75
4	Colne (9)	1–1	South Shields (10)	62
replay	South Shields (10)	2–1	Colne (9)	72
5	Brighouse Town (9)	3–1	Seaham Red Star (10)	75
6	Ashington (9)	9–0	Pontefract Collieries (10)	186
7	Dunston UTS (9)	4–1	Pickering Town (9)	203
8	Garforth Town (9)	1–4	Shildon (9)	166
9	Silsden (9)	1–2	Bridlington Town (9)	101
10	Crook Town (9)	4–2	Billingham Town (9)	108
11	Northallerton Town (10)	2–4	Whitehaven (10)	75
12	Morpeth Town (9)	6–0	Liversedge (9)	48
13	Billingham Synthonia (9)	4–0	West Allotment Celtic (10)	70
14	Spennymoor Town (9)	2–1	Sunderland RCA (9)	209
15	Team Northumbria (9)	2–1	Whitley Bay (9)	195
16	Bishop Auckland (9)	0–0	Tadcaster Albion (9)	359
replay	Tadcaster Albion (9)	0–3	Bishop Auckland (9)	214
17	Albion Sports (9)	2–0	North Shields (10)	67
18	Hebburn Town (9)	2–2	Barnoldswick Town (9)	207
replay	Barnoldswick Town (9)	0–2	Hebburn Town (9)	111
19	Penrith (9)	3–1	Newcastle Benfield (9)	75
20	Marske United (9)	3–1	Consett (9)	121
21	Tow Law Town (10)	0–5	West Auckland Town (9)	100
22	Durham City (9)	6–1	Hall Road Rangers (10)	98
23	Runcorn Town (9)	7–2	Winterton Rangers (9)	83
24	Stockport Sports (9)	1–2	Winsford United (9)	74
25	Worksop Parramore (9)	2–0	A.F.C. Blackpool (9)	143
26	Maltby Main (9)	1–4	Congleton Town (9)	82
27	Bacup & Rossendale Borough (9)	1–4	Formby (10)	45
28	Bootle (9)	2–1	Squires Gate (9)	123
29	Barton Town Old Boys (9)	2–1	Nostell Miners Welfare (9)	60
30	Maine Road (9)	0–3	Runcorn Linnets (9)	176
31	Parkgate (9)	0–3	Shirebrook Town (10)	96
32	A.F.C. Emley (10)	3–2	Wigan Robin Park (9)	252
33	A.F.C. Liverpool (9)	1–0	Cheadle Town (10)	179
34	Armthorpe Welfare (9)	1–4	Glossop North End (9)	138
35	Alsager Town (9)	1–3	Atherton Collieries (10)	75
36	Staveley Miners Welfare (9)	2–1	Ashton Town (10)	122
37	West Didsbury & Chorlton (9)	2–0	Abbey Hey (9)	122
38	St Helens Town (9)	2–2	Ashton Athletic (9)	71
replay	Ashton Athletic (9)	1–0	St Helens Town (9)	58
39	Boldmere St. Michaels (9)	0–2	Tipton Town (9)	39
40	Bolehall Swifts (10)	2–2	Causeway United (9)	54
replay	Causeway United (9)	0–4	Bolehall Swifts (10)	71
41	Bewdley Town (10)	0–3	Coventry Sphinx (9)	44
42	Rocester (9)	3–3	Atherstone Town (10)	89
replay	Atherstone Town (10)	1–0	Rocester (9)	183
43	Gornal Athletic (9)	1–2	Ellesmere Rangers (10)	60
44	Westfields (9)	2–3	Lye Town (10)	82
45	Studley (10)	5–0	Stafford Town (10)	30
46	Heath Hayes (9)	1–3	Black Country Rangers (10)	53
47	Walsall Wood (9)	4–1	Continental Star (9)	43
48	Norton United (9)	7–1	Southam United (10)	46
49	Tividale (9)	3–0	Alvechurch (9)	88
50	Stourport Swifts (9)	3–1	Coleshill Town (9)	88
51	A.F.C. Wulfrunians (9)	4–1	Earlswood Town (10)	85
52	Wolverhampton Casuals (10)	7–1	Pegasus Juniors (10)	53
53	Nuneaton Griff (10)	2–3	Brocton (10)	56
54	Shawbury United (10)	0–0	Dudley Town (10)	53
replay	Dudley Town (10)	1–2	Shawbury United (10)	'83
55	Thurnby Nirvana (10)	0–0	Kirby Muxloe (9)	43
replay	Kirby Muxloe (9)	4–4 (4–3 p)	Thurnby Nirvana (10)	82
56	Quorn (9)	5–1	Holbrook Sports (10)	109
57	Retford United (9)	3–1	Heanor Town (9)	141
58	Graham Street Prims (10)	1–3	Shepshed Dynamo (9)	97
59	Harborough Town (9)	2–1	Teversal (10)	141
60	Dunkirk (9)	4–0	Barrow Town (10)	41
61	Stewarts & Lloyds Corby (9)	1–1	Arnold Town (10)	24
replay	Arnold Town (10)	2–1	Stewarts & Lloyds Corby (9)	74
62	Lincoln Moorlands Railway (9)	2–4	Long Eaton United (9)	19
63	Basford United (9)	1–0	Holwell Sports (10)	58
64	Borrowash Victoria (10)	2–1	Louth Town (10)	68
65	Desborough Town (9)	3–1	Oadby Town (10)	96
66	Blaby & Whetstone Athletic (10)	2–0	Heather St John's (9)	75
67	Hucknall Town (9)	w/o	Loughborough University (9)	n/a
Walkover for Loughborough University – Hucknall Town removed.
68	Gorleston (9)	2–1	Deeping Rangers (9)	102
69	Boston Town (9)	3–2	Great Yarmouth Town (10)	69
70	Godmanchester Rovers (9)	6–3	Blackstones (10)	83
71	Holbeach United (9)	2–1	Norwich United (9)	117
72	Thetford Town (9)	1–0	Diss Town (9)	168
73	Ely City (9)	0–3	Sleaford Town (9)	97
74	Yaxley (9)	0–3	Peterborough Northern Star (9)	292
75	Huntingdon Town (9)	4–1	Fakenham Town (10)	54
76	Spalding United (9)	4–2	Eynesbury Rovers (10)	76
77	Swaffham Town (10)	2–1	Wisbech Town (9)	215
78	F.C. Clacton (9)	3–1	Sporting Bengal United (9)	160
79	Great Wakering Rovers (9)	5–0	Halstead Town (10)	92
80	Whitton United (10)	4–1	London APSA (9)	64
81	Kirkley & Pakefield (9)	2–2	Brightlingsea Regent (9)	86
replay	Brightlingsea Regent (9)	1–2	Kirkley & Pakefield (9)	95
82	Stansted (9)	0–0	Brantham Athletic (9)	114
replay	Brantham Athletic (9)	6–1	Stansted (9)	
83	Clapton (9)	0–0	Stanway Rovers (9)	127
replay	Stanway Rovers (9)	0–1	Clapton (9)	85
84	Sawbridgeworth Town (9)	1–6	Mildenhall Town (9)	87
85	Haverhill Rovers (9)	3–1	Eton Manor (9)	86
86	Newmarket Town (9)	3–1	Ilford (9)	70
87	Ipswich Wanderers (10)	0–0	Wivenhoe Town (9)	72
replay	Wivenhoe Town (9)	0–1	Ipswich Wanderers (10)	
88	Barking (9)	3–1	Bowers & Pitsea (9)	71
89	Woodbridge Town (9)	0–2	Hullbridge Sports (9)	83
90	Basildon United (9)	2–2	Southend Manor (9)	53
replay	Southend Manor (9)	1–2	Basildon United (9)	65
91	Walsham-le-Willows (9)	0–1	Tower Hamlets (9)	63
92	Takeley (9)	0–2	Hadleigh United (9)	130
93	Felixstowe & Walton United (9)	3–0	Saffron Walden Town (10)	104
94	Berkhamsted (9)	2–1	AFC Dunstable (9)	96
95	Hadley (9)	1–1	Oxhey Jets (9)	87
replay	Oxhey Jets (9)	0–1	Hadley (9)	85
96	A.F.C. Kempston Rovers (9)	0–1	Wembley (9)	100

Tie	Home team (tier)	Score	Away team (tier)	Att.
97	Wellingborough Town (9)	3–3	Greenhouse London (9)	88
replay	Greenhouse London (9)	5–3 (a.e.t.)	Wellingborough Town (9)	22
98	Hoddesdon Town (9)	1–1	St. Margaretsbury (9)	283
replay	St. Margaretsbury (9)	4–1	Hoddesdon Town (9)	106
99	Kings Langley (10)	3–1	Long Buckby (9)	43
100	Newport Pagnell Town (9)	2–0	Hatfield Town (9)	117
101	Hillingdon Borough (9)	4–2	Leverstock Green (9)	41
102	Cogenhoe United (9)	0–0	Tring Athletic (9)	65
replay	Tring Athletic (9)	3–0	Cogenhoe United (9)	98
103	London Lions (9)	1–1	Stotfold (9)	30
replay	Stotfold (9)	1–0	London Lions (9)	65
104	Irchester United (10)	0–2	Biggleswade United (9)	110
105	Harefield United (9)	3–0	Woodford United (9)	50
106	Codicote (10)	1–1	Crawley Green (10)	22
replay	Crawley Green (10)	3–1	Codicote (10)	32
107	Holmer Green (9)	2–3	Ampthill Town (9)	53
108	Hertford Town (9)	2–1	Colney Heath (9)	184
109	Northampton Spencer (10)	2–0	Bugbrooke St Michaels (10)	69
110	Haringey Borough (9)	6–0	Rushden & Higham United (10)	55
111	Enfield 1893 (9)	0–0	London Tigers (9)	90
replay	London Tigers (9)	2–1	Enfield 1893 (9)	45
112	Cockfosters (9)	1–1	Hanwell Town (9)	94
replay	Hanwell Town (9)	0–1	Cockfosters (9)	110
113	London Colney (9)	1–1	AFC Rushden & Diamonds (9)	400
replay	AFC Rushden & Diamonds (9)	6–1	London Colney (9)	546
114	Sandhurst Town (10)	2–2	Farnham Town (9)	26
replay	Farnham Town (9)	4–1	Sandhurst Town (10)	60
115	Tadley Calleva (10)	w/o	Ascot United (9)	110
Walkover for Tadley Calleva – Ascot United removed.
116	Bracknell Town (9)	2–1	Fairford Town (10)	96
117	Holyport (9)	2–7	Hanworth Villa (9)	83
118	Staines Lammas (10)	0–2	Badshot Lea (9)	45
119	Ardley United (9)	4–1	Thame United (9)	51
120	Camberley Town (9)	2–0	Chinnor (10)	
121	Reading Town (9)	0–5	Wantage Town (9)	69
122	Frimley Green (9)	3–2	Ash United (9)	61
123	Flackwell Heath (9)	0–0	Binfield (9)	207
replay	Binfield (9)	3–2	Flackwell Heath (9)	210
124	Bedfont Sports (9)	2–2	Abingdon United (9)	50
replay	Abingdon United (9)	0–1	Bedfont Sports (9)	49'
125	Westfield (Surrey) (9)	2–1	Shrivenham (9)	70
126	Cheltenham Saracens (9)	0–0	Slimbridge (9)	50
replay	Slimbridge (9)	1–1 (1–4 p)	Cheltenham Saracens (9)	70
127	Cove (9)	5–0	Carterton (10)	32
128	Newbury (9)	1–4	Windsor (9)	80
129	Kidlington (9)	1–1	Hartley Wintney (9)	67
replay	Hartley Wintney (9)	5–2	Kidlington (9)	120
130	Abingdon Town (9)	1–5	Highmoor Ibis (9)	15
131	Dorking (10)	1–4	Shoreham (9)	58
132	Alton Town (9)	3–1	Selsey (9)	74
133	Dorking Wanderers (9)	5–0	Canterbury City (9)	
134	East Preston (9)	0–0	Crowborough Athletic (9)	99
replay	Crowborough Athletic (9)	2–3 (a.e.t.)	East Preston (9)	75
135	Ashford United (9)	0–0	Worthing United (9)	186
replay	Worthing United (9)	0–1	Ashford United (9)	122
136	Sevenoaks Town (9)	1–4	Horley Town (9)	52
137	Sidley United (9)	w/o.	Erith Town (9)	n/a
Walkover for Erith Town – Sidley United removed.
138	Whyteleafe (9)	3–3	Epsom & Ewell (9)	118
replay	Epsom & Ewell (9)	1–6	Whyteleafe (9)	93
139	Holmesdale (9)	1–0	East Grinstead Town (9)	49
140	Horsham YMCA (9)	2–3	Hassocks (9)	81
141	Molesey (9)	8–1	Hailsham Town (9)	104
142	Littlehampton Town (10)	3–1	St Francis Rangers (9)	
143	Chichester City (9)	1–8	Chessington & Hook United (9)	90
144	Pagham (9)	2–4	Tunbridge Wells (9)	148
145	Mole Valley SCR (9)	0–1	South Park (9)	26
146	Cray Valley Paper Mills (9)	1–1	Lancing (9)	101
replay	Lancing (9)	0–4	Cray Valley Paper Mills (9)	108
147	Arundel (9)	0–0	Rye United (9)	57
replay	Rye United (9)	2–1	Arundel (9)	90
148	Beckenham Town (9)	1–2	Corinthian (9)	60
149	Epsom Athletic (10)	1–3	Croydon (9)	101
150	Lordswood (9)	1–4	Eastbourne United Association (10)	93
151	Raynes Park Vale (9)	2–1	Lingfield (9)	40
152	Greenwich Borough (9)	2–2	Ringmer (9)	35
replay	Ringmer (9)	1–3	Greenwich Borough (9)	64
153	Fisher (9)	1–2	Deal Town (9)	80
154	Colliers Wood United (9)	6–2	AFC Croydon Athletic (10)	59
155	Newport (IOW) (9)	4–1	Verwood Town (9)	102
156	Bournemouth (9)	3–1	Highworth Town (9)	64
157	Team Solent (10)	1–3	A.F.C. Portchester (9)	115
158	Bradford Town (10)	1–2	Longwell Green Sports (9)	74
159	Horndean (9)	7–2	Calne Town (10)	30
160	Cowes Sports (10)	4–1	Fawley (9)	69
161	Wootton Bassett Town (9)	0–2	Totton & Eling (9)	49
162	Alresford Town (9)	0–3	Winchester City (9)	197
163	Downton (9)	1–3	Sholing (9)	80
164	Melksham Town (9)	3–3	Hamworthy United (9)	65
replay	Hamworthy United (9)	3–1 (a.e.t.)	Melksham Town (9)	108
165	Christchurch (9)	1–2	Sherborne Town (9)	117
166	Bitton (9)	4–1	Pewsey Vale (10)	52
167	Winterbourne United (9)	1–4	Folland Sports (9)	28
168	Moneyfields (9)	2–1	Cadbury Heath (9)	70
169	Hallen (9)	1–1	Whitchurch United (9)	56
replay	Whitchurch United (9)	0–2	Hallen (9)	67
170	Corsham Town (10)	3–1	Gillingham Town (9)	70
171	Petersfield Town (10)	4–3	Blackfield & Langley (9)	64
172	Bemerton Heath Harlequins (9)	1–4	Fareham Town (9)	72
173	Romsey Town (9)	1–4	Brockenhurst (9)	38
174	Bristol Manor Farm (9)	9–3	Oldland Abbotonians (10)	78
175	East Cowes Victoria Athletic (10)	0–3	Lymington Town (9)	31
176	Hengrove Athletic (9)	0–2	Bridport (9)	50
177	Willand Rovers (9)	0–4	Larkhall Athletic (9)	81
178	St Blazey (10)	1–0	Tavistock (10)	61
179	Bishop Sutton (9)	1–1	Odd Down (9)	32
replay	Odd Down (9)	1–2	Bishop Sutton (9)	45
180	Shepton Mallet (10)	0–0	Street (9)	123
replay	Street (9)	2–0	Shepton Mallet (10)	136
181	A.F.C. St Austell (10)	1–4	Ilfracombe Town (9)	142
182	Buckland Athletic (9)	0–3	Wells City (10)	79
183	Barnstaple Town (10)	0–2	Brislington (9)	239
184	Plymouth Parkway (10)	2–1	Saltash United (10)	178
185	Radstock Town (9)	1–4	Bodmin Town (10)	57

== Preliminary round ==
Preliminary round fixtures were played on the weekend of 31 August 2013. A total of 320 teams took part in this stage of the competition, including the 185 winners from the Extra preliminary round and 135 entering at this stage from the six leagues at Level 8 of English football, while Darlington 1883 from Northern Premier League were ineligible to participate as they only spent their second season. The round featured 34 teams from Level 10 still in the competition, being the lowest ranked teams in this round.

Tie	Home team (tier)	Score	Away team (tier)	Att.
1	Kendal Town (8)	2–4	Crook Town (9)	187
2	Billingham Synthonia (9)	1–1	Brighouse Town (9)	110
replay	Brighouse Town (9)	4–0	Billingham Synthonia (9)	220
3	Jarrow Roofing BCA (10)	2–1	Dunston UTS (9)	134
4	Whitehaven (10)	0–2	Team Northumbria (9)	
5	Hebburn Town (9)	1–2	Marske United (9)	101
6	Padiham (8)	3–1	Clitheroe (8)	327
7	Scarborough Athletic (8)	4–1	Ashington (9)	408
8	Newton Aycliffe (9)	3–3	Spennymoor Town (9)	303
replay	Spennymoor Town (9)	3–0	Newton Aycliffe (9)	510
9	Farsley (8)	1–3	Lancaster City (8)	136
10	Albion Sports (9)	3–3	South Shields (10)	86
replay	South Shields (10)	1–2	Albion Sports (9)	67
11	Shildon (9)	0–2	Penrith (9)	144
12	Goole (8)	0–2	Bishop Auckland (9)	180
13	Guisborough Town (9)	1–1	Bridlington Town (9)	153
replay	Bridlington Town (9)	2–4	Guisborough Town (9)	150
14	Durham City (9)	1–1	Morpeth Town (9)	121
replay	Morpeth Town (9)	3–2	Durham City (9)	
15	Harrogate Railway Athletic (8)	2–2	West Auckland Town (9)	157
replay	West Auckland Town (9)	4–2	Harrogate Railway Athletic (8)	241
16	Formby (10)	0–3	Northwich Victoria (8)	81
17	Bootle (9)	4–1	Barton Town Old Boys (9)	109
18	Ossett Town (8)	3–0	A.F.C. Emley (10)	178
19	Mossley (8)	1–1	Worksop Parramore (9)	139
replay	Worksop Parramore (9)	3–2	Mossley (8)	123
20	Atherton Collieries (10)	1–1	Radcliffe Borough (8)	108
replay	Radcliffe Borough (8)	2–1	Atherton Collieries (10)	135
21	Bamber Bridge (8)	1–0	Staveley Miners Welfare (9)	139
22	Cammell Laird (8)	2–0	Salford City (8)	76
23	Prescot Cables (8)	0–0	Congleton Town (9)	190
replay	Congleton Town (9)	0–1	Prescot Cables (8)	173
24	Sheffield (8)	1–1	Shirebrook Town (10)	286
replay	Shirebrook Town (10)	0–4	Sheffield (8)	332
25	Curzon Ashton (8)	4–0	Ashton Athletic (9)	101
26	Warrington Town (8)	5–0	Winsford United (9)	151
27	Ossett Albion (8)	1–3	Runcorn Linnets (9)	164
28	Runcorn Town (9)	0–1	Glossop North End (9)	133
29	Wakefield (8)	0–2	New Mills (8)	74
30	West Didsbury & Chorlton (9)	0–3	Burscough (8)	136
31	Ramsbottom United (8)	5–0	A.F.C. Liverpool (9)	237
32	Newcastle Town (8)	2–1	Shawbury United (10)	60
33	Rugby Town (8)	1–1	Norton United (9)	203
replay	Norton United (9)	1–1 (3–4 p)	Rugby Town (8)	123
34	Tividale (9)	3–0	Wolverhampton Casuals (10)	142
35	Stourport Swifts (9)	1–1	A.F.C. Wulfrunians (9)	113
replay	A.F.C. Wulfrunians (9)	4–1 (a.e.t.)	Stourport Swifts (9)	140
36	Black Country Rangers (10)	1–2	Halesowen Town (8)	165
37	Chasetown (8)	3–1	Romulus (8)	223
38	Sutton Coldfield Town (8)	1–0	Bedworth United (8)	173
39	Coventry Sphinx (9)	2–1	Lye Town (10)	131
40	Leek Town (8)	2–2	Walsall Wood (9)	176
replay	Walsall Wood (9)	2–0	Leek Town (8)	126
41	Atherstone Town (10)	3–1	Studley (10)	188
42	Market Drayton Town (8)	1–3	Kidsgrove Athletic (8)	103
43	Evesham United (8)	2–1	Bolehall Swifts (10)	174
44	Brocton (10)	6–0	Ellesmere Rangers (10)	83
45	Tipton Town (9)	1–0	Stratford Town (8)	93
46	Loughborough Dynamo (8)	0–1	Eastwood Town (8)	139
47	Kettering Town (8)	0–2	Gresley (8)	562
48	Basford United (9)	2–2	Quorn (9)	153
replay	Quorn (9)	1–1 (3–5 p)	Basford United (9)	181
49	Dunkirk (9)	1–1	Rainworth Miners Welfare (8)	68
replay	Rainworth Miners Welfare (8)	0–1 (a.e.t.)	Dunkirk (9)	118
50	Coalville Town (8)	7–1	Lincoln United (8)	152
51	Desborough Town (9)	2–4	Loughborough University (9)	57
52	Blaby & Whetstone Athletic (10)	2–0	Kirby Muxloe (9)	64
53	Carlton Town (8)	2–0	Borrowash Victoria (10)	69
54	Arnold Town (10)	2–2	Brigg Town (8)	90
replay	Brigg Town (8)	4–2	Arnold Town (10)	83
55	Long Eaton United (9)	4–0	Shepshed Dynamo (9)	182
56	Mickleover Sports (8)	8–0	Harborough Town (9)	91
57	Belper Town (8)	5–0	Retford United (9)	218
58	Sleaford Town (9)	1–0	Godmanchester Rovers (9)	
59	Swaffham Town (10)	0–2	Huntingdon Town (9)	202
60	Spalding United (9)	4–0	Holbeach United (9)	341
61	Gorleston (9)	4–1	Thetford Town (9)	143
62	Peterborough Northern Star (9)	2–4	Wroxham (8)	99
63	St Ives Town (8)	3–1	Soham Town Rangers (8)	265
64	Boston Town (9)	1–3	Dereham Town (8)	93
65	Brantham Athletic (9)	1–0	Barkingside (8)	71
66	Clapton (9)	0–2	Mildenhall Town (9)	107
67	A.F.C. Sudbury (8)	4–1	Ipswich Wanderers (10)	164
68	Waltham Abbey (8)	1–1	Whitton United (10)	105
replay	Whitton United (10)	0–3	Waltham Abbey (8)	102
69	Basildon United (9)	0–3	Heybridge Swifts (8)	54
70	Harlow Town (8)	4–1	Tower Hamlets (9)	161
71	Aveley (8)	7–0	Waltham Forest (8)	52
72	Tilbury (8)	2–0	Kirkley & Pakefield (9)	63
73	Witham Town (8)	0–0	Newmarket Town (9)	61
replay	Newmarket Town (9)	0–2	Witham Town (8)	115
74	Thurrock (8)	3–0	Felixstowe & Walton United (9)	66
75	Brentwood Town (8)	3–2	Great Wakering Rovers (9)	92
76	Needham Market (8)	3–2	Haverhill Rovers (9)	202
77	F.C. Clacton (9)	3–0	Hullbridge Sports (9)	162
78	Redbridge (8)	1–3	Burnham Ramblers (8)	70

Tie	Home team (tier)	Score	Away team (tier)	Att.
79	Hadleigh United (9)	0–5	Romford (8)	151
80	Maldon & Tiptree (8)	1–1	Barking (9)	76
replay	Barking (9)	0–1	Maldon & Tiptree (8)	90
81	St. Margaretsbury (9)	1–0	London Tigers (9)	35
82	Kings Langley (10)	2–1	Newport Pagnell Town (9)	50
83	Uxbridge (8)	5–1	Stotfold (9)	102
84	Ware (8)	1–5	Wembley (9)	61
85	Crawley Green (10)	0–3	Dunstable Town (8)	209
86	Barton Rovers (8)	4–0	Ampthill Town (9)	150
87	Haringey Borough (9)	2–1	A.F.C. Hayes (8)	37
88	Potters Bar Town (8)	0–3	Greenhouse London (9)	58
89	North Greenford United (8)	3–0	Tring Athletic (9)	51
90	Royston Town (8)	3–3	Northampton Spencer (10)	165
replay	Northampton Spencer (10)	2–3	Royston Town (8)	113
91	Cockfosters (9)	2–1	Hadley (9)	85
92	Daventry Town (8)	1–0	Hillingdon Borough (9)	77
93	Berkhamsted (9)	4–1	Harefield United (9)	107
94	Northwood (8)	1–2	AFC Rushden & Diamonds (9)	292
95	Hertford Town (9)	4–2	Cheshunt (8)	184
96	Leighton Town (8)	1–3	Biggleswade United (9)	140
97	Bedfont Sports (9)	1–3	North Leigh (8)	78
98	Beaconsfield SYCOB (8)	5–3	Bracknell Town (9)	75
99	Badshot Lea (9)	2–3	Hartley Wintney (9)	116
100	Wantage Town (9)	2–3	Didcot Town (8)	321
101	Marlow (8)	1–2	Chertsey Town (8)	102
102	Slough Town (8)	1–1	Cirencester Town (8)	
replay	Cirencester Town (8)	1–0	Slough Town (8)	122
103	Ashford Town (Middx) (8)	0–0	Bishop's Cleeve (8)	80
replay	Bishop's Cleeve (8)	0–1	Ashford Town (Middx) (8)	83
104	Binfield (9)	0–0	Cheltenham Saracens (9)	162
replay	Cheltenham Saracens (9)	1–7	Binfield (9)	52
105	Shortwood United (8)	2–1	Egham Town (8)	91
106	Ardley United (9)	1–0	Hanworth Villa (9)	71
107	Chalfont St Peter (8)	5–3	Tadley Calleva (10)	91
108	Fleet Town (8)	0–1	Westfield (Surrey) (9)	116
109	Windsor (9)	1–3	Highmoor Ibis (9)	194
110	Aylesbury (8)	2–1	Thatcham Town (8)	118
111	Frimley Green (9)	0–2	Cove (9)	93
112	Cinderford Town (8)	1–3	Aylesbury United (8)	81
113	Farnham Town (9)	0–3	Camberley Town (9)	42
114	Erith & Belvedere (8)	0–5	Chatham Town (8)	96
115	Littlehampton Town (10)	1–0	Greenwich Borough (9)	
116	Raynes Park Vale (9)	4–4	Alton Town (9)	60
replay	Alton Town (9)	1–0	Raynes Park Vale (9)	94
117	Eastbourne United Association (10)	2–2	Herne Bay (8)	142
replay	Herne Bay (8)	1–2	Eastbourne United Association (10)	207
118	Guildford City (8)	0–4	South Park (9)	73
119	Folkestone Invicta (8)	3–3	Molesey (9)	214
replay	Molesey (9)	2–3	Folkestone Invicta (8)	181
120	Colliers Wood United (9)	1–3	East Preston (9)	42
121	Merstham (8)	4–2	Deal Town (9)	75
122	Croydon (9)	0–2	Whyteleafe (9)	110
123	Hastings United (8)	1–0	Ramsgate (8)	387
124	Leatherhead (8)	1–0	Tooting & Mitcham United (8)	205
125	Shoreham (9)	2–1	Walton Casuals (8)	63
126	Crawley Down Gatwick (8)	1–3	Guernsey (8)	271
127	Horley Town (9)	5–3	Holmesdale (9)	46
128	Dorking Wanderers (9)	0–0	Hassocks (9)	42
replay	Hassocks (9)	1–0	Dorking Wanderers (9)	86
129	Walton & Hersham (8)	0–2	Horsham (8)	130
130	Chipstead (8)	3–2	Rye United (9)	57
131	Eastbourne Town (8)	1–0	Corinthian (9)	109
132	Faversham Town (8)	5–1	Worthing (8)	167
133	VCD Athletic (8)	1–3	Burgess Hill Town (8)	74
134	Chessington & Hook United (9)	0–1	Sittingbourne (8)	78
135	Corinthian-Casuals (8)	3–0	Erith Town (9)	60
136	Peacehaven & Telscombe (8)	4–0	Ashford United (9)	140
137	Three Bridges (8)	2–1	Hythe Town (8)	85
138	Tunbridge Wells (9)	0–0	Whitstable Town (8)	414
replay	Whitstable Town (8)	0–2	Tunbridge Wells (9)	
139	Cray Valley Paper Mills (9)	0–2	Redhill (8)	110
140	Corsham Town (10)	2–0	Sherborne Town (9)	72
141	Moneyfields (9)	2–2	Longwell Green Sports (9)	
replay	Longwell Green Sports (9)	1–2	Moneyfields (9)	72
142	Godalming Town (8)	0–1	A.F.C. Portchester (9)	166
143	Bournemouth (9)	2–4	Hallen (9)	55
144	Winchester City (9)	3–0	Swindon Supermarine (8)	186
145	Yate Town (8)	2–1	Cowes Sports (10)	172
146	Bristol Manor Farm (9)	7–1	Lymington Town (9)	77
147	Petersfield Town (10)	1–2	Horndean (9)	121
148	Wimborne Town (8)	1–3	Hamworthy United (9)	176
149	Newport (IOW) (9)	0–2	Fareham Town (9)	168
150	Brockenhurst (9)	2–0	Folland Sports (9)	59
151	Totton & Eling (9)	0–0	Sholing (9)	112
replay	Sholing (9)	2–1	Totton & Eling (9)	
152	Mangotsfield United (8)	3–0	Bitton (9)	142
153	Taunton Town (8)	1–1	Bridgwater Town (8)	467
replay	Bridgwater Town (8)	2–1	Taunton Town (8)	513
154	Bridport (9)	2–3	Merthyr Town (8)	146
155	Clevedon Town (8)	4–1	Bishop Sutton (9)	88
156	Plymouth Parkway (10)	4–1	Ilfracombe Town (9)	177
157	Street (9)	1–0	Paulton Rovers (8)	136
158	Wells City (10)	3–2	Bodmin Town (10)	83
159	Brislington (9)	4–0	St Blazey (10)	82
160	Larkhall Athletic (9)	1–0	Tiverton Town (8)	164

== First qualifying round ==
The first qualifying round fixtures were played on the weekend of 14 September 2013, with replays being played the following mid-week. A total of 232 teams took part in this stage of the competition, including the 160 winners from the Preliminary round and 72 entering at this stage from the top division of the three leagues at Level 7 of English football. The round featured 10 teams from Level 10 still in the competition, being the lowest ranked teams in this round.

Tie	Home team (tier)	Score	Away team (tier)	Att.
1	Marske United (9)	3–0	Albion Sports (9)	222
2	Blyth Spartans (7)	1–3	AFC Fylde (7)	386
3	Whitby Town (7)	1–1	West Auckland Town (9)	284
replay	West Auckland Town (9)	4–1	Whitby Town (7)	287
4	Penrith (9)	3–1	Padiham (8)	140
5	Spennymoor Town (9)	0–1	Lancaster City (8)	449
6	Team Northumbria (9)	0–4	Scarborough Athletic (8)	140
7	Brighouse Town (9)	4–1	Crook Town (9)	161
8	Guisborough Town (9)	2–2	Bishop Auckland (9)	202
replay	Bishop Auckland (9)	0–2	Guisborough Town (9)	198
9	Jarrow Roofing BCA (10)	1–0	Morpeth Town (9)	60
10	Stocksbridge Park Steels (7)	2–2	Ramsbottom United (8)	129
replay	Ramsbottom United (8)	3–0	Stocksbridge Park Steels (7)	127
11	Marine (7)	2–4	Curzon Ashton (8)	233
12	Warrington Town (8)	0–0	New Mills (8)	130
replay	New Mills (8)	0–1	Warrington Town (8)	114
13	Runcorn Linnets (9)	2–1	Glossop North End (9)	356
14	Prescot Cables (8)	0–1	Buxton (7)	220
15	F.C. United of Manchester (7)	0–1	Chorley (7)	1,318
16	Ashton United (7)	2–1	Witton Albion (7)	152
17	Ossett Town (8)	2–2	Bamber Bridge (8)	93
replay	Bamber Bridge (8)	1–2	Ossett Town (8)	109
18	Frickley Athletic (7)	4–1	Sheffield (8)	222
19	Worksop Parramore (9)	1–3	Cammell Laird (8)	140
20	Droylsden (7)	1–5	Trafford (7)	186
21	Worksop Town (7)	1–1	Bootle (9)	179
replay	Bootle (9)	0–4	Worksop Town (7)	193
22	Burscough (8)	2–1	Radcliffe Borough (8)	144
23	Northwich Victoria (8)	0–3	Skelmersdale United (7)	187
24	Tipton Town (9)	2–0	Kidsgrove Athletic (8)	56
25	Atherstone Town (10)	3–3	Redditch United (7)	307
replay	Redditch United (7)	1–2	Atherstone Town (10)	183
26	A.F.C. Wulfrunians (9)	1–1	Walsall Wood (9)	132
replay	Walsall Wood (9)	3–4 (a.e.t.)	A.F.C. Wulfrunians (9)	86
27	Evesham United (8)	0–3	Stourbridge (7)	265
28	Hinckley United (7)	0–3	Rushall Olympic (7)	260
29	Newcastle Town (8)	2–2	Sutton Coldfield Town (8)	81
replay	Sutton Coldfield Town (8)	2–0	Newcastle Town (8)	61
30	Chasetown (8)	0–0	Stafford Rangers (7)	359
replay	Stafford Rangers (7)	2–0	Chasetown (8)	311
31	Halesowen Town (8)	2–1	Brocton (10)	222
32	Coventry Sphinx (9)	2–1	Tividale (9)	180
33	Nantwich Town (7)	1–2	Rugby Town (8)	232
34	Coalville Town (8)	3–2	Long Eaton United (9)	145
35	Stamford (7)	0–0	Grantham Town (7)	318
replay	Grantham Town (7)	2–3	Stamford (7)	212
36	Corby Town (7)	3–0	Barwell (7)	269
37	Mickleover Sports (8)	2–0	Loughborough University (9)	147
38	Carlton Town (8)	1–1	Brigg Town (8)	69
replay	Brigg Town (8)	1–2	Carlton Town (8)	76
39	Dunkirk (9)	0–0	Blaby & Whetstone Athletic (10)	85
replay	Blaby & Whetstone Athletic (10)	2–1	Dunkirk (9)	90
40	Gresley (8)	3–2	Eastwood Town (8)	300
41	Ilkeston (7)	1–2	Belper Town (8)	516
42	Basford United (9)	0–2	Matlock Town (7)	169
43	St Neots Town (7)	3–1	Wroxham (8)	232
44	Sleaford Town (9)	A–A	Huntingdon Town (9)	
Match abandoned. Both sides removed from competition.
45	King's Lynn Town (7)	1–5	Cambridge City (7)	705
46	St Ives Town (8)	4–1	Dereham Town (8)	291
47	Spalding United (9)	1–0	Gorleston (9)	197
48	Billericay Town (7)	2–0	Leiston (7)	210
49	Grays Athletic (7)	2–1	Romford (8)	217
50	Witham Town (8)	1–1	Mildenhall Town (9)	109
replay	Mildenhall Town (9)	1–3	Witham Town (8)	203
51	Harlow Town (8)	2–1	Lowestoft Town (7)	236
52	A.F.C. Hornchurch (7)	1–1	East Thurrock United (7)	273
replay	East Thurrock United (7)	1–2	A.F.C. Hornchurch (7)	156
53	Brentwood Town (8)	3–3	F.C. Clacton (9)	91
replay	F.C. Clacton (9)	2–1	Brentwood Town (8)	226
54	Needham Market (8)	3–2	Brantham Athletic (9)	249
55	Bury Town (7)	0–2	Thurrock (8)	234

Tie	Home team (tier)	Score	Away team (tier)	Att.
56	Aveley (8)	2–5	Canvey Island (7)	131
57	Tilbury (8)	2–1	Waltham Abbey (8)	77
58	Maldon & Tiptree (8)	0–2	Heybridge Swifts (8)	282
59	Burnham Ramblers (8)	1–2	A.F.C. Sudbury (8)	119
60	Hendon (7)	7–1	Biggleswade United (9)	138
61	Chesham United (7)	1–2	Royston Town (8)	255
62	Cockfosters (9)	2–2	AFC Rushden & Diamonds (9)	305
replay	AFC Rushden & Diamonds (9)	8–0	Cockfosters (9)	421
63	Daventry Town (8)	6–1	Berkhamsted (9)	132
64	Greenhouse London (9)	2–6	Bedford Town (7)	62
65	Wingate & Finchley (7)	0–0	Biggleswade Town (7)	108
replay	Biggleswade Town (7)	4–3	Wingate & Finchley (7)	78
66	Hitchin Town (7)	1–1	Arlesey Town (7)	431
replay	Arlesey Town (7)	2–0	Hitchin Town (7)	257
67	Uxbridge (8)	2–3	Barton Rovers (8)	90
68	Harrow Borough (7)	2–2	North Greenford United (8)	135
replay	North Greenford United (8)	2–1	Harrow Borough (7)	135
69	Wembley (9)	0–2	Haringey Borough (9)	60
70	St Albans City (7)	6–1	Enfield Town (7)	423
71	Wealdstone (7)	6–1	Kings Langley (10)	332
72	Hertford Town (9)	0–6	Dunstable Town (8)	144
73	St. Margaretsbury (9)	0–7	Hemel Hempstead Town (7)	97
74	Westfield (Surrey) (9)	1–1	Aylesbury United (8)	201
replay	Aylesbury United (8)	2–0	Westfield (Surrey) (9)	
75	Beaconsfield SYCOB (8)	2–4	Burnham (7)	133
76	Chertsey Town (8)	4–0	Highmoor Ibis (9)	121
77	Didcot Town (8)	2–1	North Leigh (8)	156
78	Hampton & Richmond Borough (7)	4–2	Ashford Town (Middx) (8)	235
79	Aylesbury (8)	1–5	Shortwood United (8)	112
80	Hungerford Town (7)	4–0	Cove (9)	100
81	Chalfont St Peter (8)	0–0	Metropolitan Police (7)	60
replay	Metropolitan Police (7)	0–1	Chalfont St Peter (8)	67
82	Ardley United (9)	2–2	Binfield (9)	66
replay	Binfield (9)	4–1	Ardley United (9)	189
83	Hartley Wintney (9)	0–0	Camberley Town (9)	148
replay	Camberley Town (9)	0–2	Hartley Wintney (9)	98
84	Banbury United (7)	1–2	Cirencester Town (8)	171
85	Leatherhead (8)	2–1	Carshalton Athletic (7)	267
86	Burgess Hill Town (8)	8–1	Alton Town (9)	203
87	South Park (9)	1–1	Horsham (8)	227
replay	Horsham (8)	5–2	South Park (9)	134
88	Merstham (8)	1–0	Corinthian-Casuals (8)	90
89	Peacehaven & Telscombe (8)	2–3	Lewes (7)	612
90	Three Bridges (8)	0–1	Maidstone United (7)	263
91	Thamesmead Town (7)	2–0	Redhill (8)	51
92	Hastings United (8)	2–3	Guernsey (8)	573
93	Margate (7)	2–1	Kingstonian (7)	328
94	Folkestone Invicta (8)	2–0	Eastbourne United Association (10)	253
95	Sittingbourne (8)	3–2	Littlehampton Town (10)	142
96	Dulwich Hamlet (7)	6–0	Shoreham (9)	341
97	Hassocks (9)	1–2	Chipstead (8)	105
98	Eastbourne Town (8)	3–2	Tunbridge Wells (9)	235
99	Whyteleafe (9)	3–0	Horley Town (9)	117
100	Cray Wanderers (7)	0–3	Faversham Town (8)	104
101	Chatham Town (8)	2–1	East Preston (9)	147
102	Poole Town (7)	2–0	Brockenhurst (9)	278
103	Fareham Town (9)	0–1	Weymouth (7)	323
104	Hallen (9)	1–2	Hamworthy United (9)	58
105	Sholing (9)	4–0	A.F.C. Totton (7)	312
106	Frome Town (7)	1–1	Bognor Regis Town (7)	218
replay	Bognor Regis Town (7)	4–0	Frome Town (7)	
107	Corsham Town (10)	4–4	Bristol Manor Farm (9)	70
replay	Bristol Manor Farm (9)	1–0	Corsham Town (10)	104
108	Yate Town (8)	3–2	Chippenham Town (7)	248
109	Winchester City (9)	1–2	Mangotsfield United (8)	164
110	Horndean (9)	0–5	A.F.C. Portchester (9)	195
111	Bashley (7)	2–0	Moneyfields (9)	155
112	Truro City (7)	1–0	Street (9)	365
113	Bridgwater Town (8)	2–1	Merthyr Town (8)	295
114	Bideford (7)	3–0	Larkhall Athletic (9)	221
115	Wells City (10)	1–2	Brislington (9)	109
116	Clevedon Town (8)	1–0	Plymouth Parkway (10)	107

== Second qualifying round ==
The second qualifying round fixtures were played on the weekend of 28 September 2013. A total of 160 teams took part in this stage of the competition, including the 116 winners from the First qualifying round and 44 Level 6 teams, from Conference North and Conference South, entering at this stage. The round featured Atherstone Town, Blaby & Whetstone Athletic and Jarrow Roofing BCA from Level 10 still in the competition, being the lowest ranked teams in this round.

Tie	Home team (tier)	Score	Away team (tier)	Att.
1	Runcorn Linnets (9)	1–0	Cammell Laird (8)	423
2	Guiseley (6)	1–2	Bradford Park Avenue (6)	595
3	Frickley Athletic (7)	1–3	Marske United (9)	302
4	Scarborough Athletic (8)	1–1	Penrith (9)	460
replay	Penrith (9)	2–2 (4–3 p)	Scarborough Athletic (8)	230
5	Jarrow Roofing BCA (10)	3–3	Guisborough Town (9)	87
replay	Guisborough Town (9)	3–1	Jarrow Roofing BCA (10)	277
6	Curzon Ashton (8)	0–0	Lancaster City (8)	302
replay	Lancaster City (8)	1–2	Curzon Ashton (8)	249
7	Workington (6)	2–1	Burscough (8)	381
8	Stockport County (6)	1–0	Brighouse Town (9)	1,704
9	Ossett Town (8)	1–1	Warrington Town (8)	139
replay	Warrington Town (8)	1–3 (a.e.t.)	Ossett Town (8)	133
10	AFC Fylde (7)	0–1	Ashton United (7)	302
11	Colwyn Bay (6)	1–0	Harrogate Town (6)	259
12	Vauxhall Motors (6)	4–0	Chorley (7)	366
13	Trafford (7)	2–1	Altrincham (6)	829
14	Stalybridge Celtic (6)	3–5	Worksop Town (7)	327
15	Buxton (7)	1–4	North Ferriby United (6)	284
16	West Auckland Town (9)	5–0	Skelmersdale United (7)	362
17	Barrow (6)	3–0	Ramsbottom United (8)	677
18	AFC Telford United (6)	1–3	Hednesford Town (6)	1,345
19	Solihull Moors (6)	1–1	Leamington (6)	479
replay	Leamington (6)	1–2	Solihull Moors (6)	368
20	Atherstone Town (10)	1–0	Coalville Town (8)	484
21	Stamford (7)	4–1	A.F.C. Wulfrunians (9)	225
22	Stourbridge (7)	3–2	Sutton Coldfield Town (8)	373
23	Brackley Town (6)	1–1	Gresley (8)	312
replay	Gresley (8)	0–1	Brackley Town (6)	302
24	Gainsborough Trinity (6)	2–0	Rushall Olympic (7)	433
Walkover for Rushall Olympic. Gainsborough Trinity removed from competition for fielding an ineligible player.
25	Mickleover Sports (8)	3–3	Corby Town (7)	270
replay	Corby Town (7)	5–2	Mickleover Sports (8)	228
26	Worcester City (6)	4–0	Coventry Sphinx (9)	514
27	Belper Town (8)	1–3	Daventry Town (8)	255
28	Stafford Rangers (7)	0–4	Boston United (6)	519
29	Blaby & Whetstone Athletic (10)	0–6	Rugby Town (8)	149
30	Halesowen Town (8)	5–0	Tipton Town (9)	421
31	Carlton Town (8)	1–0	Matlock Town (7)	161
32	Grays Athletic (7)	3–0	Tilbury (8)	368
33	Spalding United (9)	1–4	A.F.C. Hornchurch (7)	341
34	Concord Rangers (6)	4–3	St Ives Town (8)	238
35	Royston Town (8)	0–4	Histon (6)	525
36	F.C. Clacton (9)	1–1	North Greenford United (8)	260
replay	North Greenford United (8)	3–1	F.C. Clacton (9)	124
37	Needham Market (8)	3–1	Dunstable Town (8)	251
38	St Albans City (7)	2–0	Billericay Town (7)	372
39	Hampton & Richmond Borough (7)	1–0	Bedford Town (7)	312

Tie	Home team (tier)	Score	Away team (tier)	Att.
40	Arlesey Town (7)	1–0	Thurrock (8)	167
41	AFC Rushden & Diamonds (9)	3–2	Cambridge City (7)	815
42	Hemel Hempstead Town (7)	1–1	Witham Town (8)	425
replay	Witham Town (8)	3–4	Hemel Hempstead Town (7)	156
43	Barton Rovers (8)	0–0	Boreham Wood (6)	172
replay	Boreham Wood (6)	3–0	Barton Rovers (8)	174
44	Biggleswade Town (7)	2–0	Chelmsford City (6)	329
45	Harlow Town (8)	2–3	Heybridge Swifts (8)	263
46	Wealdstone (7)	4–1	Haringey Borough (9)	314
47	Hendon (7)	0–5	Bishop's Stortford (6)	269
48		w/o	A.F.C. Sudbury (8)	n/a
Walkover for AFC Sudbury – Sleaford Town and Huntingdon Town removed.
49	Canvey Island (7)	2–2	St Neots Town (7)	256
replay	St Neots Town (7)	1–2	Canvey Island (7)	289
50	Whitehawk (6)	0–1	Sutton United (6)	267
51	Thamesmead Town (7)	1–2	Sittingbourne (8)	123
52	Didcot Town (8)	2–1	Burnham (7)	103
53	Merstham (8)	1–4	Maidstone United (7)	306
54	Bromley (6)	1–0	Burgess Hill Town (8)	506
55	Horsham (8)	2–0	Faversham Town (8)	361
56	Ebbsfleet United (6)	1–0	Folkestone Invicta (8)	737
57	Guernsey (8)	2–3	Dover Athletic (6)	324
58	Oxford City (6)	1–0	Maidenhead United (6)	249
59	Eastbourne Town (8)	1–5	Hartley Wintney (9)	133
60	Whyteleafe (9)	1–2	Chatham Town (8)	166
61	Chertsey Town (8)	1–2	Chipstead (8)	143
62	Eastbourne Borough (6)	0–0	Farnborough (6)	560
replay	Farnborough (6)	0–2	Eastbourne Borough (6)	332
63	Margate (7)	1–2	Dulwich Hamlet (7)	508
64	Binfield (9)	1–2	Leatherhead (8)	401
65	Aylesbury United (8)	0–3	Staines Town (6)	203
66	Hayes & Yeading United (6)	0–0	Tonbridge Angels (6)	198
replay	Tonbridge Angels (6)	2–1	Hayes & Yeading United (6)	297
67	Chalfont St Peter (8)	0–1	Lewes (7)	153
68	Dorchester Town (6)	0–1	Shortwood United (8)	279
69	Hamworthy United (9)	2–4	Poole Town (7)	350
70	Cirencester Town (8)	2–0	A.F.C. Portchester (9)	170
71	Brislington (9)	3–2	Truro City (7)	172
72	Bristol Manor Farm (9)	4–4	Bridgwater Town (8)	182
replay	Bridgwater Town (8)	2–1	Bristol Manor Farm (9)	321
73	Gloucester City (6)	1–1	Havant and Waterlooville (6)	336
replay	Havant and Waterlooville (6)	2–3	Gloucester City (6)	232
74	Eastleigh (6)	4–0	Mangotsfield United (8)	238
75	Basingstoke Town (6)	1–3	Weston Super Mare (6)	336
76	Yate Town (8)	2–1	Bideford (7)	264
77	Weymouth (7)	2–2	Bognor Regis Town (7)	598
replay	Bognor Regis Town (7)	1–4	Weymouth (7)	414
78	Clevedon Town (8)	2–0	Sholing (9)	86
79	Bath City (6)	2–0	Gosport Borough (6)	441
80	Bashley (7)	0–3	Hungerford Town (7)	177

== Third qualifying round ==
The third qualifying round took place on the weekend of 12 October 2013. A total of 80 teams took part, all having progressed from the second qualifying round. Atherstone Town, from Level 10 of English football, was the lowest-ranked team to qualify for this round of the competition.

Tie	Home team (tier)	Score	Away team (tier)	Att.
1	Worcester City (6)	0–0	Rugby Town (8)	704
replay	Rugby Town (8)	0–2	Worcester City (6)	327
2	Corby Town (7)	4–2	Trafford (7)	531
3	Carlton Town (8)	1–3	Vauxhall Motors (6)	153
4	Marske United (9)	3–2	Halesowen Town (8)	807
5	Stockport County (6)	0–1	Rushall Olympic (7)	2,135
6	Stourbridge (7)	3–0	Curzon Ashton (8)	633
7	Stamford (7)	4–2	Ashton United (7)	427
8	Solihull Moors (6)	4–0	Worksop Town (7)	465
9	Colwyn Bay (6)	2–1	Ossett Town (8)	344
10	Hednesford Town (6)	2–2	West Auckland Town (9)	820
replay	West Auckland Town (9)	2–2 (2–4 p)	Hednesford Town (6)	385
11	Atherstone Town (10)	0–4	Barrow (6)	823
12	Brackley Town (6)	2–0	Boston United (6)	406
13	North Ferriby United (6)	2–0	Runcorn Linnets (9)	520
14	Bradford Park Avenue (6)	2–1	Penrith (9)	427
15	Guisborough Town (9)	1–4	Workington (6)	524
16	Maidstone United (7)	0–2	Boreham Wood (6)	1,781
17	Biggleswade Town (7)	5–1	Leatherhead (8)	366
18	Dover Athletic (6)	3–1	AFC Rushden & Diamonds (9)	735
19	Chipstead (8)	1–6	Bishop's Stortford (6)	204
20	Horsham (8)	0–1	Chatham Town (8)	466

Tie	Home team (tier)	Score	Away team (tier)	Att.
21	Concord Rangers (6)	2–1	Histon (6)	307
22	Hampton & Richmond Borough (7)	5–1	Arlesey Town (7)	406
23	Needham Market (8)	2–1	A.F.C. Sudbury (8)	634
24	Staines Town (6)	4–1	Sittingbourne (8)	357
25	Lewes (7)	0–1	Sutton United (6)	1,173
26	St Albans City (7)	2–1	Tonbridge Angels (6)	605
27	Hemel Hempstead Town (7)	3–1	Dulwich Hamlet (7)	949
28	A.F.C. Hornchurch (7)	6–1	Wealdstone (7)	506
29	Canvey Island (7)	2–1	North Greenford United (8)	332
30	Ebbsfleet United (6)	2–0	Eastbourne Borough (6)	901
31	Bromley (6)	1–2	Heybridge Swifts (8)	797
32	Grays Athletic (7)	0–4	Daventry Town (8)	196
33	Cirencester Town (8)	1–2	Weymouth (7)	366
34	Weston Super Mare (6)	2–3	Brislington (9)	315
35	Eastleigh (6)	2–3	Oxford City (6)	434
36	Hartley Wintney (9)	1–1	Clevedon Town (8)	410
replay	Clevedon Town (8)	3–4	Hartley Wintney (9)	165
37	Bridgwater Town (8)	0–3	Bath City (6)	722
38	Poole Town (7)	2–0	Hungerford Town (7)	551
39	Didcot Town (8)	0–1	Shortwood United (8)	153
40	Yate Town (8)	2–2	Gloucester City (6)	609
replay	Gloucester City (6)	7–0	Yate Town (8)	520

== Fourth qualifying round ==
The fourth qualifying round took place on the weekend of 26 October 2013. A total of 64 teams took part, 40 having progressed from the third qualifying round and 24 teams from Conference Premier, forming Level 5 of English football, entering at this stage. The lowest-ranked sides to qualify for this round were Level 9 teams Brislington, Marske United and Hartley Wintney.

Tie	Home team (tier)	Score	Away team (tier)	Att.
1	Macclesfield Town (5)	7–0	Vauxhall Motors (6)	956
2	Stamford (7)	0–2	Hednesford Town (6)	668
3	Grimsby Town (5)	3–0	Rushall Olympic (7)	1,456
4	Worcester City (6)	1–1	Lincoln City (5)	1,019
replay	Lincoln City (5)	3–0	Worcester City (6)	1,334
5	Bradford Park Avenue (6)	1–1	Kidderminster Harriers (5)	464
replay	Kidderminster Harriers (5)	2–1 (a.e.t.)	Bradford Park Avenue (6)	1,212
6	Wrexham (5)	2–0	Hyde (5)	1,848
7	Workington (6)	1–3	Stourbridge (7)	519
8	Southport (5)	6–2	Marske United (9)	943
9	Colwyn Bay (6)	1–3	Corby Town (7)	552
10	Tamworth (5)	4–1	Solihull Moors (6)	1,035
11	Nuneaton Town (5)	0–2	FC Halifax Town (5)	1,043
12	North Ferriby United (6)	1–3	Alfreton Town (5)	735
13	Brackley Town (6)	0–0	Barrow (6)	409
replay	Barrow (6)	0–1 (a.e.t.)	Brackley Town (6)	830
14	Chester (5)	0–1	Gateshead (5)	1,659
15	Hemel Hempstead Town (7)	3–3	Sutton United (6)	1,455
replay	Sutton United (6)	2–0	Hemel Hempstead Town (7)	662
16	A.F.C. Hornchurch (7)	0–1	Hereford United (5)	739

Tie	Home team (tier)	Score	Away team (tier)	Att.
17	Ebbsfleet United (6)	1–1	Dartford (5)	2,895
replay	Dartford (5)	1–0	Ebbsfleet United (6)	1,901
18	Barnet (5)	3–0	Concord Rangers (6)	1,373
19	Chatham Town (8)	0–2	St Albans City (7)	849
20	Dover Athletic (6)	3–0	Oxford City (6)	869
21	Boreham Wood (6)	1–0	Heybridge Swifts (8)	237
22	Bath City (6)	0–1	Salisbury City (5)	1,068
23	Gloucester City (6)	3–1	Hampton & Richmond Borough (7)	683
24	Weymouth (7)	1–2	Braintree Town (5)	775
25	Forest Green Rovers (5)	0–1	Bishop's Stortford (6)	789
26	Needham Market (8)	0–1	Cambridge United (5)	1,784
27	Biggleswade Town (7)	1–0	Canvey Island (7)	678
28	Shortwood United (8)	1–1	Aldershot Town (5)	631
replay	Aldershot Town (5)	1–2	Shortwood United (8)	1,240
29	Woking (5)	0–1	Luton Town (5)	1,452
30	Brislington (9)	0–1	Welling United (5)	600
31	Hartley Wintney (9)	1–6	Daventry Town (8)	1,040
32	Staines Town (6)	0–0	Poole Town (7)	376
replay	Poole Town (7)	0–1	Staines Town (6)	935

== Competition proper ==
Winners from fourth qualifying round advance to first round proper, where teams from Level 3 and Level 4 of English football, operating in The Football League, first enter the competition. See 2013-14 FA Cup for a report of first round proper onwards.
