= 2012–13 Spartan South Midlands Football League =

The 2012–13 Spartan South Midlands Football League season (known as the 2012–13 Molten Spartan South Midlands Football League for sponsorship reasons) was the 16th in the history of Spartan South Midlands Football League a football competition in England.

== Premier Division ==
Spartan South Midlands Football League Premier Division
- Season: 2012–13
- Champions: Dunstable Town
- Promoted: Dunstable Town; Aylesbury United
- Matches: 462
- Goals: 1,755 (3.8 per match)

The Premier Division featured 20 clubs which competed in the division last season, along with two clubs promoted from Division One:

- Ampthill Town
- London Colney

For this season only, the FA were to promote a second club from two of the following six Step 5 leagues: Combined Counties League, Eastern Counties League, Essex Senior League, Kent League, Spartan South Midlands League and the Sussex County League. This was to fulfil the expansion of the Isthmian League Divisions One North and South from 22 to 24 clubs each. The two clubs were to be promoted on a points per game basis, and the two runners-up with the best PPG were VCD Athletic (Kent Football League) and Guernsey (Combined Counties League). Three others – Aylesbury United (Spartan South Midlands League), Redhill (Sussex County League) and Barkingside (Essex Senior League) – were also confirmed as promoted by the FA on 17 May, due to resignations and non-promotions elsewhere.

From this league, only AFC Dunstable, Aylesbury United, Dunstable Town, Haringey Borough, Oxhey Jets and Tring Athletic applied for promotion.

=== League table ===
Pos	Team	Pld	W	D	L	GF	GA	GD	Pts	Promotion
1	Dunstable Town	42	36	6	0	143	33	+110	114	Promoted to the Southern Football League
2	Aylesbury United	42	28	10	4	105	42	+63	94	Promoted to the Southern Football League
3	Oxhey Jets	42	28	7	7	125	50	+75	91	
4	St Margaretsbury	42	26	5	11	102	72	+30	83	
5	Ampthill Town	42	22	11	9	103	65	+38	77	
6	Hanwell Town	42	22	7	13	89	50	+39	73	
7	London Colney	42	20	9	13	76	73	+3	69	
8	AFC Dunstable	42	20	5	17	92	70	+22	65	
9	Haringey Borough	42	18	9	15	75	55	+20	63	Transferred to the Essex Senior League
10	Harefield United	42	17	12	13	77	67	+10	63	
11	Berkhamsted	42	16	12	14	76	77	−1	60	
12	Hadley	42	18	5	19	86	84	+2	59	
13	Colney Heath	42	16	9	17	75	83	−8	57	
14	Stotfold	42	14	10	18	80	90	−10	52	
15	Leverstock Green	42	13	5	24	54	95	−41	44	
16	Tring Athletic	42	12	7	23	57	82	−25	43	
17	Hertford Town	42	10	10	22	63	93	−30	40	
18	Biggleswade United	42	10	9	23	49	73	−24	39	
19	Hillingdon Borough	42	9	11	22	63	102	−39	38	
20	London Tigers	42	10	5	27	56	111	−55	35	
21	Hatfield Town	42	6	3	33	54	133	−79	21	
22	Holmer Green	42	5	5	32	55	155	−100	20	

Source: fchd
Rules for classification: 1) points; 2) goal difference; 3) number of goals scored.

=== Results ===
Home \ Away	AFD	AMP	AYL	BER	BIG	COH	DUN	HAD	HAN	HAR	HAY	HAT	HER	HIL	HOL	LEV	LOC	LOT	OXJ	STM	STO	TRA
AFC Dunstable		0–2	2–2	1–3	0–2	1–1	1–3	3–4	3–2	0–1	1–0	5–1	2–2	6–3	4–0	6–2	1–2	1–0	2–4	0–2	1–4	2–1
Ampthill Town	4–6		1–1	1–2	0–1	2–2	2–3	2–2	2–1	2–2	0–4	5–1	3–1	6–1	6–1	3–0	1–1	4–0	3–2	3–5	4–3	3–0
Aylesbury United	2–0	4–1		1–1	3–1	0–1	1–3	4–3	2–0	3–2	3–0	4–1	3–0	3–0	7–0	0–0	3–1	2–0	3–0	1–2	2–0	5–0
Berkhamsted	3–2	0–1	0–3		1–0	3–2	1–4	4–1	1–2	2–2	1–4	1–4	2–2	1–1	2–1	2–2	1–0	5–1	0–4	2–4	2–2	1–1
Biggleswade United	0–2	0–3	0–2	0–1		0–1	1–2	1–2	1–2	1–1	1–1	2–1	1–1	3–5	5–2	3–1	1–3	1–0	2–2	1–1	0–3	0–2
Colney Heath	0–3	0–3	0–2	4–3	2–1		0–3	3–0	1–1	4–2	3–0	4–1	3–2	0–0	7–3	1–3	6–2	2–3	0–0	6–2	1–3	2–3
Dunstable Town	1–0	1–1	2–2	1–0	4–0	4–0		4–1	3–2	3–0	2–1	2–0	1–0	5–0	11–0	6–0	4–0	3–1	1–1	5–3	6–0	2–0
Hadley	0–2	1–2	4–6	1–1	3–0	1–1	0–2		1–1	3–2	0–2	0–1	4–0	4–1	6–4	3–0	0–0	2–0	0–2	1–2	4–2	3–2
Hanwell Town	1–0	1–1	1–1	7–1	4–0	5–0	1–2	6–0		0–1	1–0	3–1	3–2	2–2	3–1	0–1	0–1	4–0	0–2	0–1	2–1	4–0
Harefield United	3–3	1–1	1–1	1–0	1–1	4–1	1–5	2–4	0–2		2–1	4–0	3–2	3–2	3–1	1–3	0–2	6–1	0–2	0–3	2–1	1–1
Haringey Borough	0–0	1–1	1–2	0–0	1–2	0–0	3–3	2–1	1–1	0–1		2–1	3–1	2–1	2–0	0–1	2–3	2–1	1–0	3–2	5–0	2–2
Hatfield Town	1–6	3–1	0–2	1–4	1–4	3–0	1–6	2–4	2–5	0–7	2–3		2–3	2–2	2–3	3–4	2–2	1–3	1–6	2–3	2–3	0–1
Hertford Town	0–1	3–3	3–1	3–3	2–1	1–1	2–5	2–1	1–2	2–3	1–2	3–0		3–0	0–2	3–1	2–3	1–0	0–7	1–3	2–2	2–0
Hillingdon Borough	2–0	1–2	1–1	2–4	2–2	1–5	1–3	0–2	1–4	1–1	1–3	2–0	1–0		0–1	2–2	2–3	3–3	1–1	2–0	5–3	4–0
Holmer Green	0–3	2–8	3–4	0–3	0–4	1–4	3–5	1–5	2–5	2–2	2–7	1–1	0–5	0–2		0–4	1–5	2–3	2–4	3–0	1–1	2–1
Leverstock Green	1–4	1–2	0–1	0–4	1–0	1–1	0–4	4–2	0–4	0–2	1–0	1–2	2–0	3–1	4–0		1–3	0–2	1–7	1–5	1–3	2–1
London Colney	3–2	0–3	1–2	2–2	1–0	1–2	0–3	4–2	0–0	2–2	2–1	1–0	3–1	2–2	2–0	2–1		4–1	1–2	3–2	2–4	2–2
London Tigers	2–4	1–3	2–6	1–4	1–1	0–1	0–3	1–6	0–1	2–0	2–0	0–4	0–0	5–0	3–3	2–0	2–3		0–5	1–6	3–1	2–2
Oxhey Jets	4–2	2–2	3–3	3–0	2–0	3–0	0–4	0–1	3–1	2–1	0–8	10–1	7–1	6–2	4–1	2–1	3–0	5–1		0–1	3–0	3–0
St Margaretsbury	0–2	1–4	0–2	2–0	3–1	7–2	0–6	3–0	2–0	1–1	5–2	4–1	2–2	3–0	2–1	4–2	3–3	1–2	1–1		4–2	2–0
Stotfold	0–2	3–0	1–1	2–2	3–3	3–1	2–2	2–1	5–1	0–3	1–1	4–0	1–1	1–3	2–2	3–0	2–1	4–3	0–4	2–3		1–2
Tring Athletic	2–6	0–2	0–4	1–3	0–1	2–0	1–1	1–3	1–4	0–2	1–2	3–0	6–0	2–0	4–1	1–1	2–0	5–1	1–4	1–2	2–0	

Updated to match(es) played on 27 April 2013. Source: goalrun.com
Legend: Blue = home team win; Yellow = draw; Red = away team win.

== Division One ==
Spartan South Midlands Football League Division One
- Season: 2012–13
- Champions: London Lions
- Promoted: London Lions; Cockfosters; Hoddesdon Town
- Relegated: New Bradwell St Peter
- Matches: 420
- Goals: 1,682 (4 per match)

Division One featured 18 clubs which competed in the division last season, along with three new clubs:

- Codicote, joined from the Herts County League
- Southall, joined from the Middlesex County League
- Winslow United, promoted from Division Two

=== League table ===
Pos	Team	Pld	W	D	L	GF	GA	GD	Pts	Promotion or relegation
1	London Lions	40	31	5	4	120	31	+89	98	Promoted to the Premier Division
2	Cockfosters	40	28	7	5	124	37	+87	91	Promoted to the Premier Division
3	Hoddesdon Town	40	29	4	7	112	51	+61	91	Promoted to the Premier Division
4	Crawley Green	40	25	6	9	98	58	+40	81	
5	Bedford	40	25	3	12	113	61	+52	78	
6	Kings Langley	40	22	8	10	109	56	+53	74	
7	Harpenden Town	40	21	9	10	83	47	+36	72	
8	Codicote	40	20	7	13	100	58	+42	67	
9	Southall	40	19	7	14	101	55	+46	64	
10	Chesham United Reserves	40	15	9	16	69	80	−11	54	
11	Buckingham Athletic	40	15	6	19	71	71	0	51	
12	Stony Stratford Town	40	14	7	19	62	93	−31	49	
13	Welwyn Garden City	40	11	10	19	66	85	−19	43	
14	Winslow United	40	12	7	21	65	113	−48	43	
15	Cranfield United	40	11	7	22	53	104	−51	40	Resigned from the league
16	Langford	40	9	12	19	68	103	−35	39	
17	Sun Postal Sports	40	10	8	22	55	110	−55	38	
18	Wodson Park	40	7	12	21	46	94	−48	33	
19	Kentish Town	40	9	6	25	46	109	−63	33	
20	Amersham Town	40	10	8	22	68	99	−31	31 (Note: Amersham Town deducted 7 points.)	
21	New Bradwell St Peter	40	0	6	34	53	167	−114	6	Relegated to Division Two

Source: fchd
Rules for classification: 1) points; 2) goal difference; 3) number of goals scored.

=== Results ===
Home \ Away	AME	BED	BUA	CHE	COC	COD	CRA	CRG	HAR	HOD	KEN	KIL	LAN	LOL	NBP	SOU	STS	SPS	WGC	WIN	WOP
Amersham Town		1–2	4–3	4–1	0–3	0–3	4–0	0–2	0–1	3–3	2–3	1–6	0–0	0–1	3–3	1–0	0–0	1–1	5–3	3–0	3–3
Bedford	3–1		3–2	3–1	0–3	2–0	3–1	0–1	0–2	3–1	6–0	3–2	0–0	4–0	5–2	2–1	11–0	4–1	0–2	10–2	3–2
Buckingham Athletic	2–3	0–3		3–0	1–6	1–0	8–2	0–3	2–2	1–2	2–0	0–0	2–0	0–1	4–1	3–3	5–1	0–2	2–2	3–4	2–0
Chesham United Reserves	3–0	4–1	3–1		0–4	3–4	1–0	2–3	3–1	1–2	5–0	0–4	1–1	1–3	3–2	2–1	3–2	6–3	2–2	0–0	4–1
Cockfosters	6–3	1–1	4–1	4–0		6–0	2–0	4–0	1–0	0–2	0–2	0–0	1–0	1–3	4–0	0–0	6–0	4–1	0–3	9–1	5–0
Codicote	6–1	6–1	3–1	3–0	0–0		4–1	1–3	0–0	2–3	5–1	1–1	1–1	0–1	8–1	1–0	6–0	0–0	1–2	1–2	3–0
Cranfield United	2–1	2–1	1–1	2–2	1–8	1–2		0–3	2–2	1–0	0–1	0–9	0–5	0–6	4–2	1–3	1–0	0–2	2–1	2–2	1–2
Crawley Green	3–0	1–1	1–1	1–2	0–3	2–2	1–4		0–2	3–3	6–0	4–2	5–2	3–3	5–2	2–0	2–0	2–1	4–2	2–0	5–0
Harpenden Town	2–1	1–2	2–0	1–3	2–3	5–1	4–1	4–1		0–2	4–1	2–1	0–0	0–1	4–1	1–0	2–1	3–3	0–0	3–4	2–0
Hoddesdon Town	2–0	2–1	1–0	2–1	2–3	0–5	2–0	2–3	2–1		4–2	5–3	4–0	1–0	7–0	2–1	2–1	7–1	8–1	7–2	1–0
Kentish Town	0–1	1–6	0–3	5–1	1–4	1–5	1–2	0–2	1–3	1–5		2–1	3–3	1–4	1–0	1–1	3–3	0–2	1–2	3–2	0–1
Kings Langley	1–0	4–1	7–1	1–1	3–1	3–0	3–3	1–3	2–0	3–1	2–2		6–0	2–4	4–1	0–2	3–0	3–3	2–1	1–2	4–1
Langford	4–4	1–3	0–2	4–0	1–2	1–3	3–3	1–4	1–6	0–9	8–1	2–1		0–4	5–3	2–3	2–1	4–2	0–2	2–1	1–1
London Lions	2–1	2–0	2–0	5–0	2–2	2–0	2–1	4–0	0–1	3–1	4–0	0–1	7–0		12–1	2–2	3–0	3–1	3–1	5–1	2–0
New Bradwell St Peter	1–2	1–6	1–5	1–1	0–7	2–6	1–4	0–4	1–9	1–2	2–3	1–3	4–4	1–4		1–5	0–4	1–2	0–6	2–2	2–3
Southall	7–1	3–6	1–0	0–3	2–2	3–2	4–0	6–1	0–2	0–1	3–1	2–3	5–2	2–3	1–1		3–0	4–0	3–1	9–0	2–2
Stony Stratford Town	5–4	2–0	2–1	3–2	1–2	3–3	0–0	2–1	1–2	2–5	1–2	2–2	1–0	0–0	2–1	0–5		2–1	2–2	3–1	2–1
Sun Postal Sports	1–1	0–4	0–2	0–0	1–4	2–5	4–2	1–5	1–3	0–4	2–1	1–3	4–4	1–1	3–2	0–4	0–6		1–0	1–2	2–1
Welwyn Garden City	1–4	0–4	1–3	2–2	1–3	2–0	1–3	0–3	2–2	1–1	0–0	0–3	1–3	0–3	4–2	2–5	3–0	6–0		3–2	1–1
Winslow United	5–4	4–1	0–1	0–1	0–0	0–1	2–0	0–4	0–0	1–2	2–0	1–2	2–0	0–5	4–4	0–5	2–5	5–1	5–2		0–4
Wodson Park	5–1	1–4	0–2	1–1	2–6	0–6	1–3	0–0	2–2	0–0	0–0	2–7	1–1	1–8	2–1	1–0	1–2	1–3	0–0	2–2	

Updated to match(es) played on 27 April 2013. Source: goalrun.com
Legend: Blue = home team win; Yellow = draw; Red = away team win.

== Division Two ==
Spartan South Midlands Football League Division Two
- Season: 2012–13
- Champions: Kent Athletic
- Promoted: Broxbourne Borough; Risborough Rangers
- Matches: 182
- Goals: 722 (3.97 per match)

Division Two featured eleven clubs which competed in the division last season, along with three new clubs:

- Aylesbury Reserves, joined from the Capital League
- Broxbourne Borough, new club formed after Broxbourne Borough V&E folded
- Wolverton Town, joined from the North Bucks League

=== League table ===
Pos	Team	Pld	W	D	L	GF	GA	GD	Pts	Promotion
1	Kent Athletic	26	17	4	5	51	24	+27	55	
2	Aston Clinton	26	17	4	5	75	38	+37	54 (Note: Aston Clinton deducted 1 point.)	
3	Broxbourne Borough	26	15	4	7	42	26	+16	49	Promoted to Division One
4	Risborough Rangers	26	12	8	6	63	36	+27	44	Promoted to Division One
5	The 61	26	12	7	7	62	37	+25	43	
6	Tring Corinthians	26	11	5	10	57	45	+12	38	
7	Totternhoe	26	11	5	10	55	62	−7	38	
8	Hale Leys United	26	12	1	13	67	76	−9	37	
9	Mursley United	26	9	7	10	46	47	−1	34	
10	Old Bradwell United	26	10	4	12	44	50	−6	34	
11	Pitstone & Ivinghoe United	26	9	5	12	47	56	−9	32	
12	Wolverton Town	26	8	3	15	38	54	−16	27	
13	Aylesbury Reserves	26	7	1	18	45	76	−31	22	Resigned from the league
14	Caddington	26	3	0	23	30	95	−65	9	Resigned from the league

Source: fchd
Rules for classification: 1) points; 2) goal difference; 3) number of goals scored.
