= List of Arlesey Town F.C. seasons =

Arlesey Town is an English association football club from Arlesey, Bedfordshire, England. They currently play in the Southern Football League Premier Division. The club is affiliated to the Bedfordshire County Football Association.

== Key ==
Top scorer and number of goals scored shown in bold when he was also top scorer for the division.

Key to league record

- Lvl = Level of the league in the current league system
- S = Numbers of seasons
- Pld = Games played
- W = Games won
- D = Games drawn
- L = Games lost
- GF = Goals for
- GA = Goals against
- GD = Goals difference
- Pts = Points
- Position = Position in the final league table
- Overall position = Overall club position in the English league system

Key to cup records

- Res = Final reached round
- Rec = Final club record in the form of wins-draws-losses
- EPR = Extra premilinary round
- PR = Premilinary round
- QR1 = Qualifying round 1
- QR2 = Qualifying round 2
- QR3 = Qualifying round 3
- QR4 = Qualifying round 4
- R1 = Round 1
- R2 = Round 2
- R3 = Round 3
- R4 = Round 4
- R5 = Round 5
- R6 = Round 6
- QF = Quarter-finals
- SF = Semi-finals
- RU = Runners-up
- W = Winners
- Average home attendance = for league games only

== Seasons ==
Year	League	Lvl	Pld	W	D	L	GF	GA	GD	Pts	Position	Leading league scorer		FA Cup		FA Trophy		FA Vase		Average home attendance
Year	League	Lvl	Pld	W	D	L	GF	GA	GD	Pts	Position	Name	Goals	Res	Rec	Res	Rec	Res	Rec	Average home attendance
2004–05	Southern Football League; Division One East	8	42	14	10	18	53	67	-14	52	**13th of 22**			QR2	2-0-1	R1	1-0-1			
2005–06	Southern Football League; Division One East	8	42	15	11	16	58	65	-7	56	**10th of 22**; Transferred			QR1	1-0-1	QR1	0-0-1			
2006–07	Isthmian League; Division One North	8	42	13	11	18	44	63	-19	50	**18th of 22**			QR1	1-1-1	QR1	1-2-1			
2007–08	Isthmian League; Division One North	8	42	12	9	21	64	84	-20	45	**15th of 22**; Transferred			PR	0-0-1	QR1	1-0-1			
2008–09	Southern Football League; Division One Midlands	8	42	11	5	26	40	70	-30	38	**18th of 22**			QR2	2-1-1	PR	0-0-1			
2009–10	Southern Football League; Division One Midlands	8	42	17	10	15	58	48	10	61	**9th of 22**			QR1	1-0-1	R1	4-2-1			
2010–11	Southern Football League; Division One Central	8	42	30	7	5	108	34	74	88*	**1st of 22**; Promoted			QR1	1-1-1	QR2	2-2-1			
2011–12	Southern Football League; Premier Division	7	42	12	11	19	43	60	-17	47	**18th of 22**	Chris Dillon	12	QR1	0-0-1	QR2	1-0-1			170
2012–13	Southern Football League; Premier Division	7	42	21	6	15	70	51	+19	69	**6th of 22**	Drew Roberts	26	R1	4-0-1	QR2	1-1-1			178
2013–14	Southern Football League; Premier Division	7	44	15	10	19	68	79	-11	55	**15th of 23**	Jonny McNamara; Barry Hayles	10	QR3	2-1-1	R1	3-0-1			173
2014–15	Southern Football League; Premier Division	7	44	10	6	28	43	84	-41	36	**22nd of 23**; Relegated	Mark Gallagher	5	QR1	0-0-1	QR2	1-1-1			157
2015–16	Southern Football League; Division One Central	8	42	14	5	23	48	87	-39	47	**16th of 22**	Christian Tavernier	12	QR1	1-0-1	PR	0-1-1			94
2016–17	Southern Football League; Division One Central	8	42	14	8	20	55	69	-14	50	**15th of 22**	Jack Vasey	15	PR	0-1-1	PR	0-1-1			87
2017–18	Southern Football League; Division One East	8	42	3	5	34	36	123	-87	14	**22nd of 22**; Relegated			QR1	1-0-1	QR1	0-0-1			
2018–19	Spartan South Midlands Football League; Premier Division	9	38	16	7	15	64	70	-6	55	**8th of 20**			EPR	0-0-1	—	—	QR2	0-0-1	
2019–20	Spartan South Midlands Football League; Premier Division	9	28	7	12	9	44	48	-4	30	**16th of 21**			PR	2-1-1	—	—	QR1	0-0-1	
2020–21	Spartan South Midlands Football League; Premier Division	9	10	4	0	6	14	20	-6	12	**15th of 21**			EPR	0-0-1	—	—	QR2	1-0-1	
2021–22	Spartan South Midlands Football League; Premier Division	9	38	13	8	17	58	77	-19	47	**10th of 20**			PR	2-0-1	—	—	QR1	0-1-0	
2022–23	Spartan South Midlands Football League; Premier Division	9	38	8	9	21	39	66	-27	33	**17th of 20**			EPR	0-1-1	—	—	QR1	0-0-1	
2023–24	Spartan South Midlands Football League; Premier Division	9	36	9	7	20	36	69	-33	34	**16th of 20**	Rory Joe Busby	6	EPR	0-0-1	—	—	R1	2-1-0	
2024–25	Spartan South Midlands Football League; Premier Division	9	34	17	7	10	57	44	+13	58	**6th of 18**	Ezra Ford	8	EPR	0-0-1	—	—	R1	1-0-1	
