= 2013–14 Spartan South Midlands Football League =

The 2013–14 Spartan South Midlands Football League season (known as the 2013–14 Molten Spartan South Midlands Football League for sponsorship reasons) was the 17th in the history of Spartan South Midlands Football League a football competition in England.

== Premier Division ==
Spartan South Midlands Football League Premier Division
- Season: 2013–14
- Champions: Hanwell Town
- Promoted: Hanwell Town
- Relegated: Hatfield Town; London Lions
- Matches: 462
- Goals: 1,713 (3.71 per match)

The Premier Division featured 19 clubs which competed in the division last season, along with three clubs promoted from Division One:

- London Lions
- Cockfosters
- Hoddesdon Town

=== League table ===
Pos	Team	Pld	W	D	L	GF	GA	GD	Pts	Promotion or relegation
1	Hanwell Town	42	35	6	1	127	36	+91	111	Promoted to the Southern Football League
2	Ampthill Town	42	31	4	7	124	46	+78	97	
3	Colney Heath	42	26	10	6	92	36	+56	88	
4	St Margaretsbury	42	26	7	9	86	50	+36	85	
5	Berkhamsted	42	26	6	10	111	58	+53	84	
6	Hoddesdon Town	42	24	6	12	88	62	+26	78	
7	London Colney	42	22	6	14	88	64	+24	72	
8	Cockfosters	42	16	10	16	69	62	+7	58	
9	AFC Dunstable	42	15	13	14	74	69	+5	58	
10	Tring Athletic	42	16	10	16	71	70	+1	58	
11	Hillingdon Borough	42	17	7	18	90	91	−1	58	
12	Holmer Green	42	16	8	18	85	87	−2	56	
13	Hadley	42	14	10	18	52	67	−15	52	
14	Harefield United	42	14	8	20	85	82	+3	50	
15	London Tigers	42	14	7	21	70	75	−5	49	
16	Hertford Town	42	15	4	23	76	94	−18	49	
17	Biggleswade United	42	11	14	17	65	76	−11	47	
18	Oxhey Jets	42	13	8	21	74	99	−25	47	
19	Stotfold	42	14	5	23	49	91	−42	47	
20	Leverstock Green	42	10	4	28	57	117	−60	34	
21	Hatfield Town	42	3	5	34	42	152	−110	14	Relegated to Division One
22	London Lions	42	3	4	35	38	129	−91	13	Relegated to Division One

Updated to match(es) played on 7 May 2014. Source: goalrun.com
Rules for classification: 1) points; 2) goal difference; 3) number of goals scored.

=== Results ===
Home \ Away	AFD	AMP	BER	BIG	COC	COH	HAD	HAN	HAR	HAT	HER	HIL	HOD	HOL	LEV	LOC	LOL	LOT	OXJ	STM	STO	TRA
AFC Dunstable		0–1	2–2	1–2	1–1	0–3	1–2	0–0	2–0	1–0	1–1	1–1	0–4	1–5	4–1	3–0	3–1	2–2	1–3	2–2	3–0	2–0
Ampthill Town	3–0		0–2	5–1	2–0	5–4	3–0	0–0	1–1	4–1	3–0	8–3	2–0	2–1	5–1	3–1	7–0	4–2	5–0	0–1	6–2	1–4
Berkhamsted	2–1	2–1		5–4	1–3	0–1	1–0	0–1	3–1	9–1	4–2	4–2	3–2	2–4	5–0	4–0	1–0	3–0	5–0	1–1	4–0	1–0
Biggleswade United	1–5	1–4	2–2		1–1	0–2	1–1	1–2	2–2	5–1	1–0	2–1	2–2	4–1	1–3	1–1		1–1	0–0	2–1	1–1	0–0
Cockfosters	2–2	1–3	2–1	2–1		2–1	1–1	2–6	1–0	2–0	3–0	1–0	1–2	2–2	3–1	1–1	3–1	1–3	0–0	0–3	0–1	1–2
Colney Heath	4–0	1–0	3–0	2–1	1–1		1–2	1–2	3–1	1–1	3–1	4–1	1–0	2–1	4–0	0–2	4–0	1–0	0–0	3–0	1–1	2–0
Hadley	3–0	0–4	1–1	1–1	2–2	1–4		0–0	3–3	2–0	2–1	1–5	2–2	2–1	0–3	1–0	4–0	2–1	0–2	1–1	1–2	2–1
Hanwell Town	4–1	2–0	3–0	3–2	2–0	1–1	2–1		3–0	4–0	2–1	4–0	3–1	2–0	10–0	4–1	2–1	4–3	7–2	4–1	4–0	3–1
Harefield United	2–3	2–3	0–2	2–1	1–1	1–2	5–3	1–1		8–0	3–6	2–4	2–3	1–5	4–1	5–1	1–1	3–1	3–0	2–3	4–0	2–2
Hatfield Town	3–3	1–4	0–11	1–4	1–2	2–6	1–2	0–5	0–2		0–2	3–3	1–5	1–2	1–3	0–6	0–5	1–2	2–4	0–4	2–1	2–2
Hertford Town	1–4	3–8	0–2	3–1	3–2	0–2	2–1	0–2	3–2	2–4		2–3	1–2	2–1	1–2	4–3	3–2	3–3	0–3	1–3	2–1	1–1
Hillingdon Borough	1–1	1–4	3–0	3–1	1–0	3–3	4–2	1–4	0–3	5–0	0–4		2–3	2–0	4–1	3–3	2–1	3–1	3–2	0–1	2–3	2–4
Hoddesdon Town	1–1	4–2	2–4	2–1	2–1	0–4	1–0	1–3	1–2	2–2	0–1	3–2		4–0	1–0	0–2	4–0	1–2	2–1	3–2	3–1	2–1
Holmer Green	5–2	0–5	3–0	3–3	0–3	0–4	1–0	1–2	2–1	2–1	1–1	3–3	1–3		6–0	1–3	6–0	2–2	3–2	1–4	1–0	3–3
Leverstock Green	0–5	0–1	3–3	1–1	3–2	1–5	2–0	1–2	0–2	3–0	2–1	1–3	2–2	2–3		3–8	2–1	0–0	1–3	1–2	1–2	1–2
London Colney	0–0	1–2	1–2	3–0	0–2	3–0	2–0	2–1	3–0	4–2	2–1	2–1	0–1	6–3	2–1		1–0	1–2	3–1	4–1	1–2	4–4
London Lions	2–4	1–5	2–2	0–5	1–11	1–4	0–1	1–7	1–3	3–4	0–5	1–5	2–6	1–1	2–1	0–2		0–2	2–2	0–2	0–2	0–1
London Tigers	1–2	0–2	1–3	0–2	0–2	0–0	3–2	4–5	2–1	8–1	0–2	1–3	2–5	5–2	2–0	0–0	1–3		2–0	1–2	1–2	4–0
Oxhey Jets	0–5	0–0	2–6	4–1	1–2	0–2	0–2	0–4	1–1	3–1	9–5	1–1	1–0	2–4	3–1	3–2	3–2	0–1		2–4	6–5	1–1
St Margaretsbury	2–0	0–2	0–2	1–1	2–1	1–1	2–0	2–2	3–1	2–0	3–0	3–1	1–1	1–0	8–3	0–1	1–0	2–0	3–2		5–1	4–0
Stotfold	1–1	1–1	0–4	2–0	2–1	1–1	0–1	1–3	2–1	2–0	0–4	2–1	0–2	0–3	0–3	1–4	1–0	0–4	4–3	1–2		1–2
Tring Athletic	0–3	1–3	4–2	1–3	4–0	0–0	0–0	1–2	3–4	2–1	3–1	1–2	1–3	1–1	3–2	1–2	5–0	2–0	3–2	2–0	2–0	

Updated to match(es) played on 7 May 2014. Source: goalrun.com
Legend: Blue = home team win; Yellow = draw; Red = away team win.

== Division One ==
Spartan South Midlands Football League Division One
- Season: 2013–14
- Champions: Sun Postal Sports
- Promoted: Sun Postal Sports; Kings Langley
- Matches: 380
- Goals: 1,457 (3.83 per match)

Division One featured 20 clubs in the division for this season, of which there are four new clubs:

- Baldock Town, joined from the Herts County League
- Risborough Rangers, promoted from Division Two
- Broxbourne Borough, promoted from Division Two
- Arlesey Town Reserves, promoted from the Bedfordshire County Football League

=== League table ===
Pos	Team	Pld	W	D	L	GF	GA	GD	Pts	Promotion
1	Sun Postal Sports	38	30	3	5	120	39	+81	93	Promoted to the Premier Division
2	Kings Langley	38	27	5	6	133	31	+102	86	Promoted to the Premier Division
3	Bedford	38	26	8	4	108	32	+76	86	
4	Welwyn Garden City	38	24	3	11	118	52	+66	75	
5	Crawley Green	38	22	7	9	79	48	+31	73	
6	Broxbourne Borough	38	20	7	11	65	48	+17	67	
7	Baldock Town	38	19	8	11	82	54	+28	65	
8	Harpenden Town	38	17	9	12	88	79	+9	60	
9	Winslow United	38	18	5	15	85	55	+30	59	
10	Codicote	38	16	11	11	75	59	+16	59	
11	Southall	38	16	11	11	66	53	+13	59	
12	Chesham United Reserves	38	14	10	14	67	74	−7	52	
13	Buckingham Athletic	38	16	3	19	67	77	−10	51	
14	Risborough Rangers	38	11	10	17	53	59	−6	43	
15	Kentish Town	38	10	5	23	49	99	−50	35	Resigned from the league after the season
16	Amersham Town	38	8	4	26	41	88	−47	28	
17	Wodson Park	38	6	8	24	41	107	−66	26	
18	Stony Stratford Town	38	7	1	30	41	146	−105	22	
19	Langford	38	5	4	29	41	140	−99	19	
20	Arlesey Town Reserves	38	2	10	26	38	117	−79	16	

Updated to match(es) played on 3 May 2014. Source: goalrun.com
Rules for classification: 1) points; 2) goal difference; 3) number of goals scored.

=== Results ===
Home \ Away	AME	ARL	BAL	BED	BRX	BUA	CHE	COD	CRG	HAR	KEN	KIL	LAN	RIS	SOU	STS	SPS	WGC	WIN	WOP
Amersham Town		2–0	1–2	0–1	1–1	2–3	1–2	0–1	1–2	1–3	0–1	2–4	1–0	0–0	0–3	6–1	1–4	1–3	2–5	0–3
Arlesey Town Reserves	0–2		1–5	0–5	1–2	2–4	3–3	0–1	1–6	2–4	1–5	0–0	0–3	3–3	0–0	3–1	2–5	1–6	0–1	2–2
Baldock Town	1–2	3–0		2–2	1–1	7–0	1–3	1–0	2–1	1–1	3–0	1–2	2–2	1–0	5–3	5–1	0–2	1–2	2–1	7–0
Bedford	8–1	1–0	1–5		1–1	4–0	2–0	0–1	4–0	3–0	5–0	3–3	6–0	2–2	2–0	6–0	0–0	3–2	2–1	8–0
Broxbourne Borough	3–1	2–0	4–1	1–2		2–1	0–1	1–1	4–0	0–4	1–0	2–1	4–2	1–0	2–1	3–0	1–3	1–0	2–1	1–3
Buckingham Athletic	1–1	1–1	2–1	4–3	4–0		4–1	0–1	0–2	5–2	1–0	0–1	3–0	1–3	1–3	4–1	1–2	4–2	1–3	2–1
Chesham United Reserves	3–1	2–3	0–0	2–0	2–0	1–1		1–1	3–2	2–6	1–3	0–3	5–0	0–2	4–0	2–1	1–1	1–1	1–1	0–0
Codicote	1–1	2–2	0–1	1–2	1–1	1–4	8–3		2–2	1–1	2–2	0–4	6–1	3–0	1–3	6–0	0–3	0–2	2–1	5–0
Crawley Green	7–0	4–0	3–1	1–1	3–0	0–2	2–0	1–0		0–0	3–1	3–2	4–0	1–0	1–3	3–1	2–1	1–0	4–4	2–2
Harpenden Town	3–0	3–1	2–2	0–7	2–4	3–2	2–1	3–5	1–1		7–0	1–2	3–1	4–1	4–0	4–0	0–4	2–2	2–0	1–1
Kentish Town	3–0	1–1	1–2	0–4	1–1	2–0	0–4	1–3	0–0	1–0		2–6		1–2	0–4	3–4	0–1	0–9	3–2	3–4
Kings Langley	4–0	5–0	4–1	1–1	3–1	6–2	5–1	6–0	1–2	11–1	8–0		1–1	3–0	0–0	4–0	0–1	1–0	2–0	7–0
Langford	0–2	1–1	2–3	0–2	1–3	1–3	2–5	3–6	1–3	2–4	1–4	0–8		2–6	1–4	4–1	0–6	1–7	1–0	1–1
Risborough Rangers	1–0	4–1	2–2	0–1	0–0	1–3	2–3	1–3	1–2	0–0	0–2	0–1	9–1		0–0	2–1	0–2	1–0	1–1	5–1
Southall	0–1	0–0	0–0	0–2	3–0	2–0	2–2	1–1	0–4	1–1	5–2	1–3	8–0	0–0		2–0	4–2	0–3	2–2	3–1
Stony Stratford Town	2–1	7–2	0–2	1–4	0–9	3–1	2–3	1–1	3–0	0–7	1–3	0–10	2–1	0–3	1–2		0–5	0–4	1–3	2–1
Sun Postal Sports	3–0	3–1	3–0	1–4	1–3	3–1	4–1	0–0	1–0	4–0	3–2	2–1	8–1	5–0	5–2	10–0		5–2	2–1	6–2
Welwyn Garden City	2–0	9–1	2–1	1–3	1–2	3–0	3–1	3–1	3–4	7–3	5–1	3–2	3–1	4–0	2–2	10–1	4–1		0–3	4–0
Winslow United	6–2	3–0	3–5	1–1		4–0	4–1	1–4	1–0	4–1	5–1	0–2	6–0	3–0	0–1	5–1	1–3	1–2		6–1
Wodson Park	1–4	6–2	0–2	0–2	0–1	2–1	1–1	2–3	1–3	0–3	0–0	0–6	0–3	1–1	0–1	2–1	1–5	1–2	0–1	

Updated to match(es) played on 3 May 2014. Source: goalrun.com
Legend: Blue = home team win; Yellow = draw; Red = away team win.

== Division Two ==
Spartan South Midlands Football League Division Two
- Season: 2013–14
- Champions: Hale Leys United
- Matches: 182
- Goals: 705 (3.87 per match)

Division Two featured ten clubs which competed in the division last season, along with four new clubs:

- Brimsdown, new club
- Grendon Rangers, joined from the North Bucks & District League
- New Bradwell St Peter, relegated from Division One
- Willen

=== League table ===
Pos	Team	Pld	W	D	L	GF	GA	GD	Pts
1	Hale Leys United	26	22	2	2	93	26	+67	68
2	Kent Athletic	26	17	5	4	69	32	+37	56
3	Mursley United	26	17	5	4	60	28	+32	56
4	The 61	26	15	4	7	55	39	+16	49
5	Pitstone & Ivinghoe United	26	11	5	10	51	50	+1	38
6	Totternhoe	26	10	6	10	45	41	+4	36
7	Aston Clinton	26	11	2	13	45	54	−9	35
8	Old Bradwell United	26	10	3	13	57	57	0	33
9	Grendon Rangers	26	9	3	14	30	51	−21	30
10	Wolverton Town	26	8	5	13	47	60	−13	29
11	Tring Corinthians	26	7	7	12	36	54	−18	28
12	New Bradwell St Peter	26	7	4	15	45	70	−25	25
13	Brimsdown	26	4	5	17	35	58	−23	17
14	Willen	26	4	4	18	37	85	−48	16

Source: fchd
Rules for classification: 1) points; 2) goal difference; 3) number of goals scored.
