= 2019–20 Spartan South Midlands Football League =

The 2019–20 season was the 23rd in the history of Spartan South Midlands Football League, a football competition in England.

The allocations for Steps 1 to 6 for season 2019–20 were announced by the FA on 19 May. These were subject to appeal, and the Spartan South Midlands' constitution was ratified at the league's AGM on 22 June.

As a result of the COVID-19 pandemic, the season was formally cancelled on 26 March 2020, with all results from the being expunged, and no promotion or relegation taking place to, from, or within the competition. On 30 March 2020, sixty-six non-league clubs sent an open letter to the Football Association requesting that they reconsider their decision.

== Premier Division ==
Spartan South Midlands Football League Premier Division
- Season: 2019–20
- Matches: 301
- Goals: 1,005 (3.34 per match)

The Premier Division featured 15 clubs which competed in the division last season, along with six new clubs.

- Relegated from Southern League Division One Central:
  - Aylesbury Vale Dynamos, with a name change from Aylesbury
  - Dunstable Town
- Transferred from the United Counties League:
  - Eynesbury Rovers
  - Newport Pagnell Town
- Promoted from Division One:
  - Broadfields United
  - Harefield United

=== League table ===
Pos	Team	Pld	W	D	L	GF	GA	GD	Pts
1	Colney Heath	30	22	2	6	58	18	+40	68
2	Tring Athletic	31	20	2	9	80	34	+46	62
3	Biggleswade United	31	18	5	8	69	44	+25	59
4	Newport Pagnell Town	29	15	9	5	67	39	+28	54
5	Oxhey Jets	29	14	8	7	50	42	+8	50
6	Harpenden Town	29	15	4	10	56	46	+10	49
7	Leighton Town	26	15	3	8	63	39	+24	45 (Note: Leighton had a three points deduction for fielding a player whilst under suspension.)
8	Crawley Green	32	11	11	10	62	52	+10	44
9	Eynesbury Rovers	29	12	7	10	51	37	+14	43
10	Edgware Town	33	12	6	15	50	63	−13	42
11	Leverstock Green	28	12	2	14	31	48	−17	38
12	Baldock Town	29	11	3	15	42	54	−12	36
13	Potton United	28	10	5	13	41	53	−12	35
14	Dunstable Town	27	9	5	13	35	47	−12	32
15	Harefield United	27	8	7	12	41	48	−7	31
16	Arlesey Town	28	7	12	9	44	48	−4	30 (Note: Arlesey Town had a three points deduction for fielding an unregistered player.)
17	Broadfields United	29	8	6	15	38	65	−27	30
18	Aylesbury Vale Dynamos	26	8	5	13	36	54	−18	29
19	Wembley	29	6	9	14	33	46	−13	27
20	North Greenford United	24	5	4	15	30	57	−27	19
21	London Colney	28	3	5	20	28	71	−43	14

Updated to match(es) played on 11 March 2020. Source: FA Full Time
Rules for classification: 1) Points; 2) Goal difference; 3) Number of goals scored; 4) Number of matches won; 5) Head-to-head results

== Division One ==
Spartan South Midlands Football League Division One
- Season: 2019–20
- Matches: 262
- Goals: 1,107 (4.23 per match)

Division One featured 15 clubs in the division for this season, of which there are five new clubs:

- London Tigers, relegated from the Premier Division
- New Salamis, promoted from the Hertfordshire Senior County League
- Shefford Town & Campton, promoted from the Bedfordshire County League
- St Panteleimon, promoted from the Middlesex County League
- Stotfold, relegated from the Premier Division

=== League table ===
Pos	Team	Pld	W	D	L	GF	GA	GD	Pts	
1	New Salamis	29	20	5	4	117	41	+76	65	
2	St Panteleimon	27	20	5	2	88	33	+55	65	
3	Winslow United	27	18	1	8	81	50	+31	55	
4	Rayners Lane	28	16	7	5	78	56	+22	55	
5	Stotfold	26	17	3	6	68	25	+43	54	
6	Milton Keynes Robins	28	16	4	8	61	56	+5	52	
7	Shefford Town & Campton	31	16	1	14	73	66	+7	49	
8	Maccabi London Lions	27	11	6	10	45	40	+5	39	
9	F.C. Broxbourne Borough	26	9	10	7	44	45	−1	37	Resigned from the league
10	Ampthill Town	28	9	8	11	56	75	−19	35	
11	Amersham Town	27	10	2	15	47	76	−29	32	
12	Buckingham Athletic	26	9	4	13	53	59	−6	31	
13	Bedford	28	9	3	16	39	59	−20	30	
14	Enfield Borough	29	9	3	17	49	71	−22	30	
15	London Tigers	29	7	9	13	44	58	−14	29 (Note: London Tigers had a one point deduction for fielding an unregistered player.)	
16	Langford	27	7	5	15	49	70	−21	26	
17	Hillingdon Borough	27	6	6	15	38	72	−34	24	
18	Park View	26	5	3	18	38	69	−31	18	
19	Brimsdown	28	2	7	19	39	86	−47	13	Transferred to the Eastern Counties League
20	Wodson Park	0	0	0	0	0	0	0	0 (Note: Wodson Park withdrew from the league in October 2019, all results expunged)	Club folded, record expunged

Updated to match(es) played on 11 March 2020. Source: FA Full-Time
Rules for classification: 1) Points; 2) Goal difference; 3) Number of goals scored; 4) Number of matches won; 5) Head-to-head results

== Division Two ==
Spartan South Midlands Football League Division Two
- Season: 2019–20
- Matches: 125
- Goals: 494 (3.95 per match)

Division Two featured 13 clubs which competed in the division last season, along with two new clubs:

- Buckingham United, joined from the North Bucks & District League
- Codicote, relegated from Division One

=== League table ===
Pos	Team	Pld	W	D	L	GF	GA	GD	Pts	Promotion
1	Old Bradwell United	15	13	0	2	49	11	+38	39	
2	Pitstone & Ivinghoe	20	13	3	4	55	27	+28	39 (Note: Pitstone & Ivinghoe were deducted three points.)	
3	Codicote	19	10	4	5	29	24	+5	34	
4	MK Gallacticos	16	8	3	5	49	34	+15	27	
5	Aston Clinton	15	8	3	4	38	26	+12	27	
6	Berkhamsted Raiders	17	8	1	8	43	35	+8	25	
7	Sarratt	18	6	6	6	29	30	−1	23 (Note: Sarratt were deducted one point.)	
8	Mursley United	13	7	1	5	30	32	−2	22	
9	New Bradwell St Peter	16	5	6	5	26	26	0	21	
10	Tring Corinthians	18	7	2	9	34	29	+5	20 (Note: Tring Corinthians were deducted three points.)	
11	Bovingdon	17	5	3	9	27	26	+1	18	
12	Unite MK	16	5	3	8	30	49	−19	18	Merged with Milton Keynes Robins
13	Buckingham United	16	5	2	9	17	34	−17	17	
14	Totternhoe	16	4	4	8	20	30	−10	16	
15	The 61	18	0	1	17	18	81	−63	1	

Source: FA Full-Time
Rules for classification: 1) points; 2) goal difference; 3) number of goals scored.
