= BBFC (disambiguation) =

The British Board of Film Classification (BBFC) is an organisation responsible for the national classification and censorship of films within the United Kingdom.

BBFC may also refer to:

- Bacup Borough F.C.
- Bamber Bridge F.C.
- Broxbourne Borough F.C.
