= Brimsdown F.C. =

Association football club in England

Coordinates: 51.5035°N 0.2613°E

Brimsdown
- Full name: Brimsdown Football Club
- Nickname: The Brims
- Founded: 2013
- Ground: Parkside, Aveley
- Capacity: 3,500 (424 seated)
- Chairman: Ahmet Toygun
- Manager: Leon Braithwaite
- League: Eastern Counties League Division One South
- 2025–26: Eastern Counties League Division One South, 7th of 21
- Website: brimsdownfc.com
Home colours	Away colours

Brimsdown Football Club is a football club based in Brimsdown in the London Borough of Enfield, England. They are currently members of the Eastern Counties League Division One South and play at Aveley's Parkside ground.

== History ==
Brimsdown was established in 2013 by Lee Okugbeni, manager of the Kentish Town under-18 team. The club was admitted to Division Two of the Spartan South Midlands League for the 2013–14 season. Despite finishing second-from-bottom in their first season, the club finished fourth in the 2014–15 season. When Hale Leys United and Kent Athletic, who had finished first and second respectively, were unable to take promotion due to inadequate grounds, Brimsdown were promoted to Division One. The 2015–16 season saw the club enter the FA Vase for the first time. In February 2018 Ahmet Toygun and Yilmaz Celik took over the club's ownership. By May 2020 Toygun became the sole owner, integrating his football academy into the club.

At the end of the 2019–20 season Brimsdown were transferred to Division One South of the Eastern Counties League as a result of a groundshare with Tilbury. They finished bottom of Division One South in 2021–22 and were relegated to the Senior Division of the Essex Alliance. However, they were Essex Alliance champions the following season, earning promotion back to Division One South.

== Ground ==
The club initially played on the second pitch at the Downs in Enfield, before moving to Goldsdown Road in 2014 after Enfield 1893 vacated the ground. In 2015–16 they groundshared at Enfield Town's Queen Elizabeth II Stadium, before moving to Haringey Borough's Coles Park in Tottenham in 2016, and then Ware's Wodson Park in 2018. They moved to Tilbury's Chadfields ground in 2020, and then to Wormley Rovers in 2022. The club relocated to Parkside in Aveley in 2026.

== Honours ==
- Essex Alliance Football League
  - Senior Division champions 2022–23

== Records ==
- Best FA Vase performance: First round, 2018–19, 2024–25, 2025–26

== See also ==
- Brimsdown F.C. players
