= Maccabi London Lions F.C. =

Association football club in England

Coordinates: 51°39′6″N 0°14′49″W

Maccabi London Lions
- Full name: Maccabi London Lions Football Club
- Nickname: The Lions
- Founded: 1995
- Ground: Rowley Lane, Arkley
- Chairman: Andrew Landesberg
- Manager: Andrew Landesberg
- League: Southern League Division One Central
- 2025–26: Southern League Division One Central, 18th of 22
Home colours	Away colours

Maccabi London Lions Football Club is a football club based in Barnet, London, England. The Saturday team of the Maccabi London Lions football club are currently members of the Southern League Division One Central and play at Rowley Lane in Arkley.

== History ==
The club was established as MALEX in 1995 by Maccabi Association London who were seeking a new challenge beyond Sunday league football. The new club joined Division One of the Hertfordshire Senior County League. In 1999 they were renamed London Lions, but remained an all-Jewish club. Their first season under the new name saw them win the Division One title, earning promotion to the Premier Division. In 2006–07 the club won the Herts Senior Centenary Trophy, beating Metropolitan Police in the final.

Maccabi London Lions were Premier Division runners-up in 2008–09 and went on to win the league in 2009–10, resulting in promotion to Division One of the Spartan South Midlands League. They won the Herts Senior Centenary Trophy for a second time the following season with a 3–2 win over Letchworth Garden City Eagles in the final. In 2012–13 the club won the Division One title, resulting in promotion to the Premier Division. However, they finished bottom of the Premier Division the following season and were relegated back to Division One.

After finishing seventeenth in Division One in 2014–15, Maccabi London Lions dropped back into the Premier Division of the Hertfordshire Senior County League. Renamed Maccabi London Lions, they won the Anagram Records Trophy in 2015–16. The following season saw the club win the Herts Senior Centenary Trophy, the league's Aubrey Cup and the Premier Division title, resulting in promotion back to Division One of the Spartan South Midlands League. In 2017–18 the club won the Division One Cup with a 3–1 win over Southall in the final. The following season saw them win the Herts Senior Centenary Trophy, defeating Belstone 5–1 in the final. Following the curtailment of the 2020–21 season due to the COVID-19 pandemic, the club won the Spring Cup, an emergency competition organised by the league.

At the end of the 2020–21 season Maccabi London Lions were transferred to Division One of the Combined Counties League, which the club won at the first attempt to earn promotion to the Premier North Division; later completing a double by winning the Division One Challenge Cup. They were transferred back to the Premier Division of the Spartan South Midlands League for the 2023–24 season. In 2024–25 the club finished fourth in the Premier Division, qualifying for the promotion play-offs. After beating Cockfosters on penalties in the semi-finals, they defeated Wormley Rovers on penalties in the final to secure promotion to Division One Central of the Southern League.

== Ground ==
The club were initially based at the International University in Bushey before moving several times and playing at grounds including the Copthall Stadium in Hendon and the Gosling Stadium. In 2002 they relocated to Rowley Lane in Arkley. However, when the club were promoted to the Spartan South Midlands League in 2010, they were required to groundshare at St Albans City, Broxbourne Borough and Hemel Hempstead Town as Rowley Lane did not have floodlights or a stand. In 2015 the club returned to Rowley Lane after floodlights were installed and the Alan Mattey Stand erected, named after a former player who died in 2006.

== Honours ==
- Spartan South Midlands League
  - Division One champions 2012–13
  - Division One Cup winners 2017–18
  - Spring Cup winners 2020–21
- Combined Counties Football League
  - Division One champions 2021–22
  - Division One Challenge Cup winners 2021–22
- Hertfordshire Senior County League
  - Premier Division champions 2009–10, 2016–17
  - Division One champions 1999–2000
  - Aubrey Cup winners 2016–17
- Anagram Records Trophy
  - Winners 2015–16
- Herts Senior Centenary Trophy
  - Winners 2006–07, 2010–11, 2016–17, 2018–19

== Records ==
- Best FA Cup performance: First qualifying round, 2012–13
- Best FA Trophy performance: First qualifying round, 2025–26
- Best FA Vase performance: Fourth round, 2021–22, 2024–25
- Biggest win: 14–2 vs Bedmond S&S, Hertfordshire Senior County League Premier Division, 2009–10
- Heaviest defeat: 11–1 vs Cockfosters, Spartan South Midlands League Premier Division, 2013–14
- Most appearances: Adam Myeroff, 507
- Most goals: Austin Lipman, 210

== See also ==
- Maccabi London Lions F.C. players
