= Cockfosters F.C. =

Association football club in England

Coordinates: 51°39′12″N 0°9′7″W

Cockfosters
- Full name: Cockfosters Football Club
- Nickname: Fosters
- Founded: 1921
- Ground: Chalk Lane, Cockfosters
- Chairman: Vas Chiotis
- Manager: Terry Spillane
- League: Spartan South Midlands League Premier Division
- 2025–26: Spartan South Midlands League Premier Division, 4th of 20
Home colours

Cockfosters Football Club is a football club based in Cockfosters in the London Borough of Enfield, England. They are currently members of the Spartan South Midlands League Premier Division and play at the Cockfosters Sports Ground on Chalk Lane.

== History ==
The club was established in 1921 as Cockfosters Athletic and joined the Barnet League. Cockfosters Juniors merged into the club at the start of the 1930s, and they subsequently joined the Wood Green League. They won Division Two in 1931–32 and Division One in 1933–34. The 1938–39 season saw them win the Premier Division, League Cup and Barnet Cup. Following World War II the club joined Division One of the Northern Suburban Intermediate League, and after finishing as runners-up in 1946–47, they were promoted to the Premier Division. Although they were relegated back to Division One a year later, they won Division One in 1949–50 to earn promotion back to the Premier Division. The following season saw them finish as Premier Division runners-up.

Cockfosters won Division One again in 1960–61 and, after being promoted, were Premier Division champions the following season. In 1966 they joined Division One of the Hertfordshire Senior County League, and after winning it in their first season, they were promoted to the Premier Division. In 1968 "Athletic" was dropped from the club's name. They won the London Intermediate Cup in 1970–71, beating Clapton Reserves 2–1 in a replayed final. They won the Premier Division title in 1978–79, also winning the Herts Intermediate Cup and the league's Aubrey Cup. The club were Premier Division champions again in 1980–81 and 1983–84, and won the Aubrey Cup again in 1984–85. The 1989–90 season saw them win the London Intermediate Cup for a second time, beating Port of London Authority 1–0 in the final.

In 1990 Cockfosters moved up to the Premier Division of the Spartan League. When the league merged with the South Midlands League to form the Spartan South Midlands League in 1997, the club were placed in the Premier Division South. After finishing bottom of the division in the 1997–98 season, they were placed in the Senior Division for the following season; the division was renamed Division One in 2001. In 2006–07 Cockfosters were Division One runners-up, earning promotion to the Premier Division. The following season saw them win the league's Floodlit Cup. However, they were relegated back to Division One at the end of the 2008–09 season. The 2012–13 season saw them finish as Division One runners-up again, resulting in promotion to the Premier Division. In 2013–14 they won the league's Challenge Trophy and Floodlit Cup.

At the end of the 2018–19 season Cockfosters were transferred to the Essex Senior League. They were moved back to the Premier Division of the Spartan South Midlands League in 2022. In 2024–25 the club finished third in the Premier Division and qualified for the promotion play-offs, subsequently losing on penalties to Maccabi London Lions in the semi-finals. They finished fourth in the league the following season, going on to beat Risborough Rangers 1–0 in the play-off semi-finals, before losing 2–0 to Winslow United in the final. The season also saw them reach the final of the FA Vase, in which they lost to AFC Stoneham on penalties after the game ended 0–0.

== Ground ==
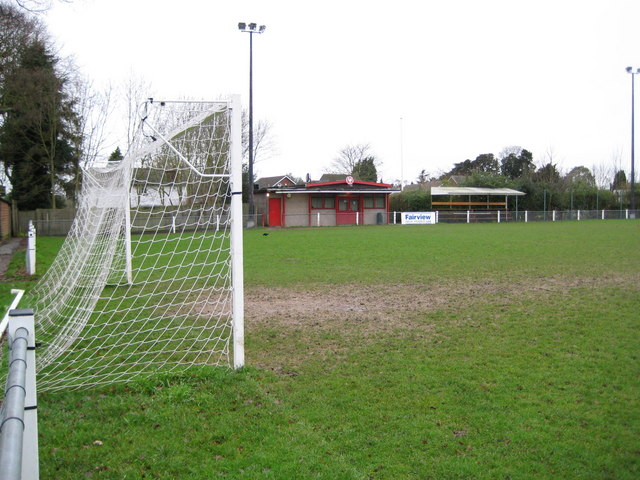
The club's home ground

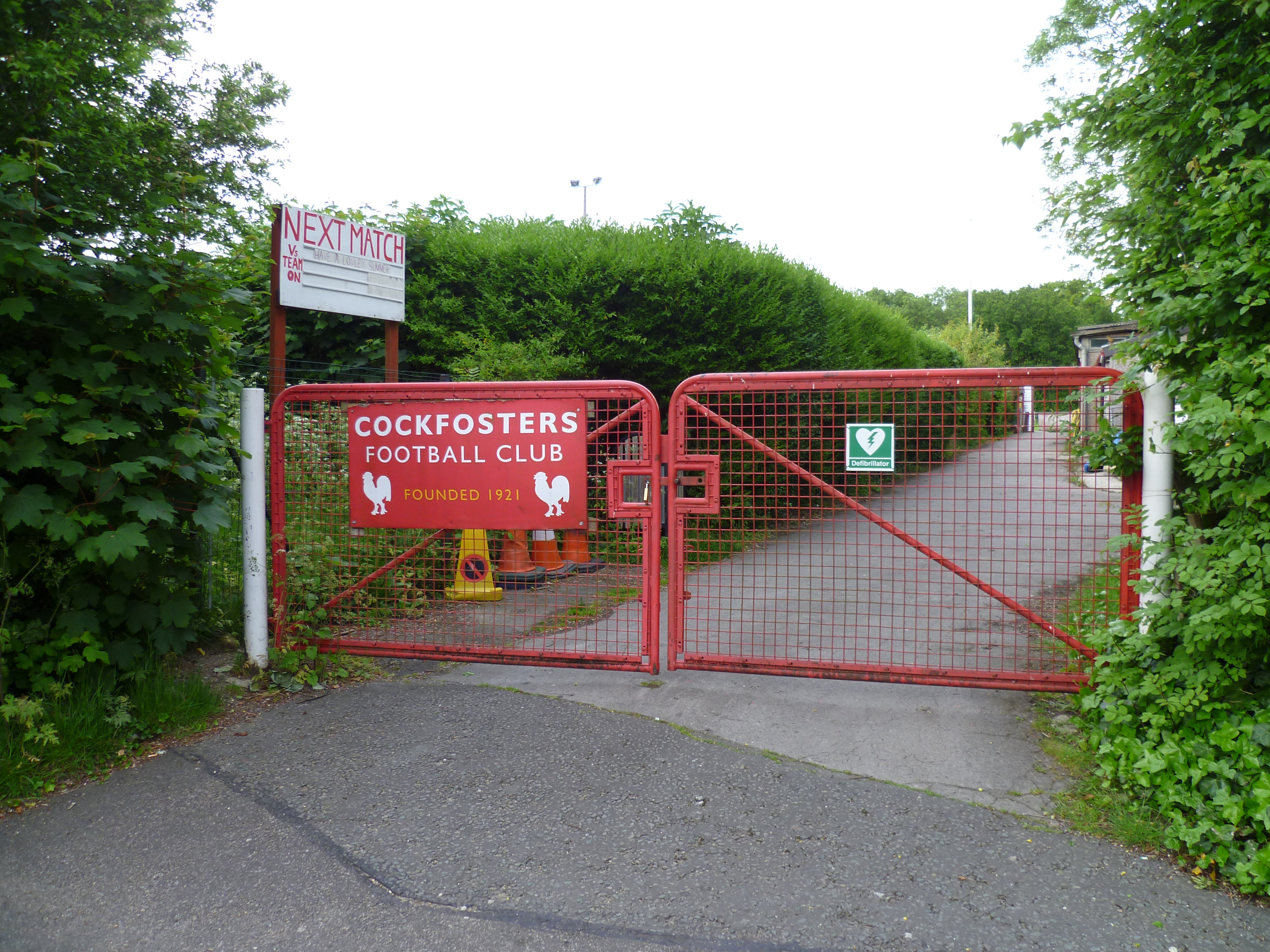
Cockfosters Football Club gate

The club have played at the Cockfosters Sports Ground on Chalk Lane since their foundation, with the site given to the club by Lady Bevan.

== Honours ==
- Spartan South Midlands League
  - Challenge Trophy winners 2013–14
  - Floodlit Cup winners 2007–08, 2013–14
- Hertfordshire Senior County League
  - Premier Division champions 1978–79, 1980–81, 1983–84
  - Division One champions 1966–67
  - Aubrey Cup winners 1978–79, 1984–85
- Northern Suburban Intermediate League
  - Premier Division champions 1961–62
  - Division One champions 1949–50, 1960–61
- Wood Green League
  - Premier Division champions 1938–39
  - Division One champions 1933–34
  - Division Two champions 1931–32
  - League Cup winners 1938–39
- London Intermediate Cup
  - Winners 1970–71, 1989–90
- Herts Intermediate Cup
  - Winners 1978–79
- Barnet Cup
  - Winners 1938–39, 1948–49, 1949–50, 1962–63

== Records ==
- Best FA Cup performance: First qualifying round, 2013–14, 2015–16, 2017–18, 2025–26
- Best FA Vase performance: Runners-up, 2025–26

== See also ==
- Cockfosters F.C. players
