= Ampthill Town F.C. =

Association football club in England

Coordinates: 52°01′58″N 0°30′13″W

Ampthill Town
- Full name: Ampthill Town Football Club
- Nickname: The Amps
- Founded: 1881
- Ground: The ANCO Stadium at Ampthill Park, Ampthill
- Capacity: 1300
- Chairman: Gary Maidment
- Manager: Chris Harvey
- League: Spartan South Midlands League Division One
- 2025–26: Spartan South Midlands League Division One, 4th of 21
Home colours

Ampthill Town Football Club is a football club based in Ampthill, Bedfordshire, England. The club are currently members of Spartan South Midlands League Division One and play at Ampthill Park. They are affiliated to the Bedfordshire County Football Association.

== History ==
The club were established in 1881. They joined the South Midlands League in 1951 and were placed in the Premier Division. They were Premier Division champions in 1959–60 and runners-up the following season.

After finishing bottom of the Premier Division in 1964–65 the club switched to Division Two of the United Counties League. They were promoted to Division One at the end of the 1969–70 season despite only finishing sixth. The following season the club's reserve team also joined the UCL and were placed in Division Three.

In 1972 Division One was renamed the Premier Division, with Division Three becoming Division Two. The reserves finished second in Division Two in 1977–78, earning promotion to Division One. However, in 1980 they were moved into the league's reserve divisions. The first team remained in the Premier Division until the end of the 1986–87 season, when they finished bottom of the table and were relegated to Division One.

In 1991 the club returned to the South Midlands League, joining Division One. When the league was reorganised in 1993, they were placed in the Senior Division. In 1997 the league merged with the Spartan League to form the Spartan South Midlands League, with Ampthill placed in the Senior Division. They finished bottom of table in 1997–98 and were relegated to Division One. However, the following season they were runners-up, earning promotion back to the Senior Division. Despite being runners-up in the Senior Division in 1999–2000, the club were denied back-to-back promotions.

In 2001 the Senior Division was renamed Division One, with the club remaining in the division until 2011, when a second-placed finish saw them promoted to the Premier Division. After finishing fifth in 2012–13, they were Premier Division runners-up in 2013–14, a season in which they also reached the quarter-finals of the FA Vase. However, the following season the club finished second-from-bottom in the table and were relegated back to Division One.

The 2021–22 season saw Ampthill finish as runners-up in Division One, qualifying for the promotion play-offs. However, they were beaten 3–2 by Wellingborough Whitworth in the semi-finals. The club finished fourth in Division One in 2025–26, before losing on penalties to Eaton Socon in the play-off semi-finals.

== Honours ==
- Spartan South Midlands League
  - Premier Division Cup winners 2013–14
- South Midlands League
  - Premier Division champions 1959–60
- Bedfordshire Senior Trophy
  - Winners 2011–12, 2015–16
- Bedfordshire Intermediate Cup
  - Winners 1998–99

== Records ==
- Best FA Cup performance: First qualifying round, 1981–82, 1983–84, 1984–85, 1986–87
- Best FA Vase performance: Quarter-finals, 2013–14

== See also ==
- Ampthill Town F.C. players
