= Unite MK F.C. =

Association football club in England

Unite MK
- Full name: Unite MK
- Founded: 2004
- Dissolved: 2020
- Ground: Manor Fields, Milton Keynes
- Chairman: Nathan Hunt
- Manager: Nick Crossley
- League: Spartan South Midlands League Division Two
- 2017–18: Spartan South Midlands League Division Two, 9th of 17
Home colours

Unite MK was a football club based in Milton Keynes, Buckinghamshire, England.

== History ==
The club was founded in 2004 as Wolverton Town, joining the Milton Keynes Sunday League. In 2005, the club joined the North Bucks & District League. In 2012–13, the club joined the Spartan South Midlands League Division Two. In July 2016, the club renamed to Unite MK. Unite MK entered the FA Vase for the first time in 2018–19.

On 30 May 2020, Unite MK, Milton Keynes Robins and Milton Keynes Irish Veterans merged, forming Milton Keynes Irish.

== Ground ==
The club currently play at Manor Fields in the Fenny Stratford area of Milton Keynes, having moved to the ground in 2016. Unite MK previously played at The New Park in Greenleys.

== Records ==
- Best FA Vase performance: First qualifying round, 2018–19
