= Wodson Park F.C. =

Association football club in England

Coordinates: 51°49′24.4″N 0°01′55.7″W

Wodson Park
- Full name: Wodson Park Football Club
- Founded: 1997
- Ground: Wodson Park Sports Centre, Ware
- 2019–20: Spartan South Midlands League Division One (resigned)
| Home colours | Away colours |

Wodson Park Football Club is a football club based in Ware, Hertfordshire, England. Affiliated to the Hertfordshire County Football Association, they play at the Wodson Park Sports Centre.

== History ==
The club was founded by John Murphy in 1997, joining Division Three of the Hertford & District League. After winning the division in their first season they were promoted to Division Two. They were promoted again the following season and then won Division One in 1999–2000, earning promotion to the Premier Division.

In 2006 Wodson Park moved up to Division One of the Hertfordshire Senior County League. They were runners-up in the division in 2007–08 and rather than being promoted to the Premier Division, they moved up to Division Two of the Spartan South Midlands League. They finished fourth in Division Two in 2009–10, resulting in promotion to Division One. The club withdrew from the league in October 2019 due to difficulties in securing a manager and players. However, the youth and women's section continue to run.

== Ground ==
The club play at the Wodson Park Sports and Leisure Centre. After being promoted to Division One of the Spartan South Midlands League in 2011, the men's team started groundsharing at Ware's Wodson Park ground located next to the leisure centre. They returned to the Sports and Leisure Centre in 2013. A new stand was opened in 2016.

== Honours ==
- Hertford & District League
  - Division One champions 1999–2000
  - Division Three champions 1997–98

== Records ==
- Best FA Cup performance: Extra preliminary round, 2011–12, 2012–13, 2018–19
- Best FA Vase performance: Second round, 2018–19
