= F.C. Broxbourne Borough =

Association football club in England

Coordinates: 51.705866°N 0.059874281°W

FC Broxbourne Borough
- Full name: Football Club Broxbourne Borough
- Nickname(s): Boro
- Founded: 1991
- Dissolved: 2020
- Ground: Goffs Lane, Cheshunt
- Capacity: 5,000 (300 seated)
- 2019–20: Spartan South Midlands League Division One (season abandoned)
Home colours	Away colours

Football Club Broxbourne Borough was a football club based in Broxbourne, Hertfordshire, England. They played at Goffs Lane in Cheshunt.

== History ==
Somersett Football Club, a team for former pupils of Chase Boys School in nearby Enfield, was established in 1959. They started playing in the Edmonton Youth Saturday League, but failed to win a match in their first two seasons. In 1961 they switched to the Enfield Alliance League. Although they finished bottom of the league in their first season, they later began to progress up the league, winning successive promotions to reach the Premier Division. In 1982 the club absorbed Cheshunt Rangers, and in 1989 they switched to the McMullen League.

In 1991 the club merged with Ambury, a Sunday league team to form Somersett Ambury V&E or SAVE, the V&E part of the name taken from the Victoria & Elms youth club based at the Goffs Lane ground. In 1993 they joined Division One of the Hertfordshire Senior County League, and after winning the division in 1993–94, they were promoted to the Premier Division. They finished as runners-up in 1997–98, and were promoted to the Premier Division of the Spartan South Midlands League. In 2002 the club was renamed Broxbourne Borough V&E. In 2008–09 they won the Herts Charity Cup, but the club folded in 2012.

The club were subsequently reformed as Broxbourne Borough and dropped into Division Two of the Spartan South Midlands League. They finished third in 2012–13, earning promotion to Division One. They were renamed F.C. Broxbourne Borough. The 2014–15 season saw them finish as runners-up, resulting in promotion to the Premier Division. After the 2019–20 season was abandoned due to the COVID-19 pandemic, the club announced they would not be entering a league for the 2020–21 season.

== Ground ==
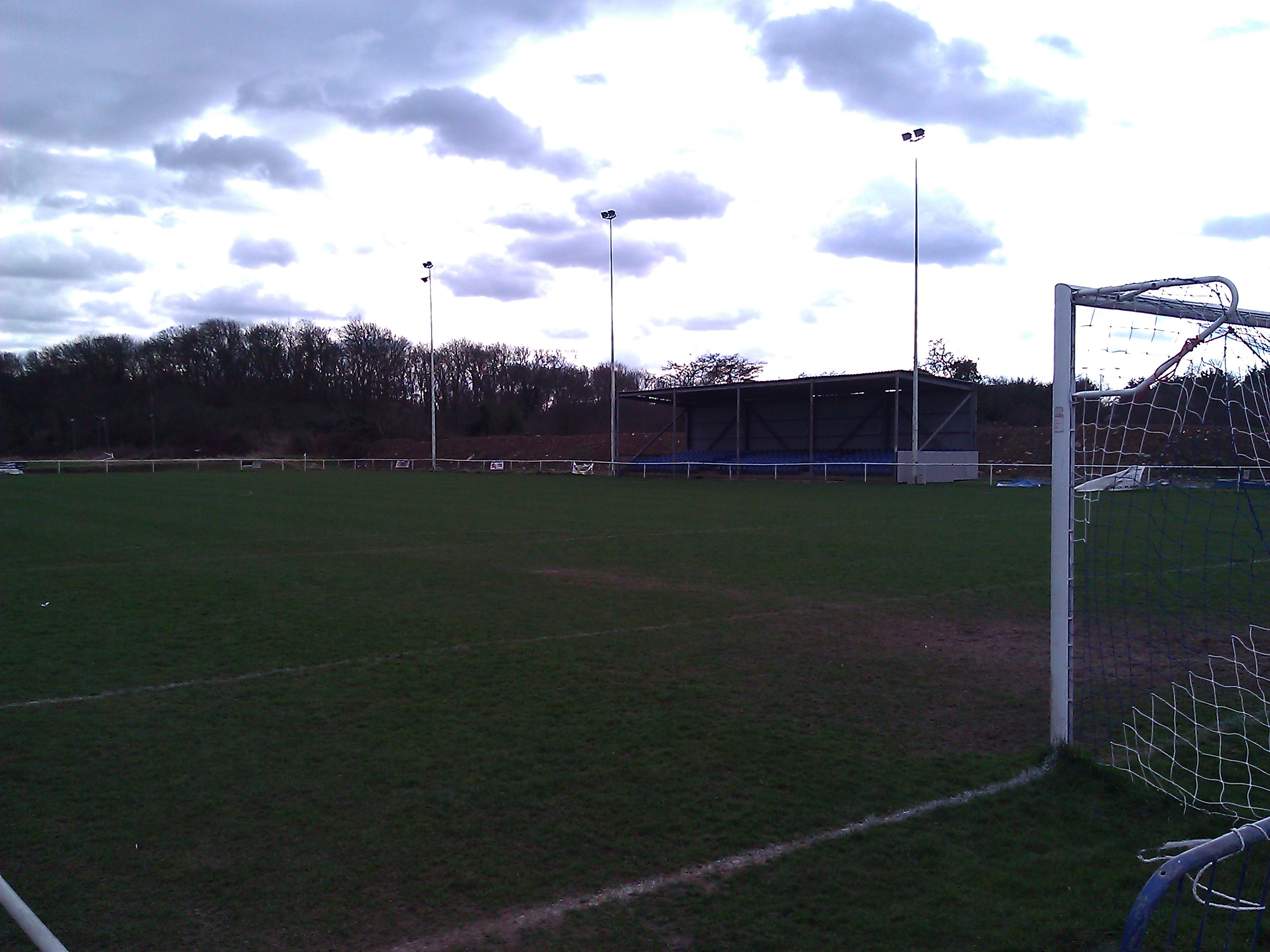
Goffs Lane

The club moved to Goffs Lane in 1975 following an invitation by the Victoria & Elms Youth Club. A new clubhouse and stand was built in 2005. The ground currently has a capacity of 5,000, of which 300 is seated.

== Honours ==
- Hertfordshire Senior County League
  - Division One champions 1993–94
- Herts Charity Cup
  - Winners 2008–09

== Records ==
- Best FA Cup performance: Second qualifying round, 2001–02
- Best FA Vase performance: Fourth round, 2005–06

== See also ==
- F.C. Broxbourne Borough players
