= Oxhey Jets F.C. =

Association football club in England

Coordinates: 51°37′05″N 0°22′55″W

Oxhey Jets
- Full name: Oxhey Jets Football Club
- Nickname: The Jets
- Founded: 1972
- Ground: The Boundary Stadium
- Capacity: 2,000
- Chairman: Phil Andrews
- Manager: David Barnes and Tom Inch (Co-Management)
- League: Combined Counties League Division one
- 2025–26: Combined Counties League Division One, 14th of 23
Home colours	Away colours

Oxhey Jets Football Club is an English semi-professional football club based in South Oxhey - a suburb of Watford, Hertfordshire. Founded by John R Elliott BEM, their General Manager. They currently compete in the Combined Counties League Division one and play their home matches at The Boundary Stadium on Altham Way. The club is affiliated to the Hertfordshire Football Association.

== History ==
Oxhey Jets Football Club was formed in 1972 as a youth team, before progressing into a senior team in the early 1980s. The Jets joined the Herts Senior County League in 1981, competing in Division One. After gaining promotion in 1989, the club spent fifteen seasons in the Premier Division before being rewarded with a place in the Spartan South Midlands League in 2004.

The 2004–05 season saw The Jets gain their second successive promotion when they became Spartan South Midlands League Division One champions. As a result of competing in the Premier Division in the 2005–06 season, they were able to make their debut in the FA Cup. Unfortunately, The Jets lost at home to Lowestoft Town in the preliminary round. In February 2012, Oxhey Jets became only the second ever Spartan South Midlands League club to reach the final of the Herts Senior Cup, when they overcame Cheshunt in the semi-final. They were beaten 7–2 in the final by Bishop's Stortford.

Having spent 18 years as part of the Spartan South Midlands League, in May 2022 Oxhey Jets were unexpectedly shuffled sideways into the Combined Counties League Premier Division North from the 2022–23 season.

== Honours ==
=== League ===
- Spartan South Midlands League Division One :
  - Champions: 2004–05
- Herts Senior County League Premier Division:
  - Champions: 2000–01, 2001–02, 2002–03
  - Runners-up: 2003–04

=== Cup ===
- Herts Senior Cup:
  - Finalists: 2011–12
- Hertfordshire Senior Centenary Trophy:
  - Winners: 2001–02, 2004–05, 2019–20 (shared)
- Hertfordshire Charity Shield:
  - Winners: 2009–10, 2011–12, 2012–13
  - Finalists: 2023–24
- Spartan South Midlands League Premier Division Cup:
  - Finalists: 2006–07
- Spartan South Midlands League Division One Cup:
  - Finalists: 2004–05
- Spartan South Midlands League Senior Floodlit Cup:
  - Finalists: 2008–09, 2012–13
- West Herts St Mary's Cup:
  - Winners: 2011–12, 2013–14
  - Finalists: 2007–08, 2009–10
- Aubrey Cup:
  - Winners: 2001–02, 2002–03

== Records ==
- League: 3rd (Spartan South Midlands League Premier Division), 2012–13
- FA Cup: 2nd Qualifying Round, 2006–07, 2011–12
- FA Vase: 3rd Round, 2006–07, 2012–2013
- Attendance: 376 v Hendon (FA Cup 2nd Qualifying Round), 2011–12
