= 1998–99 Spartan South Midlands Football League =

The 1998–99 Spartan South Midlands Football League season was the 2nd in the history of Spartan South Midlands Football League.

== Premier Division ==
Spartan South Midlands Football League Premier Division
- Season: 1998–99
- Champions: Barkingside
- Relegated: Brimsdown Rovers
- Matches: 506
- Goals: 1,632 (3.23 per match)

At the end of the previous season regional Premier Division North and Premier Division South merged with the first ten clubs from both divisions to form new Premier Division. The Premier Division featured 23 clubs.

- Ten clubs come from Premier Division North:
  - Arlesey Town
  - Brache Sparta
  - Buckingham Athletic
  - Harpenden Town
  - Hoddesdon Town
  - London Colney
  - Potters Bar Town
  - Royston Town
  - Toddington Rovers
  - Welwyn Garden City
- Ten clubs come from Premier Division South:
  - Barkingside
  - Beaconsfield SYCOB
  - Brimsdown Rovers
  - Brook House
  - Haringey Borough
  - Hillingdon Borough
  - Islington St Mary's
  - Ruislip Manor
  - St Margaretsbury
  - Waltham Abbey
- Two clubs promoted from the Senior Division:
  - Milton Keynes City, changed name from Mercedes Benz
  - New Bradwell St Peter
- One club joined from the Herts County League:
  - Somersett Ambury V&E

=== League table ===
Pos	Team	Pld	W	D	L	GF	GA	GD	Pts	Relegation
1	Barkingside	44	30	6	8	97	44	+53	96	Resigned from the league
2	Potters Bar Town	44	29	7	8	109	30	+79	94	
3	London Colney	44	29	5	10	98	28	+70	92	
4	Beaconsfield SYCOB	44	25	9	10	85	40	+45	84	
5	Brook House	44	24	11	9	74	42	+32	83	
6	Hoddesdon Town	44	24	7	13	80	60	+20	79	
7	Toddington Rovers	44	22	12	10	72	48	+24	78	Resigned from the league
8	Ruislip Manor	44	22	10	12	89	60	+29	76	
9	Royston Town	44	19	11	14	73	62	+11	68	
10	Hillingdon Borough	44	20	9	15	72	61	+11	65 (Note: Hillingdon Borough deducted four points.)	
11	Waltham Abbey	44	16	13	15	79	64	+15	61	
12	Brache Sparta	44	17	6	21	80	74	+6	57	
13	Arlesey Town	44	16	8	20	61	70	−9	56	
14	New Bradwell St Peter	44	15	11	18	56	70	−14	56	
15	Buckingham Athletic	44	15	9	20	65	101	−36	54	Demoted to Division One
16	Milton Keynes City	44	13	10	21	68	88	−20	49	
17	Islington St Mary's	44	11	14	19	55	85	−30	47	Resigned from the league
18	Somersett Ambury V&E	44	13	6	25	50	103	−53	45	
19	St Margaretsbury	44	12	10	22	75	98	−23	43 (Note: St Margaretsbury deducted three points.)	
20	Haringey Borough	44	9	11	24	49	87	−38	38	
21	Welwyn Garden City	44	10	6	28	63	95	−32	36	
22	Harpenden Town	44	9	9	26	47	86	−39	36	
23	Brimsdown Rovers	44	3	6	35	35	136	−101	15	Relegated to the Senior Division

Source: fchd
Rules for classification: 1) points; 2) goal difference; 3) number of goals scored.

== Senior Division ==
Spartan South Midlands Football League Senior Division
- Season: 1998–99
- Champions: Holmer Green
- Promoted: Holmer Green; Hanwell Town; Biggleswade Town
- Relegated: Winslow United
- Matches: 462
- Goals: 1,608 (3.48 per match)

At the end of the previous season regional Premier Division North and Premier Division South merged with the first ten clubs from both divisions to form new Premier Division, while all other Premier divisions clubs relegated to the Senior Division. The Senior Division featured eleven clubs which competed in the division last season, along with eleven new clubs.

- Five clubs relegated from Premier Division North:
  - Bedford United
  - Biggleswade Town
  - Langford
  - Letchworth
  - Milton Keynes
- Four clubs relegated from Premier Division South:
  - Amersham Town
  - Cockfosters
  - Hanwell Town
  - Harefield United
- Two clubs promoted from Division One North:
  - Greenacres
  - Luton Old Boys

At the end of the season Milton Keynes were renamed Bletchley Town.

=== League table ===
Pos	Team	Pld	W	D	L	GF	GA	GD	Pts	Promotion or relegation
1	Holmer Green	42	30	6	6	121	42	+79	96	Promoted to the Premier Division
2	Hanwell Town	42	30	6	6	105	44	+61	96	Promoted to the Premier Division
3	Tring Athletic	42	28	8	6	109	35	+74	92	
4	Milton Keynes	42	28	6	8	104	47	+57	90	
5	Biggleswade Town	42	25	6	11	99	62	+37	81	Promoted to the Premier Division
6	Bedford United	42	23	8	11	65	52	+13	77	
7	Letchworth	42	18	13	11	83	54	+29	67	
8	Biggleswade United	42	19	7	16	86	66	+20	64	
9	Leverstock Green	42	17	13	12	73	63	+10	64	
10	Cockfosters	42	17	11	14	76	62	+14	62	
11	Greenacres	42	19	4	19	71	61	+10	61	
12	Langford	42	18	7	17	71	80	−9	61	
13	Shillington	42	16	9	17	72	73	−1	57	
14	Amersham Town	42	14	10	18	71	82	−11	52	
15	Caddington	42	14	10	18	75	93	−18	52	
16	Totternhoe	42	12	10	20	56	71	−15	46	
17	Luton Old Boys	42	10	9	23	39	78	−39	39	
18	Stony Stratford Town	42	8	11	23	58	98	−40	35	
19	Risborough Rangers	42	8	6	28	41	97	−56	30	
20	Harefield United	42	8	5	29	48	112	−64	29	
21	Winslow United	42	7	5	30	42	104	−62	26	Relegated to Division One
22	Houghton Town	42	6	4	32	43	132	−89	22	Resigned from the league

Source: fchd
Rules for classification: 1) points; 2) goal difference; 3) number of goals scored.

== Division One ==
Spartan South Midlands Football League Division One
- Season: 1998–99
- Champions: Bridger Packaging
- Promoted: Bridger Packaging; Ampthill Town
- Matches: 272
- Goals: 1,079 (3.97 per match)

Division One featured eleven clubs which competed in previous season Division One North, along with six new clubs.

- Three clubs relegated from the Senior Division:
  - Ampthill Town
  - Kent Athletic
  - The 61 FC Luton
- Three new clubs:
  - Dunstable Town
  - Markyate
  - Newport Athletic

=== League table ===
Pos	Team	Pld	W	D	L	GF	GA	GD	Pts	Promotion
1	Bridger Packaging	32	27	3	2	92	21	+71	84	Promoted to the Senior Division
2	Ampthill Town	32	26	3	3	106	33	+73	81	Promoted to the Senior Division
3	De Havilland	32	26	2	4	102	23	+79	80	
4	Mursley United	32	21	5	6	72	26	+46	68	
5	Dunstable Town	32	19	6	7	72	42	+30	63	
6	Scot	32	16	3	13	60	58	+2	51	
7	Pitstone & Ivinghoe	32	14	4	14	80	65	+15	46	
8	Walden Rangers	32	14	4	14	61	47	+14	46	Resigned from the league
9	Old Dunstablians	32	14	4	14	65	59	+6	46	
10	Kent Athletic	32	12	8	12	58	44	+14	44	
11	The 61 FC Luton	32	10	7	15	57	87	−30	37	
12	Flamstead	32	10	4	18	63	84	−21	33 (Note: Flamstead deducted one point.)	
13	Leighton Athletic	32	7	6	19	39	76	−37	27	
14	Old Bradwell United	32	9	3	20	49	96	−47	27 (Note: Old Bradwell United deducted three points.)	
15	Abbey National	32	4	8	20	41	75	−34	20	
16	Newport Athletic	32	4	2	26	37	123	−86	14	
17	Markyate	32	2	2	28	25	120	−95	8	

Source: fchd
Rules for classification: 1) points; 2) goal difference; 3) number of goals scored.
