= 1996–97 South Midlands League =

The 1996–97 South Midlands League season was 68th and the last in the history of South Midlands League.

At the end of the season the league was merged with Spartan League to form Spartan South Midlands Football League. For the first season of the new league clubs from the South Midlands League and the Spartan League were separated: all the South Midlands League Premier Division clubs formed Spartan South Midlands League Premier Division North, while clubs from South Midlands League Senior Division formed Spartan South Midlands League Senior Division and clubs from South Midlands League Division One formed Spartan South Midlands League Division One North. Following first season of the new league regional Premier divisions and divisions One were merged.

== Premier Division ==
South Midlands League Premier Division
- Season: 1996–97
- Champions: Potters Bar Town
- Promoted: None
- Relegated: None

The Premier Division featured 14 clubs which competed in the division last season, along with one new club, promoted from the Senior Division:

- Bedford United

=== League table ===
Pos	Team	Pld	W	D	L	GF	GA	GD	Pts	Qualification
1	Potters Bar Town (C)	28	18	8	2	53	18	+35	62	Joined SSML Premier Division North
2	Brache Sparta	28	19	5	4	54	20	+34	62	Joined SSML Premier Division North
3	Arlesey Town	28	16	7	5	49	20	+29	55	Joined SSML Premier Division North
4	Toddington Rovers	28	14	4	10	45	29	+16	46	Joined SSML Premier Division North
5	Buckingham Athletic	28	14	3	11	52	34	+18	45	Joined SSML Premier Division North
6	Royston Town	28	13	6	9	47	42	+5	45	Joined SSML Premier Division North
7	London Colney	28	12	8	8	47	41	+6	44	Joined SSML Premier Division North
8	Bedford United	28	10	8	10	44	49	−5	38	Joined SSML Premier Division North
9	Welwyn Garden City	28	9	9	10	45	44	+1	36	Joined SSML Premier Division North
10	Harpenden Town	28	9	7	12	32	33	−1	34	Joined SSML Premier Division North
11	Milton Keynes	28	7	10	11	25	36	−11	31	Joined SSML Premier Division North
12	Letchworth	28	7	7	14	35	50	−15	28	Joined SSML Premier Division North
13	Langford	28	6	6	16	22	56	−34	24	Joined SSML Premier Division North
14	Hoddesdon Town	28	5	7	16	30	55	−25	22	Joined SSML Premier Division North
15	Biggleswade Town	28	2	3	23	21	74	−53	9	Joined SSML Premier Division North

Source: fchd
Rules for classification: 1) points; 2) goal difference; 3) number of goals scored.
(C) Champions

== Senior Division ==
South Midlands League Senior Division
- Season: 1996–97
- Champions: Leverstock Green
- Promoted: None
- Relegated: None

The Senior Division featured 13 clubs which competed in the division last season, along with one new club, promoted from Division One:

- Mercedes Benz

Also, ACD changed name to A C D Tridon.

=== League table ===
Pos	Team	Pld	W	D	L	GF	GA	GD	Pts	Qualification
1	Leverstock Green (C)	26	19	3	4	54	19	+35	60	Joined SSML Senior Division
2	Holmer Green	26	18	1	7	71	21	+50	55	Joined SSML Senior Division
3	Tring Athletic	26	17	3	6	62	29	+33	54	Joined SSML Senior Division
4	Stony Stratford Town	26	16	2	8	60	46	+14	50	Joined SSML Senior Division
5	New Bradwell St Peter	26	13	7	6	49	30	+19	46	Joined SSML Senior Division
6	Houghton Town	26	10	8	8	31	32	−1	38	Joined SSML Senior Division
7	Mercedes Benz	26	10	7	9	48	38	+10	37	Joined SSML Senior Division
8	Risborough Rangers	26	11	4	11	35	50	−15	37	Joined SSML Senior Division
9	Winslow United	26	10	5	11	40	51	−11	35	Joined SSML Senior Division
10	Kent Athletic	26	9	5	12	46	57	−11	32	Joined SSML Senior Division
11	Ampthill Town	26	6	5	15	33	57	−24	23	Joined SSML Senior Division
12	A C D Tridon	26	5	6	15	33	56	−23	21	Did not join Spartan South Midlands League
13	Totternhoe	26	2	9	15	27	62	−35	15	Joined SSML Senior Division
14	The 61 FC Luton	26	2	3	21	26	67	−41	9	Joined SSML Senior Division

Source: fchd
Rules for classification: 1) points; 2) goal difference; 3) number of goals scored.
(C) Champions

== Division One ==
South Midlands League Division One
- Season: 1996–97
- Champions: Biggleswade United
- Promoted: Biggleswade United; Caddington
- Relegated: None

Division One featured 14 clubs which competed in the division last season, along with four new clubs:

- Bedford Eagles
- Biggleswade United
- Luton Old Boys
- Mursley United

=== League table ===
Pos	Team	Pld	W	D	L	GF	GA	GD	Pts	Promotion
1	Biggleswade United (C, P)	34	26	4	4	116	35	+81	82	Promoted to the SSML Senior Division
2	Caddington (P)	34	22	7	5	89	45	+44	72 (Note: Deducted 1 point)	Promoted to the SSML Senior Division
3	De Havilland	34	22	5	7	88	52	+36	71	Joined SSML Division One North
4	Crawley Green Sports	34	19	7	8	77	51	+26	64	Joined SSML Division One North
5	Old Bradwell United	34	19	6	9	69	49	+20	63	Joined SSML Division One North
6	Emberton	34	19	5	10	67	46	+21	62	Joined SSML Division One North
7	Bedford Eagles	34	18	6	10	79	48	+31	57 (Note: Deducted 3 points)	Joined SSML Division One North
8	Scot	34	16	4	14	49	57	−8	52	Joined SSML Division One North
9	Walden Rangers	34	14	6	14	70	46	+24	48	Joined SSML Division One North
10	Buckingham United	34	13	6	15	66	75	−9	45	Joined SSML Division One North
11	Bridger Packaging	34	13	4	17	61	74	−13	43	Joined SSML Division One North
12	Luton Old Boys	34	10	7	17	43	53	−10	37	Joined SSML Division One North
13	Old Dunstablians	34	10	6	18	62	85	−23	36	Joined SSML Division One North
14	Leighton Athletic	34	9	5	20	50	75	−25	32	Joined SSML Division One North
15	Flamstead	34	8	6	20	44	80	−36	30	Joined SSML Division One North
16	Abbey National	34	5	9	20	39	92	−53	24	Joined SSML Division One North
17	Mursley United	34	6	8	20	53	91	−38	23	Joined SSML Division One North
18	Pitstone & Ivinghoe	34	5	3	26	26	94	−68	18	Joined SSML Division One North

Source: fchd
Rules for classification: 1) points; 2) goal difference; 3) number of goals scored.
(C) Champions; (P) Promoted
