= 2000–01 Spartan South Midlands Football League =

The 2000–01 Spartan South Midlands Football League season is the 4th in the history of Spartan South Midlands Football League a football competition in England.

At the end of the season the Senior Division was renamed Division One, while Division One was renamed Division Two.

== Premier Division ==
Spartan South Midlands Football League Premier Division
- Season: 2000–01
- Champions: Beaconsfield SYCOB
- Relegated: Welwyn Garden City
- Matches: 342
- Goals: 1,164 (3.4 per match)

The Premier Division featured 19 clubs which competed in the division last season, along with one new club:

- Bedford United, promoted from the Senior Division

=== League table ===
Pos	Team	Pld	W	D	L	GF	GA	GD	Pts	Relegation
1	Beaconsfield SYCOB	36	28	4	4	80	36	+44	88	
2	London Colney	36	25	6	5	91	36	+55	81	
3	Potters Bar Town	36	25	6	5	82	39	+43	78 (Note: Potters Bar Town were deducted three points.)	
4	Brook House	36	22	6	8	64	36	+28	72	
5	Somersett Ambury V&E	36	17	9	10	67	47	+20	60	
6	Holmer Green	36	18	2	16	58	58	0	56	
7	Hanwell Town	36	16	6	14	67	52	+15	54	
8	Hillingdon Borough	36	14	12	10	63	61	+2	54	
9	Brache Sparta	36	14	7	15	70	78	−8	49	
10	New Bradwell St Peter	36	11	12	13	49	52	−3	45	
11	Hoddesdon Town	36	13	5	18	54	60	−6	44	
12	Bedford United	36	11	10	15	49	50	−1	43	
13	St Margaretsbury	36	9	8	19	45	68	−23	38 (Note: St Margaretsbury were awarded three points.)	
14	Biggleswade Town	36	9	9	18	40	55	−15	36	
15	Ruislip Manor	36	10	6	20	44	60	−16	36	
16	Milton Keynes City	36	9	7	20	50	79	−29	34	
17	Royston Town	36	8	9	19	31	60	−29	33	
18	Haringey Borough	36	6	11	19	33	78	−45	29	
19	Welwyn Garden City	36	6	7	23	25	57	−32	25	Relegated to new Division One
20	Waltham Abbey	0	0	0	0	0	0	0	0	Club folded, record expunged

Source: fchd
Rules for classification: 1) points; 2) goal difference; 3) number of goals scored.

== Senior Division ==
Spartan South Midlands Football League Senior Division
- Season: 2000–01
- Champions: Letchworth
- Promoted: Dunstable Town; Letchworth
- Relegated: Luton Old Boys; Totternhoe
- Matches: 342
- Goals: 1,326 (3.88 per match)

The Senior Division featured 16 clubs which competed in the division last season, along with four new clubs:

- Colney Heath, joined from the Herts County League
- De Havilland, promoted from Division One
- Dunstable Town, promoted from Division One
- Harpenden Town, relegated from the Premier Division

Also, Bridger Packaging changed name to Letchworth Bridger.

At the end of the season the Senior Division was renamed Division One, while Division One was renamed Division Two.

=== League table ===
Pos	Team	Pld	W	D	L	GF	GA	GD	Pts	Promotion or relegation
1	Letchworth	36	28	5	3	94	32	+62	89	Promoted to the Premier Division
2	Dunstable Town	36	27	6	3	94	25	+69	87	Promoted to the Premier Division
3	Biggleswade United	36	21	6	9	82	46	+36	69	
4	Tring Athletic	36	19	10	7	74	27	+47	67	
5	Colney Heath	36	19	7	10	86	44	+42	64	
6	Cockfosters	36	18	8	10	67	62	+5	62	
7	Langford	36	17	7	12	72	57	+15	58	
8	Ampthill Town	36	17	5	14	76	54	+22	56	
9	Stony Stratford Town	36	14	8	14	65	68	−3	50	
10	Leverstock Green	36	14	4	18	38	57	−19	46	
11	Risborough Rangers	36	12	6	18	57	73	−16	42	
12	Letchworth Bridger	36	11	6	19	59	82	−23	39	
13	Greenacres	36	10	12	14	46	66	−20	41 (Note: Greenacres were deducted one point.)	
14	Brimsdown Rovers	36	12	4	20	53	64	−11	40	
15	Harefield United	36	10	9	17	53	59	−6	39	
16	Amersham Town	36	10	8	18	34	55	−21	38	
17	Harpenden Town	36	7	10	19	51	76	−25	31	
18	Luton Old Boys	36	6	8	22	38	77	−39	26	Relegated to Division Two
19	Totternhoe	36	3	5	28	25	140	−115	14	Relegated to Division Two
20	De Havilland	0	0	0	0	0	0	0	0	Club folded, record expunged

Source: fchd
Rules for classification: 1) points; 2) goal difference; 3) number of goals scored.

== Division One ==
Spartan South Midlands Football League Division One
- Season: 2000–01
- Champions: Pitstone & Ivinghoe
- Promoted: Pitstone & Ivinghoe; The 61 FC Luton; Winslow United
- Matches: 306
- Goals: 1,210 (3.95 per match)

Division One featured 14 clubs which competed in the division last season, along with four new clubs.

- Two clubs relegated from the Senior Division:
  - Caddington
  - Shillington
- Two new clubs:
  - Haywood United
  - Milcutt Rovers

Also, Newport Athletic changed name to North Crawley United.

At the end of the season Division One was renamed Division Two, while the Senior Division was renamed Division One.

=== League table ===
Pos	Team	Pld	W	D	L	GF	GA	GD	Pts	Promotion
1	Pitstone & Ivinghoe	34	26	4	4	91	34	+57	82	Promoted to new Division One
2	Flamstead	34	22	5	7	96	46	+50	71	
3	The 61 FC Luton	34	19	8	7	79	54	+25	65	Promoted to new Division One
4	Winslow United	34	20	7	7	81	41	+40	64 (Note: Winslow United were deducted three points.)	Promoted to new Division One
5	Kent Athletic	34	18	9	7	83	54	+29	63	
6	Old Dunstablians	34	17	7	10	88	58	+30	58	
7	Mursley United	34	16	8	10	93	46	+47	56	
8	Scot	34	15	7	12	98	76	+22	52	
9	Haywood United	34	13	8	13	75	50	+25	47	
10	Buckingham Athletic	34	11	11	12	61	58	+3	44	
11	Milcutt Rovers	34	12	8	14	62	73	−11	44	
12	Crawley Green	34	12	7	15	58	48	+10	43	
13	Abbey National	34	12	4	18	54	58	−4	43 (Note: Abbey National were awarded three points.)	
14	Shillington	34	11	4	19	54	74	−20	37	
15	Caddington	34	10	5	19	44	90	−46	35	
16	Markyate	34	6	8	20	36	78	−42	26	Resigned from the league
17	Old Bradwell United	34	6	6	22	37	95	−58	24	
18	North Crawley United	34	2	0	32	21	178	−157	6	

Source: fchd
Rules for classification: 1) points; 2) goal difference; 3) number of goals scored.
