= 1999–2000 Spartan South Midlands Football League =

The 1999–2000 Spartan South Midlands Football League season is the 3rd in the history of Spartan South Midlands Football League a football competition in England.

== Premier Division ==
Spartan South Midlands Football League Premier Division
- Season: 1999–2000
- Champions: Arlesey Town
- Promoted: Arlesey Town
- Relegated: Harpenden Town
- Matches: 420
- Goals: 1,481 (3.53 per match)

The Premier Division featured 18 clubs which competed in the division last season, along with three new clubs, promoted from the Senior Division:

- Biggleswade Town
- Hanwell Town
- Holmer Green

=== League table ===
Pos	Team	Pld	W	D	L	GF	GA	GD	Pts	Promotion or relegation
1	Arlesey Town	40	30	3	7	98	45	+53	93	Promoted to Isthmian League Division Three
2	Brook House	40	27	6	7	102	33	+69	89 (Note: Brook House awarded two points.)	
3	Beaconsfield SYCOB	40	26	4	10	87	42	+45	81 (Note: Beaconsfield SYCOB deducted one point.)	
4	Potters Bar Town	40	26	2	12	105	66	+39	80	
5	London Colney	40	22	12	6	87	38	+49	78	
6	Waltham Abbey	40	23	4	13	78	64	+14	73	
7	Brache Sparta	40	19	13	8	85	48	+37	70	
8	Hoddesdon Town	40	21	7	12	85	55	+30	70	
9	Milton Keynes City	40	21	5	14	80	53	+27	68	
10	Hanwell Town	40	20	6	14	73	52	+21	66	
11	Royston Town	40	15	8	17	53	54	−1	53	
12	Ruislip Manor	40	16	4	20	61	81	−20	52	
13	New Bradwell St Peter	40	12	13	15	65	75	−10	49	
14	Hillingdon Borough	40	14	6	20	56	63	−7	48	
15	Holmer Green	40	12	10	18	56	92	−36	46	
16	St Margaretsbury	40	10	9	21	67	93	−26	39	
17	Biggleswade Town	40	9	7	24	49	73	−24	34	
18	Haringey Borough	40	10	2	28	56	99	−43	32	
19	Welwyn Garden City	40	6	11	23	49	98	−49	29	
20	Somersett Ambury V&E	40	7	5	28	48	102	−54	26	
21	Harpenden Town	40	4	3	33	41	155	−114	15	Relegated to Senior Division

Source: fchd
Rules for classification: 1) points; 2) goal difference; 3) number of goals scored.

== Senior Division ==
Spartan South Midlands Football League Senior Division
- Season: 1999–2000
- Champions: Tring Athletic
- Promoted: Bedford United
- Relegated: Caddington; Shillington
- Matches: 342
- Goals: 1,227 (3.59 per match)

The Senior Division featured 17 clubs which competed in the division last season, along with three new clubs:

- Ampthill Town, promoted from Division One
- Bridger Packaging, promoted from Division One
- Brimsdown Rovers, relegated from the Premier Division

Also, Milton Keynes changed name to Bletchley Town.

=== League table ===
Pos	Team	Pld	W	D	L	GF	GA	GD	Pts	Promotion or relegation
1	Tring Athletic	36	27	5	4	103	29	+74	86	
2	Ampthill Town	36	23	6	7	86	46	+40	75	
3	Bedford United	36	22	5	9	106	48	+58	71	Promoted to the Premier Division
4	Biggleswade United	36	18	10	8	71	55	+16	64	
5	Letchworth	36	17	10	9	74	57	+17	61	
6	Cockfosters	36	17	9	10	79	55	+24	60	
7	Bridger Packaging	36	19	3	14	74	63	+11	60	
8	Brimsdown Rovers	36	17	5	14	74	52	+22	58 (Note: Brimsdown Rovers awarded two points.)	
9	Amersham Town	36	15	11	10	63	48	+15	56	
10	Totternhoe	36	15	11	10	56	46	+10	56	
11	Langford	36	14	9	13	59	60	−1	51	
12	Leverstock Green	36	12	10	14	61	59	+2	46	
13	Greenacres	36	11	9	16	56	66	−10	42	
14	Stony Stratford Town	36	11	6	19	60	86	−26	39	
15	Harefield United	36	8	13	15	40	49	−9	36 (Note: Harefield United deducted one point.)	
16	Risborough Rangers	36	6	7	23	44	73	−29	25	
17	Caddington	36	6	6	24	40	127	−87	24	Relegated to Division One
18	Luton Old Boys	36	5	7	24	35	89	−54	22	
19	Shillington	36	6	4	26	46	119	−73	22	Relegated to Division One
20	Bletchley Town	0	0	0	0	0	0	0	0	Club folded, record expunged

Source: fchd
Rules for classification: 1) points; 2) goal difference; 3) number of goals scored.

== Division One ==
Spartan South Midlands Football League Division One
- Season: 1999–2000
- Champions: Dunstable Town
- Promoted: Dunstable Town; De Havilland
- Matches: 272
- Goals: 1,075 (3.95 per match)

The Division One featured 14 clubs which competed in the division last season, along with three new clubs:

- Buckingham Athletic, demoted from the Premier Division
- Crawley Green, new club
- Winslow United, relegated from the Senior Division

=== League table ===
Pos	Team	Pld	W	D	L	GF	GA	GD	Pts	Promotion
1	Dunstable Town	32	26	6	0	115	17	+98	84	Promoted to the Senior Division
2	De Havilland	32	24	4	4	113	31	+82	76	Promoted to the Senior Division
3	Pitstone & Ivinghoe	32	22	7	3	97	28	+69	73	
4	Winslow United	32	21	5	6	84	34	+50	68	
5	Scot	32	19	1	12	92	64	+28	55 (Note: Scot deducted three points.)	
6	Mursley United	32	16	6	10	62	42	+20	54	
7	Old Dunstablians	32	15	3	14	51	53	−2	48	
8	Crawley Green	32	14	5	13	67	47	+20	47	
9	Kent Athletic	32	14	1	17	55	60	−5	43	
10	Buckingham Athletic	32	12	5	15	50	55	−5	41	
11	Flamstead	32	12	5	15	53	59	−6	41	
12	Abbey National	32	10	6	16	46	75	−29	36	
13	The 61 FC Luton	32	9	7	16	52	72	−20	34	
14	Newport Athletic	32	8	5	19	49	91	−42	29	
15	Leighton Athletic	32	6	7	19	45	98	−53	25	Resigned from the league
16	Old Bradwell United	32	3	4	25	26	101	−75	16 (Note: Old Bradwell United awarded three points.)	
17	Markyate	32	1	3	28	18	148	−130	6	

Source: fchd
Rules for classification: 1) points; 2) goal difference; 3) number of goals scored.
