= 1994–95 South Midlands League =

The 1994–95 South Midlands League season was 66th in the history of South Midlands League.

== Premier Division ==
South Midlands League Premier Division
- Season: 1994–95
- Champions: Arlesey Town
- Promoted: Wingate & Finchley
- Relegated: None

The Premier Division featured 14 clubs which competed in the division last season, along with 2 new clubs:

- Royston Town, resigned from Isthmian League Division Three
- Dunstable United

=== League table ===
Pos	Team	Pld	W	D	L	GF	GA	GD	Pts	Qualification
1	Arlesey Town (C)	45	34	5	6	90	32	+58	107	
2	Wingate & Finchley (P)	45	25	13	7	97	49	+48	88	Promotion to Isthmian League Division Three
3	Brache Sparta	45	23	15	7	85	61	+24	84	
4	Royston Town	45	24	11	10	77	42	+35	83	
5	Shillington	45	22	11	12	64	38	+26	77	
6	Potters Bar Town	45	19	7	19	75	70	+5	64	
7	Biggleswade Town	45	17	10	18	65	71	−6	61	
8	Langford	45	15	15	15	63	66	−3	60	
9	Milton Keynes	45	15	14	16	71	77	−6	59	
10	Hoddesdon Town	45	15	11	19	56	57	−1	56	
11	Hatfield Town	45	14	12	19	66	80	−14	54	
12	Welwyn Garden City	45	11	13	21	53	72	−19	46	
13	Buckingham Athletic	45	10	13	22	51	88	−37	43	
14	Dunstable United	45	11	10	24	39	77	−38	43	
15	Harpenden Town	45	9	12	24	60	72	−12	39	
16	Letchworth Garden City	45	5	10	30	58	118	−60	25	

Source: nonleaguematters
Rules for classification: 1) points; 2) goal difference; 3) number of goals scored.
(C) Champions; (P) Promoted

== Senior Division ==
South Midlands League Senior Division
- Season: 1994–95
- Champions: London Colney
- Promoted: London Colney; Toddington Rovers
- Relegated: Pitstone & Ivinghoe

The Senior Division featured 12 clubs which competed in the division last season, along with 2 new clubs, promoted from last season's Division One:

- Stony Stratford Town
- Delco

Also Delco changed their name to ACD Tridon.

=== League table ===
Pos	Team	Pld	W	D	L	GF	GA	GD	Pts	Qualification
1	London Colney (C, P)	26	22	2	2	87	20	+67	68	Promotion to Premier Division
2	Toddington Rovers (P)	26	16	4	6	80	30	+50	52	Promotion to Premier Division
3	New Bradwell St. Peter	26	15	6	5	90	32	+58	51	
4	Leverstock Green	26	14	8	4	50	21	+29	50	
5	Stony Stratford Town	26	16	1	9	60	37	+23	49	
6	ACD Tridon	26	14	3	9	56	39	+17	45	
7	Tring Athletic	26	10	6	10	44	38	+6	36	
8	Bedford United	26	9	7	10	30	47	−17	34	
9	Ampthill Town	26	7	7	12	57	66	−9	28	
10	Winslow United	26	7	6	13	45	65	−20	27	
11	Totternhoe	26	8	2	16	40	64	−24	26	
12	Risborough Rangers	26	6	6	14	47	68	−21	24	
13	The 61 FC Luton	26	6	4	16	33	69	−36	22	
14	Pitstone & Ivinghoe (R)	26	0	2	24	22	145	−123	2	Relegation to Division One

Source: nonleaguematters
Rules for classification: 1) points; 2) goal difference; 3) number of goals scored.
(C) Champions; (P) Promoted; (R) Relegated

== Division One ==
South Midlands League Division One
- Season: 1994–95
- Champions: Houghton Town
- Promoted: Houghton Town; Kent Athletic
- Relegated: None

The Division One featured 10 clubs which competed in the division last season, along with 4 new clubs:

- Kent Athletic
- Bow Brickhill
- Abbey National
- Clifton Old Boys

=== League table ===
Pos	Team	Pld	W	D	L	GF	GA	GD	Pts	Qualification
1	Houghton Town (C, P)	26	20	3	3	82	17	+65	63	Promotion to Senior Division
2	Kent Athletic (P)	26	16	7	3	68	31	+37	55	Promotion to Senior Division
3	Walden Rangers	26	17	4	5	57	37	+20	55	
4	Eaton Bray	26	15	3	8	47	26	+21	48	Left the league
5	De Havilland	26	10	10	6	44	30	+14	40	
6	Bow Brickhill	26	10	7	9	47	44	+3	37	
7	Scot	26	9	6	11	42	52	−10	33	
8	Flamstead	26	10	2	14	28	47	−19	32	
9	Cranfield United	26	9	5	12	42	64	−22	32	
10	Caddington	26	8	7	11	50	45	+5	31	
11	Abbey National	26	6	5	15	32	65	−33	23	
12	Mercedes Benz	26	4	10	12	27	46	−19	22	
13	Emberton	26	5	7	14	31	52	−21	21 (Note: Emberton deducted 1 point.)	
14	Clifton Old Boys	26	2	6	18	20	61	−41	12	Left the league

Source: nonleaguematters
Rules for classification: 1) points; 2) goal difference; 3) number of goals scored.
(C) Champions; (P) Promoted
