= 2001–02 Spartan South Midlands Football League =

The 2001–02 Spartan South Midlands Football League season is the 5th in the history of Spartan South Midlands Football League a football competition in England.

At the end of the previous season the Senior Division was renamed Division One, while Division One was renamed Division Two.

== Premier Division ==
Spartan South Midlands Football League Premier Division
- Season: 2001–02
- Champions: London Colney
- Relegated: Brache Sparta; New Bradwell St Peter
- Matches: 380
- Goals: 1,417 (3.73 per match)

The Premier Division featured 18 clubs which competed in the division last season, along with two clubs, promoted from the Senior Division:

- Dunstable Town
- Letchworth

=== League table ===
Pos	Team	Pld	W	D	L	GF	GA	GD	Pts	Promotion or relegation
1	London Colney	38	28	8	2	119	32	+87	92	
2	Letchworth	38	25	7	6	105	45	+60	82	
3	Hanwell Town	38	25	6	7	114	64	+50	81	
4	Milton Keynes City	38	22	9	7	76	39	+37	75	
5	St Margaretsbury	38	20	8	10	74	55	+19	68	
6	Brook House	38	19	7	12	89	63	+26	64	
7	Dunstable Town	38	18	8	12	74	54	+20	62	
8	Royston Town	38	15	13	10	82	58	+24	58	
9	Biggleswade Town	38	16	9	13	74	64	+10	57	
10	Beaconsfield SYCOB	38	15	10	13	84	52	+32	55	
11	Somersett Ambury V&E	38	16	5	17	75	61	+14	53	
12	Haringey Borough	38	13	9	16	53	74	−21	48	
13	Potters Bar Town	38	14	5	19	71	77	−6	47	
14	Hoddesdon Town	38	12	8	18	50	56	−6	44	
15	Holmer Green	38	12	6	20	59	98	−39	42	
16	Hillingdon Borough	38	11	6	21	63	76	−13	39	
17	Ruislip Manor	38	9	6	23	47	82	−35	33	
18	Bedford United	38	8	7	23	38	114	−76	31	
19	Brache Sparta	38	7	4	27	45	109	−64	25	Relegated to Division One
20	New Bradwell St Peter	38	3	3	32	25	144	−119	12	Relegated to Division One

Source: fchd
Rules for classification: 1) points; 2) goal difference; 3) number of goals scored.

== Division One ==
Spartan South Midlands Football League Division One
- Season: 2001–02
- Champions: Greenacres
- Promoted: Greenacres; Harefield United
- Relegated: Winslow United; Amersham Town
- Matches: 380
- Goals: 1,326 (3.49 per match)

The previous season Senior Division and Division One changed names to Division One and Division Two accordingly. Division One featured 15 clubs which competed in the Senior Division last season, along with five new clubs:

- Kings Langley, joined from the Herts County League
- Pitstone & Ivinghoe United, promoted from old Division One
- The 61, promoted from old Division One
- Welwyn Garden City, relegated from the Premier Division
- Winslow United, promoted from old Division One

=== League table ===
Pos	Team	Pld	W	D	L	GF	GA	GD	Pts	Promotion or relegation
1	Greenacres	38	24	10	4	101	40	+61	82	Promoted to the Premier Division
2	Harefield United	38	25	6	7	85	36	+49	81	Promoted to the Premier Division
3	Colney Heath	38	21	10	7	86	47	+39	73	
4	Biggleswade United	38	21	8	9	89	45	+44	71	
5	Tring Athletic	38	19	12	7	63	38	+25	69	
6	Langford	38	19	6	13	65	46	+19	63	
7	Pitstone & Ivinghoe United	38	16	9	13	70	65	+5	57	
8	Leverstock Green	38	15	10	13	86	58	+28	55	
9	Stony Stratford Town	38	15	8	15	78	70	+8	53	
10	The 61	38	14	10	14	59	65	−6	52	
11	Risborough Rangers	38	14	9	15	70	62	+8	51	
12	Kings Langley	38	14	8	16	58	69	−11	50	
13	Cockfosters	38	13	9	16	67	71	−4	48	
14	Ampthill Town	38	12	10	16	58	91	−33	46	
15	Harpenden Town	38	12	9	17	72	83	−11	45	
16	Welwyn Garden City	38	9	11	18	33	54	−21	38	
17	Brimsdown Rovers	38	9	10	19	55	79	−24	37	
18	Letchworth Bridger	38	8	9	21	55	103	−48	33	Resigned from the league
19	Winslow United	38	7	3	28	30	86	−56	24	Relegated to Division Two
20	Amersham Town	38	4	11	23	46	118	−72	23	Relegated to Division Two

Source: fchd
Rules for classification: 1) points; 2) goal difference; 3) number of goals scored.

== Division Two ==
Spartan South Midlands Football League Division Two
- Season: 2001–02
- Champions: Mursley United
- Promoted: Haywood United; Shillington
- Matches: 240
- Goals: 1,074 (4.48 per match)

The previous season Division One changed name to Division Two before this season. Division Two featured 14 clubs which competed in the Division One last season, along with four new clubs.

- Two clubs relegated from the Senior Division:
  - Luton Old Boys
  - Totternhoe
- Two new clubs:
  - Cranfield United
  - Padbury United

=== League table ===
Pos	Team	Pld	W	D	L	GF	GA	GD	Pts	Promotion
1	Mursley United	30	21	6	3	111	35	+76	69	
2	Haywood United	30	21	5	4	117	47	+70	68	Promoted to Division One
3	Shillington	30	20	3	7	83	34	+49	63	Promoted to Division One
4	Old Dunstablians	30	20	2	8	100	39	+61	62	
5	Padbury United	30	18	6	6	76	42	+34	60	
6	Crawley Green	30	16	6	8	76	51	+25	54	
7	Cranfield United	30	14	5	11	55	51	+4	47	
8	Abbey National	30	13	7	10	55	53	+2	46	
9	Buckingham Athletic	30	11	3	16	60	57	+3	36	
10	Caddington	30	10	4	16	58	64	−6	34	
11	Kent Athletic	30	9	7	14	53	61	−8	34	
12	Milcutt Rovers	30	11	2	17	57	77	−20	32 (Note: Milcutt Rovers deducted 3 points)	Resigned from the league
13	Old Bradwell United	30	8	6	16	53	69	−16	30	
14	Flamstead	30	8	3	19	51	94	−43	27	
15	Totternhoe	30	5	3	22	47	105	−58	18	
16	Scot	30	1	0	29	23	196	−173	3	
17	Luton Old Boys	0	0	0	0	0	0	0	0	Clubs folded, records expunged
18	North Crawley United	0	0	0	0	0	0	0	0	Clubs folded, records expunged

Source: fchd
Rules for classification: 1) points; 2) goal difference; 3) number of goals scored.
