= 1991–92 South Midlands League =

The 1991–92 South Midlands League season was 63rd in the history of South Midlands League.

== Premier Division ==
South Midlands League Premier Division
- Season: 1991–92
- Champions: Leighton Town
- Promoted: Leighton Town
- Relegated: Winslow United

The Premier Division featured 18 clubs which competed in the division last season, along with 4 new clubs:

- Buckingham Athletic, promoted from Division One
- Oxford City, promoted from Division One
- Leverstock Green, joined from Herts Senior County League Premier Division
- Potters Bar Town, joined from Herts Senior County League Premier Division

=== League table ===
Pos	Team	Pld	W	D	L	GF	GA	GD	Pts	Qualification
1	Leighton Town (C, P)	40	29	8	3	98	30	+68	95	Promotion to Isthmian League Division Three
2	Milton Keynes Borough	40	30	3	7	116	29	+87	93	
3	Biggleswade Town	40	26	6	8	96	38	+58	84	
4	Shillington	40	25	6	9	82	35	+47	81	
5	Wingate & Finchley	40	22	10	8	87	51	+36	76	
6	Hoddesdon Town	40	20	13	7	80	42	+38	73	
7	Brache Sparta	40	21	8	11	82	48	+34	71	
8	Leverstock Green	40	21	6	13	63	38	+25	69	
9	Oxford City	40	19	7	14	74	50	+24	64	
10	Langford	40	18	8	14	52	48	+4	62	
11	Potters Bar Town	40	17	10	13	76	64	+12	61	
12	Harpenden Town	40	14	11	15	70	63	+7	53	
13	Totternhoe	40	15	4	21	62	84	−22	49	
14	Letchworth Garden City	40	13	6	21	58	63	−5	45	
15	Pitstone & Ivinghoe	40	12	8	20	63	101	−38	44	
16	Pirton	40	10	11	19	36	61	−25	41	
17	Welwyn Garden City	40	10	10	20	62	87	−25	40	
18	Buckingham Athletic	40	10	6	24	60	77	−17	36	
19	New Bradwell St. Peter	40	5	8	27	34	93	−59	23	
20	The 61 FC Luton	40	4	5	31	39	114	−75	17	
21	Winslow United (R)	40	2	0	38	20	194	−174	6	Relegation to Division One
22	Wolverton	0	0	0	0	0	0	0	0	Club folded

Source: nonleaguematters
Rules for classification: 1) points; 2) goal difference; 3) number of goals scored.
(C) Champions; (P) Promoted; (R) Relegated

== Division One ==
South Midlands League Division One
- Season: 1991–92
- Champions: Ashcroft
- Promoted: Luton Old Boys
- Relegated: None

The Division One featured 16 clubs which competed in the division last season, along with 4 new clubs:

- Luton Old Boys
- Bedford Town
- Ampthill Town, transferred from the United Counties League Division One
- Emberton

=== League table ===
Pos	Team	Pld	W	D	L	GF	GA	GD	Pts	Qualification
1	Ashcroft (C)	38	30	5	3	93	30	+63	95	
2	Luton Old Boys (P)	38	28	7	3	104	41	+63	91	Promotion to Premier Division
3	Bedford United	38	28	5	5	118	39	+79	89	
4	Bedford Town	38	26	6	6	100	32	+68	84	
5	Shenley & Loughton	38	20	5	13	85	42	+43	65	
6	Toddington Rovers	38	17	13	8	76	53	+23	64	
7	Delco Products	38	17	6	15	69	59	+10	57	
8	Risborough Rangers	38	14	11	13	61	65	−4	53	
9	Ampthill Town	38	14	10	14	65	57	+8	52	
10	Cranfield United	38	13	10	15	62	66	−4	49	
11	Ickleford	38	12	12	14	54	60	−6	48	
12	Tring Athletic	38	12	11	15	57	58	−1	44 (Note: Tring Athletic deducted 3 points.)	
13	Sandy Albion	38	11	8	19	61	87	−26	41	
14	Potters Bar Crusaders	38	12	4	22	86	99	−13	40	
15	Walden Rangers	38	9	13	16	65	82	−17	40	
16	Flamstead	38	11	7	20	60	87	−27	40	
17	Shefford Town	38	11	7	20	41	72	−31	40	
18	Emberton	38	9	6	23	47	91	−44	33	
19	Caddington	38	4	7	27	40	103	−63	19	
20	Stony Stratford Town	38	2	7	29	41	162	−121	13	

Source: nonleaguematters
Rules for classification: 1) points; 2) goal difference; 3) number of goals scored.
(C) Champions; (P) Promoted
