= Zak Guerfi =

Tunisian-English footballer (born 1998)

Personal information
- Full name: Zakary Zidane Guerfi
- Date of birth: 11 October 1998 (age 28)
- Place of birth: London, England
- Position: Midfielder

Team information
- Current team: Welwyn Garden City

Youth career
- 2012–2016: Stevenage

Senior career*
Years	Team	Apps	(Gls)
2016–2017	Stevenage	0	(0)
2016	→ Bedford Town (loan)	1	(0)
2017	Bishop's Stortford	3	(0)
2017	Codicote	1	(0)
2017–2018	Biggleswade United	8	(0)
2018–2019	Bodens BK	34	(2)
2019–2020	US Monastir	0	(0)
2020	Braintree Town	3	(0)
2020	Sevenoaks Town	3	(0)
2020–2021	Tonbridge Angels	6	(0)
2021	Cray Wanderers	1	(0)
2021–2022	Leatherhead	6	(0)
2022	Potters Bar Town	18	(1)
2023–	Welwyn Garden City	0	(0)

International career^{‡}
2016	Tunisia U18	1	(0)
- * Club domestic league appearances and goals as of 18:02, 18 July 2023 (UTC) ‡ National team caps and goals as of 21:34, 19 December 2021 (UTC)

Zakary Zidane Guerfi (Arabic: زاك القرفي; born 11 October 1998) is a semi-professional footballer who last played as a midfielder for Welwyn Garden City. Born in England, he represents Tunisia at international level.

== Club career ==
Guerfi started his career with Stevenage, joining the under-12 side in 2012. He enjoyed a brief loan with Bedford Town in December 2016, before a move to Bishop's Stortford ahead of the 2017–18 campaign. Guerfi went onto feature for the likes of Codicote and Biggleswade United before making the move to Sweden to join fourth-tier side, Bodens BK in 2018. During his debut season in Scandinavia, Guerfi was part of the side which gained promotion to the Swedish third-tier, Division 1. This triumph was rewarded with a move in July 2019 to top-flight side, US Monastir, a team native to Tunisia. However, seven months into his stay at the club and without a single appearance to his name, Guerfi had his contract terminated following disputes concerning his salary between the club and player.

Upon his return to England, Guerfi joined Essex-based side, Braintree Town in February 2020, featuring three times before the COVID-19 pandemic curtailed the remainder of the 2019–20 campaign. Following a short-term spell with Sevenoaks Town in October 2020, Guerfi made the move back to the National League South to join Tonbridge Angels, in which his stay was heavily disrupted once again by the COVID-19 pandemic as he featured eight times in all competitions before leaving for Cray Wanderers and then subsequently Leatherhead in October and November 2021. In February 2022, he was playing for Potters Bar Town. Guerfi went onto feature eighteen times, scoring once for the club before announcing his departure in May 2022.

After a year out of football, Guerfi signed for Welwyn Garden City in July 2023.

== International career ==
Guerfi made his Tunisia under-18 bow in 2016 as a sixteen-year old, featuring against Egypt under-18s. In June 2019, Guerfi was called up to the Tunisia senior squad and was an unused substitute in a 2–0 friendly win over Iraq.

== Personal life ==
He appeared on the 2023 BBC documentary Boot Dreams: Now or Never, about young footballers trying to gain a professional contract.

== Career statistics ==
As of match played 23 April 2022

Appearances and goals by club, season and competition
Club	Season	League			National Cup		League Cup		Other		Total	
Club	Season	Division	Apps	Goals	Apps	Goals	Apps	Goals	Apps	Goals	Apps	Goals
Stevenage	2016–17	League Two	0	0	0	0	0	0	0	0	0	0
Bedford Town (loan)	2016–17	Southern League Division One Central	1	0	—		—		—		1	0
Bishop's Stortford	2017–18	Southern League Premier Division	3	0	0	0	—		0	0	3	0
Codicote	2017–18	Spartan South Midlands League Division One	1	0	—		—		0	0	1	0
Biggleswade United	2017–18	Spartan South Midlands League Premier Division	8	0	—		—		—		8	0
Bodens BK	2018	Division 2 Norrland	20	1	0	0	—		—		20	1
Bodens BK	2019	Division 1 Norra	14	1	0	0	—		—		14	1
Bodens BK	Total		34	2	0	0	—		—		34	2
US Monastir	2019–20	Ligue 1	0	0	0	0	—		—		0	0
Braintree Town	2019–20	National League South	3	0	—		—		—		3	0
Sevenoaks Town	2020–21	Isthmian League South East Division	3	0	—		—		—		3	0
Tonbridge Angels	2020–21	National League South	3	0	—		—		1 (Note: Appearance in the FA Trophy)	0	4	0
Tonbridge Angels	2021–22	National League South	3	0	1	0	—		0	0	4	0
Tonbridge Angels	Total		6	0	1	0	—		1	0	8	0
Cray Wanderers	2021–22	Isthmian League Premier Division	1	0	—		—		0	0	1	0
Leatherhead	2021–22	Isthmian League Premier Division	6	0	—		—		—		6	0
Potters Bar Town	2021–22	Isthmian League Premier Division	18	1	—		—		—		18	1
Career total			84	3	1	0	0	0	1	0	86	3
