= Harefield United F.C. =

Association football club in England

Coordinates: 51°36′04″N 0°28′36″W

Harefield United
- Full name: Harefield United Football Club
- Nickname: The Hares
- Founded: 1868; 158 years ago
- Ground: Preston Park, Harefield
- Capacity: 1,200 (150 seated)
- Chairman: Gary South
- Manager: Richard Pacquette
- League: Combined Counties League Premier Division North
- 2025–26: Combined Counties League Premier Division North, 15th of 20
| Home colours | Away colours |

Harefield United Football Club are an English football club based in Harefield in the London Borough of Hillingdon. The club is the oldest in Middlesex. The club is affiliated to the Middlesex County Football Association. They are currently members of the Combined Counties Premier North Division as of the 2022–2023 season, having left the Spartan South Midlands League Premier Division at the end of the 2021–2022 season.

== History ==
The club was formed in 1868 and in their early years played under several names including Harefield Victoria (circa 1891) and Breakspear Institute (circa 1903–1922), and played in the local Uxbridge Leagues. In 1934 the club merged with Harefield FC to become Harefield United, and played in the Uxbridge & District League.

After the war the club moved to the Great Western Combination in 1947, winning the league once in the 1950–51 season. After the Great Western Comibination League the club played in the Parthenon League in 1964, and winning the league in their debut season. Two seasons later they joined the Middlesex League in 1966. During their five seasons in the Middlesex League, the club went on to win the league title four times and the league cup twice.

In the 1971–72 season the club then joined the Spartan League, staying there for four seasons, while also making their debut in the FA Vase during the 1974–75 season, before joining Division Two of the Athenian League for the start of the 1975–76 season. The club made their debut in the FA Cup during the 1979–80 season. After nine seasons in the Athenian League the club joined the Isthmian League Division Two North for two seasons before switching to Division Two South, where they had their highest ever league finish in 1988–89, finishing 5th. The club then spent seven seasons in Division Two South, which was renamed to just Division Two in 1991, suffering relegation at the end of this period to Division Three. The club then remained in Division Three until they left the Isthmian League to join the Spartan League for the 1996–97 season, due to a lack of funds to carry out necessary ground improvements required for the Isthmian League.

A season after joining the Spartan League, they became founder members of the Spartan South Midlands League Premier Division South, when the London Spartan League and the South Midlands League merged. A season later after another league re-organisation they were placed in the Senior Division, which after three seasons was renamed Division One. In 2001–02, Harefield United finished second and got promoted from the newly named Division One, and also won the League Cup. With the club in the Premier Division for the 2002–03 season, they competed in the Premier League Cup, finishing as runners-up at their first attempt. The club also had more success that year by winning the Challenge Trophy beating Dunstable Town 4–1 over two legs. Further cup success continued the following season with the club winning the Premier League Cup, overcoming Brook House in the final, and they also reached the Middlesex Senior Charity Cup final, but lost 2–1 after extra time to Wealdstone.

Harefield United finished in the top six every season between 2002–03 and 2009–10 in the Spartan South Midlands League Premier Division. They finished 2nd in 2006–07, only behind Edgware Town, then in 2008–09 they finished 2nd again, only missing out on promotion and the title on goal difference, with Biggleswade Town finishing top of the league.

Manager Ian Crane left to join A.F.C. Hayes in the summer of 2012, and he was replaced by Uxbridge reserve boss Phil Granville. However, Granville left in the summer of 2015 to become Hanwell Town's manager and he was replaced by Jason Shaw in May 2015.

Between 2010–11 and 2013–14, Harefield United had two bottom half finishes, followed by two midtable finishes. They finished 4th in 2014–15, but in 2015–16, they finished 21st and were relegated to Division One. They finished 8th and 9th in their first two seasons in Division One.

In the 2018–19 season, Jason Shaw led Harefield United to promotion from the Spartan South Midlands League Division One with five games to spare in his fourth season with the club. The club won the league, winning all but two matches, and going invincible, not losing a single league game.

For the 2022–23 season the Hares joined the Combined Counties League playing at Step 5 in the Premier Division North. Jason Shaw and his staff left at the end of that season, and in September 2023 the Hares appointed Wayne Carter as the new manager. At the time of Wayne Carter joining, the club was bottom of the table without a win, but Carter guided the Hares to a midtable finish, with some decent results along the way, including a 2–0 away win at eventual champions Flackwell Heath.

In 2024–25, Carter's first full season as manager, Harefield United reached the Second Qualifying Round of the FA Cup, matching their best ever run in the competition, beating Beckenham Town and Sandhurst Town, then beating Lewes on penalties in a big upset, before losing 1–0 at Hastings United, with Davide Rodari scoring a free kick in added time to knock them out. In the same season, the Hares also had their highest league finish since their promotion back to Step 5 in 2019, finishing 4th and reaching the playoffs. They won their playoff semi-final after a late comeback at Amersham Town, scoring two goals in the last ten minutes to win 2–1, but lost 3–1 away to Bedfont Sports in the final. Carter then resigned at the end of the season to take up the management of Harrow Borough, where several Harefield United players joined him.

After Wayne Carter's departure in the summer of 2025, Harefield United announced former invincible Richard Pacquette had returned to the club as player-manager, with Marc Charles-Smith as assistant manager, and Hamza Marchoud as first team coach. The club looked very different at the start of the 2025–26 season, with all but a few players leaving over the summer. They struggled for consistency throughout Pacquette's first season, finishing 15th.

League and cup records by season
| League | | | | | | | | | | FA Cup | FA Vase |
| Season | Division | P | W | D | L | GF | GA | Pts | Pos | FA Cup | FA Vase |
|---|---|---|---|---|---|---|---|---|---|---|---|
| 1996–97 | Spartan League Premier Division | 30 | 5 | 6 | 19 | 32 | 87 | 21 | 16/16 | Preliminary Round | Second Qualifying Round |
| 1997–98 | Spartan South Midlands League Premier Division South | 28 | 7 | 6 | 15 | 27 | 67 | 27 | 13/15 | | Second Qualifying Round |
| 1998–99 | Spartan South Midlands League Senior Division | 42 | 8 | 5 | 29 | 48 | 112 | 29 | 20/22 | | |
| 1999–00 | Spartan South Midlands League Senior Division | 36 | 8 | 13 | 15 | 40 | 49 | 36* | 15/19 | | First Round |
| 2000–01 | Spartan South Midlands League Senior Division | 36 | 10 | 9 | 17 | 53 | 59 | 39 | 15/19 | | Second Qualifying Round |
| 2001–02 | Spartan South Midlands League Division One | 38 | 25 | 6 | 7 | 85 | 36 | 81 | 2/20 | | Second Round |
| 2002–03 | Spartan South Midlands League Premier Division | 36 | 21 | 7 | 8 | 79 | 45 | 70 | 4/19 | Second Qualifying Round | First Round |
| 2003–04 | Spartan South Midlands League Premier Division | 36 | 22 | 5 | 9 | 87 | 50 | 71 | 5/19 | Extra Preliminary Round | Third Round |
| 2004–05 | Spartan South Midlands League Premier Division | 38 | 15 | 17 | 6 | 48 | 33 | 62 | 5/20 | Extra Preliminary Round | Third Round |
| 2005–06 | Spartan South Midlands League Premier Division | 38 | 23 | 9 | 6 | 81 | 38 | 78 | 4/20 | Extra Preliminary Round | First Qualifying Round |
| 2006–07 | Spartan South Midlands League Premier Division | 40 | 29 | 5 | 6 | 95 | 35 | 92 | 2/21 | Preliminary Round | First Round |
| 2007–08 | Spartan South Midlands League Premier Division | 42 | 25 | 5 | 12 | 86 | 52 | 80 | 5/22 | Extra Preliminary Round | Fourth Round |
| 2008–09 | Spartan South Midlands League Premier Division | 40 | 26 | 7 | 7 | 103 | 45 | 85 | 2/21 | Preliminary Round | Third Round |
| 2009–10 | Spartan South Midlands League Premier Division | 42 | 23 | 4 | 15 | 81 | 67 | 73 | 6/22 | Second Qualifying Round | First Round |
| 2010–11 | Spartan South Midlands League Premier Division | 44 | 10 | 8 | 26 | 61 | 109 | 38 | 21/23 | Preliminary Round | Second Qualifying Round |
| 2011–12 | Spartan South Midlands League Premier Division | 42 | 11 | 7 | 24 | 51 | 92 | 40 | 18/22 | Preliminary Round | First Qualifying Round |
| 2012–13 | Spartan South Midlands League Premier Division | 42 | 17 | 12 | 13 | 77 | 67 | 63 | 10/22 | Second Qualifying Round | First Qualifying Round |
| 2013–14 | Spartan South Midlands League Premier Division | 42 | 14 | 8 | 20 | 85 | 82 | 50 | 14/22 | Preliminary Round | First Qualifying Round |
| 2014–15 | Spartan South Midlands League Premier Division | 42 | 25 | 6 | 11 | 96 | 64 | 81 | 4/22 | Preliminary Round | First Round |
| 2015–16 | Spartan South Midlands League Premier Division | 42 | 9 | 4 | 29 | 42 | 106 | 31 | 21/22 | Extra Preliminary Round | First Round |
| 2016–17 | Spartan South Midlands League Division One | 40 | 20 | 8 | 12 | 82 | 47 | 68 | 8/21 | First Qualifying Round | Second Qualifying Round |
| 2017–18 | Spartan South Midlands League Division One | 38 | 18 | 7 | 13 | 77 | 54 | 61 | 9/20 | | First Qualifying Round |
| 2018–19 | Spartan South Midlands League Division One | 38 | 36 | 2 | 0 | 125 | 34 | 110 | 1/20 | | First Round |
| 2019–20 | Spartan South Midlands League Premier Division | 27 | 8 | 7 | 12 | 41 | 48 | 31 | – | Preliminary Round | Second Qualifying Round |
| 2020–21 | Spartan South Midlands League Premier Division | 12 | 7 | 0 | 5 | 23 | 24 | 21 | – | Preliminary Round | First Qualifying Round |
| 2021–22 | Spartan South Midlands League Premier Division | 38 | 12 | 10 | 16 | 70 | 67 | 46 | 11/20 | First Qualifying Round | Second Round |
| 2022–23 | Combined Counties League Premier Division North | 38 | 13 | 4 | 21 | 71 | 78 | 43 | 14/20 | Preliminary Round | Fifth Round |
| 2023–24 | Combined Counties League Premier Division North | 38 | 14 | 4 | 20 | 52 | 63 | 46 | 13/20 | Extra Preliminary Round | Third Round |
| 2024–25 | Combined Counties League Premier Division North | 38 | 22 | 5 | 11 | 84 | 58 | 71 | 4/20 | Second Qualifying Round | Second Round |
| 2025–26 | Combined Counties League Premier Division North | 38 | 11 | 8 | 19 | 63 | 75 | 41 | 15/20 | Preliminary Round | First Qualifying Round |

*Deducted one point

Promoted
Qualified for playoffs
Relgated
Transferred to another league

== Ground ==
Harefield United play their home games at Preston Park, Breakspear Road North, Harefield UB9 6NE.

In 2010 the ground won the Steps 5 and 6 National Award for Groundsman of the year.

In January 2026, the club announced plans to improve Preston Park with a 3G pitch.

== Managerial history ==
- Tony Choules 1995–1997
- Vic Harris 1997–1999
- Stuart Leavy 1999–2007
- Glen Bellis 2007–2009
- Darren Feighery 2009–2010
- Graham Goode 2010–2011
- Ian Crane 2011–2012
- Phil Granvill 2012–2015
- Jason Shaw 2015–2023
- Ray Green 2023
- Wayne Carter 2023–2025
- Richard Pacquette 2025–present

== Notable former players ==
For all Harefield United F.C. players with a Wikipedia article, see Category:Harefield United F.C. players

== Club honours ==
=== League honours ===
- Spartan South Midlands Football League Premier Division:
  - Runners-up: 2006–07, 2008–09
- Spartan South Midlands Football League Division One:
  - Winners: 2018–2019
- Spartan South Midlands Football League Division One:
  - Runners-up: 2001–02
- Great Western Combination League Division One:
  - Winners: 1950–51
- Great Western Combination League Division Two:
  - Winners: 1947–48
- Parthenon League:
  - Winners: 1964–65

=== Cup honours ===
- Middlesex Premier Cup:
  - Winners: 2018–2019
- Middlesex Senior Cup:
  - Runners-up: 2020–21
- Middlesex Senior Charity Cup:
  - Runners-up: 2003–04
- Chesham Cup:
  - Winners: 1947–48
- Spartan South Midlands Football League Cup:
  - Winners: 2001–02
- Spartan South Midlands Football League Challenge Trophy:
  - Winners: 2002–03
- Spartan South Midlands Football League Premier League Cup:
  - WInners: 2003–04
  - Runners-up: 2002–03

== Club records ==
- Highest league position: 5th in Isthmian League Division Two South 1988–89
- FA Cup best performance: Second Qualifying Round 1980–81, 1986–87, 1987–88, 2002–03, 2009–10, 2011–12, 2024–25
- FA Vase best performance: Quarter-final 1989–90
- Highest attendance: 497 vs Hatfield Town 2018–2019
