= AFCH =

AFCH may refer to:

- A.F.C. Hayes
- A.F.C. Hornchurch
