= Ryan Kirby =

English footballer & manager (born 1974)

Personal information
- Date of birth: 6 September 1974 (age 52)
- Place of birth: Chingford, England
- Height: 1.83 m (6 ft 0 in)
- Positions: Right back; centre half

Youth career
- Brimsdown Rovers
- Arsenal

Senior career*
Years	Team	Apps	(Gls)
1993–1994	Arsenal	0	(0)
1994–1996	Doncaster Rovers	78	(0)
1996	Preston North End	0	(0)
1996	Crewe Alexandra	0	(0)
1996	Wigan Athletic	6	(0)
1996	Northampton Town	1	(0)
1996–2001	Stevenage Borough	61	(5)
2001	→ Aldershot Town (loan)		
2001–2002	Aldershot Town		
2002–2004	Harlow Town		
2004–2006	Thurrock		
2006–2008	Harlow Town		
2009	AFC Hornchurch		
2009–2010	Boreham Wood		
2010–2012	Harlow Town		
2012–2014	Grays Athletic	60	(1)

Managerial career
- 2006–2008: Harlow Town (player-manager)
- 2013–2014: Grays Athletic (player-manager)
- * Club domestic league appearances and goals as of 19:12, 10 August 2014 (UTC)

Ryan Kirby (born 6 September 1974) is an English former professional footballer who was last player-manager of Grays Athletic.

== Playing career ==
Kirby, who played as a right back and centre half, began his career with the youth team of Brimsdown Rovers alongside David Beckham, and later played for Arsenal, Doncaster Rovers, Preston North End, Crewe Alexandra, Wigan Athletic, Northampton Town, Stevenage Borough, Aldershot Town and Harlow Town.

He moved from Harlow Town to Thurrock in August 2004. Kirby then returned to Harlow Town, where he was player-manager between November 2006 and December 2008. During 2009 he played for AFC Hornchurch and Boreham Wood. He left Harlow Town in June 2012 to join Grays Athletic.

In his first season at Grays Athletic, they were crowned champions of the Isthmian League Division One North. He later became player-manager, before leaving at the end of the 2013–14 season. Kirby made a total of 74 appearances in all competitions scoring once, over two seasons.
