= Spartan South Midlands Football League =

Ninth and Tenth tier of English league football

- Founded: 1997
- Country: England
- Divisions: 3
- Number of clubs: 58
- Level on pyramid: Levels 9–11
- Feeder to: Southern Football League Division One Central; Isthmian League Division One North
- Domestic cup(s): Challenge Trophy; Premier Division Cup; Division One Cup; Division Two Cup
- Current champions: Haringey Borough (Premier Division); Everett Rovers (Division One) (2025-26)
- Website: Official website
- Current: 2026–27 Season

The Spartan South Midlands Football League is an English football league covering Hertfordshire, northwest Greater London, central Buckinghamshire and southern Bedfordshire. It is a feeder to the Southern Football League or the Isthmian League, and consists of five divisions – three for first teams (Premier Division, Division One and Division Two), and two for reserve teams (Reserve Division One and Reserve Division Two).

The Premier Division is at step 5 (or level 9) and Division One at step 6 (level 10) of the National League System (NLS) respectively. Division Two, at level 11, and the reserve divisions are not part of the NLS.

== History ==
The Spartan South Midlands Football League was formed in 1997 following the merger of the Spartan League and the South Midlands League. The inaugural 1997–98 season operated as a transitional structure and consisted of five divisions: Premier Division North, Premier Division South, Senior Division, Division One North and Division One South. These divisions were populated by clubs from the two predecessor competitions.

At the end of the first season, the two Premier Divisions were merged to form a single Premier Division for the 1998–99 campaign. The two Division One sections were also discontinued after 1997–98, with the league operating a single Division One from 1998–99 onwards.

Further restructuring took place in 2001. The Senior Division, which had served as the league's second tier since the merger, was renamed Division One, while the existing Division One was redesignated Division Two. This created a three‑division structure—Premier Division, Division One and Division Two—that has remained in place since.

== Current Spartan South Midlands League members ==
=== Premier Division ===
- AFC Welwyn
- Arlesey Town
- Aylesbury Vale Dynamos
- Baldock Town
- Biggleswade United
- Cockfosters
- Colney Heath
- Crawley Green
- Dunstable Town
- Enfield
- Haringey Borough
- Harlow Town
- Harpenden Town
- Kempston Rovers
- Kings Langley
- Potton United
- Risborough Rangers
- Sawbridgeworth Town
- Tring Athletic
- Winslow United
- Wormley Rovers

=== Division One ===
- Ampthill Town
- Buckingham
- Cranfield United
- Desborough Town
- Eaton Socon
- Huntingdon Town
- Irchester United
- Langford
- Leighton Town Reserves
- Letchworth Garden City Eagles
- London Colney
- Long Buckby
- Moulton
- Raunds Town
- Rothwell Corinthians
- Royston Town Reserves
- Rushden & Higham United
- Stotfold FC Reserves
- Wellingborough Whitworth

=== Division Two ===
- AFC Caddington
- Aston Clinton
- Bovingdon
- Codicote
- Eynesbury United
- Huntingdon Town U23's
- MK College Academy
- Milton Keynes Irish reserves
- New Bradwell St Peter
- Newport Pagnell Town reserves
- Old Bradwell United
- Padbury Village
- Pitstone & Ivinghoe
- Sarratt
- Stony Stratford Town
- The 61
- Totternhoe
- Tring Corinthians
Locations of the Spartan South Midlands Football League clubs by division
– Premier Division – Division One

== Divisional champions ==
=== 1997–98 ===
For the league's first "transitional" season, the members of the amalgamating leagues were split into three tiers, "Premier", "Senior" and "Division One". The top and bottom tier were split geographically into North and South Sections.

Season	Premier North	Premier South	Senior	One North	One South
1997–98	Brache Sparta	Brook House	New Bradwell St Peter	Luton Old Boys	Old Roan

=== 1998–2001 ===
In 1998, the geographic sections were abolished, and a simple three-tier structure with promotion and relegation between the divisions was introduced.

Season	Premier	Senior	Division One
1998–99	Barkingside	Holmer Green	Bridger Packaging
1999–00	Arlesey Town	Tring Athletic	Dunstable Town
2000–01	Beaconsfield SYCOB	Letchworth	Pitstone & Ivinghoe

=== 2001–date ===
In 2001, the Senior Division and Division One were renamed Divisions One and Two respectively.

Season	Premier	Division One	Division Two
2001–02	London Colney	Greenacres	Mursley United
2002–03	Dunstable Town	Pitstone & Ivinghoe	Buckingham Athletic
2003–04	Beaconsfield SYCOB	Haywood United	Old Dunstablians
2004–05	Potters Bar Town	Oxhey Jets	Crawley Green Sports
2005–06	Oxford City	Colney Heath	Aston Clinton
2006–07	Edgware Town	Brimsdown Rovers	AFC Dunstable
2007–08	Beaconsfield SYCOB	Kentish Town	Kings Langley
2008–09	Biggleswade Town	Royston Town	The 61 F.C. (Luton)
2009–10	Aylesbury	Holmer Green	Berkhamsted
2010–11	Chalfont St. Peter	Berkhamsted	Padbury United
2011–12	Royston Town	London Colney	Aston Clinton
2012–13	Dunstable Town	London Lions	Kent Athletic
2013–14	Hanwell Town	Sun Postal Sports	Hale Leys United
2014–15	Kings Langley	Welwyn Garden City	Hale Leys United
2015–16	AFC Dunstable	Edgware Town	Kent Athletic
2016–17	London Colney	Biggleswade	Thame Rangers
2017–18	Welwyn Garden City	Southall	Park View
2018–19	Biggleswade	Harefield United	Bovingdon
2019–20	Season abandoned due to the coronavirus pandemic		
2020–21	Season curtailed due to the local lockdowns		
2021–22	New Salamis	Stotfold	Old Bradwell United
2022–23	Leighton Town	Real Bedford	Old Bradwell United
2023–24	Real Bedford	Northampton ON Chenecks	AFC Welwyn
2024–25	Milton Keynes Irish	AFC Welwyn	New Bradwell St Peter
2025–26	Haringey Borough	Everett Rovers	Pitstone & Ivinghoe
