= Brook House F.C. =

Association football club in England

Coordinates: 51°32′05″N 0°24′53″W

Brook House
- Full name: Brook House Football Club
- Nickname: The Brook
- Founded: 1974
- Ground: Farm Park, Hayes
- Capacity: 2,000 (150 seated)
- Chairman: Barry Stone
- Manager: Martin Mclaughlin/Lester Pyle
- League: Combined Counties League Division One
- 2024–25: Combined Counties League Division One, 8th of 23
Home colours	Away colours

Brook House Football Club is a football club based in Hayes, Greater London, England. Founded in 1974, they are currently members of the Combined Counties League Division One and play at Farm Park.

== History ==
Brook House Football Club was formed as a Sunday league club in 1974 by Saturday clubs Charville and Hayes North and joined Division Seven of the Hayes and District Sunday League. After a successful period that involved several cup and league titles, the club switched to Saturday football in 1982, joining the South-West Middlesex League. In 1984 they were founder members of the Middlesex County League, where they remained until joining Division One of the Spartan League in 1988. Despite only finishing sixth in 1988–89, they were promoted to the Premier Division. In 1992 floodlights were erected at Park Farm for the first time and officially opened with a friendly against Chelsea, for whom former Brook House player Neil Shipperley scored a hat-trick in a 5–1 win; Shipperley's father Dave managed the club during the 1990s. In 1992–93 they entered the FA Cup for the first time, losing to Aveley in the preliminary round.

When the Spartan and South Midlands League merged in 1997 to form the Spartan South Midlands League, Brook House were placed in the Premier Division South, going on to win the league that season. They were subsequently placed in the Premier Division the following season, where they remained until the end of the 2003–04 season, when they were transferred to Division Two of the Isthmian League after finishing as runners-up. After two third-placed finishes, the club were promoted to Division One South & West of the Southern League for the 2006–07 season. After finishing 18th in their first season in the Southern League, the club were renamed A.F.C. Hayes in 2007. In 2008–09 they won the Middlesex Senior Cup, beating Hendon 2–1 in the final. The club moved divisions again in 2010 when they were placed in Division One Central of the Southern League.

AFC Hayes finished bottom of the division in 2014–15 and were relegated to the Premier Division of the Combined Counties League. In 2018–19 they finished second-from-bottom of the Premier Division and were relegated to Division One. In May 2022 the club announced they were reverting to the name Brook House. They won the Middlesex Premier Cup in 2023–24, beating Rising Ballers Kensington on penalties in the final.

=== Season-by-season record ===
Season	League									FA Cup
Season	Division	P	W	D	L	F	A	Pts	Pos	FA Cup
1988–89	Spartan League Division One	30	15	8	7	58	31	53	6/16	
1989–90	Spartan League Premier Division	36	10	8	18	47	72	38	11/19	
1990–91	Spartan League Premier Division	36	12	8	16	52	60	44	12/19	
1991–92	Spartan League Premier Division	36	21	6	9	68	51	69	4/19	
1992–93	Spartan League Premier Division	42	14	6	22	72	99	48	14/22	Preliminary round
1993–94	Spartan League Premier Division	36	16	3	17	64	68	51	9/19	First qualifying
1994–95	Spartan League Premier Division	30	13	5	12	69	52	44	7/16	First qualifying
1995–96	Spartan League Premier Division	30	10	8	12	29	37	38	9/16	First qualifying
1996–97	Spartan League Premier Division	30	9	5	16	31	55	32	13/16	
1997–98	Spartan South Midlands League Premier Division South	28	18	6	4	66	27	60	1/15	
1998–99	Spartan South Midlands League Premier Division	44	24	11	9	74	42	83	5/23	First qualifying
1999–2000	Spartan South Midlands League Premier Division	40	27	6	7	102	33	89 (Note: Two points awarded)	2/21	First qualifying
2000–01	Spartan South Midlands League Premier Division	36	22	6	8	64	36	72	4/19	First qualifying
2001–02	Spartan South Midlands League Premier Division	38	19	7	12	89	63	64	6/20	First qualifying
2002–03	Spartan South Midlands League Premier Division	36	10	9	17	36	67	36 (Note: Three points deducted)	17/19	Preliminary round
2003–04	Spartan South Midlands League Premier Division	36	26	2	8	82	35	80	2/19	Preliminary round
2004–05	Isthmian League Division Two	30	20	4	6	65	25	64	3/16	First qualifying
2005–06	Isthmian League Division Two	30	17	7	6	63	33	58	3/16	Second qualifying
2006–07	Southern League Division One South & West	42	14	6	22	71	92	48	18/22	Preliminary round
2007–08	Southern League Division One South & West	42	17	4	21	75	99	55	14/22	Preliminary round
2008–09	Southern League Division One South & West	42	18	7	17	80	92	64	9/22	Preliminary round
2009–10	Southern League Division One South & West	42	7	4	31	55	105	25	21/22 (Note: Reprieved from relegation)	Preliminary round
2010–11	Southern League Division One Central	42	11	6	25	54	96	39	19/22	Preliminary round
2011–12	Southern League Division One Central	42	14	16	12	58	59	58	10/22	First qualifying
2012–13	Southern League Division One Central	42	13	8	21	74	81	47	15/22	Preliminary round
2013–14	Southern League Division One Central	42	12	8	22	51	74	44	18/22	Preliminary round
2014–15	Southern League Division One Central	42	8	7	27	39	88	31	22/22	Preliminary round
2015–16	Combined Counties League Premier Division	42	14	7	21	63	86	49	16/22	Preliminary round
2016–17	Combined Counties League Premier Division	44	14	9	21	64	82	51	17/23	Preliminary round
2017–18	Combined Counties League Premier Division	42	13	7	22	57	84	46	18/22	Extra-preliminary round
2018–19	Combined Counties League Premier Division	38	11	7	20	51	68	40	19/22	Extra-preliminary round
2019–20	Combined Counties League Division One	22	9	4	9	51	50	31	– (Note: Season abandoned)	Extra-preliminary round
2020–21	Combined Counties League Division One	7	3	1	3	12	14	10	–	–
2021–22	Combined Counties League Division One	40	16	7	17	73	70	55	10/21	–
2022–23	Combined Counties League Division One	40	9	4	27	57	112	31	18/21	–
2023–24	Combined Counties League Division One	42	13	7	22	75	104	46	17/22	–

== Stadium ==
The club play their home games at Farm Park on Kingshill Avenue in Hayes. The ground has a capacity of 2,000, of which 200 is covered and 150 is seated.

== Honours ==
- Isthmian League
  - Associates Member Trophy winners 2005–06
- Spartan South Midlands League:
  - Premier Division champions 1997–98
  - Premier Cup winners 1999–2000
  - Challenge Trophy winners 2003–04
- Middlesex Senior Cup
  - Winners: 2008–09
- Middlesex Premier Cup
  - Winners 2023–24

== Records ==
- Best league performance: 3rd in Isthmian League Division Two, 2004–05, 2005–06
- Best FA Cup performance: Second qualifying round, 2005–06
- Best FA Trophy performance: First qualifying round, 2006–07, 2008–09, 2010–11, 2011–12
- Best FA Vase performance: Fifth round, 2004–05

== See also ==
- Brook House F.C. players
