= Brimsdown Rovers F.C. =

Former football club in London Borough of Enfield

- Full name: Brimsdown Rovers Football Club
- Nickname(s): The Magpies
- Founded: 1947
- Dissolved: 2010
- Ground: Goldsdown Road
- Capacity: 3,000
- 2009–10: Spartan South Midlands League; Premier Division, 21st
Home colours	Away colours

Brimsdown Rovers F.C. were a football club based in Brimsdown in the London Borough of Enfield, England. They played their home games at the Goldsdown Road stadium, Brimsdown in the London Borough of Enfield. Notable former players include David Beckham & Josh Scowen who both played for the youth team, and Ryan Kirby.

== History ==
=== Early years ===
Brimsdown Rovers was formed in 1947 by a number of Geordies following a merger with a club called Durham Rovers.

The club's colours have always been the black and white stripes of Newcastle United, whilst in the early days their change of strip saw the red and white stripes of Sunderland in use, to keep everyone happy. As with Newcastle United, its mascot has also always been a magpie.

Playing on the local playing fields, the club entered the Enfield Football Alliance and in the first season were joint winners of Division One. The club were runners-up in the Premier Division for the next two seasons and won the League Cup in 1948–49.

In 1950 the club joined the Northern Suburban League, again winning Division One in their first season. In the next 25 seasons, the Club won the Premier Division on six occasions, the most ever by any club, and since the League's demise, the Championship Shield has hung on Brimsdown Rovers' clubhouse wall.

In acknowledgement of the club's past and in an attempt to contribute to junior football in the area, Brimsdown Rovers still retains close links with the Enfield Football Alliance. The League use the club's facilities for all of their League and Committee meetings as well as fund raising events and stage their domestic cup semi-finals and finals at the ground every season.

In 1956 the club was offered a then 11.5-acre (47,000 m^{2}) site, which is still its home, but which has been enlarged by the acquisition in 1993 of the adjacent Johnson Matthey ground. A brick clubhouse was built in 1958, allowing the club to donate its existing wooden building to a local scout group, which is still in use.

Since then the clubhouse has seen a number of extensions and improvements made, including separate changing room facilities in 1964.

The players of that early period were also responsible for laying the cricket table and shared the ground with the cricket club and this was typical of the commitment shown by the players of that era. There are now, inevitably, only a handful of survivors from the club's original two teams, and some of them still use the social facilities on a regular basis.

The club joined the London Spartan League in 1976 and won Reserve (Intermediate) Division Two B in their first season, finished runners-up in Division One the following season, won that Division in 1982 and gained promotion to the Senior Division.

=== Senior status ===
In 1982–83, the club finished third in the league and won the London Intermediate Cup, gaining Senior Status and promotion to the Premier Division. In the 16 subsequent seasons the Club only ever finished outside the top five on six occasions, finished runners-up in 1991–92 and won the Championship the following season under Manager Derek Townshend and Assistant Tony Faulkner. However, this successful management team were unceremoniously dismissed at the end of that season by the then club chairman on the very night that the Spartan League Championship Shield was presented to them.

In 1997–98 the Spartan League and the South Midlands League amalgamated, and the Club stayed in the Premier Division of the new Spartan South Midlands League for a season. They endured a disastrous season finishing in last place and were relegated to the Senior Division, now Division One, several weeks before the season's end. In the ensuing six seasons in division 1 they finished 8th, 14th, 17th, 11th, 10th and 11th in the table.

In 2002–03 Gary Brooker became chairman and on the resignation of Manager Tony Faulkner, Stewart Margolis was appointed Manager in 2004–05. Margolis went back to Ilford in January 2006, and Gordon Boateng and Rudi Geohagen were appointed and brought an influx of new players and the club rose from a mid-table position to finish the season in fifth place. In 2006–07, the club won the championship and gained promotion back to the Premier Division.

The club were also beaten finalists in the Spartan League Cup in 1986–87 and 1987–88, but won the competition in 1996–97 in a replay against League Champions, St. Margaretsbury.

In other cup competitions in recent years, the club won the Roy Bailey Memorial Trophy in 1991–92, were finalists in the London Senior Cup in 1992–93 and won the Tottenham Charity Cup in 1994–95 and last season won the SSML Division One Cup beating Buckingham Athletic 1–0 at Tring.

In the FA Cup, the club's most significant season, was in their first season of entry 1991–92, when after holding St. Albans City of the Diadora League Premier Division to a 1–1 draw away at Clarence Park in the second qualifying round, they defeated them 2–1 in the replay, and in the third qualifying round were drawn against Chesham United also of the Diadora Premier Division at home and again achieved a 2–2 draw after being 2–0 down in 15 minutes, but lost the replay 2–1.

In the FA Vase in the first season in the competition in 1984–85, the club reached the Second Round only to lose to the holders Stansted in a replay after conceding a late equalising goal in injury time in the first game. Its best performance was in 1993–94 when the club reached the Third Round before losing to Soham Town Rangers.

In 1982–83 the club decided to concentrate on developing a youth team policy to secure the long-term success of the club. The youth section has regularly enjoyed success at both League and County level since its formation and its most famous product is David Beckham, the Manchester United and England star who also played for Real Madrid. From the same team in which David played, Micah Hyde (Watford) now with Burnley and Jason Brissett (Walsall) both made the professional ranks whilst Ryan Kirby had spells at Arsenal, Doncaster Rovers, Stevenage Borough and Aldershot and Ian Wiles, a more recent product of the youth section, signed for Colchester United. Following these players' examples, there were a number of boys who regularly attended various Schools of Excellence.

In 2005–06 a Reserve team was formed. It played its first season in the Enfield Alliance League, and now plays in the SSML Reserve Division Two.

== Sunday football ==
Up until 1990, the club also ran a Sunday football section which played in the Mercury Waltham Football League and always figured prominently in domestic competitions, as well as winning the Middlesex Intermediate Cup in 1981–82 and the London Intermediate Cup the following season.

Following years of success at youth level, the club re-introduced Sunday morning football in 1997–98. Under 18's Manager Paul Ulatowski and his team forming the core of the side. In that season they finished runners-up in Division Two of the Waltham Sunday League and won the League's Intermediate Cup. In 2000–01 promotion to the Premier Division was gained and in 2001–02 they won the League Senior Cup and the following season the Championship and again the League Senior Cup were won.

== Youth teams ==
Brimsdown Rovers F.C. was famous for David Beckham having played in its youth teams. He joined Brimsdown Rovers as a 14-year-old, and played in their youth team for two years, becoming Under-15 Player of The Year in 1990. Six of the side went on to play professionally, including Micah Hyde, who played in the Premier League with Watford, and Jason Brissett and Ryan Kirby, who both joined Arsenal. Beckham presented memorabilia to the club including a shirt bearing his name and original squad number of 28, which was later stolen from the clubhouse. The Brimsdown Rovers under 13s reformed in 2015 and are currenting playing in the Cheshunt Youth league.

== Stadium ==
By 2010 the club had a Ryman B graded ground with covered seating for 150 spectators and covered standing areas for 300, turnstiles, toilets and food bar. These improvements came as a direct result of the groundshare with Enfield Town from 2001 onwards. Town's plans to move into the larger QE2 stadium in Enfield caused fears for the future of Rovers, who would not have been able to survive without the groundshare. As a result, Rovers announced a merger with Enfield 1893 in April 2010.

== Records ==
- Best FA Cup performance: Third qualifying round, 1991–92 (replay)
- Best FA Vase performance: Fourth round, 2010–11
