= Harpenden Town F.C. =

Association football club in England

Coordinates: 51°48′46″N 0°21′38″W

Harpenden Town
- Full name: Harpenden Town Football Club
- Nickname: The Harps
- Founded: 1891
- Ground: Rothamsted Park, Harpenden
- Capacity: 1,000
- Chairman: David Russell
- Manager: Jimmy Gray
- League: Spartan South Midlands League Premier Division
- 2025–26: Spartan South Midlands League Premier Division, 9th of 20
Home colours	Away colours

Harpenden Town Football Club is a football club based in Harpenden, Hertfordshire, England. They are currently members of the Spartan South Midlands League Premier Division and play at Rothamsted Park.

== History ==
The club was established in 1891 as Harpenden Football Club. They were founder members of the Herts County Senior League in 1898, but left after two seasons. They also played in the Mid-Herts League, winning the league on several occasions. In 1908 the club adopted their current name and rejoined the Herts County Senior League, becoming members of the Western Division. They won the Western Division in 1910–11, but were runners-up in the subsequent three-team championship play-off. They retained the Western Division title the following season, going on to win the championship play-offs. They were Western Division runners-up the following season.

In 1920–21 Harpenden were Western Division champions again, but finished bottom of the championship play-off. The following season saw the club finish bottom of the Mid West Division, after which they left the league. In 1948 the club returned to the league and were placed in Division One. They were league champions in 1950–51, 1952–53 and 1954–55, finishing runners-up in the seasons in-between. The club was placed in Division 1A in 1955–56 for a transitional season, and finished as runners-up before being placed into the Premier Division the following season due to a reorganisation of the league. In 1957 the club moved up to the Premier Division of the South Midlands League.

Harpenden were South Midlands League champions in 1961–62 and again in 1964–65. They won both the League Shield and the Herts Charity Shield in 1967–68, and although they finished as runners-up in 1969–70, the club were relegated to Division One after finishing bottom of the Premier Division in 1972–73. The following season saw them make an immediate return to the Premier Division, as a third-place finish saw them promoted. They were relegated to Division One again at the end of the 1981–82 season. In 1989–90 the club were Division One champions, earning promotion back to the Premier Division. In 1997 the league merged with the Spartan League to form the Spartan South Midlands League, with Harpenden placed in the Premier Division North. An eighth-place finish in 1997–98 saw them gain a place in the Premier Division for the 1998–99 season. However, after finishing second-from-bottom of the table in their first season in the division, they ended the 1999–2000 season bottom of the table and were relegated to the Senior Division, which was renamed Division One in 2001.

Harpenden were Division One runners-up in 2002–03, earning promotion to the Premier Division. However, they were relegated back to Division One after finishing bottom of the Premier Division in 2005–06. The club ended the 2016–17 season as Division One runners-up, earning promotion to the Premier Division. The following season saw them win the Premier Division Cup, beating Welwyn Garden City 3–1 in the final. In 2023–24 they finished third in the Premier Division, qualifying for the promotion play-offs, in which they lost 3–1 to Leverstock Green in the semi-finals.

== Ground ==
The club play at Rothamsted Park on Amenbury Lane. During the 1990–91 season the Centenary Stand was built and floodlights installed. In 2023 an artificial pitch was installed and grass banking was replaced with terracing.

== Honours ==
- Spartan South Midlands League
  - Premier Division Cup winners 2017–18
- South Midlands League
  - Premier Division champions 1961–62, 1964–65
  - Division One champions 1989–90
  - League Shield winners 1967–68
- Herts Senior County League
  - Champions 1911–12, 1950–51, 1952–53, 1954–55
  - Western Division champions 1910–11, 1911–12, 1920–21
- Herts Charity Shield
  - Winners 1967–68

== Records ==
- Best FA Cup performance: First qualifying round, 1998–99, 2024–25
- Best FA Vase performance: Fourth round, 2025–26

== See also ==
- Harpenden Town F.C. players
