= Hanwell Town F.C. =

Association football club in England

Coordinates: 51°31′57″N 0°19′44″W

Hanwell Town
- Full name: Hanwell Town Football Club
- Nickname: The Geordies
- Founded: 1920; 106 years ago
- Ground: Reynolds Field, Perivale
- Capacity: 3,000
- Chairman: Bob Fisher
- Manager: Chris Moore
- League: Southern League Premier Division South
- 2025–26: Southern League Premier Division South, 14th of 22
Home colours	Away colours

Hanwell Town Football Club are a semi-professional football club representing Hanwell, playing at Perivale in the London Borough of Ealing, England. They were the London Spartan League Senior Division champions in 1983 and the Spartan South Midlands League Premier Division champions in 2014. The club is affiliated to the Middlesex County Football Association.

== History ==
The club was formed in 1920 by a group of natives of Newcastle-upon-Tyne who were working in the Hanwell area, who adopted the famous black and white stripes of Newcastle United as their colours. They played in the London League during the 1920s but dropped down to more local leagues after World War II, where they remained for over twenty years.

In 1970, the club made the step up to the Middlesex County League and by the early 80s were playing in the London Spartan League. In 1983–84, they were Senior Division champions and were promoted to the Premier Division. During their time in the London Spartan league premier Division, the club reached the final of the London Senior Cup three consecutive seasons (1991–92 to 1993–94) winning it twice. It was also in this period that the club made their debut in the FA Cup in the 1988–89 season, making it to the Second Qualifying round, losing to Wembley 1–0 at home.

When the league amalgamated with the South Midlands League in 1998, Hanwell were placed in the Premier Division South but after the league's initial transitional season, a reorganisation saw them moved down into the Senior Division. They immediately won promotion back to the Premier Division where they remained until reorganisation of the non-league system in 2006 saw them placed in the new Southern League Division One South and West. In their first season in this division, they finished second bottom and were relegated. The club were then jointly managed by former player Keith Rowlands (the club's leading scorer) and Boysie Wise who succeeded Chris Boothe in May 2008. Wise left at the end of the 2009–10 season. The team was then managed by club leading scorer Keith Rowlands but after sliding into the relegation places, by December 2011, Rowlands resigned. He was replaced by Tommy Williams. The club finished in 21st place but was saved from relegation because no club came down from Step 4 of the football pyramid to the Spartan South Midlands League.

Williams left the club at the end of the season and was succeeded by former manager Ray Duffy, returning for his second spell in charge. Duffy, with the assistance of his four sons and nephew playing in the team led the club to a sixth-place finish in his first season back. In 2014 they won the Spartan League Premier Division title by 14 points, going the whole season losing just one league game and were promoted back to the Southern League for the first time since 2006–07. In their first season back at this level, Hanwell finished in 7th place, the highest position the club has been in the football pyramid, while the club were also runners up in the Middlesex Senior Cup having lost 1–0 in the final to Harrow Borough. Ray Duffy and coach Mark Adams stood down at the end of the season being replaced by Phil Granville, assisted by Dave Tilbury who arrived from Harefield United.

In November 2015, despite leading Hanwell Town to the third qualifying round of the FA Cup - the furthest the club have ever been, manager Phil Granville and assistant Dave Tilbury parted company with Hanwell after just six months in charge with the club in 18th place. On 30 November 2015, returning to the side just a few months after leaving was Ray Duffy for a third spell as manager, assisted by Mark Adams. The second half of the season proved difficult leaving the club third from bottom going into the last week of the season, but after two victories Hanwell finished 20th on 39 points. At the end of the 2017–18 season, as a result of structural changes by the FA to Step 4 of the non-league pyramid, the club was moved laterally to the Isthmian League, South Central Division.

At the end of the 2021–22 season, Hanwell were promoted after beating Chertsey Town 3–2 after extra time to win the Isthmian South Central Division play-off final. It means Hanwell will play Step 3 football for the first time in their history, with the team placed in the 2022–23 Southern Premier Division South.

In May 2022, joint-manager Wayne Carter left Hanwell to take up the manager's position at Isthmian South Central side Chertsey Town - leaving Chris Moore in sole charge.

== Ground ==
Hanwell Town play their home games at Reynolds Field in Perivale.

Hanwell moved to the ground in 1981 after over twenty years playing at the Ealing Central Sports Ground. Floodlights were installed in 1989 and inaugurated with a match against Tottenham Hotspur, since then a stand and disabled facilities have been added. More recent additions to the ground include the newly built Bob Fisher Stand in honour of the current chairman who has been with the club for sixty years.

== Players ==
=== Current squad ===
As of 27 July 2026

Note: Flags indicate national team as defined under FIFA eligibility rules; some limited exceptions apply. Players may hold more than one non-FIFA nationality.

No.	Pos.	Nation	Player
—	GK	ENG	Sam Beasant (captain)
—	GK	MSR	Trent Carter-Rogers
—	DF	ENG	Ibby Sankoh
—	DF	ENG	Dwayne Duncan
—	DF	ENG	Harry Seabrook
—	DF	ENG	Joe Wilson
—	DF	TAN	Roberto Nditi
—	MF	ENG	Zak Joseph
—	MF	ENG	Willem Tomlinson
—	MF	ENG	Max Herbert
—	MF	ENG	Ollie Turner
—	MF	ENG	Ade Olumuyiwa
—	MF	ENG	Eddie Cooper
—	FW	ENG	Harvey Bradbury
—	FW	GER	Manu Oke-William
—	FW	DMA	Jordan Esprit
—	FW	ENG	Henry Snee
—	FW	ENG	Kaleel Green
—	FW	ANG	Andrio Brandao

== Backroom staff ==
=== Club staff ===
Position	Staff
Director of Football	Ray Duffy
Manager	Chris Moore
Assistant Manager	David Murphy
Coach	Lee Riddell
Physio	Milan Pun

=== Directors ===
- President: Bob Fisher
- Chairman: Dave Iddiols
- CEO: Nigel Hunt
- Patron: Steve Pound
- Finance Director: Julian Lyons
- Chief Strategy Officer: Nick Rosser
- Marketing Director: Elsa Jones
- Secretary: Lee Wiles
- Board Members: Owen Lysak, Gabe Teninbaum

== Honours ==
- Spartan South Midlands League
  - Premier Division champions: 2013–14
- London Spartan League
  - Senior Division champions: 1983–84
- Middlesex County League
  - League Cup winners: 1969–70
- London Senior Cup:
  - Winners: 1991–92, 1992–93, 2024-25
- Middlesex Senior Cup:
  - Winners: 2020–21

== Records ==
- Best league performance: 8th in Southern League Premier South, 2024–25
- Best FA Cup performance: Third qualifying round, 2015–16, 2018–19, 2022–23, 2026–27
- Best FA Trophy performance: Third round, 2024–25, 2025–26
- Best FA Vase performance: Fourth round, 2013–14
- Record attendance: 1,057 vs Dover Athletic, FA Cup, October 2026
- Most appearances: Phil Player, 617
- Most goals: Keith Rowlands

== See also ==
- Hanwell Town F.C. players
