= London Colney F.C. =

Association football club in England

Coordinates: 51°43′43″N 0°18′17″W

London Colney
- Full name: London Colney Football Club
- Nickname: The Blueboys
- Founded: 1907
- Ground: Cotlandswick Park, London Colney
- Manager: Matt Day
- League: Spartan South Midlands League Division One
- 2025–26: Spartan South Midlands League Division One, 20th of 21
Home colours

London Colney Football Club is a football club based in London Colney, near St Albans, England. They are currently members of the Spartan South Midlands League Division One and play at Cotlandswick Park.

== History ==
The club was established in 1907 and joined the Mid-Herts League. In 1955 they moved up to Division One A of the Hertfordshire Senior County League. Following a third-place finish in their first season in the division, the club were promoted to the Premier Division. They went on to win the Premier Division title in 1956–57, and after finishing as runners-up in each of the next two seasons, were champions again in 1959–60. In 1971–72, a Herts Intermediate Cup match against Leavesden Hospital on 6 November ended in a draw; the tie subsequently needed six replays before London Colney finally won 1–0 in the sixth replay on 17 December. The matches were recorded in the Guinness Book of World Records as the longest cup tie in football. The club went on to win the competition in 1974–75 and again in 1982–83.

London Colney were Premier Division runners-up again in 1985–86 and were champions the following season. They won back-to-back titles in 1988–89 and 1989–90 (a season in which they also won the Herts Senior Centenary Trophy) before moving up to Division One of the South Midlands League in 1992. The club were Division One runners-up in 1992–93 and were promoted to the Senior Division. They were Senior Division runners-up and the following season and won the Herts Charity Shield for the first time. In 1994–95 the club won the Senior Division and the Herts Senior Centenary Trophy, earning promotion to the Premier Division.

In 1997 the South Midlands League merged with the Spartan League to form the Spartan South Midlands League; London Colney were placed in the Premier Division North, and following a third-place finish in the league's inaugural season, secured a place in the Premier Division for the following season as the league underwent reorganisation. After winning the Herts Charity Shield again in 1998–99, they were Premier Division runners-up in 2000–01 and went on to win the league title and the Challenge Cup the following season. However, following a decline in form, the club finished bottom of the Premier Division in 2007–08 and were relegated to Division One.

London Colney won the Herts Senior Centenary Trophy in 2009–10 and were Division One champions in 2011–12, earning promotion to the Premier Division. They were Premier Division runners-up in 2014–15 and 2015–16 before winning the league title and the league's Challenge Trophy in 2016–17. However, the club declined the opportunity of promotion to the Isthmian League. In 2022–23 they finished bottom of the Spartan South Midlands League Premier Division and were relegated and transferred to Division One of the Combined Counties League. At the end of the following season the club were transferred to Division One of the Spartan South Midlands League.

== Ground ==
The club played at White Horse Lane until 1976, when they moved to Cotlandswick Park, which had previously been the sports ground of Marconi Instruments. A breeze block stand was built on one side the pitch after the previous stand was destroyed by vandals in 1986. The new stand was later replaced by a seated stand.

== Rivalries ==
The club has a rivalry with neighbours Colney Heath.

== Honours ==
- South Midlands League
  - Senior Division champions 1994–95
  - Spartan South Midlands League
  - Premier Division champions 2001–02, 2016–17
  - Division One champions 2011–12
  - Challenge Trophy winners 2001–02, 2016–17
- Hertfordshire Senior County League
  - Premier Division champions 1956–57, 1959–60, 1986–87, 1988–89, 1989–90
- Herts Senior Centenary Trophy
  - Winners 1989–90, 1994–95, 2009–10
- Herts Charity Shield
  - Winners 1993–94, 1998–99
- Herts Intermediate Cup
  - Winners 1974–75, 1982–83

== Records ==
- Best FA Cup performance: First qualifying round, 1996–97, 1998–99, 2000–01, 2002–03, 2009–10, 2010–11, 2014–15, 2016–17
- Best FA Vase performance: Fourth round, 1999–2000

== See also ==
- London Colney F.C. players
- London Colney F.C. managers
