= Flamstead F.C. =

Flamstead
- Full name: Flamstead F.C.
- League: Spartan South Midlands League; Division Two
- 2007–08: Spartan South Midlands League; Division Two, ?

Flamstead F.C. was a football club based in the village of Flamstead, Hertfordshire, England connected to the village Sports & Social Club. They joined the South Midlands League Division One in 1990.

For the 2006–07 season, they were members of the Spartan South Midlands League Division Two, but withdrew from the competition shortly after spanking rivals Markyate 5–0. A day to remember for all. Their final game was a bad tempered 1–3 home defeat to Padbury United in April 2007. They were not listed as a registered Football Club in the Hertfordshire FA handbook for season 2007–08 or 2008–09, and subsequently appear to have folded. However, although the club had planned to form a new football section and enter a local league for the 2009–10 season, this never came to fruition and it now appears that these plans have been shelved indefinitely.
