= New Bradwell St Peter F.C. =

Coordinates: 52°03′40″N 0°47′17″W

- Full name: New Bradwell St Peter Football Club
- Nicknames: Saint Peters, Peters, Jimmies
- Founded: 1895; 2018 (refounded)
- Ground: The Recreation Ground, New Bradwell
- Manager: Jamie Burrows
- League: Spartan South Midlands League Division One
- 2025–26: Spartan South Midlands League Division One, 7th of 21
Home colours	Away colours

New Bradwell St Peter Football Club is a football club based in New Bradwell in Milton Keynes, England. They are currently members of the Spartan South Midlands League Division One and play at the Recreation Ground.

== History ==
The club was established by 1895 by the Rev. Edmund Marshall, curate of the St James Church on Newport Road, under the name Stantonbury St James, although they were soon renamed Stantonbury St Peter. While still under the St James name, the club won the Berks & Bucks Junior Cup (in 1899–1900), and was runner-up in the Berks & Bucks Senior Cup the following season, losing 5–1 to Chesham Generals.

The club won the North Bucks & District League in 1912–13 and retained the title the following season. The club won the league again in 1938–39. In 1946 they adopted their current name after merging with New Bradwell Corinthians. The club went on to win the Leighton & District Challenge Cup in the 1949–50 season.

In 1970 New Bradwell St Peter moved up to Division One of the South Midlands League. Under the guidance of manager Brian Gibbs the club were Division One champions in the 1976–77 season, earning promotion to the Premier Division where they spent four seasons before finishing bottom of the division in 1980–81, resulting in relegation back to Division One. The club were Division One champions again in 1983–84, this time under the management of Malc Burridge, and were promoted to the Premier Division. They finished bottom of the Premier Division in 1992–93 and were relegated to the Senior Division. In 1997 the league merged with the Spartan League to form the Spartan South Midlands League, with the club placed in the Senior Division.

Under player/manager Simon Spooner New Bradwell St Peter were Senior Division champions in the league's inaugural season, earning promotion to the Premier Division. In 1999–2000 they won the Berks and Bucks Senior Trophy under the management of Andy Milne and Paul Bevis, beating Milton Keynes City 3–1 on penalties after a 1–1 draw. However, the club finished bottom of the Premier Division in 2001–02 and were relegated to Division One. In 2012–13 they finished bottom of Division One and were relegated to Division Two.

A third-place finish in Division Two in 2014–15 saw New Bradwell St Peter promoted back to Division One. However, despite finishing ninth in Division One the following season, the club were demoted back to Division Two due to their ground failing to meet the required grading. They resigned from the league at the end of the 2016–17 season after most of the committee resigned. In 2018 the name New Bradwell St Peter was resurrected when Spartan South Midlands League Division Two club Loughton Manor adopted the name and moved to the Recreation Ground.

== Ground ==
The club played at the Red Bridge field until World War II, after which they moved to the Mutual Meadow on Newport Road. They also relocated their headquarters from the Forresters Arms to the Railway Tavern. The club later relocated to the Recreation Ground on Bradwell Road in the Bradville area of Milton Keynes. Floodlights were installed in 1998.

== Honours ==
- Spartan South Midlands League
  - Senior Division champions 1997–98
- South Midlands League
  - Division One champions 1976–77, 1983–84
- North Bucks & District League
  - Champions 1912–13, 1913–14, 1938–39
- Berks & Bucks FA Senior Trophy
  - Winners 1999–2000
- Leighton and District Challenge Cup
  - Winners 1949–50

== Records ==
- Best FA Vase performance: Second qualifying round, 2015–16, 2026–27

== See also ==
- New Bradwell St Peter F.C. players
- New Bradwell St Peter F.C. managers
