= Luton Old Boys F.C. =

Association football club in England

Luton Old Boys
- Full name: Luton Old Boys Football Club
- Nicknames: LOB and Old Boys,
- Stadium: Chaul End Lane
- Manager: Stew Lucas
- League: Luton Leighton District Football League
Home colours

Luton Old Boys F.C. is a local Sunday league football club based in Luton, Bedfordshire. They currently play in the Premier Division of the Luton and Leighton District Football League.

The club is affiliated to the Bedfordshire County Football Association.

== History ==
Luton Old Boys played in the South Midlands League from 1991 to 1994, where they became runners-up in Division One and gained promotion to the Premier League. In the 1993–94 season, they took part in the FA Vase, but lost to Totternhoe 'A' 2–0 in the Extra Preliminary round. At the end of the season, Luton Old Boys left the South Midlands League, but rejoined the South Midlands League in 1996 in Division One. In the 1997–98 season they won promotion to the Premier League, but could not continue their success and were relegated back down to Division One, which was then renamed the Spartan South Midlands League Division Two. The club stayed in the division until the 2001–02 season, when they had to retire from the league. For the 2006–07 season, the club entered the North Home Counties Sunday Football League in Division Two, where they finished the season mid-table. The club stayed in the division until the 2009–10 season, when they gained promotion to Division One. In 2012-13 Luton Old Boys were Division Two Champions

== Recent history ==
2013-14 Finished 4th in Division One Top Goalscorer: Paul Ridgeway (21)

2014-15 Finished 6th in the Premier Division Top Goalscorer: Paul Ridgeway (9)

2015-16 Finished 8th in the Premier Division Top Goalscorer: Tom Denehey (5)

2016-17 Finished 3rd in the Premier Division

== Stadium ==
The club plays home games at Chaul End Lane aka "The Shed".

== Records ==
- Best FA Cup performance: never entered
- Best FA Trophy performance: never entered
- Best FA Vase performance: Extra preliminary round, 1993–94
- Top Goalscorer
  - Luke Dolan is the clubs top goal scorer having scored 51 goals in 37 games whilst the club was playing in the North Home Counties Premier Division

== Honours ==
- Spartan South Midlands League Division One
  - Champions 1997–98
  - Runners-up 1991–92
- North Home Counties Sunday Football League Division Two
  - Runners-up 2009–10
  - Winners 2012–13
