= Kent Athletic F.C. =

Association football club in England

Coordinates: 51°53′52.09″N 0°27′02.36″W

Kent Athletic
- Full name: Kent Athletic Football Club
- Founded: 1926; 100 years ago
Home colours

Kent Athletic F.C. is a football club based in Leagrave, in Luton, Bedfordshire, England. The club is affiliated to the Bedfordshire County Football Association.

== History ==
The club was formed in 1926 and joined division two of the Bedfordshire and District County League, and left at the end of the 1928–29 season when the league became the South Midlands League. During the Second World War the club managed to make it to the final of the Bedfordshire FA intermediate cup twice, in 1942–43 and 1944–45 seasons.

After the war the club returned to the South Midlands League for the 1949–50 season, starting in Division one. They were promoted to the Premier division a season later as champions of division one. They stayed in the Premier division for 11 seasons, before being relegated back to division one at the end of the 1961–62 season. Over the next 9 seasons the club spent two more seasons in the premier division, 1965–66 and 1966–67, before leaving the South Midlands League again. During those 9 seasons the club lifted the Bedfordshire FA intermediate cup in the 1962–63 season.

The club joined the South Midlands League Division One again in 1994, and were promoted as runners-up in that season to the Senior Division. When the South Midlands League merged with the Spartan League in 1997, they became founder members of the new Spartan South Midlands League Senior Division. However they could only stay in the Senior Division for one season and were relegated to Division one, now known as Division two, where they have stayed ever since. The club also had a couple of good cup runs in the 2004–05 and 2005–06 season, twice making it the final of the Bedfordshire Senior Trophy.

The 2012–13 season saw the club become champions of Division two of the Spartan South Midlands League. They left the league after winning the title again in 2015–16.

== Ground ==
The club's home ground at Kent Athletic Club closed at the end of 2015.

== Honours ==
=== League honours ===
- Spartan South Midlands Football League Division Two:
  - Winners (1): 2012–13
- South Midlands League Division One
  - Winners (1): 1950–51
  - Runners-up (2): 1964–65, 1994–95
- South Midlands League Division Two
  - Runners-up (1): 1927–28

=== Cup honours ===
- Bedfordshire Senior Trophy
  - Runners-up (2): 2004–05, 2005–06
- Bedfordshire FA intermediate cup
  - Winners (1): 1962–63
  - Runners-up (2): 1942–43, 1944–45
- Anagram Records Trophy
  - Runners-up (1): 2012–13

== Records ==
- Highest League Position:
  - 1st in Spartan South Midlands League Senior Division: 2014–15
