= Real Bedford F.C. =

Association football club in England

Coordinates: 52°07′40″N 0°24′54″W

Real Bedford
- Full name: Real Bedford Football Club
- Nickname: The Pirates
- Founded: 2002
- Ground: McMullen Park, Bedford
- Chairman: Peter McCormack
- Manager: Rob Sinclair
- League: Southern League Premier Division Central
- 2025–26: Southern League Premier Division Central, 3rd of 22
- Website: realbedford.com
Home colours	Away colours

Real Bedford Football Club is a football club in Bedford, England, established in 2002 as a merger of Bedford United and US Valerio. They are members of the Southern League Premier Division Central, the seventh tier of the English football system, and play at McMullen Park.

== History ==
=== Bedford United ===
Bedford United were established in 1957, the works team of the printing firm Diemer & Reynolds. In 1971 the club joined Division Three of the United Counties League, which was renamed Division Two the following season. They remained in Division Two until leaving the league in 1979, dropping into the Bedfordshire County League, going on to win Division One in 1979–80. In 1989 they joined Division One of the South Midlands League, becoming a member of the Senior Division following league reorganisation in 1993. In 1995–96 they finished third in the division, earning promotion to the Premier Division.

In 1997 the South Midlands League merged with the Spartan League to form the Spartan South Midlands League, with Bedford United placed in the Premier Division North. After finishing fourteenth in the division in the league's first season, they were placed in the Senior Division the following season. A third-place finish in 1999–2000 saw them promoted to the Premier Division.

=== US Valerio ===
Unione Sportiva Valerio was formed as a Sunday league club in 1985 and was named after its founder Nicola Valerio.

=== Merged club ===
The two clubs merged in 2002 to form Bedford United & Valerio, taking Bedford United's place in the Premier Division of the Spartan South Midlands League. They finished second-from-bottom of the Premier Division in 2004–05 and were relegated to Division One. In 2006 they were renamed Bedford Valerio United, before being renamed simply Bedford in 2007. In 2012–13 the club won the Bedfordshire Senior Trophy. In 2014–15 they finished third in Division One, earning promotion to the Premier Division. However, the club finished bottom of the Premier Division the following season and were relegated back to Division One.

=== Real Bedford ===
In 2022 the club was taken over by bitcoin podcaster Peter McCormack, who became chairman, having previously stated that he intended for the club to reach the Premier League. The club's name was changed to Real Bedford before the 2022–23 season, which saw them win the Bedfordshire Senior Trophy and the Division One title, earning promotion to the Premier Division.

In 2024 American cryptocurrency investors, Cameron and Tyler Winklevoss invested $4.5 million in the club. The club went on to win the Premier Division, securing a second successive promotion, this time to Division One Central of the Southern League. The following season saw them finish as champions of Division One Central, resulting in promotion to the Premier Division Central. In 2025–26 they finished third in the Premier Division Central, qualifying for the promotion play-offs. After beating Kettering Town 3–1 in the semi-finals, they lost 4–2 to Spalding United in the final. In July 2026 the club won the Bedfordshire Senior Cup, defeating Bedford Town 3–2 in the final.

== Ground ==
Bedford United initially played on a pitch at the printers' firm, before moving to the nearby village of Cople and then returning to Bedford to play at Allen Park. They subsequently played at Fairhill on Clapham Road, where the club's record attendance of 1,500 was set for a South Midlands League match against Bedford Town.

The land was later bought by Sainsbury's, and as a result Bedford United temporarily groundshared with Kempston Rovers at Hillgrounds, before moving to McMullen Park in 1996. The ground was named after Jim McMullen, one of the club's founders. When the merged club was formed, they continued to play at McMullen Park.

== Honours ==
- Southern Football League
  - Division One Central 2024–25
- Spartan South Midlands League
  - Premier Division champions 2023–24
  - Division One champions 2022–23
- Bedfordshire Senior Cup
  - Winners 2025–26
- Bedfordshire Senior Trophy
  - Winners 2012–13, 2022–23

== Records ==
- Best FA Cup performance: Third qualifying round, 2026–27
- Best FA Trophy performance: Second round, 2025–26
- Best FA Vase performance: Second round, 2006–07, 2009–10, 2023–24

== See also ==
- Real Bedford F.C. players
