= Winslow United F.C. =

Association football club in England

Winslow United
- Full name: Winslow United Football Club
- Nickname: The Ploughmen
- Founded: 1891; 135 years ago
- Ground: Elmfields Gate, Winslow
- Capacity: 2,000 (100 seated)
- Chairman: Andy Setterfield
- Manager: Alex Woodfine
- League: Southern League Division One Central
- 2025–26: 2nd (promoted via play-offs)
- Website: https://www.winslowunitedfc.co.uk/
Home colours	Away colours

Winslow United Football Club is an English association football club based in Winslow, Buckinghamshire. Founded in 1891, the club plays its home matches at Winslow Sports Club, Elmfields Gate, and is nicknamed "The Ploughmen".

Winslow United currently competes in the Southern League Division One Central, having been promoted from the Spartan South Midlands Football League Premier Division following the 2025–26 season. The club secured promotion after defeating Cockfosters 2–0 in the Premier Division play-off final on 4 May 2026."Meet the new clubs in the Southern League Division One Central". Southern Football League. 10 July 2026.

== History ==
=== Formation and early years (1891–1898) ===
Winslow United was established in 1891, initially as Winslow Town F.C., closely linked to the town's Reading Room, which promoted recreational sport during the Victorian period. The founding meeting was held at the Parish Rooms, Market Square, on 13 October 1891, chaired by Mr. Herbert Bullock.

The first officers were:

- Captain: Mr Pass
- Vice-Captain: Mr B. Sanderson
- Honorary Secretary and Treasurer: Mr W. N. Midgley

The club's first recorded match took place on 31 October 1891, when Winslow defeated Granborough 3–1 on the Flower Show Field, lent by local landowner T. P. Willis. The original team colours were dark blue and white.

The current name, Winslow United F.C., was adopted at the start of the 1895–96 season, following the merger of Winslow Town and the junior club Winslow Rovers.

Winslow became a founding member of the Buckingham & District League and later competed in regional competitions including the Aylesbury & District League and the North Bucks & District League before joining the South Midlands League in 1968.

=== South Midlands League era ===
The 1970s saw Winslow establish itself as one of the stronger clubs in regional football.

Under manager John Webster, the club won the South Midlands League Division One title in 1974–75, recording 24 wins from 34 league matches. The following season Winslow finished runners-up in the South Midlands League Premier Division.

The club remained in the Premier Division for much of the remainder of the 1970s and 1980s.

In the 1983–84 season, Winslow reached the Second Round Proper of the FA Vase. The club defeated Ware and Royston Town before losing to Tiptree United. This remained one of the club's best performances in a national cup competition.

=== Decline and rebuilding ===
Winslow experienced a difficult period during the late 1980s and early 1990s. The club finished bottom of the South Midlands League Premier Division in 1990–91 and was relegated at the end of the following season.

Following changes to the structure of non-League football, Winslow competed in the Spartan South Midlands Football League and its predecessor competitions.

The club subsequently experienced a number of difficult seasons, including a 1998–99 campaign in which it finished 21st of 22 clubs in the Spartan South Midlands League Senior Division.

Winslow returned to more competitive form during the early 2000s, including a second-place finish in the Spartan South Midlands League Division Two in 2003–04.

=== Withdrawal from senior football ===
At the end of the 2008–09 season, senior football was temporarily withdrawn as the club concentrated on developing its youth structure through Winslow United Juniors.

The club's senior side returned for the 2010–11 season, entering the Spartan South Midlands League Division Two.

Winslow subsequently rebuilt its senior structure while maintaining links with its youth teams.

=== Return to the upper levels of the Spartan South Midlands League ===
Winslow recorded a series of strong finishes during the late 2010s.

The club finished third in the Spartan South Midlands League Division One in both 2017–18 and 2018–19. The 2017–18 campaign saw Winslow score 127 league goals.

The 2019–20 and 2020–21 seasons were both abandoned due to COVID before completion, with Winslow occupying competitive positions in the league at the time of abandonment.

Winslow again finished third in Division One in 2021–22, recording 25 wins and 104 goals.

=== Modern Rise and Historic promotion ===
In 2023–24, Winslow United finished third in the Spartan South Midlands League Division One and won the promotion play-off final against Northampton Sileby Rangers, earning promotion to Step 5 of the English football pyramid and returning to the Spartan South Midlands League Premier Division for the first time in 32 years.

The club continued to progress during the 2024–25 season, finishing tenth in the Spartan South Midlands League Premier Division and matching its historic FA Vase achievement by reaching the Second Round Proper for the first time since 1983–84.

The 2025–26 season became the defining moment of Winslow United's modern history. Under the leadership of manager Alex Woodfine, assisted by Rory Williams, Winslow United produced one of the greatest league seasons in the club's history, finishing second with a record of:

Position	Played	Won	Drawn	Lost	Goals For	Goals Against	Goal Difference	Points
2nd	38	27	3	8	103	49	+54	84

This secured Winslow a place in the promotion play-offs.

Goals from Charlie Attwell and Aaron King secured a landmark 2-0 victory over Cockfosters F.C., in front of a record-breaking crowd of 1,008 supporters at Elmfields Gate.

The promotion represented Winslow United's first entry into Step 4 of the English football league system. The Southern Football League subsequently confirmed Winslow as one of the new clubs entering Division One Central for the 2026–27 season."Meet the new clubs in the Southern League Division One Central". Southern Football League. 10 July 2026.

== Crest and colours ==
The Winslow United crest represents the heritage and identity of the club, featuring a crown above a football, symbolising both the town of Winslow and the club's sporting tradition.

Winslow United's traditional home colours are yellow shirts, blue shorts, and blue socks. The distinctive yellow and blue colour scheme has become synonymous with The Ploughmen and is worn across senior football, youth teams, and official club merchandise.

Historical records show that when the club was originally formed as Winslow Town in 1891, the team colours were dark blue and white. The current yellow and blue identity was adopted later and has become a defining symbol of the club.

The club's away kits have varied throughout its history, incorporating combinations of blue, white, black, and orange depending on competition requirements. However, yellow and blue remain the colours most closely associated with Winslow United.

== Ground ==
Winslow United play their home matches at Winslow Sports Club, Elmfields Gate, Winslow, Buckinghamshire (MK18 3JA). The ground, commonly known as "Winslow Football Club", has a capacity of approximately 2,000 spectators, including 100 seated places.

Elmfields Gate is more than a football ground; it represents the heart of the club and the wider sporting community in Winslow. The venue hosts senior football, youth football, disability football, cricket, and community sporting activities throughout the year.

The site has a long historical connection with the town. Originally known as Mill Close during the medieval period, the land later became associated with Bell Close before developing into the modern recreation ground.

During the Second World War, parts of the land were used for agricultural purposes. Following the war, increasing demand for community recreation facilities led to the establishment of Winslow Recreation Ground, which has continued to serve local sporting organisations ever since.

The development of Elmfields Gate reflects Winslow United's philosophy: a football club rooted in its community, built around generations of players, families, volunteers, and supporters.

=== Winslow Sports Club / Recreation Ground Timeline ===
14th century: Area known as Mill Close; pasture and site of Winslow's original windmill

16th–17th centuries: Renamed Bell Close/Bell Closes; ownership recorded in manor documents

1767: Winslow Enclosure Award reorganised ownership of the land

19th century: Bell Close name gradually shifted towards the current recreation ground area

1947–1948: Parish Council purchased the land for community recreation

1949: Winslow Recreation Ground officially established

1950s–1960s: Elmfields Gate developed; sporting use expanded

Present day: Home of Winslow United FC and a central community sporting hub

== Honours ==
Spartan South Midlands League

- Premier Division Play-off Winners: 2025–26
- Division One Play-off Winners: 2023–24
- Division One Champions: 1974–75
- Premier Division Runners-up: 1975–76
- Division Two Runners-up: 2003–04
- Division Two Cup Winners: 2010–11

North Bucks & District Football League

- Champions: 1965–66
- Runners-up: 1963–64, 1964–65

Cup Competitions

- North Bucks & District Charity Cup Winners: 1965–66, 1966–67
- North Bucks & District League Cup Winners: 1965–66
- North Bucks & District Knock-Out Cup Winners: 1965–66
- North Bucks & District League Charity Shield Winners: 1965–66
- Buckingham Senior Charity Cup Winners: 2018–19
- Anagram Records Trophy Winners: 2004–05

== Records ==
- Highest league level achieved: Southern League Division One Central (2025–26)
- First promotion to the Southern League: 2025–26
- Best league season points total: 84 points (2025–26)
- Most goals scored in a league season: 103 goals (2025–26)
- Best FA Cup performance: Preliminary Round (2020–21)
- Best FA Vase performance: Second Round Proper (1983–84, 2025–26)
- Record attendance: 1,008 vs Cockfosters, Southern League Division One Central Promotion Play-off Final, 4 May 2026

== Past seasons ==
Season	League	P	W	D	L	GF	GA	GD	Pts	Pos
1968–69	South Midlands League Division One	24	12	3	9	53	46	+7	27	6/13
1969–70	South Midlands League Division One	30	16	4	10	69	47	+22	36	5/16
1970–71	South Midlands League Division One	30	13	4	13	49	49	0	30	8/16
1971–72	South Midlands League Division One	30	18	3	9	62	41	+21	39	5/16
1972–73	South Midlands League Division One	30	15	6	9	82	51	+31	36	6/16
1973–74	South Midlands League Division One	34	16	7	11	63	47	+16	39	8/18
1974–75	South Midlands League Division One	34	24	8	2	83	29	+54	56	1/18
1975–76	South Midlands League Premier Division	30	17	7	6	57	28	+29	41	2/16
1976–77	South Midlands League Premier Division	30	14	5	11	49	46	+3	33	7/16
1977–78	South Midlands League Premier Division	30	10	8	12	44	54	-10	28	9/16
1978–79	South Midlands League Premier Division	30	9	7	14	40	44	-4	25	11/16
1979–80	South Midlands League Premier Division	30	8	9	13	40	45	-5	25	11/16
1980–81	South Midlands League Premier Division	34	15	9	10	53	45	+8	39	7/18
1981–82	South Midlands League Premier Division	32	16	7	9	59	44	+15	39	5/17
1982–83	South Midlands League Premier Division	30	11	6	13	36	42	-6	28	10/16
1983–84	South Midlands League Premier Division	28	9	7	12	58	57	+1	25	9/15
1984–85	South Midlands League Premier Division	30	15	6	9	52	32	+20	36	5/16
1985–86	South Midlands League Premier Division	30	9	7	14	34	52	-18	34	12/16
1986–87	South Midlands League Premier Division	30	13	10	7	56	38	+18	49	5/16
1987–88	South Midlands League Premier Division	32	6	10	16	37	51	-14	28	14/17
1988–89	South Midlands League Premier Division	34	9	8	17	46	72	-26	35	13/18
1989–90	South Midlands League Premier Division	36	10	7	19	53	92	-39	37	17/19
1990–91	South Midlands League Premier Division	38	3	8	27	27	95	-68	17	20/20
1991–92	South Midlands League Premier Division	40	2	0	38	20	194	-174	6	21/21
1992–93	South Midlands League Division One	42	21	8	13	117	62	+55	71	7/22
1993–94	South Midlands League Senior Division	26	12	4	10	55	58	-3	40	7/14
1994–95	South Midlands League Senior Division	26	7	6	13	45	65	-20	27	10/14
1995–96	South Midlands League Senior Division	26	7	8	11	43	57	-14	29	8/14
1996–97	South Midlands League Senior Division	26	10	5	11	40	51	-11	35	9/14
1997–98	Spartan South Midlands League Senior Division	30	10	2	18	55	78	-23	32	11/16
1998–99	Spartan South Midlands League Senior Division	42	7	5	30	42	104	-62	26	21/22
1999–00	Spartan South Midlands League Division One	32	21	5	6	84	34	+50	68	4/17
2000–01	Spartan South Midlands League Division One	34	20	7	7	81	41	+40	64	4/18
2001–02	Spartan South Midlands League Division One	38	7	3	28	30	86	-56	24	19/20
2002–03	Spartan South Midlands League Division Two	28	15	6	7	62	49	+13	51	6/15
2003–04	Spartan South Midlands League Division Two	32	23	3	6	90	43	+47	72	2/17
2004–05	Spartan South Midlands League Division One	32	17	5	10	80	56	+24	56	6/17
2005–06	Spartan South Midlands League Division One	32	9	6	17	48	73	-25	33	14/17
2006–07	Spartan South Midlands League Division One	30	5	7	18	40	76	-36	22	15/16
2007–08	Spartan South Midlands League Division One	36	8	7	21	64	107	-43	31	18/19
2008–09	Spartan South Midlands League Division One	40	16	8	16	71	88	-17	56	12/21
2010–11	Spartan South Midlands League Division Two	28	17	4	7	76	34	+42	55	4/15
2011–12	Spartan South Midlands League Division Two	26	11	8	7	59	43	+16	41	7/14
2012–13	Spartan South Midlands League Division One	40	12	7	21	65	113	-48	43	14/21
2013–14	Spartan South Midlands League Division One	38	18	5	15	85	55	+30	59	9/20
2014–15	Spartan South Midlands League Division One	40	12	10	18	54	101	-47	46	14/21
2015–16	Spartan South Midlands League Division One	38	9	7	22	51	82	-31	34	19/20
2016–17	Spartan South Midlands League Division One	40	11	5	24	53	111	-58	38	16/21
2017–18	Spartan South Midlands League Division One	38	27	2	9	127	60	+67	83	3/20
2018–19	Spartan South Midlands League Division One	38	22	8	8	113	66	+47	74	3/20
2019–20	Spartan South Midlands League Division One	27	18	1	8	81	50	+31	55	Abandoned
2020–21	Spartan South Midlands League Division One	9	4	1	4	19	17	+2	13	Abandoned
2021–22	Spartan South Midlands League Division One	38	25	5	8	104	40	+64	80	3/20
2022–23	Spartan South Midlands League Division One	38	16	6	16	70	62	+8	54	9/20
2023–24	Spartan South Midlands League Division One	38	23	7	8	85	50	+35	76	3/20 (Play-off winners)
2024–25	Spartan South Midlands League Premier Division	34	12	8	14	56	58	-2	44	10/18
2025–26	Spartan South Midlands League Premier Division	38	27	3	8	103	49	+54	84	2/20 (Play-off winners)

Season Highlights
Champions
Relegated
Play-off winners
Promotion achievement

== Community and Youth Development ==
Winslow United's identity is built around community football and player development.

The club operates one of Buckinghamshire's most active youth football programmes through Winslow United Juniors F.C., providing football opportunities from under-7s through to under-18s.

The youth structure creates a pathway for local players to progress into senior football, supporting the club's long-term ambition of developing talent from within the Winslow community.

Winslow United also operates disability football programmes, ensuring that players of all abilities have opportunities to participate in football.

The club's commitment to coaching standards, safeguarding, inclusion, and community engagement reflects its status as an FA Charter Standard Community Club.

The historic promotion achieved in 2025–26 was built on these foundations, with the success of the senior team representing the collective work of generations of players, coaches, volunteers, supporters, and families.

From its origins as a local football club founded in 1891 to its arrival in the Southern League structure in 2026, Winslow United's journey reflects resilience, ambition and identity. The Ploughmen continue to honour their heritage while building the foundations for the next chapter of the club's history.
