= Caddington F.C. =

Association football club in England

Coordinates: 51.8597°N 0.4531°W

Caddington
- Full name: Caddington Football Club
- Nickname: The Oaks
- Founded: 1973
- Ground: Manor Road, Caddington
- Chairman: Nick Archer
- Manager: Domenico Esposito & Evan Tracey
- League: Spartan South Midlands League Division Two
- 2025–26: Spartan South Midlands League Division Two, 11th of 17
Home colours

Caddington F.C. are a football club based in Caddington, near Luton, England. The club is affiliated to the Bedfordshire County Football Association and are currently members of the Spartan South Midlands League Division Two.

== History ==
The club was re-formed in 1973 after an absence of local football in the village and has been continuous since then but there had been previous Caddington teams before this time and the local history society "Caddhist" has a good selection of photos with dates of teams in the 1950s plus an Caddington All Saints Church Team photo from 1911. The earliest reference is in HM Prescott's book written in 1937 referencing John Cripps, son of the village baker, being a member of both the Caddington Football and Cricket teams in 1889. In 1982 the club moved to their current home of Caddington & District Sports & Social Club.

They joined the South Midlands League Division One in 1986. In the 1996–97 season the club came runners up in Division one but instead of being promoted to the Premier Division, they were placed in the Spartan South Midlands League Senior Division when the Spartan League merged with South Midlands League. The club remained in the Senior Division, later renamed Division one in 2000, until the 2000–01 season, when they were relegated to Division Two. The club dropped out of the South Midland League early in the 2013–14 season after being unable to field a team for two successive games, entering Division One of the West Herts League the following season. They were Division One runners-up in 2015–16, earning promotion to the Premier Division. A new team were set up, and rejoined Division Two of the Spartan South Midlands League in 2022, with the existing Saturday side switching to the Beds County league. In advance of the 2023/24 Season, all adult teams playing at the sports ground agreed to form a single club which now has teams in the Spartan South Midlands Div 2, Beds County Div 2, 2 Sunday sides in the Leighton & District League and a Vets team in the Herts Super Vets league.
