= Buckingham F.C. =

Association football club in England

Coordinates: 52.0023°N 0.9790°W

Buckingham
- Full name: Buckingham Football Club
- Founded: 2023
- Ground: Stratford Fields, Buckingham
- Chairman: Adam Bray
- Manager: Ryan Gurton
- League: Spartan South Midlands League Division One
- 2025–26: Spartan South Midlands League Division One, 10th of 21
- Website: https://www.buckinghamfc.co.uk
Home colours	Away colours

Buckingham Football Club is a football club based in Buckingham, Buckinghamshire, England. Formed by a merger of Buckingham Athletic and Buckingham United in 2023, they are currently members of the Spartan South Midlands League Division One and play at Stratford Fields.

== History ==
=== Buckingham Athletic ===
Buckingham Athletic crest

Buckingham Athletic were formed in 1933 as Buckingham Juniors, but it was three years before a ground was found, allowing the club to enter the Brackley and District League. When they got their ground it was originally called Timm's Meadow, before later becoming Stratford Fields. In 1939 the club adopted its current name. In 1960–61 they won their first trophy, the North Bucks League Shield.

In 1965 Buckingham moved up to Division One of the Hellenic League. In their first season in the league they won the Bucks Junior Cup. After finishing as runners-up in 1968–69, the club were promoted to the Premier Division. They won the Buckingham Senior Charity Cup in 1969–70, but were relegated back to Division One after finishing bottom of the Premier Division in 1971–72. They remained in Division One until dropped back into the North Bucks League in 1979. The club won the Premier Division Shield in 1983–84, and went on to win the league title the following season, not losing a match. They subsequently moved up to Division One of the South Midlands League, which they won at the first attempt. However, they were denied promotion as Stratford Fields was not up to the required grading. They finished as runners-up in 1988–89, and although they were denied promotion again, they were able to move up to the Premier Division in 1991 after winning Division One for a second time.

Buckingham remained in the Premier Division until the league merged with the Spartan League in 1997, winning the Floodlit Trophy in 1996–97. Following the merger they were placed in the Premier Division North, and a tenth-place finish in the league's first season saw them become members of the Premier Division for the 1998–99 season. However, they took voluntary relegation to Division One at the end of the season; this became Division Two in 2001. The 2002–03 season saw the club win Division Two, earning promotion to Division One. They finished as runners-up in 2004–05, but were not promoted.

=== Buckingham United ===
In 1995 the club joined Division One of the South Midlands League. After the merger with the Spartan League, they were placed in Division One North of the Spartan South Midlands League for the 1997–98 season, but resigned midway through the season. They were re-established in 2011, playing at the Lace Hill Sports Centre. The club joined the North Bucks League, winning its Division One Cup in 2017–18. In 2019 the club rejoined the Spartan South Midlands League, entering Division Two.

=== Merged club ===
In 2023 the two clubs merged to form Buckingham Football Club, which took Buckingham Athletic's place in Division One of the Spartan South Midlands League.

== Honours ==
=== Buckingham Athletic ===
- Spartan South Midlands League
  - Division Two champions 2002–03
- South Midlands League
  - Division One champions 1985–86, 1990–91
  - Floodlit Trophy winners 1996–97
- North Bucks League
  - Premier Division champions 1984–85
  - Premier Division Shield winners 1960–61, 1983–84
- Berks & Bucks Intermediate Cup
  - Winners 2002–03, 2003–04
- Berks & Bucks Junior Cup
  - Winners 1965–66, 2010–11
- Buckingham Senior Charity Cup
  - Winners 1969–70, 1971–72, 2014–15
- Stantonbury Charity Cup
  - Winners 1995–96, 1996–97
- Challenge Trophy
  - Winners 1996–97

=== Buckingham United ===
- North Bucks League
  - Division One Cup winners 2017–18

== Records ==
- Best FA Vase performance: Second qualifying round, 2024–25
