= Potters Bar Town F.C. =

English football club

Coordinates: 51°41′46″N 0°10′39″W

Potters Bar Town
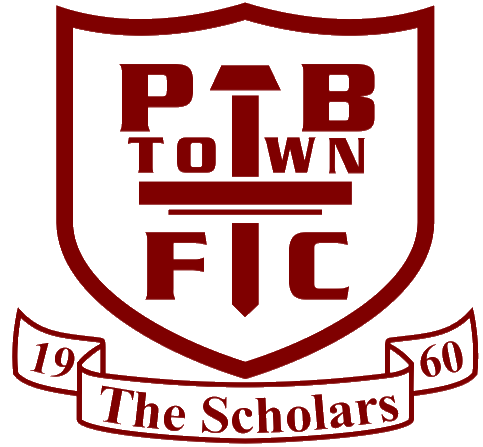
- Full name: Potters Bar Town Football Club
- Nicknames: The Scholars, Bar
- Founded: 1960
- Ground: The Lantern Community Stadium, Potters Bar
- Capacity: 2,500
- Chairman: Peter Waller
- Manager: Jimmy Martin
- League: Southern League Division One Central
- 2025–26: Isthmian League Premier Division, 21st of 22 (relegated)
- Website: pitchero.com/pottersbartownfc
Home colours	Away colours

Potters Bar Town Football Club is an English football club based in Potters Bar, Hertfordshire, England. They were formed in 1960 as Mount Grace Old Scholars, and, after dropping 'Old Scholars' from the name in 1984, changed to their present name in 1991. Their best performances in the FA Cup were in the 2006–07, 2016–17 and 2019–20 seasons when they reached the 4th (and final) Qualifying Round. They currently play in the Southern League Division One Central.

When Potters Bar built their turnstile block, to join the Southern League in 2005, their turnstiles came from the old Wembley Stadium. The club are currently managed by Jimmy Martin, and finished in 14th place in the Isthmian Premier Division in the 2024/25 season.

== Club history ==
=== 1960s ===
In 1960, Ken Barrett, who was a PE Master at Mount Grace School at the time, formed a football club for former scholars. The club played in Division One of the Barnet & District League in their first season, 1960–61. In May 1965 the Barnet & District League and the Finchley & District League merged to form the North London Combination, in which the club then played, winning the Premier Division championship in 1967–68. The club joined Division Two of the Hertfordshire County League the following season and won the championship and promotion to Division One at the first attempt.

=== 1970s ===
Mount Grace Old Scholars won the championship of Division One of the Hertfordshire County League and promotion to the Premier Division in the 1973–74 season. They finished bottom and were relegated back to Division One in the 1978–79 season.

=== 1980s ===
Following two third-place finishes, the club won the Division One championship and renewed promotion to the Premier Division in the 1981–82 season. The club spent the rest of the 1980s in this division.

=== 1990s ===
In the 1990–91 season, the club reached the third round of the FA Vase, and won the Hertfordshire Senior County League, as it was by then called, Premier Division championship and the Aubrey Cup. The change of name to Potters Bar Town coincided with joining the South Midlands League Premier Division. In the 1996–97 season, the club won the championship on goal difference. In the following season, 1997–98, the club were runners-up in the Spartan South Midlands League Premier Division North, and reached the quarter-finals of the FA Vase.

=== Recent history ===
Under Steve Smart and assistant Paul Surridge, the club won the Spartan South Midlands League Premier Division Cup, the Hertfordshire Charity Shield, the Potters Bar Charity Cup, and the Spartan South Midlands League Premier Division Championship, thus winning promotion to Division One East of the Southern League, in the 2004–05 season. After one season, the club moved sidewards to the Isthmian League Division One North.In the 2024/25 season Leigh Rose became the assistant manager as a ACL injury was picked up in pre season and Nick Mountford has been the first team coach since the 2022/23 season and is currently still there.

Andy Leese and assistant Jon Meakes joined Potters Bar Town in February 2006 and steered the club away from relegation and in the 2006–07 season they then guided Town to a modest 14th in the league. The Scholars also captured the Herts Charity Cup in 2007. However Leese and Jon Meakes resigned from The Scholars to take over the job at Chesham United. Steve Browne, previously manager at Aveley, Boreham Wood, Dover Athletic and Slough Town left in December 2008 and the new manager is Adam Lee, formerly, manager of Wingate & Finchley. The club was placed back in the Southern League (Division One Central) for the 2013/14 season. Adam Lee resigned in October 2013 and was replaced by player-manager Jack Friend.

Friend departed himself in February 2015, and was replaced by ex Hillingdon Borough and North Greenford United boss Steve Ringrose.

Potters Bar got promoted from the Bostik League Division One North to the Bostik Premier League in the 2017–18 season by finishing second. They secured promotion with a 3–0 win against Barking.

In the 2019–20 season the club were drawn against Barnet in the FA Cup qualifying fourth round. The BBC selected the game to live-stream on their services making this the first full live game in Potters Bar history. The game finished 1–1 with the Scholars scoring in the 101st minute of injury time to force a replay. However at The Hive they lost 3–1.

The 2025–26 season saw the club relegated to step 4 following seven years in step 3.

== Ground ==
The club play at the Lantern Stadium, which was also used for many years by Arsenal Ladies Reserves and by the first team for county cup ties. In 2006, in the space of just six weeks, a new perimeter fence was erected, major improvements were made to the stand and changing rooms, and turnstiles and an outside toilet block were added to the facilities to satisfy the Football Association's ground grading standards and allow the club to be promoted to the Southern League Division One East.

The ground can be found on Watkins Rise, which is a small road that is connected to The Walk. The Hertfordshire-based club have the postcode EN6 1DP.

The club were given a grant by Hertsmere Borough Council to upgrade the Lantern Community Stadium in 2024, which saw the club switch to a 3G surface, as well as adding a new stand at the Walk End. The Scholars will return to Potters Bar in the 2025/26 season.

Two new stands were built in the 2018–19 season with capacity for 100 seats and 100 people standing following promotion to Step 3.

The current record attendance for the ground is 2,011 set on 19 October 2019 in the FA Cup preliminary round four against Barnet.

== County affiliation ==
When the club was founded, the town of Potters Bar was within the county of Middlesex. It transferred to Hertfordshire in 1965 following local government boundary changes. The club remains affiliated to both the Middlesex County Football Association and the Hertfordshire County Football Association, and participates in the Hertfordshire Senior Cup and Charity Cup.

== Records ==
- Best FA Cup performance: Fourth qualifying round, 2006–07, 2016–17, 2019–20
- Best FA Trophy performance: Third qualifying round, 2025–26
- Best FA Vase performance: Sixth round, 1997–98
- Record attendance: 2,011 vs Barnet, FA Cup fourth qualifying round, 19 October 2019

== Honours ==
- Spartan South Midlands League
  - Premier Division champions: 1996–97, 2004–05
  - Premier Division League Cup winners: 1997, 2005
  - Floodlit Cup winners 1998, 2006
- Herts Senior County League
  - Premier Division champions: 1990–91
- Herts Charity Shield
  - Winners: 2003, 2005, 2007
- Potters Bar Charity Cup
  - Winners: 1996, 2004, 2005
- Aubrey Cup
  - Winners: 1991
- North London Combination
  - Premier Division champions: 1967–68
- Isthmian League Division One North
  - Runners-up: 2017–18
