= Welwyn Garden City F.C. =

English football club

Coordinates: 51°48′22″N 0°10′43″W

Welwyn Garden City
- Full name: Welwyn Garden City Football Club
- Nickname: The Citizens
- Founded: 1921
- Ground: Herns Way; Welwyn Garden City; Hertfordshire
- Capacity: 3,000
- Chairman: David Coates
- Manager: Gavin Kelsey
- League: Southern League Division One Central
- 2025–26: Southern League Division One Central, 8th of 22
- Website: https://www.welwyngardencityfc.org.uk/
Home colours	Away colours

Welwyn Garden City Football Club is a football club based in Welwyn Garden City, Hertfordshire. They currently play in the Southern League Division One Central.

== History ==
=== 1921 to 1979 ===
Founded in 1921, the club began by playing friendlies before entering the Mid-Hertfordshire League (Division 2) for the 1922–23 season. In 1926, the club changed leagues to the Bedfordshire & District County League for one season. A year later, they joined the Spartan League where they stayed until the end of the 1934–35 season. The 1926 season was the first time that the club entered into the FA Amateur Cup. The club first entered the FA Challenge Cup in the 1927/28 season, losing 7–4 away to Hampstead in the 1st qualifying round (NB the FA Archive erroneously states that the club entered the FA Cup in the 1922/23 season, however, this was in fact Welwyn FC. The FA has been informed). In the 1927–28 campaign, the club won its first-ever silverware, winning the Hertfordshire FA Charity Shield, beating Hoddesdon Town 5–2.

The club had a very successful 1934–35 season, where they reached its highest ever league position. However, Welwyn were forced to resign from the Spartan League as the club couldn't find a suitable ground on which to play. With problems collecting money at the venue, they were wound up before the start of the 1935–36 season with debts of over £20.

In 1937, rivals Shredded Wheat FC was wound up which allowed Welwyn Garden City with a grant of £50 from the Shredded Wheat company to be re-established. They then entered the Spartan League for the 1937–38 season. Due to the Second World War, the Spartan League was suspended, with the club only playing one league game and an FA Cup tie (that competition was also suspended). For the remainder of the 1939/40 season, the club competed in the East, North & Mid-Hertfordshire Combination and then the Hertfordshire & Bedfordshire Combination. At a meeting held in August 1940, it was agreed "to carry on the club with the present committee".

The club returned to league competition in the 1944–45 season to compete in the Mid-Hertfordshire League. The 1945–46 season saw the club return to the Spartan League, where they remained until joining the London League for the 1950–51 season. Their brief stay in the London League lasted until 1955 and during that time they enjoyed their best run in the FA Amateur Cup by reaching the 3rd round qualifying. The club rejoined the Spartan League in 1955, where they stayed until 1959. During this period, the club was managed by former England goalkeeper international Harry Hibbs.

The next stop was county football with a move to the Herts County League in 1959.

In 1968, the club moved to its present home, Herns Way, with their first fixture at senior level against Knebworth in the Aubrey Cup, on 16 November that year.

In 1970, the club joined the Greater London League and the following season was a founder member of the Metropolitan London League, where it remained for two seasons before joining the South Midlands League. In the 1972–73 season, after a merger with Welwyn Garden United to form Welwyn Garden FC, they won the Premier Division championship at the first attempt under the guidance of former Scottish international Alex Massie. The following season they reached the final of the League Challenge Trophy, only to be beaten by Barton Rovers, 3–1 on aggregate.

1976–77 saw the club lose their top-flight status, and there began a five-year battle to reclaim it. During these First Division years the club was to finish no lower than 5th and in 1981–82, won the league and with it a return to the Premier Division.

In the championship year, the club also reached the final of the League Challenge Trophy, but once again had to settle for runners-up, this time losing 3–0 on aggregate to Stotfold.

=== 1980s to 1999 ===
In the 1984–85 season, under the guidance of John Sneddon as manager, the club had success lifting the first ever Hertfordshire FA Senior Centenary Trophy beating Pirton 2–0. Sneddon decided to leave the club at the end of that season and former Sudbury Court manager Ray Sullivan took over the role. In the 1985–86 season, Welwyn finished second in the table missing out on the title.

In the 1986–87 and 1987–88 seasons, the club lifted the Herts FA Charity Shield, making them only the sixth team to retain the Shield. The close of the 1986–87 season also saw floodlights installed at the Herns Way ground.

The 1988–89 season saw Welwyn finish in the top six of the league, with an appearance in two cup-finals, the League Challenge Trophy and the Hertfordshire FA Senior Centenary Trophy. However, these were both lost in the space of five days.

The 1990–91 season saw Ray Sullivan step down and so began a lean spell during which the Club tried several combinations, amongst those being Dave Lawrence, Jock Bruce, former player Pat Maslen and Ian Priest. During these years the closest the Club came to anything was another Hertfordshire FA Charity Shield final appearance, during Pat Maslen's reign. However, the trophy slipped through their fingers when losing out to Sawbridgeworth Town on penalties after a 2–2 draw.

In 1996–97, City looked to local man Malcolm Doctor, who the previous year had guided City's archrivals Hatfield Town to second place in the South Midlands League. Everyone at the club was optimistic about further glory days returning to Herns Way. Four cup-finals were reached, the League Challenge Trophy, the Hertfordshire FA Charity Shield, the Southern Combination Cup and the O’Brien Challenge Trophy but all four were lost. However, there was some consolation with the Reserve team winning the Southern Combination Reserve Challenge Cup.

The 1997/98 season saw the formation of the Spartan South Midlands League, with the club joining the Premier Division North, finishing high enough (6th) to qualify for the Premier Division the following season.

In 1998, upon the departure of Malcolm Doctor, the Citizens forged a link with near neighbours, Stevenage Borough FC and strengthened their squad with Boro's EFCO youngsters along with the management pairing of Dave Bullock and Bill Bannister. However, despite reaching the third qualifying round of the FA Cup for the first time the season collapsed midway through and with the break-up of the squad and a battle with relegation followed.

=== 1999 to present ===
The 1999–00 season marked the beginning of a rebuilding process, with former Somersett Ambury V&E manager Dave Steadman appointed to lead the Citizens into the new millennium. However, the club's decline continued, and in 2001–02 they were relegated to the First Division, ending one of the longest uninterrupted spells in the Premier Division.

Guillermo Ganet was appointed manager in 2002 with the task of restoring the glory days back to the club and following two seasons steered the club return in the Premier Division. The club's first season return in the top flight saw them finish in a very creditable eighth place, however, the end of that campaign saw the manager and most of the playing squad depart for Berkhamsted Town.

Howard Cowley was given his chance as manager in 2005–06; he brought about a wealth of experience from not only the South Midlands League but in all divisions of the Isthmian League. During his tenure the club had an excellent 19 game unbeaten run in all competitions and also equalled their best ever FA Cup run when losing narrowly away 2–1 to the then Conference South leaders Histon in the 3rd qualifying round. The club also exceeded its best-ever run in the FA Vase by reaching the 5th round only for an administrative error to deny them the chance to go even further. Players Joe Devera, Nick Brindley and Harry Hunt were offered contracts with Barnet FC and the season's top scorer, Bradley Woods-Garness, went to Conference side Farnborough Town. 2006–07 saw the club achieve fourth spot in the league, becoming the only side to beat eventual League and Cup champions Edgware Town at their White Lion ground whilst doing the double over local rivals Hertford Town with two fine victories.

Following the departure of Howard Cowley, a succession of managers tried to revive the fortunes of the club however this quick turnover of managers did nothing to ensure success, in fact, it had the opposite effect with return through relegation in the First Division at the end of the 2009–10 campaign. A feature of that season was the 'A' Team winning the North & Mid-Hertfordshire league, managed by Simon Braine.

2010–11 saw the club's poor form continue. This was not helped by having three managers in the season, Phil Read, Rob Pattwell and Simon Braine. The latter, with the help of Assistant Manager Adam Fisher, helped to steer the club away from potentially ruinous relegation.

2011–12 saw Simon working alongside Charlie Marshall although the partnership was to last just twelve months.

The following season the club then turned to former players Scott O'Donoghue and Pablo Ardiles to try and take the Citizens back into the top flight. Scott and Pablo left the club after one season in charge.

In 2013–14, Welwyn Garden City found their feet again under newly appointed Manager Adam Fisher, with a respectable league campaign, finishing 4th.

2014–15 saw the Citizens shine, with impressive runs in the FA Cup and FA Vase. A feature of the season was Jason Caswell's 51 goals, a new club record, on the way to the club's first ever cup and league 'Double' of the First Division Championship and Division 1 Cup. Promotion was achieved for the first time in five years with a season record of W29 D5 L6.

The 2015/16 season saw the club winning the League Challenge Trophy for the first time. They also lost in the final of the Dudley Latham Memorial (Premier Division) Cup. The following season (2016–17) was one of consolidation on and off the pitch as extensive ground improvements were completed.

The 2017/18 season was one of the most successful in the club's history. During the campaign, the team established club records for the longest unbeaten runs in all competitions (25 matches) and in league competition (18 matches). On 12 November 2017, former Tottenham Hotspur Ambassador and FIFA World Cup winner Osvaldo Ardiles officially unveiled stadium upgrades funded in part by a Premier League grant, including two turnstiles donated by Tottenham Hotspur from the former White Hart Lane stadium. The club won the league championship for the first time since the merger of the Spartan League and South Midlands League, securing only its second title at the level. Although the season also included defeats in the finals of the Hertfordshire FA Charity Shield and the Dudley Latham Memorial (Premier Division) Cup, these setbacks were outweighed by the club's promotion to Level 4 of the Southern League system, marking the highest level reached in its history at the time.

The 2018/19 league season began well but exits from the FA Cup and FA Trophy at the first hurdle were disappointing. Crisis struck in January when manager Adam Fisher was suddenly dismissed. This led to an immediate walkout of almost the entire squad and backroom staff. Only players Jonny Sexton, Jay Rolfe and David Keenleyside remained for the rest of the season. Thanks to quick action by the club's football committee, Fisher was quickly replaced by Dean Barker who worked tirelessly to put together a backroom team and a playing squad at extremely short notice. Having been given the job on the Thursday there was not enough time to have a team ready for the home tie with eventual league champions Peterborough Sports the following Saturday, for which the club was later fined. The next fixture was three days later but the battling draw against Aylesbury United by the hastily put together team was later cancelled out when the club was fined and deducted the hard-won point by the league for playing an ineligible player (the club played three work experience players when the limit is two). Four draws and eight defeats in Barker's first twelve games in charge saw the team drawn into the battle to avoid relegation. However, a rally of three wins – two of which were away from home - and a draw in the final five games ensured survival with a game to spare and ensured a comfortable 14th-place finish.

Barker was given the manager's job on a permanent basis shortly after the end of the season and he spoke with optimism about his plans for the future. However, a few days afterwards the ambitious Barker accepted the manager's job at Step 3 club Kings Langley. The club then appointed Nick Ironton as his replacement. Whilst not enjoying any notable cup success, Ironton's team was challenging strongly for a play-off place when the 2019–20 season was declared null and void due to COVID-19.

Again, the COVID-19 pandemic was responsible for the 2020–21 season being curtailed in March 2021. The club had played only six league matches when the decision was made, but an excellent run to the third round proper of the FA Trophy — the furthest the club has reached in three attempts so far — provided a small consolation.

== Staff ==
=== Staff and directors ===
Welwyn Garden City F.C. uses a system where club members elect other members into the following positions. These elections take place every August.

As of 10 January 2023.

Position	Name
Chairman	(England) David Coates
Secretary	(England) Gavin Meaden
Secretary	(England)
Secretary	(England) Phil Ravitz
Treasurer	(England) Leigh Corbit

=== Coaching staff ===
https://www.welwyngardencityfc.org.uk/teams/first-team

Position	Name
Manager	(England) Gavin Kelsey
First team Coach	(England) Glenn Draper

== Records ==
- Best FA Cup performance: Third qualifying round replay (1998–99)
- Best FA Trophy performance: Third round (2020–21)
- Best FA Vase performance: Fourth round replay (2005–06)

== Honours ==
- Spartan South Midlands League
  - Premier Division champions 2017–18
  - Division One champions 2014–15
  - Challenge Trophy winners 2015–16
  - Division One Cup winners 2014–15
- South Midlands League
  - Premier Division champions 1972–73
- Hertfordshire Charity Shield
  - Winners 1927–28, 1986–87, 1987–88
- Hertfordshire Senior Centenary Trophy
  - Winners 1984–85
