= 2004–05 Spartan South Midlands Football League =

The 2004–05 Spartan South Midlands Football League season is the 8th in the history of Spartan South Midlands Football League a football competition in England.

== Premier Division ==
Spartan South Midlands Football League Premier Division
- Season: 2004–05
- Champions: Potters Bar Town
- Promoted: Potters Bar Town
- Relegated: Bedford United & Valerio; Hoddesdon Town
- Matches: 380
- Goals: 1,194 (3.14 per match)

The Premier Division featured 16 clubs which competed in the division last season, along with four clubs, promoted from Division One:

- Haywood United
- Langford
- Tring Athletic
- Welwyn Garden City

=== League table ===
Pos	Team	Pld	W	D	L	GF	GA	GD	Pts	Promotion or relegation
1	Potters Bar Town	38	29	5	4	95	32	+63	92	Promoted to the Southern Football League
2	Hanwell Town	38	22	10	6	91	52	+39	76	
3	Haywood United	38	19	10	9	72	48	+24	67	
4	Tring Athletic	38	18	11	9	53	43	+10	65	
5	Harefield United	38	15	17	6	48	33	+15	62	
6	Hillingdon Borough	38	18	6	14	76	55	+21	60	
7	St Margaretsbury	38	15	11	12	65	49	+16	56	
8	Welwyn Garden City	38	16	8	14	61	52	+9	56	
9	Broxbourne Borough V&E	38	15	9	14	64	63	+1	54	
10	Biggleswade Town	38	15	5	18	61	72	−11	50	
11	London Colney	38	14	8	16	56	67	−11	50	
12	Ruislip Manor	38	13	10	15	54	61	−7	49	
13	Holmer Green	38	14	7	17	47	58	−11	49	
14	Leverstock Green	38	10	15	13	62	61	+1	45	
15	Harpenden Town	38	11	11	16	43	60	−17	44	
16	Royston Town	38	10	11	17	55	76	−21	41	
17	Langford	38	11	6	21	56	82	−26	39	
18	Haringey Borough	38	10	6	22	43	72	−29	36	
19	Bedford United & Valerio	38	7	10	21	43	77	−34	31	Relegated to Division One
20	Hoddesdon Town	38	7	6	25	49	81	−32	27	Relegated to Division One

Source: fchd
Rules for classification: 1) points; 2) goal difference; 3) number of goals scored.

== Division One ==
Spartan South Midlands Football League Division One
- Season: 2004–05
- Champions: Oxhey Jets
- Promoted: Biggleswade United; Oxhey Jets
- Matches: 272
- Goals: 1,057 (3.89 per match)

Division One featured eleven clubs which competed in the division last season, along with six new clubs.

- Five clubs, promoted from Division Two:
  - Amersham Town
  - Arlesey Athletic
  - Cranfield United
  - Kentish Town
  - Winslow United
- One club, joined from the Herts County League:
  - Oxhey Jets

=== League table ===
Pos	Team	Pld	W	D	L	GF	GA	GD	Pts	Promotion
1	Oxhey Jets	32	25	4	3	101	28	+73	79	Promoted to the Premier Division
2	Buckingham Athletic	32	23	3	6	65	28	+37	72	
3	Biggleswade United	32	22	3	7	110	41	+69	69	Promoted to the Premier Division
4	New Bradwell St Peter	32	22	3	7	72	56	+16	69	
5	Colney Heath	32	18	9	5	72	40	+32	63	
6	Winslow United	32	17	5	10	80	56	+24	56	
7	Brache Sparta	32	16	5	11	68	53	+15	53	
8	Cockfosters	32	16	4	12	60	53	+7	52	
9	Kentish Town	32	12	6	14	52	58	−6	42	
10	Arlesey Athletic	32	11	5	16	53	63	−10	38	
11	Brimsdown Rovers	32	11	3	18	48	63	−15	36	
12	Stony Stratford Town	32	10	6	16	51	76	−25	36	
13	Sun Postal Sports	32	8	3	21	46	79	−33	27	
14	Shillington	32	6	7	19	52	84	−32	25	Resigned from the league
15	Cranfield United	32	5	9	18	54	87	−33	24	
16	Amersham Town	32	7	2	23	37	98	−61	23	
17	Ampthill Town	32	2	5	25	36	94	−58	11	

Source: fchd
Rules for classification: 1) points; 2) goal difference; 3) number of goals scored.

== Division Two ==
Spartan South Midlands Football League Division Two
- Season: 2004–05
- Champions: Crawley Green
- Promoted: Dunstable Town 98
- Matches: 240
- Goals: 927 (3.86 per match)

Division Two featured twelve clubs which competed in the division last season, along with four new clubs:

- Dunstable Town 98, new club
- Kings Langley, relegated from Division One
- Pitstone & Ivinghoe United, relegated from Division One
- The 61, relegated from Division One

Also, Old Dunstablians changed name to AFC Dunstable and Abbey National changed name to Loughton Orient.

=== League table ===
Pos	Team	Pld	W	D	L	GF	GA	GD	Pts	Promotion
1	Crawley Green	30	23	3	4	107	38	+69	72	
2	Dunstable Town 98	30	19	7	4	89	40	+49	64	Promoted to Division One
3	Totternhoe	30	19	6	5	79	45	+34	63	
4	Risborough Rangers	30	18	8	4	63	33	+30	62	
5	Padbury B T F C	30	15	7	8	65	46	+19	52	
6	AFC Dunstable	30	12	10	8	68	54	+14	46	
7	Pitstone & Ivinghoe United	30	12	9	9	63	62	+1	45	
8	Kent Athletic	30	10	8	12	42	48	−6	38	
9	Caddington	30	11	5	14	47	71	−24	38	
10	Kings Langley	30	9	7	14	49	61	−12	34	
11	Mursley United	30	8	8	14	47	62	−15	32	
12	Flamstead	30	8	7	15	54	71	−17	31	
13	Loughton Orient	30	8	6	16	46	71	−25	30	
14	The 61	30	7	7	16	38	52	−14	28	
15	Old Bradwell United	30	3	10	17	36	67	−31	19	
16	Markyate	30	2	4	24	34	106	−72	10	

Source: fchd
Rules for classification: 1) points; 2) goal difference; 3) number of goals scored.
