= 2006–07 Spartan South Midlands Football League =

The 2006–07 Spartan South Midlands Football League season is the 10th in the history of Spartan South Midlands Football League a football competition in England.

== Premier Division ==
Spartan South Midlands Football League Premier Division
- Season: 2006–07
- Champions: Edgware Town
- Promoted: Edgware Town
- Relegated: Royston Town; Haringey Borough
- Matches: 420
- Goals: 1,507 (3.59 per match)

The Premier Division featured 16 clubs which competed in the division last season, along with five new clubs.

- Four clubs, transferred from disbanded Isthmian League Division Two:
  - Chalfont St Peter
  - Edgware Town
  - Hertford Town
  - Kingsbury Town
- Plus:
  - Colney Heath, promoted from Division One

Also, Kingsbury Town merged with London Tigers and formed Kingsbury London Tigers.

=== League table ===
Pos	Team	Pld	W	D	L	GF	GA	GD	Pts	Promotion or relegation
1	Edgware Town	40	32	6	2	118	35	+83	102	Promoted to the Isthmian League Division One North
2	Harefield United	40	29	5	6	95	35	+60	92	
3	Hertford Town	40	26	8	6	122	50	+72	86	
4	Welwyn Garden City	40	22	9	9	90	53	+37	75	
5	Leverstock Green	40	20	8	12	73	66	+7	68	
6	Chalfont St Peter	40	19	10	11	79	50	+29	67	
7	Oxhey Jets	40	20	7	13	73	56	+17	67	
8	Broxbourne Borough V&E	40	17	11	12	86	64	+22	62	
9	Aylesbury Vale	40	15	8	17	71	75	−4	53	
10	London Colney	40	13	10	17	58	72	−14	49	
11	Tring Athletic	40	14	7	19	53	81	−28	49	
12	Ruislip Manor	40	14	6	20	71	81	−10	48	
13	Kingsbury London Tigers	40	14	5	21	64	69	−5	47	
14	Biggleswade United	40	11	11	18	68	89	−21	44	
15	St Margaretsbury	40	10	10	20	52	64	−12	40	
16	Colney Heath	40	11	7	22	51	85	−34	40	
17	Langford	40	11	7	22	69	107	−38	40	
18	Biggleswade Town	40	11	6	23	47	73	−26	39	
19	Holmer Green	40	9	9	22	49	91	−42	36	
20	Royston Town	40	9	9	22	59	117	−58	36	Relegated to Division One
21	Haringey Borough	40	8	11	21	59	94	−35	35	Relegated to Division One

Source: fchd
Rules for classification: 1) points; 2) goal difference; 3) number of goals scored.

== Division One ==
Spartan South Midlands Football League Division One
- Season: 2006–07
- Champions: Brimsdown Rovers
- Promoted: Brimsdown Rovers; Cockfosters
- Matches: 240
- Goals: 910 (3.79 per match)

Division One featured 16 clubs which competed in the division last season, along with one new club:

- Harpenden Town, relegated from the Premier Division

Also, Bedford United & Valerio changed name to Bedford Valerio United.

=== League table ===
Pos	Team	Pld	W	D	L	GF	GA	GD	Pts	Promotion
1	Brimsdown Rovers	30	25	4	1	109	15	+94	79	Promoted to the Premier Division
2	Cockfosters	30	22	2	6	62	25	+37	68	Promoted to the Premier Division
3	Stony Stratford Town	30	22	2	6	67	33	+34	68	
4	Ampthill Town	30	21	4	5	76	33	+43	67	
5	Hoddesdon Town	30	16	4	10	55	38	+17	52	
6	Kentish Town	30	15	6	9	65	45	+20	51	
7	Brache Sparta	30	14	5	11	61	49	+12	47	
8	Buckingham Athletic	30	11	6	13	60	57	+3	39	
9	Amersham Town	30	10	3	17	49	61	−12	33	
10	Bedford Valerio United	30	9	5	16	53	86	−33	32	
11	Arlesey Athletic	30	9	4	17	50	82	−32	31	
12	Harpenden Town	30	9	3	18	44	57	−13	30	
13	Sun Postal Sports	30	9	3	18	51	74	−23	30	
14	New Bradwell St Peter	30	9	2	19	44	76	−32	29	
15	Winslow United	30	5	7	18	40	76	−36	22	
16	Cranfield United	30	3	2	25	24	103	−79	11	
17	Dunstable Town 98	0	0	0	0	0	0	0	0	Club folded, record expunged

Source: fchd
Rules for classification: 1) points; 2) goal difference; 3) number of goals scored.

== Division Two ==
Spartan South Midlands Football League Division Two
- Season: 2006–07
- Champions: AFC Dunstable
- Matches: 240
- Goals: 1,038 (4.33 per match)

Division Two featured 18 clubs, all competed in the division last season.

=== League table ===
Pos	Team	Pld	W	D	L	GF	GA	GD	Pts	Qualification
1	AFC Dunstable	30	23	1	6	124	38	+86	70	
2	Kings Langley	30	21	3	6	78	34	+44	66	
3	Crawley Green	30	21	4	5	81	33	+48	67	
4	Tring Corinthians	30	18	2	10	71	46	+25	56	
5	Aston Clinton	30	16	7	7	87	49	+38	55	
6	Risborough Rangers	30	16	4	10	62	51	+11	52	
7	Kent Athletic	30	15	6	9	82	40	+42	51	
8	The 61	30	15	5	10	77	51	+26	50	
9	Caddington	30	14	4	12	96	62	+34	46	
10	Totternhoe	30	14	2	14	57	52	+5	44	
11	Mursley United	30	9	8	13	61	56	+5	35	
12	Loughton Orient	30	8	6	16	45	70	−25	30	Resigned from the league
13	Pitstone & Ivinghoe United	30	8	4	18	37	69	−32	28	
14	Padbury United	30	4	5	21	33	97	−64	17	
15	Markyate	30	2	4	24	22	146	−124	10	
16	Old Bradwell United	30	2	3	25	25	144	−119	9	
17	Flamstead	0	0	0	0	0	0	0	0	Clubs folded, records expunged
18	M K Scot	0	0	0	0	0	0	0	0	Clubs folded, records expunged

Source: fchd
Rules for classification: 1) points; 2) goal difference; 3) number of goals scored.
