= 2007–08 Spartan South Midlands Football League =

The 2007–08 Spartan South Midlands Football League season is the 11th in the history of Spartan South Midlands Football League a football competition in England.

== Premier Division ==
Spartan South Midlands Football League Premier Division
- Season: 2007–08
- Champions: Beaconsfiled SYCOB
- Promoted: Beaconsfiled SYCOB
- Relegated: London Colney; Ruislip Manor
- Matches: 462
- Goals: 1,587 (3.44 per match)

The Premier Division featured 18 clubs which competed in the division last season, along with four new clubs:

- Beaconsfiled SYCOB, relegated from the Southern Football League
- Brimsdown Rovers, promoted from Division One
- Cockfosters, promoted from Division One
- Hanwell Town, relegated from the Southern Football League

=== League table ===
Pos	Team	Pld	W	D	L	GF	GA	GD	Pts	Promotion or relegation
1	Beaconsfield SYCOB	42	31	5	6	102	36	+66	98	Promoted to the Southern Football League
2	Chalfont St Peter	42	26	11	5	104	45	+59	89	
3	Biggleswade Town	42	28	5	9	93	51	+42	89	
4	Hertford Town	42	25	6	11	95	45	+50	81	
5	Harefield United	42	25	5	12	86	52	+34	80	
6	Langford	42	23	4	15	97	67	+30	73	
7	Leverstock Green	42	21	10	11	86	57	+29	73	
8	Brimsdown Rovers	42	21	7	14	85	51	+34	70	
9	Hanwell Town	42	21	7	14	79	65	+14	70	
10	Tring Athletic	42	19	6	17	77	76	+1	63	
11	St Margaretsbury	42	18	8	16	66	52	+14	62	
12	Broxbourne Borough V&E	42	20	9	13	81	73	+8	59 (Note: Broxbourne Borough V&E deducted 10 points.)	
13	Aylesbury Vale	42	16	8	18	64	73	−9	56	
14	Kingsbury London Tigers	42	15	8	19	57	73	−16	53	
15	Colney Heath	42	14	6	22	47	82	−35	48	
16	Welwyn Garden City	42	14	3	25	64	95	−31	45	
17	Cockfosters	42	11	9	22	61	92	−31	42	
18	Biggleswade United	42	11	8	23	60	97	−37	41	
19	Oxhey Jets	42	9	10	23	64	87	−23	37	
20	Holmer Green	42	8	9	25	49	99	−50	33	
21	Ruislip Manor	42	6	6	30	43	105	−62	24	Relegated to Division One
22	London Colney	42	3	4	35	27	114	−87	13	Relegated to Division One

Source: fchd
Rules for classification: 1) points; 2) goal difference; 3) number of goals scored.

== Division One ==
Spartan South Midlands Football League Division One
- Season: 2007–08
- Champions: Kentish Town
- Promoted: Kentish Town; Haringey Borough
- Matches: 342
- Goals: 1,267 (3.7 per match)

Division One featured 14 clubs which competed in the division last season, along with five new clubs:

- Bedford Town Reserves
- Cheshunt Reserves
- Haringey Borough, relegated from the Premier Division
- Royston Town, relegated from the Premier Division
- Sport London e Benfica, joined from the Middlesex County Football League

Also, Bedford Valerio United changed name to Bedford.

=== League table ===
Pos	Team	Pld	W	D	L	GF	GA	GD	Pts	Promotion
1	Kentish Town	36	23	6	7	92	52	+40	75	Promoted to the Premier Division
2	Haringey Borough	36	22	7	7	87	55	+32	73	Promoted to the Premier Division
3	Hoddesdon Town	36	20	9	7	77	49	+28	69	
4	Stony Stratford Town	36	20	7	9	89	58	+31	67	
5	Royston Town	36	19	8	9	92	44	+48	65	
6	New Bradwell St Peter	36	17	11	8	63	43	+20	62	
7	Ampthill Town	36	18	6	12	90	64	+26	60	
8	Sport London e Benfica	36	16	8	12	67	50	+17	56	
9	Bedford	36	16	2	18	69	82	−13	50	
10	Cheshunt Reserves	36	13	10	13	59	55	+4	49	Resigned from the league
11	Amersham Town	36	14	5	17	66	72	−6	47	
12	Brache Sparta	36	12	6	18	55	81	−26	42	
13	Buckingham Athletic	36	10	11	15	45	56	−11	41	
14	Bedford Town Reserves	36	10	8	18	49	74	−25	38	
15	Arlesey Athletic	36	10	7	19	52	79	−27	37	
16	Harpenden Town	36	8	10	18	44	66	−22	34	
17	Sun Postal Sports	36	9	7	20	49	81	−32	34	
18	Winslow United	36	8	7	21	64	107	−43	31	
19	Cranfield United	36	8	3	25	58	99	−41	27	

Source: fchd
Rules for classification: 1) points; 2) goal difference; 3) number of goals scored.

== Division Two ==
Spartan South Midlands Football League Division Two
- Season: 2007–08
- Champions: Kings Langley
- Promoted: Kings Langley; Crawley Green
- Matches: 210
- Goals: 819 (3.9 per match)

Division Two featured 15 clubs, all competed in the division last season.

=== League table ===
Pos	Team	Pld	W	D	L	GF	GA	GD	Pts	Qualification
1	Kings Langley	28	22	5	1	62	24	+38	71	Promoted to Division One
2	Crawley Green	28	19	6	3	88	20	+68	63	Promoted to Division One
3	The 61	28	16	5	7	65	27	+38	53	
4	AFC Dunstable	28	16	5	7	76	42	+34	53	
5	Aston Clinton	28	16	3	9	66	36	+30	51	
6	Caddington	28	16	2	10	68	37	+31	50	
7	Pitstone & Ivinghoe United	28	14	5	9	54	38	+16	47	
8	Tring Corinthians	28	13	4	11	67	52	+15	43	
9	Kent Athletic	28	12	5	11	68	38	+30	41	
10	Mursley United	28	11	4	13	51	52	−1	37	
11	Risborough Rangers	28	7	10	11	34	43	−9	31	
12	Totternhoe	28	9	2	17	49	80	−31	29	
13	Padbury United	28	3	6	19	27	108	−81	15	
14	Old Bradwell United	28	2	2	24	24	87	−63	8	
15	Markyate	28	1	2	25	20	135	−115	5	

Source: fchd
Rules for classification: 1) points; 2) goal difference; 3) number of goals scored.
