= 2003–04 Spartan South Midlands Football League =

The 2003–04 Spartan South Midlands Football League season is the 7th in the history of Spartan South Midlands Football League a football competition in England.

== Premier Division ==
Spartan South Midlands Football League Premier Division
- Season: 2003–04
- Champions: Beaconsfield SYCOB
- Promoted: Beaconsfield SYCOB
- Matches: 342
- Goals: 1,196 (3.5 per match)

The Premier Division featured 17 clubs which competed in the division last season, along with two clubs, promoted from Division One:

- Harpenden Town
- Leverstock Green

=== League table ===
Pos	Team	Pld	W	D	L	GF	GA	GD	Pts	Promotion
1	Beaconsfield SYCOB	36	27	7	2	95	21	+74	88	Promoted to the Southern Football League
2	Brook House	36	26	2	8	82	35	+47	80	Transferred to the Isthmian League Division Two
3	St Margaretsbury	36	24	5	7	66	29	+37	77	
4	Potters Bar Town	36	22	8	6	86	35	+51	74	
5	Harefield United	36	22	5	9	87	50	+37	71	
6	Hanwell Town	36	22	4	10	86	49	+37	70	
7	London Colney	36	18	6	12	76	48	+28	60	
8	Greenacres	36	16	6	14	77	78	−1	54	Resigned from the league
9	Leverstock Green	36	14	7	15	54	55	−1	49	
10	Ruislip Manor	36	14	6	16	60	62	−2	48	
11	Hoddesdon Town	36	13	7	16	53	53	0	46	
12	Hillingdon Borough	36	13	7	16	56	67	−11	46	
13	Royston Town	36	11	7	18	63	78	−15	40	
14	Harpenden Town	36	9	9	18	47	81	−34	36	
15	Biggleswade Town	36	9	8	19	56	82	−26	35	
16	Broxbourne Borough V&E	36	9	3	24	36	93	−57	30	
17	Bedford United & Valerio	36	6	6	24	32	84	−52	24	
18	Haringey Borough	36	5	7	24	43	90	−47	22	
19	Holmer Green	36	5	4	27	41	106	−65	19	

Source: fchd
Rules for classification: 1) points; 2) goal difference; 3) number of goals scored.

== Division One ==
Spartan South Midlands Football League Division One
- Season: 2003–04
- Champions: Haywood United
- Promoted: Haywood United; Langford; Tring Athletic; Welwyn Garden City
- Matches: 306
- Goals: 1,018 (3.33 per match)

Division One featured 16 clubs which competed in the division last season, along with two new clubs:

- Buckingham Athletic, promoted from Division Two
- Sun Postal Sports, joined from the Herts County League

=== League table ===
Pos	Team	Pld	W	D	L	GF	GA	GD	Pts	Promotion or relegation
1	Haywood United	34	23	7	4	91	32	+59	76	Promoted to the Premier Division
2	Langford	34	21	6	7	92	43	+49	69	Promoted to the Premier Division
3	Welwyn Garden City	34	19	9	6	62	26	+36	66	Promoted to the Premier Division
4	Tring Athletic	34	19	6	9	67	37	+30	63	Promoted to the Premier Division
5	Buckingham Athletic	34	18	7	9	67	38	+29	61	
6	Colney Heath	34	17	6	11	66	54	+12	57	
7	Cockfosters	34	17	5	12	63	56	+7	56	
8	Biggleswade United	34	16	7	11	55	50	+5	55	
9	Sun Postal Sports	34	14	5	15	64	62	+2	47	
10	Brimsdown Rovers	34	13	8	13	53	56	−3	47	
11	Stony Stratford Town	34	13	5	16	57	64	−7	44	
12	Kings Langley	34	8	14	12	42	64	−22	38	Demoted to Division Two
13	Brache Sparta	34	9	8	17	52	69	−17	35	
14	Pitstone & Ivinghoe United	34	9	6	19	40	60	−20	33	Demoted to Division Two
15	The 61	34	8	8	18	32	59	−27	32	Demoted to Division Two
16	New Bradwell St Peter	34	8	6	20	41	79	−38	30	
17	Shillington	34	8	2	24	40	84	−44	26	
18	Ampthill Town	34	7	3	24	34	85	−51	24	

Source: fchd
Rules for classification: 1) points; 2) goal difference; 3) number of goals scored.

== Division Two ==
Spartan South Midlands Football League Division Two
- Season: 2003–04
- Champions: Old Dunstablians
- Promoted: Winslow United; Arlesey Athletic; Cranfield United; Kentish Town; Amersham Town
- Matches: 272
- Goals: 1,064 (3.91 per match)

Division Two featured 13 clubs which competed in the division last season, along with four new clubs:

- Arlesey Athletic, new club
- Kentish Town
- Markyate
- Risborough Rangers, relegated from Division One

Also, Padbury United changed name to Padbury B T F C.

=== League table ===
Pos	Team	Pld	W	D	L	GF	GA	GD	Pts	Promotion
1	Old Dunstablians	32	27	3	2	108	23	+85	84	
2	Winslow United	32	23	3	6	90	43	+47	72	Promoted to Division One
3	Arlesey Athletic	32	21	2	9	84	48	+36	65	Promoted to Division One
4	Risborough Rangers	32	19	7	6	75	28	+47	64	
5	Abbey National	32	16	4	12	69	56	+13	52	
6	Crawley Green	32	15	4	13	75	60	+15	49	
7	Cranfield United	32	14	4	14	61	59	+2	46	Promoted to Division One
8	Kent Athletic	32	13	6	13	55	46	+9	45	
9	Padbury B T F C	32	13	6	13	63	56	+7	45	
10	Kentish Town	32	13	6	13	68	68	0	45	Promoted to Division One
11	Mursley United	32	13	4	15	60	73	−13	43	
12	Caddington	32	8	11	13	53	72	−19	35	
13	Totternhoe	32	9	6	17	42	73	−31	33	
14	Markyate	32	6	10	16	35	54	−19	28	
15	Flamstead	32	6	6	20	42	78	−36	24	
16	Amersham Town	32	9	1	22	47	94	−47	16 (Note: Amersham Town deducted 12 points.)	Promoted to Division One
17	Old Bradwell United	32	3	5	24	37	133	−96	14	

Source: fchd
Rules for classification: 1) points; 2) goal difference; 3) number of goals scored.
