= 2005–06 Spartan South Midlands Football League =

The 2005–06 Spartan South Midlands Football League season is the 9th in the history of Spartan South Midlands Football League a football competition in England.

== Premier Division ==
Spartan South Midlands Football League Premier Division
- Season: 2005–06
- Champions: Oxford City
- Promoted: Oxford City; Hillingdon Borough; Hanwell Town
- Relegated: Harpenden Town
- Matches: 380
- Goals: 1,201 (3.16 per match)

The Premier Division featured 17 clubs which competed in the division last season, along with three new clubs:

- Biggleswade United, promoted from Division One
- Oxford City, relegated from the Southern Football League
- Oxhey Jets, promoted from Division One

Also, Haywood United changed name to Aylesbury Vale.

=== League table ===
Pos	Team	Pld	W	D	L	GF	GA	GD	Pts	Promotion or relegation
1	Oxford City	38	27	7	4	91	41	+50	88	Promoted to the Southern Football League
2	Hillingdon Borough	38	28	4	6	80	41	+39	88	Promoted to the Southern Football League
3	Hanwell Town	38	24	6	8	95	45	+50	78	Promoted to the Southern Football League
4	Harefield United	38	23	9	6	81	38	+43	78	
5	Aylesbury Vale	38	23	5	10	79	52	+27	74	
6	Leverstock Green	38	18	9	11	64	51	+13	63	
7	Holmer Green	38	18	7	13	69	59	+10	61	
8	Welwyn Garden City	38	16	10	12	59	45	+14	58	
9	Biggleswade United	38	16	7	15	60	54	+6	55	
10	Tring Athletic	38	12	12	14	40	39	+1	48	
11	Broxbourne Borough V&E	38	14	5	19	66	63	+3	47	
12	St Margaretsbury	38	13	7	18	61	57	+4	46	
13	Oxhey Jets	38	12	8	18	54	60	−6	44	
14	London Colney	38	11	8	19	49	68	−19	41	
15	Biggleswade Town	38	11	8	19	52	74	−22	41	
16	Ruislip Manor	38	10	8	20	44	56	−12	38	
17	Langford	38	11	3	24	51	102	−51	36	
18	Royston Town	38	10	5	23	39	86	−47	35	
19	Haringey Borough	38	8	4	26	34	86	−52	28	
20	Harpenden Town	38	6	6	26	33	84	−51	24	Relegated to Division One

Source: fchd
Rules for classification: 1) points; 2) goal difference; 3) number of goals scored.

== Division One ==
Spartan South Midlands Football League Division One
- Season: 2005–06
- Champions: Colney Heath
- Promoted: Colney Heath
- Matches: 272
- Goals: 1,018 (3.74 per match)

Division One featured 14 clubs which competed in the division last season, along with three new clubs:

- Bedford United & Valerio, relegated from the Premier Division
- Dunstable Town 98, promoted from Division Two
- Hoddesdon Town, relegated from the Premier Division

=== League table ===
Pos	Team	Pld	W	D	L	GF	GA	GD	Pts	Promotion
1	Colney Heath	32	26	3	3	106	27	+79	81	Promoted to the Premier Division
2	Brache Sparta	32	23	3	6	76	38	+38	72	
3	Stony Stratford Town	32	20	6	6	90	42	+48	66	
4	New Bradwell St Peter	32	16	4	12	60	54	+6	52	
5	Brimsdown Rovers	32	15	6	11	52	50	+2	51	
6	Arlesey Athletic	32	15	5	12	71	57	+14	50	
7	Hoddesdon Town	32	14	6	12	64	50	+14	48	
8	Cockfosters	32	14	6	12	63	61	+2	48	
9	Sun Postal Sports	32	13	5	14	58	61	−3	44	
10	Bedford United & Valerio	32	15	2	15	52	86	−34	44 (Note: Bedford United & Valerio deducted 3 points)	
11	Kentish Town	32	11	8	13	65	68	−3	41	
12	Dunstable Town 98	32	12	5	15	58	62	−4	41	
13	Buckingham Athletic	32	12	4	16	46	54	−8	40	
14	Winslow United	32	9	6	17	48	73	−25	33	
15	Cranfield United	32	7	4	21	36	68	−32	25	
16	Ampthill Town	32	6	3	23	43	90	−47	21	
17	Amersham Town	32	4	4	24	30	77	−47	16	

Source: fchd
Rules for classification: 1) points; 2) goal difference; 3) number of goals scored.

== Division Two ==
Spartan South Midlands Football League Division Two
- Season: 2005–06
- Champions: Aston Clinton
- Matches: 306
- Goals: 1,290 (4.22 per match)

Division Two featured 15 clubs which competed in the division last season, along with three new clubs:

- Aston Clinton
- M K Scot
- Tring Corinthians

Also, Padbury B T F C changed name to Padbury United.

=== League table ===
Pos	Team	Pld	W	D	L	GF	GA	GD	Pts
1	Aston Clinton	34	29	3	2	142	30	+112	90
2	AFC Dunstable	34	27	2	5	159	35	+124	83
3	Kent Athletic	34	25	4	5	79	31	+48	79
4	Tring Corinthians	34	20	7	7	106	47	+59	67
5	Crawley Green	34	20	5	9	77	47	+30	65
6	Kings Langley	34	19	5	10	70	45	+25	62
7	Old Bradwell United	34	18	2	14	71	63	+8	56
8	Totternhoe	34	15	7	12	70	63	+7	52
9	M K Scot	34	14	8	12	76	60	+16	50
10	Flamstead	34	13	7	14	65	69	−4	46
11	The 61	34	13	6	15	58	54	+4	45
12	Risborough Rangers	34	11	8	15	70	72	−2	41
13	Caddington	34	12	5	17	62	64	−2	41
14	Pitstone & Ivinghoe United	34	7	8	19	39	84	−45	29
15	Mursley United	34	7	6	21	41	72	−31	27
16	Markyate	34	3	4	27	29	117	−88	13
17	Padbury United	34	3	4	27	43	137	−94	13
18	Loughton Orient	34	4	1	29	33	200	−167	13

Source: fchd
Rules for classification: 1) points; 2) goal difference; 3) number of goals scored.
