= 2002–03 Spartan South Midlands Football League =

The 2002–03 Spartan South Midlands Football League season is the 6th in the history of Spartan South Midlands Football League a football competition in England.

== Premier Division ==
Spartan South Midlands Football League Premier Division
- Season: 2002–03
- Champions: Dunstable Town
- Promoted: Dunstable Town
- Matches: 342
- Goals: 1,156 (3.38 per match)

The Premier Division featured 18 clubs which competed in the division last season, along with two clubs, promoted from Division One:

- Greenacres
- Harefield United

Also, Bedford United changed name to Bedford United & Valerio and Somersett Ambury V & E changed name to Broxbourne Borough V&E.

=== League table ===
Pos	Team	Pld	W	D	L	GF	GA	GD	Pts	Promotion
1	Dunstable Town	36	26	6	4	104	32	+72	84	Promoted to the Isthmian League Division One North
2	Beaconsfield SYCOB	36	24	7	5	66	30	+36	79	
3	Potters Bar Town	36	23	6	7	80	42	+38	75	
4	Harefield United	36	21	7	8	79	45	+34	70	
5	St Margaretsbury	36	18	6	12	79	60	+19	60	
6	London Colney	36	15	10	11	65	57	+8	55	
7	Ruislip Manor	36	15	8	13	47	56	−9	53	
8	Hanwell Town	36	16	4	16	94	82	+12	52	
9	Milton Keynes City	36	15	7	14	58	57	+1	52	Resigned from the league
10	Hoddesdon Town	36	14	9	13	54	48	+6	51	
11	Biggleswade Town	36	13	6	17	59	67	−8	45	
12	Hillingdon Borough	36	12	6	18	44	57	−13	42	
13	Broxbourne Borough V&E	36	13	5	18	49	64	−15	44	
14	Greenacres	36	11	6	19	66	77	−11	39	
15	Haringey Borough	36	10	8	18	50	70	−20	38	
16	Royston Town	36	10	7	19	46	63	−17	37	
17	Brook House	36	10	9	17	36	67	−31	39	
18	Bedford United & Valerio	36	7	8	21	40	74	−34	29	
19	Holmer Green	36	5	3	28	40	108	−68	18	
20	Letchworth	0	0	0	0	0	0	0	0	Club folded, record expunged

Source: fchd
Rules for classification: 1) points; 2) goal difference; 3) number of goals scored.

== Division One ==
Spartan South Midlands Football League Division One
- Season: 2002–03
- Champions: Pitstone & Ivinghoe United
- Promoted: Harpenden Town; Leverstock Green
- Relegated: Risborough Rangers
- Matches: 342
- Goals: 1,279 (3.74 per match)

Division One featured 15 clubs which competed in the division last season, along with four new clubs.

- Two clubs relegated from the Premier Division:
  - Brache Sparta
  - New Bradwell St Peter
- Two clubs promoted from Division Two:
  - Haywood United
  - Shillington

=== League table ===
Pos	Team	Pld	W	D	L	GF	GA	GD	Pts	Promotion or relegation
1	Pitstone & Ivinghoe United	36	30	2	4	107	33	+74	92	
2	Harpenden Town	36	26	4	6	122	35	+87	82	Promoted to the Premier Division
3	Tring Athletic	36	24	9	3	89	31	+58	81	
4	Leverstock Green	36	21	8	7	82	37	+45	71	Promoted to the Premier Division
5	Colney Heath	36	23	1	12	85	42	+43	70	
6	Welwyn Garden City	36	18	7	11	76	46	+30	61	
7	Cockfosters	36	19	3	14	89	66	+23	60	
8	Biggleswade United	36	17	6	13	68	55	+13	57	
9	Haywood United	36	16	6	14	78	68	+10	54	
10	Brache Sparta	36	17	3	16	67	61	+6	54	
11	Brimsdown Rovers	36	14	7	15	51	58	−7	49	
12	Stony Stratford Town	36	11	10	15	51	66	−15	43	
13	Langford	36	9	6	21	62	90	−28	33	
14	Kings Langley	36	8	9	19	50	89	−39	33	
15	The 61	36	9	5	22	37	79	−42	32	
16	Shillington	36	9	4	23	45	94	−49	31	
17	New Bradwell St Peter	36	6	11	19	47	88	−41	29	
18	Ampthill Town	36	8	1	27	38	102	−64	25	
19	Risborough Rangers	36	4	4	28	35	139	−104	16	Relegated to Division Two

Source: fchd
Rules for classification: 1) points; 2) goal difference; 3) number of goals scored.

== Division Two ==
Spartan South Midlands Football League Division Two
- Season: 2002–03
- Champions: Buckingham Athletic
- Promoted: Buckingham Athletic
- Matches: 210
- Goals: 949 (4.52 per match)

Division Two featured 13 clubs which competed in the division last season, along with two clubs relegated from Division One:

- Amersham Town
- Winslow United

=== League table ===
Pos	Team	Pld	W	D	L	GF	GA	GD	Pts	Promotion
1	Buckingham Athletic	28	24	1	3	113	21	+92	73	Promoted to Division One
2	Old Dunstablians	28	23	2	3	113	29	+84	71	
3	Kent Athletic	28	18	3	7	79	30	+49	57	
4	Crawley Green	28	17	4	7	79	45	+34	55	
5	Amersham Town	28	16	6	6	80	54	+26	54	
6	Winslow United	28	15	6	7	62	49	+13	51	
7	Abbey National	28	14	3	11	67	58	+9	45	
8	Mursley United	28	12	4	12	61	56	+5	40	
9	Cranfield United	28	12	4	12	46	55	−9	40	
10	Flamstead	28	8	2	18	38	99	−61	26	
11	Old Bradwell United	28	6	7	15	50	83	−33	25	
12	Totternhoe	28	6	5	17	40	88	−48	23	
13	Caddington	28	6	3	19	38	80	−42	21	
14	Scot	28	5	0	23	46	107	−61	15	Resigned from the league
15	Padbury United	28	2	2	24	38	96	−58	5 (Note: Padbury United deducted 3 points.)	

Source: fchd
Rules for classification: 1) points; 2) goal difference; 3) number of goals scored.
