= 2008–09 Spartan South Midlands Football League =

The 2008–09 Spartan South Midlands Football League season is the 12th in the history of Spartan South Midlands Football League a football competition in England.

== Premier Division ==
Spartan South Midlands Football League Premier Division
- Season: 2008–09
- Champions: Biggleswade Town
- Promoted: Biggleswade Town
- Relegated: Cockfosters; Holmer Green
- Matches: 420
- Goals: 1,480 (3.52 per match)

The Premier Division featured 19 clubs which competed in the division last season, along with three new clubs:

- Berkhamsted Town, relegated from the Southern Football League
- Haringey Borough, promoted from Division One
- Kentish Town, promoted from Division One

=== League table ===
| Pos | Team | Pld | W | D | L | GF | GA | GD | Pts | Promotion or relegation |
|---|---|---|---|---|---|---|---|---|---|---|
| 1 | Biggleswade Town | 40 | 27 | 4 | 9 | 100 | 41 | +59 | 85 | Promoted to the Southern Football League |
| 2 | Harefield United | 40 | 26 | 7 | 7 | 103 | 45 | +58 | 85 | |
| 3 | Chalfont St Peter | 40 | 23 | 9 | 8 | 99 | 56 | +43 | 78 | |
| 4 | Broxbourne Borough V&E | 40 | 20 | 8 | 12 | 76 | 63 | +13 | 68 | |
| 5 | Kingsbury London Tigers | 40 | 18 | 12 | 10 | 68 | 52 | +16 | 66 | |
| 6 | Leverstock Green | 40 | 18 | 10 | 12 | 90 | 60 | +30 | 64 | |
| 7 | Hanwell Town | 40 | 17 | 11 | 12 | 81 | 53 | +28 | 62 | |
| 8 | Tring Athletic | 40 | 18 | 8 | 14 | 81 | 67 | +14 | 62 | |
| 9 | Welwyn Garden City | 40 | 18 | 7 | 15 | 69 | 75 | −6 | 61 | |
| 10 | Hertford Town | 40 | 15 | 13 | 12 | 61 | 46 | +15 | 58 | |
| 11 | Langford | 40 | 16 | 9 | 15 | 81 | 82 | −1 | 57 | |
| 12 | Colney Heath | 40 | 16 | 8 | 16 | 67 | 71 | −4 | 56 | |
| 13 | Oxhey Jets | 40 | 15 | 10 | 15 | 77 | 82 | −5 | 55 | |
| 14 | St Margaretsbury | 40 | 15 | 8 | 17 | 54 | 62 | −8 | 53 | |
| 15 | Aylesbury Vale | 40 | 14 | 7 | 19 | 56 | 74 | −18 | 49 | |
| 16 | Biggleswade United | 40 | 13 | 6 | 21 | 52 | 82 | −30 | 45 | |
| 17 | Brimsdown Rovers | 40 | 10 | 11 | 19 | 59 | 77 | −18 | 41 | |
| 18 | Haringey Borough | 40 | 10 | 7 | 23 | 50 | 83 | −33 | 37 | |
| 19 | Cockfosters | 40 | 9 | 6 | 25 | 62 | 101 | −39 | 33 | Relegated to Division One |
| 20 | Holmer Green | 40 | 6 | 10 | 24 | 36 | 80 | −44 | 28 | Relegated to Division One |
| 21 | Kentish Town | 40 | 7 | 7 | 26 | 58 | 128 | −70 | 28 | |
| 22 | Berkhamsted Town | 0 | 0 | 0 | 0 | 0 | 0 | 0 | 0 | Club folded, record expunged |

Source: fchd
Rules for classification: 1) points; 2) goal difference; 3) number of goals scored.

== Division One ==
Spartan South Midlands Football League Division One
- Season: 2008–09
- Champions: Royston Town
- Promoted: Royston Town; Hatfield Town
- Matches: 420
- Goals: 1,584 (3.77 per match)

Division One featured 16 clubs which competed in the division last season, along with five new clubs.

- Two clubs relegated from the Premier Division:
  - London Colney
  - Ruislip Manor
- Two clubs promoted from Division Two:
  - Crawley Green Sports
  - Kings Langley
- Plus:
  - Hatfield Town, joined from the Herts County League

Also, Ruislip Manor changed name to Tokyngton Manor.

=== League table ===
| Pos | Team | Pld | W | D | L | GF | GA | GD | Pts | Promotion |
|---|---|---|---|---|---|---|---|---|---|---|
| 1 | Royston Town | 40 | 33 | 4 | 3 | 138 | 30 | +108 | 103 | Promoted to the Premier Division |
| 2 | Kings Langley | 40 | 26 | 9 | 5 | 93 | 34 | +59 | 87 | |
| 3 | Hatfield Town | 40 | 26 | 4 | 10 | 97 | 55 | +42 | 82 | Promoted to the Premier Division |
| 4 | Bedford Town Reserves | 40 | 20 | 12 | 8 | 68 | 39 | +29 | 72 | |
| 5 | Hoddesdon Town | 40 | 21 | 8 | 11 | 73 | 41 | +32 | 71 | |
| 6 | New Bradwell St Peter | 40 | 20 | 10 | 10 | 80 | 56 | +24 | 70 | |
| 7 | Amersham Town | 40 | 20 | 10 | 10 | 88 | 66 | +22 | 70 | |
| 8 | Harpenden Town | 40 | 20 | 7 | 13 | 95 | 60 | +35 | 67 | |
| 9 | London Colney | 40 | 19 | 8 | 13 | 94 | 57 | +37 | 65 | |
| 10 | Cranfield United | 40 | 20 | 4 | 16 | 84 | 65 | +19 | 64 | |
| 11 | Tokyngton Manor | 40 | 17 | 7 | 16 | 71 | 84 | −13 | 58 | |
| 12 | Winslow United | 40 | 16 | 8 | 16 | 71 | 88 | −17 | 56 | Resigned from the league |
| 13 | Stony Stratford Town | 40 | 15 | 6 | 19 | 83 | 91 | −8 | 51 | |
| 14 | Bedford | 40 | 12 | 8 | 20 | 61 | 95 | −34 | 44 | |
| 15 | Ampthill Town | 40 | 12 | 6 | 22 | 63 | 74 | −11 | 42 | |
| 16 | Crawley Green Sports | 40 | 10 | 9 | 21 | 60 | 70 | −10 | 39 | |
| 17 | Arlesey Athletic | 40 | 10 | 6 | 24 | 57 | 114 | −57 | 36 | Club folded |
| 18 | Sport London e Benfica | 40 | 9 | 8 | 23 | 64 | 99 | −35 | 35 | |
| 19 | Buckingham Athletic | 40 | 7 | 6 | 27 | 45 | 78 | −33 | 27 | |
| 20 | Sun Postal Sports | 40 | 7 | 7 | 26 | 51 | 106 | −55 | 28 | |
| 21 | Brache Sparta | 40 | 5 | 3 | 32 | 48 | 182 | −134 | 18 | |

Source: fchd
Rules for classification: 1) points; 2) goal difference; 3) number of goals scored.

== Division Two ==
Spartan South Midlands Football League Division Two
- Season: 2008–09
- Champions: The 61
- Promoted: Hadley; AFC Dunstable
- Matches: 272
- Goals: 1,078 (3.96 per match)

Division Two featured 13 clubs, which competed in the division last season, along with five new clubs:

- Bletchley Town, joined from the North Bucks & District Football League
- Bucks Student Union
- Hadley, joined from the West Herts Saturday League
- Milton Keynes Wanderers, joined from the North Bucks & District Football League
- Wodson Park, joined from the Herts County League

=== League table ===
| Pos | Team | Pld | W | D | L | GF | GA | GD | Pts | Promotion |
|---|---|---|---|---|---|---|---|---|---|---|
| 1 | The 61 | 32 | 25 | 6 | 1 | 89 | 25 | +64 | 81 | |
| 2 | Hadley | 32 | 25 | 5 | 2 | 90 | 22 | +68 | 80 | Promoted to Division One |
| 3 | AFC Dunstable | 32 | 21 | 5 | 6 | 102 | 50 | +52 | 68 | Promoted to Division One |
| 4 | Tring Corinthians | 32 | 18 | 5 | 9 | 84 | 57 | +27 | 59 | |
| 5 | Padbury United | 32 | 19 | 2 | 11 | 71 | 55 | +16 | 59 | |
| 6 | Wodson Park | 32 | 16 | 5 | 11 | 65 | 40 | +25 | 53 | |
| 7 | Bucks Student Union | 32 | 15 | 4 | 13 | 72 | 54 | +18 | 49 | |
| 8 | Mursley United | 32 | 13 | 8 | 11 | 56 | 67 | −11 | 47 | |
| 9 | Pitstone & Ivinghoe United | 32 | 13 | 4 | 15 | 73 | 67 | +6 | 43 | |
| 10 | Risborough Rangers | 32 | 13 | 3 | 16 | 48 | 58 | −10 | 42 | |
| 11 | Markyate | 32 | 12 | 3 | 17 | 55 | 64 | −9 | 39 | Resigned from the league |
| 12 | Caddington | 32 | 9 | 3 | 20 | 62 | 82 | −20 | 30 | |
| 13 | Totternhoe | 32 | 7 | 8 | 17 | 45 | 75 | −30 | 29 | |
| 14 | Kent Athletic | 32 | 7 | 6 | 19 | 43 | 79 | −36 | 27 | |
| 15 | Aston Clinton | 32 | 8 | 5 | 19 | 44 | 83 | −39 | 26 (Note: Aston Clinton deducted 3 points.) | |
| 16 | Old Bradwell United | 32 | 4 | 7 | 21 | 33 | 79 | −46 | 19 | |
| 17 | Bletchley Town | 32 | 3 | 9 | 20 | 46 | 121 | −75 | 18 | |
| 18 | Milton Keynes Wanderers | 0 | 0 | 0 | 0 | 0 | 0 | 0 | 0 | Didn't finished the season, record expunged |

Source: fchd
Rules for classification: 1) points; 2) goal difference; 3) number of goals scored.
