= 2017–18 FA Cup qualifying rounds =

Tournament details
- Country: England; Wales

The 2017–18 FA Cup qualifying rounds open the 137th season of competition in England for The Football Association Challenge Cup (FA Cup), the world's oldest association football single knockout competition. A total of 737 teams were accepted for the competition, an increase of 1 from the previous season's 736.

The large number (645) of non-League clubs entering the tournament, from (Levels 5 to 10) in the English football pyramid, required the competition to start with six rounds of preliminary (2) and qualifying (4) knockout matches. The 32 winning teams from the fourth qualifying round progressed to the First round proper, where League teams tiered at Levels 3 and 4 entered the competition.

== Calendar and prizes ==
The calendar for the 2017–18 FA Cup qualifying rounds, as announced by The Football Association.

Round	Main date	Leagues entering at this round	New entries this round	Winners from previous round	Number of fixtures	Prize money
Extra preliminary round	5 August 2017	Levels 9–10	370	none	185	£1,500
Preliminary round	19 August 2017	Level 8	135	185	160	£1,925
First qualifying round	2 September 2017	Level 7	72	160	116	£3,000
Second qualifying round	16 September 2017	National League North; National League South	44	116	80	£4,500
Third qualifying round	30 September 2017	none	none	80	40	£7,500
Fourth qualifying round	14 October 2017	National League	24	40	32	£12,500
For the next rounds look 2017–18 FA Cup

== Extra preliminary round ==
The Extra Preliminary round draw was held on 7 July 2017. Fixtures were played on Friday 4, Saturday 5 and Sunday 6 August 2017; replays were completed on Wednesday 16 August 2017. 370 teams, from Level 9 and Level 10 of English football, entered at this stage of the competition. The round included 76 teams from Level 10 of English football, the lowest ranked clubs to compete in the tournament.

Tie	Home team (Tier)	Score	Away team (Tier)	Att.
Friday 4 August 2017
61	Heanor Town (9)	0–1	Aylestone Park (10)	213
78	Potton United (10)	0–0	Biggleswade United (9)	252
110	Flackwell Heath (9)	5–0	Burnham (9)	202
124	Crowborough Athletic (9)	2–0	Lingfield (10)	152
170	Sholing (9)	1–2	Alresford Town (9)	302
Saturday 5 August 2017
1	Penrith (9)	2–1	West Auckland Town (9)	213
2	Billingham Town (10)	0–3	Pickering Town (9)	134
3	Barnoldswick Town (9)	3–1	Jarrow Roofing BCA (9)	221
4	Sunderland RCA (9)	3–1	Garforth Town (9)	102
5	Shildon (9)	2–0	Morpeth Town (9)	270
6	Consett (9)	3–3	Bishop Auckland (9)	394
7	Washington (9)	0–3	Dunston UTS (9)	148
8	Bridlington Town (9)	2–0	Billingham Synthonia (9)	190
9	Newton Aycliffe (9)	1–0	Chester-le-Street Town (10)	131
10	Seaham Red Star (9)	1–1	Whitley Bay (9)	222
11	Thackley (9)	3–4	Harrogate Railway Athletic (9)	112
12	Guisborough Town (9)	4–2	Stockton Town (9)	256
13	Ashington (9)	1–0	Ryhope Colliery Welfare (9)	211
14	Newcastle Benfield (9)	1–0	West Allotment Celtic (10)	102
15	Albion Sports (9)	2–0	Nelson (10)	78
16	Team Northumbria (9)	0–1	Heaton Stannington (10)	95
17	Marske United (9)	4–4	North Shields (9)	217
18	Litherland REMYCA (10)	2–0	A.F.C. Liverpool (9)	312
20	Squires Gate (9)	0–4	Ashton Athletic (9)	82
21	Cammell Laird 1907 (10)	4–1	Maltby Main (9)	82
22	Padiham (9)	1–2	City of Liverpool (9)	357
23	Pontefract Collieries (9)	1–0	Alsager Town (10)	91
25	Runcorn Town (9)	3–2	A.F.C. Darwen (9)	120
26	Northwich Victoria (9)	2–2	1874 Northwich (9)	510
28	Congleton Town (9)	4–2	New Mills (10)	193
29	Irlam (9)	1–2	Abbey Hey (9)	203
30	Armthorpe Welfare (10)	1–1	Liversedge (9)	45
31	Parkgate (9)	4–2	Barnton (9)	83
32	Athersley Recreation (9)	0–5	West Didsbury & Chorlton (9)	113
33	Charnock Richard (9)	3–4	Penistone Church (9)	254
34	Maine Road (9)	3–2	Winsford United (9)	165
35	Runcorn Linnets (9)	2–0	Hemsworth Miners Welfare (9)	324
36	Hanley Town (9)	4–1	Atherstone Town (10)	181
37	Coventry United (9)	1–2	Rugby Town (9)	315
38	Sporting Khalsa (9)	2–2	Stourport Swifts (9)	57
39	AFC Wulfrunians (9)	3–0	Shawbury United (9)	72
40	Wolverhampton Sporting (10)	2–3	Haughmond (9)	55
41	Tividale (10)	1–1	Highgate United (9)	105
42	Walsall Wood (10)	3–1	Whitchurch Alport (10)	203
43	Coventry Sphinx (9)	0–2	Boldmere St. Michaels (9)	117
44	Daventry Town (9)	0–1	Worcester City (9)	244
45	Wolverhampton Casuals (10)	7–0	Malvern Town (10)	52
46	Westfields (9)	3–1	Bewdley Town (10)	219
47	Coleshill Town (9)	6–2	Wellington (Herefords) (9)	82
48	Bromsgrove Sporting (9)	2–2	Rocester (9)	602
49	Brocton (10)	3–0	Cadbury Athletic (10)	67
50	Kimberley Miners Welfare (10)	2–4	Blaby & Whetstone Athletic (10)	101
Walkover for Kimberley Miners Welfare as Blaby & Whetstone Athletic fielded an ineligible player.
51	Oadby Town (9)	1–1	St Andrews (9)	189
52	Birstall United (10)	3–0	South Normanton Athletic (9)	190
53	Bottesford Town (9)	6–0	Long Eaton United (9)	85
54	Leicester Road (10)	2–1	Sleaford Town (9)	54
55	Dunkirk (10)	2–1	Leicester Nirvana (9)	63
56	Kirby Muxloe (9)	4–2	Barton Town (9)	61
57	AFC Mansfield (9)	2–1	Hall Road Rangers (9)	70
58	Staveley Miners Welfare (9)	2–1	Loughborough University (9)	160
59	Retford United (10)	1–1	Quorn (9)	161
60	Clipstone (9)	3–1	West Bridgford (10)	100
62	Worksop Town (9)	1–2	Hinckley AFC (10)	435
63	Boston Town (9)	2–2	Radford (10)	90
64	Rainworth Miners Welfare (9)	0–1	Shepshed Dynamo (9)	95
65	Harrowby United (10)	0–3	Grimsby Borough (10)	70
66	Biggleswade (9)	1–4	Wisbech Town (9)	129
67	Swaffham Town (10)	3–1	Rothwell Corinthians (9)	80
68	Raunds Town (10)	1–1	Yaxley (9)	85
69	Peterborough Northern Star (9)	2–3	Deeping Rangers (9)	92
70	Cogenhoe United (9)	3–0	Godmanchester Rovers (9)	64
71	Ely City (9)	0–2	Holbeach United (9)	114
72	Huntingdon Town (10)	1–4	Newport Pagnell Town (9)	54
73	Eynesbury Rovers (9)	3–2	Thetford Town (9)	93
74	Northampton Sileby Rangers (9)	0–5	Harborough Town (9)	72
75	Wellingborough Whitworth (9)	0–4	Desborough Town (9)	52
76	Fakenham Town (9)	0–2	Wellingborough Town (9)	85
77	Histon (9)	0–1	Northampton ON Chenecks (9)	110
79	Hoddesdon Town (9)	1–2	Haverhill Rovers (9)	76
80	Sawbridgeworth Town (9)	0–3	West Essex (9)	115
81	Enfield 1893 (9)	1–2	Haverhill Borough (9)	44
82	Redbridge (9)	3–1	Stansted (9)	82
83	Takeley (9)	3–1	Wivenhoe Town (9)	86
84	Kirkley & Pakefield (9)	1–2	Saffron Walden Town (9)	98
85	Southend Manor (9)	1–0	Wroxham (9)	58
86	Framlingham Town (10)	0–0	Wadham Lodge (9)	236
87	Broxbourne Borough (10)	1–1	Tower Hamlets (9)	58
89	Ilford (9)	1–0	Woodbridge Town (10)	72
90	Clacton (9)	0–1	Clapton (9)	203
91	Hadleigh United (9)	3–2	Sporting Bengal United (9)	87
92	FC Romania (9)	2–2	Waltham Forest (9)	52
93	Hackney Wick (9)	0–1	Long Melford (9)	267
94	Felixstowe & Walton United (9)	2–7	Brantham Athletic (9)	255
95	Stanway Rovers (9)	2–4	Gorleston (9)	92
96	Hullbridge Sports (9)	5–1	Ipswich Wanderers (9)	70
98	Great Yarmouth Town (9)	5–0	Diss Town (10)	176
99	Newmarket Town (9)	5–1	Great Wakering Rovers (9)	88
100	Walsham-le-Willows (9)	2–2	Basildon United (9)	120
101	Welwyn Garden City (9)	2–4	North Greenford United (9)	160
102	Cockfosters (9)	1–1	Risborough Rangers (10)	120
103	Holmer Green (9)	4–0	A.F.C. Hayes (9)	71
104	Lydney Town (9)	1–3	Wantage Town (9)	107
105	Langford (10)	1–9	Hadley (9)	63
107	Stotfold (9)	1–12	Berkhamsted (9)	86
108	Woodley United (9)	1–2	Tuffley Rovers (9)	108
109	Southall (10)	5–1	Harpenden Town (9)	50
112	Fairford Town (9)	1–1	Longlevens (9)	202
113	Edgware Town (9)	1–1	Leverstock Green (9)	68
114	Chipping Sodbury Town (9)	3–1	Brackley Town Saints (9)	161
115	Leighton Town (9)	4–0	Oxhey Jets (9)	72
116	Windsor (9)	1–4	Wembley (9)	136
117	Brimscombe & Thrupp (9)	4–0	Sun Sports (9)	65
118	Royal Wootton Bassett Town (9)	1–2	Crawley Green (9)	89
119	Colney Heath (9)	1–0	Tring Athletic (9)	92
120	Ardley United (10)	1–3	Baldock Town (10)	52
121	Corinthian (9)	2–2	Deal Town (9)	71
122	Hassocks (9)	2–3	Hollands & Blair (9)	112

Tie	Home team (Tier)	Score	Away team (Tier)	Att.
123	Sheppey United (9)	3–2	AFC Croydon Athletic (9)	263
125	Sutton Common Rovers (9)	2–0	Canterbury City (9)	73
126	Newhaven (9)	0–0	Peacehaven & Telscombe (9)	504
127	Colliers Wood United (9)	2–2	AFC Uckfield Town (9)	60
128	Chessington & Hook United (10)	2–2	Lancing (9)	141
129	East Preston (9)	2–1	Saltdean United (9)	104
131	Hailsham Town (10)	1–8	Redhill (9)	86
132	Loxwood (9)	3–1	Holmesdale (10)	102
133	Tunbridge Wells (9)	1–0	Beckenham Town (9)	271
134	Walton & Hersham (9)	7–0	Mile Oak (10)	91
135	Sevenoaks Town (9)	3–1	Broadbridge Heath (9)	113
136	Hanworth Villa (9)	5–0	Bedfont & Feltham (10)	94
137	Glebe (9)	1–0	Lordswood (9)	102
138	Whitstable Town (9)	2–3	Croydon (9)	197
139	Worthing United (9)	2–4	Steyning Town (10)	128
140	Arundel (9)	0–4	Pagham (9)	150
141	Horley Town (9)	5–1	Raynes Park Vale (10)	83
142	Abbey Rangers (9)	1–3	Cray Valley Paper Mills (9)	60
143	Eastbourne Town (9)	2–1	Bearsted (9)	211
144	Spelthorne Sports (9)	1–3	Chertsey Town (9)	97
145	Rochester United (9)	1–1	Erith Town (9)	74
146	Erith & Belvedere (10)	4–0	Wick (10)	45
147	AC London (10)	3–2	Crawley Down Gatwick (9)	61
Match played at Crawley Down Gatwick.
148	Chatham Town (9)	1–1	Littlehampton Town (9)	201
149	Little Common (10)	1–2	Eastbourne United (9)	116
151	Haywards Heath Town (9)	A–A	Bedfont Sports (9)	107
Match abandoned after 45 minutes due to a waterlogged pitch when the scores were 1–1.
152	Horsham YMCA (9)	0–2	Three Bridges (9)	175
153	Bracknell Town (9)	3–0	Cowes Sports (9)	276
154	Thatcham Town (9)	5–0	Petersfield Town (9)	122
155	Christchurch (10)	1–5	AFC Portchester (9)	82
156	Farnham Town (9)	3–2	Fawley (10)	71
157	Bashley (9)	2–4	Fareham Town (9)	160
158	Hamworthy United (9)	4–1	Bemerton Heath Harlequins (9)	100
159	Team Solent (9)	2–5	Brockenhurst (9)	71
161	Amesbury Town (9)	4–0	Eversley & California (10)	56
162	Camberley Town (9)	0–0	Blackfield & Langley (9)	99
163	Whitchurch United (10)	0–3	Laverstock & Ford (10)	53
164	Ringwood Town (10)	0–6	Ascot United (9)	84
165	Binfield (9)	4–3	Chichester City (9)	101
166	Horndean (9)	2–1	Melksham Town (9)	68
167	Knaphill (9)	0–0	Bournemouth (9)	52
168	Newport (IoW) (9)	2–2	Guildford City (9)	174
169	Godalming Town (9)	2–1	Westfield (Surrey) (9)	90
171	Lymington Town (9)	0–2	Andover Town (9)	85
172	Clevedon Town (9)	2–2	Bitton (9)	99
173	Cadbury Heath (9)	4–1	Longwell Green Sports (9)	112
174	Plymouth Parkway (10)	0–1	Portland United (9)	115
175	St Austell (10)	1–1	Bridport (9)	292
176	Wells City (9)	2–1	Cribbs (9)	62
177	Shaftesbury (9)	0–0	Exmouth Town (10)	155
178	Shepton Mallet (9)	1–4	Tavistock (10)	88
179	Buckland Athletic (9)	2–3	Bodmin Town (10)	169
180	Cheddar (10)	0–2	Willand Rovers (9)	173
181	Wellington AFC (9)	1–3	Hengrove Athletic (9)	40
182	Street (9)	1–1	Hallen (9)	94
183	Brislington (9)	6–1	Sherborne Town (10)	41
184	Bridgwater Town (9)	5–2	Keynsham Town (10)	211
185	Bradford Town (9)	3–4	Odd Down (9)	151
Sunday 6 August 2017
19	AFC Emley (10)	0–3	Burscough (9)	306
24	Hallam (10)	3–0	Bootle (9)	310
27	Widnes (9)	0–5	Handsworth Parramore (9)	165
88	Barkingside (9)	0–4	Stowmarket Town (9)	215
97	St Margaretsbury (9)	3–2	Burnham Ramblers (9)	135
106	Highworth Town (9)	1–1	London Colney (9)	174
111	Highmoor Ibis (9)	3–1	Buckingham Town (10)	52
130	Epsom & Ewell (9)	1–2	Banstead Athletic (9)	123
150	Rusthall (9)	0–0	CB Hounslow United (9)	262
160	Badshot Lea (10)	1–1	Verwood Town (10)	101
Tuesday 8 August 2017
151	Haywards Heath Town (9)	5–2	Bedfont Sports (9)	84
Replays
Monday 7 August 2017
87R	Tower Hamlets (9)	1–0	Broxbourne Borough (10)	68
Tuesday 8 August 2017
10R	Whitley Bay (9)	4–1	Seaham Red Star (9)	259
26R	1874 Northwich (9)	2–0	Northwich Victoria (9)	429
30R	Liversedge (9)	5–3	Armthorpe Welfare (10)	91
38R	Stourport Swifts (9)	2–3 (a.e.t.)	Sporting Khalsa (9)	114
41R	Highgate United (9)	2–3	Tividale (10)	110
48R	Rocester (9)	0–3	Bromsgrove Sporting (9)	196
51R	St Andrews (9)	2–2 (1–3 p)	Oadby Town (9)	136
Match played at Oadby Town.
68R	Yaxley (9)	4–2 (a.e.t.)	Raunds Town (10)	72
78R	Biggleswade United (9)	1–2	Potton United (10)	142
100R	Basildon United (9)	3–0	Walsham-le-Willows (9)	184
102R	Risborough Rangers (10)	2–2 (2–4 p)	Cockfosters (9)	131
106R	London Colney (9)	2–4	Highworth Town (9)	82
112R	Longlevens (9)	5–1	Fairford Town (9)	132
113R	Leverstock Green (9)	A–A	Edgware Town (9)	-
Match abandoned in stoppage time due to serious injury to Leverstock Green player.
121R	Deal Town (9)	4–1	Corinthian (9)	120
126R	Peacehaven & Telscombe (9)	0–2	Newhaven (9)	439
127R	AFC Uckfield Town (9)	0–2	Colliers Wood United (9)	66
128R	Lancing (9)	1–3	Chessington & Hook United (10)	104
150R	CB Hounslow United (9)	2–1	Rusthall (9)	143
160R	Verwood Town (10)	3–3 (1–3 p)	Badshot Lea (10)	40
162R	Blackfield & Langley (9)	1–2 (a.e.t.)	Camberley Town (9)	86
167R	Bournemouth (9)	0–2	Knaphill (9)	52
172R	Bitton (9)	0–1 (a.e.t.)	Clevedon Town (9)	60
182R	Hallen (9)	1–4	Street (9)	65
Wednesday 9 August 2017
6R	Bishop Auckland (9)	2–5	Consett (9)	432
17R	North Shields (9)	0–1	Marske United (9)	279
59R	Quorn (9)	3–0	Retford United (10)	153
86R	Wadham Lodge (9)	1–3	Framlingham Town (10)	40
175R	Bridport (9)	1–0	St Austell (10)	212
177R	Exmouth Town (10)	1–2 (a.e.t.)	Shaftesbury (9)	175
Tuesday 15 August 2017
63R	Radford (10)	2–2 (3–4 p)	Boston Town (9)	107
92R	Waltham Forest (9)	1–2	FC Romania (9)	46
113R	Leverstock Green (9)	5–3	Edgware Town (9)	58
145R	Erith Town (9)	5–0	Rochester United (9)	75
Wednesday 16 August 2017
148R	Littlehampton Town (9)	2–1	Chatham Town (9)	158
168R	Guildford City (9)	3–0	Newport (IoW) (9)	153

== Preliminary round ==
The Preliminary round draw was also held on 7 July 2017. Fixtures were played on Friday 18, Saturday 19 and Sunday 20 August 2017; replays were concluded Monday 28 August 2017. 320 teams took part in this stage of the competition: 185 winners from the extra preliminary round and 135 entering at this stage from the six leagues at Level 8 of English football; Guernsey decided not to participate in the FA Cup this season. The round included 28 teams from Level 10, the lowest-ranked teams still in the competition.

Tie	Home team (Tier)	Score	Away team (Tier)	Att.
Friday 18 August 2017
24	Prescot Cables (8)	2–2	City of Liverpool (9)	973
56	Cambridge City (8)	1–0	Stamford (8)	236
60	Potton United (10)	2–0	AFC Dunstable (8)	187
136	AC London (10)	1–5	Egham Town (8)	52
Saturday 19 August 2017
1	Albion Sports (9)	2–1	Newton Aycliffe (9)	75
2	South Shields (8)	3–1	Bridlington Town (9)	1,420
4	Sunderland RCA (9)	4–0	Ashington (9)	98
5	Guisborough Town (9)	1–5	Shildon (9)	204
6	Goole (8)	1–2	Newcastle Benfield (9)	143
7	Barnoldswick Town (9)	2–1	Dunston UTS (9)	193
8	Tadcaster Albion (8)	0–1	Colne (8)	200
9	Harrogate Railway Athletic (9)	1–1	Kendal Town (8)	107
10	Scarborough Athletic (8)	1–1	Marske United (9)	885
11	Consett (9)	4–0	Heaton Stannington (10)	349
12	Penrith (9)	1–1	Whitley Bay (9)	221
13	Abbey Hey (9)	2–2	Maine Road (9)	134
14	Sheffield (8)	0–2	Ossett Town (8)	229
15	Penistone Church (9)	2–0	Litherland REMYCA (10)	208
16	Bamber Bridge (8)	3–2	Brighouse Town (8)	220
18	Frickley Athletic (8)	2–1	Runcorn Town (9)	188
19	Ramsbottom United (8)	2–3	Liversedge (9)	202
20	Pontefract Collieries (9)	1–2	Skelmersdale United (8)	99
21	Ashton Athletic (9)	4–2	Runcorn Linnets (9)	201
22	Parkgate (9)	2–4	Handsworth Parramore (9)	116
23	Trafford (8)	2–2	Kidsgrove Athletic (8)	197
25	1874 Northwich (9)	3–3	West Didsbury & Chorlton (9)	247
26	Glossop North End (8)	0–2	Mossley (8)	450
27	Hyde United (8)	4–2	Congleton Town (9)	332
28	Ossett Albion (8)	3–4	Droylsden (8)	89
29	Colwyn Bay (8)	3–0	Stocksbridge Park Steels (8)	207
30	Radcliffe Borough (8)	1–1	Burscough (9)	114
31	Leek Town (8)	2–0	Cammell Laird 1907 (10)	242
32	Sporting Khalsa (9)	1–1	Market Drayton Town (8)	73
33	Alvechurch (8)	2–0	Hanley Town (9)	235
34	Walsall Wood (10)	0–1	Tividale (10)	162
35	Bedworth United (8)	0–2	Haughmond (9)	108
36	Rugby Town (9)	2–3	Romulus (8)	201
37	Bromsgrove Sporting (9)	3–4	Coleshill Town (9)	708
38	Wolverhampton Casuals (10)	2–2	Boldmere St. Michaels (9)	55
40	Brocton (10)	2–0	Gresley (8)	99
41	Newcastle Town (8)	1–1	Evesham United (8)	123
42	AFC Wulfrunians (9)	1–1	Westfields (9)	87
43	Birstall United (10)	0–3	Cleethorpes Town (8)	196
44	Shepshed Dynamo (9)	3–0	Kimberley Miners Welfare (10)	174
45	Kirby Muxloe (9)	0–2	Dunkirk (10)	50
46	Grimsby Borough (10)	4–1	Leicester Road (10)	73
47	Oadby Town (9)	1–3	Loughborough Dynamo (8)	149
48	Hinckley AFC (10)	4–1	Aylestone Park (10)	172
50	Staveley Miners Welfare (9)	0–1	Basford United (8)	135
51	Boston Town (9)	3–2	Carlton Town (8)	56
52	Lincoln United (8)	0–0	Belper Town (8)	140
53	Bottesford Town (9)	4–1	Clipstone (9)	53
54	Wisbech Town (9)	2–2	Spalding United (8)	262
55	Dereham Town (8)	3–0	Corby Town (8)	164
57	Barton Rovers (8)	1–2	Deeping Rangers (9)	71
58	Yaxley (9)	5–3	Harborough Town (9)	68
59	Holbeach United (9)	6–1	Northampton ON Chenecks (9)	98
61	Newport Pagnell Town (9)	3–3	Kempston Rovers (8)	152
62	Arlesey Town (8)	3–1	Desborough Town (9)	80
63	Soham Town Rangers (8)	3–2	Cogenhoe United (9)	123
64	Eynesbury Rovers (9)	1–1	Peterborough Sports (8)	207
65	Wellingborough Town (9)	0–4	AFC Rushden & Diamonds (8)	513
66	Bedford Town (8)	3–1	Swaffham Town (10)	180
68	Bury Town (8)	1–2	Tilbury (8)	233
69	Southend Manor (9)	2–3	Gorleston (9)	64
70	Bowers & Pitsea (8)	0–2	Haringey Borough (8)	174
71	Maldon & Tiptree (8)	5–1	Waltham Abbey (8)	73
72	AFC Hornchurch (8)	2–0	Brentwood Town (8)	309
73	Canvey Island (8)	0–2	Witham Town (8)	224
74	Clapton (9)	2–0	Norwich United (8)	122
75	Framlingham Town (10)	0–1	Mildenhall Town (8)	246
76	Haverhill Rovers (9)	1–1	Heybridge Swifts (8)	188
77	Newmarket Town (9)	1–2	Ware (8)	100
78	Tower Hamlets (9)	0–4	Takeley (9)	55
79	Brantham Athletic (9)	3–6	Cheshunt (8)	70
80	Stowmarket Town (9)	1–1	Romford (8)	106
81	AFC Sudbury (8)	4–0	Aveley (8)	174
82	Ilford (9)	1–1	Haverhill Borough (9)	82
83	Hertford Town (8)	4–1	Hadleigh United (9)	260
84	Great Yarmouth Town (9)	1–0	Basildon United (9)	163
85	Grays Athletic (8)	2–0	Redbridge (9)	174
86	Long Melford (9)	1–2	FC Romania (9)	84
87	Barking (8)	0–0	Saffron Walden Town (9)	76
88	Potters Bar Town (8)	4–1	West Essex (9)	121
89	Slimbridge (8)	1–2	Cinderford Town (8)	164
90	Flackwell Heath (9)	1–2	Didcot Town (8)	118
92	Chalfont St Peter (8)	2–2	Beaconsfield Town (8)	87
93	Ashford Town (8)	3–0	Wembley (9)	104
94	Colney Heath (9)	2–0	Shortwood United (8)	112
95	Kidlington (8)	1–0	Wantage Town (9)	109
96	Swindon Supermarine (8)	1–0	Northwood (8)	132
97	Hayes & Yeading United (8)	1–0	Brimscombe & Thrupp (9)	201
98	Leighton Town (9)	2–3	Tuffley Rovers (9)	118
100	Chipping Sodbury Town (9)	1–3	Bishop's Cleeve (8)	104
101	Leverstock Green (9)	1–1	Aylesbury United (8)	98
102	Southall (10)	2–4	Hadley (9)	35
103	Aylesbury (8)	2–1	Cirencester Town (8)	72
104	Uxbridge (8)	0–4	Thame United (8)	85
106	Hanwell Town (8)	1–0	Longlevens (9)	64
107	Highmoor Ibis (9)	1–3	North Leigh (8)	50
108	Cockfosters (9)	3–0	Holmer Green (9)	112

Tie	Home team (Tier)	Score	Away team (Tier)	Att.
109	Pagham (9)	1–1	Sittingbourne (8)	124
110	Hollands & Blair (9)	1–4	Crowborough Athletic (9)	155
112	Whyteleafe (8)	1–1	Erith Town (9)	107
113	Carshalton Athletic (8)	1–1	Walton & Hersham (9)	263
114	Haywards Heath Town (9)	2–0	South Park (8)	114
115	Colliers Wood United (9)	1–1	Shoreham (8)	65
116	Sutton Common Rovers (9)	1–2	Eastbourne Town (9)	101
117	Corinthian-Casuals (8)	1–1	Hythe Town (8)	115
118	Greenwich Borough (8)	4–1	Three Bridges (9)	74
119	Deal Town (9)	2–2	Glebe (9)	121
120	Walton Casuals (8)	3–1	Molesey (8)	81
121	Redhill (9)	1–3	Ashford United (8)	178
122	Ramsgate (8)	3–1	Hanworth Villa (9)	183
123	East Grinstead Town (8)	3–2	VCD Athletic (8)	75
125	Banstead Athletic (9)	6–3	Loxwood (9)	89
126	East Preston (9)	0–8	Thamesmead Town (8)	89
128	Chipstead (8)	2–0	Horley Town (9)	85
129	Tunbridge Wells (9)	3–1	CB Hounslow United (9)	241
130	Steyning Town (10)	0–5	Phoenix Sports (8)	79
131	Chertsey Town (9)	1–3	Horsham (8)	120
133	Lewes (8)	3–3	Newhaven (9)	446
134	Sheppey United (9)	0–2	Hastings United (8)	397
135	Croydon (9)	0–0	Faversham Town (8)	110
137	Bracknell Town (9)	0–4	Winchester City (8)	238
138	Fleet Town (8)	1–1	AFC Totton (8)	130
139	Andover Town (9)	3–3	Wimborne Town (8)	164
140	Godalming Town (9)	3–0	Farnham Town (9)	155
141	AFC Portchester (9)	3–1	Amesbury Town (9)	107
142	Hamworthy United (9)	4–1	Ascot United (9)	65
143	Binfield (9)	1–1	Horndean (9)	120
144	Brockenhurst (9)	1–5	Hartley Wintney (8)	133
146	Salisbury (8)	3–2	Fareham Town (9)	505
147	Badshot Lea (10)	0–3	Moneyfields (8)	56
148	Laverstock & Ford (10)	2–4	Knaphill (9)	80
149	Alresford Town (9)	0–2	Thatcham Town (9)	80
150	Portland United (9)	0–3	Paulton Rovers (8)	221
151	Barnstaple Town (8)	1–0	Clevedon Town (9)	119
152	Tavistock (10)	2–1	Shaftesbury (9)	105
153	Bideford (8)	6–0	Wells City (9)	281
154	Cadbury Heath (9)	1–0	Yate Town (8)	162
155	Bridgwater Town (9)	1–0	Brislington (9)	192
156	Hengrove Athletic (9)	1–4	Bodmin Town (10)	50
157	Willand Rovers (9)	2–1	Bristol Manor Farm (8)	125
158	Odd Down (9)	1–0	Mangotsfield United (8)	99
159	Taunton Town (8)	3–0	Larkhall Athletic (8)	368
160	Bridport (9)	3–1	Street (9)	210
Sunday 20 August 2017
3	Pickering Town (9)	1–2	Clitheroe (8)	133
17	Hallam (10)	1–4	Atherton Collieries (8)	302
39	Worcester City (9)	1–1	Chasetown (8)	572
49	Quorn (9)	1–3	AFC Mansfield (9)	160
67	St Margaretsbury (9)	2–2	Hullbridge Sports (9)	118
91	Baldock Town (10)	3–1	North Greenford United (9)	120
99	Crawley Green (9)	2–3	Berkhamsted (9)	76
105	Highworth Town (9)	2–3	Marlow (8)	173
111	Erith & Belvedere (10)	1–4	Cray Valley Paper Mills (9)	98
124	Cray Wanderers (8)	2–3	Sevenoaks Town (9)	162
127	Littlehampton Town (9)	3–2	Eastbourne United (9)	177
132	Herne Bay (8)	2–1	Chessington & Hook United (10)	204
145	Guildford City (9)	4–0	Camberley Town (9)	163
Replays
Monday 21 August 2017
13R	Maine Road (9)	A–A	Abbey Hey (9)	-
Match abandoned in extra time due to serious injury to Abbey Hey player.
92R	Beaconsfield Town (8)	3–1	Chalfont St Peter (8)	127
Tuesday 22 August 2017
9R	Kendal Town (8)	4–1	Harrogate Railway Athletic (9)	105
10R	Marske United (9)	1–2 (a.e.t.)	Scarborough Athletic (8)	415
12R	Whitley Bay (9)	3–1	Penrith (9)	351
24R	City of Liverpool (9)	8–2	Prescot Cables (8)	956
25R	West Didsbury & Chorlton (9)	1–3	1874 Northwich (9)	304
30R	Burscough (9)	0–3	Radcliffe Borough (8)	92
32R	Market Drayton Town (8)	2–2 (4–1 p)	Sporting Khalsa (9)	145
38R	Boldmere St. Michaels (9)	5–0	Wolverhampton Casuals (10)	94
39R	Chasetown (8)	2–0	Worcester City (9)	266
52R	Belper Town (8)	1–4	Lincoln United (8)	142
54R	Spalding United (8)	0–2	Wisbech Town (9)	303
61R	Kempston Rovers (8)	4–1	Newport Pagnell Town (9)	142
64R	Peterborough Sports (8)	2–0	Eynesbury Rovers (9)	218
67R	Hullbridge Sports (9)	1–1 (4–5 p)	St Margaretsbury (9)	70
76R	Heybridge Swifts (8)	6–1	Haverhill Rovers (9)	187
82R	Haverhill Borough (9)	5–2	Ilford (9)	115
87R	Saffron Walden Town (9)	3–4	Barking (8)	343
109R	Sittingbourne (8)	0–1	Pagham (9)	152
113R	Walton & Hersham (9)	1–1 (4–5 p)	Carshalton Athletic (8)	148
115R	Shoreham (8)	3–1 (a.e.t.)	Colliers Wood United (9)	78
117R	Hythe Town (8)	1–3	Corinthian-Casuals (8)	278
119R	Glebe (9)	3–0	Deal Town (9)	136
133R	Newhaven (9)	1–4	Lewes (8)	364
135R	Faversham Town (8)	2–1	Croydon (9)	187
138R	AFC Totton (8)	5–0	Fleet Town (8)	195
139R	Wimborne Town (8)	1–2	Andover Town (9)	248
143R	Horndean (9)	3–0	Binfield (9)	91
Wednesday 23 August 2017
23R	Kidsgrove Athletic (8)	2–0	Trafford (8)	164
41R	Evesham United (8)	2–3 (a.e.t.)	Newcastle Town (8)	235
42R	Westfields (9)	1–0	AFC Wulfrunians (9)	157
80R	Romford (8)	3–1	Stowmarket Town (9)	110
101R	Aylesbury United (8)	4–1	Leverstock Green (9)	149
112R	Erith Town (9)	3–3 (4–1 p)	Whyteleafe (8)	94
Monday 28 August 2017
13R	Maine Road (9)	1–2	Abbey Hey (9)	189

== First qualifying round ==
The First qualifying round draw was held on 21 August 2017. Fixtures were played on Friday 1, Saturday 2 and Sunday 3 September 2017. All replays were completed by Wednesday 6 September 2017. 232 teams took part in this stage of the competition: 160 winners from the preliminary round and 72 entering at this stage from the three leagues at Level 7 of English football. The round included nine teams from Level 10, the lowest-ranked teams still in the competition.

Tie	Home team (Tier)	Score	Away team (Tier)	Att.
Friday 1 September 2017
3	City of Liverpool (9)	1–2	Nantwich Town (7)	1,024
47	Cambridge City (8)	3–1	St Neots Town (7)	312
95	Kingstonian (7)	3–2	Shoreham (8)	218
Saturday 2 September 2017
1	Penistone Church (9)	3–2	Whitby Town (7)	496
2	Albion Sports (9)	3–2	Barnoldswick Town (9)	124
4	Warrington Town (7)	1–0	Grimsby Borough (10)	297
5	Ashton Athletic (9)	2–1	Bamber Bridge (8)	202
6	Kidsgrove Athletic (8)	3–2	Clitheroe (8)	156
7	Stalybridge Celtic (7)	2–1	Farsley Celtic (7)	289
8	Marine (7)	1–3	Ashton United (7)	324
9	Shaw Lane (7)	3–1	Radcliffe Borough (8)	187
10	Scarborough Athletic (8)	1–0	Workington (7)	794
11	Bottesford Town (9)	0–1	Shildon (9)	141
12	Cleethorpes Town (8)	1–2	Atherton Collieries (8)	196
13	Colne (8)	0–1	Lancaster City (7)	301
14	Ossett Town (8)	2–1	Consett (9)	279
15	Hyde United (8)	1–0	Kendal Town (8)	305
16	Droylsden (8)	4–3	Colwyn Bay (8)	174
17	Abbey Hey (9)	3–3	Altrincham (7)	381
18	Skelmersdale United (8)	1–2	Handsworth Parramore (9)	165
19	Buxton (7)	3–2	Frickley Athletic (8)	242
20	Whitley Bay (9)	0–2	Newcastle Benfield (9)	608
21	Sunderland RCA (9)	0–0	Liversedge (9)	176
22	Mossley (8)	2–2	1874 Northwich (9)	355
23	Witton Albion (7)	0–2	South Shields (8)	534
24	Halesowen Town (7)	0–3	Basford United (8)	359
25	Boston Town (9)	2–0	Hednesford Town (7)	157
26	Kempston Rovers (8)	2–1	Wisbech Town (9)	161
27	Loughborough Dynamo (8)	1–3	Stourbridge (7)	262
28	Market Drayton Town (8)	1–5	Alvechurch (8)	82
29	AFC Mansfield (9)	4–0	Dunkirk (10)	130
30	Soham Town Rangers (8)	0–0	Westfields (9)	163
31	Peterborough Sports (8)	3–4	Stafford Rangers (7)	284
32	Rushall Olympic (7)	1–0	Potton United (10)	139
33	Sutton Coldfield Town (7)	0–2	Barwell (7)	186
34	St Ives Town (7)	1–0	Coalville Town (7)	203
35	Grantham Town (7)	2–1	Holbeach United (9)	302
36	Haughmond (9)	3–2	Matlock Town (7)	236
37	Tividale (10)	2–3	AFC Rushden & Diamonds (8)	325
38	Lincoln United (8)	0–1	Redditch United (7)	114
39	Shepshed Dynamo (9)	6–1	Leek Town (8)	262
41	Stratford Town (7)	4–0	Newcastle Town (8)	187
42	King's Lynn Town (7)	4–1	Coleshill Town (9)	817
43	Mickleover Sports (7)	2–1	Hinckley AFC (10)	305
44	Boldmere St. Michaels (9)	0–3	Chasetown (8)	359
45	Yaxley (9)	0–1	Dereham Town (8)	125
46	Brocton (10)	2–4	Deeping Rangers (9)	127
48	Maldon & Tiptree (8)	3–3	Hayes & Yeading United (8)	91
49	Tilbury (8)	0–1	Aylesbury United (8)	115
50	North Leigh (8)	2–2	Biggleswade Town (7)	92
53	Hendon (7)	1–1	Wingate & Finchley (7)	298
54	Beaconsfield Town (8)	0–2	Marlow (8)	218
55	Colney Heath (9)	3–0	Cockfosters (9)	140
56	Berkhamsted (9)	1–3	Slough Town (7)	366
57	Clapton (9)	0–3	Needham Market (7)	143
58	Royston Town (7)	2–0	Dunstable Town (7)	234
59	Billericay Town (7)	5–0	Didcot Town (8)	1,159
60	Bedford Town (8)	0–2	Lowestoft Town (7)	264
61	Ware (8)	2–1	Witham Town (8)	101
62	Thurrock (7)	1–1	Harlow Town (7)	159
63	Hadley (9)	2–3	FC Romania (9)	125
64	Great Yarmouth Town (9)	0–2	Chesham United (7)	277
65	Hertford Town (8)	1–1	Grays Athletic (8)	315
66	Haringey Borough (8)	1–1	Hitchin Town (7)	171
67	Potters Bar Town (8)	1–0	Bishop's Stortford (7)	181
68	Gorleston (9)	0–4	Barking (8)	192
69	Arlesey Town (8)	0–7	Heybridge Swifts (8)	163
70	AFC Sudbury (8)	1–1	Mildenhall Town (8)	239

Tie	Home team (Tier)	Score	Away team (Tier)	Att.
71	Aylesbury (8)	1–3	Leiston (7)	109
72	Hanwell Town (8)	4–1	Brightlingsea Regent (7)	142
73	St Margaretsbury (9)	1–6	Kidlington (8)	105
74	Cheshunt (8)	2–0	Takeley (9)	185
75	Haverhill Borough (9)	0–8	Kings Langley (7)	126
76	Enfield Town (7)	2–1	Harrow Borough (7)	421
78	Ashford Town (8)	2–0	Corinthian-Casuals (8)	125
79	Phoenix Sports (8)	2–0	Eastbourne Town (9)	177
80	Ramsgate (8)	3–3	Egham Town (8)	204
81	Margate (7)	3–1	East Grinstead Town (8)	458
82	Faversham Town (8)	3–1	Tonbridge Angels (7)	346
83	Crowborough Athletic (9)	2–0	Sevenoaks Town (9)	107
84	Dulwich Hamlet (7)	3–1	Hastings United (8)	1,288
85	Tooting & Mitcham United (7)	2–0	Merstham (7)	256
86	Thamesmead Town (8)	3–0	Lewes (8)	104
87	Herne Bay (8)	3–1	Walton Casuals (8)	192
88	Metropolitan Police (7)	3–2	Staines Town (7)	153
89	Folkestone Invicta (7)	3–2	Greenwich Borough (8)	351
90	Dorking Wanderers (7)	3–2	Worthing (7)	281
91	Horsham (8)	6–0	Ashford United (8)	243
92	Haywards Heath Town (9)	2–2	Tunbridge Wells (9)	202
93	Banstead Athletic (9)	0–4	Glebe (9)	73
94	Carshalton Athletic (8)	5–3	Pagham (9)	225
96	Leatherhead (7)	6–0	Cray Valley Paper Mills (9)	283
97	Erith Town (9)	0–3	Burgess Hill Town (7)	105
98	Hereford (7)	8–0	Godalming Town (9)	1,737
99	Banbury United (7)	4–2	Tiverton Town (7)	436
100	Bridport (9)	1–0	Barnstaple Town (8)	246
101	Gosport Borough (7)	1–0	Bridgwater Town (9)	250
102	Frome Town (7)	2–1	AFC Totton (8)	191
103	AFC Portchester (9)	1–0	Dorchester Town (7)	291
104	Farnborough (7)	2–3	Salisbury (8)	396
105	Odd Down (9)	0–5	Weymouth (7)	190
106	Tavistock (10)	2–2	Taunton Town (8)	380
107	Merthyr Town (7)	6–1	Willand Rovers (9)	303
108	Tuffley Rovers (9)	0–5	Swindon Supermarine (8)	221
109	Horndean (9)	0–2	Bodmin Town (10)	68
110	Paulton Rovers (8)	1–0	Winchester City (8)	129
111	Guildford City (9)	1–3	Knaphill (9)	198
112	Basingstoke Town (7)	2–2	Hartley Wintney (8)	554
113	Bideford (8)	5–1	Bishop's Cleeve (8)	231
114	Hamworthy United (9)	1–5	Thatcham Town (9)	185
115	Cinderford Town (8)	2–1	Moneyfields (8)	116
116	Andover Town (9)	1–2	Cadbury Heath (9)	309
Sunday 3 September 2017
40	Romulus (8)	0–3	Kettering Town (7)	249
51	Romford (8)	0–1	AFC Hornchurch (8)	333
52	Baldock Town (10)	4–3	Thame United (8)	161
77	Littlehampton Town (9)	2–2	Chipstead (8)	229
Replays
Monday 4 September 2017
66R	Hitchin Town (7)	1–1 (2–3 p)	Haringey Borough (8)	201
Tuesday 5 September 2017
17R	Altrincham (7)	2–1	Abbey Hey (9)	520
21R	Liversedge (9)	0–4	Sunderland RCA (9)	235
22R	1874 Northwich (9)	2–0	Mossley (8)	348
48R	Hayes & Yeading United (8)	4–3 (a.e.t.)	Maldon & Tiptree (8)	201
50R	Biggleswade Town (7)	3–2	North Leigh (8)	113
53R	Wingate & Finchley (7)	4–2 (a.e.t.)	Hendon (7)	266
62R	Harlow Town (7)	2–1	Thurrock (7)	230
70R	Mildenhall Town (8)	2–4	AFC Sudbury (8)	280
77R	Chipstead (8)	4–0	Littlehampton Town (9)	128
80R	Egham Town (8)	2–4	Ramsgate (8)	98
92R	Tunbridge Wells (9)	3–0 (a.e.t.)	Haywards Heath Town (9)	254
106R	Taunton Town (8)	1–2	Tavistock (10)	373
112R	Hartley Wintney (8)	1–0	Basingstoke Town (7)	620
Wednesday 6 September 2017
30R	Westfields (9)	1–0	Soham Town Rangers (8)	202
65R	Grays Athletic (8)	2–3 (a.e.t.)	Hertford Town (8)	232

== Second qualifying round ==
The Second qualifying round draw was held on 4 September 2017. Fixtures were played on Saturday 16 and Sunday 17 September 2017; replays concluded Tuesday 26 September 2017. 160 teams took part in this stage of the competition: 116 winners from the first qualifying round and 44 entering at this stage from the two leagues at Level 6 of English football. The round included Baldock Town, Bodmin Town and Tavistock from Level 10, the lowest-ranked teams still in the competition.

Tie	Home team (Tier)	Score	Away team (Tier)	Att.
Saturday 16 September 2017
1	Salford City (6)	1–2	York City (6)	1,350
2	Darlington (6)	0–3	South Shields (8)	1,814
3	Southport (6)	0–3	Bradford Park Avenue (6)	496
4	Ossett Town (8)	1–0	Atherton Collieries (8)	244
5	Newcastle Benfield (9)	2–1	Ashton United (7)	149
6	Warrington Town (7)	1–1	Hyde United (8)	429
7	Harrogate Town (6)	3–0	Penistone Church (9)	653
8	Spennymoor Town (6)	1–2	Gainsborough Trinity (6)	403
9	Handsworth Parramore (9)	1–1	FC United of Manchester (6)	434
11	Shildon (9)	1–0	Altrincham (7)	345
12	Scarborough Athletic (8)	2–0	Sunderland RCA (9)	932
13	Blyth Spartans (6)	1–2	Shaw Lane (7)	543
15	Stockport County (6)	1–0	Curzon Ashton (6)	1,922
16	Stalybridge Celtic (7)	1–3	Chorley (6)	551
17	Lancaster City (7)	4–0	Droylsden (8)	303
18	Stafford Rangers (7)	1–0	Tamworth (6)	782
19	Boston United (6)	1–1	Haughmond (9)	726
20	Shepshed Dynamo (9)	0–1	Nantwich Town (7)	318
21	Deeping Rangers (9)	2–4	Kidderminster Harriers (6)	696
22	AFC Mansfield (9)	0–0	Rushall Olympic (7)	110
23	Kempston Rovers (8)	0–4	Hereford (7)	429
24	Stratford Town (7)	4–1	Redditch United (7)	326
25	AFC Telford United (6)	2–0	Barwell (7)	541
26	Nuneaton Town (6)	3–1	King's Lynn Town (7)	627
27	Kettering Town (7)	2–0	Kidsgrove Athletic (8)	543
28	Basford United (8)	1–0	Mickleover Sports (7)	217
29	Alfreton Town (6)	2–2	AFC Rushden & Diamonds (8)	418
30	Westfields (9)	0–2	Leamington (6)	365
31	Grantham Town (7)	3–4	Alvechurch (8)	332
32	Buxton (7)	4–1	Chasetown (8)	314
34	Dereham Town (8)	1–2	Boston Town (9)	246
35	Leiston (7)	4–2	Crowborough Athletic (9)	234
36	Concord Rangers (6)	4–0	Tunbridge Wells (9)	191
37	Braintree Town (6)	2–2	Royston Town (7)	256
38	AFC Sudbury (8)	3–0	Chipstead (8)	169
39	Biggleswade Town (7)	0–1	East Thurrock United (6)	191
40	St Albans City (6)	3–3	Cambridge City (8)	561
41	Horsham (8)	2–5	Herne Bay (8)	200
42	Hemel Hempstead Town (6)	0–0	Wingate & Finchley (7)	377
43	Lowestoft Town (7)	0–1	Harlow Town (7)	395
44	Metropolitan Police (7)	2–2	Heybridge Swifts (8)	84
45	Chelmsford City (6)	7–0	Ramsgate (8)	578
46	Ware (8)	2–5	Leatherhead (7)	149
47	Kings Langley (7)	0–1	Margate (7)	258
49	Baldock Town (10)	1–2	Aylesbury United (8)	335
50	Hertford Town (8)	1–2	AFC Hornchurch (8)	308
51	Glebe (9)	2–2	Phoenix Sports (8)	200
53	Kingstonian (7)	0–3	Brackley Town (6)	289
54	Eastbourne Borough (6)	4–3	Carshalton Athletic (8)	438
55	Folkestone Invicta (7)	3–1	Tooting & Mitcham United (7)	335
56	Cheshunt (8)	1–3	Dorking Wanderers (7)	170
57	Wealdstone (6)	4–0	Faversham Town (8)	414
58	Colney Heath (9)	3–3	Burgess Hill Town (7)	153

Tie	Home team (Tier)	Score	Away team (Tier)	Att.
59	Welling United (6)	1–2	Haringey Borough (8)	329
60	Dartford (6)	3–1	Barking (8)	652
61	Hampton & Richmond Borough (6)	1–1	Potters Bar Town (8)	392
62	Whitehawk (6)	1–3	Oxford City (6)	295
63	Marlow (8)	0–2	Ashford Town (8)	161
64	Needham Market (7)	2–0	Chesham United (7)	166
65	Slough Town (7)	3–2	Dulwich Hamlet (7)	712
66	Hanwell Town (8)	0–0	Enfield Town (7)	210
67	Havant & Waterlooville (6)	2–1	Merthyr Town (7)	296
69	Bridport (9)	2–2	Cadbury Heath (9)	262
70	Gosport Borough (7)	1–2	Swindon Supermarine (8)	231
71	Bognor Regis Town (6)	2–1	Weston-super-Mare (6)	397
72	Cinderford Town (8)	1–0	Hartley Wintney (8)	167
73	Tavistock (10)	1–2	Frome Town (7)	410
74	Weymouth (7)	2–0	Chippenham Town (6)	609
75	Banbury United (7)	2–0	Thatcham Town (9)	450
76	Bath City (6)	6–0	Knaphill (9)	497
77	Truro City (6)	2–0	AFC Portchester (9)	302
78	Salisbury (8)	0–2	Poole Town (6)	995
79	Paulton Rovers (8)	3–2	Kidlington (8)	155
80	Gloucester City (6)	0–3	Hungerford Town (6)	275
Sunday 17 September 2017
10	Albion Sports (9)	0–4	Ashton Athletic (9)	203
14	1874 Northwich (9)	1–0	North Ferriby United (6)	439
33	Stourbridge (7)	2–0	St Ives Town (7)	765
48	Thamesmead Town (8)	1–1	Billericay Town (7)	433
52	FC Romania (9)	2–2	Hayes & Yeading United (8)	162
Wednesday 20 September 2017
68	Bodmin Town (10)	1–1	Bideford (8)	250
Replays
Monday 18 September 2017
40R	Cambridge City (8)	0–2	St Albans City (6)	276
Tuesday 19 September 2017
6R	Hyde United (8)	2–0	Warrington Town (7)	433
9R	FC United of Manchester (6)	6–2	Handsworth Parramore (9)	623
19R	Haughmond (9)	0–5	Boston United (6)	768
22R	Rushall Olympic (7)	1–2	AFC Mansfield (9)	114
29R	AFC Rushden & Diamonds (8)	1–3	Alfreton Town (6)	609
37R	Royston Town (7)	1–2	Braintree Town (6)	251
42R	Wingate & Finchley (7)	1–2 (a.e.t.)	Hemel Hempstead Town (6)	251
48R	Billericay Town (7)	5–0	Thamesmead Town (8)	771
51R	Phoenix Sports (8)	1–1 (5–4 p)	Glebe (9)	183
52R	Hayes & Yeading United (8)	2–0 (a.e.t.)	FC Romania (9)	207
58R	Burgess Hill Town (7)	3–0	Colney Heath (9)	255
61R	Potters Bar Town (8)	0–3	Hampton & Richmond Borough (6)	179
66R	Enfield Town (7)	5–0	Hanwell Town (8)	278
Wednesday 20 September 2017
69R	Cadbury Heath (9)	2–3 (a.e.t.)	Bridport (9)	203
Tuesday 26 September 2017
44R	Heybridge Swifts (8)	1–1 (4–3 p)	Metropolitan Police (7)	227
68R	Bideford (8)	1–0	Bodmin Town (10)	247

== Third qualifying round ==
The Third qualifying round draw took place on 18 September 2017. Fixtures were played on Saturday 30 September 2017; all replays were completed by Tuesday 3 October 2017. 80 winning teams from the second qualifying round took part in this stage of the competition. No additional teams entered at this stage. The round included seven teams from Level 9 of the football pyramid, which were the lowest-ranked teams still in the competition.

Tie	Home team (Tier)	Score	Away team (Tier)	Att.
Saturday 30 September 2017
13	Ashton Athletic (9)	0–1	Chorley (6)	610
1	1874 Northwich (9)	2–2	Ossett Town (8)	387
2	AFC Mansfield (9)	0–2	Boston United (6)	613
3	Stafford Rangers (7)	1–1	AFC Telford United (6)	1,137
4	Newcastle Benfield (9)	0–1	Kidderminster Harriers (6)	403
5	Nantwich Town (7)	3–1	Nuneaton Town (6)	479
6	Boston Town (9)	2–3	Hyde United (8)	410
7	Banbury United (7)	2–3	Shildon (9)	700
8	Scarborough Athletic (8)	2–2	Stratford Town (7)	1,180
9	Basford United (8)	2–3	Kettering Town (7)	541
10	Shaw Lane (7)	2–1	Lancaster City (7)	304
11	Buxton (7)	2–1	Alvechurch (8)	309
12	Stockport County (6)	3–3	FC United of Manchester (6)	3,034
14	Leamington (6)	0–0	Gainsborough Trinity (6)	459
15	Stourbridge (7)	3–1	Alfreton Town (6)	646
16	South Shields (8)	3–2	York City (6)	2,806
17	Harrogate Town (6)	0–0	Bradford Park Avenue (6)	911
18	Swindon Supermarine (8)	2–3	Paulton Rovers (8)	214
19	Enfield Town (7)	3–0	Phoenix Sports (8)	501
20	Hayes & Yeading United (8)	0–4	Havant & Waterlooville (6)	241
21	Hereford (7)	2–0	AFC Hornchurch (8)	2,440
22	Slough Town (7)	2–1	Poole Town (6)	680
23	Brackley Town (6)	4–1	Braintree Town (6)	383
24	Concord Rangers (6)	3–0	Dorking Wanderers (7)	141
25	East Thurrock United (6)	2–2	Harlow Town (7)	222
26	Chelmsford City (6)	2–1	Weymouth (7)	664

Tie	Home team (Tier)	Score	Away team (Tier)	Att.
27	Cinderford Town (8)	2–3	Hampton & Richmond Borough (6)	233
28	Oxford City (6)	4–2	Leiston (7)	185
29	Margate (7)	2–0	Herne Bay (8)	1,009
30	St Albans City (6)	2–1	Bridport (9)	683
31	Heybridge Swifts (8)	2–1	Frome Town (7)	244
32	Truro City (6)	4–1	AFC Sudbury (8)	359
33	Eastbourne Borough (6)	0–2	Bognor Regis Town (6)	762
34	Bath City (6)	3–0	Hemel Hempstead Town (6)	510
35	Needham Market (7)	1–6	Dartford (6)	379
36	Haringey Borough (8)	4–1	Bideford (8)	180
37	Folkestone Invicta (7)	2–1	Aylesbury United (8)	473
38	Hungerford Town (6)	1–1	Billericay Town (7)	507
39	Burgess Hill Town (7)	1–0	Wealdstone (6)	590
40	Ashford Town (8)	1–2	Leatherhead (7)	277
Replays
Monday 2 October 2017
17R	Bradford Park Avenue (6)	0–2	Harrogate Town (6)	393
Tuesday 3 October 2017
1R	Ossett Town (8)	0–0 (5–4 p)	1874 Northwich (9)	342
3R	AFC Telford United (6)	4–1	Stafford Rangers (7)	869
8R	Stratford Town (7)	1–4 (a.e.t.)	Scarborough Athletic (8)	498
12R	FC United of Manchester (6)	1–0	Stockport County (6)	1,688
14R	Gainsborough Trinity (6)	2–0	Leamington (6)	370
25R	Harlow Town (7)	1–2	East Thurrock United (6)	329
38R	Billericay Town (7)	6–1	Hungerford Town (6)	1,024

== Fourth qualifying round ==
The Fourth qualifying round draw took place on 2 October 2017. Fixtures were played on Saturday 14 October 2017 and Sunday 15 October 2017; all replays were completed by Tuesday 17 October 2017. 64 teams took part in this stage of the competition: 40 winners from the third qualifying round and the 24 members of the National League who entered at this stage, representing Level 5 of English football. The round included Shildon from Level 9 of the football pyramid, the lowest-ranked team still in the competition.

Tie	Home team (Tier)	Score	Away team (Tier)	Att.
Saturday 14 October 2017
28	St Albans City (6)	1–3	Boreham Wood (5)	1,418
1	FC Halifax Town (5)	1–3	Tranmere Rovers (5)	1,630
2	Solihull Moors (5)	1–1	Ossett Town (8)	415
3	South Shields (8)	1–2	Hartlepool United (5)	2,887
5	Chorley (6)	0–0	Boston United (6)	1,204
6	AFC Telford United (6)	3–1	FC United of Manchester (6)	1,451
7	Harrogate Town (6)	1–2	Gainsborough Trinity (6)	927
8	Nantwich Town (7)	1–1	Kettering Town (7)	760
9	Buxton (7)	1–2	Gateshead (5)	653
10	Guiseley (5)	6–0	Shildon (9)	772
11	AFC Fylde (5)	1–0	Wrexham (5)	1,390
12	Kidderminster Harriers (6)	2–0	Chester (5)	1,896
13	Scarborough Athletic (8)	0–2	Hyde United (8)	2,003
14	Stourbridge (7)	0–5	Macclesfield Town (5)	1,152
15	Brackley Town (6)	3–3	Billericay Town (7)	741
16	Dagenham & Redbridge (5)	0–0	Leyton Orient (5)	2,529
17	Eastleigh (5)	1–2	Hereford (7)	1,345
18	Aldershot Town (5)	1–0	Torquay United (5)	1,583
19	Bath City (6)	0–0	Chelmsford City (6)	878
20	Oxford City (6)	1–0	Bognor Regis Town (6)	406
21	Maidenhead United (5)	2–1	Havant & Waterlooville (6)	753
22	Haringey Borough (8)	2–4	Heybridge Swifts (8)	401
23	Woking (5)	1–1	Concord Rangers (6)	1,004
24	Hampton & Richmond Borough (6)	0–2	Truro City (6)	784

Tie	Home team (Tier)	Score	Away team (Tier)	Att.
25	Dover Athletic (5)	0–0	Bromley (5)	923
26	Slough Town (7)	1–0	Folkestone Invicta (7)	926
27	Burgess Hill Town (7)	0–1	Dartford (6)	873
29	Maidstone United (5)	2–2	Enfield Town (7)	1,495
30	Margate (7)	1–2	Leatherhead (7)	879
31	Paulton Rovers (8)	2–3	Sutton United (5)	601
32	East Thurrock United (6)	0–0	Ebbsfleet United (5)	669
Sunday 15 October 2017
4	Shaw Lane (7)	2–1	Barrow (5)	864
Replays
Monday 16 October 2017
19R	Chelmsford City (6)	1–0	Bath City (6)	645
Tuesday 17 October 2017
2R	Ossett Town (8)	1–2	Solihull Moors (5)	1,176
5R	Boston United (6)	3–4 (a.e.t.)	Chorley (6)	1,132
8R	Kettering Town (7)	0–1	Nantwich Town (7)	903
15R	Billericay Town (7)	2–1	Brackley Town (6)	1,464
16R	Leyton Orient (5)	1–0	Dagenham & Redbridge (5)	2,013
23R	Concord Rangers (6)	1–2 (a.e.t.)	Woking (5)	382
25R	Bromley (5)	3–0	Dover Athletic (5)	828
29R	Enfield Town (7)	1–3 (a.e.t.)	Maidstone United (5)	820
32R	Ebbsfleet United (5)	3–0	East Thurrock United (6)	866

== Competition proper ==
Winners from the fourth qualifying round advanced to the First round proper, where teams from League One (Level 3) and League Two (Level 4) of English football, operating in the English Football League, entered the competition.

== Broadcasting rights ==
The qualifying rounds aren't covered by the FA Cup's broadcasting contracts held by BBC Sport and BT Sport, although one game per round will be broadcast by the BBC on its media platforms.

The following qualifying rounds matches were broadcast live in the UK:

Round	Tie	Broadcaster
Extra preliminary round	Litherland REMYCA (10) vs A.F.C. Liverpool (9)	BBC Sport
Preliminary round	South Shields (8) vs Bridlington Town (9)	BBC Sport
First qualifying round	Billericay Town (7) vs Didcot Town (8)	BBC Sport
Second qualifying round	Deeping Rangers (9) vs Kidderminster Harriers (6)	BBC Sport
Third qualifying round	Ashton Athletic (9) vs Chorley (6)	BBC Sport
Fourth qualifying round	St Albans City (6) vs Boreham Wood (5)	BBC Sport
