= AUFC =

AUFC may refer to one of the following football clubs:

In America:

- Atlanta United FC

In Australia:

- Adelaide United FC
- Adelaide University Football Club

In England:

- Abingdon United F.C.
- Alderley United F.C.
- Ardley United F.C.
- Arlesey Athletic F.C.
- Ascot United F.C.
- Ash United F.C.
- Ashford United F.C.
- Ashton United F.C.
- Aylesbury United F.C.

In Myanmar:

- Ayeyawady United F.C.

In Scotland:

- Ayr United F.C.
- Annbank United F.C.
- Aberdeen University F.C.

In Thailand:

- Army United F.C.

In Wales:

- Aberystwyth University F.C.

Northern Ireland:

- Alton United F.C.
- Annagh United F.C.
