= Dunstable Town 98 F.C. =

English football club

Dunstable Town 98 F.C. was a football club based in Dunstable, Bedfordshire, England. They were established in 2003, as a feeder club to Dunstable Town based around the former reserve team, and joined the Spartan South Midlands Football League in 2004.

They finished as runners-up in Division Two in their first season, earning promotion to Division One. In 2005–06, they completed the league season 12th, but resigned at the end of the next season and folded.

During their existence, they played a single FA Vase game, losing a second qualifying round encounter with Wisbech Town in 2005–06.
