= Biggleswade Town F.C. =

English football club

Coordinates: 52°04′37″N 0°16′8″W

Biggleswade Town
- Full name: Biggleswade Town Football Club
- Nickname: The Waders
- Founded: 1874
- Ground: Langford Road, Biggleswade
- Capacity: 3,000 (300 seated)
- Chairman: Maurice Dorrington
- Manager: Brett Donnelly
- League: Southern League Division One Central
- 2025–26: Southern League Division One Central, 4th of 22
Home colours	Away colours

Biggleswade Town Football Club is a football club based in Biggleswade, Bedfordshire, England. The club are currently members of the Southern League Division One Central and play at Langford Road.

== History ==
The club were established in 1874 as Biggleswade, later becoming known as Biggleswade & District, and played only friendlies and cup matches until the late 1890s. In 1902 they were founder members of the Biggleswade and District League, and were its first champions, also winning the Bedfordshire Senior Cup that year. The club went on to win the league twice more before World War I, also playing in the Bedford & District League between 1909 and 1912 and winning one title.

In 1920 Biggleswade Town joined the Northamptonshire League, which became the United Counties League in 1934, and won the Bedfordshire Premier Cup in 1922–23 and 1927–28. After World War II the club adopted its current name and joined the Spartan League in 1945. They returned to the UCL in 1951, before switching to the Eastern Counties League in 1955. During their time in the ECL they set the record for biggest away win with a 12–0 victory over Newmarket Town. In 1963 they returned to the UCL due to the increasing transport costs. The 1975–76 season saw them finish bottom of the Premier Division, resulting in relegation to Division One. In 1980 they joined the Premier Division of the South Midlands League. They were relegated to Division One in 1983, but were promoted back to the Premier Division in 1987. When the Spartan and South Midlands leagues merged to form the Spartan South Midlands League in 1997 the club were placed in the Premier Division North. The following season they were placed in the Senior Division, and after finishing fifth, were promoted to the Premier Division.

In 2007–08 Biggleswade Town won the Bedfordshire Premier Cup for a third time, beating Luton Town 3–2 in the final. The following season they won the league title, earning promotion to Division One Midlands of the Southern League. In 2010 the division was renamed Division One Central, and the 2010–11 season saw Biggleswade finish fourth, qualifying for the promotion play-offs and losing 2–0 to Daventry Town in the semi-finals. In 2012–13 they finished fourth again, and in the subsequently play-offs they beat Godalming Town 2–1 in the semi-finals and Rugby Town 3–1 to earn promotion to the Premier Division. In 2014–15 the club reached the first round of the FA Cup for the first time, losing 4–1 at Stourbridge. In 2018 the club were placed in the Premier Division Central of the Southern League as a result of league reorganisation. The 2021–22 season saw them finish second-from-bottom of the Premier Division Central, resulting in relegation to Division One Central. In 2023–24 they were Division One Central champions, earning promotion back to the Premier Division Central. However, they finished bottom of the Premier Division Central the following season and were relegated back to Division One Central.

=== Season-by-season record ===
Season	League	Position	FA Cup	FA Trophy	FA Vase
2004–05	Spartan South Midlands League Premier Division	10/20	–	–	Second qualifying round
2005–06	Spartan South Midlands League Premier Division	15/20	–	–	Second qualifying round
2006–07	Spartan South Midlands League Premier Division	18/21	Preliminary round	–	Second qualifying round
2007–08	Spartan South Midlands League Premier Division	3/22	Extra preliminary round	–	Second qualifying round
2008–09	Spartan South Midlands League Premier Division	1/21	Extra preliminary round	–	Quarter finals
2009–10	Southern League Division One Midlands	12/22	Preliminary round	First qualifying round	–
2010–11	Southern League Division One Central	4/22	First qualifying round	First qualifying round	–
2011–12	Southern League Division One Central	8/22	Second qualifying round	First qualifying round	–
2012–13	Southern League Division One Central	4/22	First qualifying round	Preliminary round	–
2013–14	Southern League Premier Division	9/23	First round	First qualifying round	–
2014–15	Southern League Premier Division	19/23	Third qualifying round	Second qualifying round	–
2015–16	Southern League Premier Division	14/24	Second qualifying round	First qualifying round	–
2016–17	Southern League Premier Division	7/24	Second qualifying round	Second qualifying round	–
2017–18	Southern League Premier Division	16/24	Second qualifying round	First qualifying round	–
2018–19	Southern League Premier Division Central	7/22	First qualifying round	Second round	–
2019–20 (Note: Season was curtailed in March due to the coronavirus pandemic)	Southern League Premier Division Central	15/22	Second qualifying round	Third qualifying round	–
2020–21 (Note: Due to the government's response to the coronavirus pandemic, the season was officially curtailed in January)	Southern League Premier Division Central	16/22	First qualifying round	First round	–
2021–22	Southern League Premier Division Central	20/21	First qualifying round	First round	–
2022–23	Southern League Division One Central	7/19	Fourth qualifying round	First qualifying round	–
2023–24	Southern League Division One Central	1/19	Fourth qualifying round	First qualifying round	–

== Ground ==
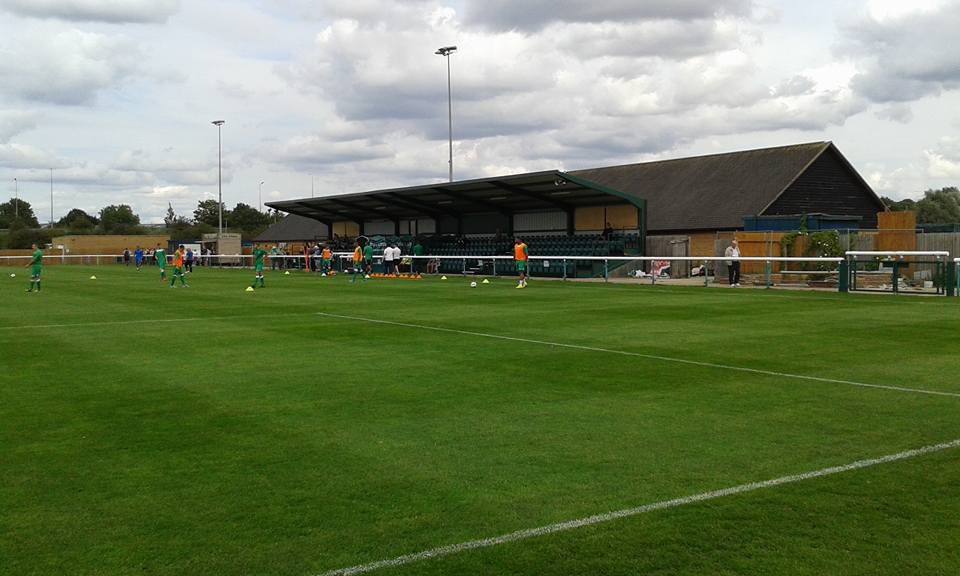
The Main Stand in July 2015

The club originally played at the Fairfield Road ground, which was shared with a local cricket club. A wooden stand was erected in the 1920s, and for several years had an Anderson shelter on either side. Floodlights were installed in 1989, and the wooden stand was demolished after being condemned in the 1990s. In 2006 the club left Fairfield Road and groundshared with Bedford United & Valerio whilst a new ground was built on Langford Road.

The new ground, named the Carlsberg Stadium for sponsorship purposes, was opened for the start of the 2008–09 season, with the first game on 13 August 2008 between Biggleswade Town and Hertford Town resulting in a 1–0 for the home team. The ground has a capacity of 3,000, of which 300 is seated.

== Managerial history ==
Years	Manager
2006–2018	(England) Chris Nunn
2018–2019	(England) Lee Allinson
2019–2022	(England) Chris Nunn
2022–2023	(England) Robbie O'Keefe
2023–2024	(England) Danny Payne
2024–	(England) Jimmy Martin

== Honours ==
- Southern League
  - Division One Central champions 2023–24
- United Counties League
  - Premier Division Cup winners 1973–74
  - Division One cup winners 1963–64, 1979–80
  - Division One Cup winners 1979–80
- South Midlands League
  - Premier Division Cup winners 1991–92
  - League Challenge Trophy winners 1992–93
  - Floodlit Cup winners 1995–96, 2002–03
- Spartan South Midlands League
  - Premier Division champions 2008–09
- Biggleswade & District League
  - Champions 1902–03
- Bedfordshire Premier Cup
  - Winners 1922–23, 1927–28, 2007–08
- Bedfordshire Senior Cup
  - Winners 1902–03, 1907–08, 1946–47, 1950–51, 1961–62, 1962–63, 1966–67, 1973–74, 2018–19
- Huntingdonshire Premier Cup
  - Winners 1992–93, 1993–94, 1997–98, 2000–01, 2002–03

== Records ==
- Best FA Cup performance: First round, 2013–14
- Best FA Trophy performance: Fourth round, 2024–25
- Best FA Vase performance: Quarter-finals, 2008–09

== See also ==
- Biggleswade Town F.C. players
