= Kentish Town F.C. =

Association football club in England

Kentish Town
- Full name: Kentish Town Football Club
- Nickname: The Townies
- Founded: 1994
- Dissolved: 2015
- Ground: Middlesex Stadium, Ruislip capacity = 3,587
- 2013–14: Spartan South Midlands League; Division One, 15th (resigned)
Home colours	Away colours

Kentish Town F.C. was an English football club affiliated to the London and Football Associations. Kentish Town took their name from an area of the London Borough of Camden called Kentish Town. The senior team were based at The Middlesex Stadium in the London Borough of Hillingdon. KTFC were wound up in 2015 following the loss of league status after losing access to their home ground following its purchase by Saracens Rugby Club. Also There are a kids club called kentish town fc.

== History ==
Originally the club was founded in 1994 as a youth football club by two parents concerned with the lack of opportunity to play competitive football in the local area. In 1995 the club played its first competitive match in the Camden & Islington Youth Midweek League. The club began senior football by joining the Spartan South Midlands League Division Two in 2003. They were promoted in their first season despite only finishing 10th in a 17-team division.

== Grounds ==
Kentish Town most recently played their home games at The Middlesex Stadium, Breakspear Road, Ruislip, HA4 7SB.

The club were a nomadic club which had had to use various grounds in and around North London.

Season	Ground	Notes
2003-04	King George IV playing fields	Barnet
2004-05	Coles Park	Home of Haringey Borough
2005-06	Park field	Home of Potters Bar Town F.C.
2006-07	Claremont Road	Home of Hendon F.C.
2007-2011	Copthall Stadium, Barnet	Ground taken over by Saracens RFC
2012 - onwards	The Middlesex Stadium, Ruislip	Home of Hillingdon Borough FC

== Season-by-season record since 2003 ==
Season	Division	Position	Notes
2003-04	Spartan South Midlands League Division Two	10	Promoted
2004-05	Spartan South Midlands League Division One	9	
2005-06	Spartan South Midlands League Division One	11	
2006-07	Spartan South Midlands League Division One	6	
2007-08	Spartan South Midlands League Division One	1	Promoted
2008-09	Spartan South Midlands League Premier Division	21	
2009-10	Spartan South Midlands League Premier Division	17	
2010-11	Spartan South Midlands League Premier Division	22	Relegated
2011-12	Spartan South Midlands League Division One	19	
2012-13	Spartan South Midlands League Division One	19	
2013-14	Spartan South Midlands League Division One	15	Folded

== Managerial history ==
Dates	Manager		
2003–04	–Piotr Malecki	2006–08	(Nigeria) Clement Temile
2008–2010	Rak Hudson		
2010 – present	(England) John Creith		

== Honours ==
=== Club honours ===
- Spartan South Midlands League
  - Division One
    - Winners (1):2007–08

== Records ==
=== FA Cup records ===
- Best performance - 2008-09 Extra Preliminary Round
  - Replay EP Wellingborough Town 2-0 Kentish Town

=== FA Vase records ===
- Best performance - 2008-09 Round 2
  - Round 2 Kentish Town 2-6 Biggleswade Town

=== Club records ===
- Biggest home victory:
  - 8-2 vs. Brache Sparta on 23 August 2006
- Biggest away victory:
  - 6-0 vs. New Bradwell St Peter on 17 November 2007
  - 6-0 vs. Brache Sparta on 26 January 2008
- Biggest home defeat:
  - 10–1 vs. Chalfont St Peter on 23 December 2008
- Biggest away defeat:
  - 8-2 vs. Harefield United on 11 April 2009
- Longest unbeaten run:
  - 9 games from 12 March to 22 April 2008

=== League records ===
- Best league position: 17th, Spartan South Midlands League Premier Division, 2009–10
- Worst league position: 10th, Spartan South Midlands League Division Two, 2003–04
