= Colney Heath F.C. =

Association football club in England

Coordinates: 51°44′30″N 0°15′39″W

Colney Heath
- Full name: Colney Heath Football Club
- Nickname: The Magpies
- Founded: 1907
- Ground: Recreation Ground, Colney Heath
- Chairman: Richard Smith
- Manager: Paul Small & Paul O'Hare
- League: Spartan South Midlands League Premier Division
- 2025–26: Spartan South Midlands League Premier Division, 13th of 20
Home colours

Colney Heath Football Club is a semi-professional football club based in Colney Heath, Hertfordshire, England. Affiliated to the Hertfordshire County Football Association, they are currently members of the Spartan South Midlands League Premier Division and play at the Recreation Ground.

== History ==
The club was established in 1907 and initially played in the Hatfield District League. After World War I they joined the Mid-Herts League, and their most successful period in the league came after World War II, with the club winning the Division One and Premier Division titles, as well as the Mid Herts Benevolent Shield (twice) and the Bingham Cox Cup. In 1953 the club moved up to Division Two of the Hertfordshire Senior County League, which they won at the first attempt to earn promotion to Division One. In 1955 the club were placed in Division One A as the league was reorganised; they went on to win the division in 1955–56 and were placed in the new Premier Division for the following season. In 1958–59 they were Premier Division champions, and the following season saw them win both the Aubrey Cup and the Hertfordshire Intermediate Cup.

In 1965–66 Colney Heath finished second-from-bottom of the Premier Division and were relegated back to Division One. They were relegated again at the end of the 1968–69 season, returning to Division Two. Another relegation in 1975–76 saw them playing in Division Three. However, after finishing as runners-up in 1979–80 the club were promoted back to Division Two. A fourth-place finish in 1983–84 was enough to see them promoted to Division One, and after finishing third in Division One in 1985–86, they returned to the Premier Division. Their first season back in the Premier Division ended in relegation to Division One, but the club were Division One champions in 1988–89, earning promotion back to the Premier Division. In 1995–96 they won the Hertfordshire Senior Centenary Trophy, which they retained the following season.

The 1999–2000 season saw Colney Heath win the Premier Division of the Hertfordshire Senior County League, resulting in promotion to the Senior Division of the Spartan South Midlands League, which was renamed Division One in 2001. They were Division One champions in 2005–06, earning promotion to the Premier Division. In 2010–11 the club won the Premier Division Cup. They won the Hertfordshire Charity Shield in 2013–14, 2017–18 and 2018–19.

In the 2019–20 season, Colney Heath were six points clear at the top of the table with a game in hand by mid-March, but the season was then abandoned due to the COVID-19 pandemic. Following the 2020–21 season, which was also curtailed due to the COVID-19 pandemic, they were promoted to Division One Central of the Southern League. However, their first season in the Southern League saw them finish second-from-bottom of Division One Central, resulting in relegation back to the Premier Division of the Spartan South Midlands League.

== Ground ==
The club played at two grounds on Coursers Road (the Meadow and the Warren) and then Fuzzen Field before moving to the Recreation Ground in 1952. The ground's clubhouse was burnt down in 1988 and was replaced with a new one the following year. Railings around the pitch were installed in 1993 and floodlights erected in 2000. The overhang of the clubhouse provides cover for two rows of seating.

== Rivalries ==
The club has a rivalry with neighbours London Colney.

== Honours ==
- Spartan South Midlands League
  - Division One champions 2005–06
  - Premier Division Cup winners 2010–11
- Hertfordshire Senior County League
  - Premier Division champions 1958–59, 1999–2000
  - Division One champions 1988–89
  - Division One A champions 1955–56
  - Division Two champions 1953–54
  - Aubrey Cup winners 1959–60
- Hertfordshire Senior Centenary Trophy
  - Winners 1995–96, 1996–97
- Hertfordshire Charity Shield
  - Winners 2013–14, 2017–18, 2018–19
- Hertfordshire Intermediate Cup
  - Winners 1959–60

== Records ==
- Best FA Cup performance: Second qualifying round, 2017–18
- Best FA Vase performance: Third round, 2013–14, 2020–21, 2026–27

== See also ==
- Colney Heath F.C. managers
