= Biggleswade United F.C. =

Association football club in England

Coordinates: 52°5′41″N 0°16′3″W

Biggleswade United
- Full name: Biggleswade United Football Club
- Nickname: United
- Founded: 16 July 1959
- Ground: Second Meadow, Biggleswade
- Capacity: 2,000 (260 seated)
- Director of Football: Tim Browne
- Chairman: Guillem Balagué
- Manager: Kane Dougherty
- League: Spartan South Midlands League Premier Division
- 2025–26: Spartan South Midlands League Premier Division, 6th of 20
- Website: biggleswadeutd.com
Home colours	Away colours

Biggleswade United Football Club is a football club based in Biggleswade, England. Affiliated to the Bedfordshire County Football Association, they are currently members of the Spartan South Midlands League Premier Division and play at Second Meadow.

== History ==
The modern club was established on 16 July 1959, although there was an earlier club by the same name in the 1920s. They joined Division Three of the North Hertfordshire League, and played in the league until joining Division One of the South Midlands League in 1969.

The club struggled in the league, finishing bottom of Division One in 1979–80, 1981–82, 1982–83 and 1983–84, after which they dropped into Division Two of the Hertfordshire Senior County League; during their fifteen seasons in the South Midlands League, they finishing in the bottom half of the table in every season.

In 1986 the club switched to the Bedford & District League. After winning the Aubrey Tingey Memorial Cup in 1988–89, they went on to win Division Two in 1990–91 (a season in which they also won the Diamond Jubilee Cup) and were Division One champions the following season. The first of three consecutive Britannia Cups was won in 1993–94, and the club won back-to-back Premier Division titles in 1994–95 and 1995–96, after which they were promoted back to Division One of the South Midlands League.

After winning Division One and the Division One Cup in their first season in the league, the club were placed in the Senior Division of the new Spartan South Midlands League, the result of a merger with the Spartan League; this was renamed Division One in 2001. In 2001–02 the club won the Bedfordshire Senior Cup, and in 2003–04 they won the Bedfordshire Senior Trophy. After finishing third in 2004–05 (a season in which they also won the Division One Cup), they were promoted to the Premier Division. The following season they won the Senior Cup for a second time.

In late October 2014 Spanish football journalist Guillem Balagué responded to an email request from club chairman Chris Lewis, through which Balagué accepted the role as Director of Football; Balagué's influence led to the signing of former Espanyol and Chelsea midfielder Enrique de Lucas. At the end of the 2020–21 season the club were transferred to the Premier Division South of the United Counties League. They were moved back to the Premier Division of the Spartan South Midlands League a year later. In 2024–25 the club won the league's Premier Division Cup, beating Milton Keynes Irish 3–1 in the final.

== Ground ==
The club have played at Second Meadow on Fairfield Road since reforming in 1959, with the ground having been used by the previous incarnation of the club. Bigglewade Town's Fairfield Road ground was located next door until they moved in 2006.

A stand with a mixture of bench seating and standing was opened in 1998, and floodlights installed in 1999. In 2009 the 260-seat Steve Matthews stand was opened. In 2020 the North Stand was named after longtime club president and former player Peter Dean. The ground currently has a capacity of 2,000. The largest stand is named after the club's most successful manager, Brian Swords.

== Honours ==
- Spartan South Midlands League
  - Premier Division Cup winners 2024–25
  - Division One Cup winners 2004–05
- South Midlands League
  - Division One champions 1996–97
  - Division One Cup winners 1996–97
- Bedford & District League
  - Premier Division champions 1994–95, 1995–96
  - Division One champions 1991–92
  - Division Two champions 1990–91
  - Britannia Cup winners 1993–94, 1994–95, 1995–96
  - Aubrey Tingey Memorial Cup winners 1988–89
  - Diamond Jubilee Cup winners 1990–91
- Bedfordshire Senior Cup
  - Winners 2001–02, 2005–06
- Bedfordshire Senior Trophy
  - Winners 2003–04
- Bedfordshire Intermediate Cup
  - Winners 1995–96, 1996–67

== Records ==
- Best FA Cup performance: First qualifying round, 2005–06, 2008–09, 2013–14, 2014–15, 2015–16, 2016–17
- Best FA Vase performance: Fourth round, 2022–23
- Record attendance: 303 vs AFC Dunstable, Spartan South Midlands League Premier Division, 2 January 2016

== See also ==
- Biggleswade United F.C. players
