= Arlesey Athletic F.C. =

Arlesey Athletic
- Full name: Arlesey Athletic Football Club
- Nickname(s): The Ath
- Founded: 2003
- Dissolved: 2009
- Ground: Hitchin Road, Arlesey
- Capacity: 2950
- 2008–09: Spartan South Midlands League; Division One, 17th
Home colours	Away colours

Arlesey Athletic F.C. was a football club based in Arlesey, Bedfordshire, England. In their last season they played in the Spartan South Midlands Football League Division One.

== History ==
The club was formed in 2003 joining the Spartan South Midlands League Division Two, and groundsharing the Hitchin Road ground of Isthmian League club Arlesey Town. In their first season, 2003–04 they finished third and were promoted to Division One, where they played for the remainder of their existence, their highest league position coming in the 2005–06 season, when they finished in sixth place. In four FA Vase matches they failed to win a game.

Players Mark Phillips and Daniel Lane were appointed joint managers on 11 November 2007. They did not appear to be affiliated to a league for the 2009–10 season, after resigning from the Spartan South Midlands League.

== Honours ==
- Cups
  - North Beds Charity Cup runners-up (1): 2004–05

== Player awards ==
As of July 2008

- 2006–07 season
  - Managers Player – Chris Reeves
  - Players Player – Scotty Waters
- 2007–08 season
  - Managers Player – Steve Bannister
  - Players Player – Terry Lock
