= Sun Sports Watford F.C. =

Association football club in England

Coordinates: 51°40′10″N 0°25′28″W

Sun Sports Club
- Full name: Sun Sports Football Club
- Nickname: The Sun
- Founded: 1901 (as Sun Sports)
- Ground: Sun Sports Club
- Capacity: 500 (35 seated)
- Chairman: Nick Simmonds
- Manager: Dave Barnes
- League: Spartan South Midlands League Division Two
- 2025–26: Herts County League Division Three, 9th of 11
- Website: www.pitchero.com/clubs/sunsportsfc
Home colours	Away colours

Sun Sports Watford Football Club are a football club based in Watford, Hertfordshire, England. They were established in 1901 and joined the Herts Senior County League in 1947. They are currently members of the Spartan South Midlands League Division Two.

== History ==
Founded as Sun Engraving in 1898, the club then went under the name Sun Sports FC in 1901 and played in the Watford & District League and West Herts League.

The club joined Herts County League Division Two in 1947–48 and were promoted to the division one in 1955–56. A season later they were in the premier division as a result of a league restructure, relegated a year later, but returned again the following season. They then spent their time in the premier division when they were relegated in 1980, three seasons after making their debut in the FA vase. Once again on the first time of asking they were promoted back to the top division. Eleven seasons later in the 1992–93 season the club won the league and repeated this feat a season later.

In 1995 club changed its name to Sun Postal Sports when they amalgamated with local football team Watford Postal Services F.C. After finishing runners-up for two seasons in a row the club joined the Spartan South Midlands League Division One in the 2003–04 season.

The 2013–14 season saw the club finish as champions of Spartan South Midlands League Division One and gain promotion to the Premier Division. At the same time they reverted to their current name.

The club also have a number of youth teams under the name of Sun Sports Youth F.C.

Sun Sports pulled out of the Spartan South Midlands League in September 2017 as they were no longer able to play at their home ground, with a proposed groundshare at Kings Langley rejected by Kings Langley's league, the Southern Football League. The following season they entered the Herts Senior County League, but again pulled out early and their results were expunged after 17 games. They re-entered the HSCL in the 2020–21 season as Sun Sports Watford.

== Current coaching staff ==
As of 28th July 2026

Position	Staff
Manager	Dave Barnes
Assistant Manager	Steve Kelly
Coach	Luke Fox
Coach	Mark Fox
Physio	Andy Navarro
Kitman	Archie Kelly

== Stadium ==
Sun Sports play their games at Sun Postal Sports & Social Club, Bellmountwood Avenue, Watford, WD17 3BN.

The ground was developed to senior status in December 2003 and was officially opened by local MP Claire Ward.

== Honours and achievements ==
=== League honours ===
- Spartan South Midlands League Division One:
  - Winners (1): 2013–14
- Herts Senior County League:
  - Winners (2): 1992–93, 1993–94
  - Runners-up (4): 1967–68, 1994–95, 2001–02, 2002–03
- Herts County League Division One:
  - Runners-up (2): 1959–60, 1980–81

=== Cup honours ===
- Herts Intermediate Cup:
  - Winners (1): 1925–26
- Herts Junior Cup:
  - Winners (1): 1938–39
- Aubrey Cup:
  - Winners (1): 1994–95
  - Runners-up (2): 1999–00, 2001–02
- Apsley Senior Cup:
  - Winners (1): 1981–82
- Apsley Junior Cup:
  - Winners (2): 1982–83, 1992–93
- West Herts St Marys Cup:
  - Runners Up (2): 1998–99, 2015–16

== Records ==
- Highest league position: 5th in Spartan South Midlands League Premier Division: 2014–15
- FA Vase best performance: First round: 1978–79, 1989–90, 2007–08
- FA Cup best performance: First round qualifying: 2016–17
