= Aylesbury Vale Dynamos F.C. =

Association football club in England

Coordinates: 51.8307°N 0.8439°W

Aylesbury Vale Dynamos
- Full name: Aylesbury Vale Dynamos Football Club
- Nickname: The Dynamos
- Founded: 1930s
- Ground: The Greenfleets Stadium, Haywood Way, Aylesbury
- Chairman: Mike Borrett
- Manager: Scott Reynolds
- League: Spartan South Midlands League Premier Division
- 2025–26: Spartan South Midlands League Premier Division, 14th of 20
Home colours	Away colours

Aylesbury Vale Dynamos Football Club is a football club based in Aylesbury, Buckinghamshire, England. They are currently members of the Spartan South Midlands League Premier Division and play at Haywood Way.

== History ==
The club was established in the 1930s as Negretti and Zambra, a works team for the Negretti and Zambra company in the King's Cross area of London. When the company relocated to the Stocklake Industrial Estate in Aylesbury in 1949, facilities were set up for the sports teams and the club joined the Aylesbury & District League in 1954.

The company later sold the sports facilities to the council, at which point the club was renamed Stocklake. After several successful years in the Aylesbury & District League, the club moved up to the Wycombe & District League, where they remained until being promoted to Division One of the Chiltonian League in 1988. They finished as runners-up in 1989–90, earning promotion to the Premier Division. Their first season in the Premier Division saw them take the runners-up position, a feat they repeated in 1996–97. They also won the Wycombe Senior Cup in 1995. In the summer of 2000 the league merged into the Hellenic League but Stocklake chose to join Division One of the Spartan South Midlands League instead. In the same year the club merged with Belgrave F.C. and was renamed again, this time becoming Haywood United.

The 2001–02 season saw them finish as runners-up in a renamed Division Two, earning promotion to Division One. After winning the Division One title in 2003–04, they were promoted to the Premier Division. In 2005 another name change saw the club become Aylesbury Vale, although this only lasted until 2009 when the dropped the 'Vale' part. Their first season as Aylesbury saw them win the Premier Division title, earning promotion to Division One Central of the Southern League, as well as winning the League Cup. A third-place finish in Division One Central in 2014–15 saw them qualify for the promotion play-offs, in which they lost 2–1 to Bedworth United in the semi-finals. In 2015–16 they won the Berks & Bucks Senior Cup, beating Chesham United 1–0 in the final.

Aylesbury finished second from bottom of Division One Central in 2018–19 and were relegated to the Premier Division of the Spartan South Midlands League; however, the club would have been demoted if they had finished in a higher position due to their changing rooms being below regulation size. During the close season the club merged with Bedgrove Dynamos and were renamed Aylesbury Vale Dynamos.

== Ground ==
After moving to Aylesbury, the club played at the sports facilities on the Stocklake Industrial Estate until 1987, when they moved to their Haywood Way ground. Floodlights were erected during the 2001–02 season.

== Honours ==
- Spartan South Midlands League
  - Premier Division champions: 2009–10
  - Division One champions 2003–04
  - League Cup winners 2009–10
- Wycombe Senior Cup
  - Winners: 1994–95
- Buckingham Charity Cup
  - Winners 2005–06
- Aylesbury & District Thomas Field Shield
  - Winners 1999–2000
- Berks & Bucks Senior Cup
  - Winners 2015–16

== Records ==
- Best FA Cup performance: Fourth qualifying round, 2009–10
- Best FA Trophy performance: First qualifying round, 2010–11, 2011–12
- Best FA Vase performance: Third round, 2008–09

== See also ==
- Aylesbury Vale Dynamos F.C. players
- Aylesbury Vale Dynamos F.C. managers
