= St Margaretsbury F.C. =

Association football club in England

Coordinates: 51°47′04.69″N 0°00′06.09″W

St Margaretsbury
- Full name: St Margaretsbury Football Club
- Nickname: The Bury
- Founded: 1894
- Ground: Recreation Ground, Stanstead Abbotts
- Capacity: 1,000 (60 seated)
- Manager: Michael Sharman
- League: Herts County League Premier Division
- 2024–25: Eastern Counties League Division One South, 20th of 20 (relegated)
Home colours	Away colours

St Margaretsbury Football Club is a football club based in Stanstead Abbotts, near Ware, Hertfordshire, England. They are currently members of the Herts County League Premier Division and play at the Recreation Ground.

== History ==
The club was established in 1894 as Stanstead Abbots. They joined the East Herts League, later transferring to the Hertford & District League. In 1921 the club entered the North & East Division of the Hertfordshire Senior County League. In 1923 the league was reduced to a single division, and in 1925 it was disbanded. The club then returned to the district leagues, including the Waltham & District League, before rejoining the Hertfordshire Senior County League in 1947, becoming members of Division Two. They went on to win the Division Two title in 1948–49, earning promotion to Division One.

Stanstead Abbots remained in Division One until 1955, when they were placed in Division One B for a transitional season. After finishing seventh of the twelve clubs, they were placed in Division One (now the second tier below the Premier Division) for the following season. In 1962 the club were renamed St Margaretsbury after moving to the St Margaretsbury Recreation Ground. After finishing as runners-up in Division One in 1969–70, they were promoted to the Premier Division, where they remained until being relegated at the end of the 1973–74 season, having finished second-from-bottom of the division. In 1977–78 the club finished third in Division One and were promoted to the Premier Division.

St Margaretsbury were relegated to Division One at the end of the 1987–88 season, but were promoted back to the Premier Division after finishing third in Division One in 1990–91. In 1992 the club moved up to the Premier Division of the Spartan League. After winning the Herts Senior Centenary Trophy in 1992–93, they were Premier Division runners-up in 1994–95, before winning the league title the following season. When the league merged with the South Midlands League to form the Spartan South Midlands League in 1997, the club were placed in the Premier South Division for a transitional season that ended with a ninth-place finish (enough to secure a place in the Premier Division for the following season) and victory in the final of the Herts Charity Shield.

Prior to the 2018–19 season, due to regional changes imposed by the FA, St Margaretsbury fell into a different catchment area and were transferred from the Spartan South Midlands League to the Essex Senior League. They finished second-from-bottom of the Essex Senior League in 2021–22 and were relegated to Division One South of the Eastern Counties League.

== Ground ==
The club originally played at Mill Field in Stanstead Abbots, before moving to the Recreation Ground in 1962. The site had originally been owned by the Croft family, who sold it to the parish councils of Stanstead Abbotts, Great Amwell and St Margarets with the requirement that it be used for sport and recreation. The club initially shared a pitch with the cricket club, meaning that only three sides were railed off for spectators, with facilities limited to a single wooden stand. However, in the mid-2000s the football club moved to a new pitch nearby, installing two seated stands and floodlights.

== Honours ==
- Spartan League
  - Premier Division champions 1995–96
- Hertfordshire Senior County League
  - Division Two champions 1948–49
- Herts Senior Centenary Trophy
  - Winners 1992–93
- Herts Charity Shield
  - Winners 1997–98

== Records ==
- Best FA Cup performance: Third qualifying round, 2001–02, 2003–04
- Best FA Vase performance: Third round, 1985–86, 2014–15, 2016–17
- Record attendance: 450 vs Stafford Rangers, FA Cup third qualifying round, 2001–02
