= Crawley Green F.C. =

Association football club in England

Coordinates: 51.8710°N 0.4021°W

Crawley Green
- Full name: Crawley Green Football Club
- Founded: 1992
- Ground: The Brache, Luton
- Capacity: 4,000 (160 seated)
- Chairman: James Sherlock
- Manager: Paul Blackman
- League: Spartan South Midlands League Division One
- 2025–26: Spartan South Midlands League Premier Division, 20th of 20 (relegated)
Home colours

Crawley Green Football Club is a football club based in Crawley Green, an area of Luton, Bedfordshire England. Affiliated to the Bedfordshire County Football Association, they are currently members of the Spartan South Midlands League Division One and play at the Brache.

== History ==
The club was established in November 1989 by a merger of three Sunday league clubs, Ramridge Rangers, Stopsley Harriers and The Wyvern. After absorbing Somerset Tavern in 1992, the club established a Saturday team. They joined Division One of the South Midlands League in 1995, and when the league merged with the Spartan League to form the Spartan South Midlands League in 1997, they were placed in Division One North. However, they left the league at the end of the 1997–98 season.

In 1999 the club rejoined the Spartan South Midlands League, and were placed in Division One, which was renamed Division Two in 2001. They won the Division in 2004–05, but were not promoted. In 2007–08 they finished as runners-up and were promoted to Division One. In 2011–12 they won the Division One Cup. They won it again in 2015–16. The season also saw them finish second in the league and earning promotion to the Premier Division.

== Ground ==
After the club's formation, they obtained a 99-year lease on the Crawley Green Sports & Social Club. A new clubhouse was built and opened by Luton Town manager David Pleat on 9 June 1992. However, the first team were later forced to groundshare at Barton Rovers due a lack of floodlights, although the reserves still play at the Sports & Social Club. Unable to upgrade the Sports & Social Centre, in 2018 the club moved back to Luton to play at the Brache, Luton Town's training ground. The Brache had previously been used by Vauxhall Motors (Luton) until an artificial pitch was installed for hockey in 1991, forcing the club to resign from the Isthmian League; the pitch was later upgraded to 3G astroturf. A wooden stand remains in place from the Vauxhall Motors era.

== Honours ==
- Spartan South Midlands League
  - Division Two champions 2004–05
  - Division One Cup winners 2011–12, 2015–16
- Bedfordshire Senior Trophy
  - Winners 2004–05, 2009–10, 2014–15

== Records ==
- Best FA Cup performance: First qualifying round, 2010–11
- Best FA Vase performance: Second round, 2023–24
