= Holmer Green F.C. =

Association football club in England

Coordinates: 51°40′05″N 0°42′12″W

Holmer Green
- Full name: Holmer Green Football Club
- Nickname: The Greens
- Founded: 1908; 118 years ago
- Ground: Watchet Lane, Holmer Green
- Chairman: Rob Shed
- Manager: Keith Scott
- League: Combined Counties League Division One
- 2024–25: Combined Counties League Division One, 7th of 23
Home colours	Away colours

Holmer Green Football Club is a football club based in the village of Holmer Green near High Wycombe in Buckinghamshire, England. Founded in 1908, the club is affiliated with the Berks & Bucks Football Association. Holmer Green were founder members of the Chiltonian League in 1984 and currently compete in the Combined Counties League Division One. The first team is managed by former Premier League striker Keith Scott.

The club operates a large community football structure, including youth, development and women’s teams, and holds England Football Two‑Star Accreditation, recognising high standards in coaching, governance and safeguarding.

== History ==
=== Early years (1908–1970s) ===
Holmer Green Football Club was established in 1908 and began playing in the Chesham & District League. In 1934 the club joined the Wycombe Combination League. Their first major honour came in 1953 with victory in the Berks & Bucks Junior Cup. Further Junior Cup success followed in 1965, alongside three wins in the Chesham Charity Cup during the 1960s.

The 1970s marked a period of sustained progress. Under manager Norman King, Holmer Green won the Wycombe League title in 1972 and 1974. In 1975 the club moved to the newly built Holmer Green Sports Association complex at Watchet Lane, coinciding with victory in the Wycombe Senior Cup. Two years later, the club won the Berks & Bucks Intermediate Cup, earning senior status.

=== Growth and league progression (1980s–1990s) ===
Holmer Green were founder members of the Chiltonian League in 1984, winning the Premier Division in both 1984–85 and 1985–86. Further league and cup success followed in the early 1990s, including the Wycombe Senior Cup and a third‑place league finish in 1991.

In 1995 the club sought to move into the South Midlands League but were initially denied permission by the Chiltonian League. After a series of FA tribunals and appeals, Holmer Green were admitted to the South Midlands League Senior Division shortly before the start of the 1995–96 season. They won the Senior Division title at the first attempt and reached the semi‑finals of the Berks & Bucks Senior Trophy.

The club continued to progress, winning the Senior Division Cup in 1996–97 and 1997–98. Following the merger of the Spartan and South Midlands Leagues in 1997–98, Holmer Green were placed in the Senior Division of the new Spartan South Midlands League. They won the division on goal difference in 1998–99, earning promotion to the Premier Division.

=== 2000s and centenary celebrations ===
Holmer Green played their first FA Cup match in 2000–01, losing 6–1 to Uxbridge. In 2008 the club celebrated its centenary with a friendly against Wycombe Wanderers, attracting a record crowd of more than 800 spectators.

The club were relegated in 2009 but immediately returned as champions of the Spartan South Midlands League Division One in 2009–10.

=== Recent years (2010s–present) ===
Holmer Green remained in the Spartan South Midlands League Premier Division until the end of the 2017–18 season, when they were moved laterally into the Hellenic League as part of an FA reorganisation. Manager Chris Allen stepped down in 2019 after ten years in charge, with Dave Lynch appointed for the 2019–20 season. Lynch was replaced by Matt Stowell later that year.

The 2019–20 and 2020–21 seasons were curtailed due to the COVID‑19 pandemic. In 2021 the club returned to the Spartan South Midlands League, but were relegated to Division One at the end of the 2021–22 season. A series of managerial changes followed, with Paul Batchelor appointed in 2022 and successfully avoiding relegation before departing for Aylesbury Vale Dynamos.

For the 2023–24 season Holmer Green were placed in the Combined Counties League Division One. Tranell Richardson began the season as manager before being replaced in September 2023 by former Premier League striker Keith Scott.

== Ground ==
Holmer Green play at Watchet Lane, Holmer Green, Buckinghamshire, HP15 6UF. The club moved to the ground in 1975, having previously played at Holmer Green Common.

A covered stand was added in 1995, the same year that Wycombe Wanderers began using the ground as a training base. The England Youth Team, England Women’s Team and several international under‑21 sides have also used the facilities.

Floodlights were installed in 1997, enabling the club to meet the requirements for promotion to the Spartan South Midlands Premier Division.

The ground was featured in David Bauckham’s book Dugouts, noted for the distinctive “Please do not swear” sign painted on the back of the dugouts.

== Club structure ==
Holmer Green FC operates a large community football programme, including:

- First Team
- Development Team
- Allied Counties Under‑18s
- Women’s Team
- Junior teams from Under‑7 to Under‑18
- A long‑running annual junior tournament

The club holds England Football Two‑Star Accreditation, recognising high standards in coaching, administration and safeguarding.

== Honours ==
- Spartan South Midlands League Senior Division
  - Winners: 1998–99
- Spartan South Midlands League Division One
  - Winners: 2009–10
- South Midlands League Senior Division
  - Winners: 1995–96
  - Runners‑up: 1996–97
- Chiltonian League Premier Division
  - Winners: 1984–85, 1985–86, 1993–94
  - Runners‑up: 1994–95
- Wycombe League
  - Winners: 1971–72, 1973–74, 1976–77, 1980–81
  - Runners‑up: 1972–73, 1975–76, 1977–78
- Berks & Bucks Senior Trophy
  - Runners‑up: 1998–99
- South Midlands League Senior Division Cup
  - Winners: 1996–97, 1997–98
- Spartan South Midlands League Challenge Trophy
  - Runners‑up: 1998–99
- Berks & Bucks Intermediate Cup
  - Winners: 1976–77
- Berks & Bucks Junior Cup
  - Winners: 1952–53, 1964–65
- Wycombe League Cup
  - Winners: 1980–81
  - Runners‑up: 1982–83

== Records ==
- Highest league position: 6th in Spartan South Midlands League Premier Division (2000–01)
- FA Cup best performance: First Qualifying Round (2004–05)
- FA Vase best performance: Second Round (2016–17)
- Highest attendance: 800 vs Wycombe Wanderers (2008, friendly)
