= AFC Dunstable =

English football club

Coordinates: 51°53′34.429″N 0°32′20.951″W

- Full name: Association Football Club; Dunstable
- Nickname: The OD's
- Founded: 1981 (as Old Dunstablians)
- Dissolved: 2026
- Ground: Creasey Park, Dunstable
| Home colours | Away colours |

AFC Dunstable was a football club based in Dunstable, Bedfordshire, England.

== History ==
The club was established in 1981 as Old Dunstablians, named after a club for former pupils of Dunstable Grammar School. The new club played at Manshead School, which had succeeded the grammar school. They initially played in the Dunstable Alliance Football League, before joining the Luton District and South Bedfordshire League in 1983. In 1989–90 the club won the Bedfordshire Junior Cup.

In 1994 the club moved to Totternhoe, when Dunstable Town Cricket Club opened a new sports facility in the village. The new ground allowed the club to join Division One of the South Midlands League in 1995. In 1997 the league merged with the Spartan League to form the Spartan South Midlands League, with the club placed in Division One North. In 2001–02 they won the Division One Cup, and in 2003–04 were champions of the renamed Division Two. However, failure to achieve the ground grading regulations meant that the club was unable to take promotion.

In 2004 the club changed their name to AFC Dunstable, although reference to the former name was retained in the club's nickname of the OD's. After winning Division Two again in 2006–07, a season in which they also won the Division Two Cup and the Bedfordshire Senior Trophy the club were again refused promotion. They won the Senior Trophy for a second time in 2007–08, and after finishing third in Division Two 2008–09 and moving to Creasey Park, they were promoted to Division One. In 2010–11 AFC Dunstable finished as runners-up in Division One and won the Division One Cup, earning promotion to the Premier Division. In 2015–16 they won the Premier Division and were promoted to Division One Central of the Southern League. In 2016–17 the club won the Bedfordshire Senior Cup, defeating Dunstable Town 2–0 in the final, going on to defeat Luton Town by the same scoreline in the Bedfordshire Premier Cup final.

The 2017–18 season saw Dunstable finish fifth in the renamed Division One East, qualifying for the promotion play-offs. However, they were beaten 2–0 in the semi-finals by Hartley Wintney. The division was renamed Division One Central again the following season. The club finished third in 2021–22, subsequently losing their play-off semi-final against Ware on penalties after the game had ended 0–0. Another third place finish in 2023–24 was followed by another play-off semi-final defeat on penalties, this time by Waltham Abbey. At the end of the 2025–26 season the club merged with Dunstable Town to form Dunstable FC.

== Honours ==
- Spartan South Midlands League
  - Premier Division champions 2015–16
  - Division Two champions 2003–04, 2006–07
  - Division One Cup winners 2001–02, 2010–11
  - Division Two Cup winners, 2006–07
- Bedfordshire Senior Cup
  - Winners 2016–17
  - Winners 2024–25
- Bedfordshire Premier Cup
  - Winners 2016–17
- Bedfordshire Senior Trophy
  - Winners 2006–07, 2007–08
- Bedfordshire Junior Cup
  - Winners 1989–90

== Records ==
- Best FA Cup performance: Third qualifying round, 2020–21
- Best FA Trophy performance: First round, 2022–23
- Best FA Vase performance: Fourth round 2015–16
- Most appearances: BJ Christie
- Most goals: BJ Christie
