= Omar Rowe =

English footballer

Personal information
- Full name: Omar Reiss Rowe
- Date of birth: 30 October 1994 (age 32)
- Place of birth: Hackney, London, England
- Height: 1.72 m (5 ft 8 in)
- Position: Winger

Team information
- Current team: Canvey Island

Youth career
- West Ham United
- Southampton

Senior career*
| Years | Team | Apps | (Gls) |
| 2013–2015 | Southampton | 0 | (0) |
| 2015 | Tower Hamlets | 9 | (5) |
| 2015–2016 | Bishop's Stortford | 7 | (0) |
| 2016 | Woodford Town | 2 | (2) |
| 2016 | Tower Hamlets | 3 | (0) |
| 2016–2017 | APOEL | 0 | (0) |
| 2016–2017 | → Ethnikos Latsion (loan) | 24 | (17) |
| 2017–2018 | Ayia Napa | | |
| 2018–2019 | Enosis Neon Paralimni | 3 | (1) |
| 2019 | Ayia Napa | | |
| 2019–2022 | Hayes & Yeading United | 59 | (18) |
| 2020 | → Hemel Hempstead Town (loan) | 6 | (2) |
| 2022–2023 | Farnborough | 12 | (0) |
| 2022–2023 | → Chesham United (loan) | 18 | (1) |
| 2023–2024 | Hayes & Yeading United | 26 | (4) |
| 2024–2026 | Chesham United | 37 | (1) |
| 2025 | → Chertsey Town (dual-registration) | 2 | (0) |
| 2025 | → Northwood (dual-registration) | 3 | (0) |
| 2025 | → Risborough Rangers (dual-registration) | 1 | (0) |
| 2025 | → Uxbridge (dual-registration) | 0 | (0) |
| 2025 | → Northwood (dual-registration) | 6 | (0) |
| 2026– | Canvey Island | 3 | (0) |
- * Club domestic league appearances and goals as of 11:14, 16 September 2026 (UTC)

Omar Reiss Rowe (born 30 October 1994) is an English footballer who plays as a winger for Canvey Island.

== Club career ==
Rowe was born in Hackney, London, and spent the first part of his youth development at West Ham United, but moved to Southampton at under-16 level. Along with goalkeeper Will Britt, he signed his professional deal with Southampton on 1 July 2013. He made his debut for the club in the Second Round of the League Cup against Barnsley on 27 August 2013, replacing Lloyd Isgrove in the 72nd minute of a 5–1 away win.

At the start of the 2015–16 season, he joined Essex Senior League club Tower Hamlets on a part-time basis. On 15 October 2015, Rowe joined National League South club Bishop's Stortford. His contract with Bishop's Stortford was terminated in January 2016. In February 2016, Rowe appeared for Woodford Town, making two league appearances, scoring twice against Wodson Park and Southall.

In 2016, Rowe arrived in Cyprus, joining APOEL and began playing football at Cypriot Third Division club Ethnikos Latsion on a season-long loan, before moving up a tier a year later to play for Ayia Napa. In 2018, Rowe signed for newly promoted Cypriot First Division club Enosis Neon Paralimni.

He rejoined Ayia Napa in January 2019, making his second debut as a substitute in the 1–0 loss to Anagennisi Deryneia on 5 January.

In summer 2019, Rowe returned to England and joined Hayes & Yeading United.

In November 2020, Rowe joined National League South side Hemel Hempstead Town on a one-month loan deal.

After three years at Hayes & Yeading, Rowe joined newly-promoted National League South side, Farnborough ahead of the 2022–23 campaign.

In December 2022, Rowe joined Chesham United on loan until the end of the season.

Ahead of the 2023–24 campaign, following his release from Farnborough, Rowe returned to Hayes & Yeading United.

Ahead of the 2024–25 season, Rowe returned to Chesham for their debut National League South campaign. Rowe joined Northwood on dual-registration in March 2025, after a similar stint with Chertsey Town. During the 2025–26 season, Rowe went out on dual-registration deals to Risborough Rangers, Uxbridge and Northwood.

In the summer of 2026, after departing Chesham, Rowe signed for Canvey Island.

== Personal life ==
Rowe's brother O'Neal Rowe played alongside him at Tower Hamlets and Woodford Town. Rowe's younger brother, Aaron, plays for Gillingham. He is of Jamaican descent.

== Career statistics ==
As of match played 12 September 2023.

Appearances and goals by club, season and competition
| Club | Season | League | | | FA Cup | | League Cup | | Other | | Total | |
| Club | Season | Division | Apps | Goals | Apps | Goals | Apps | Goals | Apps | Goals | Apps | Goals |
|---|---|---|---|---|---|---|---|---|---|---|---|---|
| Southampton | 2013–14 | Premier League | 0 | 0 | 0 | 0 | 2 | 0 | — | | 2 | 0 |
| Southampton | 2014–15 | Premier League | 0 | 0 | 0 | 0 | 0 | 0 | — | | 0 | 0 |
| Southampton | Total | | 0 | 0 | 0 | 0 | 2 | 0 | — | | 2 | 0 |
| Tower Hamlets | 2015–16 | Essex Senior League | 9 | 5 | 0 | 0 | — | | 0 | 0 | 9 | 5 |
| Bishop's Stortford | 2015–16 | National League South | 7 | 0 | — | | — | | 1 (Note: Appearance in the FA Trophy) | 0 | 8 | 0 |
| Woodford Town | 2015–16 | Spartan South Midlands League Division One | 2 | 2 | — | | — | | 1 (Note: Appearance in the Spartan South Midlands League Challenge Trophy) | 0 | 3 | 2 |
| Tower Hamlets | 2016–17 | Essex Senior League | 3 | 0 | 0 | 0 | — | | 0 | 0 | 3 | 0 |
| APOEL | 2016–17 | Cypriot First Division | 0 | 0 | 0 | 0 | — | | 0 | 0 | 0 | 0 |
| Ethnikos Latsion (loan) | 2016–17 | Cypriot Third Division | 24 | 17 | 5 | 1 | — | | — | | 29 | 18 |
| Ayia Napa | 2017–18 | Cypriot Second Division | No data currently available | | | | | | | | | |
| Enosis Neon Paralimni | 2018–19 | Cypriot First Division | 3 | 1 | 0 | 0 | — | | — | | 3 | 1 |
| Ayia Napa | 2018–19 | Cypriot Second Division | No data currently available | | | | | | | | | |
| Hayes & Yeading United | 2019–20 | Southern League Premier Division South | 23 | 9 | 8 | 1 | — | | 4 (Note: One appearance and one goal in the Southern League Cup, three appearances in the FA Trophy) | 1 | 35 | 11 |
| Hayes & Yeading United | 2020–21 | Southern League Premier Division South | 3 | 2 | 3 | 4 | — | | 1 | 0 | 7 | 6 |
| Hayes & Yeading United | 2021–22 | Southern League Premier Division South | 33 | 7 | 6 | 1 | — | | 3 (Note: One appearance in the FA Trophy, two appearances and one goal in the Southern League Premier Division South play-offs) | 1 | 42 | 9 |
| Hayes & Yeading United | Total | | 59 | 18 | 17 | 6 | — | | 8 | 2 | 84 | 26 |
| Hemel Hempstead Town (loan) | 2020–21 | National League South | 6 | 2 | — | | — | | — | | 6 | 2 |
| Farnborough | 2022–23 | National League South | 12 | 0 | 5 | 0 | — | | 2 | 0 | 19 | 0 |
| Chesham United (loan) | 2022–23 | Southern League Premier Division South | 18 | 1 | — | | — | | 1 (Note: Appearance in the Southern League Premier Division South play-offs) | 0 | 19 | 1 |
| Hayes & Yeading United | 2023–24 | Southern League Premier Division South | 8 | 3 | 1 | 1 | — | | 0 | 0 | 9 | 4 |
| Career total | | | 151 | 49 | 28 | 8 | 2 | 0 | 15 | 2 | 196 | 61 |
