= Ricky Gabriel =

English footballer

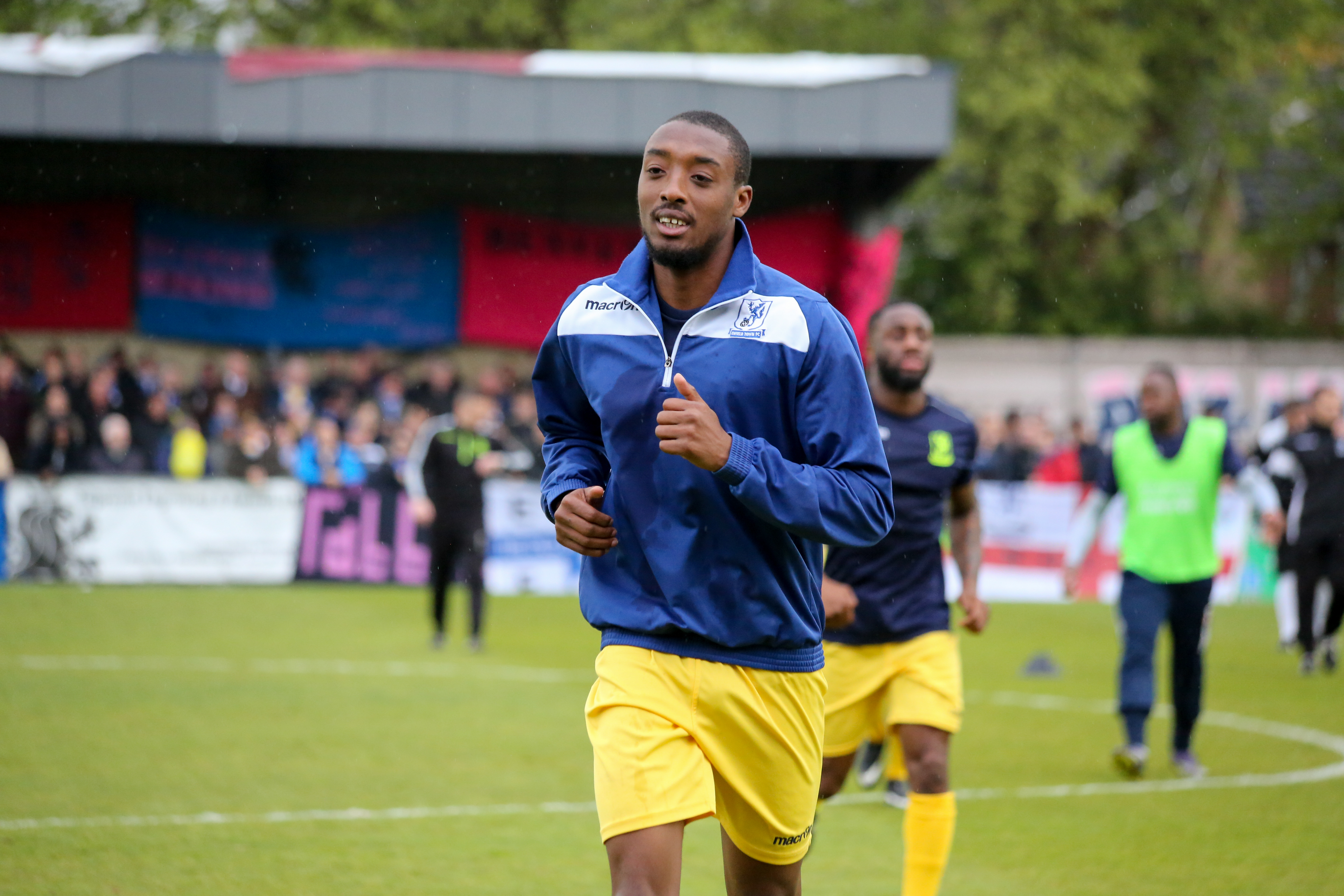
- Ricky Gabriel in 2017.

Personal information
- Full name: Ricky Clint Gabriel
- Date of birth: 24 June 1991 (age 35)
- Place of birth: London, England
- Position: Full-back

Senior career*
Years	Team	Apps	(Gls)
2012	Antigua Barracuda	4	(0)
2013–2014	Dover Athletic	0	(0)
2014–2015	Brimsdown	11	(3)
2015–2017	Enfield Town	70	(7)
2016	→ Brimsdown (loan)	2	(0)
2017–2019	Braintree Town	64	(0)
2019	Maidenhead United	5	(0)
- * Club domestic league appearances and goals as of 19:14, 27 April 2019 (UTC)

Ricky Clint Gabriel (born 24 June 1991) is an English footballer who plays as a full-back. In September 2019, Gabriel received a 14-year prison sentence for firearms offences.

== Career ==
Gabriel began his senior career in 2012 at Antigua Barracuda in the USL Pro when he started an away game at Pittsburgh Riverhounds on 28 July. He made four appearances before being released at the end of the season. Gabriel then joined Dover Athletic, but only made appearances in the Kent Senior Cup and joined Spartan South Midlands Football League side Brimsdown for 2014–15. After three goals in eleven games, Gabriel joined Enfield Town in January 2015. After two-and-a-half seasons, Gabriel joined Braintree Town in summer 2017, and was part of the team that won the National League South playoffs in his first season. Gabriel played 30 times for the Iron in the National League the following season before joining Maidenhead United in March 2019.

== Personal life ==
Gabriel is a triplet and his brothers Ralston and Reiss are also footballers. The brothers have played together at Brimsdown and Enfield Town.

On 6 September 2019, at Blackfriars Crown Court, Gabriel was found guilty of conspiracy to possess firearms and ammunition with intent to endanger life in July and jailed for 14 years, alongside his brothers Ralston and Reiss.

== Career statistics ==
As of 27 April 2019

Appearances and goals by club, season and competition
Club	Season	League			FA Cup		League Cup		Other		Total	
Club	Season	Division	Apps	Goals	Apps	Goals	Apps	Goals	Apps	Goals	Apps	Goals
Antigua Barracuda	2012	USL Pro	4	0	0	0	---		0	0	4	0
Dover Athletic	2013–14	Conference South	0	0	0	0	0	0	0	0	0	0
Brimsdown	2014–15	SSML Division Two	11	3	0	0	0	0	0	0	11	3
Enfield Town	2014–15	Isthmian Premier	17	1	0	0	---		0	0	17	1
Enfield Town	2015–16	Isthmian Premier	15	0	6	0	---		2 (Note: One appearance in the Alan Turvey Trophy, one appearance in the FA Trophy)	0	23	0
Enfield Town	2016–17	Isthmian Premier	38	6	0	0	---		2 (Note: One appearance in the Alan Turvey Trophy, one appearance in the Isthmian League playoffs)	0	40	6
Enfield Town	Total		70	7	6	0	---		4	0	80	7
Brimsdown (loan)	2015–16	SSML Division One	2	0	0	0	0	0	0	0	2	0
Braintree Town	2017–18	National League South	34	0	3	0	---		5 (Note: Two appearances in the FA Trophy, three appearances in the National League South playoffs)	0	42	0
Braintree Town	2018–19	National League	30	0	1	0	---		1 (Note: Appearances in the FA Trophy)	0	32	0
Braintree Town	Total		64	0	4	0	---		6	0	74	0
Maidenhead United	2018–19	National League	5	0	0	0	0	0	0	0	5	0
Career total			156	10	10	0	0	0	10	0	176	10
