= 2014–15 Spartan South Midlands Football League =

The 2014-15 Spartan South Midlands Football League season was the 18th in the history of Spartan South Midlands Football League, a football competition in England.

== Premier Division ==
Spartan South Midlands Football League Premier Division
- Season: 2014–15
- Champions: Kings Langley
- Promoted: Kings Langley
- Relegated: Ampthill Town; Hillingdon Borough
- Matches: 462
- Goals: 1,673 (3.62 per match)

The Premier Division featured 19 clubs which competed in the division last season, along with three new clubs:

- Kings Langley, promoted from Division One
- Sun Postal Sports, promoted from Division One and changed name to Sun Sports
- Wembley, transferred from Combined Counties Football League

=== League table ===
Pos	Team	Pld	W	D	L	GF	GA	GD	Pts	Promotion or relegation
1	Kings Langley	42	33	4	5	127	37	+90	103	Promoted to the Southern Football League
2	London Colney	42	29	6	7	78	26	+52	93	
3	AFC Dunstable	42	25	10	7	94	52	+42	85	
4	Harefield United	42	25	6	11	96	64	+32	81	
5	Sun Sports	42	25	3	14	84	60	+24	78	
6	Berkhamsted	42	24	4	14	105	64	+41	76	
7	Wembley	42	23	6	13	80	60	+20	75	
8	St Margaretsbury	42	21	10	11	88	51	+37	73	
9	Hadley	42	23	4	15	79	65	+14	73	
10	Tring Athletic	42	21	7	14	78	53	+25	70	
11	Hertford Town	42	19	8	15	86	71	+15	65	
12	Oxhey Jets	42	17	6	19	82	81	+1	57	
13	Biggleswade United	42	15	7	20	73	81	−8	52	
14	Colney Heath	42	12	10	20	69	75	−6	46	
15	Leverstock Green	42	13	6	23	63	94	−31	45	
16	Stotfold	42	11	11	20	65	94	−29	44	
17	London Tigers	42	9	10	23	62	96	−34	37	
18	Cockfosters	42	11	4	27	41	91	−50	37	
19	Hoddesdon Town	42	10	6	26	59	103	−44	36	
20	Holmer Green	42	10	4	28	56	114	−58	34	
21	Ampthill Town	42	8	7	27	44	120	−76	31	Relegated to Division One
22	Hillingdon Borough	42	4	9	29	64	121	−57	21	Relegated to Division One

Updated to match(es) played on 28 April 2015. Source: ssmfl.org
Rules for classification: 1) points; 2) goal difference; 3) number of goals scored.

=== Results ===
Home \ Away	AFD	AMP	BER	BIG	COC	COH	HAD	HAR	HER	HIL	HOD	HOL	KIL	LEV	LOC	LOT	OXJ	STM	STO	SPS	TRA	WEM
AFC Dunstable		2–1	1–0	2–0	4–0	3–0	2–0	0–4	2–0	4–4	2–1	5–1	3–0	2–2	0–1	0–2	0–0	1–6	5–0	5–3	1–1	1–1
Ampthill Town	0–6		3–1	0–3	3–1	1–1	2–5	1–1	3–2	2–1	3–0	2–3	0–5	1–3	0–2	1–1	2–1	1–2	1–2	0–3	0–2	1–1
Berkhamsted	0–2	6–0		2–3	3–1	2–2	0–3	3–1	5–3	3–0	1–2	4–0	1–1	3–0	0–1	3–1	2–1	1–4	6–1	1–0	2–2	3–1
Biggleswade United	2–4	4–0	2–1		2–0	1–1	2–1	0–7	1–2	3–0	3–1	1–1	0–2	0–1	0–2	4–1	3–2	4–4	3–4	0–2	1–2	2–3
Cockfosters	0–2	0–0	0–5	1–1		3–2	0–4	1–3	0–3	3–4	2–0	2–3	1–4	0–3	0–0	0–2	0–3	3–1	2–0	0–4	1–0	0–2
Colney Heath	1–1	8–0	3–4	2–1	0–1		0–3	0–2	0–2	4–0	1–2	0–2	1–2	3–0	0–2	2–3	1–0	1–3	1–1	0–2	1–0	1–2
Hadley	2–0	3–0	2–3	3–1	1–0	1–1		3–2	1–0	3–3	4–2	2–0	0–4	4–2	0–3	2–1	3–1	1–1	2–1	0–1	2–1	2–3
Harefield United	1–1	4–2	1–0	2–0	6–2	0–4	3–2		1–3	4–0	4–1	5–2	1–1	3–1	2–1	1–0	3–2	0–2	1–1	0–2	2–1	2–4
Hertford Town		7–1	2–3	1–4	2–1	3–3	3–1	1–2		1–1	2–2	4–0	3–1	2–1	0–3	2–1	5–2	0–4	1–3	1–2	2–2	2–1
Hillingdon Borough	2–3	2–4	1–3	2–2	2–0	1–4	2–3	2–5	0–4		4–2	3–0	1–3	1–3	0–5	3–3	1–2	0–2	2–3	1–6	1–2	2–3
Hoddesdon Town	1–2	2–1	3–2	1–2	2–3	6–1	1–3	2–2	1–6	2–1		1–3	1–3	2–0	2–0	2–2	1–3	1–1	1–1	2–1	0–4	0–2
Holmer Green	1–3	3–0	1–5	2–6	1–0	2–5	1–2	1–2	2–2	3–2	3–0		0–2	1–1	1–2	2–3	1–3	2–4	2–1	2–4	0–3	2–4
Kings Langley	0–2	5–1	4–1	4–1	2–0	1–1	1–0	5–0	1–0	4–2	3–2	6–0		2–0	3–0	6–1	4–1	5–0	4–1	0–3	1–3	2–0
Leverstock Green	1–4	2–2	1–3	2–1	3–3	5–3	6–2	0–2	0–2	4–3	5–1	1–1	1–6		1–2	2–0	1–2	0–5	5–2	0–1	0–4	0–2
London Colney	2–1	4–0	0–1	4–1	1–0	0–1	1–2	3–2	1–2	1–1	3–0	3–0	2–2	2–0		3–0	3–2	2–0	4–0	2–0	1–1	1–1
London Tigers	3–3	1–1	1–3	4–1	0–2	2–0	0–1	2–3	2–0	4–4	3–0	1–5	0–5	2–2	0–0		3–3	0–2	3–1	1–3	2–3	1–2
Oxhey Jets	2–2	5–0	0–4	1–1	0–2	5–1	2–1	4–1	2–0	4–2	1–3	3–0	0–5	1–0	0–3	4–0		4–3	3–4	1–2	2–3	1–0
St Margaretsbury	2–1	4–0	2–0	3–1	3–1	3–3	0–0	0–1	1–2	0–0	3–0	1–0	1–3	5–0	0–1	4–1	2–2		1–1	2–3	4–1	0–0
Stotfold	1–2	1–2	2–2	2–2	4–2	0–3	3–1	0–4	1–1	1–1	1–0	6–1	2–4	1–2	0–1	2–2	3–0	2–2		2–0	0–1	1–3
Sun Postal Sports	0–3	6–0	1–5	0–1	0–1	1–0	3–1	0–3	3–3	3–1	3–3	1–0	0–7	5–1	0–2	3–1	3–5	1–0	1–1		2–0	1–2
Tring Athletic	1–2	2–1	1–5	1–0	1–2	0–1	3–1	1–1	2–4	4–0	6–1	3–1	0–3	2–0	0–1	4–1	1–1	1–0	6–1	0–1		1–1
Wembley	2–4	3–1	4–3	1–3	5–0	2–2	0–2	3–2	3–0	2–1	3–1	6–0	0–1	0–1	0–3	2–1	2–1	0–1	4–1	0–4	0–2	

Updated to match(es) played on 28 April 2015. Source: football.mitoo.co
Legend: Blue = home team win; Yellow = draw; Red = away team win.

== Division One ==
Spartan South Midlands Football League Division One
- Season: 2014–15
- Champions: Welwyn Garden City
- Promoted: Welwyn Garden City; Broxbourne Borough; Bedford
- Relegated: Stony Stratford Town; Amersham Town
- Matches: 420
- Goals: 1,615 (3.85 per match)

Division One featured 21 clubs in the division for this season, of which there are four new clubs:

- Bush Hill Rangers, joined from the Herts County League
- Edgware Town, a newly formed club
- Hatfield Town, relegated from the Premier Division
- London Lions, relegated from the Premier Division

=== League table ===
Pos	Team	Pld	W	D	L	GF	GA	GD	Pts	Promotion or relegation
1	Welwyn Garden City	40	29	5	6	108	28	+80	92	Promoted to the Premier Division
2	Broxbourne Borough	40	26	7	7	100	55	+45	85	Promoted to the Premier Division
3	Bedford	40	26	6	8	102	37	+65	84	Promoted to the Premier Division
4	Hatfield Town	40	25	8	7	95	54	+41	83	
5	Risborough Rangers	40	21	9	10	78	51	+27	72	
6	Harpenden Town	40	20	10	10	84	50	+34	70	
7	Crawley Green	40	23	3	14	92	69	+23	69 (Note: Crawley Green was deducted 3 points for fielding an ineligible player on 30 August 2014 (at Chesham United Reserves).)	
8	Codicote	40	20	8	12	94	59	+35	68	
9	Edgware Town	40	18	9	13	89	86	+3	63	
10	Baldock Town	40	18	6	16	76	53	+23	60	
11	Bush Hill Rangers	40	16	8	16	69	63	+6	56	
12	Southall	40	13	14	13	78	78	0	53	
13	Langford	40	15	6	19	69	92	−23	51	
14	Winslow United	40	12	10	18	54	101	−47	46	
15	Buckingham Athletic	40	11	8	21	75	93	−18	41	
16	Wodson Park	40	10	9	21	61	95	−34	39	
17	London Lions	40	10	6	24	69	100	−31	36	Resigned to the Herts County League
18	Stony Stratford Town	40	10	6	24	64	101	−37	36	Relegated to Division Two
19	Chesham United Reserves	40	8	8	24	68	102	−34	32	
20	Arlesey Town Reserves	40	7	6	27	51	111	−60	27	
21	Amersham Town	40	3	6	31	39	137	−98	15	Relegated to Division Two

Updated to match(es) played on 1 May 2015. Source: m.ssmfl.org
Rules for classification: 1) points; 2) goal difference; 3) number of goals scored.

=== Results ===
Home \ Away	AME	ARL	BAL	BED	BRX	BUA	BHR	CHE	COD	CRG	EDG	HAR	HAT	LAN	LOL	RIS	SOU	STS	WGC	WIN	WOP
Amersham Town		4–1	2–6	0–3	0–8	1–6	1–2	0–3	0–5	2–4	1–9	1–3	1–2	1–4	0–3	0–0	3–3	1–1	0–5	2–1	1–1
Arlesey Town Reserves	1–1		1–2	1–4	0–0	3–2	1–4	1–4	1–1	2–3	3–0	0–6	1–1	1–3	3–2	1–0	1–2	2–1	0–2	0–1	2–5
Baldock Town	6–1	2–1		0–0	2–0	0–1	1–2	2–2	0–1	0–1	1–3	2–2	5–1	2–3	1–0	1–1	2–0	1–0	0–3	5–1	6–0
Bedford	3–1	4–0	1–1		0–1	8–1	3–1	3–1	0–1	4–3	1–3	1–0	2–0	3–2	3–1	4–1	1–1	4–0	0–1	2–3	0–0
Broxbourne Borough	5–1	5–4	4–1	3–2		3–2	2–0	5–1	1–0	2–1	1–6	5–2	2–0	2–2	3–2	4–1	1–1	4–2	2–1	4–1	4–0
Buckingham Athletic	3–1	6–2	1–4	0–2	2–3		1–0	5–2	0–4	2–3	4–3	0–0	0–3	0–1	8–2	1–1	1–1	4–1	0–3	2–3	0–3
Bush Hill Rangers	2–0	2–1	4–2	1–1	1–2	2–3		4–3	1–3	0–1	2–3	0–0	1–1	2–3	1–3	2–0	1–1	1–0	2–1	2–0	1–0
Chesham United Reserves	1–2	5–1	1–2	0–5	1–1	0–1	1–3		2–5	1–4	1–2	2–2	0–4	1–3	0–0	0–1	1–1	2–1	2–3	1–2	6–1
Codicote	5–0	3–0	1–0	1–2	1–0	2–2	2–2	2–0		1–2	1–1	1–2	0–2	3–2	2–3	4–5	4–2	4–2	0–0	1–1	2–0
Crawley Green	4–0	3–4	0–1	3–0	5–1	2–1	4–3	4–2	5–3		6–2	2–1	2–1	0–1	– (Note: Home win was awarded)	1–2	3–1	2–3	1–4	1–1	5–1
Edgware Town	0–0	0–3	3–1	0–3	0–2	3–2	0–7	2–3	1–0	2–1		2–1	5–2	5–4	1–1	0–6	3–1	3–3	0–2	7–1	1–1
Harpenden Town	2–1	4–0	1–0	0–0	4–2	3–1	3–1	3–3	1–0	2–2	2–2		1–3	4–0	1–0	2–1	1–1	2–1	1–2	2–3	4–0
Hatfield Town	5–1	7–2	1–0	1–2	0–0	4–0	1–0	2–2	2–2	3–1	2–0	2–0		5–0	2–1	2–1	0–0	5–2	2–1	4–0	3–3
Langford	3–2	2–2	0–5	0–7	0–2	3–1	1–2	1–2	2–6	3–1	3–0	1–6	2–3		2–2	0–3	2–0	1–2	2–4	0–1	1–1
London Lions	2–1	3–0	1–3	0–5	0–1	5–4	3–3	4–3	6–4	0–4	2–3	2–3	2–3	1–3		2–2	0–1	2–2	0–3	1–2	0–6
Risborough Rangers	4–0	2–0	1–0	0–2	2–1	1–0	1–2	3–2	1–1	6–1	2–2	0–4	2–2	2–1	3–0		2–1	4–3	0–0	3–0	2–1
Southall	4–2	2–2	2–2	0–4	3–6	2–2	4–2	6–1	5–2	0–1	2–2	0–3	2–3	4–2	6–3	1–5		4–2	3–2	1–1	1–2
Stony Stratford Town	3–2	4–0	1–4	1–7	1–1	2–2	1–1	2–0	1–5	0–4	4–0	2–1	2–3	2–3	0–3	1–0	0–3		0–5	1–2	3–1
Welwyn Garden City	6–0	4–1	1–0	3–1	1–0	4–1	3–1	5–0	0–2	4–0	1–1	1–0	3–2	1–1	4–1	0–0	1–2	4–0		5–0	2–0
Winslow United	4–1	3–1	1–3	1–3	1–3	1–1	2–1	2–2	2–6	1–0	1–6	2–2	1–2	1–1	0–3	0–3	1–1	1–5	0–8		4–4
Wodson Park	4–1	2–1	3–0	0–2	0–4	2–2	0–0	2–4	0–3	2–1	2–3	1–3	2–4	0–1	4–3	2–4	1–3	3–2	0–5	1–1	

Updated to match(es) played on 1 May 2015. Source: football.mitoo.co
Legend: Blue = home team win; Yellow = draw; Red = away team win.

== Division Two ==
Spartan South Midlands Football League Division Two
- Season: 2014–15
- Champions: Hale Leys United
- Promoted: Brimsdown; New Bradwell St Peter
- Matches: 210
- Goals: 889 (4.23 per match)

Division Two featured 14 clubs which competed in the division last season, along with two new clubs:

- Clean Slate, joined from the North Bucks & District League
- Ealing Town, new club

=== League table ===
Pos	Team	Pld	W	D	L	GF	GA	GD	Pts	Promotion
1	Hale Leys United	28	22	4	2	109	29	+80	70	
2	Kent Athletic	28	20	7	1	80	27	+53	67	
3	New Bradwell St Peter	28	17	6	5	74	35	+39	57	Promoted to the Division One
4	Brimsdown	28	17	5	6	92	39	+53	56	Promoted to the Division One
5	Old Bradwell United	28	16	4	8	79	41	+38	52	
6	Pitstone & Ivinghoe United	28	15	6	7	67	45	+22	51	
7	Totternhoe	28	15	5	8	71	43	+28	50	
8	The 61	28	12	3	13	50	41	+9	39	
9	Mursley United	28	11	6	11	46	48	−2	39	
10	Grendon Rangers	28	7	4	17	45	103	−58	25	
11	Tring Corinthians	28	6	5	17	29	69	−40	23	
12	Wolverton Town	28	6	5	17	39	89	−50	23	
13	Aston Clinton	28	4	5	19	34	70	−36	17	
14	Willen	28	3	4	21	36	102	−66	13	Resigned from the league
15	Clean Slate	28	3	3	22	38	108	−70	12	
16	Ealing Town	0	0	0	0	0	0	0	0	Club folded, record expunged

Source: fchd
Rules for classification: 1) points; 2) goal difference; 3) number of goals scored.
