= Woodford Town F.C. (disambiguation) =

Woodford Town F.C. may refer to three different football clubs based in Woodford, Greater London, England

- Woodford Town F.C., the current club using the name
- Woodford Town F.C. (1937), which folded in 2003
- Woodford Town F.C. (2007), which folded in 2015
