= Jay Rodriguez =

English footballer (born 1989)

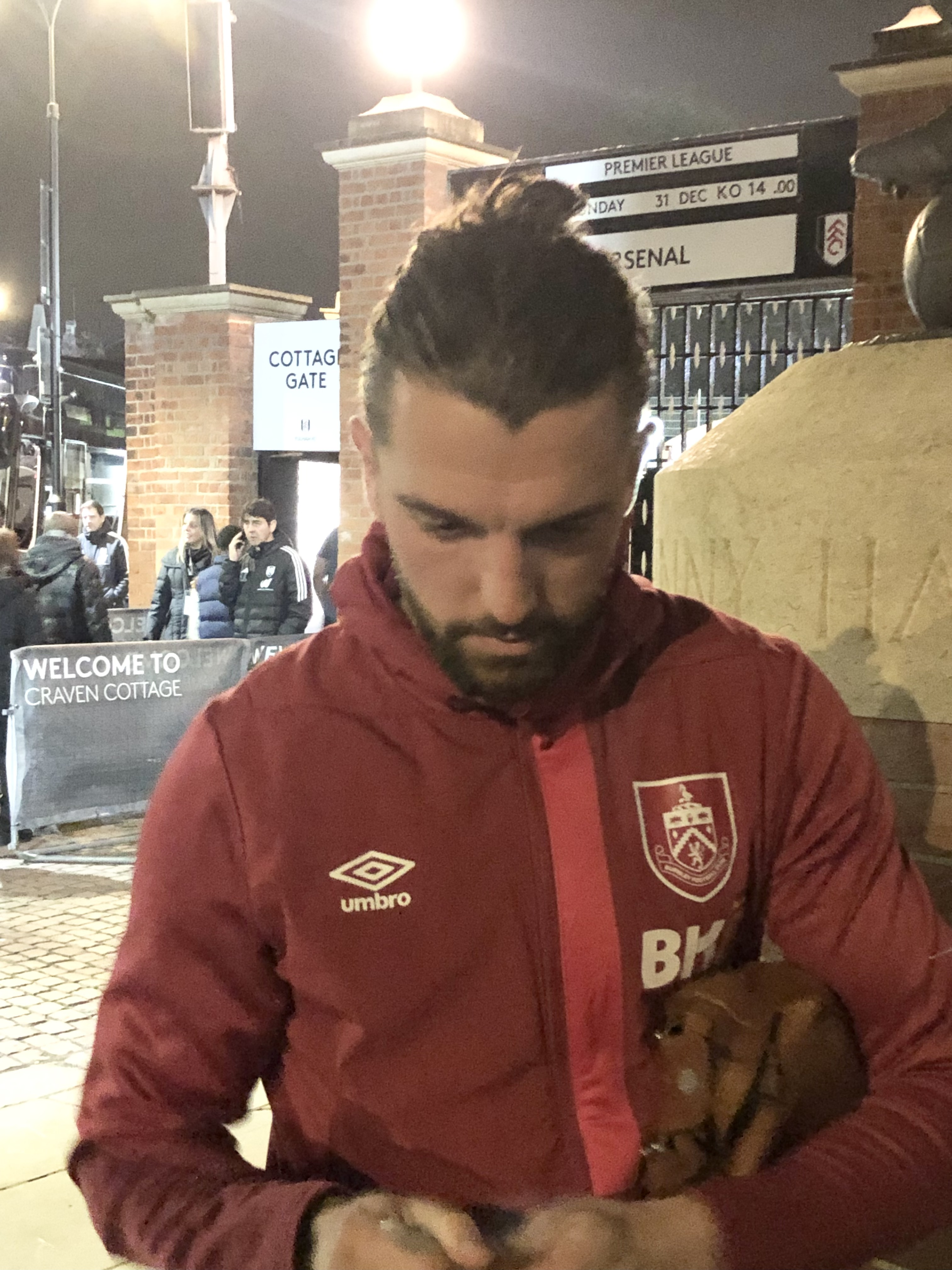
- Rodriguez with Burnley in 2023

Personal information
- Full name: Jay Enrique Rodriguez
- Date of birth: 29 July 1989 (age 37)
- Place of birth: Burnley, England
- Height: 6 ft 1 in (1.85 m)
- Position: Forward

Youth career
- –2007: Burnley

Senior career*
Years	Team	Apps	(Gls)
2007–2012	Burnley	105	(31)
2008	→ Stirling Albion (loan)	11	(3)
2010	→ Barnsley (loan)	6	(1)
2012–2017	Southampton	104	(26)
2017–2019	West Bromwich Albion	82	(29)
2019–2025	Burnley	165	(25)
2025–2026	Wrexham	24	(2)
Total		497	(117)

International career
2011	England U21	1	(0)
2013	England	1	(0)
- * Club domestic league appearances and goals

Jay Enrique Rodriguez (born 29 July 1989) is an English former professional footballer who played as a forward.

Rodriguez began his career with his hometown club Burnley, for whom he scored 41 goals in 128 appearances across all competitions from his debut in 2007. In 2012, he joined Southampton for around £7 million, where his form earned him his only England cap, but shortly thereafter he missed over a year with injury. In 2017, Rodriguez joined West Bromwich Albion for a fee of £12 million. Two years later, he returned to Burnley, where he played four further Premier League seasons, and also won the Championship in 2022–23. In 2025, he joined Wrexham.

== Early life ==
Jay Enrique Rodriguez was born on 29 July 1989 in Burnley, Lancashire. He is of Spanish descent through his father and paternal grandparents. His father Kiko was also born in Burnley, to Spanish parents, and grew up in Spain and England. Kiko was a non-League footballer.

Rodriguez is the older of two sons. He attended Heasandford Primary School and Barden High School in the town.

== Club career ==
=== Burnley ===
Rodriguez signed a contract with Burnley and was promoted to the senior squad at the end of the 2006–07 season after progressing through the youth ranks at the club and completing his two-year apprenticeship. He was the only player to be signed by Burnley manager Steve Cotterill from the seven youth players available at the time.

He made his first team debut for Burnley in the Championship on 29 December 2007, when he came on as a late substitute for Stephen Jordan in the 1–0 defeat to Bristol City at Turf Moor. Rodriguez finished the 2007–08 season on loan at Scottish First Division club Stirling Albion after signing in January 2008. He continued to train with the Clarets whilst reporting for Stirling on match days. He made his debut for Albion a day later in the 3–0 defeat against Celtic in the fourth round tie of the Scottish Cup at Celtic Park. He came on as a second-half substitute for David McKenna. He made his first start a week after against Livingston, but after the match he then faced a six-week absence through fatigue and lack of fitness. His first match back on 1 March saw him come off the bench to score a consolation in the last minute and his first professional goal away to Morton which ended in a 2–1 defeat. He stayed with Stirling until the end of the campaign and also scored goals against Livingston and St Johnstone, but these goals weren't enough to keep Albion up and they were relegated after finishing bottom of the table.

Rodriguez was given his first appearance of the 2008–09 season on 23 September 2008, when he scored his first goal for Burnley in the League Cup third round against Fulham, coming on as a late substitute securing a win in the 88th minute. He started featuring regularly in the first team as a substitute and followed this up with goals against Queens Park Rangers in the FA Cup, and scored a dramatic goal against Tottenham Hostpur in the League Cup semi-final, equalising the tie on aggregate making it 4–4 late on, and although Burnley went on to win the match 3–2 on the night, the tie finished 6–4 to Spurs on aggregate after late goals in extra time from Jermain Defoe and Roman Pavlyuchenko. His first league goal for Burnley came on 11 March 2009 in a 4–2 victory over Crystal Palace at Turf Moor. He then scored a stunning goal three days later in an emphatic 5–0 home victory over Nottingham Forest, which later on won him the accolade of Burnley goal of the season. His first start for the Clarets came a month later on 11 April 2009 in the Championship match against Queens Park Rangers in a 1–0 win. Rodriguez was also played a part in Burnley's play off campaign which saw them promoted to the Premier League after victories over Reading, and a 1–0 Championship play-off final win over Sheffield United at Wembley Stadium. He featured in this match as a substitute replacing Steven Thompson.

Following the club's promotion to the Premier League in 2009, Rodriguez injured an ankle while playing for the reserves and found it difficult to break into the first team. On 1 February 2010, he completed a one-month loan move to Barnsley. He scored on his debut for Barnsley against Preston North End.

Rodriguez enjoyed a successful 2010–11 season by becoming Burnley's top goal scorer with 14 league goals, and 15 in all competitions. At the end of the season, he won Burnley's Player of the Year and Players' Player of the Year awards.

On 9 August 2011, Rodriguez scored four goals in the League Cup first round against Burton Albion. His first two were from the penalty spot in normal time, with the other two from open play in extra time to make the score 6–3. His first and second league goals of the season came in a 5–1 win against Nottingham Forest, opening the scoring and adding a second goal 10 minutes later. On 26 November 2011, he scored a 93rd-minute winner in a 3–2 win away to Hull City. He scored again three days later in the following match in a 4–0 win at home to Ipswich Town. His first goal of 2012 came on 7 January in an FA Cup third round match away to Norwich City. He scored his first league goal of 2012 the following match in a 2–0 win away to Middlesbrough. On 31 January, he scored two goals as Burnley beat Nottingham Forest 2–0. He scored again the following match in a 1–1 draw at home to Peterborough United, this time rescuing a point for Burnley as he scored a terrific solo goal, dribbling the ball from near the centre circle before scoring. This was his 17th goal of the season in all competitions. Rodriguez finished the season as Burnley's top goalscorer with 21 in all competitions which helped him earn a place in the Championship PFA Team of the Year.

=== Southampton ===
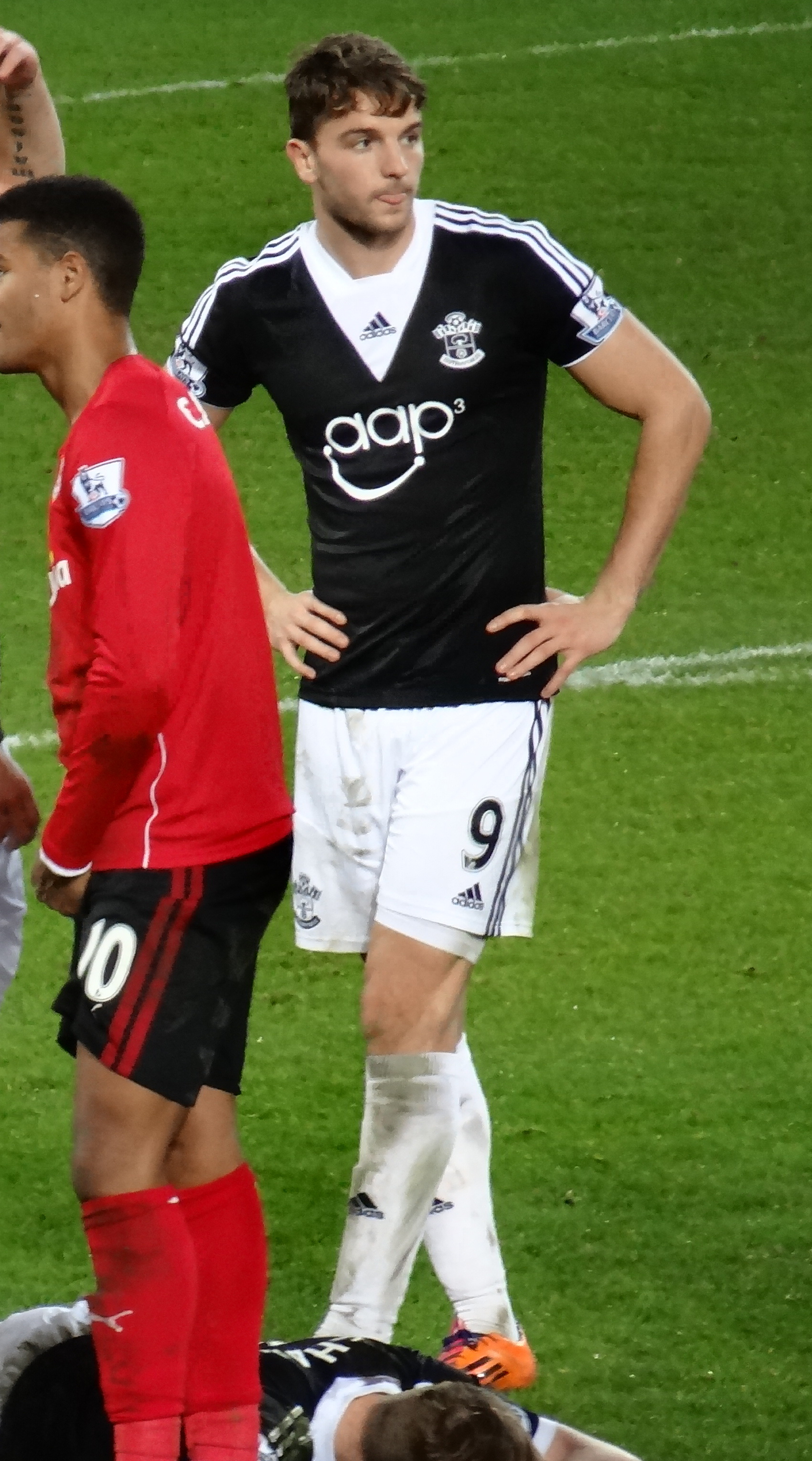
Rodriguez playing for Southampton in 2013

In the summer of 2012, Rodriguez was subject to a lot of interest from Premier League clubs, and on 23 May, Championship rivals Cardiff City were reported to have made an offer for Rodriguez. On 28 May, it was reported that Burnley had accepted a "substantial offer" from newly promoted Premier League side Southampton. On 10 June, Rodriguez signed for Southampton on a four-year deal reported to be in the region of £7 million.

Rodriguez made his Premier League debut on the opening day of the 2012–13 season, starting against Manchester City, before being substituted by Rickie Lambert in the 55th minute. He scored his first competitive goals for Southampton on 25 September, scoring twice in a 2–0 win against Sheffield Wednesday in the League Cup. Rodriguez scored his first Premier League goal for Southampton against Tottenham Hotspur on 28 October 2012. He scored his first FA Cup goal for Southampton on 5 January 2013 in a defeat to Chelsea in the third round. On 30 January, he opened the scoring in a 2–1 defeat to Manchester United at Old Trafford, before two goals from Wayne Rooney turned the match around. On 16 March, he scored the final goal in 3–1 home win against Liverpool. He continued his fine run of form with goals in a 2–1 home win over reigning European champions Chelsea and in a 2–0 away victory against Reading.

Rodriguez scored his first goal of the 2013–14 season in a 5–1 League Cup win over Barnsley on 27 August 2013. His first Premier League goal came in a 2–0 win at home to Swansea City on 6 October. On 2 December, he scored the fastest Premier League goal of the season with a strike in the 15th second of a 3–1 loss away to Chelsea. On 4 January 2014, Rodriguez scored for Southampton in a 4–3 FA Cup third round win over his former team Burnley.

During March 2014, Rodriguez scored five goals in four matches to reach 15 Premier League goals for the season. On 5 April, he was stretchered off during a match against Manchester City after injuring his knee. Three days later, it was revealed that Rodriguez had ruptured an anterior cruciate ligament and would be out for eleven months, ruling him out of the 2014 FIFA World Cup in the process. He did not play a single match during the 2014–15 season as a result of this injury.

On 12 May 2015, it was announced that Rodriguez signed a new four-year deal with Southampton. He made his first competitive appearance for 16 months on 6 August, when he replaced Graziano Pellè for the final 18 minutes of a 2–0 away victory (5–0 aggregate) against Vitesse Arnhem in the UEFA Europa League third qualifying round. Two weeks later he scored the first goal since his return, equalising with a penalty in a 1–1 home draw with FC Midtjylland in the first leg of the play-off. He registered his first Premier League goal in nearly two years on 27 August 2016 against Sunderland, at St. Mary's, coming on late to equalise and rescue a point for Southampton in a 1–1 draw. He came on as a 90th-minute substitute in Southampton's 3–2 defeat to Manchester United in the 2017 EFL Cup Final at Wembley Stadium on 26 February.

=== West Bromwich Albion ===
On 2 July 2017, Rodriguez signed for fellow Premier League club West Bromwich Albion on a four-year contract for a £12 million fee. He made his debut for the club in the opening game of the 2017–18 season, a 1–0 win over AFC Bournemouth, on 12 August 2017. His first West Brom goal came ten days later in the second round of the EFL Cup, in a 3–1 win over League Two side Accrington Stanley.

During the 2–0 victory over Brighton & Hove Albion on 13 January 2018, Brighton defender Gaëtan Bong accused Rodriguez of racial abuse. The charges were later found not proven by the Football Association due to lack of evidence, following which West Bromwich issued a club statement in support of Rodriguez. In December 2018, Rodriguez scored a stoppage-time equaliser against local rivals Aston Villa when the officials failed to notice that he "had clearly bundled the ball into the net with his hands". He admitted doing so, but said it had not been deliberate.

=== Return to Burnley ===
On 9 July 2019, Rodriguez was re-signed by Burnley on a two-year contract, for an initial fee of £5 million, with another £5 million to be paid after 12 months. His contract was extended on 25 November 2020 to last until June 2022, along with Matěj Vydra.

On 21 September 2021, Rodriguez scored all four goals in Burnley's 4–1 victory over Rochdale in the EFL Cup. In May 2022, his contract was extended for two more years. On 30 May 2024, after the club's relegation, he signed a new one-year contract.

=== Wrexham ===
On 31 January 2025, Rodriguez signed for EFL League One club Wrexham on an 18-month deal. He and Danny Ward were not named in the squad for the 2025–26 EFL Championship, which had to include at most 25 players aged over 21. On 15 May 2026 the club announced it was releasing the player.

On 4 November 2026, Rodriguez announced his retirement from professional football.

== International career ==
In February 2011, Rodriguez received his first call up for the England under-21 squad. On 8 February 2011, he made his international debut in a friendly against Italy under-21, coming on as a substitute in the 60th minute replacing James Vaughan.

Rodriguez earned his first call-up to the full England squad on 7 November 2013, along with Southampton teammates Rickie Lambert and Adam Lallana, for England's friendlies against Chile and Germany. He won his only cap for England on 15 November in a friendly match against Chile at Wembley Stadium.

He suffered a ruptured ACL in April 2014 while playing for Southampton which ended his hopes of making the England squad for the 2014 World Cup in Brazil.

== Career statistics ==
=== Club ===
Appearances and goals by club, season and competition
Club	Season	League			National cup (Note: Includes FA Cup, Scottish Cup)		League cup (Note: Includes League Cup)		Other		Total	
Club	Season	Division	Apps	Goals	Apps	Goals	Apps	Goals	Apps	Goals	Apps	Goals
Burnley	2007–08	Championship	1	0	0	0	0	0	—		1	0
Burnley	2008–09	Championship	25	2	4	1	3	2	3 (Note: Appearances in Championship play-offs)	0	35	5
Burnley	2009–10	Premier League	0	0	0	0	2	0	—		2	0
Burnley	2010–11	Championship	42	14	3	1	3	0	—		48	15
Burnley	2011–12	Championship	37	15	1	1	4	5	—		42	21
Burnley	Total		105	31	8	3	12	7	3	0	128	41
Stirling Albion (loan)	2007–08	Scottish First Division	11	3	1	0	—		—		12	3
Barnsley (loan)	2009–10	Championship	6	1	—		—		—		6	1
Southampton	2012–13	Premier League	35	6	1	1	1	2	—		37	9
Southampton	2013–14	Premier League	33	15	3	1	3	1	—		39	17
Southampton	2014–15	Premier League	0	0	0	0	0	0	—		0	0
Southampton	2015–16	Premier League	12	0	0	0	1	2	3 (Note: Appearances in UEFA Europa League)	1	16	3
Southampton	2016–17	Premier League	24	5	2	0	4	0	4	1	34	6
Southampton	Total		104	26	6	2	9	5	7	2	126	35
West Bromwich Albion	2017–18	Premier League	37	7	3	3	2	1	—		42	11
West Bromwich Albion	2018–19	Championship	45	22	1	0	0	0	2	0	48	22
West Bromwich Albion	Total		82	29	4	3	2	1	2	0	90	33
Burnley	2019–20	Premier League	36	8	2	2	1	1	—		39	11
Burnley	2020–21	Premier League	31	1	2	2	2	0	—		35	3
Burnley	2021–22	Premier League	29	2	1	1	3	4	—		33	7
Burnley	2022–23	Championship	28	10	1	0	0	0	—		29	10
Burnley	2023–24	Premier League	21	2	0	0	3	0	—		24	2
Burnley	2024–25	Championship	20	2	1	0	1	0	—		22	2
Burnley	Total		165	25	7	5	10	5	—		182	35
Wrexham	2024–25	EFL League One	17	2	—		—		—		17	2
Wrexham	2025–26	Championship	7	0	1 (Note: Soccerbase does not list his appearance in the 9 January 2026 FA Cup victory over Nottingham Forest)	0	0	0	—		8	0
Wrexham	Total		24	2	1	0	0	0	—		25	2
Career total			497	117	27	13	33	18	12	2	579	150

=== International ===
Appearances and goals by national team and year
National team	Year	Apps	Goals
England	2013	1	0
Total		1	0

== Honours ==
Burnley

- EFL Championship: 2022–23
- Football League Championship play-offs: 2009

Southampton

- EFL Cup runner-up: 2016–17

Wrexham

- EFL League One second-place promotion: 2024–25

Individual

- PFA Fans' Player of The Year: 2011–12 Championship
- PFA Team of the Year: 2011–12 Championship
- Burnley Player of the Year: 2010–11
- Burnley Players' Player of the Year: 2010–11
