= 2013–14 Southampton F.C. season =

Southampton F.C.
2013–14 season
- Chairman: Nicola Cortese (until 15 January 2014); Katharina Liebherr (15 January–12 March 2014); Ralph Krueger (from 12 March 2014)
- Manager: Mauricio Pochettino
- Stadium: St Mary's Stadium
- Premier League: 8th
- FA Cup: Fifth round
- League Cup: Fourth round
- Top goalscorer: League: Jay Rodriguez (15); All: Jay Rodriguez (17)
- Highest home attendance: 31,659 v Liverpool (1 March 2014)
- Lowest home attendance: 27,987 v Stoke City (8 February 2014)
- Average home league attendance: 30,211
Home colours	Away colours	Third colours

The 2013–14 Southampton F.C. season was the club's 15th season in the Premier League, and their 37th in the top division of English football. Having secured their place in the Premier League the previous season following a seven-year absence from the top flight, the club progressed in their league performance and achieved their main aim of a top-ten finish. Southampton finished eighth in the Premier League table, having won 15, drawn 11, and lost 12 of their 38 games played: their best season since 2002–03. They also made it to the fifth round of the FA Cup and the fourth round of the League Cup.

After releasing eight players at the beginning of the season, Southampton signed Croatian centre back Dejan Lovren from French side Lyon for a fee reported to be in the region of £8.5 million. The club later broke their record transfer fee twice, first signing Kenyan midfielder Victor Wanyama from Scottish club Celtic for £12.5 million and later enlisting Italian striker Dani Osvaldo for £15 million. Defender Vegard Forren and midfielder Richard Chaplow left the club in July, winger Jason Puncheon joined Crystal Palace on loan for the season, former team captain Dean Hammond was sold to Leicester City, and striker Emmanuel Mayuka joined French side Sochaux-Montbéliard on loan for the season. In the January transfer window, Tadanari Lee and Aaron Martin were released from the club; Billy Sharp, Lee Barnard and Danny Fox left on loan deals; and Jason Puncheon's loan deal with Crystal Palace was made permanent. Club record signing Dani Osvaldo also left the club in a loan move to Juventus on 31 January, following his involvement in a training ground fight with defender José Fonte earlier in the month.

Displaying evidence of a much stronger defence than the previous season, Southampton started 2013–14 well by winning six of their first 11 games, conceding only five goals, and remaining unbeaten for almost two months between September and November, reaching a peak of third in the Premier League table in the process. This run of form led to manager Mauricio Pochettino being named the Premier League Manager of the Month for October, ahead of José Mourinho, Arsène Wenger, and Brendan Rodgers. Four losses in their next six matches followed, however, and the Saints had fallen to ninth position by Christmas; in their six matches before Christmas, they conceded a total of 13 goals, more than double the five conceded in their opening 11. The team returned on Boxing Day to pick up their first win since early November, and a period of mixed fortunes saw the team remain just above the middle of the league table.

After repeated speculation surrounding his future with the club, it was announced on 15 January 2014 that Southampton chairman Nicola Cortese, who helped bring the club out of administration in 2009 with then owner Markus Liebherr, had resigned from the post. This was reportedly due to tensions with Liebherr's daughter Katharina, who took over ownership of the club when her father died in 2010. Rumours that it was Katherina Liebherr's intention to sell the club circulated but were subsequently proven to be unfounded. The future of manager Mauricio Pochettino was called into question by Cortese's departure, after he had previously stated that he would leave if Cortese left, but he committed his future to the club until at least the end of the season, with a more long-term decision to be made upon the season's conclusion. A number of sources also claimed that Southampton's players were at risk of leaving, with Luke Shaw, Adam Lallana, and Rickie Lambert all being linked with moves away from the club, although Liebherr announced quickly that "The club [had] no plans to sell any of the squad" during January. After much speculation, Ralph Krueger was appointed chairman officially on 12 March 2014.

== Pre-season ==
Southampton began their pre-season preparations on 17 July 2013, a month before the Premier League season is due to begin, with a match against Spanish side Llagostera at the home stadium of Palafrugell. The Saints started the game well, and after having an early goal disallowed for offside it was Jay Rodriguez who opened the scoring in the 28th minute after taking advantage of defensive errors in the penalty area. Steven Davis came close to adding a second before the break, but it was the Spanish side who struck next when defender David Cano headed in an equaliser in the second half. With ten substitutions on, remaining player and first-half goalscorer Rodriguez scored a second just a few minutes later to put Southampton back in the lead, before departing for James Ward-Prowse. Despite a few late chances, the match remained 2–1 to see the Premier League side win their first pre-season fixture. Southampton then faced Palamós three days later, overcoming the side with a convincing 8–0 win. Adam Lallana, Jason Puncheon, and Morgan Schneiderlin put the Saints three up in the first half, and Jay Rodriguez scored from the spot on 60 minutes, before half-time substitute Guly do Prado scored a nine-minute hat-trick to take his side's goal tally to seven. Luke Shaw finished the scoring off five minutes before full-time, marking a successful end to Southampton's time at their Catalan training camp.

Southampton later travelled to another training camp in the Wörthersee region of Austria, where they faced German side Schalke 04 at the Stadion Villach Lind on 24 July. The Saints started the game positively, with Rickie Lambert and Jay Rodriguez forming a strong partnership up front, but Schalke goalkeeper Timo Hildebrand was on form to deny efforts from Lloyd Isgrove and Jason Puncheon. With the introduction of striker Klaas-Jan Huntelaar though, Schalke came out into the second half the stronger side, with the Dutch 2010 FIFA World Cup runner-up enjoying the majority of his team's chances before breaking the deadlock just before the hour mark. Despite making six changes in response to the opening goal, Southampton were unable to get back into the game as Joël Matip scored past substitute goalkeeper Paulo Gazzaniga less than ten minutes after Huntelaar's first, and saw the game out without conceding to see the Saints pick up their first pre-season loss of the campaign. The side then played Turkish club Beşiktaş on 27 July, responding to their loss against Schalke by winning 3–1. The majority of the action took place in the second half, with the Turkish UEFA Champions League participants taking the lead in the 62nd minute through young midfielder Muhammed Demirci's long-range shot. Southampton left it late to equalise, with Rickie Lambert picking up his first pre-season goal after 75 minutes to equalise for the Saints, before substitute Emmanuel Mayuka scored his first goal for the club shortly after having a strike disallowed for offside. Southampton continued to dominate in the late stages of the game, and second substitute Lloyd Isgrove also scoring his first for the club on 90 minutes to see Southampton win their third of four pre-season fixtures.

The Premier League side returned to Spain to face Celta Vigo on 3 August at the Estadio Municipal de Balaídos for the club's pre-season tournament the Trofeo Memorial Quinocho. In the first half, Southampton came close to opening the scoring through Jay Rodriguez, Rickie Lambert, and Gastón Ramírez, with Dejan Lovren also having a number of chances. Guly enjoyed the majority of his side's chances after break, but the game ended goalless after the full 90 minutes which meant that a penalty shootout was needed to decide the winner; Vigo converted all four of their penalties, while Guly failed to score and James Ward-Prowse's effort was saved by the home goalkeeper, meaning the Saints lost their second game pre-season match of the year.

The team's final friendly fixture took place against Real Sociedad at St Mary's Stadium on 10 August, a week before the league kicked off. Southampton started the game positively, with recently announced England international Rickie Lambert taking a long shot early on before providing Adam Lallana with the ball to score a volley in the seventh minute and put the team one up at home. The Saints continued to press, with attacking play through Morgan Schneiderlin, Jay Rodriguez, and Jos Hooiveld (who had a header cleared off the line), but it was a defensive error on the part of the Premier League side that allowed Sociedad midfielder Gorka Elustondo to tap in for 1–1. The hosts responded quickly though, as Schneiderlin got onto the end of a pass by new signing Victor Wanyama to regain his side's lead just four minutes later; Carlos Vela scored a second equaliser for the Spanish side though when he beat young defender Calum Chambers in the box, before Hooiveld helped Southampton regain their lead again with a powerful header on 40 minutes. Just before the end of the first half, Luke Shaw picked up an injury which saw him forced off the pitch and replaced by Danny Fox. With four substitutions made by Southampton at half time, the game remained a competitive affair, although it was the visitors who struck first after the break when second goalscorer Vela combined with striker Haris Seferovic to bring the game level for the third time. With more changes made in the friendly and more chances for both sides in the remaining half an hour, it looked as if the game would end level, before substitute winger Jason Puncheon scored in the 83rd minute to secure the win for Southampton in their last pre-season preparation game.

17 July 2013 Friendly	Llagostera	1–2	Southampton	Palafrugell, Spain
18:00 BST	Cano 61'	Report	Rodriguez 28', 67'	Stadium: Estadi Josep Pla i Arbonès

20 July 2013 Friendly	Palamós	0–8	Southampton	Palamós, Spain
18:00 BST		Report	Lallana 11'; Puncheon 14'; Schneiderlin 36'; Rodriguez 60' (pen.); Do Prado 63', 65', 72'; Shaw 85'	Stadium: Nou Estadi Municipal de Palamós

24 July 2013 Friendly	Southampton	0–2	Schalke 04	Villach, Austria
17:00 BST		Report	Huntelaar 58'; Matip 69'	Stadium: Stadion Villach Lind

27 July 2013 Friendly	Southampton	3–1	Beşiktaş	Villach, Austria
17:30 BST	Lambert 75'; Mayuka 78'; Isgrove 90'	Report	Demirci 62'	Stadium: Stadion Villach Lind

3 August 2013 Trofeo Memorial; Quinocho	Celta Vigo	0–0 (4–1 p)	Southampton	Vigo, Spain
19:00 BST		Report		Stadium: Estadio Municipal de Balaídos
	Penalties
	Rodríguez (penalty scored); Orellana (penalty scored); López (penalty scored); Goldar (penalty scored)		(penalty missed) Do Prado; (penalty missed) Ward-Prowse; (penalty scored) Davis
Note: Celta Vigo win the Trofeo Memorial Quinocho

10 August 2013 Friendly	Southampton	4–3	Real Sociedad	Southampton
15:00 BST	Lallana 7'; Schneiderlin 33'; Hooiveld 40'; Puncheon 83'	Report	Elustondo 29'; Vela 38'; Seferovic 59'	Stadium: St Mary's Stadium; Attendance: 8,434; Referee: Darren Sheldrake

== Premier League ==
=== August–October 2013 ===
West Bromwich Albion (17 August 2013)

Southampton began their second season back in the Premier League at The Hawthorns against West Bromwich Albion, who in the previous season were one of only three teams to beat the newly promoted Saints in both fixtures. The visitors began the game the stronger side, enjoying the majority possession and potential chances, with set pieces from young midfielder James Ward-Prowse threatening Ben Foster's goal numerous times. With relatively few early chances on goal though, it was the Saints who broke the deadlock first when Adam Lallana tapped in a saved Rickie Lambert header from a Calum Chambers cross, although the goal was controversially disallowed for offside.

In the second half, Southampton continued to pressurise the hosts as Jay Rodriguez came close a number of times, once striking the crossbar with a shot; Albion responded with some attacking presses, but defenders Dejan Lovren and Chambers were strong to deny the efforts from reaching goal. In the final minute of normal play, Youssouf Mulumbu brought down Luke Shaw in the penalty area, and last season's top scorer Lambert stepped up to convert the penalty and secure the win for Saints on the opening day of the season. In the four minutes of added time, Albion had possibly their best chance of the game through Billy Jones, but a reflex Artur Boruc save meant Southampton kept the points and began their season in fifth place in the table.

Sunderland (24 August 2013)

Southampton's first home game of the season took place against Sunderland on 24 August, who in the previous season had finished just three positions and two points lower than the Saints. Despite naming an unchanged team from the one that beat West Brom the preceding week, the home side went behind after just two minutes when Emanuele Giaccherini exploited some poor marking to head home Sebastian Larsson's corner and put the Black Cats one up. After conceding, Southampton dominated much of the rest of the first half, with Jay Rodriguez having a goal disallowed for offside and Rickie Lambert coming close on a number of occasions, while they also had more than one penalty call turned down by the officials.

In the second half the Saints replaced Luke Shaw and Morgan Schneiderlin with Nathaniel Clyne and new signing Dani Osvaldo respectively, while Sunderland replaced Stéphane Sessègnon with Ji Dong-won, who nearly added Sunderland's second shortly after the break. Both teams had chances to score in a more even second half, with Jay Rodriguez and Adam Johnson coming close for either side, but it wasn't until the 88th minute that Southampton finally got an equaliser when James Ward-Prowse swung a free kick into the Sunderland penalty area for José Fonte to head in from close range. Osvaldo's debut was marked by a yellow card, as well as another late challenge which almost saw him sent off, and the Saints finished the weekend sixth in the table as one of only seven teams to be unbeaten in their first two games.

Norwich City (31 August 2013)

The following week Southampton travelled to Carrow Road to face Norwich City, giving new striker Dani Osvaldo his first start for the club in place of Jay Rodriguez. Norwich arguably started the game the stronger of the two sides, and young winger Nathan Redmond looked threatening and almost broke the deadlock early on when he beat James Ward-Prowse but dragged his shot narrowly wide. As the game began to open up, the Saints were denied a clear penalty when Bradley Johnson blocked a shot from Adam Lallana, and from there the visitors increased their pressure with attempts on goal from Victor Wanyama and Osvaldo; captain Lallana came the closest to scoring for Southampton, when his left-footed volley from a clearance hit the post with goalkeeper John Ruddy beaten.

After the break, Southampton continued their pressure from the first half, winning corners and trying to set up chances through the midfield, but the Canaries quickly returned with chances for Leroy Fer, Robert Snodgrass, and Johan Elmander denied by Artur Boruc and the Saints defence. In the 68th minute, having been Norwich's most dangerous player for much of the match, Nathan Redmond cut in from the wing, beating Ward-Prowse and Wanyama, and scored from outside the penalty area, putting Norwich one up. With Gastón Ramírez, Steven Davis, and Jay Rodriguez on at various points from just before the goal, the Saints continued to make their attacking intent known, but John Ruddy performed well to keep Saints out and give them their first loss of the season.

West Ham United (15 September 2013)

Following the international break, Southampton hosted fellow 2012 promotees West Ham United on 15 September. The Hammers dominated the opening exchanges of the game, with Mohamed Diamé coming close to scoring when he beat Luke Shaw to get an early shot on goal, but the Saints responded quickly to provide a chance for Dani Osvaldo, who was denied his first goal for the club by an agile save from Jussi Jääskeläinen. The hosts started the second half the dominant side, as Rickie Lambert hit the post with a header and Adam Lallana missed a one-on-one chance with Jääskeläinen, and the West Ham goalkeeper continued to perform as he denied a Morgan Schneiderlin close-range volley and later an Osvaldo chance from the wing. James Collins almost scored for West Ham in the last ten minutes, but his shot went over the crossbar, and despite some late pressure from the Saints the game ended goalless.

Liverpool (21 September 2013)

On 21 September, Southampton travelled to Anfield to face unbeaten league leaders Liverpool. The visitors started the game relatively well, but it was the home captain Steven Gerrard who had the best chance in the first half when his free kick was denied only by a strong save from Artur Boruc. After the break, Adam Lallana had a great chance for the Saints when Liverpool goalkeeper Simon Mignolet made a mistake, and it was Southampton who took the lead less than ten minutes into the second half when defender Dejan Lovren headed in Lallana's corner for his first goal for the club. Dani Osvaldo almost immediately made it two for the Saints, before Gerrard replicated his early free kick only to be equalled again by Boruc. Luke Shaw also had a chance following a long run through the middle of the pitch, before José Fonte denied Jordan Henderson from equalising for the hosts, giving Southampton three points to move up to initially fifth, although they then moved down a place to sixth after Chelsea's win against Fulham later that day.

Crystal Palace (28 September 2013)

Southampton welcomed newly promoted Crystal Palace to St Mary's on 28 September. The first chance fell to Southampton midfielder Morgan Schneiderlin who had a looping header cleared off the line by Joel Ward. The main talking point of a disappointing first half came as Marouane Chamakh was booked for diving in the penalty area when rounding Saints goalkeeper Artur Boruc, when he went to ground instead of choosing to shoot. Just two minutes after the restart, however, Saints' record signing Dani Osvaldo opened the scoring with a drilled left-footed shot from the edge of the penalty area after good work from Nathaniel Clyne and Adam Lallana down the right. Two minutes after that, Osvaldo was brought down on the left side of the penalty area, and Rickie Lambert scored a superb free-kick which went in off the inside of the post. It was his 200th league goal and first since the opening day of the season. Each side made multiple changes, and Southampton almost scored a third but Jay Rodriguez was just offside after turning in a cross from Luke Shaw. In the end, it was a comfortable victory for Saints, and Palace failed to register a single shot on target. Southampton finished the day fourth in the table, although they moved down to fifth on Sunday.

Swansea City (6 October 2013)

The following week, Southampton hosted Swansea City, who had won their last three games in a row. The visitors started the game brightly, challenging Artur Boruc's goal early through Michu and Jonjo Shelvey, although the Saints responded in kind through Dani Osvaldo who almost forced Swansea goalkeeper Michel Vorm into a mistake. Southampton continued to push on, as Rickie Lambert and Morgan Schneiderlin enjoyed chances, and in the 19th minute the deadlock was broken when captain Adam Lallana picked up his own cross from Steven Davis after a defensive error and slotted the ball home for 1–0 and his first goal of the season. The hosts continued to pressurise the Swans, and Lallana almost scored a second shortly after the first, although the visitors responded in kind, again through Michu and Shelvey, and former Southampton player Nathan Dyer almost equalised on the stroke of half-time. Swansea's two leading players continued to enjoy chances throughout the second period, but it was Southampton who had the ball in the net next in the 76th minute, although this was disallowed for an infringement in the build-up. Ten minutes later though, the Saints finally capitalised on their continued pressure and Jay Rodriguez took advantage of a defensive error to double their lead and end the game.

Manchester United (19 October 2013)

Following another international break, Southampton travelled to Old Trafford to face Premier League champions Manchester United. Southampton started the game quickly, pushing up from the opening kick-off in an attacking manner, although the home side defended well against their chances. Despite dominating the opening exchanges though, it was the visitors' goal that was tested first as a low strike by Robin van Persie was saved by Artur Boruc, although Victor Wanyama quickly took a shot himself before Dani Osvaldo had the best chance of the opening half from inside the penalty area, scuffing it into the hands of David de Gea. It was the hosts who struck first though, putting the ball in the back of the net only for it to be called back for offside, before Wayne Rooney got in behind the Saints defence and forced a decent save out of Boruc, allowing van Persie to come in and strike the ball home for 1–0. Rooney almost doubled United's lead minutes later when he hit the crossbar from a Patrice Evra cross, and despite additional pressure from the Saints it was United who went into half-time in the better position.

In the second half, Southampton started like they had the first at high pace, forcing a corner for themselves after the opening five minutes, from which Dejan Lovren saw his header cleared off the line by goalscorer van Persie. Rickie Lambert came on as a substitute for Jay Rodriguez after 56 minutes, but it was the champions who continued to dominate when Rooney scored another only to be flagged for offside once again, and Artur Boruc was called into action once again when he made a one-handed save from teenager Adnan Januzaj's accurate shot from outside the penalty box. James Ward-Prowse came on ten minutes after Lambert, and almost set Osvaldo up from a free kick, and Adam Lallana enjoyed one of his side's best chances when he tested De Gea from the edge of the area with a low strike on 73 minutes. Southampton continued the high-pace push for a goal, and Morgan Schneiderlin came close after a long run down the pitch when ended in a wide shot, but the game remained in the hosts' favour until the last minute of normal time: Ward-Prowse whipped in a corner, Lovren got on the end of it, and Lallana got the final touch as the ball went under De Gea for the equaliser. Despite five minutes of additional time, the Saints held on to keep their unbeaten record and remain fifth (after all results of the day).

Fulham (26 October 2013)

Southampton returned to St Mary's the following week to face a struggling Fulham side. Largely dominating from the start of the match, the Saints enjoyed an early chance when Morgan Schneiderlin had a side-footed shot cleared off the line, but could not break through and open the scoring. The hosts continued to pressure the visitors' goal, including a long effort going narrowly wide from Victory Wanyama, before a James Ward-Prowse corner was flicked onto the back post by Jay Rodriguez where Rickie Lambert was on hand to head in for 1–0. Rodriguez nearly made it two just a minute later after running through a number of Fulham defenders, but his shot lacked enough power to really challenge the goal, and the visiting side enjoyed their first attack of the game shortly after when Kieran Richardson crossed in for Dimitar Berbatov only for Artur Boruc to catch comfortably. Southampton's league top scorer Lambert almost scored his and the team's second in the ten minutes before half-time, first hitting the post from 20 yards and then seeing another back post header saved, but it was two for the Saints when Lambert headed on a cross from captain Adam Lallana to Jay Rodriguez, who scored a goal similar to Lambert's earlier in the half with a header from the back post.

In the second half, Southampton continued to play with a high pressure, attacking through Luke Shaw and Lambert early after the break; Wanyama, Dejan Lovren, and Rodriguez also enjoyed early chances to make it 3–0 for the Saints, while Fulham remained on the back foot. Rodriguez almost scored a stunning third for his side in the 69th minute, meeting Ward-Prowse's cross with an acrobatic volley that went just wide of Maarten Stekelenburg's goal, and the home side continued to dominate possession and chances until Steve Sidwell had Fulham's only chance of the second half, hooking a chance wide. The game finished 2–0 to Southampton, taking them up to third place in the Premier League table, unbeaten since the end of August.

=== November–December 2013 ===
Stoke City (2 November 2013)

On 2 November, Southampton travelled to face Stoke City at the Britannia Stadium. The visiting Saints went a goal down after just 15 seconds, when Stoke goalkeeper Asmir Begović cleared from his penalty area and the ball bounced over the misplaced Artur Boruc to put the home side 1–0 up. It could have been two just minutes later, firstly when Ryan Shawcross scuffed a shot wide from a corner in the 8th minute, and secondly when Peter Crouch crossed for Marko Arnautović to head wide. Southampton retaliated though, and Dejan Lovren almost scored an early equaliser a couple of minutes later but his header bounced over the Stoke crossbar. After recovering from the initial surprise goal, the Saints went on to dominate possession throughout the majority of the first half, and while chances were shared between both sides, it was the visitors who struck next when Jay Rodriguez scored his third in four games to equalise just before half time, heading in a James Ward-Prowse corner.

It was the hosts who enjoyed the early chances in the second half, including one for Arnautović who forced a decent save from Boruc in the Southampton goal. Saints had a call for a penalty minutes later, when a cross from Nathaniel Clyne looked to hit a Stoke defender's hand on its way into the box; seconds later, a free kick was given just outside the area when Morgan Schneiderlin was forced off the ball unfairly by Stoke defenders, which was put just inches over the crossbar by Ward-Prowse. The game continued in much the same fashion, with the Saints continuing with most of the possession but Stoke enjoying their fair share of chances, and the home side almost scored on two separate occasions in the last ten minutes through substitute Oussama Assaidi and Arnautović. The last action came in the 89th minute when the ball appeared to strike Shawcross's hand in the area, leading to a strong penalty claim from Southampton players, but the game ended 1–1 and the Saints remained in fifth place (sixth after the following day's results).

Hull City (9 November 2013)

The following week, the Saints hosted newly promoted Hull City. The home side started the game quickly, with chances from corners and crosses early on, and the scoring was opened after just 16 minutes when Nathaniel Clyne crossed for Rickie Lambert at the far post, who headed the ball into the path of Morgan Schneiderlin to score his first goal of the season. Southampton continued to attack and defend well, and just before the half-hour mark the team were awarded a penalty for a foul on recent England call-up Adam Lallana, who had been put through by fellow international Rickie Lambert, who then converted the spot kick for 2–0. The home side continued to assert their attacking dominance, and they quickly added a third when Lallana took the ball on a long solo run past a number of Hull City defenders before striking low for 3–0.

With their three-goal advantage, Southampton continued to play well in all areas of the field, although some sloppy play early after the break gave the visitors a few sights at goal for the first time in the game, one of which Hull took advantage after 55 minutes when Yannick Sagbo scored from a Victor Wanyama mistake. A few minutes later though, José Fonte almost scored a volley from a corner, and Luke Shaw almost connected with a Rickie Lambert cross, before Lallana had an opportunity for his second denied by Hull goalkeeper Steve Harper. With Steven Davis and Dani Osvaldo coming on later in the game, Southampton's attacking dominance continued to culminate in a fourth goal for the home side in the 88th minute when Davis turned in a cross from Clyne to seal the victory. The fourth consecutive home win for the Saints (the first time the club had achieved this in the top flight since 1999) saw them move up to third place in the table.

Arsenal (23 November 2013)

Following another international break, during which Jay Rodriguez received his first cap for England and Adam Lallana played his second international game, Premier League action returned with third-placed Southampton facing league leaders Arsenal at the Emirates Stadium, with summer signing Dejan Lovren missing his first league game of the season through injury. Both sides started the game well, and Southampton began to find their feet early with set piece opportunities for James Ward-Prowse to try to provide chances to open the scoring falling flat, but it was the hosts who almost struck first when a cross-come-shot from Jack Wilshere hit the post only to come back out for Artur Boruc to claim. Rodriguez and Lallana worked hard to pressure the Arsenal goal, but again the London side hit the post through an Aaron Ramsey back-heel off a Mesut Özil cross, signalling their intent to attack; on 22 minutes this culminated in the first goal, when in the Southampton goal Boruc chose to play the ball instead of clearing it only for Olivier Giroud to pounce on the hesitance to open the scoring. For the rest of the first period the Saints pressured Arsenal a lot more through corners and free-kicks, with Rodriguez, Lambert, and Ward-Prowse all working together to creating chances which were ultimately kept out by the hosts.

After taking a knock in the first half, Luke Shaw was replaced with Steven Davis, which led a number of players to move into different, unorthodox positions, but despite this the visitors came out strongly after the break with chances for Lallana and Rodriguez. Lallana was replaced by Dani Osvaldo, and Arsenal retaliated with a long spell of high pressure on the Southampton goal – first Özil tested Boruc from inside the area, then Wilshere headed close to the goalkeeper. Osvaldo struck low to be denied by home keeper Wojciech Szczęsny, and some interplay between Victor Wanyama, Nathaniel Clyne, and Jay Rodriguez set up Rickie Lambert whose shot was deflected out for a corner. With Southampton still enjoying much of the possession and chances going into the latter stages of the game, Arsenal were awarded a penalty for shirt tugging in the box by José Fonte, which Giroud converted coolly for his and his team's second, sealing the game for the league leaders. Following Chelsea's result later in the day, the Saints moved down to fourth in the Premier League table.

Chelsea (1 December 2013)

Southampton travelled to face Chelsea the following week, and started the game well with a goal within 15 seconds as Jay Rodriguez took advantage of a mistake by Michael Essien to open the scoring early for the Saints with his fourth league goal of the season. Chelsea slowly regained their feet, with defender Gary Cahill heading wide from a corner minutes later, with both sides attacking freely throughout the opening exchanges. A shot from Oscar tested Artur Boruc in goal, and Saints responded with a couple of free kicks from James Ward-Prowse which came close to challenging the Chelsea goal. The home side continued to pressure the visitors though, as Oscar headed a Fernando Torres cross to force Boruc into a good save to his right before the half ended with the Saints in front.

With Demba Ba on for the hosts, Chelsea began the second half as they had ended the first, dominating the majority of the attacks in the early exchanges, with Torres coming close to equalising within minutes of the restart but for a block by Victor Wanyama. Chelsea continued the high pressure on Southampton, and after ten minutes they equalised through Cahill who headed in from close range; during the goal, Boruc received an injury to his hand, and was replaced by Paulo Gazzaniga for his first league appearance of the season. Less than ten minutes later though, the Blues scored a second as John Terry headed in a cross from Juan Mata on what was his 400th league appearance for the club. Rickie Lambert came on later in the half, but it was not enough to break down a resilient Chelsea side who secured victory in the final minute through a Demba Ba conversion, leaving Southampton seventh in the league table.

Aston Villa (4 December 2013)

Southampton were back in action just three days later, returning to St Mary's to try to regain their winning ways against Aston Villa. The Saints began the game in the driving seat as captain Adam Lallana enjoyed numerous goal-scoring chances early on, one of which struck the crossbar; Jay Rodriguez also had a few chances, hitting the post with a long-range effort around 15 minutes. In the 16th minute though, against the run of play, Fabian Delph played a through ball to Gabriel Agbonlahor who beat defenders Maya Yoshida and Dejan Lovren before converting past Paulo Gazzaniga to put Villa one up. The goal saw the momentum switch over to the visitors briefly, but the hosts responded with headed efforts from Jay Rodriguez and Dejan Lovren, and later shots on goal from Luke Shaw and Steven Davis, before Dani Osvaldo was brought on as a tactical attacking replacement for James Ward-Prowse just before half-time.

Despite an early chance on goal for Villa, the Saints quickly responded with an equalising goal in the 48th minute as Rodriguez headed in Nathaniel Clyne's accurate cross past Brad Guzan in the visitors' goal. After Clyne picked up an injury and was replaced by José Fonte, Southampton adopted an unorthodox formation with only three defenders, and shortly after the hour mark they went two down through Czech striker Libor Kozák. Once again the Saints responded quickly, with Osvaldo heading in from a Lambert header for his second of the season and the team's second of the match. Aston Villa secured the win ten minutes from time, as Fabian Delph scored with a long-range strike from outside of the penalty area, giving Gazzaniga no chance of preventing the 3–2 scoreline. Despite their apparent domination (78% possession, 21 shots and 9 on target to Villa's 6 and 3), Southampton picked up their first home defeat of the season and their third overall defeat in a row, dropping further to eighth in the table.

Manchester City (7 December 2013)

The busy set of fixtures continued as Southampton played their third game in seven days against title contenders Manchester City at St Mary's Stadium on 7 December. With Clyne and Wanyama injured in the game against Aston Villa, youngster Calum Chambers and Jack Cork returned to the side, with Paulo Gazzaniga still in goal with Artur Boruc out too. Man City started the game strongly, with a chance for James Milner being thwarted by a last-ditch tackle from Dejan Lovren early on, and it was the visitors who struck first within 10 minutes through top scorer Sergio Agüero. City continued to enjoy chances in the Southampton half, but the hosts slowly responded with a corner and a free-kick providing decent scoring chances, while Osvaldo and Cork also enjoyed chances from open play. With more pressure being applied from the Saints, with Ward-Prowse and Lovren amongst those nearly equalising, on 42 minutes Osvaldo scored his second in two games, beating Vincent Kompany and other City defenders before curling an effort from range into the far corner of the goal, putting Saints on level terms going into the break.

Southampton looked to continue where they had left off in the second half, pressuring the City half quickly and continuously; it remained an open game though, as the visitors also enjoyed several promising attacks in the early exchanges. Rodriguez almost put Southampton in the lead after a one-on-one with goalkeeper Costel Pantilimon, before Osvaldo struck over the crossbar from the rebound; Osvaldo and Steven Davis continued to pressure the City goal, enjoying a few more chances in the next ten minutes. The visitors constantly responded in kind, with Agüero at the centre of most of their pressure, and Aleksandar Kolarov also received a couple of chances to put his team ahead again. A number of free-kicks came to nothing late in the game, and the open contest finished as a draw which saw the Saints pick up their first point in almost a month.

Newcastle United (14 December 2013)

Southampton travelled north to face Newcastle United the following week. The hosts dominated the early exchanges of the game, winning three corners within the first five minutes of play to put the visiting Saints on the defensive early on. United almost scored in the 11th minute, as Loïc Rémy's close range shot was denied only by a well-placed Calum Chambers on the goal line. The match remained open and competitive, and in the 27th minute the hosts took the lead through Yoan Gouffran, who simply had to pick up the ball in the six-yard box after weak defending of a Newcastle free-kick. Throughout the remaining 20 minutes of the first half, the hosts dominated the majority of possession and goal-scoring opportunities, with Southampton enjoying only a few minor chances on goal, leaving Newcastle in the lead going into the break.

Adam Lallana and Morgan Schneiderlin came on at half-time, and the Saints showed a little more creativity going forward in the second half as a result, although it remained an open, even contest. Some well-worked interplay between Lallana and Rickie Lambert almost culminated in a good chance for Jay Rodriguez, but for some last-minute defending, and Steven Davis also showed some attacking prowess throughout the second half but to be denied by in-form goalkeeper Tim Krul. Southampton eventually did make an attack count though, as Davis worked closely with Rodriguez on the attack to set the striker up for a straightforward conversion to bring the visitors level. The remainder of the game was a very open contest, with both sides enjoying chances on goal throughout the last 25 minutes, but despite an additional six minutes of added time, neither side could take the initiative to win the game.

Tottenham Hotspur (21 December 2013)

In their final game before Christmas, Southampton returned home to face Tottenham Hotspur, who had recently seen manager André Villas-Boas replaced by former player Tim Sherwood. After a slow start to the game which saw Spurs threaten early with a corner, the Saints provided Rickie Lambert with chances through Calum Chambers and Jack Cork crosses in the seventh minute, but there was no finish on the end. It was the home side who took the advantage and broke the deadlock though, as full-back Danny Fox played in captain Adam Lallana who calmly converted the finish to put the Saints 1–0 up within 13 minutes. Tottenham responded with a period of attacking pressure, and in the 25th minute they made it count through Emmanuel Adebayor, who volleyed in Roberto Soldado's well weighted cross to make it 1–1. The visitors continued to pressure the hosts following the goal, but the half ended with the teams level.

Southampton attempted to score straight away from the kick-off in the second half through a move orchestrated by Lambert and Schneiderlin, but it was cleared before it could come to fruition. With Southampton continuing to drive the game, against the run of play it was Spurs who took the lead next, as Jos Hooiveld turned a cross into his own net at the near post. The Saints recovered quickly though, as five minutes later Rickie Lambert equalised following a quick break and a clever back-pass from Adam Lallana. The fast-paced game remained open though, and another five minutes later Spurs struck again to go 3–2 up, with Adebayor scoring his second of the game following a cross from Kyle Walker that was knocked on by substitute Nacer Chadli. Following their third goal, Spurs went on to dominate the majority of the rest of the game, enjoying numerous chances which meant they could have scored four or more, mainly through Soldado. Young substitute striker Sam Gallagher enjoyed his first chance on goal late on, but the Spurs continued to dominate and held on to take all three points, leaving Southampton in ninth position in the table, their worst since September.

Cardiff City (26 December 2013)

On Boxing Day, the Saints travelled to face struggling Cardiff City. Southampton started the game strongly, with Calum Chambers, Adam Lallana, and Steven Davis orchestrating early attacking moves, although it was the hosts who had the first real sight of goal when a cross from Craig Noone was missed by Peter Whittingham from six yards out. It was the visitors who broke the deadlock in the 14th minute though, as Morgan Schneiderlin passed from within his own half to Adam Lallana, who squared it across the area for Jay Rodriguez to convert for 1–0. Rodriguez and Southampton quickly doubled their lead in the 20th minute, when a move involving Luke Shaw, Steven Davis, and Rickie Lambert culminated in a simple conversion from a cross for the season's top scorer. Southampton continued to pressurise the hosts, enjoying a host of attacking moves over the next few minutes, and just seven minutes after their second the Saints scored a third, with Lambert getting on the scoresheet from a Chambers cross knocked on by Rodriguez.

After the break, Morgan Schneiderlin received his fifth booking of the season, ruling him out for the next game, and it was Cardiff who came out stronger in the early exchanges looking to get a goal back on the leading Saints. Another move involving Rodriguez saw Luke Shaw almost score his first for the club, before Jack Cork saw his long-range effort saved and the Saints left-back tested the Cardiff goalkeeper again with no luck. Despite a few efforts for the home side, it was the visitors who looked the most likely to score next, with chances coming for Rodriguez and Lambert in quick succession, and the Saints cruised to a 3–0 victory, their first win since November.

Everton (29 December 2013)

In their final game of 2013, Southampton travelled north to face Everton at Goodison Park. The hosts started the game quickly, with midfielder Ross Barkley enjoying the first chance on goal early on from a Séamus Coleman cross, and it was Coleman who opened the scoring in the ninth minute with a strike into the top corner from just inside the penalty area. Southampton responded as Steven Davis and Rickie Lambert linked up for a chance on goal, and both sides saw chances go astray due to controversial decisions by referee Mark Clattenburg, Everton claiming a penalty and Saints disputing an offside ruling. As half-time approached, Everton almost doubled their lead through Bryan Oviedo, but for the defensive performance of José Fonte, before Adam Lallana enjoyed a chance at the other end but dragged his shot wide after being two Everton defenders.

The Saints almost scored immediately in the second half as Luke Shaw crossed in for Lallana, but the captain missed his chance to equalise for the visitors. Ten minutes after the break, Ross Barkley almost made it two for Everton when he side-footed a cross from Oviedo inches wide of the post; the rest of the game remained an open, attacking affair, with Southampton almost equalising through Rodriguez before Gastón Ramírez finally did equalise with a long-range effort that beat the Everton goalkeeper. Less than three minutes later though, the scoreline was back in Everton's favour as Romelu Lukaku scored from the edge of the area, and just minutes later he almost scored a second but his shot went over the crossbar. The visitors tried to get back into the game, but Lukaku almost scored again for the hosts late on, and they held on for the three points.

=== January–February 2014 ===
Chelsea (1 January 2014)

On New Year's Day 2014, Southampton hosted Chelsea, to whom they'd lost 3–1 at Stamford Bridge just a month previously. Another openly attacking contest, Chelsea enjoyed the majority of early chances through Fernando Torres, who first had an opportunity to cross for his teammates and then saw a dangerous shot on goal blocked by José Fonte. After a few minutes of stoppage for two separate injuries, Chelsea returned to the attack through Ramires, who saw his one-on-one chance with Kelvin Davis saved by the Saints goalkeeper; the hosts tried to counter-attack through Gastón Ramírez and Adam Lallana, but the defence of the Blues remained strong to prevent any chance on goal. The rest of the first half saw end-to-end action, with both teams seeing attacks thwarted by strong defences; one of the best chances of the half fell again to Ramires, but Davis reacted well to tip the shot over the crossbar.

As with their home fixture on 1 December 2013, Chelsea had failed to score in the first half, but with a double substitution less than ten minutes into the second half they returned strongly. Substitute Oscar was at the centre of a penalty claim shortly after coming on, receiving a booking for simulation, but it wasn't long before he was at the centre of his side's opening goal, as his deflected cross was met by Fernando Torres who calmly converted for 1–0 on the hour mark. Both Oscar and second substitute Willian were at the centre of the attacking play, and 11 minutes after the opener the latter scored for Chelsea to double their lead away from home. Despite making tactical substitutions, Southampton saw very little of the game in its late stages, and in the 82nd minute Oscar capped his impressive performance with a goal to seal the victory and the points for the Blues.

West Bromwich Albion (11 January 2014)

Southampton's next game was the return leg of the opening game of the season against West Bromwich Albion, a game which saw the long-awaited return of first choice goalkeeper Artur Boruc. The Saints started the game well, attacking from the start and dominating possession early on; the first shot on goal came for Adam Lallana, who had worked with Morgan Schneiderlin to test goalkeeper Ben Foster within ten minutes. Rickie Lambert had a chance shortly after, before West Brom went on the attack and won a corner to test the Saints goal for the first time. Throughout the rest of the first half, it was the hosts who were largely on top of the game, with Steven Davis, Jack Cork, Luke Shaw, and Jay Rodriguez all enjoying chances on goal; the Baggies responded between attacks with periods of possession, often ended by a foul and a free-kick on goal. Despite the attacking nature of the game, it remained goalless at the break.

As in the first, Southampton started the second period at a high tempo, immediately attacking the visitors' goal through Schneiderlin and, a few minutes later, Rodriguez, who almost added to his top-scoring tally in the 51st minute. After the hour mark, Gastón Ramírez was brought on for Cork, and he almost immediately made an impact; shortly after testing Foster with a free-kick, the Uruguayan midfielder played a pass into captain Lallana who could roll the ball underneath the West Brom goalkeeper to make it 1–0. The introduction of striker Saido Berahino by the visitors gave them some more pace up front, and Matěj Vydra also came on late in the game; both made impacts, but it was Shane Long who had the best chance to equalise in the last minute of normal time, but he was denied by a reaction save by the returning Boruc to keep Southampton in front. Guly do Prado came on for the first time since October just before injury time, and Southampton held on for the victory to pick up their first win since Boxing Day.

Sunderland (18 January 2014)

Southampton travelled to the Stadium of Light on 18 January to face strugglers Sunderland. The visitors started the game well, as Jay Rodriguez was able to open the scoring in the fourth minute from a Morgan Schneiderlin setup. The Saints continued to dominate much of possession, with Sunderland enjoying very few chances in the opening minutes; Jack Cork and Luke Shaw also enjoyed chances on goal, as the Southampton defence kept the hosts from testing Artur Boruc, before centre-back Dejan Lovren made it two for the Saints in the 31st minute with a volley from inside the penalty area. Just two minutes later, though, Sunderland were back in the game as Fabio Borini scored for the hosts.

Both sides started the second half well, with possession and chances changing hands regularly in the opening exchanges, before Southampton once again asserted their dominance through attacks by Shaw, Calum Chambers, and Rodriguez. In the 71st minute, it was the Black Cats who struck the next blow through Adam Johnson. In the last ten minutes, the Saints suffered two serious injuries which forced substitutions and cast doubt over the remainder of the players' seasons – first, Gastón Ramírez was brought down by Wes Brown in a challenge which warranted no foul or booking, before goalscorer Lovren suffered an injury to his leg in a challenge. Both were replaced, but despite increased pressure from the Saints they were unable to recover their lead.

Arsenal (28 January 2014)

On 28 January the Saints hosted league leaders Arsenal at St Mary's Stadium. With 18-year-old striker Sam Gallagher starting for the senior team for the first time, Southampton enjoyed the majority of possession in the opening exchanges, with Gallagher enjoying a number of early chances to open the scoring. After continuing to play confidently against the league leaders, the hosts opened the scoring just after 20 minutes when José Fonte headed in a cross from Luke Shaw at the far post for his second goal of the campaign. Arsenal remained on the back foot for the remainder of the first half, as Adam Lallana created and received a number of chances to add a second; Gallagher had arguably the best chance of the half from six yards out, but steered his shot wide to leave the score at 1–0 going into the break.

Despite Southampton's dominance in the first 45 minutes, it was Arsenal who came out after the break the stronger side; with just 48 minutes on the clock, Olivier Giroud back-heeled Bacary Sagna's cross past Artur Boruc to level the score. Just a few minutes later, the visitors took the lead for the first time in the match, as Santi Cazorla struck into the bottom corner, but the Saints reacted quickly to equalise once again through captain Lallana from Jay Rodriguez. After three goals in under ten minutes, the game opened up with both sides attacking freely in an effort to find a goal to break the deadlock, with Morgan Schneiderlin almost scoring again quickly but for a header off the goal line. Mathieu Flamini was sent off late in the match, and Southampton almost made the one-man advantage count twice in the closing stages of the game, first through a dangerous ball from Shaw which needed to be tipped over, and then from a low shot by Fonte, which was also saved.

Fulham (1 February 2014)

The following Saturday, Southampton travelled to Craven Cottage to face struggling club Fulham. Despite sitting in the relegation zone, the hosts started the game well, with Scott Parker and Dan Burn having early shots on goal. New Fulham signing Lewis Holtby settled in well and created a number of chances throughout the first half, while returning Saints midfielder Victor Wanyama was cautioned a number of times for fouls; Artur Boruc performed well on a number of occasions to prevent the hosts from opening the scoring, saving two shots by Darren Bent in quick succession.

In the second half, Southampton improved in their attacking prowess, with half-time substitute Jack Cork setting up a chance early in the half which involved Jay Rodriguez, Adam Lallana and Morgan Schneiderlin whose overhead kick went over the bar at the end of the move. Around the hour mark, Lallana came close to scoring, and in the 64th minute he finally broke the deadlock for the visitors, striking low inside the box from a Rickie Lambert setup. With the advantage secured, Saints continued pressuring the hosts, and just over five minutes later Lambert scored his own and the side's second with a simple conversion from a low Nathaniel Clyne cross. Southampton's England international potentials linked up once again another six minutes later, as Lambert passed to Jay Rodriguez on the edge of the box, who curled in for 3–0. Southampton saw the rest of the game out, securing the three points and making up ground on Newcastle United in 8th.

Stoke City (8 February 2014)

Southampton returned to St Mary's the following week to face Stoke City, with whom they had drawn in their previous three consecutive encounters. The home side started the game well, as Rickie Lambert scored his eighth league goal of the season to opening the scoring in the sixth minute, placing a free-kick awarded for a handball by Charlie Adam into the top corner of Stoke's goal. Artur Boruc denied January signing Peter Odemwingie in the next attack from the visitors, before the side returned to the attack with Jay Rodriguez the main threat up front. The Potters retaliated valiantly though, with Jonathan Walters joining Odemwingie on the offence, and on 38 minutes it was the winger who levelled for Stoke in a one-on-one with Boruc set up by Adam. The score wasn't level for long, however, as a cross by Steven Davis from the right wing continued through the box into the far corner of the goal just three minutes later. The fourth goal of the match came equally as quickly though, as former Saints striker Peter Crouch bundled in from a Charlie Adam corner against his former club to make it 2–2 at the break.

The Saints attempted to regain their lead for the third time early in the first half, failing to score firstly from a free-kick and secondly from a corner, while Stoke enjoyed their fair share of chances as well. The hosts were frustrated by Stoke's resilient defending in their search for a third goal, and despite continuing the high pressure against the visitors they were unable to score again, with the draw leaving them in 9th for yet another game.

Hull City (11 February 2014)

In midweek, the Saints travelled to face fellow mid-table side Hull City. Starting quickly, the side dominated the early exchanges, with Jay Rodriguez and Adam Lallana combining well in the opening minutes before being dispossessed by the Hull defence, a move replicated by Lallana and Rickie Lambert shortly afterwards. Rodriguez continued to threaten the hosts' goal as his header from Lallana's corner was headed off the line around the ten-minute mark, while Artur Boruc was never truly tested by Hull's attackers, who were forced to make speculative efforts on goal.

After the break, the Saints continued with their high-pressure style of attacking, and finally in the 69th minute they made their pressure count, with José Fonte making his touch count in a goalmouth scramble to score his third of the season and his side's first of the game. Substitute Guly do Prado also got involved in a couple of late chances on goal, but both sides fought it out to the end and it ended 1–0 to Southampton. The win saw Southampton rise to 8th in the table, moving from 9th position for the first time since December.

=== Results and league positions ===
17 August 2013 1	West Bromwich Albion	0–1	Southampton	West Bromwich
15:00 BST		Report	Lambert 90' (pen.)	Stadium: The Hawthorns; Attendance: 25,927; Referee: Kevin Friend

24 August 2013 2	Southampton	1–1	Sunderland	Southampton
15:00 BST	Fonte 88'	Report	Giaccherini 3'	Stadium: St. Mary's Stadium; Attendance: 29,596; Referee: Lee Mason

31 August 2013 3	Norwich City	1–0	Southampton	Norwich
15:00 BST	Redmond 68'	Report		Stadium: Carrow Road; Attendance: 26,819; Referee: Howard Webb

15 September 2013 4	Southampton	0–0	West Ham United	Southampton
16:00 BST		Report		Stadium: St. Mary's Stadium; Attendance: 28,794; Referee: Andre Marriner

21 September 2013 5	Liverpool	0–1	Southampton	Liverpool
15:00 BST		Report	Lovren 53'	Stadium: Anfield; Attendance: 44,755; Referee: Neil Swarbrick

28 September 2013 6	Southampton	2–0	Crystal Palace	Southampton
15:00 BST	Osvaldo 47'; Lambert 49'	Report		Stadium: St. Mary's Stadium; Attendance: 30,699; Referee: Martin Atkinson

6 October 2013 7	Southampton	2–0	Swansea City	Southampton
13:30 BST	Lallana 19'; Rodriguez 83'	Report		Stadium: St. Mary's Stadium; Attendance: 28,570; Referee: Mike Dean

19 October 2013 8	Manchester United	1–1	Southampton	Manchester
15:00 BST	Van Persie 26'	Report	Lallana 89'	Stadium: Old Trafford; Attendance: 75,220; Referee: Mike Jones

26 October 2013 9	Southampton	2–0	Fulham	Southampton
17:30 BST	Lambert 20'; Rodriguez 42'	Report		Stadium: St. Mary's Stadium; Attendance: 28,631; Referee: Andre Marriner

2 November 2013 10	Stoke City	1–1	Southampton	Stoke-on-Trent
15:00 GMT	Begović 1'	Report	Rodriguez 42'	Stadium: Britannia Stadium; Attendance: 26,053; Referee: Chris Foy

9 November 2013 11	Southampton	4–1	Hull City	Southampton
15:00 GMT	Schneiderlin 16'; Lambert 30' (pen.); Lallana 37'; Davis 88'	Report	Sagbo 55'	Stadium: St. Mary's Stadium; Attendance: 30,022; Referee: Phil Dowd

23 November 2013 12	Arsenal	2–0	Southampton	London
15:15 GMT	Giroud 22', 86' (pen.)	Report		Stadium: Emirates Stadium; Attendance: 60,007; Referee: Mark Clattenburg

1 December 2013 13	Chelsea	3–1	Southampton	London
16:10 GMT	Cahill 55'; Terry 62'; Ba 90'	Report	Rodriguez 1'	Stadium: Stamford Bridge; Attendance: 41,568; Referee: Michael Oliver

4 December 2013 14	Southampton	2–3	Aston Villa	Southampton
19:45 GMT	Rodriguez 48'; Osvaldo 69'	Report	Agbonlahor 15'; Kozák 64'; Delph 80'	Stadium: St. Mary's Stadium; Attendance: 29,814; Referee: Jonathan Moss

7 December 2013 15	Southampton	1–1	Manchester City	Southampton
15:00 GMT	Osvaldo 42'	Report	Agüero 10'	Stadium: St. Mary's Stadium; Attendance: 31,229; Referee: Anthony Taylor

14 December 2013 16	Newcastle United	1–1	Southampton	Newcastle upon Tyne
15:00 GMT	Gouffran 27'	Report	Rodriguez 65'	Stadium: St. James' Park; Attendance: 49,164; Referee: Mike Jones

21 December 2013 17	Southampton	2–3	Tottenham Hotspur	Southampton
15:00 GMT	Lallana 13'; Lambert 59'	Report	Adebayor 25', 64'; Hooiveld 54' (o.g.)	Stadium: St. Mary's Stadium; Attendance: 31,455; Referee: Chris Foy

26 December 2013 18	Cardiff City	0–3	Southampton	Cardiff
15:00 GMT		Report	Rodriguez 14', 21'; Lambert 27'	Stadium: Cardiff City Stadium; Attendance: 27,929; Referee: Andre Marriner

29 December 2013 19	Everton	2–1	Southampton	Liverpool
13:30 GMT	Coleman 9'; Lukaku 74'	Report	Ramírez 71'	Stadium: Goodison Park; Attendance: 39,092; Referee: Mark Clattenburg

1 January 2014 20	Southampton	0–3	Chelsea	Southampton
15:00 GMT		Report	Torres 60'; Willian 71'; Oscar 82'	Stadium: St Mary's Stadium; Attendance: 31,271; Referee: Martin Atkinson

11 January 2014 21	Southampton	1–0	West Bromwich Albion	Southampton
15:00 GMT	Lallana 66'	Report		Stadium: St Mary's Stadium; Attendance: 28,610; Referee: Howard Webb

18 January 2014 22	Sunderland	2–2	Southampton	Sunderland
15:00 GMT	Borini 32'; Johnson 71'	Report	Rodriguez 4'; Lovren 31'	Stadium: Stadium of Light; Attendance: 38,115; Referee: Chris Foy

28 January 2014 23	Southampton	2–2	Arsenal	Southampton
19:45 GMT	Fonte 21'; Lallana 54'	Report	Giroud 48'; Cazorla 52'	Stadium: St Mary's Stadium; Attendance: 31,284; Referee: Lee Mason

1 February 2014 24	Fulham	0–3	Southampton	London
15:00 GMT		Report	Lallana 64'; Lambert 70'; Rodriguez 75'	Stadium: Craven Cottage; Attendance: 25,700; Referee: Mike Jones

8 February 2014 25	Southampton	2–2	Stoke City	Southampton
15:00 GMT	Lambert 6'; Davis 41'	Report	Odemwingie 38'; Crouch 44'	Stadium: St Mary's Stadium; Attendance: 27,987; Referee: Craig Pawson

11 February 2014 26	Hull City	0–1	Southampton	Kingston upon Hull
19:45 GMT		Report	Fonte 69'	Stadium: KC Stadium; Attendance: 23,670; Referee: Martin Atkinson

22 February 2014 27	West Ham United	3–1	Southampton	London
15:00 GMT	Jarvis 20'; C. Cole 23'; Nolan 71'	Report	Yoshida 8'	Stadium: Boleyn Ground; Attendance: 33,148; Referee: Mark Clattenburg

1 March 2014 28	Southampton	0–3	Liverpool	Southampton
17:30 GMT		Report	Suárez 16'; Sterling 58'; Gerrard 90+5' (pen.)	Stadium: St Mary's Stadium; Attendance: 31,659; Referee: Lee Probert

8 March 2014 29	Crystal Palace	0–1	Southampton	London
15:00 GMT		Report	Rodriguez 37'	Stadium: Selhurst Park; Attendance: 25,073; Referee: Howard Webb

15 March 2014 30	Southampton	4–2	Norwich	Southampton
15:00 GMT (UTC)	Schneiderlin 5'; Lambert 57'; Rodriguez 72'; Gallagher 90'	Report	Elmander 85'; Snodgrass 86'	Stadium: St Mary's Stadium; Attendance: 29,828; Referee: Kevin Friend

22 March 2014 31	Tottenham Hotspur	3–2	Southampton	London
15:00 GMT	Eriksen 31', 46'; Sigurðsson 90'	Report	Rodriguez 19'; Lallana 28'	Stadium: White Hart Lane; Attendance: 35,460; Referee: Anthony Taylor

29 March 2014 32	Southampton	4–0	Newcastle United	Southampton
15:00 GMT	Rodriguez 45', 89'; Lambert 49'; Lallana 70'	Report		Stadium: St Mary's Stadium; Attendance: 31,360; Referee: Andre Marriner

5 April 2014 33	Manchester City	4–1	Southampton	Manchester
12:45 GMT	Touré 3'; Nasri 45'; Džeko 45'; Jovetić 81'	Report	Lambert 37' (pen.)	Stadium: City of Manchester Stadium; Attendance: 47,009; Referee: Chris Foy

12 April 2014 34	Southampton	0–1	Cardiff	Southampton
15:00 GMT		Report	Cala 65'	Stadium: St Mary's Stadium; Attendance: 30,526; Referee: Jonathan Moss

19 April 2014 35	Aston Villa	0–0	Southampton	Birmingham
15:00 GMT		Report		Stadium: Villa Park; Attendance: 35,134; Referee: Lee Mason

26 April 2014 36	Southampton	2–0	Everton	Southampton
15:00 GMT	Alcaraz 1' (o.g.); Coleman 31' (o.g.)	Report		Stadium: St Mary's Stadium; Attendance: 31,313; Referee: Michael Oliver

3 May 2014 37	Swansea City	0–1	Southampton	Swansea
15:00 GMT		Report	Lambert 90'	Stadium: Liberty Stadium; Attendance: 20,682; Referee: Anthony Taylor

11 May 2014 38	Southampton	1–1	Manchester United	Southampton
15:00 GMT	Lambert 28'	Report	Mata 54'	Attendance: 31,372; Referee: Mike Dean

Matchday	1	2	3	4	5	6	7	8	9	10	11	12	13	14	15	16	17	18	19	20	21	22	23	24	25	26	27	28	29	30	31	32	33	34	35	36	37	38
Ground	A	H	A	H	A	H	H	A	H	A	H	A	A	H	H	A	H	A	A	H	H	A	H	A	H	A	A	H	A	H	A	H	A	H	A	H	A	H
Result	W	D	L	D	W	W	W	D	W	D	W	L	L	L	D	D	L	W	L	L	W	D	D	W	D	W	L	L	W	W	L	W	L	L	D	W	W	D
Position	4	4	9	11	6	4	4	5	3	5	3	4	7	8	8	8	9	9	9	9	9	9	9	9	9	8	8	9	9	8	9	8	8	8	8	8	8	8

Updated to match(es) played on 26 April 2014. Source: statto.com
A = Away; H = Home; W = Win; D = Draw; L = Loss

Pos	Team	Pld	W	D	L	GF	GA	GD	Pts	Qualification or relegation
6	Tottenham Hotspur	38	21	6	11	55	51	+4	69	Qualification for the Europa League play-off round (Note: Since the winners of 2013–14 Football League Cup (Manchester City) qualified for the Champions League, the spot awarded to them (Europa League play-off round) was passed to the 6th-placed team.)
7	Manchester United	38	19	7	12	64	43	+21	64	
8	Southampton	38	15	11	12	54	46	+8	56	
9	Stoke City	38	13	11	14	45	52	−7	50	
10	Newcastle United	38	15	4	19	43	59	−16	49	

Source: Barclays Premier League
Rules for classification: 1) Points; 2) Goal difference; 3) Goals scored; 4) Play-offs (only if needed to decide champion, teams for relegation or teams for UEFA competitions).

== FA Cup ==
Burnley (4 January 2014)

As a Premier League club, Southampton started the 2013–14 FA Cup in the third round, facing Championship side Burnley on 4 January 2014. The visitors started the game quickly and almost broke the deadlock early, as Scott Arfield curled a shot narrowly wide of goal within minutes of kick-off. The Saints quickly began to get back into the game though, with attacking moves coming from Gastón Ramírez, Nathaniel Clyne and Luke Shaw, while Burnley strikers Danny Ings and Sam Vokes challenged at the other end; it was the hosts who broke the deadlock though, as Clyne picked up a pass and took a shot from around 25 yards out, which curled into the top corner of Burnley's goal for 1–0. The game was quickly in the hands of the Premier League side, as Rickie Lambert made it two within six minutes of the opener when he converted a pass from Steven Davis to double Southampton's lead. An injury to Lambert saw former Burnley striker Jay Rodriguez replace him after just 35 minutes, and the Saints saw out the remainder of the first half on the attack, with Luke Shaw also coming close to scoring his first for the club just before the break.

Burnley came out after half-time the stronger side, and within six minutes of the restart had pulled a goal back through Sam Vokes, who headed in a cross from Danny Ings to make it 2–1. The visitors continued to pressure the Saints goal, with Rodriguez enjoying one chance in a period of high pressure, and the Clarets made it count in the 57th minute when Ings scored a goal of his own by beating the home defence and shooting across Kelvin Davis's goal into the far corner. Momentum for the Championship side continued, and they almost took the lead just minutes later through a Vokes second, but Davis performed well to deny the Welsh striker; Adam Lallana was brought on in place of Ramírez just before the hour mark, with the hosts struggling to get back into the game. Rodriguez continued to enjoy chances against his former club though, and in the 66th minute he finally scored as a James Ward-Prowse shot was saved and the rebound came to the striker on the edge of the penalty area for a simple conversion, marking his 10th goal of the season in all competitions. Taking advantage of the lead, the Saints finally secured the victory through substitute Lallana, who picked up the ball in the Burnley half and scored from 25 yards out to make it 4–2; Burnley did not give up though, and Kevin Long did score a third for the Clarets, but the Premier League club held on to progress to the fourth round after an exciting cup tie.

Yeovil Town (25 January 2014)

On 5 January, Southampton were drawn into the fourth round at home against Championship side Yeovil Town, in a tie played on 25 January. The Saints dominated the early exchanges, but the Championship side held their own against the higher opposition, enjoying a number of early chances to score. Jay Rodriguez came close to breaking the deadlock early on, first seeing a shot from the edge of the area saved and then heading onto the crossbar from a Nathaniel Clyne cross. The hosts were awarded a penalty in the 22nd minute though, and the returning Guly do Prado converted the spot kick to put the Saints one up. Yeovil continued to play confidently, and the second half started with just one goal still in the match; young striker Sam Gallagher replaced do Prado in the 55th minute, and it was his first senior goal which put the Premier League side two up in the 70th minute. Gallagher almost made it two for him and three for the Saints later on, but it ended 2–0 and Southampton advanced to the fifth round.

Sunderland (15 February 2014)

On 15 February, the Saints travelled to face fellow Premier League side Sunderland, who had previously knocked them out of the League Cup just months before. Both teams named significantly changed sides from their previous league fixtures, and it took until the tenth minute for the first chance to fall to Southampton, with a well-executed move ending in a setup for James Ward-Prowse by Rickie Lambert which was taken comfortably by the Sunderland goalkeeper. The visitors continued to place the pressure on Sunderland, but they grew into the game quickly and started threatening attacks of their own to take control of the game. It was the hosts who broke the deadlock, too, shortly after the half-time break, as Craig Gardner took a long-range shot which went in off the underside of the crossbar to put the Black Cats ahead. The Saints soon brought on first-team mainstays Jay Rodriguez and Morgan Schneiderlin, but still struggled to find their way back into the tie; Connor Wickham also came on for the hosts, and provided a fresh, dangerous attacking option, almost scoring a second on a number of occasions. Southampton's best chance came late in the game, when a low cross from Nathaniel Clyne found Lambert unmarked in the six-yard area, but he scuffed the shot over the bar to leave the home side in front and progressing to the quarter-finals of the competition.

4 January 2014 Round 3	Southampton	4–3	Burnley	Southampton
15:00 GMT	Clyne 22'; Lambert 28'; Rodriguez 66'; Lallana 73'	Report	Vokes 51'; Ings 57'; Long 87'	Stadium: St Mary's Stadium; Attendance: 15,077; Referee: Robert Madley

25 January 2014 Round 4	Southampton	2–0	Yeovil Town	Southampton
15:00 GMT	Do Prado 23' (pen.); Gallagher 70'	Report		Stadium: St Mary's Stadium; Attendance: 24,070; Referee: Phil Dowd

15 February 2014 Round 5	Sunderland	1–0	Southampton	Sunderland
12:45 GMT	Gardner 49'	Report		Stadium: Stadium of Light; Attendance: 16,777; Referee: Mike Dean

== League Cup ==
Barnsley (27 August 2013)

Southampton began their 2013–14 League Cup campaign in the Second Round against struggling Championship side Barnsley on 27 August. The Saints could have opened the scoring in the first minute through Gastón Ramírez, who missed a chance from 12 yards out, but they did break the deadlock less than half an hour later through Steven Davis who scored in the penalty area. Barnsley came close to equalising close to the end of the first half, but shortly after the break it was Southampton who scored next through Jay Rodriguez, although this was soon to be cancelled out by Stephen Dawson for the home side. In the 66th minute, Emmanuel Mayuka scored his first goal for the club on only his third start for the club in a year, and later in the game debuts were given to winger Omar Rowe, midfielder Harrison Reed, and forward Jake Sinclair. Mayuka was later brought down in the box in the final minute of normal time, Steven Davis converted the penalty to give Saints the win, and Ramírez scored straight after to make it a 5–1 win for the Premier League side.

Bristol City (24 September 2013)

The draw for the Third Round took place the day after Southampton's win against Barnsley, pitting the Saints at home against recently relegated League One side Bristol City in a tie played on 24 September. The hosts started the game strongly, and opened the scoring through in the 15th minute when Gastón Ramírez volleyed in a blocked shot from James Ward-Prowse for 1–0. Both teams continued to push throughout the first half, with the visitors enjoying a number of chances of their own, while the returning Tadanari Lee for Southampton also had a number of efforts on goal. In the second half, Bristol City were arguably the stronger team, with Kelvin Davis being tested a number of times and the League One side almost equalising on numerous occasions; it took until the last ten minutes for the Premier League side to secure their lead, with Jos Hooiveld heading in for 2–0 in the 83rd minute.

Sunderland (29/30 October 2013)

Southampton were drawn against fellow Premier League side Sunderland at the Stadium of Light in the Fourth Round of the tournament, in a fixture scheduled for 6 November. Southampton dominated possession in the early stages of the game, but the home side also enjoyed chances through Jack Colback and Jozy Altidore throughout the first half. The home side dominated the possession in the early second-half exchanges, with Altidore almost opening the scoring within three minutes, and in the 59th minute they made the domination count as Phil Bardsley converted amongst a crowded penalty area to put the Black Cats one up. Southampton attempted to respond, with two penalty claims being turned down in quick succession, and four minutes from full-time Sunderland all but sealed the victory through Sebastian Larsson. Maya Yoshida did score for the Saints two minutes later, but the team could not find another goal and Sunderland advanced to the next round, putting an end to Southampton's cup run.

27 August 2013 Round 2	Barnsley	1–5	Southampton	Barnsley
19:45 BST	Dawson 53'	Report	Davis 26', 90' (pen.); Rodriguez 49'; Mayuka 66'; Ramírez 90+1'	Stadium: Oakwell; Attendance: 6,574; Referee: Scott Duncan

24 September 2013 Round 3	Southampton	2–0	Bristol City	Southampton
19:45 BST	Ramírez 15'; Hooiveld 83'	Report		Stadium: St Mary's Stadium; Attendance: 8,539; Referee: Graham Scott

6 November 2013 Round 4	Sunderland	2–1	Southampton	Sunderland
19:45 GMT	Bardsley 59'; Larsson 86'	Report	Yoshida 88'	Stadium: Stadium of Light; Attendance: 15,966; Referee: Lee Mason

== Squad statistics ==
No.	Pos.	Nat.	Name	League			FA Cup			League Cup			Total			Discipline	
No.	Pos.	Nat.	Name	Apps.	Gls.	Asst.	Apps.	Gls.	Asst.	Apps.	Gls.	Asst.	Apps.	Gls.	Asst.	Yellow card	Red card
1	GK	(England)	Kelvin Davis	2	0	0	3	0	0	3	0	0	8	0	0	0	0
2	DF	(England)	Nathaniel Clyne	20(5)	0	4	3	1	0	1	0	0	24(5)	1	4	4	0
3	DF	(Japan)	Maya Yoshida	7(1)	1	0	3	0	0	3	1	0	13(1)	2	0	1	0
4	MF	(France)	Morgan Schneiderlin	31(2)	2	1	2(1)	0	0	0	0	0	33(3)	2	1	8	0
5	DF	(Croatia)	Dejan Lovren	31	2	1	0	0	0	0	0	0	31	2	1	7	0
6	DF	(Portugal)	José Fonte	35(1)	3	0	0(1)	0	0	1	0	0	36(2)	3	0	6	0
7	FW	(England)	Rickie Lambert	31(6)	13	10	2	1	0	0	0	0	33(6)	14	10	2	0
8	MF	(Northern Ireland)	Steven Davis	28(6)	2	7	2(1)	0	2	3	2	1	33(7)	4	9	4	0
9	FW	(England)	Jay Rodriguez	30(3)	15	3	1(2)	1	0	2(1)	1	0	33(6)	17	3	3	0
10	MF	(Uruguay)	Gastón Ramírez	3(15)	1	3	1	0	0	3	2	1	7(15)	3	4	2	0
12	MF	(Kenya)	Victor Wanyama	19(4)	0	0	1	0	0	0	0	0	20(4)	0	0	6	0
16	MF	(England)	James Ward-Prowse	16(18)	0	2	3	0	0	1(1)	0	2	20(19)	0	4	3	0
18	MF	(England)	Jack Cork	21(7)	0	1	2	0	0	3	0	0	26(7)	0	1	5	0
20	MF	(England)	Adam Lallana	37(1)	9	6	2(1)	1	1	0(1)	0	0	39(3)	10	7	3	0
21	MF	(Brazil)	Guly do Prado	0(9)	0	0	2	1	0	1	0	0	3(9)	1	0	0	0
22	DF	(England)	Calum Chambers	18(4)	0	0	0	0	0	2	0	0	20(4)	0	0	0	0
23	DF	(England)	Luke Shaw	35	0	1	3	0	0	0	0	0	38	0	1	3	0
25	GK	(Argentina)	Paulo Gazzaniga	7(1)	0	0	0	0	0	0	0	0	7(1)	0	0	0	0
26	DF	(Netherlands)	Jos Hooiveld	3	0	0	3	0	0	2	1	1	8	1	1	3	0
31	GK	(Poland)	Artur Boruc	29	0	1	0	0	0	0	0	0	29	0	1	0	0
32	DF	(England)	Jason McCarthy	0	0	0	0	0	0	0	0	0	0	0	0	0	0
33	DF	(England)	Matt Targett	0	0	0	0	0	0	0	0	0	0	0	0	0	0
37	MF	(England)	Omar Rowe	0	0	0	0	0	0	0(2)	0	0	0(2)	0	0	0	0
38	MF	(England)	Harrison Reed	0(4)	0	0	0(1)	0	0	1(2)	0	0	1(7)	0	0	0	0
39	FW	(England)	Jake Sinclair	0	0	0	0	0	0	0(1)	0	0	0(1)	0	0	0	0
40	FW	(England)	Sam Gallagher	3(15)	1	0	0(1)	1	0	0(1)	0	0	3(17)	2	0	0	0
41	GK	(United States)	Cody Cropper	0	0	0	0	0	0	0	0	0	0	0	0	0	0
45	MF	(England)	Sam McQueen	0	0	0	0(1)	0	0	0	0	0	0(1)	0	0	0	0
Players with appearances who left the club before the end of the season or ended the season out on loan
13	DF	(Scotland)	Danny Fox	3	0	1	0	0	0	3	0	0	6	0	1	0	0
17	FW	(Italy)	Dani Osvaldo	9(4)	3	0	0	0	0	0	0	0	9(4)	3	0	2	0
19	FW	(Japan)	Tadanari Lee	0	0	0	0	0	0	2	0	0	2	0	0	0	0
24	FW	(Zambia)	Emmanuel Mayuka	0	0	0	0	0	0	1	1	0	1	1	0	0	0
27	MF	(Wales)	Lloyd Isgrove	0	0	0	0	0	0	1	0	0	1	0	0	0	0

=== Most appearances ===
	Pos.	Nat.	Name	League		FA Cup		League Cup		Total		
	Pos.	Nat.	Name	Strt.	Sub.	Strt.	Sub.	Strt.	Sub.	Strt.	Sub.	Total
1	MF	(England)	Adam Lallana	37	1	2	1	0	1	39	3	42
2	MF	(Northern Ireland)	Steven Davis	28	6	2	1	3	0	33	7	40
3	FW	(England)	Rickie Lambert	31	6	2	0	0	0	33	6	39
3	FW	(England)	Jay Rodriguez	30	3	1	2	2	1	33	6	39
3	MF	(England)	James Ward-Prowse	16	18	3	0	1	1	20	19	39
5	DF	(England)	Luke Shaw	35	0	3	0	0	0	38	0	38
5	DF	(Portugal)	José Fonte	35	1	0	1	1	0	36	2	38
8	MF	(France)	Morgan Schneiderlin	31	2	2	1	0	0	33	3	36
9	MF	(England)	Jack Cork	21	7	2	0	3	0	26	7	33
10	DF	(Croatia)	Dejan Lovren	31	0	0	0	0	0	31	0	31

=== Top goalscorers ===
	Pos.	Nat.	Name	League		FA Cup		League Cup		Total		
	Pos.	Nat.	Name	Gls.	Apps.	Gls.	Apps.	Gls.	Apps.	Gls.	Apps.	GPG
1	FW	(England)	Jay Rodriguez	15	33	1	3	1	3	17	39	0.44
2	FW	(England)	Rickie Lambert	13	37	1	2	0	0	14	39	0.35
3	MF	(England)	Adam Lallana	9	38	1	3	0	1	10	42	0.23
4	MF	(Northern Ireland)	Steven Davis	2	34	0	3	2	3	4	40	0.10
5	FW	(Italy)	Dani Osvaldo	3	13	0	0	0	0	3	13	0.23
5	MF	(Uruguay)	Gastón Ramírez	1	18	0	1	2	3	3	22	0.13
5	DF	(Portugal)	José Fonte	3	36	0	1	0	1	3	38	0.07
8	DF	(Japan)	Maya Yoshida	1	8	0	3	1	3	2	14	0.14
8	FW	(England)	Sam Gallagher	1	18	1	1	0	1	2	20	0.10
8	DF	(Croatia)	Dejan Lovren	2	31	0	0	0	0	2	31	0.06
8	MF	(France)	Morgan Schneiderlin	2	33	0	3	0	0	2	36	0.05

=== Top assistants ===
	Pos.	Nat.	Name	League		FA Cup		League Cup		Total		
	Pos.	Nat.	Name	Asst.	Apps.	Asst.	Apps.	Asst.	Apps.	Asst.	Apps.	APG
1	FW	(England)	Rickie Lambert	10	37	0	2	0	0	10	39	0.25
2	MF	(Northern Ireland)	Steven Davis	7	34	2	3	1	3	10	39	0.25
3	MF	(England)	Adam Lallana	6	38	1	3	0	1	7	42	0.16
4	MF	(England)	James Ward-Prowse	3	34	0	3	2	2	5	39	0.12
5	MF	(Uruguay)	Gastón Ramírez	3	19	0	1	1	3	4	22	0.18
5	DF	(England)	Nathaniel Clyne	4	25	0	3	0	1	4	29	0.13
7	FW	(England)	Jay Rodriguez	3	33	0	3	0	3	3	39	0.08
8	DF	(Scotland)	Danny Fox	1	3	0	0	0	3	1	6	0.16
8	DF	(Netherlands)	Jos Hooiveld	0	3	0	3	1	2	1	8	0.12
8	GK	(Poland)	Artur Boruc	1	29	0	0	0	0	1	29	0.03
8	DF	(Croatia)	Dejan Lovren	1	31	0	0	0	0	1	31	0.02
8	MF	(England)	Jack Cork	1	28	0	2	0	3	1	33	0.02
8	MF	(France)	Morgan Schneiderlin	1	33	0	3	0	0	1	36	0.02
8	DF	(England)	Luke Shaw	1	35	0	3	0	0	1	38	0.02

== Transfers ==
Players transferred in
Date	Pos.	Name	Club	Fee	Ref.
14 June 2013	DF	(Croatia) Dejan Lovren	(France) Lyon	£8.5 million	
11 July 2013	MF	(Kenya) Victor Wanyama	(Scotland) Celtic	£12.5 million	
18 August 2013	FW	(Italy) Dani Osvaldo	(Italy) Roma	£15 million	
Players transferred out
Date	Pos.	Name	Club	Fee	Ref.
11 July 2013	DF	(Norway) Vegard Forren	(Norway) Molde	Undisclosed	
30 August 2013	MF	(England) Dean Hammond	(England) Leicester City	Undisclosed	
31 January 2014	MF	(England) Jason Puncheon	(England) Crystal Palace	£1.75 million	
8 May 2014	DF	(Scotland) Danny Fox	(England) Nottingham Forest	Free	
Players loaned out
Start date	Pos.	Name	Club	End date	Ref.
21 August 2013	MF	(England) Jason Puncheon	(England) Crystal Palace	31 January 2014	
2 September 2013	FW	(Zambia) Emmanuel Mayuka	(France) Sochaux	End of season	
26 September 2013	FW	(England) Billy Sharp	(England) Reading	31 December 2013	
22 January 2014	FW	(England) Billy Sharp	(England) Doncaster Rovers	End of season	
24 January 2014	FW	(England) Lee Barnard	(England) Southend United	End of season	
30 January 2014	DF	(Scotland) Danny Fox	(England) Nottingham Forest	End of season	
31 January 2014	FW	(Italy) Dani Osvaldo	(Italy) Juventus	End of season	
13 March 2014	DF	(England) Jack Stephens	(England) Swindon Town	End of season	
13 March 2014	MF	(Wales) Lloyd Isgrove	(England) Peterborough United	End of season	
Players released
Date	Pos.	Name	Subsequent club	Join date	Ref.
30 June 2013	FW	(England) Sam Hoskins	(England) Yeovil Town	1 July 2013	
30 June 2013	MF	(England) Ben Reeves	(England) Milton Keynes Dons	13 July 2013	
30 June 2013	DF	(England) Danny Seaborne	(England) Yeovil Town	19 July 2013	
30 June 2013	DF	(England) Ryan Dickson	(England) Colchester United	26 July 2013	
30 June 2013	DF	(England) Frazer Richardson	(England) Middlesbrough	2 August 2013	
30 June 2013	GK	(England) Tommy Forecast	(England) Chelmsford City	10 August 2013	
30 June 2013	DF	(England) Danny Butterfield	(England) Carlisle United	23 August 2013	
30 June 2013	FW	(Portugal) Alberto Seidi	(England) Workington	5 December 2013	
30 June 2013	MF	(United States) Gboly Ariyibi	(England) Leeds United	11 December 2013	
11 July 2013	MF	(England) Richard Chaplow	(England) Millwall	17 July 2013	
1 August 2013	MF	(Belgium) Steve De Ridder	(Netherlands) FC Utrecht	1 August 2013	
14 January 2014	FW	(Japan) Tadanari Lee	(Japan) Urawa Red Diamonds	16 January 2014	
28 January 2014	DF	(England) Aaron Martin	(England) Birmingham City	30 January 2014	
