= Hertford and District Football League =

Association football league in England

- Founded: 1910
- Folded: 2025
- Country: England
- Divisions: 3
- Number of clubs: 32
- Feeder to: Hertfordshire Senior County League Division One

The Hertford and District Football League was a football competition based around the town of Hertford, Hertfordshire in England founded in 1910 as a Junior league and was first won by Amwell Juniors. A second division was added for the 1922–23 season. Resuming after World War II in 1948 it had a Premier Division and Division One and Two and for most of its existence from the late 1970s had four divisions. However, with the Hertfordshire Senior County League expanding after COVID-19 from 2022, most of the Hertford & District teams were absorbed which left only a Veterans Division that continued for three years before the league folded in 2025. It was a feeder to the Hertfordshire Senior County League and clubs progressing to higher levels included Wormley Rovers, Westmill, Allenburys Sports and Hertford Heath.

Hertford Heath were the most successful club winning the top division title on 19 occasions and the Hertfordshire Junior Cup twice. Bengeo Trinity won the title 17 times with 3 Herts Junior Cups and Haileybury Club, a Hoddesdon based side, won the Premier Division 9 times and the Herts Junior Cup 6 times. Westmill were next with 8 titles and 2 Herts Junior Cup victories. Hertford Heath and Haileybury Club were the dominant sides between 1967 and 1986 winning the Premier Division 18 times out of 20, only Westmill twice interfered with that run of success.

McMullen's, the local Hertford brewery, were sponsors of the league for 27 years and it was known as the "Macs League", finally ending their association in 2005.

Clubs were affiliated to several county Football Associations including Hertfordshire FA, Essex FA, Bedfordshire FA and the London FA.

== Recent divisional champions ==
Season	Premier Division	Division One	Division Two	Division Three	Division Four
2002–03	Hertford Heath	Wodson Park	Elizabeth Allen Old Boys	Ware Lions	
2003–04	Hertford Heath	Elizabeth Allen Old Boys	Westmill reserves	Wodson Park "A"	
2004–05	Bengeo Trinity	Greenbury United	Thundridge United	John Warner Reserves	
2005–06	Bengeo Trinity	Waltham Abbey "A"	Ware Lions	Baldock Cannon	
2006–07	Harlow Link	Ware Lions	Baldock Cannon	Royston Town "A"	
2007–08	Bengeo Trinity	Baldock Cannon	County Hall Rangers	Heath Juniors	
2008–09	Westmill	Broxbourne Badgers	Oracle Components	Not held	
2009–10	Bengeo Trinity	Saracens	White Lion	Ware Lions Re-United	
2010–11	Greenbury United	Waltham Abbey "B"	Nazeing	Mangrove Reserves	
2011–12	Bengeo Trinity	Waltham Abbey "B"	Mangrove	Watton-at-Stone	
2012–13	Greenbury United	Ware Lions Re-United	Allenburys	Cottered Reserves	
2013–14	Bengeo Trinity	FC Cornerstone	Ware Lions Old Boys	Buntingford Cougars	
2014–15	Oracle Components	Lions	Nazeing	Old Hertfordshire Athletic	
2015–16	Broxbourne Badgers	Waltham Abbey "A"	Mangrove	55 FC	
2016–17	Waltham Abbey "A"	Mill Lane	Wheathampstead Wanderers	Much Hadham	Hertford Heath
2017–18	Waltham Abbey "A"	St Ippolyts Oneness FC	St Johns FC	Not held	
2018–19	Waltham Abbey "A"	Hertford Heath First	Wormley Rovers Vets	MKS Carpentry First	
2019–20	Leagues weren't completed due to the COVID-19 pandemic in the United Kingdom				
2020–21	Westmill First	Sheering First	Waltham Abbey "A"	Not held	

Season	Beane	Lea
2021–22	Allenburys Sports First	Buffs FC Saturday First

Season	Premier League	Division One	Vets Division
2022–23	Elizabeth Allen Old Boys First	Moreton First	Tansley Saturday Veterans
2023–24	Not held	Not held	Tansley Saturday Veterans
2024-25	Not held	Not held	Boca Seniors

== Member clubs 2019-20 ==
=== Premier Division ===
- Allenbury's Sports First
- Bocas Jogabonito First
- Broxbourne Badgers First
- Highlands FC (Middx) First
- Inter Hoddesdon First
- Lions FC First
- Mill Lane FC First
- North Weald Athletic First
- Waltham Abbey A
- Westmill First

=== Division One ===
- Albury First
- Bengeo Trinity Reserves
- Letchworth FC First
- MKS Carpentry First
- Nazeing First
- Sheering First
- Stotfold Junior Town (Sat)
- Thundridge United (HDL) First
- Ware Trinity First
- Watton-at-Stone First
- Wormley Rovers Veterans

=== Division Two ===
- Buffs FC (Saturday) First
- Bullys Crusaders Saturday
- Buntingford Wanderers FC First
- Elizabeth Allen Old Boys First
- Greenbury United First
- Hertford Heath First
- Mangrove First
- Much Hadham First
- Stotfold Junior Town Reserves (Sat)
- Waltham Abbey B
