= 2015–16 Spartan South Midlands Football League =

The 2015–16 Spartan South Midlands Football League season was the 19th in the history of Spartan South Midlands Football League a football competition in England.

== Premier Division ==
Spartan South Midlands Football League Premier Division
- Season: 2015–16
- Champions: AFC Dunstable
- Promoted: AFC Dunstable
- Relegated: Harefield United; Bedford
- Matches: 462
- Goals: 1,638 (3.55 per match)

The Premier Division featured 19 clubs which competed in the division last season, along with three clubs promoted from Division One:

- Bedford
- Broxbourne Borough
- Welwyn Garden City

Five clubs have applied for promotion to Step 4: AFC Dunstable, Berkhamsted, Hertford Town, Hoddesdon Town and London Colney.

=== League table ===
Pos	Team	Pld	W	D	L	GF	GA	GD	Pts	Promotion or relegation
1	AFC Dunstable	42	32	6	4	118	33	+85	102	Promoted to the Southern Football League
2	London Colney	42	27	8	7	93	37	+56	89	
3	Hoddesdon Town	42	27	8	7	82	36	+46	89	
4	Welwyn Garden City	42	22	8	12	88	49	+39	74	
5	Berkhamsted	42	22	8	12	93	63	+30	74	
6	Hadley	42	22	5	15	82	55	+27	71	
7	Holmer Green	42	22	4	16	86	82	+4	70	
8	Hertford Town	42	20	8	14	112	82	+30	68	
9	Cockfosters	42	18	13	11	82	62	+20	67	
10	Biggleswade United	42	20	7	15	64	54	+10	67	
11	Wembley	42	19	6	17	77	61	+16	63	
12	Tring Athletic	42	17	12	13	66	56	+10	63	
13	London Tigers	42	17	9	16	64	75	−11	60	
14	Sun Sports	42	16	7	19	76	83	−7	55	
15	Stotfold	42	14	9	19	68	83	−15	51	
16	Broxbourne Borough	42	11	8	23	58	96	−38	41	
17	Oxhey Jets	42	11	3	28	59	128	−69	36	
18	Leverstock Green	42	9	8	25	76	107	−31	35	
19	St Margaretsbury	42	8	9	25	56	96	−40	33	
20	Colney Heath	42	9	6	27	38	87	−49	33	
21	Harefield United	42	9	4	29	42	106	−64	31	Relegated to Division One
22	Bedford	42	9	6	27	58	107	−49	30 (Note: Bedford were deducted 3 points.)	Relegated to Division One

Source: fchd
Rules for classification: 1) points; 2) goal difference; 3) number of goals scored.

== Division One ==
Spartan South Midlands Football League Division One
- Season: 2015–16
- Champions: Edgware Town
- Promoted: Edgware Town; Crawley Green
- Matches: 380
- Goals: 1,381 (3.63 per match)

Division One featured 20 clubs in the division for this season, of which there are five new clubs.

- Two clubs relegated from Premier Division:
  - Ampthill Town
  - Hillingdon Borough
- Two clubs promoted from Division Two:
  - Brimsdown
  - New Bradwell St. Peter
- Plus:
  - Broadfields United, promoted from Middlesex County League Premier Division

In addition, Bush Hill Rangers changed their name to Woodford Town.

=== League table ===
Pos	Team	Pld	W	D	L	GF	GA	GD	Pts	Promotion or relegation
1	Edgware Town	38	30	6	2	130	45	+85	96	Promoted to the Premier Division
2	Crawley Green	38	27	5	6	83	41	+42	86	Promoted to the Premier Division
3	Baldock Town	38	26	4	8	93	41	+52	82	
4	Harpenden Town	38	22	5	11	87	50	+37	71	
5	Chesham United Reserves	38	21	5	12	77	55	+22	65 (Note: Chesham United Reserves were deducted 3 points for fielding an ineligible player in their game against Southall on 15 August.)	
6	Wodson Park	38	19	5	14	79	59	+20	62	
7	Risborough Rangers	38	18	8	12	68	60	+8	62	
8	Buckingham Athletic	38	16	10	12	57	44	+13	58	
9	New Bradwell St Peter	38	17	7	14	62	66	−4	58	Demoted to Division Two
10	Codicote	38	17	3	18	61	73	−12	54	
11	Broadfields United	38	14	7	17	74	81	−7	49	
12	Southall	38	13	8	17	68	77	−9	47	
13	Woodford Town	38	13	5	20	71	67	+4	44	Resigned from the league
14	Ampthill Town	38	14	2	22	60	77	−17	44	
15	Brimsdown	38	12	7	19	62	93	−31	42 (Note: Brimsdown were deducted 1 point for fielding an ineligible player in their game against Hillingdon Borough on 12 December.)	
16	Hillingdon Borough	38	11	6	21	56	83	−27	39	
17	Hatfield Town	38	10	7	21	49	70	−21	37	
18	Langford	38	9	9	20	62	97	−35	36	
19	Winslow United	38	9	7	22	51	82	−31	34	
20	Arlesey Town Reserves	38	2	4	32	31	120	−89	10	

Source: fchd
Rules for classification: 1) points; 2) goal difference; 3) number of goals scored.

== Division Two ==
Spartan South Midlands Football League Division Two
- Season: 2015–16
- Champions: Kent Athletic
- Promoted: AFC Hillgate
- Matches: 240
- Goals: 1,072 (4.47 per match)

Division Two featured twelve clubs which competed in the division last season, along with six new clubs:

- AFC Hillgate, joined from the Middlesex County League
- Amersham Town, relegated from Division One
- Aylesbury reserves
- Loughton Manor, joined from the North Bucks & District League
- St Albans City reserves
- Stony Stratford Town, relegated from Division One

=== League table ===
Pos	Team	Pld	W	D	L	GF	GA	GD	Pts	Promotion
1	Kent Athletic	30	27	1	2	138	37	+101	82	Resigned from the league
2	Hale Leys United	30	24	4	2	124	34	+90	76	Resigned from the league
3	Old Bradwell United	30	24	1	5	79	36	+43	73	
4	Pitstone & Ivinghoe United	30	18	4	8	98	66	+32	58	
5	AFC Hillgate	30	17	2	11	68	47	+21	53	Promoted to Division One
6	Loughton Manor	30	14	5	11	62	56	+6	47	
7	Aston Clinton	30	13	5	12	65	61	+4	44	
8	Totternhoe	30	12	6	12	65	64	+1	42	
9	Tring Corinthians	30	10	5	15	52	50	+2	35	
10	Stony Stratford Town	30	11	4	15	60	64	−4	34 (Note: Stony Stratford Town were deducted 3 points.)	Resigned from the league
11	Mursley United	30	10	3	17	47	83	−36	33	
12	Amersham Town	30	9	4	17	57	81	−24	31	
13	Wolverton Town	30	8	6	16	49	79	−30	30	
14	Grendon Rangers	30	4	5	21	33	102	−69	17	
15	Clean Slate	30	4	3	23	45	121	−76	15	
16	The 61	30	2	8	20	30	91	−61	14	
17	Aylesbury reserves	0	0	0	0	0	0	0	0	Clubs folded, records expunged
18	St Albans City reserves	0	0	0	0	0	0	0	0	Clubs folded, records expunged

Source: fchd
Rules for classification: 1) points; 2) goal difference; 3) number of goals scored.
