= Bush Hill Rangers F.C. =

Association football club in England

Bush Hill Rangers FC
- Full name: Bush Hill Rangers FC
- Nickname: The Rangers
- Short name: Bush Hill
- Founded: 2007 (as Goffs Oak); 2018 (re-formed)
- Dissolved: 2024
- Ground: Theobald’s Lane Stadium, Cheshunt
- Capacity: 150
- Chairman: Soner Mustafa
- League: Herts Senior County League - Premier Division
Home colours	Away colours

Bush Hill Rangers FC were a football club from Enfield, who last played in the Herts Senior County League - Premier Division.

== History ==
Goffs Oak F.C. were founded in 2007 and started competing in the Premier Division of the Hertford and District Football League, finishing second in the 2007–08 season. In 2010, they won promotion to the Herts Senior County League, winning Division One at their first attempt. Promotion to the Premier Division saw them move to Goldsdown Road in Brimsdown.

Bush Hill Rangers F.C. were founded as an under-12s team by Soner Mustafa in 2003. The club grew to incorporate youth teams for a number of age groups. By 2011, the club's under-18s side were looking to progress onto adult football, and came to an agreement with Goffs Oak to become their reserve side, winning the Herts Senior Reserve League in their first season.

In June 2012, Goffs Oak and Bush Hill Rangers merged into one club, with the club taking the latter's name and remaining in the Herts Senior County League. In their first season, they competed in the FA Vase for the first time, losing to Cranfield United after a replay.

In 2014, an application to join the Spartan South Midlands League was successful. The club competed in Division One, the 10th tier of English football, in the 2014–15 season.

Due to various reasons, in 2015, the club merged with Woodford Town Junior Football Club and was renamed Woodford Town F.C. The new club wanted to be considered a continuation of Woodford Town F.C. (1937), who existed between 1937 and 2003. They continued playing in the SSML Division One, but issues with the pitch at Goldsdown Road forced the club to sit out the 2016–17 season and consequently leave the SSML. Another iteration of Woodford Town emerged in 2017, as the former Haringey & Waltham changed their name.

Soner Mustafa wanted to reform Bush Hill Rangers FC and was successful as they joined the Herts Senior County League in 2018 winning Division One in their first season. They now play in the Premier Division with the aspirations of regaining their place in the SSML. In June 2024 Bush Hill Rangers were dissolved following the 2023/24 season.

== Honours ==
- Hertfordshire Senior County League Division One:
  - Winners (2): 2010–11, 2018–19
- Hertford and District Football League Premier Division:
  - Runners-up (1): 2007–08
- Hertford and District Football League Premier Division Cup:
  - Runners-up (1): 2007–08
- Middlesex County Football Association Intermediate Cup
  - Runners-up (1): 2011–12
- Middlesex County Football Association Senior Premier Cup'
  - Winners (1): 2014–2015

== Records ==
- Highest League Position: 11th in Spartan South Midlands League Division One 2014–15
- FA Vase best performance: First qualifying round 2012–13
