= Sherborn =

Sherborn is a surname, and may refer to:

- Charles Davies Sherborn (1861–1942), British bibliographer, paleontologist and geologist
- Charles William Sherborn (1831–1912), British engraver
- Derek Sherborn (1924–2004), British cultural conservationist
- Richard Sherborn, 16th century English politician

== See also ==
- Sherborn, Massachusetts, United States
- Sherborne (disambiguation)
- Sherbourne (disambiguation)
