= Charles Sherborn =

Charles Sherborn may refer to:

- Charles Davies Sherborn (1861–1942), English bibliographer, paleontologist and geologist
- Charles William Sherborn (1831–1916), English engraver
