= Sherborne (disambiguation) =

Sherborne may refer to

Places

- Sherborne, a town in Dorset, England
- Sherborne, Gloucestershire, England
- Sherborne St John, Hampshire, England
- Sherborne, a hamlet within the parish of Litton, Somerset, England

People

- Andrew Sherborne (b.1961), English golfer
- Robert Sherborne (d.1536), English bishop
- Baron Sherborne, an extinct title in the British peerage

Other

- Sherborne School, Dorset, England
- Sherborne Sensors, a British manufacturer of precision measurement tools
- HMS Sherborne (1763), a British naval ship

== See also ==
- Sherborne House (disambiguation)
- Sherbourne (disambiguation)
- Sherborn (disambiguation)
