= Biodiversity Heritage Library =

Discipline-oriented digital libraries

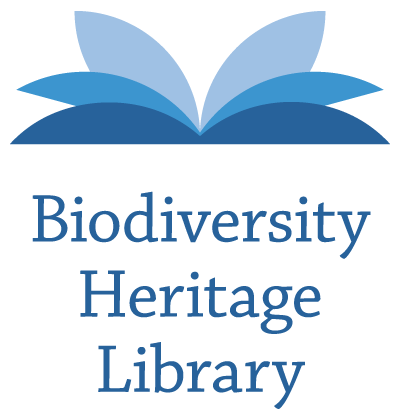
- Logo
- Producer: Biodiversity Heritage Library consortium (United States)
- History: 2006–present
- Languages: English

Access
- Cost: Free

Coverage
- Disciplines: biodiversity
- Record depth: Index and full-text
- Format coverage: Books; Journal; Trade and magazine articles; Newsletters
- Geospatial coverage: Worldwide

Links
- Website: biodiversitylibrary.org

The Biodiversity Heritage Library (BHL) is the world’s largest open-access digital library for biodiversity literature and archives. BHL operates as a worldwide consortium of natural history, botanical, research, and national libraries working together to address this challenge by digitizing the natural history literature held in their collections and making it freely available for open access as part of a global "biodiversity community". The BHL consortium works with the international taxonomic community, publishers, bioinformaticians, and information technology professionals to develop tools and services to facilitate greater access, interoperability, and reuse of content and data. BHL provides a range of services, data exports, and APIs to allow users to download content, harvest source data files, and reuse materials for research purposes. Through taxonomic intelligence tools developed by Global Names Architecture, BHL indexes the taxonomic names throughout the collection, allowing researchers to locate publications about specific taxa. In partnership with the Internet Archive and through local digitization efforts, BHL's portal provides free access to hundreds of thousands of volumes, comprising over 59 million pages, from the 15th–21st centuries.

Founded in 2006, BHL soon became the third broad digitization project for biodiversity literature, after Gallica and AnimalBase. In 2008, the size of Gallica and AnimalBase was passed, and BHL is now by far the world's largest digitization project for biodiversity literature.

It was the literature cornerstone of the Encyclopedia of Life.

== Composition ==
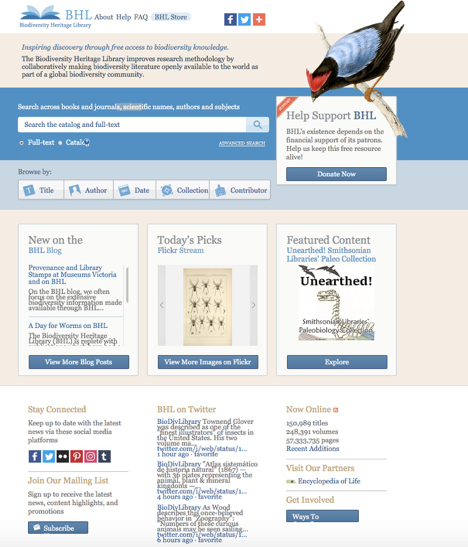
The Biodiversity Heritage Library website

Data Flows for the Biodiversity Heritage Library

Initially, the Biodiversity Heritage Library was a collaboration of ten natural history and botanical libraries and currently it has fourteen members. The founding member libraries are:

- American Museum of Natural History (New York, New York)
- Field Museum of Natural History (Chicago, Illinois)
- Botany Libraries (Harvard University Herbaria) (Cambridge, Massachusetts)
- Ernst Mayr Library (Museum of Comparative Zoology) (Cambridge, Massachusetts)
- Marine Biological Laboratory of Woods Hole Oceanographic Institution (Woods Hole, Massachusetts)
- Missouri Botanical Garden (St. Louis, Missouri)
- Natural History Museum (London, England)
- The New York Botanical Garden (Bronx, New York)
- Royal Botanic Gardens, Kew (Richmond, United Kingdom)
- Smithsonian Institution (Washington D.C.)

In May 2009, two new members were added to the consortium:

- Academy of Natural Sciences (Philadelphia, Pennsylvania)
- California Academy of Sciences (San Francisco, California)

In November 2011, two new members were added to the consortium:

- Cornell University Library (Ithaca, New York)
- United States Geological Survey (Reston, Virginia)

In February 2013, one new member was added to the consortium:

- Library of Congress (Washington D.C.)

Since 2009, the BHL has expanded globally. The European Commission's eContentPlus program has funded the as Biodiversity Heritage Library for Europe. The BHL Europe project consisted of 28 consortium partners, mostly European libraries. The project closed in 2012, but many participating institutions remain active as BHL partners.

Shortly thereafter another project BHL-China was launched in Beijing, in collaboration with the Chinese Academy of Sciences. Since then BHL in the strict sense has been called BHL-US/UK (usually only BHL-US), the global project has been referred to as BHL-Global, to distinguish it from the US/UK project. The global BHL project is managed primarily by the Smithsonian Institution (Washington, D.C.), Natural History Museum (London), and Missouri Botanical Garden. Six regional centers are planned.

In 2010, the Atlas of Living Australia created a regional node for Australia. The digitisation operation is hosted by Museums Victoria and is nationally funded by the ALA. Australia's museums, herbaria, royal societies, field naturalist clubs and government organisations make up the contributors. Additionally, Brazil (through SciELO), and the Bibliotheca Alexandrina have also created regional BHL nodes. These projects will work together to share content, protocols, services, and digital preservation practices.

There is an online BHL portal featuring Google Maps API integration, AJAX, tag clouds, and JPEG2000 images that facilitate multi-resolution zoom and pan.

== Governance ==
The Biodiversity Heritage Library is managed by a Secretariat headquartered at Smithsonian Libraries and Archives in Washington, DC. An Executive Committee, elected by Biodiversity Heritage Library Members, provides strategic direction. The Secretariat is led by the BHL Program Director. Thomas Garnett served in that position (2006–2012) and was succeeded by Martin R. Kalfatovic (April 1, 2012–June 30, 2024). Kelli Trei (Biosciences Librarian and Associate Professor from the University of Illinois Urbana-Champaign) was appointed Transition Director in May 2025.

On April 22, 2025, David Iggulden, Chair of BHL's Executive Committee (EC), announced that on ″January 1, 2026, the Smithsonian will no longer host the administrative functions of BHL.″

== Awards ==
The Biodiversity Heritage Library was awarded the 2010 John Thackray Medal of the Society for the History of Natural History. This award "recognizes significant achievements in the history or bibliography of natural history".

In March 2012, the Missouri Botanical Garden received $260,000 in funding from the National Endowment for the Humanities to identify and describe natural history illustrations from the digitized books and journals in the online Biodiversity Heritage Library. The Art of Life project will develop software tools for automated identification and description of visual resources contained within the more than 100,000 volumes and 38 million pages of core historic literature made available through BHL digitization activities.

IDG's Computerworld Honors Program announced on March 19, 2013 the Biodiversity Heritage Library as a 2013 laureate. The annual award program honors visionary applications of information technology promoting positive social, economic, and educational change.

In May 2013, the Biodiversity Heritage Library was the recipient of the Charles Robert Long Award of Extraordinary Merit from the Council on Botanical and Horticultural Libraries. The award is the highest honor bestowed by the council, honoring outstanding contributions and meritorious service to the field of botanical and horticultural literature, with only 14 recipients named since 1988.

In October 2015, the Biodiversity Heritage Library was awarded the Internet Archive’s Internet Heroes at the 2015 Library Leaders’ Forum in San Francisco, 21–23 October 2015.

The Digital Library Federation named the Biodiversity Heritage Library a joint winner (along with the American Archive of Public Broadcasting) of the DLF 2016 Community/Capacity Award. The award recognizes collection action over individual achievement and honors community-minded capacity building in digital libraries, archives and museums.

In appreciation of the services to taxonomists, a species of snail from Laos was named Vargapupa biheli in 2015, the species name derived from the initials BHL. A second species, a new species of fossil robber fly, Kishenehnoasilus bhl was named after the Biodiversity Heritage Library in 2019.

== Funding sources ==
The primary funding for the Biodiversity Heritage Library came via the Encyclopedia of Life through a grant from the John D. and Catherine T. MacArthur Foundation.

Additional grants have been received from The Gordon and Betty Moore Foundation, The Richard Lounsbery Foundation, the Institute of Museum and Library Services (IMLS). The Council on Library and Information Resources (CLIR) awarded the Biodiversity Heritage Library funding in 2015 as part of the Digitizing Hidden Special Collections and Archives program $491,713 to support increased accessibility to original scientific documentation found in archival field notes.

Members of the Biodiversity Heritage Library also have received generous support from their parent institutions. In addition to staffing and other costs, direct contributions have included the Atherton Seidell Endowment Fund by the Smithsonian Institution.
