= 2023–24 Combined Counties Football League =

Combined Counties Football League
- Season: 2023–24

The 2023–24 Combined Counties Football League season (known as the 2023–24 Cherry Red Records Combined Counties Football League for sponsorship reasons) was the 46th in the history of the Combined Counties Football League, a football competition in England. The league consists of four divisions for the first time, with a new Division Two being added to the Premier North, the Premier South and Division One. Division Two (details beyond the scope of this article) is intended largely for reserve and U23 sides, although it is also open to first teams.

The constitution was announced on 15 May 2023. Starting this season, the two step 5 divisions in the league each promote two clubs; one as champions and one via a four-team play-off. This replaced the previous inter-step play-off system. For this season only, there was only one club relegated from each of the two step 5 divisions.

== Premier Division North ==
Premier Division North remained at 20 clubs, after Ascot United were promoted to the Isthmian League South Central Division; Spelthorne Sports were transferred to Premier Division South, and Windsor and Oxhey Jets were relegated to Division One. After the constitution was announced, London Lions transferred to the Spartan South Midlands League in a swap with Ardley United.

Five new clubs joined the division:

- One relegated from the Isthmian League South Central Division:
  - Bedfont Sports
- Two transferred from the Spartan South Midlands League Premier Division:
  - Ardley United
  - Risborough Rangers
- One promoted from Division One:
  - Rayners Lane
- One promoted from Hellenic League Division One:
  - Milton United

=== League table ===
Pos	Team	Pld	W	D	L	GF	GA	GD	Pts	Promotion, qualification or relegation
1	Flackwell Heath (C, P)	38	30	5	3	99	27	+72	95	Promoted to the Southern League
2	Rayners Lane (O, P)	38	30	4	4	112	36	+76	90 (Note: Rayners Lane had four points deducted for fielding an ineligible player.)	Promoted to the Isthmian League
3	Bedfont Sports	38	22	9	7	97	34	+63	75	Qualification for the play-offs
4	Reading City	38	18	9	11	79	60	+19	63	Qualification for the play-offs
5	Holyport	38	19	4	15	61	61	0	61	Qualification for the play-offs
6	Burnham	38	17	7	14	92	68	+24	58	
7	Virginia Water	38	16	9	13	55	55	0	54 (Note: Virginia Water had three points deducted.)	
8	North Greenford United	38	15	8	15	64	64	0	53	
9	Broadfields United	38	15	7	16	72	82	−10	52	
10	Risborough Rangers	38	15	6	17	70	64	+6	51	
11	Ardley United	38	13	11	14	60	66	−6	50	
12	Milton United	38	14	7	17	57	73	−16	49	
13	Harefield United	38	14	4	20	52	63	−11	46	
14	Egham Town	38	10	13	15	54	66	−12	43	
15	Wokingham & Emmbrook	38	11	8	19	50	78	−28	41	
16	Wembley	38	10	9	19	43	89	−46	39	
17	Hilltop	38	10	6	22	57	87	−30	36	
18	Wallingford & Crowmarsh	38	9	9	20	47	86	−39	36	
19	Edgware & Kingsbury	38	8	10	20	48	76	−28	34	
20	Chalfont St Peter (R)	38	8	7	23	46	80	−34	31	Relegated to Division One

Source: CCL Prem Div North Table
Rules for classification: 1) points; 2) goal difference; 3) number of goals scored.
(C) Champions; (O) Play-off winners; (P) Promoted; (R) Relegated

=== Promotion playoffs ===
Semi-finals
2	Rayners Lane	4
5	Holyport	0
3	Bedfont Sports	5
4	Reading City	2

Final
2	Rayners Lane	1 (3)
3	Bedfont Sports	1 (0)

==== Semifinals ====
4 May	Rayners Lane	4–0	Holyport	Rayners Lane
15:00	Jalloh 35', 79', Bubb 50' (pen.), Connell 67'			Stadium: The Tithe Farm Social Club; Attendance: 220

4 May	Bedfont Sports	5–2	Reading City	Bedfont
15:00	Scott 1', 35', 63', Myers 37', 62'		Warre 12', Robinson 56'	Stadium: Bedfont Recreation Ground; Attendance: 263

==== Final ====
7 May	Rayners Lane	1–1 (3–0 p)	Bedfont Sports	Rayners Lane
19:45	Perez-Duah 67'		Greaver 90'	Stadium: The Tithe Farm Social Club; Attendance: 605

=== Stadia and locations ===
Location of the clubs in the 2023–24 Combined Counties League Premier Division North (Berkshire, Buckinghamshire, and Oxfordshire)
Location of the clubs in the 2023–24 Combined Counties League Premier Division North (Greater London)

Club	Location	Stadium	Capacity
Ardley United	Ardley	The Playing Fields	1,000
Bedfont Sports	Bedfont	Bedfont Recreation Ground	3,000
Broadfields United	Harrow	Tithe Farm Sports & Social Club (Note: Groundshare with Rayners Lane)	1,000
Burnham	Burnham	The 1878 Stadium	2,500
Chalfont St Peter	Chalfont St Peter	Mill Meadow	1,500
Edgware & Kingsbury	Kingsbury	Silver Jubilee Park (Note: Groundshare with Hendon)	1,990
Egham Town	Egham	Runnymede Stadium	5,500
Flackwell Heath	Flackwell Heath	Wilks Park	2,000
Harefield United	Harefield	Preston Park	1,200
Hilltop	Ruislip	Middlesex Stadium (Note: Groundshare with Hillingdon Borough)	3,587
Holyport	Maidenhead	Summerleaze Village	1,000
Milton United	Milton	Potash Lane	1,000
North Greenford United	Greenford	Berkeley Fields	2,000
Rayners Lane	Rayners Lane	The Tithe Farm Social Club	1,000
Reading City	Reading	Rivermoor Stadium	2,000
Risborough Rangers	Princes Risborough	The KAMTECH Stadium	1,500
Virginia Water	Windsor	Stag Meadow (Note: Groundshare with Windsor & Eton)	4,500
Wallingford & Crowmarsh	Wallingford	Hithercroft	1,500
Wembley	Wembley	Vale Farm	2,450
Wokingham & Emmbrook	Wokingham	Lowther Road	1,000

== Premier Division South ==
Premier Division South remained at 20 clubs after Raynes Park Vale and Badshot Lea were promoted to the Isthmian League South Central Division; Frimley Green were relegated to Wessex League Division One, and Banstead Athletic were relegated to Southern Combination League Division One.

Four new clubs joined the division:

- One relegated from the Isthmian League South Central Division:
  - Tooting & Mitcham United
- One transferred from Premier Division North:
  - Spelthorne Sports
- One promoted from Division One:
  - Sandhurst Town
- One promoted from Southern Combination League Division One:
  - Epsom & Ewell

=== League table ===
Pos	Team	Pld	W	D	L	GF	GA	GD	Pts	Promotion, qualification or relegation
1	Farnham Town (C, P)	38	35	3	0	130	19	+111	108	Promoted to the Isthmian League
2	Jersey Bulls	38	23	10	5	77	27	+50	79	Qualification for the play-offs
3	Knaphill	38	23	9	6	87	44	+43	78	Qualification for the play-offs
4	Tadley Calleva	38	22	5	11	72	57	+15	71	Qualification for the play-offs
5	AFC Croydon Athletic (O, P)	38	22	4	12	93	55	+38	70	Qualification for the play-offs
6	Redhill	38	20	6	12	78	50	+28	66	
7	Alton	38	19	8	11	76	54	+22	65	
8	Abbey Rangers	38	19	3	16	59	58	+1	60	
9	Balham	38	18	5	15	47	56	−9	59	
10	Sandhurst Town	38	16	5	17	73	78	−5	53	
11	Fleet Town	38	15	4	19	70	84	−14	49	
12	Cobham	38	12	10	16	62	64	−2	46	
13	Tooting & Mitcham United	38	14	3	21	59	81	−22	45	
14	Horley Town	38	11	7	20	67	82	−15	40	
15	Camberley Town	38	9	10	19	48	70	−22	37	
16	Epsom & Ewell	38	9	4	25	59	95	−36	31	
17	Spelthorne Sports	38	10	8	20	40	72	−32	30 (Note: Spelthorne Sports had eight points deducted.)	
18	Guildford City	38	8	5	25	46	99	−53	29	
19	Sheerwater	38	8	5	25	54	109	−55	29	
20	Colliers Wood United (R)	38	6	8	24	38	81	−43	26	Relegated to Division One

Source: CCL Prem Div South Table
Rules for classification: 1) points; 2) goal difference; 3) number of goals scored.
(C) Champions; (O) Play-off winners; (P) Promoted; (R) Relegated

=== Promotion playoffs ===
Semi-finals
2	Jersey Bulls	1
5	AFC Croydon Athletic	2
3	Knaphill	2
4	Tadley Calleva	0

Final
3	Knaphill	1
5	AFC Croydon Athletic	2

==== Semifinals ====
4 May	Jersey Bulls	1–2	AFC Croydon Athletic	Saint Helier
15:00	Campbell 45+5'	Report	Phillips 24', Pingling 69'	Stadium: Springfield Stadium; Attendance: 1,025

4 May	Knaphill	2–0	Tadley Calleva	Knaphill
15:00	Karczewski 72', Hawker 75'	Report		Stadium: Redding Way; Attendance: 507

==== Final ====
7 May	Knaphill	1–2	AFC Croydon Athletic	Knaphill
19:45	Karczewski 83' (pen.)	Report	Pierrick 44', Theophanous 47'	Stadium: Redding Way; Attendance: 872

=== Stadia and locations ===
Map showing the location of teams in Division 2
Location of the clubs in the 2023–24 Combined Counties League Premier Division South (Surrey)
Location of the clubs in the 2023–24 Combined Counties League Premier Division South (Hampshire)
Location of the clubs in the 2023–24 Combined Counties League Premier Division South (Channel Islands)

Club	Location	Stadium	Capacity
Abbey Rangers	Addlestone	Addlestone Moor	1,000
AFC Croydon Athletic	Thornton Heath	Mayfield Stadium	3,000
Alton	Alton	Anstey Park	2,000
Balham	Thornton Heath	Mayfield Stadium (Note: Groundshare with AFC Croydon Athletic)	3,000
Camberley Town	Camberley	Krooner Park	1,976
Cobham	Cobham	Leg O'Mutton Field	2,000
Colliers Wood United	Wimbledon	Wibbandune Sports Ground	2,000
Epsom & Ewell	Cobham	Leg O'Mutton Field (Note: Groundshare with Cobham)	2,000
Farnham Town	Farnham	Memorial Ground	1,500
Fleet Town	Fleet	Calthorpe Park	2,000
Guildford City	Guildford	Spectrum Football Ground	1,320
Horley Town	Horley	The New Defence	1,800
Jersey Bulls	Saint Helier	Springfield Stadium	2,000
Knaphill	Knaphill	Redding Way	1,000
Redhill	Redhill	Kiln Brow	2,000
Sandhurst Town	Sandhurst	Bottom Meadow	1,950
Sheerwater	Sheerwater	Eastwood Centre	600
Spelthorne Sports	Ashford	Spelthorne Sports Club	1,000
Tadley Calleva	Tadley	Barlows Park	1,000
Tooting & Mitcham United	Mitcham	Imperial Fields	3,500

== Division One ==
Division One was increased from 21 to 22 clubs after Rayners Lane were promoted to Premier Division North; Sandhurst Town were promoted to Premier Division South; A.F.C. Aldermaston and Cove were transferred to Wessex League Division One, and CB Hounslow United were relegated.

Six new clubs joined the division:

- Two relegated from Premier Division North:
  - Oxhey Jets
  - Windsor
- One relegated from the Spartan South Midlands League Premier Division:
  - London Colney
- Two transferred from Spartan South Midlands League Division One:
  - Amersham Town
  - Holmer Green
- One promoted from the Thames Valley Premier League:
  - Yateley United
- Berks County were promoted on a PPG (points per game) basis despite losing the play-off final.

=== League table ===
Pos	Team	Pld	W	D	L	GF	GA	GD	Pts	Promotion, qualification or relegation
1	Amersham Town (C, P)	42	36	3	3	155	48	+107	111	Promoted to the Premier Division North
2	British Airways (O, P)	42	30	4	8	112	66	+46	94	Qualified for the play-offs, then promoted to the Premier Division North
3	Berks County (P)	42	26	7	9	111	63	+48	85	Qualified for the play-offs, then promoted to the Premier Division North
4	Eversley & California	42	25	7	10	91	53	+38	82	Qualification for the play-offs
5	Rising Ballers Kensington	42	23	8	11	90	50	+40	77	Qualification for the play-offs
6	Molesey	42	24	5	13	91	68	+23	77	
7	Yateley United	42	21	8	13	85	65	+20	71	
8	Langley	42	20	8	14	94	80	+14	68	
9	Penn & Tylers Green	42	17	8	17	79	71	+8	59	
10	Oxhey Jets	42	16	9	17	83	77	+6	57	
11	FC Deportivo Galicia	42	15	12	15	88	95	−7	57	
12	Bedfont	42	16	7	19	86	89	−3	55	
13	London Samurai Rovers	42	15	7	20	87	91	−4	52	
14	Westside	42	14	10	18	71	79	−8	52	
15	Spartans Youth	42	14	10	18	60	76	−16	52 (Note: The match between Spartans Youth and Woodley united was awarded to Spartans Youth as a home walkover.)	
16	Woodley United	42	13	10	19	62	68	−6	49 (Note: The match between Woodley United and Oxhey Jets remained unplayed and was decided as a 0–0 draw.)	
17	Brook House	42	13	7	22	75	104	−29	46	
18	Windsor	42	13	3	26	70	111	−41	42	
19	Hillingdon Borough	42	12	6	24	69	112	−43	42	
20	Holmer Green	42	9	4	29	46	126	−80	31	Reprieved from relegation
21	London Colney	42	7	9	26	52	85	−33	30 (Note: The match between London Colney and Bagshot was awarded to London Colney as a home walkover.)	Reprieved and transferred to the Spartan South Midlands League
22	Bagshot (R)	42	5	4	33	41	121	−80	19	Relegated to the Surrey Premier League

Source: CCL Div One Table
Rules for classification: 1) points; 2) goal difference; 3) number of goals scored.
(C) Champions; (O) Play-off winners; (P) Promoted; (R) Relegated

=== Promotion playoffs ===
Semi-finals
2	British Airways	2
5	Rising Ballers Kensington	0
3	Berks County	2
4	Eversley & California	1

Final
2	British Airways	0 (7)
3	Berks County	0 (6)

==== Semifinals ====
4 May	British Airways	2–0	Rising Ballers Kensington	Bedfont
15:00	Barnett, John			Stadium: The Orchard; Attendance: 189

4 May	Berks County	2–1	Eversley & California	Binfield
15:00			Samuel-Harman	Stadium: Hill Farm Lane; Attendance: 270

==== Final ====
7 May	British Airways	0–0 (7–6 p)	Berks County	Bedfont
19:45				Stadium: The Orchard; Attendance: 457

=== Stadia and locations ===
Location of the clubs in the 2023–24 Combined Counties League Division One (Berkshire and Buckinghamshire)
Location of the clubs in the 2023–24 Combined Counties League Division One (Greater London)

Club	Location	Stadium	Capacity
Amersham Town	Amersham	Spratleys Meadow	1,500
Bagshot	Camberley	Krooner Park (Note: Groundshare with Camberley Town)	1,976
Bedfont	Bedfont	The Orchard	1,200
Berks County	Ascot	Ascot Racecourse (Note: Groundshare with Ascot United)	1,150
British Airways	Bedfont	The Orchard (Note: Groundshare with Bedfont)	1,200
Brook House	Hayes	Farm Park	2,000
Eversley & California	Eversley	Fox Lane	1,000
FC Deportivo Galicia	Bedfont	Bedfont Recreation Ground (Note: Groundshare with Bedfont Sports)	3,000
Hillingdon Borough	Ruislip	Middlesex Stadium	3,587
Holmer Green	Holmer Green	Watchet Lane	
Langley	West Drayton	Honeycroft (Note: Groundshare with Uxbridge)	3,770
London Colney	London Colney	Cotlandswick Park	1,000
London Samurai Rovers	Hanworth	Rectory Meadow (Note: Groundshare with Hanworth Villa)	1,000
Molesey	West Molesey	Walton Road	4,000
Oxhey Jets	South Oxhey	The Boundary Stadium	2,000
Penn & Tylers Green	Penn	French School Meadow	900
Rising Ballers Kensington	Greenford	Berkeley Fields (Note: Groundshare with North Greenford United)	2,000
Spartans Youth	Northwood	Northwood Park (Note: Groundshare with Northwood)	3,075
Westside	Wimbledon	Wibbandune Sports Ground (Note: Groundshare with Colliers Wood United)	2,000
Windsor	Beaconsfield	Holloways Park (Note: Groundshare with Beaconsfield Town)	3,500
Woodley United	Tilehurst, Reading	Rivermoor Stadium (Note: Groundshare with Reading City)	2,000
Yateley United	Yateley	Sean Devereux Park	500
