= Sherborne, England =

Sherborne, England may refer to:

- Sherborne, Dorset
- Sherborne, Gloucestershire
- Sherborne, Somerset

== See also ==
- Sherbourne (disambiguation)
