= Carabus cavernosus variolatus =

Scientific classification
- Kingdom: Animalia
- Phylum: Arthropoda
- Clade: Pancrustacea
- Class: Insecta
- Order: Coleoptera
- Suborder: Adephaga
- Family: Carabidae
- Genus: Carabus
- Species: C. cavernosus
- Subspecies: C. c. variolatus

Trinomial name
- Carabus cavernosus variolatus Costa, 1839

Synonyms
- Carabus rosti Beuthin, 1885; Carabus seriatofoveatus Reitter, 1896

Subspecies of beetle

Carabus cavernosus variolatus is a subspecies of black coloured ground beetle in the subfamily Carabinae that is endemic to Central Italy.
