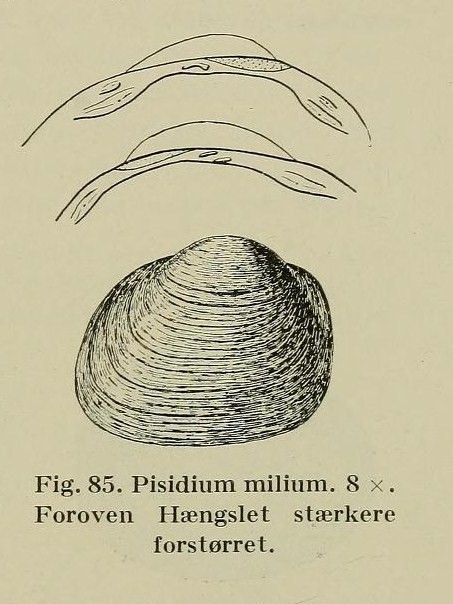
- Drawing from Dansk Fauna showing the valve articulation and the rectangular form

Conservation status
- Least Concern (IUCN 3.1)(Global, Europe)

- Critically endangered, possibly extinct (IUCN 3.1) (North & Pan-Africa)

Scientific classification
- Kingdom: Animalia
- Phylum: Mollusca
- Class: Bivalvia
- Order: Sphaeriida
- Family: Sphaeriidae
- Genus: Pisidium
- Species: P. milium

Binomial name
- Pisidium milium Held, 1836

= Pisidium milium =

- Drawing of the left valve internal view of Pisidium milium

Species of bivalve

Pisidium milium is a species of very small freshwater bivalve in the family Sphaeriidae, the fingernail clams and pea clams.

== Description ==
The 3.0- to 4.5-mm shell is tumid (swollen). It is more rectangular than other Pisidium species and has broad, swollen umbos which lie behind the midpoint. The surface (periostracum) is very glossy, with irregular, concentric striae. The colour is yellow to pale brown.

== Distribution ==
The native distribution of this species is Holarctic.

- Czech Republic –in Bohemia, in Moravia, vulnerable (VU)
- Slovakia
- Germany – (Arten der Vorwarnliste)
- Nordic countries: Denmark, Faroes, Finland, Iceland, Norway and Sweden
- Great Britain and Ireland
