= Biodiversity Heritage Library for Europe =

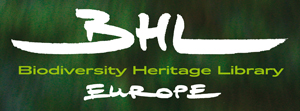
Logo of the BHL-Europe project

The Biodiversity Heritage Library for Europe (BHL-Europe) was a three-year (2009–2012) EU project aimed to the coordination of digitization of literature on biodiversity. It involved 28 major natural history museums, botanical gardens, libraries and other European institutions. BHL-Europe was founded in Berlin in May 2009 and regarded itself as a European partner project of the Biodiversity Heritage Library (BHL) project, which was founded in 2005 and initially formed by ten (since 2009, twelve) United States and British libraries.

BHL-Europe was a best practice network. Important components were the coordination of digitization and the creation of appropriate infrastructure, as well as the consolidation of various European digitization projects under a common centralized and multilingual BHL portal. The scope was to make available the digitized literature under Open Access and Creative Commons licenses, and to improve its searchability (using OCR).

BHL-Europe was also responsible for the creation of structures for long-term storage of digital information (durability of digital data).

== Composition of BHL-Europe ==
The following 28 institutions functioned in May 2009 in Berlin as the founding members of the consortium of BHL-Europe:

- Museum für Naturkunde (Berlin) (project leadership)
- Natural History Museum (London)
- National Museum (Prague)
- European Digital Library Foundation (Europeana)
- Angewandte Informationstechnik Forschungsgesellschaft AIT (Graz)
- Atos Origin Integration France (Paris)
- Freie Universität Berlin
- Georg-August-Universität Göttingen (AnimalBase)
- Naturhistorisches Museum Wien
- Oberösterreichische Landesmuseen (Linz)
- Museum and Institute of Zoology, Polish Academy of Sciences (Warszawa)
- Hungarian Natural History Museum (Budapest)
- University of Copenhagen
- Naturalis (Leiden)
- National Botanic Garden of Belgium - Meise
- Royal Museum for Central Africa (Tervuren)
- Royal Belgian Institute of Natural Sciences
- Bibliothèque nationale de France (Paris) (Gallica)
- Museum national d'histoire naturelle (Paris)
- Spanish National Research Council (Madrid)
- Università degli Studi di Firenze
- Royal Botanic Garden Edinburgh
- Species 2000
- John Wiley & Sons
- Smithsonian Institution (Washington)
- Missouri Botanical Garden (St. Louis)
- University of Helsinki
- Humboldt-Universität zu Berlin
