= Bedfont Lakes Country Park =

Nature reserve in Bedfont, London, England

Coordinates: 51.443°N 0.449°W

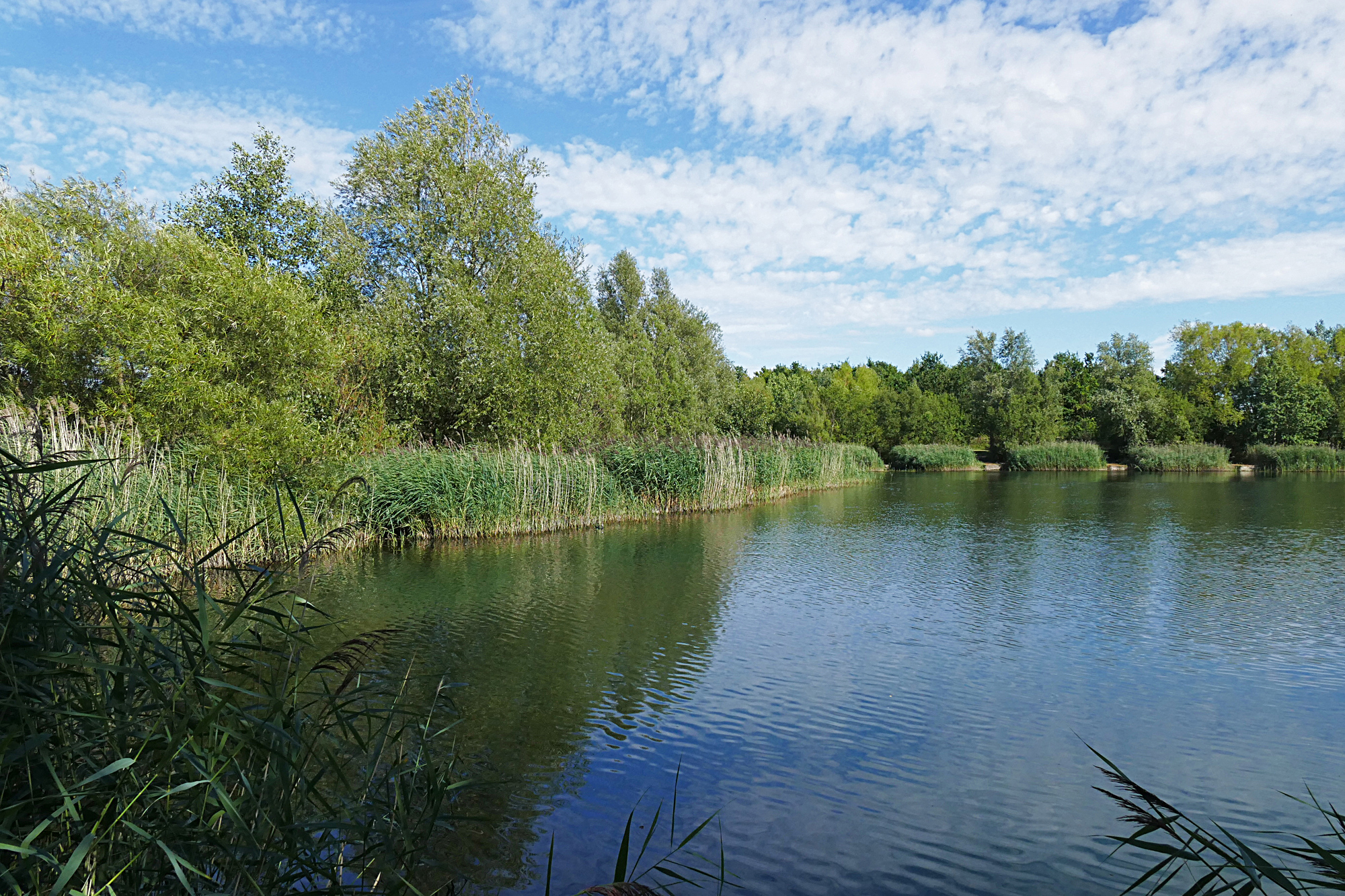
Bedfont Lakes Country Park

Bedfont Lakes Country Park is a 72.5-hectare Local Nature Reserve and Site of Metropolitan Importance for Nature Conservation in Bedfont in the London Borough of Hounslow.

The land had been Fawn's Manor Farm, and was owned by the Duke of St Albans until it was purchased by William Sherborn in 1780. Until the 1920s it supplied London with produce, and gravel extraction took place from the 1860s. From the 1950s until 1973 it was used as a landfill site for domestic and industrial waste, and polluted lakes remained after it was closed. In 1988 The Rutland Group acquired Bedfont Lakes and, working with Hounslow Council, secured the development of the area as a country park as a planning condition for development of the surrounding area.

Rutland managed the park for three years before donating it to the people of South West London, together with an endowment fund to maintain the parklands in perpetuity. In 2000 Bedfont Lakes received nature reserve status, winning multiple awards nationally and regionally including the Millennium Marque and the London in Bloom Wildflower and Environment Trophy.

The site has lakes, wetlands, wildflower meadows and woodland. There are over 350 species of plants, including field scabious, lady's bedstraw and black poplar. There are also 156 species of birds, 124 of moths, 97 of fungi and 20 mammals.

There are car parks in Bedfont Road and Clockhouse Lane.

== Gallery ==
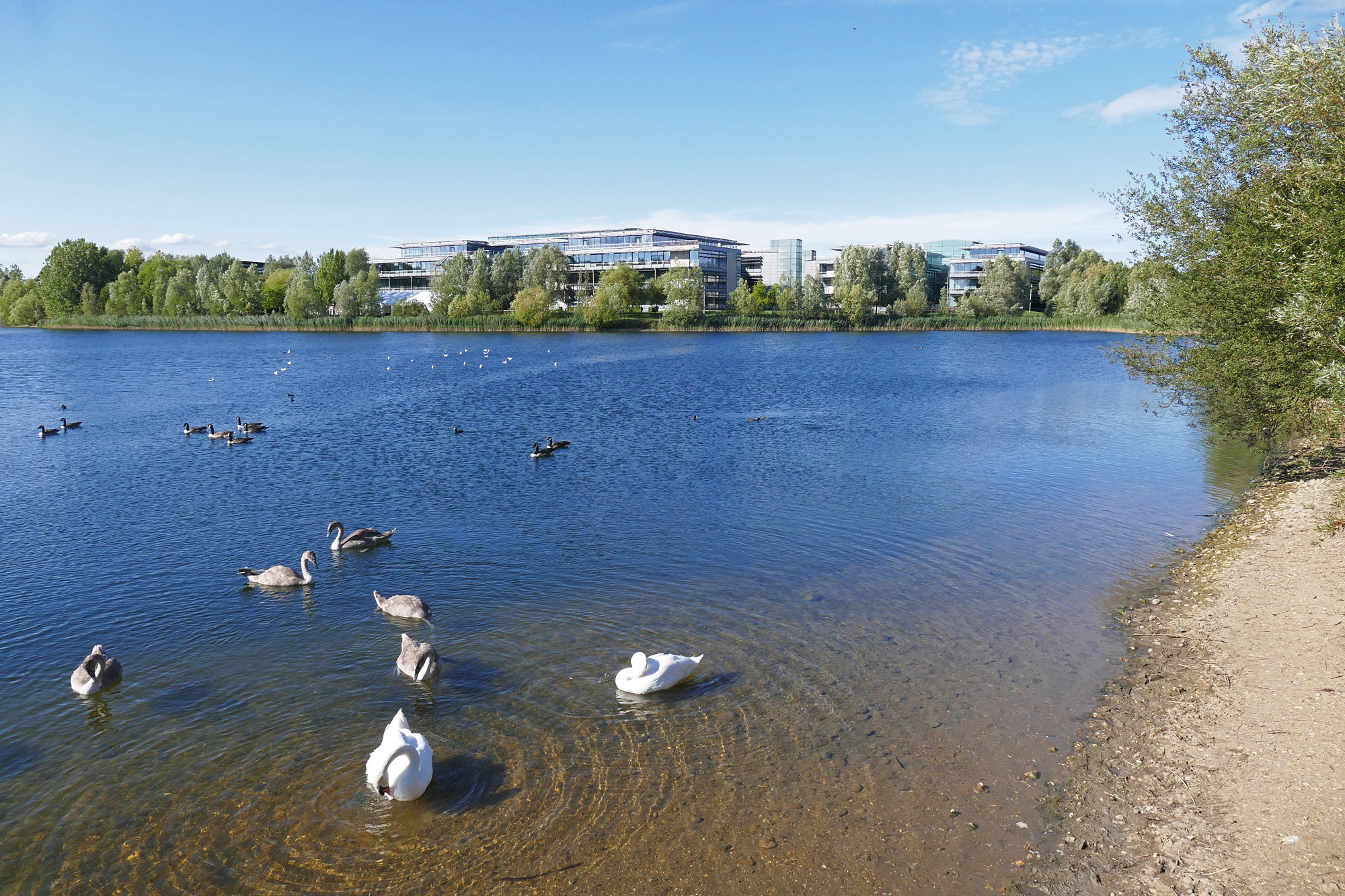
North Lake with Cisco Systems office at Bedfont Lakes Business Park in the background

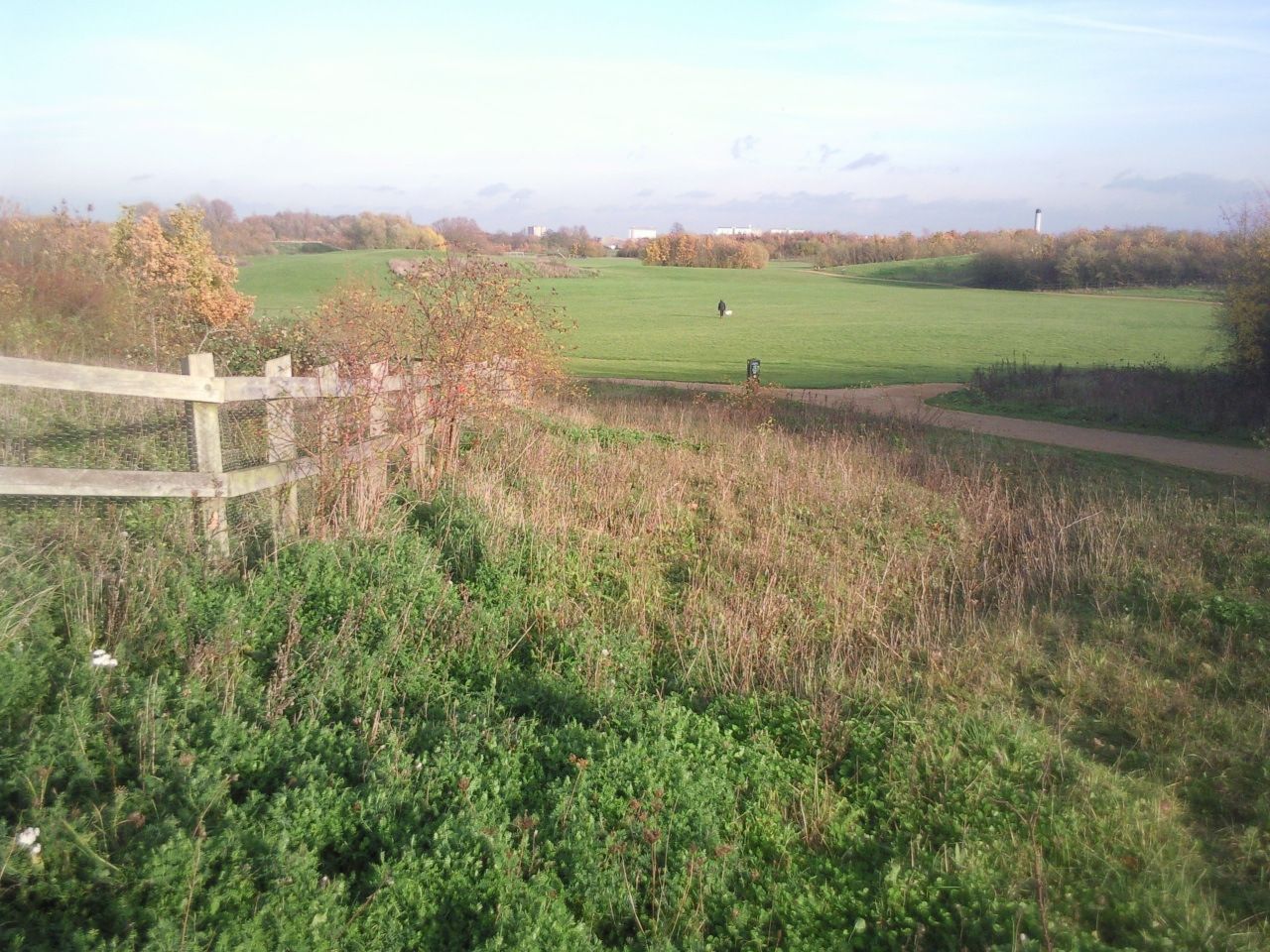
View across the park. The chimney of HM Prison Feltham is visible to the right

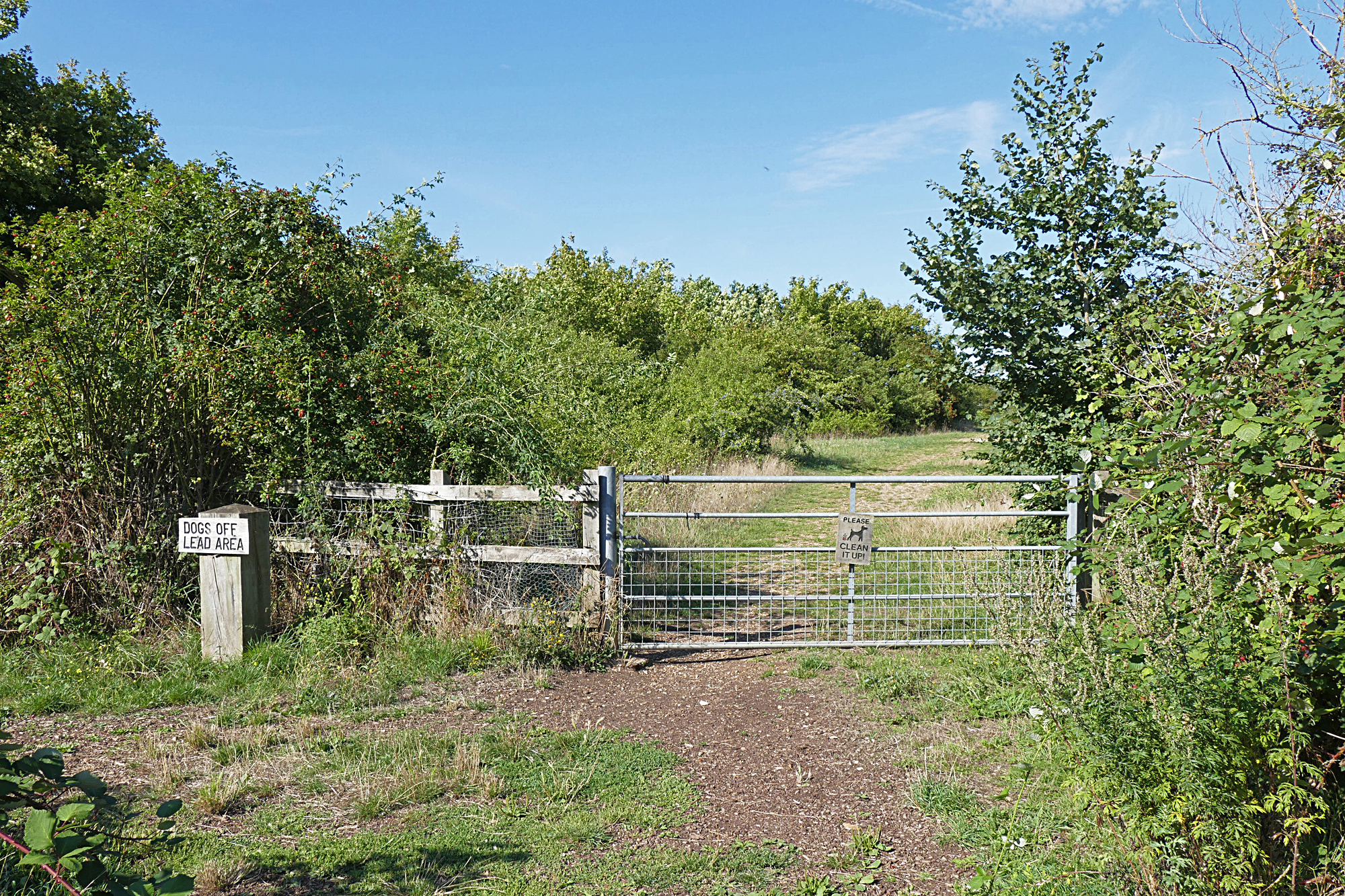
Dog walking area

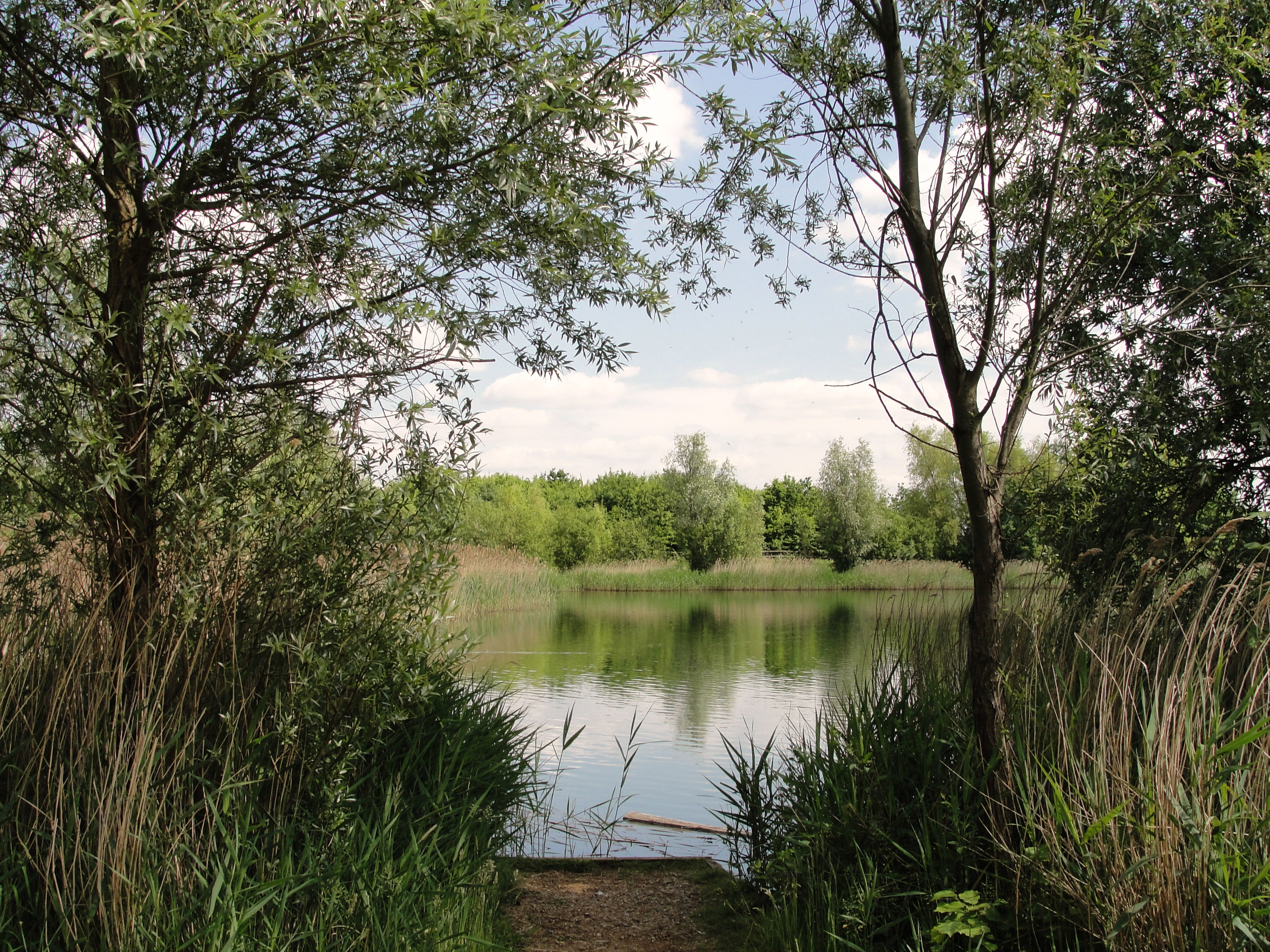
There are multiple fishing lakes in the park

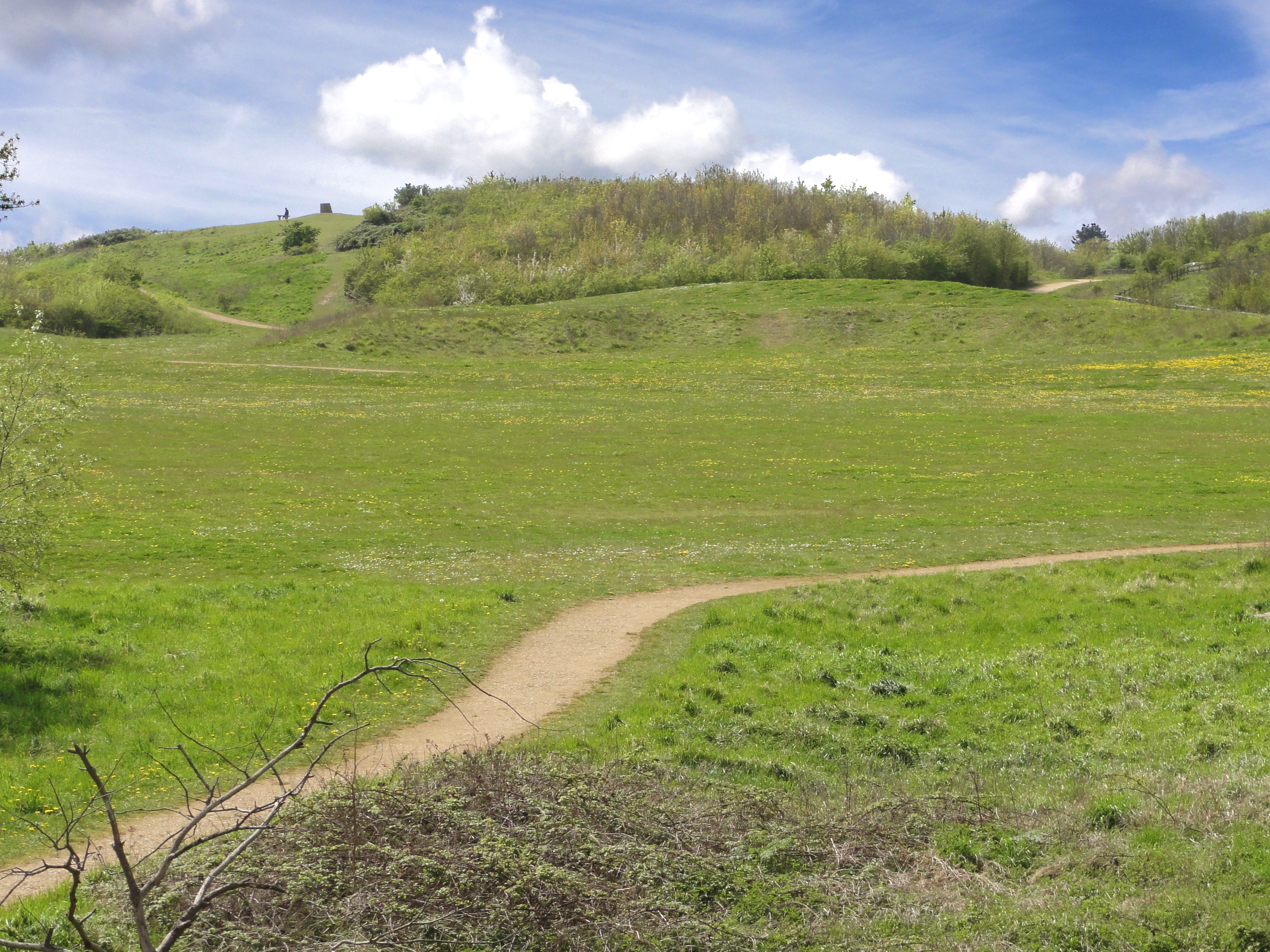
Hill topped by Millennium Monolith showing distances to various landmarks

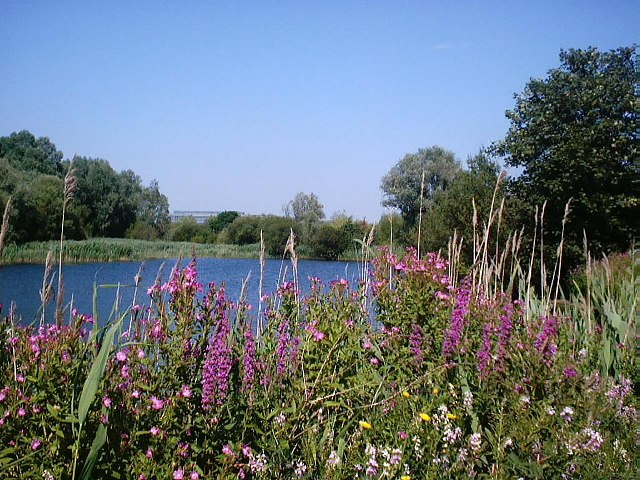
The park is home to a wide variety of plants
