= Carabus cavernosus cavernosus =

Scientific classification
- Domain: Eukaryota
- Kingdom: Animalia
- Phylum: Arthropoda
- Class: Insecta
- Order: Coleoptera
- Suborder: Adephaga
- Family: Carabidae
- Genus: Carabus
- Species: C. cavernosus
- Subspecies: C. c. cavernosus

Trinomial name
- Carabus cavernosus cavernosus E. Frivaldsky, 1837

Synonyms
- Carabus sterbai Breuning, 1936; Carabus cavernosulus Mandl, 1961

Subspecies of beetle

Carabus cavernosus cavernosus is a subspecies of black coloured ground beetle in the subfamily Carabinae that can be found in Albania, Bosnia and Herzegovina, Bulgaria, Romania, and everywhere in Yugoslavia (except for Slovenia).
