= Sherbourne =

Sherbourne may refer to:

- Sherbourne, Barbados, a populated place
- Sherbourne, Warwickshire, a village in Warwickshire, England
- Sherbourne (TTC), a subway station in Toronto, Ontario, Canada
- River Sherbourne, a river in Coventry and Warwickshire
- Sherborne, a town in Dorset, England

== People with the surname ==
- Stephen Sherbourne (born 1945), British politician

== See also ==
- Sherbourne Park, a former baseball stadium in Winnipeg, Manitoba, Canada
- Sherbourne Street (disambiguation)
- Sherbourne Conference Centre, Barbados
- Sherborne (disambiguation)
- Sherborn (disambiguation)
