= Friedrich Held =

German malacologist

Friedrich Held (21 July 1812 – 25 January 1872) was a German malacologist. His name is honoured by the research organization Friedrich Held Gesellschaft Verein zur Förderung der wissenschaftlichen Weichtierkunde e.V.

== Works ==
- Held F. 1836. Aufzählung der in Bayern lebenden Mollusken Isis 1836 (4): 271-282. Leipzig.
- Held, F. 1837 Notizen über die Weichthiere Bayerns Isis 1837 (4): 303-309. Leipzig.
- Held, F. 1838. Notizen über die Weichthiere Bayerns (Fortsetzung) Isis 1837 (12): 902-919. Leipzig.

All digitised at AnimalBase
