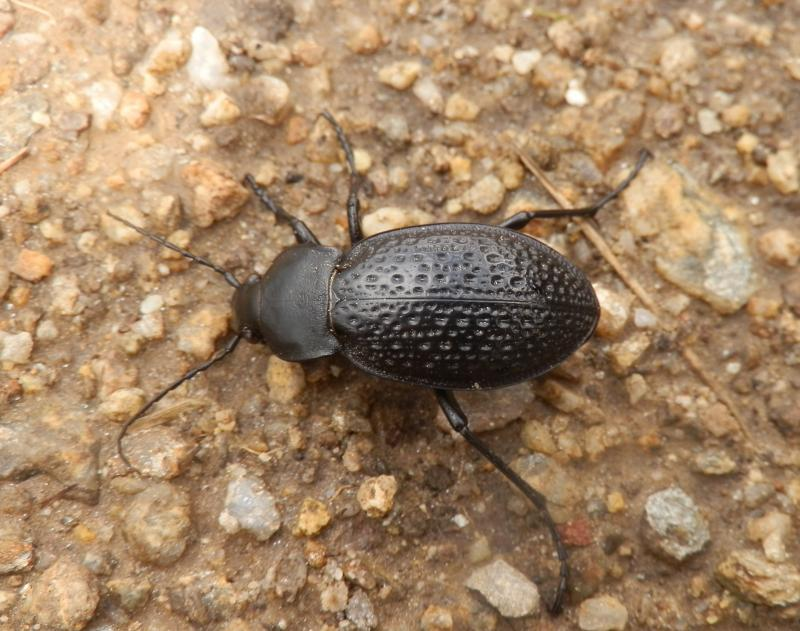

Scientific classification
- Domain: Eukaryota
- Kingdom: Animalia
- Phylum: Arthropoda
- Class: Insecta
- Order: Coleoptera
- Suborder: Adephaga
- Family: Carabidae
- Genus: Carabus
- Species: C. cavernosus

Binomial name
- Carabus cavernosus E. Frivaldszky, 1837

= Carabus cavernosus =

Species of beetle

Carabus cavernosus is a species of ground beetle in the subfamily Carabinae that can be found in Albania, Bulgaria, Italy, and in every republic of the former Yugoslavia.

== Subspecies ==
The species have only 2 subspecies which are native to Albania, Bulgaria, Italy, and the republics of former Yugoslavia:

- Carabus cavernosus cavernosus Frivaldsky, 1837
- Carabus cavernosus variolatus Costa, 1839 Italy
