= Bedfont Sports F.C. =

Association football club in England

Coordinates: 51°27′36″N 0°25′37″W

Bedfont Sports
- Full name: Bedfont Sports Football Club
- Nickname: The Eagles
- Founded: 2002
- Ground: Bedfont Recreation Ground, Bedfont
- Capacity: 3,000
- Chairman: Craig Woodbridge
- Manager: Alfie Chapman
- League: Isthmian League South Central Division
- 2025–26: Isthmian League South Central Division, 15th of 22
Home colours	Away colours

Bedfont Sports Football Club is a football club based in Bedfont, Greater London, England. They are currently members of the Isthmian League South Central Division and play at the Bedfont Recreation Ground.

== History ==
The club was established in 2002 as a Saturday team for Bedfont Sunday, a Sunday league team, and shortly afterwards absorbed the Bedfont Eagles youth club. In 2003 they joined Division One of the Hounslow and District League, going on to win it at the first attempt.

In 2004 Bedfont joined Division One of the Middlesex County League, and after finishing as runners-up in their first season, were promoted to the Premier Division. In 2006–07 and 2007–08 they won the league's Open Cup, whilst the 2008–09 season saw them win the Middlesex Premier Cup and finish third in the Premier Division, after which they moved up to Division One of the Combined Counties League. In 2011–12 they finished as runners-up in Division One, earning promotion to the Premier Division.

The 2017–18 season saw Bedfont finish as runners-up in the Premier Division, earning promotion to the South Central Division of the Isthmian League. They finished second-from-bottom of the division in 2022–23 season and were relegated to the Premier Division North of the Combined Counties League. In 2023–24 the club finished third in the Premier Division North, qualifying for the promotion play-offs. After beating Reading City 5–2 in the semi-finals, they lost the final against Rayners Lane on penalties. They were Premier Division North runners-up the following season, going on to beat North Greenford United 3–1 the play-off semi-finals and then Harefield United by the same scoreline in the final, earning promotion to the South Central Division of the Isthmian League.

== Ground ==
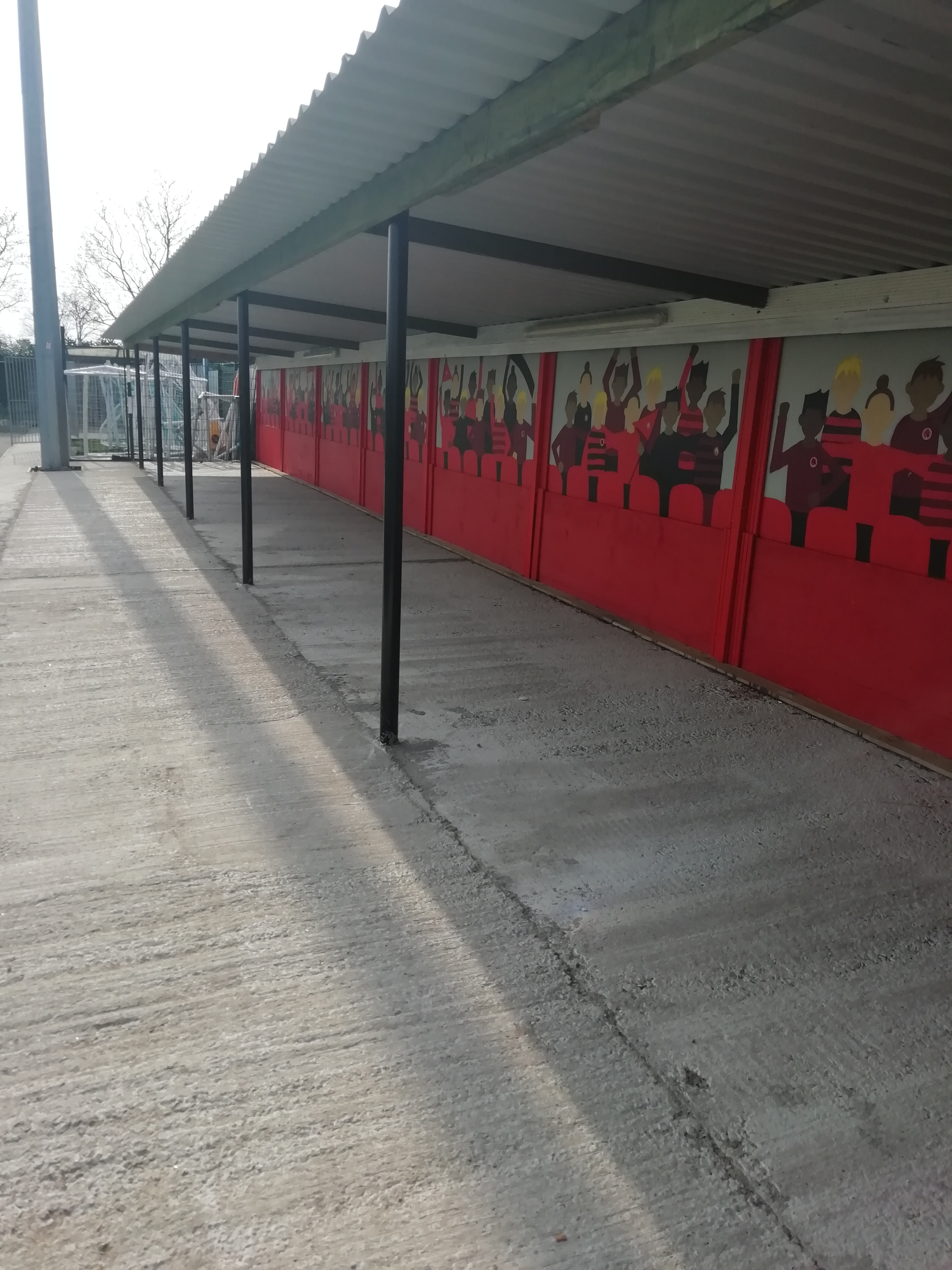

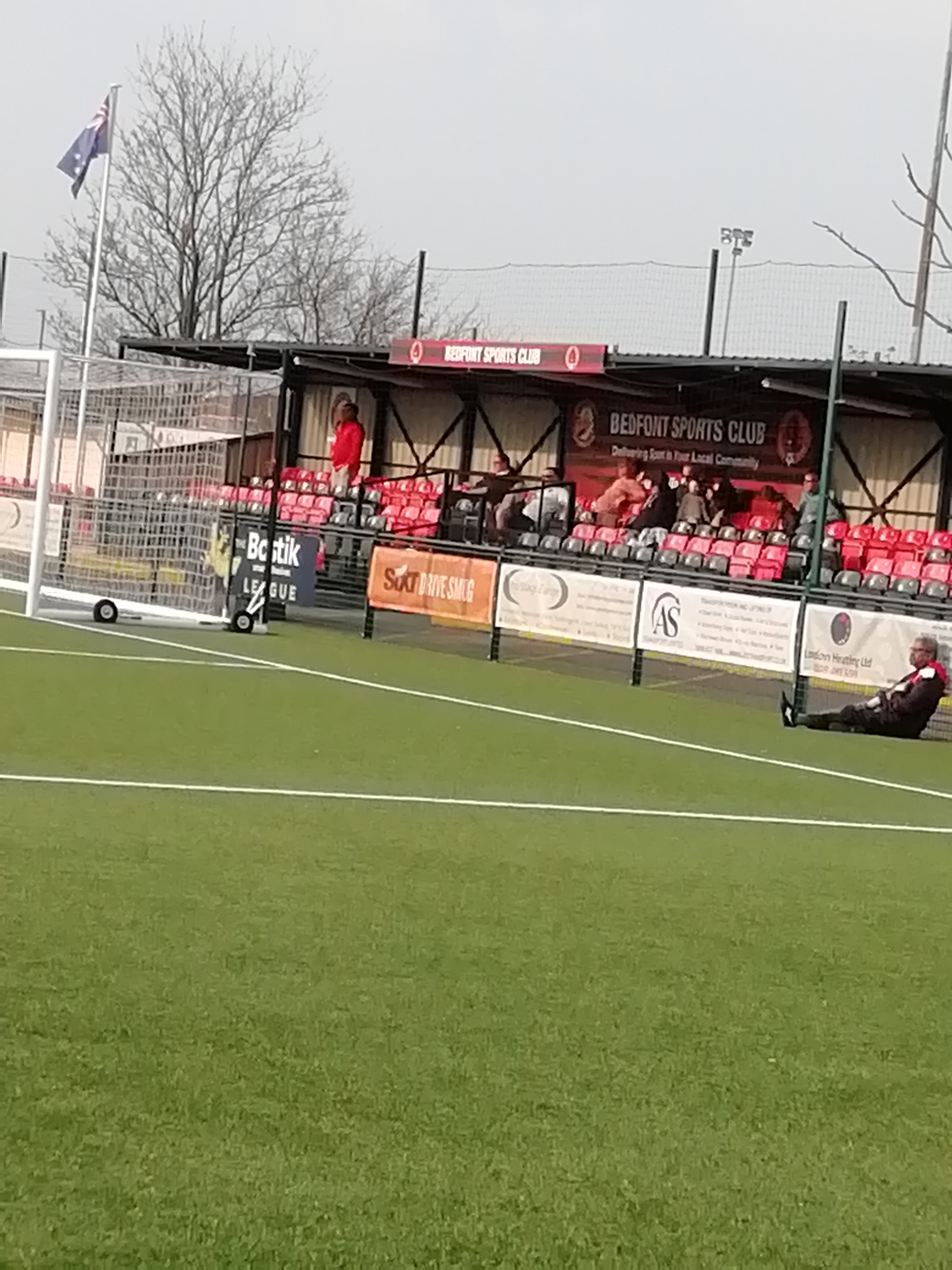

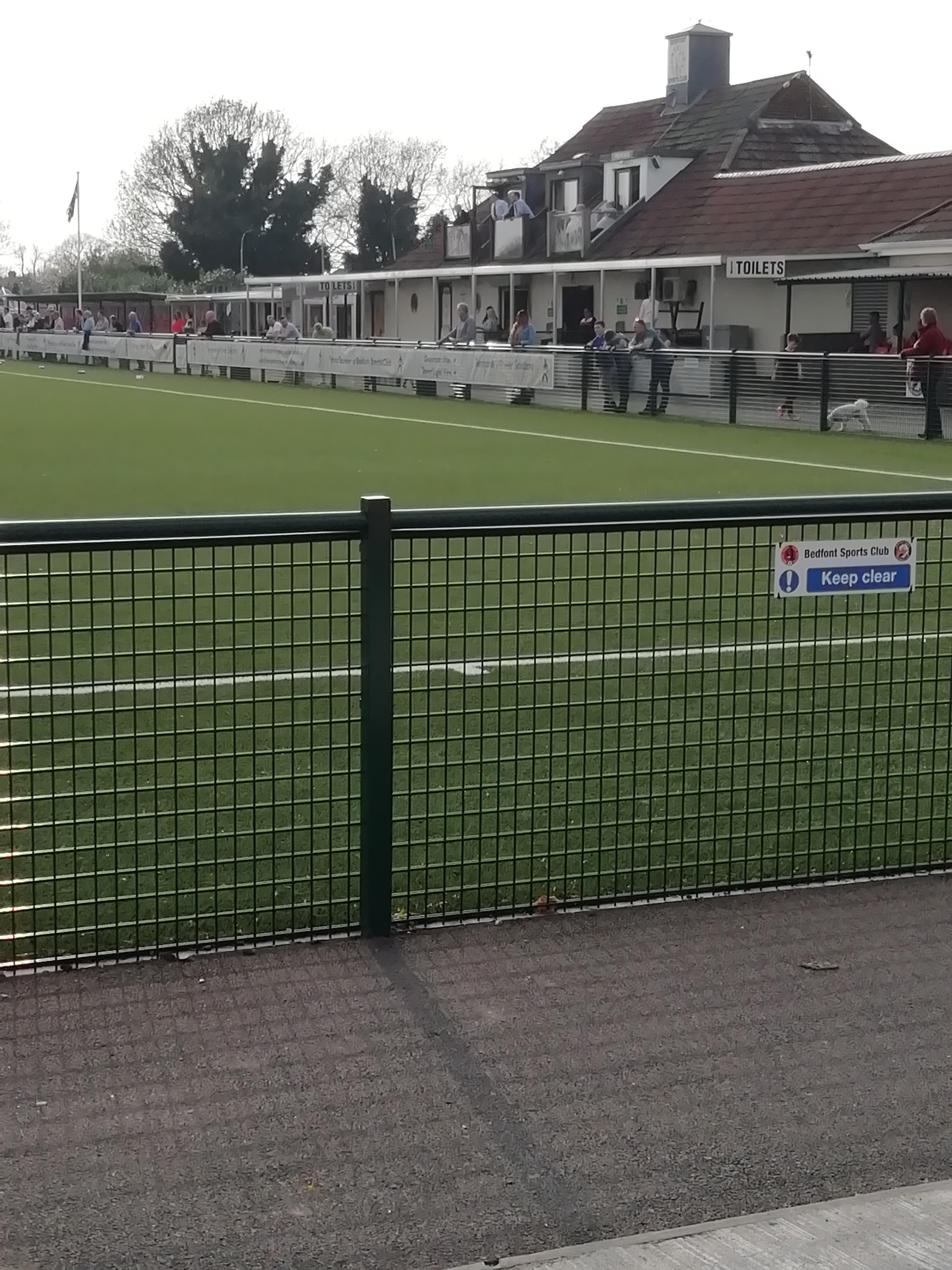

The club play at the Bedfont Recreation Ground on Hatton Road in Bedfont. It has a capacity of 3,000, of which 200 is covered. In 2018, the Bedfont Recreation Ground hosted a number of games in the CONIFA World Cup.

== Honours ==
- Middlesex County League
  - Open Cup winners 2006–07, 2007–08
- Hounslow and District League
  - Division One champions 2003–04
- Middlesex Premier Cup
  - Winners 2009–10
- Combined Counties Premier North Play Off
  - Winners 2024–25

== Records ==
- Best FA Cup performance: Fourth qualifying round, 2021–22
- Best FA Trophy performance: First round, 2021–22
- Best FA Vase performance: Third round, 2016–17
- Combined Counties Premier North - Play Off Winners 24/25

== See also ==
- Bedfont Sports F.C. players
