= Charles William Sherborn =

English engraver

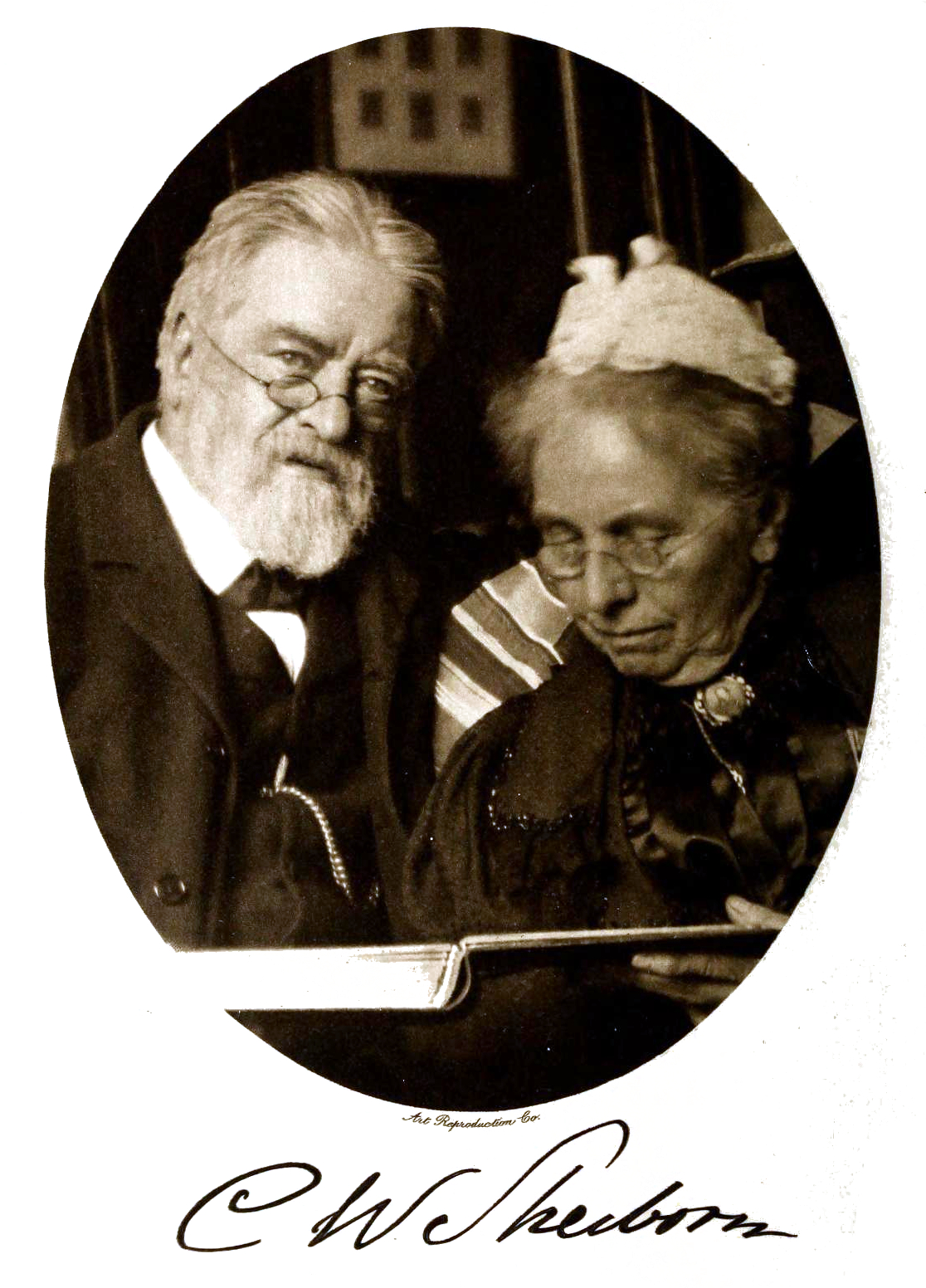
Sherborn and his wife Hannah Wait

Charles William Sherborn, RE (14 June 1831 – 10 February 1912) was an English engraver, who chiefly made bookplates. He has been hailed as having led the revival in copper-engraved bookplates, and came to be called the "Victorian little master".

== Early life and education ==
The eldest son of Charles Sherborn, an upholsterer, and Mary Brance, he was born at Leicester Square in London. His ancestors were landed gentry, lords of the manors of Fawns and Cockbell in Bedfont; Fawns Manor was still in the possession of his fourth cousin, William Sherborn. On William's death in 1912, Charles William Sherborn dying that same year, his son, Charles Davies Sherborn, inherited the manor. The last owner was Charles Davies Sherborn's great-nephew, the conservationist Derek Sherborn.

He studied at the government school of drawing and design in Somerset House, and was apprenticed to Robert Oliver, a silver-plate engraver based in Soho. He travelled to the Continent in October 1852, and was based in Geneva from September 1853, where he worked as a goldsmith's designer and engraver. He returned to England in September 1856, and began engraving for London jewellers.

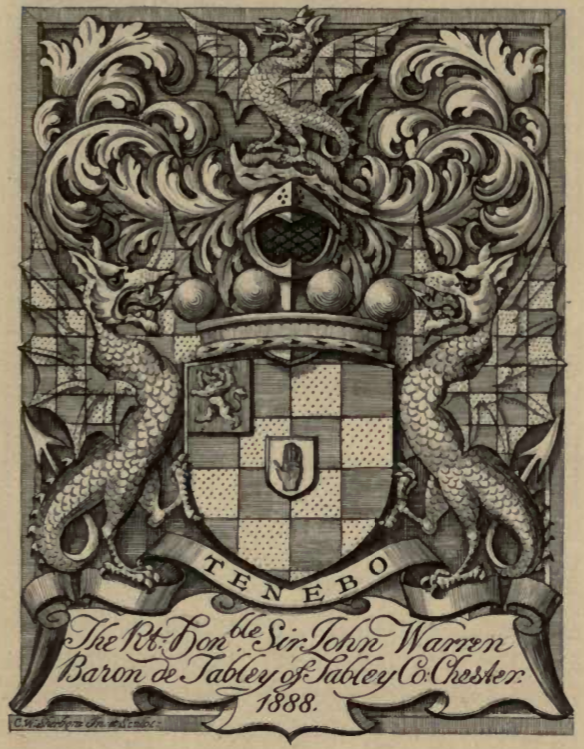
An example of his work: the bookplate of John Lord de Tabley

== Career ==
In 1872, he decided to work independently as an etcher and engraver, mainly reproducing contemporary portraits and subject paintings, and designing bookplates, the latter of which would later form the bulk of his work. He also made original etchings of London and was a regular exhibitor at the Royal Academy. He was a close friend of Sir Francis Seymour Haden, co-founder of the Royal Society of Painter-Etchers and Engravers, and was elected a fellow of that society in 1884. Before his death, he presented a complete set of his works to the British Museum.

Sherborn died at Kensington in 1912, at the age of eighty. He had married in 1860 Hannah Wait (d. 1922), the daughter of Thomas Davies, a watchmaker, and widow of Thomas Wait, a draper. By her he had four sons and a daughter, the eldest of whom, Charles Davies, became noted as a bibliographer.
