= AnimalBase =

German digitizer of zoological works

AnimalBase is a project brought to life in 2004 and is maintained by the University of Göttingen, Germany. The goal of the AnimalBase project is to digitize early zoological literature, provide copyright-free open access to zoological works, and provide manually verified lists of names of zoological genera and species as a free resource for the public. AnimalBase contributed to opening up the classical taxonomic literature, which is considered as useful because access to early literature (especially for the late 18th century) can be difficult for researchers who need the old sources for their taxonomic research.

AnimalBase data are public domain. The public use of AnimalBase data is not restricted or conditioned. AnimalBase covers all zoological disciplines. In the field of biodiversity informatics AnimalBase is unique in providing links between the names of generic and specific taxa and their digitized original descriptions, with a special focus on literature and names published prior to 1800.

== History ==
The project was initiated in 2003 with funding from the German Research Foundation (DFG). The database and its web interface began development in 2004 and was launched online in 2005. The web interface was designed to be accessible to older generations of computers and web browsers. Between 2003 and 2005 approximately 400 zoological publications from the 1550s to 1770 were digitized while 10,000 linked zoological names were incorporated into the database. A second effort (2008–2011) has included additional digitized literature giving access to several ten thousand more zoological names that were extracted from the original sources and linked with their digitized original descriptions.

== Digitization and linking to digitized literature from other sources ==
Early zoological publications are digitized under the highest quality standards by the Center for Retrospective Digitization in Göttingen (Göttinger Digitalisierungszentrum, GDZ) of the Göttingen State and University Library (Staats- und Universitätsbibliothek Göttingen, SUB), which is one of Germany's largest libraries, including over 4.5 million volumes. If available, AnimalBase also provides links to the digitized public domain content of other providers, such as the Biodiversity Heritage Library (BHL) or Gallica.

== Extracting taxonomic names from the literature ==
Zoological names of generic and specific taxa that were established in early zoological publications have been entered manually into the database, including original and corrected spellings of names, type localities and page numbers where these names were originally established in the publications. Furthermore, the names have been compared to the entries in Charles Davies Sherborn's Index Animalium (1902, 1922–1933) and the Nomenclator Zoologicus by Neave (1939/1940, updated). The nomenclatural status of names has been verified under the current edition of the International Code of Zoological Nomenclature (ICZN). Possible discrepancies between older databases and the findings from AnimalBase name research (i.e. nomenclatural priority or incorrect spellings) have occasionally been discussed in the comments provided for each taxon. The entire process has followed the established AnimalBase standard.

== AnimalBase standard ==
Specific and generic names of taxa are entered manually with reference to the original description. A basic entry of a taxon name follows the AnimalBase standard, which is composed of the following guidelines:

- The correct original spelling of the generic and specific name is checked according to the nomenclatural rules (ICZN Code, current edition).
- Specific names are strictly entered in combination with the genus to which they were attributed in the original description. In cases where the generic name was spelled incorrectly by the author who established the specific name, the AnimalBase Team combines the specific name with the correct spelling of that genus.
- Contingently incorrect original spellings of the taxon name (i.e. being different from the correct spelling) are entered in addition, retaining the original use of diacritics, ligations, upper-case letters for specific names, hyphens, spaces between words, incorrect subsequent spellings of the generic name in a genus-species combination used by the author.
- The name of the author is provided, spelled according to the name given on the title page of the original source (examples: Linnæus 1758, Linné 1766).
- The year or date of publication is provided, as determined by the nomenclatural rules (true date of publication).
- The gender treatment is provided (changeable or unchangeable specific names, according to post-classical Latin grammar rules). It is often difficult to determine whether a Latin name is an adjective or not, so resulting AnimalBase entries of this data may not be 100% reliable.
- A link to the digitized publication containing the original description is provided.
- The page of the original description of the taxon name is provided (which is the page where the name was first mentioned and made available). If the described animal is shown on figure plates and without a name mentioned on the plates, this is not necessarily indicated.
- The type locality is provided as given in the original description if it is easily recognizable or can be inferred implicitly from the work. This procedure may be inaccurate (because the type locality is the locality where the name-bearing types came from, which are not researched by the AnimalBase team), but certainly provides useful information.
- The higher animal group in which the taxon is classified is provided (phylum, class, order or likewise clade).
- Entries are cross-checked with Index Animalium and (in case of genera) with Nomenclator Zoologicus. Incorrect entries (subsequent uses of previously established names, which Sherborn often listed incorrectly as new or nomina nuda) and incorrect spellings of names in these databases are not copied into AnimalBase, if detected as such.
- Incorrect subsequent spellings are not generally considered as new taxa, but may be listed as not available and discussed if the name was mentioned as a new name in the Index Animalium or is otherwise important.
- All animal groups are treated consistently by following the ICZN rules (fish names follow the same rules as insect names).

The AnimalBase standard allows for easy access to the primary data of the original description. The AnimalBase team does not align the spellings or authorship of each originally established name with those contained in various zoological databases, specialized by discipline or region. The primarily scope of AnimalBase is to provide links to the digitized original descriptions, but it can also be consulted for correct spellings and authorships of zoological names. In this regard, AnimalBase may potentially provide a useful update of Sherborn's Index Animalium.

AnimalBase also provides the option to combine the original names with their current allocations (current genus-species combinations). For example, detailed biological information and pictures are available for 2,500 species of European non-marine molluscs, which includes more than 6,000 photographs. AnimalBase is a collaborative and open resource project; all registered collaborators are able to correct or enter data. This includes uploading pictures (copyright-free) of animal species, biological data including measurements and diagnostic characters, distributional data, the current conservation status, etc. The pictures and data provided by AnimalBase are expressly permitted for use on other websites (copied or linked).
