= Oronzio Gabriele Costa =

Italian zoologist (1787–1867)

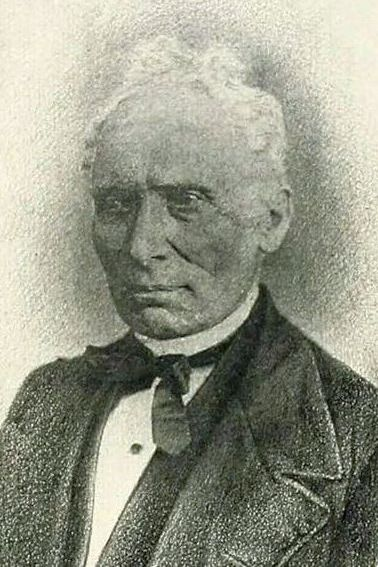
Oronzo Gabriele Costa

Oronzo Gabriele Costa (26 August 1787, Alessano – 7 November 1867 Naples) was an Italian zoologist.

At first a physician, he taught zoology at the University of Naples. He wrote 126 papers on various subjects, principally entomology, and in 1846 served as president of the Accademia Pontaniana in Naples.

His two sons, Achille Costa (1823–1899) and Giuseppe Costa, were also both well-known zoologists.

== Publications ==
There has been a good deal of confusion over the publication details of his most important work, the Fauna del Regno di Napoli (full title: Fauna del Regno di Napoli, ossia, enumerazione di tutti gli animali che abitano le diverse regioni di questo regno e le acque che le bagnano), published over a long period of time, including posthumously, in collaboration with his son, Achille Costa. Taeger and Blank (1996; p. 253) state that for some of the work, Oronzio was merely the editor, Achille being the actual author, whose name appears on the title page.

- Fauna Vesuviana (1827).
- Fauna di Aspromonte (1828).
- Fauna del Regno di Napoli 1829 – 1886 (continued after his death by Achille Costa)

== Bibliography ==
- Baker, D.B. (October 1994). "The dates of the Hymenoptera sections of Costa's Fauna del Regno di Napoli". Archives of Natural History. 21 (3): 351–356. doi:10.3366/anh.1994.21.3.351.
- Ruggiero, L. (February 2002). "Some notes about the publishing history of Oronzo Gabriele Costa's". Archives of Natural History. 29 (1): 67–71. doi:10.3366/anh.2002.29.1.67.
- Sherborn, C. Davies (January 1910). "On the dates of Publication of Costa's 'Fauna del Regno di Napoli,' 1829–1886". Journal of Natural History. Series 8. 5 (25): 132. doi:10.1080/00222931008692738.
- Taeger, Andreas; Blank, Stephan M (12 September 1996). "Kommentare zur Taxonomie der Symphyta (Hymenoptera): Vorarbeiten zu einem Katalog der Pflanzenwespen, Teil 1". Beiträge zur Entomologie. 46 (2). Berlin: 251–275.
