= Society for the History of Natural History =

The Society for the History of Natural History (SHNH) is an international society for everyone who is interested in natural history in the broadest sense. This includes botany, zoology and geology as well as natural history collections, exploration, art and bibliography. Everyone with an interest in these subjects – professional or amateur – is welcome to join. The Society's Patron is Sir David Attenborough OM CH FRS.

Originally named the Society for the Bibliography of Natural History, SHNH was founded in 1936 by a small group of distinguished scientists, librarians and bibliographers whose appreciation and love of books inspired the formation of the Society in London. The Society's first President was Charles Davies Sherborn (1861–1942), who compiled the Index Animalium single-handedly over 43 years (1758–1850). This 11 volume, 9,000 page work, that catalogued 444,000 names of every living and extinct animal discovered between 1758 and 1850 is considered to be the bibliographic foundation for zoological nomenclature.

The Society's main publication is Archives of Natural History which is published for the Society by Edinburgh University Press. Archives of Natural History provides an avenue for the publication of papers on the history and bibliography of natural history in its broadest sense, and in all periods and all cultures. This includes botany, geology, palaeontology and zoology, the lives of naturalists, their publications, correspondence and collections, and the institutions and societies that have promoted the study and documentation of the natural world. Bibliographical papers concerned with the study of rare books, manuscripts and illustrative material, and analytical and enumerative bibliographies are also published. From time to time, the Society also publishes other works of interest, the most recent being Darwin in the Archives. An informal Newsletter is also circulated to all members where news, information about Society events or other meetings of interest, and notes and queries from members can be found.

The Society holds a regular series of meetings on all aspects of the history of natural history. These range from short evening meetings to international conferences taking place over several days with associated visits. It holds an annual "Spring Meeting" incorporating the Annual General Meeting at which Council members of the Society are elected, accounts presented, and medals and awards are announced. Its meetings are seen as an important contribution to forging links between all those working in the history of natural history, leading to lasting collaborations and friendships across national and international boundaries.

The Society is a registered charity under English law. Registered charity no. 210355.

== Medals and prizes ==
The Society seeks to promote the objectives for which it was founded by making awards for excellence in the fields of the history and bibliography of natural history. Full details of these awards can be found in Schedule 2 associated with the Society's Byelaws.

The following medals and prizes are awarded by the Society for the History of Natural History:

- The SHNH Founders' Medal is awarded to persons who have made a substantial contribution to the study of the history or bibliography of natural history. More than one medal can be awarded in any given year.
- The SHNH Book Prize and John Thackray Medal was instituted in 2000 to commemorate the life and work of John Thackray, Past President of the Society. This prize is awarded for the best book published on the history or bibliography of natural history in the preceding two years.
- The SHNH President's Award was instituted in 2021.The award recognises an individual or team’s contribution and impact in promoting and improving accessibility, inclusivity and diversity to the study of the history of natural history.
- The SHNH Patron's Prize was instituted in 2011, whereby an outstanding young scholar, nominated by Council, is invited by the Society’s Patron to write a review that advances the Society's objects, namely “the historical and bibliographical study of the growth of all branches of natural history in all periods and cultures”. The current patron of SHNH is Sir David Attenborough OM CH FRS.
- The SHNH William T. Stearn Student Essay Prize was instituted in 2007 to commemorate the work of late William T. Stearn, a scholar whose work contributed much to the field of botany and to the Society. The prize is awarded to the best original, unpublished essay in the history of natural history. The competition is open to undergraduate and postgraduate students in full- or part-time education, or within 3 years of completing their degree. The essay is usually published as a paper in the Society's peer-reviewed journal Archives of Natural History, the winner also receives a cash prize and free membership of the Society for a year.

== Presidents ==
- Gina Douglas 2021-present
- Peter Davis 2018-2021
- Arthur MacGregor 2015–2018
- Hugh Torrens 2012–2015
- P. Geoffrey Moore 2009–2012
- Arthur Lucas (academic) 2006–2009
- J. Cain 2003–2006
- John Edwards 2000–2003
- John C. Thackray-1999
- W. D. Ian. Rolfe 1996–1999
- David Mabberley 1993–1996
- Rex E. R. Banks 1990–1993
- A. C. Wheeler 1987–1990
- Sir Eric Smith 1984–1987
- H. W. Ball 1981–1984
- D. E. Allen 1978–1981
- R. G. C. Desmond 1975–1978
- C. K. Swann 1972–1975
- John Ramsbottom 1943–1972
- Charles Davies Sherborn 1936–1942

== Bibliography ==
- Hemming, F. (1943). The development of the Society for the Bibliography of Natural History in the first six years of its existence. JSBNH 1: xi–xvi. [issued with Part 12, 1943].
- Wheeler, Alwyne C. (2006). The Society for the Bibliography of Natural History. An account of its formation and activities. Archives of Natural History 33 (2):365–367. doi:10.3366/anh.2006.33.2.365
- Stearn, W. T. (October 2007) [1986]. "Society for the Bibliography of Natural History, later the Society for the History of Natural History, 1936–1985. A quinquagenary record". Archives of Natural History. 34 (2): 379–396 (sup. 1–15). doi:10.3366/anh.2007.34.2.379.
