= Archives of Natural History =

- Discipline: Natural history, history of sciences
- Language: English
- Edited by: Dr. Anne Secord

Publication details
- Former name(s): Journal of the Society for the Bibliography of Natural History
- History: 1936–present
- Publisher: Edinburgh University Press, for the Society for the History of Natural History (United Kingdom)
- Frequency: Semiannual

Standard abbreviations
- ISO 4: Arch. Nat. Hist.

Indexing
- ISSN: 0260-9541 (print); 1755-6260 (web)
- OCLC no.: 7989535

Links
- Journal homepage; Online access

The Archives of Natural History (formerly the Journal of the Society for the Bibliography of Natural History) is a peer-reviewed academic journal and the official journal of the Society for the History of Natural History. It publishes papers on the history and bibliography of natural history in its broadest sense, and in all periods and all cultures. This includes botany, geology, palaeontology and zoology, the lives of naturalists, their publications, correspondence and collections, and the institutions and societies to which they belong. Bibliographical papers concerned with the study of rare books, manuscripts and illustrative material, and analytical and enumerative bibliographies are also published.

The Archives of Natural History was established in 1936 as the Journal of the Society for the Bibliography of Natural History, adopting its current title of Archives of Natural History in 1981. Archives of Natural History has been published for the Society by Edinburgh University Press since 2008.
