= Sherborne Sensors =

- Industry: Measurement Instrumentation
- Founded: 2002
- Headquarters: 1 Ringway Centre, Edison Road, Basingstoke, Hampshire, RG21 6YH, United Kingdom
- Key people: Andy Penfold, Gary Gates,
- Products: Inclinometers, Accelerometers and Load Cells
- Website: Sherborne Sensors the load cell superstore

Sherborne Sensors is a designer and manufacturer of precision inclinometers, accelerometers and load cells. Technologies utilized include mechanical servo, solid state and strain gauge. These precision measurement tools are available as both off-the-shelf and bespoke for use in military, aerospace, civil and industrial engineering applications.

Sherborne Sensors is based in ‘transducer valley’ in Hampshire, UK, and supplies its products to over 50 countries across the world.

Many of the inertial products currently offered have evolved from the Schaevitz brand that innovated sensor design during the 1940s and 1950s. The current LSOC/LSOP range of Linear Servo Inclinometers originate from the genuine Schaevitz units. The Force Transducers have their roots with the Maywood brand founded in the 1970s.

== History ==
Sherborne Sensors began life in 1945 as Schaevitz Engineering, a New Jersey–based manufacturer of LVDTs and other precision sensors. The business operated solely in the United States until an association formed with Electro-Mechanisms (EM) in 1963. This allowed their products to be distributed in the UK and also to be manufactured under licence.

Prompted by the success overseas, Schaevitz Engineering acquired the majority shareholding in EM and began manufacturing a UK range of inertial products in 1974.

The Schaevitz name traded until 1986 when the company was acquired by Lucas who changed the name of the business to Lucas Control Systems.

In 1997 the company became Lucas Varty [sic] and in 1999 was acquired by TRW.

This business model continued until August 2000 when the Schaevitz Sensors and Components division of TRW was acquired by Measurement Specialities Inc (MSI). In 2002 the Measurement Specialties UK group was put into financial receivership and its assets sold. A group of former Schaevitz employees purchased the Inertial Products Division from MSI and formed the Sherborne Sensors Limited Company in July 2002 thus continuing the design, development and manufacture of precision sensors.

In 2007, Sherborne Sensors extended its product range beyond inertial sensors by obtaining the former Maywood Instruments force transducer product lines and intellectual property from FTSA Holdings Limited.

Following this expansion, Sherborne Sensors has extended its operation globally, establishing a sales and stocking location in North American in 2009.

2012 NOVA METRIX LLC, Woburn MA, acquires Sherborne Sensors Ltd.
