= Sherborne House =

Sherborne House is the name of more than one house in Britain. It may refer to:

- Sherborne House, Dorset
- Sherborne House, Gloucestershire
