= Sherbourne Street =

Sherbourne Street may refer to:

- Sherbourne Street, Suffolk, England
- Sherbourne Street, Toronto, one of the first streets in Toronto, Ontario, Canada
