= Charles Davies Sherborn =

English bibliographer (1861–1942)

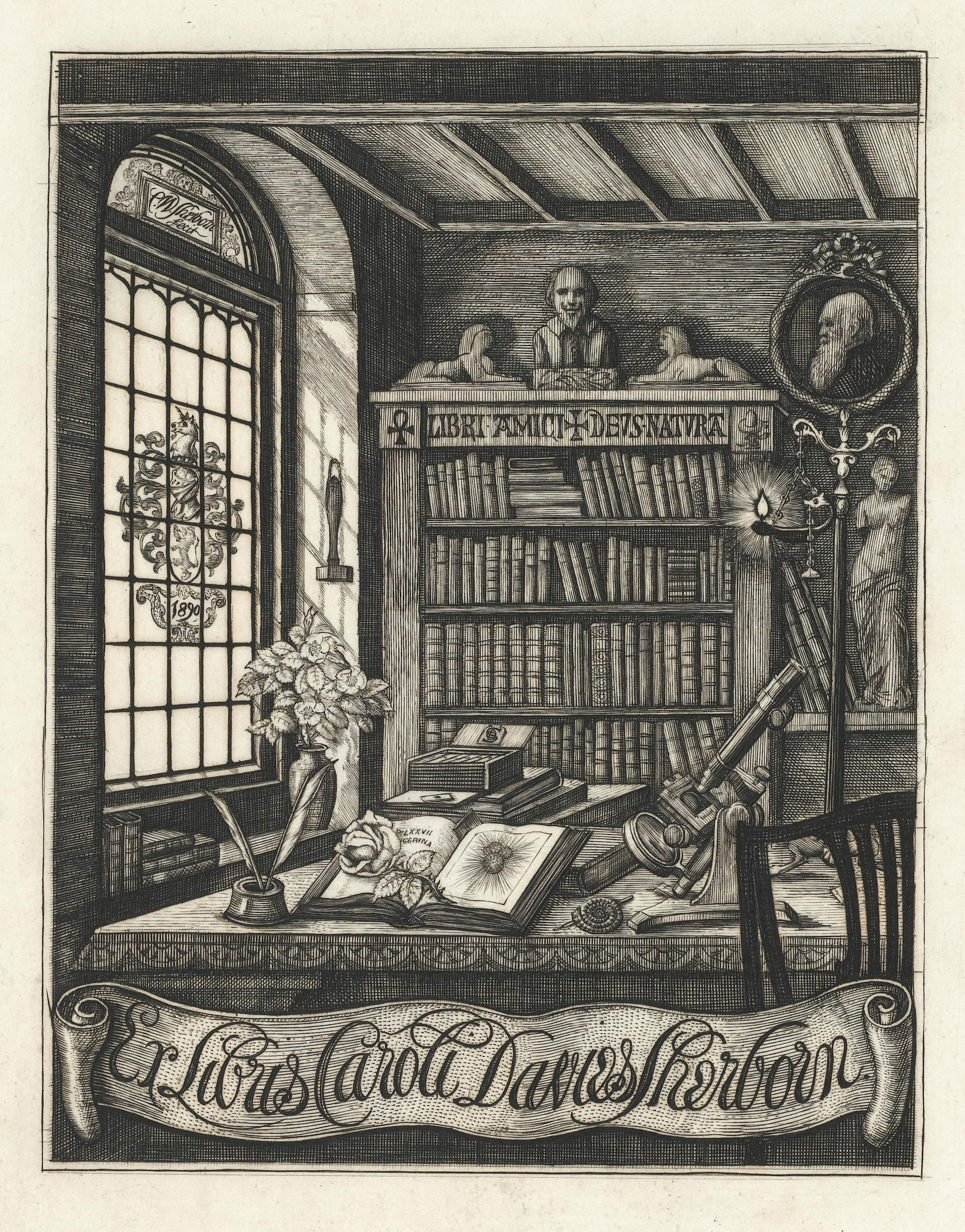
Sherborn's bookplate, engraved by his father.

Charles Davies Sherborn (30 June 1861 – 22 June 1942) was an English bibliographer, paleontologist and geologist. His magnum opus was the compilation of the Index Animalium, an 11-volume, 9,000-page work that catalogued the 444,000 names of every living and extinct animal discovered between 1758 and 1850. This work is considered the bibliographic foundation for zoological nomenclature. In addition, Sherborn authored almost 200 books, papers, and catalogs on a wide variety of topics in natural history. He made important contributions to the study of microfossils and was a founding member and first president of the Society for the Bibliography of Natural History. In recognition of his endeavours he was awarded an Honorary Doctorate from Oxford University.

== Early life ==
Sherborn was the eldest son of Charles William Sherborn, a Chelsea engraver of some renown, and Hannah Sherborn (née Simpson). As a youth he was an enthusiastic collector of rocks, fossils, and freshwater shells. His father ran into difficulties in business which forced him to quit studies at 14 and seek work. For the next several years he worked in the book trade at a bookshop on Bond Street followed by work as a clerk in a tailoring shop. During his spare time he studied at the Museum of Practical Geology and read at the library of the Victoria and Albert Museum.

Sherborn was a descendant of the Sherborn family who had owned Fawns Manor in Bedfont since the 17th century. In the course of researching his family history, he came into contact with William Sherborn, his fourth cousin once removed, still in possession of the Manor, and on William's death in 1912 (the same year as Charles William Sherborn's death, making Charles Davies Sherborn the rightful inheritor) came into ownership of the Manor, although he never took up residence there, preferring to remain in Fulham. On Charles Davies Sherborn's own death in 1942, the Manor was inherited by his nephew Ronald Thorne Sherborn, father of the conservationist Derek Sherborn.

== Geology ==
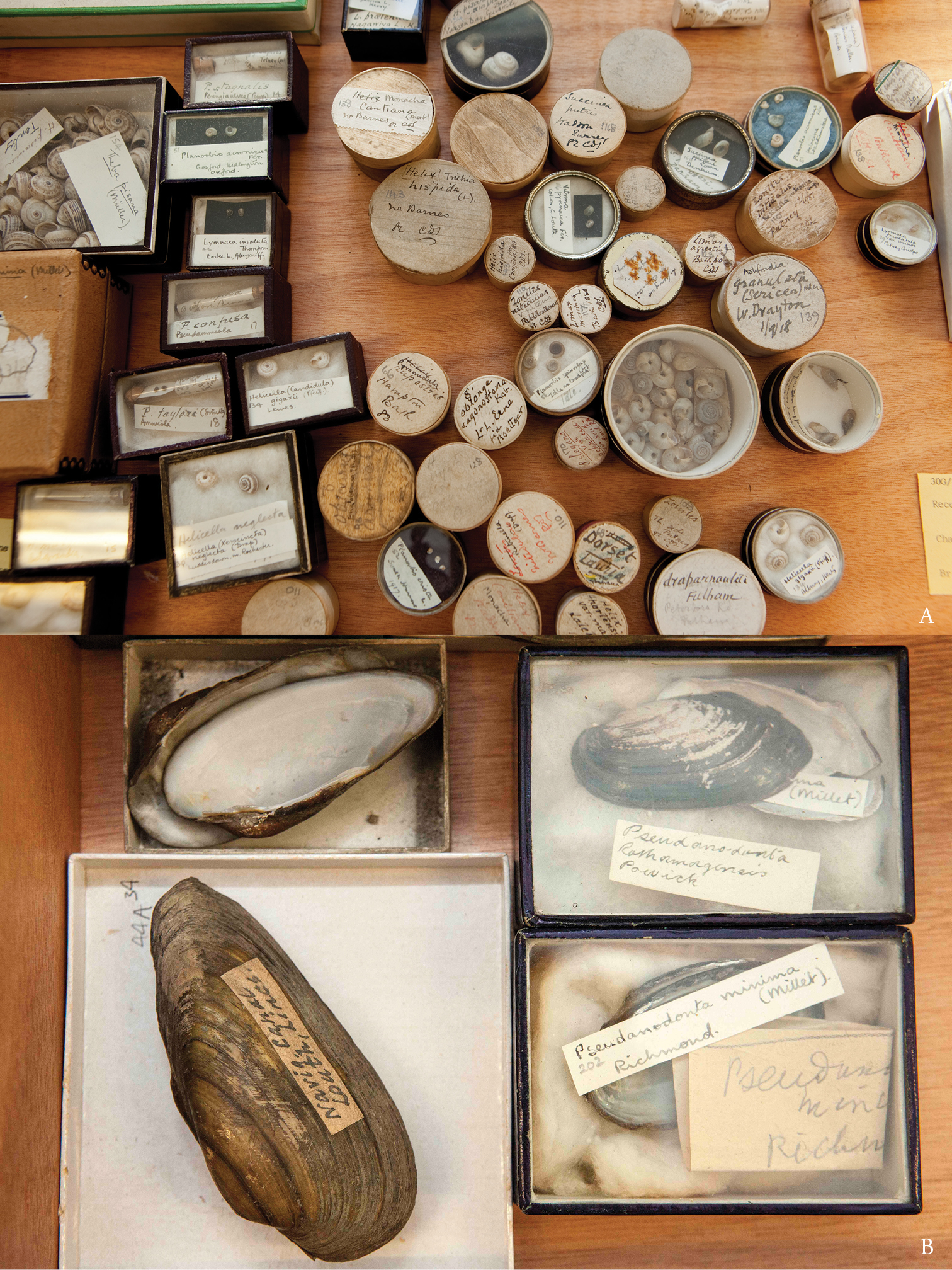
A sample of Sherborn's mollusc collection at the Natural History Museum

Sherborn developed a passionate interest in geology and paleontology and in 1883 he was asked by geologist Thomas Rupert Jones to help illustrate and complete some papers he was writing on fossil Foraminifera. Jones was to become a close colleague and mentor for Sherborn. By 1887, they had published three papers, with Sherborn providing the illustrations. Challenged by the great number of journals they had to consult in preparing their papers, Sherborn began to compile his first bibliography, A Bibliography of the Foraminifera, published in 1888. Around this time he was hired by the Geology department at the Natural History Museum to clean and prepare fossils. His pay was based on the number of fossils he prepared. In this new role he had the opportunity to collaborate with Arthur Smith Woodward, an expert on fossil fish and another influential colleague in Sherborn's career.

== Bibliography ==
Encouraged by the success of his first bibliography, Sherborn began to contemplate a much more ambitious project—the indexing of every living and extinct animal species discovered since 1758. The scope of what he was proposing may not have been apparent at first; initially he had planned to end the index at 1899. Even after scaling back to 1850, the task before him was immense. He began working on his Index Animalium in 1890. During the day he continued to prepare fossils in the museum while at night he would work at home, methodically going through thousands of books and journals, recording onto slips of paper every species name he came across. In just the first year he reviewed 500 scientific references and recorded about 40,000 names. By the time he was done he had reviewed thousands of books and journals in multiple languages and had created over a million handwritten records. Just sorting the records into alphabetic order took over three years. The first volume was published in 1902 and covered the time period 1758-1800. Covering the next 50 years required another 10 volumes (a measure of the explosive growth of scientific knowledge) and wasn't completed until 1932.

In 1892 Sherborn was invited by Reverend Richard Startin Owen to assist on a biography of his grandfather, Richard Owen, founder of the Natural History Museum and one of the most famous scientists of his era. He was required to sort through Owen's papers, which had been left, in piles twelve feet high, in a cowshed exposed to rats and to the elements. Despite Sherborn's great pleasure in the task, the effort involved caused a breakdown in his health that left him nearly incapacitated for three years. Nevertheless, Sherborn succeeded with the enormous task, sorting and distributing hundreds of scientific papers and thousands of pages of correspondence.

Sherborn enjoyed bringing his colleagues together for his famous "smoke and chat" parties at his home. These were usually all-male, informal affairs and guests included museum staff as well as personal friends. He never married; although engaged for ten years, he concluded that his sporadic income would be insufficient to provide for a wife and family.
