= Derek Sherborn =

British conservationist

- Born: 7 May 1924; Streatham
- Died: 4 July 2004 (aged 80)
- Occupation: Conservationist

Derek Ronald Sherborn (7 May 1924 – 4 July 2004) was a British conservationist and Principal Investigator of historic buildings for the Ministry of Town and Country Planning, who played a major role in the rescue of historical properties, making a pioneering contribution to the preservation of England's architectural heritage.

== Biography ==
The only child of Ronald Thorne Sherborn, a Fellow of the Zoological Society of London, amateur photographer and draughtsman, and his wife Evelyn May (née Allman), Sherborn was born and raised in Streatham, a descendant of the Sherborn family of Bedfont, Lords of the Manors of Fawns and Cockbell, first recorded in the person of John Sherborn, of Feltham, who appeared in the Middlesex Muster Rolls for Foot Soldiers in 1338 as being required to serve with a bow and arrow. The family had been settled at Bedfont since the 14th century. In his youth, Sherborn was a collector of coins, stamps and Roman pottery, and his enthusiasm for history led him to attend auctions.

After Streatham Grammar School, Sherborn joined the R.A.F. Upon his discharge in 1944, Sherborn's interest in architecture led him to survey all the old buildings of Reading. This study qualified him, in 1948, for a position with the newly formed Ministry of Town and County Planning, as an investigator of historic buildings. The work, poorly paid and solitary, was nonetheless his true vocation given his great passion for conservation; given the damage and neglect of wartime and heavy cost in death duties, many formerly great estates were imperiled. He was a Fellow of the Society of Antiquaries.

Although numerous houses of distinction were lost, Sherborn's diligence and effort led to successful rescues of houses such as Calke Abbey, Derbyshire; Lydiard House, at Lydiard Tregoze, Wiltshire; and Cowick Hall in Yorkshire. His 1951 list of 2,000 outstanding country houses for the Gower Report led to the creation, in 1953, of the Historic Buildings Council for England, Wales and Scotland. By 1978, Sherborn was the Ministry's Principal Inspector, on the Listing Committee, Ecclesiastical Buildings Committee and the Outstanding Buildings Committee of the Historic Buildings Council. He retired in 1982.

Fawns Manor in Bedfont ('in the unlikely depths of suburban Middlesex'), in the ownership of the Sherborns since the 15th century, was inherited by Sherborn's uncle, the taxonomist Charles Davies Sherborn on the death of his fourth cousin once-removed, William Sherborn, in 1912. When Charles Davies Sherborn died in 1942, the Manor came to Ronald Thorne Sherborn; the family took up residence in the restored house in 1950. Sherborn lived there after his father's death until 1983, when, following several burglaries, he sold the manor to the British Airways Housing Association and moved to a seafront villa in Brighton. He died in 2004, having published his memoirs, An Inspector Recalls, the previous year. In his Spectator review of the book, Hugh Massingberd noted Sherborn to be 'one of the unsung heroes of conservation' in Britain, and observed that 'the so-called "national heritage" thus owes Sherborn an immeasurable debt' in light of his efforts.
