= Bedfont =

Suburb in the London Borough of Hounslow, England

Coordinates: 51.450°N 0.440°W

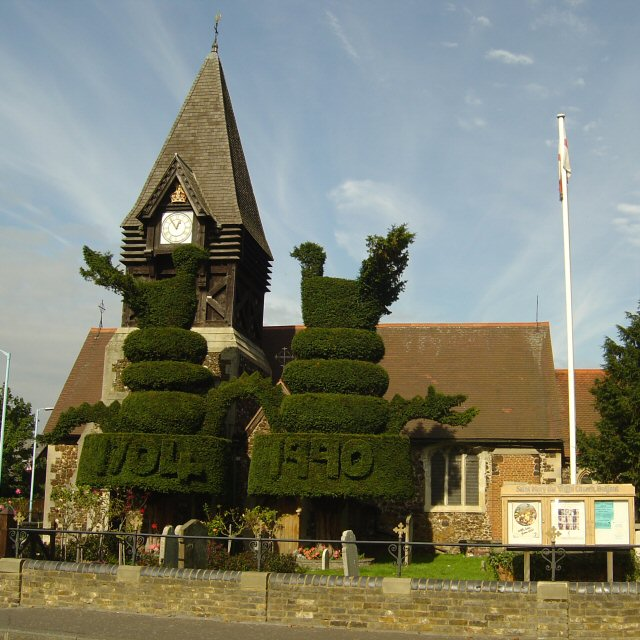
- The medieval Church of St Mary the Virgin has had its yew tree topiary from 1704

- Location within Greater London
- Area: 4.45 km^{2} (1.72 sq mi)
- Population: 12,701 ( Bedfont wards 2011)
  - Density: 2,854/km^{2} (7,390/sq mi)
- OS grid reference: TQ0873
- Civil parish: n/a
- London borough: Hounslow
- Ceremonial county: Greater London
- Region: London
- Country: England
- Sovereign state: United Kingdom
- Post town: FELTHAM
- Postcode district: TW14
- Dialling code: 020
- Police: Metropolitan
- Fire: London
- Ambulance: London
- UK Parliament: Feltham and Heston
- London Assembly: South West

Bedfont is a suburb in the London Borough of Hounslow, approximately 15 miles (24 km) west of Charing Cross. Originally a distinct village, Bedfont has a large central conservation area around Bedfont Green. The majority of the housing was built at a time of an emerging economy of aviation and distribution-related businesses. The area was formerly part of the Staines Rural District and was one of the formerly agricultural areas chosen for significant low-rise social housing, planned and built in the mid 20th century.

Bedfont straddles Staines Road (A315) and traditionally includes North Feltham north of Staines Road – a mainly commercial area – and the neighbourhood of Hatton. The heart of the area has many parks and the south-eastern streets and Cage Park are contiguous with the larger district of Feltham. East is the River Crane around which are a few remaining parts of Hounslow Heath.

The nearest railway station is at Feltham and the area adjoins the Hatton Cross Underground station on the Piccadilly line. Heathrow Airport is 2 miles (3 km) to the north.

== Etymology ==
A typical list of evolving Middle English orthography follows the Domesday Book's "Bedefunde" (1086). All forms confirm two components, the first unclear and the latter certain (in meaning). In the most orthodox Old English language (Old English), a tongue relatively little-written and standardised, funta or funde means spring or small pool.

- Bed could be an intuitive idea of the village water source lying in a bed. All of the land is gravel terraces which rise gently to the north and fall to the south with a rare natural spring and small ponds, some medieval, all removed near the centre.
- Bed is close to at least one known proper name (noun), Bede. The natural spring here suggests an Anglo-Saxon proper village pre-dating the 10th century monastic cult of Bede. However, Bed has a standard personal tribe/following '-ing' prefix in Beddington a dozen miles to the east.
- An obscure, longer Germanic noun is Byden, a type of drinking-vessel, a potential root.

== History ==
=== Origins and Medieval Bedfont ===
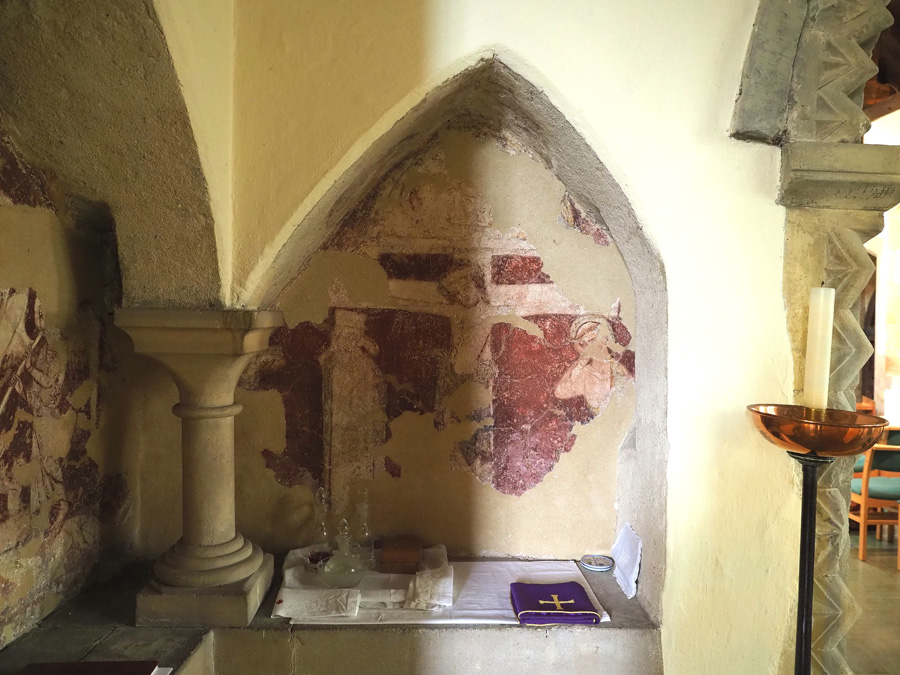
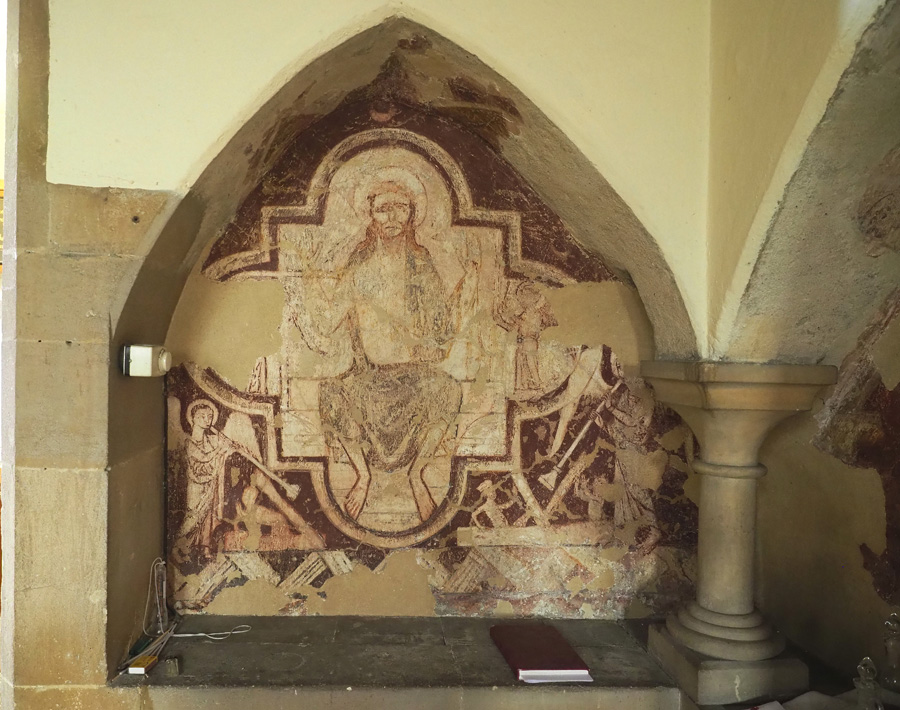
Medieval wall paintings in the chancel of St Mary's church

Excavations before the building of Heathrow's Terminal 5 site (2 miles (3.2 km) north-west) found evidence of settlement during the Bronze Age, Iron Age and Roman periods, suggesting there may have been people living in and around the Bedfont area during these periods. However much of the parish soil was unworkable by the till, a large stony heath after which Hatton is named, Hounslow Heath, some turned into Bedfont Powder Mills by the 19th century in North Feltham and later industry/storage buildings.

The obsolete locality name of West Bedfont mainly lies around Long Lane in the parish (area) of neighbouring Stanwell. It once had a small chapel. Its casting off from the rest of the parish and new allegiance to Stanwell church occurred at some point in its descent of the manor in the 12th century. Larger East Bedfont, on the Greater London side of the boundary, has fallen again a little in size and developed into modern-day Bedfont: in the early 20th century some land was given over to Ashford. Later a swathe of Hatton's extent (its manor and its devolved estates) became North Feltham and a similar swathe the east of Heathrow airport. Hatton remains part of Bedfont in the Anglican community

The Parish Church of St Mary the Virgin is on the edge of the village green and is the oldest surviving church in the borough dating from around 1150. Its Norman chancel, chancel arch and south doorway have survived the centuries, as have medieval wall paintings from the mid 13th century, which were uncovered in 1865.

=== Manors ===
The Domesday Book has an entry stating that the manors of Bedfont, Hatton and Stanwell were all held by William Fitz Other. From the early 14th century the Manor of East Bedfont was held by the Trinitarian Priory of Hounslow, before being taken by the Crown during the reformation. The Berkeley family of Cranford then held the manor before selling it to the Earl of Northumberland in 1656. Pates Manor, architecturally a Grade II listed building also in Bedfont, was held by the Page family, a branch of the Pages of Harrow on the Hill. Col. John Page, a member of the family, became a wealthy Virginia merchant who served on the colonial council.

=== The growth of the town and industrialisation ===
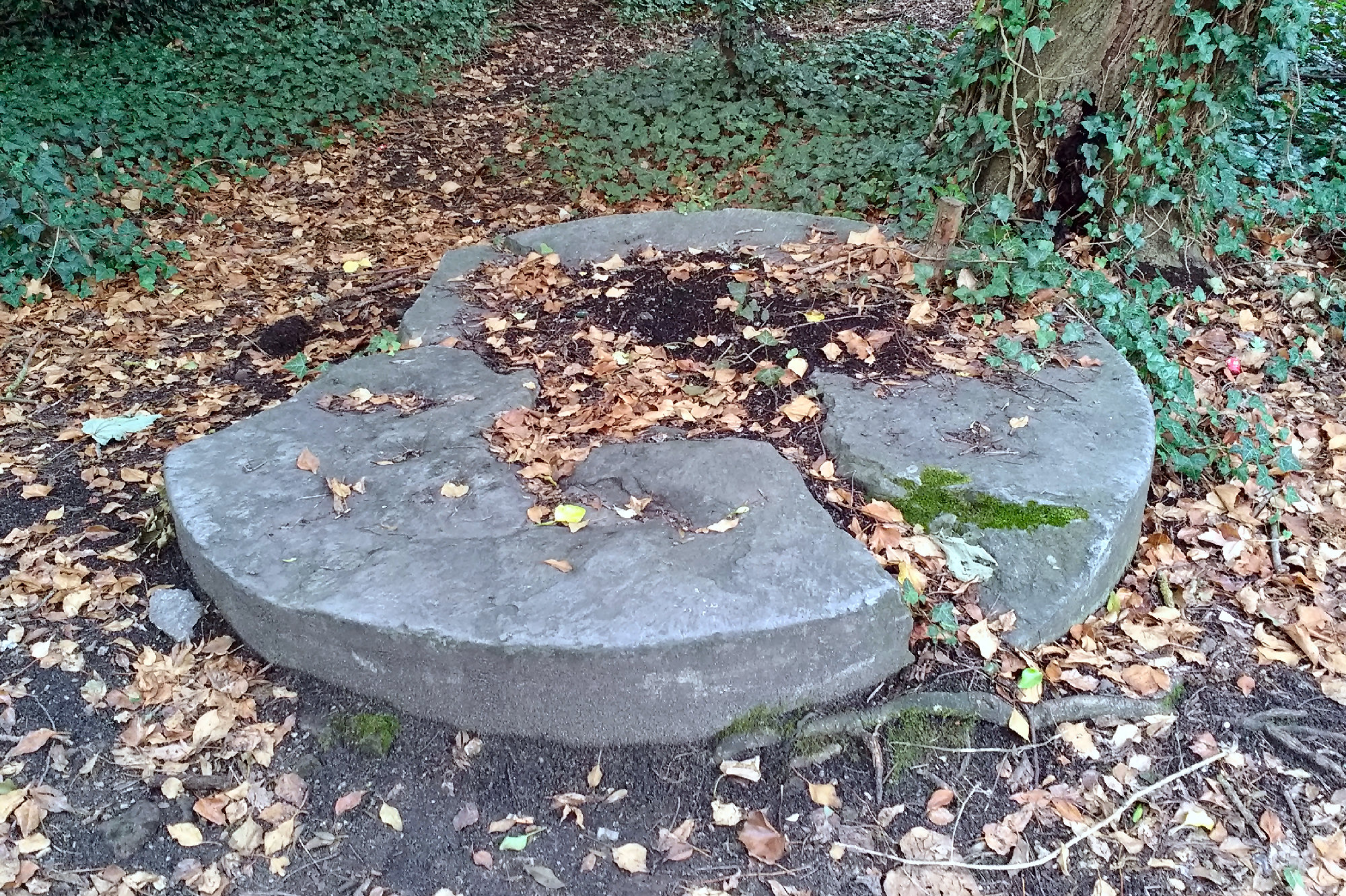
Remains of a millstone from Bedfont Powder Mills

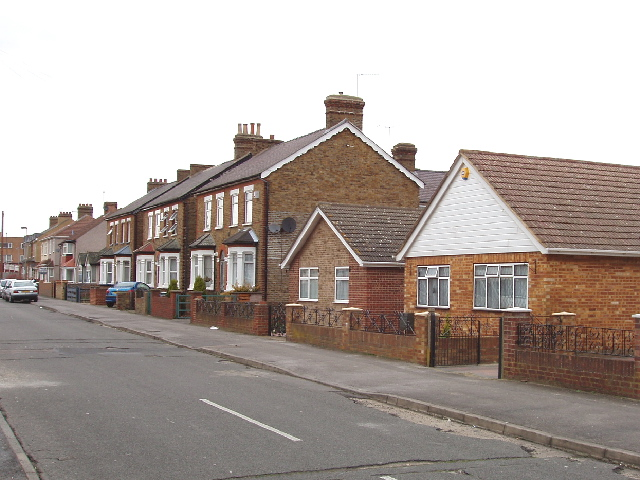
Street of semi-detached homes and bungalows built, like most of the area, in the 19th and 20th centuries

Charles I licensed the Hounslow Sword Mill in 1630 on the banks of the Duke of Northumberland's River. The sword smiths, who came from Solingen in Germany, produced one thousand swords a month, which have become collector's items and an impressive collection of these can be seen at the Gunnersbury Park Museum. There is also one on display at Warwick University.

The Longford River, which also flows through Bedfont, also dates from the reign of Charles I.

During the English Civil War, when both the Royalist and Parliamentary armies passed through Bedfont, the mill was taken by Parliamentary forces, and was converted to a gunpowder mill in 1654.

This converted mill was supplemented by new mills closer to Baber Bridge, in the area now known as Donkey Woods. The manufacture of gunpowder was a dangerous occupation and workers were killed or maimed in many explosions down the years, with the mills being demolished and rebuilt a number of times. The water-powered gunpowder mills continued to be used until 1926 when they were closed by the then owners, Imperial Chemical Industries.

After the railway heyday the twentieth century saw motor cars take en masse to the old arterial coaching route and so prompted the Great South West Road in 1925 skirting the bulk of Bedfont south of today's airport and much of Hounslow in a decade when the Bath Road, which branches off, was also improved.

=== Postwar development and the construction of Heathrow ===
By 1946 another form of transport began to impact on the village when Heathrow Airport opened and became the largest employer in the area, with the effect of increasing the demand for local housing. The village of Heathrow was lost, as was some of the hamlet of Hatton. This sits beneath the airport's flight path, but The Green Man public house survives from around the 16th century together with a few period properties near the pub and London Underground station on the edge of the airport.

In the late 1950s, the National Physical Laboratory commenced the construction of a new ship testing tank in Faggs Lane, to augment the existing facilities at Teddington. The new facility was opened by Prince Philip, Duke of Edinburgh, on 13th October 1959. The site was sold off after 1985 and the buildings demolished, to be replaced by a supermarket.

== Buildings of interest ==
=== Pates and Fawns Manor Houses ===
Bedfont has the rare status for a metropolitan traditional area (an old parish) in the UK to have two surviving manor houses: Pates, once owned by the Page family is behind the church, the oldest house in the Borough – one wing dates to the late 15th century. Fawns, on the south side of the Green, dates from the 16th century and was sold to the British Airways Housing Association in 1983 by Derek Sherborn of the family who had owned it from the 17th century.

=== Former coaching inns ===
As population and coach services grew from the 17th to 18th centuries the number of inns in Bedfont grew to at least six. The Duke’s Head and The Bell were on Bedfont Green, and The Plough, The Sun, The White Horse and the Queen’s Head joined them in providing stabling and refreshments to the weary travellers and goods distributors on the road between London and much of Hampshire and the South West. The sole survivor is the Bell, now known as The Bell on the Green.

=== Parish church of St Mary ===
St Mary's church, the parish church of Bedfont, is of unknown foundation, although it retains its original Norman chancel and arch. There are wall paintings of Christ on the Cross and Christ in Glory, of about 1250 to the north of the arch. They were uncovered in 1865. In 1829, the church was enlarged, and there is a plaque in the porch commemorating this. In 1865 the original wooden tower and spire were removed and the nave lengthened. A new tower, spire, porch, and chancel doorway were built. The tower clock is of uncertain date: it may have been installed to commemorate Queen Victoria's Diamond Jubilee (1897) or King Edward VII's coronation (1902). The church is a Grade II listed building.

The church is famous for the two yew trees in the churchyard, which are referred to as the 'yew trees into peacocks shorn' in a poem by George Colman the Elder, a friend of the actor-manager David Garrick. They were also the subject of Thomas Hood's poem 'The Two Peacocks of Bedfont'. The local legend is that 'two overbearing damsels . . dismissed a suitor with such contempt that in revenge he had the trees trimmed to typify them as two proud and haughty peacocks' and they were for two centuries the pride of the village. For a time they were not maintained but they were recreated in 1990 at the initiative of the chairman of Princes Sporting Club, David Spyer, who remembered in the early 50's being told about Hood's poem. In later years, on becoming interested in topiary work, he recalled the history of the trees and went to look at them. In discussion with the then vicar, he learnt that the local authority had given permission for them to be truncated, it was difficult to find anyone who could advise him on restoration of these trees. Eventually he was advised of a Dutch topiarist. Funds were raised from the local Bank and SGB supplied scaffolding and the Dutchmen came over and stayed with local parishioners, this happened over a three years until the trees began to take shape, they were then maintained by a local gardener, the dates '1704 – 1990' were then trained into the trees.

== Bypassing of the local roads ==
The building of the Great Western Railway between London and Bristol in 1841 marked the beginning of the end for the golden age of the stagecoach, and by 1847 stage and mail coaches had ceased to run to the west. The Waterloo to Staines line opened in 1848. It skirts the far south-west of the parish. For a few decades this left the roads less used by long-distance traffic. After the motorway network was built, this situation resumed

== Politics ==
Bedfont is part of the Feltham and Heston constituency for elections to the House of Commons of the United Kingdom.

Bedfont is part of the Bedfont ward for elections to Hounslow London Borough Council.

== Sport ==
Captain Matthew Webb, who was the first man to swim the English Channel (25 August 1875), lived in The Limes, New Road, Bedfont from 1880 until 1883 when he died attempting to swim the rapids below the Niagara Falls.

Bedfont has three Non-League football teams :

- Bedfont F.C. play at The Orchard ground very close to the ground of Bedfont Sports and a former nursery of Hugh Ronalds'.
- Bedfont Sports F.C. play at the Bedfont Sports Recreation Ground.
- FC Deportivo Galicia groundshare with Bedfont Sports F.C. at the Bedfont Sports Recreation Ground.

== Demography and housing ==
2011 Census Homes
Ward	Detached	Semi-detached	Terraced	Flats and apartments	Caravans/temporary/mobile homes/houseboats	Shared between households
(ward)	220	2,065	1,007	1,562	3	2

2011 Census Households
Ward	Population	Households	% Owned outright	% Owned with a loan	hectares
(ward)	12.701	4,859	18	30.2	445

== Gallery ==
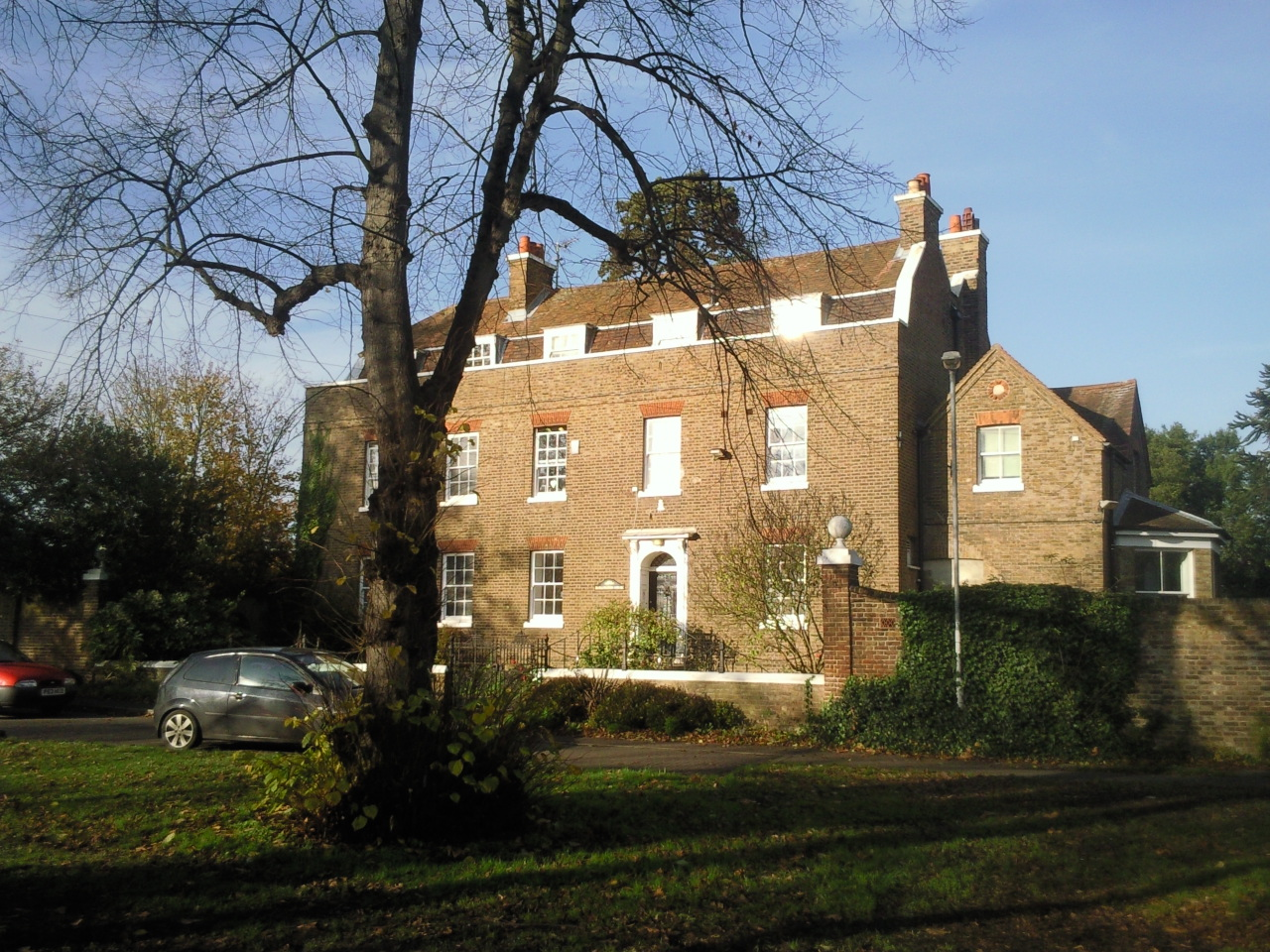
Burlington House is one of the largest Georgian homes in the Conservation Area. A significant proportion of such homes in the London Commuter Belt have been converted into apartments.

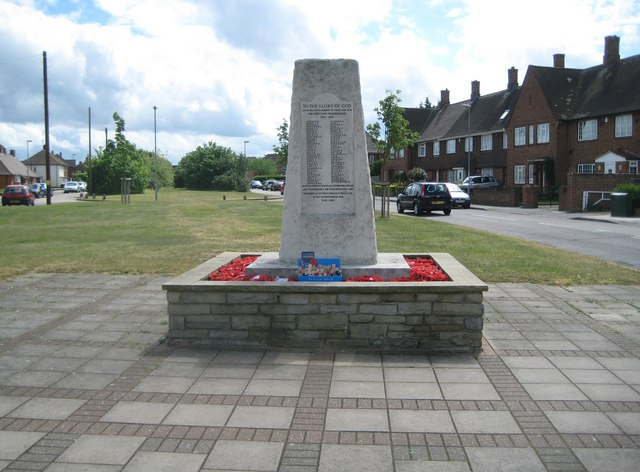
Gable end terraced housing with steep, tall hipped roofs by the war memorial with tessellating paving, square green and trees in the background.

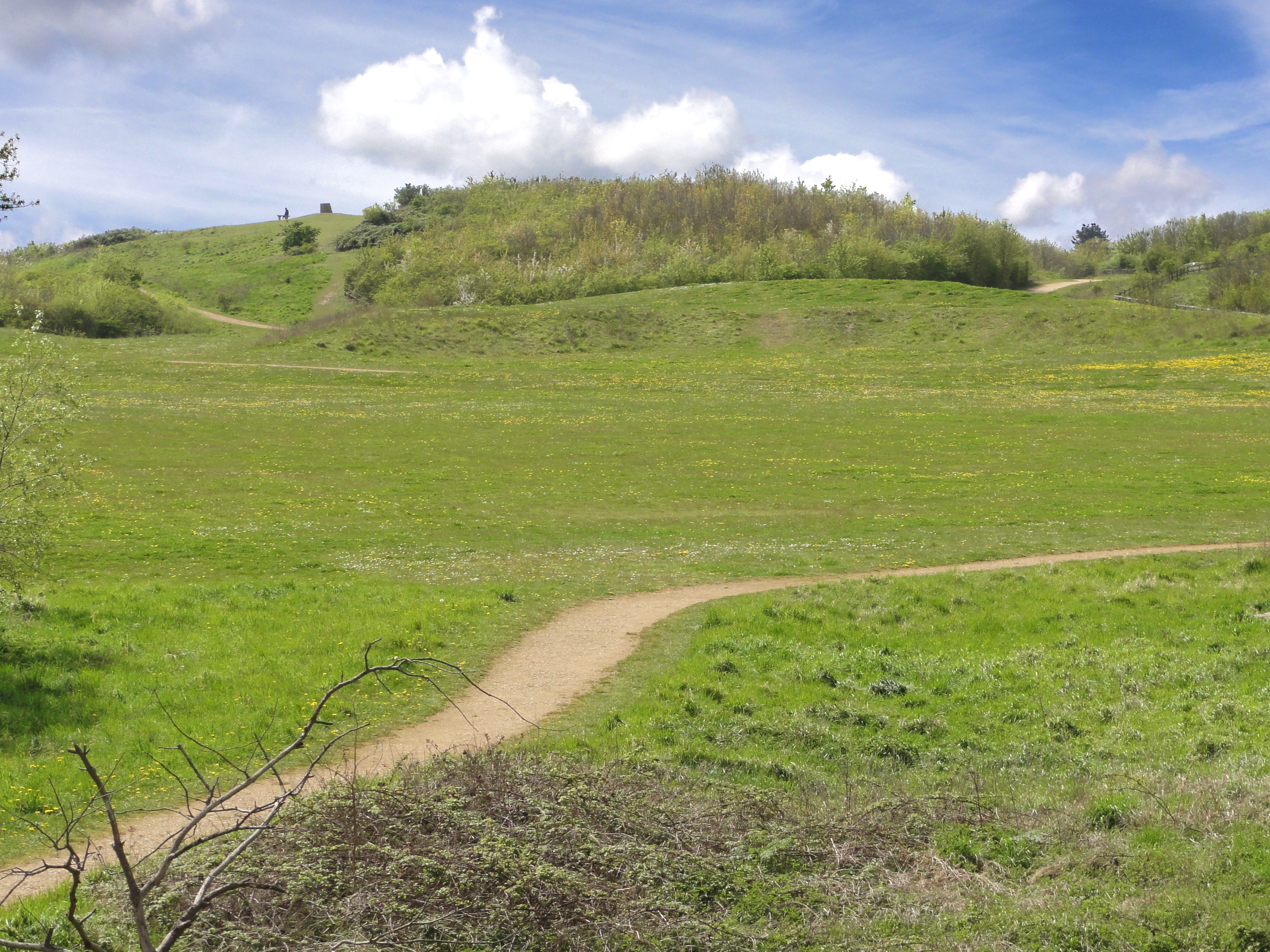
Bedfont Lakes Country Park.

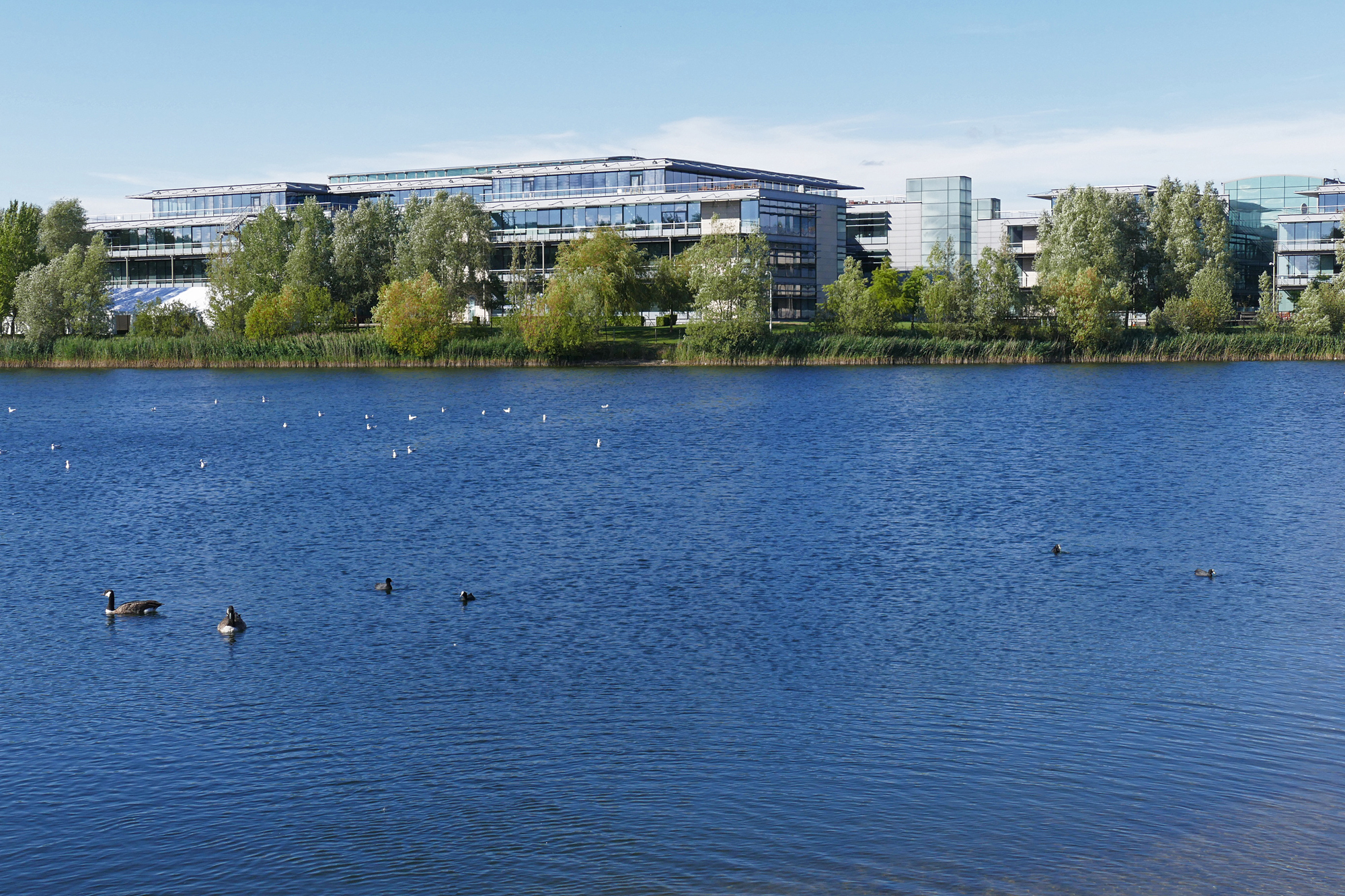
Cisco Systems office building at Bedfont Lakes Business Park.

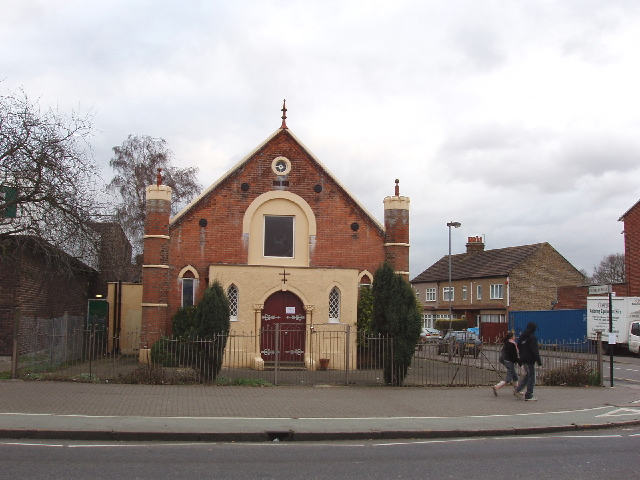
Bethany Free Church on Staines Road.

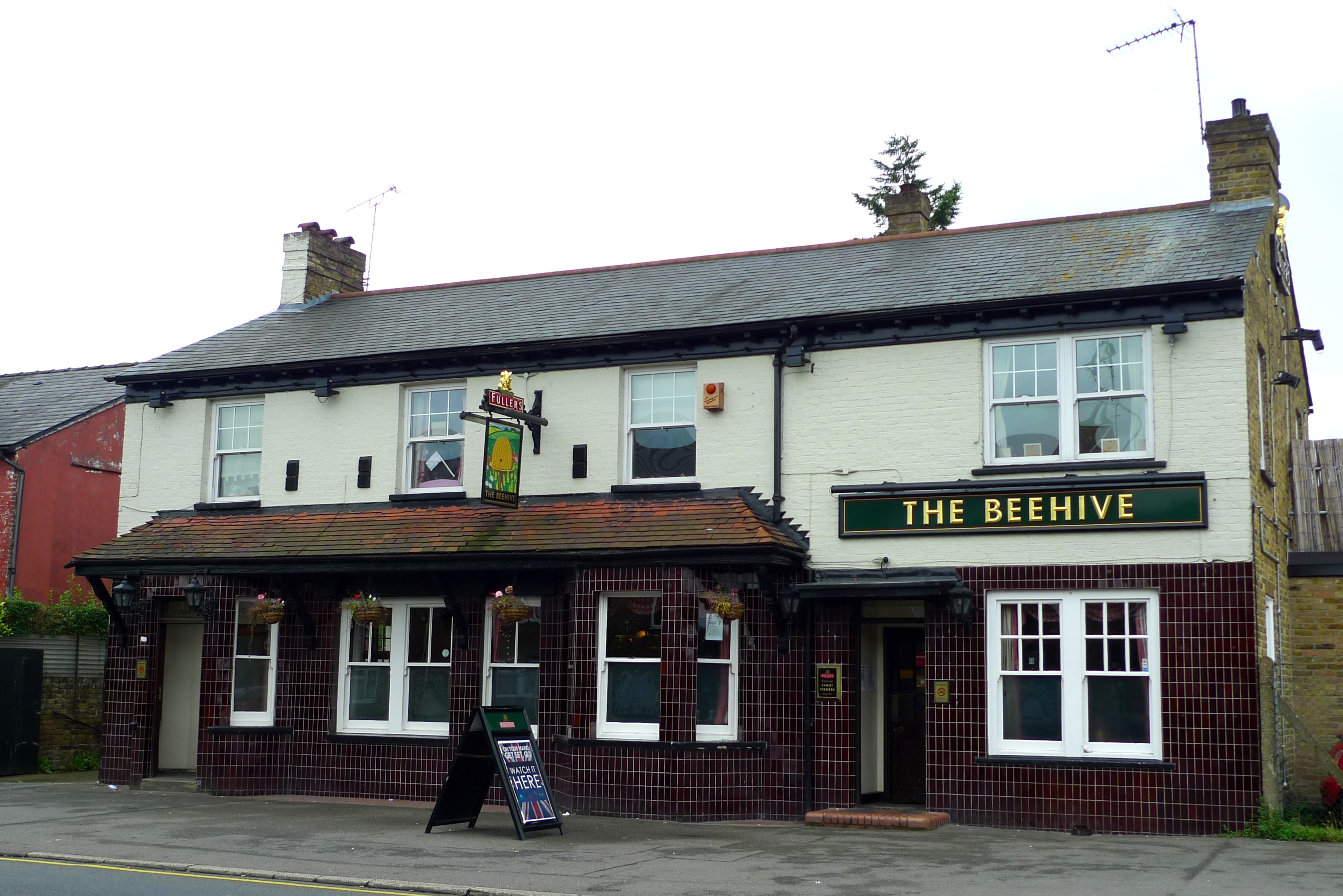
The Beehive, a Fuller's public house.

== See also ==
Media related to Bedfont at Wikimedia Commons
