= 2026–27 Combined Counties Football League =

Combined Counties Football League
- Season: 2026–27

The 2026–27 Combined Counties Football League season (known as the 2026–27 Cherry Red Records Combined Counties Football League for sponsorship reasons) will be the 49th in the history of the Combined Counties Football League, a football competition in England. The league consists of four divisions: the Premier North, the Premier South, Division One and Division Two. Division Two (details beyond the scope of this article) is intended largely for reserve and U23 sides, although it is also open to first teams.

The constitution was announced on 14 May 2026.

== Premier Division North ==
Premier Division North remains at 20 clubs, after Ashford Town and Windsor & Eton were promoted to step 4, Virginia Water were transferred to Premier Division South, British Airways and Milton United resigned and Edgware & Kingsbury were relegated to Division One.

Six new clubs joined the division:

- Two promoted from Division One:
  - Bedfont
  - Penn & Tylers Green
- One transferred from Premier Division South:
  - Thatcham Town
- One transferred from the United Counties League Premier Division South:
  - Easington Sports
- Two relegated from Southern League Division One Central:
  - Northwood
  - Rayners Lane

=== League table ===
Pos	Team	Pld	W	D	L	GF	GA	GD	Pts	Promotion, qualification or relegation
1	North Greenford United	19	14	3	2	54	21	+33	45	Promotion to step 4
2	Broadfields United	17	12	4	1	45	13	+32	40	Qualification for the play-offs
3	Ardley United	16	12	1	3	39	13	+26	37	Qualification for the play-offs
4	Burnham	18	10	3	5	35	20	+15	33	Qualification for the play-offs
5	Kidlington	16	10	2	4	37	19	+18	32	Qualification for the play-offs
6	Bedfont	19	9	2	8	37	30	+7	29	
7	Wokingham Town	18	8	5	5	32	26	+6	29	
8	Penn & Tylers Green	17	8	3	6	40	29	+11	27	
9	Abingdon United	17	9	0	8	28	31	−3	27	
10	Reading City	17	7	5	5	31	27	+4	26	
11	Wallingford & Crowmarsh	16	7	4	5	29	27	+2	25	
12	Thatcham Town	18	6	4	8	26	32	−6	22	
13	Easington Sports	16	6	3	7	18	22	−4	21	
14	Hilltop	19	5	5	9	26	44	−18	20	
15	Harefield United	15	4	6	5	27	26	+1	18	
16	Holyport	17	4	2	11	21	42	−21	14	
17	Northwood	17	3	4	10	19	40	−21	13	
18	Amersham Town	18	2	5	11	19	50	−31	11	
19	Rayners Lane	16	0	5	11	8	30	−22	5	Relegation to Division One
20	North Leigh	16	1	2	13	11	40	−29	5	Relegation to Division One

Updated to match(es) played on 22:59, 21 November 2026 (UTC). Source: CCL Prem Div North Table
Rules for classification: 1) points; 2) goal difference; 3) number of goals scored.

=== Results table ===
Home \ Away	ABI	AME	ARD	BED	BRO	BUR	EAS	HAR	HIL	HOL	KID	NGU	NLE	NOR	PTG	RAY	REA	THA	W&C	WOK
Abingdon United	—																			
Amersham Town		—																		
Ardley United			—																	
Bedfont				—																
Broadfields United					—															
Burnham						—														
Easington Sports							—													
Harefield United								—												
Hilltop									—											
Holyport										—										
Kidlington											—									
North Greenford United												—								
North Leigh													—							
Northwood														—						
Penn & Tylers Green															—					
Rayners Lane																—				
Reading City																	—			
Thatcham Town																		—		
Wallingford & Crowmarsh																			—	
Wokingham Town																				—

Updated to match(es) played on unknown. Source: The FA
Legend: Blue = home team win; Yellow = draw; Red = away team win.
For upcoming matches, an "a" indicates there is an article about the rivalry between the two participants.

=== Stadia and locations ===
Location of the clubs in the 2026–27 Combined Counties League Premier Division North (Berkshire, Buckinghamshire, and Oxfordshire)
Location of the clubs in the 2026–27 Combined Counties League Premier Division North (Greater London)

Club	Location	Stadium	Capacity
Abingdon United	Abingdon-on-Thames	The Northcourt	2,000
Amersham Town	Amersham	Spratleys Meadow	1,500
Ardley United	Ardley	The Playing Fields	1,000
Bedfont	Feltham	The Orchard	2,100
Broadfields United	Harrow	Tithe Farm Sports & Social Club (Note: Groundshare with Rayners Lane)	1,000
Burnham	Burnham	The 1878 Stadium	2,500
Easington Sports	Banbury	Addison Road	1,000
Harefield United	Harefield	Preston Park	1,200
Hilltop	Kingsbury	Silver Jubilee Park (Note: Groundshare with Hendon)	1,990
Holyport	Maidenhead	Summerleaze Village	1,000
Kidlington	Kidlington	Yarnton Road	1,500
North Greenford United	Greenford	Berkeley Fields	2,000
North Leigh	North Leigh	Eynsham Hall Park Sports Ground	2,000
Northwood	Northwood	Skyline Roofing Stadium	3,075
Penn & Tylers Green	Penn	French School Meadow	1,000
Rayners Lane	Harrow	Tithe Farm Sports & Social Club	1,000
Reading City	Reading	Rivermoor Stadium	2,000
Thatcham Town	Thatcham	Waterside Park	1,500
Wallingford & Crowmarsh	Wallingford	Hithercroft	1,500
Wokingham Town	Wokingham	Lowther Road	1,000

== Premier Division South ==
Premier Division South remains at 20 clubs after Cobham and Horley Town were promoted to step 4, Thatcham Town were transferred to Premier Division North and Guildford City were relegated.

Four new clubs joined the division:

- One promoted from Southern Combination League Division One:
  - Godalming Town
- One promoted from Wessex League Division One:
  - Yateley United
- One transferred from Premier Division North:
  - Virginia Water
- One relegated from the Isthmian League South Central Division:
  - Metropolitan Police

=== League table ===
Pos	Team	Pld	W	D	L	GF	GA	GD	Pts	Promotion, qualification or relegation
1	Knaphill	20	15	1	4	46	23	+23	46	Promotion to step 4
2	Fleet Town	18	13	4	1	41	16	+25	43	Qualification for the play-offs
3	Redhill	16	10	3	3	39	16	+23	33	Qualification for the play-offs
4	Abbey Rangers	18	9	5	4	28	27	+1	32	Qualification for the play-offs
5	Sutton Common Rovers	18	8	6	4	30	21	+9	30	Qualification for the play-offs
6	Camberley Town	17	9	1	7	32	32	0	28	
7	Tadley Calleva	14	7	5	2	32	18	+14	26	
8	Metropolitan Police	18	7	5	6	35	27	+8	26	
9	Sheerwater	17	6	6	5	37	26	+11	24	
10	Virginia Water	17	7	3	7	37	30	+7	24	
11	Tooting & Mitcham United	18	7	3	8	31	25	+6	24	
12	Corinthian-Casuals	18	6	6	6	33	31	+2	24	
13	Badshot Lea	18	6	5	7	25	38	−13	23	
14	Chipstead	18	6	3	9	20	22	−2	21	
15	Epsom & Ewell	17	5	3	9	28	34	−6	18	
16	Yateley United	18	4	6	8	21	28	−7	18	
17	Alton	19	4	5	10	19	38	−19	17	
18	Balham	15	4	2	9	15	29	−14	14	
19	Godalming Town	16	1	4	11	13	38	−25	7	Relegation to Division One
20	Eversley & California	16	0	2	14	12	55	−43	2	Relegation to Division One

Updated to match(es) played on 23:05, 18 November 2026 (UTC). Source: CCL Prem Div South Table
Rules for classification: 1) points; 2) goal difference; 3) number of goals scored.

=== Results table ===
Home \ Away	ABB	ALT	BAD	BAL	CAM	CHI	COR	E&E	E&C	FLE	GOD	KNA	MET	RED	SHE	SCR	TAD	TOO	VIR	YAT
Abbey Rangers	—																			
Alton		—																		
Badshot Lea			—																	
Balham				—																
Camberley Town					—															
Chipstead						—														
Corinthian-Casuals							—													
Epsom & Ewell								—												
Eversley & California									—											
Fleet Town										—										
Godalming Town											—									
Knaphill												—								
Metropolitan Police													—							
Redhill														—						
Sheerwater															—					
Sutton Common Rovers																—				
Tadley Calleva																	—			
Tooting & Mitcham United																		—		
Virginia Water																			—	
Yateley United																				—

Updated to match(es) played on unknown. Source: CCL Prem Div South Results Grid
Legend: Blue = home team win; Yellow = draw; Red = away team win.
For upcoming matches, an "a" indicates there is an article about the rivalry between the two participants.

=== Stadia and locations ===
Location of the clubs in the 2025–26 Combined Counties League Premier Division South (Surrey)
Location of the clubs in the 2025–26 Combined Counties League Premier Division South (Hampshire)

Club	Location	Stadium	Capacity
Abbey Rangers	Addlestone	Addlestone Moor	1,000
Alton	Alton	Anstey Park	2,000
Badshot Lea	Wrecclesham	Westfield Lane	1,200
Balham	Mitcham	Imperial Fields (Note: Groundshare with Tooting & Mitcham United)	3,500
Camberley Town	Camberley	Krooner Park	1,976
Chipstead	Chipstead	High Road	2,000
Corinthian-Casuals	Tolworth	King George's Field	2,700
Epsom & Ewell	Chessington	Queen Mary Recreation Ground (Note: Groundshare with Chessington & Hook United)	3,000
Eversley & California	Eversley	Fox Lane	1,000
Fleet Town	Fleet	Calthorpe Park	2,000
Godalming Town	Godalming	Wey Court	3,000
Knaphill	Knaphill	Redding Way	1,000
Metropolitan Police	East Molesey	Imber Court	3,000
Redhill	Redhill	Kiln Brow	2,000
Sheerwater	Sheerwater	Eastwood Centre	600
Sutton Common Rovers	Carshalton	War Memorial Sports Ground (Note: Groundshare with Carshalton Athletic)	5,000
Tadley Calleva	Tadley	Barlows Park	1,000
Tooting & Mitcham United	Mitcham	Imperial Fields	3,500
Virginia Water	Chertsey	Alwyns Lane (Note: Groundshare with Chertsey Town)	3,000
Yateley United	Yateley	Sean Devereux Park	500

== Division One ==
Division One was reduced from 24 to 22 clubs after Penn & Tylers Green and Bedfont were promoted to Premier Division North, Sandhurst Town were transferred to the Wessex League, Hillingdon Borough and Windsor resigned, and Chalfont St Peter were relegated.

Four new clubs joined the division:

- One promoted from Spartan South Midlands League Division Two:
  - Bovingdon
- One promoted from the Thames Valley Premier League:
  - Maidenhead Town
- One transferred from Spartan South Midlands League Division One:
  - Belstone
- One relegated from Premier Division North:
  - Edgware & Kingsbury
- Rising Ballers Kensington changed their name to Shepherd's Bush.
- Sport London e Benfica changed their name to Eagles Land Benfica.

=== League table ===
Pos	Team	Pld	W	D	L	GF	GA	GD	Pts	Promotion, qualification or relegation
1	Brook House	24	16	5	3	64	30	+34	53	Promotion to Premier Division North/South
2	Wembley	23	14	4	5	61	33	+28	46	Qualification for the play-offs
3	Westside	21	13	4	4	56	25	+31	43	Qualification for the play-offs
4	Colliers Wood United	20	13	4	3	50	25	+25	43	Qualification for the play-offs
5	PFC Victoria London	22	12	6	4	60	28	+32	42	Qualification for the play-offs
6	Langley	21	12	5	4	52	34	+18	41	
7	London Samurai Rovers	20	12	4	4	56	31	+25	40	
8	Bovingdon	21	10	7	4	38	31	+7	37	
9	Belstone	21	11	3	7	48	27	+21	36	
10	Holmer Green	21	10	5	6	44	28	+16	35	
11	Molesey	25	10	4	11	55	54	+1	34	
12	Berks County	22	9	5	8	53	37	+16	32	
13	Maidenhead Town	23	8	5	10	46	59	−13	29	
14	Oxhey Jets	22	8	4	10	33	45	−12	28	
15	Staines & Lammas (Middlesex)	23	6	8	9	38	41	−3	26	
16	Edgware & Kingsbury	24	6	4	14	33	59	−26	22	
17	Spelthorne Sports	22	5	5	12	24	44	−20	20	
18	Eagles Land Benfica	21	4	6	11	33	56	−23	18	
19	Woodley United	21	4	4	13	22	56	−34	16	
20	Spartans Youth	21	4	2	15	26	55	−29	14	Possible relegation to a feeder league
21	FC Deportivo Galicia	21	2	5	14	26	52	−26	11	Possible relegation to a feeder league
22	Shepherd's Bush	23	2	1	20	26	94	−68	7	Possible relegation to a feeder league

Updated to match(es) played on 23:06, 21 November 2026 (UTC). Source: CCL Div One Table
Rules for classification: 1) points; 2) goal difference; 3) number of goals scored.

=== Results table ===
Home \ Away	BEL	BER	BOV	BRK	CWU	ELB	E&K	DGA	HOL	LAN	LSR	MAI	MOL	OXH	PFC	SHE	SPA	SPE	S&L	WEM	WES	WOO
Belstone	—																					
Berks County		—																				
Bovingdon			—																			
Brook House				—																		
Colliers Wood United					—																	
Eagles Land Benfica						—																
Edgware & Kingsbury							—															
FC Deportivo Galicia								—														
Holmer Green									—													
Langley										—												
London Samurai Rovers											—											
Maidenhead Town												—										
Molesey													—									
Oxhey Jets														—								
PFC Victoria London															—							
Shepherd's Bush																—						
Spartans Youth																	—					
Spelthorne Sports																		—				
Staines & Lammas (Middlesex)																			—			
Wembley																				—		
Westside																					—	
Woodley United																						—

Updated to match(es) played on 6 September 2025. Source: CCL Div One Results Grid
Legend: Blue = home team win; Yellow = draw; Red = away team win.
For upcoming matches, an "a" indicates there is an article about the rivalry between the two participants.

=== Stadia and locations ===
Location of the clubs in the 2026–27 Combined Counties League Division One (Berkshire and Buckinghamshire)
Location of the clubs in the 2026–27 Combined Counties League Division One (Greater London)

Club	Location	Stadium	Capacity
Belstone	Radlett	The Medburn Ground	1,000
Berks County	Ascot	Ascot Racecourse (Note: Groundshare with Ascot United)	1,150
Bovingdon	Bovingdon	Green Lane	1,000
Brook House	Hayes	Farm Park	2,000
Colliers Wood United	Wimbledon	Wibbandune Sports Ground	2,000
Eagles Land Benfica	Harefield	Preston Park (Note: Groundshare with Harefield United)	1,500
Edgware & Kingsbury	Kingsbury	Silver Jubilee Park (Note: Groundshare with Hendon)	3,070
FC Deportivo Galicia	Bedfont	Bedfont Recreation Ground (Note: Groundshare with Bedfont Sports)	3,000
Holmer Green	Holmer Green	Watchet Lane	1,000
Langley	Slough	Arbour Park (Note: Groundshare with Slough Town)	2,000
London Samurai Rovers	Hanworth	Rectory Meadow (Note: Groundshare with Hanworth Villa)	1,000
Maidenhead Town	Burnham	The 1878 Stadium (Note: Groundshare with Burnham)	2,500
Molesey	West Molesey	Walton Road	4,000
Oxhey Jets	South Oxhey	The Boundary Stadium	2,000
PFC Victoria London	Bedfont	Bedfont Recreation Ground	3,000
Shepherd's Bush	Beaconsfield	Holloways Park (Note: Groundshare with Beaconsfield Town)	3,500
Spartans Youth	Bedfont	The Orchard (Note: Groundshare with Bedfont)	1,200
Spelthorne Sports	Ashford	Spelthorne Sports Club	1,000
Staines & Lammas (Middlesex)	Ashford	Spelthorne Sports Club (Note: Groundshare with Spelthorne Sports)	1,000
Wembley	Wembley	Vale Farm	2,450
Westside	Wimbledon	Wibbandune Sports Ground (Note: Groundshare with Colliers Wood United)	2,000
Woodley United	Tilehurst, Reading	Rivermoor Stadium (Note: Groundshare with Reading City)	2,000
