= 2024–25 Combined Counties Football League =

Combined Counties Football League
- Season: 2024–25

The 2024–25 Combined Counties Football League season (known as the 2024–25 Cherry Red Records Combined Counties Football League for sponsorship reasons) was the 47th in the history of the Combined Counties Football League, a football competition in England. The league consisted of four divisions: the Premier North, the Premier South, Division One and Division Two. Division Two (details beyond the scope of this article) is intended largely for reserve and U23 sides, although it is also open to first teams.

The constitution was announced on 17 May 2024. The two Premier Divisions (step 5) promote two clubs each; one each as champions and one each via a four-team play-off.

== Premier Division North ==
Premier Division North remained at 20 clubs, after Flackwell Heath and Rayners Lane were promoted to step 4, and Chalfont St Peter were relegated to Division One.

Three new clubs joined the division, all from Division One:

- Amersham Town
- Berks County
- British Airways

Wokingham & Emmbrook reverted to their original name of Wokingham Town.

=== League table ===
Pos	Team	Pld	W	D	L	GF	GA	GD	Pts	Promotion, qualification or relegation
1	Egham Town (C, P)	38	28	6	4	115	30	+85	90	Promoted to the Isthmian League South Central
2	Bedfont Sports (O, P)	38	25	6	7	92	34	+58	81	Qualified for the play-offs
3	Amersham Town	38	25	6	7	102	48	+54	81	Qualified for the play-offs
4	Harefield United	38	22	5	11	84	58	+26	71	Qualified for the play-offs
5	North Greenford United	38	19	5	14	77	53	+24	62	Qualified for the play-offs
6	Burnham	38	18	6	14	77	57	+20	60	
7	Milton United	38	18	5	15	75	61	+14	59	
8	Holyport	38	17	8	13	63	57	+6	59	
9	Virginia Water	38	15	9	14	71	68	+3	54	
10	Broadfields United	38	14	8	16	57	69	−12	50	
11	Ardley United	38	15	4	19	55	70	−15	49	
12	Wallingford & Crowmarsh	38	12	10	16	54	58	−4	46	
13	Reading City	38	12	8	18	58	77	−19	44	
14	Wokingham Town	38	13	5	20	57	84	−27	44	
15	Hilltop	38	12	7	19	49	85	−36	43	
16	Edgware & Kingsbury	38	11	5	22	51	86	−35	38	
17	British Airways	38	9	10	19	57	79	−22	37	
18	Risborough Rangers	38	8	12	18	40	81	−41	36	Transferred to the Spartan South Midlands League
19	Berks County (R)	38	10	6	22	57	99	−42	36	Relegated to Division One
20	Wembley (R)	38	10	3	25	55	92	−37	33	Relegated to Division One

Source: CCL Prem Div North Table
Rules for classification: 1) points; 2) goal difference; 3) number of goals scored.
(C) Champions; (O) Play-off winners; (P) Promoted; (R) Relegated

=== Results table ===
Home \ Away	AME	ARD	BED	BER	BAW	BRF	BUR	E&K	EGH	HAR	HLT	HOL	MIL	NGU	REA	RIS	VIR	W&C	WEM	WOK
Amersham Town	—	2–2	1–2	6–1	3–0	2–0	2–1	4–1	0–1	1–2	5–2	1–1	3–0	3–1	2–2	6–2	6–0	2–0	4–1	4–0
Ardley United	1–2	—	0–3	7–1	1–0	1–2	1–1	0–2	0–3	4–1	1–1	2–1	2–0	1–2	1–0	3–1	0–3	2–1	3–0	6–3
Bedfont Sports	2–2	4–1	—	1–2	2–2	2–0	3–1	3–0	4–2	2–1	1–1	2–1	3–0	1–1	3–4	5–0	1–1	0–0	3–0	6–0
Berks County	0–3	1–3	1–0	—	2–2	1–2	1–4	2–1	2–4	1–3	0–2	1–1	1–7	2–1	2–1	4–3	1–3	3–3	7–3	2–3
British Airways	2–3	0–1	0–3	2–2	—	3–0	0–4	3–1	1–3	0–0	1–4	2–4	2–1	3–2	3–3	1–1	0–2	3–1	1–2	3–1
Broadfields United	3–4	1–1	1–2	1–0	1–1	—	1–2	1–1	2–1	2–1	1–4	1–0	0–3	0–1	3–2	1–3	3–3	0–0	3–2	2–2
Burnham	0–4	3–0	0–3	4–0	2–0	1–1	—	4–1	1–3	1–4	1–1	1–2	3–1	1–0	2–1	1–1	2–2	3–0	5–0	5–2
Edgware & Kingsbury	0–2	5–0	0–5	1–0	2–0	0–3	2–5	—	1–5	2–4	3–1	0–4	1–2	2–2	1–1	3–1	3–0	1–1	0–1	2–1
Egham Town	2–2	5–0	0–1	6–0	2–2	3–0	3–0	4–2	—	0–0	11–0	0–0	3–0	2–1	3–1	7–1	3–2	3–1	4–1	0–1
Harefield United	1–0	3–0	2–1	2–1	1–1	3–0	2–1	7–0	1–3	—	3–1	1–0	1–1	2–5	3–1	2–0	2–1	3–1	5–3	1–2
Hilltop	2–1	1–0	1–4	2–2	2–5	1–2	0–4	4–1	1–3	3–2	—	0–3	2–4	1–5	2–1	0–2	1–4	2–1	0–3	2–0
Holyport	5–2	3–1	1–4	2–2	3–0	0–2	3–0	1–0	0–5	5–4	3–0	—	1–1	1–3	2–0	1–1	1–1	0–2	4–1	1–0
Milton United	4–1	5–1	2–1	3–0	5–2	4–1	1–1	2–1	0–3	2–3	1–1	1–0	—	2–0	4–0	4–0	0–1	0–2	2–1	1–2
North Greenford United	2–3	3–2	0–2	1–2	3–0	0–2	3–1	3–1	0–0	2–1	1–2	3–1	7–1	—	4–1	4–1	1–1	2–3	2–0	1–1
Reading City	1–2	3–1	0–4	3–1	3–1	4–2	2–1	1–0	0–7	2–3	1–0	2–3	0–1	0–2	—	2–1	0–0	1–1	3–3	2–1
Risborough Rangers	1–1	0–1	0–4	1–0	2–2	1–1	1–0	4–1	1–1	0–2	0–0	1–1	1–1	0–4	2–2	—	2–1	0–5	0–2	3–1
Virginia Water	1–2	1–0	3–1	2–3	2–1	1–5	1–4	1–3	1–4	3–2	0–0	6–1	3–2	3–0	1–4	5–0	—	2–1	1–2	2–3
Wallingford & Crowmarsh	0–2	1–2	0–1	2–1	1–4	2–1	2–3	1–2	0–1	2–2	1–2	3–0	2–1	3–1	1–1	1–0	1–1	—	1–1	2–1
Wembley	2–4	0–2	1–2	3–2	1–2	4–1	3–2	1–2	0–3	2–3	1–0	0–1	1–4	0–2	1–2	1–2	1–4	3–3	—	4–2
Wokingham Town	0–5	2–1	2–1	1–3	3–2	3–5	0–2	2–2	0–2	2–1	3–0	1–2	4–2	1–2	3–1	0–0	2–2	1–2	1–0	—

Source: CCL Prem Div North Results Grid
Legend: Blue = home team win; Yellow = draw; Red = away team win.
For upcoming matches, an "a" indicates there is an article about the rivalry between the two participants.

=== Promotion playoffs ===
Semi-finals
2	Bedfont Sports	3
5	North Greenford United	1
3	Amersham Town	1
4	Harefield United	2

Final
2	Bedfont Sports	3
4	Harefield United	1

==== Semifinals ====
26 April	Bedfont Sports	3–1	North Greenford United	Bedfont
15:00 GMT	Myers 50'; Williams 76', 87'	Report	Jude-Boyd 79'	Stadium: Bedfont Recreation Ground; Attendance: 251; Referee: Michael Smith

26 April	Amersham Town	1–2	Harefield United	Amersham
15:00 GMT	Stead 45+1'	Report	Miller 83'; Tamplin 88'	Stadium: Spratleys Meadow; Attendance: 311 or 315

==== Final ====
3 May	Bedfont Sports	3–1	Harefield United	Bedfont
15:00 GMT	Woods 29'; Fuller 61'; Jakes-McKay 90+4'	Report	Chendlik 36'	Stadium: Bedfont Recreation Ground; Attendance: 1,109; Referee: Robert Alderton

=== Stadia and locations ===
Location of the clubs in the 2024–25 Combined Counties League Premier Division North (Berkshire, Buckinghamshire, and Oxfordshire)
Location of the clubs in the 2024–25 Combined Counties League Premier Division North (Greater London)

Club	Location	Stadium	Capacity
Amersham Town	Amersham	Spratleys Meadow	1,500
Ardley United	Ardley	The Playing Fields	1,000
Bedfont Sports	Bedfont	Bedfont Recreation Ground	3,000
Berks County	Ascot	Ascot Racecourse (Note: Groundshare with Ascot United)	1,150
British Airways	Ashford	Spelthorne Sports Club (Note: Groundshare with Spelthorne Sports)	1,000
Broadfields United	Harrow	Tithe Farm Sports & Social Club (Note: Groundshare with Rayners Lane)	1,000
Burnham	Burnham	The 1878 Stadium	2,500
Edgware & Kingsbury	Kingsbury	Silver Jubilee Park (Note: Groundshare with Hendon)	1,990
Egham Town	Egham	Runnymede Stadium	5,500
Harefield United	Harefield	Preston Park	1,200
Hilltop	Beaconsfield	Holloways Park (Note: Groundshare with Beaconsfield Town)	3,500
Holyport	Maidenhead	Summerleaze Village	1,000
Milton United	Milton	Potash Lane	1,000
North Greenford United	Greenford	Berkeley Fields	2,000
Reading City	Reading	Rivermoor Stadium	2,000
Risborough Rangers	Princes Risborough	The KAMTECH Stadium	1,500
Virginia Water	Slough	Arbour Park (Note: Groundshare with Slough Town)	2,000
Wallingford & Crowmarsh	Wallingford	Hithercroft	1,500
Wembley	Wembley	Vale Farm	2,450
Wokingham Town	Wokingham	Lowther Road	1,000

== Premier Division South ==
Premier Division South remained at 20 clubs after Farnham Town and AFC Croydon Athletic were promoted to step 4; and Colliers Wood United were relegated to Division One.

Three new clubs joined the division:

- Two relegated from the Isthmian League South Central Division:
  - Chipstead
  - Corinthian-Casuals
- One promoted from Southern Counties East League Division One:
  - AFC Whyteleafe

=== League table ===
Pos	Team	Pld	W	D	L	GF	GA	GD	Pts	Promotion, qualification or relegation
1	AFC Whyteleafe (C, P)	38	31	2	5	107	39	+68	95	Promoted to the Isthmian League South East
2	Jersey Bulls (O, P)	38	30	6	2	103	22	+81	93 (Note: Jersey Bulls had three points deducted for fielding an ineligible player in their 4–0 win over Tooting & Mitcham United on 29 March 2025. Jersey's appeal was rejected.)	Qualified for the play-offs
3	Redhill	38	31	3	4	91	29	+62	93 (Note: After Jersey's points deduction, the club made a complaint to the league regarding Redhill. Redhill were consequently deducted three points for fielding an ineligible player in December 2024. Their appeal was rejected.)	Qualified for the play-offs
4	Cobham	38	21	10	7	82	37	+45	73	Qualified for the play-offs
5	Fleet Town	38	19	9	10	64	45	+19	66	Qualified for the play-offs
6	Tadley Calleva	38	19	5	14	75	70	+5	62	
7	Knaphill	38	16	9	13	57	61	−4	57	
8	Tooting & Mitcham United	38	15	9	14	62	54	+8	54	
9	Horley Town	38	15	6	17	74	84	−10	51	
10	Alton	38	14	8	16	54	59	−5	50	
11	Abbey Rangers	38	12	10	16	54	68	−14	46	
12	Guildford City	38	11	9	18	48	61	−13	42	
13	Corinthian-Casuals	38	11	8	19	59	73	−14	41	
14	Sheerwater	38	11	8	19	58	73	−15	41	
15	Epsom & Ewell	38	12	5	21	52	79	−27	41	
16	Camberley Town	38	9	11	18	50	65	−15	38	
17	Chipstead	38	10	6	22	50	99	−49	36	
18	Balham	38	9	7	22	45	73	−28	34	
19	Sandhurst Town (R)	38	9	6	23	65	97	−32	33	Relegated to Division One
20	Spelthorne Sports (R)	38	2	9	27	29	91	−62	15	Relegated to Division One

Source: CCL Prem Div South Table
Rules for classification: 1) points; 2) goal difference; 3) number of goals scored.
(C) Champions; (O) Play-off winners; (P) Promoted; (R) Relegated

=== Results table ===
Home \ Away	ABB	WHY	ALT	BAL	CAM	CHI	COB	COR	E&E	FLE	GUI	HOR	JER	KNA	RED	SAN	SHE	SPE	TAD	TMU
Abbey Rangers	—	2–5	1–0	1–1	0–0	1–2	1–1	4–2	2–1	1–1	2–4	3–3	1–2	2–2	0–3	2–1	3–1	2–1	1–2	1–1
AFC Whyteleafe	3–4	—	4–2	5–3	3–0	7–0	1–0	5–1	3–1	0–0	4–1	5–1	0–1	3–1	3–4	1–0	2–1	1–1	5–1	2–0
Alton	1–3	0–1	—	2–0	1–0	2–1	0–1	1–1	1–2	2–2	2–2	4–2	0–2	3–0	3–2	1–3	0–1	2–1	2–3	3–0
Balham	4–1	0–3	0–1	—	2–2	3–1	2–2	1–0	2–2	0–1	1–1	1–2	1–4	1–2	0–2	1–0	4–0	1–0	1–2	0–1
Camberley Town	0–0	0–1	2–2	2–0	—	3–4	2–2	1–0	0–1	1–1	1–1	1–3	0–1	0–2	0–3	2–1	0–1	1–0	4–0	1–1
Chipstead	1–1	0–4	1–2	3–1	1–2	—	1–1	3–2	2–0	0–2	0–2	2–5	1–8	1–4	2–5	1–0	2–1	3–3	1–3	1–2
Cobham	3–0	1–3	2–0	2–2	3–0	4–1	—	1–0	1–2	0–2	1–0	4–0	0–0	1–2	4–1	7–1	4–0	5–0	5–2	2–1
Corinthian-Casuals	2–1	1–3	0–1	2–0	4–4	2–2	1–4	—	1–2	2–2	1–2	3–3	3–4	0–1	1–3	4–2	4–1	2–0	1–2	0–0
Epsom & Ewell	2–1	1–4	1–0	2–3	2–0	2–0	1–3	1–2	—	2–2	0–5	2–2	0–2	3–5	2–4	1–2	0–3	1–0	2–1	1–2
Fleet Town	3–1	0–2	1–1	0–1	3–0	3–1	2–2	3–0	2–0	—	0–1	2–1	1–4	2–1	2–0	3–1	3–0	3–1	2–0	0–0
Guildford City	2–0	1–2	0–3	1–0	2–4	2–3	0–4	1–2	1–0	1–4	—	1–0	0–2	0–0	0–1	2–2	1–1	1–1	1–2	2–1
Horley Town	2–0	2–3	2–1	3–1	1–3	0–2	3–5	4–5	2–0	1–2	2–1	—	0–0	1–0	1–4	3–1	2–1	2–2	1–6	2–4
Jersey Bulls	2–0	0–1	2–2	3–0	2–1	2–0	0–0	2–0	5–1	4–0	1–0	6–1	—	6–0	1–2	1–0	1–0	6–0	3–0	4–0
Knaphill	1–3	1–3	1–1	4–2	3–1	3–2	0–1	1–1	2–1	3–1	2–1	3–2	1–3	—	1–2	3–0	0–0	2–0	2–1	0–3
Redhill	3–0	0–1	3–1	4–0	2–0	5–0	0–0	1–0	2–2	2–0	3–2	2–0	1–1	1–0	—	2–0	2–0	6–0	5–0	2–1
Sandhurst Town	0–1	4–3	2–3	4–3	0–5	2–2	3–2	1–1	4–1	4–2	1–1	1–4	1–6	2–2	0–2	—	5–1	3–3	4–5	3–5
Sheerwater	2–3	0–3	5–0	0–0	4–3	6–1	1–1	3–4	2–2	3–1	2–1	0–1	2–2	2–2	1–2	3–0	—	1–1	2–0	2–1
Spelthorne Sports	0–3	0–3	1–3	1–2	1–1	0–1	0–1	1–2	1–4	1–3	1–1	0–4	1–6	0–0	0–1	1–4	2–1	—	0–1	3–2
Tadley Calleva	2–0	1–3	1–1	3–1	2–2	1–1	2–0	1–0	5–2	0–3	4–1	1–4	1–3	5–0	0–2	3–2	6–1	4–0	—	1–1
Tooting & Mitcham United	2–2	3–2	3–0	4–0	5–1	3–0	0–2	1–2	0–2	1–0	1–2	2–2	0–1	0–0	0–2	4–1	4–3	2–1	1–1	—

Source: CCL Prem Div South Results Grid
Legend: Blue = home team win; Yellow = draw; Red = away team win.
For upcoming matches, an "a" indicates there is an article about the rivalry between the two participants.

=== Promotion playoffs ===
Semi-finals
2	Jersey Bulls	1 (3)
5	Fleet Town	1 (0)
3	Redhill	0 (2)
4	Cobham	0 (3)

Final
2	Jersey Bulls	2
4	Cobham	1

==== Semifinals ====
24 May	Jersey Bulls	1–1 (3–0 p)	Fleet Town	St Helier
13:00 BST	Stepney 58' (o.g.)	Report	Smith 88'	Stadium: Springfield Stadium; Attendance: 1,147; Referee: Joe Alborough

24 May	Redhill	0–0 (2–3 p)	Cobham	Redhill
15:00 BST		Report		Stadium: Kiln Brow; Attendance: 667

==== Final ====
28 May	Jersey Bulls	2–1	Cobham	St Helier
19:45 BST	Kilshaw 13'; Barlow 54'	Report	Murray 70' (pen.)	Stadium: Springfield Stadium; Attendance: 1,801; Referee: Daniel Harvey

=== Stadia and locations ===
Map showing the location of teams in Division 2
Location of the clubs in the 2024–25 Combined Counties League Premier Division South (Surrey)
Location of the clubs in the 2024–25 Combined Counties League Premier Division South (Hampshire)
Location of the clubs in the 2024–25 Combined Counties League Premier Division South (Channel Islands)

Club	Location	Stadium	Capacity
Abbey Rangers	Addlestone	Addlestone Moor	1,000
AFC Whyteleafe	Whyteleafe	Church Road	2,000
Alton	Alton	Anstey Park	2,000
Balham	Mitcham	Imperial Fields (Note: Groundshare with Tooting & Mitcham United)	3,500
Camberley Town	Camberley	Krooner Park	1,976
Chipstead	Chipstead	High Road	2,000
Cobham	Cobham	Leg O'Mutton Field	2,000
Corinthian-Casuals	Tolworth	King George's Field	2,700
Epsom & Ewell	Cobham	Leg O'Mutton Field (Note: Groundshare with Cobham)	2,000
Fleet Town	Fleet	Calthorpe Park	2,000
Guildford City	Guildford	Spectrum Football Ground	1,320
Horley Town	Horley	The New Defence	1,800
Jersey Bulls	Saint Helier	Springfield Stadium	2,000
Knaphill	Knaphill	Redding Way	1,000
Redhill	Redhill	Kiln Brow	2,000
Sandhurst Town	Sandhurst	Bottom Meadow	1,950
Sheerwater	Sheerwater	Eastwood Centre	600
Spelthorne Sports	Ashford	Spelthorne Sports Club	1,000
Tadley Calleva	Tadley	Barlows Park	1,000
Tooting & Mitcham United	Mitcham	Imperial Fields	3,500

== Division One ==
Division One was increased from 22 to 23 clubs after Amersham Town, Berks County and British Airways were promoted to Premier Division North; London Colney were transferred to Spartan South Midlands League Division One, and Bagshot were relegated.

Six new clubs joined the division:

- One relegated from Premier Division North:
  - Chalfont St Peter
- One relegated from Premier Division South:
  - Colliers Wood United
- One promoted from the Hertfordshire Senior County League:
  - Belstone
- One promoted from the Middlesex County League:
  - PFC Victoria London
- One promoted from the Surrey Premier County League:
  - Staines & Lammas (Middlesex)
- One promoted from the Thames Valley Premier League:
  - Windsor & Eton

=== League table ===
Pos	Team	Pld	W	D	L	GF	GA	GD	Pts	Promotion, qualification or relegation
1	Windsor & Eton (C, P)	44	33	5	6	108	35	+73	104	Promoted to Premier Division North
2	Westside	44	29	6	9	113	54	+59	93	Qualified for the play-offs
3	Penn & Tylers Green	44	28	8	8	97	51	+46	92	Qualified for the play-offs
4	Eversley & California (O, P)	44	25	9	10	92	53	+39	84	Qualified for the play-offs
5	Belstone	44	25	8	11	100	56	+44	83	Qualified for the play-offs, then transferred to the Spartan South Midlands League
6	Hillingdon Borough	44	23	9	12	94	66	+28	78	
7	Holmer Green	44	22	7	15	88	76	+12	73	
8	Brook House	44	21	7	16	104	91	+13	70	
9	Molesey	44	18	14	12	89	65	+24	68	
10	Yateley United	44	20	7	17	90	89	+1	67	Transferred to the Wessex League
11	Bedfont	44	17	9	18	69	73	−4	60	
12	PFC Victoria London	44	17	7	20	72	88	−16	58	
13	Oxhey Jets	44	15	7	22	71	88	−17	52	
14	Langley	44	14	8	22	77	93	−16	50	
15	Colliers Wood United	44	12	12	20	57	71	−14	48	
16	Spartans Youth	44	12	11	21	56	75	−19	47	
17	Chalfont St Peter	44	14	4	26	50	85	−35	46	
18	London Samurai Rovers	44	12	8	24	68	99	−31	44	
19	Staines & Lammas (Middlesex)	44	11	10	23	70	93	−23	43	
20	Woodley United	44	12	7	25	70	106	−36	43	
21	Windsor	44	11	9	24	62	92	−30	42	Reprieved from relegation
22	Rising Ballers Kensington	44	12	6	26	59	102	−43	42	Reprieved from relegation
23	FC Deportivo Galicia	44	10	8	26	64	119	−55	38	Reprieved from relegation

Source: CCL Div One Table
Rules for classification: 1) points; 2) goal difference; 3) number of goals scored.
(C) Champions; (O) Play-off winners; (P) Promoted

=== Results table ===
Home \ Away	BED	BEL	BRK	CSP	CWU	E&C	DGA	HLB	HMG	LAN	LSR	MOL	OXJ	PTG	PVL	RBK	SPY	S&L	WES	WIN	W&E	WOO	YAT
Bedfont	—	2–2	1–1	3–1	1–1	2–0	2–3	0–0	2–0	2–1	3–0	2–2	3–2	1–2	1–2	1–0	0–4	2–3	0–2	1–0	0–2	4–3	1–1
Belstone	5–1	—	2–0	5–2	2–1	2–1	6–0	0–2	2–1	0–0	5–2	0–3	2–0	3–1	2–1	4–0	4–1	4–0	1–2	2–1	2–2	1–2	6–0
Brook House	1–2	2–1	—	1–0	2–1	2–1	0–3	3–2	1–4	3–1	5–2	3–2	5–0	0–3	1–2	6–1	2–1	1–2	4–1	6–0	1–0	1–4	3–2
Chalfont St Peter	0–5	2–1	0–1	—	2–0	0–3	1–2	3–2	2–0	2–5	1–0	0–3	0–1	0–3	1–0	1–1	2–1	0–0	1–2	2–2	0–2	3–1	2–0
Colliers Wood United	1–1	2–1	2–2	2–1	—	2–1	3–3	1–3	0–1	1–1	1–1	1–1	1–2	1–2	2–3	0–1	1–1	3–2	1–3	0–1	1–2	2–1	2–1
Eversley & California	2–1	1–1	5–0	0–4	1–1	—	3–0	2–0	1–1	5–0	3–2	3–3	2–0	1–1	3–0	5–0	2–0	1–1	2–1	1–0	3–2	1–1	1–2
FC Deportivo Galicia	1–5	1–1	4–7	1–2	1–1	0–4	—	2–3	1–1	0–2	2–4	2–4	2–0	2–5	2–0	2–0	1–0	0–6	1–2	2–5	0–4	3–1	1–3
Hillingdon Borough	2–1	2–0	4–2	2–1	0–2	1–2	5–0	—	5–1	2–0	1–1	1–0	7–1	1–2	4–2	2–3	2–0	3–2	2–0	2–0	1–3	1–4	6–1
Holmer Green	3–1	1–2	3–2	2–0	2–0	1–2	3–1	2–2	—	1–1	3–1	3–3	2–1	0–2	4–2	4–2	5–2	1–0	1–3	3–0	2–0	9–2	0–3
Langley	6–0	2–2	7–2	1–2	3–2	1–1	2–1	2–5	1–4	—	3–0	1–3	1–0	1–2	3–4	2–3	5–1	1–1	0–6	0–2	1–5	2–0	1–4
London Samurai Rovers	1–4	6–4	4–4	4–0	1–4	0–4	1–1	1–3	1–3	1–3	—	2–0	4–1	2–0	1–2	4–3	0–1	1–0	1–3	1–1	1–2	1–0	1–3
Molesey	1–1	1–1	4–0	1–2	2–1	1–2	3–1	4–0	2–0	1–2	5–0	—	3–1	1–1	3–2	3–1	3–0	2–2	1–1	2–2	1–4	3–3	0–2
Oxhey Jets	2–3	1–1	4–4	0–1	4–2	0–2	4–0	2–3	4–0	2–0	1–0	4–0	—	1–1	0–1	3–4	1–2	1–4	2–2	3–1	1–0	4–2	2–2
Penn & Tylers Green	1–0	0–1	4–0	4–0	3–1	4–2	5–5	5–1	0–2	4–2	1–2	3–2	1–2	—	4–1	0–0	2–1	2–1	1–0	5–0	0–3	1–0	1–1
PFC Victoria London	0–1	0–3	0–5	5–3	1–1	3–1	1–1	2–1	0–4	3–3	3–1	5–1	0–0	1–3	—	2–0	2–1	2–3	1–5	3–1	0–3	2–0	5–2
Rising Ballers Kensington	0–1	2–3	2–3	1–0	0–0	0–3	3–1	0–1	1–2	0–1	2–2	1–1	1–2	0–4	3–2	—	3–1	3–1	0–3	1–4	1–2	1–3	1–4
Spartans Youth	2–3	3–1	1–0	1–1	2–1	0–1	2–2	1–1	0–2	1–1	1–1	0–1	1–0	0–0	0–0	5–2	—	4–1	0–2	1–2	1–3	3–1	1–2
Staines & Lammas (Middlesex)	4–0	0–1	1–6	4–2	0–1	0–1	2–5	2–2	1–1	2–3	5–1	0–2	1–1	1–2	1–1	1–3	3–3	—	1–2	3–2	0–5	4–1	0–5
Westside	2–1	3–2	1–1	2–0	1–2	5–1	4–1	1–1	9–3	4–3	1–2	1–1	4–2	0–2	1–3	5–1	5–0	3–0	—	3–1	1–1	2–1	7–0
Windsor	2–1	1–2	3–2	3–2	1–3	2–2	1–2	1–1	3–0	2–0	0–3	2–2	3–4	0–3	0–0	1–2	1–1	3–2	0–3	—	1–1	1–2	0–2
Windsor & Eton	2–1	0–2	2–2	3–0	4–0	5–4	4–0	2–2	1–0	1–0	2–0	2–1	2–1	5–0	2–1	3–1	0–1	4–0	2–0	1–0	—	7–1	2–0
Woodley United	1–1	0–4	0–5	3–1	3–0	0–3	2–0	1–2	2–2	3–1	2–2	0–6	5–0	0–4	4–0	1–1	1–2	2–2	1–2	4–3	0–3	—	1–4
Yateley United	2–1	1–4	2–2	2–0	0–2	1–3	2–1	1–1	5–1	3–1	3–2	0–1	3–4	3–3	3–2	3–4	2–2	0–1	2–3	6–3	0–3	2–1	—

Source: CCL Div One Results Grid
Legend: Blue = home team win; Yellow = draw; Red = away team win.
For upcoming matches, an "a" indicates there is an article about the rivalry between the two participants.

=== Promotion playoffs ===
Semi-finals
2	Westside	2
5	Belstone	0
3	Penn & Tylers Green	2 (2)
4	Eversley & California	2 (4)

Final
2	Westside	0
4	Eversley & California	1

==== Semifinals ====
26 April	Westside	2–0	Belstone	Wandsworth
15:00 GMT	Campbell 8'; George 15'	Report		Stadium: Wibbandune; Attendance: 56

26 April	Penn & Tylers Green	2–2 (2–4 p)	Eversley & California	Penn
15:00 GMT	Odomosu 64'; Halatyn 90+6'	Report	Paxford 83'; King 89'	Stadium: French School Meadows; Attendance: 177; Referee: Adam Jones

==== Final ====
2 May	Westside	0–1	Eversley & California	Wandsworth
19:30 GMT		Report	Pantony 34'	Stadium: Wibbandune; Attendance: 339

=== Stadia and locations ===
Location of the clubs in the 2024–25 Combined Counties League Division One (Berkshire and Buckinghamshire)
Location of the clubs in the 2024–25 Combined Counties League Division One (Greater London)

Club	Location	Stadium	Capacity
Bedfont	Bedfont	The Orchard	1,200
Belstone	Radlett	Medburn Ground	1,000
Brook House	Hayes	Farm Park	2,000
Chalfont St Peter	Chalfont St Peter	Mill Meadow	1,500
Colliers Wood United	Wimbledon	Wibbandune Sports Ground	2,000
Eversley & California	Eversley	Fox Lane	1,000
FC Deportivo Galicia	Bedfont	Bedfont Recreation Ground (Note: Groundshare with Bedfont Sports)	3,000
Hillingdon Borough	Ruislip	Middlesex Stadium	3,587
Holmer Green	Holmer Green	Watchet Lane	
Langley	West Drayton	Honeycroft (Note: Groundshare with Uxbridge)	3,770
London Samurai Rovers	Hanworth	Rectory Meadow (Note: Groundshare with Hanworth Villa)	1,000
Molesey	West Molesey	Walton Road	4,000
Oxhey Jets	South Oxhey	The Boundary Stadium	2,000
Penn & Tylers Green	Penn	French School Meadow	900
PFC Victoria London	Ashford	Robert Parker Stadium (Note: Groundshare with Ashford Town (Middlesex))	2,550
Rising Ballers Kensington	Greenford	Berkeley Fields (Note: Groundshare with North Greenford United)	2,000
Spartans Youth	Bedfont	The Orchard (Note: Groundshare with Bedfont)	1,200
Staines & Lammas (Middlesex)	Addlestone	Addlestone Moor (Note: Groundshare with Abbey Rangers)	1,000
Westside	Wimbledon	Wibbandune Sports Ground (Note: Groundshare with Colliers Wood United)	2,000
Windsor	Beaconsfield	Holloways Park (Note: Groundshare with Beaconsfield Town)	3,500
Windsor & Eton	Windsor	Stag Meadow	4,500
Woodley United	Tilehurst, Reading	Rivermoor Stadium (Note: Groundshare with Reading City)	2,000
Yateley United	Yateley	Sean Devereux Park	500
