= 2025–26 Combined Counties Football League =

Combined Counties Football League
- Season: 2025–26

The 2025–26 Combined Counties Football League season (known as the 2025–26 Cherry Red Records Combined Counties Football League for sponsorship reasons) was the 48th in the history of the Combined Counties Football League, a football competition in England. The league consisted of four divisions: the Premier North, the Premier South, Division One and Division Two. Division Two (details beyond the scope of this article) was intended largely for reserve and U23 sides, although it was also open to first teams.

The constitution was announced on 15 May 2025. The two Premier Divisions (step 5) promote two clubs each; one each as champions and one each via a four-team play-off.

== Premier Division North ==
Premier Division North remained at 20 clubs, after Egham Town and Bedfont Sports were promoted to step 4, Risborough Rangers were transferred to the Spartan South Midlands League Premier Division, and Berks County and Wembley were relegated to Division One.

Five new clubs joined the division:

- One promoted from Division One:
  - Windsor & Eton
- One promoted from Hellenic League Division One:
  - Abingdon United
- One relegated from the Isthmian League South Central Division:
  - Ashford Town (Middlesex)
- Two relegated from Southern League Division One Central:
  - Kidlington
  - North Leigh

=== League table ===
Pos	Team	Pld	W	D	L	GF	GA	GD	Pts	Promotion, qualification or relegation
1	Ashford Town (Middlesex) (C, P)	38	25	6	7	89	40	+49	81	Promoted to the Isthmian League South Central Division
2	Windsor & Eton (O, P)	38	23	11	4	81	30	+51	80	Qualified for the play-offs
3	Ardley United	38	23	6	9	74	34	+40	75	Qualified for the play-offs
4	Broadfields United	38	22	9	7	75	38	+37	75	Qualified for the play-offs
5	Burnham	38	21	8	9	68	39	+29	71	Qualified for the play-offs
6	Reading City	38	20	7	11	68	50	+18	67	
7	North Greenford United	38	20	7	11	74	63	+11	67	
8	Wallingford & Crowmarsh	38	19	8	11	61	53	+8	65	
9	Kidlington	38	13	15	10	52	48	+4	54	
10	Virginia Water	38	14	9	15	65	68	−3	51	Transferred to Premier Division South
11	Wokingham Town	38	14	8	16	63	60	+3	50	
12	Abingdon United	38	13	9	16	63	70	−7	48	
13	Milton United	38	14	6	18	64	73	−9	48	Resigned to the Oxfordshire Senior League Premier Division (Note: Milton United resigned from the league at the end of the season after failing to agree a new lease on their ground.)
14	British Airways	38	13	8	17	57	55	+2	44 (Note: British Airways had three points deducted. The club resigned from the league at the end of the season.)	Resigned and folded at the end of the season
15	Harefield United	38	11	8	19	63	75	−12	41	
16	Hilltop	38	12	5	21	71	94	−23	41	
17	Holyport	38	9	3	26	33	89	−56	30	
18	North Leigh	38	7	6	25	43	84	−41	27	
19	Amersham Town	38	6	8	24	35	82	−47	26	Reprieved from relegation
20	Edgware & Kingsbury (R)	38	6	3	29	43	97	−54	21	Relegated to Division One

Source: CCL Prem Div North Table
Rules for classification: 1) points; 2) goal difference; 3) number of goals scored.
(C) Champions; (O) Play-off winners; (P) Promoted; (R) Relegated

=== Play-offs ===
Semi-finals
2	Windsor & Eton	1
5	Burnham	0
3	Ardley United	1 (2)
4	Broadfields United	1 (3)

Final
2	Windsor & Eton	2
4	Broadfields United	0

==== Semifinals ====
28 April 2026	Ardley United	0–0 (2–3 p)	Broadfields United	Ardley
19:30		Report		Stadium: The Playing Fields; Attendance: 324; Referee: Samuel Palmer; Assistant referees: Edward Hall & James Bentley; Fourth official: Coby Woodley

28 April 2026	Windsor & Eton	1–0	Burnham	Windsor
19:45	Shakespeare 57'	Report		Stadium: Stag Meadow; Attendance: 833; Referee: Ethan Stacey; Assistant referees: Lewis Walmesley-Browne & James Field; Fourth official: Bailey Wood

==== Final ====
2 May 2026	Windsor & Eton	2–0	Broadfields United	Windsor
19:45 GMT	Mazzone 45'; Phillips 66'	Report		Stadium: Stag Meadow; Attendance: 1,331; Referee: Dylan Ing; Assistant referees: Andre Johnson-Small & Nathan Parrin; Fourth official: Daniel Harvey

=== Results table ===
Home \ Away	ABU	AME	ARD	ASH	AIR	BRF	BUR	E&K	HAR	HLT	HOL	KID	MIL	NGU	NLE	REA	VIR	W&C	W&E	WOK
Abingdon United	—	2–0	0–3	1–3	2–0	3–2	3–3	3–0	1–0	2–1	3–0	1–3	0–3	2–3	2–0	1–3	1–1	1–2	2–2	3–1
Amersham Town	1–1	—	2–0	0–3	1–1	0–4	1–0	1–0	1–9	2–2	1–2	0–2	1–3	1–4	0–3	2–2	0–2	1–3	0–0	3–0
Ardley United	0–0	1–0	—	0–2	4–0	2–2	1–4	1–0	1–0	8–0	2–0	2–1	5–1	4–1	3–1	1–0	4–0	5–1	1–0	0–1
Ashford Town (Middlesex)	2–3	3–1	1–2	—	1–1	4–3	3–4	4–1	2–1	5–4	4–1	2–3	2–0	5–1	2–0	1–0	0–0	4–2	2–2	4–0
British Airways	3–2	2–0	0–1	0–2	—	0–1	0–1	3–2	0–1	13–0	0–0	1–1	0–4	1–1	6–1	0–2	2–1	2–1	0–2	2–3
Broadfields United	4–0	3–1	2–1	0–1	0–1	—	1–1	4–0	9–0	3–2	2–0	2–1	1–1	0–2	2–1	3–2	2–1	2–0	1–1	1–1
Burnham	1–0	3–1	4–1	1–3	2–1	1–1	—	4–0	3–0	5–0	2–0	1–0	3–0	1–2	2–0	3–2	2–0	1–1	1–1	1–1
Edgware & Kingsbury	2–2	0–2	0–1	0–2	0–1	1–3	1–1	—	1–0	0–7	1–2	1–1	3–5	0–3	3–2	3–1	4–6	2–1	0–2	2–5
Harefield United	2–2	3–0	0–4	0–3	1–3	1–2	5–1	2–0	—	3–2	3–1	1–1	3–4	2–1	3–2	2–2	0–1	2–2	2–2	0–1
Hilltop	2–0	4–2	2–2	0–3	4–0	1–2	1–0	2–1	4–2	—	5–0	1–2	1–2	0–3	3–2	1–2	2–4	2–3	0–2	2–2
Holyport	3–0	2–1	0–4	0–3	1–3	0–1	2–5	2–1	0–3	3–1	—	1–0	1–1	0–3	0–1	0–3	0–3	1–4	0–0	1–5
Kidlington	3–1	0–0	1–1	1–1	1–1	0–0	0–1	2–1	3–3	2–2	2–1	—	2–0	1–1	3–1	1–3	1–0	1–1	1–2	3–2
Milton United	0–2	3–2	1–2	0–3	1–1	2–2	1–0	5–3	1–2	1–3	1–0	3–0	—	3–1	3–3	1–2	2–0	0–1	1–2	1–5
North Greenford United	3–3	1–1	0–2	2–0	3–2	0–2	2–0	3–2	3–2	2–2	2–3	3–2	6–2	—	3–0	2–2	1–3	1–1	2–1	2–0
North Leigh	1–6	2–1	1–1	2–5	0–2	0–2	1–0	5–1	1–1	1–3	2–0	1–3	0–0	0–1	—	0–1	2–2	1–0	0–4	2–4
Reading City	4–3	2–1	2–1	1–1	2–1	3–0	0–1	2–0	2–1	3–0	5–1	2–2	3–0	4–0	1–0	—	2–5	0–2	1–4	0–4
Virginia Water	2–2	1–3	1–1	1–0	1–1	0–4	0–0	2–1	3–1	1–4	5–0	0–0	3–2	1–2	4–2	0–1	—	0–3	0–6	2–2
Wallingford & Crowmarsh	5–2	0–0	2–1	2–1	2–0	2–0	2–0	0–1	1–1	2–0	2–1	0–0	2–1	3–2	2–2	1–0	3–2	—	0–3	0–4
Windsor & Eton	2–0	3–0	1–0	0–2	2–1	1–1	1–2	5–3	4–1	2–0	5–2	4–1	3–1	5–0	1–0	0–0	2–1	3–0	—	1–1
Wokingham Town	0–1	6–1	0–1	0–0	1–2	0–1	0–3	0–2	1–0	2–1	0–2	0–1	0–4	0–2	4–0	1–1	3–6	3–2	0–0	—

Source: CCL Prem Div North Results Grid
Legend: Blue = home team win; Yellow = draw; Red = away team win.
For upcoming matches, an "a" indicates there is an article about the rivalry between the two participants.

=== Stadia and locations ===
Location of the clubs in the 2025–26 Combined Counties League Premier Division North (Berkshire, Buckinghamshire, and Oxfordshire)
Location of the clubs in the 2025–26 Combined Counties League Premier Division North (Greater London)

Club	Location	Stadium	Capacity
Abingdon United	Abingdon-on-Thames	The Northcourt	2,000
Amersham Town	Amersham	Spratleys Meadow	1,500
Ardley United	Ardley	The Playing Fields	1,000
Ashford Town (Middlesex)	Ashford	Robert Parker Stadium	2,550
British Airways	Greenford	Berkeley Fields (Note: Groundshare with North Greenford United)	2,000
Broadfields United	Harrow	Tithe Farm Sports & Social Club (Note: Groundshare with Rayners Lane)	1,000
Burnham	Burnham	The 1878 Stadium	2,500
Edgware & Kingsbury	Kingsbury	Silver Jubilee Park	1,990
Harefield United	Harefield	Preston Park	1,200
Hilltop	Kingsbury	Silver Jubilee Park (Note: Groundshare with Hendon)	1,990
Holyport	Maidenhead	Summerleaze Village	1,000
Kidlington	Kidlington	Yarnton Road	1,500
Milton United	Milton	Potash Lane	1,000
North Greenford United	Greenford	Berkeley Fields	2,000
North Leigh	North Leigh	Eynsham Hall Park Sports Ground	2,000
Reading City	Reading	Rivermoor Stadium	2,000
Virginia Water	Slough	Arbour Park (Note: Groundshare with Slough Town)	2,000
Wallingford & Crowmarsh	Wallingford	Hithercroft	1,500
Windsor & Eton	Windsor	Stag Meadow	4,500
Wokingham Town	Wokingham	Lowther Road	1,000

== Premier Division South ==
Premier Division South remained at 20 clubs after AFC Whyteleafe and Jersey Bulls were promoted to step 4; and Sandhurst Town and Spelthorne Sports were relegated to Division One.

Four new clubs joined the division:

- Two relegated from the Isthmian League South Central Division:
  - Badshot Lea
  - Sutton Common Rovers
- One relegated from Southern League Division One South:
  - Thatcham Town
- One promoted from Division One:
  - Eversley & California

=== League table ===
Pos	Team	Pld	W	D	L	GF	GA	GD	Pts	Promotion, qualification or relegation
1	Cobham (C, P)	38	30	5	3	126	27	+99	95	Promoted to the Isthmian League South Central Division
2	Tadley Calleva	38	23	7	8	74	44	+30	75 (Note: Tadley Calleva had one point deducted)	Qualified for the play-offs
3	Tooting & Mitcham United	38	21	10	7	68	55	+13	73	Qualified for the play-offs
4	Fleet Town	38	19	9	10	72	51	+21	66	Qualified for the play-offs
5	Horley Town (O, P)	38	21	3	14	65	48	+17	66	Qualified for the play-offs
6	Knaphill	38	20	6	12	73	47	+26	63 (Note: Knaphill had three points deducted)	
7	Abbey Rangers	38	19	6	13	52	47	+5	63	
8	Redhill	38	16	12	10	66	55	+11	60	
9	Sheerwater	38	16	6	16	73	72	+1	54	
10	Badshot Lea	38	12	13	13	75	61	+14	49	
11	Corinthian-Casuals	38	12	10	16	48	61	−13	46	
12	Sutton Common Rovers	38	13	5	20	54	55	−1	44	
13	Epsom & Ewell	38	11	11	16	52	63	−11	44	
14	Alton	38	11	9	18	56	72	−16	42	
15	Thatcham Town	38	13	3	22	45	70	−25	42	Transferred to Premier Division North
16	Balham	38	9	9	20	50	81	−31	36	
17	Chipstead	38	9	9	20	50	88	−38	36	
18	Eversley & California	38	9	9	20	45	84	−39	36	
19	Camberley Town	38	7	14	17	38	64	−26	35	Reprieved from relegation
20	Guildford City (R)	38	8	6	24	48	85	−37	30	Relegated to the Southern Combination League Division One

Source: CCL Prem Div South Table
Rules for classification: 1) points; 2) goal difference; 3) number of goals scored.
(C) Champions; (O) Play-off winners; (P) Promoted; (R) Relegated

=== Play-offs ===
Semi-finals
2	Tadley Calleva	0
5	Horley Town	3
3	Tooting & Mitcham United	2
4	Fleet Town	4

Final
4	Fleet Town	2
5	Horley Town	4

==== Semifinals ====
18 April 2026	Tadley Calleva	0–3	Horley Town	Tadley
15:00		Report	Allen 8', 90+1'; Shephard 81' (pen.)	Stadium: Barlows Park; Attendance: 390; Referee: Jake Martin; Assistant referees: Phillip Wrightam & Ashley Carley; Fourth official: Fidelis Akanga

18 April 2026	Tooting & Mitcham United	2–4	Fleet Town	Mitcham
15:00	Obisanya 90+2', 90+3'	Report	Postance 20'; Burke 45+2'; MacAllister 56', 80'	Stadium: Imperial Fields; Attendance: 774; Referee: Jake Smyes; Assistant referees: Gareth Mays & Michael Heavey; Fourth official: Jack Healy

==== Final ====
25 April 2026	Fleet Town	2–4	Horley Town	Fleet
15:00 GMT	Burke 81'; MacAllister 86'	Report	Abdulazeez 37'; Desanges 51'; Sheppard 69'; Pearch 90+7'	Stadium: Calthorpe Park; Attendance: 1,189; Referee: Nigel Owen; Assistant referees: Mohammed Shahib Shohel & Gareth Davis; Fourth official: Adam Jones

=== Results table ===
Home \ Away	ABB	ALT	BSL	BAL	CAM	CHI	COB	COR	E&E	E&C	FLE	GUI	HOR	KNA	RED	SHE	SCR	TAD	THA	TMU
Abbey Rangers	—	1–1	1–0	0–1	1–0	3–1	0–5	0–0	0–2	3–1	2–1	4–0	3–2	0–0	2–1	1–4	2–1	1–0	2–1	1–2
Alton	1–2	—	3–3	1–1	2–0	2–3	1–2	3–2	2–2	3–0	2–2	3–0	1–3	0–2	2–1	2–2	1–0	0–2	1–2	1–2
Badshot Lea	2–3	2–2	—	1–0	0–0	3–4	0–1	3–1	0–0	5–3	4–1	2–2	2–1	2–1	2–2	2–3	4–2	0–2	2–0	2–2
Balham	0–2	3–0	0–3	—	2–2	0–2	0–8	1–3	0–1	2–3	0–0	2–1	1–3	3–2	1–3	2–3	2–3	2–2	3–1	1–1
Camberley Town	1–2	2–1	0–0	2–3	—	0–0	1–3	2–1	2–1	2–2	1–2	0–3	1–1	0–1	0–0	2–0	1–1	2–2	0–2	1–3
Chipstead	2–1	2–3	3–1	0–4	0–2	—	0–5	6–0	1–1	1–1	0–1	3–0	0–2	1–1	3–2	1–3	1–1	0–2	0–1	1–1
Cobham	2–1	3–1	1–1	5–0	5–0	12–1	—	1–2	2–0	6–1	1–2	5–2	2–0	3–0	1–1	5–1	3–1	5–0	5–0	2–0
Corinthian-Casuals	2–2	5–1	2–2	1–1	1–1	1–3	1–3	—	2–1	1–0	2–0	3–0	1–2	0–3	1–1	2–1	0–0	0–3	4–1	0–2
Epsom & Ewell	1–1	3–0	0–6	3–1	0–0	3–1	0–4	2–2	—	1–1	3–0	3–0	1–1	2–2	1–2	2–2	0–1	1–0	4–0	0–1
Eversley & California	1–0	1–1	1–8	1–2	0–0	2–2	0–6	0–1	3–1	—	0–3	4–3	2–1	0–2	3–0	1–2	3–1	1–4	0–1	0–0
Fleet Town	1–0	2–3	2–1	3–1	3–3	3–0	2–2	3–0	3–2	3–0	—	3–1	3–0	1–1	1–1	4–1	1–0	1–1	3–1	2–3
Guildford City	1–2	0–1	2–2	3–1	0–2	4–1	1–1	4–2	1–2	3–0	0–5	—	2–5	2–1	1–2	0–2	2–4	1–3	2–0	0–4
Horley Town	1–2	2–0	2–1	1–3	1–0	5–1	0–2	3–2	4–0	2–1	1–0	3–1	—	1–2	3–1	2–1	3–1	0–1	0–1	1–1
Knaphill	2–0	2–3	4–2	1–0	3–4	1–0	2–3	2–0	1–0	2–2	0–1	1–0	2–0	—	1–5	1–0	2–0	2–3	1–2	1–3
Redhill	1–0	4–1	2–1	2–2	6–0	2–1	0–1	0–0	2–2	1–1	1–1	2–2	3–1	0–6	—	4–2	3–2	3–0	1–0	1–2
Sheerwater	1–2	2–1	2–1	3–0	6–2	1–1	0–0	1–2	3–4	3–1	4–0	1–1	0–3	1–5	3–2	—	0–1	2–5	4–1	2–4
Sutton Common Rovers	2–1	1–3	1–3	2–2	2–0	4–1	2–3	0–1	6–0	4–0	2–1	0–0	0–1	0–1	0–1	0–2	—	3–0	2–1	0–1
Tadley Calleva	1–0	2–0	1–1	6–1	2–1	2–1	2–1	2–0	2–1	2–3	2–2	2–0	1–2	1–1	3–0	2–2	2–0	—	2–0	3–0
Thatcham Town	0–2	1–1	1–1	1–1	2–1	6–0	1–3	1–0	2–1	0–1	3–2	1–2	0–2	2–6	0–1	2–1	2–0	1–3	—	2–3
Tooting & Mitcham United	2–2	3–2	3–0	2–1	0–0	2–2	0–4	0–0	2–1	2–1	2–4	3–1	2–0	0–5	2–2	1–2	1–4	3–1	3–2	—

Source: CCL Prem Div South Results Grid
Legend: Blue = home team win; Yellow = draw; Red = away team win.
For upcoming matches, an "a" indicates there is an article about the rivalry between the two participants.

=== Stadia and locations ===
Location of the clubs in the 2025–26 Combined Counties League Premier Division South (Surrey)
Location of the clubs in the 2025–26 Combined Counties League Premier Division South (Hampshire)

Club	Location	Stadium	Capacity
Abbey Rangers	Addlestone	Addlestone Moor	1,000
Alton	Alton	Anstey Park	2,000
Badshot Lea	Wrecclesham	Westfield Lane	1,200
Balham	Mitcham	Imperial Fields (Note: Groundshare with Tooting & Mitcham United)	3,500
Camberley Town	Camberley	Krooner Park	1,976
Chipstead	Chipstead	High Road	2,000
Cobham	Cobham	Leg O'Mutton Field	2,000
Corinthian-Casuals	Tolworth	King George's Field	2,700
Epsom & Ewell	Cobham	Leg O'Mutton Field (Note: Groundshare with Cobham)	2,000
Eversley & California	Eversley	Fox Lane	1,000
Fleet Town	Fleet	Calthorpe Park	2,000
Guildford City	Guildford	Spectrum Football Ground	1,320
Horley Town	Horley	The New Defence	1,800
Knaphill	Knaphill	Redding Way	1,000
Redhill	Redhill	Kiln Brow	2,000
Sheerwater	Sheerwater	Eastwood Centre	600
Sutton Common Rovers	Carshalton	War Memorial Sports Ground (Note: Groundshare with Carshalton Athletic)	5,000
Tadley Calleva	Tadley	Barlows Park	1,000
Thatcham Town	Thatcham	Waterside Park	1,500
Tooting & Mitcham United	Mitcham	Imperial Fields	3,500

== Division One ==
Division One was increased from 23 to 24 clubs after Windsor & Eton were promoted to Premier Division North, Eversley & California were promoted to Premier Division South, Belstone were transferred to Spartan South Midlands League Division One, and Yateley United were transferred to Wessex League Division One.

Five new clubs joined the division:

- Two relegated from Premier Division North:
  - Berks County
  - Wembley
- Two relegated from Premier Division South:
  - Sandhurst Town
  - Spelthorne Sports
- One promoted from the Middlesex County League:
  - Sport London e Benfica

=== League table ===
Pos	Team	Pld	W	D	L	GF	GA	GD	Pts	Promotion, qualification or relegation
1	Penn & Tylers Green (C, P)	44	32	8	4	112	57	+55	104	Promoted to Premier Division North
2	Bedfont (O, P)	44	31	2	11	120	57	+63	95	Qualified for the play-offs
3	Brook House	44	28	5	11	112	80	+32	89	Qualified for the play-offs
4	Woodley United	44	25	10	9	96	59	+37	85	Qualified for the play-offs
5	Wembley	44	26	4	14	89	53	+36	82	Qualified for the play-offs
6	PFC Victoria London	44	24	9	11	95	63	+32	81	
7	Berks County	44	25	5	14	120	67	+53	80	
8	London Samurai Rovers	44	23	9	12	83	59	+24	78	
9	Holmer Green	44	23	8	13	114	63	+51	77	
10	Westside	44	21	8	15	95	71	+24	68 (Note: Westside had three points deducted)	
11	Colliers Wood United	44	17	10	17	66	71	−5	61	
12	Hillingdon Borough	44	17	7	20	99	108	−9	58 (Note: On 8 April 2026, Hillingdon Borough announced their intention to resign from the league at the end of the season and fold.)	Resigned and folded at the end of the season
13	Langley	44	15	9	20	97	108	−11	54	
14	Oxhey Jets	44	16	6	22	75	88	−13	54	
15	Sport London e Benfica	44	16	9	19	79	98	−19	57	
16	Staines & Lammas (Middlesex)	44	15	5	24	73	97	−24	50	
17	Molesey	44	12	9	23	68	88	−20	45	
18	Spelthorne Sports	44	10	8	26	63	94	−31	38	
19	Spartans Youth	44	10	8	26	61	94	−33	38	
20	Sandhurst Town	44	10	6	28	58	107	−49	36	Transferred to the Wessex League Division One
21	FC Deportivo Galicia	44	10	8	26	64	118	−54	35 (Note: FC Deportivo Galicia had three points deducted)	
22	Rising Ballers Kensington	44	9	6	29	64	143	−79	33	Reprieved from relegation
23	Chalfont St Peter (R)	44	7	9	28	59	119	−60	30	Relegated to the Thames Valley Premier League Premier Division
24	Windsor	0	0	0	0	0	0	0	0 (Note: Windsor resigned from the league on 23 July 2025 without playing a match.)	Resigned from the league

Source: CCL Div One Table
Rules for classification: 1) points; 2) goal difference; 3) number of goals scored.
(C) Champions; (O) Play-off winners; (P) Promoted; (R) Relegated

=== Play-offs ===
Semi-finals
2	Bedfont	1
5	Wembley	0
3	Brook House	0 (4)
4	Woodley United	0 (3)

Final
2	Bedfont
3	Brook House

==== Semifinals ====
25 April 2026	Bedfont	1–0	Wembley	Bedfont
15:00	McCalmon 78'	Report		Stadium: The Orchard; Attendance: 165; Referee: Stephen Hawkes; Assistant referees: Edwards Clifford & Brian Capel; Fourth official: Ryan Hetherington

25 April 2026	Brook House	0–0 (4–3 p)	Woodley United	Hayes
15:00		Report		Stadium: Farm Park; Attendance: 260; Referee: Lawrence Attoh; Assistant referees: Dominic De Silva & Derrick Coe; Fourth official: Kacper Ignatiuk

==== Final ====
2 May 2026	Bedfont	2–1 (a.e.t.)	Brook House	Bedfont
15:00 GMT	Kavanagh 90+13'; Smith 112'	Report	Mensah 16'	Stadium: The Orchard; Attendance: 489; Referee: Jamaal Horne; Assistant referees: Steven Williams & Michael Heavey; Fourth official: Albert Warr

=== Results table ===
Home \ Away	BED	BER	BKH	CSP	CWU	DGA	HLB	HMG	LAN	LSR	MOL	OXJ	PTG	PVL	RBK	SAN	SPY	SPE	SLB	S&L	WEM	WES	WOO
Bedfont	—	3–0	5–1	3–0	3–1	3–0	7–1	2–4	4–1	3–0	2–0	2–1	1–1	1–2	5–0	2–0	3–0	3–4	1–3	3–0	3–0	6–2	1–2
Berks County	4–2	—	7–3	6–1	1–0	4–3	6–4	1–1	1–3	0–0	4–1	5–0	0–1	3–0	4–1	4–0	3–2	3–2	4–0	8–2	0–1	2–0	6–2
Brook House	3–2	1–2	—	6–0	3–2	2–1	6–3	2–2	4–0	1–1	1–1	3–2	1–7	1–1	3–5	5–1	1–1	2–1	3–0	3–0	2–1	4–1	3–2
Chalfont St Peter	1–2	2–3	2–6	—	2–2	3–3	1–1	1–4	2–4	2–0	1–0	2–1	0–0	2–4	2–3	1–2	2–1	0–1	2–1	0–5	0–1	1–2	2–2
Colliers Wood United	0–1	1–0	0–3	4–0	—	2–2	4–1	1–0	2–0	1–4	2–2	3–3	1–2	1–1	1–0	3–5	2–0	5–4	2–2	4–2	2–0	0–0	0–3
FC Deportivo Galicia	1–4	0–5	1–4	2–2	1–2	—	1–4	1–3	2–3	0–1	3–2	1–2	4–3	2–0	2–1	1–0	1–0	2–2	0–5	1–1	2–1	3–2	3–1
Hillingdon Borough	3–1	2–1	2–4	1–0	1–1	4–1	—	1–1	2–0	1–3	3–1	2–5	5–1	1–3	0–1	2–3	0–5	3–1	3–3	5–3	3–1	4–5	1–2
Holmer Green	3–3	3–2	4–0	5–1	2–0	5–1	4–2	—	3–4	1–3	3–1	5–2	0–1	0–0	6–0	2–0	2–0	2–0	2–3	2–0	0–2	1–2	2–2
Langley	2–0	2–2	0–3	3–1	3–4	1–1	2–2	2–6	—	2–4	0–1	2–2	5–6	2–3	3–1	2–0	1–2	3–2	3–0	3–0	3–5	2–4	2–5
London Samurai Rovers	1–2	4–3	3–1	2–0	4–1	2–0	3–3	2–3	2–1	—	1–1	0–1	1–3	2–2	3–0	1–0	2–1	2–2	5–0	4–1	0–2	3–0	1–2
Molesey	0–1	3–2	0–3	0–0	0–1	4–3	3–2	4–3	4–4	2–1	—	1–4	0–1	0–1	1–3	3–3	0–0	0–2	7–0	1–3	1–4	2–2	1–2
Oxhey Jets	2–3	0–2	0–4	1–0	1–0	2–1	1–0	0–5	4–4	7–1	0–1	—	0–3	0–1	3–4	2–3	3–2	3–1	2–3	2–2	4–1	0–2	2–2
Penn & Tylers Green	5–2	1–0	6–2	2–2	2–1	3–2	5–3	1–1	3–2	2–0	3–0	3–0	—	3–3	5–2	1–0	1–0	3–0	4–3	3–0	3–0	0–1	0–0
PFC Victoria London	1–2	2–2	1–2	5–1	0–1	5–2	1–2	1–0	5–4	0–0	3–2	2–1	0–2	—	9–2	0–1	2–2	5–2	3–4	3–0	1–2	3–1	3–1
Rising Ballers Kensington	0–5	1–6	2–3	1–1	0–2	1–1	2–4	1–9	1–5	0–1	0–2	0–2	2–3	2–3	—	1–1	3–2	0–0	0–1	6–4	2–5	0–0	1–4
Sandhurst Town	1–5	3–4	0–2	1–6	5–2	2–2	0–2	0–6	0–1	2–4	0–4	0–3	0–1	3–4	2–3	—	3–2	0–2	2–2	5–0	1–0	0–3	2–3
Spartans Youth	1–5	2–1	2–4	4–0	2–0	3–1	1–6	2–0	3–4	3–3	3–2	2–2	0–2	1–3	2–5	0–0	—	2–1	0–1	0–0	1–4	1–3	1–2
Spelthorne Sports	1–2	1–2	2–1	3–1	0–1	1–3	2–5	3–4	1–2	0–1	1–1	0–1	1–4	0–2	2–2	2–2	2–1	—	3–0	1–1	2–2	0–3	1–2
Sport London e Benfica	2–3	1–4	3–0	5–2	1–1	3–0	3–0	2–3	3–3	2–2	1–3	0–3	2–2	0–2	3–1	3–2	2–0	1–2	—	0–1	0–3	3–3	1–1
Staines & Lammas (Middlesex)	3–2	3–2	0–1	6–1	0–2	5–1	2–2	2–1	2–0	0–3	2–3	2–0	2–4	1–2	3–1	2–1	6–1	0–1	1–3	—	0–3	2–1	4–3
Wembley	0–2	1–0	0–1	6–4	1–1	4–0	3–0	1–1	2–0	0–1	5–1	1–0	3–0	0–2	7–1	1–0	2–3	4–1	2–1	3–0	—	1–0	1–1
Westside	0–1	1–1	2–4	3–2	1–0	7–0	1–2	3–0	3–3	0–2	2–1	5–0	4–4	2–1	8–2	1–2	4–0	3–2	4–1	1–0	1–2	—	2–2
Woodley United	0–4	1–0	2–0	2–3	3–0	4–2	4–1	1–0	1–1	1–0	1–3	2–1	1–2	0–0	5–0	7–0	0–0	5–1	6–0	1–0	2–1	1–0	—

Source: CCL Div One Results Grid
Legend: Blue = home team win; Yellow = draw; Red = away team win.
For upcoming matches, an "a" indicates there is an article about the rivalry between the two participants.

=== Stadia and locations ===
Location of the clubs in the 2025–26 Combined Counties League Division One (Berkshire and Buckinghamshire)
Location of the clubs in the 2025–26 Combined Counties League Division One (Greater London)

Club	Location	Stadium	Capacity
Bedfont	Bedfont	The Orchard	1,200
Berks County	Ascot	Ascot Racecourse (Note: Groundshare with Ascot United)	1,150
Brook House	Hayes	Farm Park	2,000
Chalfont St Peter	Chalfont St Peter	Mill Meadow	1,500
Colliers Wood United	Wimbledon	Wibbandune Sports Ground	2,000
FC Deportivo Galicia	Bedfont	Bedfont Recreation Ground (Note: Groundshare with Bedfont Sports)	3,000
Hillingdon Borough	Ruislip	Middlesex Stadium	3,587
Holmer Green	Holmer Green	Watchet Lane	
Langley	Slough	Arbour Park (Note: Groundshare with Slough Town)	2,000
London Samurai Rovers	Hanworth	Rectory Meadow (Note: Groundshare with Hanworth Villa)	1,000
Molesey	West Molesey	Walton Road	4,000
Oxhey Jets	South Oxhey	The Boundary Stadium	2,000
Penn & Tylers Green	Penn	French School Meadow	900
PFC Victoria London	Ashford	Robert Parker Stadium (Note: Groundshare with Ashford Town (Middlesex))	2,550
Rising Ballers Kensington	Northwood	Northwood Park (Note: Groundshare with Northwood)	3,075
Sandhurst Town	Sandhurst	Bottom Meadow	1,950
Spartans Youth	Bedfont	The Orchard (Note: Groundshare with Bedfont)	1,200
Spelthorne Sports	Ashford	Spelthorne Sports Club	1,000
Sport London e Benfica	Amersham	Spratleys Meadow (Note: Groundshare with Amersham Town)	1,500
Staines & Lammas (Middlesex)	Ashford	Spelthorne Sports Club (Note: Groundshare with Spelthorne Sports)	1,000
Wembley	Wembley	Vale Farm	2,450
Westside	Wimbledon	Wibbandune Sports Ground (Note: Groundshare with Colliers Wood United)	2,000
Woodley United	Tilehurst, Reading	Rivermoor Stadium (Note: Groundshare with Reading City)	2,000
