= Kasper Hok =

Bangladeshi footballer (born 2003)

Personal information
- Full name: Ekramul Kasper Hok
- Date of birth: 5 January 2003 (age 23)
- Place of birth: Vilnius, Lithuania
- Height: 1.87 m (6 ft 1 1/2 in)
- Positions: Centre-back; defensive midfielder

Youth career
- 2019–2021: Thatcham Town
- 2022–2025: University of Portsmouth

Senior career*
Years	Team	Apps	(Gls)
2023–2024	Woodley United		
2024–2025	Wokingham Town		
2025	Windsor & Eton	0	(0)
2025	→ Woodley United (loan)	4	(1)
2025–2026	Woodley United	12	(1)
2026	Brothers Union	1	(0)
2026–	Binfield	0	(0)
2026–	→Yateley United (dual-registration)	1	(0)
- * Club domestic league appearances and goals as of 6 March 2026

Ekramul Kasper Hok (Bengali: একরামুল ক্যাসপার হক; 5 January 2003) is a professional footballer who last played as a centre-back for Bangladesh Football League club Brothers Union.

== Early life ==
Born on 5 January 2003 in Vilnius, Lithuania, to a Bangladeshi father and a Lithuanian mother, Kasper moved to England, where he began his football career with Thatcham Town U18 in 2019. He also attended the University of Portsmouth, where he continued his career, while also playing domestic football in south-eastern England.

== Club career ==
=== Early career ===
Kasper debuted in the Combined Counties Football League Division One for Woodley United during the 2023–24 season, scoring his first goal in a 5–1 victory over Holmer Green on 9 January 2024. In 2024, he joined Wokingham Town in the Combined Counties Premier Division North, scoring in a 3–1 defeat to Windsor & Eton in the Berks & Bucks Senior Cup on 10 September 2024. In August 2025, Kasper joined Windsor & Eton, and on 29 August 2025, he returned to Woodley United on a 28-day loan, later making the move permanent. During his second spell at Woodley, he made 16 league appearances, scoring 2 goals, including a stoppage-time winner against Oxhey Jets in a 2–1 victory on 27 September 2025. His final appearance for the club came on 31 January 2026 against Holmer Green.

=== Brothers Union ===
On 31 January 2026, Kasper moved to Bangladesh, signing his first professional contract with Bangladesh Football League club Brothers Union. On 6 March, he made his professional debut against Bangladesh Police FC, playing 88 minutes in a 1–1 draw at District Stadium, Mymensingh. He left the club after his only appearance.

== International career ==
In 2025, Kasper participated in the BFF Next Global Star event, organized by the Bangladesh Football Federation (BFF), held from 28 to 30 June.

In September 2025, he was selected for the Bangladesh U23 for the 2026 AFC U-23 Asian Cup qualification. However, he was unable to attend the team camp due to the delay in obtaining a Bangladeshi passport before the camp commenced. In December 2025, Kasper was chosen by the BFF for the AFB Latin-Bangla Super Cup 2025, an exhibition tournament organized by AF Boxing Promotion. He represented the "Red Green Future Star" team, a squad consisting of U17 internationals and expatriate players, in matches against the São Bernardo U18 team from Brazil and Atletico Charlone from Argentina.

== Career statistics ==
=== Club ===
As of 6 March 2026.

Appearances and goals by club, season and competition
Club	Season	League			Domestic Cup		Other		Continental		Total	
Club	Season	Division	Apps	Goals	Apps	Goals	Apps	Goals	Apps	Goals	Apps	Goals
Brothers Union	2025–26	BFL	1	0	0 (Note: Appearance(s) in Bangladesh Federation Cup)	0	0 (Note: Appearance(s) in Bangladesh Independence Cup)	0	—		1	0
Career total			1	0	0	0	0	0	0	0	1	0
