= Goran Babić =

English footballer (born 2003)

Personal information
- Date of birth: 10 September 2003 (age 23)
- Place of birth: Hammersmith, England
- Height: 1.69 m (5 ft 7 in)
- Position: Central midfielder

Team information
- Current team: Farnborough
- Number: 19

Youth career
- –2015: Brentford
- 2015–2023: Southampton

Senior career*
Years	Team	Apps	(Gls)
2024	Jedinstvo Ub	1	(0)
2024–2025	London Samurai Rovers	10	(3)
2025–2026	Braintree Town	30	(1)
2026–	Farnborough	5	(0)
- * Club domestic league appearances and goals as of 21:56, 22 October 2026 (UTC)

Goran Babić (born 10 September 2003) is an English footballer who plays as a central midfielder for National League South club Farnborough.

Babić is a product of the Southampton and Brentford academies and began his senior career with Serbian club Jedinstvo Ub in 2024. After an abortive spell, he moved into non-League football.

== Club career ==
=== Youth years ===
Babić began his academy career with Brentford and transferred to the Southampton Academy in 2015. He was developed from a forward into a "ball-winning" central midfielder and progressed to sign a two-year scholarship in 2020. Babić impressed sufficiently to sign a two-year professional contract in June 2021, but he was released when it expired at the end of the 2022–23 season. Babić remained a free agent for the duration of the 2023–24 season.

=== Jedinstvo Ub ===
On 12 June 2024, Babić signed an undisclosed-length contract with Serbian SuperLiga club Jedinstvo Ub on a free transfer. He made just one appearance for the club before his unannounced departure, as a substitute in a 4–0 SuperLiga defeat to Partizan on 27 July 2024.

=== Non-League football ===
In December 2024, Babić began making appearances for Combined Counties League First Division club London Samurai Rovers. He made 12 appearances and scored three goals during the remainder of the 2024–25 season. Babić transferred to National League club Braintree Town in August 2025. He made 36 appearances and scored one goal during the 2025–26 season, which culminated in relegation. Babić transferred to National League South club Farnborough in September 2026.

== International career ==
Babić was called into the Serbia U16 squad for two friendly matches in February 2019, but did not appear in either matchday squad.

== Personal life ==
Babić is of Serbian descent.

== Career statistics ==
As of match played 17 October 2026

Appearances and goals by club, season and competition
Club	Season	League			National cup (Note: Includes Serbian Cup, FA Cup)		Other		Total	
Club	Season	Division	Apps	Goals	Apps	Goals	Apps	Goals	Apps	Goals
Jedinstvo Ub	2024–25	Serbian SuperLiga	1	0	0	0	―		1	0
London Samurai Rovers	2024–25	Combined Counties League First Division	10	3	―		2 (Note: Appearances in Combined Counties League First Division Challenge Cup)	0	12	3
Braintree Town	2025–26	National League	30	1	2	0	4 (Note: Appearances in National League Cup)	0	36	1
Farnborough	2026–27	National League South	5	0	2	0	0	0	7	0
Career total			46	4	4	0	6	0	56	4
