= Windsor and Eton =

Windsor and Eton are twin towns, in the English county of Berkshire, separated by the River Thames and joined by Windsor Bridge. The towns are sometimes treated as one (for example in the naming of the local railway stations), and sometimes as separate entities.

For more information see the separate articles:

- Windsor
- Eton

== See also ==
- Windsor & Eton Central railway station
- Windsor & Eton Riverside railway station
- Windsor & Eton F.C.
