= Fleet Town F.C. =

Association football club in England

Coordinates: 51°16′35″N 0°51′0″W

Fleet Town
- Full name: Fleet Town Football Club
- Nickname: The Blues
- Founded: 1890
- Ground: Calthorpe Park, Fleet
- Capacity: 2,000 (250 seated)
- Chairman: Darren McGrath
- Manager: Jamie McClurg
- League: Combined Counties League Premier Division South
- 2025–26: Combined Counties League Premier Division South, 4th of 20
Home colours	Away colours

Fleet Town Football Club is a semi-professional football club based in Fleet, Hampshire, England. The club are currently members of the Combined Counties League Premier Division South and play at Calthorpe Park.

== History ==
The club was established in 1890 under the name Fleet Football Club. With two Saturday teams, they played in both the Aldershot Senior League and the Basingstoke & District League. A young Clement Attlee, future Prime Minister of the United Kingdom, played for the club in the early 20th century. In 1961 the club joined Division Three of the Hampshire League. Although they won the division in their first season in the league, earning promotion to Division Two, the following season saw them relegated back to Division Three. In 1963 the club adopted its current name, and a third-place finish in 1963–64 saw the club promoted back to Division Two at the first attempt.

In 1965–66 Fleet were Division Two champions, earning promotion to Division One. The following season saw the club make its debut in the FA Cup, reaching the second qualifying round, before losing 3–0 to Horsham. They were Division One runners-up in 1972–73, but after finishing bottom of Division One in 1975–76, they were relegated to Division Two. The club were Division Two runners-up in 1977–78, after which they joined the Athenian League. However, due to difficulties meeting the ground grading regulations, the club dropped into the Combined Counties League in 1984. After finishing bottom of the league for two consecutive seasons, they dropped into the Surrey Premier League for the 1986–87 season, which also saw them finish bottom of the table.

Fleet then joined the Premier Division of the Chiltonian League in 1987. After two seasons in the Chiltonian League, they moved up to the Wessex League. The club won the league in 1994–95 and were promoted to the Southern Division of the Southern League. They won the Russell Cotes Cup in 1997–98. After being transferred to the Eastern Division in 1999, they finished bottom of the division in 1999–2000 and were relegated back to the Wessex League. In 2000–01 the club were Wessex League runners-up and were promoted back to the Eastern Division of the Southern League. The following season saw them win the Russell Cotes Cup again. After finishing bottom of the Eastern Division in 2003–04, they were saved from relegation due to restructuring of the non-League pyramid and were transferred to Division One of the Isthmian League. League restructuring in 2006 saw them placed in Division One South.

In 2006–07 Fleet finished fifth in the division, qualifying for the promotion play-offs. However, they were beaten 2–1 by Tooting & Mitcham United in the semi-finals. The season also saw them win the Russell Cotes Cup for a third time, a trophy they retained in the two following seasons. They were transferred to Division One South & West of the Southern League for the 2007–08 season. The club went on to finish as runners-up in the division, but lost 2–1 to Uxbridge in the play-off semi-finals. They were subsequently moved back to Division One South of the Isthmian League for the 2008–09 season.

A third-place finish by Fleet in 2008–09 resulted in another play-off campaign, in which they lost 1–0 to Metropolitan Police in the semi-finals. The season also saw them win the Hampshire Senior Cup with a 1–0 win over VT in the final. In 2011 the club were transferred to Division One Central of the Southern League. In 2011–12 they finished in the relegation zone, but were reprieved after Bedfont Town resigned from the league. In 2013 they were moved to Division One South & West, and finished in the relegation zone in 2013–14, receiving another reprieve from relegation. The club were transferred back to Division One Central in 2015. At the end of the 2017–18 season they were transferred to Division One South. The club finished bottom of the division in 2018–19 and were relegated to the Premier Division of the Wessex League. Following the 2020–21 season they were transferred to the Premier Division South of the Combined Counties League.

In 2024–25 Fleet finished fifth in the Premier Division South, before losing on penalties to Jersey Bulls in the play-off semi-finals. They finished fourth the following season, going on to beat [[Tooting & Mitcham United F.C.|Tooting & Mitcham United]] in the play-off semi-finals and then losing 4–2 to Horley Town in the final.

== Ground ==
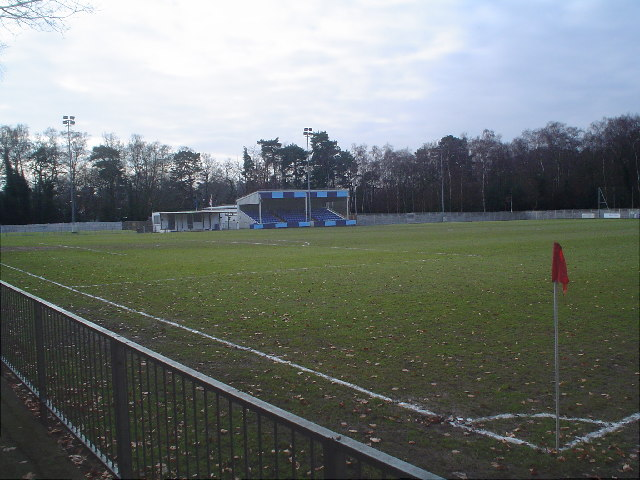
The club's home ground, showing the new stand which replaced the one destroyed by fire in 1992

The club initially played at the Views (now Campbells Close), before moving to Watsons Meadow. In 1923 the club were granted the use of a site on Crookham Road by Lord Calthorpe, with the ground becoming known as Calthorpe Park. The first match at the new ground was played on 3 March 1923. Floodlights were installed in 1953. The ground currently has a capacity of 2,000, of which 250 is seated and covered.

== Honours ==
- Wessex League
  - Champions 1994–95
- Hampshire League
  - Division Two champions 1965–66
  - Division Three champions 1961–62
- Hampshire Senior Cup
  - Winners 2008–09
- Russell Cotes Cup
  - Winners 1997–98, 2002–03, 2006–07, 2007–08, 2008–09
- North Hants FA Cup
  - Winners 2008–09, 2009–10
- Basingstoke Senior Cup
  - Winners 2005–06, 2007–08, 2009–10
- Aldershot Senior Cup
  - Winners 1992–93, 1994–95, 1995–96, 1999–00, 2007–08, 2008–09, 2009–10
- Southern Counties Midweek Floodlit Cup
  - Winners 1994–95, 2001–02
- Simpsonair Challenge Shield
  - Winners 1991–93, 1993–94

== Records ==
- Best FA Cup performance: Third qualifying round, 2007–08, 2008–09
- Best FA Trophy performance: First round, 1998–99, 1999–2000
- Best FA Vase performance: Fifth round, 2024–25
- Biggest victory: 15–0 vs Petersfield United, Wessex League, 26 December 1994
- Heaviest defeat: 7–0 vs Bashley, Southern League Eastern Division, 12 April 2004
- Record Attendance: 1,336 vs AFC Wimbledon, Isthmian League Division One, 8 January 2005
- Most appearances: Mark Frampton, 428
- Most goals: Mark Frampton, 250
- Record transfer fee paid: £3,000 to Aldershot for Mark Russell

== See also ==
- Fleet Town F.C. players
- Fleet Town F.C. managers
