= British Airways F.C. =

Association football club in England

Coordinates: 51°32′52″N 0°20′20″W

British Airways
- Full name: British Airways Football Club
- Founded: 1947
- Dissolved: 2026
- Ground: Berkeley Fields, Greenford
- Chairman: Rob Pearce
- Manager: Shaun Ryan
- League: Combined Counties League Premier Division North
- 2025–26: Combined Counties League Premier Division North, 14th of 20 (resigned)
Home colours	Away colours

British Airways Football Club was a football club based in Greenford, Greater London, England. They are lastly members of the Combined Counties League Premier Division North and played at Berkeley Fields, groundsharing with North Greenford United until summer 2026.

== History ==
The first mention of the club is from April 1947 when it was the works team of British Overseas Airways Corporation (BOAC). In 1982 the BOAC team merged with the works team of British European Airways (the BOAC and BEA companies had merged in 1974) to form British Airways Football Club. At the time of the merger, the club had over 200 members, fielding 15 adult teams. The Saturday team played in the West Middlesex League and then the London Commercial League. The club were one of the most successful in the league, winning the Division One title and League Cup several times, the Middlesex Premier Cup in 1996–97 and the Middlesex County Intermediate Cup a record nine times.

After winning the Intermediate Cup in three consecutive seasons from 2004–05 to 2006–07, the club entered a team into the Middlesex County League, joining Division Three (Hounslow & District), which they finished bottom of in 2007–08. In 2011 league reorganisation saw them moved up to Division Two. In 2012–13 the club's first team transferred from the London Commercial League to the Middlesex County League Premier Division, with the team in Division Two becoming British Airways Thirds. The first team won the Premier Division at the first attempt. After winning the league title again in 2017–18, they were promoted to Division One of the Combined Counties League.

In 2023–24 British Airways were runners-up in Division One, qualifying for the promotion play-offs. After beating Rising Ballers Kensington 2–0 in the semi-finals, they defeated Berks County on penalties in the final, earning promotion to the Premier Division North. In 2026 the club announced it was to change its name following a request from British Airways after the company withdrew its support in 2024. At the end of the 2025–26 season the club withdrew from the Combined Counties League.

== Ground ==
The club originally played at the Concorde Centre in Cranford. When they joined the Combined Counties League, they began groundsharing with Bedfont at the Orchard. In 2024 they moved to the Spelthorne Sports Club to groundshare with Spelthorne Sports. The club relocated to North Greenford United's Berkeley Field ground in 2025.

== Honours ==
- Middlesex County League
  - Premier Division champions 2012–13, 2017–18
- Middlesex Premier Cup
  - Winners 1996–97
- Middlesex Intermediate Cup
  - Winners 2004–05, 2005–06, 2006–07

== Records ==
- Best FA Cup performance: Extra-preliminary round, 2024–25, 2025–26
- Best FA Vase performance: Second round, 2021–22
