= Shepherd's Bush F.C. (2021) =

Association football club in England

Coordinates: 51°35′36″N 0°37′47″W

Shepherd's Bush
- Full name: Shepherd's Bush Football Club
- Founded: 2012, as A.F.C. Hillgate; 2021, as Shepherd's Bush
- Ground: Holloways Park, Beaconsfield
- League: Combined Counties League Division One
- 2025–26: Combined Counties League Division One, 22nd of 23 (relegated)
Home colours

Shepherd's Bush Football Club is a semi-professional football club originally in London, England. They are currently members of the Combined Counties League Division One and play their home games at Beaconsfield Town's Holloways Park.

== History ==
=== Rising Ballers Kensington ===
Established as A.F.C. Hillgate in 2012, the club joined the Middlesex County League. In 2013–14 they finished third in Division Two, earning promotion to Division One Central and East. After finishing sixth in Division One Central and East in 2014–15, they switched to Division Two of the Spartan South Midlands League. A fifth-place finish in 2015–16 saw them promoted to Division One. In the summer of 2016 they were renamed Kensington Borough. At the end of the 2016–17 season the club were moved to Division One of the Combined Counties League. At the end of the 2018–19 season, the club was renamed Kensington & Ealing Borough. Prior to the 2022–23 season, the club was renamed Rising Ballers Kensington. They finished fifth in Division One in 2023–24, qualifying for the promotion play-offs in which they lost 1–0 to British Airways in the semi-finals.

=== Shepherd's Bush ===
Shepherd's Bush were formed in 2021, competing in the Middlesex Football League. Ahead of the 2026–27 season, Rising Ballers Kensington were re-constituted as Shepherd's Bush, remaining in the Combined Counties League Division One.

== Ground ==
Having previously played at the Linford Christie Stadium in White City, the club moved to Avenue Park Stadium in Greenford for the 2015–16 season. They moved to Spratleys Meadow in Amersham for the 2016–17 season and then to the Orchard in Bedfont for the following season. Prior to the 2018–19 season the club relocated to Leatherhead's Fetcham Grove. They moved to Grand Drive, home of Raynes Park Vale, in October 2019. Prior to the 2020–21 season the club agreed a groundshare with Hanwell Town, moving to Reynolds Field in Perivale.

In 2022, the club relocated to North Greenford United's Berkeley Fields ground. In 2025, they moved to Northwood's Northwood Park. Prior to the 2026–27 season, Shepherd's Bush entered a groundsharing agreement with Beaconsfield Town to play at Holloways Park.

== Records ==
- Best FA Cup performance: Preliminary round, 2021–22
- Best FA Vase performance: Second round, 2018–19

== See also ==
- Rising Ballers Kensington F.C. players
