= FC Deportivo Galicia =

Association football club in England

Coordinates: 51°27′36″N 0°25′37″W

- Full name: FC Deportivo Galicia
- Nickname: Depor
- Founded: 1968
- Ground: Bedfont Recreation Ground, Bedfont
- Capacity: 3,000
- Chairman: Ino Canto
- Manager: Leo Decabo, José Andón
- League: Combined Counties League Division One
- 2024–25: Combined Counties League Division One, 23rd of 23
- Website: https://www.fcdeportivogalicia.com/

Football Club Deportivo Galicia is a football club based in London, England. They are currently members of the Combined Counties League Division One and play at the Bedfont Recreation Ground in Bedfont, groundsharing with Bedfont Sports.

== History ==
The club was established in 1968 under the name Centro Gallego and joined the West Fulham League. A split during the 1971–72 season saw another club formed under the name FC Deportivo Galicia, with the two clubs merging under the latter name in 1975, at which point they were playing in the Harlesden Sunday League.

Deportivo Galicia switched to Saturday football when they joined Division Two of the Middlesex County League in 1995. The club went on to win the division at the first attempt, earning promotion to Division One. They were Division One runners-up the following season and were promoted to the Premier Division. Although the club finished bottom of the Premier Division in 1997–98, they were not relegated to the (renamed) Senior Division. They finished bottom of the division again in 2006–07 and 2008–09, but avoided being relegated on both occasions.

In 2016–17 Deportivo Galicia were Premier Division champions, earning promotion to Division One of the Combined Counties League. The 2021–22 season saw the club win the Middlesex Premier Cup, beating Bedfont & Feltham 5–1 in the final, and the Surrey Saturday Premier Cup, beating Nottsborough 3–1 in the final.

== Ground ==
The club have played at several grounds, including CB Hounslow United's Osterley Sports Club. In 2015 they moved to Edgware Town's Silver Jubilee Park, before relocating to the Bedfont Recreation Ground the following year.

== Honours ==
- Middlesex County League
  - Premier Division champions 2016–17
  - Division Two champions 1995–96
- Middlesex Premier Cup
  - Winners 2021–22
- Surrey Premier County Cup
  - Winners 2021–22

== Records ==
- Best FA Vase performance: First round, 2018–19
