= Staines & Lammas (Middlesex) F.C. =

Association football club in England

Coordinates: 51°24′31″N 0°29′13″W

- Full name: Staines & Lammas (Middlesex) Football Club
- Nickname: Lammas or The Blue Swans
- Founded: 1926
- Ground: Spelthorne Sports Club, 296 Staines Road West, Ashford Common, Ashford, Middlesex, TW15 1RY
- Capacity: 1500
- Chairman: Oliver Ellery
- Manager: Russell Taylor
- League: Combined Counties League Division One
- 2025–26: Combined Counties League Division One, 16th of 23
Home colours	Away colours

Staines & Lammas (Middlesex) Football Club is a football club based in the town of Staines-upon-Thames. The club is affiliated to the Middlesex Football Association. They currently play in the Combined Counties League Division One.

== Etymology ==
The club's name comes from its original location in Staines - initially playing at the Lammas Recreation Ground (distinguishing itself from the previously established Staines Town F.C.).

== History ==
Staines Lammas Football Club was founded in 1926 and took its name from the park land adjacent to the River Thames in Staines, Middlesex (now known as Staines-upon-Thames).

In 1927 the Club became members of the Hounslow & District League and finished runners-up in Division 2 in 1929 earning promotion to Division 1. By 1932 the club were members of the South-West Middlesex League Division 1 and added a Reserve Team in Division 2 of the Richmond & District League. In 1936 the club were finalists in the Staines Hospital Cup. A year later the Club finished as champions of the South-West Middlesex League Division 1 and earned promotion to the Intermediate Division where they remained until after the Second World War. By 1948 the Reserve Team had switched to the Hounslow & District League Division 2. In 1955 the club also entered a team in Division 1 of the Staines & District League.

In the mid-1980s the Club moved to the Laleham Recreation Ground and changed its affiliation to the Woking League (which subsequently became the Guildford & Woking Alliance League) under the jurisdiction of the Surrey County Football Association. The Club remains affiliated to both the Middlesex and Surrey County Football Associations.

The club made steady progress through the football league pyramid, eventually gaining promotion to the Surrey County Intermediate League (Western). The Club progressed through the divisions and won the Middlesex Intermediate Cup in season 2000–01 and the Division One title in season 2001–02 (there was no Premier Division at the time).

In 2000–01 the Club completed the development of its new Sports Pavilion with the financial support of local businesses and grants from the Football Association and Sport England. It was a notable success at the time and represented the first such grant awarded by Sport England in the Borough of Spelthorne. Promotion to the Surrey County Senior League followed in season 2002–03.

In season 2003–04 the Surrey Senior League amalgamated with the Combined Counties Football League forming Division One, the existing clubs forming the Premier Division. The Club settled into mid-table security and at the start of the 2006–07 season following the appointment of Nathan Wharf as its manager (former manager of Ashford Town (Middx.) Football Club) success followed.

That season the Southern Combination Cup was shared with Merstham Football Club when a date for the Final could not be agreed. In season 2007–08 the club were champions of Division One and achieved the double in 2008–9 by retaining the title and winning the Division One League Cup.

Unable to be promoted to the Premier Division as it could not meet the necessary ground grading requirements having been refused planning permission to install floodlights, the Club at the start of the 2009–10 season entered into a ground share with Ashford Town (Middx.) Football Club.

The Club entered the FA Vase for the first time in season 2010–11 and the FA Cup likewise in season 2011–12, reaching the first qualifying round losing 3–2 in a thrilling match away to Chesham United.

In season 2011–12 the Club won both the Middlesex and Surrey County Football Associations Saturday Premier Cups.

After careful consideration the Club decided to return its former home at the Recreation Ground, Laleham at the start of the 2015–16 season. In 2020 the club received planning permission for its long quest of obtaining floodlights.

The club was renamed Staines & Lammas (Middlesex) Football Club on the 1st of July 2022, after the withdrawal of Staines Town F.C. from senior men's football.

== Ground ==
The club initially played at the recreation ground in Wraysbury Road, Staines, known officially as the Ashby Recreation Ground, but universally known locally as the Lammas. During the 1970s, the club spent several seasons playing elsewhere: at Littleton Recreation Ground (1975/6; in Laleham Road, Shepperton, next to Shepperton Studios), and at Laleham Park (1976/7 to at least 1981/2; in Riverside Road, Laleham). Having spent its prior existence hiring grounds owned by the local authority, the club moved to a new home at the Laleham Village Recreation Ground located off Broadway, Laleham. This ground, a former home of Staines Town FC, is on land owned by the Lucan Estates, and through the club's efforts a smart modern building known as the Lucan Pavilion was financed and constructed there at the turn of the millennium. However, the lack of floodlights began to hamper the club's ambitions for promotion, and so from 2009, First Team games were hosted at the Short Lane during a groundsharing agreement with Ashford Town (Middlesex) FC. This came to an end in 2015, with a return to the Lucan Pavilion, where planning permission was eventually granted for lights and a small stand. These plans met with great hostility from the local residents, however, and in summer 2023, one year after adopting its new name, the club took the difficult decision to leave, and were forced out of the borough for the first time, sharing the Abbey Rangers facilities at The Moors (50 Addlestone Moor, Addlestonemoor, near Addlestone, Surrey, KT15 2QH). Two years later, Staines & Lammas (Middlesex) moved again, this time to 296 Staines Road West, Ashford Common, Ashford, Middlesex, TW15 1RY, the home ground of Spelthorne Sports Club, whilst the second team ("Under 23s") began playing at Thamesmead School, Manygate Lane, Shepperton, TW17 9EE.

== Honours ==
- Combined Counties Football League Division One
  - Champions 2007–08, 2008–09
- Surrey FA Saturday Premier Cup :
  - Winners 2011–12
- Combined Counties Football League Division One Cup:
  - Runners-up (1): 2012–13

== Records ==
- FA Cup
  - First Qualifying Round 2011–12
- FA Vase
  - First Qualifying Round 2010–11, 2011–12
