= PFC Victoria London =

Association football club in England

Coordinates: 51°25′58.76″N 0°23′47.71″W

- Full name: Polish Football Club Victoria London
- Founded: 1 July 2016; 10 years ago
- Ground: Robert Parker Stadium, Stanwell
- Capacity: 2,550 (250 seated)
- Chairman: Tom Ruchniewicz
- Manager: Mateusz Czekalski & Seweryn Kowalczewski
- League: Combined Counties League Division One
- 2025–26: Combined Counties League Division One, 6th of 23
- Website: PFC Victoria London on X
Home colours

PFC Victoria London is a football club based in Feltham, London, England. They are currently members of the Combined Counties League Division One and play at Robert Parker Stadium, groundsharing with Ashford Town.

== History ==
PFC Victoria London were formed on 1 July 2016, as a club for the Polish community in the United Kingdom. Upon formation, the club joined the Middlesex County League, winning Division Two in their debut season. In the 2017–18 season, PFC Victoria London won Division One (West), gaining promotion to the Middlesex County Premier Division. PFC London Victoria entered the FA Vase for the first time in 2019–20.

In 2024, the club was admitted into the Combined Counties League Division One, following promotion from the Middlesex County League.

== Ground ==
The club currently groundshare with Ashford Town at Robert Parker Stadium.

== Honours ==
- Middlesex County League
  - Division Two champions: 2016–17
  - Division One (West) champions: 2017–18
- Polish Football Championships in Great Britain
  - The SPK General Wladislaw Anders Trophy: 2023

== Records ==
- Best FA Vase performance: First qualifying round, 2019–20
- Record attendance: 350 vs North Acton, Middlesex County League Division One (West), 7 October 2017
