= Westside F.C. (England) =

Association football club in England

Westside
- Full name: Westside Football Club
- Founded: 1996
- Ground: Wibbandune (Colliers Wood Utd)
- Chairman: Graham Holder
- Manager: Steve Walters
- League: Combined Counties League Division One
- 2025–26: Combined Counties League Division One, 10th of 23
- Website: https://www.westsidefc.org.uk/home

Westside Football Club multi team (Adult and Youth) football club based in Wandsworth, Greater London, England.

The 1st Team are members of the Combined Counties League Division One and play their home games at Colliers Wood United's Wibbandune Ground on the A3.

The Reserve Team are members of the Surrey South Eastern Combination, Intermediate Division 1 and play their home games at Chessington and Hook United's Chalky Lane Ground.

The A Team (3rds) are members of the Surrey South Eastern Combination, Junior Division 3 and play their home games at Oberon Playing Fields.

== History ==
The club was established in May 1996 as a Christian club representing West Side Church in Wandsworth. They later joined the Surrey South Eastern Combination. In 2014–15 the club were Division Two champions, earning promotion to Division One. The following season saw them win the Division One title and were promoted to the Surrey Elite Intermediate League. In 2018–19 the club applied for promotion to Division One of the Combined Counties League, with a fourth-place finish being enough for the club to move up to Division One of the Combined Counties League.

For the start of the 2021-22 season they were transferred to Division One of the Southern Counties East League, where they finished 16th.

For the start of the 2022-23 season the club they applied to be transferred back to the Combined Counties League with an 11th-place finish.

== Honours (Recent) ==
- Surrey South Eastern Combination
  - Intermediated Division One - Champions 2015–16 (1st Team)
  - Intermediated Division Two - Champions 2014–15 (1st Team)
  - Junior Division Five - Champions 2021-22 (A Team)
  - Intermediated Division Two - Champions 2022-23 (Reserve Team)

== Records ==
- Best FA Cup performance: Preliminary round, 2020–21
- Best FA Vase performance: First round, 2019–20, 2026–27

== Longest Serving Players ==
- Alex Dowdeswell, 27 Years, debut August 1996
