= Hilltop F.C. =

English football club

Coordinates: 51°35′13″N 0°26′33″W

Hilltop
- Full name: Hilltop Football Club
- Founded: 2005; 21 years ago
- Ground: Silver Jubilee Park, Hendon
- Capacity: 3,500
- Chairman: Abdigani Ahmed
- Manager: Abdullah Mohamed
- League: Combined Counties League Premier Division North
- 2025–26: Combined Counties League Premier Division North, 16th of 20
Home colours	Away colours

Hilltop Football Club is a football club based in Stonebridge, London, England. They are currently members of the Combined Counties League Premier Division North and groundshare with Hendon FC at Silver Jubilee Park.

== History ==
In 2005, Hilltop were formed as a club for the Somali diaspora in North West London. In 2007, the club joined the Middlesex County League Division Three. In 2010, Hilltop left the league, rejoining in 2014. In 2019, Hilltop won the Middlesex County League Division One, joining the Premier Division in the process. In 2021, the club was admitted into the Combined Counties League Division One. Hilltop entered the FA Vase for the first time in 2021–22 and the FA Cup in 2022–23.

== Ground ==
The club currently groundshare with Hendon FC at Silver Jubilee Park.

== Honours ==
- Middlesex County League
  - Division One West Champions 2018–19
  - Division Two Champions 2017–18
- Middlesex County FA - Junior Cup
  - Champions 2018–19

== Records ==
- Best FA Vase performance: Fifth Round, 2023–24
