= Spartans Youth F.C. =

Football club in Brentford, England

Coordinates: 51°36′2.52″N 0°24′56.65″W

Spartans Youth
- Full name: Spartans Youth Football Club
- Founded: 2006; 20 years ago
- Ground: The Orchard, Bedfont
- Capacity: 1200
- Chairman: Mark Stow
- Manager: Mark Stow
- League: Combined Counties League Division One
- 2025–26: Combined Counties League Division One, 19th of 23
- Website: https://www.pitchero.com/clubs/spartansyouthfootballclub2
Home colours

Spartans Youth Football Club is a football club based in Brentford, England. They are currently members of the Combined Counties League Division One and play at The Orchard, Bedfont.

== History ==
Spartans Youth were formed in 2006 by Mark Stow. In 2017, Spartans Youth joined the Surrey Elite Intermediate League from the Middlesex County League. In 2022, the club was admitted into the Combined Counties League Division One.

== Non-playing staff ==
As of 10 June 2024

Position	Staff
Manager	Mark Stow
Assistant Manager	Brandon Ramus

Source: https://www.pitchero.com/clubs/spartansyouthfootballclub2/contact

== Ground ==
The club previously played at Northwood Park, Northwood, groundsharing with Northwood FC. In April 2024, the club announced that at the end of the 2023–24 season, they would move to Bedfont FC's ground, the Orchard, for the start of the 2024–25 season. This move would situate the team closer to its base in Brentford.

== Records ==
- FA Vase
  - Second qualifying round 2026-27
