= Edgware & Kingsbury F.C. =

Association football club in England

Coordinates: 51°34′36″N 0°15′15″W

Edgware & Kingsbury
- Full name: Edgware & Kingsbury Football Club
- Nickname: The Wares
- Founded: 1939
- Ground: Silver Jubilee Park, Kingsbury
- Capacity: 1,990 (298 seated)
- Chairman: Antony Manzi
- Manager: Vacant
- League: Combined Counties League Division One
- 2025–26: Combined Counties League Premier Division North, 20th of 20 (relegated)
Home colours	Away colours

Edgware & Kingsbury Football Club is a football club from Edgware, London Borough of Barnet, England. Established in 1939, they are currently members of the Combined Counties League Division One and play at Silver Jubilee Park in Kingsbury, about three miles from the club's original ground, the White Lion in Edgware.

== History ==
The club was founded in 1939 by a group of football enthusiasts who worked for the construction and engineering firm, William Moss & Sons based in Cricklewood. The firm had taken over the sports ground located in the High Street, formerly used by Edgware Rugby Club. The club initially played in the West Middlesex Combination, winning the league title in 1939–40. The league was renamed the Middlesex Senior League in 1940, with the club winning the league title again in 1943–44, before sharing the title with Twickenham the following season. They joined the London League for the 1945–46 season and were placed in the Western Section, which they went on to win. They subsequently lost the championship play-off against Eastern Section winners Woolwich Polytechnic. The club joined the Corinthian League for the following season.

In 1947–48 Edgware won the Middlesex Senior Cup with a 2–1 win against Enfield in the final. In 1953–54 they finished as runners-up in the league and won the league's Memorial Shield, defeating champions Carshalton Athletic in the final. The club won the Memorial Shield for a second time in the 1962–63 season, beating Wokingham Town in a two-legged final. However, at the end of the season the Corinthian League was disbanded and alongside most of the other clubs in the league, they joined the new Division One of the Athenian League. They finished third in their first season, and were promoted to the Premier Division. In 1966–67 they finished bottom of the division, and were relegated to Division One. This was followed by a second successive relegation to Division Two as they finished bottom of Division One in 1967–68.

In 1972 the club was renamed Edgware. Division Two was abolished in 1977 as the Athenian League was reduced to a single division. They finished as runners-up in 1981–82, but were not promoted to the Isthmian League as their White Lion Ground did not meet the ground grading requirements. When the Athenian League disbanded altogether in 1984 they joined the London Spartan League, before changing their name back to Edgware Town in 1987. They won the Premier Division of the Spartan League and the League Cup in 1987–88. After a second title in 1989–90, the club were promoted to Division Two North of the Isthmian League. After league reorganisation in 1991 they were placed in Division Three, which they won in its first season, earning promotion to Division Two. They were relegated back to Division Three at the end of the 2000–01 season, which was renamed Division Two the following year.

In 2006 the now-renamed Division Two was disbanded and Edgware were transferred to the Premier Division of the Spartan South Midlands League. They won it at the first attempt, also winning the Premier Cup and the Challenge Trophy. The club was promoted to Division One North of the Isthmian League, but were forced to close down at the end of the Isthmian League season due to lack of funds, following the decision of the local authority to grant planning permission for their ground, leaving the club unable to confirm a home ground for the 2008–09 season after their main sponsor and benefactor decided to withdraw support, putting the club's lease of the White Lion ground in jeopardy. However, although the club did not play a match for six years, it did not formally fold; FA registration was maintained and the club remained non-playing members of the Middlesex Football Association.

In March 2014 it was announced that the club was to start playing again. They subsequently joined Division One of the Spartan South Midlands League for the 2014–15 season. In the 2015–16 season the club won the Division One title by ten points and were promoted to the Premier Division. At the end of the 2020–21 season they were transferred to the Premier Division North of the Combined Counties League. In 2022 the club was renamed Edgware & Kingsbury. They finished bottom of the Premier Division North in 2025–26 and were relegated to DIvision One.

== Ground ==
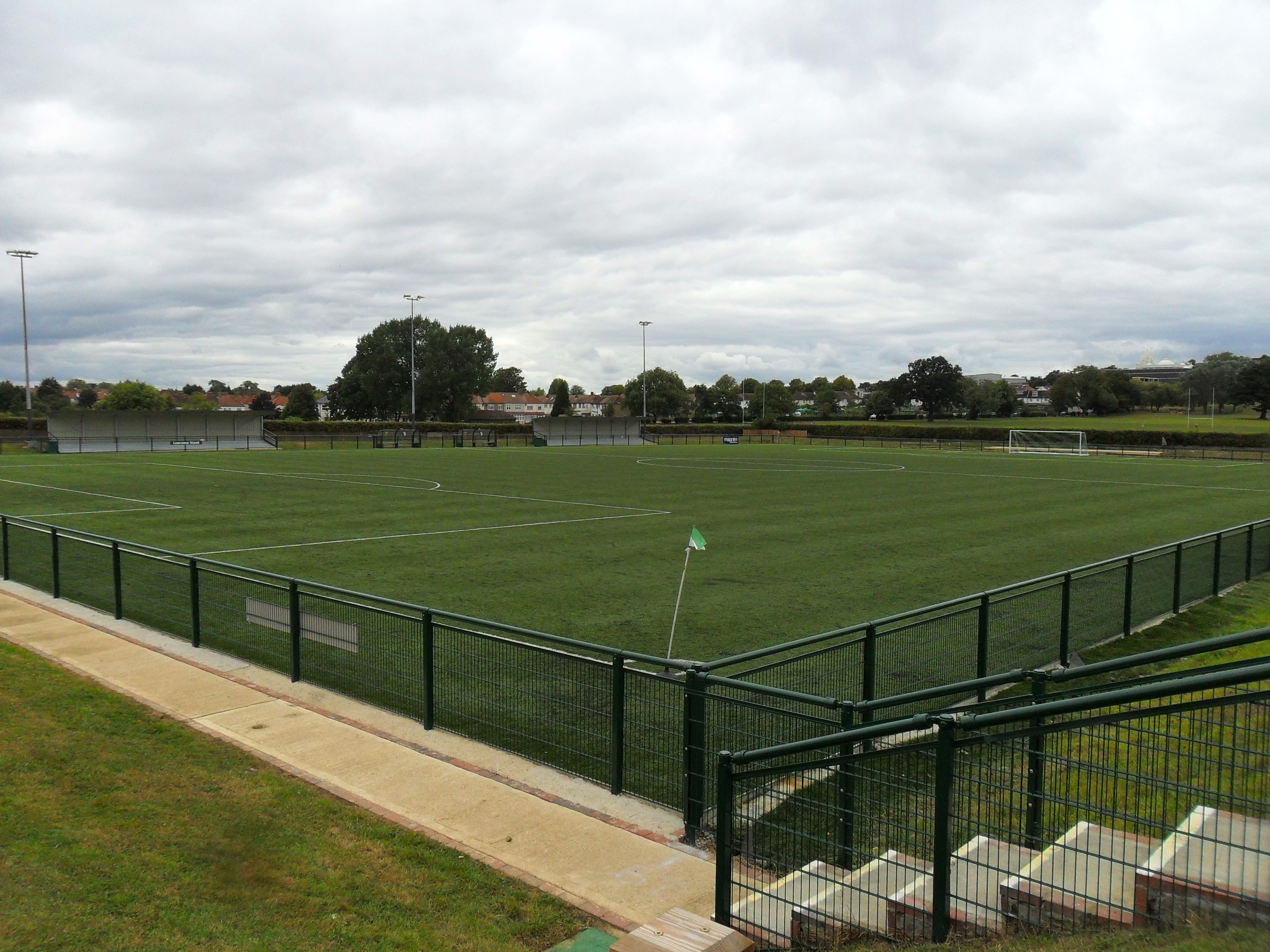
Silver Jubilee Park in September 2016

For most of its existence, the club played at the White Lion ground in Edgware from 1939, with the ground taking its name from the adjacent White Lion pub. The ground's record attendance of 8,500 was set in October 1947 for an FA Cup second qualifying round match against local rivals Wealdstone, who themselves later played at the White Lion Ground between 1995 and 2005 after losing their Lower Mead ground. In 1964 the pitch was levelled, but this led to drainage problems that caused numerous matches to be postponed. Floodlights were installed in 1979, paid for by the sale of striker Brian Stein to Luton Town, while the sale of goalkeeper Dave Beasant to Wimbledon funded other improvements. A new main stand was built in 1984 after the original wooden stand had burned down. The White Lion pub was demolished in 1997 and replaced by a hotel, and the club was eventually forced to close in 2008 when their main benefactor withdrew financial support and the ground was lost to commercial redevelopment. The site freehold was bought by Barrett Homes, with planning permission having already been granted to build flats on the site by Harrow Council in 2006. The site of the former stadium is now occupied by a residential development named Zodiac Close.

Upon reforming in 2014, the club moved to Silver Jubilee Park in Kingsbury (the former home of Kingsbury Town), although they played the opening games of the 2014–15 season at Underhill Stadium while Silver Jubilee Park was undergoing refurbishment. The ground has five stands; the 180-seat main stand, a 118-seat stand behind a goal and three covered terraces. The ground's capacity is 1,990.

== Honours ==
- Isthmian League
  - Division Three champions 1991–92
- Spartan South Midlands League
  - Premier Division champions 2006–07
  - Division One Champions 2015–16
  - Premier Cup winners 2006–07
  - Challenge Cup winners 2006–07
- London League
  - Western Section champions 1945–46
- London Spartan League
  - Premier Division champions 1987–88, 1989–90
  - League Cup winners 1987–88
- Corinthian League
  - Memorial Shield winners 1952–53, 1963–63
- Middlesex Senior League
  - Champions 1939–40, 1943–44, 1944–45 (shared)
- Middlesex Senior Cup
  - Winners 1947–48

== Records ==
- Best FA Cup performance: Fourth qualifying round, 1978–79
- Best FA Trophy performance: Second qualifying round, 1974–75
- Best FA Vase performance: Fifth round, 1991–92
- Record attendance: 8,500 vs Wealdstone, FA Cup second qualifying round, October 1947

== See also ==
- Edgware & Kingsbury F.C. players
