= Tooting & Mitcham United F.C. =

Association football club in England

Tooting & Mitcham United
- Full name: Tooting & Mitcham United Football Club
- Nicknames: The Terrors, The Stripes
- Founded: 1932; 94 years ago
- Ground: Imperial Fields
- Capacity: 3,500 (612 seated)
- Chairman: Dean Morgan
- Manager: Jamie Byatt
- League: Combined Counties League Premier Division South
- 2025–26: Combined Counties League Premier Division South, 3rd of 20
- Website: www.tmunited.org
Home colours	Away colours

Tooting & Mitcham United Football Club is an association football club based in the London Borough of Merton. They are currently members of the Combined Counties League Premier Division South and play at Imperial Fields in Morden. Their nickname is "the Terrors" or "the Stripes".

== History ==
In 1932, local neighbours Tooting Town FC (founded 1887) and Mitcham Wanderers FC (founded 1912) merged to become Tooting and Mitcham FC, representing the two areas. Their merger had been mooted for two years previously, but it was only after it became clear that the area could not host two competitive teams from a commercial point of view, that anything happened to advance it. United was added to the club name in 1935. Originally playing in white shirts, in 1956 the broad black and white stripes that are still worn today were adopted.

The club has reached the FA Cup proper on 10 occasions, the last time being the 2009–10 season. It has also won the Isthmian League twice, in 1958 and 1960. Other honours include the Surrey Senior Cup which the club has won nine times and the London Senior Cup which the club has won eight times.

Perhaps the most famous FA Cup run was in 1959, when the club reached the third round; drawn at home to First Division Nottingham Forest, on a frozen pitch they went into a 2-goal lead with goals from Grainger and Murphy before Forest fought back with the aid of a Murphy own goal and a penalty. Forest won the replay 3–0 in front of a crowd of 42,362 and went on to win the trophy that year. A British Pathe newsreel features this game.

Alex Stepney, who was born in Mitcham in 1942, joined the club in 1958. In 1963 he signed for Millwall and later played for Chelsea, Manchester United and England. Dario Gradi, who spent more than twenty four years as manager of Crewe Alexandra, briefly played for the club in the 1960s.

Tooting enjoyed a more sustained period of FA Cup glory in the 1970s. In 1974–75, they reached the first round proper for the first time since 1963–64 and were drawn at home against Crystal Palace, who played just five miles down the road and were in Football League Division 3. The game was played at Tooting's Sandy Lane ground on 27 November 1974, a Wednesday afternoon, in front of a packed crowd of, according to The Times, 10,000. A Crystal Palace side which included Terry Venables, Peter Taylor and Alan Whittle won 2–1. Tooting's goal was scored by Steve Grubb.

In 1975–76, Tooting went three steps further reaching the fourth round proper, the last 32. They beat Romford 1–0 in the first round proper and Leatherhead 2–1 after a replay in the second. In the third round they triumphed over Football League opposition defeating Swindon Town of Football League Division 3. After a 2–2 draw at Swindon (Tooting's goalscorers were Nicky Glover and Derek Casey), Tooting won 2–1 at Sandy Lane with goals from Dave Juneman and Alan Ives. On 24 January 1976, the team and its supporters made the long journey to Bradford City of Football League Division 4. Although they did get on the scoresheet through Dave Juneman, they lost 3–1. After the game, Bradford City's Don Hutchins, who scored two of his side's goals, said he thought ‘the game was tougher than Rotherham and Shrewsbury’ (Bradford's Football League opponents in the previous two rounds). ‘Tooting put up a good fight.’

This proved to be the club's high point although the team went on to reach the second round proper in 1976–77 losing away at Kettering 1–0 and the first round proper in 1977–78 losing 2–1 at home to Northampton Town of Football League Division 4.

In 2000–01 Keith Boanas led the club to the Isthmian League Second Division title, before leaving to manage Charlton Athletic Ladies. In the Isthmian League First Division, the club were managed by Richard Cadette, whose lengthy list of former clubs included Falkirk, Millwall and Brentford.

The team played a very consistent first half of the 2005–06 season but injuries and the loss of star player Gavin Grant to Gillingham saw the team lose some of their cutting edge and start to falter. At the end of this season Cadette was sacked as the team once again failed to gain promotion following defeat in the playoff semi-finals to Tonbridge Angels. Former player Billy Smith was appointed as manager for the start of the 2006–07 season, in which the club won the Surrey Senior Cup and London Senior Cup. In May 2008, the club secured promotion to the Isthmian League Premier Division by defeating Cray Wanderers 1–0 at Imperial Fields.

In the 2009–10 season they reached the first round of the FA Cup where they played in front of over 3,000 people against Stockport County although they were beaten 5–0. Despite an encouraging season the board announced that the club required a 40% cut in budget, these changes saw manager Billy Smith, his assistant George Wakeling and many of the players leave the club. Former Sheffield United player Mark Beard was appointed manager in May 2010, with former player Kevin Cooper as his assistant. After a good start to the 2011–12 season Beard was relieved of his position in December 2011 when results declined. Academy manager Danny Lee was appointed caretaker manager but declined the job permanently. As a result, Kenny Brown was appointed the new manager. However the results got worse and Tooting were relegated at the end of the 2011–12 season.

Tooting & Mitcham had three managers in the 2012–13 season (Roberto Forzoni, Jamie Martin and Phil Simpson). The manager up until the end of the 2014–15 season was former player Craig Tanner who was in his second season at the helm with the Terrors before being sacked because of a lack of progress. Frank Wilson took his first senior role in football from 2015/16, an uncertain start saw a change in staff. Wilson introduced Paul Dale as 1st team coach in November 2015, a move that saw results improve, a climb away from relegation and the season rounded off with 2–0 victory in the London Senior Cup against Hendon. The following season saw them finish as Division One South Champions, finishing on 105 points, earning themselves a place in the Isthmian Premier Division. Having suffered immediate relegation in the 2017–18 season, they were relegated a further time to the ninth tier in the 2022–23 season.

== Stadium ==
Imperial Fields has a capacity of 3,500 (including 612 seats) and is located in Morden. There are two adjoining artificial 3G multi-purpose pitches, used primarily for training but also games of various sporting activities. The stadium was selected as a 2012 Olympics Torch bearer change-over point, the torch was carried in by BBC Sport commentator and presenter, Sue Barker.

The club moved to Imperial Fields in August 2002 from their previous historic ground at Sandy Lane in Mitcham, where they had played since their formation. The final competitive match at Sandy Lane was on 20th April 2002, an Isthmian League fixture against Wealdstone F.C. which saw a 3-2 victory for the home team. The site was later turned into a housing estate with the roads being named after former Tooting and Mitcham players.

The new stadium had previously been the site of a former Chelsea, Crystal Palace and Brentford training pitch and is adjacent to the River Wandle. The stadium was chosen to host the 2007 and 2011 finals of the London Senior Cup.

The club also has an academy scheme to develop talented 16 to 21-year-olds. This is run partly in association with Ernest Bevin College.

== Honours ==
- Surrey Senior Cup
  - Winners (9): 1937–38, 1943–44, 1944–5, 1952–53, 1959–60, 1975–76, 1976–77, 1977–78, 2006–07
  - Runners-Up: 1955–56, 1982–83, 1995–96, 2000–1, 2018–19
- London Senior Cup
  - Winners (8): 1942–43, 1948–49, 1958–59, 1959–60, 2006–07, 2007–08, 2015–16, 2020–21
- Isthmian League
  - Premier Division Champions (2): 1957–58, 1959–60
  - South East Division Champions (1): 2016–17
  - Second Division Champions (1): 2000–01
  - D1 South Play-off Winners (1): 2007–08
- Athenian League
  - Champions (2): 1949–1950, 1954–55
- Surrey Senior Shield
  - Winners: 1951–52, 1960–61, 1961–62, 1965–66
- London Challenge Cup
  - Finalists: 1959–60
- South Thames Cup
  - Winners: 1969–70

== Records ==
- FA Cup
  - 1st Round: 1948–49, 1950–51, 1963–64, 1974–75, 1977–78, 2009–10
  - 2nd Round: 1956–57, 1976–77
  - 3rd Round: 1958–59
  - 4th Round: 1975–76
- FA Trophy
  - Quarter Finals 1975–76
- F.A. Amateur Cup
  - 4th Round: 1952–53, 1955–56, 1956–57
- FA Vase
  - Quarter Finals: 2000–01
- Record attendance:
  - Sandy Lane: 17,500 vs Queens Park Rangers, FA Cup second round, 8 December 1956
  - Imperial Fields: 2,637 vs AFC Wimbledon, Isthmian League Division One, 16 April 2005
- Biggest victory: 11–0 vs Welton Rovers, FA Amateur Cup, 1962–63
- Heaviest defeat: 1–8 vs Kingstonian, Surrey Senior Cup, 1966–67
- Most appearances: Danny Godwin, 470
- Most goals: Alan Ives, 92
