= Belstone F.C. =

Association football club in England

Coordinates: 51°39′50.1″N 0°18′29.77″W

Belstone
- Full name: Belstone Football Club
- Founded: 1983; 43 years ago
- Ground: Medburn Ground, Radlett
- Chairman: Paul Lehane
- Manager: Aaron Lincoln
- League: Combined Counties League Division One
- 2025–26: Spartan South Midlands League Division One, 6th of 21 (transferred)
Home colours

Belstone Football Club is a football club based in Radlett, England. They are currently members of the Combined Counties League Division One and play at the Medburn Ground, Radlett.

== History ==
Belstone were founded in 1983, initially playing Sunday league football, before joining the Hertfordshire Senior County League Division One in 2009. Following promotion to the Hertfordshire Senior County League Premier Division in 2012, the club won the Premier Division in 2015, 2022 and 2024. In 2024, the club was admitted into the Combined Counties League Division One. Their name comes from a portmanteau of the Belmont Circle and Wealdstone areas of Harrow.

== Ground ==
Upon formation, Belstone played at the GEC London Sports Ground in Wembley. In 1989, following the sale of the GEC London Sports Ground, the club alternated between playing at Harrow College and Headstone Lane, Harrow. In 1992, Belstone moved to their current home at the Medburn Ground, Radlett.

== Records ==
- FA Vase
  - Third round 2026-27
