= Broadfields United F.C. =

Association football club in England

Coordinates: 51°34′11″N 0°21′55″W

Broadfields United
- Full name: Broadfields United Football Club
- Nickname: The Fighting Cocks
- Founded: 1993
- Ground: Tithe Farm Sports & Social Club, Rayners Lane
- Manager: Sunny Tailor
- League: Combined Counties League Premier Division North
- 2025–26: Combined Counties League Premier Division North, 4th of 20
- Website: https://www.broadfieldsunitedfc.co.uk/
Home colours

Broadfields United Football Club is a football club based in Harrow, Greater London, England. They are currently members of the Combined Counties League Premier Division North and play at Rayners Lane's Tithe Farm Sports & Social Club.

== History ==
The club was established in 1993, and joined the Southern Olympian League. They were Division Four champions in 1994–95, after which they joined Division One of the Middlesex County League. The following season it was renamed the Senior Division, and Broadfields were champions, earning promotion to the Premier Division. Despite finishing bottom of the Premier Division in 1998–99, they were not relegated. However, in 2003–04 the club finished bottom of the Premier Division again and subsequently left the league. They returned in 2007, joining Division One West. Despite finishing second-from-bottom of the division, they were promoted to the Premier Division for the 2008–09 season. They withdrew from the league towards the end of the 2009–10 season, resulting in their record being expunged, but returned to the Premier Division for the 2010–11 season.

In 2011–12 Broadfields won the Premier Division Cup, retaining it the following season. In 2014–15 they finished fourth in the Premier Division, allowing the club to be promoted to Division One of the Spartan South Midlands League. The club were Division One runners-up in 2018–19, earning promotion to the Premier Division. At the end of the Spartan South Midlands League they were transferred to the Premier Division North of the Combined Counties League. In 2022–23 they won the Middlesex Charity Cup for the first time, beating Northwood 1–0 in the final. They won the Middlesex Charity Cup again in 2024–25, beating Southall 1-0 in the final.

== Honours ==
- Spartan South Midlands League
  - Challenge Trophy winners 2017–18
- Middlesex County League
  - Senior Division Champions 1996–97
  - Alec Smith Premier Division Cup winners 2011–12, 2012–13
- Southern Olympian League
  - Division Four Champions 1994–95
- Middlesex Charity Cup
  - Winners 2022–23, 2024–25
- Middlesex Premier Cup
  - Winners 2016–17, 2017–18

== Records ==
- Best FA Cup performance: Second qualifying round, 2021–22
- Best FA Vase performance: Second round, 2016–17

== See also ==
- Broadfields United F.C. players
