= Windsor & Eton F.C. (2023) =

Association football club in England

Coordinates: 51°28′10″N 0°37′22″W

Windsor & Eton
- Full name: Windsor & Eton Football Club
- Nickname: The Royalists
- Founded: 2023; 3 years ago Original club: 1892; 134 years ago
- Ground: Stag Meadow, Windsor
- Capacity: 3,500 (450 seated)
- Chairman: Mark Cooper
- Manager: Rob Webb
- League: Isthmian League South Central Division
- 2025–26: Combined Counties League Premier Division North, 2nd of 20 (promoted via play-offs)
- Website: https://wefc.co.uk/
Home colours	Away colours

Windsor & Eton Football Club is an English association football club based in Windsor, Berkshire. They are currently members of the Isthmian League South Central Division and play at Stag Meadow, Windsor.

== History ==
The club was founded in 2023 by former Windsor FC manager Mark Cooper and Windsor Youth FC. Securing a 25 year lease of Stag Meadow in Windsor from the Crown Estate, they replaced Windsor FC, who were previously leasing the ground on a monthly basis. This forced Windsor FC to ground share at Holloways Park, home of Beaconsfield Town F.C. The FA granted the new club permission to use the same name as the original Windsor & Eton F.C. (1892) as it was deemed that enough time had passed since the former club's dissolution. The club was placed into the Premier Division of the Thames Valley Premier League for the start of the 2023–24 season, with Matt Angell being appointed the club’s inaugural first team manager.

For their first season, the club announced that admission for all home games would be free of charge, with the aim of attracting 1,000 people to their first home game against Burghfield on 19 August 2023. Volunteers distributed thousands of leaflets to households across Windsor promoting the first home game; this helped the club achieve its aim by getting a Thames Valley Premier League record attendance of 1,022 people to the match, which ended in a 0–0 draw.

In 2024, the club was admitted into the Combined Counties League Division One.

The following season in 2025, the club achieved another promotion by becoming Combined Counties League Division One Champions on the first attempt.

Despite never playing them, Windsor & Eton has a historic rivalry with Slough Town F.C. due to both the close proximity of the two clubs and Slough's former rivalry with Windsor & Eton F.C. (1892). The rivalry is known today as the Thames River Derby. The towns of Slough and Windsor are historically divided by social class.

== Colours and badge ==
Windsor & Eton FC's colours are red shirt and shorts, with green socks for the home kit. The away kit has a dark navy blue shirt with gold sleeves, dark navy blue shorts and gold socks.

The Windsor & Eton FC badge takes inspiration from the badge of the original Windsor & Eton FC by also depicting Windsor Castle and the River Thames in the same red, green and yellow colours as the original club badge.

== Ground ==
Windsor & Eton F.C. – Home ground

Windsor & Eton's home ground is Stag Meadow, St Leonards Road, Windsor, Berkshire, SL4 3DR.

The football ground was placed there in 1911 following an order from the Monarchy that an area of The Great Park should have an area for football. The ground was leased to the former Windsor & Eton FC until their demise on 2 February 2011 and then to the newly formed Windsor FC until the end of the 2022-23 season. Stag Meadow is a traditional non-League football ground with terraces all around the pitch and a small stand on one side. There is capacity for 4,500 inside the ground with 450 of these seated and 650 covered. There is also an officials' bar and a supporters' bar as well as a tea hut and club shop.

Shortly after formation, Windsor & Eton acquired a 25-year lease at Windsor's Stag Meadow ground, forcing Windsor to groundshare with Beaconsfield Town at Holloways Park.

The club plans to install an artificial playing surface so that youth and senior players alike can use the ground much more intensively.

== Honours ==
Windsor & Eton F.C. honours
Honour	No.	Years
Combined Counties League Division One Champions	1	2024-25
Combined Counties League Premier Division North Play-off Winners	1	2025-26
Combined Counties League Premier Challenge Cup Winners	1	2025-26

== Records ==
- Best FA Cup performance: Extra preliminary round, 2025–26
- Best FA Vase performance: Fourth round, 2025–26
- First competitive match: 2-2 v Reading City U23, Thames Valley Premier League Premier Division, 12 August 2023
- First competitive home match: 0-0 v Burghfield FC, Thames Valley Premier League Premier Division, 19 August 2023
- Record League win: 6-0 v Slough Heating Laurencians FC, Thames Valley Premier League Premier Division, 23 August 2023
- Highest home attendance: 1,331 v Broadfields United FC, Combined Counties League Premier Division North Play-off Final, 2 May 2026

== Youth teams ==
Windsor & Eton FC Youth started as New Windsor Youth in the early 1990’s, they later became known as Windsor FC Youth until the formation of the new Windsor & Eton FC which they helped form. They have over 550 players from ages U6 to U18, almost 50 teams and 120 coaches.
