= London Samurai Rovers F.C. =

Association football club in England

Coordinates: 51°25′59″N 0°23′48″W

London Samurai Rovers
- Full name: London Samurai Rovers Football Club
- Founded: 2017; 9 years ago
- Ground: Rectory Meadow, Hanworth
- Capacity: 1,000 (100 seated)
- Manager: Masakatsu Shibasaki
- League: Combined Counties League Division One
- 2024–25: Combined Counties League Division One, 18th of 23
Home colours	Away colours

London Samurai Rovers Football Club is a football club based in Hanworth, London, England. They are currently members of the Combined Counties League Division One and play at Rectory Meadow, groundsharing with Hanworth Villa.

== History ==
London Samurai United, a club formed for the Japanese diaspora in London, were formed in 2017, being placed in the Middlesex County League Division One. A year later, the club merged with JL Rovers, renaming themselves to London Samurai Rovers, stepping up to the Premier Division. In 2021, the club was admitted into the Combined Counties League Division One.

== Ground ==
The club played at Twyford Avenue Sports Ground in Acton during their time in the Middlesex County League. In July 2021, London Samurai Rovers announced they would be groundsharing with Hanworth Villa at Rectory Meadow for the 2021–22 season.

== Records ==
- Best FA Vase performance: Second round, 2025–26
- Best Combined Counties Premier Challenge Cup performance: First round, 2021/22, 2022/23 & 2023/24.
- Best Combined Counties Division One Challenge Cup performance: Semi-final, 2022/23 & 2024/25
