= Woodley United F.C. =

Association football club in England

Coordinates: 51.4657°N 1.01187°W

Woodley United
- Full name: Woodley United Football Club
- Nickname: United
- Founded: 2015
- Ground: Scours Lane, Reading
- Chairman: Colum Moon
- Manager: Vacant
- League: Combined Counties League Division One
- 2025–26: Combined Counties League Division One, 4th of 23
Home colours	Away colours

Woodley United Football Club is a football club based in Woodley, Berkshire, England. Formed in 2015 by a merger of Woodley Town and Woodley Hammers, the club are currently members of the Combined Counties League Division One and play at Scours Lane.

== History ==
=== Woodley Town ===
Woodley Town were formed in 1904 and joined the Wargrave & District League. In 1909–10 they won the league title and the League Cup. In 1923–24 the club won the Reading Junior Cup, beating Shinfield 1–0 in the final. After winning the title in the final season of the Wargrave & District League in 1926–27, the club joined Division Two of the Reading & District League. However, they finished bottom of the division in their first season in the league and were relegated to Division Three. They were Division Three champions in 1928–29, Division One champions in 1932–33 and Division Two champions in 1950–51.

In 1958–59 Woodley won the Premier Division of the Reading & District League, and retained the title the following season. They were Premier Division champions again in 1985–86. In 1989 the Reading & District League merged with the Reading Combination to form the Reading Senior League. During the 1990–91 season the first team withdrew from the league's Premier Division, with the reserve team in Division Four taking over as the first team. They were Division Four champions in 1991–92, earning promotion to Division Three. The following season saw them win the Reading Jubilee Cup and the Division Three title, resulting in promotion to Division Two.

In 1994 the club were renamed Woodley Town. In 1997–98 they were runners-up in Division Two and were promoted to Division One. The following season saw them win the Reading Junior Cup for a second time, beating Shinfield 2–1 in the final. The club won the Berks & Bucks Junior Cup in 1999–2000 and were Division One runners-up in 2000–01, earning promotion back to the Premier Division. They went on to finish as runners-up in the Premier Division in 2001–02 and were promoted to the Senior Division. Although they were relegated back to the Premier Division after only one season in the Senior Division, they were Premier Division runners-up again in 2003–04 and were promoted back to the Senior Division.

In 2008–09 Woodley won the league's Senior Cup and were Senior Division champions, resulting in promotion to Division One East of the Hellenic League. In 2011 the club announced plans to merge with Wokingham & Emmbrook, but the plans fell through.

=== Woodley Hammers ===
Woodley Hammers were formed as an under-12 team in 1973. The club later started an adult team and joined Division Four of the Reading Senior League in 2010. They went on to earn three successive promotions after finishing as runners-up in Division Four in 2010–11, runners-up in Division Three in 2011–12 and Division Two champions in 2012–13. They were then Division One runners-up in 2013–14. The league was renamed the Thames Valley Premier League in 2014, and the club were runners-up again in 2014–15.

=== Merged club ===
Woodley Town and Woodley Hammers had formed a women's team under the name Woodley United in 2011. In 2015 the two clubs merged their men's teams to form Woodley United, taking Town's place in Division One East of the Hellenic League. The club were Division One East runners-up in 2016–17, earning promotion to the Premier Division. However, they finished second-from-bottom of the Premier Division the following season and were relegated back to Division One East. In 2021 the club were transferred to Division One of the Combined Counties League.

== Ground ==
Woodley Town played their home games at East Park Farm, on Park Lane in Charvil. However, with the ground not up to Hellenic League standards, the club moved to Reading Town's Scours Lane ground in 2014. The merged club continued playing at Scours Lane.

== Honours ==
=== Woodley Town ===
- Reading Senior League
  - Senior Division champions 2008–09
  - Division Three champions 1992–93
  - Division Four champions 1991–92
  - Senior Cup winners 2008–09
- Reading & District League
  - Premier Division champions 1957–58, 1958–59, 1985–86
  - Division One champions 1932–33
  - Division Two champions 1950–51
  - Division Three champions 1928–29
- Wargrave & District League
  - Champions 1909–10, 1926–27
  - League Cup winners 1909–10
- Berks & Bucks Junior Cup
  - Winners 1999–2000
- Reading Junior Cup
  - Winners 1923–24, 1998–99
- Reading Jubilee Cup
  - Winners 1992–93

=== Woodley Hammers ===
- Reading Senior League
  - Division Two champions 2012–13

== Records ==
- Best FA Cup performance: Extra-preliminary round, 2017–18, 2018–19
- Best FA Vase performance: Second round, 2023–24
