= Berks County F.C. =

English football club

Coordinates: 51°26′25″N 0°46′32″W

Berks County FC
- Full name: Berks County Football Club
- Nickname: The Swords
- Founded: 2009; 17 years ago
- Ground: The Racecourse, Ascot
- Chairman: Jon Grimes
- Manager: Lee Simpson and Ellis Woods
- League: Combined Counties League Division One
- 2024–25: Combined Counties League Premier Division North, 19th of 20 (relegated)
- Website: berkscountyfc.com
Home colours	Away colours

Berks County Football Club is a football club based in Ascot, England but with teams playing across the County of Berkshire. They are currently members of the Combined Counties League Division One and groundshare with Ascot United F.C..

== History ==
Berks County FC were founded from two clubs established in 2009 by current President Richard Lloyd and current Secretary Steve Kay. In 2014, following a merger between Bracknell Rovers and Sunninghill Saints, a senior team was formed, being placed in the Thames Valley Premier League.

In 2021, the club was admitted into the Combined Counties League Division One, and during the 2023–24 season, they gained promotion to Step 5 of the National League System.

Berks County entered the FA Vase for the first time in 2021–22 and the FA Cup for the first time in 2024–25.

== Ground ==
The club groundshare with Ascot United FC at The Racecourse, Winkfield Row, Ascot SL5 7RJ.

== Records ==
- Best FA Cup performance: Extra preliminary round (2024–25)
- Best FA Vase performance: 3rd round (2021–22, 2025–26)
