= George Sykes (footballer) =

English footballer (born 1994)

Personal information
- Full name: George Robert James Sykes
- Date of birth: 14 September 1994 (age 32)
- Place of birth: Buckhurst Hill, England
- Position: Forward

Team information
- Current team: Takeley

Youth career
- Buckhurst Hill
- –2012: Barnet

Senior career*
Years	Team	Apps	(Gls)
2012–2015	Barnet	7	(0)
2013	→ Bishop's Stortford (loan)	12	(2)
2014	→ Farnborough (loan)	8	(1)
2014	→ St Albans City (loan)	7	(2)
2014–2015	→ Bishop's Stortford (loan)	14	(1)
2015	→ Canvey Island (loan)	19	(8)
2015–2016	Dartford	25	(1)
2015	→ Canvey Island (loan)	4	(1)
2016–2017	Canvey Island	45	(18)
2017	Braintree Town	0	(0)
2017–2018	Canvey Island	47	(25)
2018	Maldon & Tiptree	7	(2)
2018–2019	Tilbury	32	(11)
2019–2023	Aveley	100	(49)
2023	Bishop's Stortford	6	(0)
2023	Enfield Town	7	(1)
2023–2025	Brentwood Town	37	(8)
2025	Concord Rangers	7	(1)
2025–2026	Enfield	36	(5)
2026–	Takeley	4	(4)
- * Club domestic league appearances and goals as of 16:45, 31 August 2026 (UTC)

George Robert James Sykes (born 14 September 1994) is an English footballer who plays as a forward for Takeley.

== Club career ==
Sykes joined the Barnet youth team as an under-16 from hometown club Buckhurst Hill and was top scorer in the English U-18 youth system in the 2011–12 season with 24 goals. He made his senior debut at the age of 17 against Bristol Rovers on 21 August 2012. Sykes signed his first professional contract with the Bees in November 2012. He won the League Two Apprentice of the Year award at the Football League Awards in March 2013. On 15 August 2013, he joined Bishop's Stortford on loan.

On his return to Barnet in November, Sykes came on as substitute at home to Cambridge United. With the score at 2–2, Sykes put the ball in the net in injury time after it had dropped from a cloud of smoke caused by a smoke bomb, obscuring the view of the assistant referee, who controversially disallowed the goal, claiming the ball had gone out of play, and Sykes was denied his first goal for Barnet. His first goal for Barnet came on 30 November, when he scored an 89th minute acrobatic winner in an FA Trophy first round tie against Hayes & Yeading United.

Sykes joined Farnborough on loan on 31 January 2014, along with Jon Nurse. On 13 March, he joined St Albans City on loan until the end of the season, and was part of the team that won the Southern Football League Premier Division play-offs.

Sykes re-joined Bishop's Stortford on loan on 22 August 2014 until 1 January. Two weeks after his return from loan, he went out on loan for a fifth time, at Canvey Island.

Sykes joined Dartford on a free transfer in June 2015. After scoring only one goal in the National League South in the entire 2015–16 season, Sykes rejoined Canvey Island for 2016–17.

On 15 June 2017, after an impressive campaign with Canvey Island, Sykes joined National League South side Braintree Town.

On 20 July 2017, it was announced that Sykes had rejoined Canvey Island despite only recently signing for Braintree. Sykes joined Maldon & Tiptree in September 2018, before joining Tilbury in November. He then left in October 2019 to join Aveley.

Following Aveley's promotion through the Isthmian League Premier Division play-offs, Sykes departed to return to Bishop's Stortford, also newly promoted to the National League North.

== International career ==
In September 2012, Sykes was called up by Ricky Sbragia to the Scotland U-19 training camp ahead of qualifying games against Armenia, Romania and Switzerland in October 2012.

== Career statistics ==
As of 7 October 2023

Appearances and goals by club, season and competition
Club	Season	League			FA Cup		League Cup		Other		Total	
Club	Season	Division	Apps	Goals	Apps	Goals	Apps	Goals	Apps	Goals	Apps	Goals
Barnet	2012–13	League Two	3	0	0	0	0	0	0	0	3	0
Barnet	2013–14	Conference Premier	4	0	—		—		1 (Note: Appearance in FA Trophy)	1	5	1
Barnet	2014–15	Conference Premier	0	0	—		—		0	0	0	0
Barnet	Total		7	0	0	0	0	0	1	1	8	1
Bishop's Stortford (loan)	2013–14	Conference South	12	2	1	0	—		—		13	2
Farnborough (loan)	2013–14	Conference South	8	1	—		—		—		8	1
St Albans City (loan)	2013–14	Southern League Premier Division	7	2	—		—		2 (Note: Appearances in Southern League Premier Division play-offs)	0	9	2
Bishop's Stortford (loan)	2014–15	Conference South	14	1	2	0	—		1	0	17	1
Canvey Island (loan)	2014–15	Isthmian League Premier Division	19	8	—		—		—		19	8
Dartford	2015–16	National League South	25	1	1	0	—		0	0	26	1
Canvey Island (loan)	2015–16	Isthmian League Premier Division	4	1	—		—		—		4	1
Canvey Island	2016–17	Isthmian League Premier Division	45	18	3	1	—		3 (Note: One appearance and two goals in FA Trophy, two appearances in Isthmian League Cup)	2	51	21
Canvey Island	2017–18	Isthmian League Division One North	43	25	1	0	—		4 (Note: Two appearances and one goal in Essex Senior Cup, one appearance in Alan Turvey Trophy, one in FA Trophy)	1	48	26
Canvey Island	2018–19	Isthmian League Division One North	4	0	1	0	—		1 (Note: One appearance in Alan Turvey Trophy)	0	6	0
Canvey Island	Total		92	43	5	1	—		8	3	105	47
Maldon & Tiptree	2018–19	Isthmian League Division One North	7	2	—		—		2	0	9	2
Tilbury	2018–19	Isthmian League Division One North	25	10	—		—		0	0	25	10
Tilbury	2019–20	Isthmian League Division One North	7	1	2	1	—		1	0	10	2
Tilbury	Total		32	11	2	1	—		1	0	35	12
Aveley	2019–20	Isthmian League Division One North	17	12	—		—		11 (Note: Ten appearances and four goals in FA Trophy, one appearance in Essex Senior Cup)	4	28	16
Aveley	2020–21	Isthmian League North Division	6	2	4	3	—		2	2	12	7
Aveley	2021–22	Isthmian League North Division	37	20	3	0	—		3 (Note: One appearance in FA Trophy, one appearance in Alan Turvey Trophy and one appearance in Essex County Cup)	0	43	20
Aveley	2022–23	Isthmian League Premier Division	40	15	2	1	—		7 (Note: One appearance, one goal in FA Trophy, four appearances, one goal in Alan Turvey Trophy and two appearances in Isthmian League Premier Division play-offs)	3	49	19
Aveley	Total		100	49	9	4	0	0	23	9	132	62
Bishop's Stortford	2023–24	National League North	6	0	1	0	—		0	0	7	0
Enfield Town	2023–24	Isthmian League Premier Division	0	0	0	0	—		1	0	1	0
Career total			331	121	20	6	0	0	39	14	393	130
