= Hashtag United F.C. =

Association football club in England

Coordinates: 51°35′7″N 0°5′22″E

Hashtag United
- Full name: Hashtag United Football Club
- Nicknames: The Tags, Hashtag
- Founded: March 2016
- Ground: Oakside Stadium, Barkingside
- Chairman: Spencer Carmichael-Brown
- Head coach: Sammy Knott
- League: Isthmian League North Division
- 2025–26: Isthmian League Premier Division, 20th of 22 (relegated)
- Website: hashtagunited.co.uk
Home colours	Away colours

Hashtag United Football Club is a semi-professional football club based in Essex, England. They are currently members of the Isthmian League North Division and play at the Oakside Stadium in Barkingside.

== History ==
Hashtag United Football Club was formed in March 2016 by Spencer Carmichael-Brown, a football YouTuber better known as Spencer FC or Spencer Owen. Carmichael-Brown had begun making YouTube videos in 2007 as a student at the University of Reading, and the team initially consisted of friends from school and university.

From their foundation, the team primarily played five, seven, and eleven-a-side exhibition matches, which were filmed and uploaded to their YouTube channel. By September 2016, the team's Instagram account had over 100,000 followers, their Twitter account 41,000, and a 'penalty challenge' video uploaded to YouTube had accumulated over two million views. Hashtag United played various teams including a Comedians XI whom they beat 19–1, Google, the GB Deaf Team, Barawa, and a Manchester City staff team, with opponents fielding former professional footballers such as Paul Dickov, Graeme Le Saux and Ray Parlour, and celebrities including Omid Djalili. At one point in 2016, the club was rumoured to be interested in signing professional footballer Adebayo Akinfenwa. In 2017, the club won the EE Wembley Cup, a competition that Carmichael-Brown had created in 2015. The team included Scott Pollock, winner of the Hashtag Academy competition in 2017, who went on to sign professional terms with Northampton Town.

In early 2018 Chelsea captain and Spanish international César Azpilicueta invested in the club and became a co-owner.

Ahead of the 2018–19 season, the club joined the English football league system, initially being placed in Division One of the Spartan South Midlands League, before being moved to the Eastern Counties League after appealing that it was more suited to their Essex roots. After joining the pyramid, Carmichael-Brown stepped down as manager and was replaced by former East Thurrock United assistant manager Jay Devereux. Their first competitive match was a 3–2 away loss to Little Oakley on 4 August 2018. The club's first league season saw them reach the semi-finals of Division One Knock-Out Cup. They went on to win the Division One South title, earning promotion to the Essex Senior League. The 2019–20 season was abandoned due to the COVID-19 pandemic with the club second in the league, a point behind league leaders Saffron Walden Town and with three matches in hand. After the 2020–21 season was also curtailed due to the pandemic, at which point Hashtag United were top of the league, the club was promoted to the North Division of the Isthmian League based on the points per game accumulated over the two abandoned seasons. During their two seasons in the Essex Senior League, the club won 96 points from 38 games.

In 2022–23 Hashtag won 21 league matches in a row, going on to win the North Division title and earning promotion to the Premier Division. Towards the end of the 2025–26 season the club requested voluntary demotion, with Carmichael-Brown stating that it had become financially "unsustainable" for the club to maintain its seventh-tier status. The club subsequently finished third-from-bottom of the Premier Division, resulting in relegation to the North Division.

=== Season-by-season record ===
Season	League	Level	Position	FA Cup	FA Vase / FA Trophy	Notes
2018–19	Eastern Counties League Division One South	10	1/19	–	–	Promoted
2019–20	Essex Senior League	9	–	–	Second qualifying round	Season abandoned
2020–21	Essex Senior League	9	–	Second qualifying round	Second round	Season curtailed, promoted
2021–22	Isthmian League North Division	8	8/20	Preliminary round	First qualifying round	
2022–23	Isthmian League North Division	8	1/20	First qualifying round	First qualifying round	Promoted
2023–24	Isthmian League Premier Division	7	13/22	Second qualifying round	Third qualifying round	Finalists in the Isthmian League Cup
2024–25	Isthmian League Premier Division	7	8/22	Second qualifying round	Third round	
2025–26	Isthmian League Premier Division	7	20/22	First qualifying round	Third qualifying round	Relegated

== Other teams ==
The club currently operates a reserve and development men's side, as well as a number of development men's and women's youth teams. The youth section of the club was merged with Forest Glade for the start of the 2020–21 season.

In April 2020 the club announced that they would have a women's team, Hashtag United Women, from the start of the 2020–21 season as a result of a merger with AFC Basildon. The women's team plays in the FA Women's National League, the third tier, and won the Essex County Cup in 2022 defeating Billericay Town 2–1 in the final. The Women's team won promotion to Tier 3 after a successful 2022–23 campaign and on 23 March 2024 they clinched their 3rd trophy in as many years by winning the FA Women's National League Cup Final vs Newcastle United, winning 2–1 in front of a record crowd of 3,719 fans at Kenilworth Road, home of Luton Town FC. The women's team have since won the Essex County Cup on two more occasions in 2023–24 (beating Billericay Town 7–2) and 2024–25 (beating the same opponents 8–0).

The club also has one of the most successful eSports teams in the history of eFootball with many titles to their name. Their players have also won the ePremier League on two occasions.

== Colours and badge ==
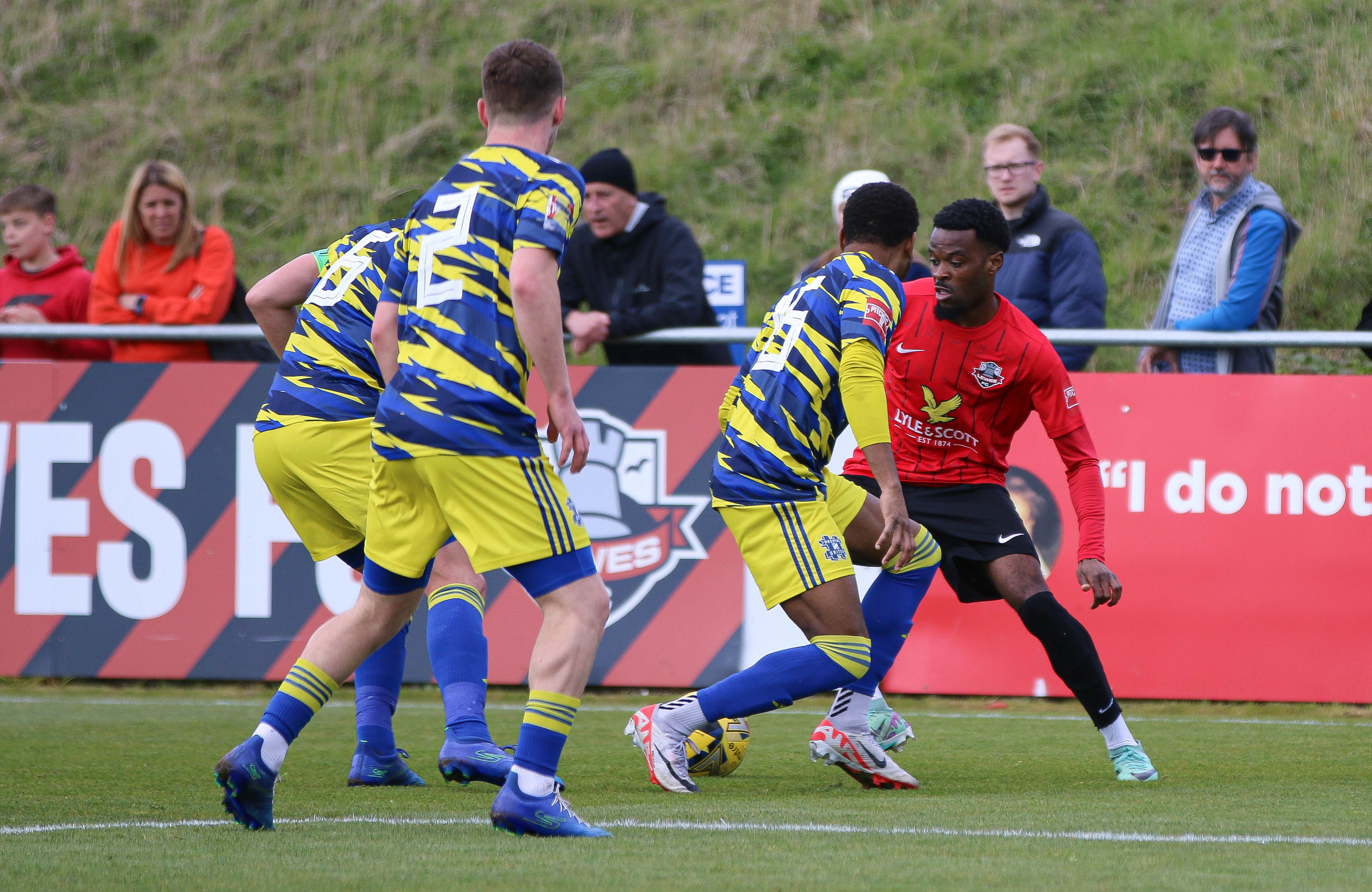
v. Lewes FC in 2024

Hashtag United's colours are yellow and blue. The club's first kit was a yellow shirt with blue sleeves, blue shorts and yellow socks. In January 2017, the club signed a kit deal with Umbro until the end of 2018. This saw the club's colours changed to blue, with yellow streaks down the side of the shorts. The first away kit was purple and black, a homage to the original Hashtag FC 5-a-side kit which pre-dated the club's official inception. The club also released a neon yellow and pink third/goalkeeper strip that was influenced by the Jorge Campos Umbro shirts of the 1990s.

The club's first shirt sponsor was EE. From 2017 to 2018, the shirt sponsor was online game Top Eleven. The online gambling company 188 Bet briefly sponsored the club’s shirt sleeves.

Ahead of the 2018-19 season, the club signed a new kit deal with Adidas, which saw the club's home shirt return to the traditional yellow and blue they had originally worn. The away kit for this season was blue and white, as Hashtag continued to change their away strip colours every season.

Ahead of the 2021-22 season, the club signed a new five-year kit deal with Hummel. This saw the kit's colours reversed again to be a blue shirt with yellow sleeves, blue shorts, and yellow socks. The away kit was predominantly white and black, featuring a blue lightning bolt design. The sponsor of the men's shirts was initially kept a mystery, with the shirts instead featuring a QR code that could be scanned to find clues about the upcoming sponsor. The sponsor was then revealed to be the upcoming free-to-play football simulator UFL. The women's team were sponsored by food chain TGI Fridays. For the following season, the away kit was a bold salmon pink design featuring a pattern inspired by noughts and crosses.

After the 2022-23 season, the club announced their kits would be manufactured by Adidas again, as a result of not receiving any kit sales revenue from Hummel's exclusive brand partner in the UK at the time, Elite Sports Group, which had entered into administration. During the 2023-24 season, Canna was announced as the new shirt sponsor for the women's team. For the 2023-24 season, the away kitwas claret, light blue and white, in a reference to the club that the founders grew up supporting, West Ham United, following their Europa Conference League win. For the 2025-26 season, Hashtag United introduced a red and blue away kit manufactured by VX3.

The club's badge is yellow and blue, with the club's name emblazoned on the horizontal lines of a hashtag symbol.

Kit history
Period	Kit manufacturer	Shirt Sponsor
2017	Umbro	EE
2017–2018	Umbro	Top Eleven Football Manager
2018–2021	Adidas	Football Manager
2021–2023	Hummel	UFL / TGI Fridays (Women's)
2023–2025	Adidas	UFL / TGI Fridays (Women's)
2023–2025	Adidas	UFL / Canna (Women's)
2025–2026	VX3	UFL / Football Manager (Women's)
2026–	VX3	LiveScore

== Stadium ==
After joining the Eastern Counties League, the club began playing at the Coles Park Stadium, groundsharing with Haringey Borough. In April 2019, following promotion to the Essex Senior League, Hashtag United announced that the club would move to Tilbury's Chadfields for the 2019-20 season. In March 2020 the club stated that they would move to the Len Salmon Stadium, home of Bowers & Pitsea, for the 2020-21 season. Since the merger, the women's team played at Canvey Island's Park Lane ground; but in April 2022, it was announced that the Women's team would move to Aveley's Parkside Ground from the 2022-23 season. In February 2024 it was announced that the men's team would be joining the women's at Parkside from the start of the 2024–25 season.

In January 2026 they announced they would have a long-term agreement with Redbridge to groundshare at the Oakside Stadium from summer 2026.

== Staff ==
Position	Name
Owner, Founder & Co-Chairman	Spencer Carmichael-Brown
Co-Chairman	Steve Carmichael-Brown
Co-Chairman	Derrick Pearson
Commercial Director & Co-Founder	Seb Carmichael-Brown
Chief Financial Officer & Co-Founder	Alexandra Osipczak
Head of Football	Jay Devereux
Men's First Team Head Coach	Sammy Knott
Men's Assistant Manager	Vacant
Men's Coach	Paul Prosser
Men's Goalkeeping Coach	Ben Sewell
Women's First Team Manager	Dom Edwards
Women's Assistant Manager	Alfie Crickmar
Women's Coach	Nick Crickmar
Women's Goalkeeper Coach	Andy Cade-Watts
Women's Reserve Team Manager	Vacant
Women's Ambassador	Siobhan Chamberlain
Physiotherapists	Sasha Edgeler and Jay L Pepper
Kitman	Rich Luff
Director of Youth Football	Clinton John

== Honours ==
=== Men's ===
- Isthmian League
  - North Division champions 2022–23
- Eastern Counties League
  - Division One South champions 2018–19
- EE Wembley Cup
  - Winners 2017
- Alan Turvey Trophy
  - Runners-up 2023–24

=== Women's ===
- South East Combination League / FAWNL South Division (level 3)
  - Runners-up 2023-24, 2024–25
- FA Women's National League
  - Division One South East champions 2022–23
  - League Cup winners 2023–24
- Essex Women's Cup
  - Winners 2021–22, 2023–24, 2024–25, 2025-26

=== Full international players ===
Hashtag United players who have represented their country while contracted to the club.

- Somalia - Sak Hassan (2023–2024)
- Saint Lucia - Kegan Caull (2025–)

== Records ==
- Best FA Cup performance: Second qualifying round, 2020–21, 2023–24, 2024–25
- Best FA Trophy performance: Third round, 2024–25, 2026–27
- Best FA Vase performance: Second round, 2020–21

== See also ==
- Hashtag United F.C. players
