= 2020–21 Essex Senior Football League =

Football League

The 2020–21 season was the 50th in the history of the Essex Senior Football League, a football competition in England.

The allocations for Steps 5 and 6 for season 2020–21 were announced by the FA on 21 July, and were subject to appeal. The league comprised 18 teams, a drop of one from the previous aborted season, with Tower Hamlets having been relocated to the Southern Counties East League. The 2020–21 season started in September and was suspended in December a result of the COVID-19 pandemic. The league season was subsequently abandoned.

== Promotions, relegation and restructure ==
The scheduled restructure of non-League took place at the end of the season, with new divisions added to the Combined Counties and the United Counties leagues at step 5 for 2021-22, along with a new division in the Northern Premier League at step 4. Promotions from step 5 to 4 were based on points per game across all matches over the two cancelled seasons (2019-20 and 2020-21), while teams were promoted into step 6 on the basis of a subjective application process.

== League table ==
Essex Senior Football League
- Season: 2020–21
- Promoted: Hashtag United
- Matches: 109
- Goals: 417 (3.83 per match)
- Top goalscorer: Craig Calver (11 goals)
- Biggest home win: Cockfosters 8–1 Clapton (15 September 2020); Walthamstow 7–0 Sawbridgeworth Town (17 October 2020)
- Biggest away win: Southend Manor 0–7 Takeley (27 October 2020)
- Highest scoring: Cockfosters 8–1 Clapton (15 September 2020); Takeley 7–2 Sawbridgeworth Town (29 September 2020)

Pos	Team	Pld	W	D	L	GF	GA	GD	Pts	Promotion or relegation
1	Hashtag United	12	10	1	1	29	10	+19	31	Promoted to the Isthmian League (Note: Promoted based on points per game calculations from 2019–20 and 2020–21 seasons combined.)
2	Stansted	15	9	2	4	27	19	+8	29	
3	Walthamstow	12	9	0	3	35	16	+19	27	
4	Cockfosters	11	8	2	1	29	9	+20	26	
5	Saffron Walden Town	15	6	5	4	34	16	+18	23	
6	Hadley	8	7	0	1	23	9	+14	21	Transferred to the Spartan South Midlands League
7	Hoddesdon Town	13	6	1	6	25	25	0	19	
8	West Essex	12	5	2	5	27	20	+7	17	
9	Takeley	11	5	1	5	34	19	+15	16	
10	Enfield	14	4	2	8	22	29	−7	14	
11	Redbridge	9	4	1	4	19	19	0	13	
12	Sporting Bengal United	13	4	1	8	16	27	−11	13	
13	St Margaretsbury	11	3	3	5	11	25	−14	12	
14	Sawbridgeworth Town	15	3	3	9	23	47	−24	12	
15	Ilford	11	2	4	5	20	27	−7	10	
16	Southend Manor	12	6	1	5	19	33	−14	10 (Note: Southend Manor were deducted 9 points.)	
17	Woodford Town	13	1	1	11	11	29	−18	4	
18	Clapton	11	0	4	7	13	38	−25	4	

Source: Essex Senior League
Rules for classification: 1) Points; 2) Goal difference; 3) Number of goals scored; 4) Number of matches won; 5) Head-to-head results

== Stadia and locations ==
Locations of the Essex Senior League clubs
Greater London Essex Senior League football clubs

Club	Location	Stadium	Capacity
Clapton	Plaistow	Terence McMillan Stadium (groundshare with Athletic Newham)	2,000
Cockfosters	Cockfosters	Chalk Lane	1,000
Enfield	Bishop's Stortford	Woodside Park (groundshare with Bishop's Stortford)	4,525 (525 seated)
Hadley	Arkley	Brickfield Lane	2,000 (150 seated)
Hashtag United	Pitsea	Len Salmon Stadium (groundshare with Bowers & Pitsea)	2,661 (300 seated)
Hoddesdon Town	Hoddesdon	Lowfield	3,000 (100 seated)
Ilford	Ilford	Cricklefield Stadium	3,500 (216 seated)
Redbridge	Barkingside	Oakside Stadium	3,000 (316 seated)
Saffron Walden Town	Saffron Walden	Catons Lane	2,000
Sawbridgeworth Town	Sawbridgeworth	Crofters End	2,500 (175 seated)
Sporting Bengal United	Mile End	Mile End Stadium	2,000 (439 seated)
Southend Manor	Southend-on-Sea	Southchurch Park	2,000 (500 seated)
St. Margaretsbury	Stanstead Abbotts	Recreation Ground	1,000 (60 seated)
Stansted	Stansted Mountfitchet	Hargrave Park	2,000 (200 seated)
Takeley	Takeley	Station Road	2,000
Walthamstow	Walthamstow	Wadham Lodge	3,500
West Essex	Dagenham	Mayesbrook Park (groundshare with Barking)	2,500 (200 seated)
Woodford Town	Harlow	The Harlow Arena (groundshare with Harlow Town)	3,500
