= Clapton F.C. =

Association football club in England

Coordinates: 51°31′11″N 0°2′12″E

Clapton Football Club
- Full name: Clapton Football Club
- Nickname: The Tons
- Founded: 1877
- 2023–24: Eastern Counties League Division One South, 18th of 22
- Website: claptonfc.com
Home colours	Away colours

Clapton Football Club is a football club in east London in England. One of the most successful clubs in non-League football during the first quarter of the twentieth century, they won the FA Amateur Cup five times between 1907 and 1925 and had several players selected by the England national team. In 2019 they were evicted from their long-time home, the Old Spotted Dog Ground in Forest Gate. After playing at other grounds for several seasons, they withdrew from the non-League pyramid at the end of the 2023–24 season.

== History ==
Established in 1877 under the name Downs Football Club and initially based at Hackney Downs in Lower Clapton, the club originally played in dark blue shirts and white shorts, with a distinctive white Maltese cross on the left breast. The following year the club adopted its current name. Clapton began competing in the FA Cup in 1888–89, and in 1890 became the first club from Great Britain to play in continental Europe, defeating a Belgian XI 7–0 in Antwerp.

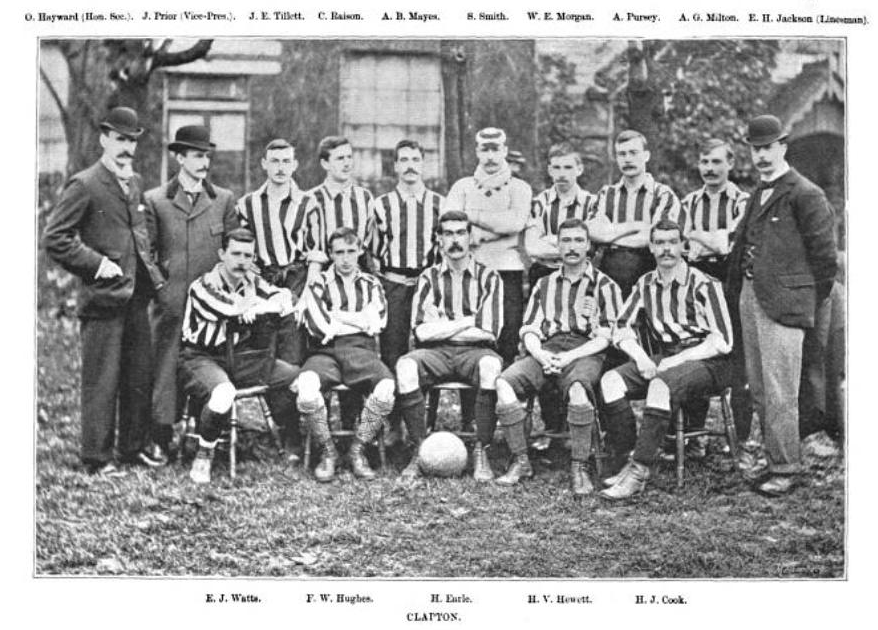
The Clapton squad in 1894

In 1894 Clapton became founder members of the Southern League, alongside Southampton, Luton Town, Millwall and Reading, and were placed in Division One. Finishing eighth in a nine-club league they were forced to play a test match to avoid relegation to Division Two, defeating Sheppey United 5–1. The following season saw them finish eighth again, but despite winning the test match against the 1st Scots Guards, the club resigned from the league as several of the other clubs turned professional.

The 1904–05 season saw Clapton reach the final of the FA Amateur Cup for the first time, losing 3–2 to West Hartlepool. The following season they became founder members of the Isthmian League, finishing as runners-up in its inaugural season. They won the FA Amateur Cup in 1906–07, defeating Stockton 2–1 in the final. In 1908–09, they won the Amateur Cup again with a 6–0 win against Eston United. The 1910–11 season saw them win their first Isthmian League title, and in 1914–15 the club won a third Amateur Cup with a 1–0 victory over Bishop Auckland in the final.

Clapton won another Isthmian League title in 1922–23. The following season saw them win their fourth Amateur Cup, defeating Erith & Belvedere 3–0 in the final. They went on to retain their title as Amateur Cup holders the following season, beating Southall FC 2–1 at the Old Den. In the same season, three Clapton players were selected for the England national team. In 1925–26 the club reached the third round of the FA Cup after wins against Norwich City and Ilford in the first and second round. They were eventually knocked out, losing 3–2 at 'home' to Swindon Town, a match that was played at West Ham United's Boleyn Ground and drew a crowd of 27,000. The club would go on to reach the first round of the FA Cup again in 1926–27, 1927–28 and 1957–58, losing to Brentford, Luton Town and Queens Park Rangers respectively.

In 1975–76 Clapton finished bottom of Division One of the Isthmian League, dropping down to Division Two, which was renamed Division One in 1977. At the end of the 1981–82 season they were relegated to Division Two, but bounced back at the first time of asking as champions. The club won the Essex Senior Cup for a third time in 1984, but were relegated again at the end of the 1984–85 season, dropping into Division Two North. In 1991 the club was placed in Division Three after league reorganisation, which later became Division Two due to further reorganisation. In 2005–06 Clapton finished in bottom of the league for the second consecutive season, and subsequently joined the Essex Senior League after Division Two was disbanded.

In 2015–16 Clapton won the Gordon Brasted Memorial Trophy, beating Stansted 4–0 in the final. In 2018 many supporters split away to form Clapton Community Football Club, accusing long-time club secretary Vince McBean of mismanagement and financial opacity. The following year Clapton lost the lease on the Old Spotted Dog, which was secured by Clapton CFC, who purchased the freehold outright in 2020. After finishing second-from-bottom of the Essex Senior League in 2022–23, Clapton were relegated to Division One South of the Eastern Counties League. They were due to be transferred to Division One of the Southern Counties East League for the 2024–25 season, but withdrew from the league on 18 June. The club remains in existence but has ceased playing matches.

== Ground ==
Clapton originally played on pitches at Hackney Downs, before moving to North Millfield in Lower Clapton in 1880. The club then briefly played at Elm Farm and Pilgrims Road and then relocated to the Old Spotted Dog Ground in Forest Gate in 1887 after it was vacated by St Bartholomew's Hospital. The first match at the new ground was played on 29 September 1888, a 1–1 draw with Old Carthusians in front of a crowd of 700.

During the 2001–02 Isthmian League season, Clapton spent the entire season playing away from the Old Spotted Dog due to the club's failure to undertake the Isthmian League's required ground improvements. Clapton played the majority of their home fixtures at Aveley's Mill Field ground, as well as groundsharing with Purfleet, Barking & East Ham United, Wembley and Hertford Town. Clapton eventually returned to the Old Spotted Dog in 2003.

In the opening weeks of the 2019–20 season, Clapton, and fellow tenants Hackney Wick, were forced to vacate the Old Spotted Dog due to non-payment of rent by the leaseholders, Newham Community Leisure Trust Limited, a charity in which Clapton FC 'Chief Executive' was a Trustee/Director. During Clapton's exile, they played at Redbridge's Oakside Stadium and Aveley's new Parkside ground. On 17 September 2019 it was confirmed that Clapton had not been awarded a lease to remain at the Old Spotted Dog, with breakaway club Clapton Community winning the lease bid. On 12 November 2019, it was announced Clapton would groundshare with Southend Manor at Southchurch Park for the remainder of the season. In July 2020 it was confirmed that Clapton would play at the Terence McMillan Stadium in Plaistow for the 2020–21 season.

== Supporters ==
During Clapton's peak in the late 19th century, the club averaged a regular home crowd of 4,000 spectators. During this period, the club were nicknamed the Doggies after their relocation to Forest Gate.

In 2012 a supporters group named the Clapton Ultras was started. The group followed the European ultras tradition and developed around local fans disengaged with modern professional football, migrants to east London and those with an opposition to discrimination and far-right politics. Following the creation of the Ultras, the club's home attendances rose from an average of 20 in 2011–12 to 335 by the 2015–16 season. Two clubs have refused to admit Clapton fans for their matches: Southend Manor and Metropolitan Police. In July 2017, supporters won a high court injunction against Clapton chief executive Vincent McBean, who had attempted to liquidate Newham Community Leisure Limited, the charity that held the lease on the Old Spotted Dog ground.

After Clapton discontinued their reserve and youth teams in 2016, Clapton supporters founded Downs Football Club with the club name, badge and kit all in homage to the original Downs Football Club of 1878. In 2018 some supporters formed a breakaway fan-owned club under the name of Clapton Community, joining the Middlesex County League for the 2018–19 season, playing at Wadham Lodge. After Clapton Community were promoted to the Eastern Counties League in 2023, the two clubs played each other for the first time in October 2023.

== Honours ==
- Isthmian League
  - Champions 1910–11, 1922–23
  - Division Two champions 1982–83
- Essex Senior League
  - Gordon Brasted Memorial Trophy winners 2016
- FA Amateur Cup
  - Winners 1906–07, 1908–09, 1914–15, 1923–24, 1924–25
- London Senior Cup
  - Winners 1888–89, 1908–09, 1910–11
- Essex Senior Cup
  - Winners 1890–91, 1924–25, 1925–26, 1954–55, 1983–84
- Middlesex Senior Cup
  - Winners 1888–89
- Essex Senior Trophy
  - Winners 1988–89
- Essex Thames Side Trophy
  - Winners 1982–83, 1983–84
- AFA Invitational Cup
  - Winners 1965–66, 1970–71 (shared)
- London Charity Cup
  - Winners 1898–99, 1899–1900, 1901–02, 1902–03, 1923–24
- West Ham Charity Cup
  - Winners 1889–90, 1903–04, 1906–07, 1907–08, 1922–23, 1924–25, 1925–26
- London Junior Cup
  - Winners 1887–88, 1892–93, 1907–08
- London County Amateur Cup
  - Winners 1908–09, 1909–10, 1910–11
- Liege Tournament
  - Joint Winners 1923–24
- Worthing Charity Cup
  - Winners 1926–27
- W J Collins Trophy
  - Winners 1968–69
- Visitors' Trophy
  - Joint Winners 1968–69
- Lee Rackett Memorial Trophy
  - Winners 1972–73, 1984–85
- John Ullman Trophy
  - Winners 1990–91
- Ilford Hospital Cup
  - Winners 1908–09

== Records ==
- Best FA Cup performance: Third round, 1925–26
- Best FA Trophy performance: Second qualifying round, 1980–81, 1983–84
- Best FA Vase performance: Second round, 1989–90, 1992–93, 2003–04
- Record attendance: 12,000 vs Tottenham Hotspur, FA Cup, 1898–99.

== See also ==
- Clapton F.C. players
- Clapton F.C. managers
- Football in London
