= 2022–23 Isthmian League =

The 2022–23 season was the 108th season of the Isthmian League, which is an English football competition featuring semi-professional and amateur clubs from London, East and South East England. The league operates four divisions, the Premier Division at Step 3 and three divisions, North, South Central and South East at Step 4 of the National League System. This was the fifth season since the former South Division was subdivided into the South Central and South East divisions. The league was also known as the Pitching In League under a sponsorship deal with Entain, formerly GVC Holdings.

The allocations for Step 4 this season were announced by The Football Association (FA) on 12 May 2022. Numerous changes were made to the constitutions of the level 8 divisions within the Isthmian League.

== Premier Division ==
Isthmian League Premier Division
- Season: 2022–23
- Champions: Bishop's Stortford
- Promoted: Bishop's Stortford; Aveley
- Relegated: Bowers & Pitsea; Herne Bay; Corinthian Casuals; Brightlingsea Regent
- Matches: 462
- Goals: 1,408 (3.05 per match)
- Top goalscorer: 32 goals – Sam Higgins (Hornchurch)
- Highest attendance: 1,677; Hastings United 2-1 Lewes (26 December 2022)
- Lowest attendance: 71; Bowers & Pitsea 2–2 Wingate & Finchley (13 September 2022)
- Total attendance: 220,668
- Average attendance: 478 (+3.9% from previous season)

The Premier Division comprised 17 clubs from the previous season, as well as five clubs who newly joined the Premier Division this season.

=== Team changes ===
To the Premier Division

Promoted from the North Division

- Aveley
- Canvey Island

Promoted from the South East Division

- Hastings United
- Herne Bay

Relegated from the National League South

- Billericay Town

From the Premier Division

Promoted to the National League South

- Cheshunt
- Worthing

Relegated to the North Division

- East Thurrock United

Relegated to the South Central Division

- Leatherhead
- Merstham

=== Premier Division table ===
Pos	Team	Pld	W	D	L	GF	GA	GD	Pts	Promotion, qualification or relegation
1	Bishop's Stortford (C, P)	42	27	7	8	75	33	+42	88	Promoted to the National League North
2	Hornchurch	42	25	9	8	98	49	+49	84	Qualified for the play-offs
3	Canvey Island	42	24	9	9	80	44	+36	81	Qualified for the play-offs
4	Aveley (O, P)	42	23	9	10	64	42	+22	78	Qualified for the play-offs
5	Cray Wanderers	42	20	14	8	78	48	+30	74	Qualified for the play-offs
6	Lewes	42	20	14	8	82	54	+28	74	
7	Horsham	42	20	12	10	84	57	+27	72	
8	Hastings United	42	20	11	11	63	42	+21	71	
9	Enfield Town	42	19	12	11	73	49	+24	69	
10	Billericay Town	42	19	8	15	66	59	+7	65	
11	Carshalton Athletic	42	18	10	14	53	53	0	64	
12	Folkestone Invicta	42	18	5	19	73	65	+8	59	
13	Potters Bar Town	42	16	5	21	56	86	−30	53	
14	Bognor Regis Town	42	15	7	20	70	72	−2	52	
15	Haringey Borough	42	13	12	17	67	75	−8	51	
16	Wingate & Finchley	42	12	12	18	53	64	−11	48	
17	Margate	42	11	11	20	48	65	−17	44	
18	Kingstonian	42	10	9	23	43	77	−34	39	
19	Bowers & Pitsea (R)	42	8	9	25	44	78	−34	33	Relegated to North Division
20	Herne Bay (R)	42	8	9	25	60	101	−41	33	Relegated to South East Division
21	Corinthian-Casuals (R)	42	7	5	30	37	87	−50	26	Relegated to South Central Division
22	Brightlingsea Regent (R)	42	5	9	28	41	108	−67	24	Relegated to North Division

Source: Isthmian League
Rules for classification: 1) points; 2) goal difference; 3) number of goals scored; 4) number of matches won; 5) head-to-head results
(C) Champions; (O) Play-off winners; (P) Promoted; (R) Relegated

=== Play-offs ===
Semifinals
2	Hornchurch	3 (4)
5	Cray Wanderers	3 (2)
3	Canvey Island	0 (2)
4	Aveley	0 (4)

Final
2	Hornchurch	0
4	Aveley	1

Semi-finals

26 April 2023	Hornchurch	3–3 (a.e.t.) (4–2 p)	Cray Wanderers	Hornchurch
19:45	Higgins 14', 93'; Nash 49'	Report	Ijaha 59'; Clunis 89'; Wood 108'	Stadium: Hornchurch Stadium; Attendance: 710; Referee: Nicholas Dunn
	Penalties
	Wraight (penalty scored); Clark (penalty scored); Mascoll (penalty scored); Hayles (penalty missed); Dickson (penalty scored)		Carter (penalty scored); Tanga (penalty missed); Golding (penalty scored); Sodje (penalty missed)

26 April 2023	Canvey Island	0–0 (a.e.t.) (2–4 p)	Aveley	Canvey Island
19:45		Report		Stadium: Park Lane; Attendance: 972
	Penalties
	Hubble (penalty scored); Sach (penalty missed); Paxman (penalty missed); Kouassi (penalty scored)		Odelusi (penalty scored); Gibbs (penalty scored); Sykes (penalty scored); Coker (penalty scored)

Final

1 May 2023	Hornchurch	0–1	Aveley	Hornchurch
15:00		Report	Scott 31'	Stadium: Hornchurch Stadium; Attendance: 2,040; Referee: Emily Heaslip

=== Results table ===
Home \ Away	AVE	BIL	BIS	BOG	B&P	BRI	CAN	CAR	COR	CRA	ENF	FOL	HAB	HAS	HER	HOR	HRM	KIN	LEW	MAR	POT	W&F
Aveley		1–0	0–1	1–6	2–0	1–1	0–1	0–0	2–1	0–1	1–1	2–1	3–0	2–1	1–1	1–0	0–1	0–0	2–0	3–1	3–1	1–0
Billericay Town	2–0		2–2	3–2	3–2	4–1	1–0	1–1	1–2	2–1	0–4	2–3	3–1	1–0	2–0	0–3	5–3	5–1	2–1	3–0	2–0	0–1
Bishop's Stortford	2–0	2–0		2–0	2–0	3–0	2–2	2–0	3–0	1–1	4–1	3–0	2–1	2–3	3–0	4–1	1–1	1–0	0–3	2–2	1–1	0–0
Bognor Regis Town	1–1	0–1	2–1		2–1	4–2	0–1	3–3	3–2	2–2	0–2	2–0	0–1	0–0	2–1	1–0	0–2	2–4	1–4	1–0	1–2	3–0
Bowers & Pitsea	2–1	0–0	0–1	0–4		1–1	1–1	0–1	1–0	1–2	1–4	3–1	2–1	0–2	2–1	0–2	0–0	2–2	2–3	0–2	2–0	2–2
Brightlingsea Regent	0–6	2–0	2–0	0–4	0–2		1–5	1–1	4–2	0–1	0–4	3–2	1–1	2–3	1–2	1–1	0–2	0–1	2–2	2–1	0–0	1–2
Canvey Island	2–2	1–2	2–0	3–2	0–2	3–0		1–1	2–1	1–1	3–0	3–0	1–1	3–1	3–2	2–1	1–3	3–0	1–3	5–2	5–0	0–3
Carshalton Athletic	1–0	2–0	0–2	2–1	1–0	2–1	0–2		1–0	1–1	1–3	1–0	0–1	2–1	1–3	2–2	1–1	1–0	2–1	1–0	5–2	3–1
Corinthian-Casuals	1–3	1–2	0–1	1–2	4–1	2–1	0–0	1–4		1–3	0–3	0–4	0–2	0–2	3–2	2–2	1–2	0–2	1–1	0–1	1–2	1–0
Cray Wanderers	2–1	4–3	2–3	2–2	3–3	4–0	1–0	2–1	1–0		1–1	0–0	5–1	0–1	3–0	0–2	5–3	2–0	2–2	1–0	5–0	0–1
Enfield Town	1–2	2–0	0–1	1–1	2–0	2–1	0–0	4–1	2–0	1–1		1–1	2–2	1–0	4–2	1–1	2–1	0–1	2–4	0–0	4–1	1–1
Folkestone Invicta	2–5	1–1	3–0	4–1	4–1	3–1	1–3	0–0	3–2	2–4	3–0		2–1	0–0	2–1	1–2	3–0	1–3	1–2	4–0	2–3	2–1
Haringey Borough	1–2	0–3	0–3	2–5	4–2	6–1	1–2	1–0	2–2	2–2	1–2	3–0		2–0	2–4	1–1	2–0	5–2	1–2	1–0	1–2	0–0
Hastings United	1–2	2–2	0–1	3–2	2–0	4–1	1–1	1–0	3–0	1–0	1–1	2–1	4–1		3–3	0–3	0–0	1–0	2–1	0–0	1–2	1–1
Herne Bay	1–2	2–2	0–5	2–1	3–1	1–1	1–4	2–3	3–1	3–5	1–3	1–2	0–1	0–3		0–6	3–0	1–1	4–1	1–1	1–3	1–1
Hornchurch	1–2	1–0	2–1	1–0	2–0	4–1	1–3	1–1	5–0	2–1	3–2	2–1	3–3	3–0	5–1		3–1	3–0	2–2	2–3	5–0	2–0
Horsham	2–2	3–1	0–2	4–0	4–1	6–1	2–0	1–3	5–0	2–2	3–1	1–3	3–3	0–0	4–1	3–2		1–0	2–0	4–0	3–2	2–0
Kingstonian	0–1	2–1	0–5	2–2	1–0	3–0	1–4	2–1	1–2	0–1	0–0	2–0	0–3	0–3	1–1	1–2	1–4		1–3	0–2	1–3	2–2
Lewes	1–1	1–1	2–1	3–1	2–2	2–0	0–2	2–0	2–0	0–0	1–0	3–2	4–0	0–0	3–3	2–2	1–1	3–0		2–0	2–1	5–0
Margate	0–1	0–0	0–1	2–0	1–1	3–3	2–0	0–1	2–0	0–3	2–5	0–1	3–3	1–2	4–0	1–3	1–1	1–1	2–2		2–3	3–1
Potters Bar Town	0–2	3–0	0–1	0–2	1–0	3–1	1–2	3–1	0–1	1–1	2–1	0–5	2–2	1–4	1–0	2–5	1–1	3–2	4–3	0–1		0–2
Wingate & Finchley	1–2	1–3	0–1	4–2	4–3	5–0	0–2	3–0	1–1	1–0	0–2	0–2	0–0	0–4	4–1	2–4	2–2	2–2	1–1	1–2	2–0	

Source: Football Web Pages
Legend: Blue = home team win; Yellow = draw; Red = away team win.

=== Stadiums and locations ===
Locations of the Premier Division clubs
Greater London Premier Division football clubs

Club	Location	Stadium	Capacity
Aveley	Aveley	Parkside	3,500
Billericay Town	Billericay	New Lodge	3,500
Bishop's Stortford	Bishop's Stortford	Woodside Park	4,525
Bognor Regis Town	Bognor Regis	Nyewood Lane	4,500
Bowers & Pitsea	Pitsea	Len Salmon Stadium	3,500
Brightlingsea Regent	Brightlingsea	North Road	2,000
Canvey Island	Canvey Island	Park Lane	4,500
Carshalton Athletic	Carshalton	War Memorial Sports Ground	5,000
Corinthian-Casuals	Tolworth	King George's Field	2,700
Cray Wanderers	St Mary Cray	Hayes Lane (groundshare with Bromley)	6,000
Enfield Town	Enfield	Queen Elizabeth II Stadium	2,500
Folkestone Invicta	Folkestone	Cheriton Road	4,000
Haringey Borough	Tottenham	Coles Park	2,500
Hastings United	Hastings	The Pilot Field	4,050
Herne Bay	Herne Bay	Winch's Field	4,000
Hornchurch	Hornchurch	Hornchurch Stadium	3,500
Horsham	Horsham	The Camping World Community Stadium	1,300
Kingstonian	Kingston upon Thames	Imperial Fields (groundshare with Tooting & Mitcham United)	2,700
Lewes	Lewes	The Dripping Pan	3,000
Margate	Margate	Hartsdown Park	3,000
Potters Bar Town	Potters Bar	Parkfield	2,000
Wingate & Finchley	Finchley	The Maurice Rebak Stadium	1,500

== North Division ==
Isthmian League North Division
- Season: 2022–23
- Champions: Hashtag United
- Promoted: Hashtag United; Sudbury
- Relegated: Coggeshall Town; Great Wakering Rovers; Tilbury; Hullbridge
- Matches: 363
- Goals: 1,086 (2.99 per match)
- Top goalscorer: 43 goals — Nnamdi Nwachuku (AFC Sudbury)
- Biggest home win: Grays Athletic 7–1 Witham Town (26 December 2022); Hashtag United 6–0 Great Wakering Rovers (15 April 2023)
- Biggest away win: Tilbury 1–8 Hashtag United (4 March 2023)
- Highest scoring: Lowestoft Town 5–4 Great Wakering Rovers (7 January 2023); Tilbury 1–8 Hashtag United (4 March 2023)
- Highest attendance: 1,111; Lowestoft Town 0-2 Hashtag United (11 February 2023)
- Lowest attendance: 43; New Salamis 1–3 Gorleston (7 January 2023)
- Total attendance: 102,144
- Average attendance: 269 (-0.4% from previous season)

The North Division comprised 20 teams, 15 of which competed in the previous season.

=== Team changes ===
To the North Division

Promoted from the Eastern Counties League

- Gorleston
- Wroxham

Promoted from the Spartan South Midlands League

- New Salamis

Relegated from the Premier Division

- East Thurrock United

Relegated from the Southern League

- Lowestoft Town

From the North Division

Transferred to the Northern Premier League

- Dereham Town

Promoted to the Premier Division

- Aveley
- Canvey Island

Relegated to the Essex Senior League

- Barking
- Romford

=== North Division table ===
Pos	Team	Pld	W	D	L	GF	GA	GD	Pts	Promotion, qualification or relegation
1	Hashtag United (C, P)	38	32	2	4	101	35	+66	98	Promoted to the Premier Division
2	AFC Sudbury (O, P)	38	29	4	5	91	33	+58	91	Qualified for the play-offs
3	Lowestoft Town	38	23	8	7	89	50	+39	77	Qualified for the play-offs
4	Heybridge Swifts	38	21	9	8	65	37	+28	72	Qualified for the play-offs
5	Grays Athletic	38	22	6	10	62	40	+22	72	Qualified for the play-offs
6	Felixstowe & Walton United	38	21	6	11	74	44	+30	69	
7	Stowmarket Town	38	20	6	12	63	44	+19	66	
8	Brentwood Town	38	15	10	13	57	50	+7	55	
9	New Salamis	38	14	13	11	63	65	−2	55	
10	Wroxham	38	13	11	14	52	55	−3	50	
11	Bury Town	38	13	11	14	37	41	−4	50	
12	East Thurrock United	38	14	7	17	46	55	−9	49	
13	Gorleston	38	13	5	20	49	71	−22	44	
14	Basildon United	38	9	13	16	44	63	−19	40	
15	Maldon & Tiptree	38	11	6	21	40	58	−18	39	
16	Witham Town	38	10	5	23	43	75	−32	35	
17	Coggeshall Town (R)	38	6	10	22	28	60	−32	28	Qualified for the inter-step play-offs
18	Great Wakering Rovers (R)	38	7	6	25	46	87	−41	27	Qualified for the inter-step play-offs
19	Tilbury (R)	38	7	6	25	36	77	−41	27	Relegated to the Essex Senior League
20	Hullbridge Sports (R)	38	6	4	28	35	81	−46	22	Relegated to the Essex Senior League

Source: Isthmian League
Rules for classification: 1) points; 2) goal difference; 3) number of goals scored; 4) number of matches won; 5) head-to-head results
(C) Champions; (O) Play-off winners; (P) Promoted; (R) Relegated

=== Results table ===
Home \ Away	SUD	BAS	BRE	BUR	COG	ETU	FEL	GOR	GRA	GWR	HAS	HEY	HUL	LOW	M&T	NEW	STO	TIL	WIT	WRO
AFC Sudbury		5–0	5–0	2–1	3–0	1–0	1–0	5–2	3–1	5–0	4–2	2–2	3–0	0–1	2–1	3–1	2–0	3–0	1–0	2–1
Basildon United	2–2		1–2	3–1	2–0	1–1	1–3	0–0	2–2	2–1	0–0	1–1	1–0	2–3	0–1	1–1	0–2	3–1	2–2	0–0
Brentwood Town	1–2	2–0		0–0	1–1	1–1	1–1	3–0	2–0	0–1	1–3	0–0	5–1	2–2	3–1	1–1	1–2	4–2	5–3	3–0
Bury Town	2–2	1–0	0–2		0–0	0–1	3–1	0–1	1–4	1–0	1–0	1–0	2–2	1–1	2–0	2–2	0–1	1–0	3–0	0–0
Coggeshall Town	0–1	2–1	0–1	1–2		2–4	1–3	4–0	0–0	1–0	1–2	0–0	1–3	1–3	0–0	2–0	0–5	1–1	0–1	0–2
East Thurrock United	2–4	0–1	1–0	1–0	1–2		2–2	2–0	1–2	2–0	0–4	0–1	1–1	1–0	0–4	2–2	1–2	1–2	1–0	0–2
Felixstowe & Walton United	1–2	2–0	2–0	1–2	1–1	1–1		3–2	1–0	2–1	4–0	0–1	2–0	0–1	3–1	5–0	3–1	2–1	4–1	2–1
Gorleston	1–2	3–1	0–1	0–2	2–0	1–0	0–0		1–2	2–2	0–3	3–1	3–0	1–6	1–0	2–3	0–2	2–5	4–1	1–2
Grays Athletic	0–2	3–3	3–0	1–0	1–0	1–0	3–2	3–0		2–1	2–3	1–1	2–0	2–1	2–0	0–0	0–0	2–0	7–1	2–0
Great Wakering Rovers	2–1	1–1	1–2	1–2	2–1	2–4	0–4	2–4	1–2		0–3	0–1	3–0	0–3	0–0	1–2	1–4	0–1	0–4	3–3
Hashtag United	3–2	3–0	5–2	3–1	2–1	2–1	1–0	2–0	3–0	6–0		2–0	4–0	3–1	2–1	3–1	1–1	3–1	4–1	2–1
Heybridge Swifts	3–2	5–1	3–1	3–0	2–0	2–0	2–1	1–0	0–1	2–0	1–2		4–1	4–4	0–1	3–0	1–3	5–1	2–1	0–1
Hullbridge Sports	0–2	1–2	0–3	1–2	1–0	1–2	1–2	2–3	2–0	1–0	0–3	1–3		0–0	1–2	1–2	1–0	0–3	1–3	2–3
Lowestoft Town	0–2	3–2	3–3	2–2	4–0	2–0	2–1	5–2	3–1	5–4	0–2	1–1	4–2		2–1	2–0	2–1	2–0	4–0	2–2
Maldon & Tiptree	0–3	3–1	0–2	0–0	1–1	3–2	1–2	0–0	0–2	0–3	0–2	1–2	1–0	5–3		2–5	2–3	0–2	0–1	1–1
New Salamis	1–1	2–2	1–0	1–1	3–0	1–2	4–3	1–3	2–3	4–1	1–2	2–2	3–2	2–1	2–1		3–1	1–1	1–0	3–3
Stowmarket Town	1–0	0–1	1–0	2–0	1–2	2–2	2–3	2–2	2–0	2–2	3–1	1–2	4–1	0–3	1–0	2–2		2–1	2–0	1–0
Tilbury	1–2	2–2	1–1	1–0	0–0	1–2	1–3	0–1	0–2	3–4	1–8	0–1	0–3	0–2	0–1	1–2	0–3		0–2	1–1
Witham Town	0–2	1–2	1–1	1–0	2–2	0–1	0–2	3–0	2–1	2–3	0–4	0–2	1–1	0–3	2–4	1–1	2–1	0–1		4–1
Wroxham	1–5	1–0	1–0	0–0	2–0	2–3	2–2	0–2	0–2	3–3	2–3	1–1	2–1	0–3	0–1	2–0	2–0	5–0	2–0	

Source: Isthmian League
Legend: Blue = home team win; Yellow = draw; Red = away team win.

=== Play-offs ===
Semifinals
2	AFC Sudbury	3
5	Grays Athletic	2
3	Lowestoft Town	0
4	Heybridge Swifts	2

Final
2	AFC Sudbury	1
4	Heybridge Swifts	0

Semi-finals

25 April 2023	AFC Sudbury	3–2	Grays Athletic	Sudbury
19:45	Lambe 34'; Nwachuku 56' (pen.); Harris 71'	Report	Bantick 14'; Clark 36'	Stadium: King's Marsh; Attendance: 670; Referee: Jack Willmore

25 April 2023	Lowestoft Town	0–2	Heybridge Swifts	Lowestoft
19:45		Report	Park 60'; Harvey 80'	Stadium: Crown Meadow; Attendance: 860; Referee: Chris Hastings

Final

29 April 2023	AFC Sudbury	1–0	Heybridge Swifts	Sudbury
15:00	Turner 98'	Report		Stadium: King's Marsh; Attendance: 1,257; Referee: Callum Fisk

Inter-step play-offs

29 April 2023	Coggeshall Town	1–2	Winterton Rangers	Coggeshall
15:00	Kithambo 90' (pen.)		Walker 79', 81'	Stadium: West Street; Attendance: 206

29 April 2023	Great Wakering Rovers	0–5	Quorn	Great Wakering
15:00		Report	Webb 9', 20' (pen.); Dube 29', 40'; Carlke 79'	Stadium: Burroughs Park; Attendance: 230; Referee: Christopher Hastings

=== Stadiums and locations ===
Locations of North Division clubs

Club	Location	Stadium	Capacity
AFC Sudbury	Sudbury	King's Marsh	2,500
Basildon United	Basildon	Gardiners Close	2,000
Brentwood Town	Brentwood	The Brentwood Centre Arena	1,800
Bury Town	Bury St Edmunds	Ram Meadow	3,500
Coggeshall Town	Coggeshall	West Street	2,000
East Thurrock United	Corringham	Rookery Hill	3,500
Felixstowe & Walton United	Felixstowe	Dellwood Avenue	2,000
Gorleston	Gorleston-on-Sea	Crown Meadow (groundshare with Lowestoft Town)	3,000
Grays Athletic	Grays	Parkside (groundshare with Aveley)	3,500
Great Wakering Rovers	Great Wakering	Burroughs Park	2,500
Hashtag United	Pitsea	Len Salmon Stadium	2,661
Heybridge Swifts	Heybridge	Scraley Road	3,000
Hullbridge Sports	Hullbridge	Lower Road	1,500
Lowestoft Town	Lowestoft	Crown Meadow	3,000
Maldon & Tiptree	Maldon	Wallace Binder Ground	2,000
New Salamis	Bowes Park	Coles Park (groundshare with Haringey Borough)	3,000
Stowmarket Town	Stowmarket	Greens Meadow	1,000
Tilbury	Tilbury	Chadfields	4,000
Witham Town	Witham	Spa Road	2,500
Wroxham	Wroxham	Trafford Park	2,500

== South Central Division ==
Isthmian League South Central Division
- Season: 2022–23
- Champions: Basingstoke Town
- Promoted: Basingstoke Town; Walton & Hersham
- Relegated: Bedfont Sports; Tooting & Mitcham United
- Matches: 380
- Goals: 1,119 (2.94 per match)
- Top goalscorer: 40 goals — Eddie Simon (Walton & Hersham)
- Highest attendance: 1,577; Basingstoke Town 3–1 South Park (22 April 2023)
- Lowest attendance: 47; Sutton Common Rovers 1–1 Southall (1 October 2022)
- Total attendance: 89,547
- Average attendance: 236 (+6.8% from previous season)

The South Central Division comprises 20 teams, up from 19 the previous season. Of the 20, 15 competed in 2021–22.

=== Team changes ===
To the South Central Division

Promoted from the Combined Counties League Premier Division North

- Hanworth Villa
- Southall

Promoted from the Combined Counties League Premier Division South

- Walton & Hersham

Relegated from the Premier Division

- Leatherhead
- Merstham

From the South Central Division

Promoted to the Southern League

- Bracknell Town
- Hanwell Town

Relegated to the Combined Counties League

- Chalfont St Peter
- Staines Town

=== South Central Division table ===
Pos	Team	Pld	W	D	L	GF	GA	GD	Pts	Promotion, qualification or relegation
1	Basingstoke Town (C, P)	38	29	2	7	89	37	+52	89	Promoted to the Southern League Premier South
2	Walton & Hersham (O, P)	38	28	3	7	102	41	+61	87	Qualified for the play-offs
3	Marlow	38	19	10	9	64	45	+19	67	Qualified for the play-offs
4	Hanworth Villa	38	19	9	10	58	50	+8	66	Qualified for the play-offs
5	Northwood	38	20	3	15	54	45	+9	63	Qualified for the play-offs
6	Binfield	38	16	9	13	63	51	+12	57	
7	Leatherhead	38	16	9	13	47	45	+2	57	
8	Chertsey Town	38	16	8	14	67	52	+15	56	
9	South Park	38	16	7	15	50	61	−11	55	
10	Southall	38	13	13	12	50	48	+2	52	
11	Chipstead	38	14	9	15	52	54	−2	51	
12	Westfield	38	12	13	13	54	50	+4	49	
13	Thatcham Town	38	12	12	14	56	57	−1	48	
14	Uxbridge	38	11	11	16	53	55	−2	44	
15	Guernsey	38	10	10	18	42	73	−31	40	
16	Ashford Town	38	11	5	22	46	91	−45	38	
17	Sutton Common Rovers (O)	38	10	7	21	45	71	−26	37	Qualified for the inter-step play-offs
18	Merstham (O)	38	7	15	16	43	66	−23	36	Qualified for the inter-step play-offs, then transferred to the Isthmian League South East
19	Bedfont Sports (R)	38	7	14	17	50	62	−12	35	Relegated to the Combined Counties League
20	Tooting & Mitcham United (R)	38	5	9	24	34	65	−31	24	Relegated to the Combined Counties League

Source: Isthmian League
Rules for classification: 1) points; 2) goal difference; 3) number of goals scored; 4) number of matches won; 5) head-to-head results
(C) Champions; (O) Play-off winners; (P) Promoted; (R) Relegated

=== Results table ===
Home \ Away	ASH	BAS	BED	BIN	CHE	CHI	GUE	HAN	LEA	MAR	MER	NOR	SPK	SHL	SCR	THA	TOO	UXB	W&H	WES
Ashford Town		0–3	1–0	0–1	2–2	1–4	4–2	2–2	0–3	0–3	3–2	2–1	3–1	1–3	2–1	3–3	2–1	4–3	0–5	0–5
Basingstoke Town	5–0		0–0	0–2	3–1	3–0	8–0	0–1	2–0	2–0	3–1	0–1	3–1	1–0	2–1	2–0	4–2	3–2	0–1	4–1
Bedfont Sports	2–2	1–3		1–2	0–0	0–0	6–0	0–0	0–1	2–2	4–2	0–1	0–2	1–4	3–3	0–0	0–0	2–1	3–2	0–0
Binfield	3–0	0–1	3–1		1–1	1–0	1–2	0–1	2–1	0–1	4–0	0–0	4–2	1–1	3–2	2–2	4–1	2–1	0–2	1–2
Chertsey Town	6–1	0–3	1–1	1–2		3–0	4–0	1–1	3–1	0–2	0–1	0–1	4–0	2–2	1–0	0–3	2–1	1–0	2–5	3–0
Chipstead	1–2	2–4	2–1	1–1	2–0		1–2	0–2	1–3	0–0	1–1	1–0	0–1	0–0	3–4	3–1	2–0	2–1	0–2	1–0
Guernsey	0–1	2–3	1–1	3–1	3–3	2–2		3–1	1–1	2–3	1–2	1–2	1–0	4–1	1–0	0–1	0–2	0–2	0–0	0–1
Hanworth Villa	1–1	0–4	2–1	2–2	0–4	2–5	3–0		0–0	1–2	2–1	2–1	2–1	2–0	3–1	3–2	3–1	2–2	0–2	2–2
Leatherhead	2–1	0–0	2–1	2–2	1–3	2–3	1–2	1–0		0–2	2–1	2–0	0–1	0–0	4–3	2–0	1–1	0–0	0–2	0–4
Marlow	4–2	5–2	3–2	2–2	0–1	3–0	1–1	2–0	1–3		1–1	3–0	1–3	1–1	1–2	1–1	2–0	1–1	4–3	3–0
Merstham	2–0	1–5	2–2	0–2	1–1	1–0	2–2	0–1	1–2	0–0		1–0	1–2	1–2	3–0	1–1	0–0	1–1	3–3	2–2
Northwood	3–1	0–1	1–2	0–0	3–1	0–0	2–1	1–4	3–1	3–1	3–2		0–2	2–0	2–1	2–0	3–2	1–0	1–2	2–1
South Park	1–0	0–1	4–3	3–1	0–3	0–2	2–2	1–2	1–0	2–0	1–1	3–1		1–0	1–0	2–4	1–1	2–1	2–0	1–1
Southall	2–0	0–1	1–0	2–1	4–1	1–4	3–0	2–0	1–0	1–0	3–3	1–2	2–2		2–2	2–2	1–1	1–2	3–2	1–1
Sutton Common Rovers	1–0	0–5	0–3	0–3	0–5	0–1	0–1	2–1	1–1	1–3	2–0	1–5	4–0	1–1		2–2	3–0	0–2	1–0	0–2
Thatcham Town	1–0	0–2	5–1	0–4	2–1	2–3	0–0	1–2	1–2	1–1	1–1	2–1	3–0	1–0	1–2		2–0	2–0	2–2	2–2
Tooting & Mitcham United	2–3	2–3	2–1	2–0	1–2	1–1	1–0	0–3	0–1	0–1	0–0	0–2	1–1	0–1	0–2	1–2		2–2	1–4	0–2
Uxbridge	6–1	1–2	2–3	4–3	2–0	1–0	1–1	1–1	0–2	0–1	3–0	1–0	2–2	2–1	0–0	2–0	0–4		1–3	1–1
Walton & Hersham	3–1	5–1	4–1	5–1	3–2	3–1	6–0	1–2	0–2	3–0	6–0	2–1	4–0	3–0	2–0	3–2	2–1	3–1		2–1
Westfield	1–0	4–0	1–1	2–1	0–2	3–3	0–1	0–2	1–1	2–3	0–1	1–3	3–1	0–0	2–2	2–1	2–2	1–1	1–2	

Source: Isthmian League
Legend: Blue = home team win; Yellow = draw; Red = away team win.

=== Play-offs ===
Semifinals
2	Walton & Hersham	2
5	Northwood	1
3	Marlow	1
4	Hanworth Villa	2

Final
2	Walton & Hersham	3
4	Hanworth Villa	1

Semi-finals

26 April 2023	Walton & Hersham	2–1	Northwood	Walton-on-Thames
19:45	Gough 28'; Mills 82' (pen.)	Report	Helmore 4'	Stadium: Elmbridge Sports Hub; Attendance: 1,047; Referee: Conall Bartlett

26 April 2023	Marlow	1–2	Hanworth Villa	Marlow
19:45	Bell 49'	Report	Merson 32' (pen.); Wells 90'	Stadium: Alfred Davis Memorial Ground; Attendance: 373; Referee: Thomas Breen

Final

30 April 2023	Walton & Hersham	3–1	Hanworth Villa	Walton-on-Thames
15:00	Kelly 48'; Hicks 59'; Gilbert 70'		Bender 14'	Stadium: Elmbridge Sports Hub; Attendance: 2,095; Referee: Ayrton Hursey

Inter-step play-offs

29 April 2023	Merstham	3–1	Egham Town	Merstham
15:00	Goode 43'; Adam 64', 82'	Report	Muhemba 17'	Stadium: Moatside; Attendance: 652; Referee: Will Briers

29 April 2023	Sutton Common Rovers	2–0	Crawley Down Gatwick	Tandridge, Surrey
15:00	Torpey 43'; Cox 87'	Report		Stadium: Church Road; Attendance: 164

=== Stadiums and locations ===
Locations of South Central Division clubs
Greater London South Central Division clubs

Club	Location	Stadium	Capacity
Ashford Town	Ashford, Surrey	Robert Parker Stadium	2,550
Basingstoke Town	Basingstoke	Winklebury Football Complex (Basingstoke)	2,000
Bedfont Sports	Bedfont	Bedfont Recreation Ground	3,000
Binfield	Binfield	Hill Farm Lane	1,000
Chertsey Town	Chertsey	Alwyns Lane	2,500
Chipstead	Chipstead	High Road	2,000
Guernsey	Saint Peter Port	Footes Lane	5,000
Hanworth Villa	Hanworth	Rectory Meadow	1,000
Leatherhead	Leatherhead	Fetcham Grove	3,400
Marlow	Marlow	Alfred Davis Memorial Ground	3,000
Merstham	Merstham	Moatside	2,500
Northwood	Northwood	Northwood Park	3,075
South Park	Reigate	King George's Field	2,000
Southall	Stanwell	Robert Parker Stadium (groundshare with Ashford Town)	2,550
Sutton Common Rovers	Tandridge, Surrey	Church Road (groundshare with AFC Whyteleafe)	2,000
Thatcham Town	Thatcham	Waterside Park	1,500
Tooting & Mitcham United	Mitcham	Imperial Fields	3,500
Uxbridge	West Drayton	Honeycroft	3,770
Walton & Hersham	Walton-on-Thames	Elmbridge Sports Hub	2,500
Westfield	Woking (Westfield)	Woking Park	1,000

== South East Division ==
Isthmian League South East Division
- Season: 2022–23
- Champions: Chatham Town
- Promoted: Chatham Town; Whitehawk
- Relegated: VCD Athletic; Haywards Heath Town; Corinthian; Faversham Town
- Matches: 380
- Goals: 1,084 (2.85 per match)
- Top goalscorer: 21 goals — Dan Perry (Burgess Hill Town), Louie Theophanous (Beckenham Town)
- Highest attendance: 2,540; Chatham Town 2–0 Ramsgate (10 April 2023)
- Lowest attendance: 60; VCD Athletic 0–0 Three Bridges (7 February 2023)
- Total attendance: 119,282
- Average attendance: 314 (-1.9% from previous season)

The South East Division comprises 20 teams, 16 of which competed in the previous season.

=== Team changes ===
To the South East Division

Promoted from the Combined Counties League

- Beckenham Town

Promoted from the Southern Counties East League

- Chatham Town
- Sheppey United

Promoted from the Southern Combination

- Littlehampton Town

From the South East Division

Promoted to the Premier Division

- Hastings United
- Herne Bay

Relegated to the Southern Counties East League

- Phoenix Sports
- Whitstable Town

=== South East Division table ===
Pos	Team	Pld	W	D	L	GF	GA	GD	Pts	Promotion, qualification or relegation
1	Chatham Town (C, P)	38	24	7	7	65	35	+30	79	Promoted to the Premier Division
2	Ramsgate	38	20	12	6	72	47	+25	72	Qualified for the play-offs
3	Whitehawk (O, P)	38	20	9	9	64	37	+27	69	Qualified for the play-offs
4	Beckenham Town	38	20	8	10	62	49	+13	68	Qualified for the play-offs
5	Hythe Town	38	20	7	11	51	34	+17	67	Qualified for the play-offs
6	Cray Valley Paper Mills	38	19	9	10	70	39	+31	66	
7	Sheppey United	38	19	8	11	71	54	+17	65	
8	Sevenoaks Town	38	17	7	14	60	51	+9	58	
9	Ashford United	38	16	9	13	57	47	+10	57	
10	Chichester City	38	14	12	12	55	49	+6	54	
11	Sittingbourne	38	13	12	13	50	42	+8	51	
12	Littlehampton Town	38	12	9	17	47	62	−15	45	
13	Lancing	38	12	7	19	47	60	−13	43	
14	East Grinstead Town	38	12	7	19	42	69	−27	43	
15	Three Bridges	38	11	9	18	54	64	−10	42	
16	Burgess Hill Town	38	10	9	19	49	62	−13	39	
17	VCD Athletic (R)	38	10	8	20	44	67	−23	38	Qualified for the inter-step play-offs
18	Haywards Heath Town (R)	38	8	12	18	50	81	−31	36	Qualified for the inter-step play-offs
19	Faversham Town (R)	38	8	7	23	43	74	−31	31	Relegated to the Southern Counties East League
20	Corinthian (R)	38	6	10	22	31	61	−30	28	Relegated to the Southern Counties East League

Source: Football Web Pages
Rules for classification: 1) points; 2) goal difference; 3) number of goals scored; 4) number of matches won; 5) head-to-head results
(C) Champions; (O) Play-off winners; (P) Promoted; (R) Relegated

=== Results table ===
Home \ Away	ASH	BEC	BUR	CHA	CHI	COR	CRA	EAS	FAV	HAY	HYT	LAN	LIT	RAM	SEV	SHE	SIT	THR	VCD	WHK
Ashford United		2–2	3–2	1–4	1–1	0–0	1–0	2–2	3–0	4–0	1–0	1–0	3–2	1–2	1–0	0–1	0–0	2–1	0–1	1–1
Beckenham Town	1–2		2–1	2–0	4–1	3–2	0–0	1–1	2–0	0–0	0–0	4–0	4–2	1–1	4–2	2–1	1–0	3–0	1–2	2–0
Burgess Hill Town	0–1	0–0		0–1	2–2	4–1	0–3	1–0	4–1	1–1	1–4	4–4	0–2	0–1	1–3	1–3	2–1	2–1	1–2	0–1
Chatham Town	1–0	3–0	2–1		2–1	1–0	2–1	1–0	2–0	0–0	6–1	2–1	1–0	2–0	2–1	0–0	1–1	2–2	3–0	2–1
Chichester City	1–0	2–1	1–0	2–4		1–1	0–2	2–0	1–1	4–0	1–0	1–0	3–0	2–2	1–0	0–2	1–1	2–1	2–0	4–1
Corinthian	0–4	0–1	0–1	0–1	2–1		1–2	1–1	0–2	0–3	0–2	0–2	1–1	2–3	0–0	1–1	3–0	0–2	3–2	0–2
Cray Valley Paper Mills	5–1	2–3	3–1	3–1	0–1	0–0		1–0	5–0	5–0	2–0	2–1	2–2	2–0	0–1	2–2	1–3	3–2	2–1	2–2
East Grinstead Town	2–2	0–2	0–4	1–0	3–2	1–0	0–3		1–0	2–1	3–2	2–0	0–1	1–3	3–0	0–1	1–3	1–1	2–2	3–2
Faversham Town	1–0	0–3	2–1	1–2	1–0	1–1	2–0	3–1		2–2	0–1	1–3	2–3	1–3	1–2	2–3	0–1	4–0	0–1	1–1
Haywards Heath Town	0–2	2–1	0–2	2–2	2–2	2–2	1–3	2–0	2–2		2–1	2–2	2–0	1–2	2–5	2–1	0–2	1–1	1–1	1–2
Hythe Town	1–1	3–0	1–0	1–0	1–0	2–1	1–1	4–0	1–0	4–0		3–1	0–0	0–1	0–0	1–0	1–0	1–1	0–0	1–0
Lancing	3–2	2–3	2–3	0–1	1–0	1–0	1–1	0–1	2–1	2–3	2–0		1–0	1–1	3–1	1–2	3–1	3–0	2–1	0–0
Littlehampton Town	1–3	4–1	1–1	1–4	1–1	5–1	1–0	1–1	0–2	3–2	1–4	1–1		2–0	0–1	2–3	1–1	1–0	1–0	0–1
Ramsgate	3–2	1–1	4–1	2–0	0–0	2–0	3–0	5–0	3–3	3–3	2–1	2–1	2–0		2–4	1–2	1–1	4–1	2–1	1–1
Sevenoaks Town	2–1	4–0	1–1	2–3	3–3	0–1	0–3	3–1	2–1	3–1	0–1	3–0	4–0	1–2		0–3	0–0	1–0	2–2	2–1
Sheppey United	2–1	5–1	2–4	2–2	1–1	1–0	1–3	4–1	2–2	2–4	1–0	2–0	7–3	3–3	0–1		0–1	3–2	1–0	1–1
Sittingbourne	1–3	2–3	4–0	0–0	2–1	3–0	0–0	2–0	2–1	5–0	2–3	1–1	0–1	0–0	1–1	1–4		1–1	3–1	0–2
Three Bridges	0–2	1–2	0–0	3–2	2–2	1–2	2–2	2–3	3–1	4–1	1–3	3–0	2–0	2–0	1–3	4–1	2–1		2–0	3–2
VCD Athletic	2–1	0–1	2–2	1–3	3–5	1–4	0–4	3–4	5–0	2–1	1–2	1–0	0–0	2–2	2–1	2–1	0–2	0–0		0–2
Whitehawk	2–2	1–0	0–0	1–0	2–0	1–1	2–0	2–0	6–1	2–1	2–0	4–0	1–3	1–3	3–1	2–0	2–1	3–0	4–0	

Source: Football Web Pages
Legend: Blue = home team win; Yellow = draw; Red = away team win.

=== Play-offs ===
Semifinals
2	Ramsgate	1 (3)
5	Hythe Town	1 (4)
3	Whitehawk	1
4	Beckenham Town	0

Final
5	Hythe Town	0
3	Whitehawk	1

Semi-finals

25 April 2023	Ramsgate	1–1 (a.e.t.) (3–4 p)	Hythe Town	Ramsgate
19:45	Osinfolarin 94'	Report	Collin 100' (pen.)	Stadium: Southwood Stadium; Attendance: 1,151

25 April 2023	Whitehawk	1–0	Beckenham Town	Whitehawk
19:45	Cooper 58'	Report		Stadium: The Enclosed Ground; Attendance: 702; Referee: Daniel D’Urso; Assistant referees: Thomas Price & Patrick O'Reilly; Fourth official: Joshua Langley-Fineing

Final

28 April 2023	Whitehawk	1–0	Hythe Town	Whitehawk
15:00	Harris 43'			Stadium: The Enclosed Ground; Attendance: 1,428; Referee: Morgan Conn

Inter-step play-offs

29 April 2023	Haywards Heath Town	2–3	Redbridge	Haywards Heath
15:00	Pingling 13'; Laing 33' (pen.)		Cobblah 49', 71'; Ogunwomoju 81'	Stadium: Hanbury Park; Attendance: 631; Referee: Ciaran Fidler; Assistant referees: Patrick O'Reilly & Daniel Jeffery; Fourth official: Jonathon Wilks

29 April 2023	VCD Athletic	0–1	Phoenix Sports	Crayford
15:00			Hayes 90+4' (pen.)	Stadium: Oakwood; Attendance: 820; Referee: Harrison Blair; Assistant referees: Connor Fanelli & Scott Crowhurst; Fourth official: Craig Barnett

=== Stadiums and locations ===
Locations of South East Division clubs

Club	Location	Stadium	Capacity
Ashford United	Ashford, Kent	The Homelands	3,200
Beckenham Town	Beckenham	Eden Park Avenue	4,000
Burgess Hill Town	Burgess Hill	Leylands Park	2,500
Chatham Town	Chatham, Kent	The Bauvil Stadium	5,000
Chichester City	Chichester	Oaklands Park	2,000
Corinthian	Hartley	Gay Dawn Farm	n/a
Cray Valley Paper Mills	Eltham	Badgers Sports Ground	1,000
East Grinstead Town	East Grinstead	East Court	1,500
Faversham Town	Faversham	Salters Lane	2,000
Haywards Heath Town	Haywards Heath	Hanbury Park	2,000
Hythe Town	Hythe	Reachfields Stadium	3,000
Lancing	Lancing	Culver Road	1,500
Littlehampton Town	Littlehampton	The Sportsfield	4,000
Ramsgate	Ramsgate	Southwood Stadium	2,500
Sevenoaks Town	Sevenoaks	Greatness Park	1,000
Sheppey United	Isle of Sheppey	Holm Park	1,900
Sittingbourne	Sittingbourne	Woodstock Park	3,000
Three Bridges	Crawley (Three Bridges)	Jubilee Field	1,500
VCD Athletic	Crayford	Oakwood	1,400
Whitehawk	Brighton (Whitehawk)	The Enclosed Ground	3,126

== League Cup ==
The 2022–23 Velocity Trophy (formerly the Isthmian League Cup) was the 49th season of the Alan Turvey Trophy, the cup competition of the whole Isthmian League.

Horsham were defending champions, having beaten Margate in the 2021–22 season.

=== Calendar ===
Round	Dates	Matches	Clubs
First round	27 September to 25 October	8	56 → 48
Second round	27 September to 31 October	16	48 → 32
Third round	24 October to 28 November	16	32 → 16
Fourth round	22 November to 21 December	8	16 → 8
Quarter-finals	10 January to 7 February	4	8 → 4
Semi-finals	21 February to 6 March	2	4 → 2
Final	5 April	1	2 → 1

=== First round ===
Sixteen clubs participated in the first round.

Tie	Home team (tier)	Score	Away team (tier)	Att.
1	Binfield (SC)	3–0	Marlow (SC)	87
2	Chichester City (SE)	2–1	Burgess Hill Town (SE)	164
3	Coggeshall Town (N)	1–2	Basildon United (N)	82
4	Felixtowe & Walton United (N)	3–1	Witham Town (N)	239
5	New Salamis (N)	2–3	Chertsey Town (SC)	45
6	Ramsgate (SE)	2–0	Hythe Town (SE)	205
7	Grays Athletic (N)	0–2	Tilbury (N)	148
8	Chatham Town (SE)	2–1	Sheppey United (SE)	588

=== Second round ===
The eight clubs who made it through the first round were joined in the draw by twenty-four clubs who received a bye to the second round, making thirty-two clubs.

Tie	Home team (tier)	Score	Away team (tier)	Att.
9	Whitehawk (SE)	4–0	Ashford United (SE)	143
10	Corinthian (SE)	0–1	Sittingbourne (SE)	91
11	Sevenoaks Town (SE)	2–1	Tooting & Mitcham United (SC)	132
12	Chertsey Town (SC)	0–2	Felixstowe & Walton United (N)	204
13	Maldon & Tiptree (N)	1–2	Hashtag United (N)	168
14	Westfield (SC)	1–2	Southall (SC)	70
15	Basingstoke Town (SC)	0–2	Binfield (SC)	205
16	Chichester City (SE)	1–0	Haywards Heath Town (SE)	127
17	East Grinstead Town (SE)	1–1	Leatherhead (SC)	119
Leatherhead advanced 6–5 on penalties
18	South Park (SC)	3–2	Ashford Town (Middx) (SC)	79
19	Three Bridges (SE)	2–2	Sutton Common Rovers (SC)	65
Sutton Common Rovers advanced 4–3 on penalties
20	Tilbury (N)	3–1	Great Wakering Rovers (N)	110
21	Walton & Hersham (SC)	1–0	Northwood (SC)	122
22	Ramsgate (SE)	1–2	Faversham Town (SE)	168
23	Basildon United (N)	1–3	Hullbridge Sports (N)	84
24	Merstham (SC)	0–3	Chatham Town (SE)	119

=== Third round ===
Sixteen of twenty-two Premier Division sides participated in this season’s competition. These teams received a bye to the third round, and joined the sixteen clubs that advanced past the second round.

Tie	Home team (tier)	Score	Away team (tier)	Att.
25	Aveley (P)	2-1	Tilbury (N)	141
26	Hashtag United (N)	1–1	Haringey Borough (P)	75
Haringey Borough advanced 3–1 on penalties
27	Brightlingsea Regent (P)	1-3	Bowers & Pitsea (P)	69
28	Folkestone Invicta (P)	5-0	Faversham Town (SE)	148
29	Horsham (P)	2-3	Whitehawk (SE)	333
30	Billericay Town (P)	1-3	Potters Bar Town (P)	197
31	Chichester City (SE)	0–1	Margate (P)	121
32	Felixstowe & Walton United (N)	1–2	Enfield Town (P)	209
33	Hastings United (P)	2-1	Corinthian-Casuals (P)	148
34	Hullbridge Sports (N)	3–2	Wingate & Finchley (P)	114
35	Carshalton Athletic (P)	4-2	South Park (SC)	123
36	Chatham Town (SE)	3–0	Sittingbourne (SE)	282
37	Herne Bay (P)	3-1	Sevenoaks Town (SE)	163
38	Leatherhead (SC)	2–1	Kingstonian (P)	148
39	Binfield (SC)	0–1	Sutton Common Rovers (SC)	92
40	Walton & Hersham (SC)	1–1	Southall (SC)	77
Walton & Hersham advanced 5–3 on penalties

=== Fourth round ===
Tie	Home team (tier)	Score	Away team (tier)	Att.
41	Haringey Borough (P)	2-2	Enfield Town (P)	147
Haringey Borough advanced 4–3 on penalties
42	Margate (P)	1-0	Folkestone Invicta (P)	213
43	Whitehawk (SE)	3–1	Hastings United (P)	142
44	Aveley (P)	2-0	Bowers & Pitsea (P)	69
45	Hullbridge Sports (N)	1–3	Potters Bar Town (P)	60
46	Carshalton Athletic (P)	4-1	Walton & Hersham (SC)	163
47	Chatham Town (SE)	2–0	Sevenoaks Town (SE)	342
48	Sutton Common Rovers (SC)	2–2	Leatherhead (SC)	84
Leatherhead advanced 4–3 on penalties

=== Quarter-finals ===
Tie	Home team (tier)	Score	Away team (tier)	Att.
49	Margate (P)	3-4	Whitehawk (SE)	202
50	Potters Bar Town (P)	3-1	Haringey Borough (P)	124
51	Chatham Town (SE)	5–0	Carshalton Athletic (P)	232
52	Aveley (P)	2-1	Leatherhead (SC)	105

=== Semi-finals ===
Tie	Home team (tier)	Score	Away team (tier)	Att.
53	Potters Bar Town (P)	2-1	Whitehawk (SE)	142
54	Aveley (P)	1-1	Chatham Town (SE)	178
Aveley advanced 4–2 on penalties

=== Final ===
5 April 2023	Aveley (P)	3–0	Potters Bar Town (P)	Parkside, Aveley
19:45 BST	Stephen 45'; Vaivada 49'; Coker 62'	Report		Attendance: 547

== See also ==
- Isthmian League
- 2022–23 Northern Premier League
- 2022–23 Southern League
