= 2019–20 Essex Senior Football League =

The 2019–20 season was the 49th in the history of Essex Senior Football League, a football competition in England.

The provisional club allocations for steps 5 and 6 were announced by the FA on 19 May 2019. The constitution was ratified by the league at its AGM.

Due to the coronavirus pandemic, and in line with directives from The FA, the Essex Senior League issued a statement on 16 March confirming the postponement of forthcoming matches. As a result of the COVID-19 pandemic, this season's competition was formally abandoned on 26 March 2020, with all results from the season being expunged, and no promotion or relegation taking place to, from, or within the competition. On 30 March 2020, sixty-six non-league clubs sent an open letter to the Football Association requesting that they reconsider their decision.

The league featured 16 clubs which competed in the division last season, along with three new clubs:

- Cockfosters, transferred from the Spartan South Midlands League
- Hadley, transferred from the Spartan South Midlands League
- Hashtag United, promoted from the Eastern Senior League

== League table ==
Essex Senior Football League
- Season: 2019–20
- Matches: 252
- Goals: 913 (3.62 per match)
- Top goalscorer: Dwade James (27 goals)
- Highest attendance: 395; Hoddesdon Town 2–6 Hashtag United (12 October 2019)
- Lowest attendance: 12; Sawbridgeworth Town 2–3 Sporting Bengal United (20 August 2019); 12; Southend Manor 1–0 Clapton (2 November 2019)
- Average attendance: 68

Pos	Team	Pld	W	D	L	GF	GA	GD	Pts	Promotion or qualification
1	Saffron Walden Town	29	20	6	3	69	28	+41	66	
2	Hashtag United	26	21	2	3	66	27	+39	65	
3	Walthamstow	26	20	3	3	73	17	+56	63	
4	Hadley	26	17	6	3	80	24	+56	57	
5	Stansted	27	16	2	9	55	36	+19	50	
6	Takeley	24	13	4	7	46	34	+12	43	
7	Hoddesdon Town	27	11	8	8	50	35	+15	41	
8	Redbridge	25	12	2	11	57	56	+1	38	
9	Woodford Town	28	10	4	14	43	48	−5	34	
10	Cockfosters	26	10	4	12	42	47	−5	34	
11	West Essex	24	9	4	11	51	51	0	31	
12	Clapton	27	9	4	14	40	59	−19	31	
13	Ilford	28	8	6	14	31	50	−19	30	
14	St Margaretsbury	28	6	8	14	36	48	−12	26	
15	Sporting Bengal United	26	8	4	14	44	62	−18	25 (Note: Sporting Bengal United penalised by three points on 6 Nov for contravention of league rules.)	
16	Enfield	26	6	6	14	36	66	−30	24	
17	Southend Manor	26	6	5	15	28	61	−33	23	
18	Tower Hamlets	27	6	4	17	36	65	−29	22	Transferred to the Southern Counties East League
19	Sawbridgeworth Town	28	2	2	24	30	99	−69	8	

Updated to match(es) played on 11 March 2020. Source: Essex Senior Leaguefchd
Rules for classification: 1) Points; 2) Goal difference; 3) Number of goals scored; 4) Number of matches won; 5) Head-to-head results
