= UFL (video game) =

2024 video game

- Developer: Strikerz Inc.
- Publishers: Strikerz Inc. XTEN Limited (mobile version)
- Engine: Unreal Engine 5
- Platforms: Xbox Series X|S, PlayStation 5, Windows, Android, iOS
- Release: PS5, Xbox X|S; 5 December 2024; Windows; 5 December 2025; Android, iOS; 22 May 2026
- Genre: Sports
- Modes: Single-player, multiplayer

UFL is a free-to-play football video game developed and published by Strikerz Inc. Initially scheduled for release in 2022 and 2023, the game was released to the public on consoles only on 5 December 2024, with the early access PC version started on 7 November 2025, and the full release PC version released on 5 December 2025. An early access mobile version released for Android started from 28 January to 9 February 2026, before full release mobile version will be released for Android and IOS in the same year.

== Development ==
The developers describe the game's primary model as "fair-to-play" with "a skill-first approach and zero pay-to-win options". Strikerz CEO Eugene Nashilov said the game's model is the company's "core principle", stating "players’ success should not depend on the number of in-game purchases or the value of donations they make". Development on the game began in 2016, and lasted for eight years. The game was built using Unreal Engine 5.

UFL was first revealed with a teaser trailer during Gamescom in 2021. In 2023, Cristiano Ronaldo was part of a group that invested £32 million into the game. On 7 June 2024, UFL released an open beta on Xbox Series X|S and PlayStation 5 consoles. This was available until 9 June.

== Licenses ==
UFL has partnered with FIFPro, a worldwide representative organization for over 65,000 professional footballers. Among the announced licensed clubs are West Ham United, Sporting CP, Shakhtar Donetsk, Borussia Mönchengladbach, Monaco, Beşiktaş, Celtic, Rangers, and Haverfordwest County. On 27 January 2022, Strikerz released a UFL gameplay trailer, which included ambassadors Cristiano Ronaldo, Oleksandr Zinchenko, Romelu Lukaku, Kevin De Bruyne, and Roberto Firmino.
