= 2021–22 Isthmian League =

The 2021–22 season was the 107th season of the Isthmian League, which is an English football competition featuring semi-professional and amateur clubs from London, East and South East England. The league operates four divisions, the Premier Division at Step 3 and three divisions, North, South Central and South East at Step 4 of the National League System. This was the fourth season since the former South Division was subdivided into the South Central and South East divisions. The league was also known as the Pitching In League under a sponsorship deal with Entain, formerly GVC Holdings.

The allocations for Step 4 this season were announced by The Football Association (FA) on 17 May 2021. Numerous changes were made to the constitutions of the level 8 divisions within the Isthmian League.

The scheduled restructuring of the non-League system took place for the 2021–22 season and a new division was added to the Northern Premier League at Step 4 for 2021–22, which resulted in some reallocations into or out of, and promotions to, the Isthmian League's Step 4 divisions.

== Premier Division ==
Isthmian League Premier Division
- Season: 2021–22
- Champions: Worthing
- Promoted: Worthing; Cheshunt
- Relegated: Leatherhead; East Thurrock United; Merstham
- Matches: 462
- Goals: 1,449 (3.14 per match)
- Top goalscorer: 35 goals – Oliver Pearce (Worthing)
- Biggest home win: Bishop's Stortford 7–0 Leatherhead (25 September 2021)
- Biggest away win: East Thurrock United 0–8 Enfield Town (23 October 2021)
- Highest scoring: Worthing 5–4 Lewes (23 October 2021)
- Highest attendance: 2,347; Lewes 1–2 Worthing (5 March 2022)
- Lowest attendance: 121; Wingate & Finchley 1–3 Cheshunt (23 November 2021)
- Total attendance: 212,646
- Average attendance: 460 (+18.5% to previous full season)

The Premier Division comprised the same set of 22 teams which competed in the aborted competition the previous season.

=== League table ===
Pos	Team	Pld	W	D	L	GF	GA	GD	Pts	Promotion, qualification or relegation
1	Worthing	42	31	4	7	100	45	+55	97	Promoted to the National League South
2	Bishop's Stortford	42	25	12	5	89	33	+56	87	Qualified for the play-offs (Note: Four teams played for one spot and promotion to the National League South.)
3	Enfield Town	42	26	6	10	91	57	+34	84	Qualified for the play-offs
4	Hornchurch	42	25	6	11	89	42	+47	81	Qualified for the play-offs
5	Cheshunt	42	22	10	10	71	40	+31	76	Qualified for the play-offs
6	Folkestone Invicta	42	20	12	10	85	62	+23	72	
7	Lewes	42	20	10	12	89	63	+26	70	
8	Margate	42	19	8	15	60	62	−2	65	
9	Bognor Regis Town	42	15	14	13	62	58	+4	59	
10	Kingstonian	42	17	8	17	68	71	−3	59	
11	Horsham	42	16	9	17	66	58	+8	57	
12	Carshalton Athletic	42	15	12	15	65	57	+8	57	
13	Potters Bar Town	42	16	5	21	54	74	−20	53	
14	Corinthian-Casuals	42	13	13	16	51	58	−7	52	
15	Wingate & Finchley	42	13	10	19	60	74	−14	49	
16	Bowers & Pitsea	42	12	9	21	54	72	−18	45	
17	Haringey Borough	42	9	15	18	57	81	−24	42	
18	Brightlingsea Regent	42	11	6	25	44	92	−48	39	
19	Cray Wanderers	42	10	9	23	64	85	−21	36 (Note: Cray Wanderers were deducted three points for fielding an ineligible player.)	Reprieved from relegation (Note: Seven clubs at Step 3, all four fourth-from-bottom teams and three that were placed third-from-bottom and had the most points per game (PPG), were reprieved.)
20	Leatherhead	42	9	9	24	43	83	−40	36	Relegated to South Central Division
21	East Thurrock United	42	9	8	25	44	98	−54	35	Relegated to North Division
22	Merstham	42	10	3	29	43	84	−41	33	Relegated to South Central Division

Source: Isthmian League
Rules for classification: 1) points; 2) goal difference; 3) number of goals scored; 4) number of matches won; 5) head-to-head results

==== Top scorers ====
Player	Club	Goals
Oliver Pearce	Worthing	35
Muhammadu Faal	Enfield Town	33
Joseph Taylor	Lewes	32
David Smith	Folkestone Invicta	29
Jake Cass	Bishop's Stortford; Enfield Town	19
Frankie Merrifield	Bishop's Stortford	19
Liam Nash	Hornchurch	19
Ben Greenhalgh	Margate	18
Thomas Wraight	Hornchurch	18

=== Play-offs ===
Semi-finals
3	Enfield Town	2
4	Hornchurch	3
2	Bishop's Stortford	2
5	Cheshunt	3

Final
4	Hornchurch	1
5	Cheshunt	2

==== Semi-finals ====
27 April 2022	Bishop's Stortford	2–3	Cheshunt	Bishop's Stortford
19:45 BST	Foxley 19'; Cracknell 58'		Liburd 30' (pen.); Re 60'; McKenzie 90'	Stadium: Woodside Park; Attendance: 1,504

27 April 2022	Enfield Town	2–3	Hornchurch	Enfield
19:45 BST	Guebi 39'; Faal 56'		Nash 54', 90'; Higgins 87'	Stadium: Queen Elizabeth II Stadium; Attendance: 1,948

==== Final ====
2 May 2022	Hornchurch	1–2	Cheshunt	Upminster
15:00 BST	Christou 36'		Kassaraté 19'; Newton 66'	Stadium: Hornchurch Stadium; Attendance: 2,035

=== Results table ===
Home \ Away	BIS	BOG	B&P	BRI	CAR	CHE	COR	CRA	ETU	ENF	FOL	HAR	HOR	HRM	KIN	LEA	LEW	MAR	MER	POT	W&F	WOR
Bishop's Stortford		3–1	2–2	5–0	1–1	3–1	3–3	3–1	4–1	2–1	3–0	1–1	1–0	0–0	2–5	7–0	1–1	1–0	6–0	3–0	3–1	3–0
Bognor Regis Town	0–0		0–2	2–1	1–0	0–2	3–2	2–3	1–1	2–2	2–4	1–2	1–2	2–2	1–1	3–2	1–0	4–1	2–1	2–0	2–2	1–3
Bowers & Pitsea	1–3	0–0		3–1	0–1	0–3	1–2	1–1	1–2	1–4	2–3	2–1	2–1	1–0	0–1	2–3	1–3	2–4	0–1	0–1	3–1	0–2
Brightlingsea Regent	1–4	0–5	2–3		0–0	1–2	0–1	1–0	2–1	2–1	2–2	3–0	1–5	0–6	2–4	1–0	0–4	1–2	2–0	2–0	1–3	0–3
Carshalton Athletic	2–0	0–1	0–0	6–1		2–1	1–2	1–3	4–1	2–4	5–0	3–0	0–1	0–1	1–0	3–3	1–2	0–0	3–1	2–3	2–0	2–1
Cheshunt	1–0	0–1	0–1	3–1	1–3		5–1	4–0	3–0	2–1	0–0	1–1	1–2	1–2	1–0	1–0	2–2	1–1	0–1	1–1	3–0	1–2
Corinthian-Casuals	0–2	0–0	0–3	0–0	2–1	1–1		4–0	1–2	1–2	0–1	0–0	1–0	0–3	0–1	1–2	0–0	3–1	0–3	4–1	1–1	1–1
Cray Wanderers	0–1	0–1	3–4	0–2	5–4	1–1	1–2		4–1	4–4	2–2	1–2	0–5	3–1	1–2	0–0	3–1	2–3	3–0	0–1	3–5	1–2
East Thurrock United	1–2	2–2	0–2	1–1	1–0	0–2	1–1	1–3		0–8	1–1	1–3	4–3	2–3	2–1	0–2	2–0	0–0	2–0	1–0	2–2	0–1
Enfield Town	0–2	1–0	3–1	2–0	2–1	1–0	2–1	3–3	3–0		2–3	1–0	2–1	1–0	2–0	1–0	1–4	4–0	3–1	4–0	2–1	2–2
Folkestone Invicta	0–0	1–0	2–2	5–1	1–1	0–4	2–2	1–0	3–1	0–0		5–0	0–0	2–1	5–1	3–0	1–2	0–1	6–1	3–3	1–0	3–1
Haringey Borough	0–6	3–3	0–0	3–0	1–1	2–4	0–1	1–1	5–1	0–0	4–4		3–3	3–1	2–3	2–3	2–2	2–2	1–0	2–2	4–1	2–2
Hornchurch	2–0	3–3	1–0	3–0	1–1	0–1	2–0	1–2	6–0	1–2	4–1	3–0		2–0	2–1	1–1	3–1	2–1	1–0	4–0	1–2–	1–3
Horsham	1–1	1–1	1–1	2–3	2–2	0–2	1–1	2–2	3–1	3–4	3–2	3–0	0–2		4–0	0–1	1–3	2–1	3–0	1–3	2–0	3–1
Kingstonian	0–2	1–0	3–3	3–1	1–1	1–1	1–1	2–1	0–1	3–5	1–2	1–0	2–0	1–0		2–2	4–2	3–1	4–1	1–2	2–0	3–4
Leatherhead	0–0	2–2	0–2	0–2	0–3	1–2	0–2	2–1	3–1	0–3	0–1	0–0	0–2	1–3	2–3		0–1	0–0	2–3	2–0	1–2	0–4
Lewes	0–2	2–0	2–2	2–2	1–0	2–2	1–2	2–0	3–2	4–1	3–0	4–2	1–3	0–0	3–3	5–0		2–0	3–0	1–5	2–3	1–2
Margate	0–0	1–2	3–2	2–1	0–0	2–2	3–1	2–1	2–0	2–1	3–1	3–1	0–3	1–0	2–1	4–2	2–6		2–0	0–1	0–1	4–2
Merstham	2–2	1–3	4–0	0–1	1–2	0–1	0–3	2–0	2–2	1–3	0–2	5–0	1–3	1–3	0–0	2–1	1–3	1–3		1–0	3–1	0–2
Potters Bar Town	0–3	2–2	2–0	2–1	1–2	1–3	3–1	2–3	3–0	0–2	0–7	1–0	1–2	0–1	2–1	3–4	1–3	2–0	2–0		0–0	0–3
Wingate & Finchley	0–2	2–0	2–0	1–1	1–1	1–3	2–2	2–2	5–0	4–1	1–4	1–2	1–2	3–0	3–1	1–1	1–1	0–1	2–1	0–2		1–3
Worthing	3–1	0–2	4–1	1–0	5–0	1–2	1–0	2–0	3–2	3–0	3–1	1–0	1–1	3–1	4–0	4–0	5–4	2–0	2–1	2–1	6–0	

Source: Football Web Pages
Legend: Blue = home team win; Yellow = draw; Red = away team win.

=== Stadiums and locations ===
Locations of the Premier Division clubs
Greater London Premier Division football clubs

Club	Location	Stadium	Capacity
Bishop's Stortford	Bishop's Stortford	Woodside Park	4,525
Bognor Regis Town	Bognor Regis	Nyewood Lane	4,500
Bowers & Pitsea	Pitsea	Len Salmon Stadium	2,000
Brightlingsea Regent	Brightlingsea	North Road	2,000
Carshalton Athletic	Carshalton	War Memorial Sports Ground	5,000
Cheshunt	Cheshunt	Theobalds Lane	3,000
Corinthian-Casuals	Tolworth	King George's Field	2,700
Cray Wanderers	St Mary Cray	Hayes Lane (groundshare with Bromley)	6,000
East Thurrock United	Corringham	Rookery Hill	4,000
Enfield Town	Enfield	Queen Elizabeth II Stadium	2,500
Folkestone Invicta	Folkestone	Cheriton Road	4,000
Haringey Borough	Tottenham	Coles Park	2,500
Hornchurch	Hornchurch	Hornchurch Stadium	3,500
Horsham	Horsham	The Camping World Community Stadium	1,300
Kingstonian	Kingston upon Thames	King George's Field (groundshare with Corinthian-Casuals)	2,700
Leatherhead	Leatherhead	Fetcham Grove	3,400
Lewes	Lewes	The Dripping Pan	3,000
Margate	Margate	Hartsdown Park	3,000
Merstham	Merstham	Moatside	2,000
Potters Bar Town	Potters Bar	Parkfield	2,000
Wingate & Finchley	Finchley	The Maurice Rebak Stadium	1,500
Worthing	Worthing	Woodside Road	4,000

== North Division ==
Isthmian League North Division
- Season: 2021–22
- Champions: Aveley
- Promoted: Aveley; Canvey Island
- Relegated: Romford; Barking
- Matches: 380
- Goals: 1,227 (3.23 per match)
- Top goalscorer: 29 goals – Thomas Richardson (Brentwood Town)
- Biggest home win: Canvey Island 13–0 Romford (9 April 2022)
- Biggest away win: Romford 0–8 Bury Town (5 March 2022)
- Highest scoring: Canvey Island 13–0 Romford (9 April 2022)
- Highest attendance: 1,314; Bury Town 1–1 Stowmarket Town (28 December 2021)
- Lowest attendance: 60; Witham Town 1–2 Great Wakering Rovers (10 December 2021)
- Total attendance: 102,600
- Average attendance: 270 (+37.1% from previous full season)

North Division consisted of 20 clubs: 17 clubs from the previous season, and three new clubs:

- Barking, transferred from the South Central Division
- Hashtag United, promoted from the Essex Senior League
- Stowmarket Town, promoted from Eastern Counties League

=== League table ===
Pos	Team	Pld	W	D	L	GF	GA	GD	Pts	Promotion, qualification or relegation
1	Aveley (C, P)	38	24	8	6	94	37	+57	80	Promoted to the Premier Division
2	Canvey Island (O, P)	38	24	6	8	100	42	+58	78	Qualified for the play-offs (Note: Four teams played for one spot and possible promotion to Level 7.)
3	Brentwood Town	38	24	3	11	73	41	+32	75	Qualified for the play-offs
4	Stowmarket Town	38	21	10	7	75	39	+36	73	Qualified for the play-offs
5	Felixstowe & Walton United	38	23	3	12	60	45	+15	72	Qualified for the play-offs
6	Grays Athletic	38	20	8	10	69	38	+31	68	
7	AFC Sudbury	38	18	9	11	57	46	+11	63	
8	Hashtag United	38	18	8	12	60	49	+11	62	
9	Maldon & Tiptree	38	18	6	14	74	63	+11	60	
10	Dereham Town	38	19	3	16	63	53	+10	60	Transferred to the Northern Premier League Division One Midlands
11	Heybridge Swifts	38	16	5	17	77	73	+4	53	
12	Bury Town	38	12	8	18	63	71	−8	44	
13	Coggeshall Town	38	11	10	17	53	68	−15	43	
14	Tilbury	38	11	8	19	57	68	−11	41	
15	Great Wakering Rovers	38	10	10	18	58	74	−16	40	
16	Hullbridge Sports	38	10	9	19	43	72	−29	39	
17	Basildon United	38	9	8	21	35	60	−25	35	Reprieved from inter-step play-off (Note: Ten of the 16 clubs at Step 4, all eight fourth-from-bottom teams and two clubs placed third-from-bottom, one at the top and the other in third place both on a points per game (PPG) basis, were reprieved from relegation.)
18	Witham Town (O)	38	7	12	19	40	71	−31	33	Qualified for the inter-step play-off (Note: Contested a one-off play-off match as one of the remaining six Step 4 teams against one of six runners-up from Step 5 that had the fewest PPG at the end of the 2021–22 season. The winner remained at Step 4 for the 2022–23 season and the loser at Step 5.)
19	Barking (R)	38	9	8	21	51	79	−28	32 (Note: Barking were deducted three points for a rule breach.)	Relegated to the Essex Senior League
20	Romford (R)	38	3	4	31	26	139	−113	13	Relegated to the Essex Senior League

Source: Isthmian League
Rules for classification: 1) points; 2) goal difference; 3) number of goals scored; 4) number of matches won; 5) head-to-head results
(C) Champions; (O) Play-off winners; (P) Promoted; (R) Relegated

==== Top scorers ====
Player	Club	Goals
Thomas Richardson	Brentwood Town	29
Abouhadje Kouassi	Canvey Island	26
Alexander Akrofi	Aveley	24
Cemal Ramadan	Bury Town	22

=== Play-offs ===
Semi-finals
2	Canvey Island	3
5	Felixstowe & Walton United	1
3	Brentwood Town	2
4	Stowmarket Town	1

Final
2	Canvey Island	1 (4)
3	Brentwood Town	1 (1)

==== Semi-finals ====
26 April 2022	Canvey Island	3–1	Felixstowe & Walton United	Canvey Island
19:45 BST	Price 2'; Kouassi 86', 91'		Nunn 65'	Stadium: Park Lane; Attendance: 1,059

26 April 2022	Brentwood Town	2–1	Stowmarket Town	Brentwood
19:45 BST	Richardson 22'; Nzala 90'		Parker 86'	Stadium: The Brentwood Centre Arena; Attendance: 897

==== Final ====
29 April 2022	Canvey Island	1–1 (a.e.t.) (4–1 p)	Brentwood Town	Canvey Island
19:45 BST	Price 38'		Richardson 4'	Stadium: Park Lane; Attendance: 2,532
	Penalties
	Hubble (penalty scored); Kouassi (penalty scored); Stewart (penalty scored); Price (penalty scored)		Harvey (penalty missed); Nzala (penalty missed); Richardson (penalty scored)

=== Inter-step play-off ===
30 April 2022	Witham Town	3–0	Saffron Walden Town	Witham
15:00 BST	McLean 41'; Osude 56'; Wallace 63'			Stadium: Spa Road; Attendance: 697

=== Results table ===
Home \ Away	SUD	AVE	BAR	BAS	BRE	BUR	CAN	COG	DER	FEL	GRA	GWR	HAS	HEY	HUL	M&T	ROM	STO	TIL	WIT
AFC Sudbury		1–1	1–0	2–0	1–0	1–4	0–3	3–0	1–3	2–0	0–0	4–2	0–0	2–0	1–2	1–0	1–1	1–3	4–2	3–2
Aveley	2–1		4–0	3–1	1–0	4–0	1–1	5–2	2–1	5–0	2–1	4–0	1–2	2–2	0–0	5–3	7–0	2–1	4–0	4–2
Barking	1–0	0–3		1–3	3–3	2–2	2–4	1–4	1–2	1–2	0–1	1–2	1–3	2–0	1–2	3–1	3–1	1–6	2–1	1–1
Basildon United	0–3	0–0	0–0		1–3	0–3	1–2	0–1	0–2	1–2	0–7	0–3	0–1	0–1	0–2	0–1	3–0	0–2	4–1	1–1
Brentwood Town	0–1	0–1	1–0	3–2		2–1	2–0	2–0	2–0	0–1	1–0	1–0	1–3	1–0	3–1	2–3	7–1	1–1	1–2	3–2
Bury Town	0–1	4–3	4–0	0–2	1–2		1–5	1–1	3–2	1–3	2–2	3–1	0–2	2–1	3–2	2–2	2–1	1–1	1–3	1–2
Canvey Island	1–1	3–1	3–2	4–1	4–2	4–0		1–0	0–1	1–0	3–1	2–3	4–0	2–0	1–1	1–4	13–0	0–1	5–1	6–0
Coggeshall Town	0–1	4–2	3–2	1–2	0–2	2–0	2–1		1–3	2–1	1–1	1–1	2–4	0–2	4–1	2–2	2–3	2–2	1–0	1–1
Dereham Town	5–1	0–4	2–0	0–0	3–0	2–1	0–1	3–0		1–3	0–1	1–1	3–1	3–1	0–1	3–3	3–0	2–1	2–1	3–1
Felixstowe & Walton United	1–2	0–2	3–0	1–1	1–0	1–0	2–0	3–0	2–0		0–1	2–1	1–0	2–3	2–1	0–3	2–0	2–1	2–1	1–1
Grays Athletic	1–1	2–1	5–2	2–0	0–2	2–1	1–3	1–1	3–0	3–0		5–1	2–1	1–0	1–0	3–2	4–0	0–2	2–2	2–3
Great Wakering Rovers	0–0	1–4	1–1	1–4	3–5	2–2	1–1	2–2	3–1	2–3	1–0		3–4	1–3	1–0	0–3	3–0	0–2	1–1	2–3
Hashtag United	3–2	0–2	1–2	2–0	1–3	0–0	1–2	1–1	2–1	0–2	0–1	1–1		1–2	3–1	3–0	2–0	3–3	1–0	5–1
Heybridge Swifts	0–5	0–1	4–4	2–0	1–4	5–2	1–4	1–3	3–1	3–2	1–3	3–2	4–3		7–1	3–2	5–1	1–2	3–3	2–2
Hullbridge Sports	1–1	0–0	0–4	0–1	1–4	2–2	2–6	2–0	3–0	1–4	0–1	1–1	1–1	2–0		3–2	2–2	1–4	0–4	0–1
Maldon & Tiptree	0–3	0–0	2–1	0–1	1–1	0–2	2–1	3–2	2–1	1–5	2–1	1–2	0–1	3–2	3–0		3–2	3–2	4–2	0–1
Romford	0–2	1–4	2–3	1–1	0–3	0–8	0–3	0–4	0–4	1–2	0–6	0–5	1–1	0–7	1–5	0–7		2–0	1–2	2–3
Stowmarket Town	3–0	2–1	2–2	0–0	0–1	3–0	2–2	5–0	3–1	2–0	1–0	2–1	0–0	1–0	0–0	1–1	4–0		1–4	3–2
Tilbury	3–1	1–1	0–1	2–5	0–1	2–1	2–2	2–0	1–3	1–1	1–1	2–1	1–2	1–2	3–0	1–2	3–0	1–4		0–0
Witham Town	2–2	1–5	0–0	0–0	0–4	1–2	0–1	1–1	0–1	0–1	1–1	1–2	0–1	2–2	0–1	0–3	0–2	1–2	1–0	

Source: Isthmian League
Legend: Blue = home team win; Yellow = draw; Red = away team win.

=== Stadiums and locations ===
Locations of North Division clubs

Club	Location	Stadium	Capacity
AFC Sudbury	Sudbury	King's Marsh	2,500
Aveley	Aveley	Parkside	3,500
Barking	Barking	Mayesbrook Park	2,500
Basildon United	Basildon	Gardiners Close	2,000
Brentwood Town	Brentwood	The Brentwood Centre Arena	1,800
Bury Town	Bury St Edmunds	Ram Meadow	3,500
Canvey Island	Canvey Island	Park Lane	4,500
Coggeshall Town	Coggeshall	West Street	2,000
Dereham Town	Dereham	Aldiss Park	3,000
Felixstowe & Walton United	Felixstowe	Dellwood Avenue	2,000
Grays Athletic	Grays	Parkside (groundshare with Aveley)	3,500
Great Wakering Rovers	Great Wakering	Burroughs Park	2,500
Hashtag United	Pitsea	Len Salmon Stadium	2,661
Heybridge Swifts	Heybridge	Scraley Road	3,000
Hullbridge Sports	Hullbridge	Lower Road	1,500
Maldon & Tiptree	Maldon	Wallace Binder Ground	2,000
Romford	Romford	Mayesbrook Park (groundshare with Barking)	2,500
Stowmarket Town	Stowmarket	Greens Meadow	1,000
Tilbury	Tilbury	Chadfields	4,000
Witham Town	Witham	Spa Road	2,500

== South Central Division ==
Isthmian League South Central Division
- Season: 2021–22
- Champions: Bracknell Town
- Promoted: Bracknell Town; Hanwell Town
- Relegated: Chalfont St Peter; Staines Town
- Matches: 342
- Goals: 1,095 (3.2 per match)
- Top goalscorer: 27 goals – Sebastian Bowerman (Bracknell Town)
- Biggest home win: Bedfont Sports 7–1 Sutton Common Rovers (20 October 2021); Marlow 6-0 Guernsey (30 November 2021)
- Biggest away win: Staines Town 0–12 Hanwell Town (11 January 2022)
- Highest scoring: Staines Town 0–12 Hanwell Town (11 January 2022)
- Highest attendance: 911; Guernsey 3–1 Sutton Common Rovers (9 October 2021)
- Lowest attendance: 33; South Park 2–0 Thatcham Town (18 September 2021)
- Total attendance: 75,726
- Average attendance: 221 (+79.7% from previous full season)

After Whyteleafe resigned from the league after losing its ground and folded, South Central Division consisted of 19 clubs: 14 clubs from the previous season, and five new clubs:

- Basingstoke Town, transferred from the Southern League
- Binfield, promoted from the Hellenic League
- Guernsey, transferred from the South East Division returning to the league after one season of absence
- Sutton Common Rovers, promoted from the Combined Counties League
- Thatcham Town, transferred from the Southern League

=== League table ===
Pos	Team	Pld	W	D	L	GF	GA	GD	Pts	Promotion, qualification or relegation
1	Bracknell Town (C, P)	36	31	3	2	90	12	+78	96	Promoted to the Southern League Premier South
2	Chertsey Town	36	23	7	6	81	40	+41	76	Qualified for the play-offs (Note: Four teams played for one spot and possible promotion to Level 7.)
3	Bedfont Sports	36	22	8	6	86	47	+39	74	Qualified for the play-offs
4	Hanwell Town (O, P)	36	21	9	6	83	37	+46	72	Qualified for the play-offs
5	Basingstoke Town	36	21	7	8	65	49	+16	70	Qualified for the play-offs
6	Uxbridge	36	19	9	8	64	42	+22	66	
7	Marlow	36	18	7	11	52	40	+12	61	
8	Binfield	36	14	11	11	57	50	+7	53	
9	South Park	36	14	9	13	67	53	+14	51	
10	Chipstead	36	12	12	12	60	52	+8	48	
11	Northwood	36	12	6	18	51	67	−16	42	
12	Thatcham Town	36	10	8	18	48	65	−17	38	
13	Ashford Town	36	12	2	22	42	60	−18	38	
14	Guernsey	36	9	9	18	60	79	−19	36	
15	Tooting & Mitcham United	36	9	7	20	42	56	−14	34	
16	Westfield	36	7	13	16	38	54	−16	34	
17	Sutton Common Rovers	36	10	4	22	46	82	−36	34	Reprieved from inter-step play-off (Note: Ten of the 16 clubs at Step 4, all eight fourth-from-bottom teams and two clubs placed third-from-bottom, one at the top and the other in third place both on a points per game (PPG) basis, were reprieved from relegation. The remaining six teams will contest one-off play-off matches with seven runners-up from Step 5 that have the fewest PPG at the end of the 2021–22 season. The winner of each match will play at Step 4 for the 2022–23 season, while each loser will also play at Step 5.)
18	Chalfont St Peter (R)	36	6	3	27	31	83	−52	21	Qualified for the inter-step play-off
19	Staines Town (R)	36	4	2	30	32	127	−95	14	Relegated to the Combined Counties League
20	Whyteleafe	0	0	0	0	0	0	0	0	Resigned from the league (Note: The FA classified Whyteleafe as relegated for reprieve and inter-step play-off purposes, having resigned "after the Isthmian League AGM" but during the season.)

Source: Isthmian League
Rules for classification: 1) points; 2) goal difference; 3) number of goals scored; 4) number of matches won; 5) head-to-head results
(C) Champions; (O) Play-off winners; (P) Promoted; (R) Relegated

==== Top scorers ====
Player	Club	Goals
Sebastian Bowerman	Bracknell Town	27
Jake Baxter	Chertsey Town	23
Thomas Collins	Chipstead; Hanwell Town	23
Daniel Williams	Tooting & Mitcham United; Bedfont Sports	22

=== Play-offs ===
Semi-finals
2	Chertsey Town	4
5	Basingstoke Town	1
3	Bedfont Sports	1
4	Hanwell Town	3

Final
2	Chertsey Town	2
4	Hanwell Town	3

==== Semi-finals ====
27 April 2022	Chertsey Town	4–1	Basingstoke Town	Chertsey
19:45 BST	Crossley 8'; Ndombe 50'; Lodge 89'; Abisogun 90'		Sheridan 90'	Stadium: Alwyns Lane; Attendance: 1,109

27 April 2022	Bedfont Sports	1–3	Hanwell Town	Bedfont
19:45 BST	Webb 22'		Rush 8'; Obi 35'; Chendlik 38'	Stadium: Bedfont Recreation Ground; Attendance: 388

==== Final ====
1 May 2022	Chertsey Town	2–3 (a.e.t.)	Hanwell Town	Chertsey
15:00 BST	Lodge 90'; Taylor 95'		Duncan 32'; Obi 113'; Collins 105'	Stadium: Alwyns Lane; Attendance: 1,763

=== Inter-step play-off ===
30 April 2022	Chalfont St Peter	0–4	Boldmere St Michaels	Chalfont St Peter
15:00 BST			Daley 29'; Byrne 33', 70'; McSkeane 63'	Stadium: Mill Meadow; Attendance: 313

=== Results table ===
Home \ Away	ASH	BAS	BED	BIN	BRA	CHA	CHE	CHI	GUE	HAN	MAR	NOR	SOU	STA	SCR	THA	TOO	UXB	WES
Ashford Town		2–3	2–3	1–2	0–4	2–0	1–2	0–3	3–2	0–1	0–1	1–2	2–1	1–0	1–2	2–1	2–1	1–2	2–4
Basingstoke Town	1–0		2–4	1–4	0–1	2–2	1–5	2–1	2–0	2–1	0–1	1–3	3–2	4–0	0–3	4–3	3–2	1–1	2–2
Bedfont Sports	2–1	1–4		2–1	1–1	6–0	1–1	2–1	3–1	3–3	4–1	2–0	3–0	4–0	7–1	4–0	5–4	1–1	1–0
Binfield	1–1	0–1	1–3		1–3	1–2	0–1	1–2	1–1	1–5	1–1	0–1	2–1	4–0	1–1	2–2	1–0	0–0	3–0
Bracknell Town	4–0	2–1	2–1	5–0		5–0	0–1	5–0	2–0	3–0	0–1	3–0	2–0	3–1	2–1	2–0	0–0	1–0	4–0
Chalfont St Peter	2–0	0–2	0–2	0–3	0–2		0–1	4–1	1–2	1–2	0–2	1–0	0–1	0–2	3–2	0–4	0–1	1–2	1–1
Chertsey Town	2–0	0–0	0–1	2–0	0–3	6–1		2–4	4–0	1–2	2–1	2–4	3–3	3–1	2–0	2–2	4–2	1–3	1–0
Chipstead	1–1	0–1	1–0	2–2	0–2	5–1	2–2		3–0	0–0	1–1	0–1	3–1	0–1	1–1	3–1	0–0	1–1	3–0
Guernsey	1–2	4–4	3–4	1–3	0–3	2–1	0–1	3–3		1–4	2–0	2–0	1–1	6–2	3–1	2–2	1–2	1–1	2–2
Hanwell Town	3–0	1–1	3–0	1–3	1–1	3–0	0–1	1–2	4–1		1–1	2–1	3–3	6–5	5–1	0–0	3–1	3–0	1–1
Marlow	3–0	0–0	3–2	3–0	1–3	2–0	0–3	2–1	6–0	0–1		1–0	3–0	4–2	4–1	0–1	1–0	1–1	1–0
Northwood	0–3	0–1	0–0	0–3	0–2	2–1	1–4	1–1	1–1	0–3	1–0		1–5	5–0	2–3	0–1	2–2	1–7	1–1
South Park	1–0	0–1	1–1	2–2	1–2	4–0	1–4	2–4	6–1	0–0	5–0	3–1		0–0	2–1	2–0	2–0	4–2	0–0
Staines Town	0–5	0–1	2–4	0–4	0–3	0–2	2–3	0–5	2–8	0–12	1–1	1–8	0–2		0–2	2–6	2–0	0–4	3–1
Sutton Common Rovers	1–0	1–5	0–1	2–3	1–7	4–2	1–5	3–0	0–2	0–1	1–1	1–2	0–6	5–0		1–0	0–2	0–4	2–4
Thatcham Town	0–2	2–3	3–3	0–1	0–4	3–2	0–5	1–1	0–3	1–3	0–2	1–1	3–1	4–0	0–2		0–1	1–0	1–1
Tooting & Mitcham United	0–1	0–1	0–1	0–2	0–1	2–1	1–2	2–1	1–1	0–2	1–2	7–3	1–1	3–1	1–1	1–2		1–1	1–0
Uxbridge	2–0	0–2	3–2	2–2	0–1	3–1	1–3	2–1	3–2	2–0	2–0	0–2	2–1	2–1	2–0	3–2	3–2		2–1
Westfield	2–3	0–2	1–1	1–1	0–2	1–1	1–1	2–2	1–0	0–2	3–1	1–4	1–2	2–0	1–0	0–1	3–0	0–0	

Source: Isthmian League
Legend: Blue = home team win; Yellow = draw; Red = away team win.

=== Stadiums and locations ===
Locations of South Central Division clubs
Greater London South Central Division clubs

Club	Location	Stadium	Capacity
Ashford Town	Ashford, Surrey	Robert Parker Stadium	2,550
Basingstoke Town	Basingstoke	Winklebury Football Complex	2,000
Bedfont Sports	Bedfont	Bedfont Recreation Ground	3,000
Binfield	Binfield	Hill Farm Lane	1,000
Bracknell Town	Sandhurst	SB Stadium	1,108
Chalfont St Peter	Chalfont St Peter	Mill Meadow	1,500
Chertsey Town	Chertsey	Alwyns Lane	2,500
Chipstead	Chipstead	High Road	2,000
Guernsey	Saint Peter Port	Footes Lane	5,000
Hanwell Town	Perivale	Powerday Stadium	3,000
Marlow	Marlow	Alfred Davis Memorial Ground	3,000
Northwood	Northwood	Northwood Park	3,075
South Park	Reigate	King George's Field	2,000
Staines Town	Staines-upon-Thames	Wheatsheaf Park	3,000
Thatcham Town	Thatcham	Waterside Park	1,500
Tooting & Mitcham United	Mitcham	Imperial Fields	3,500
Uxbridge	West Drayton	Honeycroft	3,770
Westfield	Woking (Westfield)	Woking Park	1,000

== South East Division ==
Isthmian League South East Division
- Season: 2021–22
- Champions: Hastings United
- Promoted: Hastings United; Herne Bay
- Relegated: Phoenix Sports; Whistable Town
- Matches: 380
- Goals: 1,073 (2.82 per match)
- Top goalscorer: 22 goals – Zak Ansah (Herne Bay)
- Biggest home win: Herne Bay 6–0 Three Bridges (28 August 2021)
- Biggest away win: Sittingbourne 0–6 Cray Valley Paper Mills (23 October 2021)
- Highest scoring: Herne Bay 7-2 Whitstable Town (28 December 2021)
- Highest attendance: 3,082; Hastings United 0–0 Haywards Heath Town (2 April 2022)
- Lowest attendance: 58; Phoenix Sports 2–5 Haywards Heath Town (2 October 2021)
- Total attendance: 121,714
- Average attendance: 320 (+54.6% from previous full season)

South East Division consisted of 20 clubs: 18 clubs from the previous season, and two new clubs:

- Corinthian (Kent), promoted from the Southern Counties East League
- Lancing, promoted from the Southern Combination League

=== League table ===
Pos	Team	Pld	W	D	L	GF	GA	GD	Pts	Promotion, qualification or relegation
1	Hastings United (C, P)	38	27	4	7	82	33	+49	85	Promoted to the Premier Division
2	Ashford United	38	22	6	10	79	48	+31	72	Qualified for the play-offs (Note: Four teams played for one spot and possible promotion to Level 7.)
3	Herne Bay (O, P)	38	21	7	10	63	34	+29	70	Qualified for the play-offs
4	Haywards Heath Town	38	19	10	9	51	33	+18	67	Qualified for the play-offs
5	Cray Valley Paper Mills	38	19	9	10	70	48	+22	66	Qualified for the play-offs
6	Ramsgate	38	20	5	13	80	52	+28	65	
7	Burgess Hill Town	38	18	8	12	57	47	+10	62	
8	Corinthian	38	16	11	11	50	39	+11	59	
9	VCD Athletic	38	15	9	14	66	54	+12	54	
10	Sittingbourne	38	15	7	16	47	51	−4	52	
11	Chichester City	38	13	10	15	48	43	+5	49	
12	Faversham Town	38	14	7	17	43	56	−13	49	
13	Sevenoaks Town	38	15	3	20	54	66	−12	48	
14	Three Bridges	38	11	11	16	60	75	−15	44	
15	East Grinstead Town	38	10	11	17	36	66	−30	41	
16	Whitehawk	38	9	12	17	39	54	−15	39	
17	Hythe Town	38	10	9	19	40	72	−32	39	Reprieved from inter-step play-off (Note: Ten of the 16 clubs at Step 4, all eight fourth-from-bottom teams and two clubs placed third-from-bottom, one at the top and the other in third place both on a points per game (PPG) basis, were reprieved from relegation. The remaining six teams will contest one-off play-off matches with seven runners-up from Step 5 that have the fewest PPG at the end of the 2021–22 season. The winner of each match will play at Step 4 for the 2022–23 season, while each loser will also play at Step 5.)
18	Lancing (O)	38	9	9	20	34	65	−31	36	Qualified for the inter-step play-off
19	Phoenix Sports (R)	38	9	6	23	35	64	−29	33	Relegated to the Southern Counties East League
20	Whitstable Town (R)	38	8	6	24	39	73	−34	30	Relegated to the Southern Counties East League

Source: Football Web Pages
Rules for classification: 1) points; 2) goal difference; 3) number of goals scored; 4) number of matches won; 5) head-to-head results
(C) Champions; (O) Play-off winners; (P) Promoted; (R) Relegated

==== Top scorers ====
Player	Club	Goals
Zak Ansah	Herne Bay	22
Joshua Ajayi	Ramsgate	21
Marcel Barrington	Cray Valley PM	20
Daniel Perry	Three Bridges	20

=== Play-offs ===
Semi-finals
2	Ashford United	1
5	Cray Valley Paper Mills	0
3	Herne Bay	3 (6)
4	Haywards Heath Town	3 (5)

Final
2	Ashford United	0
3	Herne Bay	2

==== Semi-finals ====
26 April 2022	Ashford United	1–0	Cray Valley Paper Mills	Kingsnorth
19:45 BST	May 6'			Stadium: The Homelands; Attendance: 753

26 April 2022	Herne Bay	3–3 (a.e.t.) (6-5 p)	Haywards Heath Town	Herne Bay
19:45 BST	Ansah 15'; Parter 46'; Campbell 91'		Rowe 18'; Lafflin 90'; Morrison 97'	Stadium: Winch's Field; Attendance: 1,102

==== Final ====
30 April 2022	Ashford United	0–2	Herne Bay	Kingsnorth
15:00 BST			Campbell 67'; Millbank 84' (pen.)	Stadium: The Homelands; Attendance: 1,865

=== Inter-step play-off ===
30 April 2022	Lancing	2–1	Newhaven	Lancing
15:00 BST	Jammeh 52', 56'		Robinson 47'	Stadium: Culver Road; Attendance: 702

=== Results table ===
Home \ Away	ASH	BUR	CHI	COR	CRA	EAS	FAV	HAS	HAY	HER	HYT	LAN	PHO	RAM	SEV	SIT	THR	VCD	WHK	WHT
Ashford United		3–1	2–2	3–1	3–1	2–1	2–2	1–2	2–3	2–1	4–0	2–2	0–2	4–2	4–0	1–0	0–0	3–1	1–2	2–0
Burgess Hill Town	2–0		2–2	0–2	3–2	1–0	1–0	2–3	1–1	0–0	3–0	2–2	0–2	1–2	3–2	4–1	0–0	2–0	1–0	0–0
Chichester City	3–2	2–1		0–3	0–2	1–1	5–1	0–2	0–1	0–1	1–1	4–0	2–0	0–2	1–0	1–1	1–0	0–3	6–1	2–1
Corinthian	0–0	0–1	0–2		1–1	3–1	0–1	2–1	0–0	0–0	2–1	1–0	2–0	2–1	1–1	1–4	1–1	3–0	0–4	1–1
Cray Valley Paper Mills	1–0	0–1	0–0	1–0		0–0	0–1	1–2	1–1	2–1	4–0	1–2	1–0	4–1	3–0	2–1	1–2	0–3	1–1	2–1
East Grinstead Town	0–4	3–2	1–0	0–0	5–3		1–0	0–4	1–1	0–0	0–1	1–1	1–0	0–2	2–1	2–4	3–1	0–3	1–1	3–1
Faversham Town	3–1	2–0	2–1	0–3	0–4	1–1		1–1	3–1	1–0	1–2	1–0	2–0	2–3	1–2	3–1	3–1	0–0	1–0	1–2
Hastings United	1–3	2–3	2–0	3–0	1–2	5–0	4–0		0–0	1–1	3–0	1–0	3–1	2–0	1–2	2–1	2–0	3–0	2–0	4–1
Haywards Heath Town	2–1	2–1	1–0	0–0	2–3	3–0	1–0	2–0		0–1	0–1	0–0	1–0	1–0	2–1	2–0	2–3	1–2	0–0	2–0
Herne Bay	0–3	0–0	1–0	1–0	1–2	4–0	2–0	0–2	0–1		2–0	2–1	2–0	1–3	2–1	1–1	6–0	3–0	2–1	7–2
Hythe Town	1–2	1–5	2–1	1–2	2–4	1–1	2–1	0–3	0–1	1–2		1–1	1–1	0–3	0–1	2–1	2–2	0–4	2–2	0–3
Lancing	1–2	2–1	0–0	0–3	2–4	2–0	1–1	0–2	0–1	1–6	0–1		0–2	1–2	2–1	0–1	4–3	1–1	1–1	1–0
Phoenix Sports	0–2	5–2	0–4	0–1	0–0	1–2	0–1	2–4	2–5	0–3	0–0	1–0		1–3	0–3	2–1	2–3	1–1	2–3	2–0
Ramsgate	2–3	2–4	2–2	1–3	1–1	3–0	2–1	3–2	0–1	2–0	3–3	4–0	4–0		2–1	0–1	2–0	1–2	3–1	6–1
Sevenoaks Town	0–3	1–3	1–1	1–0	3–0	2–0	3–1	1–4	1–2	3–1	3–1	2–3	2–0	0–5		4–0	2–4	4–1	0–3	0–1
Sittingbourne	1–1	0–1	0–1	0–2	0–6	0–0	3–1	1–2	3–0	0–2	2–1	4–0	2–1	0–0	1–0		1–1	1–0	3–1	3–2
Three Bridges	5–1	1–2	1–0	3–2	1–3	1–2	1–1	1–2	1–6	2–3	3–3	1–0	2–3	2–2	2–2	1–1		3–4	2–1	3–1
VCD Athletic	1–3	2–0	1–2	1–4	2–2	4–1	4–1	2–2	1–1	0–0	1–2	4–0	1–1	2–1	5–0	0–1	3–1		2–3	3–0
Whitehawk	1–4	0–0	1–1	2–2	1–1	1–0	1–1	0–1	0–0	1–2	0–2	1–2	0–0	2–1	0–1	1–0	0–1	2–1		0–1
Whitstable Town	1–3	0–1	1–0	2–2	3–4	2–2	0–1	0–1	3–2	1–2	0–2	0–1	1–0	1–4	1–2	0–2	1–1	1–1	3–0	

Source: Football Web Pages
Legend: Blue = home team win; Yellow = draw; Red = away team win.

=== Stadiums and locations ===
Locations of South East Division clubs
Greater London Premier Division football clubs

Club	Location	Stadium	Capacity
Ashford United	Ashford, Kent	The Homelands	3,200
Burgess Hill Town	Burgess Hill	Leylands Park	2,500
Chichester City	Chichester	Oaklands Park	2,000
Corinthian	Hartley	Gay Dawn Farm	n/a
Cray Valley Paper Mills	Eltham	Badgers Sports Ground	1,000
East Grinstead Town	East Grinstead	East Court	1,500
Faversham Town	Faversham	Salters Lane	2,000
Hastings United	Hastings	The Pilot Field	4,050
Haywards Heath Town	Haywards Heath	Hanbury Park	2,000
Herne Bay	Herne Bay	Winch's Field	4,000
Hythe Town	Hythe	Reachfields Stadium	3,000
Lancing	Lancing	Culver Road	1,500
Phoenix Sports	Barnehurst	The Mayplace Ground	2,000
Ramsgate	Ramsgate	Southwood Stadium	2,500
Sevenoaks Town	Sevenoaks	Greatness Park	1,000
Sittingbourne	Sittingbourne	Woodstock Park	3,000
Three Bridges	Crawley (Three Bridges)	Jubilee Field	1,500
VCD Athletic	Crayford	Oakwood	1,400
Whitehawk	Brighton (Whitehawk)	The Enclosed Ground	3,126
Whitstable Town	Whitstable	The Belmont Ground	3,000

== Relegation reprieves ==
=== Step 3 ===
Seven clubs at Step 3, all four fourth-from-bottom teams and those placed third-from-bottom that were the top three on a points per game (PPG) basis, were reprieved from relegation. The remaining team was relegated to Step 4.

The final points-per-game ranking of the third-from-bottom placed teams in Step 3 divisions was as follows:

Pos	Team	League	Pld	Pts	PPG	Qualification
5	Basford United	Northern Premier League Premier Division	42	45	1.071	Retention at Step 3
6	Barwell	Southern League Premier Division Central	40	41	1.025	Retention at Step 3
7	Kings Langley	Southern League Premier Division South	42	37	0.881	Retention at Step 3
8	Leatherhead	Isthmian League Premier Division	42	36	0.857	Relegation to Step 4

=== Step 4 ===
Ten of the 16 clubs at Step 4, all eight fourth-from-bottom teams and two clubs placed third-from-bottom, one at the top and the other in third place on a points per game (PPG) basis, were reprieved from contesting relegation play-offs. The FA granted third-placed Sheffield a reprieve after demoting Yorkshire Amateur for non-compliance with Step 4 ground grading requirements. The remaining six teams contested one-off matches with sixrunners-up from Step 5 that had the fewest PPG at the end of the 2021–22 season. Three clubs won winners of their matches and stayed at Step 4 for the 2022–23 season, while three others lost theirs and were relegated to Step 5.

The final points-per-game ranking of the 3rd-from-bottom-placed teams in Step 4 divisions was also as follows:

Pos	Team	League	Pld	Pts	PPG	Qualification
9	Prescot Cables	Northern Premier League Division One West	38	39	1.026	Retention at Step 4
10	Lancing	Isthmian League South East Division	38	36	0.947	Relegation match with a Step 5 team
11	Sheffield	Northern Premier League Division One East	36	33	0.917	Retention at Step 4
12	Witham Town	Isthmian League North Division	38	33	0.863	Relegation match with a Step 5 team
13	Cinderford Town	Southern League Division One South	36	31	0.861	Relegation match with a Step 5 team
14	Kempston Rovers	Southern League Division One Central	38	29	0.763	Relegation match with a Step 5 team
15	Histon	Northern Premier League Division One Midlands	38	24	0.632	Relegation match with a Step 5 team
16	Chalfont St Peter	Isthmian League South Central Division	36	21	0.583	Relegation match with a Step 5 team

== League Cup ==
2021–22 Alan Turvey Trophy
Tournament details
- Country: England
- Teams: 60

Final positions
- Champions: Horsham
- Runners-up: Margate

The 2021–22 Velocity Trophy (formerly the Isthmian League Cup) was the 48th season of the Alan Turvey Trophy, the cup competition of the whole Isthmian League. 60 of the 82 teams in the Isthmian League participated this season, with the other 22 opting not to participate.

Enfield Town were the defending champions, having beaten AFC Hornchurch in the 2018–19 season—the most recent season in which the competition was fully completed following the abandonment of the 2019–20 competition due to the COVID-19 pandemic. The competition was not held during the 2020–21 season.

This season's competition reverted to a straight knock out format. If a game finished level after 90 minutes, the match went straight to penalties—there was no extra time. Clubs were allowed to name and use 5 substitutes per match.

=== Calendar ===
Round	Dates	Matches	Clubs
First round	2 November to 30 November	12	60 → 48
Second round	16 November to 11 January	16	48 → 32
Third round	18 January to 22 February	16	32 → 16
Fourth round	21 February to 10 March	8	16 → 8
Quarter-finals	8 March to 17 March	4	8 → 4
Semi-finals	22 March	2	4 → 2
Final	13 April	1	2 → 1

=== First round ===
Twenty-four clubs participated in the first round, while thirty-six clubs received a bye to the second round

Tie	Home team (tier)	Score	Away team (tier)	Att.
1	Cray Valley Paper Mills (SE)	2–1	Hullbridge Sports (N)	62
2	Maldon & Tiptree (N)	2–0	Aveley (N)	168
3	Three Bridges (SE)	0–0	Sittingbourne (SE)	51
Sittingbourne advanced 5–4 on penalties
4	Hashtag United (N)	1–3	Corinthian (SE)	141
5	Faversham Town (SE)	2–1	Sutton Common Rovers (SC)	135
6	Bracknell Town (SC)	1–1	Westfield (SC)	102
Westfield advanced 7–6 on penalties
7	Burgess Hill Town (SE)	1–1	Uxbridge (SC)	120
Burgess Hill Town advanced 5–4 on penalties
8	Chichester City (SE)	0–0	Hanwell Town	105
Chichester City advanced 3–1 on penalties
9	Coggeshall Town (N)	2–2	AFC Sudbury (N)	109
AFC Sudbury advanced 3–1 on penalties
10	Felixstowe & Walton United (N)	1–1	Witham Town (N)	159
Felixstowe & Walton United advanced 5–4 on penalties
11	Herne Bay (SE)	6–1	East Grinstead Town (SE)	178
12	Chertsey Town (SC)	5–2	Chalfont St Peter (SC)	175

=== Second round ===
The twelve clubs who made it through the first round were joined in the draw by twenty clubs who got a bye through the previous round, making thirty-two clubs.

Tie	Home team (tier)	Score	Away team (tier)	Att.
13	Phoenix Sports (SE)	1–3	Great Wakering Rovers (N)	56
14	Tilbury (N)	0–2	Brentwood Town (N)	136
15	Ashford United (SE)	2–1	Burgess Hill Town (SE)	99
16	Basildon United (N)	2–3	Romford (N)	57
17	Haywards Heath Town (SE)	1–1	Ramsgate (SE)	80
Haywards Heath Town advanced 7–6 on penalties
18	Tooting & Mitcham United (SC)	2–1	Sittingbourne (SE)	60
19	Grays Athletic (N)	0–0	Barking (N)	86
Barking advanced 5–4 on penalties
20	Maldon & Tiptree (N)	1–0	Heybridge Swifts (N)	223
21	Marlow (SC)	1–2	Chertsey Town (SC)	119
22	AFC Sudbury (N)	1–1	Cray Valley Paper Mills (SE)	98
Cray Valley Paper Mills advanced 5–3 on penalties
23	Ashford Town (Middlesex) (SC)	0–1	Binfield (SC)	73
24	Chichester City (SE)	2–1	Westfield (SC)	120
25	Corinthian (SE)	2–1	Sevenoaks Town (SE)	78
26	Herne Bay (SE)	1–2	Whitstable Town (SE)	511
27	Hythe Town (SE)	5–1	South Park (SC)	115
28	Thatcham Town (SC)	1–2	Faversham Town (SE)	46

=== Third round ===
All Premier Division sides participating in the competition received a bye to the third round. They joined the sixteen clubs that advanced past the Second round.

Tie	Home team (tier)	Score	Away team (tier)	Att.
29	Chichester City (SE)	3–5	Folkestone Invicta (P)	125
30	Chertsey Town (SC)	2–4	Corinthian-Casuals (P)	165
31	Cray Valley Paper Mills (SE)	2–0	Felixstowe & Walton United (N))	56
32	Faversham Town (SE)	0–0	Corinthian (SE)	
Faversham Town F.C. won 3–1 on penalties—Corinthian ended up advancing to the fourth round in place of Faversham Town
33	Haywards Heath Town (SE)	3–3	Ashford United (SE)	117
Haywards Heath Town advanced 5–4 on penalties
34	Romford (N)	0–7	East Thurrock United (P)	66
35	Carshalton Athletic (P)	1–0	Merstham (P)	232
36	Binfield (SC)	1–3	Tooting & Mitcham United (SC)	64
37	Enfield Town (P)	3–3	Barking (N)	206
Barking advanced 4–3 on penalties
38	Horsham (P)	3–1	Hythe Town (SE)	261
39	Maldon & Tiptree (N)	0–2	Brightlingsea Regent (P)	172
40	Margate (P)	2–1	Herne Bay (SE)	325
41	Kingstonian (P)	0–1	Worthing (P)	173
42	Bowers & Pitsea (P)	3–1	Great Wakering Rovers (N)	126
43	Cheshunt (P)	4–2	Brentwood Town (N)	118
N/A	Whitstable Town (SE)	w/o	Haringey Borough (P)	N/A

=== Fourth round ===
Tie	Home team (tier)	Score	Away team (tier)	Att.
44	Carshalton Athletic (P)	4–2	Corinthian (SE)	126
45	Barking (N)	1–1	East Thurrock United (P)	74
Barking advanced 5–3 on penalties
46	Brightlingsea Regent (P)	0–1	Haringey Borough (P)	83
47	Folkestone Invicta (P)	1–0	Cray Valley Paper Mills (SE)	276
48	Haywards Heath Town (SE)	3–2	Worthing (P)	325
49	Horsham (P)	5–0	Corinthian-Casuals (P)	351
50	Margate (P)	2–1	Tooting & Mitcham United (SC)	160
51	Bowers & Pitsea (P)	0–2	Cheshunt (P)	115

=== Quarter-finals ===
Tie	Home team (tier)	Score	Away team (tier)	Att.
52	Folkestone Invicta (P)	2–1	Barking (N)	304
53	Horsham (P)	2–0	Haywards Heath Town (SE)	378
54	Margate (P)	4–1	Carshalton Athletic (P)	238
55	Haringey Borough (P)	2–1	Cheshunt (P)	118

=== Semi-finals ===
Tie	Home team (tier)	Score	Away team (tier)	Att.
56	Haringey Borough (P)	2–3	Margate (P)	211
57	Horsham (P)	5–0	Folkestone Invicta (P)	424

=== Final ===
13 April 2022	Horsham (P)	4–0	Margate (P)	Parkside, Aveley
19:45 BST	Harding 23'; Brivio 33', 49'; Hester-Cook 63'	Report		Attendance: 809

== See also ==
- Isthmian League
- 2021–22 Northern Premier League
- 2021–22 Southern Football League
