= 2021–22 Combined Counties Football League =

Combined Counties Football League
- Season: 2021–22
- Champions: Beckenham Town; Hanworth Villa
- Promoted: Beckenham Town; Hanworth Villa; Southall; Walton & Hersham
- Relegated: Chalvey Sports

The 2021–22 Combined Counties Football League season (known as the 2021–22 Cherry Red Records Combined Counties Football League for sponsorship reasons) was the 44th in the history of the Combined Counties Football League, a football competition in England. Teams were divided for the first time into three divisions: the Premier North, the Premier South and the First.

The constitution was announced on 18 May 2021.

After the abandonment of the 2019–20 and 2020–21 seasons due to the COVID-19 pandemic, a number of promotions were decided on a points per game basis over the previous two seasons.

== Premier Division North ==
The new Premier Division North consists of 18 clubs. Seven of these participated in the old Premier Division last season, and were joined by 11 new clubs:

- Four transferred from the Hellenic League Premier Division:
  - Burnham
  - Reading City
  - Virginia Water
  - Windsor
- Three transferred from the Spartan South Midlands League Premier Division:
  - Edgware Town
  - North Greenford United
  - Wembley
- One transferred from the Wessex League Premier Division:
  - Tadley Calleva
- Two promoted from the Hellenic League Division One East:
  - Holyport
  - Wokingham & Emmbrook
- One promoted from the Spartan South Midlands League Division One:
  - St Panteleimon

=== League table ===
Pos	Team	Pld	W	D	L	GF	GA	GD	Pts	Promotion, qualification or relegation
1	Hanworth Villa (C, P)	34	30	4	0	90	14	+76	94	Promoted to the Isthmian League
2	Southall (P)	34	25	4	5	85	28	+57	79 (Note: Southall were promoted as they were one of ten runners-up at Step 5 promoted on a PPG (points per game) basis.)	Promoted to the Isthmian League
3	Egham Town	34	20	9	5	58	29	+29	69	
4	Abbey Rangers	34	22	2	10	72	45	+27	68	Transferred to the Premier Division South
5	North Greenford United	34	19	4	11	100	60	+40	61	
6	Ascot United	34	16	10	8	66	49	+17	58	
7	Windsor	34	13	8	13	60	59	+1	47	
8	Edgware Town	34	13	7	14	68	60	+8	46	
9	Reading City	34	12	8	14	63	68	−5	44	
10	Tadley Calleva	34	12	6	16	66	71	−5	42	Transferred to the Premier Division South
11	Spelthorne Sports	34	12	5	17	46	54	−8	41	
12	St Panteleimon	34	11	5	18	60	69	−9	38	Transferred to the Spartan South Midlands League
13	Burnham	34	9	7	18	51	95	−44	34	
14	Wembley	34	9	6	19	49	73	−24	33	
15	Virginia Water	34	9	5	20	43	70	−27	32	
16	Wokingham & Emmbrook	34	7	8	19	41	63	−22	29	
17	Holyport	34	7	4	23	33	74	−41	25	Reprieved from relegation (Note: Holyport were one of the twelve clubs with the most PPG (points per game) out of 16 second-bottom clubs at Step 5, and were reprieved from relegation.)
18	CB Hounslow United (R)	34	7	4	23	25	95	−70	25	Relegated to Division One

Source: CCL Prem Div North Table
Rules for classification: 1) points; 2) goal difference; 3) number of goals scored.
(C) Champions; (P) Promoted; (R) Relegated

=== Stadia and locations ===
Location of the clubs in the 2021–22 Combined Counties League Premier Division North (Berkshire)
Location of the clubs in the 2021–22 Combined Counties League Premier Division North (Greater London)

Club	Location	Stadium	Capacity
Abbey Rangers	Addlestone	Addlestone Moor	1,000
Ascot United	Ascot	Ascot Racecourse	1,150
Burnham	Burnham	The 1878 Stadium	2,500
CB Hounslow United	Hounslow	Green Lane	2,100
Edgware Town	Kingsbury	Silver Jubilee Park (Note: Groundshare with Hendon)	1,990
Egham Town	Egham	Runnymede Stadium	5,500
Hanworth Villa	Hanworth	Rectory Meadow	1,000
Holyport	Maidenhead	Summerleaze Village	1,000
North Greenford United	Greenford	Berkeley Fields	2,000
Reading City	Reading	Rivermoor Stadium	2,000
Southall	Stanwell	Robert Parker Stadium	2,550
Spelthorne Sports	Ashford	Spelthorne Sports Club	1,000
St. Panteleimon	Enfield	Queen Elizabeth II Stadium (Note: Groundshare with Enfield Town)	2,500
Tadley Calleva	Tadley	Barlows Park	1,000
Virginia Water	Windsor	Stag Meadow (Note: Groundshare with Windsor)	4,500
Wembley	Wembley	Vale Farm	2,450
Windsor	Windsor	Stag Meadow	4,500
Wokingham & Emmbrook	Wokingham	Lowther Road	1,000

== Premier Division South ==
The new Premier Division South consists of 20 clubs. Twelve of these participated in the old Premier Division last season, and were joined by eight new clubs:

- Three transferred from the Southern Counties East League Premier Division:
  - AFC Croydon Athletic
  - Balham
  - Beckenham Town
- One transferred from the Southern Combination League Premier Division:
  - Horley Town
- One transferred from the Wessex League Premier Division:
  - Fleet Town
- Three promoted from the Combined Counties League Division One:
  - Farnham Town
  - Jersey Bulls
  - Walton & Hersham

=== League table ===
Pos	Team	Pld	W	D	L	GF	GA	GD	Pts	Promotion, qualification or relegation
1	Beckenham Town (C, P)	38	29	5	4	107	33	+74	92	Promoted to the Isthmian League
2	Walton & Hersham (P)	38	28	7	3	93	29	+64	91 (Note: Walton & Hersham were promoted as they were one of ten runners-up at Step 5 promoted on a PPG (points per game) basis.)	Promoted to the Isthmian League
3	Raynes Park Vale	38	26	6	6	100	39	+61	84	
4	Jersey Bulls	38	24	9	5	98	34	+64	81	
5	Badshot Lea	38	24	9	5	98	47	+51	81	
6	Redhill	38	19	9	10	75	46	+29	66	
7	Horley Town	38	17	6	15	63	64	−1	57	
8	Balham	38	16	5	17	66	54	+12	53	
9	Sheerwater	38	16	5	17	71	81	−10	53	
10	Farnham Town	38	13	7	18	62	71	−9	46	
11	Knaphill	38	10	15	13	57	67	−10	45	
12	Camberley Town	38	13	5	20	43	60	−17	44	
13	Colliers Wood United	38	12	6	20	46	64	−18	42	
14	Cobham	38	10	11	17	49	64	−15	41	
15	Guildford City	38	11	7	20	54	85	−31	40	
16	Fleet Town	38	12	2	24	59	85	−26	38	
17	Frimley Green	38	11	5	22	41	86	−45	38	
18	AFC Croydon Athletic	38	8	11	19	49	82	−33	35	
19	Banstead Athletic	38	7	7	24	45	91	−46	28	Reprieved from relegation (Note: Banstead Athletic were one of the twelve clubs with the most PPG (points per game) out of 16 second-bottom clubs at Step 5, and were reprieved from relegation.)
20	Molesey (R)	38	2	7	29	33	127	−94	13	Relegated to Division One

Source: CCL Prem Div South Table
Rules for classification: 1) points; 2) goal difference; 3) number of goals scored.
(C) Champions; (P) Promoted; (R) Relegated

=== Stadia and locations ===
Map showing the location of teams in Division 2
Location of the clubs in the 2021–22 Combined Counties League Premier Division South (Surrey)
Location of the clubs in the 2021–22 Combined Counties League Premier Division South (Greater London)
Location of the clubs in the 2021–22 Combined Counties League Premier Division South (Channel Islands)

Club	Location	Stadium	Capacity
AFC Croydon Athletic	Thornton Heath	Mayfield Stadium	3,000
Badshot Lea	Wrecclesham	Westfield Lane	1,200
Balham	Thornton Heath	Mayfield Stadium (Note: Groundshare with AFC Croydon Athletic)	3,000
Banstead Athletic	Tadworth	Merland Rise	1,500
Beckenham Town	Beckenham	Eden Park Avenue	4,000
Camberley Town	Camberley	Krooner Park	1,976
Cobham	Cobham	Leg O'Mutton Field	2,000
Colliers Wood United	Wimbledon	Wibbandune Sports Ground	2,000
Farnham Town	Farnham	Memorial Ground	1,500
Fleet Town	Fleet	Calthorpe Park	2,000
Frimley Green	Frimley Green	Recreation Ground	2,000
Guildford City	Guildford	Spectrum Football Ground	1,320
Horley Town	Horley	The New Defence	1,800
Jersey Bulls	Saint Helier	Springfield Stadium	2,000
Knaphill	Knaphill	Redding Way	1,000
Molesey	West Molesey	Walton Road	4,000
Raynes Park Vale	Raynes Park	Prince George's Playing Fields	1,500
Redhill	Redhill	Kiln Brow	2,000
Sheerwater	Sheerwater	Eastwood Centre	600
Walton & Hersham	Walton-on-Thames	Elmbridge Sports Hub	2,500

== Division One ==
Division One was increased from 20 to 21 clubs after Farnham Town, Jersey Bulls and Walton & Hersham were promoted to the Premier Division South; Dorking Wanderers Reserves, Epsom & Ewell and Godalming Town were transferred to the Southern Combination; Chessington & Hook United, Tooting Bec and Westside were transferred to the Southern Counties East League; and Ash United and Fleet Spurs were transferred to the Wessex League. The remaining nine clubs were joined by twelve new clubs:

- Five transferred from the Hellenic League Division One East:
  - A.F.C. Aldermaston
  - Chalvey Sports
  - Langley
  - Wallingford Town (after appeal)
  - Woodley United
- Four transferred from the Spartan South Midlands League Division One:
  - Enfield Borough
  - Hillingdon Borough
  - London Lions
  - Rayners Lane
- Two promoted from the Middlesex County League:
  - Hilltop
  - London Samurai Rovers
- One promoted from the Thames Valley Premier League:
  - Berks County

=== League table ===
Pos	Team	Pld	W	D	L	GF	GA	GD	Pts	Promotion, qualification or relegation
1	London Lions (C, P)	40	32	4	4	144	47	+97	100	Promoted to the Premier Division South
2	Hilltop (P)	40	26	6	8	113	59	+54	84 (Note: Hilltop were promoted to Premier Division North in July 2022 after the withdrawal of Staines Town.)	Qualification for the play-offs
3	Wallingford Town (O, P)	40	22	13	5	102	73	+29	79	Qualification for the play-offs
4	Rayners Lane	40	24	6	10	115	64	+51	78	Qualification for the play-offs
5	Eversley & California	40	24	3	13	82	52	+30	75	Qualification for the play-offs
6	Kensington & Ealing Borough	40	23	6	11	81	53	+28	75	
7	FC Deportivo Galicia	40	21	9	10	134	85	+49	72	
8	Sandhurst Town	40	21	6	13	87	54	+33	69	
9	Berks County	40	19	5	16	99	85	+14	62	
10	A.F.C. Hayes	40	16	7	17	73	70	+3	55	
11	Bedfont & Feltham	40	14	10	16	73	64	+9	52	
12	Langley	40	14	9	17	74	78	−4	51	
13	British Airways	39	12	11	16	75	76	−1	47 (Note: The match between British Airways and AFC Aldermaston remained unplayed at the end of the season.)	
14	A.F.C. Aldermaston	39	13	5	21	61	111	−50	44	
15	Enfield Borough	40	12	5	23	78	93	−15	41	Transferred to the Eastern Counties League
16	Woodley United	40	13	2	25	53	113	−60	41	
17	London Samurai Rovers	40	11	5	24	70	111	−41	38	
18	Bagshot	40	10	7	23	50	94	−44	37	
19	Hillingdon Borough	40	9	7	24	57	82	−25	34	Reprieved from relegation (Note: All third-from-bottom sides at Step 6 were reprieved from relegation, and a number of second-from-bottom sides, including Cove, were reprieved on a PPG (points per game) basis.)
20	Cove	40	8	6	26	57	137	−80	30	Reprieved from relegation
21	Chalvey Sports (R)	40	6	6	28	49	126	−77	24 (Note: Chalvey Sports elected not to seek a reprieve from relegation from the FA, despite an opportunity to do so.)	Relegated to a feeder league

Source: CCL Div One Table
Rules for classification: 1) points; 2) goal difference; 3) number of goals scored.
(C) Champions; (O) Play-off winners; (P) Promoted; (R) Relegated

=== Promotion playoffs ===
Semi-finals
2	Hilltop	5
5	Eversley & California	1
3	Wallingford Town	2
4	Rayners Lane	0

Final
2	Hilltop	(1) 1
3	Wallingford Town (a.e.t)	(1) 2

==== Semifinals ====
3 May 2022	Wallingford Town	2–0	Rayners Lane	Wallingford
				Stadium: Hithercroft

4 May 2022	Hilltop	5–1	Eversley & California	Hendon
				Stadium: Silver Jubilee Park

==== Final ====
7 May 2022	Hilltop	1–2 (a.e.t.)	Wallingford Town	Hendon
				Stadium: Silver Jubilee Park

=== Stadia and locations ===
Location of the clubs in the 2021–22 Combined Counties League Division One (Berkshire)
Location of the clubs in the 2021–22 Combined Counties League Division One (Greater London)

Club	Location	Stadium	Capacity
A.F.C. Aldermaston	Thatcham	Waterside Park (Note: Groundshare with Thatcham Town)	1,500
A.F.C. Hayes	Hayes	Farm Park	2,000
Bagshot	Camberley	Krooner Park (Note: Groundshare with Camberley Town)	1,976
Bedfont & Feltham	Bedfont	The Orchard	1,200
Berks County	Binfield	Hill Farm Lane (Note: Groundshare with Binfield)	4,000
British Airways	Bedfont	The Orchard (Note: Groundshare with Bedfont & Feltham)	1,200
Chalvey Sports	Burnham	The 1878 Stadium (Note: Groundshare with Burnham)	2,500
Cove	Cove	Oak Farm	2,500
Enfield Borough	Finchley	The Maurice Rebak Stadium (Note: Groundshare with Wingate & Finchley)	1,500
Eversley & California	Eversley	Fox Lane	1,000
FC Deportivo Galicia	Bedfont	Bedfont Recreation Ground (Note: Groundshare with Bedfont Sports)	3,000
Hillingdon Borough	Ruislip	Middlesex Stadium	3,587
Hilltop	Ruislip	Middlesex Stadium (Note: Groundshare with Hillingdon Borough)	3,587
Kensington & Ealing Borough	Perivale	Reynolds Field (Note: Groundshare with Hanwell Town)	3,000
Langley	Slough	Arbour Park (Note: Groundshare with Slough Town)	2,000
London Lions	Arkley	Rowley Lane	1,500
London Samurai Rovers	Hanworth	Rectory Meadow (Note: Groundshare with Hanworth Villa)	1,000
Rayners Lane	Rayners Lane	The Tithe Farm Social Club	1,000
Sandhurst Town	Sandhurst	Bottom Meadow	1,950
Wallingford Town	Wallingford	Hithercroft	1,500
Woodley United	Tilehurst, Reading	Rivermoor Stadium (Note: Groundshare with Reading City)	2,000
