= 2020–21 Southern Football League =

The 2020–21 Southern Football League season was the 118th in the history of the Southern League since its establishment in 1894. The league has two Premier divisions (Central and South) at Step 3 of the National League System (NLS) and two Division One divisions (Central and South) at Step 4. These correspond to levels 7 and 8 of the English football league system.

The allocations for Steps 3 and 4 for season 2020–21 were announced by the FA on 21 July 2020.

Due to the restrictions on clubs' ability to play matches in the lockdowns associated with the COVID-19 pandemic, competitions at Steps 3–6 were curtailed on 24 February 2021. The scheduled restructuring of non-league took place at the end of the season, with a new division to be added to Northern Premier League at step 4 for 2021–22, which resulted in some reallocations into or out of, and promotions to, the Southern League's Step 4 divisions.

== Premier Division Central ==
Southern Football League Premier Division Central
- Season: 2020–21
- Champions: Coalville Town

The Premier Division Central comprised the same set of 22 teams which competed in the aborted competition the previous season.

=== League table ===
Pos	Team	Pld	W	D	L	GF	GA	GD	Pts	Qualification
1	Coalville Town (C)	7	5	2	0	21	5	+16	17	
2	Needham Market	7	5	2	0	17	7	+10	17	
3	Stratford Town	8	5	0	3	17	16	+1	15	
4	Rushall Olympic	8	3	4	1	14	12	+2	13	
5	Tamworth	7	3	3	1	13	8	+5	12	
6	Redditch United	8	3	3	2	14	11	+3	12	
7	Stourbridge	8	2	5	1	10	7	+3	11	
8	Royston Town	8	2	5	1	12	11	+1	11	
9	Kings Langley	9	2	5	2	11	11	0	11	Transferred to Premier Division South
10	Hitchin Town	7	3	1	3	12	14	−2	10	
11	St Ives Town	6	3	1	2	11	13	−2	10	
12	Peterborough Sports	6	2	3	1	10	5	+5	9	
13	AFC Rushden & Diamonds	7	2	3	2	14	11	+3	9	
14	Lowestoft Town	7	2	3	2	8	9	−1	9	
15	Nuneaton Borough	8	2	2	4	14	13	+1	8	
16	Biggleswade Town	8	2	2	4	13	17	−4	8	
17	Alvechurch	9	2	2	5	12	16	−4	8	
18	Banbury United	7	2	2	3	9	13	−4	8	
19	Bromsgrove Sporting	8	2	2	4	9	17	−8	8	
20	Hednesford Town	8	2	1	5	12	16	−4	7	
21	Leiston	8	1	2	5	11	21	−10	5	
22	Barwell	7	1	1	5	6	17	−11	4	

Source: Southern League website, Non League Matters
Rules for classification: 1) points; 2) goal difference; 3) number of goals scored; 4) number of matches won; 5) head-to-head results
(C) Champions

=== Results ===
Home \ Away	ALV	BAN	BAR	BIG	BRO	COA	HED	HIT	KLL	LEI	LOW	NEE	NUN	PSP	RED	ROY	RUD	RUS	STI	STO	STR	TAM
Alvechurch	—											1–2	0–2			2–2					1–3	1–0
Banbury United		—					2–0					1–1			0–1							
Barwell	0–5		—								1–2		2–1					1–3				
Biggleswade Town	2–1			—	0–1					7–4												
Bromsgrove Sporting					—	1–1		0–2									1–0					2–2
Coalville Town		6–1				—				4–1					1–1		4–1					
Hednesford Town					5–1	0–3	—													1–4	4–2	
Hitchin Town	5–1							—		2–2						0–2						
Kings Langley		2–1							—		1–1		3–2						2–2			
Leiston									1–0	—				1–4			2–2	0–1				
Lowestoft Town							0–0				—			1–0				1–1			2–3	
Needham Market					3–0						3–1	—				3–1					4–2	
Nuneaton Borough		1–2											—				1–1		6–2			
Peterborough Sports			3–0						1–1					—								1–1
Redditch United				4–1								1–1	2–0		—			3–3				
Royston Town		2–2		1–1			2–1									—				1–1		
AFC Rushden & Diamonds			1–1				2–1	7–1									—					
Rushall Olympic					4–3	0–2			1–1					1–1				—				
St Ives Town				1–0						1–0					3–1				—			
Stourbridge	0–0			2–2				1–0	0–0				1–1							—		
Stratford Town								1–2	2–1						2–1					2–1	—	
Tamworth			2–1	3–0												1–1			4–2			—

Updated to match(es) played on 3 November 2020. Source: Southern League
Legend: Blue = home team win; Yellow = draw; Red = away team win.

=== Stadia and locations ===
Locations of the Premier Division Central clubs

Club	Location	Stadium	Capacity
AFC Rushden & Diamonds	Rushden	Hayden Road	2,000
Alvechurch	Alvechurch	Lye Meadow	3,000
Banbury United	Banbury	Spencer Stadium	2,000
Barwell	Barwell	Kirkby Road	2,500
Biggleswade Town	Biggleswade	Langford Road	3,000
Bromsgrove Sporting	Bromsgrove	Victoria Ground	4,893
Coalville Town	Coalville	Owen Street Sports Ground	2,000
Hednesford Town	Hednesford	Keys Park	6,039
Hitchin Town	Hitchin	Top Field	4,554
Kings Langley	Kings Langley	Sadiku Stadium	1,963
Leiston	Leiston	Victory Road	2,250
Lowestoft Town	Lowestoft	Crown Meadow	3,000
Needham Market	Needham Market	Bloomfields	4,000
Nuneaton Borough	Nuneaton	Liberty Way	4,614
Peterborough Sports	Peterborough	Lincoln Road	2,300
Redditch United	Redditch	The Valley	5,000
Royston Town	Royston	Garden Walk	5,000
Rushall Olympic	Walsall (Rushall)	Dales Lane	2,000
St Ives Town	St Ives	Westwood Road	2,000
Stourbridge	Stourbridge	War Memorial Athletic Ground	2,626
Stratford Town	Stratford-upon-Avon	Knights Lane	2,000
Tamworth	Tamworth	The Lamb Ground	4,565

== Premier Division South ==
Southern Football League Premier Division South
- Season: 2020–21
- Champions: Tiverton Town

The Premier Division South comprised 20 teams, two fewer than the previous season, following Blackfield & Langley's resignation and voluntary relegation to the Wessex League, and Merthyr Town's decision to withdraw for one season due to the effects of the COVID-19 pandemic in Wales.

=== League table ===
Pos	Team	Pld	W	D	L	GF	GA	GD	Pts
1	Tiverton Town (C)	7	6	0	1	21	4	+17	18
2	Poole Town	7	5	2	0	16	7	+9	17
3	Salisbury	7	5	1	1	17	7	+10	16
4	Truro City	8	5	1	2	17	9	+8	16
5	Metropolitan Police	8	4	2	2	14	11	+3	14
6	Swindon Supermarine	7	4	0	3	12	10	+2	12
7	Chesham United	7	3	3	1	6	4	+2	12
8	Taunton Town	6	3	2	1	8	5	+3	11
9	Hendon	8	3	2	3	12	10	+2	11
10	Hayes & Yeading United	7	2	4	1	11	8	+3	10
11	Gosport Borough	7	2	2	3	11	9	+2	8
12	Walton Casuals	6	2	1	3	8	13	−5	7
13	Wimborne Town	6	2	1	3	5	12	−7	7
14	Hartley Wintney	6	1	3	2	5	9	−4	6
15	Weston-super-Mare	6	1	2	3	8	10	−2	5
16	Harrow Borough	7	1	2	4	11	14	−3	5
17	Yate Town	8	1	2	5	8	17	−9	5
18	Farnborough	8	1	1	6	7	16	−9	4
19	Dorchester Town	7	1	1	5	5	17	−12	4
20	Beaconsfield Town	7	0	2	5	4	14	−10	2

Source: Southern League website, Non League Matters
Rules for classification: 1) points; 2) goal difference; 3) number of goals scored; 4) number of matches won; 5) head-to-head results
(C) Champions

=== Results ===
Home \ Away	BEA	CHE	DOR	FAR	GOS	HAB	HAR	HAY	HEN	MET	POO	SAL	SWI	TAU	TIV	TRU	WAL	WES	WIM	YAT
Beaconsfield Town	—				0–2	1–4		0–0			2–2									
Chesham United		—			0–0		0–0						0–1							
Dorchester Town			—									1–6			1–0			1–3	0–0	
Farnborough	4–1			—									1–3	0–1						0–0
Gosport Borough				4–0	—	2–2											2–3			
Harrow Borough		1–2				—						1–2						1–1		
Hartley Wintney	2–1						—					0–2								3–1
Hayes & Yeading United		2–2						—					3–1	1–1		3–1				
Hendon				2–0			4–0	1–1	—							0–4				
Metropolitan Police					3–1	5–2			1–0	—										1–1
Poole Town					1–0			2–1	1–0		—					2–1				
Salisbury	1–0								2–4		2–2	—						2–1		
Swindon Supermarine			2–0							2–1			—		1–2	2–3				
Taunton Town			2–1							1–2				—			2–0			
Tiverton Town				3–1											—		5–0	3–1	5–0	
Truro City						1–0								1–1		—			4–1	2–0
Walton Casuals							1–1		1–3	3–0							—			
Weston-super-Mare										1–1								—	1–2	
Wimborne Town		0–1		2–1															—	
Yate Town		0–1	4–1								2–6				0–3					—

Updated to match(es) played on 3 November 2020. Source: Southern League
Legend: Blue = home team win; Yellow = draw; Red = away team win.

=== Stadia and locations ===
Locations of the Premier Division South clubs
Greater London and environ Premier Division South clubs

Club	Location	Stadium	Capacity
Beaconsfield Town	Beaconsfield	Holloways Park	3,500
Chesham United	Chesham	The Meadow	5,000
Dorchester Town	Dorchester	The Avenue Stadium	5,000
Farnborough	Farnborough	Cherrywood Road	7,000
Gosport Borough	Gosport	Privett Park	4,500
Harrow Borough	Harrow	Earlsmead Stadium	3,000
Hartley Wintney	Hartley Wintney	The Memorial Playing Fields	2,000
Hayes & Yeading United	Hayes, Hillingdon	SkyEx Community Stadium	3,000
Hendon	Hendon	Silver Jubilee Park	2,000
Metropolitan Police	East Molesey	Imber Court	3,000
Poole Town	Poole	The BlackGold Stadium	2,500
Salisbury	Salisbury	Raymond McEnhill Stadium	5,000
Swindon Supermarine	Swindon (South Marston)	Hunts Copse Ground	3,000
Taunton Town	Taunton	Wordsworth Drive	2,500
Tiverton Town	Tiverton	Ladysmead	3,500
Truro City	Truro	Treyew Road	3,200
Walton Casuals	Walton-on-Thames	Elmbridge Xcel Sports Hub	2,500
Weston-super-Mare	Weston-super-Mare	Woodspring Stadium	3,500
Wimborne Town	Wimborne Minster	The Cuthbury	3,000
Yate Town	Yate	Lodge Road	2,000

== Division One Central ==
Southern Football League Division One Central
- Season: 2020–21
- Champions: Corby Town

Division One Central comprised the same set of 20 teams which competed in the aborted competition the previous season.

=== League table ===
Pos	Team	Pld	W	D	L	GF	GA	GD	Pts	Qualification
1	Corby Town (C)	7	5	0	2	15	8	+7	15	Transferred to Northern Premier League Division One Midlands
2	Bedworth United	8	4	3	1	16	15	+1	15	Transferred to Northern Premier League Division One Midlands
3	St Neots Town	8	3	4	1	23	12	+11	13	
4	Aylesbury United	7	4	1	2	16	11	+5	13	
5	Bedford Town	7	3	3	1	9	6	+3	12	
6	Daventry Town	8	4	0	4	13	15	−2	12	Transferred to Northern Premier League Division One Midlands
7	Halesowen Town	7	3	2	2	20	10	+10	11	Transferred to Northern Premier League Division One Midlands
8	Berkhamsted	6	3	2	1	13	5	+8	11	
9	Barton Rovers	8	3	2	3	16	13	+3	11	
10	AFC Dunstable	7	3	2	2	10	9	+1	11	
11	Welwyn Garden City	6	3	1	2	10	8	+2	10	
12	Kidlington	6	2	3	1	10	6	+4	9	
13	Coleshill Town	8	3	0	5	7	11	−4	9	Transferred to Northern Premier League Division One Midlands
14	Wantage Town	8	3	0	5	13	20	−7	9	
15	Yaxley	6	2	2	2	13	14	−1	8	Transferred to Northern Premier League Division One Midlands
16	Thame United	7	2	1	4	12	10	+2	7	
17	Kempston Rovers	8	1	3	4	11	18	−7	6	
18	Biggleswade	7	2	0	5	7	16	−9	6	
19	North Leigh	7	1	3	3	5	17	−12	6	
20	Didcot Town	8	2	0	6	7	22	−15	6	

Source: Southern League website, Non League Matters
Rules for classification: 1) points; 2) goal difference; 3) number of goals scored; 4) number of matches won; 5) head-to-head results
(C) Champions

=== Results ===
Home \ Away	AYU	BAR	BDT	BDW	BER	BIG	COL	COR	DAV	DID	DUN	HAL	KEM	KID	NOR	STN	THM	WAN	WGC	YAX
Aylesbury United	—		0–0						3–2									4–2		
Barton Rovers		—					1–0	1–2					3–0			1–2				
Bedford Town		1–1	—		1–1										4–1					
Bedworth United		4–3		—							1–1						3–2		3–2	
Berkhamsted	3–2				—		0–1								1–1			5–0		
Biggleswade	3–2		0–2			—					2–0			1–3						
Coleshill Town	1–4					2–0	—	0–1										2–0		
Corby Town	0–1			4–0				—	4–1			4–3								
Daventry Town		3–5							—	3–0			2–1	1–0						
Didcot Town					0–3					—			4–1	0–3			2–1			
AFC Dunstable								2–0		1–0	—	3–1				2–2				
Halesowen Town		1–1							2–0			—			5–0					7–1
Kempston Rovers									0–1				—	2–2				3–2		3–3
Kidlington				1–1								1–1		—						
North Leigh							1–0								—	2–2	0–0			
St Neots Town				1–1		4–1				8–0						—			2–3	
Thame United			3–0				4–1										—		0–1	
Wantage Town				1–3							3–1						3–2	—	2–0	
Welwyn Garden City						3–0							1–1						—	
Yaxley			0–1							2–1					5–0	2–2				—

Updated to match(es) played on 4 November 2020. Source: Southern League
Legend: Blue = home team win; Yellow = draw; Red = away team win.

=== Stadia and locations ===
Locations of Division One Central clubs

Club	Location	Stadium	Capacity
AFC Dunstable	Dunstable	Creasey Park	3,200
Aylesbury United	Aylesbury	The Meadow (groundshare with Chesham United)	5,000
Barton Rovers	Barton-le-Clay	Sharpenhoe Road	4,000
Bedford Town	Bedford	The Eyrie	3,000
Bedworth United	Bedworth	The Oval	3,000
Berkhamsted	Berkhamsted	Broadwater	2,500
Biggleswade	Biggleswade	Langford Road (groundshare with Biggleswade Town)	3,000
Coleshill Town	Coleshill	Pack Meadow	2,070
Corby Town	Corby	Steel Park	3,893
Daventry Town	Daventry	Communications Park	3,000
Didcot Town	Didcot	Loop Meadow	3,000
Halesowen Town	Halesowen	The Grove	3,150
Kempston Rovers	Kempston	Hillgrounds Leisure	2,000
Kidlington	Kidlington	Yarnton Road	1,500
North Leigh	North Leigh	Eynsham Hall Park Sports Ground	2,000
St Neots Town	St Neots	New Rowley Park	3,500
Thame United	Thame	Meadow View Park	2,000
Wantage Town	Wantage	Alfredian Park	1,500
Welwyn Garden City	Welwyn Garden City	Herns Way	1,000
Yaxley	Yaxley	Leading Drove	1,500

== Division One South ==
Southern Football League Division One South
- Season: 2020–21
- Champions: Cirencester Town

Division One South comprised the same set of 20 teams which competed in the aborted competition the previous season.

=== League table ===
Pos	Team	Pld	W	D	L	GF	GA	GD	Pts	Qualification or relegation
1	Cirencester Town (C)	9	8	0	1	26	4	+22	24	
2	AFC Totton	9	6	2	1	22	8	+14	20	
3	Basingstoke Town	7	5	1	1	23	13	+10	16	Transferred to Isthmian League South Central Division
4	Winchester City	7	5	0	2	14	8	+6	15	
5	Slimbridge	9	4	2	3	22	21	+1	14	
6	Paulton Rovers	9	4	1	4	15	14	+1	13	
7	Willand Rovers	8	4	1	3	14	13	+1	13	
8	Highworth Town	8	4	1	3	11	14	−3	13	
9	Frome Town	7	3	2	2	12	7	+5	11	
10	Larkhall Athletic	7	3	1	3	11	11	0	10	
11	Bristol Manor Farm	7	3	1	3	12	14	−2	10	
12	Sholing	5	3	0	2	9	6	+3	9	
13	Evesham United	6	2	2	2	5	7	−2	8	
14	Cinderford Town	7	2	1	4	10	21	−11	7	
15	Thatcham Town	8	1	3	4	8	13	−5	6	Transferred to Isthmian League South Central Division
16	Bideford	6	0	4	2	7	9	−2	4	
17	Moneyfields	4	1	0	3	7	7	0	3	Demoted voluntary to the Wessex League
18	Melksham Town	6	1	0	5	5	14	−9	3	
19	Barnstaple Town	6	0	2	4	9	22	−13	2	
20	Mangotsfield United	7	0	0	7	4	20	−16	0	

Source: Southern League website, Non League Matters
Rules for classification: 1) points; 2) goal difference; 3) number of goals scored; 4) number of matches won; 5) head-to-head results
(C) Champions

=== Results ===
Home \ Away	TOT	BAR	BAS	BID	BMF	CIN	CIR	EVE	FRO	HWT	LAR	MAN	MEL	MON	PAU	SHO	SLI	THT	WIL	WIN
AFC Totton	—	3–0		1–1	3–0															1–2
Barnstaple Town		—	2–2			2–3													2–8	
Basingstoke Town	2–3		—									3–0				2–1				
Bideford				—					0–1								2–2	2–2		
Bristol Manor Farm		2–2			—		0–2			3–2										
Cinderford Town			3–6			—								2–1	0–5					1–2
Cirencester Town						4–0	—									0–2		2–0	3–0	
Evesham United						1–1		—			0–1					0–3				
Frome Town	1–1						1–2	2–2	—	5–0										
Highworth Town										—					2–1		2–2			1–0
Larkhall Athletic	1–3		1–2								—	3–0								
Mangotsfield United							0–3		0–1			—					2–3		1–2	
Melksham Town							0–4			0–1			—							1–2
Moneyfields													0–2	—	1–2					
Paulton Rovers				1–0			1–6	0–1			2–3				—		3–1			
Sholing										3–2						—	0–2			
Slimbridge		4–1	3–6									1–3	4–2				—			
Thatcham Town	1–2				1–2								3–0	1–5	0–0			—		
Willand Rovers	0–5								2–1		2–0							0–0	—	
Winchester City					3–2			0–1				5–1								—

Updated to match(es) played on 4 November 2020. Source: Southern League
Legend: Blue = home team win; Yellow = draw; Red = away team win.

=== Stadia and locations ===
Locations of Division One South clubs

Club	Location	Stadium	Capacity
AFC Totton	Totton	Testwood Stadium	3,000
Barnstaple Town	Barnstaple	Mill Road	5,000
Basingstoke Town	Basingstoke	The City Ground (groundshare with Winchester City)	4,500
Bideford	Bideford	The Sports Ground	2,000
Bristol Manor Farm	Bristol (Sea Mills)	The Creek	2,000
Cinderford Town	Cinderford	Causeway Ground	3,500
Cirencester Town	Cirencester	Corinium Stadium	4,500
Evesham United	Evesham	Jubilee Stadium	3,000
Frome Town	Frome	Badgers Hill	2,000
Highworth Town	Highworth	The Elms Recreation Ground	2,000
Larkhall Athletic	Bath (Larkhall)	The Plain Ham Ground	1,000
Mangotsfield United	Mangotsfield	Cossham Street	2,500
Melksham Town	Melksham	Oakfield Stadium	2,500
Moneyfields	Portsmouth	Moneyfields Sports Ground	2,000
Paulton Rovers	Paulton	Athletic Field	2,500
Sholing	Sholing	Universal Stadium	1,000
Slimbridge	Slimbridge	Thornhill Park	1,500
Thatcham Town	Thatcham	Waterside Park	1,500
Willand Rovers	Willand	The Stan Robinson Stadium	1,000
Winchester City	Winchester	The City Ground	4,500

== See also ==
- Southern Football League
- 2020–21 Isthmian League
- 2020–21 Northern Premier League
