= 2022–23 Combined Counties Football League =

Combined Counties Football League
- Season: 2022–23

The 2022–23 Combined Counties Football League season (known as the 2022–23 Cherry Red Records Combined Counties Football League for sponsorship reasons) was the 45th in the history of the Combined Counties Football League, a football competition in England. Teams were divided into three divisions; the Premier North, the Premier South and the First.

The constitution was announced on 12 May 2022.

== Premier Division North ==
Premier Division North consisted of 20 clubs, increased from 18 last season, after Hanworth Villa and Southall were promoted to the Isthmian League South Central Division; Abbey Rangers and Tadley Calleva were transferred to Premier Division South; St Panteleimon were transferred to the Spartan South Midlands League Premier Division, and CB Hounslow United were relegated to Division One. Eight new clubs joined the division:

- Four transferred from the Spartan South Midlands League Premier Division:
  - Broadfields United
  - Flackwell Heath
  - Harefield United
  - Oxhey Jets
- Three promoted from Division One:
  - London Lions
  - Hilltop, promoted in July 2022 after the withdrawal of Staines Town
  - Wallingford & Crowmarsh, who changed their name from Wallingford Town
- One relegated from the Isthmian League South Central Division:
  - Chalfont St Peter
- One other club renamed:
  - Edgware Town to Edgware & Kingsbury
- Staines Town were initially relegated from the Isthmian League South Central Division, but suspended operations, withdrew from the league, and in July 2022 were replaced by Hilltop.

=== League table ===
Pos	Team	Pld	W	D	L	GF	GA	GD	Pts	Promotion, qualification or relegation
1	Ascot United (C, P)	38	33	3	2	99	30	+69	102	Promoted to the Isthmian League
2	Egham Town	38	26	6	6	96	39	+57	84	Qualified for an inter-step play-off
3	Reading City	38	23	7	8	78	40	+38	76	
4	Burnham	38	22	6	10	84	54	+30	72	
5	Flackwell Heath	38	21	7	10	68	45	+23	70	
6	Edgware & Kingsbury	38	20	3	15	70	63	+7	63	
7	Virginia Water	38	19	5	14	66	51	+15	62	
8	North Greenford United	38	17	7	14	80	67	+13	58	
9	Wembley	38	16	4	18	60	67	−7	52	
10	Wallingford & Crowmarsh	38	14	9	15	61	68	−7	51	
11	London Lions	38	13	8	17	64	72	−8	44 (Note: London Lions had three points deducted for fielding an ineligible player.)	Transferred to the Spartan South Midlands League
12	Broadfields United	38	13	5	20	56	72	−16	44 (Note: The match between Hilltop and Broadfields United on 26 November 2022 was awarded to Broadfields as an away walkover.)	
13	Hilltop	38	13	5	20	60	78	−18	44	
14	Harefield United	38	13	4	21	71	78	−7	43	
15	Spelthorne Sports	38	11	9	18	56	66	−10	42	Transferred to Premier Division South
16	Holyport	38	11	8	19	59	77	−18	41 (Note: The match between Holyport and London Lions on 1 May 2023 was awarded to Holyport as a home walkover.)	
17	Wokingham & Emmbrook	38	9	7	22	38	70	−32	34	
18	Chalfont St Peter	38	9	7	22	40	77	−37	34	
19	Windsor (R)	38	9	5	24	51	94	−43	29 (Note: Windsor had three points deducted for fielding an ineligible player.)	Relegated to Division One
20	Oxhey Jets (R)	38	8	5	25	41	90	−49	29	Relegated to Division One

Source: CCL Prem Div Table
Rules for classification: 1) points; 2) goal difference; 3) number of goals scored.
(C) Champions; (P) Promoted; (R) Relegated

=== Inter-step play-off ===
29 April 2023	Merstham	3–1	Egham Town	Merstham
15:00	Goode 43'; Adam 64', 82'		Muhemba 17'	Stadium: Moatside; Attendance: 652; Referee: Will Briers

=== Stadia and locations ===
Location of the clubs in the 2022–23 Combined Counties League Premier Division North (Berkshire, Buckinghamshire, and Oxfordshire)
Location of the clubs in the 2022–23 Combined Counties League Premier Division North (Greater London)

Club	Location	Stadium	Capacity
Ascot United	Ascot	Ascot Racecourse	1,150
Broadfields United	Harrow	Tithe Farm Sports & Social Club (Note: Groundshare with Rayners Lane)	1,000
Burnham	Burnham	The 1878 Stadium	2,500
Chalfont St Peter	Chalfont St Peter	Mill Meadow	1,500
Edgware & Kingsbury	Kingsbury	Silver Jubilee Park (Note: Groundshare with Hendon)	1,990
Egham Town	Egham	Runnymede Stadium	5,500
Flackwell Heath	Flackwell Heath	Wilks Park	2,000
Harefield United	Harefield	Preston Park	1,200
Hilltop	Ruislip	Middlesex Stadium (Note: Groundshare with Hillingdon Borough)	3,587
Holyport	Maidenhead	Summerleaze Village	1,000
London Lions	Arkley	Rowley Lane	1,500
North Greenford United	Greenford	Berkeley Fields	2,000
Oxhey Jets	South Oxhey	The Boundary Stadium	2,000
Reading City	Reading	Rivermoor Stadium	2,000
Spelthorne Sports	Ashford	Spelthorne Sports Club	1,000
Virginia Water	Windsor	Stag Meadow (Note: Groundshare with Windsor)	4,500
Wallingford & Crowmarsh	Wallingford	Hithercroft	1,500
Wembley	Wembley	Vale Farm	2,450
Windsor	Windsor	Stag Meadow	4,500
Wokingham & Emmbrook	Wokingham	Lowther Road	1,000

== Premier Division South ==
Premier Division South remained at 20 clubs after Beckenham Town were promoted to the Isthmian League South East Division, Walton & Hersham were promoted to the Isthmian League South Central Division, and Molesey were relegated to Division One. Three new clubs joined the division:

- One transferred from the Wessex League Premier Division:
  - Alton
- Two transferred from Premier Division North:
  - Abbey Rangers
  - Tadley Calleva
- The club finishing the season in second position was initially required to play in an inter-step playoff with a team from step 4. Due to ground grading failures higher up the pyramid, three step 4 clubs were reprieved, and the three step 5 runners-up with the highest PPG (points per game) were automatically promoted. Badshot Lea were one of those three.

=== League table ===
Pos	Team	Pld	W	D	L	GF	GA	GD	Pts	Promotion, qualification or relegation
1	Raynes Park Vale (C, P)	38	32	3	3	100	29	+71	99	Promoted to the Isthmian League South Central Division
2	Badshot Lea (P)	38	30	4	4	105	29	+76	94	Promoted to the Isthmian League South Central Division
3	Jersey Bulls	38	24	7	7	90	29	+61	79	
4	Abbey Rangers	38	21	6	11	88	51	+37	69	
5	Colliers Wood United	38	21	4	13	76	53	+23	67 (Note: The match between Colliers Wood United and Jersey Bulls on 27 April 2023 was awarded to Colliers Wood as a home walkover.)	
6	Farnham Town	38	19	8	11	82	54	+28	65	
7	Knaphill	38	19	8	11	62	40	+22	65	
8	Tadley Calleva	38	18	7	13	63	61	+2	61	
9	Balham	38	14	11	13	63	59	+4	53	
10	Camberley Town	38	15	7	16	61	61	0	52	
11	Cobham	38	15	4	19	49	56	−7	49	
12	Redhill	38	15	4	19	59	89	−30	49	
13	Alton	38	12	9	17	57	71	−14	45	
14	Guildford City	38	12	6	20	56	74	−18	42	
15	AFC Croydon Athletic	38	12	4	22	55	78	−23	40	
16	Sheerwater	38	11	5	22	51	97	−46	38	
17	Horley Town	38	11	4	23	52	65	−13	37	
18	Fleet Town	38	9	8	21	46	77	−31	35	
19	Banstead Athletic (R)	38	9	4	25	38	74	−36	31	Relegated to Southern Combination League Division One
20	Frimley Green (R)	38	3	3	32	30	136	−106	12	Relegated to Wessex League Division One

Source: CCL Prem Div Table
Rules for classification: 1) points; 2) goal difference; 3) number of goals scored.
(C) Champions; (P) Promoted; (R) Relegated

=== Stadia and locations ===
Map showing the location of teams in Division 2
Location of the clubs in the 2022–23 Combined Counties League Premier Division South (Surrey)
Location of the clubs in the 2022–23 Combined Counties League Premier Division South (Hampshire)
Location of the clubs in the 2022–23 Combined Counties League Premier Division South (Channel Islands)

Club	Location	Stadium	Capacity
Abbey Rangers	Addlestone	Addlestone Moor	1,000
AFC Croydon Athletic	Thornton Heath	Mayfield Stadium	3,000
Alton	Alton	Anstey Park	2,000
Badshot Lea	Wrecclesham	Westfield Lane	1,200
Balham	Thornton Heath	Mayfield Stadium (Note: Groundshare with AFC Croydon Athletic)	3,000
Banstead Athletic	Tadworth	Merland Rise	1,500
Camberley Town	Camberley	Krooner Park	1,976
Cobham	Cobham	Leg O'Mutton Field	2,000
Colliers Wood United	Wimbledon	Wibbandune Sports Ground	2,000
Farnham Town	Farnham	Memorial Ground	1,500
Fleet Town	Fleet	Calthorpe Park	2,000
Frimley Green	Frimley Green	Recreation Ground	2,000
Guildford City	Guildford	Spectrum Football Ground	1,320
Horley Town	Horley	The New Defence	1,800
Jersey Bulls	Saint Helier	Springfield Stadium	2,000
Knaphill	Knaphill	Redding Way	1,000
Raynes Park Vale	Raynes Park	Prince George's Playing Fields	1,500
Redhill	Redhill	Kiln Brow	2,000
Sheerwater	Sheerwater	Eastwood Centre	600
Tadley Calleva	Tadley	Barlows Park	1,000

== Division One ==
Division One remained at 21 clubs after London Lions, Hilltop and Wallingford Town were promoted to the Premier Division North; Enfield Borough were transferred to the Eastern Counties League Division One South, and Chalvey Sports were relegated. Five new clubs joined the division:

- One relegated from Premier Division North:
  - CB Hounslow United
- One relegated from Premier Division South:
  - Molesey
- One promoted from the Surrey Premier County League:
  - Spartans Youth
- One transferred from the Southern Counties East League Division One:
  - Westside
- One transferred from the Spartan South Midlands League Division One:
  - Penn & Tylers Green
- A.F.C. Hayes reverted to their previous name of Brook House F.C.
- Bedfont & Feltham changed their name to Bedfont F.C.
- Kensington & Ealing Borough changed their name to Rising Ballers Kensington F.C.

Initially, Holmer Green were transferred from the Spartan South Midlands League Premier Division, but this was later reversed.

=== League table ===
Pos	Team	Pld	W	D	L	GF	GA	GD	Pts	Promotion, qualification or relegation
1	Sandhurst Town (C, P)	40	28	3	9	128	53	+75	87 (Note: The match between Sandhurst Town and Bagshot on 4 April 2023 was awarded to Sandhurst as a home walkover.)	Promoted to the Premier Division South
2	Berks County	40	26	5	9	115	56	+59	83	Qualification for the play-offs
3	London Samurai Rovers	40	25	3	12	109	56	+53	78	Qualification for the play-offs
4	Rayners Lane (O, P)	40	23	4	13	100	60	+40	73	Promoted to the Premier Division North
5	Langley	40	22	7	11	107	71	+36	73	Qualification for the play-offs
6	FC Deportivo Galicia	40	21	10	9	94	72	+22	73 (Note: The match between Bedfont and FC Deportivo Galicia on 7 January 2023 was awarded to Deportivo Galicia as an away walkover.)	
7	British Airways	40	22	4	14	91	68	+23	70	
8	Bedfont	40	20	7	13	94	59	+35	67	
9	Eversley & California	40	19	8	13	83	60	+23	65	
10	Westside	40	19	7	14	83	58	+25	64	
11	Rising Ballers Kensington	39	18	10	11	80	57	+23	64 (Note: The match between Rising Ballers Kensington and Molesey on 2 May 2023 was not played.)	
12	Penn & Tylers Green	40	18	4	18	57	66	−9	58 (Note: The match between AFC Aldermaston and Penn & Tylers Green on 24 April 2023 was awarded to Penn & Tylers Green as an away walkover.)	
13	Woodley United	40	16	6	18	66	70	−4	54 (Note: The match between Woodley United and AFC Aldermaston on 25 April 2023 was awarded to Woodley as a home walkover.)	
14	Molesey	39	15	7	17	72	63	+9	52	
15	Hillingdon Borough	40	15	2	23	67	112	−45	47	
16	Cove	40	11	7	22	67	110	−43	40	Transferred to the Wessex League
17	Spartans Youth	40	9	8	23	44	88	−44	35 (Note: The match between Spartans Youth and Molesey on 2 May 2023 was awarded to Spartans Youth as a home walkover.)	
18	Brook House	40	9	4	27	57	112	−55	31	
19	A.F.C. Aldermaston	40	9	3	28	45	112	−67	30 (Note: The match between AFC Aldermaston and Rayners Lane on 15 March 2023 was awarded to Aldermaston as a home walkover.)	Reprieved and transferred to the Wessex League
20	Bagshot	40	8	5	27	57	135	−78	29	Reprieved from relegation
21	CB Hounslow United (R)	40	7	4	29	41	119	−78	25	Relegated to the Surrey Premier County Football League

Source: CCL Div One Table
Rules for classification: 1) points; 2) goal difference; 3) number of goals scored.
(C) Champions; (O) Play-off winners; (P) Promoted; (R) Relegated

=== Promotion play-offs ===
Semi-finals
2	Berks County	1
5	Langley	7
3	London Samurai Rovers	2
4	Rayners Lane	3

Final
4	Rayners Lane	2
5	Langley	0

==== Semifinals ====
3 May 2023	London Samurai Rovers	2–3	Rayners Lane	Rayners Lane
				Stadium: The Tithe Farm Social Club; Attendance: 150

4 May 2023	Berks County	1–7	Langley	Sandhurst
				Stadium: Bottom Meadow

==== Final ====
8 May 2023	Rayners Lane	2–0	Langley	Rayners Lane
				Stadium: The Tithe Farm Social Club

=== Stadia and locations ===
Location of the clubs in the 2022–23 Combined Counties League Division One (Berkshire and Buckinghamshire)
Location of the clubs in the 2022–23 Combined Counties League Division One (Greater London)

Club	Location	Stadium	Capacity
A.F.C. Aldermaston	Thatcham	Waterside Park (Note: Groundshare with Thatcham Town)	1,500
Bagshot	Camberley	Krooner Park (Note: Groundshare with Camberley Town)	1,976
Bedfont	Bedfont	The Orchard	1,200
Berks County	Binfield	Hill Farm Lane (Note: Groundshare with Binfield)	4,000
British Airways	Bedfont	The Orchard (Note: Groundshare with Bedfont)	1,200
Brook House	Hayes	Farm Park	2,000
CB Hounslow United	Hounslow	Green Lane	2,100
Cove	Cove	Oak Farm	2,500
Eversley & California	Eversley	Fox Lane	1,000
FC Deportivo Galicia	Bedfont	Bedfont Recreation Ground (Note: Groundshare with Bedfont Sports)	3,000
Hillingdon Borough	Ruislip	Middlesex Stadium	3,587
Langley	Slough	Arbour Park (Note: Groundshare with Slough Town)	2,000
London Samurai Rovers	Hanworth	Rectory Meadow (Note: Groundshare with Hanworth Villa)	1,000
Molesey	West Molesey	Walton Road	4,000
Penn & Tylers Green	Penn	French School Meadow	900
Rayners Lane	Rayners Lane	The Tithe Farm Social Club	1,000
Rising Ballers Kensington	Greenford	Berkeley Fields (Note: Groundshare with North Greenford United)	2,000
Sandhurst Town	Sandhurst	Bottom Meadow	1,950
Spartans Youth	Northwood	Northwood Park (Note: Groundshare with Northwood)	3,075
Westside	Wimbledon	Wibbandune Sports Ground (Note: Groundshare with Colliers Wood United)	2,000
Woodley United	Tilehurst, Reading	Rivermoor Stadium (Note: Groundshare with Reading City)	2,000
