= 2020–21 Spartan South Midlands Football League =

The 2020–21 season was the 24th in the history of Spartan South Midlands Football League, a football competition in England. The league operates three divisions, two of which are in covered in this article, the Premier Division, at Step 5 and Division 1 at Step 6 of the English football league system.

The allocations for Steps 5 and 6 for season 2020–21 were announced by the FA on 21 July, and were subject to appeal.

The 2020–21 season started in September and was suspended in December a result of the COVID-19 pandemic in England. The league season was subsequently abandoned on 24 February 2021.

The scheduled restructure of non-League took place at the end of the season, with new divisions added to the Combined Counties and United Counties Leagues at Step 5 for 2021-22. Promotions from Steps 5 to 4 and 6 to 5 were based on points per game across all matches over the two cancelled seasons (2019–20 and 2020–21), while teams were promoted to Step 6 on the basis of a subjective application process.

== Premier Division ==
Spartan South Midlands Football League Premier Division
- Season: 2020–21
- Promoted: Colney Heath
- Matches: 124
- Goals: 496 (4 per match)

The Premier Division comprised the same set of 21 teams which competed in the aborted competition the previous season.

=== League table ===
Pos	Team	Pld	W	D	L	GF	GA	GD	Pts	Promotion or qualification
1	Biggleswade United	14	9	1	4	48	34	+14	28	Transferred to the United Counties League
2	Oxhey Jets	12	7	4	1	39	16	+23	25	
3	Eynesbury Rovers	12	8	1	3	35	18	+17	25	Transferred to the United Counties League
4	Colney Heath	12	7	4	1	24	15	+9	25	Promoted to the Southern League (Note: Promoted based on points per game calculations from 2019–20 and 2020–21 seasons combined.)
5	Potton United	13	7	2	4	29	22	+7	23	Transferred to the United Counties League
6	Newport Pagnell Town	13	6	4	3	34	21	+13	22	Transferred to the United Counties League
7	Leighton Town	10	7	1	2	24	11	+13	22	
8	Harpenden Town	11	7	1	3	28	20	+8	22	
9	Harefield United	12	7	0	5	23	24	−1	21	
10	Baldock Town	12	6	1	5	21	18	+3	19	
11	Aylesbury Vale Dynamos	10	6	1	3	22	20	+2	19	
12	Crawley Green	14	5	2	7	28	35	−7	17	
13	Leverstock Green	11	5	1	5	19	17	+2	16	
14	Dunstable Town	13	4	4	5	23	31	−8	16	
15	Arlesey Town	10	4	0	6	14	20	−6	12	
16	Edgware Town	10	3	1	6	19	29	−10	10	Transferred to the Combined Counties League
17	Tring Athletic	15	3	0	12	20	37	−17	9	
18	North Greenford United	10	2	2	6	13	20	−7	8	Transferred to the Combined Counties League
19	Broadfields United	11	2	1	8	11	19	−8	7	
20	Wembley	12	1	2	9	9	29	−20	5	Transferred to the Combined Counties League
21	London Colney	11	1	1	9	13	40	−27	4	

Source: FA Full Time
Rules for classification: 1) Points; 2) Goal difference; 3) Number of goals scored; 4) Number of matches won; 5) Head-to-head results

== Division One ==
Spartan South Midlands Football League Division One
- Season: 2020–21
- Promoted: Milton Keynes Irish; New Salamis; St Panteleimon
- Matches: 79
- Goals: 318 (4.03 per match)

Division One comprised 17 teams, two less than the previous season, after FC Broxbourne Borough resigned from the league and Brimsdown were relocated to the Eastern Counties League. Also, Hackney Wick were initially relocated from the Eastern Counties League, but this relocation was reversed.

=== League table ===
Pos	Team	Pld	W	D	L	GF	GA	GD	Pts	Promotion or qualification
1	Shefford Town & Campton	11	8	1	2	29	11	+18	25	
2	Milton Keynes Irish	9	7	1	1	32	11	+21	22	Promoted to the Premier Division (Note: Promoted based on points per game calculations from 2019–20 and 2020–21 seasons combined.)
3	London Lions	9	7	1	1	18	7	+11	22	Transferred to the Combined Counties League
4	St Panteleimon	10	7	0	3	31	15	+16	21	Promoted to the Combined Counties League (Note: Promoted based on points per game calculations from 2019–20 and 2020–21 seasons combined.)
5	Buckingham Athletic	11	5	2	4	24	14	+10	17	
6	Ampthill Town	9	5	2	2	21	17	+4	17	
7	Stotfold	10	5	1	4	23	17	+6	16	
8	Bedford	9	4	4	1	16	13	+3	16	
9	Rayners Lane	11	5	1	5	19	21	−2	16	Transferred to the Combined Counties League
10	New Salamis	8	3	4	1	23	9	+14	13	Promoted to the Premier Division
11	Winslow United	9	4	1	4	19	17	+2	13	
12	Langford	12	3	1	8	17	32	−15	10	
13	Enfield Borough	6	2	0	4	19	19	0	6	Transferred to the Combined Counties League
14	Park View	9	2	0	7	9	25	−16	6	Transferred to the Eastern Counties League
15	Amersham Town	8	1	1	6	6	16	−10	4	
16	Hillingdon Borough	8	1	0	7	4	37	−33	3	
17	London Tigers	9	0	0	9	8	37	−29	0	Transferred to the Combined Counties League

Source: FA Full-Time
Rules for classification: 1) Points; 2) Goal difference; 3) Number of goals scored; 4) Number of matches won; 5) Head-to-head results

== Division Two ==
Spartan South Midlands Football League Division Two
- Season: 2020–21
- Matches: 45
- Goals: 193 (4.29 per match)

Division Two featured 14 clubs which competed in the division last season, along with one new club:

- Berkhamsted Comrades

=== League table ===
Pos	Team	Pld	W	D	L	GF	GA	GD	Pts	Promotion
1	Old Bradwell United	8	5	2	1	22	7	+15	17	
2	Pitstone & Ivinghoe	5	5	0	0	14	4	+10	15	
3	Codicote	7	4	1	2	19	11	+8	13	
4	MK Gallacticos	7	4	0	3	12	12	0	12	Resigned from the league
5	Berkhamsted Raiders	6	3	1	2	18	14	+4	10	
6	Berkhamsted Comrades	7	3	1	3	14	10	+4	10	
7	New Bradwell St Peter	7	3	0	4	16	12	+4	9	
8	Bovingdon	5	3	0	2	13	9	+4	9	
9	Buckingham United	5	2	1	2	15	9	+6	7	
10	Totternhoe	4	2	1	1	8	6	+2	7	
11	Aston Clinton	6	2	1	3	14	14	0	7	
12	Sarratt	5	2	0	3	11	16	−5	6	
13	Tring Corinthians	7	1	2	4	10	15	−5	5	
14	Mursley United	6	1	0	5	4	25	−21	3	Resigned from the league
15	The 61	5	0	0	5	3	29	−26	0	

Source: FA Full-Time
Rules for classification: 1) points; 2) goal difference; 3) number of goals scored.
