= 2021–22 Southern Football League =

League season

The 2021–22 Southern Football League season was the 119th in the history of the Southern League since its establishment in 1894. The league had two Premier divisions (Central and South) at Step 3 of the National League System (NLS) and two Division One divisions (Central and South) at Step 4. These correspond to levels 7 and 8 of the English football league system.

The allocations for Step 4 this season were announced by The Football Association (FA) on 17 May 2021.

The scheduled restructuring of the non-League system took place at the end of the 2020–21 season and a new division was added to the Northern Premier League at Step 4 for 2021–22, which resulted in some reallocations into or out of, and promotions to, the Southern League's Step 4 divisions.

== Premier Division Central ==
Southern Football League Premier Division Central
- Season: 2021–22
- Champions: Banbury United
- Promoted: Banbury United; Peterborough Sports
- Relegated: Biggleswade United; Lowestoft Town
- Matches: 420
- Goals: 1,271 (3.03 per match)
- Highest attendance: 1,835; Banbury United 1–1 Tamworth (2 April 2022)
- Total attendance: 178,706
- Average attendance: 425 (+18.4% to previous full season)

After Kings Langley were transferred to the Premier Division South, The Premier Division Central consisted of 21 clubs, all from the previous aborted season.

=== League table ===
Pos	Team	Pld	W	D	L	GF	GA	GD	Pts	Promotion, qualification or relegation
1	Banbury United (C, P)	40	32	6	2	92	32	+60	102	Promoted to the National League North
2	Peterborough Sports (O, P)	40	24	7	9	94	46	+48	79	Qualified for the play-offs (Note: Four teams play for one spot and promotion to Step 2.)
3	Coalville Town	40	23	9	8	86	47	+39	78	Qualified for the play-offs
4	Rushall Olympic	40	20	9	11	80	54	+26	69	Qualified for the play-offs
5	Alvechurch	40	18	11	11	57	41	+16	65	Qualified for the play-offs
6	AFC Rushden & Diamonds	40	19	8	13	57	49	+8	65	
7	Leiston	40	18	6	16	59	65	−6	60	
8	Royston Town	40	17	8	15	65	51	+14	59	
9	Hednesford Town	40	14	12	14	66	64	+2	54	
10	Tamworth	40	14	12	14	58	58	0	54	
11	Stourbridge	40	15	8	17	61	71	−10	53	
12	Needham Market	40	12	13	15	66	69	−3	49	
13	Stratford Town	40	13	8	19	48	70	−22	47	
14	St Ives Town	40	13	8	19	57	90	−33	47	
15	Redditch United	40	11	12	17	38	50	−12	45	
16	Nuneaton Borough	40	11	10	19	51	62	−11	42 (Note: Nuneaton Borough were deducted one point for fielding an ineligible player.)	
17	Hitchin Town	40	11	9	20	47	58	−11	42	
18	Bromsgrove Sporting	40	10	12	18	36	59	−23	42	Reprieve from relegation (Note: Seven clubs at Step 3, all four fourth-from-bottom teams and three that are placed third-from-bottom and has the most points per game (PPG), were reprieved.)
19	Barwell	40	10	11	19	57	78	−21	41	Reprieve from relegation
20	Biggleswade Town (R)	40	7	13	20	47	64	−17	34	Relegated to Division One Central
21	Lowestoft Town (R)	40	9	6	25	49	93	−44	33	Relegated to Isthmian League North Division

Source: Southern League, Non League Matters
Rules for classification: 1) points; 2) goal difference; 3) number of goals scored; 4) number of matches won; 5) head-to-head results
(C) Champions; (O) Play-off winners; (P) Promoted; (R) Relegated

==== Play-offs ====
Semi-finals
2	Peterborough Sports	2
5	Alvechurch	1
3	Coalville Town	3
4	Rushall Olympic	0

Final
2	Peterborough Sports	2
3	Coalville Town	0

Semi-finals

26 April 2022	Peterborough Sports	2–1	Alvechurch	Bee Arena, Peterborough
19:45 (UTC+01:00)	Fryatt 46'; McCammon 53'		Clayton-Phillips 69'	Attendance: 741

26 April 2022	Coalville Town	3–0	Rushall Olympic	Mander Cruickshank Solicitors Stadium, Coalville
19:45 (UTC+01:00)	Putman 10'; Waite 18' (pen.); Waite 84'			Attendance: 1,223

Final

2 May 2022	Peterborough Sports	2–0	Coalville Town	Bee Arena, Peterborough
15:00 (UTC+01:00)	Jones 10'; McCammon 58'			Attendance: 1,895

=== Results ===
Home \ Away	RUD	ALV	BAN	BAR	BIG	BRO	COA	HED	HIT	LEI	LOW	NEE	NUN	PSP	RED	ROY	RUS	STI	STO	STR	TAM
AFC Rushden & Diamonds	—	1–2	0–2	0–1	0–0	2–1	2–1	1–0	2–1	3–3	3–1	2–0	0–1	0–1	1–0	1–3	1–1	4–0	2–0	1–3	2–2
Alvechurch	1–2	—	0–2	2–1	1–0	3–0	1–1	0–1	0–0	2–0	2–0	2–3	0–2	3–1	1–0	3–1	3–1	1–1	5–1	2–1	2–1
Banbury United	2–0	2–1	—	3–2	4–0	1–1	3–1	2–1	3–1	3–2	3–0	3–3	1–0	2–1	1–2	2–0	1–0	5–1	1–1	1–0	1–1
Barwell	1–2	1–1	2–6	—	1–0	2–3	1–0	3–4	2–1	2–0	1–4	2–3	2–2	2–2	1–1	2–1	0–0	4–5	0–1	4–0	0–1
Biggleswade Town	0–0	1–1	0–2	7–0	—	0–0	2–2	0–2	0–0	3–2	2–1	5–1	1–1	0–3	0–0	1–2	0–1	3–2	1–3	7–1	2–2
Bromsgrove Sporting	2–1	0–2	1–3	2–0	0–1	—	0–1	2–1	1–0	0–4	3–1	1–0	0–1	0–4	1–0	1–2	2–4	1–0	0–2	1–1	1–1
Coalville Town	2–2	3–1	1–1	1–1	1–0	4–0	—	0–0	2–1	4–1	2–3	2–0	4–1	6–2	2–0	2–3	3–0	3–0	3–0	3–1	4–0
Hednesford Town	2–3	1–4	2–3	1–1	1–1	2–2	0–2	—	2–2	4–0	2–0	2–1	3–2	3–0	2–2	0–2	2–2	2–1	3–1	1–2	2–3
Hitchin Town	1–2	0–1	0–2	3–2	1–0	1–0	0–2	1–2	—	4–1	3–2	1–6	2–1	2–2	1–1	0–2	2–0	4–0	0–3	0–1	1–1
Leiston	2–1	1–1	0–2	2–1	1–0	1–0	0–3	2–1	2–1	—	4–2	1–0	1–0	0–0	1–2	1–1	2–4	3–1	2–1	1–1	1–1
Lowestoft Town	2–3	3–2	1–3	0–3	1–1	2–1	1–2	0–1	2–2	3–5	—	0–1	0–3	2–1	0–0	1–0	2–3	2–2	2–0	2–0	1–1
Needham Market	2–2	1–1	1–4	2–2	3–0	0–1	0–1	3–3	3–1	3–0	4–0	—	1–2	1–1	1–1	2–2	1–2	1–1	1–3	4–1	1–0
Nuneaton Borough	0–1	2–2	0–0	0–2	3–3	1–1	2–3	1–1	2–1	2–0	2–0	1–2	—	1–4	0–1	0–2	0–0	1–2	1–1	0–0	2–0
Peterborough Sports	2–1	0–1	2–3	3–1	3–0	2–2	2–0	4–1	1–0	1–2	5–0	3–0	4–0	—	0–1	3–0	2–0	2–0	8–4	1–1	2–0
Redditch United	1–3	1–0	0–2	1–1	1–0	1–1	1–4	1–1	2–1	0–1	4–2	0–0	1–3	0–1	—	2–3	1–1	1–0	2–0	3–0	0–2
Royston Town	1–2	0–0	1–3	2–2	3–0	0–0	2–2	2–0	0–1	1–2	4–0	3–3	2–0	1–2	1–0	—	2–3	1–1	1–2	3–0	3–0
Rushall Olympic	2–0	3–1	1–2	2–0	4–1	4–1	5–1	1–1	2–2	0–3	3–1	4–1	2–1	1–4	2–2	0–1	—	3–1	4–0	4–1	1–2
St Ives Town	1–0	1–0	2–1	1–3	2–1	2–2	2–3	2–4	1–0	2–1	2–2	1–1	3–2	2–7	2–1	1–7	3–2	—	1–4	0–4	1–2
Stourbridge	1–1	0–1	0–2	1–1	2–0	1–1	4–3	1–2	0–4	2–0	3–0	1–1	2–6	1–1	4–0	1–0	1–1	1–3	—	4–2	4–0
Stratford Town	1–2	0–0	0–1	2–0	3–3	0–0	1–1	1–0	0–1	2–1	1–2	2–3	4–2	2–5	2–1	3–0	0–3	0–3	1–0	—	1–0
Tamworth	0–1	1–1	0–4	6–0	3–1	1–0	1–1	3–3	0–0	1–3	6–1	5–2	3–0	0–2	1–0	2–0	0–4	1–1	4–0	0–2	—

Source: Southern League
Legend: Blue = home team win; Yellow = draw; Red = away team win.

=== Stadia and locations ===
Locations of the Premier Division Central clubs

Club	Location	Stadium	Capacity
AFC Rushden & Diamonds	Rushden	Hayden Road	2,000
Alvechurch	Alvechurch	Lye Meadow	3,000
Banbury United	Banbury	Spencer Stadium	2,000
Barwell	Barwell	Kirkby Road	2,500
Biggleswade Town	Biggleswade	Langford Road	3,000
Bromsgrove Sporting	Bromsgrove	Victoria Ground	4,893
Coalville Town	Coalville	Owen Street Sports Ground	2,000
Hednesford Town	Hednesford	Keys Park	6,039
Hitchin Town	Hitchin	Top Field	4,554
Leiston	Leiston	Victory Road	2,250
Lowestoft Town	Lowestoft	Crown Meadow	3,000
Needham Market	Needham Market	Bloomfields	4,000
Nuneaton Borough	Nuneaton	Liberty Way	4,614
Peterborough Sports	Peterborough	Lincoln Road	2,300
Redditch United	Redditch	The Valley	5,000
Royston Town	Royston	Garden Walk	5,000
Rushall Olympic	Walsall (Rushall)	Dales Lane	2,000
St Ives Town	St Ives	Westwood Road	2,000
Stourbridge	Stourbridge	War Memorial Athletic Ground	2,626
Stratford Town	Stratford-upon-Avon	Knights Lane	2,000
Tamworth	Tamworth	The Lamb Ground	4,565

== Premier Division South ==
Southern Football League Premier Division South
- Season: 2021–22
- Champions: Taunton Town
- Promoted: Taunton Town; Farnborough
- Relegated: Wimborne Town
- Matches: 462
- Goals: 1,391 (3.01 per match)
- Highest attendance: 2,303; Taunton Town 2–1 Farnborough (23 April 2022)
- Total attendance: 162,690
- Average attendance: 352 (+4.1% to previous full season)

The Premier Division consisted of 22 clubs: 20 clubs from the previous season, and two new clubs:

- Kings Langley, transferred from the Premier Division Central
- Merthyr Town, returned after one-season absence

=== League table ===
Pos	Team	Pld	W	D	L	GF	GA	GD	Pts	Promotion, qualification or relegation
1	Taunton Town (C, P)	42	28	7	7	83	42	+41	91	Promoted to the National League South
2	Hayes & Yeading United	42	26	8	8	100	39	+61	86	Qualified for the play-offs (Note: Four teams play for one spot and promotion to Step 2.)
3	Farnborough (O, P)	42	26	7	9	73	44	+29	85	Qualified for the play-offs
4	Metropolitan Police	42	24	9	9	72	46	+26	81	Qualified for the play-offs
5	Weston-super-Mare	42	23	9	10	72	41	+31	78	Qualified for the play-offs
6	Chesham United	42	22	11	9	80	50	+30	77	
7	Yate Town	42	21	9	12	66	48	+18	72	
8	Truro City	42	20	10	12	62	54	+8	70	
9	Gosport Borough	42	19	9	14	65	56	+9	66	
10	Poole Town	42	19	7	16	74	69	+5	64	
11	Walton Casuals	42	16	10	16	53	61	−8	58	Club folded
12	Swindon Supermarine	42	16	9	17	63	63	0	57	
13	Tiverton Town	42	15	8	19	61	63	−2	53	
14	Harrow Borough	42	15	7	20	62	77	−15	52	
15	Salisbury	42	13	9	20	49	75	−26	48	
16	Hendon	42	14	5	23	58	70	−12	47	
17	Beaconsfield Town	42	13	7	22	70	92	−22	46	
18	Hartley Wintney	42	13	5	24	56	75	−19	44	
19	Dorchester Town	42	12	5	25	41	58	−17	41	Reprieved from relegation (Note: Seven clubs at Step 3, all four fourth-from-bottom teams and three that are placed third-from-bottom and has the most points per game (PPG), were reprieved.)
20	Kings Langley	42	9	10	23	49	68	−19	37	Reprieved from relegation, then transferred to the Premier Division Central
21	Merthyr Town	42	6	8	28	47	94	−47	26	Reprieved from relegation (Note: Merthyr Town were reprieved from relegation following the withdrawal of Walton Casuals from the Southern League in June 2022.)
22	Wimborne Town (R)	42	4	7	31	35	106	−71	19	Relegated to Division One South

Source: Southern League, Non League Matters
Rules for classification: 1) points; 2) goal difference; 3) number of goals scored; 4) number of matches won; 5) head-to-head results
(C) Champions; (O) Play-off winners; (P) Promoted; (R) Relegated

==== Play-offs ====
Semi-finals
2	Hayes & Yeading United	2
5	Weston-Super-Mare	1
3	Farnborough	2
4	Metropolitan Police	1

Final
2	Hayes & Yeading United	1
3	Farnborough	2

Semi-finals

26 April 2022	Hayes & Yeading United	2–1	Weston-Super-Mare	Skyex Community Stadium, London
19:45 (UTC+01:00)	Rowe 19'; Emmanuel 58'		King 88'	Attendance: 607

26 April 2022	Farnborough	2–1	Metropolitan Police	Easy as HGV Stadium, Farnborough
19:45 (UTC+01:00)	Fearn 90'; Parker 96'		Alves 85'	Attendance: 947

Final

2 May 2022	Hayes & Yeading United	1–2	Farnborough	Skyex Community Stadium, London
15:00 (UTC+01:00)	Emmanuel 13'		Parker 45'; Deering 86'	Attendance: 1,600

=== Results ===
Home \ Away	BEA	CHE	DOR	FAR	GOS	HAB	HAR	HAY	HEN	KLL	MER	MET	POO	SAL	SWI	TAU	TIV	TRU	WAL	WES	WIM	YAT
Beaconsfield Town	—	2–2	2–0	1–2	7–2	6–1	1–0	0–2	2–2	1–0	3–4	2–2	2–1	3–3	5–1	0–1	3–5	1–2	2–4	1–2	2–2	0–4
Chesham United	2–2	—	5–1	1–3	4–2	0–0	4–2	2–1	2–0	1–1	3–1	4–1	3–2	4–0	1–1	1–1	4–1	3–1	2–1	1–1	5–0	1–0
Dorchester Town	1–2	1–2	—	1–2	0–2	3–1	3–2	0–1	3–0	2–0	1–3	0–1	1–4	0–1	2–1	0–1	1–1	1–1	2–0	0–1	3–0	0–1
Farnborough	2–0	1–0	1–0	—	3–1	1–3	2–0	0–0	3–0	4–1	3–2	1–2	2–0	2–1	2–0	3–2	2–0	2–0	0–0	1–1	4–1	1–2
Gosport Borough	2–1	3–0	1–1	1–0	—	3–1	1–3	0–1	1–1	1–1	5–0	1–2	4–3	1–0	1–3	0–1	3–2	1–1	1–0	1–3	2–0	2–1
Harrow Borough	3–1	0–4	2–0	1–2	1–0	—	2–1	0–1	2–2	0–1	1–1	1–4	0–4	0–0	2–2	3–2	3–2	6–3	0–0	1–0	2–0	1–2
Hartley Wintney	1–4	0–1	1–0	0–1	0–1	0–3	—	2–2	2–1	2–1	1–0	1–0	2–1	2–3	1–0	1–2	0–1	4–1	2–1	1–2	2–0	2–2
Hayes & Yeading United	2–1	2–0	3–0	4–2	1–1	4–2	6–1	—	2–1	1–0	3–0	1–2	6–1	2–0	3–0	2–1	2–3	1–0	0–1	1–2	8–1	4–0
Hendon	2–0	0–3	1–3	0–1	0–1	1–0	2–1	2–6	—	0–2	6–0	3–0	3–2	2–3	1–0	2–0	1–2	0–2	3–1	0–2	3–1	1–2
Kings Langley	0–1	2–2	1–2	1–1	0–0	0–2	5–0	2–1	4–2	—	1–1	2–3	3–0	1–2	1–2	1–1	3–3	0–1	0–1	0–1	4–0	0–1
Merthyr Town	4–0	0–3	1–1	2–3	1–2	1–2	2–2	0–5	0–2	0–1	—	2–3	0–3	5–0	1–3	0–3	1–2	1–3	0–2	1–3	2–0	0–3
Metropolitan Police	4–1	2–0	2–0	1–2	3–3	1–1	3–2	1–1	1–0	1–0	1–2	—	1–1	0–0	3–1	1–2	1–0	0–0	0–2	3–0	2–2	1–0
Poole Town	2–0	0–0	1–0	1–3	2–1	3–0	2–1	1–4	2–1	6–2	2–0	5–2	—	2–2	2–1	2–2	2–1	1–4	1–0	0–3	3–1	0–2
Salisbury	1–2	1–2	0–1	1–0	0–5	2–1	2–2	1–1	0–2	0–2	2–0	1–3	1–1	—	4–2	1–2	0–3	1–3	2–1	0–0	0–2	1–1
Swindon Supermarine	2–2	2–1	1–0	5–2	0–0	2–4	3–2	0–4	1–1	3–0	2–0	1–1	0–1	2–1	—	0–1	2–0	0–1	6–1	2–1	3–1	1–3
Taunton Town	7–1	3–1	2–1	2–1	2–1	7–1	2–1	1–1	3–1	2–1	2–1	0–1	1–1	3–1	2–0	—	3–1	2–1	3–0	3–2	3–1	2–1
Tiverton Town	5–1	0–0	2–3	2–0	2–2	2–1	0–2	0–0	1–0	4–1	2–2	0–1	1–0	1–2	1–1	0–1	—	2–1	1–2	1–2	1–0	0–1
Truro City	0–1	4–1	1–0	2–2	1–2	2–1	0–0	2–1	0–4	0–0	3–1	1–0	3–0	1–3	1–1	1–0	2–0	—	2–0	0–4	2–1	0–0
Walton Casuals	3–0	0–1	1–1	0–0	1–0	2–1	4–3	3–2	2–1	4–0	1–1	0–5	2–4	2–0	1–1	1–1	3–2	1–1	—	1–0	2–2	0–3
Weston-super-Mare	2–1	3–1	1–0	2–2	0–1	2–1	1–3	1–1	6–0	3–0	3–1	0–1	0–0	1–3	1–0	2–0	2–2	2–2	2–1	—	2–0	1–2
Wimborne Town	1–3	1–2	0–1	0–2	2–1	1–4	1–0	1–4	1–4	3–3	1–1	0–2	2–4	0–1	1–2	1–4	1–0	3–4	0–0	0–4	—	0–5
Yate Town	4–0	1–1	2–1	0–2	1–2	2–1	2–1	1–3	0–0	3–1	2–2	0–4	2–1	5–2	0–3	0–0	1–2	0–2	3–1	1–1	0–0	—

Source: Southern League
Legend: Blue = home team win; Yellow = draw; Red = away team win.

=== Stadia and locations ===
Locations of the Premier Division South clubs
Greater London and environ Premier Division South clubs

Club	Location	Stadium	Capacity
Beaconsfield Town	Beaconsfield	Holloways Park	3,500
Chesham United	Chesham	The Meadow	5,000
Dorchester Town	Dorchester	The Avenue Stadium	5,000
Farnborough	Farnborough	Cherrywood Road	7,000
Gosport Borough	Gosport	Privett Park	4,500
Harrow Borough	Harrow	Earlsmead Stadium	3,000
Hartley Wintney	Hartley Wintney	The Memorial Playing Fields	2,000
Hayes & Yeading United	Hayes, Hillingdon	SkyEx Community Stadium	3,000
Hendon	Hendon	Silver Jubilee Park	2,000
Kings Langley	Kings Langley	Sadiku Stadium	1,963
Merthyr Town	Merthyr Tydfil	Penydarren Park	4,000
Metropolitan Police	East Molesey	Imber Court	3,000
Poole Town	Poole	Tatnam Ground	2,500
Salisbury	Salisbury	Raymond McEnhill Stadium	5,000
Swindon Supermarine	Swindon (South Marston)	Hunts Copse Ground	3,000
Taunton Town	Taunton	Wordsworth Drive	2,500
Tiverton Town	Tiverton	Ladysmead	3,500
Truro City	Plymouth	Bolitho Park (groundshare with Plymouth Parkway)	3,500
Walton Casuals	Walton-on-Thames	Elmbridge Sports Hub	2,500
Weston-super-Mare	Weston-super-Mare	Woodspring Stadium	3,500
Wimborne Town	Wimborne Minster	The Cuthbury	3,000
Yate Town	Yate	Lodge Road	2,000

== Division One Central ==
Southern Football League Division One Central
- Season: 2021–22
- Champions: Bedford Town
- Promoted: Bedford Town; North Leigh
- Relegated: Colney Heath; Wantage Town
- Matches: 380
- Goals: 1,244 (3.27 per match)
- Highest attendance: 1,254; Bedford Town 2–0 Berkhamsted (29 January 2022)
- Total attendance: 68,899
- Average attendance: 181 (-4.2% to previous full season)

Division One Central consisted of 20 clubs: 14 clubs from the previous season, and six new clubs.

- Clubs, transferred from Isthmian League South Central Division:
  - FC Romania
  - Harlow Town
  - Hertford Town
  - Waltham Abbey
  - Ware
- Plus:
  - Colney Heath, promoted from the Spartan South Midlands League

=== League table ===
Pos	Team	Pld	W	D	L	GF	GA	GD	Pts	Promotion, qualification or relegation
1	Bedford Town (C, P)	38	28	7	3	100	28	+72	91	Promoted to the Premier Division Central
2	Berkhamsted	38	24	9	5	64	29	+35	81	Qualified for the play-offs (Note: Four teams play for one spot and promotion to Step 3.)
3	AFC Dunstable	38	21	10	7	64	33	+31	73	Qualified for the play-offs
4	Ware	38	21	8	9	90	47	+43	71	Qualified for the play-offs
5	Welwyn Garden City	38	21	8	9	80	48	+32	71	(Note: Welwyn Garden City were initially relegated for failing Step 4 ground grading standards. Although this relegation was rescinded on appeal, Welwyn were still excluded from the promotion play-offs.)
6	North Leigh (O, P)	38	19	11	8	69	42	+27	68	Qualified for the play-offs
7	Harlow Town	38	17	10	11	71	49	+22	61	
8	Thame United	38	16	12	10	64	45	+19	60	
9	Biggleswade	38	18	6	14	62	56	+6	60	
10	St Neots Town	38	14	11	13	57	53	+4	53	Transferred to the Northern Premier League Division One Midlands
11	Waltham Abbey	38	15	7	16	64	64	0	52	
12	FC Romania	38	15	3	20	71	83	−12	48	
13	Didcot Town	38	13	8	17	50	69	−19	47	
14	Aylesbury United	38	12	7	19	64	70	−6	43	
15	Barton Rovers	38	11	8	19	47	63	−16	41	
16	Hertford Town	38	10	6	22	58	82	−24	36	
17	Kidlington	38	8	11	19	47	86	−39	35	Reprieved from the inter-step play-off (Note: Ten of the 16 clubs at Step 4, all eight fourth-from-bottom teams and two clubs placed third-from-bottom, one at the top and the other in third place on a points per game (PPG) basis, were reprieved from contesting relegation play-offs.)
18	Kempston Rovers (O)	38	8	5	25	50	102	−52	29	Qualified for the inter-step play-off (Note: Contested a one-off play-off match as one of the remaining six third-from-bottom teams against one of the six runners-up from Step 5 that had the fewest PPG at the end of the 2021–22 season. The winner remained at Step 4 for the 2022–23 season and the loser at Step 5.)
19	Colney Heath (R)	38	7	2	29	35	92	−57	23	Relegated to the Spartan South Midlands League
20	Wantage Town (R)	38	5	5	28	37	103	−66	20	Relegated to the Hellenic League

Source: Southern League, Non League Matters
Rules for classification: 1) points; 2) goal difference; 3) number of goals scored; 4) number of matches won; 5) head-to-head results
(C) Champions; (O) Play-off winners; (P) Promoted; (R) Relegated

==== Play-offs ====
Semi-finals
2	Berkhamsted	1
6	North Leigh	2
3	AFC Dunstable	0 (3)
4	Ware	0 (4)

Final
4	Ware	2
6	North Leigh	4

Semi-finals

26 April 2022	Berkhamsted	1–2 (a.e.t.)	North Leigh	Broadwater, Berkhamsted
19:45 (UTC+01:00)	Walster 90+2'		Steele 58'; Gunn 96'	Attendance: 523

26 April 2022	AFC Dunstable	0–0 (a.e.t.) (3–4 p)	Ware	Creasy Park, Dunstable
19:45 (UTC+01:00)				Attendance: 374

Final

2 May 2022	Ware	2–4	North Leigh	Wodson Park, Ware
15:00 (UTC+01:00)	Adu-Donyinah 84'; Dulson 88'		Nash 41'; McCreadie 50'; Louis 90+5'; Williams 90+6'	Attendance: 1,564

==== Inter-step play-off ====
30 April 2022	Kempston Rovers	2–2 (a.e.t.) (5–4 p)	Eccleshill United	Causeway Ground, Cinderford
15:00 (UTC+01:00)	Hayford 37'; Baker 68'		Bradley 50'; Cissa 56'	Attendance: 184

=== Results ===
Home \ Away	DUN	AYU	BAR	BDT	BER	BIG	COL	DID	ROM	HAR	HER	KEM	KID	NOR	STN	THM	WAL	WAN	WAR	WGC
AFC Dunstable	—	1–2	1–0	1–0	3–0	3–2	2–0	1–2	5–1	2–0	2–2	4–1	2–0	2–2	1–1	1–1	1–0	3–0	0–2	2–1
Aylesbury United	1–1	—	1–1	1–1	0–1	0–4	2–0	0–2	4–0	2–1	2–0	3–1	3–0	1–3	1–2	0–1	1–2	0–1	2–1	3–4
Barton Rovers	0–2	1–1	—	0–2	0–3	0–1	3–0	0–1	0–3	0–2	0–1	2–1	0–3	1–2	2–0	0–0	1–1	3–1	2–1	2–5
Bedford Town	2–0	2–1	2–1	—	2–0	2–1	3–0	4–0	5–1	4–0	3–2	5–1	3–0	0–0	1–0	3–0	2–2	8–1	2–3	1–0
Berkhamsted	1–1	3–1	2–2	1–0	—	2–0	1–0	2–0	4–2	2–3	2–0	2–0	4–0	1–1	0–1	2–1	1–0	5–0	0–1	2–1
Biggleswade	0–3	0–0	2–1	1–1	0–3	—	0–0	1–2	3–0	2–1	4–1	3–1	1–0	1–2	1–2	0–3	2–1	1–2	3–0	2–1
Colney Heath	0–1	3–1	1–2	0–3	0–1	2–3	—	2–3	1–2	1–3	2–0	3–1	2–3	3–2	1–0	0–0	0–3	1–2	0–5	0–2
Didcot Town	1–0	3–3	4–0	0–3	0–2	0–4	0–1	—	2–4	1–3	2–0	2–2	0–3	1–4	2–2	0–2	1–2	1–0	3–1	2–3
FC Romania	1–2	3–1	1–4	0–1	1–1	0–2	6–1	1–2	—	1–3	5–4	3–1	2–0	0–1	1–2	0–4	2–1	3–2	1–0	2–3
Harlow Town	1–1	1–1	2–0	1–2	0–1	4–1	3–0	1–1	1–1	—	2–1	1–3	4–2	0–0	1–1	2–2	3–2	7–0	2–3	3–2
Hertford Town	0–2	2–1	2–3	0–3	1–2	1–3	3–2	5–0	0–4	0–4	—	1–2	1–4	0–4	4–1	1–1	2–1	2–1	1–2	3–1
Kempston Rovers	1–2	2–3	1–1	0–5	1–3	1–1	6–1	2–0	1–6	0–6	4–3	—	3–1	1–1	0–3	1–2	1–2	2–0	0–5	0–2
Kidlington	1–1	2–5	3–1	1–1	1–1	2–3	1–0	1–1	4–3	0–0	2–5	1–1	—	1–1	1–1	0–1	0–3	3–2	2–2	1–7
North Leigh	1–2	4–2	1–2	1–4	0–1	3–2	6–1	3–0	2–1	0–0	0–3	1–0	7–0	—	2–0	3–1	0–3	2–0	0–0	1–1
St Neots Town	0–4	3–2	6–2	1–1	1–1	0–0	6–1	0–4	1–2	1–1	1–1	2–3	4–0	0–1	—	1–0	0–0	2–1	3–4	0–2
Thame United	1–1	1–3	0–3	2–2	1–2	1–3	5–2	1–1	5–0	3–1	2–2	4–0	3–1	2–2	2–0	—	1–1	1–0	0–1	3–0
Waltham Abbey	0–2	4–3	1–5	2–5	0–1	3–0	3–1	3–3	3–1	2–1	3–0	4–2	0–0	1–2	1–3	0–3	—	1–0	1–3	1–1
Wantage Town	0–0	1–5	1–1	0–7	1–1	1–3	0–1	0–1	3–5	0–1	3–3	3–0	2–1	2–4	1–2	1–3	1–3	—	0–3	1–2
Ware	3–2	5–2	1–0	2–3	3–3	2–2	3–1	2–2	2–0	1–2	1–1	5–2	5–1	0–0	0–0	4–0	4–1	10–1	—	0–1
Welwyn Garden City	2–0	3–0	1–1	1–2	0–0	5–0	2–1	2–0	2–2	3–1	1–0	6–1	1–1	2–0	1–4	1–1	5–3	2–2	1–0	—

Source: Southern League
Legend: Blue = home team win; Yellow = draw; Red = away team win.

=== Stadia and locations ===
Locations of Division One Central clubs

Club	Location	Stadium	Capacity
AFC Dunstable	Dunstable	Creasey Park	3,200
Aylesbury United	Aylesbury	The Meadow (groundshare with Chesham United)	5,000
Barton Rovers	Barton-le-Clay	Sharpenhoe Road	4,000
Bedford Town	Bedford	The Eyrie	3,000
Berkhamsted	Berkhamsted	Broadwater	2,500
Biggleswade	Biggleswade	The Eyrie (groundshare with Bedford Town)	3,000
Colney Heath	Colney Heath	Recreation Ground	n/a
Didcot Town	Didcot	Loop Meadow	3,000
FC Romania	Cheshunt	Cheshunt Stadium (groundshare with Cheshunt)	3,000
Harlow Town	Harlow	The Harlow Arena	3,500
Hertford Town	Hertford	Hertingfordbury Park	6,500
Kempston Rovers	Kempston	Hillgrounds Leisure	2,000
Kidlington	Kidlington	Yarnton Road	1,500
North Leigh	North Leigh	Eynsham Hall Park Sports Ground	2,000
St Neots Town	St Neots	New Rowley Park	3,500
Thame United	Thame	Meadow View Park	2,000
Waltham Abbey	Waltham Abbey	Capershotts	3,500
Wantage Town	Wantage	Alfredian Park	1,500
Ware	Ware	Wodson Park	3,300
Welwyn Garden City	Welwyn Garden City	Herns Way	1,000

== Division One South ==
Southern Football League Division One South
- Season: 2021–22
- Champions: Plymouth Parkway
- Promoted: Plymouth Parkway; Winchester City
- Relegated: Mangotsfield United; Barnstaple Town
- Matches: 342
- Goals: 1,138 (3.33 per match)
- Highest attendance: 1,362; Plymouth Parkway 2–0 Cinderford Town (23 April 2022)
- Total attendance: 82,944
- Average attendance: 243 (+42.1% to previous full season)

After Moneyfields voluntary relegated from the league, Division One South consisted of 19 clubs: 17 clubs from the previous season, and two new clubs:

- Lymington Town, promoted from the Wessex League
- Plymouth Parkway, promoted from the Western League

=== League table ===
Pos	Team	Pld	W	D	L	GF	GA	GD	Pts	Promotion, qualification or relegation
1	Plymouth Parkway (C, P)	36	26	3	7	92	40	+52	81	Promoted to the Premier Division South
2	Frome Town	36	23	9	4	76	30	+46	78	Qualified for the play-offs (Note: Four teams play for one spot and promotion to Step 3.)
3	Cirencester Town	36	23	8	5	75	29	+46	77	Qualified for the play-offs, then transferred to Division One Central
4	Winchester City (O, P)	36	21	8	7	93	47	+46	71	Qualified for the play-offs
5	Bristol Manor Farm	36	20	9	7	64	41	+23	69	Qualified for the play-offs
6	AFC Totton	36	21	5	10	83	37	+46	68	
7	Sholing	36	19	6	11	59	36	+23	63	
8	Melksham Town	36	15	8	13	56	59	−3	53	
9	Paulton Rovers	36	14	7	15	72	61	+11	49	
10	Highworth Town	36	12	6	18	41	59	−18	42	Transferred to Division One Central
11	Larkhall Athletic	36	9	12	15	43	48	−5	39	
12	Bideford	36	11	6	19	36	55	−19	39	
13	Evesham United	36	11	6	19	50	72	−22	39	
14	Slimbridge	36	11	5	20	52	83	−31	38	
15	Willand Rovers	36	10	7	19	54	62	−8	37	
16	Lymington Town	36	9	9	18	51	90	−39	36	Reprieved from the inter-step play-off (Note: Ten of the 16 clubs at Step 4, all eight fourth-from-bottom teams and two clubs placed third-from-bottom, one at the top and the other in third place on a points per game (PPG) basis, were reprieved from contesting relegation play-offs.)
17	Cinderford Town	36	8	7	21	54	83	−29	31	Qualified for the inter-step play-off, then reprieved from relegation (Note: Contested a one-off play-off match as one of the remaining six third-from-bottom teams against one of six runners-up from Step 5 that had the fewest PPG at the end of the 2021–22 season. The winner rose to Step 4 for the 2022–23 season, while the loser dropped to Step 5. Although Cinderford Town lost the inter-step play-off, they were reprieved from relegation due to Walton Casuals' withdrawal from the Southern League in June 2022.)
18	Mangotsfield United (R)	36	7	6	23	42	91	−49	27	Relegated to the Hellenic League
19	Barnstaple Town (R)	36	7	3	26	45	115	−70	24	Relegated to the Western League

Source: Southern League website, Non League Matters
Rules for classification: 1) points; 2) goal difference; 3) number of goals scored; 4) number of matches won; 5) head-to-head results
(C) Champions; (O) Play-off winners; (P) Promoted; (R) Relegated

==== Play-offs ====
Semi-finals
2	Frome Town	1
5	Bristol Manor Farm	3
3	Cirencester Town	1
4	Winchester City	4

Final
4	Winchester City	4
5	Bristol Manor Farm	1

Semi-finals

26 April 2022	Frome Town	1–3	Bristol Manor Farm	Badger Hill, Frome
19:45 (UTC+01:00)	O'Loughlin 32'		Simpson 33'; Howe 53'; Howe 71'	Attendance: 1,158

26 April 2022	Cirencester Town	1–4 (a.e.t.)	Winchester City	Corinium Stadium, Cirencester
19:45 (UTC+01:00)	Grace-Parsons 77'		Feeney 59'; Griggs 103'; Smith 109'; Smith 115'	Attendance: 393

Final

2 May 2022	Winchester City	4–1	Bristol Manor Farm	Charters Community Stadium, Winchester
15:00 (UTC+01:00)	Bentley 7'; Feeney 26'; Mlambo 58'; Smith 90+6'		Gosling 70'	Attendance: 1,025

==== Inter-step play-off ====
30 April 2022	Cinderford Town	1–5	Skelmersdale United	Causeway Ground, Cinderford
15:00 (UTC+01:00)	Drew 80'		Howard 33', 47', 88', 90+3'; Conteh 65'	Attendance: 360

=== Results ===
Home \ Away	TOT	BAR	BID	BMF	CIN	CIR	EVE	FRO	HWT	LAR	LYM	MAN	MEL	PAU	PLY	SHO	SLI	WIL	WIN
AFC Totton	—	0–0	4–2	1–2	4–0	1–0	1–0	3–0	3–1	1–2	7–1	3–0	1–0	2–4	1–0	0–1	0–3	2–0	2–2
Barnstaple Town	1–8	—	1–0	4–5	0–7	1–5	2–1	1–4	4–0	2–1	1–3	2–1	0–2	1–5	0–4	0–3	3–2	0–4	2–4
Bideford	1–0	1–0	—	1–0	0–2	0–2	0–1	2–2	2–1	1–0	1–2	4–0	0–2	0–2	1–2	0–3	2–0	0–4	1–2
Bristol Manor Farm	2–2	3–1	0–2	—	0–0	1–0	2–1	0–3	4–0	3–0	0–0	2–0	1–3	2–0	4–2	1–0	0–0	2–0	2–2
Cinderford Town	1–8	3–2	1–0	1–2	—	0–0	1–2	2–3	1–1	1–0	3–3	3–0	1–0	2–4	2–3	1–4	1–2	2–1	2–5
Cirencester Town	2–0	2–1	1–1	3–2	2–0	—	3–1	1–1	1–0	1–1	3–0	2–2	3–1	4–3	3–1	1–0	6–0	0–1	4–2
Evesham United	3–3	3–2	0–0	1–1	2–1	0–3	—	1–4	4–1	2–0	4–3	2–1	0–1	1–4	3–1	2–2	1–2	1–4	1–5
Frome Town	0–2	9–2	2–0	0–0	5–2	0–2	1–1	—	1–0	1–1	2–0	3–0	3–3	2–1	1–0	3–2	2–0	3–0	2–0
Highworth Town	0–3	1–0	4–1	1–2	2–1	1–3	5–1	1–0	—	0–0	1–2	2–0	1–0	4–1	1–2	1–1	0–0	3–3	0–3
Larkhall Athletic	1–2	9–1	0–1	2–2	3–3	0–3	3–3	0–0	1–0	—	1–1	0–2	0–2	2–1	0–1	0–3	3–1	1–0	0–2
Lymington Town	0–4	3–2	2–1	1–2	3–2	0–0	3–1	0–5	1–1	1–1	—	3–0	2–2	0–7	1–4	2–5	2–3	2–2	0–1
Mangotsfield United	0–5	2–2	3–1	0–3	3–1	1–5	3–2	0–2	0–1	1–4	3–1	—	0–2	2–4	0–6	0–2	2–0	2–2	2–4
Melksham Town	0–1	1–2	2–2	0–4	4–2	1–1	1–3	0–3	2–0	0–0	3–2	3–3	—	1–0	4–3	1–0	2–1	4–2	2–2
Paulton Rovers	0–0	3–2	1–2	1–3	3–0	1–2	1–2	0–2	2–3	0–0	2–2	1–1	3–0	—	1–2	1–0	5–1	3–2	0–4
Plymouth Parkway	1–0	4–1	4–0	0–2	3–0	1–0	2–0	2–2	2–0	1–0	4–1	4–0	1–1	5–1	—	4–1	6–1	4–1	1–0
Sholing	2–1	1–0	1–1	2–1	0–0	0–0	1–0	0–1	4–0	0–0	3–1	4–1	5–0	0–2	0–2	—	2–1	2–1	2–0
Slimbridge	1–3	3–0	1–0	1–1	3–3	3–2	2–0	0–2	4–2	2–3	3–0	3–5	0–5	3–3	1–3	3–0	—	2–3	0–4
Willand Rovers	1–4	1–1	1–2	1–2	3–1	0–3	1–0	1–2	0–1	1–0	1–2	1–1	3–1	0–0	3–4	1–2	3–0	—	1–3
Winchester City	3–1	7–1	2–2	5–1	3–1	1–3	2–0	0–0	0–1	2–4	5–1	2–1	3–0	2–2	3–3	3–1	4–0	1–1	—

Source: Southern League
Legend: Blue = home team win; Yellow = draw; Red = away team win.

=== Stadia and locations ===
Locations of Division One South clubs

Club	Location	Stadium	Capacity
AFC Totton	Totton	Testwood Stadium	3,000
Barnstaple Town	Barnstaple	Mill Road	5,000
Bideford	Bideford	The Sports Ground	2,000
Bristol Manor Farm	Bristol (Sea Mills)	The Creek	2,000
Cinderford Town	Cinderford	Causeway Ground	3,500
Cirencester Town	Cirencester	Corinium Stadium	4,500
Evesham United	Evesham	Jubilee Stadium	3,000
Frome Town	Frome	Badgers Hill	2,000
Highworth Town	Highworth	The Elms Recreation Ground	2,000
Larkhall Athletic	Bath (Larkhall)	The Plain Ham Ground	1,000
Lymington Town	Lymington	The Sports Ground	1,000
Mangotsfield United	Mangotsfield	Cossham Street	2,500
Melksham Town	Melksham	Oakfield Stadium	2,500
Paulton Rovers	Paulton	Athletic Field	2,500
Plymouth Parkway	Plymouth	Bolitho Park	3,500
Sholing	Sholing	Portsmouth Road	1,000
Slimbridge	Slimbridge	Thornhill Park	1,500
Willand Rovers	Willand	Silver Street	1,000
Winchester City	Winchester	The City Ground	4,500

== Relegation reprieves ==
=== Step 3 ===
Seven clubs at Step 3, all four fourth-from-bottom teams and those placed third-from-bottom that are the top three on a points per game (PPG) basis, were reprieved from relegation. The remaining team was relegated to Step 4.

The final points-per-game ranking of the third-from-bottom placed teams in Step 3 divisions was as follows:

Pos	Team	League	Pld	Pts	PPG	Qualification
5	Basford United	Northern Premier League Premier Division	42	45	1.071	Retention at Step 3
6	Barwell	Southern League Premier Division Central	40	41	1.025	Retention at Step 3
7	Kings Langley	Southern League Premier Division South	42	37	0.881	Retention at Step 3
8	Leatherhead	Isthmian League Premier Division	42	36	0.857	Relegation to Step 4

=== Step 4 ===
Ten of the 16 clubs at Step 4, all eight fourth-from-bottom teams and two clubs placed third-from-bottom, one at the top and the other in third place on a points per game (PPG) basis, were reprieved from contesting relegation play-offs. The FA granted third-placed Sheffield a reprieve after demoting Yorkshire Amateur from the Northern Premier League for non-compliance with Step 4 ground grading requirements. The remaining six teams contested one-off matches with six runners-up from Step 5 that had the fewest PPG at the end of the 2021–22 season. Three winners of their matches stayed at Step 4 for the 2022–23 season, while three others lost theirs and were relegated to Step 5.

The final points-per-game ranking of the 3rd-from-bottom-placed teams in Step 4 divisions was also as follows:

Pos	Team	League	Pld	Pts	PPG	Qualification
9	Prescot Cables	Northern Premier League Division One West	38	39	1.026	Retention at Step 4
10	Lancing	Isthmian League South East Division	38	36	0.947	Relegation match with a Step 5 team
11	Sheffield	Northern Premier League Division One East	36	33	0.917	Retention at Step 4
12	Witham Town	Isthmian League North Division	38	33	0.863	Relegation match with a Step 5 team
13	Cinderford Town	Southern League Division One South	36	31	0.861	Relegation match with a Step 5 team
14	Kempston Rovers	Southern League Division One Central	38	29	0.763	Relegation match with a Step 5 team
15	Histon	Northern Premier League Division One Midlands	38	24	0.632	Relegation match with a Step 5 team
16	Chalfont St Peter	Isthmian League South Central Division	36	21	0.583	Relegation match with a Step 5 team

== See also ==
- Southern Football League
- 2021–22 Isthmian League
- 2021–22 Northern Premier League
