= Jamarl Joseph =

English association football player

Personal information
- Full name: Jamarl Anthony Joseph
- Date of birth: 12 July 1995 (age 31)
- Place of birth: London, England
- Height: 1.80 m (5 ft 11 in)
- Position: Midfielder

Youth career
- 2004–2006: Charlton
- 2006–2010: Fulham

Senior career*
Years	Team	Apps	(Gls)
2018	Hanwell Town	5	(0)
2019	Kensington & Ealing Borough	10	(6)
2020	Chalfont St Peter	7	(0)
2020	Senica	1	(0)
- * Club domestic league appearances and goals as of 11:54, 13 July 2020 (UTC)

Jamarl Anthony Joseph (born 12 July 1995) is an English professional footballer who played as a midfielder. In 2024 he was jailed for over 17 years for conspiracy to supply controlled class A and class B drugs.

== Career ==
Joseph played for Hanwell Town in 2018 before later joining Chalfont St Peter from Kensington & Ealing Borough.

In the summer of 2020, Joseph joined Slovak Super Liga side Senica, making his professional debut as a substitute in a 3–1 defeat to AS Trenčín.

== Personal life ==
On 17 May 2024 Joseph was jailed for 26 years and six months (reduced to 17 years and six months) at Isleworth Crown Court having plead guilty at an earlier hearing to conspiracy to supply controlled class A drugs (cocaine) and conspiracy to supply controlled class B drugs (ketamine).
