= 2021–22 Wessex Football League =

Wessex Football League
- Season: 2021–22
- Champions: Hamworthy United
- Relegated: Infinity (resigned)

The 2021–22 Wessex Football League season (known as the Sydenhams Football League (Wessex) for sponsorship reasons) was the 36th in the history of the Wessex Football League since its establishment in 1986. The league consists of two divisions: the Premier Division and Division One.

The constitution was announced on 18 May 2021.

After the abandonment of the previous two seasons due to the COVID-19 pandemic, a number of promotions were decided on a points per game basis over the 2019–20 and 2020–21 seasons.

== Premier Division ==
The Premier Division was increased from 20 clubs to 21, after Lymington Town were promoted to the Southern League, and Fleet Town and Tadley Calleva were transferred to the Combined Counties League.

Four new teams joined the division:

- Three promoted from Division One:
  - Alton
  - Hythe & Dibden
  - United Services Portsmouth
- One resigned from Southern League Division One South:
  - Moneyfields

=== League table ===
Pos	Team	Pld	W	D	L	GF	GA	GD	Pts	Promotion, qualification or relegation
1	Hamworthy United (C, P)	40	30	9	1	102	29	+73	99	Promoted to Southern League South Division
2	Bashley (Note: Bashley were promoted as they were one of ten runners-up at Step 5 promoted on a PPG (points per game) basis.) (P)	40	28	6	6	105	44	+61	90	Promoted to Southern League South Division
3	Shaftesbury	40	26	7	7	126	51	+75	85	
4	Horndean	40	26	5	9	116	43	+73	83	
5	AFC Stoneham	40	22	12	6	96	51	+45	78	
6	Brockenhurst	40	24	6	10	91	47	+44	78	
7	AFC Portchester	40	21	9	10	99	51	+48	72	
8	Baffins Milton Rovers	40	20	6	14	87	62	+25	66	
9	Moneyfields	40	18	10	12	92	62	+30	64	
10	Alton	40	18	8	14	74	80	−6	62	Transferred to the Combined Counties League
11	Hamble Club	40	14	7	19	63	79	−16	49	
12	Fareham Town	40	13	8	19	113	98	+15	47	
13	Blackfield & Langley (Note: The match between Blackfield & Langley and Christchurch on 26 February 2022 was abandoned by the referee, with Blackfield leading 3–0, after an incident involving players and spectators. The match remained unplayed at the end of the season.)	39	14	5	20	75	72	+3	47	
14	Alresford Town	40	12	9	19	71	81	−10	45	
15	Portland United	40	9	11	20	65	91	−26	38	
16	Cowes Sports	40	9	8	23	49	112	−63	35	
17	United Services Portsmouth	40	10	7	23	50	97	−47	34 (Note: United Services Portsmouth had three points deducted.)	
18	Bournemouth	40	8	8	24	67	104	−37	32	
19	Christchurch	39	8	7	24	43	118	−75	31	
20	Hythe & Dibden	40	9	2	29	38	123	−85	29	Reprieved from relegation (Note: Hythe & Dibden were one of the twelve clubs with the most PPG (points per game) out of 16 second-bottom clubs at Step 5, and were reprieved from relegation.)
21	Amesbury Town (R)	40	3	4	33	30	157	−127	13	Relegated to Division One

Source: Wessex League
Rules for classification: 1) points; 2) goal difference; 3) number of goals scored.
(C) Champions; (P) Promoted; (R) Relegated

=== Stadia and locations ===
Location of the clubs in the 2021–22 Wessex Football League Premier Division (Dorset)
Location of the clubs in the 2021–22 Wessex Football League Premier Division (Hampshire)

Club	Location	Stadium	Capacity
A.F.C. Portchester	Fareham	Wicor Recreation Ground	
A.F.C. Stoneham	Eastleigh	Stoneham Lane Football Complex	1,000
Alresford Town	New Alresford	Arlebury Park	1,000
Alton	Alton	Anstey Park	2,000
Amesbury Town	Amesbury	Bonnymead Park	1,000
Baffins Milton Rovers	Portsmouth	PMC Stadium	
Bashley	Bashley	Bashley Road	4,250
Blackfield & Langley	Fawley	Gang Warily Recreation Centre	2,500
Bournemouth	Bournemouth	Victoria Park	3,000
Brockenhurst	Brockenhurst	Grigg Lane	2,000
Christchurch	Hurn	Hurn Bridge Sports Club	2,000
Cowes Sports	Cowes	Westwood Park	2,000
Fareham Town	Fareham	Cams Alder Stadium	5,500
Hamble Club	Hamble-le-Rice	Hamble Community Facility	
Hamworthy United	Poole	County Ground	1,000
Horndean	Horndean	Five Heads Park	2,000
Hythe & Dibden	Dibden	Clayfields Sport Centre	1,000
Moneyfields	Portsmouth	John Jenkins Stadium	1,180
Portland United	Portland	Camp and Satherley Stadium	2,000
Shaftesbury	Shaftesbury	Cockrams	1,000
United Services Portsmouth	Portsmouth	Victory Stadium	1,000

== Division One ==
Division One was increased from 19 clubs to 20 after Alton, Hythe & Dibden and US Portsmouth were promoted to the Premier Division.

Four new teams joined the division:

- Two transferred from the Combined Counties League Division One:
  - Ash United
  - Fleet Spurs
- Two promoted from the Hampshire Premier League:
  - Infinity
  - Millbrook, changing their name from Bush Hill F.C. prior to this season

Infinity withdrew from the league on 6 February 2022 after their groundshare agreement with Hythe & Dibden was terminated by Hythe. This followed an incident in which an Infinity player was sent off during a match for using racist language. Subsequent attempts to find another ground at which Infinity could play were unsuccessful. Infinity's playing record was later expunged from the league table.

=== League table ===
Pos	Team	Pld	W	D	L	GF	GA	GD	Pts	Promotion, qualification or relegation
1	Bemerton Heath Harlequins (C, P)	36	26	7	3	110	27	+83	85	Promoted to the Premier Division
2	Andover New Street	36	26	6	4	120	41	+79	84	Qualification for the play-offs
3	Newport (IOW)	36	26	4	6	113	50	+63	82	Qualification for the play-offs
4	Folland Sports	36	25	6	5	115	45	+70	81	Qualification for the play-offs
5	Laverstock & Ford (O, P)	36	24	6	6	91	51	+40	78	Qualification for the play-offs
6	Andover Town	36	22	6	8	99	53	+46	72	
7	Downton	36	19	8	9	87	53	+34	65	
8	Romsey Town	36	19	3	14	78	61	+17	60	
9	New Milton Town	36	17	5	14	72	59	+13	56	
10	Verwood Town	36	14	4	18	69	87	−18	46	
11	Millbrook	36	14	3	19	72	111	−39	45	
12	Petersfield Town	36	10	6	20	49	71	−22	36	
13	Whitchurch United	36	10	5	21	44	73	−29	35	
14	Ringwood Town	36	9	6	21	49	91	−42	33	
15	Ash United	36	9	3	24	43	98	−55	30	
16	Fawley	36	7	7	22	48	76	−28	28	
17	East Cowes Victoria Athletic	36	7	6	23	49	101	−52	27	
18	Fleet Spurs	36	5	6	25	36	98	−62	21	Reprieved from relegation (Note: All third-from-bottom sides at Step 6 were reprieved from relegation, and a number of second-from-bottom sides, including Totton & Eling, were reprieved on a PPG (points per game) basis.)
19	Totton & Eling	36	2	5	29	33	131	−98	11	Reprieved from relegation
20	Infinity (Note: Infinity resigned from the league in February 2022, and their record of P23 W5 D1 L17 GF34 GA77 Pts16 was subsequently expunged.)	0	0	0	0	0	0	0	0	Resigned from the league

Source: Wessex League
Rules for classification: 1) points; 2) goal difference; 3) number of goals scored.
(C) Champions; (O) Play-off winners; (P) Promoted

=== Promotion playoffs ===
Semi-finals
2	Andover New Street	0
5	Laverstock & Ford	3
3	Newport (IOW)	2 (5)
4	Folland Sports	2 (4)

Final
3	Newport (IOW)	2
5	Laverstock & Ford (a.e.t.)	3

==== Semifinals ====
19 April 2022	Andover New Street	0–3	Laverstock & Ford	Charlton
		Report		Stadium: Foxcotte Park; Attendance: 489

19 April 2022	Newport (IOW)	2–2 (a.e.t.) (5–4 p)	Folland Sports	Cowes
		Report		Stadium: Westwood Park; Attendance: 232

==== Final ====
30 April 2022	Newport (IOW)	2–3 (a.e.t.)	Laverstock & Ford	Cowes
		Report		Stadium: Westwood Park; Attendance: 488

=== Stadia and locations ===
Location of the clubs in the 2021–22 Wessex Football League Division One

Club	Location	Stadium	Capacity
Andover New Street	Charlton	Foxcotte Park	1,000
Andover Town	Andover	Portway Stadium	3,000
Ash United	Ash	Shawfield Road	2,500
Bemerton Heath Harlequins	Bemerton	Moon Park	2,100
Downton	Downton	Brian Whitehead Sports Ground	2,000
East Cowes Victoria	East Cowes	Beatrice Avenue	1,000
Fawley	Holbury	Waterside Sports & Social Club	1,000
Fleet Spurs	Fleet	Kennels Lane	1,000
Folland Sports	Hamble-le-Rice	Folland Park	1,000
Infinity	Hythe	Clayfields Sport Centre (groundshare with Hythe & Dibden)	1,000
Laverstock & Ford	Laverstock	Church Road	
Millbrook	Southampton	Test Park	1,000
New Milton Town	New Milton	Fawcetts Field	3,000
Newport (IOW)	Newport	Beatrice Avenue (groundshare with East Cowes Victoria)	1,000
Petersfield Town	Petersfield	The Southdown Builders Stadium	3,000
Ringwood Town	Ringwood	Long Lane	1,000
Romsey Town	Romsey	Southampton Road	
Totton & Eling	Southampton	Little Testwood Farm	1,500
Verwood Town	Verwood	Potterne Park	1,000
Whitchurch United	Whitchurch	Longmeadow	1,000
