= North Greenford United F.C. =

Association football club in England

Coordinates: 51°32′52″N 0°20′20″W

North Greenford United
- Full name: North Greenford United Football Club
- Nickname: The Blues
- Founded: 1944; 82 years ago
- Ground: Berkeley Fields, Greenford
- Capacity: 2,000
- Chairman: Paul Mills
- Manager: Joey Gritt
- League: Combined Counties League Premier Division North
- 2024–25: Combined Counties League Premier Division North, 5th of 20
Home colours	Away colours

North Greenford United Football Club is a football club based in Greenford in the London Borough of Ealing, England. They play in the Combined Counties League Premier Division North. The club is affiliated to the Middlesex County Football Association.

== History ==
Established in 1944, originally as a youth club and started playing senior football in the 1946–47 season when they joined the Hanwell and District League, finishing as runners-up at the first attempt. A season later the club joined the Harrow Wembley League, and winning the senior division of that league at the end of the 1954–55 season. The club then played in the Middlesex League Premier Division In the 1982–83 season they won the Middlesex League Premier Division and gained promotion to Division One of the London Spartan League.

At the end of the 1987–88 season the club gained promotion to the Premier Division of the London Spartan League. At the end of the 1993–94 season the club left the Spartan league, and dropped down a level to the Middlesex County Football League Premier Division. The club then lost its senior status with the Middlesex County Football Association and spent the next few seasons upgrading their ground to move from intermediate status back up to senior status. This work culminated in the club being elected to the Combined Counties Football League for the start of the 2002–03 season.

The club finished as runners-up in the league in their third season in the league. That season, they also made their debut in the FA Cup, making it to the first qualifying round before being knocked out by Hemel Hempstead Town. The club then repeated this finish four seasons later in the 2008–09 season. The following season the club went one better as they became champions of the Combined Counties Football League, and earned promotion to Division One Central of the Southern Football League. They also completed a double by winning the Middlesex Senior Charity Cup when they beat Enfield Town 1–0 in the final at The Beveree Stadium.

North Greenford United finished 18th in the 2010–11 campaign, in their first season at that level. After a disappointing opening half to the 2011–12 campaign, the club announced that they had parted company with manager Steve Ringrose who had been in charge for three years. On Boxing Day 2011, the club confirmed the appointment of former Chelsea, Wimbledon and Crystal Palace striker Neil Shipperley as their new manager. He was assisted by his former Chelsea teammate Mark Nicholls.

However upon the conclusion of the season, Shipperley resigned to look for a management position at a higher level after successfully guiding the side to safety. The club appointed former Bedfont Town midfielder and caretaker boss Jon-Barrie Bates as his successor in early June. Bates was sacked after just eight games following the club's poor start to the season paving the way for the return of Shipperley for a second spell as manager.

On 17 August 2013, former professional goalkeeper Dave Beasant came out of retirement for one game at the age of 54, to appear for North Greenford United in their 2–0 defeat to Chalfont St Peter.

Neil Shipperley resigned from his position of manager in February 2014, and he was replaced by reserve team boss Paul Palmer shortly after. Palmer, however, was sacked after a 4–1 defeat to Chalfont St Peter on 11 September 2014. Don Bennett was appointed as caretaker with his first game in charge a 1–1 draw with Uxbridge.

Bennett was then appointed as the permanent successor to Palmer, but resigned in December 2014. Reserve team manager Barry Morris was placed in caretaker charge.

The club had narrowly avoided relegation in the previous two seasons, but were set to be relegated after finishing 21st in 2015 before being handed a relegation reprieve. They therefore remained in the Southern Football League for the 2015–16 season.

After being handed a reprieve from relegation, the board appointed Morris as manager on a permanent basis after an upturn in results towards the end of the 2014–15 season. Morris and his coaching staff were tasked with trying to keep North Greenford United in the Southern Football League.

Morris was replaced by assistant George Bouhet early into the 2015–16 season, but Bouhet left the club in November 2015 following a poor run of results. On 7 November 2015, former North Greenford United players Ricky Pither and Danny Bennell were appointed joint-managers with another former North Greenford player, Chris Mills, and Mark Chandler joining as assistant coaches.

However, North Greenford United's six-year stay at Step 4 came to an end on 19 April 2016 as a 3–1 defeat to Kings Langley confirmed their relegation from the Southern Football League. In June 2016, North Greenford successfully appealed against their placement in the Hellenic Football League and were instead placed in the equivalent, but enlarged, Combined Counties League Premier Division. After two midtable seasons in the Combined Counties Premier Division, North Greenford United was transferred to the Spartan South Midlands Football League Premier Division. In their first season in the league, they finished five points clear of relegation. The following season was cancelled in March 2020 due to the COVID-19 pandemic, with no promotion or relegation taking place. North Greenford United were 20th when the 2019–20 season was cancelled. The 2020–21 season was also cancelled.

For the 2021–22 season, North Greenford United was transferred to the Combined Counties Football League Premier Division North, finishing 5th in their first season, then 8th in the 2022–23 season. In 2023–24, the club finished 8th, and reached the quarterfinals of the FA Vase for the first and only time in their history, but lost 1–0 at home to Romford, the winners of the FA Vase that season. They also reached the final of the Middlesex Senior Charity Cup, losing 2–1 to Uxbridge.

North Greenford United started the 2024–25 season well, sitting at the top of the table at the end of September, and they were 4th at the start of January. However, with only three games left to play, North Greenford United were in 9th place, seven points away from the playoff spots, with a game in hand on both Holyport and Burnham, who were only other teams that could mathematically qualify. North Greenford United then beat Burnham, and won their final two games afterwards, and with Holyport and Burnham both losing on the final day, North Greenford United finished 5th, qualifying for the playoffs. They lost the playoff semifinal 3–1 away at Bedfont Sports, who also won the playoff final. North Greenford United also reached the Cherry Red Records Premier Challenge Cup Final, losing 3–1 to Cobham.

In the summer of 2025, Joey Gritt was appointed as the new manager of North Greenford United.

== Ground ==
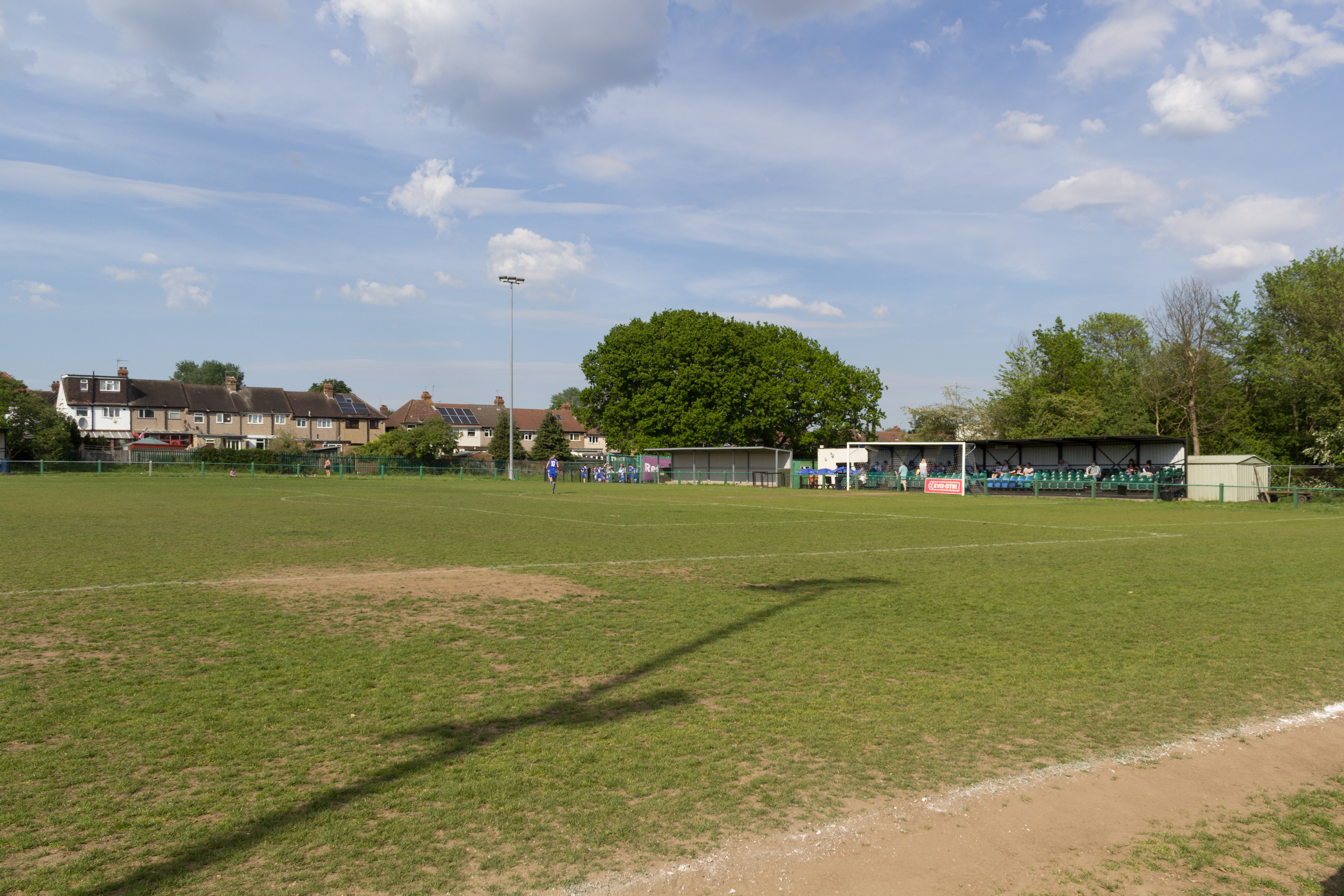
Berkeley Fields in May 2016

North Greenford United play their games at Berkeley Fields, Berkeley Avenue, Greenford, UB6 0NX.

== Honours ==
=== League honours ===
- Combined Counties Football League Premier Division
  - Winners (1): 2009–10
  - Runners-up (2): 2004–05, 2008–09
- Middlesex League Premier Division
  - Winners (1): 1982–83
  - Runners-up (1): 1972–73
- Harrow Wembley League Senior Division
  - Winners (1): 1954–55
- Hanwell and District League
  - Runners-up (1): 1946–47

=== Cup honours ===
- Combined Counties Football League Premier Challenge Cup
  - Runners-up (3): 2003–04, 2006–07, 2024–25
- Middlesex Senior Charity Cup
  - Winners (1): 2009–10
  - Runners-up (1): 2023–24
- The Harry Sutherland Shield
  - Winners (2): 1984–85, 1985–86
- West London Combination Cup
  - Winners (2): 1966–67, 1967–68
- Kings College Hospital Cup
  - Winners (2): 1968–69, 1969–70
- Hounslow Senior Charity Cup
  - Winners (1): 1970–71
  - Runners-up (1): 1972–73
- Harrow Wembley League Senior Cup
  - Winners (1): 1956–57
- Brentford League Senior Cup
  - Winners (2): 1961–62, 1963–64
  - Runners-up (2): 1959–60, 1964–65
- Harrow Senior Charity Cup
  - Winners (1): 1964–65
- Middlesex Intermediate Cup
  - Winners (1): 1973–74
- Middlesex Junior Cup
  - Runners-up (1): 1956–57
- Richmond Challenge Cup
  - Winners (1): 1959–60
- Hanwell Hospital Cup
  - Runners-up (1): 1946–47

== Records ==
- Highest League Position: 18th, Southern League Division One Central, 2010–11
- FA Cup best performance: Third Qualifying Round – 2010–11, 2011–12
- FA Trophy best performance: First Qualifying round 2010–11
- FA Vase best performance: Quarter-finals 2023-24
