= 2020–21 Wessex Football League =

Wessex Football League
- Season: 2020–21

The 2020–21 Wessex Football League season (known as the Sydenhams Football League (Wessex) for sponsorship reasons) was the 35th in the history of the Wessex Football League since its establishment in 1986. The league consisted of two divisions: the Premier Division and Division One.

The constitution was announced on 21 July 2020.

After the abandonment of the previous season due to the COVID-19 pandemic, the league's constitution largely remained unchanged, with the planned structural changes being put back to this season.

This season, the Premier Division champions were to be promoted to Step 4. The runners-up in this division and ten other Step 5 divisions in other leagues were to be ranked according to PPG (points per game), and the top four in that ranking would have also been promoted. The remaining seven runners-up would compete in "winner takes all" play-offs with seven clubs finishing bottom in Step 4 leagues, the winners being placed at Step 4 and the losers at Step 5 for 2021–22.

The bottom clubs in all 14 Step 5 divisions were to be ranked according to PPG, with the 12 lowest-ranked clubs relegated to Step 6.

In Division One, the top four clubs were to be promoted to Step 5, and the bottom two were liable to relegation to Step 7.

== Curtailment ==
On 24 February 2021, after fixtures had been suspended in December 2020, the FA curtailed the season for all leagues at Steps 3–6, again due to the COVID-19 pandemic.

== Premier Division ==
The Premier Division remained at 20 clubs, with the same constitution as the previous season except for the absence of Solent University, who resigned from the league in June 2020.

One new team joined the division:

- Blackfield & Langley, resigned from the Southern League Premier Division South.

=== League table at time of curtailment ===
Pos	Team	Pld	W	D	L	GF	GA	GD	Pts	Promotion or qualification
1	Hamworthy United	14	12	1	1	50	9	+41	37	
2	Lymington Town	12	11	0	1	23	4	+19	33	Promotion to the Southern League (Note: Lymington Town promoted based on points per game calculations from 2019–20 & 2020–21 seasons combined.)
3	Horndean	13	10	1	2	32	15	+17	31	
4	Fareham Town	11	8	2	1	33	12	+21	26	
5	Blackfield & Langley	13	8	1	4	27	20	+7	25	
6	Christchurch	11	7	2	2	23	8	+15	23	
7	Fleet Town	14	6	4	4	28	20	+8	22	Transfer to the Combined Counties Premier South
8	AFC Stoneham	12	7	0	5	35	15	+20	21	
9	AFC Portchester	12	6	1	5	20	15	+5	19	
10	Bashley	12	6	0	6	19	22	−3	18	
11	Tadley Calleva	11	5	2	4	17	18	−1	17	Transfer to the Combined Counties Premier North
12	Baffins Milton Rovers	13	3	4	6	21	25	−4	13	
13	Bournemouth	14	3	3	8	15	39	−24	12	
14	Hamble Club	13	2	5	6	16	23	−7	11	
15	Brockenhurst	10	3	2	5	10	20	−10	11	
16	Shaftesbury	12	3	1	8	19	34	−15	10	
17	Cowes Sports	11	2	2	7	16	24	−8	8	
18	Portland United	15	2	2	11	16	51	−35	8	
19	Alresford Town	13	1	4	8	14	39	−25	7	
20	Amesbury Town	12	0	1	11	5	26	−21	1	

Source: FA Full-Time
Rules for classification: 1) points; 2) goal difference; 3) number of goals scored.

== Division One ==
Division One was reduced from 20 clubs to 19 after Pewsey Vale resigned during the previous season.

=== League table at time of curtailment ===
Pos	Team	Pld	W	D	L	GF	GA	GD	Pts	Promotion
1	Laverstock & Ford	14	11	3	0	47	18	+29	36	
2	Alton	11	9	1	1	29	14	+15	28	Promotion to the Premier Division (Note: Promotions based on points per game calculations from 2019–20 & 2020–21 seasons combined.)
3	Folland Sports	12	7	2	3	33	17	+16	23	
4	United Services Portsmouth	10	7	0	3	30	13	+17	21	Promotion to the Premier Division
5	Bemerton Heath Harlequins	11	6	3	2	25	18	+7	21	
6	Newport (IOW)	11	6	1	4	29	19	+10	19	
7	Andover Town	12	5	4	3	25	22	+3	19	
8	Ringwood Town	12	5	2	5	25	30	−5	17	
9	Verwood Town	11	4	4	3	20	17	+3	16	
10	Hythe & Dibden	11	4	4	3	19	21	−2	16	Promotion to the Premier Division
11	Andover New Street	12	4	3	5	16	20	−4	15	
12	Petersfield Town	10	4	2	4	15	19	−4	14	
13	Downton	14	3	2	9	20	29	−9	11	
14	Fawley	11	3	1	7	15	27	−12	10	
15	East Cowes Victoria Athletic	12	2	4	6	13	29	−16	10	
16	Romsey Town	8	3	0	5	11	13	−2	9	
17	Whitchurch United	11	3	0	8	18	32	−14	9	
18	New Milton Town	11	2	2	7	19	27	−8	8	
19	Totton & Eling	12	1	0	11	10	34	−24	3	

Source: FA Full-Time, League Official
Rules for classification: 1) points; 2) goal difference; 3) number of goals scored.
