= St. Panteleimon F.C. =

Association football club in England

Coordinates: 51°47′30.22″N 0°05′18.03″W

St. Panteleimon
- Full name: St. Panteleimon Football Club
- Nickname(s): The Saints
- Founded: 16 May 2015
- Dissolved: 28 March 2024
- Ground: Hertingfordbury Park, Hertford
Home colours

St. Panteleimon Football Club was a football club based in Greenford, Greater London, England.

== History ==
The club was founded on 16 May 2015, for the Greek Orthodox community in London. St. Panteleimon initially competed in the KOPA League, before joining the Middlesex Football League. The club entered the FA Vase for the first time in 2018–19, beating Holmer Green 3–1 in their first match in the competition on 1 September 2018.

After winning the Premier Division of the Middlesex County League in 2018–19, the club were promoted to Division One of the Spartan South Midlands League. In 2021 the club were promoted to the Premier Division North of the Combined Counties League based on their results in the abandoned 2019–20 and 2020–21 seasons. After a single season in the Combined Counties League, the club transferred back to the Spartan South Midlands League, joining the Premier Division.

On 28 March 2024, St. Panteleimon chairman George Frangeskou announced the club would fold with immediate effect due to the "unsustainable" financial demands.

== Ground ==
The club most recently groundshared with Hertford Town at Hertingfordbury Park, having previously played at The Hive Stadium's facilities and groundsharing with Edgware Town at Silver Jubilee Park.

== Honours ==
- Middlesex County League
  - Premier Division Champions: 2018–19
  - Division One (Central & East) champions: 2017–18
  - The Alec Smith Premier Division Cup winners: 2018–19

== Records ==
- Best league position: 6th in the Spartan South Midlands League Premier Division, 2022–23
- Best FA Cup performance: Preliminary round, 2022–23
- Best FA Vase performance: Third round, 2022–23
