= Alfredian Park =

Football ground in Wantage, Oxfordshire, England

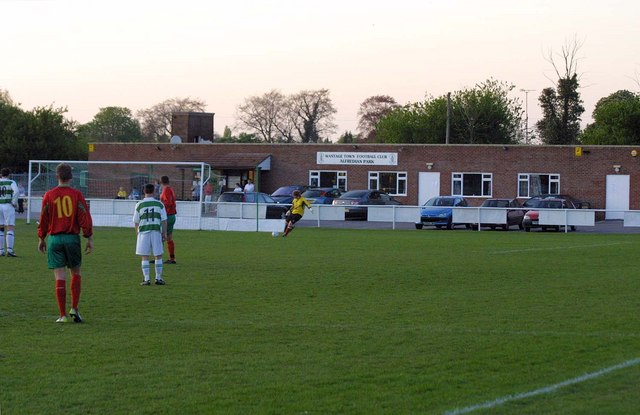
- The Clubhouse at Alfredian Park
- Interactive map of Alfredian Park
- Address: Manor Road
- Location: Wantage, Oxfordshire, England
- Coordinates: 51°34′55.7″N 1°25′48.8″W
- Capacity: Approximately 1,500
- Surface: Grass
- Record attendance: 550

Construction
- Opened: 1892
- Renovated: 2010

Tenant
- Wantage Town F.C.

Alfredian Park is a football ground in Wantage, Oxfordshire, England, and the home of Wantage Town Football Club of the Hellenic League Division One. It has a capacity of about 1,500.

== History ==
The ground was built in 1892, it was named after King Alfred the Great, who was born in Wantage. The ground is on the southern side of Wantage in Manor Road on the A338, around half a mile from the town centre (Market Place). The capacity of the ground is probably 1,500. The record attendance for the ground is 550 for a friendly match against Oxford United. The average attendance at the ground is 75.

The ground has a covered stand which occupies half of one side of the western end of the ground with seating for 85. The stand also has room for around 250, plus a few benches. The ground has a concrete path around the entire pitch. The clubhouse is on the northern end of the ground. Floodlights were added in 1996. The ground was refurbished in 2010.

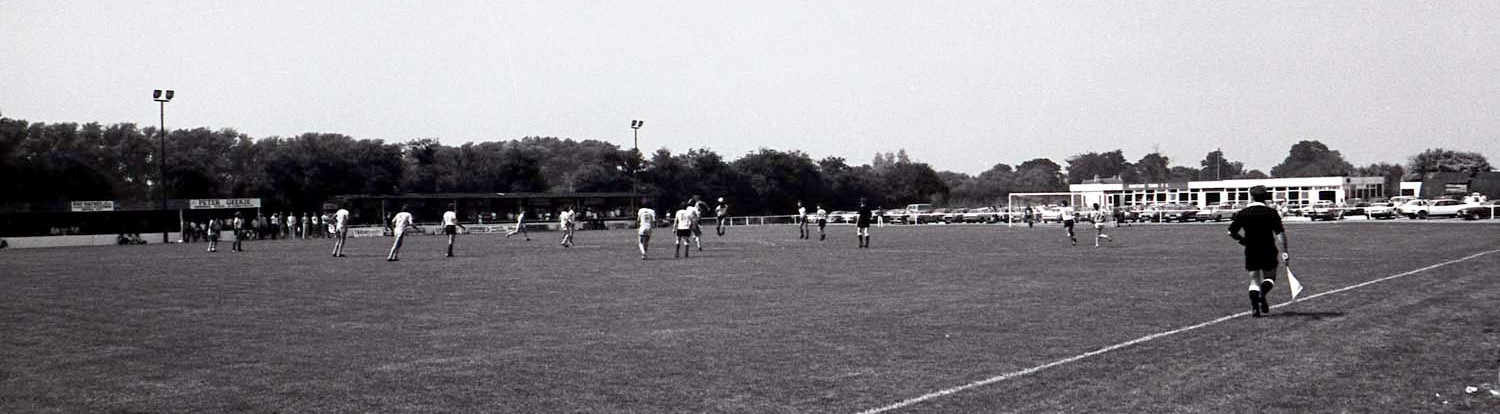
Image of Alfredian Park taken in 1983, with the Clubhouse (northern end) to the right and the main stands to the left (western end)
