= Enfield Borough F.C. =

Association football club in England

Coordinates: 51°36′24.649″N 0°10′17.540″W

Enfield Borough
- Full name: Enfield Borough Football Club
- Nickname: Panthers
- Founded: 2016
- Ground: The Maurice Rebak Stadium, Finchley
- Owners: Marvin Walker & Aaron Archer
- Chairman: Marvin Walker
- Manager: Olumide Durojaiye
- League: Eastern Counties League Division One South
- 2024–25: Eastern Counties League Division One South, 15th of 20
| Home colours colours | Away colours colours |

Enfield Borough Football Club is a football club based in Enfield, Greater London, England. They are currently members of the Eastern Counties League Division One South and play at Wingate & Finchley's Maurice Rebak Stadium.

== History ==
The club was established by former Brimsdown management team Marvin Walker and Aaron Archer in 2016 and joined Division Two of the Spartan South Midlands League. After finishing third in the division in their first season, they were promoted to Division One. At the end of the 2020–21 season the club were transferred to Division One of the Combined Counties League. After one season in the Combined Counties League, they were transferred to Division One South of the Eastern Counties League.

== Ground ==
The club played at Enfield Town's Queen Elizabeth II Stadium, before moving to the Maurice Rebak Stadium to groundshare with Wingate & Finchley prior to the 2018–19 season.

== Records ==
- Best FA Vase performance: Second round, 2017–18

== See also ==
- Enfield Borough F.C. managers
