= 1984–85 South Midlands League =

The 1984–85 South Midlands League season was 56th in the history of South Midlands League.

== Premier Division ==
South Midlands League Premier Division
- Season: 1984–85
- Champions: Eaton Bray United
- Promoted: Vauxhall Motors (Luton)
- Relegated: Brache Sparta

The Premier Division featured 11 clubs which competed in the division last season, along with 5 new clubs:

- New Bradwell St. Peter, promoted from last season's Division One
- Brache Sparta, promoted from last season's Division One
- Knebworth, promoted from last season's Division One
- Leighton Town, promoted from last season's Division One
- Hoddesdon Town, joined from the defunct Athenian League

=== League table ===
| Pos | Team | Pld | W | D | L | GF | GA | GD | Pts | Qualification |
|---|---|---|---|---|---|---|---|---|---|---|
| 1 | Eaton Bray United (C) | 30 | 20 | 7 | 3 | 71 | 34 | +37 | 47 | |
| 2 | Vauxhall Motors (Luton) (P) | 30 | 18 | 6 | 6 | 46 | 24 | +22 | 42 | Promotion to Isthmian League Division Two North |
| 3 | Shefford Town | 30 | 17 | 5 | 8 | 56 | 31 | +25 | 39 | |
| 4 | Knebworth | 30 | 15 | 9 | 6 | 44 | 32 | +12 | 39 | |
| 5 | Winslow United | 30 | 15 | 6 | 9 | 52 | 32 | +20 | 36 | |
| 6 | Shillington | 30 | 13 | 8 | 9 | 36 | 26 | +10 | 34 | |
| 7 | Hoddesdon Town | 30 | 13 | 7 | 10 | 53 | 37 | +16 | 33 | |
| 8 | The 61 FC Luton | 30 | 11 | 11 | 8 | 43 | 43 | 0 | 33 | |
| 9 | Pirton | 30 | 13 | 6 | 11 | 46 | 37 | +9 | 32 | |
| 10 | Selby | 30 | 12 | 5 | 13 | 35 | 45 | −10 | 29 | |
| 11 | Welwyn Garden City | 30 | 11 | 6 | 13 | 50 | 45 | +5 | 28 | |
| 12 | New Bradwell St. Peter | 30 | 8 | 7 | 15 | 31 | 45 | −14 | 23 | |
| 13 | Leighton Town | 30 | 9 | 4 | 17 | 31 | 45 | −14 | 22 | |
| 14 | GS Ashcroft Co-op | 30 | 4 | 11 | 15 | 29 | 47 | −18 | 19 | |
| 15 | Waterlows | 30 | 4 | 6 | 20 | 17 | 58 | −41 | 14 | Left the league |
| 16 | Brache Sparta (R) | 30 | 3 | 4 | 23 | 26 | 85 | −59 | 10 | Relegation to Division One |

Source: nonleaguematters
Rules for classification: 1) points; 2) goal difference; 3) number of goals scored.
(C) Champions; (P) Promoted; (R) Relegated

== Division One ==
South Midlands League Division One
- Season: 1984–85
- Champions: Milton Keynes Borough
- Promoted: Milton Keynes Borough; Langford; Cranfield United
- Relegated: None

The Division One featured 10 clubs which competed in the division last season, along with 4 new clubs:

- Walden Rangers, relegated from Premier Division
- Milton Keynes Borough, transferred from the Hellenic League Division One
- Milton Keynes United, joined from North Bucks League
- Ickleford, joined from North Herts League

=== League table ===
| Pos | Team | Pld | W | D | L | GF | GA | GD | Pts | Qualification |
|---|---|---|---|---|---|---|---|---|---|---|
| 1 | Milton Keynes Borough (C, P) | 26 | 18 | 6 | 2 | 56 | 22 | +34 | 42 | Promotion to Premier Division |
| 2 | Mowlem | 26 | 14 | 7 | 5 | 60 | 36 | +24 | 35 | Left the league |
| 3 | Langford (P) | 26 | 13 | 4 | 9 | 53 | 40 | +13 | 30 | Promotion to Premier Division |
| 4 | Welwyn Garden United | 26 | 12 | 5 | 9 | 65 | 46 | +19 | 29 | |
| 5 | Totternhoe | 26 | 12 | 4 | 10 | 45 | 37 | +8 | 28 | |
| 6 | Cranfield United (P) | 26 | 9 | 9 | 8 | 39 | 38 | +1 | 27 | Promotion to Premier Division |
| 7 | Electrolux | 26 | 11 | 5 | 10 | 43 | 45 | −2 | 27 | |
| 8 | Milton Keynes United | 26 | 7 | 9 | 10 | 34 | 54 | −20 | 23 | |
| 9 | Walden Rangers | 26 | 7 | 8 | 11 | 44 | 51 | −7 | 22 | |
| 10 | Biggleswade Town | 26 | 8 | 6 | 12 | 36 | 45 | −9 | 22 | |
| 11 | Pitstone & Ivinghoe | 26 | 7 | 8 | 11 | 32 | 46 | −14 | 22 | |
| 12 | Sandy Albion | 26 | 8 | 6 | 12 | 38 | 53 | −15 | 22 | |
| 13 | Harpenden Town | 26 | 5 | 8 | 13 | 43 | 57 | −14 | 18 | |
| 14 | Ickleford | 26 | 7 | 3 | 16 | 34 | 52 | −18 | 17 | |

Source: nonleaguematters
Rules for classification: 1) points; 2) goal difference; 3) number of goals scored.
(C) Champions; (P) Promoted
