= 1988–89 South Midlands League =

The 1988–89 South Midlands League season was 60th in the history of South Midlands League.

== Premier Division ==
South Midlands League Premier Division
- Season: 1988–89
- Champions: Langford
- Promoted: None
- Relegated: None

The Premier Division featured 15 clubs which competed in the division last season, along with 3 new clubs:

- Pitstone & Ivinghoe, promoted from last season's Division One
- Brache Sparta, promoted from last season's Division One
- Thame United, transferred from the Hellenic League Premier Division

=== League table ===
Pos	Team	Pld	W	D	L	GF	GA	GD	Pts	Qualification
1	Langford (C)	34	26	4	4	73	24	+49	82	
2	Thame United	34	23	6	5	81	32	+49	75	
3	Selby	34	19	9	6	70	38	+32	66	Left the league
4	Shillington	34	19	8	7	62	40	+22	65	
5	Hoddesdon Town	34	17	10	7	53	33	+20	61	
6	Welwyn Garden City	34	15	9	10	64	50	+14	54	
7	The 61 FC Luton	34	15	8	11	50	48	+2	53	
8	Pitstone & Ivinghoe	34	13	10	11	53	49	+4	49	
9	Totternhoe	34	13	9	12	49	46	+3	48	
10	Leighton Town	34	13	7	14	47	60	−13	46	
11	New Bradwell St. Peter	34	12	4	18	56	64	−8	40	
12	Pirton	34	10	10	14	41	52	−11	40	
13	Winslow United	34	9	8	17	46	72	−26	35	
14	Electrolux	34	9	5	20	35	67	−32	32	
15	Biggleswade Town	34	8	6	20	39	66	−27	30	
16	Brache Sparta	34	8	5	21	33	64	−31	29	
17	Shefford Town	34	7	5	22	49	68	−19	26	
18	Milton Keynes Borough	34	4	9	21	37	65	−28	21	

Source: nonleaguematters
Rules for classification: 1) points; 2) goal difference; 3) number of goals scored.
(C) Champions

== Division One ==
South Midlands League Division One
- Season: 1988–89
- Champions: Welwyn Garden United
- Promoted: Welwyn Garden United
- Relegated: None

The Division One featured 10 clubs which competed in the division last season, along with 2 new clubs:

- Cranfield United, relegated from Premier Division
- Tring Athletic

=== League table ===
Pos	Team	Pld	W	D	L	GF	GA	GD	Pts	Qualification
1	Welwyn Garden United (C, P)	22	16	2	4	62	22	+40	50	Promotion to Premier Division
2	Buckingham Athletic	22	15	5	2	58	30	+28	50	
3	Caddington	22	13	3	6	50	27	+23	42	
4	Ashcroft	22	12	1	9	42	39	+3	37	
5	Ickleford	22	8	5	9	30	39	−9	29	
6	Walden Rangers	22	7	7	8	32	33	−1	28	
7	Cranfield United	22	8	3	11	30	44	−14	27	
8	Delco Products	22	7	5	10	38	41	−3	26	
9	Tring Athletic	22	7	5	10	35	47	−12	26	
10	Sandy Albion	22	8	2	12	37	51	−14	26	
11	Stony Stratford Town	22	6	3	13	29	49	−20	21	
12	Harpenden Town	22	4	1	17	23	44	−21	13	

Source: nonleaguematters
Rules for classification: 1) points; 2) goal difference; 3) number of goals scored.
(C) Champions; (P) Promoted
