= 1989–90 South Midlands League =

The 1989–90 South Midlands League season was 61st in the history of South Midlands League.

== Premier Division ==
South Midlands League Premier Division
- Season: 1989–90
- Champions: Pitstone & Ivinghoe
- Promoted: None
- Relegated: Shefford Town

The Premier Division featured 17 clubs which competed in the division last season, along with 2 new clubs:

- Welwyn Garden United, promoted from last season's Division One
- Milton Keynes/Wolverton Town, relegated from Isthmian League Division Two North

=== League table ===
| Pos | Team | Pld | W | D | L | GF | GA | GD | Pts | Qualification |
|---|---|---|---|---|---|---|---|---|---|---|
| 1 | Pitstone & Ivinghoe (C) | 36 | 22 | 8 | 6 | 72 | 33 | +39 | 74 | |
| 2 | Thame United | 36 | 20 | 8 | 8 | 70 | 43 | +27 | 68 | |
| 3 | Leighton Town | 36 | 19 | 9 | 8 | 67 | 34 | +33 | 66 | |
| 4 | Hoddesdon Town | 36 | 18 | 10 | 8 | 74 | 41 | +33 | 64 | |
| 5 | Biggleswade Town | 36 | 20 | 4 | 12 | 64 | 42 | +22 | 64 | |
| 6 | Totternhoe | 36 | 18 | 9 | 9 | 72 | 47 | +25 | 63 | |
| 7 | Shillington | 36 | 17 | 7 | 12 | 59 | 43 | +16 | 58 | |
| 8 | Electrolux | 36 | 16 | 9 | 11 | 72 | 49 | +23 | 57 | |
| 9 | Milton Keynes/Wolverton Town | 36 | 16 | 7 | 13 | 67 | 55 | +12 | 55 | |
| 10 | Welwyn Garden City | 36 | 15 | 10 | 11 | 59 | 48 | +11 | 55 | |
| 11 | New Bradwell St. Peter | 36 | 13 | 7 | 16 | 57 | 57 | 0 | 46 | |
| 12 | Milton Keynes Borough | 36 | 14 | 3 | 19 | 51 | 66 | −15 | 45 | |
| 13 | Pirton | 36 | 13 | 5 | 18 | 44 | 48 | −4 | 44 | |
| 14 | Brache Sparta | 36 | 9 | 13 | 14 | 47 | 68 | −21 | 40 | |
| 15 | The 61 FC Luton | 36 | 9 | 10 | 17 | 53 | 72 | −19 | 37 | |
| 16 | Langford | 36 | 9 | 10 | 17 | 37 | 59 | −22 | 37 | |
| 17 | Winslow United | 36 | 10 | 7 | 19 | 53 | 92 | −39 | 37 | |
| 18 | Welwyn Garden United | 36 | 8 | 8 | 20 | 45 | 96 | −51 | 32 | Left the league |
| 19 | Shefford Town (R) | 36 | 2 | 4 | 30 | 34 | 104 | −70 | 10 | Relegation to Division One |

Source: nonleaguematters
Rules for classification: 1) points; 2) goal difference; 3) number of goals scored.
(C) Champions; (R) Relegated

== Division One ==
South Midlands League Division One
- Season: 1989–90
- Champions: Harpenden Town
- Promoted: Harpenden Town; Wingate
- Relegated: None

The Division One featured 11 clubs which competed in the division last season, along with 5 new clubs:

- Wingate, joined from Herts County League Premier Division
- Shenley & Loughton
- Bedford United
- Toddington Rovers
- Risborough Rangers

=== League table ===
| Pos | Team | Pld | W | D | L | GF | GA | GD | Pts | Qualification |
|---|---|---|---|---|---|---|---|---|---|---|
| 1 | Harpenden Town (C, P) | 30 | 21 | 7 | 2 | 74 | 19 | +55 | 70 | Promotion to Premier Division |
| 2 | Wingate (P) | 30 | 20 | 6 | 4 | 96 | 37 | +59 | 66 | Promotion to Premier Division |
| 3 | Caddington | 30 | 18 | 5 | 7 | 52 | 31 | +21 | 59 | |
| 4 | Buckingham Athletic | 30 | 16 | 3 | 11 | 59 | 38 | +21 | 51 | |
| 5 | Ashcroft | 30 | 13 | 7 | 10 | 55 | 49 | +6 | 46 | |
| 6 | Cranfield United | 30 | 13 | 6 | 11 | 53 | 46 | +7 | 45 | |
| 7 | Stony Stratford Town | 30 | 10 | 11 | 9 | 40 | 30 | +10 | 41 | |
| 8 | Shenley & Loughton | 30 | 11 | 8 | 11 | 38 | 49 | −11 | 41 | |
| 9 | Tring Athletic | 30 | 10 | 9 | 11 | 42 | 56 | −14 | 39 | |
| 10 | Bedford United | 30 | 11 | 4 | 15 | 49 | 57 | −8 | 37 | |
| 11 | Walden Rangers | 30 | 9 | 9 | 12 | 41 | 44 | −3 | 36 | |
| 12 | Toddington Rovers | 30 | 8 | 9 | 13 | 41 | 60 | −19 | 33 | |
| 13 | Delco Products | 30 | 8 | 7 | 15 | 46 | 55 | −9 | 31 | |
| 14 | Ickleford | 30 | 8 | 7 | 15 | 33 | 62 | −29 | 31 | |
| 15 | Risborough Rangers | 30 | 4 | 9 | 17 | 32 | 64 | −32 | 21 | |
| 16 | Sandy Albion | 30 | 4 | 5 | 21 | 41 | 95 | −54 | 17 | |

Source: nonleaguematters
Rules for classification: 1) points; 2) goal difference; 3) number of goals scored.
(C) Champions; (P) Promoted
