= 1987–88 South Midlands League =

The 1987–88 South Midlands League season was 59th in the history of South Midlands League.

== Premier Division ==
South Midlands League Premier Division
- Season: 1987–88
- Champions: Shillington
- Promoted: None
- Relegated: Cranfield United

The Premier Division featured 15 clubs which competed in the division last season, along with 2 new clubs, promoted from last season's Division One:

- Electrolux
- Biggleswade Town

=== League table ===
Pos	Team	Pld	W	D	L	GF	GA	GD	Pts	Qualification
1	Shillington (C)	32	21	7	4	48	17	+31	70	
2	Selby	32	21	6	5	74	35	+39	69	
3	Langford	32	21	3	8	58	26	+32	66	
4	Totternhoe	32	18	7	7	58	34	+24	61	
5	Hoddesdon Town	32	17	8	7	63	38	+25	59	
6	Leighton Town	32	16	5	11	58	38	+20	53	
7	The 61 FC Luton	32	13	9	10	54	40	+14	48	
8	Electrolux	32	13	6	13	42	37	+5	45	
9	Welwyn Garden City	32	12	9	11	49	44	+5	45	
10	Shefford Town	32	13	6	13	41	65	−24	45	
11	Milton Keynes Borough	32	10	8	14	40	55	−15	38	
12	New Bradwell St. Peter	32	8	5	19	40	59	−19	29	
12	Pirton	32	7	8	17	40	59	−19	29	
14	Winslow United	32	6	10	16	37	51	−14	28	
15	Biggleswade Town	32	4	14	14	35	58	−23	26	
16	Cranfield United (R)	32	5	8	19	31	62	−31	23	Relegation to Division One
17	Knebworth	32	6	3	23	32	82	−50	21	Left the league

Source: nonleaguematters
Rules for classification: 1) points; 2) goal difference; 3) number of goals scored.
(C) Champions; (R) Relegated

== Division One ==
South Midlands League Division One
- Season: 1987–88
- Champions: Pitstone & Ivinghoe
- Promoted: Pitstone & Ivinghoe; Brache Sparta
- Relegated: None

The Division One featured 11 clubs which competed in the division last season, along with 2 new clubs:

- Stony Stratford Town
- Delco Products

=== League table ===
Pos	Team	Pld	W	D	L	GF	GA	GD	Pts	Qualification
1	Pitstone & Ivinghoe (C, P)	24	19	2	3	67	23	+44	59	Promotion to Premier Division
2	Brache Sparta (P)	24	13	5	6	46	35	+11	44	Promotion to Premier Division
3	Caddington	24	13	4	7	46	30	+16	43	
4	Walden Rangers	24	12	7	5	45	33	+12	43	
5	Stony Stratford Town	24	12	6	6	43	32	+11	42	
6	Milton Keynes Town	24	9	6	9	34	30	+4	33	Left the league
7	Welwyn Garden United	24	9	5	10	41	40	+1	32	
8	GS Ashcroft Co-op	24	7	5	12	28	41	−13	26	
9	Buckingham Athletic	24	7	4	13	24	39	−15	25	
10	Sandy Albion	24	7	4	13	34	52	−18	25	
11	Harpenden Town	24	6	6	12	34	52	−18	24	
12	Delco Products	24	5	7	12	30	37	−7	22	
13	Ickleford	24	5	3	16	26	54	−28	18	

Source: nonleaguematters
Rules for classification: 1) points; 2) goal difference; 3) number of goals scored.
(C) Champions; (P) Promoted
