= 1995–96 South Midlands League =

The 1995–96 South Midlands League season was 67th in the history of South Midlands League.

== Premier Division ==
South Midlands League Premier Division
- Season: 1995–96
- Champions: Arlesey Town
- Promoted: None
- Relegated: None

The Premier Division featured 15 clubs which competed in the division last season, along with 2 new clubs, promoted from last season's Senior Division:

- London Colney
- Toddington Rovers

=== League table ===
Pos	Team	Pld	W	D	L	GF	GA	GD	Pts	Qualification
1	Arlesey Town (C)	32	24	2	6	64	27	+37	74	
2	Hatfield Town	32	22	5	5	79	31	+48	71	Left the league
3	London Colney	32	21	5	6	88	34	+54	68	
4	Brache Sparta	32	20	8	4	56	24	+32	68	
5	Toddington Rovers	32	14	9	9	50	45	+5	51	
6	Royston Town	32	13	11	8	48	36	+12	47 (Note: Royston Town deducted 3 points.)	
7	Hoddesdon Town	32	12	8	12	49	44	+5	44	
8	Milton Keynes	32	13	4	15	55	70	−15	43	
9	Potters Bar Town	32	11	9	12	56	63	−7	42	
10	Biggleswade Town	32	12	5	15	51	50	+1	41	
11	Welwyn Garden City	32	11	7	14	53	62	−9	40	
12	Langford	32	10	8	14	30	48	−18	38	
13	Buckingham Athletic	32	9	6	17	43	63	−20	33	
14	Harpenden Town	32	8	8	16	42	56	−14	32	
15	Dunstable United	32	6	7	19	33	71	−38	25	Left the league
16	Shillington	32	5	9	18	42	60	−18	24	Left the league
17	Letchworth	32	1	9	22	33	88	−55	12	

Source: nonleaguematters
Rules for classification: 1) points; 2) goal difference; 3) number of goals scored.
(C) Champions

== Senior Division ==
South Midlands League Senior Division
- Season: 1995–96
- Champions: Holmer Green
- Promoted: Bedford United
- Relegated: None

The Senior Division featured 11 clubs which competed in the division last season, along with 3 new clubs:

- Houghton Town, promoted from Division One
- Kent Athletic, promoted from Division One
- Holmer Green, joined from Chiltonian League

=== League table ===
Pos	Team	Pld	W	D	L	GF	GA	GD	Pts	Qualification
1	Holmer Green (C)	26	19	5	2	71	31	+40	62	
2	Leverstock Green	26	17	6	3	63	26	+37	57	
3	Bedford United (P)	26	16	3	7	57	32	+25	51	Promotion to Premier Division
4	New Bradwell St. Peter	26	14	5	7	69	43	+26	47	
5	Totternhoe	26	13	6	7	52	44	+8	45	
6	Tring Athletic	26	13	4	9	66	37	+29	43	
7	Houghton Town	26	9	8	9	40	33	+7	35	
8	Winslow United	26	7	8	11	43	57	−14	29	
9	Risborough Rangers	26	7	7	12	35	56	−21	28	
10	ACD Tridon	26	7	6	13	46	42	+4	27	
11	Ampthill Town	26	7	6	13	39	62	−23	27	
12	Stony Stratford Town	26	6	5	15	39	67	−28	23	
13	The 61 FC Luton	26	5	4	17	28	71	−43	19	
14	Kent Athletic	26	3	5	18	31	78	−47	14	

Source: nonleaguematters
Rules for classification: 1) points; 2) goal difference; 3) number of goals scored.
(C) Champions; (P) Promoted

== Division One ==
South Midlands League Division One
- Season: 1995–96
- Champions: Mercedes Benz
- Promoted: Mercedes Benz
- Relegated: None

The Division One featured 10 clubs which competed in the division last season, along with 7 new clubs:

- Pitstone & Ivinghoe, relegated from Senior Division
- Leighton Athletic
- Crawley Green Sports
- Bridger Packaging
- Buckingham United
- Old Dunstablians
- Old Bradwell United

=== League table ===
Pos	Team	Pld	W	D	L	GF	GA	GD	Pts	Qualification
1	Mercedes Benz (C, P)	32	21	7	4	69	25	+44	70	Promotion to Senior Division
2	De Havilland	32	21	6	5	86	44	+42	69	
3	Walden Rangers	32	21	5	6	72	41	+31	68	
4	Leighton Athletic	32	18	5	9	87	50	+37	59	
5	Crawley Green Sports	32	16	6	10	52	42	+10	54	
6	Bridger Packaging	32	14	8	10	77	57	+20	47 (Note: Bridger Packaging deducted 3 points.)	
7	Caddington	32	13	8	11	57	54	+3	47	
8	Bow Brickhill	32	13	6	13	46	55	−9	45	Left the league
9	Buckingham United	32	14	1	17	58	53	+5	43	
10	Emberton	32	10	11	11	58	55	+3	41	
11	Flamstead	32	9	13	10	47	55	−8	40	
12	Abbey National	32	11	5	16	53	70	−17	38	
13	Scot	32	9	10	13	50	63	−13	37	
14	Old Dunstablians	32	7	7	18	43	70	−27	28	
15	Pitstone & Ivinghoe	32	5	8	19	36	85	−49	23	
16	Old Bradwell United	32	5	8	19	63	93	−30	22 (Note: Old Bradwell United deducted 1 point.)	
17	Cranfield United	32	6	4	22	45	87	−42	22	Left the league

Source: nonleaguematters
Rules for classification: 1) points; 2) goal difference; 3) number of goals scored.
(C) Champions; (P) Promoted
