= 1986–87 South Midlands League =

The 1986–87 South Midlands League season was 58th in the history of South Midlands League.

== Premier Division ==
South Midlands League Premier Division
- Season: 1986–87
- Champions: Selby
- Promoted: None
- Relegated: None

The Premier Division featured 15 clubs which competed in the division last season, along with 1 new club, promoted from last season's Division One:

- Totternhoe

=== League table ===
| Pos | Team | Pld | W | D | L | GF | GA | GD | Pts | Qualification |
|---|---|---|---|---|---|---|---|---|---|---|
| 1 | Selby (C) | 30 | 21 | 4 | 5 | 67 | 29 | +38 | 67 | |
| 2 | Shillington | 30 | 19 | 6 | 5 | 53 | 25 | +28 | 63 | |
| 3 | Hoddesdon Town | 30 | 18 | 5 | 7 | 61 | 39 | +22 | 59 | |
| 4 | Milton Keynes Borough | 30 | 14 | 8 | 8 | 55 | 40 | +15 | 50 | |
| 5 | Winslow United | 30 | 13 | 10 | 7 | 56 | 38 | +18 | 49 | |
| 6 | Totternhoe | 30 | 15 | 4 | 11 | 45 | 36 | +9 | 49 | |
| 7 | The 61 FC Luton | 30 | 13 | 8 | 9 | 49 | 35 | +14 | 47 | |
| 8 | Pirton | 30 | 12 | 8 | 10 | 50 | 43 | +7 | 44 | |
| 9 | Leighton Town | 30 | 11 | 10 | 9 | 42 | 30 | +12 | 43 | |
| 10 | Welwyn Garden City | 30 | 9 | 10 | 11 | 43 | 48 | −5 | 37 | |
| 11 | Eaton Bray United | 30 | 10 | 5 | 15 | 33 | 56 | −23 | 35 | Left the league |
| 12 | Cranfield United | 30 | 9 | 4 | 17 | 35 | 52 | −17 | 31 | |
| 13 | Langford | 30 | 8 | 6 | 16 | 27 | 43 | −16 | 30 | |
| 14 | New Bradwell St. Peter | 30 | 5 | 11 | 14 | 29 | 51 | −22 | 26 | |
| 15 | Knebworth | 30 | 6 | 4 | 20 | 30 | 66 | −36 | 22 | |
| 16 | Shefford Town | 30 | 4 | 3 | 23 | 26 | 70 | −44 | 15 | |

Source: nonleaguematters
Rules for classification: 1) points; 2) goal difference; 3) number of goals scored.
(C) Champions

== Division One ==
South Midlands League Division One
- Season: 1986–87
- Champions: Electrolux
- Promoted: Electrolux; Biggleswade Town
- Relegated: None

The Division One featured 11 clubs which competed in the division last season, along with 3 new clubs:

- GS Ashcroft Co-op, relegated from Premier Division
- Caddington
- Milford Villa

=== League table ===
| Pos | Team | Pld | W | D | L | GF | GA | GD | Pts | Qualification |
|---|---|---|---|---|---|---|---|---|---|---|
| 1 | Electrolux (C, P) | 26 | 20 | 3 | 3 | 67 | 20 | +47 | 63 | Promotion to Premier Division |
| 2 | Biggleswade Town (P) | 26 | 14 | 6 | 6 | 49 | 30 | +19 | 48 | Promotion to Premier Division |
| 3 | Walden Rangers | 26 | 14 | 4 | 8 | 44 | 43 | +1 | 46 | |
| 4 | Caddington | 26 | 13 | 6 | 7 | 44 | 26 | +18 | 45 | |
| 5 | Pitstone & Ivinghoe | 26 | 14 | 3 | 9 | 39 | 36 | +3 | 45 | |
| 6 | GS Ashcroft Co-op | 26 | 12 | 7 | 7 | 49 | 40 | +9 | 43 | |
| 7 | Milton Keynes United | 26 | 9 | 7 | 10 | 40 | 37 | +3 | 34 | |
| 8 | Welwyn Garden United | 26 | 9 | 7 | 10 | 37 | 37 | 0 | 34 | |
| 9 | Brache Sparta | 26 | 9 | 4 | 13 | 31 | 37 | −6 | 31 | |
| 10 | Ickleford | 26 | 7 | 6 | 13 | 28 | 50 | −22 | 27 | |
| 11 | Buckingham Athletic | 26 | 8 | 2 | 16 | 30 | 47 | −17 | 26 | |
| 12 | Harpenden Town | 26 | 7 | 3 | 16 | 24 | 41 | −17 | 24 | |
| 13 | Sandy Albion | 26 | 6 | 6 | 14 | 37 | 57 | −20 | 24 | |
| 14 | Milford Villa | 26 | 4 | 8 | 14 | 26 | 44 | −18 | 20 | Left the league |

Source: nonleaguematters
Rules for classification: 1) points; 2) goal difference; 3) number of goals scored.
(C) Champions; (P) Promoted
