= 1990–91 South Midlands League =

The 1990–91 South Midlands League season was 62nd in the history of South Midlands League.

== Premier Division ==
South Midlands League Premier Division
- Season: 1990–91
- Champions: Thame United
- Promoted: Thame United
- Relegated: None

The Premier Division featured 17 clubs which competed in the division last season, along with 3 new clubs:

- Harpenden Town, promoted from last season's Division One
- Wingate, promoted from last season's Division One
- Letchworth Garden City, relegated from Isthmian League Division Two North

Also Milton Keynes/Wolverton Town changed their name to Wolverton.

=== League table ===
Pos	Team	Pld	W	D	L	GF	GA	GD	Pts	Qualification
1	Thame United (C, P)	38	25	5	8	76	28	+48	80	Promotion to Isthmian League Division Three
2	Wolverton	38	24	8	6	98	51	+47	80	
3	Biggleswade Town	38	22	9	7	77	43	+34	75	
4	Leighton Town	38	22	8	8	77	38	+39	74	
5	Shillington	38	21	10	7	77	40	+37	73	
6	Letchworth Garden City	38	19	10	9	65	45	+20	67	
7	Harpenden Town	38	19	8	11	64	53	+11	65	
8	Wingate	38	18	8	12	71	62	+9	62	Merged with Finchley to form Wingate & Finchley
9	Hoddesdon Town	38	16	8	14	74	60	+14	56	
10	Electrolux	38	13	16	9	50	38	+12	55	Left the league
11	Totternhoe	38	13	12	13	74	64	+10	51	
12	Welwyn Garden City	38	13	9	16	51	57	−6	48	
13	Langford	38	13	8	17	45	54	−9	47	
14	Pirton	38	12	9	17	56	54	+2	45	
15	The 61 FC Luton	38	11	5	22	54	84	−30	38	
16	Pitstone & Ivinghoe	38	10	3	25	43	77	−34	33	
17	New Bradwell St. Peter	38	9	6	23	42	87	−45	33	
18	Brache Sparta	38	8	7	23	37	84	−47	31	
19	Milton Keynes Borough	38	7	7	24	40	84	−44	28	
20	Winslow United	38	3	8	27	27	95	−68	17	

Source: nonleaguematters
Rules for classification: 1) points; 2) goal difference; 3) number of goals scored.
(C) Champions; (P) Promoted

== Division One ==
South Midlands League Division One
- Season: 1990–91
- Champions: Buckingham Athletic
- Promoted: Buckingham Athletic; Oxford City
- Relegated: None

The Division One featured 14 clubs which competed in the division last season, along with 4 new clubs:

- Shefford Town, relegated from Premier Division
- Oxford City
- Potters Bar Crusaders, joined from Herts County League Division One
- Flamstead

=== League table ===
Pos	Team	Pld	W	D	L	GF	GA	GD	Pts	Qualification
1	Buckingham Athletic (C, P)	34	25	7	2	99	26	+73	82	Promotion to Premier Division
2	Shenley & Loughton	34	25	3	6	101	42	+59	78	
3	Oxford City (P)	34	20	9	5	79	47	+32	69	Promotion to Premier Division
4	Potters Bar Crusaders	34	20	4	10	89	56	+33	64	
5	Ashcroft	34	17	12	5	77	39	+38	63	
6	Caddington	34	17	7	10	49	39	+10	58	
7	Delco Products	34	16	7	11	57	52	+5	55	
8	Flamstead	34	14	8	12	70	52	+18	50	
9	Walden Rangers	34	13	8	13	59	64	−5	47	
10	Bedford United	34	12	6	16	57	56	+1	42	
11	Ickleford	34	13	2	19	44	71	−27	41	
12	Tring Athletic	34	12	4	18	51	57	−6	40	
13	Shefford Town	34	11	6	17	40	64	−24	39	
14	Cranfield United	34	10	8	16	45	69	−24	38	
15	Toddington Rovers	34	7	9	18	39	61	−22	30	
16	Stony Stratford Town	34	8	4	22	44	84	−40	28	
17	Risborough Rangers	34	7	1	26	37	97	−60	22	
18	Sandy Albion	34	4	5	25	37	98	−61	17	

Source: nonleaguematters
Rules for classification: 1) points; 2) goal difference; 3) number of goals scored.
(C) Champions; (P) Promoted
