= 1985–86 South Midlands League =

The 1985–86 South Midlands League season was 57th in the history of South Midlands League.

== Premier Division ==
South Midlands League Premier Division
- Season: 1985–86
- Champions: Selby
- Promoted: None
- Relegated: GS Ashcroft Co-op

The Premier Division featured 13 clubs which competed in the division last season, along with 3 new clubs, promoted from last season's Division One:

- Milton Keynes Borough
- Langford
- Cranfield United

=== League table ===
Pos	Team	Pld	W	D	L	GF	GA	GD	Pts	Qualification
1	Selby (C)	30	18	7	5	59	25	+34	61	
2	Welwyn Garden City	30	16	9	5	47	24	+23	57	
3	Leighton Town	30	16	5	9	39	28	+11	53	
4	The 61 FC Luton	30	14	10	6	44	31	+13	52	
5	Shefford Town	30	12	12	6	47	31	+16	48	
6	Knebworth	30	12	12	6	38	29	+9	48	
7	New Bradwell St. Peter	30	11	10	9	35	29	+6	43	
8	Eaton Bray United	30	10	11	9	44	35	+9	41	
9	Hoddesdon Town	30	11	7	12	34	37	−3	40	
10	Milton Keynes Borough	30	9	8	13	42	50	−8	35	
11	Pirton Hearts	30	8	10	12	43	41	+2	34	
12	Winslow United	30	9	7	14	34	52	−18	34	
13	Shillington	30	6	12	12	37	38	−1	30	
14	Cranfield United	30	7	7	16	41	61	−20	28	
15	Langford	30	8	4	18	30	66	−36	28	
16	GS Ashcroft Co-op (R)	30	5	5	20	29	66	−37	20	Relegation to Division One

Source: nonleaguematters
Rules for classification: 1) points; 2) goal difference; 3) number of goals scored.
(C) Champions; (R) Relegated

== Division One ==
South Midlands League Division One
- Season: 1985–86
- Champions: Buckingham Athletic
- Promoted: Totternhoe
- Relegated: None

The Division One featured 10 clubs which competed in the division last season, along with 2 new clubs:

- Brache Sparta, relegated from Premier Division
- Buckingham Athletic, joined from North Bucks League

=== League table ===
Pos	Team	Pld	W	D	L	GF	GA	GD	Pts	Qualification
1	Buckingham Athletic (C)	22	14	5	3	53	20	+33	47	
2	Totternhoe (P)	22	14	5	3	44	21	+23	47	Promotion to Premier Division
3	Electrolux	22	11	8	3	58	23	+35	41	
4	Harpenden Town	22	12	2	8	44	36	+8	38	
5	Pitstone & Ivinghoe	22	10	7	5	41	20	+21	37	
6	Welwyn Garden United	22	8	9	5	31	28	+3	33	
7	Walden Rangers	22	6	7	9	31	38	−7	25	
8	Biggleswade Town	22	6	4	12	23	44	−21	22	
9	Brache Sparta	22	5	6	11	19	34	−15	21	
10	Sandy Albion	22	5	4	13	24	40	−16	19	
11	Ickleford	22	4	5	13	21	40	−19	17	
12	Milton Keynes United	22	4	4	14	18	63	−45	16	

Source: nonleaguematters
Rules for classification: 1) points; 2) goal difference; 3) number of goals scored.
(C) Champions; (P) Promoted
