= Bedfordshire Senior Cup =

Bedfordshire County FA Senior Cup
- Founded: 1894
- Region: Bedfordshire
- Teams: 12
- Current champions: Real Bedford (1)
- Most championships: Dunstable Town (12)

The Bedfordshire Senior Challenge Cup, also known as the Beds Senior Cup, is the county cup of Bedfordshire. According to the current rules of the competition, it is open to all clubs whose affiliation is with the Bedfordshire County FA (BCFA).

The current holders are Real Bedford who won the competition when it was last contested in the 2025–26 season in a 3–2 victory over Bedford Town in the final.

== History ==
The BCFA covers the ceremonial county of Bedfordshire. The Senior Challenge Cup was first contested in 1894 and was won by Luton Montrose FC.

== Winners ==
Season	Winners	Ref
1894–95	Luton Montrose	
1895–96	Dunstable Town	
1896–97	Luton Town	
1897–98	Luton Falcons	
1898–99	Luton Town	
1899–1900	Bedford Montrose	
1900–01	Luton Town	
1901–02	Luton Town	
1902–03	Biggleswade & District	
1903–04	Luton Town	
1904–05	Luton Clarence	
1905–06	Luton Town	
1906–07	Luton Clarence	
1907–08	Biggleswade & District	
1908–09	Kempston Rovers	
1909–10	Luton Clarence	
1910–11	Luton Clarence	
1911–12	Luton Clarence	
1912–13	Luton Crusaders	
1913–14	Luton Clarence	
1914–19	No Competition	
1919–20	Luton Clarence	
1920–21	Luton Clarence	
1921–22	RAF Henlow	
1922–23	Luton Amateur	
1923–24	Waterlows (Dunstable)	
1924–25	Waterlows (Dunstable)	
1925–26	Leagrave & District	
1926–27	Leighton United	
1927–28	Waterlows (Dunstable)	
1928–29	Waterlows (Dunstable)	
1929–30	RAF Henlow	
1930–31	RAF Henlow	
1931–32	Waterlows (Dunstable)	
1932–33	Waterlows (Dunstable)	
1933–34	Waterlows (Dunstable)	
1934–35	RAF Henlow	
1935–36	Waterlows (Dunstable)	
1936–37	Vauxhall Motors	
1937–38	Kempston Rovers	
1938–39	Waterlows (Dunstable)	
1939–40	Waterlows (Dunstable)	
1940–41	Queens Park Rangers Bedford	
1941–42	Bedford St Cuthberts	
1942–43	Queens Park Rangers Bedford	
1943–44	Luton Town Colts	
1944–45	No Competition	
1945–46	Vauxhall Motors	
1946–47	Biggleswade Town	
1947–48	Potton United	
1948–49	Potton United	
1949–50	Shefford Town	
1950–51	Bedford Corinthians	
1951–52	Biggleswade Town	
1952–53	Shefford Town	
1953–54	Vauxhall Motors	
1954–55	Shefford Town	
1955–56	Vauxhall Motors	
1956–57	Dunstable Town	
1957–58	Vauxhall Motors	
1958–59	Vauxhall Motors	
1959–60	Dunstable Town	
1960–61	Vauxhall Motors	
1961–62	Biggleswade Town	
1962–63	Biggleswade Town	
1963–64	Potton United	
1964–65	Stotfold	
1965–66	Arlesey Town	
1966–67	Biggleswade Town	
1967–68	Leighton Town	
1968–69	Leighton Town	
1969–70	Leighton Town	
1970–71	Wootton Blue Cross	
1971–72	Barton Rovers	
1972–73	Barton Rovers	
1973–74	Biggleswade Town	
1974–75	Vauxhall Motors	
1975–76	Potton United	
1976–77	Kempston Rovers	
1977–78	Potton United	
1978–79	Arlesey Town	
1979–80	Dunstable	
1980–81	Barton Rovers	
1981–82	Barton Rovers	
1982–83	Dunstable	
1983–84	61FC (Luton)	
1984–85	Eaton Bray United	
1985–86	Dunstable	
1986–87	Dunstable	
1987–88	Dunstable	
1988–89	Dunstable	
1989–90	Barton Rovers	
1990–91	Electrolux	
1991–92	Kempston Rovers	
1992–93	Leighton Town	
1993–94	Stotfold	
1994–95	Bedford Town	
1995–96	Bedford Town	
1996–97	Arlesey Town	
1997–98	Barton Rovers	
1998–99	Barton Rovers	
1999–2000	Stotfold	
2000–01	Wootton Blue Cross	
2001–02	Biggleswade United	
2002–03	Dunstable Town '98	
2003–04	Arlesey Town	
2004–05	Bedford Town	
2005–06	Biggleswade United	
2006–07	Dunstable Town	
2007–08	Stotfold	
2008–09	Dunstable Town	
2009–10	Arlesey Town	
2010–11	Arlesey Town	
2011–12	Luton Town	
2012–13	Biggleswade Town	
2013–14	Biggleswade Town	
2014–15	Barton Rovers	
2015–16	Barton Rovers	
2016–17	AFC Dunstable	
2017–18	Luton Town	
2018–19	Biggleswade Town	
2019–20	Not completed	
2020–21	Not held	
2021–22	Leighton Town	
2022–23	Luton Town	
2023–24	Biggleswade F.C.	
2024–25	AFC Dunstable	
2025–26	Real Bedford	

== Recent Finals ==
26 March 2018

Luton Town F.C.	4 – 3	Biggleswade F.C.

Kenilworth Road, Luton

27 March 2019

Biggleswade Town F.C.	3 – 0	Barton Rovers F.C.

The New Eyrie, Bedford

26 April 2022

Leighton Town F.C.	2 – 2	Bedford Town F.C.
Penalties
	5 – 3

Kenilworth Road, Luton
Attendance: 1,080

21 March 2023

Luton Town F.C.	6 – 2	Biggleswade F.C.

Kenilworth Road, Luton
Attendance: 751

9 April 2024

Biggleswade F.C.	1 – 0	A.F.C. Dunstable

Kenilworth Road, Luton
Attendance: 902

15 April 2025
19:45

Barton Rovers	2 - 3	AFC Dunstable

Kenilworth Road, Luton
Attendance: 1,355
Referee: Mario Stetakovic

24 July 2026
19:45

Bedford Town	2 - 3	Real Bedford
	Report

The Eyrie, Cardington
Attendance: 2,383
Referee: Mario Stetakovic

== Results by Team ==
Club	Wins	Years
Dunstable Town	12	1896, 1957, 1960, 1980, 1983, 1986–89, 2003, 2007, 2009
Biggleswade Town	11	1903, 1908, 1947, 1952, 1962–63, 1967, 1974, 2013–14, 2019
Luton Town	10	1897, 1899, 1901–02, 1904, 1906, 1944, 2012, 2018, 2023
Waterlows (Dunstable)	10	1924–25, 1928–29, 1932–34, 1936, 1939–40
Barton Rovers	9	1972–73, 1981–82, 1990, 1998–99, 2015–16
Luton Clarence	8	1905, 1907, 1910–12, 1914, 1920–21
Vauxhall Motors	8	1937, 1946, 1954, 1956, 1958–59, 1961, 1975
Arlesey Town	6	1966, 1979, 1997, 2004, 2010-11
Leighton Town	6	1927, 1968–70, 1993, 2022
Potton United	5	1948–49, 1964, 1976, 1978
Kempston Rovers	4	1909, 1938, 1977, 1992
RAF Henlow	4	1922, 1930–31, 1935
Stotfold	4	1965, 1994, 2000, 2008
Bedford Town	3	1995–96, 2005
Shefford Town	3	1950, 1953, 1955
AFC Dunstable	2	2017, 2025
Biggleswade United	2	2002, 2006
Queens Park Rangers Bedford	2	1941, 1943
Wootton Blue Cross	2	1971, 2001

Clubs with one win – Bedford Corinthians, Bedford Montrose, Bedford St Cuthberts, Biggleswade F.C., Eaton Bray United, Electrolux, Leagrave & District, Luton Amateur, Luton Crusaders, Luton Falcons, Luton Montrose, 61FC (Luton), Real Bedford.
