= 2009–10 FA Trophy =

FA Challenge Trophy

Tournament details
- Country: England; Wales
- Teams: 264

Final positions
- Champions: Barrow
- Runners-up: Stevenage Borough

Tournament statistics
- Matches played: 263

The FA Trophy 2009–10 is the 40th season of the FA Trophy, the Football Association's cup competition for teams at levels 5–8 of the English football league system. The number of team entries for this season was initially 265, but this was reduced to 264 when Newcastle Blue Star withdrew.

== Calendar ==
Round	Date	Matches	Clubs	New entries this round	Prize money
Preliminary round	3 October 2009	52	264 → 212	104	£2,000
First round qualifying	17 October 2009	72	212 → 140	92	£2,300
Second round qualifying	31 October 2009	36	140 → 104	none	£3,000
Third round qualifying	21 November 2009	40	104 → 64	44	£4,000
First round	12 December 2009	32	64 → 32	24	£5,000
Second round	9 January 2010	16	32 → 16	none	£6,000
Third round	30 January 2010	8	16 → 8	none	£7,000
Quarter-finals	20 February 2010	4	8 → 4	none	£8,000
Semi-finals	13 March and 20 March 2010	2	4 → 2	none	£16,000
Final	8 May 2010	1	2 → 1	none	Winners: £50,000; Runners-Up: £25,000

== Preliminary round ==
Ties will be played on 3 October 2009.

=== Ties ===
Tie	Home team	Score	Away team	Attendance
1	Colwyn Bay	0–2	Witton Albion	326
2	Woodley Sports	2–2	Harrogate Railway Athletic	81
3	Clitheroe	1–1	Belper Town	164
4	Mossley	5–2	Bedworth United	113
5	Curzon Ashton	1–2	Brigg Town	85
6	Warrington Town	5–2	Sheffield	142
7	Rossendale United	1–2	Chorley	139
8	Glapwell	2–2	Grantham Town	125
9	Radcliffe Borough	6–3	Mickleover Sports	111
10	Kidsgrove Athletic	0–1	Leek Town	285
11	Ossett Albion	2–3	Shepshed Dynamo	118
12	Cammell Laird	3–1	Stamford	91
13	Lincoln United	1–2	Chasetown	83
14	Market Drayton Town	1–1	Bamber Bridge	134
15	Prescot Cables	1–2	Lancaster City	198
16	Trafford	3–4	FC Halifax Town	298
17	Wakefield	1–1	Carlton Town	72
18	Potters Bar Town	0–0	Arlesey Town	95
19	Heybridge Swifts	0–3	VCD Athletic	149
20	Barton Rovers	1–1	Ilford	80
21	Leatherhead	3–3	Thamesmead Town	146
22	Chatham Town	1–4	Concord Rangers	159
23	Croydon Athletic	2–1	Bury Town	71
24	Burgess Hill Town	2–0	Dulwich Hamlet	173
25	Enfield Town	4–0	Eastbourne Town	224
26	Corinthian-Casuals	2–2	Worthing	121
27	Folkestone Invicta	0–1	Hitchin Town	255
28	Brentwood Town	3–0	Great Wakering Rovers	96
29	Whitstable Town	2–2	Walton & Hersham	154
30	Tilbury	1–2	Biggleswade Town	61
31	Waltham Forest	2–0	East Thurrock United	55
32	Walton Casuals	0–0	Whyteleafe	75
33	Romford	0–7	A.F.C. Sudbury	142
34	Soham Town Rangers	3–1	Cheshunt	103
35	Sittingbourne	1–1	Wingate & Finchley	104
36	Ramsgate	3–2	Leyton	133
37	Chipstead	3–1	Horsham YMCA	75
38	Metropolitan Police	1–0	Maldon Town	65
39	Lowestoft Town	4–1	Redbridge	642
40	Leighton Town	3–0	Harlow Town	108
41	Bedfont Green	1–2	Chesham United	144
42	North Leigh	2–3	Burnham	64
43	A.F.C. Totton	2–0	Andover	195
44	Beaconsfield SYCOB	2–1	Aylesbury United	109
45	Bishop's Cleeve	1–2	Yate Town	77
46	Stourport Swifts	0–1	Hungerford Town	92
47	Slough Town	1–1	Mangotsfield United	241
48	A.F.C. Hayes	1–4	Bridgwater Town	73
49	Godalming Town	3–1	VT	111
50	Fleet Town	2–0	Bromsgrove Rovers	124
51	Rothwell Town	0–1	Gosport Borough	100
52	Windsor & Eton	2–1	Paulton Rovers	139

=== Replays ===
Tie	Home team	Score	Away team	Attendance
2	Harrogate Railway Athletic	2–1	Woodley Sports	82
3	Belper Town	1–4	Clitheroe	152
8	Grantham Town	2–3	Glapwell	149
14	Bamber Bridge	4–0	Market Drayton Town	153
17	Carlton Town	2–2	Wakefield	81
	Carlton Town advance 3–1 on penalties			
18	Arlesey Town	3–2	Potters Bar Town	106
20	Ilford	2–3	Barton Rovers	71
21	Thamesmead Town	1–2	Leatherhead	81
26	Worthing	0–1	Corinthian-Casuals	163
29	Walton & Hersham	3–3	Whitstable Town	122
	Walton & Hersham advance 3–1 on penalties			
32	Whyteleafe	2–1	Walton Casuals	100
35	Wingate & Finchley	1–2	Sittingbourne	71
47	Mangotsfield United	0–1	Slough Town	149

== First round qualifying ==
Ties will be played on 17 October 2009.

Teams from Premier Division of Southern League, Northern Premier League and Isthmian League entered in this round.

=== Ties ===
Tie	Home team	Score	Away team	Attendance
1	Radcliffe Borough	3–6	Quorn	123
2	Spalding United	1–3	Mossley	92
3	Shepshed Dynamo	2–1	Harrogate Railway Athletic	156
4	North Ferriby United	1–1	Worksop Town	202
5	Boston United	3–2	Chorley	889
6	Cammell Laird	0–3	Guiseley	101
7	Retford United	0–1	Nantwich Town	222
8	Atherstone Town	1–3	Leigh Genesis	195
9	Whitby Town	5–2	Warrington Town	274
10	Brigg Town	3–2	Burscough	105
11	Leek Town	2–1	Kendal Town	316
12	Rushall Olympic	0–1	Carlton Town	90
13	Lancaster City	1–1	Chasetown	195
14	Skelmersdale United	5–0	Goole	203
15	Bradford Park Avenue	0–1	Clitheroe	310
16	Salford City	3–0	Durham City	103
17	Witton Albion	1–1	Sutton Coldfield Town	200
18	Garforth Town	0–3	AFC Fylde	135
19	Marine	0–1	King's Lynn	240
20	Nuneaton Town	1–1	Hucknall Town	660
21	FC Halifax Town	2–0	Romulus	936
22	Stocksbridge Park Steels	1–2	Glapwell	110
23	Matlock Town	2–1	Loughborough Dynamo	236
24	Ossett Town	1–2	Willenhall Town	91
25	Buxton	1–0	Hednesford Town	360
26	Frickley Athletic	2–1	Bamber Bridge	171
27	Ashton United	1–3	F.C. United of Manchester	729
28	Croydon Athletic	2–1	Ashford Town (Middx)	89
29	A.F.C. Hornchurch	2–1	Brentwood Town	235
30	Wealdstone	3–1	Margate	265
31	Aveley	2–5	Carshalton Athletic	117
32	Ramsgate	3–0	Leatherhead	198
33	Soham Town Rangers	2–2	Harrow Borough	125
34	Cray Wanderers	1–2	Burgess Hill Town	149
35	Corinthian-Casuals	0–3	Arlesey Town	80
36	Waltham Abbey	0–2	Boreham Wood	67
37	Metropolitan Police	0–1	Kingstonian	296
38	Biggleswade Town	2–2	Chipstead	117
39	A.F.C. Sudbury	3–3	Billericay Town	312
40	VCD Athletic	0–1	Concord Rangers	128
41	Horsham	4–4	Barton Rovers	234
42	Canvey Island	1–2	Hitchin Town	285
43	Tooting & Mitcham United	3–0	Walton & Hersham	233
44	Ware	1–3	Enfield Town	239
45	Bognor Regis Town	3–1	Ashford Town (Kent)	248
46	Sittingbourne	0–1	Dartford	473
47	Waltham Forest	1–1	Maidstone United	126
48	Leighton Town	0–3	Whyteleafe	116
49	Hastings United	1–6	Merstham	358
50	Sutton United	0–2	Tonbridge Angels	319
51	Hendon	2–0	Lowestoft Town	174
52	Cirencester Town	1–3	Godalming Town	136
53	Hemel Hempstead Town	0–1	Farnborough	316
54	Burnham	3–2	Cinderford Town	79
55	Beaconsfield SYCOB	1–4	Bashley	78
56	Swindon Supermarine	2–4	Fleet Town	107
57	Bracknell Town	1–8	Thatcham Town	95
58	Banbury United	2–2	Bridgwater Town	247
59	A.F.C. Totton	2–2	Woodford United	263
60	Didcot Town	0–1	Cambridge City	195
61	Northwood	1–0	Abingdon United	93
62	Yate Town	2–1	Bedford Town	138
63	Tiverton Town	0–4	Truro City	487
64	Leamington	1–2	Stourbridge	615
65	Merthyr Tydfil	0–0	Marlow	250
66	Hungerford Town	4–3	Taunton Town	122
67	Chippenham Town	3–1	Frome Town	431
68	Evesham United	1–1	Windsor & Eton	85
69	Rugby Town	0–1	Gosport Borough	184
70	Clevedon Town	2–4	Brackley Town	108
71	Uxbridge	1–1	Slough Town	217
72	Chesham United	2–2	Oxford City	306

=== Ties ===
Tie	Home team	Score	Away team	Attendance
4	Worksop Town	4–4 †	North Ferriby United	127
	North Ferriby United advance 5–4 on penalties			
13	Chasetown	1–4	Lancaster City	254
17	Sutton Coldfield Town	2–3	Witton Albion	103
20	Hucknall Town	0–3	Nuneaton Town	215
33	Harrow Borough	5–1	Soham Town Rangers	91
38	Chipstead	2–2	Biggleswade Town	77
	Chipstead advance 4–1 on penalties			
39	Billericay Town	2–2	A.F.C. Sudbury	252
	Billericay Town advance 5–3 on penalties			
41	Barton Rovers	4–3	Horsham	88
47	Maidstone United	1–0	Waltham Forest	152
58	Bridgwater Town	0–1	Banbury United	196
59	Woodford United	1–4	A.F.C. Totton	68
65	Marlow	4–2	Merthyr Tydfil	115
68	Windsor & Eton	0–2	Evesham United	104
71	Slough Town	2–0	Uxbridge	200
72	Oxford City	2–0	Chesham United	213

== Second round qualifying ==
Ties will be played on 31 October 2009.

=== Ties ===
Tie	Home team	Score	Away team	Attendance
1	Salford City	5–3	Clitheroe	143
2	Frickley Athletic	0–3	Guiseley A.F.C.	254
3	Boston United	0–0	Quorn	917
4	Willenhall Town	0–6	Nuneaton Town	335
5	AFC Fylde	2–1	Glapwell	217
6	Whitby Town	0–2	King's Lynn	251
7	Carlton Town	0–3	North Ferriby United	92
8	Witton Albion	4–1	Brigg Town	220
9	Nantwich Town	4–1	Leek Town	579
10	Cambridge City	0–1	Matlock Town	276
11	Shepshed Dynamo	0–5	FC Halifax Town	481
12	Lancaster City	3–3	F.C. United of Manchester	743
13	Leigh Genesis	4–1	Skelmersdale United	220
14	Brackley Town	1–1	Mossley	176
15	Buxton	0–1	Stourbridge	262
16	Boreham Wood	3–2	Slough Town	167
17	Hitchin Town	3–1	Gosport Borough	268
18	Concord Rangers	2–0	Enfield Town	198
19	Barton Rovers	2–2	Billericay Town	140
20	Dartford	3–0	Chipstead	1,002
21	Croydon Athletic	1–1	Burnham	130
22	Carshalton Athletic	3–1	A.F.C. Totton	249
23	Fleet Town	0–2	Ramsgate	118
24	Bashley	2–1	Marlow	211
25	Godalming Town	1–1	Banbury United	188
26	Kingstonian	4–2	Hendon	276
27	Farnborough	5–2	Burgess Hill Town	584
28	Tonbridge Angels	6–1	Merstham	386
29	Arlesey Town	2–1	Oxford City	170
30	Northwood	0–0	Evesham United	104
31	Harrow Borough	2–2	Wealdstone	513
32	Yate Town	1–1	Hungerford Town	135
33	Truro City	4–1	Thatcham Town	371
34	Bognor Regis Town	0–2	Maidstone United	252
35	Chippenham Town	4–1	Tooting & Mitcham United	429
36	Whyteleafe	1–1	A.F.C. Hornchurch	143

=== Ties ===
Tie	Home team	Score	Away team	Attendance
3	Quorn	3–2	Boston United	271
12	F.C. United of Manchester	1–0	Lancaster City	756
14	Mossley	3–1	Brackley Town	135
19	Billericay Town	3–0	Barton Rovers	207
21	Burnham	2–1	Croydon Athletic	83
25	Banbury United	1–3	Godalming Town	205
30	Evesham United	1–2	Northwood	98
31	Wealdstone	2–1	Harrow Borough	315
32	Hungerford Town	3–0	Yate Town	127
36	A.F.C. Hornchurch	4–0	Whyteleafe	154

== Third round qualifying ==
Ties will be played on 21 November 2009

Teams from Conference North and Conference South entered in this round.

=== Ties ===
Tie	Home team	Score	Away team	Attendance
1	King's Lynn	1–0	Salford City	889
2	Ilkeston Town	1–1	Mossley	274
3	Fleetwood Town	2–0	Northwich Victoria	847
4	F.C. United of Manchester	2–3	Harrogate Town	1,166
5	Farsley Celtic	5–2	Droylsden	220
6	Hyde United	3–3	Nuneaton Town	328
7	North Ferriby United	2–2	Gainsborough Trinity	176
8	Workington	1–1	Solihull Moors	188
9	Blyth Spartans	2–0	Stafford Rangers	442
10	Eastwood Town	0–3	Nantwich Town	312
11	Quorn	2–3	Vauxhall Motors	173
12	Leigh Genesis	0–1	Redditch United	283
13	Stalybridge Celtic	1–1	AFC Telford United	422
14	Stourbridge	0–0	Southport	319
15	Witton Albion	1–1	Matlock Town	254
16	Guiseley	3–1	FC Halifax Town	919
17	Corby Town	1–1	Alfreton Town	306
18	AFC Fylde	1–1	Hinckley United	224
19	Weston Super Mare	1–1	Carshalton Athletic	199
20	Bromley	0–1	Maidstone United	655
21	Billericay Town	0–0	Hitchin Town	327
22	Eastleigh	1–1	Lewes	261
23	Truro City	1–0	Gloucester City	217
24	Welling United	3–2	Tonbridge Angels	510
25	Bashley	2–1	Staines Town	268
26	Woking	6–0	St Albans City	823
27	Boreham Wood	1–0	Hungerford Town	89
28	Thurrock	1–4	Havant & Waterlooville	142
29	Maidenhead United	1–0	Bath City	272
30	Dover Athletic	3–2	Dartford	1,084
31	Godalming Town	0–3	Arlesey Town	145
32	Farnborough	3–0	Wealdstone	1,012
33	Chelmsford City	4–4	A.F.C. Hornchurch	635
34	Hampton & Richmond Borough	3–2	Concord Rangers	264
35	Worcester City	2–1	Burnham	377
36	Weymouth	3–0	Dorchester Town	1,032
37	Ramsgate	0–3	Bishop's Stortford	298
38	Newport County	2–1	Braintree Town	684
39	Kingstonian	0–2	Chippenham Town	388
40	Northwood	2–1	Basingstoke Town	178

=== Replays ===
Tie	Home team	Score	Away team	Attendance
2	Mossley	0–2	Ilkeston Town	183
6	Nuneaton Town	1–0	Hyde United	464
7	Gainsborough Trinity	3–3	North Ferriby United	226
	Gainsborough Trinity advance 3–2 on penalties			
8	Solihull Moors	2–4	Workington	117
13	AFC Telford United	1–2	Stalybridge Celtic	938
14	Southport	4–2	Stourbridge	268
15	Matlock Town	4–3	Witton Albion	256
17	Alfreton Town	1–2	Corby Town	268
18	Hinckley United	7–3	AFC Fylde	194
19	Carshalton Athletic	3–1	Weston Super Mare	214
21	Hitchin Town	0–1	Billericay Town	219
22	Lewes	1–0	Eastleigh	211
33	A.F.C. Hornchurch	1–2	Chelmsford City	370

== First round ==
This round is the first in which Conference Premier teams join those from lower reaches of the National League System. Matches took place on 12 December. Since King's Lynn folded, Vauxhall Motors received a walkover to the second round.

The fixture between Maidstone United and Histon was postponed in December due to a waterlogged pitch and rearranged for 15 December. This match, however, did not go ahead because of a frozen pitch and neither did the third attempt at playing this fixture on 22 December. The match was then scheduled to take place on 5 January, but this was also postponed due to bad weather. The match was then scheduled to take place on 12 January, but was subsequently postponed once more. The game was eventually played on 19 January, resulting in a 3–0 win for Histon. However, on 25 January, Maidstone were re-instated in the competition after Histon were found to have fielded an ineligible player.

=== Ties ===
Tie	Home team	Score	Away team	Attendance
1	Vauxhall Motors	w/o	King's Lynn	N/A
	Walkover for Vauxhall Motors – King's Lynn folded			
2	Mansfield Town	0–2	Tamworth	1,467
3	Gateshead	1–1	Harrogate Town	302
4	Corby Town	2–0	Farsley Celtic	242
5	Workington	2–1	Nuneaton Town	319
6	Guiseley	1–0	Redditch United	245
7	Hinckley United	0–0	York City	586
8	Wrexham	0–0	Altrincham	1,065
9	Kettering Town	0–1	Barrow	763
10	Chester City	0–1	Fleetwood Town	518
11	Matlock Town	0–2	Kidderminster Harriers	460
12	Nantwich Town	0–3	Stalybridge Celtic	581
13	Southport	2–2	Gainsborough Trinity	478
14	Blyth Spartans	2–0	Ilkeston Town	419
15	Welling United	0–1	Eastbourne Borough	437
16	Bishop's Stortford	1–2	Maidenhead United	245
17	Chelmsford City	2–2	Truro City	701
18	Stevenage Borough	2–0	Ebbsfleet United	809
19	AFC Wimbledon	2–1	Boreham Wood	1,306
20	Hampton & Richmond Borough	0–0	Lewes	256
21	Rushden & Diamonds	1–0	Billericay Town	696
22	Havant & Waterlooville	2–3	Dover Athletic	483
23	Bashley	2–3	Crawley Town	335
24	Arlesey Town	1–1	Chippenham Town	221
25	Oxford United	1–0	Hayes & Yeading United	1,803
26	Woking	1–0	Forest Green Rovers	956
27	Weymouth	0–1	Salisbury City	642
28	Farnborough	1–3	Newport County	805
29	Carshalton Athletic	1–1	Northwood	231
30	Cambridge United	3–1	Luton Town	1,665
31	Worcester City	3–1	Grays Athletic	545
32	Maidstone United	0–3	Histon	301
	Tie awarded to Maidstone United – Histon removed for fielding an ineligible player			

=== Replays ===
Tie	Home team	Score	Away team	Attendance
3	Harrogate Town	0–2	Gateshead	160
7	York City	3–1	Hinckley United	853
8	Altrincham	1–0	Wrexham	407
13	Gainsborough Trinity	1–0	Southport	218
17	Truro City	0–1	Chelmsford City	322
20	Lewes	3–1	Hampton & Richmond Borough	217
24	Chippenham Town	2–0	Arlesey Town	235
29	Northwood	0–5	Carshalton Athletic	142

== Second round ==
Matches were to take place on Saturday, 9 January 2010, but the bad weather that engulfed the country meant that all were postponed and rescheduled provisionally for between 11 and 13 January. Most of the games were further postponed to between 18 and 20 January.

=== Ties ===
Tie	Home team	Score	Away team	Attendance
1	AFC Wimbledon	3–1	Altrincham	1,450
2	Worcester City	1–1	Carshalton Athletic	468
3	Stevenage Borough	6–0	Vauxhall Motors	678
4	Blyth Spartans	1–2	Guiseley	350
5	Cambridge United	2–2	Eastbourne Borough	913
6	Gateshead	1–0	Chippenham Town	216
7	Oxford United	1–0	Woking	1,581
8	Stalybridge Celtic	1–2	Corby Town	253
9	Kidderminster Harriers	3–2	Lewes	654
10	Newport County	0–0	York City	1,040
11	Workington	2–1	Rushden & Diamonds	252
12	Chelmsford City	2–1	Crawley Town	715
13	Fleetwood Town	0–1	Dover Athletic	871
14	Gainsborough Trinity	0–0	Tamworth	291
15	Maidenhead United	0–1	Barrow	301
16	Salisbury City	2–0	Maidstone United	746

=== Replays ===
Tie	Home team	Score	Away team	Attendance
2	Carshalton Athletic	0–4	Worcester City	259
5	Eastbourne Borough	0–2	Cambridge United	525
10	York City	1–0	Newport County	1,378
14	Tamworth	2–1	Gainsborough Trinity	392

== Third round ==
Matches took place on 30 January 2010.

=== Ties ===
Tie	Home team	Score	Away team	Attendance
1	York City	1–0	Corby Town	2,205
2	Guiseley	0–1	Tamworth	281
3	Worcester City	0–1	Kidderminster Harriers	1,693
4	AFC Wimbledon	2–3	Workington	2,301
5	Cambridge United	0–0	Salisbury City	1,237
6	Stevenage Borough	4–1	Dover Athletic	1,203
7	Barrow	1–1	Gateshead	1,200
8	Chelmsford City	1–3	Oxford United	1,347

=== Ties ===
Tie	Home team	Score	Away team	Attendance
5	Salisbury City	2–1	Cambridge United	532
7	Gateshead	2–3	Barrow	312

== Fourth round ==
Matches took place on 20 February 2010. The match between Barrow and York City was postponed twice because of a frozen pitch.

Tie	Home team	Score	Away team	Attendance
1	Stevenage Borough	2–1	Workington	1,510
2	Salisbury City	2–1	Tamworth	1,012
3	Barrow	2–1	York City	1,525
4	Oxford United	1–2	Kidderminster Harriers	3,358

== Semi-finals ==
=== First leg ===
13 March 2010
15:00 (GMT)

Kidderminster Harriers	1–5	Stevenage Borough
Caines 29'	Report	Bridges 26', 43'; Odubade 38'; Beardsley 70', 83'

Aggborough, Kidderminster
Attendance: 2,433
Referee: Andy Woolmer

13 March 2010
15:00 (GMT)

Salisbury City	0–1	Barrow
	Report	Blundell 75'

Raymond McEnhill Stadium, Salisbury
Attendance: 1,782
Referee: Graham Horwood

=== Second leg ===
20 March 2010
15:00 (GMT)

Stevenage Borough	0–0	Kidderminster Harriers
	Report

Broadhall Way, Stevenage
Attendance: 1,622
Referee: Fred Graham

20 March 2010
15:00 (GMT)

Barrow	2–1	Salisbury City
Walker 51' (pen.), 89'	Report	Clarke 56'

Holker Street, Barrow-in-Furness
Attendance: 3,070
Referee: Andy Haines

== Final ==
8 May 2010
15:00 (GMT)

Barrow	2–1 (a.e.t.)	Stevenage Borough
McEvilly 79'; Walker 107'	Report	Drury 10'

Wembley Stadium, London
Attendance: 21,223
Referee: Lee Probert
