= South Midlands League =

Defunct association football league in England

- Founded: 1922
- First season: 1922–23
- Folded: 1997
- Country: England
- Divisions: 1–4
- Promotion to: Isthmian League
- Domestic cup(s): FA Cup, FA Vase
- Most championships: Barton Rovers (8)

The South Midlands League was a football league covering Bedfordshire and some adjoining counties in England. It was founded in 1922 as the Bedfordshire County League and merged with the Spartan League in 1997 to form the Spartan South Midlands League.

== History ==
The league was formed in 1922 as the Bedfordshire County League, beginning with eight clubs; Arlesey Town, Biggleswade & District Reserves, Leighton United, Letchworth Town, Luton Clarence Reserves, RAF Henlow, Stotfold Athletic and Waterlows Athletic. In 1924 the league was renamed the Bedfordshire & District County League. A second division was added in 1925, and in 1929 it was renamed the South Midlands League.

Division Two had only six clubs in 1930–31 and 1931–32, and was not played in 1932–33. However, it was reintroduced for the 1933–34 season with nine clubs, all but two of which were reserve teams.

The league was abandoned in 1939 due to World War II, before returning for the 1946–47 season. In 1947 Division One was renamed the Premier Division and Division Two became Division One, with a new third division added, named Division Two. The league gained another division in 1949 when Division Two was split into Division Two A and B, with a play-off between the two division winners to determine the overall Division Two champions. The following season Division Two reverted to being a single division.

Division Two was abolished in 1955 after having shrunk to only eight clubs in 1954–55. The league then remained unchanged until 1993 when Division One was renamed the Senior Division and a new division (Division One) added as a third tier. In 1997 the league merged with the Spartan League to form the Spartan South Midlands League. The new league initially ran with two Premier Divisions (north and south), a Senior Division and two Division Ones (north and south).

During the evolution of the National League System, the league became a feeder to the Isthmian League, with clubs such as Leighton Town, Oxford City and Bedford Town earning promotion.

Although clubs from the league played in the qualifying rounds of the FA Cup from the late 1920s onwards, none ever reached the first round proper. The best performance came from Barton Rovers in 1976–77 when they reached the fourth qualifying round. South Midlands League clubs had more success in the FA Vase, with Barton Rovers reaching the final in 1977–78 and Arlesey Town winning the competition in 1994–95.

== Divisional champions ==
Season	Champions			
1922–23	Waterlows Athletic			
1923–24	Biggleswade & District Reserves			
1924–25	Waterlows Athletic			
Season	Division One	Division Two		
1925–26	Waterlows Athletic	Waterlows Athletic Reserves		
1926–27	Leagrave & District	Batford Old Boys		
1927–28	Baldock Town	Leighton United		
1928–29	Luton Amateur & Ramblers	Luton Davis Athletic		
1929–30	Waterlows	Arlesey Town		
1930–31	RAF Henlow	Stevenage Town		
1931–32	Vauxhall Motors	Arlesey Town		
Season	Champions			
1932–33	St Neots & District			
Season	Division One	Division Two		
1933–34	Vauxhall Motors	Dunstable Athletic		
1934–35	Bedford Town Reserves	Stewartby Works		
1935–36	Kettering Town Reserves	Biscot Sports		
1936–37	Vauxhall Motors	Arlesey Town		
1937–38	Vauxhall Motors	Vauxhall Motors Reserves		
1938–39	Wolverton Town	Esavian Sports		
Competition abandoned due to World War II
1946–47	Luton Town Colts	Bedford St Cuthbert's		
Season	Premier Division	Division One	Division Two	
1947–48	Wootton Blue Cross	Peartree Old Boys	Baldock Town	
1948–49	Cambridge Town Reserves	Luton Hitchin Road Old Boys	Lynton Works	
Season	Premier Division	Division One	Division Two A	Division Two B
1949–50	Rushden Town Reserves	Baldock Town	Houghton Rangers (Note: Cranfield won the play-off, defeating Houghton Rangers 3–2 and 2–1 for a 5–3 aggregate win)	Cranfield United
Season	Premier Division	Division One	Division Two	
1950–51	Bletchley Town	Luton Kents Athletic	Vauxhall Motors 'A'	
1951–52	Arlesey Town	Bedford Town 'A'	Arlesey Town Reserves	
1952–53	Arlesey Town	Biggleswade Town Reserves	Luton Skefco Athletic	
1953–54	Shefford Town	Stotfold	Luton Davis Athletic	
1954–55	Shefford Town	Hunting Percival Athletic	Barton Rovers	
Season	Premier Division	Division One		
1955–56	Bletchley & WIPAC	Luton Town 'B'		
1956–57	Bletchley BBOB	Luton Town 'B'		
1957–58	Bletchley United	Peartree Old Boys		
1958–59	Luton Skefko Athletic	Stewartby Works		
1959–60	Ampthill Town	Sandy Albion		
1960–61	Hemel Hempstead United	Waterlows		
1961–62	Harpenden Town	Totternhoe		
1962–63	Electrolux	Addmult		
1963–64	Electrolux	Houghton Regis		
1964–65	Harpenden Town	Barton Rovers		
1965–66	Baldock Town	Esavian Sports		
1966–67	Leighton Town	Hanslope		
1967–68	Baldock Town	Rootes Sports		
1968–69	Addmult	Selby		
1969–70	Baldock Town	Welwyn Garden United		
1970–71	Barton Rovers	Towcester Town		
1971–72	Barton Rovers	Eaton Bray United		
1972–73	Barton Rovers	Pirton		
1973–74	Welwyn Garden City	Aspley Guise		
1974–75	Barton Rovers	Winslow United		
1975–76	Barton Rovers	BAC		
1976–77	Barton Rovers	New Bradwell St Peter		
1977–78	Barton Rovers	Royston Town		
1978–79	Barton Rovers	BAC		
1979–80	Pirton	Hatfield Town		
1980–81	Stotfold	The 61		
1981–82	Pirton	Welwyn Garden		
1982–83	Pirton	GS Ashcroft Co-Op		
1983–84	Shefford Town	New Bradwell St Peter		
1984–85	Eaton Bray United	Milton Keynes Borough		
1985–86	Selby	Buckingham Athletic		
1986–87	Selby	Electrolux		
1987–88	Shillington	Pitstone & Ivinghoe		
1988–89	Langford	Welwyn Garden United		
1989–90	Pitstone & Ivinghoe	Harpenden Town		
1990–91	Thame United	Buckingham Athletic		
1991–92	Leighton Town	Ashcroft		
1992–93	Oxford City	Bedford Town		
Season	Premier Division	Senior Division	Division One	
1993–94	Bedford Town	Toddington Rovers	Stony Stratford Town	
1994–95	Arlesey Town	London Colney	Houghton Town	
1995–96	Arlesey Town	Holmer Green	Mercedes-Benz	
1996–97	Potters Bar Town	Leverstock Green	Biggleswade United	

== Member teams ==
- AC Delco Reserves
- AC Sphinx
- AC Sphinx Reserves
- Abbey National
- ACD Tridon
- Addmult
- AML
- Ampthill Town
- Aspley Guise
- Arlesey Town
- Arlesey Town Reserves
- Ashcroft
- Bagshawes
- Baldock Town
- Baldock Town Reserves
- Barton Rovers
- Batford Old Boys
- Bedford Avenue Reserves
- Bedford Corinthians
- Bedford Eagles
- Bedford North End
- Bedford Queen's Works
- Bedford Queen's Works Reserves
- Bedford St Cuthbert's
- Bedford St. Cuthbert's Reserves
- Bedford Town
- Bedford Town 'A'
- Bedford Town Reserves
- Bedford United
- Bell Sports
- Biggleswade & District Reserves
- Biggleswade Town
- Biggleswade Town Reserves
- Biggleswade United
- Biscot Sports
- Bletchley Centre
- Bletchley LMS
- Bletchley Sports
- Bletchley Sports Reserves
- Bletchley Town
- Bletchley Town Reserves
- Bletchley United
- Bondor
- Borg Warner
- Bow Brickhill
- Brache Sparta
- Bridger Packaging
- Britannia Works
- British Aircraft Corporation (Luton)
- British Aircraft Corporation (Stevenage)
- Brooklands
- Buckingham Athletic
- Buckingham Town
- Buckingham United
- Caddington
- Cambridge Town Reserves
- Chipperfield
- Clifton Old Boys
- Cranfield United
- Cranfield United Reserves
- Crawley Green Sports
- De Havilland (Hatfield)
- Dunstable Athletic
- Dunstable Athletic Reserves
- Dunstable Town Reserves
- Dunstable United
- Eaton Bray
- Eaton Bray United
- Electrolux
- Elstow Abbey
- Emberton
- Esavian Sports
- Eynesbury Rovers
- Flamstead
- Flitwick Athletic
- Flitwick Rovers
- GIF (Luton)
- Hanslope
- Harlington Stars
- Harpenden Town
- Harrold United
- Hatfield Town
- Haynes
- Hemel Hempstead United
- Henlow
- Histon Institute Reserves
- Hitchin Blue Cross
- Hitchin Blue Cross Reserves
- Hitchin Imps
- Hitchin Town Reserves
- Hoddesdon Town
- Holmer Green
- Houghton Regis
- Houghton Town
- Hunting Athletic
- ICL Letchworth
- Ickleford
- Inter City
- Karrier Motors
- Kempston Rovers
- Kent Athletic
- Kettering Town Reserves
- Knebworth
- Kodak
- Kryn & Lahy
- Langford
- Leagrave & District
- Leagrave & District Reserves
- Leighton Athletic
- Leighton Marley
- Leighton Town
- Leighton United Reserves
- Letchworth
- Letchworth Town Reserves
- Leverstock Green
- Limbury Old Boys
- London Brick
- London Brick Reserves
- London Colney
- Lucas Sports
- Luton Amateur
- Luton Amateur Reserves
- Luton Amateurs & Ramblers
- Luton Amateurs & Ramblers Reserves
- Luton Athletic
- Luton Chapel Street Sports
- Luton Clarence
- Luton Clarence Reserves
- Luton Davis Athletic
- Luton Frickers Athletic
- Luton Gas Works Athletic
- Luton Hitchin Road Old Boys
- Luton Kent's Athletic
- Luton Kent's Athletic Reserves
- Luton Old Boys
- Luton Old Modernians
- Luton Percival Athletic
- Luton Ramblers
- Luton Town 'B'
- Luton Town Colts
- Lynton Works
- Marshmoor F.C.|Marshmoor
- Marston Shelton Rovers
- Marston Shelton Rovers Reserves
- Marston Sports
- Mercedes Benz
- Milford Villa
- Milton Keynes
- Milton Keynes Borough
- Milton Keynes County
- Milton Keynes Town
- Mowlem
- Mursley United
- Napier/English Electric
- New Bradwell St Peter
- Newport Pagnell Town
- Old Bradwell United
- Old Dunstablians
- Old Lutonians
- Oxford City
- Peartree Old Boys
- Peartree Old Boys Reserves
- Pirton
- Pitstone & Ivinghoe
- Potters Bar Crusaders
- Potters Bar Town
- Potton United
- Pye Radio
- RAF Cardington
- RAF Henlow
- RAF Henlow Reserves
- Risborough Rangers
- Roade
- Rootes Sports
- Royston Town
- Rushden Sports
- Rushden Town Reserves
- Sandy Albion
- Scot
- Selby
- Shefford Town
- Shenley & Loughton
- Shillington
- Shredded Wheat
- Shredded Wheat Reserves
- Silsoe
- SKF
- Slip End United
- St Neots & District
- St Neots & District Reserves
- St Neots St. Mary's
- Steeple Claydon
- Stevenage Town
- Stevenage Town Reserves
- Stewartby Works
- Stewartby Works Reserves
- Stony Stratford Sports
- Stony Stratford Town
- Stotfold
- Stotfold Athletic
- Stotfold Rovers
- Thame United
- The 61
- Tickford Sports
- Toddington Rovers
- Totternhoe
- Towcester Town
- Tring Athletic
- Vauxhall (Dunstable)
- Vauxhall Motors
- Vauxhall Motors 'A'
- Vauxhall Motors Reserves
- Waddesdon
- Walden Rangers
- Waterlows
- Waterlows Reserves
- Wellingborough Town Reserves
- Welwyn Garden City
- Welwyn Garden City Reserves
- Welwyn Garden United
- Westbourne Athletic
- Wiltonians
- Wingate & Finchley
- Wingate
- Winslow United
- Wolverton
- Wolverton Town Reserves
- Wootton Blue Cross
- Wootton Blue Cross Reserves
