= Daren Dykes =

English footballer (born 1981)

Personal information
- Full name: Daren Lewis Dykes
- Date of birth: 28 April 1981 (age 45)
- Place of birth: Aylesbury, England
- Positions: Midfielder; forward

Team information
- Current team: Kempston Rovers (First team coach)

Youth career
- 1997: Tottenham Hotspur
- 1997–1999: Leyton Orient

Senior career*
Years	Team	Apps	(Gls)
–2001	Newport Pagnell Town		
2000–2002	Buckingham Town		
2002–2003	Swindon Town	2	(0)
2002–2003	→ Lincoln City (loan)	3	(0)
2003–2004	Buckingham Town		
2005–2006	Stotfold		
2006–2008	Stony Stratford Town		(37)
2008–2009	Rugby Town	5	(0)
2008–2009	Halesowen Town		
2008–2009	Rugby Town		
2008–2009	→Buckingham Town (loan)		
2009–2013	Newport Pagnell Town		
- * Club domestic league appearances and goals

Daren Dykes (born 28 April 1981) is an English footballer. He played professionally as an attacking midfielder for Swindon Town and Lincoln City. He is first team coach at Kempston Rovers.

== Career ==
=== Early career ===
Dykes began his career on the books of Tottenham Hotspur as a schoolboy until he was 15 before joining the youth set-up at Leyton Orient where he remained until he was 17. He moved into non-league football with Newport Pagnell Town before joining Buckingham Town in January 2001.

=== League career ===
A series of impressive performances for Buckingham saw Dykes attract the attention of scouts from the Football League and in July 2002 joined Swindon Town initially on trial before agreeing a one-year contract. He made his Swindon debut as a substitute in the 2–1 defeat to Wycombe Wanderers in the Football League Cup on 11 September 2002 and made a further two appearances in the Football League Trophy before joining Lincoln City on loan in December 2002. He was immediately inserted into the first team, making his Football League debut as a substitute in the 1–1 away draw with York City on 20 December 2002. After starting Lincoln's next two games, he was dropped to the bench and his loan deal was not renewed. Returning to Swindon, Dykes made two further league appearances before being released at the end of the season.

=== Return to non-League football ===
Following his release by Swindon, Dykes had an unsuccessful trial with Maltese side Marsaxlokk before returning to Buckingham Town. He would make only five appearances, two in the United Counties League and three in the FA Cup, in his return to the club before suffering a serious cruciate ligament injury in the 2–0 FA Cup victory over Ford Sports Daventry on 30 August 2003. The injury would keep him out of action for over two years.

In November 2005 he made a return to the United Counties League, scoring on his debut for Stotfold in the 3–1 victory over St Ives Town on 22 November 2005. He joined Stony Stratford Town ahead of the 2006–2007 season. Playing in a more advanced role, he was a regular goalscorer for the club, netting a total of 22 goals in his first season, though only 10 of these came in the league. The following season saw him reach a total of 38 goals in all competitions, with 27 in the league.

In June 2008 he moved up the non-league pyramid joining Rugby Town, debuting in the 2–0 away defeat to Bedford Town on 25 August 2008. Rugby's manager Rod Brown moved to Bromsgrove Rovers at the beginning of September 2008 with Tony Dobson appointed in his place. Dykes quickly moved on from Rugby Town, linking up with his one-time Buckingham Town manager Morell Maison at Halesowen Town. His spell at Rugby comprised a total of seven games, five in the league, and two goals, both of which came in the 5–3 FA Cup 1st Qualifying Round Replay home victory over Friar Lane & Epworth on 16 September 2008. However, he made only a single appearance for Halesowen before returning to Rugby where injury restricted his outings and he temporarily linked up with former club Buckingham Town to gain fitness. He returned to Newport Pagnell Town at the start of the 2009–2010 season, scoring on his debut in the 1–1 home draw with Boston Town on 8 August 2009.

In November 2013, he was appointed assistant manager to his erstwhile forward partner Darren Lynch at Newport Pagnell Town, a role he held until family commitments resulted in his resignation in September 2016. On 16 December 2016, he was announced as the new first team coach of Kempston Rovers.
