= Bedfordshire County Football League =

Association football league in England

- Founded: 1904
- Country: England
- Divisions: 5
- Number of clubs: 77
- Level on pyramid: Level 11 (Premier Division)
- Feeder to: United Counties League; Spartan South Midlands League
- Promotion to: United Counties League Division One; Spartan South Midlands Division One
- Relegation to: Luton District & South Bedfordshire League
- Domestic cups: Britannia Cup; Centenary Cup; Jubilee Cup; Watson Shield
- Current champions: Caldecote (2025-26)
- Website: Official website

The Bedfordshire County Football League (formed as the Bedford & District League in 1904), is an English football competition for clubs in and close to the county of Bedfordshire. It runs with four divisions (five in the previous two seasons) and is headed by the Premier Division, which is at step 7 (or level 11) of the National League System. The top club in the league may apply for promotion to the United Counties League Division One or the Spartan South Midlands League Division One.

The league runs separate league cups for each division – the Premier Division clubs play for the Britannia Cup, Division One clubs play for the Centenary Cup, Division Two sides compete for the Jubilee Cup, while Division Three teams play in the Watson Shield.

The league is affiliated to the Bedfordshire County Football Association.

== Recent divisional Champions ==
The overall League Champions were awarded the Jubilee Challenge Cup until 1993, when that cup was retired and replaced by the Premier Cup.

| Season | Premier Division | Division One | Division Two | Division Three | Division Four | Division Five |
|---|---|---|---|---|---|---|
| 2000–01 | Caldecote | Campton | Cranfield United | North Park Rangers Reserves | Blunham Village | Bedford Sports Athletic Reserves |
| 2001–02 | Caldecote | Elstow Abbey | Golden Lion | Milton Keynes Wanderers | Oakley Sports Reserves | Westoning Reserves |

In 2002, Divisions Three, Four and Five were merged into two new divisions, Associate Division One and Associate Division Two

| Season | Premier Division | Division One | Division Two | Associate D1 | Associate D2 |
|---|---|---|---|---|---|
| 2002–03 | North Park Rangers | Golden Lion | Flitwick Town | Dunton Reserves | Meltis Sports |
| 2003–04 | Elstow Abbey | Turvey | Biggleswade United 'A' | Elstow Abbey Reserves | Ickwell & Old Warden Reserves |
| 2004–05 | Caldecote | Three Horseshoes Renhold | Denbigh Hall S&S Bletchley | Bedford Sports Athletic Reserves | Woburn Reserves |
| 2005–06 | Caldecote | Henlow | Marston Social | Caldecote Reserves | Exel United |

After the 2005–06 season, the league changed its name to the Bedfordshire Football League. Along with the name change, the league reorganised its five divisions by incorporating the two primarily reserve divisions (Associate Division One and Two) into the three first team divisions, ultimately creating three divisions of 16 clubs and a bottom division of 17 clubs.

| Season | Premier Division | Division One | Division Two | Division Three |
|---|---|---|---|---|
| 2006–07 | Westoning Recreation Club | Meltis Corinthians | Westoning Recreation Club Reserves | Ickwell & Old Warden Reserves |
| 2007–08 | Campton | Bedford Sports Athletic | Bedford College | Kings |
| 2008–09 | Caldecote | Westoning Recreation Club | Blunham Reserves | Leighton United |

The league reorganised itself again in 2009, extending its name to Bedfordshire County Football League and adding a fifth division, Division Four. The Premier Division now included 16 clubs, while 14 teams competed Divisions One, Two and Three and the new Division Four comprised 13 clubs.

| Season | Premier Division | Division One | Division Two | Division Three | Division Four |
|---|---|---|---|---|---|
| 2009–10 | Blunham | Flitwick Town | Potton Wanderers | Queens Park Crescents | Sharnbrook Reserves |
| 2010–11 | Blunham | Bedford Hatters | Lea Sports PSG | Sharnbrook Reserves | AFC Turvey |
| 2011–12 | Shefford Town & Campton | Ickwell & Old Warden | Elstow Abbey | Cranfield United Reserves | Bedford Park Rangers |
| 2012–13 | Caldecote | Leighton United | Goldington | Westoning Reserves | Bedford Panthers |
| 2013–14 | AFC Oakley Sports M&DH | AFC Turvey | AFC Oakley Sports M&DH Reserves | Meltis Albion | Meltis Albion Reserves |

The league crowned only four divisional champions in 2015, returning to five division for the 2015–16 season.

| Season | Premier Division | Division One | Division Two | Division Three |
|---|---|---|---|---|
| 2014–15 | Renhold United | Cranfield United | Stevington | Cranfield United Reserves |

| Season | Premier Division | Division One | Division Two | Division Three | Division Four |
|---|---|---|---|---|---|
| 2015–16 | AFC Oakley M&DH | Sundon Park Rangers | Clapham Sports | Wixams | Mid Bedfordshire Tigers |
| 2016–17 | Flitwick Town | Queens Park Crescents | Riseley Sports | Renhold United Reserves | CS Rovers |

| Season | Premier Division | Division One | Division Two | Division Three |
|---|---|---|---|---|
| 2017–18 | Shefford Town & Campton | Totternhoe Reserves | Bedford Albion | Kempston Athletic |
| 2018–19 | Shefford Town & Campton | Biggleswade Reserves | Elstow Abbey | Pines (Luton) |

| Season | Premier Division | Division One | Division Two | Division Three | Division Four |
|---|---|---|---|---|---|
| 2019–20 | Void | Void | Void | Void | Void |
| 2020–21 | Queens Park Crescents | Unknown | Harlington Juniors | St Johns (Luton) | Sharnbrook Reserves |
| 2021–22 | Biggleswade Reserves | Stotfold Development | Clifton | Wootton Blue Cross Reserves | Lea Sports PSG Saturday Reserves |
| 2022–23 | Elstow Abbey | Totternhoe Reserves | Harlington Juniors | Ickwell & Old Warden | Luton Panthers |

| Season | Premier Division | Division One | Division Two North | Division Two South | Division Three | Division Four |
|---|---|---|---|---|---|---|
| 2023–24 | Caldecote | Totternhoe Reserves | Ickwell & Old Warden | Stopsley United | Caldecote 'A' | Kemspton Athletic |
| 2024–25 | AFC Oakley | Harlington Juniors | Thurleigh | LU Donz | Kempston Athletic | Ampthill Town Colts |

| Season | Premier Division | Division One | Division Two | Division Three | Division Four |
|---|---|---|---|---|---|
| 2025–26 | Caldecote | Baldock Victoria | AFC Bedford United | Dunstable Wanderers | Dunstable Town Cricket Club |

== Member Clubs (2026–27) ==
=== Premier Division ===
- AFC Oakley
- Baldock Victoria
- Biggleswade United Reserves
- Caldecote
- Cranfield United Reserves
- Elstow Abbey
- Harlington Juniors
- Marston Shelton Rovers
- Queens Park Crescents
- Riseley Sports F.C
- Shefford Town & Campton
- Stewkley
- Stopsley United
- Thurleigh
- Wootton Blue Cross

=== Division One ===
- AFC Bedford United
- AFC Oakley Development
- Bedford Albion
- Biggleswade Reserves
- Blunham
- Clifton
- FC Haynes
- Flitwick Town
- Kempston United
- Lea Sports PSG
- LU Donz
- Queens Park Crescents Reserves
- Shefford Town & Campton Reserves
- St Josephs
- Totternhoe Reserves

=== Division Two ===
- Ampthill Town Colts
- Bedford Albion Development
- Bedford SA
- Bletchley Scot
- Caddington Reserves
- Caldecote Reserves
- Dunstable Wanderers
- Flitwick Town Reserves
- Green End Rovers
- Kempston Athletic
- Real Bedford Wixams
- Sandy
- Stotfold Juniors
- Wootton Blue Cross Reserves

=== Division Three ===
- AFC Kempston Town Hammers
- Atletic
- Caldecote 'A'
- Cranfield United Development
- Dunstable Town Cricket Club
- Everton Athletic
- Flitwick Town 'A'
- Luton Phoenix
- LU Donz Development
- M&DH Clapham Sports
- Ollie United
- Stopsley United Reserves
- The 61 Reserves
- Westoning Club Reds
- Wilstead

=== Division Four ===
- AFC Clophill
- Buffs United
- Catsbrook Wanderers
- Flitwick Eagles Development
- Henlow Hurricanes Reserves
- Kempston United F.C. Reserves
- Leighton Woodside Athletic
- Meltis Rangers
- Queens Park Crescents Development
- Sandy Reserves
- Turvey
- Wootton Blue Cross 'A'

== Other Bedfordshire Leagues ==
Main index: Affiliated Leagues in Bedfordshire
There are a number of other leagues that are affiliated to the Bedfordshire County Football Association.
