= Electrolux F.C. =

Electrolux
- Full name: Electrolux Football Club
- Founded: 1928
- Dissolved: 1991
- Ground: Ely Way, Luton
- Chairman: Stan Eaton
- Manager: John Alder
- Final season; 1990–91: South Midlands League Premier Division, 10th of 20
Home colours

Electrolux Football Club was a football club based in Luton, England.

== History ==
Founded in 1928, as a works team for Luton-based employees of Swedish company Electrolux, the club competed in local junior leagues during the first 21 years of their existence, before joining the South Midlands League in 1949. In 1955, the club were promoted to the Premier Division, being relegated back into Division One three years later. In 1963, Electrolux won the South Midlands League, following promotion back to the Premier Division three years prior. Electrolux retained the South Midlands League in 1964. The club yo-yoed between the Premier Division and Division One, entering the FA Vase for the first time in the 1987–88 season, playing in the competition for the final four seasons of the club's existence. The club folded at the end of the 1990–91 season, after being "forced to disband" according to chairman Stan Eaton.

== Colours ==
The club wore sky blue shirts and navy blue shorts and socks.

== Ground ==
Electrolux played at Ely Way in Luton, near the company's base in the town. Following Electolux folding, Luton Town began using the site for youth games.

== Records ==
- Best FA Vase performance: Preliminary round, 1987–88
