= Waterlows F.C. =

Waterlows
- Full name: Waterlows Football Club
- Founded: 1913
- Dissolved: 1985
- Ground: French's Avenue, Dunstable
- Final season; 1984–85: South Midlands League Premier Division, 15th of 16

Waterlows Football Club was a football club based in Dunstable, England.

== History ==
Founded in 1913, Waterlows was formed as a works team for the employees of the printing company Waterlow and Sons. A few years after Waterlows' formation, also known as Waterlows Athletic, the club joined the Bedfordshire County League. They won the league in 1923 and twice more in 1925 and 1926, once it had changed names to the Bedfordshire & District County League. Waterlows entered the FA Cup for the first time for the 1926–27 season and progressed to the Northamptonshire League for three seasons, before returning to the South Midlands League.

In 1930 Waterlows won the South Midlands League once again before moving upwards to the stronger Spartan League and finished third in Division One in that first season. They won Division One in 1932/33 and were promoted to the Premier Division which they won in 1936 and 1938. During the club's heyday in the 1920s and 1930s, Waterlows won the Bedfordshire Senior Cup ten times, but only once did they progress to the 1st round proper of the FA Amateur Cup, when in 1937/38 they were narrowly defeated 3–2 by Kingstonian of the Isthmian League.

In 1946, Waterlows rejoined the South Midlands League, winning promotion to the Premier Division in 1956. In 1971, Waterlows left the South Midlands League, rejoining in 1977, winning promotion back into the Premier Division at their first season back in the league. In 1985, Waterlows left the South Midlands League for the final time.

== Ground ==
Waterlows played at French's Avenue in Dunstable.

== Records ==
- Beds Senior Cup winners – 1924, 1925, 1928, 1929, 1932, 1933, 1934, 1936, 1939 and 1940
- Beds County League winners – 1923
- Beds & District County League winners – 1925 and 1926
- South Midlands League Division One winners – 1930 and 1961
- Spartan League Premier Division winners – 1936 and 1938
- Spartan League Division One winners – 1933
- Best FA Cup performance: fourth qualifying round, 1926–27
- Best FA Amateur Cup performance: first round proper 1937–38
- Best FA Vase performance: first round, 1982–83
