= Barton Rovers F.C. =

Association football club in England

Coordinates: 51.9637°N 0.4302°W

Barton Rovers
- Full name: Barton Rovers Football Club
- Nickname: The Rovers
- Founded: 1898
- Ground: Sharpenhoe Road, Barton-le-Clay
- Capacity: 4,000 (160 seated)
- Chairman: Darren Whiley
- Manager: Chris Robson
- League: Southern League Division One Central
- 2025–26: Southern League Division One Central, 9th of 22
- Website: bartonrovers.com
| Home colours | Away colours |

Barton Rovers Football Club is a semi-professional football club based in Barton-le-Clay, Bedfordshire, England. The club are currently members of the Southern League Division One Central and play at Sharpenhoe Road. They are affiliated to the Bedfordshire Football Association.

== History ==
The club was established in 1898, and played in village football until World War II. After the war the club joined the Luton & District League for the 1946–47 season, where they played until joining Division Two of the South Midlands League in 1954. They won Division Two at the first attempt, earning promotion to Division One. The following season saw them finish as runners-up in Division One, resulting in promotion to the Premier Division. In 1962–63 the club finished bottom of the division and were relegated back to Division One. However, they returned to the Premier Division two seasons later after winning the Division One title in 1964–65.

This saw the start of a decade-long spell of success for Barton Rovers; their first five seasons back in the Premier Division saw them finish third on four occasions and runners-up once. They then went on to win three successive titles between 1970–71 and 1972–73, and after a third-place finish in 1973–74, they won five consecutive titles. The club also saw success in the FA Vase; in 1975–76 they reached the quarter-finals, and the following season saw them reach the semi-finals, where they lost 3–1 to Sheffield. They went one better in 1977–78, reaching the final, where they lost 2–1 to Blue Star.

Barton Rovers moved up to Division Two of the Isthmian League in 1979. The 1980–81 season saw them reach the first round of the FA Cup for the first time, eventually losing 2–0 at Torquay United. The following season they reached the semi-finals of the FA Vase again, losing 2–1 to Rainworth Miners Welfare. League restructuring saw the club moved into Division Two North in 1984, before Division Two was restored in 1991.

After finishing as runners-up in 1994–95, Barton were promoted to Division One, where they remained until finishing bottom of the division in 2000–01. After returning to Division Two, league restructuring saw them placed in Division One North in 2002, before they were transferred to the Eastern Division of the Southern League in 2004. More restructuring saw them join Division One Midlands in 2006 and Division One Central in 2010. In 2014–15 the club finished fifth, qualifying for the promotion play-offs. However, after beating Royston Town 5–4 on penalties in the semi-finals following a 0–0 draw, they lost 2–0 to Bedworth United in the final. The 2016–17 season saw the club finish third; in the subsequent play-offs they beat Marlow 2–0 in the semi-finals before losing 2–0 to Farnborough in the final.

== Ground ==
Barton Rovers play their home matches at Sharpenhoe Road in Barton-le-Clay. The ground has a capacity of 4,000, of which 160 is seated and 1,120 is covered. All 160 seats are in the main stand, opposite which is a covered terraced that runs the length of the pitch. A new "Gorgeous George Stand" was built in 2024.

Sharpenhoe Road is also home to Luton Town Ladies.

== Honours ==
- South Midlands League
  - Premier Division champions 1970–71, 1971–72, 1972–73, 1974–75, 1975–76, 1976–77, 1977–78, 1978–79
  - Division One champions 1964–65
  - Division Two champions 1954–55
- Bedfordshire Senior Cup
  - Winners 1971–72, 1972–73, 1980–81, 1981–82, 1989–90, 1997–98, 1998–99, 2014–15, 2015–16
- Bedfordshire Intermediate Cup
  - Winners 1953–54

== Records ==
- Highest league position: Third in Southern League Division One Central, 2016–17
- Best FA Cup performance: First round, 1980–81
- Best FA Trophy performance: Third round, 2000–01
- Best FA Vase performance: Finalists, 1977–78
- Record attendance: 1,900 vs Nuneaton Borough, FA Cup fourth qualifying round, 1976
- Most appearances: Tony McNally, 598 (1988–2005)
- Most goals: Richard Camp, 152 (1989–1998)
- Record transfer fee received: £2,000 from AFC Wimbledon for Paul Barnes
- Record transfer fee paid: £1,000 to Hitchin Town for Bill Baldry, 1980

== See also ==
- Barton Rovers F.C. players
- Barton Rovers F.C. managers
