= Arlesey Town F.C. =

Association football club in England

Coordinates: 52°0′4″N 0°15′53″W

Arlesey Town
- Full name: Arlesey Town Football Club
- Nickname: The Blues
- Founded: 1891
- Ground: New Lamb Meadow, Arlesey
- Capacity: 2,920 (150 seated)
- Manager: Darren Ward
- League: Spartan South Midlands League Premier Division
- 2025–26: Spartan South Midlands League Premier Division, 10th of 20
- Website: arleseytownfc.co.uk
Home colours	Away colours

Arlesey Town Football Club is a football club based in Arlesey, Bedfordshire, England. Affiliated to the Bedfordshire County Football Association, they are currently members of the Spartan South Midlands League Premier Division and play at New Lamb Meadow.

== History ==
The club was established in 1891. They initially played in the Biggleswade & District League, before joining the Bedfordshire County League in 1922. They were runners-up in the league's first season, and runners-up in the subsidiary competition in 1923–24. After finishing bottom of Division One in 1925–26, they left the league before returning to Division One for the 1927–28 season. Although they left again after finishing bottom of Division One, the club rejoined the league in 1929, this time in Division Two. The club rejoined the (renamed) South Midlands League in Division Two in 1929–30, winning the Division at the first attempt and earning promotion to Division One. However, they were relegated back to Division Two at the end of the following season.

Arlesey won the Division Two title in 1931–32, but were not promoted and Division Two was not played the following season. They returned in 1936, winning a third Division Two title in 1936–37, resulting in promotion to Division One. Division One became the Premier Division in 1947. The club were Premier Division runners-up in 1950–51 and won the division the following season. They retained the league title in 1952–53, but left to join the Parthenon League in 1954, where they played for four seasons. In 1958 they switched to the Senior Division of the London League. After leaving the London League in 1960, the club returned to Division One of the South Midlands League in 1961.

Despite finishing in the bottom three of Division One in 1961–62, Arlesey were promoted to the Premier Division. They finished second-from-bottom of the Premier Division the following season and were relegated back to Division One. However, a third-place finish in 1963–64 resulted in an immediate return to the Premier Division. In 1982–83 the club transferred to the Premier Division of the United Counties League, which they won in 1984–85. However, rising costs forced the club to resign from the United Counties League in 1992, moving back to the Premier Division of the South Midlands League in 1991–92. The 1994–95 season saw the club win the Premier Division with a record 107 points, as well as beating Oxford City 2–1 in the final of the FA Vase at Wembley Stadium. Following the merger of the South Midlands League with the Spartan League to form the Spartan South Midlands League, the club were placed in the Premier Division North, and following league reorganisation at the end of the season, became members of the Premier Division for the 1998–99 season.

In 1999–2000 Arlesey won the Spartan South Midlands League Premier Division, earning promotion to Division Three of the Isthmian League. Their first season in the new division saw them win the title scoring an Isthmian League record 138 goals with a record 100+ goal difference, earning promotion to Division Two. In 2002 league reorganisation saw them placed in Division One North. They were transferred to the Eastern Division of the Southern League in 2004, before being moved back to Division One North of the Isthmian League in 2006. Another move in 2008 led to the club playing in Division One Midlands of the Southern League, which became Division One Central in 2010. The 2010–11 season saw the club win Division One Central, earning promotion to the Premier Division.

In 2011–12 Arlesey reached the first round proper of the FA Cup for the first time, where they lost 3–1 at Salisbury City. They repeated the feat the following season, losing 3–0 to Coventry City at the Ricoh Arena. The club were relegated back to Division One Central at the end of the 2014–15 season after finishing second-from-bottom of the Premier Division. In 2017–18 they finished bottom of the renamed Division One East, and were relegated to the Premier Division of the Spartan South Midlands League.

== Ground ==
The club plays at New Lamb Meadow. The ground has a capacity of 2,920, of which 150 is seated and 600 covered.

== Honours ==
- FA Vase
  - Winners 1994–95
- Isthmian League
  - Division Three champions 2000–01
- Southern League
  - Division One Central champions 2010–11
  - League Cup winners 2012–13
- United Counties League
  - Premier Division champions 1984–85
  - Premier Division Cup winners 1987–88
- Spartan South Midlands League
  - Premier Division champions 1999–2000
- South Midlands League
  - Premier Division champions 1951–52, 1952–53, 1994–95, 1995–96,
  - Division Two champions 1929–30, 1931–32, 1935–36
  - Challenge Trophy winners 1979–80
  - Premier Shield winners 1964–65
  - Premier Division Cup winners 1993–94
  - Floodlight Cup winners 1990–91
- Bedfordshire Premier Cup
  - Winners 1983–84, 2001–02
- Bedfordshire Senior Cup
  - Winners 1965–66, 1978–79, 1996–97, 2003–04, 2009–10
- Bedfordshire Intermediate Cup
  - Winners 1957–58
- Hinchingbrooke Cup
  - Winners 1977–78, 1979–80, 1981–82, 1996–97
- Biggleswade Knockout Cup
  - Winners 1977–78, 1980–81

== Records ==
- Best FA Cup performance: First round, 2011–12, 2012–13
- Best FA Trophy performance: Fifth round, 2003–04
- Best FA Vase performance: Winners, 1994–95
- Record attendance: 2,000 vs Luton Town reserves, Bedfordshire Senior Cup, 1906
- Most appearances: Gary Marshall

== See also ==
- Arlesey Town F.C. players
- Arlesey Town F.C. managers
