= Stony Stratford Town F.C. =

Association football club in England

Coordinates: 52°03′38″N 0°51′20″W

Stony Stratford Town FC
- Full name: Stony Stratford Town Football Club
- Nickname: Stony
- Founded: 1898
- Ground: Ostler's Lane, Stony Stratford
- Capacity: 500
- Chairman: Damon Brown
- Manager: Aaron Evans
- League: Spartan South Midlands League Division Two
- 2025–26: Spartan South Midlands League Division Two, 15th of 17
- Website: http://www.stonystratfordtownfc.com/
Home colours	Away colours

Stony Stratford Town F.C. is a football club based in Stony Stratford, a constituent town of Milton Keynes, Buckinghamshire, England. The Senior Team are currently members of the Spartan South Midlands League Division Two and play at Ostlers Lane. For 26/27 Mens Reserves (North Bucks Intermediate), Mens Sunday (MK Sunday League), and Veterans (MK Vets League).

The club also has both development and competitive youth teams from under-7 to under-18 that play in The Milton Keynes District Development League (Boys and mixed) and the Bedfordshire FA Girls League (Girls).

== History ==
The club was formed in 1898, and started playing in the local leagues. This was Division 1 of the Buckingham and District League, joining the league with Newport Pagnell Trinity in the league's second year. The club finished runners-up for the 1898/99 season. The club also played in the Berks and Bucks Cup competitions winning the Junior cup in the 1908–09 campaign. More success followed after the first world war when the club went on to win the North Bucks & District Football League in the 1925–26 season.

After the Second World War the club now playing under the name Stony Stratford Sports won Division two of the North Bucks & District Football League in the 1946–47 competition. The club then moved leagues and joined the South Midlands League in Division one. In their second season in the South Midlands league the club finished as runners up and gained promotion to the Premier Division. The 1952–53 season began with the club changing its name to Stony Stratford Town again, and the season ended with the club leaving the league and returning to the North Bucks & District Football League. The club then became champions of Division two again in the 1956–57 season.

The 1960–61 season, saw the club rejoin the South Midlands League again, starting in Division one where they finished runners-up at the first attempt and gained promotion to the Premier Division. The club then quickly followed this up the next season with another runners-up position. The club spent the next thirteen seasons in the Premier Division, during which time they finished as runners-up three times in a row in the 1970–71, 1971–72 and 1972–73 competitions. Their fourteenth season in the Premier division, 1974–75, saw the club finish bottom of the division and relegated to Division one. Further relegation followed the next season as the club finished bottom of Division One and relegated to the Premier Division of the Northamptonshire Combination Football League.

After just one season in the Northamptonshire Combination Football League, the club moved to the premier division of the North Bucks & District Football League for the start of the 1977–78 campaign. The 1987–88 season saw the club rejoin the South Midlands league again, in Division one. For the start of the 1993–94 season, the league was restructured and the club was placed in the third tier, Division one, however they were quickly back in the second tier, the Senior Division, when they became champions of Division one that season. In 1997 the South Midlands League merged with the London Spartan League to form the Spartan South Midlands Football league and the club was placed in the Senior Division of the new league. The 1997–98 season also saw the club make their debut in the FA Vase, where they lost to Bicester Town in the second qualifying round.

The club left the Spartan South Midlands League in 2016, rejoining the North Bucks & District League where they were placed in the second tier, Intermediate Division. They stayed in the Intermediate Division for three seasons before the demise of the Senior Team in 2018. No Senior Team was registered in any league during the COVID-19 affected 2019/20 season.

Following the restart of grassroots football for the 2020/21 season, the club registered a young, development team in the North Bucks & District League fourth tier, Division Two. The competition was COVID affected and completed as a half-season with Stony finishing as champions and winning promotion to Division One for the 2021/22 season. The 2021/22 season saw the team claim a league and cup double as they finished champions in Division One as well as winning the Division One Challenge Trophy on penalties against Olney Town Reserves. The club followed up with another double winning season in 2022/23 season when they won the Premier Division on goal difference from Great Horwood FC and won the Interdivisional Trophy beating Hale Leys United 3–1 in the final.

Stony Stratford Town FC joined the Spartan South Midlands League Division Two in the summer before the 2023/24 season. Since then they have finished 11th, 10th, and 15th respectively. They are entering their fourth season in the division.

At the beginning of the 2025/26 season the club added a Veterans side that play at Ostlers Lane on Sunday Morning and a Youth U18 Floodlit side that play in the Southern Counties Floodlit League Corinthian. They play on Thursdays on the main pitch at Ostlers Lane. The adults section continued to grow in 2026/27 with a Reserves Team registered in the North Bucks District Football League Intermediate Division and a Sunday Morning Men's team in the Wharfside Electrical Milton Keynes Sunday League Premier Division.

== Ground ==
Stony Stratford Town play their home games at Ostlers Lane, Stony Stratford, Milton Keynes, MK11 1AR.

Floodlights were added in 1996, and were officially switched on against Aston Villa's under-21 side in November of that year, in front of a capacity crowd.

Some youth age groups play their home games at Old Stratford Community Centre, Deanshanger Road, Old Stratford, MK19 6NL.

== Honours ==
=== League honours ===
- Buckingham & District League Division One
  - Runners-up (1): 1898–99
- South Midlands League Premier Division :
  - Runners-up (4): 1961–62, 1970–71, 1971–72, 1972–73
- South Midlands League Division One:
  - Champions (1): 1993–94
  - Runners-up (1): 1960–61
- North Bucks & District Football League Premier
  - Champions (1): 2022–23
- North Bucks & District Football League Division One:
  - Champions (1): 1925–26, 2021–22
- North Bucks & District Football League Division Two:
  - Champions (3): 1946–47, 1956–57, 2020–21

=== Cup honours ===
- Spartan South Midlands Football League Division One Cup:
  - Runners-up (1): 2012–13
- South Midlands League Division One Cup:
  - Winners (1): 1994–95
- Berks & Bucks FA Junior Cup:
  - Winners (1): 1908–09
- Bedford League Cup:
  - Winners (1): 1927–28
- Stantonbury Hospital Cup:
  - Winners (1): 1925–26
- Wolverton Hospital Cup:
  - Winners (1): 1925–26
- Buckingham Charity Cup:
  - Runners-up (2): 2001–02, 2012–13
- North Bucks Interdivisional Trophy
  - Winners (1): 2022–23
- North Bucks Division One Challenge Trophy
  - Winners (1): 2021–22

== Records ==
- Highest League Position: 2nd in South Midlands League Premier Division 1961–62, 1970–71, 1971–72, 1972–73
- FA Vase best performance: Second qualifying round 1997–98

== Former players ==
A list of players that have played for the club at one stage and meet one of the following criteria;

1. Players that have played/managed in the football league or any foreign equivalent to this level (i.e. fully professional league).
2. Players with full international caps.
- (England) George Henson
- (England) Darren Dykes
- (England) Michael Kyd
