= Brache Sparta F.C. =

Brache Sparta (Now Brache Phoenix FC)
- Full name: Brache Sparta Football Club (Brache Phoenix Football Club)
- Nickname: The Foxes
- Founded: 1960; 2021 (re-established)
- Dissolved: 2011
- Ground: Stockwood Park Athletics Centre, Luton

Brache Sparta Football Club is a football club based in Luton, England. The team was formed in 1960, and took its name from an area of Luton and the Czech side in vogue at the time they were formed.

The club is affiliated to the Bedfordshire County Football Association.

== History ==
Brache Sparta initially played in the Luton & District League at Stockwood Park; however, in 1973, Brache, with help from the council, acquired Foxdell Recreation Ground and built a Clubhouse with an adjacent pitch. This meant that they could successfully apply for admittance into the South Midlands League for the 1975–76 season.

After many struggles, promotion was eventually gained to the Premier League in 1985. However, this was met with the resignation of their Manager Barry Fancini and a mass exodus of players. As a result, the club was relegated. Though it wasn't long before Brache were back in the Premier League, regaining their place in 1988 under Barry O'Keefe. Kevin Millett then guided the team to the final of the Premier Division Cup; 2nd place in the league and to a Challenge Trophy Final the following term.

=== 1990s ===
Floodlights became mandatory in the league for the 1993–94 season, though Brache Sparta were refused planning permission for them, meaning the club had to groundshare with Hitchin Town; something which came at considerable expense.

Eventually, with thanks to Archie Devlin's efforts, floodlights were in place for the 1994–95 season. This season saw ex-Arsenal apprentice Steve Brinkman take over the reins, who led the team to a string of successes. In his first two seasons, the team finished 3rd and 4th, and the following season, unluckily, the team missed out on the title by a margin of one goal.

However, this wasn't the end, as in 1997–98, Brache Sparta finally saw the League Championship Pennant flying at Foxdell, as well as making their way to the Challenge Trophy and Beds Premier Cup finals.

In 1996–97 and 1997–98, the FA Vase Third Round was reached with over 300 people present for the Wisbech Town game in 1997. However, Steve Brinkman tendered his resignation in the summer of 2000 in order to spend more time with his family. This was short-lived, as he died of a congenital heart disease within a year of leaving.

=== 2000s ===
Mark Smith was his successor, but despite his best efforts, the club was relegated in 2001–02. Since then, the club has been going through a rebuilding stage, both on and off the pitch. Things have got a little better, with the club winning the Beds Senior Cup in 2003–04, however the club is now notable for having the lowest average attendance in the top 10 tiers of the English football league system: with an average of 7 spectators turning out to see the Foxes each match for the 2007–08 season.

It was announced that for 2010–11 the club would play at the North Herts Arena in Baldock, some miles from Luton, while Foxdell was refurbished. This plan fell through and the club went into free fall with horrendous mis- management off the pitch resulting in the club folding in 2011.

In 2021, Brache Sparta football club has currently rebuilt and rebranded as Brache Phoenix Football Club, who currently plays in the Bedfordshire County Football League Division 2.

== Honours ==
- Spartan South Midlands League
  - Premier Division North champions 1997–98
- Bedfordshire Senior Trophy
  - Winners 2002–03, 2005–06
- Bedfordshire Intermediate Cup
  - Winners 1971–72

== Records ==
- Best FA Vase performance: Fourth round, 1997–98
