= Langford F.C. =

Association football club in England

Coordinates: 52.044°N 0.285°W

Langford
- Full name: Langford Football Club
- Nickname: The Reds
- Founded: 1908
- Ground: Forde Park, Langford
- Capacity: 2,000
- Chairman: Paul Vince
- Manager: Matthew Fisher
- League: Spartan South Midlands League Division One
- 2024–25: Spartan South Midlands League Division One, 16th of 20
Home colours	Away colours

Langford Football Club is a football club based in Langford, Bedfordshire, England. Affiliated to the Bedfordshire Football Association, they are currently members of the Spartan South Midlands League Division One and play at Forde Park.

== History ==
After a decade of the village team playing friendly matches against other local villages, Langford Football Club was established in 1908. They joined the Biggleswade & District Junior League, playing their first match on 12 September against Shefford Town and winning 6–2. In 1910–11 they were runners-up in the league and went on to finish second in three of the next four seasons and won the Bedfordshire Junior Cup in 1913–14. The club later joined the Bedford & District League and were Division One champions in 1931–32. In 1949–50 they won the league title again, as well as the Britannia Cup.

In 1951 Langford moved up to Division One of the South Midlands League. A third-place finish in 1954–55 saw them promoted to the Premier Division, but they were relegated back to Division One at the end of the following season. The club pulled out of the league at the end of the 1956–57 season, but returned in 1958. After finishing third in Division One in 1968–69, a season in which they also won the Bedfordshire Intermediate Cup, they were promoted back to the Premier Division. However, they finished second-from-bottom of the Premier Division in 1970–71 and were relegated to Division One. Another third-place finish in Division One in 1972–73 resulted in promotion back to the Premier Division. The 1972–73 season also saw them win the Junior Cup, and the following season they won the league's Challenge Trophy, which they won again in 1975–76.

Langford remained in the Premier Division until the end of the 1979–80 season, when they finished bottom and were relegated to Division One. They were promoted back to the Premier Division after finishing third in Division One in 1984–85. In 1988–89 they were Premier Division champions and won the League Trophy. In 1997 the South Midlands League merged with the Spartan League to form the Spartan South Midlands League, with Langford placed in the Premier Division North. After they finished bottom of the division in the new league's inaugural season, they were demoted to the Senior Division for the following season. In 2001 the division was renamed Division One.

In 2003–04 Langford won the Division One Cup, and after finishing the season as Division One runners-up, earning promotion to the Premier Division. They were relegated back to Division One at the end of the 2010–11 season after finishing bottom of the Premier Division. In 2016–17 the club won the Division One Cup, defeating Wodson Park 1–0 in the final.

== Ground ==
After World War I the club played at Vicarage End. In 1925 they moved to the Leys, but returned to Vicarage End in 1935 when the site was used for housing. The club moved to the King George V Memorial Playing Fields in 1949. In 1984 they moved again, this time to Forde Park. In 2007 a 106-seat stand was erected and a covered terrace with capacity for 100 was opened the following year.

== Staff ==
Role	Name
Manager	Matthew Fisher
Assistant Manager	Bailey Rose
Coach	Jamie Dunn
Coach	Tony Battle

== Honours ==
- Spartan South Midlands League
  - Division One Cup winners 2003–04, 2016–17
- South Midlands League
  - Premier Division champions 1988–89
  - League Trophy winners 1988–89
  - Challenge Trophy winners 1973–74, 1975–76, 1994–95
- Bedford & District League
  - Division One champions 1931–32, 1949–50
  - Britannia Cup winners 1949–50
- Bedfordshire Intermediate Cup
  - Winners 1968–69
- Bedfordshire Junior Cup
  - Winners 1913–14, 1972–73
- North Bedfordshire Charity Cup
  - Winners 1927–28, 1930–31, 1969–70, 1987–88, 1992–93, 1998–99, 2001–02, 2007–08
- Biggleswade & District Knock-Out Cup
  - Winners 1973–74, 1974–75, 1975–76, 1985–86, 1990–91, 1994–95, 2013–14
- Hinchingbrooke Cup
  - Winners 1972–73

== Records ==
- Best FA Cup performance: First qualifying round, 1993–94, 1995–96
- Best FA Vase performance: Second round, 1995–96
- Record attendance: 450 vs Queens Park Rangers, friendly, 1985
