= Cranfield United F.C. =

Association football club in England

Coordinates: 52.0802°N 0.6040°W

Cranfield United
- Full name: Cranfield United Football Club
- Nickname: United
- Founded: 1903
- Ground: Crawley Road, Cranfield
- Chairman: Stewart Perrin
- Manager: Jason Goldman
- League: Spartan South Midlands League Division One
- 2025–26: Spartan South Midlands League Division One, 11th of 21
Home colours

Cranfield United Football Club is a football club based in Cranfield, near Bedford, Bedfordshire, England. The club is affiliated to the Bedfordshire County Football Association. They are currently members of the Spartan South Midlands League Division One.

== History ==
The club was formed in 1903. After the first world war they played in the Bedford and District League and then moved to the North Bucks & District Football League in 1930. They joined Division 2b of the South Midlands League in 1949, and won it at the first attempt, winning promotion to Division one. They were promoted to the premier division in the 1952–53 seasons when they finished as runners-up. The club remained in the premier division until the 1955–56 season when they were relegated to Division one, and three seasons later they were relegated again to the Bedford and District League.

The club returned to the South Midlands League, in the 1976–77 season, starting in Division one. The club remained in Division one until the end of the 1995–96 season, except for three seasons from 1985 to 1986 when they were in the Premier Division. The club left the South Midlands League again in 1996. In 2001 the club joined the Spartan South Midlands Football League in Division Two and four seasons later they were promoted to Division One.

In the 2009–10 they played in the FA Cup for the first ever time, losing to Crawley Green 3–1 in the extra preliminary qualifying round.

Cranfield United resigned from the Spartan South Midlands League at the end of the 2012–13 season and took their reserve team's place in Division Two of the Bedfordshire County League. At the end of the 2014–2015 season Cranfield United's first team won the Bedfordshire County Football League Division One as Champions, and were promoted to the Premiership Division for the 2015-2016 Season. The Reserve side also won the Bedfordshire League Division three as Champions during the same season, and for the 2015–2016 season will be playing in Division Two.

== Ground ==
Cranfield United play their home games at Crawley Road, Cranfield, Bedfordshire, MK43 0AA.

== Honours ==
=== League honours ===
- South Midlands League Division One:
  - Runners up (1): 1952–53
- South Midlands League Division 2b:
  - Winners (1): 1949–50

=== Cup honours ===
- Bedfordshire Senior Cup:
  - Runners up (1): 1952–53

== Records ==
- Highest League Position: 4th in South Midlands League 1954–55
- FA Cup best performance: Extra Preliminary qualifying round 2009–10, 2012–13
- FA Vase best performance: First round 2024–25
