= Pitstone & Ivinghoe F.C. =

Association football club in England

Coordinates: 51°49′50″N 0°38′58″W

Pitstone & Ivinghoe
- Full name: Pitstone & Ivinghoe Football Club
- Founded: 1957
- Ground: Pitstone Recreation Ground
- Manager: Alex Payne
- League: Spartan South Midlands League Division Two
- 2025–26: Spartan South Midlands League Division Two, 1st of 17
Home colours

Pitstone & Ivinghoe Football Club are a football club based in Pitstone, near Leighton Buzzard, England. They are members of the Spartan South Midlands League Division Two. The club is affiliated to the Berks & Bucks Football Association.

== History ==
The club was formed in 1957 after the demise of Ivinghoe & Pitstone F.C. due to financial difficulties and started playing at Pitstone Recreation Ground. The club started in the West Herts League and in their inaugural season won the West Herts Challenge Cup. In the early 1960s, the club then joined the Aylesbury & District League, before returning to the West Herts League in 1966.

The club moved leagues again in 1970 to join the Dunstable Alliance League, not before enjoying some previous cup success with winning the Marsworth Cup twice and both the Apsley Junior and Senior Cups. In the 1976–77 Campaign the club achieved a treble by winning the Premier Division, Premier Division Cup and the Reading Junior Cup. The next season with improved facilities at the Recreation Ground the club was accepted into the South Midlands League and in doing so gained Intermediate status with the Berks & Bucks FA.

The club then spent the next eleven seasons in Division One, earning promotion to the Premier Division under the guidance of manager Ian Magill in the 1987–88 season. The club also lifted the Division One Cup and South Midlands League Challenge Trophy. Two seasons later in the 1989–90 season saw the club gain more silverware, by winning the Premier Division. The club then spent three more seasons in the top flight before having to step down to the newly formed Senior Division as their ground did not have floodlights. The club finished bottom of the Senior Division twice and were then relegated to Division One at the end of the 1994–95 season.

At the start of the 1997–98 season with the merger of the South Midlands League and Spartan League, the club became founder members of Spartan South Midlands League Division One North. That season also saw the return of manager Ian Magill who guided them to promotion again to the Senior Division (which was then subsequently renamed Division One) in the 2000–01 season as Champions. In addition that season the club also enjoyed its first County Cup success, by beating Hellenic Football League side Finchampstead 2–0 in the Berks & Bucks Intermediate Cup Final.

Ian Magill then stood down in the 2002–03 season and was replaced by Sean Downey. It proved a successful change as the club won Division One title by a ten-point margin, scoring over a hundred goals in the process. However the club was not able to gain promotion as the club's facilities did not fulfill league requirements. Two seasons later, the club was then relegated to Division Two as a result of the ground not meeting the necessary requirements again.

On 16 April 2013 Pitstone defeated Aston Clinton in the final of the Berks & Bucks Intermediate Cup with a 2–1 win, played at Chesham United. As of the 2019-20 Season, Pitstone & Ivinghoe FC sat in second place of Spartan South Midlands Division Two before the season was suspended in March. A new phase of work for the existing Pavilion Facilities was completed in November 2020 doubling the size of the current building whilst incorporating new Changing facilities, Physiotherapy Room, Turnstile, Footpath work, and Function Area.

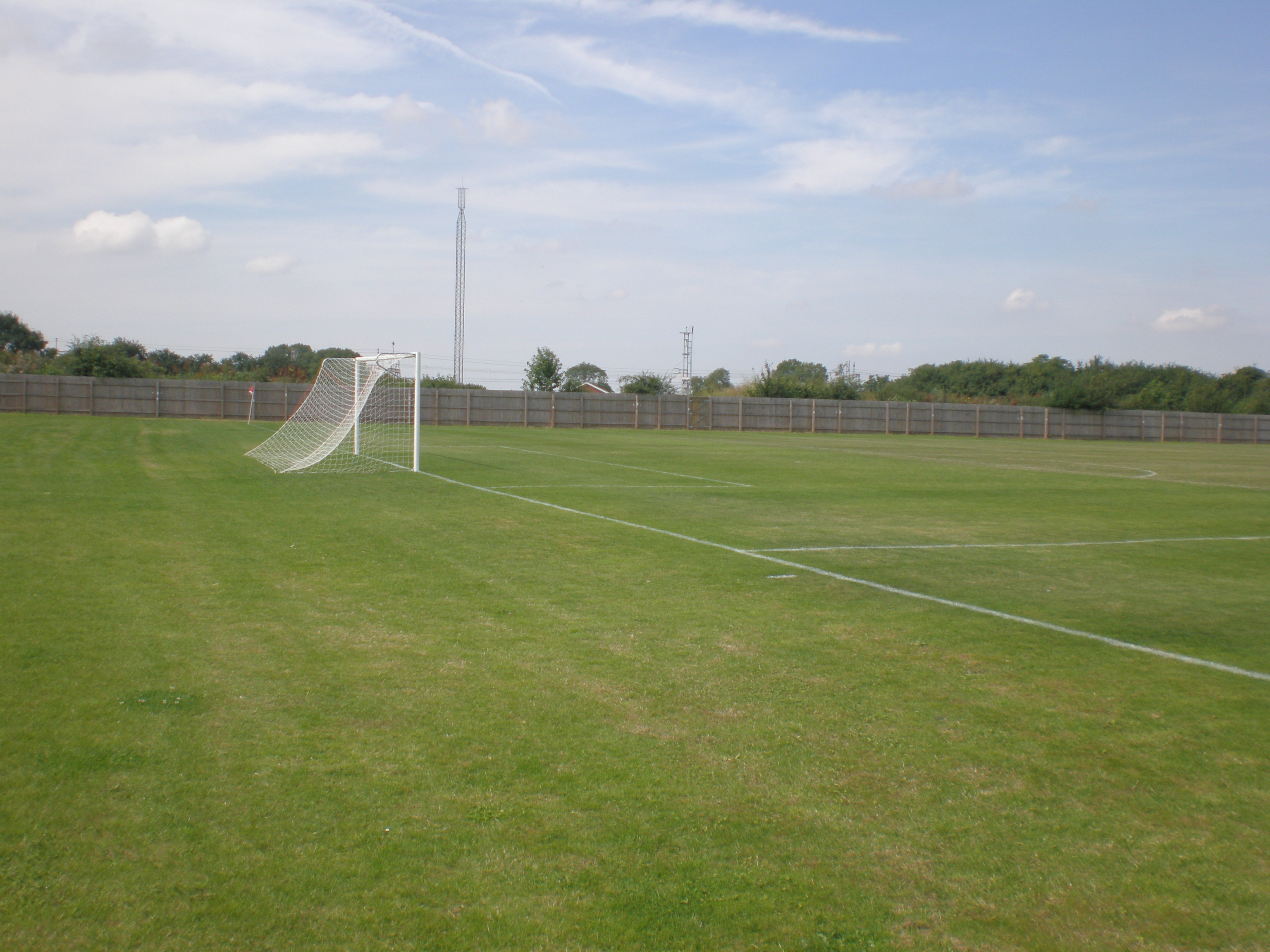

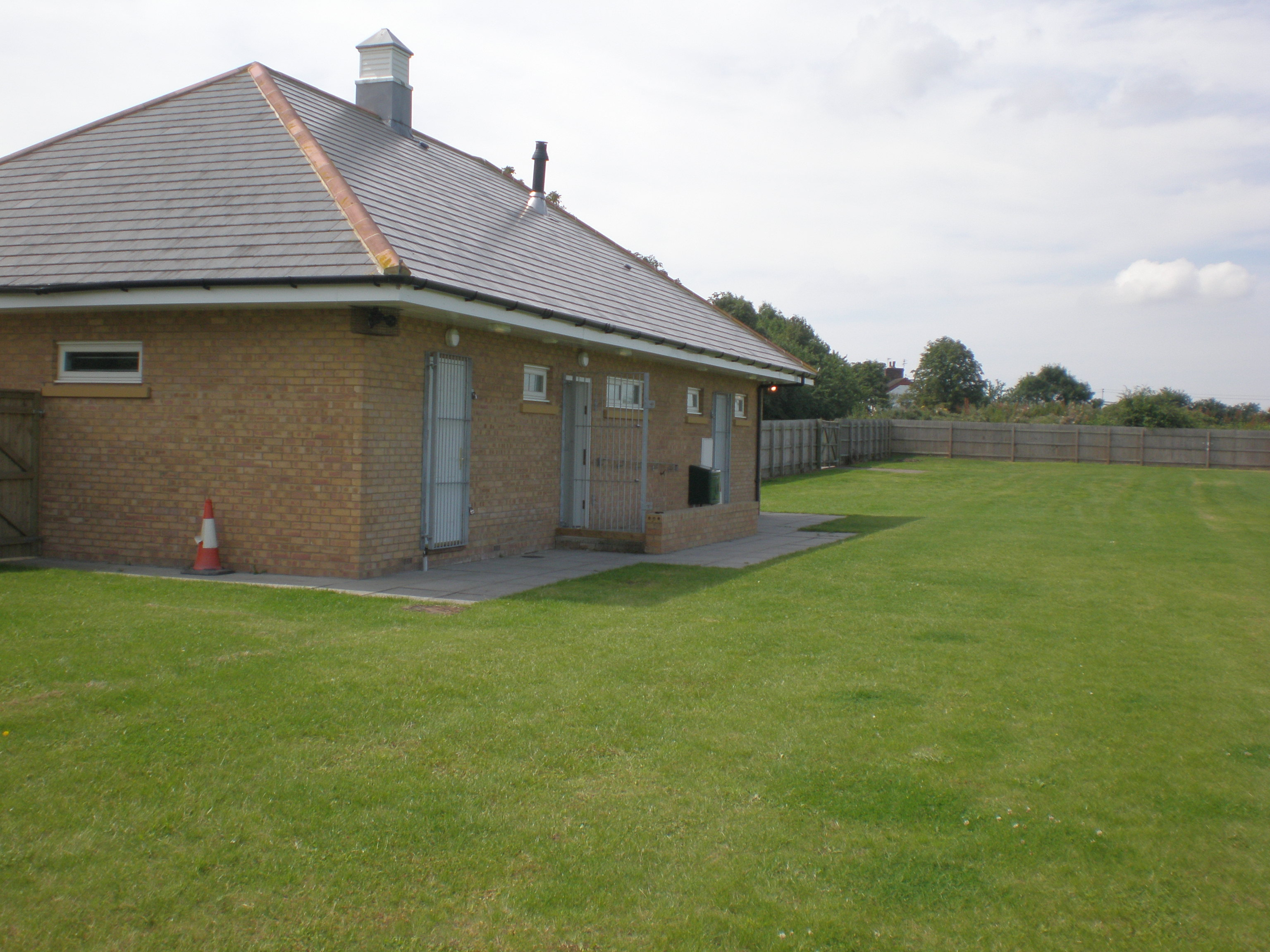

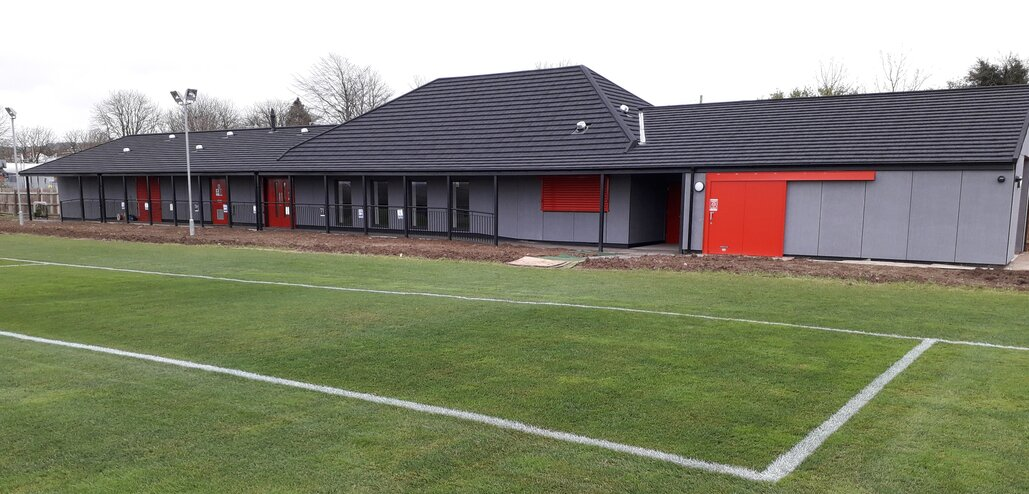

== Ground ==
Pitstone & Ivinghoe United play their games at Pitstone Sports Pavilion, Marsworth Road, Pitstone.

== Honours ==
=== League honours ===
- Spartan South Midlands League Division One:
  - Champions – 2000–01, 2002–03
- Spartan South Midlands League Division Two:
  - Champions - 2025–26
- South Midlands League Premier Division:
  - Champions: 1989–90
- South Midlands LeagueDivision One:
  - Champions: 1987–88
- Dunstable Alliance Premier Division:
  - Champions: 1973–74, 1975–76, 1976–77
  - Runners-up: 1970–71, 1974–75
- West Herts Premier Division:
  - Champions: 1968–69
- West Herts Division One:
  - Champions: 1966–67

=== Cup honours ===
- Berks & Bucks Intermediate Cup:
  - Winners: 2000–01 & 2012–13
- South Midlands League Challenge Trophy:
  - Winners: 1988–89
- South Midlands League Premier Division Cup:
  - Runners-up: 1989–90
- South Midlands League Division One Cup:
  - Winners: 1987–88
- Dunstable Alliance Premier Division Cup:
  - Winners: 1974–75, 1976–77
- West Herts Challenge Cup:
  - Winners: 1957–58
- Reading junior Cup:
  - Winners: 1976–77
  - Runners-up: 1975–76
- Apsley Senior Cup:
  - Winners: 1968–69
- Apsley Junior Cup:
  - Winners: 1966–67
- Marsworth Cup:
  - Winners: 1966–67, 1967–68
- Leighton Challenge Cup:
  - Runners-up: 1971–72, 2000–01
- Watford Peace Memorial Shield:
  - Runners-up: 1968–69

== Records ==
- Highest League Position: 1st in South Midlands League Premier Division 1989–90
