= Shefford Town & Campton F.C. =

Association football club in England

Coordinates: 52°01′52.0″N 0°19′30.1″W

Shefford Town & Campton
- Full name: Shefford Town & Campton Football Club
- Nickname: The Bluemen
- Founded: 2010; 16 years ago
- Ground: Shefford Sports Club, Shefford, Bedfordshire
- Capacity: 1,000
- Chairman: Graham Earl
- Manager: Matt Evans
- League: Bedfordshire County League Premier Division
- 2025–26: Spartan South Midlands League Division One, 21st of 21 (relegated)
Home colours

Shefford Town & Campton Football Club is an English football club based in the town of Shefford, Bedfordshire. The team plays its home matches at Shefford Sports Club on Hitchin Road in Shefford and at Campton Playing Fields, Rectory Road in Campton. The club is competing at the 9th tier of the English football league system in the Spartan South Midlands Football League Premier Division. The club also has a reserve side competing in the Premier Division, an U23s team competing in Division 4 and a Development Team in Division 2 all in the Bedfordshire County Football League.

Originally formed in 1910 as Shefford Town, their first successful period came in the 1950s: starting in 1949–50, the team won two South Midlands League championships and three Beds Senior Cups within five seasons. Subsequently, the club finished as runners-up in the Parthenon League, and won the United Counties League title in 1960–61. Shefford would not match these achievements until the early 1980s, when the club was promoted from the South Midlands League's second tier in 1982–83 and won the league title a year later.

After relegation in 1990, Shefford Town folded in 1994. The town remained without a senior football team until 2009, when the club was reformed. In 2010 Shefford Town merged with near neighbours Campton.

The club has had success both on and off the pitch in recent years since its reformation, the club were crowned Bedfordshire County Premier Division Winners in 2011–12, 2017–18 and 2018–19. The Bedfordshire County League Britannia Cup was won in both 2011 & 2014 and the East Beds Charity Cup was won by the Reserve team in 2015. The club has also finished runners up in the Biggleswade knock-out cup in 2015, 2016 & 2017.

At the end of 2018–19 season Shefford announced its intentions to seek promotion into the Spartan South Midlands Football League, they duly wrapped up the Bedfordshire County League title and passed the relevant ground grading, so the club is all set to step back into the league it folded out of back in 1994.

After 3 seasons in Division One of SSML, the club won the play off at the end of the 2021/22 season and achieved promotion to Non League Step 5 and the Premier Division where they are competing at present.

The club is affiliated to the Bedfordshire County Football Association.

== History ==
Founded in 1910, the club played its first football in September when it began to enter a team into the Biggleswade and District Junior League. Playing home matches at Ivel Road, the team contested this local competition until 1949–50, when Shefford began to enter its team into the South Midlands League. The side won the Beds Senior Cup that season, a feat it repeated in 1953. After finishing runners-up in the Beds Senior Cup the following year, winning it again in 1955 and capping these feats with two successive league championships, Shefford Town started to contest the Parthenon League against teams from further afield – some away trips took the team as far as London. In the new league, Shefford finished as runners-up in the first season before spending two more years in the competition. After three years, the long journeys and sparse league programme led the club to join the more local United Counties League.

In 1960–61, the league championship came to Shefford, and the club added the North Beds Charity Cup to its trophy cabinet during the same week. The following season saw a drastic change in fortunes, as the team finished second from bottom – the club reacted by arranging a move back to the South Midlands League. The team came third during the first season back in the division, and in 1973–74 the team finished as runners-up. However, the club was relegated in 1975–76. Success didn't come back to Ivel Road until the early 1980s – in 1982–83 Shefford lifted the Division One title, and finished the following season as league champions. During 1983–84, Shefford also won the North Beds Charity Cup, the Biggleswade Knockout contest and the Bedfordshire Intermediate Cup. The North Beds Charity and Biggleswade Knockout double was repeated the following year.

During the late 1980s the club stagnated, as the team tumbled back into Division One after finishing bottom in 1989–90. After three uneventful seasons, Shefford Town were moved to the Senior Division on league re-organisation. Though performances improved, with the team finishing fifth in 1993–94, the club was wound up and played its final match on 18 May 1994.

Shefford Town Football Club was reformed in 2009 by Dan Pinkerton and Graham Earl, who had been involved in local youth football. The new club was accepted into the Bedfordshire County Football League for the 2009–10 season, and assigned a place in Division Two, at level 13 of the English football league system.

The club has had success both on and off the pitch in recent years since its reformation, the club were crowned Bedfordshire County Premier Division Winners in 2011–12, 2017–18 and 2018–19. The Bedfordshire County League Britannia Cup was won in both 2011 & 2014 and the East Beds Charity Cup was won by the Reserve team in 2015. The club has also finished runners up in the Biggleswade knock-out cup in 2015, 2016 & 2017.

At the end of 2018–19 season Shefford announced its intentions to seek promotion into the Spartan South Midlands Football League, which they achieved by winning the Bedfordshire County League title and passing the relevant ground grading. Shefford Town & Campton entered the FA Vase for the first time in 2021–22, reaching the third round.

The club made history in 2022-23 when entering the FA Cup for the first time and make it all the way to the 3rd Qualifying round.

== Stadia ==
Shefford Town & Campton FC play fixtures at two local grounds. Rectory Road in Campton has been the club's home since the 1920s and remains in use. The site is a village playing field with Step 7 changing facilities, which were updated by the club's players and management to meet modern standards for continued use of the location.

For the 2014/15 season, the club moved into its new home at Shefford Sports Club on Hitchin Road in Shefford. The new ground boasts a fantastic clubhouse, changing facilities and a well looked after pitch. In the spring of 2019 the club added a new stand with standing capacity for 100 spectators to assist with its push for promotion to step 6 of the Football League Pyramid.

Shefford's historic ground was on Ivel Road in Shefford, when the club folded in 1994 the land was left derelict until development started on it in the late 2000s, this paved the way for the new facility on Hitchin Road to be built. The old football ground is now a street known as Old Bridge Way, which is just off of Ivel Road.

== Backroom staff ==
Updated Feb 2024.

=== Directors ===
- Chairman: Sean Moore
- Vice Chairman:
- Treasurer: Graham Earl
- Club secretary: Dan Gauntlett
- Committee Members: Graham Earl, Sean Moore, Dan Gauntlett & Lasse Hammer

Manager: Sean Moore

=== Management ===
- Team manager: Sean Moore
- First team coaches: Dan Gauntlett
- Reserve Team Manager: Tim West & Antonio Traetto
- Development Team Manager: Glenn Cook
- U23s Manager: Adam Heley & Joazinho Singh

== Records ==
The club records include:

=== Shefford Town & Campton FC ===
- Best FA Cup performance: 3rd qualifying round, 2022–23
- Best FA Vase performance: 3rd round, 2020–21

=== Shefford Town FC ===
- Best FA Cup performance: 1st qualifying round, 1954–55, 1956–57
- Best FA Vase performance: 1st round, 1974–75

== Honours ==
Shefford Town teams have won several honours, including three Beds Senior Cups and four league championships. They have also finished as runners-up in the Beds Senior Cup on two occasions, and finished as league runners-up three times.

Honour		Year(s)
South Midlands League Premier Division	champions	1953–54, 1954–55, 1983–84
South Midlands League Premier Division	runners-up	1952–53, 1973–74
South Midlands League Division One	champions	1982–83
South Midlands League Division One	Play-offs	2021-22
United Counties Football League	champions	1960–61
Parthenon League	runners-up	1955–56
Beds Senior Cup	winners	1949–50, 1952–53, 1954–55
Beds Senior Cup	runners-up	1953–54, 1958–59
