= Leighton Town F.C. =

Association football club in England

Coordinates: 51°54′46″N 0°39′35″W

Leighton Town
- Full name: Leighton Town Football Club
- Nickname: The Reds
- Founded: 1885
- Ground: Bell Close, Leighton Buzzard
- Capacity: 2,800 (400 seated)
- Chairman: Sean Downey
- Manager: Andy Leese and Jon Meakes
- League: Southern League Premier Division Central
- 2025–26: Southern League Division One Central, 1st of 22 (promoted)
- Website: http://www.leightontownfc.co.uk/
Home colours	Away colours

Leighton Town Football Club are an English football club located in Leighton Buzzard, Bedfordshire. They were established in 1885. The club plays home games at Bell Close and currently play in the Southern League Premier Division Central.

== History ==
=== Early history ===
Leighton Town F.C. was formed in 1885 and in their early years were winners of the Leighton and District League on several occasions. They were one of the original members of the South Midlands League (then known as the Bedfordshire County League) in 1922, the same year they changed their name to Leighton United (a change which lasted until 1963). They were also members of the Spartan League from 1922 to 1952, but their only successes were two Spartan League Division Two titles in 1923–24 and 1927–28.

In 1952, they became founder member of the Hellenic League but after two seasons moved back to the South Midlands League. In 1965–66, Leighton finished bottom of the Premier Division, but won the title the following season. They then returned to the Spartan League once again, followed by a two-year spell in the United Counties League before returning once again to the South Midlands League where they were to remain until 1992.

=== Promotion to Isthmian League ===
In the 1991–92 season, Leighton won the South Midlands Premier Division title and stepped up to the Isthmian League, initially in Division Three, with promotion to Division Two following in 1996. The 2000–01 season brought relegation but the club bounced back in 2004, winning the title of what was now called Division Two. That same year re-organisation of the pyramid saw them switched to the Southern League.

Craig Wells resigned from the club early into the 2012–13 season – despite a strong end to the previous campaign, however he rejoined the side as manager in June 2013. Due to heavy debt and increasing costs, the club made the decision not to pay their players for the 2013–14 season, becoming the only amateur side in the division.

Wells left the manager's position again in June 2014, replaced by former Ampthill Town boss Craig Bicknell.

After only one season at the club, Bicknell was sacked as the manager, despite the team reaching their best league position in recent years, and was replaced by former Arlesey Town, Hemel Hempstead Town, Aylesbury United and Aylesbury boss Mark Eaton in June 2015, Eaton was sacked at the end of October 2015 following a poor run of results, however a dispute between the departing manager and the club unfolded in the local paper.

Following Leighton Town's relegation from the Southern League Division One Central in 2016, the club parted company with manager Stuart Murray.

=== Spartan South Midlands League (2016–2023) ===
Murray was replaced by former Ashford Town (Middlesex) manager Paul Burgess in June 2016, as the club prepared for their first season back in the Spartan South Midlands Football League Premier Division following their relegation. Burgess resigned in November and was replaced with Scott Reynolds as interim manager, with Adam Kirkup and Lee Halling being appointed as his assistants, and Sean Downey continuing in his role as general manager. In May 2018, after a 4th-placed finish in the league, manager Scott Reynolds resigned before being appointed as Aylesbury manager shortly afterwards. The club reached the quarter-finals of the FA Vase that season but were defeated 1–0 at home by 1874 Northwich.

On 16 May 2018, former Hemel Hempstead Town manager Danny Nicholls was appointed as manager. However, in October 2018, Nicholls resigned after just 12 league games due to a poor run of form, with Aylesbury manager Reynolds also resigning just two days later. Joe Sweeney and Paul Copson were appointed as joint managers to replace Nicholls shortly after. The club reached the quarter-finals of the FA Vase again in consecutive seasons, being defeated 4–3 by Corinthian in 2020 and 2–1 by Walsall Wood in 2021.

Sweeney and Copson left the club in October 2021 and were replaced by Paul Bonham, but in March 2022, Bonham left the club by mutual consent, as he was unable to work whilst undergoing back surgery, and he was replaced as manager by Lee Bircham. The club were promoted back to the Southern League Division One Central in Bircham's first full season after finishing as champions of the 2022–23 Spartan South Midlands Premier Division.

=== Return to Southern League (2023–present) ===
Following promotion back to the Southern League, manager Bircham was appointed as manager of Bedford Town and the club appointed Gary Flinn, who had won the 2022–23 FA Vase with Newport Pagnell Town, as his replacement.

Flinn was sacked as manager in September 2024, with Leighton winless in the league since March 2024, and Guy Kefford was appointed as interim manager. Former Tottenham Hotspur youth coach Paul Reed was appointed as his successor in November.

Leighton Town won the Southern League Division One Central with two games remaining in April 2026. This was the first time that they achieved promotion to Step 3 of the non-league system in their 141 year history. They also broke their modern attendance record (1,297) in the game where they won the league, a 5-0 victory against Rayners’ Lane.

== Club honours ==
- Southern League Division One Central:
  - Winners: 2025–26
- Isthmian League Division Two:
  - Winners: 2003–04
- Isthmian League Division Three:
  - Runners-up: 1995–96
- South Midlands League Premier Division:
  - Winners: 1966–67, 1991–92, 2022–23
- South Midlands League Division One :
  - Runners-up: 1978–79
- Bedfordshire Senior Challenge Cup
  - Winners: 1927, 1968–70, 1993, 2021–22

== Club records ==
- Best league performance:
  - 1st in Southern League Division One Central, 2025-26
- Best FA Cup performance:
  - 4th qualifying round, 2007–08
- Best FA Trophy performance:
  - 1st round, 2005–06
- Best FA Vase performance:
  - Quarter-finals, 2017–18, 2019–20, 2020–21

== Sources ==
- Leighton Town at the Football Club History Database
