= Totternhoe F.C. =

Association football club in England

Coordinates: 51°52′58″N 0°33′22″W

Totternhoe
- Full name: Totternhoe Football Club
- Founded: 1906
- Ground: Recreation Ground, Totternhoe
- Chairman: John Power
- Manager: Nick Brooke
- League: Spartan South Midlands League Division Two
- 2025–26: Spartan South Midlands League Division Two, 4th of 17
Home colours

Totternhoe Football Club is a football club based in Totternhoe, near Dunstable, Bedfordshire, England. The club is affiliated to the Bedfordshire County Football Association. They play in the Spartan South Midlands League Division Two.

== History ==
Totternhoe Football Club was formed in 1906. They joined the South Midlands League in 1958, leaving in 1975 before re-joining in 1979. When that league merged with the Spartan League in 1997, Totternhoe were among the founder members of the new Spartan South Midlands League, and still play in that league, currently in Division Two.

They have competed in the FA Vase on eleven occasions, but have progressed through the preliminary rounds once – in 1988–89 when they were eliminated in the first round proper by East Thurrock United.

== Honours ==
- South Midlands League Division One
  - Champions 1961–62
  - Runners-up 1968–69, 1985–86
- Spartan South Midlands League Division Two
  - Runners-up 2010–11, 2016–17

== Records ==
- FA Vase
  - First Round 1988–89
