= The 61 F.C. (Luton) =

Association football club in England

Coordinates: 51°53′24″N 0°26′48″W

The 61 (Luton)
- Full name: The 61 Football Club (Luton)
- Founded: 1961
- Ground: Kingsway Recreation Ground; Luton; Bedfordshire
- Capacity: 500
- Chairman: Richard Everitt
- League: Spartan South Midlands League Division Two
- 2025–26: Spartan South Midlands League Division Two, 13th of 17
Home colours	Away colours

The 61 Football Club (Luton) is a football club based in Luton, Bedfordshire, England. The club is affiliated to the Bedfordshire County Football Association. They have reached the Second Round of the FA Vase twice in their history. Currently they are members of the Spartan South Midlands League Division Two. They also have a reserve team that plays in the Spartan South Midlands League Reserve Group Two, and a third team who play in the Luton District and South Beds League Division One.

== History ==
The club was formed in 1961 and was named after the year of its foundation. The team joined the Hellenic League Division Two in 1972 switching to the South Midlands League Division One a year later. They won the league in 1980–81 and gained promotion to the Premier Division in which they finished runners-up in 1982–83. To date The 61FC Luton have the lowest attendance in FA Vase history. The club was relegated to Division One in 1998 and further relegated to Division Two in 2004 due to ground grading issues. They won the league in 2008–09 but were not promoted, again due to ground grading.

== Ground ==
The Kingsway Recreational Ground is a very basic council-run sports ground situated just off the A505 between Luton and Dunstable, hemmed in by housing. It has a small, basic but functional clubhouse. There are no floodlights at the venue.

== Honours ==
- South Midlands League Premier Division
  - Runners-up 1982–83
- South Midlands League Division One
  - Champions 1980–81
- Spartan South Midlands League Division Two
  - Champions 2008–09

== Records ==
- Best league performance: 2nd in South Midlands League Premier Division, 1982–83
- Best FA Cup performance: never entered
- Best FA Vase performance: 2nd round, 1983–84 and 1988–89

== Individual records ==
- Most appearances: Sean Ledwidge
- Most games as manager: Richard Everitt
- Longest serving member: Richard Everitt
