= 2026–27 Spartan South Midlands Football League =

The 2026–27 season is the 30th in the history of the Spartan South Midlands Football League, a football competition in England. The league operates three divisions, the Premier Division at Step 5, Division One at Step 6, and Division Two at Step 7, of the English football league system.

The constitution was announced on 14 May 2026.

== Premier Division ==
Spartan South Midlands Football League Premier Division
- Season: 2026–27

The Premier Division featured 17 clubs which competed in the division last season, along with three new clubs:

- Enfield, relegated from the Southern League
- Everett Rovers, promoted from Division One
- Newport Pagnell Town, transferred from the United Counties League

Three clubs left the division:

- Crawley Green, relegated to Division One
- Haringey Borough, promoted to the Southern League
- Winslow United, promoted to the Southern League

Additionally, Dunstable Town were renamed to Dunstable, following a merger with AFC Dunstable.

=== League table ===
| Pos | Team | Pld | W | D | L | GF | GA | GD | Pts | Promotion, qualification or relegation |
|---|---|---|---|---|---|---|---|---|---|---|
| 1 | Risborough Rangers | 16 | 13 | 1 | 2 | 58 | 17 | +41 | 40 | Promotion to the Southern League |
| 2 | Tring Athletic | 15 | 12 | 1 | 2 | 35 | 15 | +20 | 37 | Qualification for the play-offs |
| 3 | Harpenden Town | 17 | 11 | 3 | 3 | 40 | 25 | +15 | 36 | Qualification for the play-offs |
| 4 | Colney Heath | 17 | 11 | 2 | 4 | 38 | 23 | +15 | 35 | Qualification for the play-offs |
| 5 | Biggleswade United | 16 | 9 | 3 | 4 | 35 | 21 | +14 | 30 | Qualification for the play-offs |
| 6 | Cockfosters | 16 | 9 | 3 | 4 | 31 | 20 | +11 | 30 | |
| 7 | Kings Langley | 16 | 8 | 2 | 6 | 33 | 28 | +5 | 26 | |
| 8 | Baldock Town | 16 | 8 | 1 | 7 | 34 | 30 | +4 | 25 | |
| 9 | Potton United | 15 | 7 | 3 | 5 | 36 | 29 | +7 | 24 | |
| 10 | Dunstable | 18 | 6 | 6 | 6 | 35 | 30 | +5 | 24 | |
| 11 | Wormley Rovers | 16 | 7 | 3 | 6 | 21 | 30 | −9 | 24 | |
| 12 | AFC Welwyn | 16 | 6 | 4 | 6 | 25 | 33 | −8 | 22 | |
| 13 | Enfield | 14 | 5 | 3 | 6 | 34 | 25 | +9 | 18 | |
| 14 | Sawbridgeworth Town | 17 | 5 | 3 | 9 | 37 | 40 | −3 | 18 | |
| 15 | Everett Rovers | 16 | 4 | 3 | 9 | 28 | 43 | −15 | 15 | |
| 16 | Harlow Town | 16 | 4 | 3 | 9 | 22 | 37 | −15 | 15 | |
| 17 | Newport Pagnell Town | 16 | 4 | 2 | 10 | 16 | 34 | −18 | 14 | |
| 18 | Kempston Rovers | 16 | 3 | 3 | 10 | 17 | 30 | −13 | 12 | |
| 19 | Aylesbury Vale Dynamos | 18 | 3 | 1 | 14 | 21 | 52 | −31 | 10 | Relegation to Division One |
| 20 | Arlesey Town | 15 | 0 | 2 | 13 | 13 | 47 | −34 | 2 | Relegation to Division One |

Updated to match(es) played on 21 November 2026. Source: The FA Full-Time
Rules for classification: 1) points; 2) goal difference; 3) number of goals scored; 4) number of matches won; 5) head-to-head results

=== Results table ===
| Home \ Away | WLW | ARL | AVD | BAL | BGU | COC | COL | DUN | ENF | EVE | HRW | HPT | KEM | KLL | NPT | POT | RIS | SAW | TRI | WOR |
|---|---|---|---|---|---|---|---|---|---|---|---|---|---|---|---|---|---|---|---|---|
| AFC Welwyn | — | | | | | | | | | | | | | | | | | | | |
| Arlesey Town | | — | | | | | | | | | | | | | | | | | | |
| Aylesbury Vale Dynamos | | | — | | | | | | | | | | | | | | | | | |
| Baldock Town | | | | — | | | | | | | | | | | | | | | | |
| Biggleswade United | | | | | — | | | | | | | | | | | | | | | |
| Cockfosters | | | | | | — | | | | | | | | | | | | | | |
| Colney Heath | | | | | | | — | | | | | | | | | | | | | |
| Dunstable | | | | | | | | — | | | | | | | | | | | | |
| Enfield | | | | | | | | | — | | | | | | | | | | | |
| Everett Rovers | | | | | | | | | | — | | | | | | | | | | |
| Harlow Town | | | | | | | | | | | — | | | | | | | | | |
| Harpenden Town | | | | | | | | | | | | — | | | | | | | | |
| Kempston Rovers | | | | | | | | | | | | | — | | | | | | | |
| Kings Langley | | | | | | | | | | | | | | — | | | | | | |
| Newport Pagnell Town | | | | | | | | | | | | | | | — | | | | | |
| Potton United | | | | | | | | | | | | | | | | — | | | | |
| Risborough Rangers | | | | | | | | | | | | | | | | | — | | | |
| Sawbridgeworth Town | | | | | | | | | | | | | | | | | | — | | |
| Tring Athletic | | | | | | | | | | | | | | | | | | | — | |
| Wormley Rovers | | | | | | | | | | | | | | | | | | | | — |

Updated to match(es) played on unknown. Source: FA Full-Time Grid
Legend: Blue = home team win; Yellow = draw; Red = away team win.
For upcoming matches, an "a" indicates there is an article about the rivalry between the two participants.

=== Stadia and locations ===
Locations of the Premier Division clubs (Bedfordshire)
Locations of the Premier Division clubs (Hertfordshire)
Locations of the Premier Division clubs

| Team | Location | Stadium | Capacity |
|---|---|---|---|
| AFC Welwyn | Welwyn Garden City | Vauxhall Road (groundshare with Hemel Hempstead Town) | 3,152 |
| Arlesey Town | Arlesey | Hitchin Road | 2,920 |
| Baldock Town | Baldock | Hitchin Road | 2,920 |
| Aylesbury Vale Dynamos | Aylesbury | Haywood Way | |
| Biggleswade United | Biggleswade | Fairfield Road | 2,000 |
| Cockfosters | London (Cockfosters) | Chalk Lane | 1,000 |
| Colney Heath | Colney Heath | Recreation Ground | |
| Dunstable | Dunstable | Creasey Park | 3,065 |
| Enfield | Bishop's Stortford | Woodside Park (groundshare with Bishop's Stortford) | 4,525 |
| Everett Rovers | Watford | Leggatts Green | |
| Harlow Town | Harlow | The Harlow Arena | 3,500 |
| Harpenden Town | Harpenden | Rothamsted Park | |
| Kempston Rovers | Kempston | Hillgrounds Leisure | 2,000 |
| Kings Langley | Kings Langley | Sadiku Stadium | 1,963 |
| Newport Pagnell Town | Newport Pagnell | Willen Road | 2,000 |
| Potton United | Potton | The Hollow | |
| Risborough Rangers | Princes Risborough | The KAMTECH Stadium | 1,500 |
| Sawbridgeworth Town | Sawbridgeworth | Crofters End | 2,500 |
| Tring Athletic | Tring | Grass Roots Stadium | |
| Wormley Rovers | Wormley | Wormley Playing Fields | 500 |

== Division One ==
Spartan South Midlands Football League Division One
- Season: 2026–27

Division One featured sixteen clubs which competed in the division last season, along with four new clubs:

- Bugbrooke St Michaels, relegated from the United Counties League
- Burton Park Wanderers, promoted from the Northamptonshire Combination League
- Crawley Green, relegated from the Premier Division
- Woodford United, transferred from the Hellenic League

Five clubs left the division:

- Belstone, transferred to the Combined Counties League
- Desborough Town, promoted to the United Counties League
- Everett Rovers, promoted to the Premier Division
- London Colney, relegated to a feeder league
- Long Buckby, resigned from the league
- Shefford Town & Campton, relegated to a feeder league

=== League table ===
| Pos | Team | Pld | W | D | L | GF | GA | GD | Pts | Promotion, qualification or relegation |
|---|---|---|---|---|---|---|---|---|---|---|
| 1 | Wellingborough Whitworth | 16 | 14 | 1 | 1 | 54 | 24 | +30 | 43 | Promotion to the Premier Division |
| 2 | Eaton Socon | 16 | 12 | 3 | 1 | 42 | 14 | +28 | 39 | Qualification for the play-offs |
| 3 | Ampthill Town | 14 | 12 | 2 | 0 | 37 | 16 | +21 | 38 | Qualification for the play-offs |
| 4 | Irchester United | 16 | 11 | 2 | 3 | 32 | 19 | +13 | 35 | Qualification for the play-offs |
| 5 | Bugbrooke St Michaels | 14 | 8 | 4 | 2 | 31 | 16 | +15 | 28 | Qualification for the play-offs |
| 6 | Woodford United | 15 | 7 | 3 | 5 | 34 | 15 | +19 | 24 | |
| 7 | Cranfield United | 16 | 6 | 4 | 6 | 26 | 18 | +8 | 22 | |
| 8 | Leighton Town reserves | 16 | 6 | 4 | 6 | 35 | 28 | +7 | 22 | |
| 9 | Langford | 14 | 6 | 3 | 5 | 24 | 21 | +3 | 21 | |
| 10 | Burton Park Wanderers | 15 | 7 | 0 | 8 | 24 | 30 | −6 | 21 | |
| 11 | Crawley Green | 14 | 4 | 4 | 6 | 21 | 25 | −4 | 16 | |
| 12 | New Bradwell St Peter | 12 | 4 | 3 | 5 | 26 | 21 | +5 | 15 | |
| 13 | Rushden & Higham United | 15 | 4 | 3 | 8 | 27 | 41 | −14 | 15 | |
| 14 | Rothwell Corinthians | 15 | 3 | 5 | 7 | 23 | 30 | −7 | 14 | |
| 15 | Buckingham | 15 | 3 | 4 | 8 | 30 | 40 | −10 | 13 | |
| 16 | Letchworth Garden City Eagles | 11 | 3 | 3 | 5 | 19 | 23 | −4 | 12 | |
| 17 | Royston Town reserves | 18 | 3 | 3 | 12 | 21 | 56 | −35 | 12 | Possible relegation to feeder leagues |
| 18 | Huntingdon Town | 16 | 1 | 2 | 13 | 20 | 52 | −32 | 5 | Possible relegation to feeder leagues |
| 19 | Stotfold reserves | 16 | 1 | 1 | 14 | 9 | 46 | −37 | 4 | Possible relegation to feeder leagues |

Updated to match(es) played on 21 November 2026. Source: The FA Full-Time
Rules for classification: 1) points; 2) goal difference; 3) number of goals scored; 4) number of matches won; 5) head-to-head results

Reserve and U23 sides are ineligible for promotion to Step 5 or higher.

=== Results table ===
| Home \ Away | AMP | BUC | BUG | BPW | CRA | CGE | EAT | HUN | IRC | LAN | LEI | LGC | NBP | ROT | ROY | R&H | STO | WEL | WOO |
|---|---|---|---|---|---|---|---|---|---|---|---|---|---|---|---|---|---|---|---|
| Ampthill Town | — | | | | | | | | | | | | | | | | | | |
| Buckingham | | — | | | | | | | | | | | | | | | | | |
| Bugbrooke St Michaels | | | — | | | | | | | | | | | | | | | | |
| Burton Park Wanderers | | | | — | | | | | | | | | | | | | | | |
| Cranfield United | | | | | — | | | | | | | | | | | | | | |
| Crawley Green | | | | | | — | | | | | | | | | | | | | |
| Eaton Socon | | | | | | | — | | | | | | | | | | | | |
| Huntingdon Town | | | | | | | | — | | | | | | | | | | | |
| Irchester United | | | | | | | | | — | | | | | | | | | | |
| Langford | | | | | | | | | | — | | | | | | | | | |
| Leighton Town reserves | | | | | | | | | | | — | | | | | | | | |
| Letchworth Garden City Eagles | | | | | | | | | | | | — | | | | | | | |
| New Bradwell St Peter | | | | | | | | | | | | | — | | | | | | |
| Rothwell Corinthians | | | | | | | | | | | | | | — | | | | | |
| Royston Town reserves | | | | | | | | | | | | | | | — | | | | |
| Rushden & Higham United | | | | | | | | | | | | | | | | — | | | |
| Stotfold reserves | | | | | | | | | | | | | | | | | — | | |
| Wellingborough Whitworth | | | | | | | | | | | | | | | | | | — | |
| Woodford United | | | | | | | | | | | | | | | | | | | — |

Updated to match(es) played on unknown. Source: FA Full-Time Grid
Legend: Blue = home team win; Yellow = draw; Red = away team win.
For upcoming matches, an "a" indicates there is an article about the rivalry between the two participants.

=== Stadia and locations ===
}
Location of the clubs in the 2026–27 United Counties League Premier Division South
Locations of Division One clubs (Bedfordshire)

| Team | Location | Stadium | Capacity |
|---|---|---|---|
| Ampthill Town | Ampthill | Ampthill Park | 1,300 |
| Buckingham | Buckingham | Stratford Fields | |
| Bugbrooke St Michaels | Bugbrooke | Birds Close | 2,500 |
| Burton Park Wanderers | Burton Latimer | Latimer Park (groundshare with Kettering Town) | 3,029 |
| Cranfield United | Cranfield | Crawley Road | |
| Crawley Green | Luton | The Brache | 4,000 |
| Eaton Socon | Eaton Ford | River Road | |
| Huntingdon Town | Huntingdon | Jubilee Park | |
| Irchester United | Irchester | Alfred Street | 1,800 |
| Langford | Henlow | Forde Park | 2,800 |
| Leighton Town reserves | Leighton Buzzard | Bell Close | 2,800 |
| Letchworth Garden City Eagles | Letchworth Garden City | Pixmore Pitches | |
| New Bradwell St Peter | Milton Keynes (Bradville) | The Recreation Ground | 1,000 |
| Rothwell Corinthians | Rothwell | Desborough Road | |
| Royston Town reserves | Royston | Garden Walk | 5,000 |
| Rushden & Higham United | Rushden | Hayden Road | 1,500 |
| Stotfold reserves | Stotfold | The JSJ Stadium | 1,500 |
| Wellingborough Whitworth | Wellingborough | The Victoria Mill Ground | 2,140 |
| Woodford United | Woodford Halse | Byfield Road | 3,000 |

== Division Two ==
Spartan South Midlands Football League Division Two
- Season: 2026–27
- All statistics correct as of 2026.

This division comprises 19 teams

3 clubs left the division:

- Bovingdon - promoted to Combined Counties League Division One.
- Newport Pagnell Town development -
- Padbury Village - senior team folded.

5 clubs joined the division:

- London Colney, relegated from Division One
- Redbourn - new team
- Redbourn Rovers - promoted from Hertfordshire Senior County League Division Three
- Sun Sports - promoted from Hertfordshire Senior County League Division Three
- Winslow United development - transferred from Reserve Division.

=== League table ===
| Pos | Team | Pld | W | D | L | GF | GA | GD | Pts |
|---|---|---|---|---|---|---|---|---|---|
| 1 | Aston Clinton | 14 | 12 | 1 | 1 | 45 | 12 | +33 | 37 |
| 2 | Milton Keynes Irish reserves | 14 | 9 | 1 | 4 | 41 | 21 | +20 | 28 |
| 3 | Pitstone & Ivinghoe United | 11 | 9 | 1 | 1 | 25 | 11 | +14 | 28 |
| 4 | Winslow United development | 14 | 9 | 1 | 4 | 33 | 24 | +9 | 28 |
| 5 | Caddington | 11 | 9 | 0 | 2 | 31 | 13 | +18 | 27 |
| 6 | London Colney | 10 | 7 | 2 | 1 | 26 | 12 | +14 | 23 |
| 7 | Old Bradwell United | 15 | 6 | 5 | 4 | 25 | 20 | +5 | 23 |
| 8 | Codicote | 14 | 6 | 3 | 5 | 25 | 23 | +2 | 21 |
| 9 | Redbourn | 13 | 7 | 0 | 6 | 27 | 28 | −1 | 21 |
| 10 | Redbourn Rovers | 13 | 6 | 2 | 5 | 28 | 9 | +19 | 20 |
| 11 | Milton Keynes College | 13 | 6 | 0 | 7 | 19 | 22 | −3 | 18 |
| 12 | Stony Stratford Town | 15 | 6 | 0 | 9 | 25 | 33 | −8 | 18 |
| 13 | Harpenden Town development | 15 | 5 | 2 | 8 | 16 | 33 | −17 | 17 |
| 14 | Sun Sports Watford | 12 | 5 | 1 | 6 | 26 | 22 | +4 | 16 |
| 15 | Eynesbury United | 15 | 5 | 1 | 9 | 23 | 31 | −8 | 16 |
| 16 | Sarratt | 11 | 4 | 2 | 5 | 22 | 25 | −3 | 14 |
| 17 | Totternhoe | 14 | 2 | 0 | 12 | 14 | 36 | −22 | 6 |
| 18 | Tring Corinthians | 14 | 1 | 0 | 13 | 12 | 44 | −32 | 3 |
| 19 | The 61 (Luton) | 12 | 0 | 0 | 12 | 5 | 49 | −44 | 0 |

Updated to match(es) played on 21 November 2026. Source: The FA Full-Time
Rules for classification: 1) points; 2) goal difference; 3) number of goals scored; 4) number of matches won; 5) head-to-head results

=== Stadia and locations ===
Locations of Division Two clubs
Locations of clubs (Hertfordshire)
Locations of Division Two clubs (Buckinghamshire)

| Team | Location | Stadium | Capacity |
|---|---|---|---|
| Aston Clinton | Aston Clinton | London Road | 1,000 |
| Caddington | Caddington | Caddington Recreation Club | 1,000 |
| Codicote | Codicote | John Clements Memorial Ground | 1,000 |
| Eynesbury United | Eynesbury | The Alfred Hall Memorial Ground (Groundshare with Eynesbury Rovers) | 1,000 |
| Harpenden Town Development | Harpenden | Rothamsted Park | 1,000 |
| London Colney | London Colney | Cotlandswick Park | 1,000 |
| Milton Keynes College | Milton Keynes | Sport Central MK | |
| Milton Keynes Irish Reserves | Milton Keynes (Fenny Stratford) | Manor Fields | 1,000 |
| Old Bradwell United | Milton Keynes (Bradwell) | Abbey Road | 500 |
| Pitstone & Ivinghoe United | Pitstone | Pitstone Pavilion & Sports Hall | 1,500 |
| Redbourn | Redbourn | | |
| Redbourn Rovers | Redbourn | | |
| Sarratt | Sarratt | King Georges Field | 1,000 |
| Stony Stratford Town | Stony Stratford | Ostlers Lane | 1,000 |
| Sun Sports Watford | Watford | Sun Postal Sports & Social Club | 500 |
| The 61 (Luton) | Luton | Kingsway Ground | 1,500 |
| Totternhoe | Totternhoe | Totternhoe Recreation Ground | 500 |
| Tring Corinthians | Tring | Icknield Way | 500 |
| Winslow United Development | Winslow | Elmfields Gate | 2,000 |
