= 2022–23 Spartan South Midlands Football League =

The 2022–23 season was the 26th in the history of the Spartan South Midlands Football League, a football competition in England. The league operates three divisions, two of which are in covered in this article, the Premier Division, at Step 5 and Division One at Step 6 of the English football league system.

The league constitution for this season was based on allocations for Steps 5 and 6 that were announced by The Football Association on 12 May 2022, and were subject to appeals.

Leighton Town were champions, winning first Spartan South Midlands League title and returned to the Southern League after seven seasons in the Spartan South Midlands League. Runners-up Stotfold won inter-step play-off match and joined then achieving second straight promotion.

== Premier Division ==
Spartan South Midlands Football League Premier Division
- Season: 2022–23
- Champions: Leighton Town
- Promoted: Leighton Town; Stotfold
- Relegated: Hoddesdon Town; London Colney
- Matches: 380
- Goals: 1,249 (3.29 per match)

The Premier Division featured twelve clubs which competed in the division last season, along with eight new clubs.

- Transferred from the Essex Senior League:
  - Cockfosters
  - Hoddesdon Town
- Transferred from the United Counties League:
  - Biggleswade United
  - Potton United
- Promoted from Division One:
  - Shefford Town & Campton
  - Stotfold
- Plus:
  - Colney Heath, relegated from the Southern League
  - St Panteleimon, transferred from the Combined Counties League

=== League table ===
| Pos | Team | Pld | W | D | L | GF | GA | GD | Pts | Promotion, qualification or relegation |
|---|---|---|---|---|---|---|---|---|---|---|
| 1 | Leighton Town | 38 | 29 | 4 | 5 | 97 | 31 | +66 | 91 | Promoted to the Southern League |
| 2 | Stotfold | 38 | 22 | 11 | 5 | 69 | 33 | +36 | 77 | Qualified for an inter-step play-off, then promoted to the Southern League |
| 3 | Risborough Rangers | 38 | 23 | 5 | 10 | 100 | 56 | +44 | 74 | Transferred to the Combined Counties League |
| 4 | Dunstable Town | 38 | 21 | 11 | 6 | 75 | 37 | +38 | 74 | |
| 5 | St Panteleimon | 38 | 19 | 7 | 12 | 65 | 55 | +10 | 64 | |
| 6 | Cockfosters | 38 | 17 | 13 | 8 | 74 | 47 | +27 | 64 | |
| 7 | Leverstock Green | 38 | 15 | 12 | 11 | 60 | 51 | +9 | 57 | |
| 8 | Biggleswade United | 38 | 16 | 8 | 14 | 64 | 70 | −6 | 56 | |
| 9 | Tring Athletic | 38 | 15 | 9 | 14 | 59 | 60 | −1 | 54 | |
| 10 | Potton United | 38 | 14 | 11 | 13 | 51 | 47 | +4 | 53 | |
| 11 | Harpenden Town | 38 | 15 | 8 | 15 | 56 | 59 | −3 | 53 | |
| 12 | Crawley Green | 38 | 16 | 4 | 18 | 71 | 65 | +6 | 52 | |
| 13 | Aylesbury Vale Dynamos | 38 | 15 | 4 | 19 | 67 | 75 | −8 | 49 | |
| 14 | Ardley United | 38 | 13 | 9 | 16 | 70 | 69 | +1 | 48 | Transferred to the Combined Counties League |
| 15 | Shefford Town & Campton | 38 | 14 | 5 | 19 | 73 | 81 | −8 | 47 | |
| 16 | Baldock Town | 38 | 11 | 8 | 19 | 56 | 75 | −19 | 41 | |
| 17 | Arlesey Town | 38 | 8 | 9 | 21 | 39 | 66 | −27 | 33 | |
| 18 | Colney Heath | 38 | 8 | 6 | 24 | 34 | 76 | −42 | 30 | |
| 19 | Hoddesdon Town | 38 | 6 | 10 | 22 | 39 | 87 | −48 | 28 | Relegated to the Eastern Counties League |
| 20 | London Colney | 38 | 4 | 4 | 30 | 30 | 109 | −79 | 16 | Relegated to the Combined Counties League |

Source: The FA Full-Time
Rules for classification: 1) points; 2) goal difference; 3) number of goals scored; 4) number of matches won; 5) head-to-head results

=== Inter-step play-off ===
| 29 April 2023 | Dereham Town | 0–2 | Stotfold | Dereham |
| 15:00 GMT | | Report | Alleyne 5', 31' | Stadium: Aldiss Park; Attendance: 287 |

=== Stadia and locations ===
Locations of the Premier Division clubs
Locations of the Premier Division clubs (Hertfordshire)

| Team | Stadium | Capacity |
|---|---|---|
| Ardley United | The Playing Fields | 1,000 |
| Arlesey Town | Hitchin Road | 2,920 |
| Baldock Town | Hitchin Road | 2,920 |
| Aylesbury Vale Dynamos | Haywood Way | |
| Biggleswade United | Fairfield Road | 2,000 |
| Cockfosters | Chalk Lane | 1,000 |
| Colney Heath | Recreation Ground | |
| Crawley Green | The Brache | 4,000 |
| Dunstable Town | Creasey Park | 3,065 |
| Harpenden Town | Rothamsted Park | |
| Hoddesdon Town | Lowfield | 3,000 |
| Leighton Town | Bell Close | 2,800 |
| Leverstock Green | Pancake Lane | |
| London Colney | Cotlandswick Park | 1,000 |
| Potton United | The Hollow | |
| Risborough Rangers | The KAMTECH Stadium | 1,500 |
| Shefford Town & Campton | Shefford Sports Club | 1,000 |
| St Panteleimon | Hertingfordbury Park (groundshare with Hertford Town) | |
| Stotfold | The JSJ Stadium | 1,500 |
| Tring Athletic | Grass Roots Stadium | |

== Division One ==
Spartan South Midlands Football League Division One
- Season: 2022–23
- Champions: Real Bedford
- Promoted: Real Bedford; Rugby Borough
- Relegated: London Tigers; Thame Rangers
- Matches: 380
- Goals: 1,496 (3.94 per match)

Division One featured 14 clubs which competed in the division last season, along with six new clubs:

- Eaton Socon, promoted from the Cambridgeshire County League
- Holmer Green, relegated from the Premier Division
- Lutterworth Athletic, transferred from the United Counties League
- Moulton, promoted from the Northamptonshire Combination League
- Northampton ON Chenecks, relegated from the United Counties League
- Rugby Borough, promoted from the Leicestershire Senior League

Also, Bedford changed their name to Real Bedford.

=== League table ===
| Pos | Team | Pld | W | D | L | GF | GA | GD | Pts | Promotion, qualification or relegation |
|---|---|---|---|---|---|---|---|---|---|---|
| 1 | Real Bedford | 38 | 32 | 3 | 3 | 123 | 29 | +94 | 99 | Promoted to the Premier Division |
| 2 | Northampton ON Chenecks | 38 | 28 | 6 | 4 | 102 | 37 | +65 | 90 | Qualified for the play-offs |
| 3 | Rugby Borough | 38 | 26 | 2 | 10 | 129 | 53 | +76 | 80 | Qualified for the play-offs, then promoted to the United Counties League |
| 4 | Amersham Town | 38 | 22 | 10 | 6 | 100 | 52 | +48 | 76 | Qualified for the play-offs, then transferred to the Combined Counties League |
| 5 | Northampton Sileby Rangers | 38 | 25 | 1 | 12 | 109 | 71 | +38 | 76 | Qualified for the play-offs |
| 6 | Ampthill Town | 38 | 21 | 7 | 10 | 80 | 47 | +33 | 70 | |
| 7 | Lutterworth Athletic | 38 | 21 | 4 | 13 | 82 | 63 | +19 | 67 | Transferred to the United Counties League |
| 8 | Moulton | 38 | 19 | 4 | 15 | 97 | 77 | +20 | 61 | |
| 9 | Winslow United | 38 | 16 | 6 | 16 | 70 | 62 | +8 | 54 | |
| 10 | Eaton Socon | 38 | 15 | 9 | 14 | 60 | 64 | −4 | 54 | |
| 11 | Burton Park Wanderers | 38 | 13 | 7 | 18 | 60 | 75 | −15 | 46 | |
| 12 | Letchworth Garden City Eagles | 38 | 12 | 6 | 20 | 52 | 69 | −17 | 42 | |
| 13 | Wellingborough Whitworth | 38 | 11 | 7 | 20 | 65 | 92 | −27 | 40 | |
| 14 | Rushden & Higham United | 38 | 10 | 7 | 21 | 57 | 102 | −45 | 37 | |
| 15 | Raunds Town | 38 | 11 | 4 | 23 | 43 | 94 | −51 | 37 | |
| 16 | Holmer Green | 38 | 10 | 6 | 22 | 55 | 111 | −56 | 36 | Transferred to the Combined Counties League |
| 17 | Buckingham Athletic | 38 | 7 | 13 | 18 | 51 | 97 | −46 | 34 | Merged into Buckingham |
| 18 | Langford | 38 | 10 | 3 | 25 | 54 | 82 | −28 | 33 | |
| 19 | London Tigers | 38 | 7 | 6 | 25 | 57 | 106 | −49 | 27 | Relegated to the Middlesex County League |
| 20 | Thame Rangers | 38 | 7 | 3 | 28 | 50 | 113 | −63 | 24 | Relegated to the Oxfordshire Senior League |

Source: The FA Full-Time
Rules for classification: 1) points; 2) goal difference; 3) number of goals scored; 4) number of matches won; 5) head-to-head results

=== Play-offs ===
Semi-finals
2 | Northampton ON Chenecks | 1 (5)
5 | Northampton Sileby Rangers | 1 (4)
3 | Rugby Borough | 4
4 | Amersham Town | 0

Final
2 | Northampton ON Chenecks | 0
3 | Rugby Borough | 2

==== Semifinals ====
| 25 April 2023 | Northampton ON Chenecks | 1–1 (a.e.t.) (5–4 p) | Northampton Sileby Rangers | Northampton |
| | | | | Stadium: The Old Northamptonians Sports Ground; Attendance: 250 |

| 26 April 2023 | Rugby Borough | 4–0 | Amersham Town | Rugby |
| | | | | Stadium: Kilsby Lane; Attendance: 261 |

==== Final ====
| 29 April 2023 | Northampton ON Chenecks | 0–2 | Rugby Borough | Northampton |
| | | | | Stadium: The Old Northamptonians Sports Ground; Attendance: 200 |

=== Stadia and locations ===
Locations of Division One clubs
Locations of Division One clubs (Northamptonshire)

| Team | Stadium | Capacity |
|---|---|---|
| Amersham Town | Spratleys Meadow | 1,500 |
| London Tigers | Spratleys Meadow | 1,500 |
| Ampthill Town | Ampthill Park | 1,300 |
| Buckingham Athletic | Stratford Fields | |
| Burton Park Wanderers | Latimer Park (groundshare with Kettering Town) | |
| Eaton Socon | River Road | |
| Holmer Green | Watchet Lane | |
| Langford | Forde Park | 2,800 |
| Letchworth Garden City Eagles | Pixmore Pitches | |
| Lutterworth Athletic | Canal Street (groundshare with Leicester St Andrews) | 1,000 |
| Moulton | Brunting Road | |
| Northampton ON Chenecks | Old Northamptonians Sports Ground | |
| Northampton Sileby Rangers | Fernie Fields | |
| Raunds Town | Kiln Park | |
| Real Bedford | McMullen Park | |
| Rugby Borough | Kilsby Lane | |
| Rushden & Higham United | Hayden Road | 1,500 |
| Thame Rangers | Meadow View Park | 2,000 |
| Wellingborough Whitworth | The Victoria Mill Ground | 2,140 |
| Winslow United | Elmfields Gate | 2,000 |

== Division Two ==
Spartan South Midlands Football League Division Two
- Season: 2022–23
- Champions: Old Bradwell United
- Promoted: Leighton Town development
- Matches: 272
- Goals: 1,175 (4.32 per match)

Division Two featured 15 clubs which competed in the division last season, along with two new clubs:

- AFC Caddington
- Leighton Town development

=== League table ===
| Pos | Team | Pld | W | D | L | GF | GA | GD | Pts | Promotion |
|---|---|---|---|---|---|---|---|---|---|---|
| 1 | Old Bradwell United | 32 | 27 | 0 | 5 | 135 | 28 | +107 | 81 | |
| 2 | New Bradwell St Peter | 32 | 24 | 1 | 7 | 96 | 39 | +57 | 73 | |
| 3 | Leighton Town development | 32 | 23 | 4 | 5 | 89 | 37 | +52 | 73 | Promoted to Division One |
| 4 | Totternhoe | 32 | 21 | 7 | 4 | 90 | 41 | +49 | 70 | |
| 5 | Aston Clinton | 32 | 20 | 2 | 10 | 69 | 44 | +25 | 62 | |
| 6 | Milton Keynes College Football Academy | 32 | 16 | 6 | 10 | 77 | 59 | +18 | 54 | |
| 7 | Eynesbury United | 32 | 17 | 3 | 12 | 83 | 69 | +14 | 54 | |
| 8 | Sarratt | 32 | 14 | 5 | 13 | 49 | 54 | −5 | 47 | |
| 9 | Codicote | 32 | 13 | 7 | 12 | 76 | 60 | +16 | 46 | |
| 10 | Bovingdon | 32 | 12 | 6 | 14 | 64 | 63 | +1 | 42 | |
| 11 | Berkhamsted Raiders | 32 | 10 | 9 | 13 | 67 | 65 | +2 | 39 | |
| 12 | Pitstone & Ivinghoe | 32 | 11 | 5 | 16 | 74 | 73 | +1 | 38 | |
| 13 | AFC Caddington | 32 | 7 | 5 | 20 | 55 | 79 | −24 | 26 | |
| 14 | Risborough Rangers development | 32 | 8 | 2 | 22 | 48 | 86 | −38 | 26 | Resigned from the league |
| 15 | Tring Corinthians | 32 | 7 | 4 | 21 | 37 | 83 | −46 | 25 | |
| 16 | Buckingham United | 32 | 6 | 1 | 25 | 49 | 114 | −65 | 19 | Merged into Buckingham |
| 17 | The 61 | 32 | 2 | 1 | 29 | 17 | 181 | −164 | 7 | |

Source: FA Full-Time
Rules for classification: 1) points; 2) goal difference; 3) number of goals scored.
