= Ashley Hay (footballer) =

English footballer (2003)

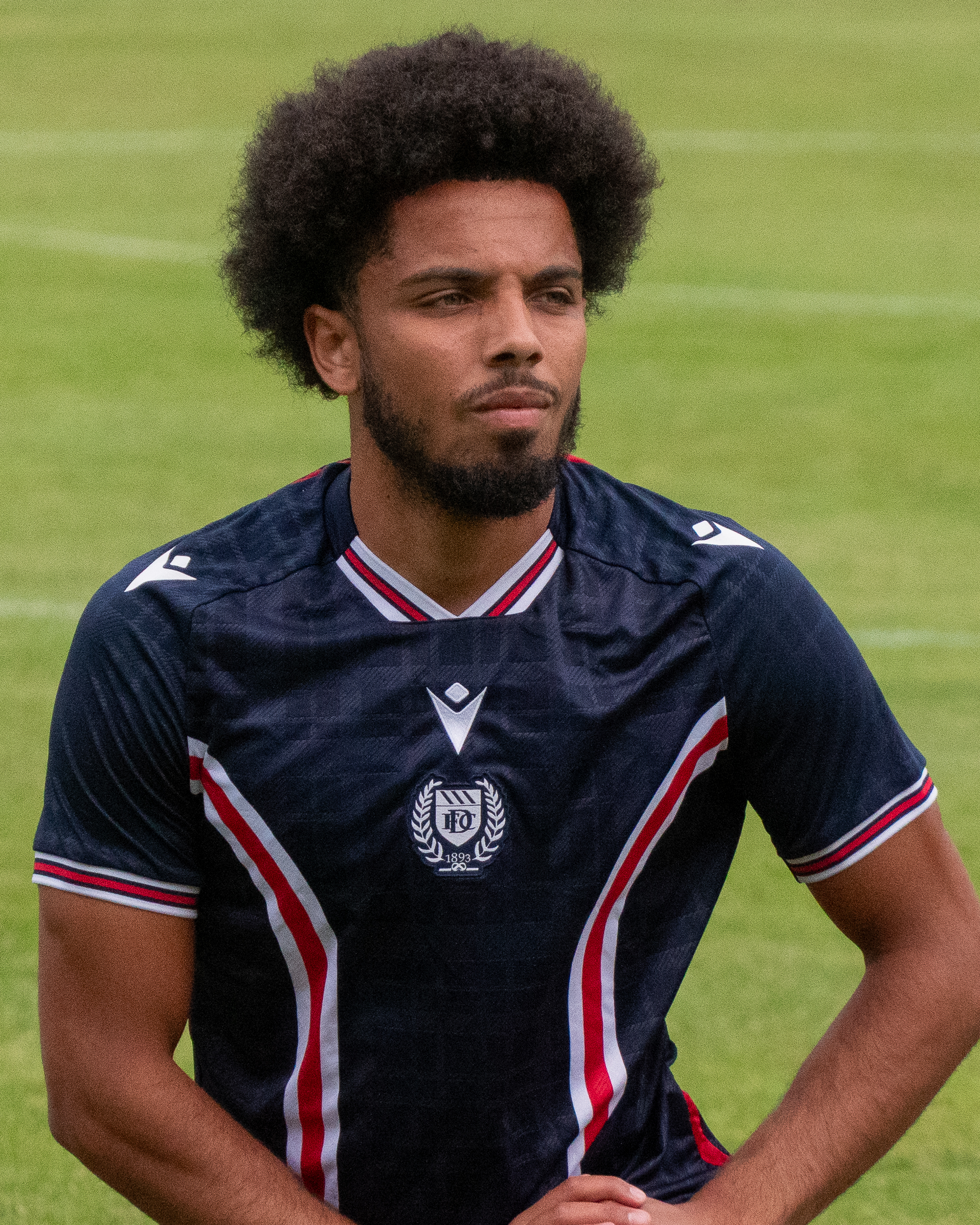
- Hay warming up for Dundee in 2025

Personal information
- Full name: Ashley Stephen Thomas Hay
- Date of birth: 10 July 2003 (age 23)
- Place of birth: Stevenage, England
- Height: 1.81 m (5 ft 11 in)
- Position: Forward

Team information
- Current team: Dundee
- Number: 11

Youth career
- Luton Town
- Hitchin Town
- Letchworth Garden City Eagles

Senior career*
Years	Team	Apps	(Gls)
2020–2022	Baldock Town	45	(24)
2022	Biggleswade Town	4	(1)
2022	Baldock Town	1	(0)
2022–2023	Hitchin Town	34	(8)
2023–2025	Brentford	0	(0)
2025	→ Cheltenham Town (loan)	21	(3)
2025–	Dundee	37	(7)
- * Club domestic league appearances and goals as of 21:51, 21 November 2026 (UTC)

Ashley Stephen Thomas Hay (born 10 July 2003) is an English professional footballer who plays as a forward for Scottish Premiership club Dundee.

Hay is a product of the Luton Town academy and began his senior career in non-League football in 2020. He transferred to Brentford B in 2023 and played his first professional senior football on loan at Cheltenham Town.

== Career ==
=== Non-League football ===
A forward, Hay began his career with spells in the Luton Town academy, the Hitchin Town youth system and with Letchworth Garden City Eagles. He began his senior career with Spartan South Midlands League Premier Division club Baldock Town in August 2020. Hay scored 35 goals in 64 appearances, prior to moving up a step to transfer to Southern League Premier Division Central club Biggleswade Town in July 2022. Following a short spell in which he scored one goal in seven appearances, Hay transferred across the division to return to Hitchin Town in September 2022. He scored 11 goals in 39 appearances during a 2022–23 season in which he was voted the club's Supporters' Player of the Year. Shortly after re-signing for the 2023–24 season, Hay departed the club.

=== Brentford ===
On 31 August 2023, following a successful trial, Hay transferred to the B team at Premier League club Brentford. He signed a contract running until January 2024 and later signed an extension until the end of the 2023–24 season. Hay finished the 2023–24 season tied with Iwan Morgan as the B team's leading goalscorer, with 9 goals. He also captained the team on occasion during the season. Hay signed a new two-year contract, with the option of a further year, in June 2024.

Following a first team friendly appearance and 14 goals in 15 appearances for the B team during the first half of the 2024–25 season, Hay joined League Two club Cheltenham Town on loan for the remainder of the season on 1 January 2025. He made 23 appearances and scored three goals during his spell. Following the expiry of the loan, Hay played in the remainder of Brentford B's season and was part of the 2024–25 Professional Development League-winning squad. He transferred out of the club in July 2025.

=== Dundee ===
On 4 July 2025, Hay transferred to Scottish Premiership club Dundee and signed a two-year contract, for an undisclosed fee. The move reunited him with head coach Steven Pressley, formerly Head of Individual Development at Brentford. On 30 December 2025, Hay scored his first goal for the club in a home win over Kilmarnock.

== Personal life ==
While a non-League footballer, Hay worked in McDonald's and undertook an apprenticeship as a plumber. While a Brentford player, he shared accommodation with teammate Benjamin Arthur.

== Career statistics ==
As of match played 21 November 2026

Appearances and goals by club, season and competition
Club	Season	League			National cup (Note: Includes FA Cup, Scottish Cup)		League cup (Note: Includes EFL Cup, Scottish League Cup)		Other		Total	
Club	Season	Division	Apps	Goals	Apps	Goals	Apps	Goals	Apps	Goals	Apps	Goals
Baldock Town	2020–21	Spartan South Midlands League Premier Division	10	5	0	0	―		7 (Note: Five appearances and four goals in Spartan South Midlands League Spring Cup, two appearances and one goal in FA Vase)	5	17	10
Baldock Town	2021–22	Spartan South Midlands League Premier Division	35	19	4	1	―		8 (Note: Three appearances in FA Vase, two appearances and three goals in Spartan South Midlands League Premier Division Cup, two appearances and two goals in Spartan South Midlands League Challenge Trophy, one appearance in Herts Charity Cup)	5	47	25
Baldock Town	Total		45	24	4	1	0	0	15	10	64	35
Biggleswade Town	2022–23	Southern League Premier Division Central	4	1	2	0	―		1 (Note: Appearance in FA Trophy)	0	7	1
Baldock Town	2022–23	Spartan South Midlands League Premier Division	1	0	―		―		0	0	1	0
Hitchin Town	2022–23	Southern League Premier Division Central	34	8	―		―		5 (Note: Appearances in Herts Senior Cup)	3	39	11
Hitchin Town	2023–24	Southern League Premier Division Central	0	0	―		―		0	0	0	0
Hitchin Town	Total		34	8	0	0	0	0	5	3	39	11
Brentford	2023–24	Premier League	0	0	0	0	0	0	―		0	0
Brentford	2024–25	Premier League	0	0	0	0	0	0	―		0	0
Brentford	Total		0	0	0	0	0	0	0	0	0	0
Cheltenham Town (loan)	2024–25	League Two	21	3	―		―		2 (Note: Appearances in EFL Trophy)	0	23	3
Dundee	2025–26	Scottish Premiership	29	4	1	1	4	0	―		34	5
Dundee	2026–27	Scottish Premiership	8	3	0	0	4	2	―		12	5
Dundee	Total		37	7	1	1	8	2	0	0	46	10
Career total			141	43	7	2	8	2	23	13	178	60

== Honours ==
Individual

- Hitchin Town Supporters' Player of the Year: 2022–23
