= Josh Coley =

English footballer (born 1998)

Personal information
- Full name: Joshua Maxwell Coley
- Date of birth: 24 July 1998 (age 28)
- Place of birth: Stevenage, England
- Height: 5 ft 10 in (1.78 m)
- Position: Winger

Team information
- Current team: Maidenhead United
- Number: 7

Youth career
- Norwich City

Senior career*
Years	Team	Apps	(Gls)
2014–2015	Arlesey Town Reserves	12	(0)
2015–2016	Letchworth Garden City Eagles		
2016–2018	Hitchin Town	9	(0)
2016	→ Histon (loan)	5	(0)
2017	→ Arlesey Town (loan)		
2017	→ Langford (loan)	1	(0)
2017–2018	→ Baldock Town (loan)	35	(17)
2018–2020	Norwich City	0	(0)
2019–2020	→ Dunfermline Athletic (loan)	7	(0)
2020	Stotfold	5	(2)
2020–2021	Maidenhead United	37	(5)
2021–2023	Exeter City	27	(0)
2022–2023	→ Harrogate Town (loan)	11	(0)
2023–2025	Sutton United	72	(8)
2025–2026	Ebbsfleet United	42	(4)
2026–	Maidenhead United	15	(2)
- * Club domestic league appearances and goals as of 17:47, 22 November 2026 (UTC)

Joshua Maxwell Coley (born 24 July 1998) is an English footballer who plays as a winger for Maidenhead United.

== Career ==
Coley was born in Stevenage but grew up in York. He was in the youth team at York City before returning south. Coley began his senior career in the Spartan South Midlands Football League with Arlesey Town Reserves, before moving on to Letchworth Garden City Eagles in the Herts Senior County League.

In 2016 he joined Southern Football League side Hitchin Town. Coley only made a handful of appearances for the Canaries, and spent most of his time out on loan with Histon, Arlesey Town, Langford and Baldock Town, where he scored 21 goals in all competitions in the 2017–18 season, combining non-league football with working as a bricklayer.

After impressing in a trial, he signed a one-year deal with Norwich City in July 2018, and featured regularly for their under-23 side, scoring once in twenty appearances. Coley's contract was extended for another year in February 2019.

In June 2019, he joined Scottish Championship club Dunfermline Athletic on a year-long loan deal, with his first appearance coming in a Scottish League Cup match with St Mirren where he played the full 90 minutes of his side's 3–2 victory. Coley briefly returned to Norwich in January 2020, before having his contract cancelled by mutual consent in February. Shortly after, he signed for Spartan South Midlands Football League side Stotfold.

In July 2020, Coley signed for National League side Maidenhead United. On 12 October 2020, he scored his first goal for the club to give his side their first win of the season against Wrexham.

On 8 June 2021, it was announced that Coley had signed for Exeter City on a two-year deal for an undisclosed fee.

On 1 September 2022, he joined EFL League Two's Harrogate Town on loan until the end of the 2022–23 season. Coley was recalled in January 2023.

On 30 June 2023, Coley signed for League Two club Sutton United for an undisclosed fee. He scored ten goals in 89 games for Sutton.

Coley played for Ebbsfleet United in the 2025-26 season before re-joining Maidenhead in the summer of 2026.

== Career statistics ==
As of 21 November 2026

Appearances and goals by club, season and competition
Club	Season	League			FA Cup		League Cup		Other		Total	
Club	Season	Division	Apps	Goals	Apps	Goals	Apps	Goals	Apps	Goals	Apps	Goals
Arlesey Town Reserves	2014–15	SSML Division One	12	0	0	0	0	0	3 (Note: Two appearances and one goal in SSML Division One Cup; one appearance in SSML Challenge Trophy)	1	15	1
Letchworth Eagles	2015–16	HSCL Premier Division	No data currently available									
Hitchin Town	2016–17	Southern League Premier Division	8	0	1	0	0	0	2 (Note: One appearance in Southern League Cup; one appearance in Herts Charity Cup)	0	11	0
Hitchin Town	2017–18	Southern League Premier Division	1	0	0	0	0	0	0	0	1	0
Hitchin Town	Total		9	0	1	0	0	0	2	0	12	0
Histon (loan)	2016–17	Southern League Division One Central	5	0	0	0	0	0	1 (Note: One appearance in Cambridgeshire Invitation Cup)	0	6	0
Arlesey Town (loan)	2016–17	Southern League Division One Central	No data currently available									
Langford (loan)	2017–18	SSML Division One	1	0	0	0	0	0	—		1	0
Baldock Town (loan)	2017–18	SSML Division One	35	17	2	0	0	0	11 (Note: Three appearances and one goal in FA Vase, four appearances and two goals in Herts Centenary Trophy, two appearances and one goal in SSML Division One Cup, one appearance in Herts Charity Shield, one appearance in SSML Challenge Trophy)	4	48	21
Norwich City	2018–19	EFL Championship	0	0	0	0	0	0	—		0	0
Norwich City	2019–20	Premier League	0	0	0	0	0	0	—		0	0
Norwich City	Total		0	0	0	0	0	0	0	0	0	0
Dunfermline Athletic (loan)	2019–20	Scottish Championship	7	0	0	0	4	1	0	0	11	1
Stotfold	2019–20	SSML Division One	5	2	0	0	0	0	2 (Note: One appearance and two goals in SSML Division One Cup; one appearance in Bedfordshire Senior Trophy)	2	7	4
Maidenhead United	2020–21	National League	37	5	1	0	—		1 (Note: Appearances in FA Trophy)	0	39	5
Exeter City	2021–22	EFL League Two	18	0	2	0	0	0	3 (Note: Appearances in EFL Trophy)	2	23	2
Exeter City	2022–23	EFL League One	9	0	0	0	2	1	1	0	12	1
Exeter City	Total		27	0	2	0	2	1	4	2	35	3
Harrogate Town (loan)	2022–23	EFL League Two	11	0	2	1	0	0	0	0	13	1
Sutton United	2023–24	EFL League Two	39	3	3	0	3	0	3	0	48	3
Sutton United	2024–25	National League	33	5	2	1	—		6 (Note: Four appearances in FA Trophy; two appearances and one goal in National League Cup)	1	41	7
Sutton United	Total		72	8	5	1	3	0	9	1	89	10
Ebbsfleet United	2025–26	National League South	41	4	3	0	—		3	0	47	4
Maidenhead United	2026–27	National League South	15	2	0	0	—		2 (Note: One appearance in FA Trophy, one appearance Berks & Bucks Senior Cup)	0	17	2
Career Total			212	38	16	2	9	2	38	10	275	52

== Honours ==
Exeter City

- EFL League Two second-place promotion: 2021–22
