= 2025–26 Spartan South Midlands Football League =

The 2025–26 season is the 29th in the history of the Spartan South Midlands Football League, a football competition in England. The league operates three divisions, the Premier Division at Step 5, Division One at Step 6, and Division Two at Step 7, of the English football league system.

The constitution was announced on 15 May 2025.

== Premier Division ==
Spartan South Midlands Football League Premier Division
- Season: 2025–26
- Champions: Haringey Borough
- Promoted: Haringey Borough
- Relegated: Crawley Green
- Matches: 380
- Goals: 1,274 (3.35 per match)
- Top goalscorer: (England) Louie Collier (Kings Langley) (34 goals)
- Biggest home win: Kings Langley 8–0 Baldock Town (17 January 2026)
- Biggest away win: Sawbridgeworth Town 1–7 Haringey Borough (7 October 2025); Dunstable Town 0–6 Harlow Town (14 October 2025); Dunstable Town 0–6 Sawbridgeworth Town (31 January 2026)
- Highest scoring: Kings Langley 7–2 Kempston Rovers (29 November 2025); Haringey Borough 8–1 Crawley Green (20 December 2025); Harlow Town 3–6 Haringey Borough (24 February 2026); Aylesbury Vale Dynamos 4–5 Wormley Rovers (24 February 2026)

The Premier Division featured 14 clubs which competed in the division last season, along with six new clubs:

- AFC Welwyn, promoted from Division One
- Haringey Borough, relegated from the Isthmian League North Division
- Harlow Town, promoted from the Eastern Counties League Division One South
- Kings Langley, relegated from the Southern League Division One Central
- Risborough Rangers, transferred from the Combined Counties League Premier Division North
- Sawbridgeworth Town, transferred from the Essex Senior League

=== League table ===
Pos	Team	Pld	W	D	L	GF	GA	GD	Pts	Promotion, qualification or relegation
1	Haringey Borough (C, P)	38	25	9	4	96	39	+57	84	Promoted to the Southern League Division One Central
2	Winslow United (O, P)	38	27	3	8	103	49	+54	84	Qualified for the play-offs
3	Risborough Rangers	38	25	6	7	88	50	+38	81	Qualified for the play-offs
4	Cockfosters	38	22	9	7	56	31	+25	75	Qualified for the play-offs
5	Kings Langley	38	23	5	10	84	42	+42	74	Qualified for the play-offs
6	Biggleswade United	38	19	13	6	76	52	+24	70	
7	Tring Athletic	38	19	8	11	78	50	+28	65	
8	Sawbridgeworth Town	38	17	6	15	74	68	+6	57	
9	Harpenden Town	38	15	8	15	79	67	+12	50 (Note: On 7 April 2026, Harpenden Town were deducted 3 points for fielding an inelgible player in the match vs. Aylesbury Vale Dynamos on 7 March 2026.)	
10	Arlesey Town	38	15	4	19	58	66	−8	49	
11	Wormley Rovers	38	15	3	20	57	70	−13	48	
12	AFC Welwyn	38	13	9	16	56	61	−5	47 (Note: During the game between AFC Welwyn and Potton United on 24 January 2026, AFC Welwyn fielded an ineligible player. This resulted in the game being awarded to Potton United and AFC Welwyn were deducted 1 point)	
13	Colney Heath	38	12	10	16	44	56	−12	46	
14	Aylesbury Vale Dynamos	38	12	5	21	49	68	−19	41	
15	Baldock Town	38	10	7	21	52	85	−33	37	
16	Harlow Town	38	12	9	17	51	63	−12	35 (Note: Harlow Town were deducted 10 points due to entering administration.)	
17	Dunstable Town	38	7	10	21	49	88	−39	31	Merged with AFC Dunstable into Dunstable
18	Potton United	38	6	12	20	42	76	−34	30	
19	Kempston Rovers	38	6	8	24	37	82	−45	26	Reprived from relegation
20	Crawley Green (R)	38	4	8	26	45	111	−66	20	Relegated to Division One

Source: The FA Full-Time
Rules for classification: 1) points; 2) goal difference; 3) number of goals scored; 4) number of matches won; 5) head-to-head results
(C) Champions; (O) Play-off winners; (P) Promoted; (R) Relegated

=== Play-offs ===
Semi-finals
2	Winslow United	2
5	Kings Langley	1
3	Risborough Rangers	0
4	Cockfosters	1

Final
2	Winslow United	2
4	Cockfosters	0

==== Semifinals ====
29 April 2026	Winslow United	2–1	Kings Langley	Winslow
19:45	Wooley 2'; Scott 64'		Hilaire 90'	Stadium: Elmfields Gate; Attendance: 785; Referee: Jacob Emanuel

29 April 2026	Risborough Rangers	0–1	Cockfosters	Princes Risborough
19:45		Report	Robertson 19'	Stadium: The KAMTECH Stadium, Windsor Playing Fields; Attendance: 382; Referee: Patrick Yates

==== Final ====
4 May 2026	Winslow United	2–0	Cockfosters	Winslow
15:00 GMT	Attwell; King	Report		Stadium: Elmfields Gate; Attendance: 1,006; Referee: Joseph Casey

=== Results table ===
Home \ Away	WLW	ARL	AVD	BAL	BGU	COC	COL	CRA	DUN	HGB	HRW	HPT	KEM	KLL	POT	RIS	SAW	TRI	WIN	WOR
AFC Welwyn	—	2–3	3–2	3–0	0–2	2–2	5–1	3–4	0–2	2–0	1–1	0–3	1–1	0–0	0–0	A/W	3–2	0–2	2–3	2–2
Arlesey Town	1–2	—	4–1	1–2	3–4	1–1	0–2	2–2	4–0	1–0	0–2	1–0	1–3	2–1	4–2	2–3	1–2	0–1	1–2	5–0
Aylesbury Vale Dynamos	2–1	2–0	—	2–1	0–3	0–1	3–0	3–0	4–0	0–0	1–2	1–3	0–2	0–2	2–1	0–2	0–1	0–2	3–2	4–5
Baldock Town	1–2	1–0	1–3	—	3–0	1–3	0–1	0–1	3–3	1–4	0–3	3–3	2–0	0–1	2–1	2–3	4–2	4–4	1–4	0–1
Biggleswade United	2–1	0–2	2–0	1–1	—	2–3	1–1	2–0	4–0	0–0	1–1	3–0	2–1	3–2	1–1	1–2	2–1	2–2	2–2	1–0
Cockfosters	1–1	3–1	0–0	1–1	1–4	—	1–0	4–1	1–0	0–0	0–1	0–3	4–0	1–1	1–0	3–1	0–2	1–0	2–1	3–1
Colney Heath	0–0	1–4	1–2	1–1	0–1	0–0	—	3–1	1–0	2–4	2–2	1–1	3–1	0–2	4–1	1–2	0–0	1–1	1–2	4–1
Crawley Green	1–2	1–2	2–3	1–3	4–4	0–2	0–0	—	2–1	2–5	0–2	1–5	3–1	1–3	0–4	0–3	1–3	1–5	1–4	1–1
Dunstable Town	1–2	6–0	1–0	1–3	2–4	0–2	1–2	1–1	—	2–2	0–6	4–2	1–0	0–1	3–1	1–1	0–6	0–0	1–4	2–3
Haringey Borough	2–1	5–0	3–0	2–1	2–2	0–2	1–0	8–1	1–1	—	1–1	2–1	3–1	2–1	4–0	1–1	5–3	2–1	2–1	4–0
Harlow Town	1–3	1–1	2–2	2–0	0–2	0–1	0–2	2–2	2–3	3–6	—	1–1	4–2	1–2	2–1	2–3	0–2	0–1	2–1	1–0
Harpenden Town	2–1	0–2	3–2	1–1	0–3	1–0	6–1	5–0	3–3	2–2	4–0	—	3–0	0–1	5–2	2–3	1–3	3–1	2–5	0–2
Kempston Rovers	0–2	0–1	1–0	0–2	3–3	0–2	2–1	0–0	1–1	0–1	2–0	1–1	—	0–4	1–1	0–5	2–3	1–3	1–4	1–1
Kings Langley	2–0	4–1	4–1	8–0	2–2	0–1	0–1	6–1	4–0	0–3	3–0	1–0	7–2	—	2–2	0–4	4–1	4–3	0–1	3–2
Potton United	2–2	0–1	1–1	1–2	0–4	1–0	0–0	1–0	0–0	0–3	3–1	1–6	2–2	0–3	—	0–0	2–1	1–5	1–2	3–1
Risborough Rangers	3–1	2–1	4–1	2–1	1–1	0–3	3–0	4–3	4–4	2–3	3–0	4–4	3–1	0–1	2–1	—	5–0	3–2	1–2	5–1
Sawbridgeworth Town	1–2	1–1	3–0	4–2	1–1	3–4	1–2	3–3	6–0	1–7	1–1	0–1	1–2	0–2	2–2	2–0	—	2–1	3–2	1–0
Tring Athletic	4–0	0–2	3–0	5–1	1–2	0–0	1–0	4–2	3–2	3–1	0–2	3–1	2–1	1–1	2–2	1–2	3–1	—	2–2	4–0
Winslow United	2–3	4–1	1–1	4–0	8–2	2–0	4–2	4–0	1–0	0–4	4–0	5–0	4–1	3–2	4–1	1–0	0–2	3–1	—	2–1
Wormley Rovers	3–1	3–1	1–3	6–1	1–0	0–2	1–2	3–1	4–2	0–1	2–0	3–1	1–0	3–0	1–0	1–2	2–3	0–1	0–3	—

Source: FA Full-Time Grid
Legend: Blue = home team win; Yellow = draw; Red = away team win.
For upcoming matches, an "a" indicates there is an article about the rivalry between the two participants.

=== Stadia and locations ===
Locations of the Premier Division clubs
Locations of the Premier Division clubs (Hertfordshire)
Locations of the Premier Division clubs

Team	Location	Stadium	Capacity
AFC Welwyn	Welwyn Garden City	Vauxhall Road (groundshare with Hemel Hempstead Town)	3,152
Arlesey Town	Arlesey	Hitchin Road	2,920
Baldock Town	Baldock	Hitchin Road	2,920
Aylesbury Vale Dynamos	Aylesbury	Haywood Way	
Biggleswade United	Biggleswade	Fairfield Road	2,000
Cockfosters	London (Cockfosters)	Chalk Lane	1,000
Colney Heath	Colney Heath	Recreation Ground	
Crawley Green	Luton	The Brache	4,000
Dunstable Town	Dunstable	Creasey Park	3,065
Haringey Borough	London (Tottenham)	Coles Park	2,500
Harlow Town	Harlow	The Harlow Arena	3,500
Harpenden Town	Harpenden	Rothamsted Park	
Kempston Rovers	Kempston	Hillgrounds Leisure	2,000
Kings Langley	Kings Langley	Sadiku Stadium	1,963
Potton United	Potton	The Hollow	
Risborough Rangers	Princes Risborough	The KAMTECH Stadium	1,500
Sawbridgeworth Town	Sawbridgeworth	Crofters End	2,500
Tring Athletic	Tring	Grass Roots Stadium	
Winslow United	Winslow	Elmfields Gate	2,000
Wormley Rovers	Wormley	Wormley Playing Fields	500

== Division One ==
Spartan South Midlands Football League Division One
- Season: 2025–26
- Champions: Everett Rovers
- Promoted: Everett Rovers
- Matches: 420
- Goals: 1,518 (3.61 per match)
- Biggest home win: Desborough Town 9–0 Huntingdon Town (1 November 2025)
- Biggest away win: Royston Town reserves 0–6 Everett Rovers (17 January 2026)
- Highest scoring: Desborough Town 8–3 Shefford Town & Campton (4 October 2025)
- All statistics correct as of 9 March 2026.

Division One featured seventeen clubs which competed in the division last season, along with four new clubs:

- Belstone, transferred from the Combined Counties League Division One
- Everett Rovers, promoted from the Herts Senior County League
- New Bradwell St Peter, promoted from Division Two
- Shefford Town & Campton, relegated from the Premier Division

=== League table ===
Pos	Team	Pld	W	D	L	GF	GA	GD	Pts	Promotion, qualification or relegation
1	Everett Rovers (C, P)	40	30	5	5	136	49	+87	95	Promoted to the Premier Division
2	Desborough Town (O, P)	40	29	4	7	111	41	+70	91	Qualified for the play-offs
3	Eaton Socon	40	29	1	10	88	45	+43	88	Qualified for the play-offs
4	Ampthill Town	40	26	5	9	86	40	+46	83	Qualified for the play-offs
5	Stotfold reserves	40	23	5	12	82	51	+31	74	
6	Belstone	40	22	4	14	87	59	+28	70	Qualified for the play-offs, then transferred to the Combined Counties League Division One
7	New Bradwell St Peter	40	19	9	12	78	76	+2	66	
8	Wellingborough Whitworth	40	19	7	14	85	67	+18	64	
9	Irchester United	40	18	7	15	86	68	+18	61	
10	Buckingham	40	18	6	16	68	70	−2	60	
11	Cranfield United	40	17	7	16	81	59	+22	58	
12	Langford	40	15	9	16	56	70	−14	54	
13	Long Buckby (R)	40	16	5	19	59	69	−10	53	Resigned to the Northamptonshire Combination League Premier Division
14	Rushden & Higham United	40	16	3	21	63	84	−21	51	
15	Leighton Town reserves	40	13	8	19	47	61	−14	47	
16	Letchworth Garden City Eagles	40	12	7	21	61	87	−26	43	
17	Royston Town reserves	40	12	4	24	54	78	−24	40	
18	Rothwell Corinthians	40	10	2	28	52	115	−63	32	
19	Huntingdon Town	40	8	7	25	50	115	−65	31	Reprived from relegation
20	London Colney (R)	40	7	3	30	57	105	−48	24	Relegated to Division Two
21	Shefford Town & Campton (R)	40	3	8	29	31	109	−78	17	Relegated to the Bedfordshire County League Premier Division

Source: The FA Full-Time
Rules for classification: 1) points; 2) goal difference; 3) number of goals scored; 4) number of matches won; 5) head-to-head results
(C) Champions; (O) Play-off winners; (P) Promoted; (R) Relegated

Reserve and U23 sides are ineligible for promotion to Step 5 or higher.

=== Play-offs ===
Semi-finals
2	Desborough Town	1
6	Belstone	0
3	Eaton Socon	2 (7)
4	Ampthill Town	2 (6)

Final
2	Desborough Town	4
3	Eaton Socon	3

==== Semifinals ====
28 April 2026	Desborough Town	1–0	Belstone	Desborough
19:45		Report		Stadium: Waterworks Field; Attendance: 221; Referee: Harry Demo

28 April 2026	Eaton Socon	2–2 (a.e.t.) (7–6 p)	Ampthill Town	St. Neots
19:45		Report		Stadium: River Road; Referee: Thomas Fogden

==== Final ====
2 May 2026	Desborough Town	4–3 (a.e.t.)	Eaton Socon	Desborough
15:00 GMT	Bradshaw 11'; Agbenu 13'; Honour 98'; Jammeh 117'	Report	George 79' (pen.); Fox 87'; Turner 103'	Stadium: Waterworks Field; Attendance: 415; Referee: Carl Jones

=== Results table ===
Home \ Away	AMP	BEL	BUC	CRA	DES	EAT	EVR	HUN	IRC	LAN	LEI	LGC	LOC	LGB	NBP	ROT	ROY	R&H	STC	STO	WEL
Ampthill Town	—	6–1	0–0	0–1	4–0	4–1	1–1	2–3	2–2	1–0	2–0	3–0	1–0	4–1	3–3	5–0	0–1	2–1	2–0	2–0	1–0
Belstone	5–2	—	3–1	1–3	2–1	1–3	3–0	3–2	3–0	4–3	2–0	3–1	6–0	4–0	5–0	4–0	1–0	3–2	4–0	2–2	2–4
Buckingham	1–2	1–0	—	2–1	1–1	1–2	1–4	5–2	2–2	1–2	3–0	0–1	2–1	1–0	2–2	4–0	2–2	1–2	3–2	1–0	2–0
Cranfield United	2–4	2–2	1–2	—	1–0	1–2	0–2	4–0	2–2	4–1	2–1	6–0	1–1	0–2	7–2	6–0	1–2	2–2	1–0	0–4	2–2
Desborough Town	0–1	6–0	3–0	2–0	—	2–0	2–1	9–0	3–0	3–1	3–2	4–1	3–1	6–1	2–1	3–1	1–2	4–1	8–3	4–1	1–1
Eaton Socon	2–0	2–1	4–0	2–1	1–2	—	2–5	2–1	3–0	5–2	1–0	1–0	3–1	5–0	2–1	6–1	2–0	4–0	1–0	2–0	0–1
Everett Rovers	4–0	2–3	5–3	3–1	2–2	3–1	—	7–0	3–0	3–0	2–0	3–0	5–2	6–0	5–1	6–1	5–4	4–1	3–3	1–1	3–5
Huntingdon Town	1–5	0–1	2–2	2–4	1–3	1–5	0–5	—	1–5	0–0	0–2	1–5	3–2	0–4	2–3	2–2	2–1	1–5	1–3	1–2	2–1
Irchester United	1–2	1–1	2–3	2–1	0–1	3–1	3–4	0–0	—	2–2	4–1	6–1	6–0	1–4	1–2	6–1	2–1	3–2	5–0	3–1	0–1
Langford	1–0	2–1	0–2	0–5	0–5	1–2	3–2	1–2	1–2	—	2–2	1–2	1–0	2–1	2–2	2–1	1–0	3–4	3–0	0–1	2–1
Leighton Town reserves	0–0	2–1	0–1	1–1	1–3	1–1	0–3	4–0	0–1	1–1	—	2–0	3–1	1–1	2–3	2–1	1–4	3–1	1–0	3–1	0–4
Letchworth Garden City Eagles	2–1	0–0	4–1	1–2	0–3	0–1	0–4	2–1	2–2	1–2	0–2	—	1–1	1–2	1–2	3–2	2–3	2–3	4–0	1–1	2–2
London Colney	1–3	2–1	1–2	0–1	1–5	A/W	1–3	4–2	6–3	1–4	0–1	1–2	—	1–2	1–3	4–1	2–1	3–0	3–4	1–4	1–2
Long Buckby	0–1	2–1	3–0	1–0	1–1	3–1	1–2	1–2	0–3	3–3	3–1	0–1	4–0	—	1–2	0–1	3–2	0–1	3–1	0–3	2–2
New Bradwell St Peter	1–3	2–1	4–2	2–0	0–1	1–0	3–3	1–1	2–4	0–0	1–2	3–1	2–1	2–1	—	2–1	3–1	2–2	4–2	1–1	2–2
Rothwell Corinthians	0–3	0–1	0–5	0–5	0–1	2–4	1–4	2–3	0–2	2–3	2–1	1–4	3–2	2–1	0–4	—	2–1	2–0	2–0	0–1	3–2
Royston Town reserves	1–4	0–1	2–1	2–0	0–4	0–3	0–6	0–0	2–5	0–1	1–1	3–4	3–4	0–3	0–1	1–4	—	4–1	2–0	0–1	1–1
Rushden & Higham United	1–2	3–2	2–3	0–4	1–0	0–2	0–3	1–1	2–0	2–0	2–1	2–0	3–2	2–0	4–3	1–4	1–3	—	2–1	0–3	1–3
Shefford Town & Campton	0–5	0–5	0–2	1–1	0–3	1–5	0–4	0–5	0–2	1–1	0–0	2–2	2–2	0–0	1–3	1–1	0–2	1–4	—	2–1	0–3
Stotfold reserves	2–1	1–3	2–0	1–5	6–1	1–2	0–1	3–2	2–0	0–0	3–0	6–3	7–1	1–2	3–1	5–2	2–1	1–0	2–0	—	2–1
Wellingborough Whitworth	0–2	1–0	6–2	5–0	1–5	3–2	0–4	4–0	3–0	1–2	0–2	4–4	2–1	2–3	3–1	5–4	0–1	2–1	4–0	1–4	—

Source: FA Full-Time Grid
Legend: Blue = home team win; Yellow = draw; Red = away team win.
For upcoming matches, an "a" indicates there is an article about the rivalry between the two participants.

=== Stadia and locations ===
Locations of Division One clubs
Locations of Division One clubs (Bedfordshire)

Team	Location	Stadium	Capacity
Ampthill Town	Ampthill	Ampthill Park	1,300
Belstone	Radlett	Medburn Ground	1,000
Buckingham	Buckingham	Stratford Fields	
Cranfield United	Cranfield	Crawley Road	
Desborough Town	Desborough	Waterworks Field	1,000
Eaton Socon	Eaton Ford	River Road	
Everett Rovers	Watford	Leggatts Green	
Huntingdon Town	Huntingdon	Jubilee Park	
Irchester United	Irchester	Alfred Street	1,800
Langford	Henlow	Forde Park	2,800
Leighton Town reserves	Leighton Buzzard	Bell Close	2,800
Letchworth Garden City Eagles	Letchworth Garden City	Pixmore Pitches	
London Colney	London Colney	Cotlandswick Park	1,000
Long Buckby	Long Buckby	Station Road	1,000
New Bradwell St Peter	Milton Keynes (Bradville)	The Recreation Ground	1,000
Rothwell Corinthians	Rothwell	Desborough Road	
Royston Town reserves	Royston	Garden Walk	5,000
Rushden & Higham United	Rushden	Hayden Road	1,500
Shefford Town & Campton	Shefford	Shefford Sports Club	1,000
Stotfold reserves	Stotfold	The JSJ Stadium	1,500
Wellingborough Whitworth	Wellingborough	The Victoria Mill Ground	2,140

== Division Two ==
Spartan South Midlands Football League Division Two
- Season: 2025–26
- Matches: 268
- Goals: 1,040 (3.88 per match)
- Biggest home win: Milton Keynes College 7–0 Padbury Village (9 September 2025)
- Biggest away win: Milton Keynes Irish reserves 0–6 Tring Corinthians (30 August 2025); Sarratt 1–7 Old Bradwell United (15 November 2025)
- Highest scoring: Harpenden Town development 4–6 Milton Keynes Irish reserves (30 September 2025); Harpenden Town development 8–2 Padbury Village (1 November 2025)
- All statistics correct as of 9 March 2026.

This division comprises 17 teams, the same amount as the previous season.

1 club left the division:

- New Bradwell St Peter - promoted to Division One.

1 club joined the division:

- Harpenden Town Development - promoted from Hertfordshire Senior County League Division One.

=== League table ===
Pos	Team	Pld	W	D	L	GF	GA	GD	Pts	Promotion, qualification or relegation
1	Pitstone & Ivinghoe United (C)	32	20	5	7	69	48	+21	65	
2	Sarratt	32	20	5	7	75	55	+20	65	
3	Milton Keynes College	32	17	6	9	75	45	+30	57	
4	Totternhoe	32	17	5	10	72	48	+24	56	
5	Bovingdon (P)	32	17	5	10	72	55	+17	56	Promoted to the Combined Counties Football League
6	Milton Keynes Irish Reserves	32	16	6	10	81	68	+13	56 (Note: During the game between Newport Pagnell Town Development and Milton Keynes Irish Reserves on 10 March 2026, Newport Pagnell Town Development fielded an ineligible player. The game was awarded to Milton Keynes Irish Reserves, receiving two points, and Newport Pagnell Town Development were deducted 1 point.)	
7	Tring Corinthians	32	16	7	9	54	38	+16	55	
8	Old Bradwell United	32	15	4	13	60	47	+13	49	
9	Aston Clinton	32	14	5	13	58	55	+3	47	
10	Harpenden Town Development	32	13	6	13	79	69	+10	45	
11	Caddington	32	12	7	13	56	50	+6	43	
12	Eynesbury United	32	12	4	16	64	65	−1	40	
13	The 61 (Luton)	32	11	6	15	50	69	−19	39	
14	Newport Pagnell Town Development	32	8	9	15	53	73	−20	32	
15	Stony Stratford Town	32	7	5	20	51	77	−26	26	
16	Padbury Village	32	5	8	19	38	88	−50	23	
17	Codicote	32	5	1	26	40	97	−57	16	

Source: The FA Full-Time
Rules for classification: 1) points; 2) goal difference; 3) number of goals scored; 4) number of matches won; 5) head-to-head results
(C) Champions; (P) Promoted

=== Stadia and locations ===
Locations of Division Two clubs
Locations of Division Two clubs (Buckinghamshire)

Team	Location	Stadium	Capacity
Aston Clinton	Aston Clinton	London Road	1,000
Bovingdon	Bovingdon	Green Lane	1,000
Caddington	Caddington	Caddington Recreation Club	1,000
Codicote	Codicote	John Clements Memorial Ground	1,000
Eynesbury United	Eynesbury	The Alfred Hall Memorial Ground (Groundshare with Eynesbury Rovers)	1,000
Harpenden Town Development	Harpenden	Rothamsted Park	1,000
Milton Keynes College	Milton Keynes	Sport Central MK	
Milton Keynes Irish Reserves	Milton Keynes (Fenny Stratford)	Manor Fields	1,000
Newport Pagnell Town Development	Newport Pagnell	Willen Road	500
Old Bradwell United	Milton Keynes (Bradwell)	Abbey Road	500
Padbury Village	Padbury	Springfields Playing Field	
Pitstone & Ivinghoe United	Pitstone	Pitstone Pavilion & Sports Hall	1,500
Sarratt	Sarratt	King Georges Field	1,000
Stony Stratford Town	Stony Stratford	Ostlers Lane	1,000
The 61 (Luton)	Luton	Kingsway Ground	1,500
Totternhoe	Totternhoe	Totternhoe Recreation Ground	500
Tring Corinthians	Tring	Icknield Way	500
