= Hertfordshire County Football Association =

Governing body of association football in Hertfordshire

- Formation: 1885
- Purpose: Football association
- Headquarters: County Ground; Baldock Road
- Location(s): Letchworth Garden City; Hertfordshire SG6 2EN
- Chief Executive: Karl Lingham
- Website: hertfordshirefa.com

The Hertfordshire County Football Association, also simply known as Hertfordshire FA, is the governing body of football in the county of Hertfordshire, England. The Hertfordshire FA was founded accidentally in 1885 after the existing teams (then numbering around 20) agreed to hold a meeting to discuss their position, and ended up affiliating.

== History ==
In the early 1880s there were already 20 clubs operating in Hertfordshire and with interest continuing to grow, the Secretary of St Albans FC, Mr R. Cook called a meeting in 1885 which was to have been held at The Football Association's Headquarters, then at 51 High Holborn in Central London but on arrival they found the offices closed. An alternative venue was found for the meeting at the nearby The Farringdon Pub in Holborn.

In its first season 20 clubs affiliated and numbers substantially increased year on year. Today the number stands close to 2,500 teams.

Key dates in the development of Hertfordshire County FA are detailed below:

1885 – Association formed with 20 member clubs

1894 – Under the guidance of Mr.H.W. English, a master at Hitchin Grammar School and Secretary of the Association from 1894–98 a scheme to control the Association's affairs by a council was introduced. The initial scheme, albeit developed and improved still forms the basis on which the administration of the Hertfordshire FA is conducted today.

1901 – Huge difficulties facing the association until a man of the moment, George Wagstaffe Simmons stepped in. During Wagstaffe Simmons 18 years as Secretary the Association's fortunes were transformed. When he took over there were less than 40 clubs with funds available under £20. When he handed over to his successor the membership had grown, over 200 clubs affiliated and had assets of £500-£66- an enormous sum on money in those days, coming at the end of The Great War.

1924 – Wagstaffe Simmons appointed Chairman of the Hertfordshire FA Council and also represented the Hertfordshire FA on the Council of The Football Association, positions he held until 1951. During his time with The FA he became Chairman of the International Selection Committee and established reputation, not only as an eloquent speaker on all subjects relating to the game, but as authority on its laws and admissions.

1935 – County Association reaches its Golden Anniversary with a Jubilee Banquet and Concert held at the Holborn Restaurant. During the evening Mr. Wagstaffe Simmons was able to say 'I do not suggest that the Hertfordshire FA Council is perfect, but it's not far off'. Proposing the toast to the Hertfordshire FA was Sir Stanley Rous, Secretary of The Football Association, who ten years prior to his appointment to football's top job was a member of the Hertfordshire FA Council.

1951–61 – During this period Hertfordshire's population increased by 34% which caused huge problems in relation to playing fields and recreational facilities. The association applied to The FA for financial aid, without which the necessary work could not be undertaken.

1960 – The association celebrated its 75th anniversary and at the Dinner Sir Stanley Rous, now a knight of the Realm, proposed the toast to Hertfordshire FA. In 1985 Sir Stanley completed an amazing treble when he was guest of honour at the association's centenary celebrations held at Watford Town Hall.

1961 – Sunday Football was brought under the control of the Hertfordshire FA and its rapid expansion introduced many new players to the game by hundreds.

1998 – Hertfordshire County Youth F.A. becomes part of the Hertfordshire FA.

1999 – Hertfordshire FA becomes a Limited Company, one of the first counties in England to take this step. Managing director Ron Kibble announces that the association's nomadic existence was finally over when we bought the Lease of Letchworth Football Club Ground through the hard work of Mr Kibble, Eric Hand and Cecil Hudson. New County FA Headquarters were opened in Letchworth.

Hertfordshire have many people who served their county year after year, some being Ernest Scott, W.R. Watson, George Wagstaffe Simmons, Percy Poulter and Arthur Aldridge.

== Organisation ==
Hertfordshire County FA has a team of staff that look to safeguard and develop football within the county. Based at The County Ground in Letchworth, both the Governance and Development teams work together in improving the football experience for all within Hertfordshire.

- The Governance Team – deals with Discipline, Competitions, Referees, Affiliations and all general enquiries regarding the administration side of grassroots football across the County.
- The Development Team – deals with Charter Standard, Coach Education, Women & Girls, Disability, Small Sided football, Facilities, Funding and working with key partners to develop more opportunities to Get Involved in the game.

== Affiliated leagues ==
=== Youth leagues ===
- Hertfordshire Girls Football Partnership League
- Herts Youth Inclusive League
- Herts Youth League
- Mid Herts League (1968)
- Royston Crow Youth Football League (1971)
- Southern Counties Floodlit Youth League
- Watford Friendly League (1970)
- West Herts Youth League

=== Adult Saturday leagues ===
- Herts Senior County League
- West Herts Saturday League

=== Adult Sunday leagues ===
- Berkhamsted Sunday Football League
- East Herts Corinthian League (1993)
- Hertfordshire 1961 Sunday Football League
- Herts Vets Super League
- Hitchin Sunday League (1977)
- North West Essex Sunday League
- Watford Sunday Football League

=== Small-sided leagues ===
- Herts Women's Walking Football League
- Ultimate Football League

=== Wheelchair Football ===
- South East Powerchair Football League

== Affiliated member clubs ==
Current senior clubs that are affiliated to the Hertfordshire County FA are:

- AFC Welwyn
- Baldock Town
- Barnet
- Berkhamsted
- Bishop's Stortford
- Boreham Wood
- Bovingdon
- Cheshunt
- Codicote
- Colney Heath
- Enfield
- Everett Rovers
- Hadley
- Harpenden Town
- Hemel Hempstead Town
- Hertford Town
- Hitchin Town
- Hoddesdon Town
- Kings Langley
- Letchworth Garden City Eagles
- Leverstock Green
- London Colney
- London Lions
- Oxhey Jets
- Potters Bar Town
- Royston Town
- Sarratt
- Sawbridgeworth Town
- St Albans City
- St Margaretsbury
- Stevenage
- Tring Athletic
- Tring Corinthians
- Ware
- Watford
- Welwyn Garden City
- Wormley Rovers

== Leading Women's Clubs ==
- AFC Welwyn Ladies
- Arsenal Ladies
- Colney Heath Ladies
- Harpenden Town Women
- Hertford Town Women
- Hitchin Belles Women
- Royston Town Women
- St Albans City Women
- Stevenage Women
- Watford Ladies
- Wormley Rovers Ladies

== County Cup Competitions ==
The Hertfordshire County FA run the following cup competitions:

- Hertfordshire Senior Challenge Cup
- Hertfordshire Senior Centenary Trophy
- Hertfordshire Charity Cup
- Hertfordshire Charity Shield
- Hertfordshire Intermediate Cup
- Hertfordshire Junior Cup
- Hertfordshire Sunday Senior Cup
- Hertfordshire Sunday Intermediate Cup
- Hertfordshire Sunday Junior Cup
- Hertfordshire Veterans' Cup
- Hertfordshire Women's Cup
- Hertfordshire Boys U9 Challenge Cup
- Hertfordshire Boys U10 Challenge Cup
- Hertfordshire Boys U11 Challenge Cup
- Hertfordshire Boys U12 Challenge Cup
- Hertfordshire Boys U13 Challenge Cup
- Hertfordshire Boys U14 Challenge Cup
- Hertfordshire Boys U15 Challenge Cup
- Hertfordshire Boys U16 Challenge Cup
- Hertfordshire Boys U18 Challenge Cup
- Hertfordshire 7 v. 7 Girls U10
- Hertfordshire 9 v. 9 Girls U14
- Hertfordshire U10 Girls 7 v. 7 Challenge Cup
- Hertfordshire U11 Girls 7 v. 7
- Hertfordshire U12 Girls Challenge Cup
- Hertfordshire Girls U12 Challenge Cup
- Hertfordshire Girls U13 Challenge Cup
- Hertfordshire Girls U14 '9 v. 9' Challenge Cup
- Hertfordshire Girls U14 Challenge Cup
- Hertfordshire Girls U15 Challenge Cup
- Hertfordshire Girls U16 Challenge Cup

== List of recent Hertfordshire County Cup winners ==
Season	Senior Cup	Senior Trophy	Charity Cup	Charity Shield	Junior Cup	Women's Cup
2021-22	Cheshunt	Chipperfield Corinthians	Not held	Not held	Hertford Heath Reserves	Stevenage Women
2022-23	Berkhamsted	Ware Sports	Not held	Not held	Sun Sports Rovers	Stevenage Women
2023-24	St Albans City	Hoddesdon Town	St Albans City	Tring Athletic	Sarratt Reserves	Royston Town Women
2024-25	Hemel Hempstead Town	Everett Rovers	Hadley	Tring Athletic	Chorleywood Common	Royston Town Women
2025-26	Hitchin Town	Chipperfield Corinthians	Royston Town	Baldock Town	Hemel Hempstead Rovers	Stevenage Women
2026-27			Not held	Not held		

Since 2023 there has been a Hertfordshire Women's Trophy and the three winners have been:

2023/24 - Stevenage Women Development

2024/25 - Watford FC Women Development

2025/26 - Ware United Ladies
