= Kings Langley F.C. =

Association football club in England

Coordinates: 51°43′22″N 0°27′03″W

Kings Langley
- Full name: Kings Langley Football Club
- Nicknames: Lango, Kings
- Founded: 1886; 140 years ago
- Ground: Gaywood Park, Kings Langley
- Capacity: 2,100 (274 seated)
- Manager: Steve Heath
- League: Spartan South Midlands League Premier Division
- 2025–26: Spartan South Midlands League Premier Division, 5th of 20
- Website: https://www.kingslangleyfc.co.uk
Home colours	Away colours

Kings Langley Football Club are a semi-professional association football club in the village and civil parish of Kings Langley, Hertfordshire, England. The club have spent the majority of their history in the Hertfordshire County League, they joined the Spartan South Midlands Football League in 2001, winning the Premier Division in the 2015–16 season and are currently members of the Spartan South Midlands League Premier Division.

== History ==
Kings Langley Football Club was founded in 1886, with the village doctor, Frederick Fisher, as its first chairman. Founder members of the West Herts League in the 1891–92 season, Kings Langley also won the St. Mary's Cup in front of 3,500 people at the Watford Recreation Ground that season, retaining it the next year and losing the final on a replay the year after that. Early grounds included Groomes Meadow, Blackwell Meadow, and Kings Langley Common, and although it has been stated that the club did not settle at Home Park until 1913, the ground is known to have hosted an 1898–99 match against Hemel Hempstead Town in front of 300 spectators.

After slipping down the divisions, Kings Langley's first league honour came in 1911–12, winning the West Herts Division 3 Championship, followed by the Division 2 Championship in 1919–20. The following two seasons saw an uncomfortable time in the Herts County League, before returning to the West Herts Division 1 in 1922–23. A similar drop down the divisions led to the club folding in February 1930, only to be reformed four months later, with a Division 2 Championship and Webster Cup triumph at the end of the first season. The return to the top flight lasted only two seasons, but two years later Kings Langley topped Division 2 for their fourth divisional title.

1934 saw a new pavilion built on Home Park, opened by future FIFA president Sir Stanley Rous. With the Herts County League undergoing reformation, Langley took the radical step of joining the Southern Olympian League, taking the second and first division titles in successive years and spending two seasons in the Premier until the outbreak of the Second World War.

A 1939 application to play in the FA Cup was accepted prior to the 1945–46 edition, leaving Kings Langley just four weeks to put a team together. The club succeeded, making it to the first qualifying round before getting knocked out. When league football resumed the following year, Kings found themselves back in the Herts County League, gaining promotion from Division Two that year. In the five seasons that followed, Kings Langley won the First Division title twice, came runners-up twice, and won the St. Mary's Cup after a 58-year gap.

Kings Langley regularly competed in the FA Amateur Cup, and in September 1949 they entertained the famous amateurs of Corinthian Casuals, a match that generated significant local interest. A crowd of over 500 watched as Corinthians ran out 3–1 winners.

Three successful seasons in the Parthenon League followed, but travelling expenses were high, so in 1955–56 the club returned to the Herts County League and would remain there for the next 45 years. Gradual improvement led to back-to-back Premier League titles in 1965–66 and 1966–67, plus a Herts Charity Shield triumph in the latter year, and the Aubrey Cup in 1967–68. This was perhaps the "golden period" of the club's history, and although the club won the St. Mary's Cup again in 1971–72, relegation followed a year later. The club began yo-yoing between Division One and the Premier League, before another promotion was overshadowed by the loss of Home Park to redevelopment in 1980. A nomadic existence followed, the club playing at Oxhey, Rolls Royce & Buncefield Lane, and finally at the Leavesden Hospital's ground.

In March 1997, Kings Langley finally gained a new permanent home on Hempstead Road. The reformation of the club's youth team in 1989 helped play a part in this, as junior and senior supporters joined forces to help obtain the land, lay the pitches, and build a pavilion. Sponsors of the project included the National Lottery, the Hertfordshire FA, Dacorum Borough Council, Kings Langley Parish Council, and Graham Gaywood, a well-known benefactor of the club who died soon after the stadium's completion. The ground is named Gaywood Park in his honour.

However, the new home did not bring an immediate turnabout in results and despite winning the Rickmansworth Charity Cup, Langley were embroiled in relegation battles for the next two seasons. The club's form improved at the turn of the Millennium, finishing fourth in 1999–2000 before losing the title race on goal difference in 2000–01, and the decision was taken to apply for a higher level of football. The club was accepted to the Spartan South Midlands League at Division One level, and while the club held its own with three mid-table finishes, the club's finances were drained in order to upgrade the stadium to league standards, and the club were relegated in 2003–04.

Kings Langley's first season in the lower tier was disappointing, and Steve Heath was appointed manager for the next campaign. A sixth-place in 2005–06 was followed by a runners-up spot the next season, but ground standards were still an issue and promotion was denied. 2007–08 saw a magnificent treble success of League, Division 2 Cup, and the retention of the Herts Intermediate Cup; Kings Langley were unbeaten in all competitions from September 2007 until October 2008, an incredible run of 47 consecutive matches. In the meantime, the club continued to upgrade their facilities to the required standard, a task completed by the start of the 2009–10 season, by which time Heath had moved on. He was succeeded by the experienced Paul Hobbs, who took a new young side to an encouraging 7th-placed finish, as well as the semi-finals of the Herts FA Senior Centenary Cup and the quarter finals of both the Challenge Trophy and Division One Cup. 2010–11 saw his emerging side further improve to third, narrowly missing out on promotion as the club celebrated its 125th anniversary.

In 2011–12 the club finished fourth in Division 1 and won the Herts Senior Centenary Trophy for the first time, as well as finishing runners-up in both the Herts Charity Shield and the Division One Cup. Paul Hobbs stepped down at the end of the season, and Ritchie Hanlon and Paul Hughes were appointed joint managers. The club won the Division 1 Cup in each of the next two seasons, and in the latter season they also won promotion to the Premier Division for the first time, finishing runners-up behind Sun Postal Sports. The club were also granted FA Charter status during this time.

Kings Langley won the Premier Division at the first attempt in 2014–15, earning back-to-back promotions to the Southern Football League. They then went on to win the Southern League Division One Central the following season, pipping Egham Town and Royston Town to the title in the final game of the season. After three successive promotions, Kings Langley played in the Southern Premier Division for the first time in their history in 2016–17. In doing so, they became only the fourth club in England and the first since 2013 to achieve three or more promotions in successive seasons.

After rumoured impending budget cuts early into the club's first Southern Premier Division season, joint managers Hughes and Hanlon stepped down after four years in charge, later taking over at Hayes & Yeading. Former coach Paul Hobbs returned to the club on a caretaker basis then later decided to stay with the club until the end of the season. the 2016–17 was a gruelling battle against relegation in their debut season. A run of six games without defeat, coupled with a 2–0 win away at Hayes & Yeading and a dramatic 1–0 win at home against Cirencester Town on the final game ensured Kings' survival against the odds. Afterwards, Paul Hobbs decided to stay on as 1st team manager.

The 2017–18 close season saw a number of changes with long-term chairman Derry Edgar stepping down to become Football Secretary and Jeremy Wilkins becoming chairman. Also, a new under 18s team were founded, with youth coach Alan Beeton taking the helm as manager.

The 2017–2018 season started poorly for Kings Langley and Paul Hobbs was replaced as manager in December 2017 by Steve Conroy. Steve ensured that relegation was avoided, finishing 21st and then went on the following season to lead the club to its highest ever finish of 6th place in Southern League Premier Division South, narrowly missing out on a play-off position.

Chairman Jeremy Wilkins, although still active in the club, stepped down in the summer of 2019 and Danny Perman was appointed in his place.

In May 2019 Steve Conroy left the club to join Walton Casuals FC, stating that his ambitions were different from those of the club, and he was replaced by Dean Barker (previously Welwyn Garden City manager) in June 2019.

Also at this time, The Football Association decreed that Kings Langley should move within the football pyramid and for season 2019-20 they will be part of the Southern League Premier Division Central.

Dean Barker then left the club at the end of September, along with his coaching staff. Ryan Jackett, son of Portsmouth F.C. manager Kenny Jackett, took the helm for two fixtures as interim manager before Chris Cummins was appointed as manager.

The 2024/25 season saw Kings relegated to Step 5 and they would compete in the Spartan South Midlands Football League Premier Division in 2025/26.

Returning manager Steve Heath went about building a squad with lots of non-league experience and familiar faces like Louie Collier, Matt Bateman, Kieran Turner, Kyle and Gary Connolly all returned to the club.

== Crest and colours ==
The club's crest consists of a white rose in a black circle with "Kings Langley FC" written in the circle on the outside. a crown also features on the top of the crest.

The club have used variations of this crest since the club's founding in 1886.

Kings Langley's colours consist of a predominantly white strip with black-trimmed shirts, black shorts and black hose. Historically, the club have worn black and white striped jerseys with black or white shorts and hose although they have also used yellow, blue, amber and black and red as home colours but these are now often used as away colours.

== Management and coaching staff ==
=== Current staff ===
Position	Name
Chairman	(England) Darren Elliot
Director/Secretary	(England) Derry Edgar
Director	(England) Roy Mitchard
Manager	(England) Steve Heath
Assistant Manager	(England) Joe Sweeney
First Team Coach	(England) Ian Felgate
Sports Therapist	(England) Craig Hoile

== Honours ==
League

- Southern Football League
  - Division One Central – champions: 2015–16
- Spartan South Midlands Football League
  - Premier Division – champions: 2014–15
  - Division One – runners-up: 2013–14
  - Division Two – champions: 2007–08
- Hertfordshire County League
  - Premier Division – champions: 1949–50, 1951–52, 1965–66, 1966–67
  - Division One – champions: 1975–76
- West Hertfordshire League
  - Division Two – champions: 1919–20, 1930–31, 1934–35
  - Division Three – champions: 1911–12
- Southern Olympian League
  - Division One – champions: 1936–37

Cup

- Spartan South Midlands Football League
  - Division One Cup – winners: 2012–13, 2013–14
- Hertfordshire Football Association
  - Intermediate Cup – winners: 2006–07, 2007–08
  - Charity Shield – winners: 1966–67
  - Senior Centenary Trophy – winners: 2011–12
  - St Mary's Cup – winners: 1891–92, 1892–93, 1950–51, 1971–72 – runners-up: 2016–17

Other titles and awards

- Apsley Senior Cup – winners: 1952–53, 1960–61, 1976–77
- Aubrey Cup – winners: 1967–68
- Chiltern Villages Cup – winners: 1986–87, 1988–89
- Rickmansworth Charity Cup – winners: 1997–98
- Watford Hospital Charity Shield – winners: 1934–35
- Webster Cup – winners: 1930–31
- Sir Stanley Rous Memorial Trophy – winners: 2015–16

== Records ==
- Best FA Cup performance
  - Fourth Qualifying Round - 2019–20
- Best FA Trophy performance
  - Third Qualifying Round – 2016–17
- Best FA Vase performance
  - Third Round – 2026–27

== See also ==
- Kings Langley F.C. players
- Kings Langley F.C. managers
