= Herts Charity Cup =

- Founded: 1901
- Region: Hertfordshire; England
- Teams: 8
- Current champions: St Albans City
- Most championships: St Albans City (27 titles)
- Website: hertfordshirefa.com/cup

The Herts Charity Cup, officially titled the Hertfordshire Football Association Charity Cup, was begun in the 1900–01 season as a fund raising competition for the chosen charities of the Hertfordshire County Football Association. It is second only in status to the Herts Senior Cup within the competitions run by the Herts FA and is the third longest running, following the Herts Senior Cup (1886–87) and the Herts Junior Cup (1894–95). The charity aspect of the competition is still maintained with the Herts FA donating £525 from the 2008–09 competition to various chosen football-connected charities such as the St Johns Ambulance Brigade and Disability Sport England.

It is currently contested by the eight senior clubs in the county, outside the Football League (for this reason, Watford, Stevenage and Boreham Wood do not enter). The eight clubs who entered in the 2008–09 season were Bishop's Stortford and St Albans City (Football Conference), Ware, Cheshunt, Potters Bar Town and Hitchin Town (Isthmian League), Hemel Hempstead Town (Southern League) and the now defunct Berkhamsted Town (Spartan South Midlands League).

Potters Bar Town also play in the Middlesex Senior Cup, because Potters Bar was historically in Middlesex, and the club is affiliated to both the Hertfordshire and the Middlesex County Football Association.

== Results ==
Season	Winner	Score	Runner-up
1900–01	Cheshunt	w–o (Note: St Albans refused to accept a date for final. Cheshunt were awarded the cup.)	St Albans Amateurs
1901–02	Hitchin	4–2	St Albans Amateurs
1902–03	Hitchin	6–2	Cheshunt
1903–04	Cheshunt	w–o	St Albans Amateurs
1904–05	Hitchin	2–1	Cheshunt
1905–06	Cheshunt	5–0	St Albans Abbey
1906–07	St Albans Abbey	2–0	Watford Victoria Works
1907–08	Barnet & Alston	2–0	Harpenden
1908–09	Waltham Glendale	4–2*	Harpenden
1909–10	St Albans City	2–0	Barnet & Alston
1910–11	Waltham Glendale	3–1	Hoddesdon
1911–12	Barnet & Alston	2–1	St Albans City
1912–13	St Albans City	8–1	Hertford Town
1913–14	Barnet & Alston	5–0	St Albans City
1914–15		Not played	
1915–16		Not played	
1916–17		Not played	
1917–18		Not played	
1918–19		Not played	
1919–20	Barnet	2–0	Leavesden Mental Hospital
1920–21	St Albans City	3–1	Barnet
1921–22	St Albans City	5–1	Hertford Town
1922–23	St Albans City	4–0	Ware
1923–24	St Albans City	3–0	Barnet
1924–25	St Albans City	5–1	Hitchin Blue Cross
1925–26	St Albans City	3–0	Barnet
1926–27	Barnet	4–1*	St Albans City
1927–28	Barnet	3–1	St Albans City
1928–29	St Albans City	3–2	Barnet
1929–30	Barnet	4–1	Berkhamsted Town
1930–31	Barnet	3–1	Hertford Town
1931–32	Barnet	3–1	St Albans City
1932–33	Barnet	2–1	St Albans City
1933–34	Barnet	4–0	Hitchin Town
1934–35	Barnet	3–2	St Albans City
1935–36	Barnet	3–2	Hitchin Town
1936–37	Barnet	5–4*	Hitchin Town
1937–38	Barnet	4–3*	St Albans City
1938–39	St Albans City	1–0	Hitchin Town
1939–40	Hitchin Town	6–2	Barnet
1940–41	Hitchin Town	1–1* (Note: Competition shared.)	St Albans City
1941–42	St Albans City	5–0	Hitchin Town
1942–43	Barnet	2–1	Hitchin Town
1943–44	Hitchin Town	3–0	Barnet
1944–45	Barnet	2–1	Hitchin Town
1945–46	Barnet	4–0	St Albans City
1946–47	Barnet	2–1	Hitchin Town
1947–48	Barnet	3–1	Hitchin Town
1948–49	Barnet	2–1	St Albans City
1949–50	Barnet	4–1	St Albans City
1950–51	St Albans City	2–0	Barnet
1951–52	Barnet	4–3	St Albans City
1952–53	St Albans City	4–2	Barnet
1953–54	St Albans City	2–0	Barnet
1954–55	Hitchin Town	2–1	St Albans City
1955–56	St Albans City	2–1	Bishop's Stortford
1956–57	St Albans City	2–0	Bishop's Stortford
1957–58	St Albans City	2–1	Hitchin Town
1958–59	Hitchin Town	3–0	Barnet
1959–60	Barnet	2–0	Bishop's Stortford
1960–61	Hitchin Town	4–3	Hertford Town
1961–62	Barnet	3–2	Hitchin Town
1962–63	Bishop's Stortford	3–1	St Albans City
1963–64	Barnet	3–1	Bishop's Stortford
1964–65	Barnet	3–2	Ware
1965–66	Bishop's Stortford	4–2	Ware
1966–67	St Albans City	1–0	Hemel Hempstead Town
1967–68	Hitchin Town	2–0	Hertford Town
1968–69	St Albans City	2–0	Bishop's Stortford
1969–70	St Albans City	3–1	Hitchin Town
1970–71	St Albans City	1–0	Cheshunt
1971–72	St Albans City	2–1	Boreham Wood
1972–73	Hertford Town	1–0	Hitchin Town
1973–74	Bishop's Stortford	2–1	Hertford Town
1974–75	Letchworth Town	4–1	Cheshunt
1975–76	Hitchin Town	4–0	Hemel Hempstead Town
1976–77	Hitchin Town	2–1*	St Albans City
1977–78	Hitchin Town	3–1	Letchworth Town
1978–79	Hitchin Town	3–1	Ware
1979–80	Hitchin Town	1–0	Hertford Town
1980–81	Boreham Wood	2–1	Cheshunt
1981–82	Bishop's Stortford	4–0	St Albans City
1982–83	Bishop's Stortford	3–1	Hitchin Town
1983–84	Boreham Wood	3–2	Hitchin Town
1984–85	Bishop's Stortford	4–1	Boreham Wood
1985–86	Boreham Wood	1–1 (4–3^)	Hitchin Town
1986–87	St Albans City	2–1	Boreham Wood
1987–88	Bishop's Stortford	3–0	St Albans City
1988–89	Boreham Wood	1–0	St Albans City
1989–90	Boreham Wood	1–0	Ware
1990–91	Hitchin Town	1–0	Ware
1991–92	Baldock Town	2–1	Boreham Wood
1992–93	St Albans City	1–0	Boreham Wood
1993–94	Baldock Town	2–1	Stevenage Borough
1994–95	St Albans City	2–1	Boreham Wood
1995–96	Stevenage Borough	4–2	St Albans City
1996–97	Bishop's Stortford	4–0	Ware
1997–98	St Albans City	6–0	Berkhamsted Town
1998–99		Not played	
1999–2000	Hitchin Town	4–1	Baldock Town
2000–01	Hitchin Town	3–0	Tring Town
2001–02	Berkhamsted Town	7–4	Hitchin Town
2002–03	Bishop's Stortford	3–1	Hemel Hempstead Town
2003–04	Bishop's Stortford	4–1	Cheshunt
2004–05	Hemel Hempstead Town	2–0	Bishop's Stortford
2005–06	Cheshunt	1–0	Boreham Wood
2006–07	Potters Bar Town	3–0	Hemel Hempstead Town
2007–08	Cheshunt	1–0	Ware
2008–09	Hemel Hempstead Town	2–1	Ware
2009–10	Hemel Hempstead Town	2–1	Broxbourne Borough V&E
2010–11	Bishop's Stortford	2–2 (3–2^)	Cheshunt
2011–12	Bishop's Stortford	2–1	Leverstock Green
2012–13	St Albans City	3–2	Bishop's Stortford
2013–14	Bishop's Stortford	2–2 (4–3^)	Hitchin Town
2014–15	Bishop's Stortford	1–0	Royston Town
2015–16	Bishop's Stortford	1–0	St Albans City
2016–17	Cheshunt	1–0	Hitchin Town
2017–18	Hitchin Town	w–o (Note: Hemel withdrew from the competition because of player safety concerns, Hitchin were awarded the cup.)	Hemel Hempstead Town
2018–19	Hitchin Town	2–0	Hemel Hempstead Town
2019–20	Berkhamsted	Not played and awarded jointly due to Covid-19	Hemel Hempstead Town
2020–21		Not played	
2021–22		Not played	
2022–23		Not played	
2023–24	St Albans City	2-1	Potters Bar Town
2024-25	Hadley	4-2	Welwyn Garden City
2025-26	Royston Town	3-3 (4-2^)	Berkhamsted

- * After extra time
- ^ Penalties

== Results by team ==
Club	Wins	Last final won	Runners–up	Last final lost
St. Albans City	27	2023–24	21	1995–96
Barnet	24	1964–65	10	1953–54
Hitchin Town	17	2018–19	19	1969–70
Bishop's Stortford	15	2015–16	6	2012–13
Cheshunt	6	2016-17	7	2010–11
Boreham Wood	5	1989–90	7	1994–95
Hemel Hempstead Town	3	2009–10	4	1966–67
Barnet & Alston	3	1913–14	1	1909–10
Hitchin	3	1904–05	0	N/A
Baldock Town	2	1993–94	1	1999–2000
Waltham Glendale	2	1910–11	0	N/A
Hertford Town	1	1972–73	7	1979–80
Berkhamsted Town	1	2001–02	2	1997–98
Letchworth Garden City (Note: Includes results under their previous names of Letchworth Town and Letchworth Athletic)	1	1974–75	1	1977–78
St Albans Abbey	1	1906–07	1	1905–06
Stevenage Borough	1	1995–96	1	1993–94
Potters Bar Town	1	2006–07	1	2023–24
Ware	0	N/A	9	1922–23
St. Albans Amateurs	0	N/A	3	1903–04
Harpenden	0	N/A	2	1908–09
Broxbourne Borough V&E	0	N/A	1	2009–10
Hitchin Blue Cross	0	N/A	1	1924–25
Hoddesdon Town (Note: Includes results under the name of Hoddesdon)	0	N/A	1	1910–11
Leavesden Mental Hospital	0	N/A	1	1919–20
Leverstock Green	0	N/A	1	2011–12
Royston Town	1	2025-26	1	2014-15
Tring Town	0	N/A	1	2000–01
Watford Victoria Works	0	N/A	1	1906–07
Hadley	1	2024-25	0	N/A
Welwyn Garden City	0	N/A	1	2024-25
Berkhamsted	0	N/A	1	2025-26
