= John Clements (GC) =

Recipient of the George Cross

John Clements GC was a schoolmaster at Sherrardswood School, Welwyn Garden City who was awarded the George Cross for his heroism in rescuing others from a hotel fire at the Sappada Ski Resort in northeast Italy on 12 April 1976. Clements died in the blaze.

He was born on 25 August 1953, in Codicote, Hertfordshire. Notice of his posthumous award appeared in The London Gazette of 7 December 1976.

His story was one of those chosen for a series of posters which appeared on the London Underground. Codicote Football Club's ground was named the John Clements Memorial Ground in his honour.
