= Rugby Borough F.C. =

Association football club in England

Coordinates: 52°21′13.06″N 1°12′40.32″W

Rugby Borough
- Full name: Rugby Borough Football Club
- Founded: 2017
- Ground: Kilsby Lane, Rugby
- Manager: Dave Stringer
- League: Northern Premier League Division One Midlands
- 2025–26: Northern Premier League Division One Midlands, 16th of 22
- Website: rugbyboroughfc.co.uk
Home colours

Rugby Borough Football Club is a football club based in Rugby, Warwickshire. They are currently members of the Northern Premier League Division One Midlands and play at Kilsby Lane.

== History ==
The club was founded in 2017 "to give players from Rugby Town Juniors and its partners a place to continue playing football in the orange shirt into their adult years". They were placed in Division One of the Leicestershire Senior League, which they won at the first attempt, losing only three of their 31 matches with a goal difference of +168, resulting in promotion to the Premier Division. They went on to win the Premier Division title in 2018–19, but were denied promotion as their ground did not meet FA regulations. The 2018–19 season also saw the club compete in the FA Vase for the first time, defeating Malvern Town 3–2 in the first qualifying round, before losing to Bustleholme in the next round. The club ended the season by winning the Coventry Charity Cup with a 2–1 defeat of Coventry Alvis.

In 2021–22 Rugby were Premier Division champions again, this time earning promotion to Division One of the Spartan South Midlands League. They also won the Coventry Charity Cup for the second time, defeating Coventry Alvis 4–0 in the final. The following season the club finished third in Division One, qualifying for the promotion play-offs. After beating Amersham Town 4–0 in the semi-finals, they defeated Northampton ON Chenecks 2–0 in the final to earn promotion to the Premier Division South of the United Counties League. They also won the League Cup, beating Moulton 2–0 in the final.

The 2024–25 season saw Rugby finish third in the Premier Division South, before going on to beat March Town United 2–0 in the play-off semi-finals, and then defeat Aylestone Park 2–1 in the final to earn promotion to Division One Midlands of the Northern Premier League.

== Other teams ==
In June 2023 the club took over Coventry United Women following the club's relegation from the Women's Championship, re-branding them as Rugby Borough Women.

== Honours ==
- Spartan South Midlands League
  - League Cup winners 2022–23
- Leicestershire Senior League
  - Premier Division champions 2018–19, 2021–22
  - Division One champions 2017–18
- Coventry Charity Cup
  - Winners 2018–19, 2021–22

== Records ==
- Best FA Cup performance: First qualifying round, 2023–24
- Best FA Trophy performance: Preliminary round, 2025–26
- Best FA Vase performance: Third round, 2024–25

== See also ==
- Rugby Borough F.C. players
