= Codicote F.C. =

Association football club in England

Coordinates: 51°51′20″N 0°14′04″W

Codicote
- Full name: Codicote Football Club
- Nickname: The Cod
- Founded: 1913
- Ground: John Clements Memorial Ground, Codicote
- Chairman: Jim Bundy
- Manager: Marvin Samuel
- League: Spartan South Midlands League Division Two
- 2025–26: Spartan South Midlands League Division Two, 17th of 17
Home colours	Away colours

Codicote Football Club is a football club based in Codicote, near Hitchin, Hertfordshire, England. They are currently members of the Spartan South Midlands League Division Two and play at the John Clements Memorial Ground.

== History ==
The club was established in 1913 and joined the Eastern Division of the Hertfordshire County League in the same year. They had only one season in the league before the outbreak of World War I, but returned to the Eastern Division when football resumed in 1919, finishing bottom of the division in the 1919–20 season. They were moved into the North & East Division when the league was reorganised in 1921, and finished bottom of the division for the next two seasons. In 1923 the league was reduced to a single division, with the club again finishing bottom in 1923–24. The league was disbanded in 1925, only to be reformed in 1927 (with Codicote as members) and disbanded again in 1928.

Codicote subsequently joined the North Hertfordshire League, They won Division One in 1929–30 and the Greg Cup in 1932–33. After World War II they won the Division Two League Cup in 1949–50 and again in 1968–69, a season in which they were also Division Two champions. The club won Division One in 1974–75 and the Premier Division in 1977–78. By the mid-1980s they were back in Division One, winning the Division One League Cup in 1984–85. The 1989–90 season saw them win the Division One League Cup, the Benevolent Shield and the Greg Cup.

In 1993 the club were promoted to Division One the Hertfordshire Senior County League. Although they left the league in 2001, they returned to Division One in 2002. After finishing third in 2003–04, they were promoted to the Premier Division. A third-place finish in 2011–12 saw them promoted to Division One of the Spartan South Midlands League. In 2018–19 they finished second-from-bottom of Division One and were relegated to Division Two.

== Ground ==
The club plays at the John Clements Memorial Ground. The ground was named for John Clements, a headmaster at Sherrardswood School in nearby Welwyn Garden City who was killed in a fire at a ski resort in Sappada in 1976 whilst rescuing a number of children. Clements was born in Codicote and was subsequently awarded the George Cross. During the 1990s Knebworth also played at the ground.

With the club aiming to move up to the Spartan South Midlands League and spectator facilities being limited to a small covered stand between the two dugouts, Codicote spent two years groundsharing at Hertford Town's Hertingfordbury Park and then several years at Hatfield Town's Gosling Sports Park in Welwyn Garden City, before returning to the John Clements Memorial Ground in September 2016 after a new stand had been built.

== Honours ==
- North Hertfordshire League
  - Premier Division champions 1977–78
  - Division One champions 1929–30, 1974–75
  - Division Two champions 1968–69
  - Greg Cup winners 1932–33, 1974–75, 1989–90
  - Benevolent Shield winners 1974–75, 1989–90
  - Division One League Cup winners 1984–85, 1989–90
  - Division Two League Cup winners 1949–50, 1968–69
- Herts Centenary Senior Trophy
  - Winners 2005–06
- Welwyn Hospital Cup
  - Winners 1926–27, 1932–33, 1954–55, 1973–74

== Records ==
- Best FA Cup performance: Preliminary round, 2014–15
- Best FA Vase performance: First round, 2008–09, 2012–13

== See also ==
- Codicote F.C. players
- Codicote F.C. managers
