= Wormley Rovers F.C. =

Association football club in England

Coordinates: 51.7344°N 0.0293°W

Wormley Rovers
- Full name: Wormley Rovers Football Club
- Nickname: The Worms
- Founded: 1921
- Ground: Wormley Playing Fields, Wormley
- Chairman: Nigel Scully
- Manager: John Stevenson & Ryan Wade
- League: Spartan South Midlands League Premier Division
- 2025–26: Spartan South Midlands League Premier Division, 11th of 20
Home colours

Wormley Rovers Football Club is a football club based in Wormley, Hertfordshire. They are currently members of the Spartan South Midlands League Premier Division and play at Wormley Playing Fields.

== History ==
Wormley Football Club was founded in 1921, but folded in 1926. After failed attempts to reform the club during the 1930s, it was revived in 1946. They went on to have success in junior football between the late 1940s and early 1960s, after which the club joined Division Three of the Hertfordshire County League in 1976. They won the division at the first attempt, earning promotion to Division Two. After missing out on another promotion on goal difference in 1979–80, the club were runners-up in Division Two the following season and were promoted to Division One. In 1986–87 they won the Division One title, resulting in promotion to the Premier Division. Although they were relegated back to Division One after two seasons, they were Division One runners-up in 1991–92 and returned to the Premier Division.

Wormley spent the next 26 seasons in the Premier Division, finishing as runners-up in 1993–94, 1998–99, 1999–2000 and 2009–10, as well as reaching the final of the Herts Senior Centenary Trophy in 1999–2000 and 2000–01, losing 2–0 to Tring Athletic on both occasions. After a fifth-placed finish in 2017–18 they were promoted to Division One South of the Eastern Counties League. They reached the final of the Herts Senior Centenary Trophy in 2019–20, but the final was not played due to the COVID-19 pandemic and the club were jointly awarded the trophy with their opponents Oxhey Jets. In 2022–23 the club finished third in the division, qualifying for the promotion play-offs, in which they were beaten 2–0 by Sporting Bengal United in the semi-finals.

In 2023–24 Wormley were runners-up in Division One South, qualifying for the promotion play-offs. After beating Clapton Community 3–2 in the semi-finals, they defeated Dunmow Town 2–1 in the final to earn promotion to the Premier Division of the Spartan South Midlands League. The following season saw them finish fifth in the Premier Division, going on to beat Tring Athletic 2–1 in the play-off semi-finals, before losing the final against Maccabi London Lions on penalties.

== Ground ==
The original club played at Nursery Lane in neighbouring Turnford, where land had been donated by Joseph Rochford & Sons, a local horticultural company. In 1954 they relocated to the Wormley Playing Fields. Railing was installed around the pitch in 1990 and floodlights installed in 1994. In 2020 a 75-seat stand was built, with an existing standing area relocated to the Hedge End.

== Honours ==
- Herts Senior County League
  - Division One champions 1986–87
  - Division Three champions 1976–77
- Herts Senior Centenary Trophy
  - Winners 2019–20 (shared)

== Records ==
- Best FA Cup performance: Extra preliminary round, 2024–25, 2025–26
- Best FA Vase performance: Second round, 2026–27
