= Bovingdon F.C. =

Association football club in England

Bovingdon FC
- Full name: Bovingdon Football Club
- Nickname: Bovi
- Founded: 1910
- Ground: Green Lane, Bovingdon
- Capacity: 500
- Chairman: Steven Hutchins
- Team Manager: Kevin Godbold; Steven Hutchins
- League: Combined Counties League Division One
- 2025–26: Spartan South Midlands League Division Two, 5th of 17 (promoted)
Home colours

Bovingdon Football Club is a football club based in Bovingdon, England. They are currently members of the Combined Counties League Division One.

== History ==
Bovingdon joined the Hertfordshire Senior County League for the 1955–56 season. They remained in this league until the 2017–18 season, at the end of which they finished top of the Premier Division and so were promoted to the Spartan South Midlands League, where they stayed for eight seasons.

In 2026, the club was admitted into the Combined Counties League Division One. In light of this promotion, the club was granted permission by the Dacorum Borough Council to install 6 floodlighting columns at their Green Lane ground to meet step 6 standards.
