= Sherrardswood School =

Location
- Lockleys; Welwyn, Hertfordshire, AL6 0BJ; United Kingdom; 51.8284°N 0.2064°W

Information
- Former name: The High School
- Type: Private day school
- Religious affiliation: Christian
- Established: 1928
- Founder: Ethel Wragg
- Local authority: Hertfordshire County Council
- Oversight: Independent Schools Inspectorate
- Trust: Alpha Schools
- Department for Education URN: 117622 Tables
- Headmistress: Anna Wright
- Gender: Co-educational
- Age range: 2–18
- Enrolment: 467
- Capacity: 550
- Houses: Drake; Swift; Eagle
- Colour: Blue
- Website: www.sherrardswood.co.uk

Sherrardswood School is an independent, coeducational school for students aged two to eighteen, located in Welwyn, Hertfordshire, England. The school was founded in 1928 by Ethel Wragg. The current headmistress is Anna Wright. The current Chair of Governors is Ali Khan.

== History ==
In 2014, due to financial difficulties, the headmistress was made to resign and Ali Khan, owner of several for-profit private schools, became the new head of the governors. At some point later, Alpha Schools Ltd, Mr Khan's company, bought Sherrardswood School.

== John Clements ==
John Clements (GC), a schoolmaster at the school, was posthumously awarded the George Cross on 7 December 1976 for actions during a school ski trip that saved the lives of thirty-seven children.
