= Eaton Socon F.C. =

Coordinates: 52°13′26″N 0°16′41″W

Eaton Socon
- Full name: Eaton Socon Football Club
- Founded: 1867; 159 years ago
- Ground: River Road, St Neots
- Chairman: Nev Cooper
- League: Spartan South Midlands League Division One
- 2025–26: Spartan South Midlands League Division One, 3rd of 21
Home colours

Eaton Socon Football Club is an association football club based in the areas of Eaton Socon and Eaton Ford, St Neots, Cambridgeshire, England. They are currently members of the Spartan South Midlands League Division One and play at River Road, Eaton Ford, St Neots.

Famous players, John Gregory Northampton Town, Aston Villa, Brighton & Hove Albion, Queens Park Rangers, Derby County, Plymouth Argyle, Bolton Wanderers, Plus 6 England caps.

Wayne Larkins, Northamptonshire County Cricket Club, Durham County Cricket Club, 13 England Test Matches, 25 One Day Internationals. Was also on books of Notts County Football Club before choosing a very successful professional cricket career.

== History ==
Eaton Socon were formed in 1867. In 2005, the club joined the Cambridgeshire County League Premier Division, after winning the Senior Division A. In 2022, the club was admitted into the Spartan South Midlands League Division One.

== Ground ==
The club currently play at River Road, Eaton Ford, St Neots.
