= Everett Rovers F.C. =

Association football club in England

Everett Rovers
- Full name: Everett Rovers Football Club
- Founded: 1997
- Ground: Leggatts Playing Field, Dodd Road
- Chairman: Andy Tyers
- Manager: Steve Keightly
- League: Spartan South Midlands League Premier Division
- 2025–26: Spartan South Midlands League Division One, 1st of 21 (promoted)

Everett Rovers F.C. is a football club based in Garston, a suburb of Watford, Hertfordshire, England. They are currently members of the Spartan South Midlands League Premier Division, having won promotion from Division One in 2026.

== History ==
Everett Rovers were formed in March 1997, following a breakaway from another local club Herons Youth. They gained their name after holding their first community meeting inside the Bill Everett Community Centre, named after former Mayor of Watford Bill Everett.

The club predominantly operated in youth football with a senior men's team competing in the Watford Sunday League. In 2023, Everett Rovers had their application to join the Hertfordshire Senior County League accepted, and finished their debut season in 15th. The following season, Rovers applied to be eligible for promotion and finished 3rd, gaining promotion to the Spartan South Midlands Football League. The club secured back-to-back promotions to the Premier Division, winning the Division One title.

== Ground ==
Everett Rovers play their home matches at Leggatts Playing Field, Dodd Road. In February 2023, the club received £20,000 as a Neighbourhood Grant in order to build a new 3G pitch. In February 2026, Everett Rovers applied for planning permission to build two 50-seater spectator stands around the 3G pitch, in order to meet ground grading requirements. The stand opened in April of that year.

== Honours ==
- Spartan South Midlands Football League
  - Division One champions: 2025–26

== Records ==
- Best FA Vase performance: Second round, 2026–27
- Best FA Cup performance: Extra preliminary round, 2026–27
