= Baldock Town F.C. =

Association football club in England

Coordinates: 52°0′4″N 0°15′53″W

Baldock Town
- Full name: Baldock Town Football Club
- Nickname: The Reds
- Founded: 1905 (original club); 2003 (current club)
- Dissolved: 2001 (original club)
- Ground: Hitchin Road, Arlesey
- Capacity: 2,920 (150 seated)
- Chairman: Graham Kingham
- League: Spartan South Midlands League Premier Division
- 2025–26: Spartan South Midlands League Premier Division, 15th of 20
Home colours	Away colours

Baldock Town Football Club is a football club based in Baldock, Hertfordshire, England. Having originally been established in 1905, the current version of the club was established in 2003. They are currently members of Spartan South Midlands League Premier Division and groundshare with Arlesey Town at their Hitchin Road ground.

== History ==
The club were founded in 1905 as Baldock Football Club, and joined the Northern Division of the Herts County League for the 1905–06 season. They won the division in 1920–21 and finished as runners-up in the championship play-off. In 1921 they were renamed Baldock Town, and league reorganisation saw them placed in the North Eastern Division. The league was reduced to a single division in 1923, and the 1924–25 season saw the club finish as runners-up. However, the league was disbanded at the end of the season, and the club joined Division One of the Bedfordshire & District County League (later renamed the South Midlands League), with the reserves playing in Division Two. They won the league in 1927–28, and although they finished bottom of Division One in 1929–30, they avoided being relegated to Division Two. They remained in Division One until World War II.

After the war Baldock rejoined the Herts County League, finishing bottom of Division One in 1946–47. They then switched back to the South Midlands League, winning Division Two in 1947–48 and earning promotion to Division One; the reserves subsequently joined Division Two. The club won Division One in 1949–50 and were promoted to the Premier Division. After finishing as runners-up in 1953–54, they left the league, switching to the Parthenon League. They remained in the league for five seasons, before joining the Senior Division of the London League, finishing bottom of the division in 1959–60. However, after four seasons they rejoined the Premier Division of the South Midlands League. They subsequently won the league in 1965–66, 1967–68 and 1969–70.

In 1983 Baldock switched to the Premier Division of the United Counties League, finishing as runners-up in their first season. After finishing as runners-up again in 1986–87, they were promoted to the Southern Division of the Southern League. They remained in the division until the end of the 1994–95 season, which saw them finish as runners-up, earning promotion to the Premier Division. However, they were relegated back to the Southern Division at the end of the 1996–97 season. In 1999 the club was transferred to the Eastern Division when the league was restructured. After the 2000–01 season they left the league and folded.

In 2003 the club was reformed as Baldock, with the team composed of former members of the Baldock Town youth team. They joined Division One of the North Hertfordshire League. After finishing third in 2004–05, they were promoted to the Premier Division. The club were founder members of the North & Mid Herts League in 2006, and were placed in the Premier Division. During the year the club was renamed Baldock Town. After finishing as runners-up in the Premier Division, they were promoted to Division One of the Herts County League. They won the division at the first attempt, earning promotion to the Premier Division. In 2008 they were renamed again, this time becoming Baldock Town Letchworth following a move to playing home matches in Letchworth. However, they reverted to being Baldock Town in 2011 after returning to Baldock.

The club won the Premier Division in 2011–12 but were denied promotion due to their ground failing the necessary ground grading. After finishing as runners-up the following season, they were promoted to Division One of the Spartan South Midlands League after agreeing a groundshare in nearby Hitchin. After finishing third in Division One in 2015–16 and 2016–17, they were Division One runners-up in 2017–18, earning promotion to the Premier Division.

== Ground ==
The original club played at Elmswood Manor on William Road, Walls Common on Penthouse Lane, Elm park and then an enclosed ground at Bakers Close until 1981, when they moved to the Norton Road ground. A 250-seat grandstand was built in 1983 at a cost of £8,000; two covered terraces were erected on either side of the grandstand, which became known as 'Charlie's Cowshed'. Another stand with bench seating was built on the other side of the pitch, with uncovered terraces behind both goals.

After reforming in 2003 the club played at Knights Templar Sports Centre and Bakers Close. However, following their Herts County League Division One title in 2007–08, the club moved to the County Ground in Letchworth. In 2011 they returned to Baldock to play at Norton Road, which had been renamed the North Herts Arena.

The club were denied promotion in 2012 due to the 3G pitch and perimeter fence not meeting the grading requirements for the Spartan South Midlands League. As a result, the club agreed a groundshare with Hitchin Town to play at Hitchin's Top Field ground. In May 2015, the club announced they would move to Stotfold to play at Stotfold F.C.'s Roker Park. After two years at Stotfold, they relocated to Arlesey Town's Hitchin Road ground in 2017.

== Honours ==
- South Midlands League
  - Champions 1927–28, 1965–66, 1967–68, 1969–70
  - Division One champions 1949–50
  - Division Two champions 1947–48
- Herts County League
  - Premier Division champions 2011–12
  - Division One champions 2007–08
  - Northern Division champions 1920–21
- Herts Charity Shield
  - Winners 1957–58, 1969–70
- Herts Senior Centenary Trophy
  - Winners 2012–13, 2017–18
- Anagram Records Trophy
  - Winners 2011–12, 2012–13

== Records ==
- Highest league position: 18th in the Southern League Premier Division, 1994–95
- Best FA Cup performance: Fourth qualifying round, 1991–92, 1999–00
- Best FA Trophy performance: Second round, 1998–99
- Best FA Vase performance: Fifth round, 1983–84

== See also ==
- Baldock Town F.C. players
- Baldock Town F.C. managers
