= Letchworth Garden City Eagles F.C. =

Coordinates: 51°58′31″N 0°12′17″W

Letchworth Garden City Eagles
- Full name: Letchworth Garden City Eagles Football Club
- Founded: 1979; 47 years ago
- Ground: Pixmore Pitches, Letchworth
- Chairman: Simon Efford
- Manager: Mark Nunn
- League: Spartan South Midlands League Division One
- 2025–26: Spartan South Midlands League Division One, 16th of 21
Home colours

Letchworth Garden City Eagles Football Club is a football club based in Letchworth, England. They are currently members of the Spartan South Midlands League Division One and play at Pixmore Pitches.

== History ==
Westbury United were formed in 1979, later changing their name to Westbury Eagles and later to Garden City Eagles. During the early 1980s, the club changed their name to Letchworth Garden City Eagles. In 2008, the club joined the Hertfordshire Senior County League Division One, winning the league two years later. Upon promotion to the Premier Division, the club finished as runners-up in 2011, 2015 and 2018, before winning the league in 2019. In 2021, the club was admitted into the Spartan South Midlands League Division One.

== Ground ==
The club currently play at Pixmore Pitches in Letchworth, next to the Hertfordshire FA headquarters.

== Records ==
- Best FA Vase performance: First round, 2024–25
