= Royston Town F.C. =

Association football club in England

Coordinates: 52°03′10″N 0°01′00″W

Royston Town
- Full name: Royston Town Football Club
- Nickname: The Crows
- Founded: 1875
- Ground: Garden Walk, Royston
- Capacity: 5,000 (300 Seated)
- Chairman: Steve Jackson
- Manager: Chris Watters
- League: Southern League Division One Central
- 2025–26: Southern League Premier Division Central, 21st of 22 (relegated)
- Website: http://www.roystontownfc.co.uk
Home colours	Away colours

Royston Town Football Club (also known as The Crows) are an English football club based in Royston, Hertfordshire, England, and have played their home games at Garden Walk since 1932.

Founded in 1875, it is the third oldest club in Hertfordshire, behind Hitchin Town and Bishop's Stortford. They reached the fifth round of the FA Vase in 2009–10 for the first time in their history, and the fourth qualifying round of the FA Cup in 2019–20, losing to Maldon & Tiptree in front of a record crowd of 1,152 at Garden Walk. The Crows also reached the quarter final of the Buildbase FA Trophy in 2019–20 losing to eventual finalists Concord Rangers. They won the Spartan South Midlands League Premier Division in 2011–12, and now play in the Southern League Division One Central.

== History ==
Royston Town, nicknamed "The Crows", was formed in 1875 and are the third oldest club in Hertfordshire. One of the first traces of the club was in October 1875 when Royston visited Saffron Walden. The game was played at Saffron Walden Common. This game was re-lived in October 1975 to celebrate the Essex club's centenary year.

After this, there was a period up to the early 1900s when little was known about the club's history but just before the Great War (1914–18) it is known that there were two clubs in existence, the other club being known as the 'Non-Cons', short for Non-Conformists.

After the First World War, the club entered the Buntingford & District League and in 1921, when the club was affiliated to the Cambs F.A. they won the Creake Shield.

The club's first major honour came in the guise of the Herts County Premier League title in 1969–70 and they repeated the feat in 1972–73 and 1976–77. In 1978, they rejoined the South Midlands League and won the Division One title for the first time of asking. Success continued with a Cup Final appearance in the Herts Charity Shield for the first time in 1979 and runners up spot in the South Midlands League Premier Division in 1980. The Herts Charity Shield was won in 1981–82 and two years later the club joined the Isthmian League Division Two North where they remained for six years.

In 1990, the club lifted the Herts Charity Shield again with a 1–0 defeat of Pirton. However, after a bright start to the following season, the club dropped from 6th place to 16th. As a result, were relegated to Division Three where they remained until resigning from the Isthmian League at the end of the 1993–94 season despite finishing in 8th spot. The club had never been particularly well supported and was instructed to construct a new stand behind the dugouts opposite the existing stand at an estimated £20,000. Rather than comply with the ruling, Royston resigned from the Isthmian League after ten seasons. It was during this season that the club achieved its highest official attendance of 876 with the visit of Aldershot Town.

The resignation meant a return to the South Midlands League for the 1994–95 season and with Tony Galvin in charge not only did the club finish in a creditable 4th place, but they also captured the South Midlands League Floodlight Cup with a 2–1 defeat of Sawbridgeworth Town. The following season saw a 6th-place finish and the departure of Tony Galvin. Paddy Butcher took over as player/manager having returned to the club from Ware. Prior to going to Ware, he had played for the Crows for over seven seasons and was the leading goalscorer in all of them.

In 1996–97, the club finished 6th in the league again and won the Herts Charity Shield for the third time. 1997–98 saw the club finish 4th in the Premier Division, but concluded with the departure of Paddy Butcher.

The club started the 1998–99 season with a new manager and coach partnership, Kevin Pugh and Sam Salamone who had steered Standon & Puckeridge to a 17-point winning margin in the 1997–98 Herts County League Division One. However, after a disappointing season in 2000–01 the Crows saw the departure of Pugh and Salamone. With a first-team coach, Gavin Head taking over the mantle of manager for the 2001–02 season, aided by a backroom staff of Tony Faulkner (first-team coach) and Paul Attfield (reserve and youth Team Manager), the first team finished eighth in the Premier Division. However, following the resignation of Gavin Head in October 2002, the first team manager's position was taken up by Peter Theo.

In March 2003, Peter Baker became first team manager. Baker continued the following season with a completely new management team of Mark Saggers (assistant manager), Brian Cannon (coach), Tyronne Parry (reserve team manager) and Billy Jones (youth team manager).

Having built a firm base of local talent, Peter Baker stood down as manager during the close season, and the position of first team manager for the 2005–06 season was taken up jointly by Mark Saggers and Brian Cannon. Tyronne Parry continued to run the reserve team in a bid to restore their Division 1 status, with the youth team being run by new managers Kevin Wilson and John Bloss. After a poor 2005–06 season, with the Crows, narrowly avoiding relegation, Saggers and Cannon left the club.

The Crows started the 2006–07 season with another new manager, Phil Snowden, who had been First Team Coach under Paddy Butcher up until the end of the 1997–98 season, followed by a period of coaching at Enfield Town. The reserves continued to be run by Tyronne Parry, and Kevin Wilson and John Bloss stepped up to restart a Royston Town 'A' side playing out of Barkway in the K.B. Tyres and Mercury League. The youth team was managed by Stewart McDonald and coached by former club goalkeeper Simon Dobson. However, after another inconsistent season, the Crows were relegated to Spartan South Midlands League Division One. Despite this setback, the Committee decided to keep faith with the management team.

Craig Hammond Presentation.

However, after a poor run of league results, Snowden resigned in November 2007 and was replaced by Paul Attfield from Buntingford Town with Tony Galvin returning to Garden Walk as first team coach. Also, in November, reserve team manager Tyronne Parry resigned leaving Royston Town 'A' managers Kevin Wilson and John Bloss to step up a level.

Chairman Graham Phillips stood down after nearly ten years at the helm and was replaced by Robert Stewart, owner of Stevenage Packaging Ltd. Within a fortnight of arriving, Royston Town had signed their first player for a fee in their history, in the form of former youth and first team player, Craig Hammond from Mildenhall Town for an undisclosed fee. At the end of January 2008, Rob Stewart had to resign due to work commitments. For the 2008–09 season former Town favourite Duncan Easley was appointed Paul Attfield's assistant manager. Steve Jackson was unveiled as the club's new chairman at the end of August. Attfield resigned due to ill health on 5 November 2013.

The South Midlands Division One championship was secured in the 2008–09 season and three years later a further promotion was secured in the 2011–12 season. Six other cups were won in the same period with the South Midlands Floodlit Cup won four seasons in a row.

== Stadium ==
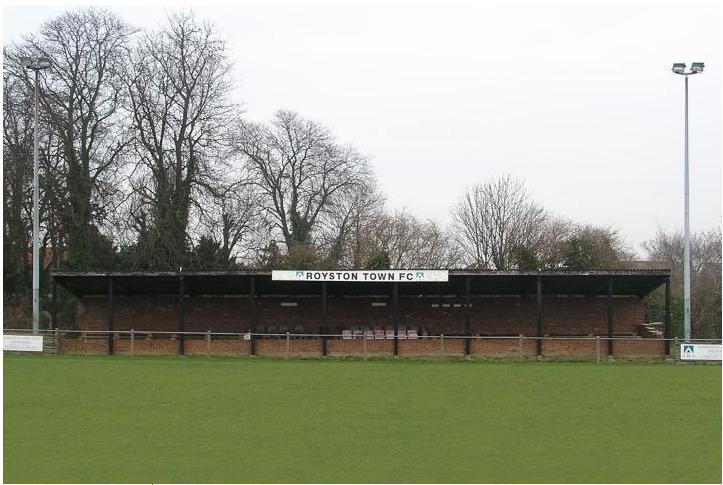
Stand at Garden Walk

Garden Walk has been the home of Royston Town F.C. since 1932. The clubhouse and dressing rooms are behind the near goal and were constructed in 1974, while the floodlights were switched on in 1981. One of the legacies of their spell in the Isthmian League is the stand at Garden Walk, positioned mid-way along the far touchline on the cemetery side of the ground. Erected in 1984, it replaced an earlier timber structure and is constructed largely from brick with a sloping metal roof supported by ten posts. The official seated capacity is 300, in two stands. In 2017–18, three new stands were erected at Garden Walk – two all seater and one standing only.

Royston Town fans.

== Players ==
=== Current squad ===
As of 1 August 2023

Note: Flags indicate national team as defined under FIFA eligibility rules; some limited exceptions apply. Players may hold more than one non-FIFA nationality.

Pos.	Nation	Player
GK	ENG	Ruben Rabstein
DF	ENG	James Brighton
DF	ENG	Taylor Parr
DF	ENG	Adam Murray
DF	ENG	Archie Locke
DF	ENG	Harvey Beckett
MF	ENG	Alfie Warman

Pos.	Nation	Player
MF	ENG	Josh Caldicott Stevens
DF	ENG	Josh Dawodu
MF	ENG	Andronicus Georgiou
FW	ENG	Kian Harness
FW	ENG	Cemal Ramadan
FW	ENG	Joey Iaciofano

The Southern Football League does not use a squad numbering system.

== Officials ==
- President: Alan Barlow
- Chairman: Steve Jackson
- Secretary: Terry McKinnell
- Treasurer: Geoff Gill
- Football Fixture Secretary (Seniors): Steve Endacott
- Programme Editor: Neil MacLeod
- Website Editor: Steve Endacott
- Executive Committee: Andy Toovey, Eric Joyce, Chris Coote, Duncan Easley, Neil MacLeod, David Baulk, Matt Clowery, Steve Tuck, Angela Baulk
- Youth Football Rep: Giles Parnwell

== Management team ==
Position	Name
First Team Manager	(England) Chris Watters
Fitness Coach	(England) Scott Taylor
Reserve Team Manager	(England) Franco Nacca
Under 18's Team Manager	Roy Smith
Women's Team Manager	(England) Lewis Endacott
Vets Team Manager	Lee Wilkinson
Sports Injury Therapist	(England)

== Managerial history ==
Manager	Period
(England) Steve Castle	2013–2023
(England) Paul Attfield	2007–2013
(England) Phil Snowden	2006–2007
(England) Mark Saggers and Brian Cannon	2005–2006
(England) Peter Baker	2003–2005
(England) Peter Theo	2002–2003
(England) Gavin Head	2001–2002
(England) Kevin Pugh and Sam Salamone	1998–2001
(England) Paddy Butcher	1996–1998
(Republic of Ireland) Tony Galvin	1994–1996

== Records ==
- Best FA Cup performance: Fourth qualifying round, 2019–20
- Best FA Trophy performance: Quarter-finals, 2019–20
- Best FA Vase performance: Fifth round, 2009–10

== Honours ==
Winners:

- 1929–30 – Cambridgeshire League Division 2
- 1969–70 – Herts County League (Div 1)
- 1972–73 – Herts County League (Div 1)
- 1976–77 – Herts County League (Premier Div)
- 1977–78 – South Midlands League (Div 1)
- 1978–79 – South Midlands Reserve League (Div 2) and North Herts (Div IV) League Cup
- 1979–80 – South Midlands Reserve League (Div 1) and North Herts (Div IV) League Cup
- 1981–82 – Herts Charity Shield
- 1988–89 – Herts Intermediate Cup and Televised Sports League
- 1989–90 – Chiltern Youth League (Div 1) and Herts Charity Shield
- 1992–93 – South Combinations Reserve Floodlight Cup and Chiltern Youth League Cup
- 1994–95 – South Midlands Floodlit Cup
- 1995–96 – South Midlands Challenge Trophy
- 1996–97 – Herts Charity Shield
- 1998–99 – Eastern Region Women's League (Div 2)
- 2001–02 – Eastern Counties Youth League Cup
- 2006–07 – K.B. Tyres Division 3 Champions
- 2008–09 – South Midlands Division One Champions and Division One League Cup Winners, South Midlands Reserve Division Two East Champions and Reserve League Challenge Cup Winners
- 2008–09 – South Midlands Floodlit Cup
- 2009–10 – South Midlands Floodlit Cup and South Midlands Floodlit Reserve Cup
- 2010–11 – South Midlands Floodlit Cup
- 2011–12 – South Midlands Premier Division Winners. South Midlands Premier Division Cup Winners, South Midlands Floodlit Cup
- 2012–13 - Hinchingbrooke Cup (Joint Winners with Yaxley FC), Suburban Reserve League North Division Champions
- 2016–17 – Southern Football League Division One Central
- 2021–22 – Southern Football League Cup

Runners-Up:

- 1978–79 – South Midlands Challenge Cup and Herts Charity Shield
- 1979–80 – South Midlands League (Prem Div) and North Herts (Div IV)
- 1981–82 – North Herts (Div III)
- 1982–83 – North Herts (Div II) and South Midlands Reserve Section Trophy
- 1986–87 – Chiltern Youth League Cup
- 1992–93 – Herts County Youth Cup
- 1993–94 – North Herts (Div 1)
- 1995–96 – South Midlands Floodlit Cup
- 1998–99 – Herts Charity Shield and Herts F.A. Women's Cup
- 1999–00 – Eastern Regions Women's League (Div 1)
- 2001–02 – Eastern Junior Plate and Herts F.A. Women's Cup
- 2004–05 – Herts Charity Shield
- 2008–09 – Herts Charity Shield
- 2009–10 – South Midland Reserve League Challenge Cup
- 2010–11 – South Midlands Floodlit Reserve Cup

== Former players ==
1. Players that have played/managed in the Football League or any foreign equivalent to this level (i.e. fully professional league).
2. Players with full international caps.
3. Players that hold a club record or have captained the club.

- (England) Dave Donaldson – (1984–Unknown)
- (England) Will Norris – (2011–2012, 2013)
