= Stotfold F.C. =

Association football club in England

Coordinates: 52°01′18″N 0°13′22″W

Stotfold FC
- Full name: Stotfold Football Club
- Nickname: The Eagles
- Founded: 1946; 80 years ago
- Ground: The JSJ Stadium; New Roker Park; Arlesey Road; Stotfold
- Capacity: 1,500
- Chairman: Rob Parkin
- Manager: Eddie McLoughlin
- League: Southern League Division One Central
- 2025–26: Southern League Division One Central, 17th of 22
Home colours	Away colours

Stotfold Football Club is a football club based at Stotfold, Bedfordshire, England. They play in the Southern League Division One Central. The club is affiliated to the Bedfordshire County Football Association.

== History ==
The first recorded football in Stotfold occurred in 1904 although it is certain the game was played in the town for a number of years before that. In the early 1900s, Stotfold sides played in the Biggleswade and District League. This was followed by a spell of nearly 30 years in North Herts football. The first record of a trophy being won was 1911 when Potton were beaten 1–0 in the Biggleswade and District Championship.

Stotfold FC was officially founded, with proper financing, stewardship and record-keeping, in 1946. The club played for many years at the Hitchin Road Recreation Ground before moving into the newly developed Roker Park ground in 1965. This ground was just a meadow named "Roker" when it was first used by Stotfold Athletic in 1911.

In 1951, the club joined the South Midlands League Division Two, finishing 2nd to gain immediate promotion to Division One. They were Division One champions in 1953–54 and were promoted to the Premier Division, where they remained for thirty years. Stotfold won the South Midlands League Premier Division for the first time in the 1980–81 season under the management team of Brian Parker, Peter Godden, and Geoff Heard. They were also runners-up seven times.

In 1984, the Eagles were transferred to the United Counties League. They were admitted straight into the Premier Division, where they stayed until 2010. Through the 1990s, the club generally finished high in the top ten. After several changes of manager, the club re-appointed former Arsenal man Ian Allinson as manager for 2007–08, and he rewarded them by leading the club to their most successful season, including the UCL championship for the first time. He subsequently left to join Boreham Wood. The championship was clinched in dramatic fashion; starting the second half 0–4 down to closest challengers Long Buckby, Stotfold managed to equalise in the 90th minute for the point needed to clinch the title.

Stotfold transferred to the Spartan South Midlands League for the 2010–11 season. They remained in the Premier Division before being relegated to Division One on the last day of the 2018–19 campaign.

Stotfold achieved a landmark for the club in February 2020 when they moved to their brand new £2m step 4 ready stadium at New Roker Park on Arlesey Road.

== Former players ==
1. Players that have played/managed in the football league or any foreign equivalent to this level (i.e. fully professional league).
2. Players with full international caps.
3. Players that hold a club record or have captained the club.

- (England) Mitchell Cole – (2011)
- (England) Josh Coley – (2020)
- (England) Darren Dykes – (2005–06)
- (England) Graeme Tomlinson – (2003–04)
- (England) Ian Allinson – (2005–08)
- (Northern Ireland) Phil Gray – (2005)
- (Republic of Ireland) Liam George – (2005)

== Management Team ==
- (England) Manager – Eddie McLoughlin
- (England) First Team Assistant Manager – Craig Meyrick
- (England) First Team Assistant Manager – Dan Norris
- (England) First Team Coach – Carl Smith
- (England) First Team Assistant Coach – Tony Kavanagh
- (England) Goalkeeper Coach – Louis O'Neill
- (England) Physio – Joe Green
- (England) Reserve Team Manager – Paul Lilly
- (England) Reserve Team Assistant Manager – Toby Ashdown
- (England) Reserve Team Assistant Manager – Olly Jenkins-Warr

== Honours ==
- United Counties League Premier Division
  - Champions 2007–08
  - Runners-up 1993–94, 1995–96, 2008–09
- South Midlands League Premier Division
  - Champions 1980–81
  - Runners-up 1955–56, 1957–58, 1958–59, 1959–60, 1963–64, 1965–66, 1977–78
- Spartan South Midlands League Premier Division
  - Runners-up 2022–23
- South Midlands League Division 1
  - Champions 1953–54
- Spartan South Midlands League Division 1
  - Champions 2021–22
- South Midlands League Division 2
  - Runners-up 1951–52
- United Counties League Knock-Out Cup
  - Winners 1999, 2000
- South Midlands League Challenge Trophy
  - Winners 1982
- Spartan South Midlands League Challenge Trophy
  - Runners-up 2014, 2022
- Spartan South Midlands League Senior Floodlight Cup
  - Runners-up 2014
- Spartan South Midlands League Division 1 Cup
  - Runners-up 2022
- Bedfordshire County Football Association Senior Cup
  - Winners 1965, 1994, 2000, 2008
  - Runners-up 2001
- Bedfordshire County Football Association Premier Cup
  - Winners 1982, 1992, 1999
- Bedfordshire County Football Association Intermediate Cup
  - Winners 1959, 1992, 1998, 2002
  - Runners-up 2009
- Bedfordshire County Football Association Senior Trophy
  - Winners 2020, 2022

Biggleswade Knock-Out Cup

  - Winners 1998, 2000, 2007, 2008, 2009, 2013
  - Runners-up 2010

North Bedfordshire Charity Cup

  - Winners 1956, 1957, 1962, 1982, 1988, 1991, 1998, 2003, 2010

Southern Combination Cup

  - Winners 1995, 1996

Hinchingbrooke Cup

  - Winners 2000
  - Runners-up 2014

== Records ==
- FA Cup
  - Third Qualifying Round 2007–08
- FA Trophy
  - First Qualifying Round 2023–24, 2024–25, 2025–26, 2026-27
- FA Vase
  - Fourth Round 1994–95, 1997–98, 2000–01, 2009–10
