= Hertfordshire Senior County League =

Association football league in England

- Founded: 1898
- Country: England
- Divisions: 6
- Number of clubs: 33
- Level on pyramid: Level 11 (Premier Division)
- Feeder to: Spartan South Midlands Football League
- Relegation to: Hertford and District Football League
- Current champions: Chipperfield Corinthians (Premier Division); Everett Rovers Reserves (Division One); Croxley Green (Division Two); Old Minchendenians (Division Three); Wormley Rovers U23 (Division Four); Tansley Vets (Division Five); Elizabeth Allen Old Boys Reserves (Division Six); (2025–26)
- Website: Official website

The Hertfordshire Senior County League is a football competition based in Hertfordshire, England. Founded in 1898, there are currently two divisions at senior level and four divisions at reserve and development level. Sitting at step 7 of the National League System, the Premier Division is a feeder to the Spartan South Midlands Football League. The League operates a knock-out competition called the Norman Appleby Trophy and Chipperfield Corinthians are the current holders (2026).

== Current members 2026–27 ==
=== Premier Division ===
- AFC Turnford
- Allenburys Sports
- Buntingford Town
- Cheshunt Development
- Chipperfield Corinthians
- Cockfosters Reserves
- Cuffley
- Everett Rovers Reserves
- Hinton
- Norsemen
- Owens
- St Margaretsbury
- Ware United
- Westmill

=== Division One ===
- Baldock Town Reserves
- Chipperfield Corinthians Reserves
- Chorleywood Common
- Codicote Development
- Croxley Green
- Cuffley Reserves
- Enfield Rangers
- Hatfield United
- Lemsford
- Letchworth Garden City Eagles U23
- Norsemen Reserves
- OIR
- Oxhey

=== Division Two ===
- Buntingford Town Reserves
- Elizabeth Allen Old Boys
- Evergreen
- Hinton Reserves
- Knebworth
- Norsemen Third
- Old Minchendenians
- Old Parmiterians
- Sandridge Rovers
- Totteridge & Whetstone
- Ware United Reserves
- Wormley Rovers U23

=== Division Three ===
- Amersham Town Development
- Bengeo Trinity
- Glenn Sports Titans
- Harlow United
- Harpenden Colts
- Hemel Hempstead Rovers
- Hertford Heath Development
- Norsemen Fourth
- Northgate Athletic
- Oxhey Jets 'A'
- Underdogs
- Welwyn United

=== Division Four ===
- Bengeo Trinity Reserves
- Bury Rangers
- Bushey Rangers
- Croxley Green Reserves
- Enfield Rangers Reserves
- Hemel Hempstead Rovers Reserves
- Kings Sports
- Letchworth Garden City Eagles U21
- Norsemen Fifth
- Owens Reserves
- St Margaretsbury Reserves
- Tansley Veterans

=== Division Five ===
- Bricket Wood
- Bullys Crusaders
- Chipperfield Corinthians Third
- Elizabeth Allen Old Boys Reserves
- FC Hurricanes
- Hoddesdon Town U23
- Lemsford Reserves
- MKS Evolution
- Owens Third
- Oxhey Reserves
- WD Herons

=== Division Six ===
- Birchwood
- Bury Rangers Second
- Evergreen Reserves
- GT United
- Harvesters
- Hemel Hempstead Rovers 'A'
- Hertford Heath 'A'
- Hinton U23
- St Ippolyts
- Ware United Third
- Watton U23
- Welwyn Corepoint
