= 2023–24 Spartan South Midlands Football League =

The 2023–24 season was the 27th in the history of the Spartan South Midlands Football League, a football competition in England. The league operates three divisions, two of which are in covered in this article, the Premier Division, at Step 5 and Division One at Step 6 of the English football league system.

The constitution was announced on 15 May 2023. Starting this season, the Step 5 Premier Division in the league promotes two clubs; one as champions and one via a four-team play-off. This replaced the previous inter-step play-off system. For this season only, there would have been only one club relegated from the Step 5 division.

== Premier Division ==
Spartan South Midlands Football League Premier Division
- Season: 2023–24
- Champions: Real Bedford
- Promoted: Real Bedford; Leverstock Green
- Matches: 342
- Goals: 1,201 (3.51 per match)
- Top goalscorer: Joseph Evans (Real Bedford) (31 goals)
- Biggest home win: Milton Keynes Irish 8–0 Potton United (17 October 2023)
- Biggest away win: Shefford Town & Campton 0–7 Real Bedford (27 December 2023)
- Highest scoring: Baldock Town 6–3 Crawley Green (9 September 2023); Real Bedford 8–1 Colney Heath (7 October 2023); Baldock Town 7–2 Shefford Town & Campton (17 October 2023)

The Premier Division featured 14 clubs which competed in the division last season, along with six new clubs:

- FC Romania, relegated from the Southern League
- London Lions, transferred from the Combined Counties League
- Milton Keynes Irish, transferred from the United Counties League
- Real Bedford, promoted from Division One
- Sawbridgeworth Town, transferred from the Essex Senior League
- Stansted, transferred from the Essex Senior League

=== League table ===
Pos	Team	Pld	W	D	L	GF	GA	GD	Pts	Promotion, qualification or relegation
1	Real Bedford	36	28	7	1	117	24	+93	91	Promoted to the Southern League
2	Milton Keynes Irish	36	26	7	3	96	25	+71	85	Qualified for the play-offs
3	Harpenden Town	36	21	5	10	74	51	+23	68	Qualified for the play-offs
4	Leverstock Green	36	20	8	8	73	53	+20	68	Qualified for the play-offs, then promoted to the Southern League
5	FC Romania	36	18	7	11	76	64	+12	61	Qualified for the play-offs
6	Tring Athletic	36	17	8	11	63	51	+12	59	
7	Colney Heath	36	18	3	15	57	45	+12	57	
8	Cockfosters	36	15	10	11	71	56	+15	55	
9	Potton United	36	14	8	14	50	57	−7	50	
10	London Lions	36	13	7	16	74	75	−1	46	
11	Aylesbury Vale Dynamos	36	13	7	16	58	78	−20	46	
12	Biggleswade United	36	12	7	17	67	80	−13	43	
13	Dunstable Town	36	10	10	16	51	64	−13	40	
14	Stansted	36	11	7	18	47	67	−20	40	Transferred to the Essex Senior League
15	Baldock Town	36	11	4	21	61	83	−22	34 (Note: Baldock Town were deducted 3 points.)	
16	Arlesey Town	36	9	7	20	36	69	−33	34	
17	Crawley Green	36	9	6	21	51	85	−34	33	
18	Shefford Town & Campton	36	9	6	21	50	91	−41	33	
19	Sawbridgeworth Town	36	2	8	26	29	83	−54	14	Transferred to the Essex Senior League
20	St Panteleimon	0	0	0	0	0	0	0	0	Folded (Note: St Panteleimon folded on 28 March 2024 with immediate effect.)

Source: The FA Full-Time
Rules for classification: 1) points; 2) goal difference; 3) number of goals scored; 4) number of matches won; 5) head-to-head results

=== Play-offs ===
Semi-finals
2	Milton Keynes Irish	0
5	FC Romania	3
3	Harpenden Town	1
4	Leverstock Green	3

Final
4	Leverstock Green	3
5	FC Romania	0

==== Semifinals ====
1 May 2024	Harpenden Town	1–3	Leverstock Green	Harpenden
19:45 GMT	Locke	Report	Seale 4'; Stefanoaica 38'; Mooney 70'	Stadium: Rothamsted Park; Attendance: 917; Referee: Nathan Currey

1 May 2024	Milton Keynes Irish	0–3	FC Romania	Milton Keynes
19:45 GMT		Report	Mendes 47', 90'; Balogun 72'	Stadium: The Irish Centre; Attendance: 405; Referee: Daniel Jones

==== Final ====
6 May 2024	Leverstock Green	3–0	FC Romania	Leverstock Green
15:00 GMT	Pett 49'; Neal 77'; Seale 80'	Report		Stadium: Pancake Lane; Attendance: 914; Referee: Chad Greatorex

=== Stadia and locations ===
Locations of the Premier Division clubs
Locations of the Premier Division clubs (Hertfordshire)

Team	Stadium	Capacity
Arlesey Town	Hitchin Road	2,920
Baldock Town	Hitchin Road	2,920
Aylesbury Vale Dynamos	Haywood Way	
Biggleswade United	Fairfield Road	2,000
Cockfosters	Chalk Lane	1,000
Colney Heath	Recreation Ground	
Crawley Green	The Brache	4,000
Dunstable Town	Creasey Park	3,065
FC Romania	Theobalds Lane (groundshare with Cheshunt)	3,000
Harpenden Town	Rothamsted Park	
Leverstock Green	Pancake Lane	
London Lions	Rowley Lane	
Milton Keynes Irish	Manor Fields	1,500
Potton United	The Hollow	
Real Bedford	McMullen Park	
Sawbridgeworth Town	Crofters End	2,500
Shefford Town & Campton	Shefford Sports Club	1,000
St Panteleimon	Hertingfordbury Park (groundshare with Hertford Town)	
Stansted	Hargrave Park	2,000
Tring Athletic	Grass Roots Stadium	

== Division One ==
Spartan South Midlands Football League Division One
- Season: 2023–24
- Champions: Northampton ON Chenecks
- Promoted: Northampton ON Chenecks; Northampton Sileby Rangers; Winslow United
- Relegated: Burton Park Wanderers
- Matches: 380
- Goals: 1,448 (3.81 per match)
- Top goalscorer: Nathanael Ansu (Moulton); Lewis Irwin (Northampton ON Chenecks) (32 goals)
- Biggest home win: Ampthill Town 8–0 Burton Park Wanderers (7 October 2023); Royston Town U23 8–0 Irchester United (5 December 2023); Long Buckby 9–1 Huntingdon Town (3 February 2024)
- Biggest away win: Letchworth Garden City Eagles 0–7 Northampton ON Chenecks (21 October 2023); Irchester United 0–7 Cranfield United (16 April 2024)
- Highest scoring: Burton Park Wanderers 3–8 Langford (14 October 2023)

Division One featured twelve clubs which competed in the division last season, along with eight new clubs:

- Cranfield United, promoted from the Bedfordshire County League
- Huntingdon Town, transferred from the Eastern Counties League
- Irchester United, promoted from the Northamptonshire Combination League
- Leighton Town development, promoted from Division Two
- Long Buckby, relegated from the United Counties League
- Rothwell Corinthians, relegated from the United Counties League
- Royston Town U23, promoted from the Hertfordshire Senior County League

Also, Buckingham Athletic merged with Division Two club Buckingham United to form the new club Buckingham.

=== League table ===
Pos	Team	Pld	W	D	L	GF	GA	GD	Pts	Promotion, qualification or relegation
1	Northampton ON Chenecks	38	29	8	1	102	23	+79	95	Promoted to the United Counties League
2	Northampton Sileby Rangers	38	24	6	8	98	46	+52	78	Qualified for the play-offs, then promoted to the United Counties League
3	Winslow United	38	23	7	8	85	50	+35	76	Qualified for the play-offs, then promoted to the Premier Division
4	Moulton	38	22	8	8	84	48	+36	74	Qualified for the play-offs
5	Wellingborough Whitworth	38	22	8	8	95	61	+34	74	Qualified for the play-offs
6	Langford	38	21	5	12	91	56	+35	68	
7	Ampthill Town	38	20	8	10	95	61	+34	67 (Note: Ampthill Town were deducted 1 point.)	
8	Leighton Town development	38	20	7	11	76	59	+17	67	
9	Cranfield United	38	18	6	14	77	48	+29	60	
10	Royston Town U23	38	18	6	14	89	64	+25	60	
11	Rothwell Corinthians	38	14	12	12	86	68	+18	54	
12	Long Buckby	38	13	4	21	77	85	−8	43	
13	Buckingham	38	10	12	16	59	80	−21	42	
14	Huntingdon Town	38	10	9	19	57	89	−32	39	
15	Letchworth Garden City Eagles	38	11	6	21	55	81	−26	36 (Note: Letchworth Garden City Eagles were deducted 3 points.)	
16	Eaton Socon	38	9	6	23	44	85	−41	33	
17	Raunds Town	38	7	9	22	46	90	−44	30	
18	Rushden & Higham United	38	7	6	25	51	106	−55	27	
19	Irchester United	38	5	8	25	34	121	−87	23	
20	Burton Park Wanderers	38	5	3	30	47	127	−80	18	Resigned from the league

Source: The FA Full-Time
Rules for classification: 1) points; 2) goal difference; 3) number of goals scored; 4) number of matches won; 5) head-to-head results
Notes:

Reserve and U23 sides are ineligible for promotion to Step 5 or higher.

=== Play-offs ===
Semi-finals
2	Northampton Sileby Rangers	3
5	Moulton	1
3	Winslow United	5
4	Wellingborough Whitworth	1

Final
2	Northampton Sileby Rangers	1
3	Winslow United	3

==== Semifinals ====
30 April 2024	Northampton Sileby Rangers	3–1	Moulton	Northampton
19:45 GMT	Burrows 45', 47'; Arthur 69'	Report	Brooks 88'	Stadium: Fernie Fields; Attendance: 151; Referee: Andy Woolmer

30 April 2024	Winslow United	5–1	Wellingborough Whitworth	Winslow
19:45 GMT	Enver-Marum; Massay; Rowe; Scott	Report	Ansu	Stadium: Elmfields Gate; Attendance: 262; Referee: Jonny Lam

==== Final ====
4 May 2024	Northampton Sileby Rangers	1–3	Winslow United	Northampton
15:00 GMT	Drain 61'	Report	Massay; King	Stadium: Fernie Fields; Attendance: 263; Referee: Matthew Rendell

=== Stadia and locations ===
Locations of Division One clubs
Locations of Division One clubs (Northamptonshire)

Team	Stadium	Capacity
Ampthill Town	Ampthill Park	1,300
Buckingham	Stratford Fields	
Burton Park Wanderers	Latimer Park (groundshare with Kettering Town)	
Cranfield United	Crawley Road	
Eaton Socon	River Road	
Huntingdon Town	Jubilee Park	
Irchester United	Alfred Street	1,800
Langford	Forde Park	2,800
Leighton Town development	Bell Close	2,800
Letchworth Garden City Eagles	Pixmore Pitches	
Long Buckby	Station Road	1,000
Moulton	Brunting Road	
Northampton ON Chenecks	Old Northamptonians Sports Ground	
Northampton Sileby Rangers	Fernie Fields	
Raunds Town	Kiln Park	
Rushden & Higham United	Hayden Road	1,500
Rothwell Corinthians	Desborough Road	
Royston Town U23	Garden Walk	5,000
Wellingborough Whitworth	The Victoria Mill Ground	2,140
Winslow United	Elmfields Gate	2,000

== Division Two ==
Spartan South Midlands Football League Division Two
- Season: 2023–24
- Champions: AFC Welwyn
- Promoted: AFC Welwyn
- Matches: 306
- Goals: 1,134 (3.71 per match)

Division Two featured 14 clubs which competed in the division last season, along with four new clubs:

- AFC Welwyn, new club
- Milton Keynes Irish reserves, joined from the United Counties League reserve division
- Newport Pagnell Town development, joined from the United Counties League reserve division
- Stony Stratford Town, joined from the North Bucks League

=== League table ===
Pos	Team	Pld	W	D	L	GF	GA	GD	Pts	Promotion
1	AFC Welwyn	34	24	5	5	89	31	+58	77	Promoted to Division One
2	Bovingdon F.C.	34	21	6	7	83	46	+37	69	
3	Old Bradwell United	34	19	7	8	74	38	+36	64	
4	Codicote	34	19	6	9	73	43	+30	63	
5	Newport Pagnell Town development	34	17	7	10	70	62	+8	58	
6	Pitstone & Ivinghoe	34	18	2	14	75	55	+20	56	
7	New Bradwell St Peter	34	16	6	12	79	51	+28	54	
8	Aston Clinton	34	15	6	13	64	54	+10	51	
9	Milton Keynes College	34	15	5	14	78	73	+5	50	
10	Totternhoe	34	14	7	13	61	71	−10	49	
11	Stony Stratford Town	34	14	6	14	62	69	−7	48	
12	Milton Keynes Irish reserves	34	12	11	11	62	65	−3	47	
13	Eynesbury United	34	10	7	17	40	55	−15	37	
14	AFC Caddington	34	10	4	20	61	100	−39	34	
15	Sarratt	34	8	5	21	40	84	−44	29	
16	Tring Corinthians AFC	34	5	13	16	39	68	−29	28	
17	Berkhamsted Raiders	34	7	5	22	52	85	−33	26	Resigned from the league
18	The 61	34	5	6	23	32	84	−52	21	

Source: FA Full-Time
Rules for classification: 1) points; 2) goal difference; 3) number of goals scored.

=== Stadia and locations ===
Locations of Division Two clubs
Locations of Division Two clubs (Buckinghamshire)
