= 2021–22 FA Cup qualifying rounds =

Tournament details
- Country: England; Wales; Jersey
- Teams: 637

The 2021–22 FA Cup qualifying rounds opened the 141st edition of the FA Cup, the world's oldest association football single knockout competition, organised by The Football Association, the governing body for the sport in England. The 32 winning teams from the fourth qualifying round progressed to the First round proper; which was played in November.

637 teams were accepted into the qualification, a slight decline on the 644 which had been the fixed number since 2014–15 FA Cup qualifying rounds. This reflected the restructuring of the National League System, and a new policy of capping FA Cup places to match the number of clubs at levels 5-10 (steps 1–6). There were 8 places available for level 10 clubs, which were allocated by a random draw among the strongest teams from each of the 17 level 10 leagues

== Calendar ==
Round	Main date	Leagues entering at this round	New entries this round	Winners from previous round	Number of fixtures	Prize fund	
Round	Main date	Leagues entering at this round	New entries this round	Winners from previous round	Number of fixtures	Losing club	Winning club
Extra preliminary round	7 August 2021	Level 8 (lowest ranked clubs); Level 9 Level 10 (highest ranked clubs)	348	none	174	£375	£1,125
Preliminary round	21 August 2021	Level 8	136	174	155	£481	£1,444
First qualifying round	4 September 2021	Level 7	87	155	121	£750	£2,250
Second qualifying round	18 September 2021	National League North; National League South	43	121	82	£1,125	£3,375
Third qualifying round	2 October 2021	none	0	82	41	£1,875	£5,625
Fourth qualifying round	16 October 2021	National League	23	41	32	£3,125	£9,375

== Extra preliminary round ==
The draw for the extra preliminary round was made on 9 July 2021. This round included nine teams from tier 10, the lowest tier in the competition.

Tie	Home team (Tier)	Score	Away team (Tier)	Att.
Friday 6 August 2021
6	Whickham (9)	2–3	Consett (9)	371
87	West Essex (9)	4–2	St Panteleimon (9)	275
96	New Salamis (9)	1–3	Kensington & Ealing Borough (10)	95
105	Ascot United (9)	3–0	Holyport (9)	450
Saturday 7 August 2021
1	Ashington (9)	3–4	Newcastle Benfield (9)	281
2	Shildon (8)	1–0	Garforth Town (9)	220
3	Redcar Athletic (9)	4–1	Hemsworth Miners Welfare (9)	292
4	Penrith (9)	1–2	Guisborough Town (9)	
5	Whitley Bay (9)	1–1	North Ferriby (10)	359
7	Billingham Town (9)	2–3	West Allotment Celtic (9)	104
8	Seaham Red Star (9)	3–1	Crook Town (9)	123
9	Newton Aycliffe (9)	4–3	Thornaby (9)	183
10	Sunderland Ryhope CA (9)	5–1	Bishop Auckland (9)	134
11	North Shields (9)	3–1	West Auckland Town (9)	277
12	Goole (9)	1–1	Ryhope Colliery Welfare (9)	130
13	Knaresborough Town (9)	2–1	Northallerton Town (9)	190
14	Irlam (9)	3–0	Albion Sports (9)	125
15	Macclesfield (9)	4–0	Burscough (9)	1,334
16	Athersley Recreation (9)	1–4	Campion (10)	101
17	Glossop North End (8)	3–0	Widnes (8)	215
18	Lower Breck (9)	0–0	Penistone Church (9)	165
19	Longridge Town (9)	1–2	Northwich Victoria (9)	182
20	Barnoldswick Town (9)	6–1	Runcorn Town (9)	232
21	Padiham (9)	2–3	AFC Liverpool (9)	192
22	Ashton Athletic (9)	0–2	Squires Gate (9)	52
23	West Didsbury & Chorlton (10)	1–3	Avro (9)	355
24	Prestwich Heys (9)	3–1	Litherland REMYCA (9)	174
25	Vauxhall Motors (9)	0–0	Skelmersdale United (9)	156
26	Thackley (9)	2–3	Wythenshawe Town (9)	157
27	Silsden (9)	0–4	Eccleshill United (9)	192
28	Winsford United (9)	0–2	Charnock Richard (9)	209
30	Tividale (9)	2–0	Shifnal Town (9)	139
31	Sporting Khalsa (8)	4–3	Coventry Sphinx (9)	90
32	Lye Town (9)	2–3	Hanley Town (9)	90
Match played at Cradley Town.
33	Rugby Town (9)	1–0	Boldmere St Michaels (9)	243
35	Highgate United (9)	3–1	Malvern Town (9)	
36	Westfields (9)	3–0	Heather St John's (9)	102
37	Hereford Lads Club (9)	0–0	Haughmond (9)	304
38	Walsall Wood (9)	0–2	Leicester Road (9)	
39	Whitchurch Alport (9)	2–1	Wolverhampton Casuals (9)	158
40	Racing Club Warwick (9)	0–4	Stone Old Alleynians (9)	187
41	Gresley Rovers (9)	3–0	Bewdley Town (9)	229
42	Romulus (9)	1–2	Uttoxeter Town (9)	153
43	AFC Wulfrunians (9)	2–1	Heanor Town (9)	
44	Stourport Swifts (9)	0–4	Lichfield City (9)	132
45	Quorn (9)	5–1	Selston (9)	72
46	Barton Town (9)	2–3	Maltby Main (9)	210
47	Pinchbeck United (9)	0–1	Skegness Town (9)	106
48	GNG Oadby Town (9)	0–2	Stamford (8)	60
49	Sherwood Colliery (9)	1–1	Boston Town (9)	143
50	Newark (9)	0–0	Lutterworth Town (9)	112
51	Bottesford Town (9)	W/O	Eastwood (9)	84
Original score was 1-0, but Eastwood were awarded a walkover after Bottesford Town were removed from the competition for fielding an ineligible player.
52	Anstey Nomads (9)	1–0	Sleaford Town (9)	157
53	Long Eaton United (9)	4–1	Holbeach United (9)	110
54	Winterton Rangers (9)	6–2	Grimsby Borough (9)	117
55	Leicester Nirvana (9)	1–1	Deeping Rangers (9)	78
56	Handsworth (9)	2–0	AFC Mansfield (9)	168
57	Staveley Miners Welfare (9)	1–2	Loughborough University (9)	170
58	Cleethorpes Town (8)	4–0	Melton Town (9)	188
59	Lakenheath (9)	2–2	Mulbarton Wanderers (9)	
60	Swaffham Town (9)	0–3	Walsham-le-Willows (9)	106
61	Mildenhall Town (9)	1–0	Wroxham (9)	
62	Fakenham Town (9)	1–0	Ely City (9)	
63	Cogenhoe United (9)	0–0	Haverhill Rovers (9)	
64	Harborough Town (9)	2–0	Rothwell Corinthians (9)	
65	Newport Pagnell Town (9)	4–1	Peterborough Northern Star (9)	163
66	Corby Town (8)	3–1	Woodbridge Town (9)	
67	Potton United (9)	2–1	Eynesbury Rovers (9)	161
68	Norwich United (9)	2–1	Long Buckby (9)	156
69	Brantham Athletic (9)	4–3	Gorleston (9)	
70	Hadleigh United (9)	2–0	Desborough Town (9)	103
71	Kirkley & Pakefield (9)	1–1	Long Melford (9)	
72	Arlesey Town (9)	4–3	Thetford Town (9)	116
73	Bugbrooke St Michaels (9)	W/O	March Town United (9)	140
Originally score was 4–2, but March Town United were awarded a walkover after Bugbrooke St Michaels were removed from the competition for fielding an ineligible player.
74	Kempston Rovers (8)	1–1	Whitton United (9)	95
75	Godmanchester Rovers (9)	1–1	Northampton ON Chenecks (9)	
76	Wellingborough Town (9)	1–3	Newmarket Town (9)	
77	Harpenden Town (9)	1–1	Romford (8)	
78	Ware (8)	2–1	Takeley (9)	
80	Redbridge (9)	1–2	Ilford (9)	
81	Stanway Rovers (9)	1–0	Leverstock Green (9)	
83	Biggleswade United (9)	0–7	Saffron Walden Town (9)	95
84	Little Oakley (9)	2–0	St Margaretsbury (9)	122
85	Edgware Town (9)	0–3	Hadley (9)	110
88	Witham Town (8)	3–2	Woodford Town (9)	
89	FC Clacton (9)	0–1	Leighton Town (9)	169
90	Enfield (9)	2–1	Milton Keynes Irish (9)	
91	Sawbridgeworth Town (9)	0–3	Cockfosters (9)	
92	Basildon United (8)	4–0	Stansted (9)	
93	Dunstable Town (9)	1–5	North Greenford United (9)	148
94	Southend Manor (9)	1–0	London Colney (9)	
97	Easington Sports (9)	1–1	Wokingham & Emmbrook (9)	136
98	Bishop's Cleeve (9)	6–1	Clevedon Town (9)	96
99	Brislington (9)	3–3	Brimscombe & Thrupp (9)	
100	Shrivenham (9)	1–1	Burnham (9)	
101	Chipping Sodbury Town (9)	1–2	Harefield United (9)	46
102	Risborough Rangers (9)	1–0	Lydney Town (9)	110
103	Aylesbury Vale Dynamos (9)	0–1	Longlevens (9)	123
104	Thornbury Town (9)	0–4	Royal Wootton Bassett Town (9)	204
106	Aylesbury United (8)	2–0	Fairford Town (9)	
108	Broadfields United (9)	4–1	Cribbs (9)	
109	Ardley United (9)	2–0	Ashton & Backwell United (9)	118
110	Oxhey Jets (9)	2–0	Bitton (9)	101
111	Cadbury Heath (9)	0–2	Flackwell Heath (9)	74
112	Tring Athletic (9)	3–0	Keynsham Town (9)	
113	Reading City (9)	3–1	Hallen (9)	

Tie	Home team (Tier)	Score	Away team (Tier)	Att.
114	Roman Glass St George (9)	2–1	Holmer Green (9)	
115	K Sports (9)	3–1	Rusthall (9)	
116	Walton & Hersham (9)	2–1	Tunbridge Wells (9)	
117	Beckenham Town (9)	0–0	Colliers Wood United (9)	
118	AFC Varndeanians (9)	1–2	Farnham Town (9)	
119	Steyning Town (9)	2–2	Pagham (9)	
120	Badshot Lea (9)	3–3	East Preston (9)	129
121	Jersey Bulls (9)	10–1	Horsham YMCA (9)	975
122	Chatham Town (9)	6–2	Eastbourne United (9)	
123	Hollands & Blair (9)	3–0	Holmesdale (9)	147
124	Staines Town (8)	1–2	Little Common (9)	122
125	Cobham (9)	2–2	Sevenoaks Town (8)	
126	CB Hounslow United (9)	0–3	Redhill (9)	
127	Kennington (9)	5–0	Horley Town (9)	171
128	Broadbridge Heath (9)	2–6	Littlehampton Town (9)	165
129	Glebe (9)	2–3	Abbey Rangers (9)	87
130	Deal Town (9)	1–0	Southall (9)	174
131	Eastbourne Town (9)	2–4	Guildford City (9)	266
132	Newhaven (9)	6–1	Camberley Town (9)	94
133	Bexhill United (9)	0–1	Peacehaven & Telscombe (9)	
Match played at Hastings United.
134	Lingfield (9)	2–1	Egham Town (9)	
Match played at Whyteleafe.
136	Ashford Town (8)	2–1	AFC Uckfield Town (9)	
137	Tower Hamlets (9)	1–4	Sheppey United (9)	
138	Hanworth Villa (9)	1–3	Loxwood (9)	
139	Virginia Water (9)	1–1	Athletic Newham (9)	
140	Lordswood (9)	0–0	Knaphill (9)	74
141	East Grinstead Town (8)	1–2	Alfold (9)	
142	Sheerwater (9)	0–2	Erith Town (9)	104
143	Crawley Down Gatwick (9)	3–2	Welling Town (9)	72
144	Tooting & Mitcham United (8)	1–1	Erith & Belvedere (9)	248
145	Fisher (9)	0–1	Raynes Park Vale (9)	158
146	Molesey (9)	0–1	Phoenix Sports (8)	
147	Saltdean United (9)	4–0	Frimley Green (9)	
148	Mile Oak (10)	0–2	Punjab United (9)	97
149	Balham (9)	3–0	Canterbury City (9)	
150	Crowborough Athletic (9)	1–3	AFC Croydon Athletic (9)	113
152	AFC Portchester (9)	4–2	Horndean (9)	
153	Amesbury Town (9)	1–4	Shaftesbury (9)	74
154	Westbury United (9)	4–2	Christchurch (9)	82
155	Hythe & Dibden (9)	1–7	Bradford Town (9)	
156	Blackfield & Langley (9)	5–1	Cowes Sports (9)	68
157	Portland United (9)	2–2	Bournemouth (9)	
158	Calne Town (9)	1–1	Bashley (9)	171
159	Moneyfields (9)	1–3	AFC Stoneham (9)	103
160	Brockenhurst (9)	1–2	Hamworthy United (9)	152
161	United Services Portsmouth (9)	0–3	Alton (9)	80
162	Larkhall Athletic (8)	1–2	Lymington Town (8)	145
163	Bridport (9)	1–2	Fleet Town (9)	175
164	Alresford Town (9)	3–0	Odd Down (10)	
165	Tadley Calleva (9)	0–2	Baffins Milton Rovers (9)	106
166	Shepton Mallet (9)	0–0	Andover New Street (10)	258
167	Hamble Club (9)	2–3	Corsham Town (9)	
168	Fareham Town (9)	8–0	Street (9)	
169	Millbrook (9)	2–2	Saltash United (9)	113
170	Mousehole (9)	3–1	Helston Athletic (9)	
171	Brixham (10)		Bridgwater United (9)	
Original score was 1-2, but due to a refereeing error, the tie was ordered to be replayed.
172	Buckland Athletic (9)	1–2	Exmouth Town (9)	
173	AFC St Austell (10)	2–3	Tavistock (9)	
174	Ilfracombe Town (9)	4–3	Wellington (9)	107
Sunday 8 August 2021
29	Emley (9)	3–2	Congleton Town (9)	323
34	Coventry United (9)	4–1	Worcester City (9)	224
Match played at Daventry Town.
82	Baldock Town (9)	1–0	Wembley (9)	214
95	Hoddesdon Town (9)	0–1	Clapton (9)	124
Match played at Hertford Town.
107	Tuffley Rovers (9)	3–2	Windsor (9)	193
Match played at Windsor.
Tuesday 10 August 2021
86	Walthamstow (9)	4–1	Crawley Green (9)	
135	Hassocks (9)	1–2	Spelthorne Sports (9)	128
151	Banstead Athletic (9)	2–2	Bearsted (9)	
Wednesday 11 August 2021
79	Sporting Bengal United (9)	0–3	White Ensign (9)	
Tuesday 17 August 2021
171	Bridgwater United (9)	2–1	Brixham (10)	223
Replays
Tuesday 10 August 2021
5R	North Ferriby (10)	2–5	Whitley Bay (9)	350
25R	Skelmersdale United (9)	2–0	Vauxhall Motors (9)	181
37R	Haughmond (9)	1–0	Hereford Lads Club (9)	
49R	Boston Town (9)	0–1	Sherwood Colliery (9)	144
50R	Lutterworth Town (9)	1–3	Newark (9)	184
55R	Deeping Rangers (9)	3–1	Leicester Nirvana (9)	147
59R	Mulbarton Wanderers (9)	3–1	Lakenheath (9)	
74R	Whitton United (9)	2–1	Kempston Rovers (8)	
97R	Wokingham & Emmbrook (9)	0–0 (3–4 p)	Easington Sports (9)	
Match played at Easington Sports.
99R	Brimscombe & Thrupp (9)	3–1	Brislington (9)	122
100R	Burnham (9)	4–0	Shrivenham (9)	185
119R	Pagham (9)	2–3	Steyning Town (9)	111
120R	East Preston (9)	0–2	Badshot Lea (9)	145
140R	Knaphill (9)	2–2 (4–3 p)	Lordswood (9)	
157R	Bournemouth (9)	3–1	Portland United (9)	
158R	Bashley (9)	2–1	Calne Town (9)	255
166R	Andover New Street (10)	0–4	Shepton Mallet (9)	187
Wednesday 11 August 2021
12R	Ryhope Colliery Welfare (9)	2–3 (a.e.t.)	Goole (9)	118
18R	Penistone Church (9)	1–2	Lower Breck (9)	302
63R	Haverhill Rovers (9)	0–2	Cogenhoe United (9)	
71R	Long Melford (9)	0–4	Kirkley & Pakefield (9)	
75R	Northampton ON Chenecks (9)	1–0	Godmanchester Rovers (9)	76
77R	Romford (8)	3–1	Harpenden Town (9)	88
117R	Colliers Wood United (9)	1–3	Beckenham Town (9)	
125R	Sevenoaks Town (8)	3–1	Cobham (9)	144
139R	Athletic Newham (9)	3–1	Virginia Water (9)	
144R	Erith & Belvedere (9)	3–1 (a.e.t.)	Tooting & Mitcham United (8)	180
169R	Saltash United (9)	4–6	Millbrook (9)	222
Tuesday 17 August 2021
151R	Bearsted (9)	2–1	Banstead Athletic (9)	146

== Preliminary round ==
The draw for the preliminary round was made on 9 July 2021. This round included Campion and Kensington & Ealing Borough from tier 10, the two lowest ranked teams remaining in the competition.

Tie	Home team (Tier)	Score	Away team (Tier)	Att.
Friday 20 August 2021
8	West Allotment Celtic (9)	4–2	Whitley Bay (9)	410
26	AFC Liverpool (9)	2–3	Bootle (8)	406
92	Wantage Town (8)	1–2	Highworth Town (8)	270
118	Walton & Hersham (9)	2–0	Guildford City (9)	420
Saturday 21 August 2021
48	Sheffield (8)	1–2	Sherwood Colliery (9)	442
109	Newhaven (9)	0–4	Jersey Bulls (9)	157
1	Marske United (8)	7–0	Pickering Town (8)	285
2	Goole (9)	0–1	Pontefract Collieries (8)	236
3	Stockton Town (8)	1–0	Ossett United (8)	476
4	Newcastle Benfield (9)	1–2	Dunston (8)	368
5	Liversedge (8)	5–0	Knaresborough Town (9)	183
6	North Shields (9)	2–0	Guisborough Town (9)	275
7	Shildon (8)	2–1	Brighouse Town (8)	200
9	Consett (9)	2–3	Bridlington Town (8)	302
10	Seaham Red Star (9)	2–2	Redcar Athletic (9)	136
11	Frickley Athletic (8)	0–3	Sunderland Ryhope CA (9)	156
12	Tadcaster Albion (8)	1–2	Newton Aycliffe (9)	166
13	Yorkshire Amateur (8)	0–7	Hebburn Town (8)	119
14	Avro (9)	1–1	Runcorn Linnets (8)	175
15	Prescot Cables (8)	3–2	Campion (10)	309
17	Squires Gate (9)	6–4	Macclesfield (9)	738
18	Glossop North End (8)	0–1	Kendal Town (8)	264
19	Lower Breck (9)	2–2	Mossley (8)	168
20	Eccleshill United (9)	1–1	Charnock Richard (9)	96
21	Wythenshawe Town (9)	1–2	1874 Northwich (8)	202
22	City of Liverpool (8)	2–0	Emley (9)	152
23	Workington (8)	1–1	Marine (8)	601
24	Barnoldswick Town (9)	5–4	Ramsbottom United (8)	353
25	Prestwich Heys (9)	0–3	Warrington Rylands (8)	209
27	Irlam (9)	1–5	Skelmersdale United (9)	162
28	Trafford (8)	2–2	Colne (8)	327
29	Halesowen Town (8)	3–0	Sutton Coldfield Town (8)	551
30	Gresley Rovers (9)	0–2	Leek Town (8)	244
31	Bedworth United (8)	2–1	Kidsgrove Athletic (8)	167
32	Tividale (9)	2–1	AFC Wulfrunians (9)	129
33	Chasetown (8)	7–0	Uttoxeter Town (9)	386
34	Stone Old Alleynians (9)	4–2	Rugby Town (9)	131
35	Sporting Khalsa (8)	3–2	Market Drayton Town (8)	157
36	Westfields (9)	0–1	Coventry United (9)	228
37	Highgate United (9)	1–4	Coleshill Town (8)	92
38	Haughmond (9)	0–5	Hanley Town (9)	68
39	Belper Town (8)	3–1	Whitchurch Alport (9)	337
40	Newcastle Town (8)	0–1	Leicester Road (9)	83
41	Evesham United (8)	2–4	Lichfield City (9)	214
42	Loughborough University (9)	3–2	Newark (9)	170
43	Maltby Main (9)	1–1	Carlton Town (8)	104
44	Cleethorpes Town (8)	3–1	Loughborough Dynamo (8)	244
45	Quorn (9)	1–2	Ilkeston Town (8)	274
46	Handsworth (9)	5–2	Stocksbridge Park Steels (8)	183
47	Worksop Town (8)	4–4	Eastwood (9)	321
49	Winterton Rangers (9)	4–1	Deeping Rangers (9)	96
50	Lincoln United (8)	0–3	Stamford (8)	210
51	Long Eaton United (9)	4–0	Shepshed Dynamo (8)	192
52	Anstey Nomads (9)	2–1	Skegness Town (9)	322
53	Norwich United (9)	1–0	Newmarket Town (9)	138
54	Yaxley (8)	1–1	Mildenhall Town (9)	95
55	Harborough Town (9)	0–3	Biggleswade (8)	188
56	Potton United (9)	5–1	Walsham-le-Willows (9)	132
57	Fakenham Town (9)	0–1	Bury Town (8)	181
58	Cogenhoe United (9)	0–2	Dereham Town (8)	86
60	Kirkley & Pakefield (9)	1–0	Northampton ON Chenecks (9)	109
61	Wisbech Town (8)	2–0	Whitton United (9)	157
62	Bedford Town (8)	3–0	St Neots Town (8)	388
63	Newport Pagnell Town (9)	4–1	Histon (8)	213
64	Brantham Athletic (9)	0–3	Spalding United (8)	86
65	Corby Town (8)	3–3	Soham Town Rangers (8)	377
66	Mulbarton Wanderers (9)	1–0	Hadleigh United (9)	156
67	Daventry Town (8)	1–5	Cambridge City (8)	103
68	Brentwood Town (8)	1–0	Leighton Town (9)	198
69	FC Romania (8)	1–1	Welwyn Garden City (8)	85
70	Coggeshall Town (8)	0–1	Berkhamsted (8)	106
71	Walthamstow (9)	2–0	Hullbridge Sports (8)	248
72	Canvey Island (8)	2–1	Waltham Abbey (8)	249
73	Great Wakering Rovers (8)	3–1	Heybridge Swifts (8)	171
74	Felixstowe & Walton United (8)	5–3	Southend Manor (9)	295
75	Little Oakley (9)	0–0	Hertford Town (8)	160
77	Saffron Walden Town (9)	0–4	Hadley (9)	281
78	Maldon & Tiptree (8)	0–1	Aveley (8)	308
79	Barton Rovers (8)	3–0	West Essex (9)	106
81	Cockfosters (9)	1–2	AFC Sudbury (8)	118
82	Barking (8)		Ilford (9)	91
The original score was 2–3, but for reasons unknown, the tie was ordered to be replayed.
83	Ware (8)	1–0	Hashtag United (8)	380
84	Stowmarket Town (8)	4–0	Witham Town (8)	226
85	Colney Heath (8)	3–0	Harlow Town (8)	119
86	Stanway Rovers (9)	1–1	Enfield (9)	116
87	Clapton (9)	1–3	AFC Dunstable (8)	32
88	Basildon United (8)	1–0	White Ensign (9)	93
89	North Greenford United (9)	0–7	Tilbury (8)	82
90	Marlow (8)	3–0	Slimbridge (8)	208
91	Bishop's Cleeve (9)	2–0	Tring Athletic (9)	126
93	Longlevens (9)	3–2	Chalfont St Peter (8)	96
94	Roman Glass St George (9)	0–2	Cirencester Town (8)	68
96	Northwood (8)	1–1	Burnham (9)	124
97	Tuffley Rovers (9)	2–2	Flackwell Heath (9)	78
Match played at Brimscombe & Thrupp.
98	Royal Wootton Bassett Town (9)	2–2	Ardley United (9)	129
99	Oxhey Jets (9)	1–0	Didcot Town (8)	87
100	Broadfields United (9)	0–0	Reading City (9)	38
101	Harefield United (9)	2–1	Binfield (8)	136
102	Thame United (8)	2–0	Thatcham Town (8)	110
103	North Leigh (8)	1–2	Kidlington (8)	153

Tie	Home team (Tier)	Score	Away team (Tier)	Att.
104	Risborough Rangers (9)	1–1	Ascot United (9)	175
105	Cinderford Town (8)	3–3	Easington Sports (9)	124
106	Lingfield (9)	1–4	Chertsey Town (8)	108
Match played at Whyteleafe.
107	Sheppey United (9)	W/O	Saltdean United (9)	
Sheppey United awarded a walkover due to Saltdean United players testing positive for COVID-19, forcing them to forfeit.
108	Hanwell Town (8)	5–0	Athletic Newham (9)	142
110	Farnham Town (9)	2–3	Spelthorne Sports (9)	93
111	Ashford Town (8)	1–1	Knaphill (9)	169
112	Whyteleafe (8)	W/O	Whitehawk (8)	
Whitehawk awarded a walkover due to Whyteleafe withdrawing from the Isthmian League.
113	South Park (8)	3–3	Three Bridges (8)	116
114	Chipstead (8)	3–0	Faversham Town (8)	76
115	Raynes Park Vale (9)	2–3	VCD Athletic (8)	150
117	Steyning Town (9)	0–0	Sutton Common Rovers (8)	73
119	Abbey Rangers (9)	1–0	Loxwood (9)	230
120	Beckenham Town (9)	0–3	Hastings United (8)	
121	Peacehaven & Telscombe (9)	2–1	Crawley Down Gatwick (9)	123
122	Hythe Town (8)	3–3	Westfield (Surrey) (8)	239
123	Redhill (9)	1–1	Deal Town (9)	
124	Chatham Town (9)	1–1	Ashford United (8)	518
125	Balham (9)	3–0	K Sports (9)	
126	Hollands & Blair (9)	1–2	Ramsgate (8)	152
127	Bedfont Sports (8)	3–1	Herne Bay (8)	103
128	Sevenoaks Town (8)	2–2	Erith Town (9)	115
129	Bearsted (9)	0–3	Burgess Hill Town (8)	110
130	Badshot Lea (9)	2–4	Corinthian (8)	130
131	Sittingbourne (8)	2–2	Littlehampton Town (9)	137
132	Phoenix Sports (8)	7–0	Punjab United (9)	134
133	Kennington (9)	2–0	Little Common (9)	170
134	Lancing (8)	0–4	Haywards Heath Town (8)	181
135	Whitstable Town (8)	5–0	Alfold (9)	283
136	Uxbridge (8)	1–0	Cray Valley Paper Mills (8)	84
137	Bracknell Town (8)	1–0	Bashley (9)	214
Match played at Bashley.
138	Shaftesbury (9)	6–1	AFC Stoneham (9)	
139	Westbury United (9)	0–2	Hamworthy United (9)	75
140	Corsham Town (9)	1–5	Fleet Town (9)	108
141	Winchester City (8)	1–3	Chichester City (8)	195
142	Basingstoke Town (8)	2–1	AFC Totton (8)	483
143	Bradford Town (9)	1–1	Alton (9)	114
144	Blackfield & Langley (9)	1–1	AFC Portchester (9)	115
145	Alresford Town (9)	1–0	Fareham Town (9)	72
146	Lymington Town (8)	2–1	Bournemouth (9)	153
Match played at New Milton Town.
147	Baffins Milton Rovers (9)	2–4	Sholing (8)	181
148	Melksham Town (8)	0–1	Shepton Mallet (9)	199
149	Mangotsfield United (8)	3–0	Tavistock (9)	200
150	Bridgwater United (9)	3–0	Ilfracombe Town (9)	306
151	Willand Rovers (8)	3–3	Millbrook (9)	135
152	Exmouth Town (9)	2–1	Bristol Manor Farm (8)	313
153	Frome Town (8)	3–1	Paulton Rovers (8)	398
154	Bideford (8)	1–3	Barnstaple Town (8)	537
155	Mousehole (9)	1–3	Plymouth Parkway (8)	352
Sunday 22 August 2021
16	Northwich Victoria (9)	1–2	Clitheroe (8)	304
76	Baldock Town (9)	2–1	Grays Athletic (8)	211
80	Kensington & Ealing Borough (10)	0–1	Romford (8)	123
95	Aylesbury United (8)	8–0	Brimscombe & Thrupp (9)	151
116	Erith & Belvedere (9)	0–0	AFC Croydon Athletic (9)	230
Tuesday 24 August 2021
59	Arlesey Town (9)	3–2	March Town United (9)	133
Saturday 4 September 2021
82	Barking (8)	3–2	Ilford (9)	105
Replays
Tuesday 24 August 2021
14R	Runcorn Linnets (8)	4–1 (a.e.t.)	Avro (9)	473
19R	Mossley (8)	2–0	Lower Breck (9)	441
20R	Charnock Richard (9)	5–1	Eccleshill United (9)	204
23R	Marine (8)	2–1 (a.e.t.)	Workington (8)	801
28R	Colne (8)	2–1	Trafford (8)	237
43R	Carlton Town (8)	1–0	Maltby Main (9)	124
54R	Mildenhall Town (9)	1–0 (a.e.t.)	Yaxley (8)	159
65R	Soham Town Rangers (8)	2–4 (a.e.t.)	Corby Town (8)	204
69R	Welywn Garden City (8)	3–2	FC Romania (8)	174
75R	Hertford Town (8)	1–2	Little Oakley (9)	80
96R	Burnham (9)	1–4	Northwood (8)	234
97R	Flackwell Heath (9)	6–0	Tuffley Rovers (9)	139
98R	Ardley United (9)	3–1	Royal Wootton Bassett Town (9)	128
100R	Reading City (9)	1–3	Broadfields United (9)	57
104R	Ascot United (9)	3–2	Risborough Rangers (9)	257
105R	Easington Sports (9)	2–2 (4–2 p)	Cinderford Town (8)	156
111R	Knaphill (9)	1–2 (a.e.t.)	Ashford Town (8)	215
113R	Three Bridges (8)	2–4	South Park (8)	160
116R	AFC Croydon Athletic (9)	2–3	Erith & Belvedere (9)	112
122R	Westfield (Surrey) (8)	1–3	Hythe Town (8)	156
123R	Deal Town (9)	0–1	Redhill (9)	256
124R	Ashford United (8)	1–1 (5–6 p)	Chatham Town (9)	472
143R	Alton (9)	3–0	Bradford Town (9)	316
144R	AFC Portchester (9)	1–3	Blackfield & Langley (9)	292
151R	Millbrook (9)	1–2	Willand Rovers (8)	184
Wednesday 25 August 2021
10R	Redcar Athletic (9)	1–3	Seaham Red Star (9)	260
47R	Eastwood (9)	2–5	Worksop Town (8)	372
86R	Enfield (9)	2–1	Stanway Rovers (9)	211
117R	Sutton Common Rovers (8)	4–0	Steyning Town (9)	84
128R	Erith Town (9)	1–2	Sevenoaks Town (8)	204
131R	Littlehampton Town (9)	4–0	Sittingbourne (8)	220

== First qualifying round ==
The draw for the first qualifying round was made on 23 August 2021, and saw 87 clubs from Level 7 joining the 155 winners from the preliminary round. This round included 63 teams from tier 9, the lowest ranked teams remaining in the competition.

Tie	Home team (Tier)	Score	Away team (Tier)	Att.
Saturday 4 September 2021
90	Jersey Bulls (9)	5–1	VCD Athletic (8)	1,126
1	Squires Gate (9)	1–0	North Shields (9)	199
2	Ashton United (7)	0–1	Hebburn Town (8)	202
3	West Allotment Celtic (9)	2–7	Bamber Bridge (7)	173
4	Bootle (8)	2–2	FC United of Manchester (7)	1,381
5	Radcliffe (7)	2–0	Skelmersdale United (9)	414
6	Runcorn Linnets (8)	2–0	Liversedge (8)	603
7	Barnoldswick Town (9)	0–3	Pontefract Collieries (8)	419
8	Marske United (8)	6–0	Seaham Red Star (9)	375
9	Sunderland Ryhope CA (9)	2–4	Stockton Town (8)	324
10	Atherton Collieries (7)	1–1	Bridlington Town (8)	272
11	Warrington Rylands (8)	0–4	Whitby Town (7)	202
12	Shildon (8)	1–3	South Shields (7)	824
13	Lancaster City (7)	1–0	1874 Northwich (8)	347
14	Scarborough Athletic (7)	0–2	Witton Albion (7)	773
15	Mossley (8)	1–0	Newton Aycliffe (9)	419
16	City Of Liverpool (8)	1–0	Clitheroe (8)	227
17	Kendal Town (8)	0–1	Warrington Town (7)	192
18	Stalybridge Celtic (7)	0–1	Colne (8)	391
19	Charnock Richard (9)	2–3	Prescot Cables (8)	257
20	Dunston (8)	1–2	Marine (8)	361
21	Morpeth Town (7)	6–1	Hyde United (7)	471
22	Sherwood Colliery (9)	2–2	Buxton (7)	408
23	Stamford (8)	2–0	Redditch United (7)	293
24	Worksop Town (8)	3–0	Newport Pagnell Town (9)	481
25	Basford United (7)	1–0	Stourbridge (7)	289
26	Rushall Olympic (7)	2–2	Stafford Rangers (7)	322
27	Leek Town (8)	0–2	Mickleover (7)	211
28	Halesowen Town (8)	2–1	Ilkeston Town (8)	
29	Anstey Nomads (9)	0–1	Stone Old Alleynians (9)	395
30	Nantwich Town (7)	2–0	Grantham Town (7)	459
31	Leicester Road (9)	1–1	Hanley Town (9)	211
32	Bromsgrove Sporting (7)	2–0	Loughborough University (9)	645
33	Sporting Khalsa (8)	2–1	Gainsborough Trinity (7)	217
34	Carlton Town (8)	1–3	Stratford Town (7)	178
35	Matlock Town (7)	0–3	Belper Town (8)	1,052
36	Bedworth United (8)	4–1	Winterton Rangers (9)	212
37	Chasetown (8)	2–1	Barwell (7)	709
38	Hednesford Town (7)	1–1	Cleethorpes Town (8)	606
39	Tamworth (7)	3–1	Alvechurch (7)	597
40	Long Eaton United (9)	2–1	Coleshill Town (8)	264
41	Coalville Town (7)	5–2	AFC Rushden & Diamonds (7)	384
42	Handsworth (9)	2–0	Coventry United (9)	368
44	Tividale (9)	0–1	Spalding United (8)	150
45	Hadley (9)	1–1	Enfield (9)	236
46	Cambridge City (8)	1–3	East Thurrock United (7)	215
47	Enfield Town (7)	2–1	Dereham Town (8)	405
48	Bury Town (8)	1–4	Norwich United (9)	408
49	Wingate & Finchley (7)	1–1	Basildon United (8)	225
50	Potton United (9)	0–1	AFC Sudbury (8)	211
51	Colney Heath (8)	0–4	Ware (8)	209
52	Corby Town (8)	1–0	Hendon (7)	533
53	Felixstowe & Walton United (8)	1–3	Great Wakering Rovers (8)	434
55	Leiston (7)	3–2	Brightlingsea Regent (7)	207
57	Hornchurch (7)	1–1	Barton Rovers (8)	362
58	Biggleswade Town (7)	0–3	Hitchin Town (7)	408
59	Kings Langley (7)	3–2	Romford (8)	286
60	Little Oakley (9)	2–1	Kirkley & Pakefield (9)	241
61	Stowmarket Town (8)	2–1	Potters Bar Town (7)	391
62	Mulbarton Wanderers (9)	2–2	Welwyn Garden City (8)	302
63	Arlesey Town (9)	0–5	Bowers & Pitsea (7)	124
64	Walthamstow (9)	1–0	Berkhamsted (8)	317
66	Peterborough Sports (7)	2–1	Haringey Borough (7)	421
67	Brentwood Town (8)	0–2	Cheshunt (7)	180
68	Needham Market (7)	1–0	St. Ives Town (7)	161
69	Royston Town (7)	1–2	Mildenhall Town (9)	335
70	Bedford Town (8)	0–0	Canvey Island (8)	424
71	Bishop's Stortford (7)	3–0	Lowestoft Town (7)	380
72	Walton Casuals (7)	2–1	Hartley Wintney (7)	185
73	Abbey Rangers (9)	5–0	Chatham Town (9)	233
74	Phoenix Sports (8)	2–1	Chipstead (8)	202
75	Redhill (9)	1–1	Sevenoaks Town (8)	174
76	Whitstable Town (8)	2–2	Leatherhead (7)	425
77	Kennington (9)	0–3	Carshalton Athletic (7)	351
78	Harefield United (9)	0–4	Hastings United (8)	350
79	Haywards Heath Town (8)	1–1	Horsham (7)	370
80	Harrow Borough (7)	4–2	Ramsgate (8)	169

Tie	Home team (Tier)	Score	Away team (Tier)	Att.
82	Margate (7)	2–2	Thame United (8)	457
83	Hythe Town (8)	1–0	Ascot United (9)	285
84	Uxbridge (8)	2–2	Chesham United (7)	181
85	Corinthian (8)	2–3	Folkestone Invicta (7)	205
86	Northwood (8)	2–3	Chichester City (8)	155
88	Fleet Town (9)	0–2	Hanwell Town (8)	339
89	Farnborough (7)	4–0	Peacehaven & Telscombe (9)	407
91	Sheppey United (9)	0–1	Marlow (8)	389
92	Ashford Town (8)	2–1	Tilbury (8)	169
93	Cray Wanderers (7)	1–3	Sutton Common Rovers (8)	187
94	Hayes & Yeading United (7)	4–3	Bognor Regis Town (7)	317
95	Beaconsfield Town (7)	2–2	Walton & Hersham (9)	140
96	Lewes (7)	1–2	Metropolitan Police (7)	528
97	Broadfields United (9)	2–2	South Park (8)	79
98	Oxhey Jets (9)	2–2	Kingstonian (7)	300
99	Worthing (7)	1–1	Corinthian-Casuals (7)	869
100	Burgess Hill Town (8)	2–0	Bracknell Town (8)	317
101	Spelthorne Sports (9)	1–1	Bedfont Sports (8)	226
103	Merthyr Town (7)	0–0	Hamworthy United (9)	416
104	Frome Town (8)	1–0	Mangotsfield United (8)	392
105	Aylesbury United (8)	4–1	Willand Rovers (8)	142
106	Kidlington (8)	2–3	Bishop's Cleeve (9)	125
107	Basingstoke Town (8)	4–1	Bridgwater United (9)	659
108	Highworth Town (8)	1–1	Shaftesbury (9)	172
109	Weston-super-Mare (7)	2–2	Flackwell Heath (9)	418
110	Banbury United (7)	1–0	Ardley United (9)	713
111	Gosport Borough (7)	2–1	Plymouth Parkway (8)	555
112	Shepton Mallet (9)	1–8	Taunton Town (7)	362
113	Barnstaple Town (8)	0–1	Lymington Town (8)	109
114	Poole Town (7)	5–0	Swindon Supermarine (7)	419
115	Dorchester Town (7)	1–3	Yate Town(7)	348
116	Longlevens (9)	2–1	Alresford Town (9)	167
117	Cirencester Town (8)	3–0	Easington Sports (9)	152
118	Blackfield & Langley (9)	0–3	Wimborne Town (7)	186
119	Truro City (7)	3–1	Exmouth Town (9)	226
120	Alton (9)	1–3	Sholing (8)	538
121	Salisbury (7)	0–2	Tiverton Town (7)	399
43	Lichfield City (9)	1–3	Nuneaton Borough (7)	838
Sunday 5 September 2021
102	Erith & Belvedere (9)	0–4	Chertsey Town (8)	151
54	Biggleswade (8)	0–1	AFC Dunstable (8)	164
65	Baldock Town (9)	1–0	Wisbech Town (8)	205
81	Balham (9)	0–2	Merstham (7)	125
87	Littlehampton Town (9)	4–5	Whitehawk (8)	525
Tuesday 7 September 2021
56	Barking (8)	1–1	Aveley (8)	183
Replays
Tuesday 7 September 2021
4R	FC United of Manchester (7)	3–2	Bootle (8)	905
10R	Bridlington Town (8)	1–3	Atherton Collieries (7)	284
22R	Buxton (7)	5–1	Sherwood Colliery (9)	467
26R	Stafford Rangers (7)	0–2	Rushall Olympic (7)	630
31R	Hanley Town (9)	2–1	Leicester Road (9)	262
38R	Cleethorpes Town (8)	2–1	Hednesford Town (7)	404
49R	Basildon United (8)	1–6	Wingate & Finchley (7)	150
57R	Barton Rovers (8)	1–4	Hornchurch (7)	151
70R	Canvey Island (8)	2–3	Bedford Town (8)	363
76R	Leatherhead (7)	1–0	Whitstable Town (8)	298
79R	Horsham (7)	2–0	Haywards Heath Town (8)	441
82R	Thame United (8)	2–4	Margate (7)	237
84R	Chesham United (7)	2–1	Uxbridge (8)	251
95R	Walton & Hersham (9)	2–5	Beaconsfield Town (7)	453
97R	South Park (8)	1–2	Broadfields United (9)	137
99R	Corinthian-Casuals (7)	3–1	Worthing (7)	305
103R	Hamworthy United (9)	2–0	Merthyr Town (7)	198
108R	Shaftesbury (9)	4–2	Highworth Town (8)	267
109R	Flackwell Heath (9)	0–1	Weston-super-Mare (7)	267
62R	Welwyn Garden City (8)	2–1	Mulbarton Wanderers (9)	211
Wednesday 8 September 2021
45R	Enfield (9)	2–3 (a.e.t.)	Hadley (9)	
75R	Sevenoaks Town (8)	3–4	Redhill (9)	183
98R	Kingstonian (7)	8–1	Oxhey Jets (9)	251
101R	Bedfont Sports (8)	2–0	Spelthorne Sports (9)	169
Monday 13 September 2021
56R	Aveley (8)	1–1 (4–5 p)	Barking (8)	271

== Second qualifying round ==
The draw for the second qualifying round was made on 6 September 2021, and saw 43 clubs from Level 6 joining the 121 winners from the first qualifying round. This round included 19 teams from tier 9, the lowest ranked teams remaining in the competition.

Tie	Home team (Tier)	Score	Away team (Tier)	Att.
Saturday 18 September 2021
1	Chorley (6)	2–2	Southport (6)	875
2	York City (6)	3–0	Hebburn Town (8)	1,648
3	Marine (8)	3–0	Warrington Town (7)	1,003
4	Atherton Collieries (7)	3–1	Witton Albion (7)	275
5	Squires Gate (9)	2–3	Pontefract Collieries (8)	122
6	Gateshead (6)	6–2	Bradford (Park Avenue) (6)	502
7	Blyth Spartans (6)	1–1	FC United of Manchester (7)	1,169
8	Colne (8)	0–1	Guiseley (6)	317
9	Darlington (6)	0–0	Chester (6)	1,035
10	Curzon Ashton (6)	4–0	Stockton Town (8)	279
11	AFC Fylde (6)	1–1	Spennymoor Town (6)	750
12	City Of Liverpool (8)	3–0	Farsley Celtic (6)	209
13	Morpeth Town (7)	4–1	Lancaster City (7)	624
14	Mossley (8)	1–2	Radcliffe (7)	736
15	Prescot Cables (8)	0–3	Whitby Town (7)	484
16	Runcorn Linnets (8)	3–1	Bamber Bridge (7)	618
17	Marske United (8)	3–0	South Shields (7)	804
18	Leamington (6)	3–1	Stone Old Alleynians (9)	352
19	Belper Town (8)	0–5	Tamworth (7)	820
20	Bromsgrove Sporting (7)	6–0	Worksop Town (8)	722
21	Brackley Town (6)	4–2	Coalville Town (7)	422
22	Sporting Khalsa (8)	1–3	Kidderminster Harriers (6)	687
23	Buxton (7)	4–0	Rushall Olympic (7)	405
24	Boston United (6)	6–0	Corby Town (8)	1,360
25	Nantwich Town (7)	1–2	Banbury United (7)	440
26	AFC Telford United (6)	1–2	Stamford (8)	450
27	Spalding United (8)	1–1	Kettering Town (6)	562
28	Hanley Town (9)	2–1	Chasetown (8)	317
29	Bedworth United (8)	1–3	Long Eaton United (9)	238
30	Halesowen Town (8)	1–3	Handsworth (9)	858
31	Cleethorpes Town (8)	1–0	Alfreton Town (6)	297
32	Mickleover (7)	1–3	Basford United (7)	299
33	Stratford Town (7)	4–0	Nuneaton Borough (7)	429
34	Braintree Town (6)	1–2	Billericay Town (6)	302
35	Hornchurch (7)	4–1	Walthamstow (9)	432
36	Bishop's Stortford (7)	0–2	Bowers & Pitsea (7)	445
37	Barking (8)	1–3	AFC Dunstable (8)	104
38	Norwich United (9)	3–2	Mildenhall Town (9)	220
39	East Thurrock United (7)	2–2	Needham Market (7)	204
40	AFC Sudbury (8)	0–0	Stowmarket Town (8)	440
41	Wingate & Finchley (7)	3–0	Baldock Town (9)	261
42	Concord Rangers (6)	0–0	St Albans City (6)	343
43	Chelmsford City (6)	2–1	Little Oakley (9)	678
44	Kings Langley (7)	1–1	Leiston (7)	288
45	Ware (8)	2–2	Hemel Hempstead Town (6)	347
46	Bedford Town (8)	1–3	Welwyn Garden City (8)	409
47	Enfield Town (7)	1–1	Hadley (9)	422
48	Hitchin Town (7)	0–3	Cheshunt (7)	497
49	Great Wakering Rovers (8)	3–5	Peterborough Sports (7)	157
50	Ashford Town (8)	2–7	Folkestone Invicta (7)	218
51	Abbey Rangers (9)	0–2	Marlow (8)	286
52	Chertsey Town (8)	1–0	Chesham United (7)	388
53	Carshalton Athletic (7)	1–2	Ebbsfleet United (6)	497

Tie	Home team (Tier)	Score	Away team (Tier)	Att.
54	Chichester City (8)	1–3	Maidstone United (6)	620
55	Phoenix Sports (8)	1–3	Redhill (9)	178
56	Broadfields United (9)	2–3	Hastings United (8)	201
57	Burgess Hill Town (8)	0–4	Dorking Wanderers (6)	432
58	Kingstonian (7)	1–1	Horsham (7)	371
59	Merstham (7)	4–1	Margate (7)	259
60	Hanwell Town (8)	0–2	Eastbourne Borough (6)	305
61	Sutton Common Rovers (8)	2–2	Jersey Bulls (9)	322
62	Beaconsfield Town (7)	3–5	Havant & Waterlooville (6)	325
Match played at Havant & Waterlooville.
63	Slough Town (6)	1–3	Whitehawk (8)	395
64	Dartford (6)	5–1	Hythe Town (8)	816
65	Metropolitan Police (7)	1–1	Farnborough (7)	262
66	Dulwich Hamlet (6)	0–1	Bedfont Sports (8)	1,605
67	Hayes & Yeading United (7)	5–0	Tonbridge Angels (6)	325
68	Walton Casuals (7)	0–3	Hampton & Richmond Borough (6)	658
69	Leatherhead (7)	0–0	Corinthian-Casuals (7)	537
70	Welling United (6)	0–2	Harrow Borough (7)	434
71	Aylesbury United(8)	5–1	Bishop's Cleeve (9)	171
72	Cirencester Town (8)	3–1	Hamworthy United (9)	203
74	Tiverton Town (7)	1–3	Sholing (8)	314
75	Basingstoke Town (8)	3–4	Wimborne Town (7)	540
76	Frome Town (8)	2–1	Oxford City (6)	586
77	Poole Town (7)	1–1	Chippenham Town (6)	508
78	Weston-super-Mare (7)	5–1	Taunton Town (7)	706
79	Shaftesbury (9)	0–1	Bath City (6)	610
80	Hungerford Town (6)	1–0	Truro City (7)	394
81	Yate Town (7)	2–0	Gosport Borough (7)	238
82	Lymington Town (8)	2–2	Hereford (6)	368
Sunday 19 September 2021
73	Longlevens (9)	1–3	Gloucester City (6)	2,320
Match played at Gloucester City.
Replays
Tuesday 21 September 2021
47R	Hadley (9)	1–2	Enfield Town (7)	361
61R	Jersey Bulls (9)	3–2	Sutton Common Rovers (8)	149
Match played at Sutton Common Rovers.
1R	Southport (6)	1–0	Chorley (6)	759
7R	FC United of Manchester (7)	0–2	Blyth Spartans (6)	947
9R	Chester (6)	1–0	Darlington (6)	1,064
11R	Spennymoor Town (6)	1–0	AFC Fylde (6)	1,094
27R	Kettering Town (6)	2–0	Spalding United (8)	582
39R	Needham Market (7)	2–3	East Thurrock United (7)	170
40R	Stowmarket Town (8)	0–1	AFC Sudbury (8)	479
42R	St Albans City (6)	2–0	Concord Rangers (6)	464
44R	Leiston (7)	3–1	Kings Langley (7)	205
45R	Hemel Hempstead Town (6)	0–1	Ware (8)	437
58R	Horsham (7)	1–0	Kingstonian (7)	477
65R	Farnborough (7)	0–1	Metropolitan Police (7)	402
69R	Corinthian-Casuals (7)	3–0	Leatherhead (7)	391
77R	Chippenham Town (6)	1–0	Poole Town (7)	412
82R	Hereford (6)	4–0	Lymington Town (8)	778

== Third qualifying round ==
The draw for the third qualifying round was made on 20 September 2021, and consists of the 82 winners from the second qualifying round. Ties will be played over the weekend of 2 October 2021. This round includes 6 teams from tier 9, the lowest ranked teams remaining in the competition.

Tie	Home team (Tier)	Score	Away team (Tier)	Att.
Saturday 2 October 2021
1	Radcliffe (7)	1–3	Morpeth Town (7)	357
2	Atherton Collieries (7)	0–0	Marine (8)	517
3	Pontefract Collieries (8)	6–0	Handsworth (9)	455
4	Marske United (8)	0–0	Chester (6)	890
5	City of Liverpool (8)	1–6	Buxton (7)	321
6	Curzon Ashton (6)	4–0	Cleethorpes Town (8)	321
7	Runcorn Linnets (8)	2–3	Gateshead (6)	907
8	York City (6)	2–0	Whitby Town (7)	2,238
9	Guiseley (6)	1–0	Blyth Spartans (6)	452
10	Spennymoor Town (6)	0–0	Southport (6)	1,134
11	Ware (8)	1–1	Kidderminster Harriers (6)	539
12	Stamford (8)	2–1	Norwich United (9)	314
13	Boston United (6)	4–0	East Thurrock United (7)	1,272
14	Leamington (6)	3–3	Kettering Town (6)	566
15	Leiston (7)	1–3	Tamworth (7)	225
16	Stratford Town (7)	3–2	Long Eaton United (9)	275
17	AFC Sudbury (8)	1–0	Cheshunt (7)	233
18	Hanley Town (9)	1–1	Brackley Town (6)	517
19	AFC Dunstable (8)	2–3	Peterborough Sports (7)	160
20	Chelmsford City (6)	1–0	Enfield Town (7)	545
21	Bromsgrove Sporting (7)	1–0	Welwyn Garden City (8)	775
22	Basford United (7)	0–1	Banbury United (7)	514
23	Merstham (7)	0–2	Hereford (6)	367
24	Metropolitan Police (7)	0–0	St Albans City (6)	184
25	Hungerford Town (6)	3–2	Cirencester Town (8)	361
26	Maidstone United (6)	0–3	Dartford (6)	2,136
27	Folkestone Invicta (7)	1–0	Gloucester City (6)	669
28	Hayes & Yeading United (7)	3–2	Whitehawk (8)	257

Tie	Home team (Tier)	Score	Away team (Tier)	Att.
29	Bedfont Sports (8)	3–3	Sholing (8)	151
30	Havant & Waterlooville (6)	3–2	Billericay Town (6)	282
31	Chippenham Town (6)	0–1	Hastings United (8)	340
32	Harrow Borough (7)	2–1	Marlow (8)	147
34	Horsham (7)	2–2	Eastbourne Borough (6)	619
35	Hampton & Richmond Borough (6)	3–1	Wimborne Town (7)	394
36	Bowers & Pitsea (7)	2–2	Hornchurch (7)	334
37	Corinthian-Casuals (7)	1–1	Wingate & Finchley (7)	235
38	Yate Town (7)	3–0	Redhill (9)	229
39	Aylesbury United (8)	0–1	Ebbsfleet United (6)	317
40	Dorking Wanderers (6)	1–0	Weston-super-Mare (7)	424
41	Bath City (6)	5–0	Frome Town (8)	1,421
Sunday 3 October 2021
33	Jersey Bulls (9)	0–1	Chertsey Town (8)	1,611
Replays
Tuesday 5 October 2021
2R	Marine (8)	3–2 (a.e.t.)	Atherton Collieries (7)	1,099
4R	Chester (6)	0–4	Marske United (8)	1,138
10R	Southport (6)	3–2	Spennymoor Town (6)	634
11R	Kidderminster Harriers (6)	3–0	Ware (8)	906
14R	Kettering Town (6)	2–0	Leamington (6)	612
18R	Brackley Town (6)	1–0	Hanley Town (9)	403
24R	St Albans City (6)	3–1	Metropolitan Police (7)	545
29R	Sholing (8)	1–2	Bedfont Sports (8)	398
34R	Eastbourne Borough (6)	0–1	Horsham (7)	434
36R	Hornchurch (7)	0–2	Bowers & Pitsea (7)	442
37R	Wingate & Finchley (7)	0–3	Corinthian-Casuals (7)	222

== Fourth qualifying round ==
The draw for the fourth qualifying round was made on 4 October 2021, seeing 23 clubs from Level 5 join the 41 winners from the previous round. The draw included one team from Level 9, Hanley Town, who were eliminated after losing their replay. This left 8 teams from tier 8 as the lowest ranked teams remaining in the competition.

Tie	Home team (Tier)	Score	Away team (Tier)	Att.
Saturday 16 October 2021
1	Marine (8)	1–1	Wrexham (5)	1,941
2	Marske United (8)	0–0	Gateshead (6)	1,320
3	Curzon Ashton (6)	0–4	Chesterfield (5)	1,100
4	Brackley Town (6)	1–1	Guiseley (6)	576
5	Hereford (6)	0–1	Solihull Moors (5)	1,783
6	Pontefract Collieries (8)	0–0	FC Halifax Town (5)	1,429
7	York City (6)	1–1	Morpeth Town (7)	2,258
8	Kettering Town (6)	2–2	Buxton (7)	1,218
9	Boston United (6)	1–1	Stratford Town (7)	1,627
10	King's Lynn Town (5)	2–1	Peterborough Sports (7)	1,013
11	Bromsgrove Sporting (7)	0–5	Grimsby Town (5)	3,218
12	Stockport County (5)	3–0	Stamford (8)	3,022
13	Southport (6)	2–3	Altrincham (5)	1,386
14	Tamworth (7)	0–0	Notts County (5)	1,813
15	Ebbsfleet United (6)	2–0	Hampton & Richmond Borough (6)	1,281
16	Horsham (7)	1–0	Woking (5)	1,927
17	Dorking Wanderers (6)	2–2	Hayes & Yeading United (7)	973
18	Corinthian-Casuals (7)	1–1	St Albans City (6)	573
19	Maidenhead United (5)	3–1	Hastings United (8)	912
20	Bedfont Sports (8)	0–1	Kidderminster Harriers (6)	412
21	Hungerford Town (6)	1–2	Bromley (5)	722
22	Harrow Borough (7)	4–2	Chelmsford City (6)	341
23	Wealdstone (5)	1–2	Dagenham & Redbridge (5)	718
24	AFC Sudbury (8)	3–1	Dartford (6)	820
25	Banbury United (7)	1–0	Bath City (6)	1,535
26	Barnet (5)	0–1	Boreham Wood (5)	1,615
27	Yeovil Town (5)	1–1	Weymouth (5)	3,354

Tie	Home team (Tier)	Score	Away team (Tier)	Att.
28	Eastleigh (5)	3–3	Folkestone Invicta (7)	1,009
29	Bowers & Pitsea (7)	2–1	Aldershot Town (5)	564
30	Dover Athletic (5)	1–1	Yate Town (7)	568
31	Torquay United (5)	2–2	Havant & Waterlooville (6)	1,593
32	Southend United (5)	4–1	Chertsey Town (8)	2,307
Replays
Tuesday 19 October 2021
1R	Wrexham (5)	2–0	Marine (8)	1,192
Match played at Nantwich Town.
2R	Gateshead (6)	3–2	Marske United (8)	1,135
4R	Guiseley (6)	2–1	Brackley Town (6)	434
6R	FC Halifax Town (5)	1–0	Pontefract Collieries (8)	1,713
7R	Morpeth Town (7)	1–3	York City (6)	1,637
8R	Buxton (7)	3–1 (a.e.t.)	Kettering Town (6)	1,017
9R	Stratford Town (7)	3–2	Boston United (6)	1,253
14R	Notts County (5)	4–0	Tamworth (7)	2,594
17R	Hayes & Yeading United (7)	2–2 (4–3 p)	Dorking Wanderers (6)	478
18R	St Albans City (6)	1–1 (4–2 p)	Corinthian-Casuals (7)	1,114
27R	Weymouth (5)	1–1 (1–2 p)	Yeovil Town (5)	2,911
28R	Folkestone Invicta (7)	2–3 (a.e.t.)	Eastleigh (5)	1,237
Wednesday 20 October 2021
31R	Havant & Waterlooville (6)	4–2	Torquay United (5)	1,050
Tuesday 26 October 2021
30R	Yate Town (7)	1–0	Dover Athletic (5)	934

== Broadcasting ==
The qualifying rounds were not covered by the FA Cup's broadcasting contracts held by BBC Sport and ITV, although one game per round was broadcast by the BBC on its media platforms.

Round	Tie	Broadcaster
Preliminary round	Sheffield v Sherwood Colliery	BBC Sport
First qualifying round	Lichfield City v Nuneaton Borough	BBC Sport
Second qualifying round	Sutton Common Rovers v Jersey Bulls	BBC Sport
Third qualifying round	Hanley Town v Brackley Town	BBC Sport
Fourth qualifying round	Bromsgrove Sporting v Grimsby Town	BBC Sport
