= Mahe Khan =

Bangladeshi footballer (born 2007)

Personal information
- Full name: Mohammed Mahe Khan
- Date of birth: 2 November 2007 (age 19)
- Place of birth: Kettering, England
- Height: 1.83 m (6 ft 0 in)
- Position: Forward

Youth career
- 2017–2023: Kettering Town
- 2025–2026: Moulton U18

Senior career*
Years	Team	Apps	(Gls)
2024–2026	Rushden & Higham	64	(15)
2025–2026	→ Moulton (dual-registration)	2	(0)
2026–	Moulton	5	(8)

International career^{‡}
2026–	Bangladesh U20	3	(0)
- * Club domestic league appearances and goals as of 21 November 2026 ‡ National team caps and goals as of 6 September 2026

Mohammed Mahe Khan (Bengali: মোহাম্মদ মাহি খান; born 2 November 2007) is a footballer who plays as a forward for United Counties League Premier Division South club Moulton. Born in England, he plays for the Bangladesh national under-20 team.

== Early career ==
Khan was born and raised in Kettering, England to parents from Sylhet, Bangladesh. He spent seven years in Kettering Town's youth system.

== Club career ==
=== Rushden & Higham ===
Khan began playing senior football with Rushden & Higham in the Spartan South Midlands Football League Division One from 2024–25, scoring 5 league goals in 33 appearances.

During the 2025–26 season, Khan scored 10 goals in 31 league appearances.

=== Moulton ===
Khan joined Moulton's under-18 team during the 2025–26 season. He made appearances for the senior side while continuing to play for Rushden & Higham through dual registration. In May 2026, he appeared as a substitute in Moulton's 2–1 victory over Nuneaton Town in the United Counties League Cup final.

During the 2026–27 season, Khan played for Moulton's senior team. He scored twice in a 4–1 league win over Eynesbury Rovers on 26 September 2026. By October 2026, Khan had scored seven goals in four league appearances for the club.

== International career ==
Khan represented Bangladesh U20 in 2027 AFC U-20 Asian Cup qualification held in Tashkent, Uzbekistan from 31 August to 6 September 2026.

In October 2026, Khan's inclusion in the Bangladesh national team squad for the 2026 SAFF Championship was announced by coach Thomas Dooley.

== Career statistics ==
=== Club ===
As of 21 November 2026

Appearances and goals by club, season and competition
Club	Season	League			Domestic		Continental		Other		Total	
Club	Season	Division	Apps	Goals	Apps	Goals	Apps	Goals	Apps	Goals	Apps	Goals
Rushden & Higham	2024–25	SSMLD1	33	5	5	0	0	0	0	0	38	5
Rushden & Higham	2025–26	SSMLD1	31	10	8	2	0	0	0	0	39	12
Rushden & Higham	Total		64	15	13	2	0	0	0	0	77	17
Moulton (dual-registration)	2025–26	UCLPD1	2	0	1	0	0	0	0	0	3	0
Moulton	2026–27	UCLPD1	5	8	3	1	0	0	0	0	8	9
Career total			71	23	17	3	0	0	0	0	88	26
