= 2024–25 Spartan South Midlands Football League =

The 2024–25 season is the 28th in the history of the Spartan South Midlands Football League, a football competition in England. The league operates three divisions, the Premier Division, at Step 5, Division One at Step 6, and Division Two at Step 7 of the English football league system.

The constitution was announced on 17 May 2024.

== Premier Division ==
Spartan South Midlands Football League Premier Division
- Season: 2024–25
- Top goalscorer: Danny Webb (Harpenden Town) (23 goals)
- Biggest home win: Milton Keynes Irish 8–0 Harpenden Town (7 September 2024)
- Biggest away win: Shefford Town & Campton 0–6 Colney Heath (26 October 2024)
- Highest scoring: Biggleswade United 5–5 FC Romania (5 October 2024); Crawley Green 7–3 Wormley Rovers (1 April 2025)
- All statistics correct as of 17 April 2025.

The Premier Division featured 15 clubs which competed in the division last season, along with three new clubs:

- Kempston Rovers, relegated from the Southern League Division One Central
- Winslow United, promoted from Division One
- Wormley Rovers, promoted from the Eastern Counties League Division One South

=== League table ===
Pos	Team	Pld	W	D	L	GF	GA	GD	Pts	Promotion, qualification or relegation
1	Milton Keynes Irish (C, P)	34	26	7	1	101	31	+70	85	Promotion to the Southern League
2	Tring Athletic	34	22	8	4	72	36	+36	74	Qualification for the play-offs
3	Cockfosters	34	19	8	7	58	33	+25	65	Qualification for the play-offs
4	London Lions (O, P)	34	19	5	10	61	33	+28	62	Qualification for the play-offs
5	Wormley Rovers	34	18	7	9	65	50	+15	61	Qualification for the play-offs
6	Arlesey Town	34	17	7	10	57	44	+13	58	
7	Harpenden Town	34	15	6	13	74	65	+9	51	
8	Biggleswade United	34	14	8	12	62	53	+9	50	
9	Potton United	34	13	6	15	57	55	+2	45	
10	Winslow United	34	12	8	14	56	58	−2	44	
11	Dunstable Town	34	11	11	12	37	49	−12	44	
12	Aylesbury Vale Dynamos	34	11	5	18	48	55	−7	38	
13	Colney Heath	34	9	8	17	41	48	−7	35	
14	Baldock Town	34	9	6	19	42	67	−25	33	
15	Crawley Green	34	8	7	19	53	85	−32	31	
16	Kempston Rovers	34	7	7	20	31	70	−39	28	
17	Shefford Town & Campton (R)	34	7	5	22	42	91	−49	26	Relegation to Division One
18	FC Romania (R)	34	6	7	21	38	72	−34	25	Relegation to the Eastern Counties League

Source: The FA Full-Time
Rules for classification: 1) points; 2) goal difference; 3) number of goals scored; 4) number of matches won; 5) head-to-head results
(C) Champions; (O) Play-off winners; (P) Promoted; (R) Relegated

=== Play-offs ===
Semi-finals
2	Tring Athletic	1
5	Wormley Rovers	2
3	Cockfosters	3(2)
4	London Lions	3(4)

Final
5	Wormley Rovers	1(3)
4	London Lions	1(4)

==== Semifinals ====
30 April 2025	Tring Athletic	1–2	Wormley Rovers	Tring
19:45 GMT	Turner 90+5'	Report	Kehinde (pen.); 80'	Stadium: Grass Roots Stadium; Attendance: 509; Referee: Luke Griggs

30 April 2025	Cockfosters	3–3 (2–4 p)	London Lions	Cockfosters
19:45 GMT	Da Cruz 6'; Rookard 57'; Ugbomah 90+9'	Report	Perkins 38'; Lipman 62' (pen.); Kyte 86'	Stadium: Chalk Lane; Referee: Nathan Currey

==== Final ====
5 May 2025	London Lions	1–1 (4–3 p)	Wormley Rovers	Arkley
15:00 GMT	Davis 12'	Report	Asiedu	Stadium: Rowley Lane; Attendance: 406; Referee: Rikki Woolford

=== Results table ===
Home \ Away	ARL	AVD	BAL	BGU	COC	COL	CRA	DUN	ROM	HPT	KEM	LOL	MKI	POT	STC	TRI	WIN	WOR
Arlesey Town	—	3–0	1–2	1–1	1–1	1–6	2–1	0–0	0–3	1–0	3–1	3–1	1–4	2–0	3–1	1–1	1–1	0–1
Aylesbury Vale Dynamos	0–5	—	0–3	0–0	2–2	2–0	2–3	5–0	2–0	4–2	0–1	0–2	0–1	2–3	0–1	0–3	0–2	2–1
Baldock Town	1–2	1–0	—	1–3	1–2	3–0	2–2	0–1	1–6	0–5	0–1	0–0	1–3	1–1	4–0	0–3	1–2	1–3
Biggleswade United	0–0	3–1	2–1	—	2–0	2–0	3–1	0–2	5–5	1–2	5–0	0–1	1–1	1–2	4–1	1–1	3–1	1–2
Cockfosters	0–2	2–1	2–0	3–0	—	1–0	2–0	3–0	4–0	1–0	0–2	1–0	2–2	2–2	4–0	4–0	1–0	2–4
Colney Heath	0–2	0–3	1–1	2–2	2–2	—	0–1	0–2	2–0	3–0	1–0	1–0	0–2	2–3	2–2	1–2	2–2	1–2
Crawley Green	3–4	3–2	2–0	1–6	2–3	1–1	—		1–4	3–4	3–2	0–1	0–2	1–6	1–2	1–4	1–3	7–3
Dunstable Town	1–2	1–1	0–1	2–1	1–1	1–2	0–0	—	1–0	1–3	0–0	2–1	0–2	0–0	2–2	1–1	2–0	1–2
FC Romania	1–6	0–2	1–3	0–1	1–4	0–0	0–1	0–2	—	1–0	1–1	0–4	0–3	1–1	2–0	0–1	4–0	2–5
Harpenden Town	0–1	1–4	5–3	5–4	0–1	1–1	7–1	1–1	4–0	—	5–0	2–1	3–3	4–5	5–1	0–4	3–2	0–0
Kempston Rovers	1–0	2–3	0–2	2–2	0–0	0–2	1–1	2–3	2–2	1–0	—	0–2	0–4	1–0	1–2	1–3	1–2	1–1
London Lions	2–0	0–0	6–1	3–0	1–0	2–1	3–0	4–1	5–1	1–1	5–1	—	1–2	2–0	4–2	0–1	1–1	1–0
Milton Keynes Irish	5–2	2–1	5–1	6–2	3–1	2–0	4–3	6–0	1–1	8–0	3–0	1–1	—	3–1	3–0	3–0	2–2	3–0
Potton United	0–3	1–2	3–2	0–1	0–2	0–2	1–3	1–2	1–0	4–2	3–1	1–2	0–3	—	3–0	0–0	0–1	4–1
Shefford Town & Campton	2–1	2–1	1–3	1–3	2–4	0–6	1–1	2–2	1–1	2–3	2–1	0–2	2–4	0–3	—	1–4	5–2	0–2
Tring Athletic	0–0	2–2	3–0	1–0	2–0	1–0	2–2	2–0	2–0	1–4	2–0	2–1	4–2	3–1	5–2	—	2–0	1–2
Winslow United	1–2	0–3	0–0	1–2	0–0	4–0	4–2	2–0	4–0	1–2	1–2	6–0	0–0	2–6	4–2	3–3	—	2–1
Wormley Rovers	3–1	3–1	1–1	3–0	0–1	1–0	1–1	2–2	2–1	0–0	7–2	2–1	1–3	1–1	1–0	3–6	4–0	—

Source: FA Full-Time Grid
Legend: Blue = home team win; Yellow = draw; Red = away team win.
For upcoming matches, an "a" indicates there is an article about the rivalry between the two participants.

=== Stadia and locations ===
Locations of the Premier Division clubs
Locations of the Premier Division clubs (Bedfordshire)
Locations of the Premier Division clubs
Locations of the Premier Division clubs

Team	Stadium	Capacity
Arlesey Town	Hitchin Road	2,920
Baldock Town	Hitchin Road	2,920
Aylesbury Vale Dynamos	Haywood Way	
Biggleswade United	Fairfield Road	2,000
Cockfosters	Chalk Lane	1,000
Colney Heath	Recreation Ground	
Crawley Green	The Brache	4,000
Dunstable Town	Creasey Park	3,065
FC Romania	Theobalds Lane (groundshare with Cheshunt)	3,000
Harpenden Town	Rothamsted Park	
Kempston Rovers	Hillgrounds Leisure	2,000
London Lions	Rowley Lane	
Milton Keynes Irish	Manor Fields	1,500
Potton United	The Hollow	
Shefford Town & Campton	Shefford Sports Club	1,000
Tring Athletic	Grass Roots Stadium	
Winslow United	Elmfields Gate	2,000
Wormley Rovers	Wormley Playing Fields	500

== Division One ==
Spartan South Midlands Football League Division One
- Season: 2024–25
- Top goalscorer: Nathanael Ansu (Moulton) (29 goals)
- Biggest home win: AFC Welwyn 11–0 Huntingdon Town (15 February 2025)
- Biggest away win: Huntingdon Town 1–8 Desborough Town (10 December 2024)
- Highest scoring: AFC Welwyn 11–0 Huntingdon Town (15 February 2025); AFC Welwyn 10–1 Rushden & Higham United (25 March 2025)
- All statistics correct as of 17 April 2025.

Division One featured sixteen clubs which competed in the division last season, along with four new clubs:

- AFC Welwyn, promoted from Division Two
- Desborough Town, relegated from the United Counties League Premier Division South
- London Colney, transferred from the Combined Counties League Division One
- Stotfold reserves, promoted from the Bedfordshire County League Premier Division

=== League table ===
Pos	Team	Pld	W	D	L	GF	GA	GD	Pts	Promotion, qualification or relegation
1	AFC Welwyn (C, P)	38	30	6	2	105	26	+79	96	Promotion to the Premier Division
2	Desborough Town	38	28	5	5	119	39	+80	89	Qualification for the play-offs
3	Moulton (O, P)	38	25	6	7	95	50	+45	81	Qualification for the play-offs, then promotion to the United Counties League
4	Irchester United	38	23	7	8	96	52	+44	76	Qualification for the play-offs
5	Eaton Socon	38	24	4	10	79	55	+24	76	Qualification for the play-offs
6	Wellingborough Whitworth	38	23	4	11	89	57	+32	73	
7	Ampthill Town	38	18	12	8	50	39	+11	66	
8	Cranfield United	38	17	8	13	64	44	+20	59	
9	Stotfold reserves	38	17	6	15	78	75	+3	57	
10	Rothwell Corinthians	38	16	6	16	63	62	+1	54	
11	Buckingham	38	15	7	16	54	53	+1	52	
12	Letchworth Garden City Eagles	38	14	7	17	66	74	−8	49	
13	Leighton Town reserves	38	11	8	19	53	62	−9	41	
14	Royston Town reserves	38	10	9	19	47	68	−21	39	
15	Long Buckby	38	10	7	21	62	70	−8	37	
16	Langford	38	9	9	20	56	83	−27	36	
17	Rushden & Higham United	38	10	3	25	47	99	−52	33	
18	London Colney	38	5	8	25	32	91	−59	23	Reprieved from relegation
19	Huntingdon Town	38	7	1	30	36	123	−87	22	Reprieved from relegation
20	Raunds Town (R)	38	5	3	30	37	106	−69	18	Relegation to a feeder league

Source: The FA Full-Time
Rules for classification: 1) points; 2) goal difference; 3) number of goals scored; 4) number of matches won; 5) head-to-head results
(C) Champions; (O) Play-off winners; (P) Promoted; (R) Relegated

Reserve and U23 sides are ineligible for promotion to Step 5 or higher.

=== Play-offs ===
Semi-finals
2	Desborough Town	0 (4)
5	Eaton Socon	0 (5)
3	Moulton	3
4	Irchester United	2

Final
5	Eaton Socon	0
3	Moulton	1

==== Semifinals ====
29 April 2025	Desborough Town	0–0 (4–5 p)	Eaton Socon	Desborough
19:45 GMT		Report		Stadium: The R-Inn Stadium; Attendance: 172; Referee: Kovilen Sawmynaden

29 April 2025	Moulton	3–2	Irchester United	Moulton
19:45 GMT	Ansu; Isom; Burrows	Report	Fisher 64'; Bivens 88'	Stadium: Brunting Road; Referee: Ben Twitchings

==== Final ====
3 May 2025	Moulton	1–0	Eaton Socon	Moulton
15:00 GMT	Long	Report		Stadium: Brunting Road; Attendance: 254; Referee: Darren Lander

=== Results table ===
Home \ Away	WLW	AMP	BUC	CRA	DES	EAT	HUN	IRC	LAN	LEI	LET	LOC	LON	MOU	RAU	ROT	ROY	R&H	STO	WEL
AFC Welwyn	—	0–0	2–1	1–3	5–0	2–0	11–0	0–0	1–0	2–1	2–1	3–0	H/W	4–0	5–0	4–1	2–0	10–1	3–2	2–0
Ampthill Town	1–1	—	3–1	0–2	2–1	0–1	1–0	0–1	2–2	3–2	0–0	1–0	2–1	1–1	2–1	2–1	2–1	5–1	1–0	1–1
Buckingham	1–1	0–2	—	0–1	0–4	0–0	4–0	1–2	5–1	1–0	3–0	2–0	2–1	0–2	2–1	1–1	2–0	3–0	2–2	1–2
Cranfield United	1–2	0–1	0–2	—	1–1	1–1	1–2	3–0	1–1	2–1	1–2	5–1	0–2	0–1	5–0	2–1	4–1	2–0	0–1	3–0
Desborough Town	0–1	2–1	2–0	2–2	—	2–3	7–1	3–3	4–2	5–1	2–0	4–1	4–0	1–1	7–0	4–0	5–2	6–1	3–2	2–0
Eaton Socon	1–0	1–1	1–0	2–0	0–3	—	6–1	2–7	4–2	1–0	4–1	1–0	4–1	3–2	1–0	3–1	4–0	4–0	3–1	1–4
Huntingdon Town	0–5	1–2	0–2	1–4	1–8	0–2	—	1–3	1–1	0–3	3–4	2–1	H/W	0–1	3–1	0–2	0–1	1–2	1–2	0–6
Irchester United	0–0	4–2	5–1	2–0	1–3	2–2	5–1	—	2–1	4–1	2–0	5–3	2–1	2–4	3–1	1–0	5–0	4–2	1–1	2–3
Langford	0–3	1–1	1–0	2–2	0–2	3–2	1–2	0–4	—	4–1	3–4	0–1	2–3	4–2	3–1	2–3	0–0	2–0	2–0	1–5
Leighton Town reserves	2–2	0–0	0–1	1–1	0–3	2–0	2–1	0–0	2–0	—	5–3	1–0	3–1	1–1	3–0	1–2	1–2	3–1	2–3	1–3
Letchworth Garden City Eagles	0–4	1–0	1–3	0–0	2–4	4–2	2–0	2–4	1–1	2–1	—	3–0	2–3	2–2	4–1	3–1	0–0	4–1	3–0	2–3
London Colney	1–3	1–1	0–0	0–3	1–6	0–3	3–2	2–4	1–4	2–1	1–1	—	H/W	0–1	3–1	0–3	0–0	0–2	0–3	2–2
Long Buckby	1–2	A/W	2–2	1–4	2–3	1–2	3–5	1–1	4–4	0–0	3–1	2–1	—	1–1	5–1	4–4	0–4	0–0	6–3	1–3
Moulton	2–3	4–0	4–1	3–1	0–0	3–2	6–0	2–1	6–1	5–2	2–1	4–0	H/W	—	6–2	2–1	2–1	4–0	5–4	3–1
Raunds Town	0–1	1–4	0–4	3–1	0–5	1–2	5–0	0–4	0–0	0–2	0–2	1–1	2–0	2–4	—	0–2	1–2	1–2	3–3	2–5
Rothwell Corinthians	1–2	0–1	2–2	1–3	0–4	4–3	0–1	0–2	4–1	1–1	2–1	1–0	3–2	2–1	5–0	—	2–0	3–1	1–2	1–1
Royston Town reserves	2–6	1–1	2–0	0–0	1–2	1–2	3–0	3–1	3–1	1–1	2–2	6–0	0–3	0–4	1–2	1–2	—	0–4	4–3	1–1
Rushden & Higham United	1–3	3–1	2–3	0–2	0–1	1–3	4–2	0–5	1–2	2–0	4–3	2–2	2–1	0–1	0–1	1–3	1–1	—	2–1	1–2
Stotfold reserves	0–1	1–1	2–1	1–2	1–4	3–1	5–0	4–1	2–1	0–5	4–0	3–3	1–4	2–1	2–1	2–2	1–0	5–1	—	2–1
Wellingborough Whitworth	2–6	0–2	4–0	4–1	1–0	1–2	4–3	2–1	3–0	3–0	1–2	5–1	0–2	4–2	2–1	1–0	1–0	5–1	3–4	—

Source: FA Full-Time Grid
Legend: Blue = home team win; Yellow = draw; Red = away team win.
For upcoming matches, an "a" indicates there is an article about the rivalry between the two participants.

=== Stadia and locations ===
Locations of Division One clubs
Locations of Division One clubs (Northamptonshire)

Team	Stadium	Capacity
AFC Welwyn	Herns Way	3,000
Ampthill Town	Ampthill Park	1,300
Buckingham	Stratford Fields	
Cranfield United	Crawley Road	
Desborough Town	Waterworks Field	1,000
Eaton Socon	River Road	
Huntingdon Town	Jubilee Park	
Irchester United	Alfred Street	1,800
Langford	Forde Park	2,800
Leighton Town reserves	Bell Close	2,800
Letchworth Garden City Eagles	Pixmore Pitches	
London Colney	Cotlandswick Park	1,000
Long Buckby	Station Road	1,000
Moulton	Brunting Road	
Raunds Town	Kiln Park	
Rushden & Higham United	Hayden Road	1,500
Rothwell Corinthians	Desborough Road	
Royston Town reserves	Garden Walk	5,000
Stotfold reserves	The JSJ Stadium	1,500
Wellingborough Whitworth	The Victoria Mill Ground	2,140

== Division Two ==
Spartan South Midlands Football League Division Two
- Season: 2024–25
- Champions: New Bradwell St Peter
- Promoted: New Bradwell St Peter
- Matches: 272
- Goals: 969 (3.56 per match)
- Top goalscorer: Luke Burrows (New Bradwell St Peter) (35 goals)

This division comprises 17 teams, one less than the previous season.

2 clubs left the division:

- AFC Welwyn - promoted to Division One.
- Berkhamsted Raiders - resigned from the league, changed name to Berkhamsted U23 and transferred to Suburban Football League

1 club joined the division:

- Padbury Village - promoted from North Bucks & District Football League Premier Division.

=== League table ===
Pos	Team	Pld	W	D	L	GF	GA	GD	Pts	Promotion, qualification or relegation
1	New Bradwell St Peter (C, P)	32	22	7	3	89	30	+59	73	Promotion to Division One
2	Eynesbury United	32	18	8	6	61	33	+28	62	
3	Totternhoe	32	18	6	8	73	38	+35	60	
4	Milton Keynes College	32	16	3	13	69	56	+13	51	
5	Pitstone & Ivinghoe United	32	15	6	11	62	49	+13	51	
6	Bovingdon	32	16	3	13	61	61	0	51	
7	Old Bradwell United	32	15	5	12	57	38	+19	50	
8	Tring Corinthians	32	14	6	12	63	46	+17	48	
9	Newport Pagnell Town Development	32	12	10	10	56	43	+13	46	
10	Stony Stratford Town	32	14	4	14	75	63	+12	46	
11	Aston Clinton	32	9	14	9	44	41	+3	41	
12	Caddington	32	10	8	14	47	54	−7	41 (Note: Caddington were awarded 3 points.)	
13	Codicote	32	12	5	15	48	57	−9	41	
14	Sarratt	32	10	5	17	52	58	−6	35	
15	Milton Keynes Irish Reserves	32	9	6	17	55	67	−12	30 (Note: Milton Keynes Irish Reserves were deducted 3 points.)	
16	Padbury Village	32	8	5	19	40	85	−45	29	
17	The 61 (Luton)	32	2	3	27	17	150	−133	9	

Source: The FA Full-Time
Rules for classification: 1) points; 2) goal difference; 3) number of goals scored; 4) number of matches won; 5) head-to-head results
(C) Champions; (P) Promoted

=== Stadia and locations ===
Locations of Division Two clubs
Locations of Division Two clubs (Buckinghamshire)

Team	Stadium	Capacity
Aston Clinton	London Road	1,000
Bovingdon	Green Lane	1,000
Caddington	Caddington Recreation Club	1,000
Codicote	John Clements Memorial Ground	1,000
Eynesbury United	The Alfred Hall Memorial Ground (Groundshare with Eynesbury Rovers)	1,000
Milton Keynes College	Sport Central MK	
Milton Keynes Irish Reserves	Manor Fields	1,000
New Bradwell St Peter	Recreation Ground	1,000
Newport Pagnell Town Development	Willen Road	500
Old Bradwell United	Abbey Road	500
Padbury Village	Springfields Playing Field	
Pitstone & Ivinghoe United	Pitstone Pavilion & Sports Hall	1,500
Sarratt	King Georges Field	1,000
Stony Stratford Town	Ostlers Lane	1,000
The 61 (Luton)	Kingsway Ground	1,500
Totternhoe	Totternhoe Recreation Ground	500
Tring Corinthians	Icknield Way	500
