= Leverstock Green F.C. =

Association football club in England

Coordinates: 51°45′0″N 0°25′34″W

Leverstock Green
- Full name: Leverstock Green Football Club
- Nicknames: The Green, The Trees
- Founded: 1895
- Ground: Pancake Lane, Leverstock Green
- Chairman: Emma Smart
- Manager: Fergus Moore
- League: Southern League Division One Central
- 2025–26: Southern League Division One Central, 12th of 22
Home colours

Leverstock Green Football Club is a football club based in the Leverstock Green suburb of Hemel Hempstead, Hertfordshire, England. They are currently members of the Southern League Division One Central and play at Pancake Lane.

== History ==
The club was established around 1895. They joined Division Three of the West Herts League in 1908. In 1954 the club moved up to Division Two of the Hertfordshire Senior County League. They were runners-up in their first season in the division and were, earning promotion to Division One B, which became Division One the following season. The club were relegated to Division Two at the end of the 1966–67 season, but were promoted back to Division One in 1973–74 after finishing second in Division Two.

Leverstock Green were Division One champions in 1978–79, earning promotion to the Premier Division. Although they were relegated to Division One in 1983–84, the following season saw them finish as runners-up in Division One, securing an immediate promotion back to the Premier Division. The club were relegated again in 1986–87, but were promoted back to the Premier Division at the end of the 1988–89 season having finished as runners-up in Division One. They were Premier Division runners-up in 1990–91, after which the club moved up to the Premier Division of the South Midlands League.

In 1993 Leverstock Green were demoted to the Senior Division of the South Midlands League as their ground did not have floodlights. They went on to finish as runners-up in 1995–96 and then won the division in 1996–97. At the end of the season the league then merged with the Spartan League to form the Spartan South Midlands League, with Leverstock Green placed in the Senior Division. The division was renamed Division One in 2001, and the club were promoted to the Premier Division at the end of the 2002–03 season after a fourth-place finish.

The 2023–24 season saw Leverstock Green finish fourth in the Premier Division, qualifying for the promotion play-offs. After beating Harpenden Town 3–1 in the semi-finals, they defeated FC Romania 3–0 in the final to earn promotion to Division One Central of the Southern League.

== Ground ==
The club initially played near the village green or in a field now part of the Horseshoe road, with the nearby Rose & Crown pub used as changing rooms. They later moved to the Pancake Lane ground, which was part of the Gorhambury Estate owned by John Grimston. When Grimston died, the land on which the ground is located was transferred to the Crown, although it is managed by the Commission for New Towns. Floodlights were installed in 1999 after several years of opposition from the local council. New changing rooms were built in 2007 and a 113-seat stand was installed during the 2009–10 season.

== Honours ==
- South Midlands League
  - Senior Division champions 1996–97
- Hertfordshire Senior County League
  - Division One champions 1978–79
- Herts Charity Shield
  - Winners 2006–07, 2010–11

== Records ==
- Best FA Cup performance: Second qualifying round, 2014–15, 2018–19
- Best FA Trophy performance: Second qualifying round, 2024–25
- Best FA Vase performance: Fifth round, 2010–11

== See also ==
- Leverstock Green F.C. players
