= AFC Welwyn =

- Nickname: The Romans
- Founded: 2023
- Ground: Hertingfordbury Park, Hertford
- Owner: Tawhid Juneja
- Chairman: Dave Wickham
- Manager: Myles Anderson
- League: Spartan South Midlands League Premier Division
- 2025-26: Spartan South Midlands League Premier Division, 12th of 20
- Website: https://afcwelwyn.co.uk/
Home colours	Away colours

AFC Welwyn is a football club from Welwyn, Hertfordshire, England. They are currently members of the Spartan South Midlands League Premier Division (step 5), for the 2026/27 season, and are playing at the Hertingfordbury Park ground in Hertford Town.

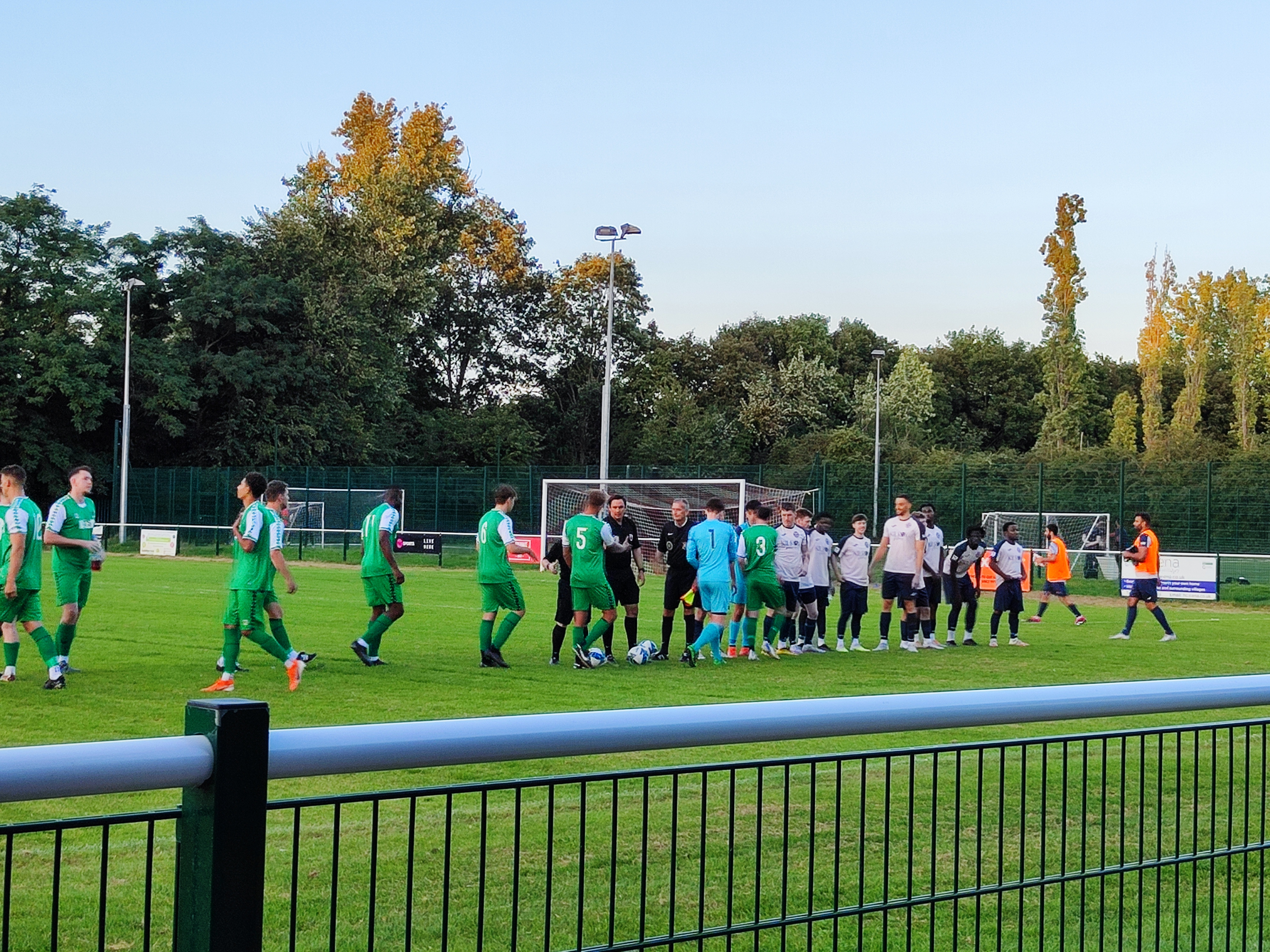
AFC Welwyn Team

== History ==
The club was established in 2023, by Tawhid Juneja and Richard James, after rebranding from the Welwyn Garden City FC Development team. They joined the Spartan South Midlands League in Division Two, at step 7 (level 11), for their inaugural season. For their first two seasons, the club played at the Herns Way ground which it shared with Welwyn Garden City F.C.

They won their first competitive game in the league 8–1, at home, against Milton Keynes Irish Reserves on 5 August 2023.

Their first ever cup competition was in the Herts Senior Centenary Trophy, where they were beaten 3–2 on penalties by Cuffley Seniors after a 2–2 draw on 30 September 2023. Their first FA Cup match was against Ware FC on 2 August 2025.

In their first season (2023–24), the club won the division, gaining promotion to league one. They were also successful at winning the league cup. In their second season (2024–25), they achieved back-to-back promotions by winning the Spartan South Midlands Division One.

In October 2025, the AFC Welwyn football club became a fan owned club.

AFC Welwyn are also known as "The Romans", chosen because of the nearby Welwyn Roman Baths, situated in Welwyn Village. This theme was also incorporated into the team logo and badge. The club motto is "Sic Parvis Magna", which translates into English as "Greatness from Small Beginnings".

== Ground ==
After winning promotion to the Spartan South Premier Division, the club relocated to the Lantern Stadium, which it shared with Potters Bar Town football club. However, in November 2025, the club temporarily played home matches at Hemel Hempstead Town football club. Before announcing a ground share with Hertford Town football club for the 2026/27 season.

Location: Hertingfordbury Park Ground, Horns Road, Hertford, Hertfordshire, SG13 8EZ

== Honours ==
- Spartan South Midlands League
  - Division One champions 2024–25
  - Division Two champions 2023–24
  - Division Two Cup winners 2023–24

== Records ==
- Best FA Cup performance: Extra Preliminary Round, 2025–26, 2026–27.
- Best FA Vase performance: Second Round, 2025–26.
- Attendance: 564 vs Winslow United on 14 April 2026 (Played at Winslow Recreation Ground).

== Player Statistics ==
Information correct as of 14th November 2026. Competitive matches counted only.

The player who holds the record as AFC Welwyn's top goal scorer is Kendall Ata Gyamfi, with 45 goals in all competitions.

The player with the record for the most number of goals in a season for AFC Welwyn is Kendall Ata Gyamfi, with 27 goals in the 2023/24 season.

The player with the record for the most number of goals in a single match for AFC Welwyn is Charlee Yearwood, who scored 5 against Milton Keynes Irish Reserves on 5 August 2023. This was equalled by Coree Wilson when he scored 5 goals in Welwyn's 5–3 win against Kempston Rovers in the Gladwish Challenge Trophy, on 15 September 2025.

AFC Welwyn scored the most number of goals in a single game against Huntingdon Town on 15 February 2025. A home game that resulted in an 11–0 victory, with 7 different players scoring.

Will McNeill became the youngest player to score a goal when he scored in the 12th minute against Newport Pagnell Town Development on 13 April 2024, aged 17. He scored twice in the match, helping the team to win 4–2.

Ashton Broome-Alexander became the youngest player to debut for AFC Welwyn, when he played in goal against Long Buckby AFC, while on loan from St Neots FC, on 27 July 2024, aged 17. He also holds the record for the goalkeeper with the most clean sheets in a season. 23 clean sheets (2024/25 season).

The player with the most appearances for AFC Welwyn is Kendall Ata Gyamfi, with 81 appearances in all competitions, and is the first player to pass fifty competitive games for the club.

The longest unbeaten run that the team has achieved is 24 competitive league games between November 2024 and April 2025.

== Management Team ==
=== Club officials ===
Management

Position	Name
Manager	(England) Myles Anderson
Assistant Manager	(England) Adrian Whitbread
First Team Coach	(England) TBC
Coach	(England) Warren Gladdy
Physio	(England) Michael Choudry
Kitman	(England) Kyran Pheby

==== List of Managers ====
Information correct as of 14th November 2026. Competitive matches counted only.

Table of AFC Welwyn managers, including tenure, record and honours
Name	Nationality	From	To	P	W	D	L	Win %	Honours
Richard James	England	1 July 2023	28 February 2024	26	16	1	9	61.54	
Liam Errington	England	29 February 2024	31 October 2024	30	21	7	2	70.00	Spartan South Midlands League Division Two champions & cup winners: 2023–24
Tawhid Juneja	England	1 November 2024	24 November 2024	6	4	0	2	66.67	
Brett Donnelly	England	25 November 2024	3 November 2025	46	34	4	8	73.91	Spartan South Midlands League Division One champions 2024–25
Callum Donnelly	England	4 November 2025	18 December 2025	7	1	1	5	14.29	
Scott Patmore	England	18 December 2025	10 September 2026	28	7	8	13	25.00	
Myles Anderson	England	10 September 2026		11	4	1	6	36.36	

Notes:

1. Statistics include the AFC Welwyn v Long Buckby game (5th April 2025). Postponed and eventually awarded as a 3-0 win by the FA.
2. Statistics do not include the Sarratt v AFC Welwyn game (6th May 2024). Postponed and eventually awarded as a 0-0 draw by the FA.

== Women’s Team ==
AFC Welwyn ladies, started in 2025, play in the Eastern Region Division One South.

Their first competitive game was against Garston Ladies in the FA Cup, which they won 2–0.

In their first season (2025–26), the women's team won the Bedfordshire & Hertfordshire Women's Premier Division and were unbeaten in the league for the whole season.

Best Women's FA Cup performance: First Round Qualifying, 2025–26, 2026–27

The player who holds the record as AFC Welwyn Ladies top goal scorer is Rachel Wall, with 21 goals in all competitions.

The player with the record for the most number of goals in a season for AFC Welwyn Ladies is Rachel Wall, with 20 goals in the 2025/26 season.

The player with the record for the most number of goals in a single match for AFC Welwyn Ladies is Rachel Wall, who scored 4 against Ware United Ladies on 26 October 2025.

AFC Welwyn Ladies scored the most number of goals in a single game against Wootton Blue Cross Lionesses on 22 March 2026, which they won 6-1.

The longest unbeaten run that the team has achieved is 17 competitive league games between September 2025 and August 2026.

Management

Position	Name
Manager	(England) Danny Barley
Coach	(England) Dave Madell

=== List of Managers ===
Information correct as of 16th November 2026. Competitive matches counted only.

Table of AFC Welwyn Ladies managers, including tenure, record and honours
Name	Nationality	From	To	P	W	D	L	Win %	Honours
Danny Barley	England	1 August 2025		36	19	7	10	52.78	Beds & Herts Women's Premier Division champions 2025–26

== Club Partners ==
The following is a list of the Club Sponsors and Partners of the AFC Welwyn football team.

- Main Club Partner - The Rise Group
- Away Shirt Partner - Herts Air Conditioning
- Partner - Meds For Less
- Partner - KCHR Accountancy
- Partner - Kilroy Films
- Media Partner - Leisure Leagues
- Youth Partner - Red Run 1
