= Leverstock Green =

Village in Hertfordshire, England

Coordinates: 51°45′N 0°26′W

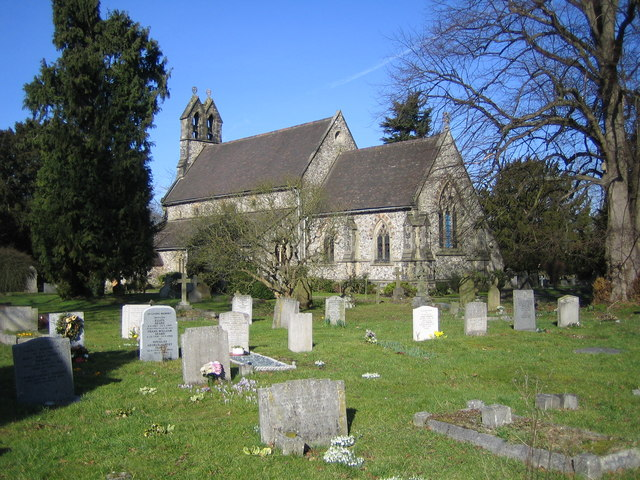
Holy Trinity Church

Leverstock Green is a village in the English county of Hertfordshire. It is located between Hemel Hempstead and St Albans

== Geography ==
Leverstock Green has a school, Leverstock Green Church of England Primary School, cricket club, tennis club, football club, village hall, shops, pubs and a Church of England parish church Holy Trinity Church, built in 1847-49 to the designs of architect Raphael Brandon, is Grade II listed. Leverstock Green is a "modern" ecclesiastical parish, formed about 1849 from parts of the parishes of St Michael's (St Albans), Abbots Langley and Hemel Hempstead.

== History ==
There is documentary and archaeological evidence that people lived and worked in the immediate area of Leverstock Green from the time of the Roman occupation onwards. Recent research indicates that settlement along Westwick Row may well date back even further to the Iron Age and perhaps the Bronze Age. It seems quite likely that this settlement was a "suburb" of the major Iron Age settlement at Pre Wood just outside St. Albans.

=== 1959 air incident ===
On Tuesday July 7 1959 at 11am, a plane carrying surveyors for the M1 crashed on the M10 motorway.It killed the pilot, Eric Ashton, and the 39 year old county surveyor of Holland, Trevor John L (January 9 1920 - 1959), who was married with a son of 11, and daughter of 7, and had parachuted as a Captain in the war, with the 1st Parachute Squadron of the Royal Engineers. He was the surveyor of Holland from January 1957, taking over from Major Rogerson. He married Betty Almond of Quadring, and lived at 11 Witham Bank East, in Boston, Lincolnshire. Other passengers were Ralph Pocklington, aged 57, head of the Highways committee of Holland County Council, Hedley Richardson, aged 40, from Gedling, in Nottinghamshire, and Robin Martin, aged 38, assistant managing director of Tarmac Civil Engineering. The aircraft was a De Havilland Rapide 'G-AHPT', hired by Tarmac from Don Everall Aviation of Wolverhampton.

=== Buncefield ===
Leverstock Green was affected by the 2005 Buncefield oil depot explosion (the largest explosion in peacetime Europe), causing damage to houses and other buildings, such as broken windows, fallen chimneys and in some cases more serious structural damage, temporarily displacing a number of families.

== Sport and leisure ==
Leverstock Green has a Non-League football club Leverstock Green F.C., which plays at Pancake Lane.

Leverstock Green also has a cricket Club called Leverstock Green Cricket Club, which plays on Bedmond Road.
