= Milton Keynes Irish F.C. =

Association football club in England

Coordinates: 51.9957°N 0.7121°W

Milton Keynes Irish
- Full name: Milton Keynes Irish Football Club
- Nicknames: The Irish, MK Irish
- Founded: 2020
- Ground: The Irish Centre, Manor Fields. Milton Keynes
- Capacity: 1,500
- Chairman: Tom McEvanny
- Manager: Terry Shrieves
- League: Southern League Division One Central
- 2025–26: Southern League Division One Central, 13th of 22
Home colours

Milton Keynes Irish Football Club is a football club based in Fenny Stratford, a constituent town of Milton Keynes, Buckinghamshire, England. They are currently members of the Southern League Division One Central and play at the Irish Centre, Manor Fields.

== History ==
The club was established in May 2020 by a merger of Milton Keynes Robins, Unite MK and Milton Keynes Irish Veterans, taking the place of Milton Keynes Robins in Division One of the Spartan South Midlands League. Following the abandonment of the 2020–21 season, the club were promoted to the Premier Division based on Milton Keynes Robins' results in the 2019–20 season (which was also abandoned), and the results of Milton Keynes Irish in their inaugural campaign.

At the end of the 2021–22 season they were transferred to the Premier Division South of the United Counties League. However, the club were transferred back to the Premier Division of the Spartan South Midlands League a year later. In 2023–24 they finished second in the Premier Division, qualifying for the promotion play-offs, going on to lose 3–0 to FC Romania in the semi-finals. The following season saw the club win the Premier Division title, earning promotion to Division One Central of the Southern League.

== Current coaching staff ==
As of 1 November 2025

Position	Staff
Manager	Terry Shrieves
Asst Manager	Glyn Creaser
Coach	Keelan Shand
Coach	Liam Smyth
GK Coach	Lee Brown
Physio	Andy Nicholls

Source: MK Irish

== Honours ==
- Spartan South Midlands League
  - Premier Division champions 2024–25

== Records ==
- Best FA Cup performance: First qualifying round, 2023–24
- Best FA Trophy performance: First qualifying round, 2025–26
- Best FA Vase performance: Third round, 2020–21
