= Northamptonshire Combination Football League =

Association football league in England

- Founded: 1953
- Country: England
- Number of clubs: 74 (including 25 reserve teams)
- Level on pyramid: Level 11 (Premier Division)
- Feeder to: Spartan South Midlands League Division One
- Relegation to: None
- Domestic cup: Knock-out cups for each division
- Current champions: Blisworth (Premier Division) (2024–25)
- Website: Official website

The Northamptonshire Combination Football League is a football competition based in England. It has a total of five divisions with many reserve teams competing in the bottom three. The most senior league is the Premier Division, which sits at step 7 (or level 11) of the National League System.

== Recent divisional champions ==
Since season 1991–92, divisional champions have been as follow:

Season	Premier Division	Division One	Division Two	Division Three	Division Four	Division Five
1991–92	Woodford United	Braunston United	Pattishall	Ford Sports A	–	–
1992–93	Milton	Crick Athletic	Weedon	Moulton Reserves	–	–
1993–94	Milton	Spratton	Flore Rovers	Earls Barton	–	–
1994–95	Milton	Wilby	Earls Barton	Brafield Unites	–	–
1995–96	Heyford Athletic	Brixworth All Saints	Woodford United Reserves	Wilby Reserves	–	–
1996–97	Towcester Town	Potterspury	Spratton Reserves	Wellingborough Grammarians OB Reserves	Rushden Saints	–
1997–98	Woodford United	Spencer United	Finedon Volta	Raunds Rangers	Ristee Towers	–
1998–99	Brixworth All Saints	Islip United	Harpole Reserves	Weavers Old Boys	Crown Wanderers	–
1999–00	Cold Ashby Rovers	Gretton	Rushden St Peters	Gretton Reserves	Northamptonshire Police	Kettering Park Rovers
2000–01	Cold Ashby Rovers	Stanwick Rovers	Northamptonshire Police	Stanion United	–	–
2001–02	Cold Ashby Rovers	Rushden Rangers	Weavers Old Boys	Kettering Park Rovers	–	–
2002–03	Milton	Caledonian Strip Mills	Finedon Volta	Wellingborough Darndale	–	–
2003–04	Moulton	Corby Hellenic	Ringstead Rangers	Corby Grampians	Rushden Arbuckle	–
2004–05	Caledonian Strip Mills	Priors Marston	Corby Grampians	Wilby	Yardley United	–
2005–06	Corby Hellenic Fisher	Corby Grampian	Welford Victoria	Corby Kingfisher Athletic	Cold Ashby Rovers	–
2006–07	Harpole	Whitefield Norpol	Corby Kingfisher Athletic	Punjab United	Wellingborough Raffertys	–
2007–08	Harpole	Weldon United	Cold Ashby Rovers	Corby Danesholme Vikings	Corby Strip Mills	–
2008–09	Harpole	Queen Eleanor Great Houghton	Finedon Volta	Wellingborough Old Grammarians	Kettering Ise Lodge	–
2009–10	Harborough Town	Welford Victoria	Corby Danesholme Vikings	Corby Everards	Long Buckby Ravens	–
2010–11	Brixworth All Saints	Ringstead Rangers	Wellingborough Ranelagh	Corby White Hart Locomotives	Dainite Sports	Corby Pegasus Reserves
2011–12	Harpole	Corby Quantum Print Vikings	Corby White Hart Locomotives	Corby Redstar	Daventry Drayton Grange	Bugbrooke St Michaels A
2012–13	Harpole	Earls Barton United	Corby Eagles	Northampton Exiles	Borough Alliance	Stanion Redstar Reserves
2013–14	Brixworth All Saints	Corby Eagles	Weedon	Wellingborough Rising Sun	Stanion Redstar Reserves	Weldon United A
2014–15	Corby Eagles	Daventry Dayton Grange	AFC Corby Shamrock	Desborough & Rothwell United	James King Bilsworth Reserves	Gretton Reserves
2015–16	James King Blisworth	Wellingborough Rising Sun	Desborough & Rothwell United	AFC Houghton Magna	Corby Pegasus Reserves	FC Foto Gold
2016–17	James King Blisworth	Gretton	Mereway	Weedon	Harpole Reserves	Irthlingborough Rangers
2017–18	James King Blisworth	Wootton St George	Finedon Volta	Weldon United Reserves	Moulton Reserves	
2018-19	James King Blisworth	James King Blisworth Reserves	Wollaston Vics Reserves	Stanwick Rovers	Kettering All Saints	
2019-20	COVID VOID	COVID VOID	COVID VOID	COVID VOID	COVID VOID	
2020-21	COVID VOID	COVID VOID	COVID VOID	COVID VOID	COVID VOID	
2021-22	Roade	Corby Locos	Thrapston Venturas	Kettering FC	David Green United	
2022-23	Irchester United	Higham Town	Corby Kingswood	Corby Siam Reserves	Weldon United	
2023–24	Corby Strip Mills	AFC Towcester	Brixworth All Saints	Spratton Reserves		
2024–25	Blisworth	AFC Towcester	Great Doddington	Daventry Town Hobbs	Grange Park Rangers	
2025–26	Roade	Thrapston Venturas	Daventry Town Hobbs	Corby Pegasus Reserves	Woodford United 'A'	

== Current structure ==
Sitting at Step 7 of the National League system, the Northamptonshire Combination has a promotion and relegation agreement with the United Counties League. Promotion is dependent solely upon a team making an application to the UCL and meeting the requirements to do so. Rushden Rangers are the latest team to do so, following their merger with Higham Town at the end of the 2006–07 season. Other teams to have made the journey upwards include Burton Park Wanderers, Harborough Town and Woodford United, all playing in the United Counties League. Clubs in the Northamptonshire area wishing to resign from the United Counties League will be placed in this competition. The league also accommodates Reserve sides from higher-level teams in the Reserve Divisions. Bugbrooke St Michaels are the best known example, with an 'A' and 'B' side involved in the competition, in addition to their first and reserve teams.

== 2026-27 members ==
=== Premier Division ===
- Corby Stewarts & Lloyds
- Earls Barton United
- Finedon Volta
- Harborough Town Development
- Harpole
- Heyford Athletic
- Higham Town
- Kettering Nomads
- Long Buckby
- Medbourne
- Milton
- Raunds Town
- Roade
- Rushden
- Spencer Hill
- Thrapston Venturas

=== Division One ===
- Blisworth
- Brixworth All Saints
- Corby Pegasus
- Corby Rovers
- Crick Athletic
- Great Doddington
- Harpole Reserves
- Higham Town Reserves
- Kettering Orchard Park
- Kingsthorpe Jets
- Kislingbury
- Spencer Mill Reserves
- Spratton
- West Haddon Albion
- Woodford United Development
- Wootton St George

=== Division Two ===
- AFC Woodford Wolves
- Blisworth Reserves
- Burton Park Wanderers Reserves
- Corby Pegasus Reserves
- Corby Stewarts & Lloyds Reserves
- Daventry Town Hobbs
- Finedon Volta Reserves
- Grange Park Rangers
- Kettering
- McPave
- Milton Reserves
- Stanwick Rovers
- Thrapston Venturas Reserves
- Weedon
- Weldon United
- Wilby
- Wollaston Victoria
- Woodford United 'A'

=== Division Three ===
- Brafield Corinthians
- Corby Rovers Reserves
- Corby Siam
- Corby Stewarts & Lloyds Reserves
- Long Buckby Reserves
- Raunds Town Reserves
- Roade Development
- Spratton Reserves
- Stanwick Rovers Reserves
- Thorplands Club 81
- Thrapston Venturas Development
- Weldon United Reserves
- Welford Victoria
- Wootton St. George Reserves

=== Division Four ===
- Crick Athletic Reserves
- Daventry Drayton Grange
- Hackleton Harriers
- Kettering Ise Lodge
- Kingsthorpe Jets Reserves
- Thorplands Club 81
- Woodford United 'A'
