= Moulton F.C. =

Coordinates: 52°17′6.55″N 0°51′29.41″W

Moulton
- Full name: Moulton Football Club
- Nickname: Magpies
- Founded: 1896; 130 years ago
- Ground: Brunting Road, Moulton
- Chairman: Pete Knight
- Manager: Gary Petts
- League: United Counties League Premier Division South
- 2025–26: United Counties League Premier Division South, 8th of 20
- Website: https://www.moultonfc.co.uk/
Home colours

Moulton Football Club is a football club based in Moulton, England. They are currently members of the United Counties League Premier Division South and play at Brunting Road, Moulton.

== History ==
Moulton were formed in 1896, playing their first game against the village of Old, resulting in a 2–2 draw. In 2004, the club won the Northamptonshire Combination Premier Division, finishing runners up in 2005 and 2006. In 2022, the club was admitted into the Spartan South Midlands League Division One.

At the end of the 2024/25 Season, Moulton finished 3rd and were promoted to the Premier Division South of the United Counties League, via the play offs.

== Ground ==
The club currently play at Brunting Road, Moulton. In 2018, a 3G pitch and 200 seater stand was installed at the ground.

== Records ==
- Best FA Cup performance: Extra preliminary round, 2025–26
- Best FA Vase performance: First round, 2025–26, 2026–27
