= F.C. Romania =

Association football club in England

FC Romania
- Full name: Football Club Romania
- Nickname: The Wolves
- Founded: August 2006
- Dissolved: May 2026
- Website: fcromania.com
Home colours

Football Club Romania was a semi-professional football club in England. Founded in 2006, they were initially based in East London, before relocating to Cheshunt in Hertfordshire in 2012. They folded in 2026 after losing their tenancy at the ground in Cheshunt.

== History ==
The club was established in August 2006 by Ionuţ Vintilă from Romania, with the team name reflecting the Romanian immigrant background of most of the team. They started in Sunday league football, initially playing in the Sunday London Weekend League. After winning their division at the first attempt, the club switched to Saturday football, joining the Essex Business Houses League in 2008. In 2010 they joined Division One (Central and East) of the Middlesex County League. After finishing as runners-up in their first season in the division, they were promoted to the Premier Division. In 2011–12 the club finished as runners-up in the Premier Division, but were unable to be promoted due to ground grading regulations.

In 2012–13 the club entered the FA Vase for the first time, beating Tring Athletic in the first qualifying round, before losing 7–0 at Hoddesdon Town in the next round. In the same season the club finished second in the Premier Division for a second successive season and were promoted to the Essex Senior League after a groundsharing agreement with Cheshunt allowed them to meet the ground grading regulations. The season also saw them win the Middlesex County League's Open Cup with a 3–1 win over Bratham in the final. In 2014–15 the club entered the FA Cup for the first time, reaching the second qualifying round, where they lost to Sutton United.

The 2017–18 season saw FC Romania win the Essex Senior League's Gordon Brasted Memorial Trophy, beating Takeley 1–0 in the final. The club also finished third in the league, and after Shaw Lane folded, they were promoted to the South Central Division of the Isthmian League as part of the league readjustments. At the end of the 2020–21 season, which was curtailed due to the COVID-19 pandemic, they were transferred to Division One Central of the Southern League.

Following a takeover of the club at the start of the 2022–23 season, John Mackie and Terry Spillane were appointed joint-managers, the first managers of the club since it was founded other than Vintilă. However, Mackie left after a month, and Spillane soon after. The club were near to collapse but Vintilă re-purchased the club in February 2023 and appointed himself as manager, but was unable to save the club from relegation after the league deducted 3 points for an ineligible player in November 2022 against Hadley at past regime, as they finished bottom of Division One Central and were relegated to the Premier Division of the Spartan South Midlands League.

In 2024–25 FC Romania finished bottom of the Spartan South Midlands League Premier Division and were relegated to Division One South of the Eastern Counties League. At the end of the 2025–26 season the club folded after their tenancy at Cheshunt's ground ended.

== Ground ==
The club originally played on Hackney Marshes, before moving to the Low Hall Recreation Ground in Walthamstow when they moved up to the Essex Business Houses League. When the club joined the Middlesex County League they began playing at Leyton Sports Centre. In 2012 the club began ground sharing with Cheshunt at Theobalds Lane.

=== Managerial history ===
- 2006 (Romania) Ionuţ Vintilă
- 2022 (England) John Mackie & Terry Spillane
- 2022 (Cape Verde) Chico Ramos
- 2023 (Romania) Ionuţ Vintilă
- 2025 (England) Rak Hudson
- 2025 (England) Ryan Handley

== Honours ==
- Essex Senior League
  - Gordon Brasted Memorial Trophy winners 2017–18
- Middlesex County Football League
  - Open Cup winners 2012–13

== Records ==
- Best FA Cup performance: Second qualifying round, 2014–15, 2017–18, 2018–19
- Best FA Trophy performance: Second qualifying round, 2020–21
- Best FA Vase performance: Fourth round, 2015–16

== See also ==
- F.C. Romania players
- F.C. Romania managers
