= 2026–27 FA Youth Cup =

Tournament details
- Teams: 540

Tournament statistics
- Top goal scorer(s): (England) Kyle Cross (Wycombe Wanderers) (5 Goals)

The 2026–27 FA Youth Cup is the 75th edition of the FA Youth Cup, an annual knockout football competition in domestic English football run by The Football Association for under-18 sides.

The competition consists of several rounds and was preceded by a qualifying competition, starting with one preliminary round which was followed by three qualifying rounds for non-League teams. The Football League teams entered the draw thereafter, with League One and League Two teams entered in the first round proper, and Premier League and Championship teams entered in the third round proper.

A total of 540 clubs were accepted into the competition 5 more than last year's competition. The defending champions are Manchester City who defeated Manchester United 2–1 at Academy Stadium in front of 4,380 fans.

== Calendar ==
Round	Matches played from	Matches	Clubs	New entries
Extra Preliminary round	17 August 2026	32	540 → 508	64
Preliminary round	31 August 2026	175	508 → 333	318
First round qualifying	14 September 2026	110	333 → 223	45
Second round qualifying	28 September 2026	66	223 → 157	22
Third round qualifying	12 October 2026	33	157 → 124	
First round	31 October 2026	40	124 → 84	47
Second round	21 November 2026	20	84 → 64	
Third round	12 December 2026	32	64 → 32	44
Fourth round	23 January 2027	16	32 → 16	
Fifth round	20 February 2027	8	16 → 8	
Quarter-finals	13 March 2027	4	8 → 4	
Semi-finals	10 April 2027	2	4 → 2	
Final	8 May 2027	1	2 → 1	

== Qualifying rounds ==
=== Extra Preliminary round ===
64 teams play in this round from the 7th to 9th tier. The draw was done on 3 July 2026 alongside the Preliminary Round. 1 team, Eastbourne Town left the competition at this stage resulting in 1 walkover.

Number of teams per tier still in competition
National League	National League North and South	Premier Division	Division One	Regional	Total
22 / 22	45 / 45	76 / 76	132 / 132	174 / 174	449 / 449

Tie	Home team (tier)	Score	Away team (tier)	Att.
Monday 17 August 2026
1	Cheadle Town (9)	5–2	Runcorn Linnets (8)	94
26	Horsham YM (9)	3–0	Roffey (9)	130
9	Stafford Rangers (8)	3–1	Halesowen Town (7)	
10	Desborough Town (9)	3–2	Histon (9)	105
22	Tooting & Mitcham United (9)	2–11	Merstham (8)	179
25	Three Bridges (7)	6–3	Chertsey Town (7)	57
27	Carshalton Athletic (7)	3–1	Littlehampton Town (8)	
Tuesday 18 August 2026
13	Lakenheath (9)	0–8	Newmarket Town (8)	44
21	Margate (8)	0–2	Dartford (7)	106
Wednesday 19 August 2026
4	Gresley Rovers (9)	2–3	Retford (9)	140
5	Lincoln United (8)	8–0	Ashby Ivanhoe (9)	110
15	Brentwood Town (7)	1–3	Hertford Town (8)	
18	Tring Athletic (9)	0–2	Leverstock Green (8)	140
19	Dulwich Hamlet (7)	5–2	Sevenoaks Town (8)	201
20	Faversham Town (8)	4–1	AFC Croydon Athletic (8)	

Tie	Home team (tier)	Score	Away team (tier)	Att.
23	Knaphill (9)	1–3	Haywards Heath Town (9)	66
30	Fleet Town (9)	2–3	Reading City (9)	132
31	Weymouth (8)	1–2	Sholing (7)	183
Thursday 20 August 2026
28	Horley Town (8)	W/O	Eastbourne Town (8)	NA
2	Sheffield (9)	2–0	Grimsby Borough (8)	80
3	Guiseley (7)	3–0	Emley AFC (7)	143
6	Stourport Swifts (9)	12–1	Dudley Town (9)	72
8	Shifnal Town (8)	4–1	Coton Green (9)	134
11	Harwich & Parkeston (9)	3–3 (3–2 p)	Fakenham Town (8)	45
12	Ely City (9)	5–1	Heacham (9)	115
16	Grays Athletic (8)	1–3	Saffron Walden Town (9)	
24	Hastings United (8)	1–0	Lingfield (9)	
29	Aylesbury Vale Dynamos (9)	5–0	Kidlington (9)	101
Friday 21 August 2026
7	Racing Club Warwick (7)	3–3 (5–3 p)	Malvern Town (7)	
14	Heybridge Swifts (9)	6–0	Hackney Wick (9)	49
17	Frenford (9)	1–3	Concord Rangers (8)	56
32	Gloucester City (7)	9–1	Larkhall Athletic (8)	90

=== Preliminary round ===
318 new clubs from tiers 7 through 9 will join the 32 winners from the extra preliminary round. Before the round began 26 teams withdrew from the competition, Baldock Town, Barton Rovers, Bemerton Heath Harlequins, Boro Rangers, Burnham, Chipstead, Cleethorpes Town, Corby Town, Coventry Sphinx, Glossop North End, Hallen, Jersey Bulls, Kings Langley, Lancaster City, Lower Breck, Lye Town, Maldon & Tiptree, Newcastle Benfield, North Greenford United, Petts Wood & Holmesdale, Shaftesbury, Uxbridge, West Auckland Town, Westfield, Whitby Town, and Yaxley. This results in 27 walkovers for the season so far. The draw was done on 3 July 2026 alongside the Extra Preliminary Round.

Number of teams per tier still in competition
National League	National League North and South	Premier Division	Division One	Regional	Total
22 / 22	45 / 45	71 / 76	121 / 132	158 / 174	417 / 449

Tie	Home team (tier)	Score	Away team (tier)	Att.
Monday 31 August 2026
1	Penrith (9)	W/O	Boro Rangers (9)	NA
2	Whickham (9)	W/O	Newcastle Benfield (9)	NA
21	Golcar United (9)	1–5	Pontefract Collieries (8)	
46	Tividale (9)	1–1 (2–4 p)	Brocton (9)	
51	Leek Town (7)	3–0	Sporting Club Inkberrow (8)	151
132	Bognor Regis Town (8)	6–1	Billingshurst (9)	89
134	AFC Whyteleafe (7)	A–A	Carshalton Athletic (7)	
136	Peacehaven & Telscombe (8)	0–7	Eastbourne Borough (7)	244
Tuesday 1 September 2026
175	Buckland Athletic (9)	0–0 (3–4 p)	Barnstaple Town (8)	142
9	Warrington Rylands (7)	1–5	Ramsbottom United (9)	
19	Vauxhall Motors (8)	1–3	Clitheroe (8)	
95	Aveley (7)	4–1	West Essex (9)	79
99	Harrow Borough (8)	3–1	Colney Heath (9)	38
107	Dartford (7)	2–1	Sheppey United (8)	152
123	Horsham YM (9)	7–0	Corinthian Casuals (9)	60
129	Lancing (9)	2–9	Broadbridge Heath (8)	
167	Slimbridge (8)	3–1	Brislington (9)	84
169	Cirencester Town (9)	1–7	Hartpury (8)	63
170	Frome Town (7)	2–2 (2–4 p)	Melksham Town (8)	63
43	Hereford Pegasus (9)	3–2	Whitchurch Alport (9)	
54	Boldmere St Michaels (8)	3–2	Rugby Town (9)	
55	Stratford Town (7)	3–0	Sutton Coldfield Town (8)	73
71	Cambridge City (8)	3–1	Newmarket Town (8)	
87	Walthamstow (8)	1–0	Cheshunt (7)	91
105	Beaconsfield Town (8)	0–2	Bedfont Sports (8)	74
113	Erith & Belvedere (9)	2–2 (7–6 p)	Phoenix Sports (9)	
114	Herne Bay (8)	2–2 (5–4 p)	Cray Valley (Paper Mills) (8)	57
116	Chatham Town (7)	1–0	Hollands & Blair (9)	202
124	Steyning Town Community (8)	2–0	Three Bridges (7)	80
128	Merstham (8)	20–1	Newhaven (9)	70
130	South Park (Reigate) (8)	0–1	Burgess Hill Town (7)	
131	Haywards Heath Town (9)	1–0	Abbey Rangers (9)	52
143	Basingstoke Town (7)	7–1	Ardley United (9)	
151	Alton (9)	W/O	Bemerton Heath Harlequins (9)	NA
158	Poole Town (7)	2–7	AFC Stoneham (8)	89
163	Chippenham Town (7)	6–2	Cinderford Town (9)	
173	St Blazey (9)	3–3 (2–3 p)	Tiverton Town (8)	
90	Hashtag United (8)	2–1	London Lions (8)	68
Wednesday 2 September 2026
4	Heaton Stannington (8)	1–7	Blyth Spartans (8)	
17	Atherton Laburnum Rovers (9)	0–3	Warrington Town (7)	122
64	Newport Pagnell Town (9)	6–0	Hitchin Town (7)	
31	Mickleover (8)	3–3 (5–4 p)	Eastwood (9)	
14	Cheadle Town (9)	6–2	FC United of Manchester (7)	106
15	Avro (7)	2–2 (5–4 p)	Abbey Hey (9)	280
38	Stamford (7)	0–4	Carlton Town (8)	101
53	Alvechurch (7)	1–2	Romulus (9)	90
84	Potters Bar Town (8)	0–4	Wingate & Finchley (7)	256
85	Enfield Town (7)	0–5	Barking (9)	115
93	Buckhurst Hill (8)	1–1 (3–4 p)	Ilford (9)	177
108	Chislehurst Glebe (9)	0–5	AFC Greenwich Borough (9)	
109	Crowborough Athletic (8)	2–3	Welling United (7)	109
139	Holyport (9)	3–5	Easington Sports (9)	45
141	Eversley & California (9)	0–8	Wokingham Town (9)	
146	Hartley Wintney (8)	0–3	Banbury United (7)	48
152	Bashley (9)	1–4	AFC Portchester (8)	64
166	Swindon Supermarine (8)	0–5	Bath City (7)	110
168	Thornbury Town (9)	3–4	Tuffley Rovers (9)	122
172	Willand Rovers (8)	4–4 (6–5 p)	Taunton Town (7)	
174	Saltash United (9)	0–2	Falmouth Town (8)	
7	Morpeth Town (8)	W/O	Lancaster City (7)	NA
10	Stalybridge Celtic (8)	2–3	South Liverpool (9)	80
23	Garforth Town (8)	4–2	Bottesford Town (9)	
32	Aylestone Park (9)	6–1	Retford (9)	
36	Quorn (7)	0–1	Matlock Town (8)	108
40	Stafford Rangers (8)	3–2	Droitwich Spa (9)	
41	Rugby Borough (8)	1–6	Racing Club Warwick (7)	91
45	Stourport Swifts (9)	4–0	Worcester City (7)	
47	Newcastle Town (8)	7–2	Shifnal Town (8)	73
49	Leamington (7)	5–2	Bromsgrove Sporting (7)	
72	Lowestoft Town (8)	3–2	Downham Town (9)	126
75	Leiston (7)	8–1	Mildenhall Town (9)	54
89	Brightlingsea Regent (8)	1–2	Hertford Town (8)	134
91	Sporting Bengal United (9)	0–2	Concord Rangers (8)	78
96	Woodford Town (9)	0–5	Bishop's Stortford (7)	
100	Everett Rovers (9)	1–5	Northwood (9)	
111	Dulwich Hamlet (7)	2–2 (3–4 p)	Erith Town (8)	191
119	Balham (9)	P–P	Cobham (8)	
121	Chichester City (7)	0–4	Kingstonian (8)	
122	Seaford Town (9)	0–3	Camberley Town (9)	
144	Windsor & Eton (8)	0–4	Didcot Town (8)	65
145	Marlow (8)	0–8	Thatcham Town (9)	
147	Yateley United (9)	5–1	Wallingford & Crowmarsh (9)	96
148	Portland United (8)	2–5	Hamble Club (9)	140
150	Gosport Borough (7)	4–5	Fareham Town (9)	132
156	Wimborne Town (7)	10–0	Petersfield Town (9)	
164	Cribbs (9)	0–3	Mangotsfield United (9)	65
171	Malmesbury Victoria (9)	0–15	Clevedon Town (9)	53
Thursday 3 September 2026
24	Cleethorpes Town (7)	W/O	Ossett United (8)	
25	Bridlington Town (8)	12–0	Beverley Town (8)	115
26	Liversedge (8)	17–0	Frickley Athletic (9)	96

Tie	Home team (tier)	Score	Away team (tier)	Att.
29	Guiseley (7)	8–0	Penistone Church (9)	114
69	Mulbarton Wanderers (8)	5–1	Gorleston (8)	
110	Ramsgate (7)	3–0	Rusthall (9)	90
133	East Grinstead Town (9)	1–2	Metropolitan Police (9)	72
135	Crawley Down Gatwick (9)	1–4	Leatherhead (7)	84
142	Reading City (9)	3–4	Bracknell Town (7)	
3	Pickering Town (9)	0–7	Newcastle Blue Star (9)	
11	Curzon Ashton (7)	0–2	Bury (7)	168
22	Tadcaster Albion (9)	4–5	Dearne & District (9)	
37	Anstey Nomads (7)	3–0	Hinckley AFC (9)	87
67	Dunstable (9)	W/O	Baldock Town (9)	NA
94	Tilbury (8)	2–1	Stanway Rovers (7)	109
120	Horley Town (8)	1–2	Hastings United (8)	
138	Binfield (8)	1–0	Abingdon United (9)	55
155	Sholing (7)	2–2 (3–2 p)	Christchurch (9)	79
160	Yate Town (7)	4–2	Gloucester City (7)	
165	Paulton Rovers (8)	2–4	Street (9)	
5	Kendal Town (9)	1–7	Stockton Town (7)	55
12	Trafford (9)	1–6	Irlam (9)	180
16	Atherton Collieries (8)	0–17	Wythenshawe (8)	
33	Grantham Town (8)	2–0	Blackstones (9)	128
34	Lincoln United (8)	4–1	Long Eaton United (8)	117
35	Deeping Rangers (9)	2–4	Basford United (8)	
39	Corby Town (8)	W/O	Leicester Nirvana (9)	NA
42	Stourbridge (7)	5–0	Pershore Town (9)	
Match played at Pershore Town
50	AFC Wolverhampton City (9)	2–0	Worcester Raiders (8)	
57	St Neots Town (8)	3–0	Harpenden Town (9)	48
59	FC Peterborough (9)	1–1 (6–5 p)	Daventry Town (9)	
60	Wellingborough Town (8)	4–1	Northampton ON Chenecks (9)	160
61	Eynesbury Rovers (9)	4–3	Godmanchester Rovers (9)	123
62	Desborough Town (9)	1–3	Moulton (9)	147
63	AFC Rushden & Diamonds (8)	W/O	Yaxley (9)	NA
65	March Town United (9)	3–0	Kempston Rovers (9)	63
66	Milton Keynes Irish (8)	2–2 (6–5 p)	Arlesey Town (9)	
68	Royston Town (8)	2–0	Leighton Town (7)	93
70	Ely City (9)	1–1 (2–3 p)	Harwich & Parkeston (9)	129
73	Needham Market (7)	3–2	Soham Town Rangers (9)	80
74	Dereham Town (9)	8–0	Thetford Town (9)	
76	Woodbridge Town (9)	2–0	Bury Town (7)	
78	Wroxham (8)	6–0	Brantham Athletic (9)	
79	Little Oakley (8)	2–4	Great Yarmouth Town (9)	47
80	Ipswich Wanderers (9)	1–3	Walsham Le Willows (9)	
81	Stowmarket Town (9)	0–2	Haverhill Rovers (9)	125
88	Takeley (8)	3–1	Redbridge (8)	
101	Flackwell Heath (8)	W/O	Burnham (9)	NA
104	Leverstock Green (8)	1–1 (3–2 p)	Broadfields United (9)	54
115	Deal Town (8)	2–1	Faversham Town (8)	136
117	Punjab United (8)	0–4	Cray Wanderers (7)	93
140	Risborough Rangers (9)	2–6	Aylesbury Vale Dynamos (9)	
149	Winchester City (8)	2–3	Moneyfields (8)	
154	Hamworthy Recreation (9)	2–1	Millbrook (Hampshire) (9)	53
157	Dorchester Town (8)	4–2	Havant & Waterlooville (7)	35
161	Bristol Manor Farm (8)	1–1 (2–4 p)	Bishop's Cleeve (8)	
162	Portishead Town (9)	9–1	Fairford Town (9)	
28	Sheffield (9)	9–1	Stocksbridge Park Steels (8)	95
77	AFC Sudbury (8)	6–0	Felixstowe & Walton United (8)	158
83	Saffron Walden Town (9)	1–3	Cockfosters (9)	
125	Ascot United (8)	2–2 (5–4 p)	Badshot Lea (9)	63
127	Sutton Common Rovers (9)	2–3	Lewes (7)	
52	Lichfield City (8)	1–5	Rushall Olympic (7)	90
Friday 4 September 2026
18	Glossop North End (9)	W/O	Hyde United (7)	NA
27	Handsworth (9)	8–2	Bradford (Park Avenue) (8)	
44	Redditch United (7)	2–3	Bedworth United (8)	
86	Bowers & Pitsea (8)	0–2	Hullbridge Sports (9)	194
92	Haringey Borough (8)	2–5	Ware (8)	110
112	Whitstable Town (8)	5–0	Sutton Athletic (9)	
20	Bootle (8)	3–3 (3–0 p)	Witton Albion (8)	
103	Hilltop (9)	0–7	Hanwell Town (7)	40
30	Ilkeston Town (7)	5–1	Alfreton Town (7)	171
6	Thornaby (9)	W/O	West Auckland Town (8)	NA
8	Whitby Town (7)	W/O	Workington (7)	NA
13	Burscough (9)	W/O	Lower Breck (8)	NA
48	Chasetown (8)	W/O	Lye Town (9)	NA
56	Coventry Sphinx (9)	W/O	Nantwich Town (8)	NA
58	Barton Rovers (8)	W/O	St Ives Town (8)	NA
82	Heybridge Swifts (9)	W/O	Maldon & Tiptree (7)	NA
97	Hayes & Yeading United (8)	W/O	Kings Langley (9)	NA
98	Uxbridge (7)	W/O	Rayners Lane (9)	NA
102	North Greenford United (9)	W/O	St Albans City (7)	NA
106	Sittingbourne (8)	W/O	Petts Wood & Holmesdale (9)	NA
118	Chipstead (9)	W/O	Sheerwater (9)	NA
126	Redhill (9)	W/O	Jersey Bulls (8)	NA
137	Pagham (9)	W/O	Westfield (8)	NA
153	Shaftesbury (8)	W/O	Bournemouth (9)	NA
159	Longlevens (9)	W/O	Hallen (9)	NA
Monday 7 September 2026
134	AFC Whyteleafe (7)	4–5	Carshalton Athletic (7)	
Wednesday 9 September 2026
119	Balham (9)	2–6	Cobham (8)	
Friday 11 September 2026
109R	Crowborough Athletic (8)	1–3	Welling United (7)	
Match was played because Welling United used an ineligible player.

=== Upsets ===
Giantkiller (tier)	Opponent (tier)
Upset of two leagues above
Ramsbottom United (level 9)	5–1 away vs Warrington Rylands 1906 (level 7)
Newport Pagnell Town (level 9)	6–0 at home vs Hitchin Town (level 7)
Romulus (level 9)	2–1 away vs Alvechurch (level 7)
Barking (level 9)	5–0 away vs Enfield Town (level 7)
Stourport Swifts (level 9)	4–0 at home vs Worcester City (level 7)
Woodbridge Town (level 9)	2–0 at home vs Bury Town (level 7)
Heybridge Swifts (level 9)	Walkover vs Maldon & Tiptree (level 7)
Rayners Lane (level 9)	Walkover vs Uxbridge (level 7)
Fareham Town (level 9)	5–4 away vs Gosport Borough (level 7)

=== First round qualifying ===
The 175 winners of the Preliminary round compete with the 45 teams from the National League North, and National League South. Farnborough, Truro City, and Worksop Town will not participate because the three clubs did not apply to compete. Before the round 4 teams Brackley Town, Penrith, Redhill, and Thornaby withdrew from the competition resulting in a walkover. This results in 31 walkovers in the competition so far. The draw was done on 4 September 2026.

Number of teams per tier still in competition
National League	National League North and South	Premier Division	Division One	Regional	Total
22 / 22	45 / 45	40 / 76	71 / 132	64 / 174	242 / 449

Tie	Home team (tier)	Score	Away team (tier)	Att.
Monday 14 September 2026
109	Willand Rovers (8)	2–2 (2–4 p)	Barnstaple Town (8)	
68	Dover Athletic (6)	3–1	Ramsgate (7)	171
70	Sittingbourne (8)	1–7	Chatham Town (7)	
87	Easington Sports (9)	2–0	Flackwell Heath (8)	96
2	Workington (7)	2–1	Spennymoor Town (6)	108
29	Romulus (9)	0–0 (1–4 p)	Newcastle Town (8)	
44	Bedford Town (6)	2–5	FC Peterborough (9)	
53	Billericay Town (6)	5–0	Takeley (8)	95
62	Bedfont Sports Club (8)	4–1	Hampton and Richmond Borough (6)	
73	Tonbridge Angels (6)	3–2	Erith & Belvedere (9)	171
76	Walton & Hersham (6)	0–2	Dorking Wanderers (6)	
77	Burgess Hill Town (7)	3–1	Farnham Town (6)	129
78	Horsham (6)	2–2 (5–4 p)	Metropolitan Police (9)	
79	Kingstonian (8)	3–2	Eastbourne Borough (7)	55
80	Broadbridge Heath (8)	1–2	Lewes (7)	
83	Mershtham (8)	1–0	Leatherhead (7)	153
88	Didcot Town (8)	1–1 (0–2 p)	Ascot United (8)	
89	Bracknell Town (7)	6–0	Banbury United (7)	
100	Thatcham Town (9)	2–1	AFC Portchester (8)	
104	Mangotsfield United (9)	5–2	Yate Town (7)	148
107	Clevedon Town (9)	5–1	Falmouth Town (8)	59
37	Leek Town (7)	0–4	Stourport Swifts (9)	132
Tuesday 15 September 2026
6	Hebburn Town (6)	4–0	Darlington (6)	110
7	Morecambe (6)	1–0	Burscough (9)	111
96	AFC Totton (6)	1–1 (7–6 p)	Basingstoke Town (7)	227
13	Macclesfield (6)	3–3 (2–4 p)	Cheadle Town (9)	161
99	Fareham Town (9)	2–4	Yateley United (9)	
110	Torquay United (6)	4–2	Weston Super Mare (6)	236
27	Spalding United (6)	1–14	Harborough Town (6)	
32	Stourbridge (7)	0–2	Hednesford Town (6)	
33	AFC Telford United (6)	2–1	Hereford Pegasus (9)	
35	Brocton (9)	1–5	Chasetown (8)	
48	Leiston (7)	5–3	Wroxham (8)	67
57	Bishop's Stortford (7)	2–2 (4–5 p)	Chelmsford City (6)	
65	St Albans City (7)	2–1	Hanwell Town (7)	
71	Whitstable Town (8)	6–1	Cray Wanderers (7)	
85	Steyning Town Community (8)	3–2	Haywards Heath Town (9)	
86	Sheerwater (9)	1–2	Bognor Regis Town (8)	
108	Tiverton Town (8)	0–7	Street (9)	
Wednesday 16 September 2026
8	Warrington Town (7)	6–1	Bury (7)	118
26	Matlock Town (8)	0–2	Anstey Nomads (7)	135
3	Morpeth Town (8)	5–1	Whickham (9)	68
10	Clitheroe (8)	0–3	Marine (6)	
11	Radcliffe (6)	0–3	Chester (6)	
17	Guiseley (7)	5–0	Garforth Town (8)	198
21	Scarborough Athletic (6)	1–6	Pontefract Collieries (8)	114
24	Carlton Town (8)	0–0 (2–4 p)	Grantham Town (8)	
75	AFC Greenwich Borough (9)	3–1	Dartford (7)	
84	Pagham (9)	1–9	Cobham (8)	
103	Hartpury (8)	1–1 (1–4 p)	Chippenham Town (7)	
9	Chorley (6)	7–0	Bootle (8)	178
12	Buxton (6)	0–5	Southport (6)	
14	South Liverpool (9)	2–3	Irlam (9)	
15	Wythenshawe (8)	1–1 (2–3 p)	Hyde United (7)	191
19	Handsworth (9)	1–1 (6–5 p)	Osset United (8)	85

Tie	Home team (tier)	Score	Away team (tier)	Att.
25	Lincoln United (8)	1–3	Ilkeston Town (7)	206
30	Stafford Rangers (8)	2–6	Nantwich Town (8)	
31	Stratford Town (7)	1–0	Bedworth United (8)	
34	Hereford (6)	2–2 (4–3 p)	AFC Wolverhampton City (9)	149
36	Rushall Olympic (7)	0–4	Boldmere St Michaels (8)	
41	AFC Rushden & Diamonds (8)	2–3	Milton Keynes Irish (8)	76
46	Lowestoft Town (8)	2–3	Haverhill Rovers (9)	134
54	Hertford Town (8)	0–0 (4–3 p)	Dagenham & Redbridge (6)	162
59	Ware (8)	0–4	Ilford (9)	
61	Northwood (9)	0–1	Hayes and Yeading (8)	115
66	Slough Town (6)	4–1	Chesham United (6)	158
Thursday 17 September 2026
18	Liversedge (8)	1–2	Bridlington Town (8)	62
4	Newcastle Blue Star (9)	2–2 (2–1 p)	South Shields (6)	
16	Avro (7)	5–3	Ramsbottom United (9)	
23	Leicester Nirvana (9)	1–0	Mickleover (8)	
55	Wingate & Finchley (7)	1–1 (1–4 p)	Tilbury (8)	67
64	Harrow Borough (8)	1–1 (2–3 p)	Hemel Hempstead Town (6)	69
81	Camberley Town (9)	1–0	Horsham YM (9)	70
90	Binfield (8)	1–2	Oxford City (6)	
98	Bournemouth Poppies (9)	0–9	Moneyfields (8)	
105	Slimbridge (8)	2–1	Tuffley Rovers (9)	146
38	Royston Town (8)	3–1	Dunstable (9)	68
39	Wellingborough Town (8)	2–2 (4–3 p)	Cambridge City (8)	90
40	Newport Pagnell Town (9)	0–2	St Ives Town (8)	
42	Moulton (9)	4–1	Eynesbury Rovers (9)	84
43	March Town United (9)	3–0	St Neots Town (9)	
45	Walsham Le Willows (9)	1–2	Great Yarmouth Town (9)	
47	Woodbridge Town (9)	2–2 (5–4 p)	Mulbarton Wanderers (8)	
49	Dereham Town (9)	0–4	Needham Market (7)	
50	AFC Sudbury (8)	8–0	King's Lynn Town (6)	
51	Braintree Town (6)	3–1	Harwich & Parkeston (9)	
60	Hullbridge Sports (9)	4–4 (3–5 p)	Barking (9)	
63	Leverstock Green (8)	7–1	Rayners Lane (9)	79
69	Erith Town (8)	1–2	Folkestone Invicta (6)	
72	Hastings United (8)	3–0	Ebbsfleet United (6)	
91	Aylesbury Vale Dynamos (9)	2–3	Wokingham Town (9)	
93	Hamble Club (9)	1–3	Alton (9)	173
94	Wimborne Town (7)	1–5	Dorchester Town (8)	
101	Bath City (7)	1–0	Portishead Town (9)	133
102	Melksham Town (8)	1–1 (2–4 p)	Bishop's Cleeve (8)	
106	Longlevens (9)	1–6	Merthyr Town (6)	70
20	Sheffield (9)	2–3	Dearne & District (9)	103
58	Cockfosters (9)	2–1	Concord Rangers (8)	163
Friday 18 September 2026
22	Basford United (8)	2–2 (1–3 p)	Aylestone Park (9)	301
28	Racing Club Warwick (7)	5–1	Leamington (7)	400
52	Walthamstow (8)	6–1	Heybridge Swifts (9)	169
67	Welling United (7)	4–1	Maidstone United (6)	210
74	Herne Bay (8)	1–2	Deal Town (8)	
95	AFC Stoneham (8)	2–0	Hamworthy Recreation (9)	151
56	Hashtag United (8)	1–4	Aveley (7)	101
97	Sholing (7)	4–0	Salisbury (6)	98
1	Blyth Spartans (8)	W/O	Penrith (9)	NA
5	Stockton Town (7)	W/O	Thornaby (9)	NA
82	Carshalton Athletic (7)	W/O	Redhill (9)	NA
92	Brackley Town (6)	W/O	Maidenhead United (6)	NA

=== Upsets ===
Giantkiller (tier)	Opponent (tier)
Upset of three leagues above
FC Peterborough (level 9)	5–2 away vs Bedford Town (level 6)
Cheadle Town (level 9)	4–2 in penalties in a 3–3 draw away vs Macclesfield (level 6)
Newcastle Blue Star (level 9)	2–1 in penalties after a 2–2 draw at home vs South Shields (level 6)
Upset of two leagues above
Bedfont Sports Club (level 8)	4–1 at home vs Hampton and Richmond Borough (level 6)
Mangotsfield United (level 9)	5–2 at home vs Yate Town (level 7)
Stourport Swifts (level 9)	4–0 away vs Leek Town (level 7)
Pontefract Collieries (level 8)	6–1 away vs Scarborough Athletic (level 6)
AFC Greenwich Borough (level 9)	3–1 at home vs Dartford (level 7)
Hertford Town (level 8)	4–3 in penalties after a 0–0 draw at home vs Dagenham & Redbridge (level 6)
AFC Sudbury (level 8)	8–0 at home vs King's Lynn Town (level 6)
Hastings United (level 8)	3–0 at home vs Ebbsfleet United (level 6)

=== Second round qualifying ===
The 110 Winners of the First round qualifying will compete with the 22 clubs from the 5th Tier National League. Barrow, and Scunthorpe United will not compete because both did not apply for the competition. The draw was done on 18 September 2026.

Number of teams per tier still in competition
National League	National League North and South	Premier Division	Division One	Regional	Total
22 / 22	25 / 45	23 / 76	35 / 132	26 / 174	132 / 449

Tie	Home team (tier)	Score	Away team (tier)	Att.
Monday 28 September 2026
1	Harrogate Town (5)	1–1 (2–4 p)	Gateshead (5)	516
3	Morpeth Town (8)	0–4	Stockton Town (7)	
63	Clevedon Town (9)	1–2	Slimbridge (8)	91
19	Kidderminster Harriers (5)	1–4	Hednesford Town (6)	449
28	Haverhill Rovers (9)	0–5	Leiston (7)	
44	Chatham Town (7)	2–0	Dover Athletic (6)	
45	Tonbridge Angels (6)	3–3 (4–1 p)	Horsham (6)	
51	Cobham (8)	3–2	Sutton United (5)	
57	Alton (9)	2–3	Thatcham Town (9)	
16	Harborough Town (6)	1–1 (7–8 p)	Grantham Town (8)	
Tuesday 29 September 2026
6	Cheadle Town (9)	1–0	Morecambe (6)	
8	Chester (6)	0–2	AFC Fylde (5)	
15	Anstey Nomads (7)	5–2	Aylestone Park (9)	
43	AFC Greenwich Borough (9)	4–2	Hastings United (8)	
7	Irlam (9)	1–0	Warrington Town (7)	
22	AFC Telford United (6)	3–0	Tamworth (5)	
Match was played at Shifnal Town.
23	Boldmere St Michaels (8)	1–3	Racing Club Warwick (7)	
41	Folkestone Invicta (6)	2–2 (8–9 p)	Whitstable Town (8)	222
46	Worthing (5)	2–1	Lewes (7)	87
47	Burgess Hill Town (7)	1–2	Kingstonian (8)	143
Wednesday 30 September 2026
11	Chorley (6)	3–1	Avro (7)	256
14	Bridlington Town (8)	0–2	FC Halifax Town (5)	
4	Newcastle Blue Star (9)	2–2 (4–3 p)	Carlisle United (5)	461
9	Southport (6)	0–1	Marine (6)	602
52	Easington Sports (9)	1–1 (5–3 p)	Bracknell Town (7)	90
53	Wokingham Town (9)	0–1	Slough Town (6)	150
54	Maidenhead United (6)	4–0	Oxford City (6)	214
18	Ilkeston Town (7)	6–2	Nantwich Town (8)	
21	Hereford (6)	4–2	Stourport Swifts (9)	200
32	Billericay Town (6)	2–2 (3–4 p)	Southend United (5)	278
36	Hertford Town (8)	3–0	Tilbury (8)	233
40	Hayes & Yeading United (8)	2–2 (3–2 p)	Wealdstone (5)	
62	Merthyr Town (6)	0–4	Forest Green Rovers (5)	267

Tie	Home team (tier)	Score	Away team (tier)	Att.
64	Chippenham Town (7)	3–2	Bath City (7)	232
66	Street (9)	8–1	Yeovil Town (5)	255
Thursday 1 October 2026
2	Hartlepool United (5)	4–0	Hebburn Town (6)	
Match was played at Hebburn Town.
65	Barnstaple Town (8)	0–2	Torquay United (6)	234
20	Newcastle Town (8)	1–0	Stratford Town (7)	
5	Blyth Spartans (8)	3–1	Workington (7)	
17	Leicester Nirvana (9)	0–0 (2–4 p)	Boston United (5)	62
25	March Town United (9)	2–5	St Ives Town (8)	
26	FC Peterborough (9)	2–3	Moulton (9)	
27	Milton Keynes Irish (8)	3–2	Wellingborough Town (8)	149 or 249
29	AFC Sudbury (8)	6–3	Royston Town (8)	210
30	Braintree Town (6)	1–2	Needham Market (7)	
31	Woodbridge Town (9)	2–0	Great Yarmouth Town (9)	83
39	St Albans City (7)	1–3	Leverstock Green (8)	
42	Deal Town (8)	6–3	Welling United (7)	155
55	Ascot United (8)	0–0 (2–4 p)	Camberley Town (9)	125
56	Dorchester Town (8)	1–1 (2–3 p)	Eastleigh (5)	
59	Moneyfields (8)	1–2	Aldershot Town (5)	
61	Bishop's Cleeve (8)	1–4	Mangotsfield United (9)	
24	Chasetown (8)	2–2 (3–4 p)	Solihull Moors (5)	297
37	Cockfosters (9)	4–0	Bedfont Sports Club (8)	243
Friday 2 October 2026
12	Dearne & District (9)	0–6	Guiseley (7)	
38	Hemel Hempstead Town (6)	4–0	Boreham Wood (5)	318
10	Hyde United (7)	0–3	Altrincham (5)	410
33	Walthamstow (8)	3–1	Barking (9)	251
34	Aveley (7)	1–0	Ilford (9)	
35	Chelmsford City (6)	6–0	Hornchurch (5)	
48	Merstham (8)	3–1	Bognor Regis Town (8)	97
Match was played at Colliers Wood United.
49	Carshalton Athletic (7)	2–4	Woking (5)	
50	Steyning Town Community (8)	2–2 (2–4 p)	Dorking Wanderers (6)	152
13	Pontefract Collieries (8)	2–1	Handsworth (9)	
60	AFC Stoneham (8)	0–2	AFC Totton (6)	180
Sunday 4 October 2026
58	Sholing (7)	4–2	Fareham Town (9)	

=== Upsets ===
Giantkiller (tier)	Opponent (tier)
Upset of four leagues above
Newcastle Blue Star (level 9)	4–3 in penalties after a 2–2 draw at home vs Carlisle United (level 5)
Street (level 9)	8–1 at home vs Yeovil Town (level 5)
Upset of three leagues above
Cobham (level 8)	3–2 at home vs Sutton United (level 5)
Cheadle Town (level 9)	1–0 at home vs Morecambe (level 6)
Hayes & Yeading United (level 8)	8–7 in penalties after a 2–2 draw at home vs Wealdstone (level 5)
Upset of two leagues above
Grantham Town (level 8)	8–7 in penalties after a 2–2 draw away vs Harborough Town (level 6)
Irlam (level 9)	1–0 away vs Warrington Town (level 7)
Whitstable Town (level 8)	9–8 in penalties after a 2–2 draw away vs Folkestone Invicta (level 6)
Easington Sports (level 9)	5–3 in penalties after a 1–1 draw at home vs Bracknell Town (level 7)

=== Third round qualifying ===
The 66 winners from the previous round will compete in the final round of qualifying for the FA Youth Cup Competition proper. The draw was done on 2 October 2026.

Number of teams per tier still in competition
National League	National League North and South	Premier Division	Division One	Regional	Total
13 / 22	13 / 45	11 / 76	17 / 132	12 / 174	66 / 449

Tie	Home team (tier)	Score	Away team (tier)	Att.
Monday 12 October 2026
30	Sholing (7)	4–7	Eastleigh (5)	
3	AFC Fylde (5)	2–2 (3–4 p)	Cheadle Town (9)	
Match was played at Kellamergh Park.
13	St Ives Town (8)	4–1	Moulton (9)	210
15	Aveley (7)	1–1 (2–4 p)	Leiston (7)	
23	Cobham (8)	3–3 (6–5 p)	Tonbridge Angels (6)	
28	Kingstonian (8)	2–1	Dorking Wanderers (6)	222
Match was played at South Park (Reigate).
31	Mangotsfield United (9)	3–1	Torquay United (6)	139
32	Thatcham Town (9)	1–4	Chippenham Town (7)	
Tuesday 13 October 2026
4	Chorley (6)	7–1	Altrincham (5)	371
16	Southend United (5)	5–0	Needham Market (7)	527
25	AFC Greenwich Borough (9)	P–P	Merstham (8)	
22	Slough Town (6)	4–0	Camberley Town (9)	175
Wednesday 14 October 2026
1	Hartlepool United (5)	1–1 (4–2 p)	Marine (6)	
Match was played at Horden Community Welfare.
12	Newcastle Town (8)	2–4	Anstey Nomads (7)	
27	Maidenhead United (6)	2–2 (3–4 p)	Chatham Town (7)	147
29	Forest Green Rovers (5)	3–1	Slimbridge (8)	372
7	Gateshead (5)	1–1 (4–3 p)	Irlam (9)	181
Match was played at Dunston.

Tie	Home team (tier)	Score	Away team (tier)	Att.
9	Hednesford Town (6)	0–1	Ilkeston Town (7)	370
14	Easington Sports (9)	1–4	Hereford (6)	122
24	Woking (5)	5–5 (2–4 p)	Hayes & Yeading United (8)	290
33	Street (9)	6–0	AFC Totton (6)	165
Thursday 15 October 2026
6	Guiseley (7)	0–1	FC Halifax Town (5)	331
2	Blyth Spartans (8)	4–1	Stockton Town (7)	
8	Milton Keynes Irish (8)	5–1	Grantham Town (8)	211
11	AFC Telford United (6)	2–2 (5–6 p)	Solihull Moors (5)	
Match was played at Shifnal Town.
18	Woodbridge Town (9)	0–7	AFC Sudbury (8)	175
21	Worthing (5)	5–3	Deal Town (8)	68
Friday 16 October 2026
17	Hertford Town (8)	3–1	Hemel Hempstead Town (6)	424
5	Pontefract Collieries (8)	0–4	Newcastle Blue Star (9)	
10	Racing Club Warwick (7)	0–0 (4–3 p)	Boston United (5)	
19	Chelmsford City (6)	1–1 (3–1 p)	Leverstock Green (8)	350
26	Whitstable Town (8)	0–2	Aldershot Town (5)	338
Sunday 18 October 2026
20	Walthamstow (8)	4–2	Cockfosters (9)	157
Match was played at Athletic Newham.
Wednesday 21 October 2026
25	AFC Greenwich Borough (9)	1–1 (4–5 p)	Merstham (8)	
Match was played at Petts Wood & Holmesdale.

Number of teams per tier still in competition after the Qualifying Rounds
National League	National League North and South	Premier Division	Division One	Regional	Total
9 / 22	4 / 45	6 / 76	10 / 132	4 / 174	33 / 449

=== Upsets ===
Giantkiller (tier)	Opponent (tier)
Upset of four leagues above
Cheadle Town (level 9)	4–3 in penalties after a 2–2 draw away vs AFC Fylde (level 5)
Upset of three leagues above
Mangotsfield United (level 9)	3–1 at home vs Torquay United (level 6)
Street (level 9)	6–0 at home vs AFC Totton (level 6)
Hayes & Yeading United (level 8)	4–2 in penalties after a 5–5 draw away vs Woking (level 5)
Upset of two leagues above
Cobham (level 8)	6–5 in penalties after a 3–3 draw at home vs Tonbridge Angels (level 6)
Kingstonian (level 8)	2–1 at home vs Dorking Wanderers (level 6)
Hertford Town (level 8)	3–1 at home vs Hemel Hempstead Town (level 6)
Racing Club Warwick (level 7)	4–3 in penalties after a 0–0 draw at home vs Boston United (level 5)

== Competition Proper ==
=== First Round ===
The 47 teams from League One and League Two joined the 33 winners from the previous round. Only Crawley Town from League Two did not participate in this round as they did not apply to enter the competition. The lowest ranked teams left in the competition are 9th tier clubs Cheadle Town, Mangotsfield United, Newcastle Blue Star, and Street. 9th tier club Cheadle Town, 8th tier clubs Hertford Town and Merstham, and 7th tier club Racing Club Warwick all won 5 straight games to make it from the Extra Preliminary Round to make it to the First Round Proper. The draw was done on 16 October 2026. Before the round began, League Two club Newport County withdrew from the competition resulting in a walkover for League One club Exeter City, the 32nd walkover in the competition.

Number of teams per tier still in competition
Premier League (Note: Premier League and Championship teams will join the competition in the third round.)	Championship	League One	League Two	Non-League	Total
20 / 20	24 / 24	24 / 24	23 / 23	33 / 33	124 / 124

21 October 2026	Fleetwood Town (3)	3–0	FC Halifax Town (5)	Fleetwood
19:30 GMT	Kelly 66'; Dunne 71'; Junaid 74'			Stadium: Highbury Stadium; Attendance: 188; Referee: James Atkinson

26 October 2026	Luton Town (3)	3–1	Stevenage (3)	Dunstable
19:00 GMT	42' (o.g.); Lesser 52'; Gawel 58'		77'	Stadium: Creasey Park; Attendance: 226; Referee: Rikki Woolford

26 October 2026	Hayes & Yeading United (8)	1–2	Kingstonian (8)	Burnham
19:30 GMT	80'		Putney 59' (pen.); Anderson 83'	Stadium: The 1878 Stadium; Referee: Anthony Browne

26 October 2026	Chippenham Town (7)	1–1 (a.e.t.) (5–3 p)	Eastleigh (5)	Chippenham
19:30 GMT	Feeney 62'	Report	Mosiakin 29'	Stadium: Hardenhuish Park; Attendance: 189; Referee: Jake Woolley
	Penalties
	Harris (penalty scored); Arlow (penalty scored); Bryden (penalty scored); Feeney (penalty scored); Hamilton (penalty scored)		Penalty missed Penalty scored

27 October 2026	Crewe Alexandra (4)	4–1	Oldham Athletic (4)	Crewe
19:00 GMT	Wilson 74', 85', 90+4'; Swannis 83'		Kershaw 35'	Stadium: Gresty Road; Referee: Thomas Fox

27 October 2026	Wigan Athletic (3)	4–0	York City (4)	Wigan
19:00 GMT	Reci 31'; Forshaw 66'; Roberts 72'; Gelhardt 86'			Stadium: Brick Community Stadium; Attendance: 298; Referee: Khalid Wahbi

27 October 2026	Chesterfield (4)	P–P	Milton Keynes Dons (3)	Matlock
19:00 GMT				Stadium: Causeway Lane; Referee: Gavin Scott
Note: Match was postponed due to a waterlogged pitch.

27 October 2026	Northampton Town (4)	0–3	Grimsby Town (4)	Northampton
19:00 GMT		Report	Sharp 10'; Horsman 21'; Binks 38'	Stadium: Sixfields Stadium; Attendance: 617; Referee: Christopher Walton

27 October 2026	Aldershot Town (5)	2–4	Wycombe Wanderers (3)	Aldershot
19:00 GMT	Koby Kircher; Popa		Cross (pen.); Harney-Rogerson	Stadium: Recreation Ground; Referee: Catalin Tanase

27 October 2026	Bristol Rovers (4)	3–2	Forest Green Rovers (5)	Bristol
19:00 GMT	Hammonds 3'; Salahi-Ali 41'; Fowler 59'		Robinson 10'; Trigg 90+1' (pen.)	Stadium: Memorial Stadium; Attendance: 443; Referee: Alex Matthews

27 October 2026	Tranmere Rovers (4)	6–0	Newcastle Blue Star (9)	Birkenhead
19:30 GMT	Duncan 14'; Macauley 29', 49'; Tewolde 36'; Casey 62'; Blake 75'			Stadium: Prenton Park; Attendance: 271; Referee: Daniel Sims

28 October 2026	Stockport County (3)	4–1	Rotherham United (4)	Stockport
19:00 GMT	Jones 10', 70'; Singh 87'; Astles 90'		Thornton 45+4' (pen.)	Stadium: Edgeley Park; Attendance: 463; Referee: James Owen

28 October 2026	Bradford City (3)	3–1	Huddersfield Town (3)	Huddersfield
19:00 GMT	Holt 33'; Whitehead 40'; Hewitt 50'		Spencer 43'	Stadium: Accu Stadium; Attendance: 653; Referee: Lewis Atkinson

28 October 2026	Notts County (3)	1–2	Burton Albion (3)	Nottingham
19:00 GMT	Muir 41'	Report	Shonhiwa 10'; Hetheridge 90+1'	Stadium: Meadow Lane; Attendance: 816; Referee: Corey Green

28 October 2026	Cambridge United (3)	A–A	Walthamstow (8)	Cambridge
19:00 GMT	McDougald 18'; Jolland 45'		Ayiro 5'; Okwereogu 37'	Stadium: Abbey Stadium; Referee: Adam Everett
Note: match was abandoned at the 64th minute due to an injury to a Cambridge United Player. The score was 2–2.

28 October 2026	Reading (3)	3–2	Cheltenham Town (4)	Reading
19:00 GMT	Ojo 11', 38'; Agyekum 59'		Croose 7', 90+3' (pen.)	Stadium: Madjeski Stadium; Referee: Timothy Schietroma

28 October 2026	Anstey Nomads (7)	1–4	Leicester City (3)	Anstey
19:30 GMT	Aston 45+1'		Fletcher 29'; Owusu 52'; Anugo 61'; Simons 64'	Stadium: Cropston Road; Referee: Aaron Ford

29 October 2026	Chorley (6)	3–1	Hartlepool United (5)	Chorley
19:00 GMT	Smith 15'; Redmayne 83', 88'		Raitt 49'	Stadium: Victory Park; Attendance: 422; Referee: Alexander Beckett

29 October 2026	Rochdale (4)	1–2	Cheadle Town (9)	Rochdale
19:00 GMT	Connolly 59'		Madew 31'; Tiernan 40'	Stadium: Spotland Stadium; Attendance: 323; Referee: Darius Bradley

29 October 2026	Walsall (4)	4–4 (a.e.t.) (6–7 p)	Solihull Moors (5)	Bescot
19:00 GMT	Worrall 20'; Oliver 48'; Nash 90+6'; Tuitt 111'		Hyde-Moore 43'; Grogan 73'; Slater 80'; Fallows 120+1'	Stadium: Pallet-Track Bescot Stadium; Attendance: 640; Referee: Richard Walker
	Penalties
	Nash (penalty scored); Oliver (penalty scored); Sjoerdsma (penalty scored); Bowes (penalty missed); Hunt (penalty missed); Harris (penalty missed); Griffiths (penalty scored); Bills (penalty scored); Tuitt (penalty scored); Hamilton-Wright (penalty missed)		Penalty scored Penalty missed

29 October 2026	Milton Keynes Irish (8)	2–5	Ilkeston Town (7)	Milton Keynes
19:45 GMT	Stevenson 57'; Mohammed 65'		Adi 40' (pen.), 85'; Hassan 56', 90+5'; Holmes-Bent 77'	Stadium: Manor Fields; Attendance: 253; Referee: Mario Stetakovic

29 October 2026	Barnet (4)	5–1	Chatham Town (7)	Edgware
19:45 GMT	Issott 5'; Waugh 13'; Macarthy 31'; Brown 45'; Rix 58'	Report	Henry 8'	Stadium: The Hive Stadium; Attendance: 435 (78 away); Referee: Josh Burns

30 October 2026	Southend United (5)	2–5	AFC Wimbledon (3)	Southend-on-Sea
19:00 GMT	Blake 47'; Johnson 79'		Ashamu 35'; Adebanjo 38', 59'; Smith 41'; Ekpenyong 72'	Stadium: Roots Hall; Attendance: 578; Referee: James Black

30 October 2026	Hertford Town (8)	3–1	Worthing (5)	Hertford
19:00 GMT	53' (pen.); 72'; 90+6'		Boddy 5'	Stadium: Hertingfordbury Park; Referee: Manny Chandwani

30 October 2026	Chelmsford City (6)	0–2	Leyton Orient (3)	Chelmsford
19:00 GMT			Drayton 43'; Scannell 90'	Stadium: Dunmow Group Community Stadium; Attendance: 509; Referee: Michael Scott

30 October 2026	Slough Town (6)	1–2	Gillingham (4)	Slough
19:00 GMT	Koroma 58'		Silva 18'; Procopi 43'	Stadium: Arbour Park; Attendance: 270; Referee: Adam Jackson

30 October 2026	Cobham (8)	1–0	Merstham (8)	Cobham
19:30 GMT	Fisher 70'			Stadium: Leg O'Mutton Field; Attendance: 288; Referee: Gerry Heron

30 October 2026	St Ives Town (8)	6–0	Racing Club Warwick (7)	St Ives
19:45 GMT	Harris 15'; Riordan 30'; Hines 60'; Whitehead 75'; Liggins 80'; Ward 85'			Stadium: Westwood Road; Attendance: 300; Referee: Joshua Evans

30 October 2026	Chesterfield (4)	0–2	Milton Keynes Dons (3)	Mickleover
20:00 GMT			Roper 41'; O'Keeffe 90'	Stadium: Station Road; Referee: Gavin Scott
Note: Match was originally going to be played on 27 October at Matlock, but was postponed due to a waterlogged pitch and moved to Mickleover.

31 October 2026	Exeter City (4)	W/O	Newport County (4)	Exeter
NA				Stadium: St James Park; Attendance: NA

2 November 2026	Sheffield Wednesday (3)	6–0	Gateshead (5)	Sheffield
19:00 GMT	Grainger 34', 76'; Chadbourne 36'; Robinson 84', 88' (pen.); Cawley 90+2'			Stadium: Hillsborough Stadium; Attendance: 413; Referee: Jason Smith

3 November 2026	Salford City (4)	0–2	Barnsley (3)	Kersal
19:00 GMT			Dunne 63'; Town 73'	Stadium: Moor Lane; Attendance: 475; Referee: Sam Parnaby

3 November 2026	Blackpool (3)	3–0	Accrington Stanley (4)	Blackpool
19:00 GMT	Wylezol 12'; Mannix 72'; Hockenhull 86'			Stadium: Bloomfield Road; Attendance: 394; Referee: Christopher Porter

3 November 2026	Port Vale (4)	1–4	Shrewsbury Town (4)	Burslem
19:00 GMT	Cook 41'		Aiston 65'; Houlston 79'; Fallon 82'; McLaurin 90+2'	Stadium: Vale Park; Attendance: 257; Referee: Benjamin Stott

3 November 2026	Leiston (7)	1–2	Bromley (3)	Leiston
19:00 GMT	Long 36'		Stammers 33'; Rope 44'	Stadium: Victory Road; Attendance: 134; Referee: Samuel Gasson-Cox

3 November 2026	Street (9)	2–3	Swindon Town (4)	Street
19:00 GMT	15' (pen.); 37'		Griffiths-Brown 43'; Hagan 53'; Da Costa 82'	Stadium: The Tannery; Referee: Carl Peters

3 November 2026	Plymouth Argyle (3)	6–0	Mangotsfield United (9)	Plymouth
19:00 GMT	Campbell 8', 87'; Maund 48', 50', 60', 69'	Report		Stadium: Home Park; Attendance: 248; Referee: James Long

4 November 2026	Mansfield Town (3)	2–2 (a.e.t.) (5–4 p)	Peterborough United (3)	Mansfield
19:00 GMT	Walters 17'; Merry 61'		Simmons 39'; Christoudias 88'	Stadium: Field Mill; Referee: Thomas Halloway
	Penalties
	Vardy (penalty scored); Rodgers (penalty scored); Hassall (penalty scored); Nicholls (penalty scored); Walters (penalty scored)		(penalty scored) Okoli; (penalty missed) Crozier; (penalty scored) Christoudias; (penalty scored) Sudakaran; (penalty scored) Arber

4 November 2026	Colchester United (4)	3–4	AFC Sudbury (8)	Colchester
19:00 GMT	Adesanya 6'; Emery 18'; Lieu-Smith 90+6'		Jolland 1', 23' (pen.); Oxborrow 45+1'; Clarke 64'	Stadium: Colchester Community Stadium; Attendance: 561; Referee: Paul Collier

4 November 2026	Blyth Spartans (8)	2–0	Doncaster Rovers (3)	Blyth
19:30 GMT	Zmich 19'; Cole 35'			Stadium: Croft Park; Attendance: 357; Referee: Kieran Downey

4 November 2026	Oxford United (3)	8–0	Hereford (6)	Marston
19:45 GMT	Adesanya 2'; Purcell 50' (pen.), 80', 90+1'; Vaughan 40'; Odhiambo 75'; Dourish 85'; Collins 88'			Stadium: The MGroup Stadium; Referee: Charlie Bullock

5 November 2026	Cambridge United (3)	2–0	Walthamstow (8)	Cambridge
19:00 GMT	Murefu 2'; Shinn 88'			Stadium: Abbey Stadium; Referee: Adam Everett
Note: The first match was abandoned at the 64th minute due to an injury to a Cambridge United Player. The score was 2–2.

=== Second Round ===
The 40 winners of the previous round will compete in this round. The lowest ranked team is 9th tier Cheadle Town. 9th tier club Cheadle Town and 8th tier club Hertford Town both won all 6 games from the Extra Preliminary Round to make it to the Second Round Proper. The draw was made on 30 October 2026.

Number of teams per tier still in competition
Premier League	Championship	League One	League Two	Non-League	Total
20 / 20	24 / 24	19 / 24	10 / 23	11 / 33	84 / 124

10 November 2026	Luton Town (3)	1–0	Gillingham (4)	Luton
19:00 GMT	El Gourja 24'			Stadium: Kenilworth Road; Attendance: 293; Referee: Jonathan Lam

12 November 2026	Blackpool (3)	3–1	Burton Albion (3)	Blackpool
19:00 GMT	Bertie 10'; Mannix 58'; Marsh 65'		Piper 12'	Stadium: Bloomfield Road; Attendance: 222; Referee: Francis Sibley

13 November 2026	Bradford City (3)	3–6	Crewe Alexandra (4)	Bradford
19:00 GMT	Parr 13'; Vipond-Smith 30', 35'		Swann 9', 74', 79'; Wilson 16'; Nsenga 36'; Bell 72'	Stadium: Valley Parade; Attendance: 697; Referee: Dylan Hague

13 November 2026	Hertford Town (8)	0–4	Cambridge United (3)	Hertford
19:00 GMT			Shinn 31'; Murefu 39', 40'; 61' (o.g.)	Stadium: Hertingfordbury Park; Attendance: 636; Referee: Ollie Kaya

13 November 2026	Ilkeston Town (7)	2–2 (a.e.t.) (4–3 p)	Tranmere Rovers (4)	Ilkeston
20:00 GMT	Holmes-Bent 60'; Robinson 76'		Casey 7', 37'	Stadium: New Manor Ground; Attendance: 292; Referee: Joshua Thompson
	Penalties
	Jackson (penalty scored)		(penalty scored) Macaulay; (penalty missed) Duncan; (penalty scored) Tewolde; (penalty scored) Garnett

16 November 2026	Bromley (3)	1–4	AFC Wimbledon (3)	Bromley
19:30 GMT	O'Donnell 30'		Adebanjo 10'; Ashamu 20'; Smith 40'; Ekpenyong 70'	Stadium: Copperjax Community Stadium; Referee: Byron Beard

17 November 2026	Wigan Athletic (3)	2–1	Mansfield Town (3)	Wigan
19:00 GMT	Reci 14'; Hughes 61'		Walters 54'	Stadium: Brick Community Stadium; Referee: Mark Reeves

17 November 2026	Shrewsbury Town (4)	1–1 (a.e.t.) (4–2 p)	Fleetwood Town (4)	Shrewsbury
19:00 GMT	Aiston 21'		Haselden 90+1'	Stadium: New Meadow; Attendance: 400; Referee: Henry Gregory
	Penalties
	Donnelly (penalty scored); Fallon (penalty missed); Rose (penalty scored); Worrall (penalty scored); Aiston (penalty scored)		(penalty missed) Junaid; (penalty scored) Cherry

17 November 2026	Bristol Rovers (4)	2–3 (a.e.t.)	Oxford United (3)	Bristol
19:00 GMT	Odumboni 90'; Carr 107'		Purcell 5'; Vaughan 113', 120'	Stadium: Memorial Stadium; Referee: Ella Broad

17 November 2026	Reading (3)	0–1	Swindon Town (4)	Reading
19:00 GMT			Grainge 60'	Stadium: Madjeski Stadium; Referee: Benjamin Maskery

17 November 2026	Wycombe Wanderers (3)	3–0	Leyton Orient (3)	High Wycombe
19:45 GMT	Stones 15'; Cross 42', 82'			Stadium: Adams Park; Attendance: 209; Referee: Matthew Childs

18 November 2026	Grimsby Town (4)	3–0	Chorley (6)	Cleethorpes
19:00 GMT	Hutton 19'; Sharp 52'; Edwards 90+3'			Stadium: Blundell Park; Referee: Adam Shimmin

18 November 2026	Barnet (4)	4–1	AFC Sudbury (8)	Edgware
19:00 GMT	Achodor 27'; Talwar 45'; Brown 70', 72'		Jolland 80'	Stadium: The Hive Stadium; Referee: Joshua Evans

18 November 2026	Stockport County (3)	8–1	Blyth Spartans (8)	Stockport
19:00 GMT	Stott 9', 11'; Astles 31', 58'; Jones 67'; Singh 69', 81'; Huddleston 89'		Cole 23'	Stadium: Edgeley Park; Attendance: 381; Referee: Lee Hible

19 November 2026	Chippenham Town (7)	0–3	Kingstonian (8)	Chippenham
19:30 GMT			Gashi 10'; Abrahams 16', 46'	Stadium: Hardenhuish Park; Referee: Jack Bromham

20 November 2026	Leicester City (3)	4–0	Milton Keynes Dons (3)	Seagrave
19:00 GMT	Anugo; Owusu; de Lisle; Szembel			Stadium: LCFC Training Ground; Attendance: 207; Referee: Adam Crosby-Smith

20 November 2026	Cheadle Town (9)	1–5	Sheffield Wednesday (3)	Cheadle
19:30 GMT	Adegoke 72'		29'; 31'; 35'; 42'; 52'	Stadium: Park Road Stadium; Attendance: 392; Referee: Ben Cotton

20 November 2026	Cobham (8)	1–4	Exeter City (4)	Cobham
19:30 GMT	Fisher 14'		Bellotti 48'; Grant 70'; Appleton 73', 75'	Stadium: Leg O'Mutton Field; Referee: Hüseyin Göçek

24 November 2026	Plymouth Argyle (3)	v	St Ives Town (8)	Plymouth
19:00 GMT				Stadium: Home Park; Referee: Matthew Uren

26 November 2026	Solihull Moors (5)	v	Barnsley (3)	Solihull
19:00 GMT				Stadium: Damson Park; Referee: Ryan Price

=== Third Round ===
A total of 44 teams from the EFL Championship and the Premier League joined in this stage of the competition. The lowest ranked team left in the competition was 8th tier side Kingstonian. The draw was done on 13 November 2026.

Number of teams per tier still in competition
Premier League	Championship	League One	League Two	Non-League	Total
20 / 20	24 / 24	12 / 24	6 / 23	4 / 33	64 / 124

2 December 2026	Luton Town (3)	v	Cambridge United (3)	Luton
19:00 GMT				Stadium: Kenilworth Road

2 December 2026	Sheffield United (2)	v	Wolverhampton Wanderers (2)	Scunthorpe
19:00 GMT				Stadium: Attis Arena

2 December 2026	Coventry City	v	Swindon Town (4)	Coventry
19:00 GMT				Stadium: CBS Arena

2 December 2026	Blackburn Rovers (2)	v	Crewe Alexandra (4)	Blackburn
19:00 GMT				Stadium: Ewood Park

3 December 2026	Lincoln City (2)	v	Leeds United	Lincoln
19:00 GMT				Stadium: Sincil Bank

3 December 2026	Derby County (2)	v	Chelsea	Derby
19:00 GMT				Stadium: Pride Park Stadium

4 December 2026	Manchester City	v	Newcastle United	Manchester
18:00 GMT				Stadium: Joie Stadium

4 December 2026	Crystal Palace	v	Millwall (2)	Croydon
18:30 GMT				Stadium: Selhurst Park

4 December 2026	Fulham	v	Swansea City (2)	New Malden
19:00 GMT				Stadium: Motspur Park

4 December 2026	West Ham United	v	Brentford	Romford
19:00 GMT				Stadium: Rush Green Stadium

9 December 2026	Norwich City (2)	v	Preston North End (2)	Norwich
19:00 GMT				Stadium: Carrow Road

9 December 2026	Ilkeston Town (7)	v	Hull City	Ilkeston
20:00 GMT				Stadium: New Manor Ground

10 December 2026	Queens Park Rangers (2)	v	Middlesbrough (2)	Hayes
19:00 GMT				Stadium: SkyEx Community Stadium

10 December 2026	West Bromwich Albion (2)	v	Watford (2)	West Bromwich
19:00 GMT				Stadium: The Hawthorns

12 December 2026	Bolton Wanderers (2)	v	Tottenham Hotspur	Horwich
11:00 GMT				Stadium: Toughsheet Community Stadium

12 December 2026	Sheffield Wednesday (3)	v	Southampton (2)

12 December 2026	Sunderland	v	Aston Villa

12 December 2026	Stockport County (3)	v	Leicester City (3)	Edgeley
				Stadium: Edgeley Park

12 December 2026	Shrewsbury Town (4)	v	Blackpool (3)	Shrewsbury
				Stadium: Croud Meadow

12 December 2026	Barnet (4)	v	Oxford United (3)	Edgware
				Stadium: The Hive Stadium

12 December 2026	Plymouth Argyle (3) or St Ives Town (8)	v	Birmingham City (2)

12 December 2026	Portsmouth (2)	v	AFC Wimbledon (3)

12 December 2026	AFC Bournemouth	v	Solihull Moors (5) or Barnsley (3)

12 December 2026	Everton	v	Nottingham Forest

12 December 2026	Arsenal	v	Cardiff City (2)

12 December 2026	Ipswich Town	v	Liverpool	Ipswich
				Stadium: Portman Road

12 December 2026	Wrexham (2)	v	Exeter City (4)

12 December 2026	Burnley (2)	v	Manchester United

12 December 2026	Grimsby Town (4)	v	Brighton & Hove Albion	Cleethorpes
				Stadium: Blundell Park

12 December 2026	Wycombe Wanderers (3)	v	Wigan Athletic (3)	High Wycombe
				Stadium: Adams Park

12 December 2026	Stoke City (2)	v	Charlton Athletic (2)

12 December 2026	Kingstonian (8)	v	Bristol City (2)

=== Fourth Round ===
Number of teams per tier still in competition
Premier League	Championship	League One	League Two	Non-League	Total
15 / 20	19 / 24	9 / 24	6 / 23	6 / 33	32 / 124

23 January 2027	v

23 January 2027	v

23 January 2027	v

23 January 2027	v

23 January 2027	v

23 January 2027	v

23 January 2027	v

23 January 2027	v

23 January 2027	v

23 January 2027	v

23 January 2027	v

23 January 2027	v

23 January 2027	v

23 January 2027	v

23 January 2027	v

23 January 2027	v

=== Fifth Round ===
20 February 2027	v

20 February 2027	v

20 February 2027	v

20 February 2027	v

20 February 2027	v

20 February 2027	v

20 February 2027	v

20 February 2027	v

=== Quarter-finals ===
13 March 2027	v

13 March 2027	v

13 March 2027	v

13 March 2027	v

=== Semi-finals ===
10 April 2027	v

10 April 2027	v

=== Final ===
8 May 2027

v
