= FA Youth Cup =

English football competition for under-18 sides

- Founded: 1952
- Region: England; Wales
- Current champions: Manchester City (5th Title)
- Most championships: Manchester United (11 Titles)
- Website: The FA Youth Cup
- 2026–27 FA Youth Cup

The Football Association Youth Challenge Cup is an annual knockout football competition in domestic English football run by The Football Association for under-18 sides. Only those players between the age of 15 and 18 on 31 August of the current season are eligible to take part. It is dominated by the youth sides of professional teams, mostly from the Premier League, but attracts over 400 entrants from throughout the country.

At the end of the Second World War the FA organised a Youth Championship for County Associations considering it the best way to stimulate the game among those youngsters not yet old enough to play senior football. The matches did not attract large crowds but outstanding players were selected for Youth Internationals and thousands were given the chance to play in a national contest for the first time. In 1951 it was realised that a competition for clubs would probably have a wider appeal. The FA Youth Challenge Cup (1952–53 season) was restricted to the youth teams of clubs, both professional and amateur, who were members of the FA.

The notion of a youth cup was thought of by Sir Joe Richards, the late President of the Football League. He initially put forward the idea to the league clubs but they were not enthused; Richards then took the idea to the Football Association, who liked the idea and created the competition in the same year. The Youth Cup trophy itself was purchased by the Football League during World War II. However, they never found a use for it. Football League secretary Fred Howarth found the trophy in a cupboard at the Starkie Street office and handed it over to the Football Association.

Manchester United are the competition's most successful club, winning it eleven times. The current holders are Manchester City, who defeated Manchester United 2–1 in the 2026 final.

The tournament has served as a springboard into the professional game for many top British players. The likes of George Best, John Barnes, Ryan Giggs, David Beckham, Gary Neville, Frank Lampard, Michael Owen, Steven Gerrard, Jamie Carragher, Joe Cole, Wayne Rooney, Theo Walcott, Daniel Sturridge, Jack Wilshere, and Gareth Bale had all won the tournament or played in the final. The 1991–92 FA Youth Cup famously spawned the rise of Fergie's Fledglings.

== Finals ==
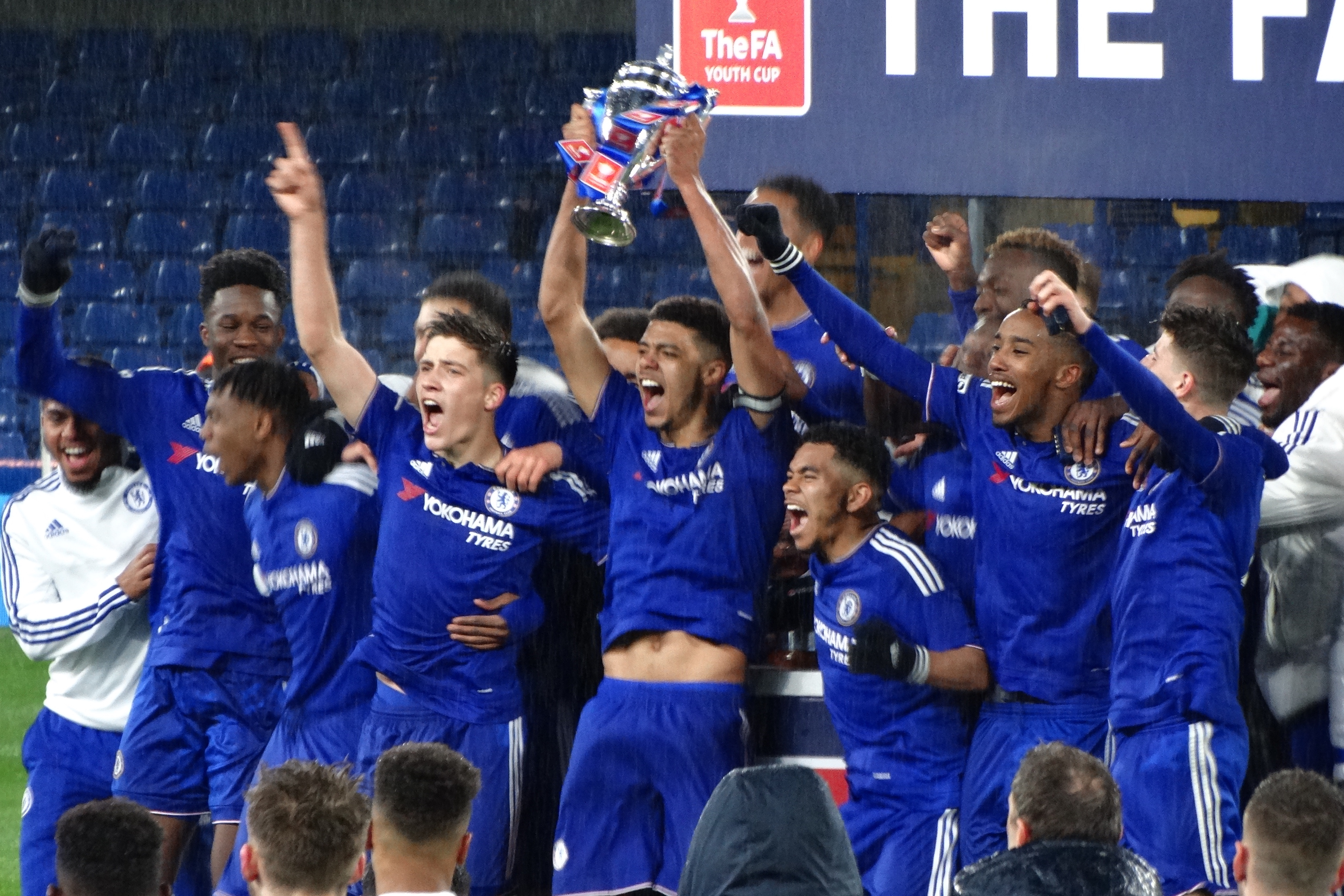
Chelsea players celebrating winning the 2015–16 FA Youth Cup.

| Season | Winners | Score (Note: Prior to 2018–19, finals were played over two legs; the aggregate scores are listed.) | Runners-up | Notes |
Two-legged format
| 1952–53 | Manchester United (1) | 9–3 | Wolverhampton Wanderers (1) | |
| 1953–54 | Manchester United (1) | 5–4 | Wolverhampton Wanderers (1) | |
| 1954–55 | Manchester United (1) | 7–1 | West Bromwich Albion (1) | |
| 1955–56 | Manchester United (1) | 4–3 | Chesterfield (3) | |
| 1956–57 | Manchester United (1) | 8–2 | West Ham United (2) | |
| 1957–58 | Wolverhampton Wanderers (1) | 7–6 | Chelsea (1) | |
| 1958–59 | Blackburn Rovers (1) | 2–1 | West Ham United (1) | |
| 1959–60 | Chelsea (1) | 5–2 | Preston North End (1) | |
| 1960–61 | Chelsea (1) | 5–3 | Everton (1) | |
| 1961–62 | Newcastle United (2) | 2–1 | Wolverhampton Wanderers (1) | |
| 1962–63 | West Ham United (1) | 6–5 | Liverpool (1) | |
| 1963–64 | Manchester United (1) | 5–2 | Swindon Town (2) | |
| 1964–65 | Everton (1) | 3–2 | Arsenal (1) | |
| 1965–66 | Arsenal (1) | 5–3 | Sunderland (1) | |
| 1966–67 | Sunderland (1) | 2–0 | Birmingham City (2) | |
| 1967–68 | Burnley (1) | 3–2 | Coventry City (1) | |
| 1968–69 | Sunderland (1) | 6–3 | West Bromwich Albion (1) | |
| 1969–70 | Tottenham Hotspur (1) | 1–1 | Coventry City (1) | Replay 2–2; second replay 1–0 |
| 1970–71 | Arsenal (1) | 2–0 | Cardiff City (2) | |
| 1971–72 | Aston Villa (3) | 5–2 | Liverpool (1) | |
| 1972–73 | Ipswich Town (1) | 4–1 | Bristol City (2) | |
| 1973–74 | Tottenham Hotspur (1) | 2–1 | Huddersfield Town (3) | |
| 1974–75 | Ipswich Town (1) | 5–1 | West Ham United (1) | |
| 1975–76 | West Bromwich Albion (2) | 5–0 | Wolverhampton Wanderers (1) | |
| 1976–77 | Crystal Palace (3) | 1–0 | Everton (1) | |
| 1977–78 | Crystal Palace (2) | 1–0 | Aston Villa (1) | |
| 1978–79 | Millwall (2) | 2–0 | Manchester City (1) | |
| 1979–80 | Aston Villa (1) | 3–2 | Manchester City (1) | |
| 1980–81 | West Ham United (2) | 2–1 | Tottenham Hotspur (1) | |
| 1981–82 | Watford (2) | 7–6 | Manchester United (1) | |
| 1982–83 | Norwich City (1) | 6–5 | Everton (1) | Aggregated extra time |
| 1983–84 | Everton (1) | 4–2 | Stoke City (1) | |
| 1984–85 | Newcastle United (1) | 4–1 | Watford (1) | |
| 1985–86 | Manchester City (1) | 3–1 | Manchester United (1) | |
| 1986–87 | Coventry City (1) | 2–1 | Charlton Athletic (1) | |
| 1987–88 | Arsenal (1) | 6–1 | Doncaster Rovers (3) | |
| 1988–89 | Watford (2) | 2–1 | Manchester City (2) | Aggregated extra time |
| 1989–90 | Tottenham Hotspur (1) | 3–2 | Middlesbrough (2) | |
| 1990–91 | Millwall (2) | 3–0 | Sheffield Wednesday (2) | |
| 1991–92 | Manchester United (1) | 6–3 | Crystal Palace (1) | |
| 1992–93 | Leeds United (1) | 4–1 | Manchester United (1) | |
| 1993–94 | Arsenal (1) | 5–3 | Millwall (2) | |
| 1994–95 | Manchester United (1) | 2–2 | Tottenham Hotspur (1) | Aggregated (no extra time played); 4–3 on penalty shoot-out |
| 1995–96 | Liverpool (1) | 4–1 | West Ham United (1) | |
| 1996–97 | Leeds United (1) | 3–1 | Crystal Palace (2) | |
| 1997–98 | Everton (1) | 5–3 | Blackburn Rovers (1) | |
| 1998–99 | West Ham United (1) | 9–0 | Coventry City (1) | |
| 1999–2000 | Arsenal (1) | 5–1 | Coventry City (1) | |
| 2000–01 | Arsenal (1) | 6–3 | Blackburn Rovers (2) | |
| 2001–02 | Aston Villa (1) | 4–2 | Everton (1) | |
| 2002–03 | Manchester United (1) | 3–1 | Middlesbrough (1) | |
| 2003–04 | Middlesbrough (1) | 4–0 | Aston Villa (1) | |
| 2004–05 | Ipswich Town (2) | 3–2 | Southampton (1) | Aggregated extra time |
| 2005–06 | Liverpool (1) | 3–2 | Manchester City (1) | |
| 2006–07 | Liverpool (1) | 2–2 | Manchester United (1) | Aggregated extra time; 4–3 on penalty shoot-out |
| 2007–08 | Manchester City (1) | 4–2 | Chelsea (1) | |
| 2008–09 | Arsenal (1) | 6–2 | Liverpool (1) | |
| 2009–10 | Chelsea (1) | 3–2 | Aston Villa (1) | |
| 2010–11 | Manchester United (1) | 6–3 | Sheffield United (2) | |
| 2011–12 | Chelsea (1) | 4–1 | Blackburn Rovers (1) | |
| 2012–13 | Norwich City (1) | 4–2 | Chelsea (1) | |
| 2013–14 | Chelsea (1) | 7–6 | Fulham (1) | |
| 2014–15 | Chelsea (1) | 5–2 | Manchester City (1) | |
| 2015–16 | Chelsea (1) | 4–2 | Manchester City (1) | |
| 2016–17 | Chelsea (1) | 6–2 | Manchester City (1) | |
| 2017–18 | Chelsea (1) | 7–1 | Arsenal (1) | |
Single match format
| 2018–19 | Liverpool (1) | 1–1 | Manchester City (1) | After extra time; 5–3 on penalty shoot-out |
| 2019–20 | Manchester City (1) | 3–2 | Chelsea (1) | |
| 2020–21 | Aston Villa (1) | 2–1 | Liverpool (1) | |
| 2021–22 | Manchester United (1) | 3–1 | Nottingham Forest (2) | |
| 2022–23 | West Ham United (1) | 5–1 | Arsenal (1) | |
| 2023–24 | Manchester City (1) | 4–0 | Leeds United (2) | |
| 2024–25 | Aston Villa (1) | 3–1 | Manchester City (1) | |
| 2025–26 | Manchester City (1) | 2–1 | Manchester United (1) | |

== Performance by clubs ==
| Club | Title(s) | Runners-up | Seasons won | Seasons runner-up |
|---|---|---|---|---|
| Manchester United | 11 | 5 | 1953, 1954, 1955, 1956, 1957, 1964, 1992, 1995, 2003, 2011, 2022 | 1982, 1986, 1993, 2007, 2026 |
| Chelsea | 9 | 4 | 1960, 1961, 2010, 2012, 2014, 2015, 2016, 2017, 2018 | 1958, 2008, 2013, 2020 |
| Arsenal | 7 | 3 | 1966, 1971, 1988, 1994, 2000, 2001, 2009 | 1965, 2018, 2023 |
| Manchester City | 5 | 9 | 1986, 2008, 2020, 2024, 2026 | 1979, 1980, 1989, 2006, 2015, 2016, 2017, 2019, 2025 |
| Aston Villa | 5 | 3 | 1972, 1980, 2002, 2021, 2025 | 1978, 2004, 2010 |
| West Ham United | 4 | 4 | 1963, 1981, 1999, 2023 | 1957, 1959, 1975, 1996 |
| Liverpool | 4 | 4 | 1996, 2006, 2007, 2019 | 1963, 1972, 2009, 2021 |
| Everton | 3 | 4 | 1965, 1984, 1998 | 1961, 1977, 1983, 2002 |
| Tottenham Hotspur | 3 | 2 | 1970, 1974, 1990 | 1981, 1995 |
| Ipswich Town | 3 | 0 | 1973, 1975, 2005 | |
| Crystal Palace | 2 | 2 | 1977, 1978 | 1992, 1997 |
| Sunderland | 2 | 1 | 1967, 1969 | 1966 |
| Millwall | 2 | 1 | 1979, 1991 | 1994 |
| Watford | 2 | 1 | 1982, 1989 | 1985 |
| Leeds United | 2 | 1 | 1993, 1997 | 2024 |
| Newcastle United | 2 | 0 | 1962, 1985 | |
| Norwich City | 2 | 0 | 1983, 2013 | |
| Wolverhampton Wanderers | 1 | 4 | 1958 | 1953, 1954, 1962, 1976 |
| Coventry City | 1 | 4 | 1987 | 1968, 1970, 1999, 2000 |
| Blackburn Rovers | 1 | 3 | 1959 | 1998, 2001, 2012 |
| West Bromwich Albion | 1 | 2 | 1976 | 1955, 1969 |
| Middlesbrough | 1 | 2 | 2004 | 1990, 2003 |
| Burnley | 1 | 0 | 1968 | |
| Chesterfield | 0 | 1 | | 1956 |
| Preston North End | 0 | 1 | | 1960 |
| Swindon Town | 0 | 1 | | 1964 |
| Birmingham City | 0 | 1 | | 1967 |
| Cardiff City | 0 | 1 | | 1971 |
| Bristol City | 0 | 1 | | 1973 |
| Huddersfield Town | 0 | 1 | | 1974 |
| Stoke City | 0 | 1 | | 1984 |
| Charlton Athletic | 0 | 1 | | 1987 |
| Doncaster Rovers | 0 | 1 | | 1988 |
| Sheffield Wednesday | 0 | 1 | | 1991 |
| Southampton | 0 | 1 | | 2005 |
| Sheffield United | 0 | 1 | | 2011 |
| Fulham | 0 | 1 | | 2014 |
| Nottingham Forest | 0 | 1 | | 2022 |

== Hat-tricks ==
Including qualifying and preliminary round matches.

| Player | Year | Match | Notes | Ref(s) |
|---|---|---|---|---|
| Duncan Edwards | 1953/54 | Manchester United ?–? Bradford Park Avenue | | |
| Duncan Edwards | 1953/54 | Manchester United ?–? Rotherham United | | |
| Gordon Bolland | 1960 | Chelsea 10–0 West Thurrock Athletic | Scored four goals in the game. | |
| Gordon Bolland | 1960 | Chelsea 9–1 Colchester United | Scored four goals in the game. | |
| Gordon Bolland | 1960 | Chelsea 11–0 Ford United | A match with two hat-tricks. | |
| Colin Shaw | 1960 | Chelsea 11–0 Ford United | Scored four goals in the game, in a match with two hat-tricks. | |
| Bert Murray | 1960 | Preston North End 1–4 Chelsea | | |
| Albert Kinsey | 1964 | Manchester United 4–1 Manchester City | | |
| David Sadler | 1964 | Manchester United ?–? Swindon | | |
| Michael Owen | 1996 | Liverpool 3–2 Manchester United | | |
| Michael Owen | 1996 | Liverpool 4–2 Crystal Palace | | |
| Aaron Lennon | 2002 | Leeds United 4–0 Gillingham | | |
| Dominic Solanke | 2013 | Chelsea 4–0 Dartford | | |
| Tammy Abraham | 2015 | Chelsea 6–1 Huddersfield Town | | |
| C. Horner | 2015 | F.C. United of Manchester 6–2 Southport | | |
| J. Mpofu | 2016 | Tamworth 5–3 Hednesford Town | | |
| D. Florence | 2016 | Luton Town 2–2 (4–3 (a.e.t.)) Dagenham & Redbridge | Scored for the losing team, in a match with two hat-tricks. | |
| J. Snelus | 2016 | Luton Town 2–2 (4–3 (a.e.t.)) Dagenham & Redbridge | Scored for the winning team, in a match with two hat-tricks. One of the longest hat-tricks in history (104 minutes). | |
| Ike Ugbo | 2017 | Chelsea 7–1 Tottenham Hotspur | | |
| C. Guy | 2017 | South Shields 10–0 ? | | |
| Mason Mount | 2017 | Birmingham City 0–5 Chelsea | | |
| Mason Greenwood | 2018 | Manchester United 4–3 Chelsea | | |
| Jake Young | 2018 | Guiseley 12–0 Harrogate Town | Scored five goals in the game, in a match with two hat-tricks. | |
| Tabish Hussain | 2018 | Guiseley 12–0 Harrogate Town | Scored five goals in the game, in a match with two hat-tricks. | |
| Tabish Hussain | 2018 | Guiseley 11–0 Rossington Main | | |
| Joe Hugill | 2019 | Shrewsbury Town 2–5 Sunderland | | |
| S. Towse | 2019 | Hornchurch 11–0 Dagenham & Redbridge | A match with two hat-tricks. | |
| S. Dutton | 2019 | Hornchurch 11–0 Dagenham & Redbridge | A match with two hat-tricks. | |
| Armando Broja | 2020 | Chelsea 4–0 Huddersfield Town | | |
| Lewis Johnson | 2020 | MK Dons 8–1 Hertford Town | | |
| C. Parks | 2020 | Holbeach United 8–0 Harborough Town | A match with two hat-tricks. | |
| James Clark | 2020 | Holbeach United 8–0 Harborough Town | A match with two hat-tricks. | |
| Mateusz Musiałowski | 2021 | Liverpool 4–0 Fleetwood Town | | |
| James Balagizi | 2021 | Leicester City 1–5 Liverpool | | |
| L. Stone | 2021 | Rugby Town 3–1 Solihull Moors | | |
| Abu Kamara | 2021 | Norwich City 4–2 Wolverhampton Wanderers | | |
| J. Simms | 2021 | Bradford City ?–? Oldham Athletic | | |
| B. Singh | 2022 | Eastleigh 8–3 Yeovil Town | A match with two hat-tricks. | |
| M. Dotse | 2022 | Eastleigh 8–3 Yeovil Town | A match with two hat-tricks. | |
| R. Oudnie-Morgan | 2022 | Ipswich Town 9–0 Aveley | | |
| A. Sbaiti | 2022 | Sutton Common Rovers 5–0 Loxwood | | |
| R. Wyatt | 2022 | Peterborough United 2–3 Northampton Town | | |
| Dom Ballard | 2022 | Coventry City 2–3 Southampton | | |
| Henry Sandat | 2022 | Billericay Town 1–4 Southend United | | |
| Patrick Casey | 2023 | Bury Town 1–4 Charlton Athletic | | |
| Justin Oboavwoduo | 2023 | Manchester City 5–0 Fleetwood Town | | |
| P. Croker | 2023 | Oxford City 5–1 Street F.C. | | |
| J. Lyons | 2023 | Rusthall 5–2 Chatham Town | Lyons' first goal, scored within seconds, was one of the fastest in history and the fastest in an under-18 match. | |
| E. Wenham | 2023 | Maidstone United 5–1 Dartford | | |
| Divin Mubama | 2023 | West Ham 6–1 Southampton | | |
| Olly Sully | 2023 | Forest Green Rovers 6–3 Thame United | | |
| Cameron Gardner | 2023 | South Shields 1–5 Grimsby Town | | |
| J. Naylor | 2023 | Sunderland RCA 1–6 Consett | | |
| S. Tomlinson | 2023 | Mickleover Academy 8–0 Leicester Nirvana | | |
| Lewis Koumas | 2024 | Liverpool 7–1 Arsenal | | |
| Z. Hardy | 2024 | Sherwood Colliery 1–5 Boston United | | |
| Harrison Armstrong | 2024 | Everton 7–0 Nottingham Forest | | |
| Sam Mann | 2025 | Tranmere Rovers 4–0 Harrogate Town | | |
| Alex Huntsman | 2026 | Bridlington Town 12-0 Beverley Town | | |
| Lewis Blanchard | 2026 | Bridlington Town 12-0 Beverley Town | | |

=== Multiple hat-tricks ===
Players who have scored multiple hat-tricks in the FA Youth Cup. As players are usually only eligible for the FA Youth Cup for one or two seasons (rather than indefinitely/their whole career), scoring multiple hat-tricks is an even more exceptional feat.

| Rank | Player | Club(s) | Hat-tricks |
|---|---|---|---|
| 1 | (England) Gordon Bolland | Chelsea | 3 |
| 2 | (England) Duncan Edwards | Manchester United | 2 |
| 2 | (England) Michael Owen | Liverpool | 2 |
| 2 | (Pakistan) Tabish Hussain | Guiseley | 2 |

== Attendance record ==
The highest attendance at an FA Youth Cup match was 67,492 for the Manchester United vs Nottingham Forest final at Old Trafford on 11 May 2022, which Manchester United won 3–1.

== International capped winners ==
Tables are ordered by date of first cap.

=== 1950s ===
| Player | Pos | Club | Year | National team | International debut |
|---|---|---|---|---|---|
| Keith Newton | DF | Blackburn Rovers | 1959 | England | v West Germany, 23 February 1966 |
| Shay Brennan | FW | Manchester United | 1955 | Republic of Ireland | v Spain, 5 May 1965 |
| Fred Pickering | DF | Blackburn Rovers | 1959 | England | v United States, 27 May 1964 |
| Mike England | DF | Blackburn Rovers | 1959 | Wales | v Northern Ireland, 11 April 1962 |
| Phil Kelly | DF | Wolverhampton Wanderers | 1958 | Republic of Ireland | v Wales, 28 September 1960 |
| Joe Carolan | MF | Manchester United | 1956 | Republic of Ireland | v Sweden, 1 November 1959 |
| Wilf McGuinness | MF | Manchester United | 1954, 1955, 1956 | England | v Northern Ireland, 4 October 1958 |
| Bobby Charlton | FW | Manchester United | 1954, 1955, 1956 | England | v Scotland, 19 April 1958 |
| David Pegg | FW | Manchester United | 1953, 1954 | England | v Republic of Ireland, 19 May 1957 |
| Billy Whelan | FW | Manchester United | 1953 | Republic of Ireland | v Netherlands, 10 May 1956 |
| Duncan Edwards | MF, FW | Manchester United | 1953, 1954, 1955 | England | v Scotland, 2 April 1955 |

=== 1960s ===
| Player | Pos | Club | Year | National team | International debut |
|---|---|---|---|---|---|
| Jimmy Rimmer | GK | Manchester United | 1964 | England | v Italy, 28 May 1976 |
| Billy Hughes | FW | Sunderland | 1967 | Scotland | v Sweden, 16 April 1975 |
| Dave Thomas | FW | Burnley | 1968 | England | v Czechoslovakia, 30 October 1974 |
| Dennis Yaager | MF | Everton | 1965 | Australia | v Iran, 4 November 1970 |
| Sammy Nelson | FW | Arsenal | 1966 | Northern Ireland | v England, 21 April 1970 |
| Pat Rice | DF | Arsenal | 1966 | Northern Ireland | v Israel, 10 September 1968 |
| Bobby Moncur | FW | Newcastle United | 1962 | Scotland | v Netherlands, 30 May 1968 |
| David Sadler | FW | Manchester United | 1964 | England | v Northern Ireland, 22 November 1967 |
| Peter Bonetti | GK | Chelsea | 1960 | England | v Denmark, 3 July 1966 |
| Terry Venables | MF | Chelsea | 1960, 1961 | England | v Belgium, 21 October 1964 |
| George Best | FW | Manchester United | 1964 | Northern Ireland | v Wales, 15 April 1964 |
| Bobby Tambling | FW | Chelsea | 1960 | England | v Wales, 21 November 1962 |

=== 1970s ===
| Player | Pos | Club | Year | National team | International debut |
|---|---|---|---|---|---|
| Terry Fenwick | DF | Crystal Palace | 1977, 1978 | England | v Wales, 2 May 1984 |
| Derek Statham | DF | West Bromwich Albion | 1976 | England | v Wales, 23 February 1983 |
| Steve Perryman | MF | Tottenham Hotspur | 1970 | England | v Iceland, 2 June 1982 |
| Steve Lovell | FW | Crystal Palace | 1978 | Wales | v Soviet Union, 18 November 1981 |
| Kevin O'Callaghan | MF | Millwall | 1979 | Republic of Ireland | v Czechoslovakia, 29 April 1981 |
| Noel Brotherston | MF | Tottenham Hotspur | 1974 | Northern Ireland | v Scotland, 16 May 1980 |
| Jerry Murphy | MF | Crystal Palace | 1977, 1978 | Republic of Ireland | v Wales, 11 September 1979 |
| Kenny Sansom | DF | Crystal Palace | 1977 | England | v Wales, 23 May 1979 |
| Peter Nicholas | MF | Crystal Palace | 1978 | Wales | v Scotland, 19 May 1979 |
| John Wark | MF | Ipswich Town | 1975 | Scotland | v Wales, 19 May 1979 |
| John Gidman | DF | Aston Villa | 1972 | England | v Luxembourg, 30 March 1977 |
| Brian Little | FW | Aston Villa | 1972 | England | v Wales, 21 May 1975 |
| Graeme Souness | MF | Tottenham Hotspur | 1970 | Scotland | v East Germany, 30 October 1974 |

=== 1980s ===
| Player | Pos | Club | Year | National team | International debut |
|---|---|---|---|---|---|
| David James | GK | Watford | 1989 | England | v Mexico, 29 March 1997 |
| Andy Hinchcliffe | DF | Manchester City | 1986 | England | v Moldova, 1 September 1996 |
| David White | MF | Manchester City | 1986 | England | v Spain, 9 September 1992 |
| Mark Walters | MF | Aston Villa | 1980 | England | v New Zealand, 3 June 1991 |
| Jeremy Goss | MF | Norwich City | 1983 | Wales | v Iceland, 1 May 1991 |
| Steve Morrow | DF | Arsenal | 1988 | Northern Ireland | v Uruguay, 19 May 1990 |
| Pat Scully | DF | Arsenal | 1988 | Republic of Ireland | v Tunisia, 19 October 1988 |
| Paul Gascoigne | MF | Newcastle United | 1985 | England | v Denmark, 14 September 1988 |
| Tony Rees | FW | Aston Villa | 1980 | Wales | v Norway, 6 June 1984 |
| John Barnes | FW | Watford | 1982 | England | v Northern Ireland, 28 May 1983 |

=== 1990s ===
| Player | Pos | Club | Year | National team | International debut |
|---|---|---|---|---|---|
| Leon Osman | MF | Everton | 1998 | England | v Sweden, 14 November 2012 |
| Richard Garcia | FW | West Ham United | 1999 | Australia | v South Africa, 19 August 2008 |
| Adam Newton | DF | West Ham United | 1999 | Saint Kitts and Nevis | v Barbados, 13 June 2004 |
| Francis Jeffers | FW | Everton | 1998 | England | v Australia, 12 February 2003 |
| Paul Robinson | GK | Leeds United | 1997 | England | v Australia, 12 February 2003 |
| Michael Carrick | MF | West Ham United | 1999 | England | v Mexico, 25 May 2001 |
| Joe Cole | MF | West Ham United | 1999 | England | v Mexico, 25 May 2001 |
| Alan Smith | FW | Leeds United | 1997 | England | v Mexico, 25 May 2001 |
| Stephen McPhail | MF | Leeds United | 1997 | Republic of Ireland | v Scotland, 30 May 2000 |
| Richard Dunne | DF | Everton | 1998 | Republic of Ireland | v Greece, 26 April 2000 |
| Gareth Roberts | DF | Liverpool | 1996 | Wales | v Finland, 29 March 2000 |
| Matt Jones | MF | Leeds United | 1997 | Wales | v Switzerland, 9 October 1999 |
| Jonathan Woodgate | DF | Leeds United | 1997 | England | v Bulgaria, 9 June 1999 |
| Jamie Carragher | DF | Liverpool | 1996 | England | v Hungary, 29 April 1999 |
| David Johnson | FW | Manchester United | 1995 | Jamaica | v Trinidad and Tobago, 28 March 1999 |
| Alan Maybury | DF | Leeds United | 1997 | Republic of Ireland | v Czech Republic, 25 March 1998 |
| Michael Owen | FW | Liverpool | 1996 | England | v Chile, 11 February 1998 |
| Nicky Butt | MF | Manchester United | 1992 | England | v Mexico, 29 March 1997 |
| Philip Mulryne | MF | Manchester United | 1995 | Northern Ireland | v Belgium, 11 February 1997 |
| David Beckham | MF | Manchester United | 1992 | England | v Moldova, 1 September 1996 |
| Phil Neville | DF | Manchester United | 1995 | England | v China, 23 May 1996 |
| Simon Davies | MF | Manchester United | 1992 | Wales | v Switzerland, 24 April 1996 |
| Harry Kewell | MF | Leeds United | 1997 | Australia | v Chile, 24 April 1996 |
| Robbie Savage | FW | Manchester United | 1992 | Wales | v Albania, 15 November 1995 |
| Gary Neville | DF | Manchester United | 1992 | England | v Japan, 3 June 1995 |
| Keith Gillespie | MF | Manchester United | 1992 | Northern Ireland | v Portugal, 7 September 1994 |
| Ryan Giggs | FW | Manchester United | 1992 | Wales | v Germany, 16 October 1991 |

=== 2000s ===
| Player | Pos | Club | Year | National team | International debut |
|---|---|---|---|---|---|
| Gilles Sunu | FW | Arsenal | 2009 | Togo | v Gambia, 12 October 2018 |
| Kieran Trippier | DF | Manchester City | 2008 | England | v France, 13 June 2017 |
| Tom Heaton | GK | Manchester United | 2003 | England | v Australia, 27 May 2016 |
| Abdisalam Ibrahim | MF | Manchester City | 2008 | Norway | v Moldova, 15 January 2014 |
| Justin Hoyte | MF | Arsenal | 2001 | Trinidad and Tobago | v Romania, 4 June 2013 |
| Oğuzhan Özyakup | MF | Arsenal | 2009 | Turkey | v Latvia, 28 May 2013 |
| Emmanuel Frimpong | MF | Arsenal | 2009 | Ghana | v Sudan, 24 March 2013 |
| Daniel Sturridge | FW | Manchester City | 2008 | England | v Sweden, 15 November 2011 |
| Jay Bothroyd | FW | Arsenal | 2000 | England | v France, 13 November 2010 |
| Dedryck Boyata | DF | Manchester City | 2008 | Belgium | v Austria, 12 October 2010 |
| Phil Bardsley | DF | Manchester United | 2003 | Scotland | v Spain, 11 October 2010 |
| Jack Wilshere | MF | Arsenal | 2009 | England | v Hungary, 11 August 2010 |
| Adam Johnson | MF | Middlesbrough | 2004 | England | v Mexico, 24 May 2010 |
| Vladimír Weiss | MF | Manchester City | 2008 | Slovakia | v Iceland, 12 August 2009 |
| Ryan McGivern | DF | Manchester City | 2008 | Northern Ireland | v Scotland, 20 August 2008 |
| James Morrison | MF | Middlesbrough | 2004 | Scotland | v Czech Republic, 30 May 2008 |
| Paul McShane | DF | Manchester United | 2003 | Republic of Ireland | v Czech Republic, 11 October 2006 |
| Wayne Henderson | GK | Aston Villa | 2002 | Republic of Ireland | v Sweden, 1 March 2006 |
| Kieran Richardson | MF | Manchester United | 2003 | England | v United States, 28 May 2005 |
| Steven Davis | MF | Aston Villa | 2002 | Northern Ireland | v Canada, 9 February 2005 |
| Graham Barrett | FW | Arsenal | 2000 | Republic of Ireland | v Jamaica, 3 June 2004 |

=== 2010s ===
| Player | Pos | Club | Year | National team | International debut |
|---|---|---|---|---|---|
| Trevoh Chalobah | DF | Chelsea | 2016, 2017 | England | v Senegal, 10 June 2025 |
| Juan Castillo | DF | Chelsea | 2017, 2018 | Dominican Republic | v Puerto Rico, 22 March 2025 |
| Vítězslav Jaroš | GK | Liverpool | 2019 | Czech Republic | v Malta, 7 June 2024 |
| Jay Dasilva | DF | Chelsea | 2014, 2015, 2016 | Wales | v Gibraltar, 6 June 2024 |
| Marcin Bułka | GK | Chelsea | 2017, 2018 | Poland | v Latvia, 21 November 2023 |
| Yasser Larouci | DF | Liverpool | 2019 | Algeria | v Egypt, 16 October 2023 |
| Abdi Sharif | MF | Liverpool | 2019 | Somalia | v Niger, 14 October 2023 |
| Tariq Lamptey | DF | Chelsea | 2017, 2018 | Ghana | v Brazil, 23 September 2022 |
| Marc Guéhi | DF | Chelsea | 2017, 2018 | England | v Switzerland, 26 March 2022 |
| Conor Gallagher | MF | Chelsea | 2017, 2018 | England | v San Marino, 14 November 2021 |
| Iké Ugbo | FW | Chelsea | 2016, 2017 | Canada | v Costa Rica, 12 November 2021 |
| Will Keane | MF | Manchester United | 2011 | Republic of Ireland | v Portugal, 11 November 2021 |
| Billy Gilmour | MF | Chelsea | 2018 | Scotland | v Netherlands, 2 June 2021 |
| Kasey Palmer | MF | Chelsea | 2014, 2015 | Jamaica | v United States, 25 March 2021 |
| Rohan Ince | MF | Chelsea | 2010 | Montserrat | v Antigua and Barbuda, 24 March 2021 |
| Ravel Morrison | FW | Manchester United | 2011 | Jamaica | v Saudi Arabia, 14 November 2020 |
| Kevin Wright | DF | Chelsea | 2013 | Sierra Leone | v Mauritania, 9 October 2020 |
| Reece James | DF | Chelsea | 2017, 2018 | England | v Wales, 8 October 2020 |
| Neco Williams | DF | Liverpool | 2019 | Wales | v Finland, 3 September 2020 |
| Sam Johnstone | GK | Manchester United | 2011 | England | v Romania, 6 June 2020 |
| Fikayo Tomori | DF | Chelsea | 2015, 2016 | England | v Kosovo, 17 November 2019 |
| Mason Mount | MF | Chelsea | 2016, 2017 | England | v Bulgaria, 7 September 2019 |
| Callum Hudson-Odoi | MF | Chelsea | 2017, 2018 | England | v Czech Republic, 22 March 2019 |
| Nathaniel Chalobah | MF | Chelsea | 2012 | England | v Spain, 15 October 2018 |
| Dominic Solanke | FW | Chelsea | 2014, 2015 | England | v Brazil, 14 November 2017 |
| Ruben Loftus-Cheek | MF | Chelsea | 2012, 2014 | England | v Germany, 10 November 2017 |
| Tammy Abraham | FW | Chelsea | 2015, 2016 | England | v Germany, 10 November 2017 |
| Mukhtar Ali | MF | Chelsea | 2014, 2015, 2016 | Saudi Arabia | v Jamaica, 7 October 2017 |
| Ola Aina | DF | Chelsea | 2014, 2015 | Nigeria | v Zambia, 7 October 2017 |
| George Saville | MF | Chelsea | 2010 | Northern Ireland | v Germany, 5 October 2017 |
| Jérémie Boga | FW | Chelsea | 2014, 2015 | Ivory Coast | v Guinea, 4 June 2017 |
| Nathan Aké | DF | Chelsea | 2012, 2013 | Netherlands | v Morocco, 31 May 2017 |
| Michael Keane | DF | Manchester United | 2011 | England | v Germany, 22 March 2017 |
| Jesse Lingard | FW | Manchester United | 2011 | England | v Malta, 8 October 2016 |
| Tom Lawrence | MF | Manchester United | 2011 | Wales | v Andorra, 13 October 2015 |
| Aziz Deen-Conteh | DF | Chelsea | 2010 | Sierra Leone | v Malawi, 7 October 2015 |
| Andreas Christensen | DF | Chelsea | 2013, 2014 | Denmark | v Montenegro, 8 June 2015 |
| Aliu Djaló | MF | Chelsea | 2010 | Guinea-Bissau | v Zambia, 4 June 2016 |
| Paul Pogba | MF | Manchester United | 2011 | France | v Georgia, 22 March 2013 |
| Gökhan Töre | MF | Chelsea | 2010 | Turkey | v Estonia, 10 August 2011 |
| Jeffrey Bruma | DF | Chelsea | 2010 | Netherlands | v Ukraine, 12 August 2010 |

=== 2020s ===
| Player | Pos | Club | Year | National team | International debut |
|---|---|---|---|---|---|
| Carney Chukwuemeka | MF | Aston Villa | 2021 | Austria | v Ghana, 27 March 2026 |
| Patrick Kelly | MF | West Ham United | 2023 | Northern Ireland | v Luxembourg, 17 November 2025 |
| Cieran Slicker | GK | Manchester City | 2020 | Scotland | v Iceland, 6 June 2025 |
| Taylor Harwood-Bellis | DF | Manchester City | 2020 | England | v Republic of Ireland, 17 November 2024 |
| Morgan Rogers | MF | Manchester City | 2020 | England | v Greece, 14 November 2024 |
| Maxi Oyedele | MF | Manchester United | 2022 | Poland | v Portugal, 12 October 2024 |
| Kobbie Mainoo | MF | Manchester United | 2022 | England | v Brazil, 23 March 2024 |
| Cole Palmer | FW | Manchester City | 2020 | England | v Malta, 17 November 2023 |
| Oscar Bobb | FW | Manchester City | 2020 | Norway | v Cyprus, 12 October 2023 |
| Callum Marshall | FW | West Ham United | 2023 | Northern Ireland | v Denmark, 16 June 2023 |
| Alejandro Garnacho | FW | Manchester United | 2022 | Argentina | v Australia, 15 June 2023 |
| Alexander Robertson | MF | Manchester City | 2020 | Australia | v Ecuador, 24 March 2023 |

== See also ==
- FA Cup
- U21 Premier League Cup
- Professional Development League
- Football League Youth Alliance
