= Gordon Bolland =

English footballer and manager

Personal information
- Full name: Gordon Edward Bolland
- Date of birth: 12 August 1943 (age 83)
- Place of birth: Boston, Lincolnshire, England
- Position: Striker

Youth career
- Boston United

Senior career*
Years	Team	Apps	(Gls)
1960–1962	Chelsea	2	(0)
1962–1964	Leyton Orient	63	(19)
1964–1968	Norwich City	105	(29)
1968–1969	Charlton Athletic	11	(2)
1969–1975	Millwall	244	(62)
1975–1977	Boston United	58	(11)

Managerial career
- 1976–1977: Boston United
- * Club domestic league appearances and goals

Gordon Edward Bolland (born 12 August 1943 in Boston, Lincolnshire) is an English retired footballer and manager.

A striker, Bolland joined Londoners Chelsea as a teenager, and was a member of the sides which won the FA Youth Cup in 1960 and 1961, alongside the likes of Peter Bonetti, Ron Harris, Terry Venables and Bobby Tambling. Despite this, he only made two appearances for the first team and was released in March 1962, after which he signed for Leyton Orient.

Bolland played for Orient during their only season in the English top flight, and scored 19 goals in 64 league games before joining Norwich City in 1964 for £31,500, where he scored 29 goals in 105 league matches. After a brief spell with Charlton Athletic, Bolland signed for Millwall for £10,000 in October 1968. Bolland proved to be a fast, skilful striker who could also drop into midfield to great effect. It was from this position that Bolland scored a spectacular goal against Bristol City on 16 October 1971 which won the Match Of The Day "Goal of the Month" award. In the 1972–73 season, Bolland scored 9 goals in seven consecutive league games. He remained with Millwall for seven years, scoring 62 goals in 244 games, and is an inductee of the club's Hall of Fame. He finished his career as player-manager of Boston United.
