= Harry Fallon =

Scottish footballer

Personal information
- Full name: Henry Fallon
- Date of birth: 26 April 1942 (age 84)
- Place of birth: Paisley, Renfrewshire, Scotland
- Height: 5 ft 11 in (1.80 m)
- Position: Goalkeeper

Senior career*
Years	Team	Apps	(Gls)
–1963	Neilston		
1963–1965	St Johnstone	31	(0)
1965–1968	York City	67	(0)
1968–	Corby Town		
Total		98	(0)
- * Club domestic league appearances and goals

Henry Fallon (born 28 April 1942) is a Scottish former professional footballer who played as a goalkeeper in the Scottish Football League for St Johnstone, in the Football League for York City, in Scottish junior football for Neilston and in non-League football for Corby Town.
