= Tabish Hussain =

Pakistan international footballer

Personal information
- Date of birth: 6 June 2001 (age 25)
- Place of birth: Bradford, England
- Height: 1.66 m (5 ft 5 in)
- Position: Winger

Team information
- Current team: Garforth Town

Youth career
- Eccleshill United
- 2017–2018: Guiseley

Senior career*
Years	Team	Apps	(Gls)
2018–2020	Guiseley	2	(0)
2019	→ Yorkshire Amateur (loan)		
2019	→ Eccleshill United (loan)	11	(4)
2020–2021	Bradford (Park Avenue)	4	(0)
2021–2022	Ossett United	16	(3)
2022–2023	Albion Sports		
2023–	Garforth Town	12	(2)

International career^{‡}
2019–	Pakistan	2	(0)
- * Club domestic league appearances and goals as of 17:10, 26 September 2022 (UTC) ‡ National team caps and goals as of 17:17, 12 June 2019 (UTC)

Tabish Hussain (born 6 June 2001) is a footballer who plays as a winger for Garforth Town. Born in England, he represents the Pakistan national team.

== Club career ==
Born in Bradford, Hussain spent time with the youth teams of both Eccleshill United and Guiseley, before making his senior debut for Guiseley in the 2018–19 season. On 21 September 2019 Hussain joined Yorkshire Amateur on loan until 9 October 2019. Five days after returning to Guiseley, Hussain was loaned out to his former youth club, Eccleshill United.

In September 2020 he moved to Bradford (Park Avenue). He signed for Ossett United in May 2021.

He moved to Albion Sports in June 2022, and to Garforth Town in June 2023.

== International career ==
In May 2019 he was called up by the Pakistan national team for a training camp. He made his national team debut on 6 June 2019 in a 2022 FIFA World Cup qualifier against Cambodia, as an 84th-minute substitute for Muhammad Ali.

In July 2022 he was selected to represent the Kashmir FA.
