= Thomas O'Donnell =

Thomas (or Tom) O'Donnell may refer to:

- Thomas O'Donnell (Irish nationalist politician) (1871–1943), Irish nationalist MP
- Thomas O'Donnell (Sinn Féin politician) (died 1945), Irish Sinn Féin represented Sligo-Mayo East in the 1920s
- Thomas A. O'Donnell (1870–1945), oil industrialist and builder of the O'Donnell Golf Club in Palm Springs, California
- Thomas E. O'Donnell (draft opponent) (1841–c. 1875), powerful force in New York draft riots
- Thomas E. O'Donnell (judge) (born 1954), Irish judge
- Thomas Joseph O'Donnell, recognized at the 1916 Birthday Honours
- Tom O'Donnell (cricketer) (born 1996), Australian cricketer
- Tom O'Donnell (physician) (1926–2014), New Zealand medical doctor
- Tom O'Donnell (politician) (1926–2020), Irish Fine Gael TD and MEP
