= 2020–21 FA Youth Cup =

Football Association Youth Cup

Tournament details
- Country: England; Wales

Final positions
- Champions: Aston Villa (4th Title)
- Runners-up: Liverpool (4th Runner Up Finish)

Tournament statistics
- Top goal scorer(s): (Austria) Carney Chukwuemeka Aston Villa (7 Goals)

The 2020–21 FA Youth Cup was the 69th edition of the FA Youth Cup. The defending champions were Manchester City, Aston Villa won the final 2–1 against Liverpool. This was their fourth time winning the tournament.

== First round ==
Date	Home Team	Score	Away Team	Venue
27 October 2020	Grimsby Town (4)	2-0	Scunthorpe United (4)	Blundell Park
28 October 2020	Blackpool (3)	2-3	Bradford City (4)	Bloomfield Road
28 October 2020	Bolton Wanderers (4)	1-2	Guiseley (6)	University of Bolton Stadium
28 October 2020	Oldham Athletic (4)	6-0	FC United of Manchester (7)	Boundary Park
2 November 2020	Chelmsford City (6)	3-1	St Albans City (6)	Melbourne Park
2 November 2020	Cheltenham Town (4)	4-0	Tuffley Rovers (9)	Johnny-rocks Stadium
3 November 2020	Wigan Athletic (3)	5-0	Harrogate Town (4)	DW Stadium
3 November 2020	Ossett United (8)	1-8	Sunderland (3)	Ingfield
3 November 2020	Dartford (6)	1-3	Metropolitan Police (7)	Prince's Park
3 November 2020	Dorking Wanderers (6)	1-0	Dover Athletic (5)	Meadowbank
3 November 2020	Portsmouth (3)	4-2	Didcot Town (8)	Fratton Park
3 November 2020	Gillingham (3)	7-1	Leatherhead (7)	Priesfield Stadium
3 November 2020	Ipswich Town (3)	4-1	Southend United (4)	Portman Road
4 November 2020	Salford City (4)	3-2	Rochdale (3)	Peninsula Stadium
4 November 2020	Fleetwood Town (3)	1-0	Accrington Stanley (3)	Highbury
4 November 2020	Crewe Alexandra (3)	0-2	Hull City (3)	Gresty Road
4 November 2020	Stevenage (4)	1-4	Colchester United (4)	Lamex Stadium
4 November 2020	Shrewsbury Town (3)	0-4	Walsall (4)	The New Meadow
4 November 2020	Northampton Town (3)	1-1 (10-11 pens)	Cambridge United (4)	PTS Academy Stadium
4 November 2020	Wimborne Town (7)	0-1	Newport County (3)	Cuthbury
4 November 2020	Plymouth Argyle (3)	2-3	Exeter City (4)	Home Park
4 November 2020	Eccleshill United (9)	1-3	Altrincham (5)	Mitton Group Stadium
4 November 2020	Carlisle United (4)	3-2	Chester (6)	Brunton Park
4 November 2020	Solihull Moors (5)	0-3	Lincoln City (3)	Sportnation.Bet Stadium
4 November 2020	Milton Keynes (3)	8-1	Hertford Town (8)	stadiumMK
4 November 2020	Newmarket Town (9)	2-7	Peterborough United (3)	Tristel Global Stadium
4 November 2020	Swindon Town (3)	2-2 (8-7 pens)	Forest Green Rovers (4)	County Ground
4 November 2020	Port Vale (4)	1-4	Basford United (7)	Vale Park
4 November 2020	Eastleigh (5)	3-4	Chippenham Town (6)	Silverlake Stadium
4 November 2020	Winslow United (10)	0-5	Charlton Athletic (3)	Elmfields Gate
4 November 2020	Coventry Sphinx (9)	1-2	Doncaster Rovers (3)	Ryona Engineering Supplies Stadium
4 November 2020	Brockenhurst (9)	2-1	Truro City (7)	Grigg Lane
7 November 2020	Morecambe (4)	1-4	AFC Fylde (6)	Mazuma Stadium
9 November 2020	Leyton Orient (4)	2-3	Woking (5)	Coles Park
11 November 2020	Oxford United (3)	1-2	AFC Wimbledon (3)	The ASM Stadium
7 December 2020	Bury Town (8)	0-7	AFC Sudbury (8)	Denny Bros Stadium
8 December 2020	Burton Albion (3)	4-1	Worcester City (9)	Pirelli Stadium
9 December 2020	Bristol Rovers (3)	2-3	Camberley Town (9)	Memorial Stadium
9 December 2020	Tranmere Rovers (4)	0-0 (8-7 pens)	Hyde United (8)	
10 December 2020	Bugbrooke St Michaels (10)	0-3	Mansfield Town (4)	Birds Close
11 December 2020	Eastbourne Borough (6)	1-0	K Sports (9)	Priory Lane
11 December 2020	Irlam (9)	0-6	Notts County (5)	RG3Digital Stadium
11 December 2020	Bromley (5)	2-1	Bedfont Sports Club (8)	Hayes Lane
	Crawley Town (4)	0-3*	Sutton United (5)	

*Crawley withdrew from the competition, granting Sutton a 3-0 walkover and entry to Round 2

== Second round ==
11 November 2020	Exeter City (4)	3-2	Cheltenham Town (4)	St James Park
13 November 2020	Fleetwood Town (3)	3-0	Walsall (4)	Highbury
17 November 2020	Cambridge United (4)	4-0	Guiseley (6)	Abbey Stadium
17 November 2020	Gillingham (3)	1-1 (8-9 pens)	Charlton Athletic (3)	Bauvill Stadium
18 November 2020	Hull City (3)	2-3	Doncaster Rovers (3)	KCom Stadium
18 November 2020	Oldham Athletic (4)	0-1	Lincoln City (3)	Boundary Park
18 November 2020	Chippenham Town (6)	0-7	Woking (5)	Hardenhuish Park
18 November 2020	Dorking Wanderers (6)	0-2	Colchester United (4)	Meadowbank
19 November 2020	Carlisle United (4)	3-1	Bradford City (4)	Brunton Park
20 November 2020	Altrincham (5)	1-2	Peterborough United (3)	Moss Lane
20 November 2020	AFC Fylde (6)	3-1	Sunderland (3)	Mill Farm
23 November 2020	Chelmsford City (6)	0-5	Ipswich Town (3)	Melbourne Park
16 December 2020	Portsmouth (3)	1-2	Bromley (5)	Fratton Park
18 December 2020	Wigan Athletic (3)	3-2	Notts County (5)	DW Stadium
18 December 2020	Salford City (4)	2-1	Tranmere Rovers (4)	Peninsula Stadium
19 December 2020	Milton Keynes Dons (3)	3-0	Eastbourne Borough (6)	stadiumMK
19 December 2020	Newport County (4)	3-2	Brockenhurst (9)	Rodney Parade
21 December 2020	Basford United (7)	1-0	Grimsby Town (4)	Greenwich Avenue
21 December 2020	Burton Albion (3)	3-2	Mansfield Town (4)	Pirelli Stadium
21 December 2020	Sutton United (5)	6-0	Camberley Town (9)	Gander Green Lane
21 December 2020	Metropolitan Police (7)	1-2	Swindon Town (3)	Imber Court
23 December 2020	AFC Sudbury (8)	1-2	AFC Wimbledon (3)	MEL Group Stadium

== Third round ==
28 November 2020	Chelsea	8-1	Barnsley (2)	Kingsmeadow
2 December 2020	Exeter City (4)	3-1	AFC Bournemouth (2)	St James Park
3 December 2020	Luton Town (2)	3-3 (2-4 pens)	West Ham United	Kenilworth Road
4 December 2020	Middlesbrough (2)	4-0	Millwall (2)	Heritage Park
4 December 2020	Derby County (2)	2-3	Cardiff City (2)	Pride Park
5 December 2020	Southampton	3-0	Coventry City (2)	St Mary's Stadium
7 December 2020	Nottingham Forest (2)	1-2	Bristol City (2)	City Ground
7 December 2020	Brighton & Hove Albion	5-1	Woking (5)	AMEX Elite Performance Centre
7 December 2020	Ipswich Town (3)	3-2	Fulham	Portman Road
8 December 2020	Swansea City (2)	2-1	Queens Park Rangers (2)	Landore
8 December 2020	Carlisle United (4)	0-1	Blackburn Rovers (2)	Brunton Park
9 December 2020	Watford (2)	2-0	Colchester United (4)	Clarence Park
11 December 2020	Fleetwood Town (3)	2-1	Crystal Palace	Highbury
11 December 2020	Reading (2)	3-4	Aston Villa	
15 December 2020	Huddersfield Town (2)	1-1 (3-5 pens)	Newcastle United	John Smith's Stadium
15 December 2020	Rotherham United (2)	1-2	Arsenal	AESSEAL New York Stadium
18 December 2020	Wolverhampton Wanderers	2-4	Norwich City (2)	St George's Park
6 January 2021	Preston North End (2)	0-1	Lincoln City (3)	Deepdale
12 January 2021	Tottenham Hotspur	6-2	Newport County (4)	Hotspur Way
12 January 2021	Swindon Town (3)	3-0	Bromley (5)	County Ground
5 March 2021	Leicester City	5-0	Sheffield Wednesday (2)	LCFC Training Ground
10 March 2021	Salford City (4)	0-2	Manchester United	Peninsula Stadium
12 March 2021	Stoke City	2-3	Burton Albion (3)	Clayton Wood
12 March 2021	Manchester City	6-1	Birmingham City (2)	City Football Academy
16 March 2021	Liverpool	6-0	Sutton United (5)	Kirkby Academy
17 March 2021	Charlton Athletic (3)	0-2	Sheffield United	Prince's Park
17 March 2021	Cambridge United (4)	2-3	AFC Fylde (6)	Newmarket Town Grounds
17 March 2021	Everton	4-2	Wigan Athletic (3)	Pure Stadium
17 March 2021	Basford United (7)	0-4	West Bromwich Albion	Greenwich Avenue
17 March 2021	Leeds United	8-2	Milton Keynes Dons (3)	LNER Community Stadium
18 March 2021	AFC Wimbledon (3)	1-0	Burnley	Plough Lane
19 March 2021	Peterborough United (3)	2-1	Doncaster Rovers (3)	Weston Homes Stadium

== Fourth round ==
19 March 2021	Lincoln City (3)	2-3	Watford (2)	LNER Stadium
20 March 2021	Blackburn Rovers (2)	1-4	Arsenal	Ewood Park
22 March 2021	Fleetwood Town (3)	1-1 (2-4 pens)	Bristol City (2)	Highbury
22 March 2021	Norwich City (2)	0-5	West Ham United	Carrow Road
23 March 2021	Exeter City (4)	1-2	Leicester City	St James Park
23 March 2021	Southampton	0-1	Burton Albion (3)	St Mary's Stadium
24 March 2021	Aston Villa	3-0	Brighton & Hove Albion	Villa Park
27 March 2021	Ipswich Town (3)	3-1	Swindon Town (3)	Portman Road
31 March 2021	West Bromwich Albion	2-1	Cardiff City (2)	The Hawthorns
31 March 2021	AFC Wimbledon (3)	0-3	Tottenham Hotspur	Plough Lane
2 April 2021	Swansea City (2)	0-1	Middlesbrough (2)	Landore
2 April 2021	Chelsea	2-0	AFC Fylde (6)	Kingsmeadow
3 April 2021	Peterborough United (3)	0-2	Sheffield United	Bramall Lane
3 April 2021	Newcastle United	4-1	Leeds United	Whitley Park
3 April 2021	Manchester City	0-1	Everton	City Academy Stadium
3 April 2021	Manchester United	0-1	Liverpool	Leigh Sports Village

== Fifth round ==
10 April 2021	Middlesbrough (2)	0-1	Ipswich Town (3)	Heritage Park
11 April 2021	Newcastle United	3-2	Watford (2)	St James's Park
13 April 2021	Tottenham Hotspur	0-5	West Bromwich Albion	Hotspur Way
14 April 2021	Aston Villa	9-0	Burton Albion (3)	Villa Park
15 April 2021	Chelsea	1-2	Everton	Kingsmeadow
16 April 2021	West Ham United	1-3	Arsenal	Rush Green
16 April 2021	Leicester City	1-5	Liverpool	LCFC Training Ground
17 April 2021	Sheffield United	3-1	Bristol City (2)	Bramall Lane

== Quarter finals ==
27 April 2021	Newcastle United	1-6	Aston Villa	St James's Park
27 April 2021	West Bromwich Albion	2-1	Everton	The Hawthorns
30 April 2021	Liverpool	3-1	Arsenal	Anfield
30 April 2021	Ipswich Town (3)	3-2	Sheffield United	Portman Road

== Semi finals ==
12 May 2021

Ipswich Town (3)	1-2	Liverpool
Agbaje 45+1'		Musialowski 63'; Frauendorf 81'

Portman Road, Ipswich
Attendance: Behind Closed Doors
14 May 2021

Aston Villa	4-1	West Bromwich Albion
Chukwuemeka 10'; Barry 22'; Ingram 60' (o.g.); Young 78'		Swinkels 14' (o.g.)

Villa Park, Aston

== Final ==
24 May 2021

Aston Villa	2-1	Liverpool
Chrisene 7'; Young 17'	Report	Frauendorf 73'

Villa Park, Aston
Attendance: 4,406

== See also ==
- 2019–20 FA Cup
