= 2012–13 FA Youth Cup =

Tournament details
- Teams: 479

Final positions
- Champions: Norwich City (2nd Title)
- Runners-up: Chelsea (3rd Runner Up Finish)

The 2012–13 FA Youth Cup was the 61st edition of the FA Youth Cup.

The competition consisted of several rounds and was preceded by a qualifying competition, starting with the preliminary round which is followed by 3 qualifying rounds for non-League teams. Football League teams enter the draw thereafter, with League One and League Two teams entered at the first round, and Premier League and Championship teams entered in the third round.

== Calendar ==
Round	matches played from	matches	Clubs
Preliminary round	3 September 2012	112	460 → 348
First round qualifying	17 September 2012	128	348 → 220
Second round qualifying	1 October 2012	64	220 → 156
Third round qualifying	15 October 2012	32	156 → 124
First round	3 November 2012	40	124 → 84
Second round	17 November 2012	20	84 → 64
Third round	15 December 2012	32	64 → 32
Fourth round	19 January 2013	16	32 → 16
Fifth round	9 February 2013	8	16 → 8
Quarter-finals	23 February 2013	4	8 → 4
Semi-finals (two legs)	16 March & 30 March 2013	4	4 → 2
Final (two legs)	29 April & 13 May 2013	2	2 → 1

== Qualifying rounds ==
=== Preliminary round ===
Tie no	Home team	Score	Away team	Attendance
1	Pickering Town	1–5	Gateshead	39
2	Nantwich Town	3–9	Runcorn Linnets	93
3	Altrincham	1–2	Macclesfield Town	230
4	Marine	2–4	Stalybridge Celtic	115
5	Salford City	2–3	Vauxhall Motors	52
6	Ashton Town	1–0	Southport	40
7	North Ferriby United	1–2	Hall Road Rangers	90
8	Grimsby Town	9–1	Pontefract Collieries	50
9	Harrogate Town	5–2	Ossett Albion	90
10	Lutterworth Athletic	0–9	Lincoln City	40
11	Glossop North End	0–3	Mansfield Town	95
12	Spalding United	0–10	Oadby Town	50
13	Buxton	2–1	Ibstock United	49
14	Retford United	1–2	Holwell Sports	88
15	Teversal	2–4	Blaby & Whetstone Athletic	49
16	Boldmere St Michaels	w/o	Coventry Copsewood	N/A
Walkover for Boldmere St Michaels – Coventry Copsewood withdrawn.
17	Stratford Town	2–3	Newcastle Town	86
18	Walsall Wood	2–1	Lye Town	48
19	Earlswood Town	1–2	Solihull Moors	28
20	Hednesford Town	1–2	Hereford United	54
21	Cradley Town	2–4	Atherstone Town	29
22	Highgate United	1–4	Chasetown	40
23	Halesowen Town	2–5	Rugby Town	32
24	Nuneaton Griff	4–0	Racing Club Warwick	68
25	Eccleshall	1–4	Gornal Athletic	48
26	Pegasus Juniors	4–0	Stone Dominoes	36
27	Stowmarket Town	0–13	Cambridge United	55
28	Needham Market	5–1	Fakenham Town	85
29	Bury Town	9–0	Swaffham Town	66
30	Cornard United	3–0	Norwich United	30
31	AFC Kempston Rovers	2–1	AFC Dunstable	59
32	Bedford Town	2–1 †	Stewarts & Lloyds Corby	44
33	Peterborough Northern Star	3–1	Rushden & Higham United	50
34	Southend Manor	4–1	Kings Langley	50
35	Halstead Town	1–3	Hoddesdon Town	35
36	Wivenhoe Town	0–3	Heybridge Swifts	42
37	Ilford	w/o	Canvey Island	N/A
Walkover for Canvey Island – Ilford withdrawn.
38	Concord Rangers	2–5	Redbridge	71
39	Burnham Ramblers	w/o	Berkhamsted	N/A
Walkover for Berkhamsted – Burnham Ramblers withdrawn.
40	Thurrock	1–0	Witham Town	95
41	Oxhey Jets	7–0	Hullbridge Sports	37
42	Cheshunt	0–0 †	Barking	75
Cheshunt advance 6–5 on penalties.
43	East Thurrock United	0–2	Billericay Town	104
44	Hitchin Town	2–4	Tilbury	54
45	St Albans City	4–2	Romford	79
46	Sawbridgeworth Town	4–1 †	Leverstock Green	49
47	Colney Heath	2–1	FC Clacton	34
48	Chelmsford City	3–0	Waltham Abbey	66
49	Bowers & Pitsea	1–6	Boreham Wood	40
50	Potters Bar Town	2–0	St Margaretsbury	51
51	Bishop's Stortford	2–0	Ware	64
52	AFC Hornchurch	0–6	Brentwood Town	97
53	Clapton	w/o	Stansted	N/A
Walkover for Clapton – Stansted withdrawn.
54	Hatfield Town	0–5	Royston Town	
55	Hampton & Richmond Borough	1–4 †	Uxbridge	64
56	Hanworth Villa	3–1	North Greenford United	20

Tie no	Home team	Score	Away team	Attendance
57	Northwood	1–1 †	Harefield United	
Northwood advance 8–7 on penalties.
58	Wingate & Finchley	12–1	Bedfont Sports	52
59	Tonbridge Angels	1–2	South Park	47
60	Maidstone United	13–0	Redhill	127
61	Thamesmead Town	2–2 †	Margate	35
Thamesmead Town advance 6–5 on penalties.
62	Sevenoaks Town	4–3 †	Dover Athletic	46
63	Erith & Belvedere	2–0	Saltdean United	107
64	Dartford	1–2	Welling United	
65	Dulwich Hamlet	6–0	Metropolitan Police	78
66	Tooting & Mitcham United	1–0	Ramsgate	68
67	Colliers Wood United	3–1	St Francis Rangers	30
68	Faversham Town	5–2	Bromley	52
69	Westfield	0–3	Erith Town	44
70	Eastbourne Borough	2–1	Sittingbourne	110
71	Hastings United	1–5	Sutton United	94
72	Horley Town	2–5	Folkestone Invicta	36
73	Ebbsfleet United	6–7 †	Fisher	88
74	Corinthian	2–1	Chipstead	52
75	Molesey	2–1	Three Bridges	32
76	Carshalton Athletic	5–4	Lewes	57
77	Ashford United	0–4	Cray Wanderers	30
78	Eastbourne Town	2–6	VCD Athletic	60
79	Kingstonian	1–7	Crowborough Athletic	53
80	Shoreham	0–6	Leatherhead	31
81	Godalming Town	3–1	Walton & Hersham	71
82	Farnham Town	5–2	Lancing	20
83	Horsham	1–4	Burgess Hill Town	50
84	Dorking	2–1	Crawley Down Gatwick	61
85	Aylesbury	5–2 †	Binfield	
86	Cove	3–11	Oxford City	
87	Witney Town	w/o	Newport Pagnell Town	N/A
Walkover for Newport Pagnell Town – Witney Town withdrawn.
88	Farnborough	2–1	Hartley Wintney	72
89	Chesham United	0–1	Windsor	53
90	Maidenhead United	2–0	Fleet Spurs	
91	Burnham	4–7 †	Ascot United	60
92	Marlow	1–3	Banbury United	45
93	Flackwell Heath	2–5	Thatcham Town	36
94	Reading Town	8–0	Sandhurst Town	38
95	North Leigh	2–4	Didcot Town	38
96	Fleet Town	1–1 †	Thame United	46
Thame United advance 3–0 on penalties.
97	Bournemouth	2–1	AFC Portchester	57
98	Chippenham Town	1–0	Gillingham Town	43
99	Salisbury City	5–0	Moneyfields	56
100	Sholing	2–0	Dorchester Town	55
101	Elmore	0–3	Tiverton Town	
102	Chard Town	3–0	Taunton Town	
103	Weston Super Mare	4–1	Gloucester City	75
104	Frome Town	1–5	Odd Down	52
105	Bristol Academy	1–0	Bishop Sutton	35
106	Cirencester Town	3–2	Hengrove Athletic	63
107	Barnstaple Town	w/o	Paulton Rovers	N/A
Walkover for Paulton Rovers – Barnstaple Town withdrawn.
108	Forest Green Rovers	3–1	Bishop's Cleeve	106
109	Cheltenham Saracens	1–2	Bath City	30
110	Lydney Town	1–2	Mangotsfield United	72
111	Radstock Town	1–3	Bristol Manor Farm	42
112	Larkhall Athletic	2–3 †	Wells City	41

† – After extra time

=== First qualifying round ===
Tie no	Home team	Score	Away team	Attendance
1	Chester-le-Street Town	0–1 †	Bedlington Terriers	63
2	Gateshead	8–1	Ryton & Crawcrook Albion	137
3	Newton Aycliffe	4–1	Whitley Bay	56
4	Birtley Town	3–0	Scarborough Athletic	66
5	Bootle	1–4 †	Macclesfield Town	111
6	Prescot Cables	0–1	Curzon Ashton	90
7	Stockport Sports	w/o	Vauxhall Motors	N/A
Walkover for Vauxhall Motors – Stockport Sports withdrawn.
8	Skelmersdale United	0–1	AFC Blackpool	92
9	AFC Fylde	0–3	Padiham	55
10	Warrington Town	2–4	Wrexham	142
11	Lancaster City	2–0	Stalybridge Celtic	41
12	Ashton Town	1–3	Ashton Athletic	114
13	Runcorn Linnets	3–1	Northwich Victoria	120
14	Burscough	1–2	Chester	71
15	Goole	0–4	Grimsby Town	
16	Liversedge	1–3	Thackley	45
17	Staveley	2–4	Bottesford Town	59
18	Silsden	2–1	Stocksbridge Park Steels	43
19	Worksop Town	2–4	FC Halifax Town	56
20	Sheffield	1–2	Yorkshire Amateur	43
21	Farsley	1–6	Harrogate Town	75
22	Dinnington Town	w/o	Brighouse Town	N/A
Walkover for Brighouse Town – Dinnington Town withdrawn.
23	Hall Road Rangers	4–1	Kinsley Boys	55
24	Guiseley	5–3	Hallam	90
25	Lincoln United	0–6	Boston United	89
26	Blaby & Whetstone Athletic	1–6	Lincoln City	30
27	Arnold Town	2–2 †	Buxton	
Buxton advance 4–2 on penalties.
28	New Mills	2–0	Holwell Sports	75
29	Dunkirk	2–1	Oadby Town	40
30	Mansfield Town	6–0	Gresley	163
31	St Andrews	0–1	Matlock Town	36
32	Ilkeston	1–0	Hinckley United	85
33	Redditch United	0–1	Newcastle Town	19
34	Southam United	1–6	Kidderminster Harriers	109
35	Rugby Town	2–0	Ellesmere Rangers	50
36	Stourbridge	4–2	Nuneaton Griff	64
37	Gornal Athletic	0–9	Coleshill Town	
38	Chasetown	6–0	Malvern Town	60
39	Coventry Sphinx	1–5	Walsall Wood	65
40	Solihull Moors	1–3	Pegasus Juniors	51
41	Boldmere St Michaels	0–2	Atherstone Town	45
42	Romulus	0–6	Hereford United	32
43	Ipswich Wanderers	2–3	Needham Market	100
44	Lowestoft Town	2–1	Walsham Le Willows	52
45	Wroxham	4–1	Cornard United	86
46	Newmarket Town	2–3	Sudbury	45
47	Brantham Athletic	0–4	Haverhill Rovers	33
48	Diss Town	1–7	Woodbridge Town	77
49	Hadleigh United	1–12	Bury Town	44
50	Histon	7–1	Felixstowe & Walton United	72
51	Cambridge United	3–0	Dereham Town	68
52	Leiston	1–3	Soham Town Rangers	40
53	Daventry Town	1–5	Bedford Town	30
54	Rothwell Corinthians	5–2	Wellingborough Whitworths	35
55	St Ives Town	3–3 †	Barton Rovers	53
Barton Rovers advance 4–2 on penalties.
56	Thrapston Town	1–10	St Neots Town	26
57	Yaxley	4–3	Corby Town	40
58	Stotfold	2–0	Woodford United	44
59	Cogenhoe United	0–3	Peterborough Northern Star	43
60	Langford	2–0	Brackley Town	46
61	AFC Kempston Rovers	0–4	Luton Town	
62	Kettering Town	1–1 †	Leighton Town	41
Leighton Town advance 3–1 on penalties.
63	Southend Manor	3–2 †	Grays Athletic	
64	Hemel Hempstead Town	2–3	Redbridge	71

Tie no	Home team	Score	Away team	Attendance
65	Canvey Island	4–0	Royston Town	72
66	Oxhey Jets	1–1 †	Billericay Town	60
Billericay Town advance 6–5 on penalties.
67	Berkhamsted	5–2	Sawbridgeworth Town	50
68	Tilbury	0–6	Boreham Wood	74
69	Brentwood Town	6–0	Stanway Rovers	35
70	Bishop's Stortford	5–2	Heybridge Swifts	65
71	Chelmsford City	0–1	Hoddesdon Town	74
72	Clapton	4–4 †	Colney Heath	19
Colney Heath advance 5–3 on penalties.
73	Thurrock	2–1	Potters Bar Town	104
74	Cheshunt	3–1	St Albans City	113
75	Hanwell Town	0–4	Wealdstone	49
76	Staines Town	3–0	Cockfosters	33
77	Hayes & Yeading United	0–1	Ashford Town (Middx)	56
78	Uxbridge	2–1	Wingate & Finchley	68
79	Northwood	4–0	Hanworth Villa	51
80	Enfield 1983	2–1	Enfield Town	59
81	South Park	4–3	Lordswood	54
82	Lingfield	5–4	Erith & Belvedere	61
83	Sevenoaks Town	2–0	Crowborough Athletic	111
84	Tooting & Mitcham United	1–3	Faversham Town	46
85	Welling United	3–3 †	Sutton United	84
Welling United advance 5–4 on penalties.
86	Erith Town	2–3	Corinthian	64
87	Cray Wanderers	1–0	Whitstable Town	
88	Carshalton Athletic	6–0	Thamesmead Town	28
89	Fisher	2–4	Maidstone United	84
90	VCD Athletic	10–0	Folkestone Invicta	68
91	Dulwich Hamlet	6–1	Molesey	48
92	Colliers Wood United	4–1	Eastbourne Borough	60
93	Worthing	3–1	Chichester City	72
94	Camberley Town	1–0	Leatherhead	65
95	Pagham	1–8	Burgess Hill Town	72
96	Woking	7–0	Dorking	71
97	Horsham YMCA	w/o	Farnham Town	N/A
Walkover for Farnham Town – Horsham YMCA withdrawn.
98	Godalming Town	0–3	Cobham	67
99	Bognor Regis Town	5–4	Whyteleafe	176
100	Guildford City	0–1	Arundel	36
101	Shrivenham	3–4	Oxford City	68
102	Alton Town	6–4 †	Ardley United	
Original Match abandoned after 56 minutes due to a serious injury, score was 1–0.
103	Thatcham Town	2–5	Farnborough	
104	Basingstoke Town	2–1 †	Reading Town	123
105	Didcot Town	11–0	Chalfont St Peter	53
106	Banbury United	2–1	Kidlington	32
107	Bracknell Town	2–5	Newport Pagnell Town	
108	Windsor	6–0	Thame United	47
109	Aylesbury	3–1 †	Ascot United	64
110	Slough Town	0–6	Maidenhead United	
111	Petersfield Town	1–7	Eastleigh	63
112	Poole Town	3–0	AFC Bournemouth	71
113	Ringwood Town	w/o	Sholing	N/A
Walkover for Sholing – Ringwood Town withdrawn.
114	AFC Totton	10–2	Hamworthy United	94
115	Havant & Waterlooville	4–2	Salisbury City	69
116	Chippenham Town	2–1	Sherborne Town	45
117	Christchurch	5–3	Wimborne Town	109
118	Weymouth	1–4	Bemerton Heath Harlequins	71
119	Yate Town	0–7	Chard Town	42
120	Bridgwater Town	1–2	Merthyr Town	59
121	Bath City	3–0	Odd Down	134
122	Brislington	1–2	Mangotsfield United	19
123	Bristol Manor Farm	3–2	Bitton	46
124	Forest Green Rovers	3–1	Newport County	112
125	Almondsbury UWE	2–5	Weston Super Mare	
126	Bristol Academy	2–0	Wells City	45
127	Tiverton Town	7–0	Paulton Rovers	33
128	Ashton & Backwell United	0–4	Cirencester Town	56

† – After extra time

=== Second qualifying round ===
Tie no	Home team	Score	Away team	Attendance
1	Bedlington Terriers	1–0	Birtley Town	57
2	Gateshead	5–2	Newton Aycliffe	
3	Vauxhall Motors	3–2	Curzon Ashton	84
4	Runcorn Linnets	0–0 †	Lancaster City	141
Runcorn Linnets advance 5–4 on penalties.
5	Macclesfield Town	1–4	Wrexham	102
6	Padiham	2–3	AFC Blackpool	62
7	Chester	5–2 †	Ashton Athletic	121
8	Bottesford Town	5–1	Thackley	67
9	Hall Road Rangers	2–0	Harrogate Town	68
10	Grimsby Town	6–0	Yorkshire Amateur	
11	FC Halifax Town	0–0 †	Silsden	53
Halifax Town advance 7–6 on penalties.
12	Guiseley	0–2	Brighouse Town	98
13	Buxton	1–2	Matlock Town	79
14	Boston United	2–3	Dunkirk	174
15	New Mills	1–5	Ilkeston	93
16	Lincoln City	8–1	Mansfield Town	
17	Rugby Town	0–2	Kidderminster Harriers	70
18	Atherstone Town	3–0	Walsall Wood	50
19	Newcastle Town	0–4	Chasetown	89
20	Coleshill Town	0–1	Stourbridge	52
21	Hereford United	3–1	Pegasus Juniors	
22	Wroxham	6–0	Lowestoft Town	65
23	Cambridge United	1–3	Bury Town	116
24	Needham Market	4–2	Woodbridge Town	135
25	Haverhill Rovers	0–2	Sudbury	52
26	Soham Town Rangers	0–7	Histon	122
27	Barton Rovers	7–2	Rothwell Corinthians	
28	Luton Town	6–0	Peterborough Northern Star	119
29	Bedford Town	1–2 †	Stotfold	52
30	Yaxley	3–2	St Neots Town	65
31	Leighton Town	1–3	Langford	61
32	Hoddesdon Town	4–2 †	Colney Heath	45

Tie no	Home team	Score	Away team	Attendance
33	Cheshunt	2–0	Berkhamsted	80
34	Thurrock	0–2	Boreham Wood	75
35	Southend Manor	1–4	Billericay Town	55
36	Canvey Island	3–2	Redbridge	101
37	Brentwood Town	2–0	Bishop's Stortford	50
38	Staines Town	4–2	Uxbridge	
39	Wealdstone	0–2	Enfield 1983	55
40	Northwood	0–1	Ashford Town (Middx)	52
41	Maidstone United	3–2	VCD Athletic	133
42	Colliers Wood United	2–6	Welling United	40
43	Dulwich Hamlet	5–3 †	Corinthian	71
44	South Park	4–4 †	Faversham Town	
Faversham Town advance 5–4 on penalties.
45	Sevenoaks Town	4–1	Lingfield	47
46	Cray Wanderers	0–4	Carshalton Athletic	41
47	Burgess Hill Town	2–7	Bognor Regis Town	41
48	Worthing	3–0	Farnham Town	52
49	Woking	3–0	Arundel	51
50	Camberley Town	4–1	Cobham	50
51	Farnborough	3–2 †	Alton Town	81
52	Aylesbury	4–2	Newport Pagnell Town	72
53	Oxford City	4–1	Banbury United	
54	Didcot Town	6–0	Basingstoke Town	76
55	Maidenhead United	4–0	Windsor	30
56	Sholing	2–0	Christchurch	74
57	Eastleigh	4–4 †	Havant & Waterlooville	
Havant & Waterlooville advance 4–3 on penalties.
58	AFC Totton	4–2	Bemerton Heath Harlequins	86
59	Poole Town	0–3	Chippenham Town	67
60	Bath City	2–0	Merthyr Town	59
61	Tiverton Town	3–0	Weston Super Mare	48
62	Chard Town	1–3	Forest Green Rovers	
63	Bristol Manor Farm	1–6	Mangotsfield United	44
64	Cirencester Town	4–0	Bristol Academy	36

† – After extra time

=== Third qualifying round ===
Tie no	Home team	Score	Away team	Attendance
1	FC Halifax Town	1–0	Bedlington Terriers	45
2	Runcorn Linnets	0–3	Chester	168
3	Gateshead	3–1	Wrexham	130
4	Vauxhall Motors	0–4	Grimsby Town	114
5	AFC Blackpool	0–4	Bottesford Town	31
6	Brighouse Town	4–1	Hall Road Rangers	77
7	Dunkirk	5–0	Yaxley	51
8	Matlock Town	0–4	Kidderminster Harriers	110
9	Hereford United	3–0	Atherstone Town	
10	Chasetown	1–2	Stourbridge	62
11	Ilkeston	1–4	Lincoln City	107
12	Cheshunt	0–2	Histon	
13	Luton Town	3–1	Barton Rovers	226
14	Brentwood Town	2–0	Sudbury	30
15	Hoddesdon Town	1–0	Langford	14
16	Wroxham	2–0	Needham Market	93

Tie no	Home team	Score	Away team	Attendance
17	Stotfold	2–1	Billericay Town	60
18	Enfield 1983	0–1	Bury Town	54
19	Staines Town	3–1	Ashford Town (Middx)	124
20	Canvey Island	2–1	Boreham Wood	101
21	Farnborough	3–4 †	Maidstone United	79
22	Faversham Town	4–2	Bognor Regis Town	88
23	Welling United	2–3 †	Sevenoaks Town	92
24	Dulwich Hamlet	0–2	Camberley Town	83
25	Carshalton Athletic	4–2	Worthing	64
26	Aylesbury	0–2	Woking	66
27	Mangotsfield United	3–2	Oxford City	65
28	Sholing	2–0	Chippenham Town	49
29	Didcot Town	3–0	Havant & Waterlooville	101
30	Maidenhead United	2–1	Forest Green Rovers	82
31	AFC Totton	2–1 †	Bath City	151
32	Cirencester Town	7–1	Tiverton Town	79

† – After extra time

== First round proper ==
Tie no	Home team	Score	Away team	Attendance
1	Gateshead	1–1 †	Preston North End	133
Gateshead advance 4–1 on penalties.
2	Chester	0–3	York City	163
3	Doncaster Rovers	1–0	Morecambe	208
4	Oldham Athletic	2–0	Accrington Stanley	200
5	Bottesford Town	1–0	Brighouse Town	110
6	Tranmere Rovers	0–2	Bury	241
7	FC Halifax Town	1–3	Scunthorpe United	52
8	Crewe Alexandra	2–1	Carlisle United	370
9	Rochdale	2–1	Rotherham United	251
10	Bradford City	2–0	Grimsby Town	187
11	Hartlepool United	1–1 †	Fleetwood Town	100
Hartlepool United advance 5–3 on penalties.
12	Hereford United	0–5	MK Dons	89
13	Lincoln City	3–2	Notts County	197
14	Stevenage	3–0	Luton Town	478
15	Coventry City	4–3	Shrewsbury Town	396
16	Chesterfield	0–3	Northampton Town	150
17	Port Vale	1–0	Walsall	173
18	Burton Albion	2–1	Kidderminster Harriers	125
19	Dunkirk	1–4	Stourbridge	91
20	Bury Town	1–4	Histon	125

Tie no	Home team	Score	Away team	Attendance
21	Colchester United	13–1	Camberley Town	186
22	Carshalton Athletic	1–3	Woking	121
23	AFC Wimbledon	2–0	Farnborough	220
24	Portsmouth	2–1	Southend United	673
25	Hoddesdon Town	0–3	Canvey Island	109
26	Brentford	5–1	Barnet	248
27	Faversham Town	4–2	Sevenoaks Town	114
28	Staines Town	4–2	Wroxham	81
29	Brentwood Town	2–0	Gillingham	160
30	Crawley Town	3–2	Dagenham & Redbridge	232
31	Stotfold	1–7	Leyton Orient	192
32	Bristol Rovers	2–1	Torquay United	185
33	Oxford United	4–2	Yeovil Town	159
34	AFC Bournemouth	1–1	AFC Totton	506
AFC Totton advance 11–10 on penalties.
35	Didcot Town	0–6	Aldershot Town	224
36	Plymouth Argyle	3–0	Exeter City	748
37	Cirencester Town	5–2	Mangotsfield United	57
38	Swindon Town	6–1	Sholing	190
39	Cheltenham Town	8–0	Maidenhead United	170
40	Sheffield United	w/o	Wycombe Wanderers	N/A
Bye for Sheffield United.

† – After extra time

== Second round proper ==
Tie no	Home team	Score	Away team	Attendance
1	Stourbridge	2–2	Bradford City	437
Bradford City advance 5–3 on penalties.
2	Oldham Athletic	0–2	Coventry City	183
3	MK Dons	2–6	Stevenage	315
4	Crewe Alexandra	5–3	Scunthorpe United	584
5	Burton Albion	5–0	Bottesford Town	246
6	Rochdale	2–1	Sheffield United	260
7	Lincoln City	1–3	Hartlepool United	132
8	Doncaster Rovers	1–2	Gateshead	298
9	Bury	1–2	Port Vale	262
10	Northampton Town	5–0	York City	241

Tie no	Home team	Score	Away team	Attendance
11	Swindon Town	6–1	Cirencester Town	527
12	Crawley Town	2–4	Histon	192
13	Leyton Orient	2–3	Aldershot Town	445
14	Portsmouth	2–1	Woking	561
15	AFC Wimbledon	2–5 †	Cheltenham Town	272
16	Brentford	3–2	Brentwood Town	255
17	Colchester United	8–1	Faversham Town	187
18	AFC Totton	1–2	Canvey Island	303
19	Bristol Rovers	3–0	Staines Town	178
20	Oxford United	3–2	Plymouth Argyle	214

† – After extra time

== Third round proper ==
Tie no	Home team	Score	Away team	Attendance
1	Stevenage	2–1	Wigan Athletic	342
2	Arsenal	3–0	Newcastle United	420
3	Manchester United	3–4 †	Burnley	3,146
4	Coventry City	0–1	Bristol Rovers	150
5	Hull City	3–2 †	Swansea City	143
6	Birmingham City	3–1	West Bromwich Albion	494
7	Swindon Town	0–5	Liverpool	1,533
8	Fulham	6–4 †	Middlesbrough	112
9	Barnsley	3–1	Oxford United	247
10	Cheltenham Town	0–1	Tottenham Hotspur	771
11	Crystal Palace	0–2	Port Vale	537
12	Burton Albion	2–1	Sheffield Wednesday	332
13	Northampton Town	2–1	Canvey Island	185
14	Brentford	1–5	Reading	346
15	Derby County	4–0	Gateshead	385
16	Norwich City	1–0	Queens Park Rangers	209

Tie no	Home team	Score	Away team	Attendance
17	Rochdale	3–2 †	Crewe Alexandra	205
18	Millwall	4–3	Blackpool	296
19	Colchester United	2–3	Chelsea	1,043
20	Southampton	0–2	Everton	524
21	Wolverhampton Wanderers	0–1	Charlton Athletic	306
22	Brighton & Hove Albion	0–4	Stoke City	651
23	Hartlepool United	0–3	Huddersfield Town	180
24	Aldershot Town	1–3	West Ham United	713
25	Peterborough United	4–0	Aston Villa	879
26	Bolton Wanderers	2–1	Portsmouth	573
27	Blackburn Rovers	1–3	Leicester City	349
28	Bradford City	2–2	Histon	150
Histon advance 4–2 on penalties.
29	Watford	0–4	Leeds United	535
30	Manchester City	3–1	Sunderland	382
31	Bristol City	0–1	Ipswich Town	235
32	Nottingham Forest	2–1	Cardiff City	382

† – After extra time

== Fourth round proper ==
Tie no	Home team	Score	Away team	Attendance
1	Port Vale	2–3†	Everton	525
2	Norwich City	2–1	Millwall	277
3	Barnsley	4–3	Stevenage	412
4	Reading	0–2	Bolton Wanderers	495
5	Derby County	3–2	Ipswich Town	436
6	West Ham United	2–5	Tottenham Hotspur	1,189
7	Stoke City	2–3	Huddersfield Town	809
8	Arsenal	2–1†	Fulham	414

Tie no	Home team	Score	Away team	Attendance
9	Manchester City	2–0	Burnley	2,570
10	Histon	0–4	Liverpool	1,596
11	Charlton Athletic	2–3†	Chelsea	1,452
12	Northampton Town	0–1	Hull City	514
13	Birmingham City	1–0	Bristol Rovers	240
14	Leicester City	4–1	Peterborough United	758
15	Leeds United	6–1	Burton Albion	489
16	Nottingham Forest	2–1	Rochdale	369

† – After extra time

== Fifth round proper ==
Tie no	Home team	Score	Away team	Attendance
1	Chelsea	3–0	Barnsley	402
2	Hull City	3–1†	Leicester City	271
3	Derby County	2–0	Manchester City	1,256
4	Nottingham Forest	3–2	Huddersfield Town	546

Tie no	Home team	Score	Away team	Attendance
5	Norwich City	2–1†	Birmingham City	384
6	Tottenham Hotspur	4–8	Bolton Wanderers	1,382
7	Arsenal	2–4	Everton	726
8	Liverpool	3–1	Leeds United	1,237

† – After extra time

== Quarter-finals ==
Tie no	Home team	Score	Away team	Attendance
1	Hull City	0–3	Liverpool	1,636
2	Everton	2–4	Norwich City	1,093
3	Nottingham Forest	3–2†	Bolton Wanderers	901
4	Derby County	1–2	Chelsea	4,188

† – After extra time

== Semi-finals ==
Team 1	Agg.	Team 2	1st leg	2nd leg
Liverpool	1–4	Chelsea	0–2	2 – 1
Nottingham Forest	1–1p	Norwich City	0–1	0 – 1

=== First leg ===
10 April 2013
19:45

Nottingham Forest	0–1	Norwich City
	Report	Hall-Johnson 88'

The City Ground, Nottingham
Attendance: 2,078
Referee: Geoff Eltringham

12 April 2013
19:45

Liverpool	0–2	Chelsea
	Report	Kiwomya 89', 91'

Anfield, Liverpool
Attendance: 3,527

=== Second leg ===
16 April 2013
19:45

Norwich City	0–1 (5 – 4)	Nottingham Forest
	Report	Palmer-Samuels 11'

Carrow Road
Attendance: 9,690
Referee: Stuart Atwell

19 April 2013
19:00

Chelsea	2–1	Liverpool
Swift 40'; Aké 44'	Report	Peterson 13'

Stamford Bridge
Attendance: 4,130

== Final ==
=== First leg ===
29 April 2013
19:45 BST

Norwich City	1–0	Chelsea
McGeehan 90' (pen.)	Report

Carrow Road, Norwich
Attendance: 21,595
Referee: Neil Swarbrick

=== Second leg ===
13 May 2013
19:45

Chelsea	2–3	Norwich City
Boga 15', 88'	Report	Nditi 21' (o.g.); McGeehan 36' (pen.); Josh Murphy 77'

Stamford Bridge, London
Attendance: 17,676
Referee: Neil Swarbrick

== See also ==
- 2012–13 Professional Development League 1
- 2012–13 FA Cup
- 2012–13 in English football
