= 2015–16 FA Youth Cup =

Tournament details
- Teams: 495

Final positions
- Champions: Chelsea (7th Title)
- Runners-up: Manchester City (6th Runner Up Finish)

Tournament statistics
- Top goal scorer: (England) Bassala Sambou Coventry City (9 Goals)

The 2015–16 FA Youth Cup was the 64th edition of the FA Youth Cup. Chelsea won the competition for the third year in a row.

== Calendar ==
Round	Matches played from	Matches	Clubs	New entries
Preliminary round	3 September 2015	133	495 → 362	266
First round qualifying	21 September 2015	136	362 → 226	139
Second round qualifying	5 October 2015	68	226 → 158	
Third round qualifying	19 October 2015	34	158 → 124	
First round	7 November 2015	40	124 → 84	46
Second round	21 November 2015	20	84 → 64	
Third round	19 December 2015	32	64 → 32	44
Fourth round	16 January 2016	16	32 → 16	
Fifth round	6 February 2016	8	16 → 8	
Quarter-finals	27 February 2016	4	8 → 2	
Semi-finals (two legs)	18 March 2016/ 8 April 2016	4	4 → 2	
Final (two legs)	22/27 April 2016	2	2 → 1	

== Qualifying rounds ==
=== Preliminary round ===
Tie	Home team	Score	Away team	Att.
1	Consett	W.O.	Shildon	
2	Chester-le-Street Town	1–7	Newcastle Benfield	122
3	Radcliffe Borough	0–4	AFC Fylde	
4	Vauxhall Motors	8–1	Bootle	
5	Lancaster City	W.O.	West Didsbury & Chorlton	
6	Clitheroe	3–8	Ashton Athletic	111
7	Irlam	3–1	Ashton Town	55
8	Skelmersdale United	3–4	Marine	114
9	AFC Liverpool	5–6	Cheadle Town	47
10	Witton Albion	W.O.	Salford City	
11	Nantwich Town	2–1	Padiham	192
12	Southport	2–6	FC United of Manchester	294
13	Macclesfield Town	0–1	Hyde United	
14	Runcorn Town	W.O.	Chester	
15	Northwich Victoria	W.O.	Prescot Cables	
16	Stalybridge Celtic	2–0	Burscough	48
17	Silsden	5–2	Hemsworth MW	35
18	Hall Road Rangers	0–3	Handsworth Parramore	
19	Staveley MW	0–1	Grimsby Town	122
20	Brigg Town	0–6	Guiseley	
21	Sheffield	3–2	Ossett Town	70
22	Selby Town	1–2	North Ferriby United	43
23	Barton Town Old Boys	W.O.	Pontefract Collieries	
24	Goole	0–4	Stocksbridge Park Steels	106
25	Rossington Main	2–1 (a.e.t.)	Cleethorpes Town	
26	Aylestone Park	3–1	Stamford	
27	Leicester Nirvana	0–0 (2–3 p)	St Andrews	56
28	Mickleover Sports	6–1	Teversal	
29	Bourne Town	1–7	Basford United	79
30	Lincoln City	9–1	Matlock Town	127
31	Lincoln United	1–1 (4–5 p)	Gresley	
32	Long Eaton United	1–2	Loughborough Dynamo	
33	Boldmere St Michaels	0–0 (3–4 p)	Studley	
34	Leek Town	0–4	Newcastle Town	115
35	Ellesmere Rangers	2–0	Bromsgrove Sporting	
36	Bilston Town	5–2	Pegasus Juniors	61
37	Romulus	3–2	Nuneaton Griff	40
38	Dudley Sports	1–2	Hereford	
39	AFC Wulfrunians	1–0	Nuneaton Town	16
40	Stratford Town	2–0	Coton Green	61
41	Kidderminster Harriers	7–0	Evesham United	149
42	Leamington	2–3	Stourbridge	31
43	Halesowen Town	5–1	Bromyard Town	50
44	Sutton Coldfield Town	0–6	AFC Telford United	
45	Pilkington XXX	2–1	Solihull Moors	49
46	Malvern Town	0–2	Coleshill Town	59
47	Coventry Sphinx	W.O.	Wednesfield	
48	Wisbech St Mary	4–1	Hadleigh United	76
49	Ipswich Wanderers	2–3 (a.e.t.)	Needham Market	64
50	Leiston	1–4	Stowmarket Town	53
51	Histon	2–1	Walsham Le Willows	85
52	Soham Town Rangers	1–3	Swaffham Town	
53	Long Melford	0–1	Wroxham	27
54	Norwich United	2–1	Great Yarmouth Town	54
55	Cambridge City	4–0	Newmarket Town	69
56	Yaxley	0–2	Brackley Town	
57	St Neots Town	5–1	Bugbrooke St Michaels	45
58	Cogenhoe United	0–1	AFC Rushden & Diamonds	92
59	Biggleswade Town	8–1	Corby Town	65
60	Rothwell Corinthians	4–9	Kettering Town	63
61	Heybridge Swifts	3–0	Tower Hamlets	35
62	Eton Manor	3–2 (a.e.t.)	Billericay Town	
63	Waltham Forest	1–9	Chelmsford City	70
64	Romford	0–6	East Thurrock United	43
65	Barkingside	0–2	Brentwood Town	
66	Saffron Walden Town	1–2	Witham Town	90
67	Clapton	1–3	AFC Hornchurch	

Tie	Home team	Score	Away team	Att.
68	Concord Rangers	1–4	Aveley	110
69	Tilbury	8–0	Halstead Town	39
70	Waltham Abbey	2–2 (0–3 p)	Broxbourne Borough	92
71	Hullbridge Sports	1–3	Bowers & Pitsea	58
72	St Magaretsbury	0–2	Cheshunt	
73	Ilford	0–1	Bishop's Stortford	
74	Royston Town	6–1	Sawbridgeworth Town	75
75	Chalfont St Peter	W.O.	Hanworth Villa	
76	Hitchin Town	5–3 (a.e.t.)	Aylesbury	51
77	Hayes & Yeading United	1–1 (4–2 p)	Wingate & Finchley	73
78	Wealdstone	7–0	Buckingham Athletic	54
79	Welwyn Garden City	0–1	Enfield Town	80
80	Boreham Wood	1–0	CB Hounslow United	68
81	Potters Bar Town	3–1	Chesham United	53
82	Newport Pagnell Town	3–2	Uxbridge	
83	Flackwell Heath	3–4	Bedfont Sports	62
84	Harrow Borough	3–2 (a.e.t.)	Staines Town	68
85	Dulwich Hamlet	4–0	Meridian	88
86	Lordswood	0–5	Chipstead	
87	VCD Athletic	0–2	Thamesmead Town	67
88	Ramsgate	4–0	Phoenix Sports	
89	Hastings United	6–3	Carshalton Athletic	
90	Tooting & Mitcham United	5–4 (a.e.t.)	Croydon	52
91	Welling United	4–2	Corinthian	104
92	Margate	9–0	Little Common	93
93	Dover Athletic	4–1	AFC Croydon Athletic	98
94	Fisher	W.O.	Eastbourne United	
95	Dartford	9–0	Cray Wanderers	128
96	Erith & Belvedere	W.O.	Cray Valley PM	
97	Ebbsfleet United	3–2	Lingfield	115
98	Faversham Town	W.O.	Colliers Wood United	
99	Chertsey Town	4–3	Dorking Wanderers	67
100	Sutton United	10–1	Worthing United	68
101	Bognor Regis Town	5–1	Littlehampton Town	36
102	Farnham Town	1–4	Raynes Park Vale	
103	Kingstonian	W.O.	Frimley Green	
104	Dorking	0–3	Woking	46
105	Wick & Barnham United	4–1	Oakwood	32
106	Molesey	4–3	Chichester City	
107	Metropolitan Police	7–1	South Park	40
108	Pagham	6–1	Mile Oak	28
109	Worthing	3–1 (a.e.t.)	Loxwood	
110	Arundel	3–2	Horley Town	
111	Three Bridges	1–1 (3–4 p)	Guildford City	52
112	Walton & Hersham	0–5	Camberley Town	43
113	Lewes	0–2	Leatherhead	63
114	Hampton & Richmond Borough	3–0	Haywards Heath Town	
115	Burnham	0–1	Aldershot Town	
116	Andover Town	3–1	Fleet Town	59
117	Basingstoke Town	2–4 (a.e.t.)	Kidlington	65
118	Binfield	2–2 (7–6 p)	Thame United	37
119	Bracknell Town	2–1	Milton United	31
120	Farnborough	0–3	Reading Town	
121	Marlow	1–4	Maidenhead	
122	Abingdon United	1–3	Hartley Wintney	
123	Bournemouth	5–1	Poole Town	63
124	Weymouth	2–1	Fareham Town	102
125	Petersfield Town	1–0	Hamworthy United	82
126	Winchester City	1–3	Moneyfields	21
127	Gillingham Town	1–9	Havant & Waterlooville	49
128	Gloucester City	7–0	Chippenham Town	52
129	Cheltenham Town	6–0	New College Swindon	126
130	Forest Green Rovers	3–1	Bristol Manor Farm	146
131	Wells City	2–6	Clevedon Town	89
132	Torquay United	W.O.	Larkhall Athletic	
133	Tiverton Town	4–1	Bishop Sutton	81

=== First round qualifying ===
Tie	Home team	Score	Away team	Att.
1	Hebburn Town	0–13	Workington	135
2	Ryton & Crawcrook Albion	3–2	Shildon	87
3	Darlington Railway Athletic	1–2	Newcastle Benfield	19
4	Gateshead	4–2	Darlington 1883	131
5	Chester	9–1	Chadderton	290
6	Ashton Athletic	3–2	Marine	80
7	AFC Fylde	3–0	Nelson	92
8	Hyde United	3–1	Vauxhall Motors	
9	Irlam	0–2	Curzon Ashton	55
10	Warrington Town	2–4 (a.e.t.)	Cheadle Town	58
11	Colne	1–3	Nantwich Town	72
12	Salford City	1–2 (a.e.t.)	Abbey Hey	95
13	FC United of Manchester	2–3	Altrincham	342
14	Stalybridge Celtic	2–5	Prescott Cables	74
15	West Didsbury & Chorlton	1–2	Wrexham	48
16	Barnton	0–4	Tranmere Rovers	
17	AFC Emley	1–2	Liversedge	96
18	FC Halifax Town	9–2	Nostell MW	144
19	Sheffield	0–3	Ossett Albion	86
20	Harrogate Town	2–3	Handsworth Parramore	
21	Rossington Main	3–1	Stocksbridge Park Steels	80
22	Silsden	3–1	Pontefract Collieries	37
23	Farsley Celtic	2–0	Knaresborough Town	60
24	Worksop Town	0–4	Guiseley	81
25	Dinnington Town	0–4	Grimsby Town	
26	Brighouse Town	3–4 (a.e.t.)	North Ferriby United	57
27	Dunkirk	0–2	Basford United	91
28	Ilkeston	5–0	Loughborough Dynamo	94
29	Boston United	4–2	Anstey Nomads	
30	Leicester Road	0–10	Lincoln City	35
31	Mickleover Sports	2–1	Ashby Ivanhoe	43
32	Aylestone Park	1–3	Oadby Town	49
33	Belper Town	0–4	Gresley	
34	St Andrews	5–0	Grantham Town	32
35	AFC Telford United	2–1	Walsall Wood	149
36	Bilston Town	4–2	Hereford	71
37	Studley	3–0	Kidsgrove Athletic	
38	Halesowen Town	2–1	Newcastle Town	92
39	Romulus	2–0	Wolverhampton Casuals	41
40	Rugby Town	3–4	AFC Wulfrunians	39
41	Tipton Town	2–4	Kidderminster Harriers	45
42	Stratford Town	4–1	Rushall Olympic	37
43	Stourbridge	W.O.	Wednesfield	
44	Coleshill Town	1–2 (a.e.t.)	Pilkington XXX	39
45	Ellesmere Rangers	0–5	Worcester City	22
46	Bedworth United	3–1	Lye Town	43
47	Dereham Town	4–1	Haverhill Rovers	43
48	Bury Town	3–2	Gorleston	45
49	Swaffham Town	3–1	Mildenhall Town	50
50	Cornard United	0–2	Needham Market	55
51	Ely City	0–1	Cambridge City	84
52	Wisbech St Mary	1–2	Norwich United	89
53	Woodbridge Town	8–1	Felixstowe & Walton United	38
54	AFC Sudbury	2–1	Histon	
55	Fakenham Town	1–3	Stowmarket Town	45
56	Brantham Athletic	1–2	Wroxham	
57	Eynesbury Rovers	0–3	Barton Rovers	67
58	Kettering Town	3–0	Wellingborough Town	44
59	Desborough Town	1–2	St Neots Town	
60	Godmanchester Rovers	2–6	AFC Dunstable	42
61	St Ives Town	0–3	Peterborough Northern Star	89
62	Biggleswade United	W.O.	Wellingborough Whitworths	
63	Brackley Town	0–5	AFC Rushden & Diamonds	85
64	Witham Town	2–3	Cheshunt	
65	Heybridge Swifts	1–2 (a.e.t.)	Broxbourne Borough	55
66	Tilbury	1–2	Aveley	79
67	Barking	3–2†	FC Clacton	
replay	Barking	5–3	FC Clacton	
68	Grays Athletic	4–0	Eton Manor	

Tie	Home team	Score	Away team	Att.
69	AFC Hornchurch	4–3	Chelmsford City	80
70	East Thurrock United	0–3	Braintree Town	
71	Bowers & Pitsea	0–3	Thurrock	64
72	Redbridge	3–0	Brentwood Town	
73	Royston Town	3–2 (a.e.t.)	Ware	
74	Great Wakering Rovers	3–0	Bishop's Stortford	70
75	Boreham Wood	1–0	Leverstock Green	93
76	Chalfont St Peter	1–4	Harrow Borough	
77	Bedfont Sports	9–0	Newport Pagnell Town	
78	Northwood	2–0	Ashford Town (Middx)	32
79	Edgware Town	1–3 (a.e.t.)	Hitchin Town	36
80	Potters Bar Town	0–3	Hayes & Yeading United	33
81	Wealdstone	4–0	Cockfosters	
82	Beaconsfield SYCOB	2–0	Hendon	
83	Spelthorne Sports	1–2 (a.e.t.)	Enfield Town	
84	St Albans City	5–3	North Greenford United	41
85	Harefield United	W.O.	Tring Athletic	
86	Erith & Belvedere	0–6	Eastbourne Borough	38
87	Ramsgate	0–5	Tooting & Mitcham United	30
88	Dulwich Hamlet	6–0	Whitstable Town	104
89	Dartford	4–1	Chipstead	
90	Hastings United	0–2	Eastbourne Town	
91	Maidstone United	2–0	Welling United	224
92	Tonbridge Angels	0–3	Dover Athletic	
93	Margate	8–2	East Grinstead Town	91
94	Fisher	W.O.	Bromley	
95	Faversham Town	0–5	Ebbsfleet United	
96	Thamesmead Town	13–0	Ringmer	
97	Chatham Town	0–2	Folkestone Invicta	53
98	Sutton United	11–0	Westfield	65
99	Metropolitan Police	3–0	Hampton & Richmond Borough	66
100	Kingstonian	1–14	Chertsey Town	30
101	Shoreham	0–4	Camberley Town	33
102	Woking	3–2	Corinthian Casuals	72
103	Knaphill	8–0	Redhill	
104	Guildford City	1–5	Burgess Hill Town	
105	Wick & Barnham United	0–10	Worthing	
106	Leatherhead	5–2	Arundel	35
107	Bognor Regis Town	1–1 (2–4 p)	Molesey	55
108	Pagham	W.O.	East Preston	
109	Crawley Down Gatwick	1–6	Whitehawk	55
110	Raynes Park Vale	6–0	Horsham	
111	Didcot Town	1–2	Alton Town	26
112	Thatcham Town	0–6	Hungerford Town	
113	Bracknell Town	2–2 (3–5 p)	Fleet Spurs	44
114	Wantage Town	0–7	Andover Town	
115	Ascot United	8–3	Hartley Wintney	
116	Aldershot Town	2–1	Maidenhead United	54
117	Oxford City	9–0	Windsor	
118	Shrivenham	2–3 (a.e.t.)	Binfield	37
119	Highmoor Ibis	1–2	Kidlington	36
120	Slough Town	1–7	Reading Town	
121	Sholing	1–0	Salisbury	79
122	Wimborne Town	4–2 (a.e.t.)	Ringwood Town	
123	Petersfield Town	1–0	Weymouth	56
124	Gosport Borough	3–2	Moneyfields	46
125	Bournemouth	W.O.	AFC Totton	
126	Havant & Waterlooville	3–2	Eastleigh	74
127	Yate Town	0–2	Forest Green Rovers	
128	Pewsey Vale	1–7	Gloucester City	
129	Oldland Abbotonians	0–17	Cheltenham Town	50
130	Tuffley Rovers	1–3	Cirencester Town	37
131	Taunton Town	2–1	Weston Super Mare	107
132	Bath City	5–3	Radstock Town	116
133	Tiverton Town	3–3 (2–4 p)	Larkhall Athletic	58
134	Odd Down	2–1	Cullompton Rangers	31
135	Clevedon Town	3–1	Bridgwater Town	
136	Ashton & Backwell United	2–1	Brislington	66

Notes:

- † = Tie ordered to be replayed

=== Second round qualifying ===
Tie	Home team	Score	Away team	Att.
1	Tranmere Rovers	3–2	Curzon Ashton	155
2	Ashton Athletic	3–2	Hyde United	93
3	Ryton & Crawcrook Albion	0–1 (a.e.t.)	Prescot Cables	100
4	Wrexham	3–0	Abbey Hey	83
5	Workington	2–4	Altrincham	99
6	Gateshead	0–6	Newcastle Benfield	177
7	Chester	7–0	Cheadle Town	175
8	AFC Fylde	1–0	Nantwich Town	76
9	Farsley Celtic	0–5	FC Halifax Town	99
10	Handsworth Parramore	1–2	Guiseley	85
11	Ossett Albion	3–2	Grimsby Town	89
12	North Ferriby United	5–4 (a.e.t.)	Liversedge	80
13	Silsden	6–3	Rossington Main	60
14	Mickleover Sports	2–3 (a.e.t.)	Basford United	37
15	Gresley	2–6 (a.e.t.)	Oadby Town	82
16	St Andrews	0–5	Ilkeston	68
17	Boston United	2–3 (a.e.t.)	Lincoln City	
18	Stourbridge	5–2	Bilston Town	
19	Bedworth United	2–4	AFC Telford United	54
20	Stratford Town	2–3	Studley	23
21	Halesowen Town	0–7	Kidderminster Harriers	153
22	Worcester City	1–3	AFC Wulfrunians	
23	Pilkington XXX	0–3	Romulus	46
24	Woodbridge Town	3–1	Bury Town	35
25	Needham Market	0–0 (3–1 p)	AFC Sudbury	
26	Swaffham Town	1–3	Stowmarket Town	54
27	Wroxham	2–8	Dereham Town	
28	Norwich United	1–3	Cambridge City	64
29	Peterborough Northern Star	2–3	Barton Rovers	59
30	AFC Rushden & Diamonds	1–4	Biggleswade Town	
31	Royston Town	5–1	Kettering Town	67
32	St Neots Town	0–7	AFC Dunstable	63
33	Braintree Town	2–1	Broxbourne Borough	
34	Barking	5–5 (5–4 p)	Thurrock	

Tie	Home team	Score	Away team	Att.
35	Aveley	3–1	Redbridge	93
36	Great Wakering Rovers	3–2 (a.e.t.)	Cheshunt	58
37	AFC Hornchurch	2–0	Grays Athletic	42
38	Beaconsfield SYCOB	0–1	Bedfont Sports	48
39	Hitchin Town	1–3	Enfield Town	
40	Northwood	0–4	St Albans City	29
41	Harefield United	0–3	Boreham Wood	74
42	Wealdstone	0–1	Hayes & Yeading United	71
43	Bromley	3–2	Tooting & Mitcham United	
44	Folkestone Invicta	1–0	Eastbourne Borough	
45	Margate	2–4	Dulwich Hamlet	100
46	Dartford	1–6	Dover Athletic	192
47	Thamesmead Town	1–5	Maidstone United	81
48	Ebbsfleet United	3–2 (a.e.t.)	Eastbourne Town	
49	Reading Town	4–4 (1–4 p)	Pagham	
50	Metropolitan Police	3–0	Knaphill	
51	Sutton United	4–0	Raynes Park Vale	145
52	Worthing	3–1	Leatherhead	
53	Camberley Town	3–0	Chertsey Town	
54	Molesey	1–5	Burgess Hill Town	
55	Woking	4–3 (a.e.t.)	Whitehawk	89
56	Aldershot Town	7–2	Alton Town	57
57	Fleet Spurs	0–4	Oxford City	56
58	Hungerford Town	4–0	Binfield	85
59	Kidlington	4–1	Harrow Borough	70
60	Ascot United	1–3	Andover Town	
61	Wimborne Town	1–4	Sholing	
62	Petersfield Town	0–4	Gosport Borough	
63	Havant & Waterlooville	1–2	Bournemouth	81
64	Larkhall Athletic	0–3	Gloucester City	36
65	Cirencester Town	2–0	Odd Down	29
66	Cheltenham Town	6–0	Clevedon Town	
67	Ashton & Backwell United	0–5	Forest Green Rovers	108
68	Bath City	3–2	Taunton Town	

=== Third round qualifying ===
Tie	Home team	Score	Away team	Att.
1	AFC Fylde	3–2	Ashton Athletic	95
2	Guiseley	1–2	North Ferriby United	124
3	Basford United	4–1	FC Halifax Town	101
4	Silsden	0–6	Chester	78
5	Ossett Albion	0–6	Wrexham	97
6	Newcastle Benfield	1–2	Altrincham	151
7	Prescot Cables	1–4	Tranmere Rovers	235
8	AFC Telford United	2–1	Kidderminster Harriers	168
9	Oadby Town	2–3	Lincoln City	100
10	Romulus	2–5	Stourbridge	86
11	AFC Wulfrunians	1–4	Cambridge City	76
12	Studley	1–4	Ilkeston	81
13	Aveley	2–1 (a.e.t.)	Royston Town	82
14	Needham Market	2–7	Biggleswade Town	93
15	Boreham Wood	2–1	Great Wakering Rovers	98
16	Barton Rovers	5–4 (a.e.t.)	AFC Dunstable	140
17	Hayes & Yeading United	4–1	St Albans City	51

Tie	Home team	Score	Away team	Att.
18	AFC Hornchurch	1–0	Bedfont Sports	86
19	Woodbridge Town	3–0	Braintree Town	72
20	Barking	0–3	Enfield Town	31
21	Stowmarket Town	0–3	Dereham Town	42
22	Metropolitan Police	1–0	Folkestone Invicta	44
23	Worthing	5–2	Burgess Hill Town	107
24	Aldershot Town	1–2	Sutton United	63
25	Woking	4–1	Pagham	103
26	Camberley Town	2–4 (a.e.t.)	Dover Athletic	105
27	Ebbsfleet United	3–1	Maidstone United	249
28	Dulwich Hamlet	3–1	Bromley	178
29	Sholing	1–0 (a.e.t.)	Andover Town	103
30	Forest Green Rovers	1–0	Hungerford Town	
31	Cheltenham Town	2–0	Gosport Borough	74
32	Bournemouth	3–3 (5–4 p)	Oxford City	127
33	Kidlington	1–0 (a.e.t.)	Bath City	67
34	Gloucester City	3–2	Cirencester Town	

== First round ==
Tie	Home team	Score	Away team	Att.
1	Hartlepool United	0–2	Fleetwood Town	74
2	North Ferriby United	1–2	Morecambe	110
3	Scunthorpe United	2–1	Wrexham	163
4	Accrington Stanley	4–1	Basford United	201
5	Oldham Athletic	3–2 (a.e.t.)	Chester	353
6	Altrincham	0–2	Rochdale	353
7	Doncaster Rovers	2–1 (a.e.t.)	Barnsley	322
8	Sheffield United	0–0 (4–2 p)	Bradford City	268
9	Blackpool	1–4	Crewe Alexandra	392
10	Wigan Athletic	4–2	York City	160
11	Carlisle United	3–2 (a.e.t.)	Tranmere Rovers	166
12	AFC Fylde	1–4	Bury	103
13	Lincoln City	1–0	Port Vale	141
14	Stourbridge	2–3	Chesterfield	151
15	Ilkeston	0–0 (5–3 p)	Burton Albion	198
16	Mansfield Town	2–0	Cambridge City	253
17	Shrewsbury Town	2–1 (a.e.t.)	AFC Telford United	413
18	Walsall	1–4	Coventry City	201
19	Northampton Town	0–2	Notts County	284
20	Aveley	0–3	Stevenage	113

Tie	Home team	Score	Away team	Att.
21	Dereham Town	2–1	Peterborough United	199
22	Luton Town	3–1	Colchester United	407
23	Biggleswade Town	6–1	Enfield Town	90
24	Cambridge United	5–0	Hayes & Yeading	187
25	AFC Hornchurch	0–2	Leyton Orient	152
26	Barton Rovers	1–9	Southend United	83
27	Woodbridge Town	4–4 (4–3 p)	Dagenham & Redbridge	140
28	Boreham Wood	1–3	Barnet	122
29	Metropolitan Police	2–2 (4–2 p)	Dulwich Hamlet	71
30	Gillingham	1–2	Ebbsfleet United	343
31	Millwall	2–0	Dover Athletic	527
32	Sutton United	3–4 (a.e.t.)	Worthing	114
33	AFC Wimbledon	4–0	Woking	443
34	Cheltenham Town	5–1	Swindon Town	172
35	AFC Bournemouth	1–6	Exeter City	116
36	Gloucester City	1–4	Bristol Rovers	
37	Oxford United	6–0	Kidlington	262
38	Yeovil Town	4–0	Forest Green Rovers	249
39	Sholing	0–0 (2–4 p)	Newport County	131
40	Plymouth Argyle	0–3	Portsmouth	340

== Second round ==
Tie	Home team	Score	Away team	Att.
1	Lincoln City	0–1	Wigan Athletic	187
2	Ilkeston	4–1	Shrewsbury Town	269
3	Chesterfield	0–3	Sheffield United	
4	Accrington Stanley	2–1	Fleetwood Town	224
5	Oldham Athletic	4–1	Morecambe	171
6	Coventry City	2–0	Crewe Alexandra	160
7	Scunthorpe United	1–4	Bury	170
8	Notts County	2–1	Rochdale	257
9	Carlisle United	1–0 (a.e.t.)	Doncaster Rovers	197
10	Mansfield Town	4–3 (a.e.t.)	Dereham Town	194

Tie	Home team	Score	Away team	Att.
11	AFC Wimbledon	2–0	Ebbsfleet United	344
12	Exeter City	2–1	Oxford United	209
13	Cheltenham Town	3–2	Barnet	139
14	Cambridge United	0–0 (2–4 p)	Stevenage	234
15	Leyton Orient	0–1	Luton Town	337
16	Yeovil Town	1–1 (6–7 p)	Metropolitan Police	226
17	Biggleswade Town	3–4	Worthing	165
18	Newport County	1–2 (a.e.t.)	Southend United	493
19	Millwall	9–1	Woodbridge Town	273
20	Bristol Rovers	3–3 (1–3 p)	Portsmouth	204

== Third round ==
Tie	Home team	Score	Away team	Att.
1	Wigan Athletic	3–1	Stevenage	220
2	Coventry City	1–0	Stoke City	262
3	Manchester United	2–1	Queens Park Rangers	1,403
4	Blackburn Rovers	1–0	Southend United	292
5	Swansea City	1–0	Sheffield Wednesday	101
6	Oldham Athletic	1–1 (8–7 p)	AFC Bournemouth	248
7	Charlton Athletic	1–1 (4–2 p)	Millwall	972
8	Notts County	1–3	Luton Town	260
9	Arsenal	4–1	West Bromwich Albion	516
10	Nottingham Forest	1–1 (4–3 p)	Brighton & Hove Albion	446
11	Derby County	3–1	West Ham United	545
12	Mansfield Town	1–5	Sunderland	312
13	Hull City	1–3	Norwich City	151
14	Exeter City	4–3	Bolton Wanderers	259
15	Ilkeston	2-3	Newcastle United	927
16	Tottenham Hotspur	4–0	Rotherham United	383

Tie	Home team	Score	Away team	Att.
17	Wolverhampton Wanderers	3–0	Milton Keynes Dons	381
18	Reading	3–1 (a.e.t.)	Sheffield United	591
19	Liverpool	2–1	Ipswich Town	
20	Worthing	0–3	Middlesbrough	1,154
21	Southampton	2–3	Birmingham City	305
22	Portsmouth	1–2	Manchester City	1,779
23	Everton	0–1	Aston Villa	289
24	Carlisle United	1–2 (a.e.t.)	Preston North End	280
25	Leicester City	5–0	Cheltenham Town	416
26	Burnley	2–2 (5–6 p)	Metropolitan Police	215
27	Chelsea	6–1	Huddersfield Town	141
28	Watford	2–2 (2-4 p)	AFC Wimbledon	415
29	Brentford	2–3	Leeds United	287
30	Bristol City	0–4	Cardiff City	345
31	Fulham	4–2	Bury	195
32	Accrington Stanley	2–3 (a.e.t.)	Crystal Palace	215

== Fourth round ==
Tie	Home team	Score	Away team	Att.
1	Coventry City	2–1	Charlton Athletic	200
2	Newcastle United	1–2	AFC Wimbledon	915
3	Blackburn Rovers	3–2 (a.e.t.)	Leicester City	291
4	Wigan Athletic	1–0	Derby County	351
5	Wolverhampton Wanderers	5–0	Metropolitan Police	308
6	Crystal Palace	1–5	Aston Villa	636
7	Liverpool	3–0	Cardiff City	
8	Sunderland	1–4	Norwich City	315

Tie	Home team	Score	Away team	Att.
9	Fulham	1–3	Reading	336
10	Exeter City	1–2	Preston North End	295
11	Oldham Athletic	0–1	Luton Town	378
12	Manchester United	1–5	Chelsea	1,104
13	Tottenham Hotspur	1–3	Middlesbrough	389
14	Leeds United	2–5	Manchester City	1,477
15	Nottingham Forest	1–0	Birmingham City	646
16	Swansea City	1–3	Arsenal	428

== Fifth round ==
Tie	Home team	Score	Away team	Att.
1	Preston North End	1–1 (3–5 p)	Luton Town	705
2	Norwich City	5-4 (a.e.t.)	Middlesbrough	1,062
3	AFC Wimbledon	1–4	Chelsea	3,455
4	Wolverhampton Wanderers	0–3	Reading	350
5	Wigan Athletic	1–3 (a.e.t.)	Manchester City	672
6	Aston Villa	1–2	Blackburn Rovers	809
7	Coventry City	2–2 (6–7 p)	Arsenal	1,828
8	Nottingham Forest	1–2	Liverpool	1,377

== Quarter-finals ==
Tie	Home team	Score	Away team	Att.
1	Chelsea	2–1	Reading	1,755
2	Blackburn Rovers	1–0	Luton Town	716
3	Manchester City	2–0	Norwich City	1,300
4	Arsenal	2–1	Liverpool	3,293

== Semi-finals ==
Team 1	Agg.	Team 2	1st leg	2nd leg
Blackburn Rovers	1–4	Chelsea	0–1	1–3
Manchester City	4–3	Arsenal	2–1	2–2

=== First leg ===
18 March 2016
19:00

Blackburn Rovers	0 – 1	Chelsea
	Report	Tomori 19'

Ewood Park, Blackburn
Attendance: 1,007

18 March 2016
19:00

Manchester City	2-1	Arsenal
Nmecha 25'; Buckley 39'	Report	Reine-Adelaide 4'

Academy Stadium
Attendance: 1,321

=== Second leg ===
4 April 2016
19:45

Arsenal	2–2	Manchester City
Willock 6'; Malen 62'	Report	Diaz 17'; Kongolo 32'

Emirates Stadium
Attendance: 4,600

8 April 2016
19:45

Chelsea	3 – 1	Blackburn Rovers
Sterling 13'; Maddox 30'; Abraham 34'	Report	Mansell 62'

Stamford Bridge, London
Attendance: 3,702

== Final ==
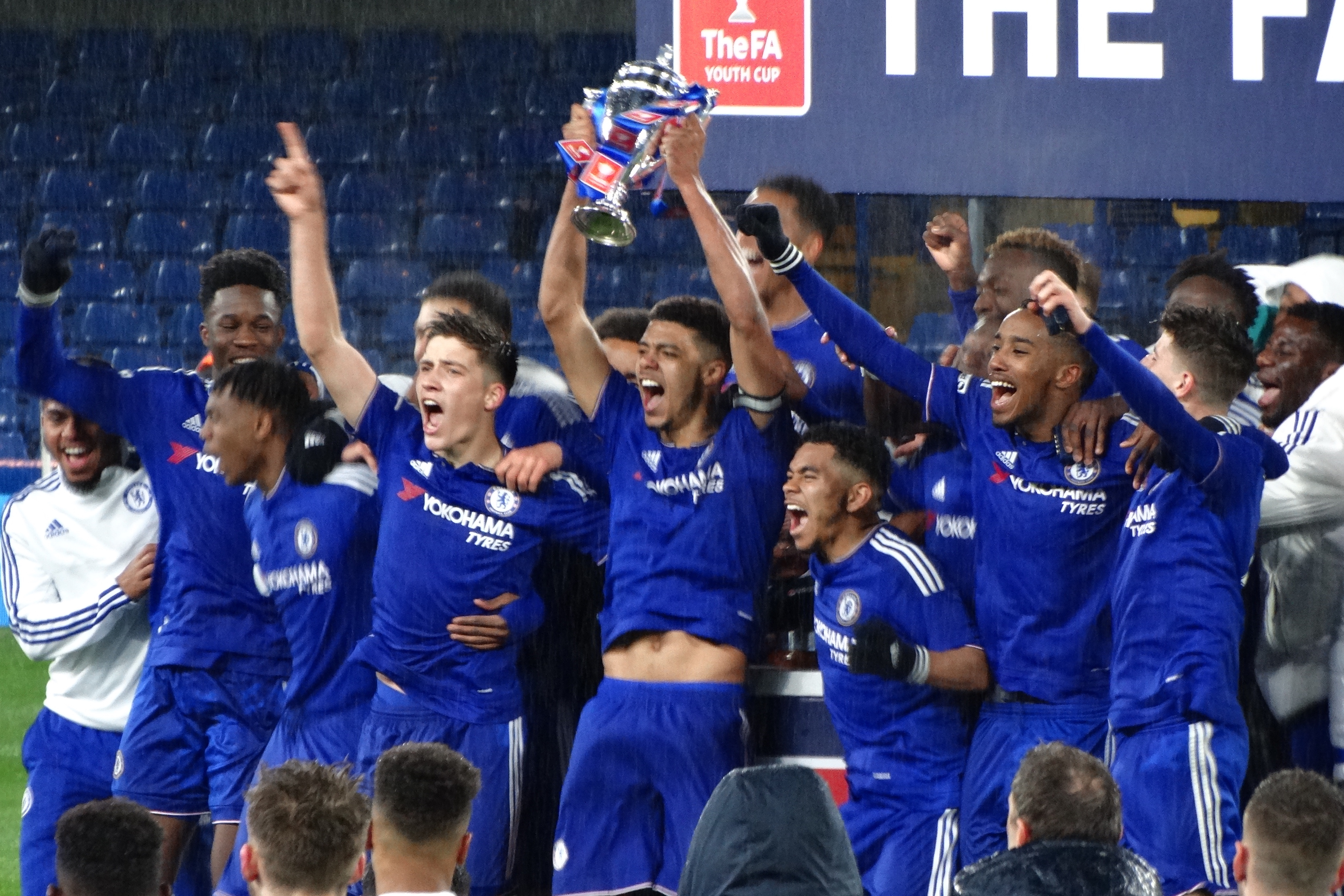
Chelsea players celebrating winning the cup.

Team 1	Agg.	Team 2	1st leg	2nd leg
Manchester City	2–4	Chelsea	1–1	1–3

=== First leg ===
22 April 2016
19:45

Manchester City	1–1	Chelsea
Nemane 68'	Report	Mount 50'

Academy Stadium
Attendance: 4,084
Referee: Paul Tierney

=== Second leg ===
27 April 2016
19:45

Chelsea	3–1	Manchester City
Sterling 45+2'; Abraham 53'; Tomori 73'	Report	Diaz 87'

Stamford Bridge
Attendance: 8,530
Referee: Paul Tierney

== See also ==
- 2015–16 Professional U18 Development League
- 2015–16 Under-21 Premier League Cup
- 2015–16 FA Cup
- 2015–16 in English football
