= 2019–20 FA Youth Cup =

Football Association Youth Cup

Tournament details
- Country: England; Wales
- Teams: 546

Final positions
- Champions: Manchester City (3rd Title)
- Runners-up: Chelsea (4th Runner Up Finish)

Tournament statistics
- Top goal scorer(s): (England) Marcel Lewis Chelsea, (Scotland) Kyle Joseph Wigan Athletic (6 Goals Each)

The 2019–20 FA Youth Cup was the 68th edition of the FA Youth Cup. The defending champions were Liverpool. Manchester City won the final 3–2 against Chelsea. This was their third time winning the tournament.

== First round ==
41 ties were meant to be played, but the Bolton Wanderers would get a bye to the next round, while Dulwich Hamlet FC received a walkover as Crawley Town withdrew from the competition.

| Tie | Home team | Score | Away team | Att. |
|---|---|---|---|---|
| 1 | Plymouth Argyle (4) | 0–1 | Exeter City (4) | 252 |
| 2 | Portsmouth (3) | 5–1 | Hereford (6) | 294 |
| 3 | Sutton Common Rovers (9) | 1–3 | Uxbridge (8) | 183 |
| 4 | Bradford City (4) | 3–0 | Rochdale (3) | 252 |
| 5 | Sunderland (3) | 3–1 | Tranmere Rovers (3) | |
| 6 | Curzon Ashton (6) | 2–1 | Blackpool (3) | 235 |
| 7 | Mansfield Town (4) | 4–3 | Doncaster Rovers (3) | 150 |
| 8 | Milton Keynes Dons (3) | 0–2 | Ware (8) | 399 |
| 9 | AFC Sudbury (8) | 2–1 | Bowers & Pitsea (7) | 141 |
| 10 | AFC Wimbledon (3) | 5–0 | Leyton Orient (4) | 436 |
| 11 | Forest Green Rovers (4) | 5–0 | Helston Athletic (10) | 255 |
| 12 | Bridgwater Town (9) | 0–1 | Newport County (4) | 213 |
| 13 | Swindon Town (4) | 1–3 | Bristol Rovers (3) | 324 |
| 14 | Long Eaton United (9) | 3–5 | Wrexham (5) | 105 |
| 15 | Morpeth Town (7) | 1–0 | Chester (6) | 80 |
| 16 | Oldham Athletic (4) | 4–1 | Nantwich Town (7) | 399 |
| 17 | South Shields (7) | 2–1 | Morecambe (4) | 312 |
| 18 | Shrewsbury Town (3) | 1–0 | Port Vale | 159 |
| 19 | Coventry City (3) | 1–2 | Walsall (4) | 327 |
| 20 | Northampton Town (4) | 1–2 | Colchester United (4) | 478 |
| 21 | Maidenhead United (5) | 2–1 | Kingstonian (7) | |

| Tie | Home team | Score | Away team | Att. |
|---|---|---|---|---|
| 22 | Barnet (5) | 4–2 | Dorking Wanderers (6) | 207 |
| 22 | Cheltenham Town (3) | 3–2 | Eastleigh (5) | 171 |
| 24 | Fleetwood Town (3) | 5–0 | FC Halifax Town (5) | |
| 25 | Salford City (4) | 2–3 | Carlisle United (4) | 249 |
| 26 | Haughmond (9) | 1–3 | Rotherham United (3) | 81 |
| 27 | Macclesfield Town (4) | 2–3 | Crewe Alexandra (4) | 209 |
| 28 | Southend United (4) | 1–2 | Cambridge United (4) | 277 |
| 29 | Dereham Town (8) | 0–1 | Peterborough United (3) | 296 |
| 30 | Grimsby Town (4) | 1–0 (AET) | Rugby Town (9) | |
| 31 | Accrington Stanley (3) | 1–2 | Hartlepool United (5) | |
| 32 | Chesterfield (5) | 1–2 | Burton Albion (3) | 274 |
| 33 | Notts County (5) | 0–1 | Scunthorpe United (4) | 180 |
| 34 | Bath City (6) | 3–2 | Andover Town (10) | 182 |
| 35 | Gillingham (3) | 2–3 | Hanworth Villa (9) | |
| 36 | Rushall Olympic (7) | 0–4 | Lincoln City (3) | 200 |
| 37 | Ipswich Town (3) | 6–1 | King's Lynn Town (6) | 267 |
| 38 | Croydon (10) | 1–0 | Aveley (8) | 68 |
| 39 | Reading City (9) | 0–1 | Oxford United (3) | 300 |
| 40 | Stevenage (4) | 5–1 | Brentwood Town (8) | 204 |
| 41 | Dulwich Hamlet (6) | W/O | Crawley Town (4) | NA |
| 42 | Bolton Wanderers (3) | BYE | | NA |

== Second round ==
| Tie | Home team | Score | Away team | Att. |
|---|---|---|---|---|
| 1 | Walsall (4) | 0–3 | Fleetwood Town (3) | 283 |
| 2 | Bristol Rovers (3) | 2–1 | AFC Sudbury (8) | 219 |
| 3 | Carlisle United (4) | 2–3 | Bradford City (4) | 270 |
| 4 | Uxbridge (8) | 3–4 | Newport County (4) | |
| 5 | Crewe Alexandra (4) | 2–0 | Grimsby Town (4) | 314 |
| 6 | Cheltenham Town (4) | 8–4 | Portsmouth (3) | 174 |
| 7 | Ware (8) | 1–3 | Maidenhead (5) | 190 |
| 8 | Mansfield Town (4) | 4–2 | Rotherham United (3) | 189 |
| 9 | Scunthorpe United (4) | 2–1 | Morpeth Town (7) | 174 |
| 10 | Burton Albion (3) | 1–1 (1–3 p) | Bolton Wanderers (3) | 275 |
| 11 | Barnet (5) | 3–2 | Cambridge United (4) | 184 |

| Tie | Home team | Score | Away team | Att. |
|---|---|---|---|---|
| 12 | Shrewsbury Town (3) | 2–5 | Sunderland (3) | 154 |
| 13 | Ipswich Town (3) | 2–1 | Exeter City (4) | 331 |
| 14 | Croydon (10) | 2–0 | Bath City (6) | 150 |
| 15 | Hanworth Villa (9) | 1–5 | AFC Wimbledon (3) | |
| 16 | Dulwich Hamlet (6) | 1–9 | Forest Green Rovers (4) | |
| 17 | Colchester United (4) | 3–4 | Oxford United (3) | |
| 18 | Stevenage (4) | 3–1 | Peterborough United (3) | 233 |
| 19 | South Shields (7) | 3–2 | Hartlepool United (5) | 445 |
| 20 | Curzon Ashton (6) | 3–2 | Oldham Athletic (4) | 433 |
| 21 | Lincoln City (3) | 3–0 | Wrexham (5) | 337 |

== Third round ==
| Tie | Home team | Score | Away team | Att. |
|---|---|---|---|---|
| 1 | Tottenham Hotspur | 4–2 | Liverpool | 865 |
| 2 | Fleetwood Town (3) | 2–2 (4–3 p) | Watford | 174 |
| 3 | Bolton Wanderers (3) | 0–7 | Millwall (2) | 207 |
| 4 | Derby County (2) | 1–0 | Everton | |
| 5 | Leeds United (2) | 3–1 | Hull City (2) | |
| 6 | Crewe Alexandra (4) | 1–2 | Barnsley (2) | |
| 7 | Brighton & Hove Albion | 3–2 | Leicester City | 306 |
| 8 | Stevenage (4) | 0–0 (2–4 p) | Aston Villa | 228 or 406 |
| 9 | Norwich City | 3–2 | Newcastle United | |
| 10 | West Bromwich Albion (2) | 3–0 | Scunthorpe United (4) | 295 |
| 11 | Middlesbrough (2) | 1–1 (5–4 p) | Forest Green Rovers (4) | 378 |
| 12 | AFC Bournemouth | 4–3 | Barnet (5) | 448 |
| 13 | Bristol Rovers (3) | 1–3 | Southampton | 509 |
| 14 | Luton Town (2) | 2–3 | Sheffield Wednesday (2) | 281 |
| 15 | Fulham (2) | 10–1 | South Shields (7) | 132 |
| 16 | Bradford City (4) | 3–3 (5–4 p) | Stoke City (2) | 297 |

| Tie | Home team | Score | Away team | Att. |
|---|---|---|---|---|
| 17 | Sunderland (3) | 1–4 | Birmingham City (2) | |
| 18 | Reading (2) | 2–4 | Crystal Palace | 227 |
| 19 | West Ham United | 3–3 (4–5 p) | Charlton Athletic (3) | |
| 20 | Manchester United | 2–0 | Lincoln City (3) | 628 |
| 21 | Cardiff City (2) | 2–1 | Ipswich Town (3) | |
| 22 | Preston North End (2) | 2–0 | Bristol City (2) | 504 |
| 23 | Mansfield Town (4) | 3–1 | Queens Park Rangers (2) | 247 |
| 24 | Wigan Athletic (2) | 8–1 | Croydon (10) | 240 |
| 25 | Sheffield United | 2–1 | AFC Wimbledon (3) | 336 |
| 26 | Blackburn Rovers (2) | 3–1 | Newport County (4) | 800 |
| 27 | Curzon Ashton (6) | 0–5 | Burnley | 363 |
| 28 | Wolverhampton Wanderers | 3–0 | Nottingham Forest (2) | |
| 29 | Cheltenham Town (4) | 0–0 (2–4 p) | Arsenal | 450 |
| 30 | Chelsea | 4–0 | Huddersfield Town (2) | 692 |
| 31 | Manchester City | 3–0 | Swansea City (2) | 374 |
| 32 | Oxford United (3) | 1–0 | Maidenhead United (5) | 168 |

== Fourth round ==
| Tie | Home team | Score | Away team | Att. |
|---|---|---|---|---|
| 1 | West Bromwich Albion (2) | 4–1 | Middlesbrough (2) | 300 |
| 2 | Millwall (2) | 3–1 | Fleetwood Town (3) | 411 |
| 3 | Derby County (2) | 1–2 | Brighton & Hove Albion | |
| 4 | Wigan Athletic (2) | 2–0 | Tottenham Hotspur | 668 |
| 5 | Leeds United (2) | 2–2 (5–4 p) | Sheffield Wednesday (2) | 650 |
| 6 | Arsenal | 1–0 | Southampton | 670 |
| 7 | AFC Bournemouth | 1–0 | Cardiff City (2) | 438 |
| 8 | Manchester City | 2–1 | Aston Villa | 532 |

| Tie | Home team | Score | Away team | Att. |
|---|---|---|---|---|
| 9 | Chelsea | 5–0 | Bradford City (4) | 180 |
| 10 | Birmingham City (2) | 2–1 | Barnsley (2) | |
| 11 | Sheffield United | 1–2 | Fulham (2) | 383 |
| 12 | Wolverhampton Wanderers | 2–1 | Crystal Palace | |
| 13 | Mansfield Town (4) | 0–3 | Burnley | 432 |
| 14 | Blackburn Rovers (2) | 1–0 | Charlton Athletic (3) | 498 |
| 15 | Preston North End (2) | 2–0 | Oxford United (3) | 557 |
| 16 | Norwich City | 0–2 | Manchester United | 3,421 |

== Fifth round ==
| Tie | Home team | Score | Away team | Att. |
|---|---|---|---|---|
| 1 | Burnley | 2–0 | West Bromwich Albion (2) | |
| 2 | AFC Bournemouth | 2–3 | Millwall (2) | 648 |
| 3 | Wigan Athletic (2) | 4–0 | Birmingham City (2) | 366 |
| 4 | Manchester United | 1–0 | Leeds United (2) | 4,263 |
| 5 | Arsenal | 4–3 | Brighton & Hove Albion | 720 |
| 6 | Manchester City | 1–0 | Fulham (2) | 722 |
| 7 | Chelsea | 7–0 | Wolverhampton Wanderers | 201 |
| 8 | Blackburn Rovers (2) | 4–2 | Preston North End (2) | 978 |

== Quarter finals ==
| Tie no | Home team | Score | Away team | Attendance |
|---|---|---|---|---|
| 1 | Chelsea | 1–0 | Millwall (2) | 2,898 |
| 2 | Manchester United | 2–1 | Wigan Athletic (2) | 3,681 |
| 3 | Manchester City | 1–0 | Burnley | 673 |
| 4 | Blackburn Rovers (2) | 4–1 | Arsenal | 776 |

== Semi finals ==
30 October 2020
15:00

| Blackburn Rovers (2) | 0–4 | Manchester City |
|---|---|---|
| | | Hodge 56'; Delap 79'; McAtee 81'; Braaf 84' |

St George's Park
Attendance: Behind Closed Doors
Referee: Ross Joyce
30 October 2020
19:00

| Chelsea | 1–0 | Manchester United |
|---|---|---|
| Fiabema 49' |

St George's Park
Attendance: Behind Closed Doors
Referee: Oliver Yates

== Final ==
2 November 2020
19:30

| Manchester City | 3–2 | Chelsea |
|---|---|---|
| McAtee 37'; Rogers 52'; Palmer 83' | Report | Lewis 28'; Harwood-Bellis 60' (o.g.) |

St George's Park
Attendance: Behind Closed Doors
Referee: Geoff Eltringham

Note: Flags indicate national team as defined under FIFA eligibility rules; some limited exceptions apply. Players may hold more than one non-FIFA nationality.

Manchester City
| No. | Pos. | Nation | Player |
|---|---|---|---|
| 1 | GK | SCO | Cieran Slicker |
| 2 | DF | ENG | CJ Egan-Riley |
| 3 | DF | ENG | Taylor Harwood-Bellis |
| 4 | DF | ENG | Luke Mbete-Tabu |
| 5 | DF | SEN | Alpha Diounkou |
| 6 | MF | IRL | Joe Hodge |
| 7 | FW | ENG | Cole Palmer |
| 8 | MF | ENG | Tommy Doyle |
| 9 | FW | ENG | Liam Delap |
| 10 | MF | ENG | James McAtee (substituted off) 87' |
| 11 | FW | ENG | Morgan Rogers (substituted off) 76' |
Substitutes:
| 12 | DF | ENG | Finley Burns |
| 13 | GK | ENG | Josh McNamara |
| 14 | MF | ENG | Alex Robertson (substituted on) 87' |
| 15 | FW | ENG | Sam Edozie |
| 16 | MF | ENG | Ben Knight |
| 17 | FW | NED | Jayden Braaf (substituted on) 76' |
| 18 | FW | NOR | Oscar Bobb |
Coach: (Spain) Carlos Vicens

Chelsea
| No. | Pos. | Nation | Player |
|---|---|---|---|
| 1 | GK | FIN | Lucas Bergström |
| 2 | DF | ENG | Valentino Livramento |
| 3 | DF | ENG | Henry Lawrence |
| 4 | DF | ENG | Dynel Simeu |
| 5 | DF | ENG | Levi Colwill |
| 6 | MF | ENG | Lewis Bate |
| 7 | MF | ENG | Myles Peart-Harris |
| 8 | MF | CMR | Ben Elliott (substituted off) 46' |
| 9 | FW | NOR | Bryan Fiabema (substituted off) 61' |
| 10 | MF | ENG | Marcel Lewis |
| 11 | DF | ENG | Dion Rankine |
Substitutes:
| 12 | DF | ENG | Bashir Humphreys |
| 13 | GK | ENG | Jake Askew |
| 14 | FW | ENG | Tino Anjorin (substituted on) 46' |
| 15 | MF | AUT | Thierno Ballo (substituted on) 61' |
| 16 | MF | ENG | Charlie Webster |
| 17 | MF | ENG | Harvey Vale |
| 18 | FW | ENG | Jude Soonsup-Bell |
Coach: (England) Ed Brand

== See also ==
- 2019–20 FA Cup
