= 2015–16 Professional U18 Development League =

The 2015–16 Professional U18 Development League was the fourth season of the Professional Development League system.

== League 1 ==
Barclays U18 Premier League
- Season: 2015–16
- Champions: Manchester City U18s (1st Title)
- Matches: 348
- Goals: 1,264 (3.63 per match)
- Top goalscorer: (England) Edward Nketiah Arsenal U18s (24 Goals)
- Biggest home win: Chelsea U18s 7–0 Norwich City U18s (31 October 2015)
- Biggest away win: Everton U18s 0–8 Wolverhampton Wanderers U18s (28 November 2015), Newcastle United U18s 0–8 Everton U18s (28 November 2015)
- Highest scoring: Tottenham Hotspur U18s 7–3 Wolverhampton Wanderers U18s (19 March 2016)
- Longest winning run: 7 Matches – Everton U18s (3 October 2015 – 14 November 2015); Fulham U18s (7 November 2015 – 26 January 2016)
- Longest unbeaten run: 13 Matches – Chelsea U18s (26 September 2015 – 23 January 2016); Manchester City U18s (5 December 2015 – 7 May 2016)
- Longest winless run: 12 Matches – Manchester United U18s (3 October 2015 – 30 January 2016)
- Longest losing run: 12 Matches – Manchester United U18s (3 October 2015 – 30 January 2016)

The league was split into two regional divisions – north and south. After playing each team in their own division twice, the league was split into a second league stage consisting of three further divisions. The winning team of Group 1 in the second league stage was the overall champion and qualified for the UEFA Youth League in the 2016–17 season.

=== First League stage ===
==== North Division ====
Pos	Team	Pld	W	D	L	GF	GA	GD	Pts	Qualification
1	Manchester City U18s	22	14	6	2	53	23	+30	48	Group 1
2	Everton U18s	22	15	3	4	57	33	+24	48	Group 1
3	Liverpool U18s	22	13	4	5	45	28	+17	43	Group 1
4	Blackburn Rovers U18s	22	11	4	7	45	31	+14	37	Group 1
5	Sunderland U18s	22	11	3	8	44	40	+4	36	Group 2
6	Middlesbrough U18s	22	10	4	8	43	38	+5	34	Group 2
7	Wolverhampton Wanderers U18s	22	8	4	10	42	40	+2	28	Group 2
8	West Bromwich Albion U18s	22	7	4	11	29	44	−15	25	Group 2
9	Newcastle United U18s	22	6	2	14	27	59	−32	20	Group 3
10	Derby County U18s	22	3	9	10	39	51	−12	18	Group 3
11	Manchester United U18s	22	5	3	14	29	44	−15	18	Group 3
12	Stoke City U18s	22	4	4	14	23	45	−22	16	Group 3

==== South Division ====
Pos	Team	Pld	W	D	L	GF	GA	GD	Pts	Qualification
1	Chelsea U18s	22	15	5	2	65	27	+38	50	Group 1
2	Reading U18s	22	13	3	6	47	27	+20	42	Group 1
3	Fulham U18s	22	12	3	7	44	29	+15	39	Group 1
4	West Ham United U18s	22	11	4	7	30	29	+1	37	Group 1
5	Aston Villa U18s	22	11	3	8	42	34	+8	36	Group 2
6	Arsenal U18s	22	10	5	7	49	45	+4	35	Group 2
7	Leicester City U18s	22	9	5	8	39	37	+2	32	Group 2
8	Tottenham Hotspur U18s	22	9	4	9	43	40	+3	31	Group 2
9	Brighton & Hove Albion U18s	22	6	4	12	32	51	−19	22	Group 3
10	Norwich City U18s	22	6	3	13	28	48	−20	21	Group 3
11	Southampton U18s	22	4	3	15	34	57	−23	15	Group 3
12	Swansea City U18s	22	3	4	15	25	54	−29	13	Group 3

=== Second league stage ===
As of match played 7 May 2016

==== Group 1 ====
Pos	Team	Pld	W	D	L	GF	GA	GD	Pts	Qualification
1	Manchester City U18s	7	6	1	0	21	7	+14	19	Qualification for 2016–17 UEFA Youth League
2	Everton U18s	7	4	1	2	14	15	−1	13	
3	Chelsea U18s	7	3	2	2	16	13	+3	11	
4	Liverpool U18s	7	2	2	3	13	11	+2	8	
5	Blackburn Rovers U18s	7	2	2	3	9	9	0	8	
6	Fulham U18s	7	2	1	4	9	19	−10	7	
7	Reading U18s	7	1	2	4	9	13	−4	5	
8	West Ham United U18s	7	0	5	2	9	13	−4	5	

==== Group 2 ====
Pos	Team	Pld	W	D	L	GF	GA	GD	Pts
9	Middlesbrough U18s	7	6	1	0	14	6	+8	19
10	Sunderland U18s	7	4	1	2	14	8	+6	13
11	Leicester City U18s	7	3	3	1	16	11	+5	12
12	Aston Villa U18s	7	3	3	1	10	8	+2	12
13	Arsenal U18s	7	2	2	3	15	14	+1	8
14	Tottenham Hotspur U18s	7	2	1	4	15	17	−2	7
15	West Bromwich Albion U18s	7	1	2	4	8	13	−5	5
16	Wolverhampton Wanderers U18s	7	0	1	6	10	25	−15	1

==== Group 3 ====
Pos	Team	Pld	W	D	L	GF	GA	GD	Pts
17	Swansea City U18s	7	4	3	0	17	13	+4	15
18	Brighton & Hove Albion U18s	7	4	2	1	18	13	+5	14
19	Derby County U18s	7	4	1	2	17	10	+7	13
20	Manchester United U18s	7	4	1	2	17	12	+5	13
21	Stoke City U18s	7	3	1	3	12	12	0	10
22	Newcastle United U18s	7	2	1	4	9	18	−9	7
23	Southampton U18s	7	1	2	4	9	12	−3	5
24	Norwich City U18s	7	0	1	6	9	18	−9	1

=== Top goalscorers ===
As of 7 May 2016

Rank	Player	Club	Goals
1	(England) Edward Nketiah	Arsenal U18s	24
2	(Canada) Ike Ugbo	Chelsea U18s	22
3	(Germany) Lukas Nmecha	Manchester City U18s	20
4	(England) Mitchell Curry	Middlesbrough U18s	18
5	(Wales) Nathan Broadhead	Everton U18s	17
5	(England) Lewis Mansell	Blackburn Rovers U18s	17
7	(England) Sam Smith	Reading U18s	16
8	(Zimbabwe) Admiral Muskwe	Leicester City U18s	15
9	(England) Jordan Maguire-Drew	Brighton & Hove Albion U18s	14
9	(England) Daniel Pybus	Sunderland U18s	14
11	(England) Isaac Buckley	Manchester City U18s	13
11	(England) Ryan Loft	Tottenham Hotspur U18s	13

=== Hat-tricks ===
As of 7 May 2016

Player	For	Against	Result	Date	Ref.
(Canada) Ike Ugbo	Chelsea U18s	Norwich City U18s	1–4 (A)	8 August 2015	
(England) Jordan Maguire-Drew^{4}	Brighton & Hove Albion U18s	Swansea City U18s	6–0 (H)	15 August 2015	
(Guinea-Bissau) Toni Gomes	Liverpool U18s	Middlesbrough U18s	4–3 (H)	22 August 2015	
(England) Lewis Mansell	Blackburn Rovers U18s	Liverpool U18s	0–4 (A)	29 August 2015	
(England) Lewis McNall	Newcastle United U18s	Manchester United U18s	3–2 (H)	5 September 2015	
(England) Lewis Mansell	Blackburn Rovers U18s	Stoke City U18s	1–5 (A)	19 September 2015	
(Zimbabwe) Admiral Muskwe	Leicester City U18s	Reading U18s	3–3 (H)	26 September 2015	
(Zimbabwe) Admiral Muskwe	Leicester City U18s	Southampton U18s	5–1 (H)	3 October 2015	
(England) Ryan Loft	Tottenham Hotspur U18s	Norwich City U18s	0–3 (A)	10 October 2015	
(Wales) Nathan Broadhead	Everton U18s	West Bromwich Albion U18s	0–3 (A)	24 October 2015	
(Netherlands) Donyell Malen	Arsenal U18s	Reading U18s	4–3 (H)	31 October 2015	
(England) Josh Walker	Fulham U18s	Leicester City U18s	6–1 (H)	7 November 2015	
(England) Delial Brewster	Everton U18s	Manchester United U18s	4–2 (H)	7 November 2015	
(Canada) Ike Ugbo	Chelsea U18s	Southampton U18s	2–7 (A)	14 November 2015	
(England) Sam Smith	Reading U18s	Swansea City U18s	3–2 (H)	14 November 2015	
(England) Dennis Adeniran	Fulham U18s	Tottenham Hotspur U18s	5–3 (H)	14 November 2015	
(Democratic Republic of the Congo) Grady Diangana	West Ham United U18s	Norwich City U18s	3–4 (H)	21 November 2015	
(Romania) Nicolae Carnat	Wolverhampton Wanderers U18s	Everton U18s	0–8 (A)	28 November 2015	
(England) Isaac Buckley	Manchester City U18s	Derby County U18s	7–2 (H)	5 December 2015	
(England) Antony Evans	Everton U18s	Newcastle United U18s	0–8 (A)	6 February 2016	
(Northern Ireland) Shayne Lavery	Everton U18s	Newcastle United U18s	0–8 (A)	6 February 2016	
(Wales) Nathan Broadhead	Everton U18s	Derby County U18s	3–1 (H)	20 February 2016	
(Guinea-Bissau) Toni Gomes	Liverpool U18s	Sunderland U18s	5–0 (H)	23 February 2016	
(England) Reece Meekums	Brighton & Hove Albion U18s	Norwich City U18s	2–5 (A)	27 February 2016	
(England) Harvey Barnes	Leicester City U18s	Wolverhampton Wanderers U18s	2–7 (A)	27 February 2016	
(Belgium) Julien Ngoy	Stoke City U18s	Derby County U18s	3–3 (A)	5 March 2016	
(Belgium) Indy Boonen	Manchester United U18s	Newcastle United U18s	7–1 (H)	9 April 2016	
(England) Dan N'Lundulu	Southampton U18s	Norwich City U18s	3–1 (H)	9 April 2016	
(England) Elliot Embleton	Sunderland U18s	West Bromwich Albion U18s	1–4 (A)	16 April 2016	
(England) Edward Nketiah	Arsenal U18s	Tottenham Hotspur U18s	3–3 (H)	30 April 2016	
(England) Daniel Pybus	Sunderland U18s	Wolverhampton Wanderers U18s	3–3 (H)	30 April 2016	
(England) Daniel Butterworth	Blackburn Rovers U18s	Chelsea U18s	3–0 (H)	7 May 2016	

Note

(H) – Home; (A) – Away
^{4} – player scored 4 goals

== League 2 ==
Professional Development U18 League
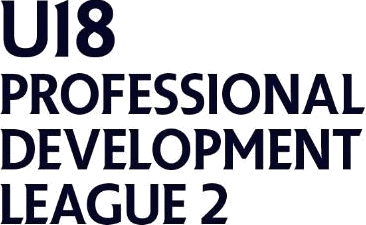
- Season: 2015–16
- Champions: Charlton Athletic U18s (2nd Title)
- Matches: 313 (310 RS, 3 PO)
- Goals: 1,148 (3.67 per match) (1,138 RS, 10 PO)
- Top goalscorer: (Chile) Ben Brereton Nottingham Forest U18s, (Northern Ireland) Ronan Hale Birmingham City U18s (28 Goals Each)
- Biggest home win: Charlton Athletic U18s 9–0 Queens Park Rangers U18s (29 August 2015)
- Biggest away win: Coventry City U18s 0–7 Huddersfield Town U18s (27 February 2016)
- Highest scoring: Queens Park Rangers U18s 9–2 Barnsley U18s (26 September 2015)
- Longest winning run: 10 Matches – Nottingham Forest U18s (19 December 2015 – 26 March 2016); Watford U18s (28 November 2015 – 16 April 2016)
- Longest unbeaten run: 15 Matches – Nottingham Forest U18s (30 October 2015 – 26 March 2016)
- Longest winless run: 12 Matches – Barnsley U18s (8 August 2015 – 10 October 2015)
- Longest losing run: 7 Matches – Leeds United U18s (17 October 2015 – 30 January 2016)

League 2, referred to as the Professional Development U18 League, is split into two regional divisions.

Teams will play each team in their own division twice, and each team in the other division once, for a total of 30 games for North division teams, and 29 games each for South division teams.

At the end of the season, the teams finishing in the top two positions of both divisions will meet in the knockout stage to determine the overall league champion. 21 teams competed this season, 2 more than last season. Hull City U18s and Watford U18s were promoted to Category 2 Academy status joining the league this year. Hull City played in the North, and Watford played in the South.

=== North Division table ===
Pos	Team	Pld	W	D	L	GF	GA	GD	Pts	Qualification
1	Nottingham Forest U18s	30	23	2	5	78	35	+43	71	Qualification for Knock-out stage
2	Sheffield United U18s	30	19	2	9	68	39	+29	59	Qualification for Knock-out stage
3	Huddersfield Town U18s	30	18	3	9	73	52	+21	57	
4	Crewe Alexandra U18s	30	17	5	8	70	52	+18	56	
5	Birmingham City U18s	30	14	6	10	66	53	+13	48	
6	Sheffield Wednesday U18s	30	14	4	12	60	46	+14	46	
7	Coventry City U18s	30	14	4	12	69	77	−8	46	
8	Bolton Wanderers U18s	30	13	4	13	51	54	−3	43	
9	Leeds United U18s	30	11	5	14	50	52	−2	38	
10	Hull City U18s	30	8	1	21	36	82	−46	25	
11	Barnsley U18s	30	2	9	19	46	83	−37	15	

=== South Division table ===
Pos	Team	Pld	W	D	L	GF	GA	GD	Pts	Qualification
1	Watford U18s	29	15	11	3	42	23	+19	56	Qualification for Knock-out stage
2	Charlton Athletic U18s	29	15	6	8	64	35	+29	51	Qualification for Knock-out stage
3	Crystal Palace U18s	29	12	9	8	54	43	+11	45	
4	Ipswich Town U18s	29	12	3	14	57	56	+1	39	
5	Cardiff City U18s	29	11	4	14	48	52	−4	37	
6	Millwall U18s	29	10	7	12	30	41	−11	37	
7	Colchester United U18s	29	9	8	12	48	53	−5	35	
8	Brentford U18s	29	7	5	17	49	71	−22	26	
9	Queens Park Rangers U18s	29	7	3	19	41	82	−41	24	
10	Bristol City U18s	29	5	7	17	38	57	−19	22	

=== Knock-out stage ===
==== Semifinals ====
23 April 2016

Watford U18s	1–3	Sheffield United U18s
Folivi 67'		Thomas 65' (o.g.); Hall 72'; Crofts 74'

Vicarage Road, Watford

27 April 2016
19:00

Nottingham Forest U18s	2–2 (a.e.t.)	Charlton Athletic U18s
Gamblen 46'; Brereton 90+9'	Report	Ahearne-Grant 11' (pen.); Bah 59'
Penalties
Brereton (penalty scored); Edser (penalty scored); Yates (penalty missed); Gabriel (penalty scored); Gamblen (penalty missed)	3–4	(penalty scored) Millar; (penalty scored) Ahearne-Grant; (penalty scored) Lapslie; (penalty missed) Bone; (penalty scored) Konsa

City Ground, West Bridgford
Referee: Lisa Rashid

==== Final ====
9 May 2016

Charlton Athletic U18s	1–1 (a.e.t.)	Sheffield United U18s
Ahearne-Grant 89'		Hallam 6'
Penalties
Ahearne-Grant (penalty scored); Bone (penalty scored); Lapslie (penalty scored); Konsa (penalty scored)	4–3	(penalty scored) Brown; (penalty scored) Ramsdale; (penalty scored) Semple; (penalty missed) Litchfield; (penalty missed) Gordon

The Valley, London

=== Top goalscorers ===
As of 9 May 2016

Rank	Player	Club	Goals
1	(Chile) Ben Brereton	Nottingham Forest U18s	28
1	(Northern Ireland) Ronan Hale	Birmingham City U18s	28
3	(England) Jordan Hallam	Sheffield United U18s	24
4	(England) Ben Morris	Ipswich Town U18s	21
5	(England) Jack Boyle	Huddersfield Town U18s	18
6	(England) Michael Folivi	Watford U18s	17
6	(Iran) Alex Samizadeh	Bolton Wanderers U18s	17
8	(England) Owen Dale	Crewe Alexandra U18s	16
9	(France) Virgil Gomis	Nottingham Forest U18s	15
9	(England) Levi Lumeka	Crystal Palace U18s	15
9	(England) Mallik Wilks	Leeds United U18s	15

=== Hat-tricks ===
As of 9 May 2016

Player	For	Against	Result	Date	Ref.
(Iran) Alex Samizadeh	Bolton Wanderers U18s	Colchester United U18s	2–4 (A)	15 August 2015	
(England) Callum Ainley	Crewe Alexandra U18s	Hull City U18s	3–0 (H)	22 August 2015	
(England) Suliaman Bah	Charlton Athletic U18s	Queens Park Rangers U18s	9–0 (H)	29 August 2015	
(Nigeria) Ademola Lookman^{4}	Charlton Athletic U18s	Queens Park Rangers U18s	9–0 (H)	29 August 2015	
(Romania) David Popa	Birmingham City U18s	Hull City U18s	4–5 (A)	29 August 2015	
(England) Jack Boyle	Huddersfield Town U18s	Bolton Wanderers U18s	3–4 (A)	2 September 2015	
(Nigeria) Ademola Lookman	Charlton Athletic U18s	Huddersfield Town U18s	0–4 (A)	5 September 2015	
(England) Mallik Wilks^{4}	Charlton Athletic U18s	Queens Park Rangers U18s	9–2 (A)	5 September 2015	
(England) Jack Boyle	Huddersfield Town U18s	Hull City U18s	7–0 (H)	17 October 2015	
(England) Jack Boyle	Huddersfield Town U18s	Crewe Alexandra U18s	4–4 (A)	31 October 2015	
(England) Bassala Sambou^{4}	Coventry City U18s	Birmingham City U18s	1–5 (A)	31 October 2015	
(England) Eoin McKeown^{4}	Colchester United U18s	Queens Park Rangers U18s	8–1 (H)	14 November 2015	
(England) Owen Dale	Crewe Alexandra U18s	Hull City U18s	2–5 (A)	12 December 2015	
(England) Cedwyn Scott	Huddersfield Town U18s	Bolton Wanderers U18s	5–1 (H)	19 December 2015	
(England) Jordan Hallam	Sheffield United U18s	Crewe Alexandra U18s	4–3 (H)	9 January 2016	
(Wales) Jamie Bird	Cardiff City U18s	Crystal Palace U18s	5–0 (H)	16 January 2016	
(England) Tyler Smith	Sheffield United U18s	Bolton Wanderers U18s	6–0 (H)	23 January 2016	
(Northern Ireland) Ronan Hale^{4}	Birmingham City U18s	Coventry City U18s	2–4 (A)	30 January 2016	
(Northern Ireland) Ronan Hale^{5}	Birmingham City U18s	Leeds United U18s	2–6 (A)	13 February 2016	
(Australia) Adam Edgar	Huddersfield Town U18s	Coventry City U18s	0–7 (A)	27 February 2016	
(England) Luca Colville	Huddersfield Town U18s	Coventry City U18s	0–7 (A)	27 February 2016	
(England) Levi Lumeka	Crystal Palace U18s	Queens Park Rangers U18s	1–6 (A)	12 March 2016	
(England) Jordan Hallam	Sheffield United U18s	Huddersfield Town U18s	0–5 (A)	24 March 2016	
(England) Bassala Sambou	Coventry City U18s	Barnsley U18s	5–4 (H)	25 March 2016	
(Northern Ireland) Ronan Hale	Birmingham City U18s	Sheffield Wednesday U18s	1–3 (A)	2 April 2016	
(England) Ben Morris	Ipswich Town U18s	Cardiff City U18s	6–0 (H)	14 April 2016	

Note

(H) – Home; (A) – Away
^{4} – player scored 4 goals ^{5} – player scored 5 goals

== League 3 ==
Football League Youth Alliance
- Season: 2015–16
- Champions: North-East Division; Mansfield Town U18s; North-West Division; Wigan Athletic U18s; South-East Division; Luton Town U18s; South-West Division; Plymouth Argyle U18s; Merit League One; Leyton Orient U18s; Merit League Two; Oxford United U18s
- Matches: 698
- Goals: 2,438 (3.49 per match)

League 3 is run by the Football League under the auspices of the Football League Youth Alliance. 50 teams entered the competition this season, 2 fewer than the previous season. Hull City U18s and Watford U18s were promoted to Category 2 Academy status, and Torquay United U18s left the league. Yeovil Town U18s joined the league this season.

=== League stage ===
As of match played 26 January 2016

==== North-West Division ====
Pos	Team	Pld	W	D	L	GF	GA	GD	Pts
1	Wigan Athletic U18s (C)	28	20	3	5	59	19	+40	63
2	Bury U18s	28	18	7	3	66	28	+38	61
3	Walsall U18s	28	15	5	8	54	31	+23	50
4	Tranmere Rovers U18s	28	15	4	9	49	34	+15	49
5	Blackpool U18s	28	12	8	8	51	36	+15	44
6	Shrewsbury Town U18s	28	13	5	10	41	32	+9	44
7	Preston North End U18s	28	13	3	12	42	42	0	42
8	Port Vale U18s	28	10	7	11	33	33	0	37
9	Rochdale U18s	28	10	6	12	40	44	−4	36
10	Accrington Stanley U18s	28	10	6	12	36	48	−12	36
11	Fleetwood Town U18s	28	10	6	12	33	51	−18	36
12	Wrexham U18s	28	9	6	13	44	55	−11	33
13	Carlisle United U18s	28	8	4	16	39	50	−11	28
14	Burnley U18s	28	6	2	20	33	68	−35	20
15	Morecambe U18s	28	4	2	22	29	78	−49	14

Source: soccerway.com
(C) Champions

==== North-East Division ====
Pos	Team	Pld	W	D	L	GF	GA	GD	Pts
1	Mansfield Town U18s (C)	24	14	4	6	36	26	+10	46
2	Scunthorpe United U18s	24	12	6	6	39	31	+8	42
3	Hartlepool United U18s	24	12	4	8	46	39	+7	40
4	Doncaster Rovers U18s	24	11	7	6	33	27	+6	40
5	Chesterfield U18s	24	11	5	8	67	51	+16	38
6	Notts County U18s	24	12	2	10	44	37	+7	38
7	Rotherham United U18s	24	10	6	8	43	37	+6	36
8	Burton Albion U18s	24	10	5	9	39	37	+2	35
9	Lincoln City U18s	24	10	4	10	32	38	−6	34
10	Oldham Athletic U18s	24	10	2	12	51	39	+12	32
11	Bradford City U18s	24	9	3	12	36	49	−13	30
12	Grimsby Town U18s	24	5	3	16	28	58	−30	18
13	York City U18s	24	2	5	17	30	55	−25	11

Source: soccerway.com
(C) Champions

==== South-West Division ====
Pos	Team	Pld	W	D	L	GF	GA	GD	Pts	Qualification
1	Plymouth Argyle U18s (C)	18	12	3	3	39	24	+15	39	Merit League One
2	Cheltenham Town U18s	18	10	2	6	42	28	+14	32	Merit League One
3	AFC Bournemouth U18s	18	9	4	5	30	22	+8	31	Merit League One
4	Exeter City U18s	18	8	3	7	31	33	−2	27	Merit League One
5	Portsmouth U18s	18	8	2	8	39	31	+8	26	Merit League One
6	Oxford United U18s	18	8	1	9	35	36	−1	25	Merit League Two
7	Swindon Town U18s	18	7	3	8	34	36	−2	24	Merit League Two
8	Bristol Rovers U18s	18	5	6	7	23	30	−7	21	Merit League Two
9	Newport County U18s	18	5	3	10	27	44	−17	18	Merit League Two
10	Yeovil Town U18s	18	4	1	13	21	37	−16	13	Merit League Two

Source: soccerway.com
(C) Champions

==== South-East Division ====
Pos	Team	Pld	W	D	L	GF	GA	GD	Pts	Qualification
1	Luton Town U18s (C)	22	17	2	3	57	15	+42	53	Merit League One
2	Southend United U18s	22	14	0	8	47	37	+10	42	Merit League One
3	Leyton Orient U18s	22	12	5	5	49	21	+28	41	Merit League One
4	Barnet U18s	22	12	2	8	55	39	+16	38	Merit League One
5	AFC Wimbledon U18s	22	12	2	8	42	37	+5	38	Merit League One
6	Gillingham U18s	22	11	4	7	49	43	+6	37	Merit League One
7	Stevenage U18s	22	8	3	11	35	52	−17	27	Merit League Two
8	Northampton Town U18s	22	8	2	12	39	43	−4	26	Merit League Two
9	Milton Keynes Dons U18s	22	8	1	13	44	63	−19	25	Merit League Two
10	Dagenham & Redbridge U18s	22	7	0	15	36	54	−18	21	Merit League Two
11	Peterborough United U18s	22	6	2	14	37	63	−26	20	Merit League Two
12	Cambridge United U18s	22	4	3	15	34	57	−23	15	Merit League Two

Source: soccerway.com
(C) Champions

=== Merit League Stage ===
The teams in the Southeast and Southwest Divisions played another ten games to determine the champions of Merit League One and Merit League Two.

==== Merit League One ====
Pos	Team	Pld	W	D	L	GF	GA	GD	Pts
1	Leyton Orient U18s (C)	10	9	1	0	23	3	+20	28
2	Portsmouth U18s	10	5	3	2	24	18	+6	18
3	AFC Wimbledon U18s	10	5	3	2	22	16	+6	18
4	AFC Bournemouth U18s	10	5	2	3	20	13	+7	17
5	Luton Town U18s	10	4	2	4	12	11	+1	14
6	Exeter City U18s	10	4	2	4	17	19	−2	14
7	Cheltenham Town U18s	10	4	1	5	21	26	−5	13
8	Gillingham U18s	10	3	1	6	9	17	−8	10
9	Southend United U18s	10	2	3	5	14	19	−5	9
10	Plymouth Argyle U18s	10	2	1	7	16	24	−8	7
11	Barnet U18s	10	2	1	7	13	25	−12	7

(C) Champions

==== Merit League Two ====
Pos	Team	Pld	W	D	L	GF	GA	GD	Pts
1	Oxford United U18s (C)	10	9	0	1	32	9	+23	27
2	Cambridge United U18s	10	6	1	3	22	14	+8	19
3	Milton Keynes Dons U18s	10	6	1	3	29	23	+6	19
4	Newport County U18s	10	5	1	4	20	23	−3	16
5	Stevenage U18s	10	4	2	4	16	16	0	14
6	Yeovil Town U18s	10	4	2	4	16	20	−4	14
7	Swindon Town U18s	10	4	1	5	25	20	+5	13
8	Dagenham & Redbridge U18s	10	4	1	5	26	28	−2	13
9	Northampton Town U18s	10	3	3	4	21	15	+6	12
10	Peterborough United U18s	10	3	1	6	15	26	−11	10
11	Bristol Rovers U18s	10	0	1	9	7	35	−28	1

(C) Champions

== See also ==
- 2015–16 Professional U21 Development League
- 2015–16 FA Cup
- 2015–16 FA Youth Cup
- 2015–16 in English football
