= Football League Youth Alliance =

- Founded: 1997
- Country: England
- Other club from: Wales
- Divisions: 4
- Promotion to: Professional Development League
- Relegation to: The Football Conference Youth Alliance
- League cup: Football League Youth Alliance Cup FA Youth Cup
- Current champions: Bradford City (North East) Preston North End (North West) Plymouth Argyle (South) (2021–22)

The Football League Youth Alliance is a youth football competition in England, consisting of two regional divisions. It acts as League 2 of the U18 Professional Development League system.

== Current structure ==
=== North ===
- Blackpool
- Bolton Wanderers
- Bradford City
- Burton Albion
- Carlisle United
- Chesterfield
- Doncaster Rovers
- Grimsby Town
- Lincoln City
- Mansfield Town
- Morecambe
- Notts County
- Oldham Athletic
- Port Vale
- Preston North End
- Rotherham United
- Salford City
- Shrewsbury Town
- Stockport County
- Walsall
- Wrexham

=== South ===
- AFC Wimbledon
- Barnet
- Bristol Rovers
- Bromley
- Cambridge United
- Cheltenham Town
- Exeter City
- Forest Green Rovers
- Gillingham
- Leyton Orient
- Luton Town
- MK Dons
- Newport County
- Northampton Town
- Oxford United
- Plymouth Argyle
- Portsmouth
- Stevenage
- Sutton United
- Swindon Town
- Wycombe Wanderers

== Recent champions ==
Season	Division One North Conference	Division Two North Conference	Division Three North Conference	Division Four North Conference	Division One South Conference	Division Two South Conference	Division Three South Conference
1998–99	Sheffield United	Northampton Town	Stoke City	Notts County	Was Not Completed	Was Not Completed	Was Not Completed
1999–00	Bury	Scarborough	Halifax Town	Was Not Completed	Brighton & Hove Albion	Wycombe Wanderers	Shrewsbury Town
2000–01	Doncaster Rovers	Notts County	Carlisle United	Hull City	Leyton Orient	Luton Town	Torquay United
2001–02	Tranmere Rovers	Oldham Athletic	Doncaster Rovers	Not Contested	Brentford	Rushden & Diamonds	Notts County
2002–03	Tranmere Rovers	Oldham Athletic	Wrexham	Not Contested	Brentford	Brighton & Hove Albion	Swansea City
2003–04	Oldham Athletic	Stockport County	Bury	Not Contested	Cambridge United	Portsmouth	Leyton Orient
2004–05	Oldham Athletic	Rotherham United	Preston North End	Not Contested	Cambridge United	Portsmouth	Northampton Town

Season	North & Midlands West Conference	North & Midlands East Conference	South West Conference	South East Conference
2005–06	Oldham Athletic	Chesterfield	Yeovil Town	Brighton & Hove Albion
2006–07	Oldham Athletic	Hull City	Oxford United	Queens Park Rangers

Season	Merit League	North West Conference	North East Conference	South West Conference	South East Conference
2007–08	Not contested	Walsall	Hull City	Plymouth Argyle	Queens Park Rangers
2008–09	Not contested	Wrexham	Chesterfield	Swindon Town	Southend United
2009–10	Not contested	Preston North End	Hull City	Swindon Town	Millwall
2010–11	Not contested	Rochdale	Chesterfield	Swindon Town	Queens Park Rangers
2011–12	Not contested	Preston North End	Hull City	Plymouth Argyle	Queens Park Rangers
2012–13	Not contested	Wrexham	Hull City	Bristol Rovers	Portsmouth
2013–14	Not contested	Blackpool	Bradford City	Exeter City	Colchester United
2014–15	Not contested	Bury	Bradford City	AFC Bournemouth	Barnet
2015–16	Leyton Orient	Wigan Athletic	Mansfield Town	Plymouth Argyle	Luton Town
2016–17	Newport County	Blackpool	Mansfield Town	Exeter City	Leyton Orient
2017–18	Gillingham	Rochdale	Mansfield Town	Exeter City	Milton Keynes Dons
2018–19	Southend United	Wigan Athletic	Grimsby Town	Oxford United	Northampton Town
2019–20	(not completed)	Preston North End	Doncaster Rovers	AFC Bournemouth	Peterborough United

Season	Merit League One	Merit League Two	Merit League Three	North West Conference	North East Conference	South West Conference	South East Conference
2020–21	Plymouth Argyle	Southend United	AFC Bournemouth	Fleetwood Town	Notts County	Oxford United	Peterborough United

Season	Merit League	North West Conference	North East Conference	South West Conference	South East Conference
2021–22	Plymouth Argyle	Preston North End	Bradford City	AFC Bournemouth	AFC Wimbledon

Season	Merit League One	Merit League Two	North West Conference	North East Conference	North East Conference Second Stage Top Half	North East Conference Second Stage Bottom Half	South West Conference	South East Conference
2022–23	Luton Town	Northampton Town	Blackpool	Harrogate Town	Bradford City	Mansfield Town	AFC Bournemouth	Luton Town
2023–24	Plymouth Argyle	Brentford	Preston North End	Mansfield Town	Mansfield Town	Grimsby Town	Plymouth Argyle	Luton Town

Season	North	South	Play off Final
2024–25	Bolton Wanderers	Luton Town	Bolton Wanderers

Season	North West Conference	North East Conference	South West Conference	South East Conference	North	South	Play off Final
2025–26	Shrewsbury Town	Grimsby Town	Oxford United	AFC Wimbledon	Shrewsbury Town	AFC Wimbledon	AFC Wimbledon

== Youth Alliance Cup ==
The Youth Alliance also operates a cup competition known as the Football League Youth Alliance Cup.

=== Winners ===
Season	Winners	Runners-up	Final result	Venue
1999–00	West Bromwich Albion	Scunthorpe United	0–0 West Bromwich Albion win 3–2 on penalties	Wembley Stadium
2000–01	Leyton Orient	Bradford City	1–0	Millennium Stadium
2001–02	Walsall	Notts County	2–0	Bescot Stadium
2002–03	Tranmere Rovers	Northampton Town	3–0	Sixfields Stadium
2003–04	Cardiff City	Tranmere Rovers	6–1	Prenton Park
2004–05	Swindon Town	Burnley	1–1 Swindon Town win 4–3 on penalties	Turf Moor
2005–06	Preston North End	Colchester United	5–2 AET	Layer Road
2006–07	Stockport County	Colchester United	5–2	Edgeley Park
2007–08	Hull City	Colchester United	3–0	Layer Road
2008–09	Grimsby Town	Queens Park Rangers	2–1	Loftus Road
2009–10	Queens Park Rangers	Stockport County	4–3	Loftus Road
2010–11	Wycombe Wanderers	Darlington	0–0 Wycombe win 4–2 on penalties	Adams Park
2011–12	Doncaster Rovers	Exeter City	4–0	St. James Park
2012–13	Bristol Rovers	Carlisle United	3–1	Brunton Park
2013–14	Colchester United	Bradford City	4–2	Valley Parade
2014–15	Oldham Athletic	Milton Keynes Dons	4–0	Boundary Park
2015–16	Luton Town	Shrewsbury Town	2–1	New Meadow
2016–17	AFC Bournemouth	Wigan Athletic	4–2	DW Stadium
2017–18	Luton Town	Wigan Athletic	1–0	Kenilworth Road
2018–19	Wigan Athletic	Exeter City	2–0	St. James Park
2019–20	AFC Wimbledon	Rotherham United	1–0	New York Stadium
2020–21	Rochdale	Gillingham	3–0	Priestfield Stadium
2021–22	Preston North End	Luton Town	4–1	Kenilworth Road
2022–23	Milton Keynes Dons	Rotherham United	2–0	Stadium MK
2023–24	Preston North End	Portsmouth	3–1	Fratton Park
2024–25	Burton Albion	Bromley	1–0	Hayes Lane
2025–26	AFC Wimbledon	Blackpool	1–1 AFC Wimbledon win 4–1 on penalties	Bloomfield Road

== See also ==
- Premier Academy League
- FA Youth Cup
- The Central League
- The Football Combination
- The Football League
- The Football Conference Youth Alliance
