= The Football Conference Youth Alliance =

- Founded: 2005
- Country: England
- Divisions: 6
- Number of clubs: 70
- Promotion to: Football League Youth Alliance
- Domestic cup: FA Youth Cup

The Football Conference Youth Alliance (known sometimes as the Conference Youth Alliance) was formed in 2005 as the official U19s Youth League for professional teams, semi-professional and for non-league teams who compete in the Football Conference league and respective non-league competitions in England. Teams who compete in the Football Conference Youth Alliance combine football training with education, offering 16-18 year olds the chance to play elite youth football at U19s level and gain academic qualifications at BTEC National or Diploma level, operating on a similar model to that of the Football League Youth Alliance and FA Premier Academy League.

The league comprises seven divisions (North, Central, Southern Premier and Southern A, B, and C). The title winners of each of the seven Football Conference Youth Alliance divisions go into a Championship Play Off to find the National Football Conference Youth Alliance Champion each season.

== Current structure ==
- See Youth Alliance Page for 2011–12 season league tables.

The competition is currently (as of 2011–12) contested by 70 clubs, split into six regional conferences: North (10 teams), Central (12 teams), South Premier (12 teams), South A (12 teams), South B (12 teams) and South C (12 teams).

=== North Division ===
- Birmingham City Blues
- Boston United
- FC Halifax Town
- Fleetwood Town
- Gateshead
- Ilkeston
- MMU/Newcastle
- Newcastle Town
- Stalybridge Celtic

=== Central Division ===
- Birmingham City Whites
- Chasetown
- Corby Town
- FootballCV Reds
- Hitchin Town
- Kettering Town
- Kidderminster Harriers
- Luton Town
- Oxford City
- St Albans City
- Tamworth
- Watford Trust & Hertswood School

=== South Premier Division ===
- AFC Sudbury
- AFC Wimbledon
- Basingstoke Town
- Bromley Blues
- Dartford Whites
- Dover Athletic
- Ebbsfleet United
- Havant & Waterlooville
- Histon
- Oxford United
- Woking
- Weston-super-Mare

=== South A Division ===
- Boreham Wood Whites
- Carshalton Athletic
- Eastleigh
- Hampton & Richmond Borough
- JMA Reading
- Kingstonian
- Leatherhead
- St Albans Saints
- Tooting & Mitcham United
- Watford FC Community Sports & Education Trust
- Wealdstone
- Wingate & Finchley

=== South B Division ===
- Boreham Wood Blues
- Bishops Stortford
- Chelmsford City
- Dagenham & Redbridge
- Halstead Town
- Redbridge
- Romford
- Tilbury
- Thurrock
- Tottenham Hotspur
- Waltham Abbey
- Winchmore Hill

=== South C Division ===
- Bromley Whites
- Cambridge United
- Charlton Athletic Trust
- Cray Wanderers
- Croydon Athletic
- Dartford Reds
- Deal Town
- Dulwich Hamlet
- Maidstone United
- Sittingbourne
- Tonbridge Angels
- Welling United

== See also ==
- Premier Academy League
- FA Youth Cup
- The Central League
- The Football Combination
- The Football League
