= Isaac Rice (footballer) =

English footballer

Personal information
- Full name: Isaac Kaempfe Rice
- Date of birth: 30 September 2000 (age 26)
- Place of birth: Lincoln, England
- Height: 6 ft 1 in (1.86 m)
- Position: Defender

Team information
- Current team: Lincoln City (PDP lead coach)

Youth career
- 2014–2018: Sheffield Wednesday

Senior career*
Years	Team	Apps	(Gls)
2018–2021	Sheffield Wednesday	1	(0)
2021–2023	Gainsborough Trinity	58	(1)
- * Club domestic league appearances and goals as of 10:00, 21 February 2023 (UTC)

Isaac Kaempfe Rice (born 30 September 2000) is an English retired professional footballer who played as a defender. He is now a PDP Lead Coach at Lincoln City.

== Playing career ==
On 19 December 2018, Rice signed his first professional contract with Sheffield Wednesday. Rice made his professional debut with Sheffield Wednesday in a 2-0 FA Cup win over Exeter City F.C. on 9 January 2021. On 12 May 2021, it was announced that Rice would be released at the end of his contract.

On 19 August 2021, he signed for Gainsborough Trinity following a brief spell with Newark where he had also appeared in the FA Cup.

== Coaching career ==
He joined Lincoln City F.C. Academy in 2021 on a part-time basis before moving into a full-time dual role as assistant youth development phase lead, alongside University of Lincoln coach.

== Career statistics ==
As of match played 9 January 2021

Appearances and goals by club, season and competition
Club	Season	League			FA Cup		League Cup		Other		Total	
Club	Season	Division	Apps	Goals	Apps	Goals	Apps	Goals	Apps	Goals	Apps	Goals
Sheffield Wednesday	2020–21	Championship	0	0	1	0	0	0	0	0	1	0
Career total			0	0	1	0	0	0	0	0	1	0
