= Lincoln City F.C. Academy =

Coordinates: 53.414°N 1.507°W

Lincoln City Academy
- Full name: Lincoln City Football Club Youth Academy
- Nickname: The Imps
- Head of Academy: Calum Oakenfold
- League: Youth Alliance North

The Lincoln City Academy is the youth system of Lincoln City. They have an established EFL Category 3 Academy whose U18 side competes in the Youth Alliance North league.

== Players ==
=== Under-18s ===
As of 30 September 2026

Note: Flags indicate national team as defined under FIFA eligibility rules; some limited exceptions apply. Players may hold more than one non-FIFA nationality.

No.	Pos.	Nation	Player
—	GK	ENG	Isaac Shaw
—	GK	ENG	Jaden Taylor
—	DF	ENG	Tariro Darikwa
—	DF	ENG	Fletcher Don-Duncan
—	DF	ENG	Lynden Huggins
—	DF	ENG	Lewy Oliver
—	DF	ENG	Leo Vout
—	DF	ENG	Freddie Wilson

No.	Pos.	Nation	Player
—	MF	ENG	Donald Inyama
—	MF	ENG	Josh Kennealey
—	MF	ENG	Kian Sagoo
—	MF	ENG	Prem Sidhu
—	FW	ENG	Leo Fifield
—	FW	ENG	Gael Mande
—	FW	ENG	Sam Male
—	FW	ENG	Alex McNicholas

== Academy staff ==
As of 23 September 2026

Role	Name
Head of academy	(England) Calum Oakenfold
Head of coaching	(England) Steve Welsh
PDP lead coach	(England) Sam Tillen
YDP lead coach	(England) Isaac Rice
Lead foundation phase lead coach	(England) Iona Lawson
Designated safeguarding and welfare officer	(England) Mark Johnson
Lead strength and conditioning coach	(England) Jack Parker
Academy sport psychologist	(England) Trish Jackson
Education manager	(England) Helen Oakenfold
Academy goalkeeping coach	(England) Jordan Wildey
Lead YDP coach	(England) Simon Noakes
Player care manager	(England) Kaitlyn Marcus
Head of academy recruitment	(England) Fin McKenna

== Graduates ==
The following list includes players who have graduated from Lincoln City's youth system to make their senior debut for the first team. Players who currently represent the Lincoln City senior team are highlighted in italics. Players who have represented their national team at senior level are highlighted in bold.

As of 16 May 2026

- (England) Matt Carbon
- (England) Ellis Chapman
- (England) Freddie Draper
- (Republic of Ireland) Lee Frecklington
- (Republic of Ireland) Oisin Gallagher
- (England) Jack Hobbs
- (Scotland) Sam Long
- (England) Jovon Makama
- (United States) Zane Okoro
- (Republic of Ireland) Sean Roughan
