= Doncaster Rovers F.C. Academy =

Coordinates: 53°30′35.1″N 1°06′50.0″W

Doncaster Rovers Academy
- Full name: Doncaster Rovers Football Club Academy
- Nicknames: The Rovers; Donny; The Vikings
- Short name: DRFC
- Ground: Cantley Park
- Manager: Tony Cook
- League: Football League Youth Alliance, North East Conference

Doncaster Rovers Academy is the youth team run by Doncaster Rovers to encourage and develop young footballers in South Yorkshire.

The youth team runs 9 teams and has over 100 players from the ages of 8 to 17. Stuart Swift is the current academy manager and joined the club in March 2023. The academy team plays in the Football League Youth Alliance, North East Conference and is only for players below the age of 18. Home games are played at the club's training ground at Cantley Park.

The role of the Doncaster Rovers Academy is to develop players and their abilities to their full potential for the club's first team. Rovers youth team were runners-up of the FA Youth Cup in 1988 and the winners of the Youth Alliance Cup in 2012. The youth system currently has Category 3 status but with future plans to achieve Category 2 status Academy in the Elite Player Performance Plan which would make Doncaster one of the few teams outside the Premier League with Category 2 status.

== Current squad ==
Note: Flags indicate national team as defined under FIFA eligibility rules; some limited exceptions apply. Players may hold more than one non-FIFA nationality.

No.	Pos.	Nation	Player
38	MF	ENG	Alex Pavan
39	DF	ENG	Lincoln Pawlak
43	MF	ENG	Ethan Hodgett

No.	Pos.	Nation	Player
46	MF	ENG	Jonny Tomlinson
48	MF	ENG	Ashton Swales
50	FW	ENG	Dylan Hartley

Players listed in bold have signed a professional deal with Doncaster Rovers but are still eligible to play for the U18's.

== Staff ==
Role	Name
Academy Manager	Stuart Swift
Professional Development Lead	Paul Green
Head of Coaching	Ebun Thomas
Head of Player Development	Josh Law
Foundation Lead Coach - 7 -12	Dillon Sandiford
Head of Goalkeeping	Steve Hernandez

== Age Groups ==
There are currently 9 squads at the Academy.

- Under 18
- Under 16
- Under 15
- Under 14
- Under 13
- Under 12
- Under 11
- Under 10
- Under 9

== Notable Academy Graduates ==
The following are players from Doncaster's academy team past or present who have gone on to play in the top 2 tiers of the Football League, or the top tier in another country with prominent national leagues.

- (England) Kevin Bird
- (England) Rufus Brevett
- (England) Stan Brookes
- (England) Brian Deane
- (England) Mike Elwiss
- (England) Ron Flowers
- (Republic of Ireland) Paul Green
- (England) Darius Henderson
- (England) James Husband
- (England) Alick Jeffrey
- (England) Brian Makepeace
- (England) Mark Rankine
- (England) Paul Raven
- (England) Glynn Snodin
- (England) Ian Snodin
- (England) Neil Woods
