= Walsall F.C. Youth and Reserves =

WFC Development Squad
- Full name: Walsall Development Squad
- Nickname: The Saddlers
- Ground: Ray Hall Lane, Birmingham; Bescot Stadium, Walsall
- Chairman: Leigh Pomlett
- Manager: Dev. Squad: (Spain) Miguel Llera; Academy: (England) Kyle Kirby
- League: Dev. Squad: Central League NW; Academy: Youth Alliance NW
Home colours	Away colours	Third colours

Walsall Football Club in England are represented at Reserve and Youth team level by the Walsall Development Squad and Walsall Academy. The Development Squad currently compete in the Central League North-West Division and the academy team compete in the Youth Alliance North-West Division.

Both teams play the majority of their home games at the Birmingham County FA Headquarters at Ray Hall Lane in Perry Barr, although some games are played at the senior side's Bescot Stadium home.

The Development Squad is currently managed by Miguel Llera and the academy side by Kyle Kirby. The make up of both sides is usually very similar, with Walsall's Academy side joining more experienced first team players on the fringes of the EFL League Two matchday squad and those who are returning from injury, in the majority of Development Squad fixtures.

Walsall Development Squad also compete in the Birmingham Senior Cup and Walsall Senior Cup, winning each competition on a number of occasions.

== Players ==
=== Current squad ===
As of 1 July 2021.

== Notable academy graduates ==
Walsall's Youth Academy has produced a number of first team players throughout the club's history. In recent years, notable graduates to go on to play in higher divisions include Matty Fryatt, Julian Bennett, Scott Dann, Jamie Paterson, Will Grigg and Troy Deeney.

Two graduates have gone on to play full international football for England: Allan Clarke and Michael Ricketts. Clarke had a hugely successful career, scoring a winning goal in an FA Cup final while at Leeds United.
