= Hull City A.F.C. Academy =

Youth teams of Hull City A.F.C.

- Full name: Hull City Association Football Club Academy
- Nickname: The Young Tigers
- Ground: Various
- Manager: Conor Sellars (U21s); Vacant (U18s)
- League: Professional Development League
- 2024–25: PDL North, 4th of 11 (U21s); PDL2 North, 8th of 11 (U18s)
- Website: https://www.wearehullcity.co.uk/club/academy/
| Home colours | Away colours | Third colours |

Hull City A.F.C. Academy refers to the youth setup of Hull City Association Football Club. This includes the club's Under-21 and Under-18 sides. The academy achieved Category Two status in 2015.

As of the 2024–25 season, the Under-21s compete in the U21 Professional Development League North Division. They also compete in the U21 Premier League Cup and the East Riding Senior Cup. Meanwhile, the Under-18s compete in the U18 Professional Development League North Division. They also compete in the FA Youth Cup and the Under-18 Professional Development League Cup.

== Grounds ==
The Young Tigers play their home fixtures at various grounds, but most often at the LNER Community Stadium in York. Other grounds include the home of the first team, the MKM Stadium, Dransfield Stadium in North Ferriby, and Bishop Burton College.

== Players ==
=== Under-21 squad ===
As of 29 July 2025

Note: Flags indicate national team as defined under FIFA eligibility rules; some limited exceptions apply. Players may hold more than one non-FIFA nationality.

| No. | Pos. | Nation | Player |
|---|---|---|---|
| 41 | FW | ENG | Tyrell Sellars-Fleming |
| 43 | DF | IRL | Stan Ashbee |
| 47 | MF | ENG | Nathan Tinsdale (captain) |
| 52 | DF | ENG | Noah Wadsworth |
| – | FW | ENG | Pharrell Brown |
| – | DF | ENG | Ed Devine |
| – | FW | KEN | Sammy Henia-Kamau |

| No. | Pos. | Nation | Player |
|---|---|---|---|
| – | FW | ENG | Stan Hewitt |
| – | GK | ENG | Archie Howard |
| – | DF | IRL | Cathal McCarthy |
| – | FW | IRL | Hugh Parker |
| – | DF | ENG | Harry Revill |
| – | MF | ALB | Aidon Shehu |
| – | GK | ENG | Callum Yam |

=== Out on loan ===
As of 8 July 2025

Note: Flags indicate national team as defined under FIFA eligibility rules; some limited exceptions apply. Players may hold more than one non-FIFA nationality.

| No. | Pos. | Nation | Player |
|---|---|---|---|
| 42 | MF | ENG | Rocco Coyle (at Boston United until 1 January 2026) |

=== Under-18 squad ===
As of 22 July 2025

Note: Flags indicate national team as defined under FIFA eligibility rules; some limited exceptions apply. Players may hold more than one non-FIFA nationality.

| No. | Pos. | Nation | Player |
|---|---|---|---|
| – | FW | ENG | Ramell Carter 2nd Year) |
| – | DF | SLE | Cayden Cole (2nd Year) |
| – | FW | ENG | Ted Gode (1st Year) |
| – | DF | ENG | Sasha Gomeniuk (1st Year) |
| – | DF | POL | Oskar Gruszkowski (2nd Year) |
| – | GK | ENG | Jack Hopper (2nd Year) |
| – | FW | WAL | Zac Jagielka (2nd Year) |
| – | DF | ENG | Charlie Leach (2nd Year) |
| – | DF | ENG | Rory Leech (2nd Year) |
| – | MF | ENG | Alfie Maskell (2nd Year) |

| No. | Pos. | Nation | Player |
|---|---|---|---|
| – | FW | ENG | Albert Matique (1st Year) |
| – | DF | ENG | Bobby Moore (1st Year) |
| – | MF | ENG | Josh Ocaya (2nd Year) |
| – | DF | NGR | Calvin Okike (2nd Year) |
| – | ?? | ENG | Dellan Robinson (1st Year) |
| – | ?? | ENG | Emmanuel Sarpong (1st Year) |
| – | MF | ENG | Reuben Silk (2nd Year) |
| – | FW | TAN | Jack Topley (2nd Year) |
| – | FW | ENG | Ekemini Umoren (1st Year) |

== Management ==
As of 20 June 2025

| Position | Name | Ref. |
|---|---|---|
| Academy Manager | (England) Richard Naylor | |
| Head of Emerging Talent | (Wales) Emyr Humphreys | |
| Head of Academy Coaching | (England) Alex Ackerley | |
| Head of Academy Goalkeeping | (England) Chris Butt | |
| Head of Academy Physical Performance | (England) Kieran Smith | |
| U21s Head Coach | (England) Conor Sellars | |
| U21s Assistant Head Coach | Vacant | |
| U18s Head Coach | Vacant | |
| U18s Assistant Head Coach | (England) Mark Beard | |
| Academy Physiotherapist | (England) Duncan Robson | – |

== Notable former players ==
| Name | Nation | Years |
|---|---|---|
| Paul Anderson | (England) ENG | 2005–2006 |
| Will Atkinson | (England) ENG | 1997–2006 |
| Dan Batty | (England) ENG | 2012–2016 |
| James Berry | (England) ENG | 2019–2020 |
| Adam Bolder | (England) ENG | 1996–1998 |
| Jarrod Bowen | (England) ENG | 2014–2017 |
| Sonny Bradley | (England) ENG | 2008–2013 |
| Tom Cairney | (Scotland) SCO | 2007–2009 |
| Max Clark | (England) ENG | 2006–2014 |
| Liam Cooper | (Scotland) SCO | 2002–2008 |
| Mark Cullen | (England) ENG | 2008–2010 |
| Jamie Devitt | (Republic of Ireland) IRL | 2006–2008 |
| Clayton Donaldson | (Jamaica) JAM | 2000–2002 |
| Danny East | (England) ENG | 2003–2011 |

| Name | Nation | Years |
|---|---|---|
| Nicky Featherstone | (England) ENG | 1997–2006 |
| Brandon Fleming | (England) ENG | 2008–2017 |
| Jacob Greaves | (England) ENG | 2008–2019 |
| Matty Jacob | (England) ENG | 2009–2024 |
| Dan James | (Wales) WAL | 2006–2014 |
| Keane Lewis-Potter | (England) ENG | 2015–2019 |
| Robbie McKenzie | (England) ENG | 2007–2017 |
| Harry Ngata | (New Zealand) NZL | 1987–1989 |
| Andy Payton | (England) ENG | 1983–1985 |
| Andy Smith | (England) ENG | 2011–2021 |
| Conor Townsend | (England) ENG | 2001–2011 |
| Josh Tymon | (England) ENG | 2011–2016 |
| Dean Windass | (England) ENG | 1984–1988 |
| Scott Wiseman | (Gibraltar) GIB | 2001–2003 |

== See also ==
- Hull City A.F.C.
