= 2019–20 Professional U18 Development League =

Football season details

U18 Premier League
- Season: 2019–20
- Champions: North Division; Manchester City U18s; South Division; Fulham U18s
- Matches: 195
- Goals: 829 (4.25 per match)
- Top goalscorer: (England) Jay Stansfield Fulham U18s (22 Goals)
- Biggest home win: Everton U18s 10–0 Sunderland U18s (14 September 2019)
- Biggest away win: Swansea City U18s 0–8 Chelsea U18s (7 December 2019)
- Highest scoring: Everton U18s 7–3 West Bromwich Albion U18s (24 August 2019); Everton U18s 10–0 Sunderland U18s (14 September 2019); Swansea City U18s 2–8 West Ham United U18s (2 November 2019)
- Longest winning run: 7 Matches Fulham U18s
- Longest unbeaten run: 12 Matches Chelsea U18s
- Longest winless run: 16 Matches Sunderland U18s
- Longest losing run: 16 Matches Sunderland U18s

The 2019–20 U18 Premier League was the eighth season of the Professional Development League system for men's football. The U18 Premier League is the top-tier league and open only to Category One academies. A total of 24 teams are split regionally into north and south leagues. Teams face their regional opponents both home and away before the top two face each other to determine the national champion. The season ended prematurely due to the COVID-19 Pandemic. Derby County U18s are the defending Champions.

== Tables ==
Final league positions determined by Points Per Game methodology due to season curtailment.

=== North ===
Pos	Team	Pld	W	D	L	GF	GA	GD	Pts	
1	Manchester City U18s (C)	17	14	1	2	56	16	+40	43	North Champions
2	Liverpool U18s	15	10	1	4	48	28	+20	31	
3	Everton U18s	16	10	1	5	48	33	+15	31	
4	Stoke City U18s	15	9	1	5	33	22	+11	28	
5	Derby County U18s	17	9	1	7	38	25	+13	28	
6	Manchester United U18s	16	7	2	7	34	32	+2	23	
7	Middlesbrough U18s	16	6	3	7	28	38	−10	21	
8	Wolverhampton Wanderers U18s	15	6	3	6	22	23	−1	21	
9	West Bromwich Albion U18s	16	6	2	8	34	42	−8	20	
10	Newcastle United U18s	16	4	3	9	23	38	−15	15	
11	Blackburn Rovers U18s	15	4	2	9	24	35	−11	14	
12	Sunderland U18s	16	0	0	16	11	67	−56	0	

Updated to match(es) played on March 10, 2020. Source: Premier League Under 18 Table
(C) Champions

=== South ===
Pos	Team	Pld	W	D	L	GF	GA	GD	Pts	
1	Fulham U18s (C)	17	12	4	1	53	24	+29	40	South Champions
2	Chelsea U18s	16	11	3	2	44	21	+23	36	
3	West Ham United U18s	17	11	4	2	51	28	+23	37	
4	Tottenham Hotspur U18s	17	8	2	7	43	33	+10	26	
5	Leicester City U18s	18	8	3	7	44	35	+9	27	
6	Brighton & Hove Albion U18s	17	7	3	7	30	33	−3	24	
7	Aston Villa U18s	17	6	4	7	33	37	−4	22	
8	Arsenal U18s	16	4	5	7	28	34	−6	17	
9	Southampton U18s	18	6	1	11	27	40	−13	19	
10	Reading U18s	16	4	3	9	25	34	−9	15	
11	Norwich City U18s	16	1	8	7	32	48	−16	11	
12	Swansea City U18s	15	1	2	12	20	63	−43	5	

Updated to match(es) played on March 7, 2020. Source: Premier League Under 18 Table
(C) Champions

== Season statistics ==
=== Top goalscorers ===
As of 11 March 2020

Rank	Player	Club	Goals
1	(England) Jay Stansfield	Fulham	22
2	(Republic of Ireland) Tom Cannon	Everton	16
3	(England) Cole Palmer	Manchester City	15
4	(Scotland) Jack Stretton	Derby County	15
5	(England) Veron Parkes	West Ham United	11
5	(England) Lewis Dobbin	Everton U18s	11
5	(England) Layton Stewart	Liverpool	11
6	(England) James McAtee	Manchester City	10
6	(Albania) Armando Broja	Chelsea	10
6	(Slovakia) Sebastian Nebyla	West Ham United	10
7	(England) Joseph Gibson	Middlesbrough	9
7	(England) Jovan Malcolm	West Bromwich Albion	9
7	(England) Stefan Vukoje	Brighton & Hove Albion	9
7	(Scotland) Thomas Dickson-Peters	Norwich City	9
7	(Belgium) Andre Godfrinne	Stoke City	9
8	(England) Kion Etete	Tottenham Hotspur	8
8	(Wales) Thomas Hill	Liverpool	8
8	(Switzerland) Lorent Tolaj	Brighton & Hove Albion	8
8	(England) Jack Turner	Southampton	8
8	(Republic of Ireland) Kasey McAteer	Leicester City	8
8	(England) Dylan Stephenson	Newcastle United	8
8	(Zambia) Chanka Zimba	Blackburn Rovers	8
9	(England) Liam Delap	Manchester City	7
9	(England) Terell Pennant	Leicester City	7
9	(Sweden) Anthony Elanga	Manchester United	7
9	(France) Jean-Pierre Tiehi	Fulham	7
9	(England) Archie Brown	Derby County	7
9	(Republic of Ireland) Ademipo Odubeko	West Ham United	7
9	(England) Finley Thorndike	West Bromwich Albion	7
9	(Wales) Joshua Thomas	Swansea City	7

=== Hat-tricks ===
As of 11 March 2020

Player	For	Against	Result	Date	Ref.
(England) James McAtee	Manchester City U18s	Newcastle United U18s	7–1 (H)	17 August 2019	
(England) Jaden Philogene-Bidace	Aston Villa U18s	Swansea City U18s	3–3 (H)	24 August 2019	
(Republic of Ireland) Tom Cannon^{4}	Everton U18s	Sunderland U18s	10–0 (H)	14 September 2019	
(Switzerland) Lorent Tolaj^{4}	Brighton & Hove Albion U18s	Arsenal U18s	3–6 (A)	21 September 2019	
(England) Jay Stansfield^{4}	Fulham U18s	West Ham United U18s	5–1 (H)	5 October 2019	
(England) Sam Bellis	Southampton U18s	Norwich City U18s	0–5 (A)	5 October 2019	
(England) Jay Stansfield	Fulham U18s	Swansea City U18s	1–5 (A)	19 October 2019	
(England) Veron Parkes	West Ham United U18s	Swansea City U18s	2–8 (A)	2 November 2019	
(England) Jay Stansfield^{4}	Fulham U18s	Norwich City U18s	5–3 (H)	2 November 2019	
(England) Jovan Malcolm^{4}	West Bromwich Albion U18s	Liverpool U18s	6–3 (H)	9 November 2019	
(England) Rico Richards	West Bromwich Albion U18s	Manchester United U18s	5–3 (H)	30 November 2019	
(England) Cole Palmer	Manchester City U18s	Sunderland U18s	0–7 (A)	7 December 2019	
(Australia) Alex Robertson	Manchester City U18s	Sunderland U18s	0–7 (A)	7 December 2019	
(Republic of Ireland) Mipo Odubeko	West Ham United U18s	Southampton U18s	0–5 (A)	7 December 2019	
(England) Joe Haigh	Chelsea U18s	Swansea City U18s	0–8 (A)	7 December 2019	
(England) Jack Turner	Southampton U18s	Swansea City U18s	5–0 (H)	23 January 2020	
(England) Layton Stewart	Liverpool U18s	Sunderland U18s	4–0 (H)	25 January 2020	
(Wales) Tom Sparrow	Stoke City U18s	Sunderland U18s	5–0 (H)	1 February 2020	
(England) Lewis Dobbin	Everton U18s	Sunderland U18s	2–7 (A)	22 February 2020	
(Republic of Ireland) Tom Cannon	Everton U18s	Sunderland U18s	2–7 (A)	22 February 2020	

Note

(H) – Home; (A) – Away
^{4} – player scored 4 goals

== Professional Development League 2 ==
U18 Professional Development League 2
- Season: 2019–20
- Champions: Wigan Athletic U18s (North Division); Millwall U18s (South Division)
- Matches: 223
- Goals: 847 (3.8 per match)
- Top goalscorer: (Scotland) Kyle Joseph Wigan Athletic U18s, (England) Sean O'Brien Millwall U18s (15 Goals Each)
- Biggest home win: Charlton Athletic U18s 7–1 Hull City U18s (17 August 2019); Bristol City U18s 6–0 Queens Park Rangers U18s (5 October 2019); Bristol City U18s 6–0 Colchester United U18s (7 December 2019)
- Biggest away win: Coventry City U18s 0–7 Crystal Palace U18s (28 September 2019)
- Highest scoring: Wigan Athletic U18s 6–5 Colchester United U18s (7 September 2019)
- Longest winning run: 11 Matches Wigan Athletic U18s
- Longest unbeaten run: 15 Matches Wigan Athletic U18s
- Longest winless run: 10 Matches Queens Park Rangers U18s
- Longest losing run: 8 Matches Queens Park Rangers U18s

The 2019–20 U18 Professional Development League 2 season was the eighth campaign of post-EPPP under-18 football's second tier, designed for those academies with Category Two status. A total of 21 teams were split regionally into north and south divisions, with each team facing opponents in their own region twice both home and away, and opponents in the other region once. The teams that finished in the top two places in both regions at the end of the season were supposed to advance to the knockout stage to determine the overall league champion, but the season was halted in March 2020 due to the COVID-19 pandemic in England. Sheffield Wednesday U18s were the defending champions. No overall champions were awarded this season.

Wigan Athletic U18s acquired Category Two status in July 2019 and joined the North Division this season.

=== Tables ===
Final league positions determined by Points Per Game methodology due to season curtailment.

==== North Division ====
Pos	Team	Pld	W	D	L	GF	GA	GD	Pts	Qualification
1	Wigan Athletic U18s (C)	24	18	3	3	65	29	+36	57	North Champions
2	Sheffield United U18s	20	13	3	4	50	27	+23	42	
3	Barnsley U18s	22	11	3	8	34	30	+4	36	
4	Burnley U18s	23	10	4	9	36	39	−3	34	
5	Nottingham Forest U18s	23	8	5	10	30	36	−6	29	
6	Sheffield Wednesday U18s	21	6	5	10	27	28	−1	23	
7	Crewe Alexandra U18s	23	6	7	10	38	45	−7	25	
8	Hull City U18s	24	7	4	13	38	51	−13	25	
9	Birmingham City U18s	21	6	3	12	30	46	−16	21	
10	Bolton Wanderers U18s	22	6	4	12	37	62	−25	22	
11	Leeds United U18s	22	5	6	11	36	44	−8	21	

(C) Champions

==== South Division ====
Pos	Team	Pld	W	D	L	GF	GA	GD	Pts	Qualification
1	Millwall U18s (C)	19	14	1	4	61	23	+38	43	South Champions
2	Charlton Athletic U18s	20	11	6	3	42	21	+21	39	
3	Watford U18s	20	11	4	5	47	37	+10	37	
4	Bristol City U18s	22	12	4	6	53	41	+12	40	
5	Crystal Palace U18s	19	10	4	5	45	25	+20	34	
6	Ipswich Town U18s	20	8	4	8	42	39	+3	28	
7	Cardiff City U18s	21	5	7	9	43	45	−2	22	
8	Colchester United U18s	18	4	4	10	33	55	−22	16	
9	Coventry City U18s	21	5	2	14	29	64	−35	17	
10	Queens Park Rangers U18s	21	4	3	14	31	60	−29	15	

(C) Champions

=== Top goalscorers ===
As of 10 March 2020

Rank	Player	Club	Goals
1	(Scotland) Kyle Joseph	Wigan Athletic U18s	15
1	(England) Sean O'Brien	Millwall U18s	15
3	(England) Dominic Hutchinson	Watford U18s	14
3	(England) Hamzad Kargbo	Queens Park Rangers U18s	14
5	(England) Sean McGurk	Wigan Athletic U18s	14
6	(England) Abdul Abdulmalik	Millwall U18s	11
6	(England) Luca Albon	Charlton Athletic U18s	11
8	(England) Tyrese Briscoe	Millwall U18s	12
8	(England) Jake Hutchinson	Colchester United U18s	12
10	(Wales) Kieron Evans	Cardiff City U18s	9
11	(England) Sam Ackroyd	Sheffield United U18s	8
11	(Northern Ireland) Chris Conn-Clarke	Burnley U18s	8
11	(England) Tom Costello	Wigan Athletic U18s	8
11	(Zambia) Ntazana Mayembe	Cardiff City U18s	8

=== Hat-tricks ===
As of 11 March 2020

Player	For	Against	Result	Date	Ref.
(England) Rob Street	Crystal Palace U18s	Colchester United U18s	0–4 (A)	10 August 2019	
(England) Luca Albon	Charlton Athletic U18s	Hull City U18s	7–1 (H)	17 August 2019	
(England) Joe Robbins	Crewe Alexandra U18s	Ipswich Town U18s	4–4 (A)	31 August 2019	
(England) Adan George	Birmingham City U18s	Crystal Palace U18s	5–1 (H)	5 September 2019	
(England) Jake Hutchinson^{4}	Colchester United U18s	Wigan Athletic U18s	5–6 (A)	7 September 2019	
(Wales) Lewis Reed	Ipswich Town U18s	Colchester United U18s	6–1 (H)	12 October 2019	
(Northern Ireland) Chris Conn-Clarke	Burnley U18s	Birmingham City U18s	1–4 (A)	19 October 2019	
(Scotland) Kyle Joseph	Wigan Athletic U18s	Bolton Wanderers U18s	1–5 (A)	9 November 2019	
(England) Demarlio Brown-Sterling	Bolton Wanderers U18s	Nottingham Forest U18s	2–4 (A)	11 January 2020	
(Malawi) Henri Kumwenda	Leeds United U18s	Crewe Alexandra U18s	3–4 (A)	22 February 2020	

Note

(H) – Home; (A) – Away
^{4} – player scored 4 goals

== League 3 ==
EFL Youth Alliance
- Season: 2019-20
- Champions: North-East Division; Doncaster Rovers U18s; North-West Division South-East Division; Peterborough United U18s; South-West Division; AFC Bournemouth U18s; Merit League One; None; Merit League Two; None
- Matches: 450
- Goals: 1,847 (4.1 per match)
- Top goalscorer: (England) Alfie Stanley Portsmouth U18s (21 Goals)

League 3 is run by the Football League under the auspices of the Football League Youth Alliance. 47 teams participated, but only 46 competed this season, 2 fewer than the previous season. Bury U18s were expelled from the league and had their academy closed after their parent club Bury were expelled from the EFL, while Hartlepool United U18s and Wrexham U18s did not participate this season because they lost the EPPP License. Wigan Athletic U18s acquired Category Two status in July 2019 and joined the U18 Professional Development League 2 leaving the league. Salford City U18s joined the league this season after the first team got promoted.

=== League stage ===
As of match played 10 March 2020

==== North-East Division ====
Pos	Team	Pld	W	D	L	GF	GA	GD	Pts	PPG
1	Doncaster Rovers U18s (C)	18	12	2	4	42	21	+21	38	2.11
2	Rotherham United U18s	16	7	6	3	39	28	+11	27	1.69
3	Bradford City U18s	17	8	1	8	33	29	+4	25	1.47
4	Scunthorpe United U18s	15	8	1	6	26	26	0	25	1.67
5	Huddersfield Town U18s	18	8	1	9	30	42	−12	25	1.39
6	Mansfield Town U18s	15	7	2	6	24	25	−1	23	1.53
7	Notts County U18s	17	7	1	9	31	28	+3	22	1.29
8	Grimsby Town U18s	16	6	3	7	25	30	−5	21	1.31
9	Chesterfield U18s	18	6	3	9	28	45	−17	21	1.17
10	Burton Albion U18s	15	6	1	8	23	25	−2	19	1.27
11	Lincoln City U18s	19	5	3	11	30	32	−2	18	0.95

Source: soccerway.com
(C) Champions

==== North-West Division ====
Pos	Team	Pld	W	D	L	GF	GA	GD	Pts	PPG
1	Salford City U18s	17	14	0	3	65	21	+44	42	2.47
2	Preston North End U18s	17	12	1	4	50	22	+28	37	2.18
3	Fleetwood Town U18s	15	12	1	2	35	8	+27	37	2.47
4	Carlisle United U18s	19	9	3	7	36	34	+2	30	1.58
5	Accrington Stanley U18s	19	10	0	9	32	39	−7	30	1.58
6	Blackpool U18s	18	9	2	7	36	37	−1	29	1.61
7	Walsall U18s	16	8	2	6	37	26	+11	26	1.63
8	Oldham Athletic U18s	18	7	4	7	31	36	−5	25	1.39
9	Tranmere Rovers U18s	18	6	2	10	42	40	+2	20	1.11
10	Rochdale U18s	15	4	1	10	27	38	−11	13	0.87
11	Shrewsbury Town U18s	16	4	1	11	18	29	−11	13	0.81
12	Morecambe U18s	17	3	4	10	18	50	−32	13	0.76
13	Port Vale U18s	15	1	1	13	14	61	−47	4	0.27
14	Bury U18s	0	0	0	0	0	0	0	0	—

Source: soccerway.com

==== South-East Division ====
Pos	Team	Pld	W	D	L	GF	GA	GD	Pts	Qualification
1	Peterborough United U18s (C)	20	15	3	2	55	24	+31	48	Merit League One
2	Northampton Town U18s	20	14	2	4	74	34	+40	44	Merit League One
3	AFC Wimbledon U18s	20	11	4	5	58	22	+36	37	Merit League One
4	Cambridge United U18s	20	11	2	7	40	33	+7	35	Merit League One
5	Southend United U18s	20	9	3	8	46	43	+3	30	Merit League One
6	Stevenage U18s	20	9	1	10	45	45	0	28	Merit League One
7	Luton Town U18s	20	7	5	8	51	47	+4	26	Merit League Two
8	Gillingham U18s	20	6	4	10	38	48	−10	22	Merit League Two
9	Leyton Orient U18s	20	7	1	12	37	65	−28	22	Merit League Two
10	Barnet U18s	20	6	2	12	36	58	−22	20	Merit League Two
11	Milton Keynes Dons U18s	20	1	1	18	22	83	−61	4	Merit League Two

Source: soccerway.com
(C) Champions

==== South-West Division ====
Pos	Team	Pld	W	D	L	GF	GA	GD	Pts	PPG	Qualification
1	AFC Bournemouth U18s (C)	20	14	4	2	71	22	+49	46	2.30	Merit League One
2	Oxford United U18s	20	13	3	4	58	26	+32	42	2.10	Merit League One
3	Portsmouth U18s	20	13	2	5	59	42	+17	41	2.05	Merit League One
4	Exeter City U18s	20	12	0	8	52	36	+16	36	1.80	Merit League One
5	Swindon Town U18s	20	10	3	7	49	35	+14	33	1.65	Merit League One
6	Yeovil Town U18s	20	10	2	8	43	45	−2	32	1.60	Merit League One
7	Forest Green Rovers U18s	20	6	3	11	33	48	−15	21	1.05	Merit League Two
8	Bristol Rovers U18s	20	6	3	11	32	49	−17	21	1.05	Merit League Two
9	Cheltenham Town U18s	20	5	2	13	30	55	−25	17	0.85	Merit League Two
10	Plymouth Argyle U18s	20	4	3	13	33	61	−28	15	0.75	Merit League Two
11	Newport County U18s	20	4	1	15	23	64	−41	13	0.65	Merit League Two

Source: soccerway.com
(C) Champions

=== Merit League Stage ===
The teams in the Southeast and Southwest Divisions played another ten games to determine the champions of Merit League One and Merit League Two. No champions were made as the Merit League Stage was just beginning.

==== Merit League One ====
Pos	Team	Pld	W	D	L	GF	GA	GD	Pts
1	AFC Wimbledon U18s	4	3	0	1	6	3	+3	9
2	AFC Bournemouth U18s	3	2	1	0	5	2	+3	7
3	Cambridge United U18s	3	2	1	0	7	5	+2	7
4	Peterborough United U18s	3	2	0	1	4	1	+3	6
5	Oxford United U18s	3	2	0	1	3	2	+1	6
6	Swindon Town U18s	3	1	1	1	8	7	+1	4
7	Yeovil Town U18s	2	1	0	1	4	3	+1	3
8	Southend United U18s	3	1	0	2	4	4	0	3
9	Northampton Town U18s	3	1	0	2	4	6	−2	3
10	Stevenage U18s	4	1	0	3	4	8	−4	3
11	Portsmouth U18s	3	0	1	2	0	3	−3	1
12	Exeter City U18s	2	0	0	2	3	8	−5	0

Source: soccerway.com

==== Merit League Two ====
Pos	Team	Pld	W	D	L	GF	GA	GD	Pts
1	Bristol Rovers U18s	2	2	0	0	7	0	+7	6
2	Forest Green Rovers U18s	2	2	0	0	7	2	+5	6
3	Luton Town U18s	2	2	0	0	8	6	+2	6
4	Gillingham U18s	1	1	0	0	2	0	+2	3
5	Leyton Orient U18s	1	1	0	0	2	1	+1	3
6	Milton Keynes Dons U18s	3	1	0	2	5	5	0	3
7	Plymouth Argyle U18s	2	0	0	2	3	5	−2	0
8	Newport County U18s	1	0	0	1	0	2	−2	0
9	Barnet U18s	2	0	0	2	3	7	−4	0
10	Cheltenham Town U18s	2	0	0	2	1	10	−9	0

Source: soccerway.com

== See also ==
- 2019–20 in English football
