= 2020–21 Professional U23 Development League =

The 2020–21 Professional U23 Development League was the ninth season of the Professional Development League system.

Burnley U23s, Crystal Palace U23s and Leeds United U23s joined the Premier League 2 for the 2020–21 season after gaining category one status academies. Prior to the start of the season Swansea City left the league after downgrading their academy to category two.

== Premier League 2 ==
Premier League 2
- Season: 2020–21
- Champions: Division 1 Manchester City U23s (1st Title); Division 2 Leeds United U23s (1st Title)
- Promoted: Leeds United U23s; Crystal Palace U23s
- Relegated: Southampton U23s
- Matches: 341 (338 RS, 3 PO)
- Goals: 1,134 (3.33 per match) (1,127 RS, 7 PO)
- Best player: (England) Liam Delap Manchester City U23s
- Top goalscorer: Overall (England) Liam Delap Manchester City U23s (24 Goals); Division 1 (England) Liam Delap Manchester City U23s (24 Goals); Division 2 (England) Josh Hawkes Sunderland U23s (14 Goals)
- Biggest home win: Crystal Palace U23s 6–0 Reading U23s (9 November 2020); Leeds United U23s 7–1 Fulham U23s (21 December 2020); Manchester City U23s 7–1 Southampton U23s (15 March 2021); Leicester City U23s 7–1 Southampton U23s (19 April 2021)
- Biggest away win: Sunderland U23s 0–6 Middlesbrough U23s (19 October 2020); Blackburn Rovers U23s 0–6 Manchester United U23s (6 November 2020)
- Highest scoring: Manchester United U23s 6–4 Blackburn Rovers U23s (5 February 2021)
- Longest winning run: 9 Matches Leeds United U23s
- Longest unbeaten run: 18 Matches Manchester City U23s
- Longest winless run: 10 Matches Southampton U23s
- Longest losing run: 8 Matches Southampton U23s
- Highest attendance: 3,000 Crystal Palace U23s 0–0 Sunderland U23s (24 May 2021) Play Off Final
- Lowest attendance: 0 Most matches were behind closed doors due to covid

=== Division 1 ===
==== Table ====
As of match played 10 May 2021

Pos	Club	P	W	D	L	F	A	GD	Pts
1	Manchester City U23s (C)	24	17	5	2	79	30	+49	56
2	Chelsea U23s	24	12	6	6	50	36	+14	42
3	Tottenham Hotspur U23s	24	11	5	8	45	44	+1	38
4	Blackburn Rovers U23s	24	10	7	7	48	41	+7	37
5	Everton U23s	24	10	6	8	44	28	+16	36
6	Derby County U23s	24	11	3	10	43	49	–6	36
7	Liverpool U23s	24	10	5	9	48	50	–2	35
8	Manchester United U23s	24	10	4	10	58	59	–1	34
9	Brighton & Hove Albion U23s	24	7	9	8	36	42	–6	30
10	Arsenal U23s	24	6	8	10	37	43	–6	26
11	West Ham United U23s	24	6	6	12	32	48	–16	24
12	Leicester City U23s	24	6	4	14	41	55	–14	22
13	Southampton U23s (R)	24	4	4	16	29	65	–36	16

==== Results ====
Home \ Away	ARS	BLA	B&H	CHE	DER	EVE	LEI	LIV	MNC	MNU	SOU	TOT	WHU
Arsenal U23s		0–3	5–0	2–2	3–1	1–0	2–1	0–1	0–2	3–3	1–2	0–1	1–2
Blackburn Rovers U23s	0–6		1–1	2–4	0–2	1–1	4–0	2–2	2–1	2–2	5–1	2–3	4–1
Brighton & Hove Albion U23s	2–2	1–2		2–0	3–1	2–2	0–4	1–0	1–3	2–5	3–0	1–5	6–1
Chelsea U23s	3–0	1–0	0–0		3–2	2–1	2–1	2–3	2–2	6–1	3–1	3–2	1–0
Derby County U23s	2–3	3–5	1–1	2–1		1–3	2–1	2–1	0–4	2–6	3–1	1–0	3–2
Everton U23s	1–1	2–1	1–1	2–0	4–1		3–0	1–1	1–2	3–1	4–0	0–0	2–1
Leicester City U23s	1–1	1–3	1–1	1–1	1–2	2–4		0–2	1–6	4–2	7–1	1–3	2–1
Liverpool U23s	4–0	1–2	3–2	3–1	1–4	1–0	2–2		2–7	3–6	0–0	3–4	1–1
Manchester City U23s	4–1	1–1	2–1	2–2	3–3	3–1	4–0	3–2		3–0	7–1	4–1	5–0
Manchester United U23s	3–0	6–4	0–0	4–2	1–3	2–1	0–2	3–5	2–2		3–1	4–2	2–3
Southampton U23s	2–2	0–1	0–1	1–4	1–0	0–5	5–2	1–2	5–2	1–2		1–1	2–2
Tottenham Hotspur U23s	1–1	1–1	1–1	1–4	1–2	2–1	1–5	4–1	1–6	3–0	2–1		3–0
West Ham United U23s	2–2	0–0	2–3	1–1	0–0	2–1	3–1	2–4	0–1	2–0	3–1	1–2	

Updated to match(es) played on 3 May 2021. Source: Premier League 2 Division 1 results
Legend: Blue = home team win; Yellow = draw; Red = away team win.

=== Division 2 ===
==== Table ====
As of match played 10 May 2021

Pos	Club	P	W	D	L	F	A	GD	Pts
1	Leeds United U23s (P)	24	18	2	4	62	29	+33	56
2	Stoke City U23s	24	14	3	7	41	30	+11	45
3	Crystal Palace U23s (P)	24	11	3	10	45	41	+4	36
4	Wolverhampton Wanderers U23s	24	10	6	8	40	36	+4	36
5	Sunderland U23s	24	10	5	9	42	41	+1	35
6	Middlesbrough U23s	24	10	4	10	44	35	+9	34
7	Burnley U23s	24	10	4	10	38	41	–3	34
8	Reading U23s	24	10	2	12	41	54	–13	32
9	Aston Villa U23s	24	9	4	11	46	48	-2	31
10	Fulham U23s	24	9	3	12	38	46	–8	30
11	Norwich City U23s	24	7	4	13	32	40	–8	25
12	West Bromwich Albion U23s	24	7	4	13	37	49	–12	25
13	Newcastle United U23s	24	7	4	13	31	47	–16	25

==== Results ====
Home \ Away	AST	BUR	CRY	FUL	LEE	MID	NEW	NOR	REA	STK	SUN	WBA	WOL
Aston Villa U23s		2–3	4–4	2–3	1–2	1–1	1–1	3–0	1–2	3–4	0–2	2–1	4–0
Burnley U23s	2–2		0–1	2–1	1–4	3–2	1–3	2–2	3–1	1–2	3–2	3–1	0–0
Crystal Palace U23s	0–1	1–0		2–3	2–0	3–2	3–0	4–0	6–0	2–2	1–2	3–3	2–1
Fulham U23s	4–1	1–4	5–2		1–1	3–1	2–2	0–2	0–3	1–2	2–0	1–0	0–2
Leeds United U23s	3–2	5–2	4–1	7–1		1–0	2–1	2–0	3–0	1–0	2–0	2–1	2–2
Middlesbrough U23s	4–1	3–0	0–1	1–0	2–4		2–1	0–3	2–3	2–0	1–1	0–1	1–1
Newcastle United U23s	1–2	0–2	2–0	2–1	4–3	2–2		0–2	1–2	3–2	0–4	3–2	0–3
Norwich City U23s	2–3	0–0	3–0	0–0	0–2	1–3	0–1		3–0	2–1	2–3	2–2	1–2
Reading U23s	3–1	0–2	2–1	0–4	3–2	2–4	3–2	1–3		1–3	0–2	5–2	5–0
Stoke City U23s	0–2	0–1	1–0	1–0	4–0	2–0	2–1	2–1	4–1		0–0	4–3	3–1
Sunderland U23s	2–3	3–0	3–4	5–3	1–3	0–6	1–1	3–1	2–1	1–1		2–3	2–1
West Bromwich Albion U23s	3–1	2–1	1–2	1–2	0–5	0–1	1–0	3–2	1–1	0–1	3–1		2–4
Wolverhampton Wanderers U23s	1–3	3–2	2–0	3–0	0–2	1–4	4–0	3–0	2–2	3–0	0–0	1–1	

Updated to match(es) played on 16 April 2021. Source:
Legend: Blue = home team win; Yellow = draw; Red = away team win.
For upcoming matches, an "a" indicates there is an article about the rivalry between the two participants.

===== Play-offs =====
Semi-finals
2	Stoke City U23s	0
5	Sunderland U23s	2
3	Crystal Palace U23s	3
4	Wolverhampton Wanderers U23s	2

Final
3	Crystal Palace U23s	0 (5)(p)
5	Sunderland U23s	0 (3)

==== Semifinals ====
17 May 2021
13:00

Crystal Palace U23s	3–2 (a.e.t.)	Wolverhampton Wanderers U23s
Street 7'; Rich-Baghuelou 36'; Omilabu 100'	Report	Corbeanu 47', 75'

Selhurst Park, Selhurst
Attendance: 1,031
Referee: Lewis Smith

17 May 2021
13:00

Stoke City U23s	0–2	Sunderland U23s
	Report	Hawkes 56'; Younger 65'

Bet365 Stadium, Stoke-on-Trent
Attendance: 1,481
Referee: Martin Woods

==== Final ====
24 May 2021

Crystal Palace U23s	0–0	Sunderland U23s
Penalties
Street (penalty scored); Hannam (penalty scored); Boateng (penalty scored); Gordon (penalty scored); Omilabu (penalty scored)	5–3	(penalty scored) Hackett; (penalty scored) Harris; (penalty scored) Neil; (penalty missed) Taylor

Selhurst Park, Selhurst
Attendance: 3,000
Referee: Tom Reeves

== Top goalscorers ==
=== Division 1 ===
As of 3 May 2021

Rank	Player	Club	Goals
1	(England) Liam Delap	Manchester City U23s	24
2	(England) Cole Palmer	Manchester City U23s	13
3	(Scotland) Connor McBride	Blackburn Rovers U23s	12
4	(Wales) Nathan Broadhead	Everton U23s	11
4	(England) Cameron Cresswell	Derby County U23s	11
5	(England) Joe Hugill	Manchester United U23s	10
5	(Germany) Felix Nmecha	Manchester City U23s	10
5	(Republic of Ireland) Mipo Odubeko	West Ham United U23s	10
5	(England) Shola Shoretire	Manchester United U23s	10
5	(England) Jacob Wakeling	Leicester City U23s	10
11	(United States) Folarin Balogun	Arsenal U23s	9
11	(Sweden) Anthony Elanga	Manchester United U23s	9
11	(England) Kion Etete	Tottenham Hotspur U23s	9

=== Division 2 ===
As of 24 May 2021

Rank	Player	Club	Goals
1	(England) Josh Hawkes	Sunderland U23s	14
2	(England) Louie Barry	Aston Villa U23s	13
3	(England) Sam Greenwood	Leeds United U23s	12
4	(England) Joe Gelhardt	Leeds United U23s	11
4	(Portugal) Fabio Carvalho	Fulham U23s	11
6	(Nigeria) Femi Azeez	Reading U23s	10
6	(Wales) Aaron Ramsey	Aston Villa U23s	10
6	(England) Max Thompson	Burnley U23s	10
6	(France) Jean-Pierre Tiehi	Fulham U23s	10
10	(Republic of Ireland) Ethon Varian	Stoke City U23s	9
11	(Bulgaria) Sylvester Jasper	Fulham U23s	8
11	(Sweden) Joel Mumbongo	Burnley U23s	8
11	(Uganda) Jayden Onen	Reading U23s	8

=== Hat-tricks ===
As of 24 May 2021

Player	For	Against	Result	Date	Division	Ref.
(Germany) Gabriel Kyeremateng^{4}	Stoke City U23s	Leeds United U23s	4–0 (H)	14 September 2020	Division 2	
(England) Isaac Fletcher	Middlesbrough U23s	Sunderland U23s	0–6 (A)	19 October 2020	Division 2	
(Austria) Moritz Bauer	Stoke City U23s	Reading U23s	4–1 (H)	26 October 2020	Division 2	
(Scotland) Jack Stretton	Derby County U23s	West Ham United U23s	3–2 (H)	2 November 2020	Division 1	
(England) Dan N'Lundulu	Southampton U23s	Manchester City U23s	5–2 (H)	7 November 2020	Division 1	
(Portugal) Fabio Carvalho	Fulham U23s	Crystal Palace U23s	5–2 (H)	4 December 2020	Division 2	
(Nigeria) Nathan Tella	Southampton U23s	Leicester City U23s	5–2 (H)	12 December 2020	Division 1	
(Republic of Ireland) Ethon Varian	Stoke City U23s	West Bromwich Albion U23s	4–3 (H)	21 December 2020	Division 2	
(Netherlands) Crysencio Summerville	Leeds United U23s	Burnley U23s	1–4 (A)	11 January 2021	Division 2	
(England) Liam Delap	Manchester City U23s	Derby County U23s	0–4 (A)	18 January 2021	Division 1	
(United States) Folarin Balogun	Arsenal U23s	Brighton & Hove Albion U23s	5–0 (H)	22 January 2021	Division 1	
(England) Louie Barry	Aston Villa U23s	Norwich City U23s	2–3 (A)	22 January 2021	Division 2	
(England) Joe Hugill^{4}	Manchester United U23s	Liverpool U23s	3–6 (A)	30 January 2021	Division 1	
(Wales) Sion Spence	Crystal Palace U23s	Norwich City U23s	4–0 (H)	1 February 2021	Division 2	
(England) Shola Shoretire	Manchester United U23s	Blackburn Rovers U23s	6–4 (H)	5 February 2021	Division 1	
(Wales) Nathan Broadhead	Everton U23s	Manchester United U23s	3–1 (H)	22 February 2021	Division 1	
(England) Cole Palmer	Manchester City U23s	West Ham United U23s	5–0 (H)	8 March 2021	Division 1	
(England) Liam Delap	Manchester City U23s	Southampton U23s	7–1 (H)	15 March 2021	Division 1	
(England) Joe Gelhardt	Leeds United U23s	West Bromwich Albion U23s	0–5 (A)	22 March 2021	Division 2	
(Republic of Ireland) Mipo Odubeko	West Ham United U23s	Manchester United U23s	2–3 (A)	9 April 2021	Division 1	
(England) Jacob Wakeling	Leicester City U23s	Southampton U23s	7–1 (H)	19 April 2021	Division 1	
(England) Liam Delap	Manchester City U23s	Tottenham Hotspur U23s	1–6 (A)	7 May 2021	Division 1	
(England) Charlie Whitaker	Everton U23s	Southampton U23s	4–0 (H)	7 May 2021	Division 1	

Note

(H) – Home; (A) – Away
^{4} – player scored 4 goals

=== Awards ===
Player of the season: (England) Liam Delap (Manchester City U23s)

=== Player of the Month ===
Month	Player	Club	Ref.
September	(England) Sam Greenwood	Leeds United U23s	
October	(England) Cole Palmer	Manchester City U23s	
November	(England) Liam Delap	Manchester City U23s	
December	(England) Lewis Bate	Chelsea U23s	
January	(Republic of Ireland) Louie Barry	Aston Villa U23s	
February	(England) Shola Shoretire	Manchester United U23s	
March	(Wales) Aaron Ramsey	Aston Villa U23s	
April	(Republic of Ireland) Ademipo Odubeko	West Ham United U23s	

== Professional Development League ==
U23 Professional Development League
- Season: 2020–21
- Champions: Birmingham City U23s (1st Title)
- Regular Season Champions: Sheffield United U23s (1st Title)
- Matches: 228 (225 RS, 3 PO)
- Goals: 726 (3.18 per match) (717 RS, 9 PO)
- Top goalscorer: (England) Louis Britton Bristol City U23s (16 Goals)
- Biggest home win: Queens Park Rangers U23s 5–0 Ipswich Town U23s (22 September 2020); Millwall U23s 6–1 Colchester United U23s ( 15 December 2020); Sheffield United U23s 5–0 Birmingham City U23s (12 March 2021); Cardiff City U23s 6–1 Wigan Athletic U23s (30 March 2021)
- Biggest away win: Wigan Athletic U23s 1–11 Birmingham City U23s (10 May 2021)
- Highest scoring: Wigan Athletic U23s 1–11 Birmingham City U23s (10 May 2021)
- Longest winning run: 7 Matches Sheffield United U23s
- Longest unbeaten run: 9 Matches Sheffield United U23s
- Longest winless run: 9 Matches Colchester United U23s
- Longest losing run: 8 Matches Colchester United U23s

The 2020-2021 Professional Development League season is the ninth campaign of post-EPPP Under-23 football's second tier, designed for those academies with Category 2 status. A total of 18 teams are split regionally into north and south divisions, with each team facing opponents in their own region twice both home and away and opponents in the other region once for a total of 25 games. The sides finishing in the top two positions in both regions at the end of the season will progress to a knockout stage to determine the overall league champion. Nottingham Forest and Millwall are the defending regional champions.

18 Teams competed in the league this season, a record low with 3 fewer teams than last season. Swansea City U23s dropped down to Category Two status in August 2020 and will join the South division this season after 5 years in the Premier League 2, while Burnley U23s, Crystal Palace U23s, and founding member Leeds United U23s joined the Premier League 2 for the 2020–21 season after gaining Category One status Academies after 3 seasons in the league for Burnley U23s, 7 seasons in the league for Crystal Palace U23s and 8 seasons in the league for founding member Leeds United U23s respectively. Bolton Wanderers U23s also left dropping down to Category Three after 5 seasons in the league.

=== Tables ===
==== North Division ====
Pos	Team	Pld	W	D	L	GF	GA	GD	Pts	Qualification
1	Sheffield United U23s	25	17	4	4	60	22	+38	55	Qualification for Knock-out stage
2	Birmingham City U23s	25	15	2	8	67	42	+25	47	Qualification for Knock-out stage
3	Nottingham Forest U23s	25	12	6	7	46	30	+16	42	
4	Barnsley U23s	25	11	8	6	36	28	+8	41	
5	Hull City U23s	25	12	3	10	36	32	+4	39	
6	Wigan Athletic U23s	25	11	3	11	32	54	−22	36	
7	Coventry City U23s	25	9	7	9	43	31	+12	34	
8	Sheffield Wednesday U23s	25	8	5	12	32	41	−9	29	
9	Crewe Alexandra U23s	25	6	7	12	27	45	−18	25	

==== South Division ====
Pos	Team	Pld	W	D	L	GF	GA	GD	Pts	Qualification
1	Bristol City U23s	25	16	2	7	51	35	+16	50	Qualification for Knock-out stage
2	Ipswich Town U23s	25	12	6	7	44	41	+3	42	Qualification for Knock-out stage
3	Cardiff City U23s	25	10	2	13	43	42	+1	32	
4	Watford U23s	25	9	5	11	37	50	−13	32	
5	Charlton Athletic U23s	25	9	4	12	46	48	−2	31	
6	Millwall U23s	25	8	6	11	31	35	−4	30	
7	Swansea City U23s	25	6	8	11	33	47	−14	26	
8	Queens Park Rangers U23s	25	6	5	14	27	42	−15	23	
9	Colchester United U23s	25	3	7	15	26	52	−26	16	

=== Knock-out stage ===
Semi-finals

14 May 2021
19:00

Bristol City U23s	1–2 (a.e.t.)	Birmingham City U23s
Edwards 26'	Report	George 48' (pen.); Redmond 119'

Ashton Gate, Bristol

17 May 2021
19:00

Sheffield United U23s	4–0	Ipswich Town U23s
Brooks 25'; Osula 32', 36', 41'	Report

Brammall Lane, Sheffield
Attendance: Behind Closed Doors

Professional Development League National Final

24 May 2021
19:00

Sheffield United U23s	0–2	Birmingham City U23s
		George 6', 15'

Brammall Lane, Sheffield

=== Top goalscorers ===
As of 24 May 2021

Rank	Player	Club	Goals
1	(England) Louis Britton	Bristol City U23s	16
2	(England) Josh Andrews	Birmingham City U23s	10
2	(England) Adan George	Birmingham City U23s	10
2	(Senegal) Iliman N'Diaye	Sheffield United U23s	10
2	(England) Will Swan	Nottingham Forest U23s	10
6	(Iraq) Ali Al-Hamadi	Swansea City U23s	9
6	(England) Sam Bell	Bristol City U23s	9
6	(Wales) Isaak Davies	Cardiff City U23s	9
9	(England) Zak Brown	Ipswich Town U23s	8
9	(England) Zak Brunt	Sheffield United U23s	8
9	(Guinea-Bissau) Junior Quitirna	Charlton Athletic U23s	8
9	(England) Ahmed Salam	Hull City U23s	8
13	(England) Danny Brammall	Barnsley U23s	7
13	(England) Charles Clayden	Charlton Athletic U23s	7
13	(Canada) Daniel Jebbison	Sheffield United U23s	7
13	(England) Charlie Jolley	Wigan Athletic U23s	7
13	(England) Sean O'Brien	Millwall U23s	7

=== Hat-tricks ===
As of 24 May 2021

Player	For	Against	Result	Date	Ref.
(England) Jake Taylor	Nottingham Forest U23s	Wigan Athletic U23s	1–5 (A)	28 September 2020	
(England) Louis Britton	Bristol City U23s	Swansea City U23s	3–0 (H)	29 September 2020	
(England) Josh Andrews	Birmingham City U23s	Ipswich Town U23s	4–5 (H)	16 October 2020	
(England) Zak Brown	Ipswich Town U23s	Birmingham City U23s	4–5 (A)	16 October 2020	
(Wales) Josh Thomas	Swansea City U23s	Nottingham Forest U23s	4–2 (H)	8 November 2020	
(Senegal) Iliman N'Diaye	Sheffield United U23s	Crewe Alexandra U23s	4–0 (H)	2 December 2020	
(England) Ahmed Salam	Hull City U23s	Ipswich Town U23s	4–1 (H)	22 March 2021	
(Wales) Rubin Colwill	Cardiff City U23s	Wigan Athletic U23s	6–1 (H)	30 March 2021	
(Portugal) Fabio Tavares	Coventry City U23s	Cardiff City U23s	1–6 (A)	27 April 2021	
(Denmark) William Osula	Sheffield United U23s	Ipswich Town U23s	4–0 (H)	17 May 2021	

Note

(H) – Home; (A) – Away

== See also ==
- 2020–21 in English football
