= 2019–20 Professional U23 Development League =

The 2019–20 Professional U23 Development League was the eighth season of the Professional Development League system.

The competition was suspended due to the COVID-19 pandemic after group stage matches on 12 March 2020, and was originally to restart in June 2020. However, the season was eventually cancelled on 1 May 2020. The league was decided on a points-per-game system in August 2020 with Chelsea winning the Division 1 title and Wolverhampton Wanderers being relegated. In Division 2, West Ham United and Manchester United were promoted with no promotion play-offs being played.

== Premier League 2 ==
Premier League 2
- Season: 2019–20
- Champions: Chelsea U23s (2nd Title); Division 2 West Ham United U23s (2nd Title)
- Promoted: West Ham United U23s; Manchester United U23s
- Relegated: Wolverhampton Wanderers U23s
- Matches: 212
- Goals: 748 (3.53 per match)
- Best Player: (England) Curtis Jones Liverpool U23s
- Top goalscorer: Overall (England) Nathan Holland West Ham United U23s, (Republic of Ireland) Anthony Scully West Ham United U23s (12 Goals Each); Division 1 (United States) Folarin Balogun Arsenal U23s (England) Jahmal Hector-Ingram Derby County U23s (10 Goals Each); Division 2 (England) Nathan Holland West Ham United U23s, (Republic of Ireland) Anthony Scully West Ham United U23s (12 Goals Each)
- Biggest home win: Reading U23s 6–0 Newcastle United U23s (12 August 2019); West Bromwich Albion U23s 6–0 Sunderland U23s (23 August 2019); Everton U23s 8–2 Southampton U23s (30 August 2019)
- Biggest away win: West Bromwich Albion U23s 0–5 Manchester United U23s (9 August 2019)
- Highest scoring: Everton U23s 8–2 Southampton U23s
- Longest winning run: 7 Matches Manchester United U23s; West Ham United U23s
- Longest unbeaten run: 18 matches Full season Chelsea U23s; West Ham United U23s
- Longest winless run: 18 matches Full Season Sunderland U23s (12 August 2019 – 1 March 2020)
- Longest losing run: 17 matches Sunderland U23s (18 August 2019– 1 March 2020)
- Highest attendance: 5,731 Tottenham Hotspur U23s 3–1 Manchester City U23s (16 August 2019)
- Lowest attendance: 40 Wolverhampton Wanderers U23s 1–1 Chelsea U23s (23 November 2019)

=== Division 1 ===
==== Table ====
Pos	Club	P	W	D	L	F	A	GD	Pts
1	Chelsea U23s (C)	18	10	8	0	34	20	+14	38
2	Leicester City U23s	18	10	5	3	36	21	+15	35
3	Brighton & Hove Albion U23s	18	10	1	7	36	26	+10	31
4	Derby County U23s	18	7	6	5	33	32	+1	27
5	Liverpool U23s	17	7	5	5	34	34	0	26
6	Arsenal U23s	18	6	7	5	32	32	0	25
7	Everton U23s	18	5	7	6	32	33	–1	22
8	Blackburn Rovers U23s	17	6	3	8	27	26	+1	21
9	Manchester City U23s	18	6	3	9	30	29	+1	21
10	Tottenham Hotspur U23s	18	6	3	9	31	34	–3	21
11	Southampton U23s	18	4	3	11	23	47	–24	15
12	Wolverhampton Wanderers U23s (R)	18	2	5	11	21	35	–14	11

==== Results ====
Home \ Away	ARS	BLA	B&H	CHE	DER	EVE	LEI	LIV	MNC	SOU	TOT	WOL
Arsenal U23s		3–1	2–1	1–2	2–2	2–2	2–1	2–2	2–4	1–0	–	–
Blackburn Rovers U23s	1–3		1–2	–	2–0	–	3–1	–	0–3	2–2	4–0	1–2
Brighton & Hove Albion U23s	1–0	3–5		–	1–2	1–2	0–1	3–5	2–1	–	4–1	2–0
Chelsea U23s	3–1	2–1	2–1		3–3	1–0	–	3–0	2–1	–	2–2	–
Derby County U23s	2–2	1–0	1–4	0–1		4–1	–	–	2–0	4–2	2–2	2–2
Everton U23s	3–3	2–1	–	2–2	2–1		0–0	–	2–2	8–2	1–3	3–2
Leicester City U23s	–	1–1	0–3	2–2	4–1	2–1		2–2	–	3–0	3–2	5–1
Liverpool U23s	3–0	0–0	–	1–1	3–3	2–1	–		1–4	5–0	0–4	4–3
Manchester City EDS	1–1	–	0–1	2–2	–	4–1	0–2	1–0		3–4	2–0	1–2
Southampton U23s	–	1–3	1–4	0–2	0–1	–	1–3	2–4	2–0		–	1–0
Tottenham Hotspur U23s	1–3	–	1–2	0–1	1–2	1–1	0–2	4–0	3–1	2–2		3–2
Wolverhampton Wanderers U23s	2–2	0–1	1–1	1–1	–	0–0	0–2	1–2	–	1–2	1–2	

Source: Premier League 2 Division 1 results
Legend: Blue = home team win; Yellow = draw; Red = away team win.

=== Division 2 ===
==== Table ====
Pos	Club	P	W	D	L	F	A	GD	Pts
1	West Ham United U23s (P)	18	14	4	0	58	21	+37	46
2	Manchester United U23s (P)	17	14	1	2	45	17	+28	43
3	West Bromwich Albion U23s	16	11	1	4	38	22	+16	34
4	Stoke City U23s	18	8	3	7	32	27	+5	27
5	Middlesbrough U23s	18	8	2	8	34	43	–9	26
6	Newcastle United U23s	18	8	1	9	29	32	–3	25
7	Aston Villa U23s	17	6	4	7	27	28	–1	22
8	Swansea City U23s	17	6	3	8	22	32	–10	21
9	Reading U23s	18	6	2	10	35	37	–2	20
10	Fulham U23s	18	6	2	10	26	32	–6	20
11	Norwich City U23s	17	5	2	10	23	35	–12	17
12	Sunderland U23s	18	0	1	17	10	53	–43	1

==== Results ====
Home \ Away	AST	FUL	MNU	MID	NEW	NOR	REA	STK	SUN	SWA	WBA	WHU
Aston Villa U23s		1–0	4–1	5–3	3–2	1–1	1–3	–	4–0	1–1	0–1	–
Fulham U23s	2–0		–	2–4	1–2	–	5–4	0–2	4–0	1–1	1–3	3–3
Manchester United U23s	–	1–0		–	2–1	2–0	2–0	3–1	3–0	–	3–1	2–2
Middlesbrough U23s	1–0	1–0	1–4		0–2	3–4	2–1	0–2	–	3–2	–	3–4
Newcastle United U23s	–	3–0	0–4	2–2		3–2	0–1	4–2	2–0	0–1	–	1–2
Norwich City U23s	2–1	1–2	1–2	2–2	–		–	0–2	3–1	0–1	2–4	1–4
Reading U23s	3–3	–	1–4	0–1	6–0	0–1		0–4	–	5–0	2–1	3–3
Stoke City U23s	2–0	0–1	2–3	2–3	–	–	3–0		1–1	0–1	2–2	0–4
Sunderland U23s	1–2	0–3	–	2–3	0–2	1–2	0–4	0–1		–	0–4	2–4
Swansea City U23s	1–1	–	1–4	5–1	0–4	2–1	–	3–4	1–0		0–1	2–4
West Bromwich Albion U23s	–	3–1	0–5	4–1	2–1	–	4–2	–	6–0	2–0		–
West Ham United U23s	4–0	3–0	2–0	–	4–0	4–0	3–0	2–2	4–2	–	2–0	

Source: Premier League 2 Division 2 results
Legend: Blue = home team win; Yellow = draw; Red = away team win.

== Top goalscorers ==
=== Division 1 ===
As of 6 March 2020

Rank	Player	Club	Goals
1	(United States) Folarin Balogun	Arsenal U23s	10
1	(England) Jahmal Hector-Ingram	Derby County U23s	10
3	(Netherlands) Jayden Braaf	Arsenal U23s	9
3	(Scotland) George Hirst	Leicester City U23s	9
3	(England) Curtis Jones	Liverpool U23s	9
5	(Zimbabwe) Admiral Muskwe	Leicester City U23s	8
5	(England) Ellis Simms	Everton U23s	8
8	(Iraq) Peter Gwargis	Brighton & Hove Albion U23s	7

=== Division 2 ===
As of 6 March 2020

Rank	Player	Club	Goals
1	(England) Nathan Holland	West Ham United U23s	12
1	(Republic of Ireland) Anthony Scully	West Ham United U23s	12
3	(Jamaica) Rumarn Burrell	Middlesbrough U23s	10
4	(Belgium) Largie Ramazani	Manchester United U23s	9
4	(England) Rayhaan Tulloch	West Bromwich Albion U23s	9
6	(Wales) Liam Cullen	Swansea City U23s	10
6	(England) James Garner	Manchester United U23s	10
6	(England) Daniel Kemp	Reading U23s	10
6	(England) Ben Liddle	Middlesbrough U23s	10
10	(Morocco) Gassan Ahadme	Norwich City U23s	7
10	(England) Thomas Allan	Newcastle United U23s	7
10	(England) Jamie Soule	West Bromwich Albion U23s	7

=== Hat-tricks ===
As of 2 March 2020

Player	For	Against	Result	Date	Division	Ref.
(United States) Andrija Novakovich	Reading U23s	Newcastle United U23s	6–0 (H)	12 August 2019	Division 2	
(United States) Folarin Balogun	Arsenal U23s	Blackburn Rovers U23s	3–1 (H)	12 August 2019	Division 1	
(England) Martell Taylor-Crossdale	Fulham U23s	Reading U23s	5–4 (H)	20 September 2019	Division 2	
(England) Dominic Samuel	Blackburn Rovers U23s	Tottenham Hotspur U23s	4–0 (H)	23 September 2019	Division 1	
(Cameroon) Danny Loader	Reading U23s	Aston Villa U23s	3–3 (H)	28 October 2019	Division 2	
(Republic of Ireland) Jamie Bowden	Tottenham Hotspur U23s	Liverpool U23s	4–0 (H)	6 December 2019	Division 1	

Note

(H) – Home; (A) – Away

=== Awards ===
Player of the season: (England) Curtis Jones (Liverpool U23s)

=== Player of the Month ===
Month	Player	Club	Ref.
August	(Scotland) Billy Gilmour	Chelsea U23s	
September	(Republic of Ireland) Anthony Scully	West Ham United U23s	
October	(England) Jahmal Hector-Ingram	Derby County U23s	
November	(England) Nathan Holland	West Ham United U23s	
December	(Curaçao) Tahith Chong	Manchester United U23s	
January	(Wales) Liam Cullen	Swansea City U23s	
February	(Spain) Adrian Bernabe	Manchester City U23s	

== Professional Development League ==
U23 Professional Development League
- Season: 2019–20
- Champions: Nottingham Forest U23s (North Division); Millwall U23s (South Division)
- Matches: 227
- Goals: 751 (3.31 per match)
- Top goalscorer: (England) Sam Dalby Watford U23s (15 Goals)
- Biggest home win: Leeds United U23s 6–0 Watford U23s (16 September 2019); Birmingham City U23s 6–0 Bolton Wanderers U23s (1 November 2019); Nottingham Forest U23s 6–0 Bolton Wanderers U23s (22 November 2019)
- Biggest away win: Bristol City U23s 1–6 Watford U23s (6 January 2020); Bolton Wanderers U23s 0–5 Nottingham Forest U23s (9 March 2020)
- Highest scoring: Ipswich Town U23s 6–3 Bolton Wanderers U23s (9 October 2019)
- Longest winning run: 5 Matches Leeds United U23s
- Longest unbeaten run: 16 Matches Burnley U23s
- Longest winless run: 16 Matches Bolton Wanderers U23s
- Longest losing run: 13 Matches Bolton Wanderers U23s

The 2019–20 Professional Development League season was the eighth campaign of post-EPPP under-23 football's second tier, designed for those academies with Category Two status. A total of 21 teams were split regionally into north and south divisions, with each team facing opponents in their own region twice both home and away, and opponents in the other region once. The teams that finished in the top two places in both regions at the end of the season were supposed to advance to the knockout stage to determine the overall league champion, but the season was halted in March 2020 due to the COVID-19 pandemic in England. Leeds United U23s were the defending champions.

21 Teams competed in the league this season, 1 more than last season. Wigan Athletic U23s acquired Category Two status in July 2019 and joined the North Division this season after a six year absence.

=== Tables ===
Final league positions were determined by points per game methodology due to season curtailment.

==== North Division ====
Pos	Team	Pld	W	D	L	GF	GA	GD	Pts	Qualification
1	Nottingham Forest U23s (C)	21	14	5	2	53	21	+32	47	North Champions
2	Burnley U23s	21	11	8	2	41	21	+20	41	
3	Leeds United U23s	20	11	6	3	40	18	+22	39	
4	Wigan Athletic U23s	21	12	3	6	38	28	+10	39	
5	Birmingham City U23s	22	11	4	7	39	26	+13	37	
6	Hull City U23s	20	10	2	8	33	35	−2	32	
7	Crewe Alexandra U23s	23	9	3	11	36	39	−3	30	
8	Barnsley U23s	23	8	3	12	37	44	−7	27	
9	Sheffield Wednesday U23s	22	6	6	10	36	40	−4	24	
10	Sheffield United U23s	25	5	5	15	32	48	−16	20	
11	Bolton Wanderers U23s	22	1	1	20	16	74	−58	4	

Source: premierleague.com
(C) Champions

==== South Division ====
Pos	Team	Pld	W	D	L	GF	GA	GD	Pts	Qualification
1	Millwall U23s (C)	21	11	5	5	35	22	+13	38	South Champions
2	Watford U23s	23	12	5	6	52	37	+15	41	
3	Coventry City U23s	22	11	6	5	33	28	+5	39	
4	Charlton Athletic U23s	21	9	6	6	41	33	+8	33	
5	Cardiff City U23s	23	9	5	9	33	38	−5	32	
6	Queens Park Rangers U23s	21	7	8	6	40	35	+5	29	
7	Bristol City U23s	21	7	4	10	29	39	−10	25	
8	Ipswich Town U23s	20	6	5	9	31	36	−5	23	
9	Crystal Palace U23s	21	4	4	13	27	38	−11	16	
10	Colchester United U23s	21	4	4	13	29	51	−22	16	

Source: premierleague.com
(C) Champions

=== Top goalscorers ===
As of 12 March 2020

Rank	Player	Club	Goals
1	(England) Sam Dalby	Watford U23s	15
2	(England) George Alexander	Millwall U23s	14
3	(Wales) Brennan Johnson	Nottingham Forest U23s	12
4	(England) Joseph Hungbo	Watford U23s	11
5	(France) Max Biamou	Nottingham Forest U23s	8
5	(England) Ryan Edmondson	Leeds United U23s	8
5	(England) Michael Fernandes	Colchester United U23s	8
5	(England) Ali Koiki	Burnley U23s	8
5	(Scotland) Fraser Preston	Sheffield Wednesday U23s	8
5	(Angola) Elliot Simoes	Barnsley U23s	8
5	(England) Reece York	Sheffield United U23s	8

=== Hat-tricks ===
As of 12 March 2020

Player	For	Against	Result	Date	Ref.
(England) Ali Koiki	Burnley U23s	Ipswich Town U23s	3–1 (H)	19 September 2019	
(England) Charlie Jolley	Wigan Athletic U23s	Watford U23s	1–4 (A)	26 September 2019	
(Norway) Chuma Anene	Crewe Alexandra U23s	Sheffield United U23s	5–1 (H)	23 October 2019	
(England) Brandon Pierrick	Crystal Palace U23s	Millwall U23s	4–2 (H)	25 November 2019	
(England) Sam Dalby	Watford U23s	Bristol City U23s	1–6 (A)	6 January 2020	
(England) Aaron Lomas	Crewe Alexandra U23s	Sheffield United U23s	2–3 (A)	20 January 2020	

Note

(H) – Home; (A) – Away

== See also ==
- 2019–20 in English football
