= 2017–18 Professional U23 Development League =

English football league season

The 2017–18 Professional U23 Development League was the sixth season of the Professional Development League system.

== Premier League 2 ==
Premier League 2
- Season: 2017–18
- Champions: Arsenal U23s (1st Title); Division 2 Blackburn Rovers U23s (1st Title)
- Promoted: Blackburn Rovers U23s; Brighton & Hove Albion U23s
- Relegated: Sunderland U23s; Manchester United U23s
- Matches: 267 (264 RS, 3 PO)
- Goals: 951 (3.56 per match) (939 RS, 12 PO)
- Best player: (England) Reiss Nelson Arsenal U23s
- Top goalscorer: Overall (Germany) Lukas Nmecha Manchester City U23s (15 Goals); Division 1 (Germany) Lukas Nmecha Manchester City U23s (15 Goals); Division 2 (England) Joe Nuttall Blackburn Rovers U23s (14 Goals)
- Biggest home win: Aston Villa U23s 6–0 Newcastle United U23s (30 October 2017)
- Biggest away win: Sunderland U23s 0–5 Chelsea U23s (14 January 2018); Wolverhampton Wanderers U23s 0–5 Brighton & Hove Albion U23s (23 April 2018); Tottenham Hotspur U23s 0–5 Manchester City U23s (2 May 2018)
- Highest scoring: Reading U23s 3–5 Blackburn Rovers U23s (18 August 2017); Southampton U23s 6–2 Newcastle United U23s (16 October 2017)
- Longest winning run: 6 Matches Liverpool U23s
- Longest unbeaten run: 11 Matches Leicester City U23s
- Longest winless run: 9 Matches West Bromwich Albion U23s
- Longest losing run: 7 Matches Newcastle United U23s
- Highest attendance: 5,049 Liverpool U23s 1–2 Manchester United U23s (9 March 2018)
- Lowest attendance: 15 West Bromwich Albion U23s 1–1 Stoke City U23s (12 March 2018)

=== Division 1 ===
==== Table ====
Pos	Team	Pld	W	D	L	GF	GA	GD	Pts
1	Arsenal U23s (C)	22	13	3	6	48	32	+16	42
2	Liverpool U23s	22	13	1	8	43	27	+16	40
3	Leicester City U23s	22	11	6	5	36	20	+16	39
4	Swansea City U23s	22	11	4	7	40	31	+9	37
5	West Ham United U23s	22	9	4	9	30	32	−2	31
6	Manchester City U23s	22	8	6	8	41	31	+10	30
7	Everton U23s	22	9	3	10	32	36	−4	30
8	Chelsea U23s	22	8	5	9	34	35	−1	29
9	Tottenham Hotspur U23s	22	7	5	10	38	48	−10	26
10	Derby County U23s	22	7	3	12	32	44	−12	24
11	Sunderland U23s (R)	22	6	4	12	19	39	−20	22
12	Manchester United U23s (R)	22	4	8	10	22	40	−18	20

Updated to match(es) played on 13 May 2018. Source:
(C) Champions; (R) Relegated

==== Results ====
Home \ Away	ARS	CHE	DER	EVE	LEI	LIV	MNC	MNU	SUN	SWA	TOT	WHU
Arsenal U23s		3–1	3–3	4–0	1–0	1–2	4–3	4–0	2–0	1–0	1–3	3–0
Chelsea U23s	2–2		2–0	0–3	1–0	1–3	3–2	2–2	2–2	1–3	1–2	0–0
Derby County U23s	2–3	0–3		0–1	0–2	2–0	0–4	1–1	2–0	3–3	1–0	1–0
Everton U23s	4–2	2–1	1–3		0–1	1–3	3–4	0–0	0–1	2–0	4–1	0–4
Leicester City U23s	3–1	2–0	3–1	2–1		4–0	0–0	0–1	0–0	2–0	6–1	3–1
Liverpool U23s	1–1	5–1	1–0	4–0	1–2		1–0	1–2	3–0	1–3	4–2	0–1
Manchester City U23s	0–1	0–0	4–1	0–3	2–2	3–2		1–1	2–2	0–1	4–2	0–1
Manchester United U23s	0–2	0–4	1–2	2–2	1–1	1–3	1–1		4–0	1–1	1–3	0–3
Sunderland U23s	1–3	0–5	2–1	2–1	4–1	1–4	0–2	0–1		0–2	2–1	1–2
Swansea City U23s	3–1	2–0	5–2	1–2	3–1	0–2	1–3	2–0	1–0		2–2	3–0
Tottenham Hotspur U23s	3–2	2–3	4–2	1–2	1–1	1–0	0–5	3–0	0–0	2–2		2–3
West Ham United U23s	1–3	0–1	1–5	0–0	0–0	0–2	2–1	4–2	0–1	5–2	2–2	

Source: Premier League 2 Division 1 results
Legend: Blue = home team win; Yellow = draw; Red = away team win.

=== Division 2 ===
==== Table ====
Pos	Team	Pld	W	D	L	GF	GA	GD	Pts	Promotion or qualification
1	Blackburn Rovers U23s (P)	22	15	4	3	47	20	+27	49	Promotion to Division 1
2	Aston Villa U23s	22	14	1	7	51	29	+22	43	Qualification for Play-offs
3	Brighton & Hove Albion U23s (P)	22	11	7	4	46	25	+21	40	Qualification for Play-offs
4	Middlesbrough U23s	22	11	4	7	41	36	+5	37	Qualification for Play-offs
5	Reading U23s	22	10	4	8	38	44	−6	34	Qualification for Play-offs
6	Southampton U23s	22	10	3	9	41	37	+4	33	
7	Fulham U23s	22	9	3	10	38	37	+1	30	
8	Norwich City U23s	22	8	6	8	32	33	−1	30	
9	Wolverhampton Wanderers U23s	22	8	4	10	30	41	−11	28	
10	Newcastle United U23s	22	6	3	13	29	45	−16	21	
11	Stoke City U23s	22	6	2	14	31	46	−15	20	
12	West Bromwich Albion U23s	22	2	3	17	21	52	−31	9	

Updated to match(es) played on 12 May 2018. Source:
(P) Promoted

==== Results ====
Home \ Away	AST	BLB	B&H	FUL	MID	NEW	NOR	REA	SOT	STO	WBA	WOL
Aston Villa U23s		0–3	1–0	1–3	4–0	6–0	0–1	3–1	4–0	1–2	3–1	6–1
Blackburn Rovers U23s	0–1		0–2	4–0	1–3	2–0	2–1	2–0	1–0	2–0	2–2	5–1
Brighton & Hove Albion U23s	3–0	2–2		4–2	2–2	0–0	1–1	1–2	1–1	5–1	5–1	1–1
Fulham U23s	2–3	0–1	1–1		1–2	3–0	2–0	2–2	0–2	2–1	3–0	0–3
Middlesbrough U23s	4–1	3–3	0–3	0–2		1–0	4–0	3–4	3–3	2–1	2–1	3–1
Newcastle United U23s	2–0	0–2	0–2	1–1	0–1		2–2	4–1	1–5	0–2	2–0	0–1
Norwich City U23s	1–2	1–1	1–2	0–3	1–0	4–3		2–0	3–0	2–0	1–1	2–1
Reading U23s	3–2	3–5	2–1	2–1	2–3	1–4	2–2		1–1	3–1	2–0	0–0
Southampton U23s	1–4	0–1	0–1	3–4	2–1	6–2	2–1	4–0		3–0	3–2	2–4
Stoke City U23s	1–3	0–1	2–3	4–1	3–2	3–4	1–3	2–3	0–2		4–2	1–0
West Bromwich Albion U23s	1–4	1–4	5–1	2–1	0–1	0–4	0–2	0–2	0–1	1–1		1–2
Wolverhampton Wanderers U23s	0–2	0–3	0–5	1–4	1–1	2–0	4–2	1–2	3–0	1–1	2–0	

Source: Premier League 2 Division 2 results
Legend: Blue = home team win; Yellow = draw; Red = away team win.

=== Play-offs ===
Semifinals
2	Aston Villa U23s	4
5	Reading U23s	3
3	Brighton & Hove Albion U23s	3
4	Middlesbrough U23s	0

Final
2	Aston Villa U23s	0
3	Brighton & Hove Albion U23s	2

==== Semifinals ====
27 April 2018

Brighton & Hove Albion U23s	3–0	Middlesbrough U23s
Gyökeres 71', 80'; Bjørdal 78'	Report

AMEX Stadium, Falmer
Attendance: 640
Referee: David Rock

1 May 2018

Aston Villa U23s	4–3	Reading U23s
Hepburn-Murphy 62', 90+4'; Suliman 64'; Blackett-Taylor 79'	Report	Osho 61'; McIntyre 75'; Howe 81'

Villa Park, Birmingham
Attendance: 1,044
Referee: Joseph Johnson

==== Final ====
12 May 2018
7:00

Aston Villa U23s	0–2	Brighton & Hove Albion U23s
	Report	Bjørdal 23'; Connolly 69'

Villa Park, Birmingham
Attendance: 1,869
Referee: Conor Farrell

=== Top goalscorers ===
==== Division 1 ====
As of 12 May 2018

Rank	Player	Club	Goals
1	(Germany) Lukas Nmecha	Manchester City U23s	15
2	(England) Edward Nketiah	Arsenal U23s	12
3	(Scotland) Oliver McBurnie	Swansea City U23s	10
3	(Wales) Harry Wilson	Liverpool U23s	10
5	(Scotland) George Byers	Swansea City U23s	9
5	(Spain) Toni Martínez	West Ham United U23s	9
5	(Wales) George Thomas	Leicester City U23s	9
8	(England) Keanan Bennetts	Tottenham Hotspur U23s	8
8	(England) Reiss Nelson	Arsenal U23s	8
8	(England) Sam Hughes	Leicester City U23s	8
8	(England) Kazaiah Sterling	Tottenham Hotspur U23s	8
12	(England) Luke Thomas	Derby County U23s	7

==== Division 2 ====
As of 12 May 2018

Rank	Player	Club	Goals
1	(England) Joe Nuttall	Blackburn Rovers U23s	14
2	(England) Tyrese Campbell	Stoke City U23s	13
3	(England) Callum O'Hare	Aston Villa U23s	10
3	(England) George Miller	Middlesbrough U23s	10
5	(England) Elijah Adebayo	Fulham U23s	9
5	(Republic of Ireland) Aaron Connolly	Brighton & Hove Albion U23s	9
5	(England) Rushian Hepburn-Murphy	Aston Villa U23s	9
8	(Republic of Ireland) Joshua Barrett	Reading U23s	9
8	(Norway) Henrik Bjørdal	Brighton & Hove Albion U23s	9
10	(Sweden) Viktor Gyokeres	Brighton & Hove Albion U23s	8
10	(England) Sam Smith	Reading U23s	8
10	(Iceland) Jon Dagur Thorsteinsson	Fulham U23s	8

=== Hat-tricks ===
As of 12 May 2018

Player	For	Against	Result	Date	Division	Ref.
(England) Joe Nuttall	Blackburn Rovers U23s	Wolverhampton Wanderers U23s	5–1 (H)	14 August 2017	Division 2	
(England) Marcus Tavernier	Middlesbrough U23s	Norwich City U23s	4–0 (H)	18 August 2017	Division 2	
(England) George Miller	Middlesbrough U23s	Aston Villa U23s	4–1 (H)	15 September 2017	Division 2	
(Wales) Harry Wilson	Liverpool U23s	Tottenham Hotspur U23s	4–2 (H)	22 September 2017	Division 1	
(Scotland) Oliver McBurnie	Swansea City U23s	Chelsea U23s	1–3 (A)	13 October 2017	Division 1	
(Spain) Antonio Martinez	West Ham United U23s	Manchester United U23s	4–2 (H)	15 October 2017	Division 1	
(Germany) Lukas Nmecha	Manchester City U23s	Derby County U23s	4–1 (H)	21 October 2017	Division 1	
(Iceland) Jon Dagur Thorsteinsson	Fulham U23s	Wolverhampton Wanderers U23s	1–4 (A)	23 October 2017	Division 2	
(England) Callum O'Hare	Aston Villa U23s	Newcastle United U23s	6–0 (H)	30 October 2017	Division 2	
(Germany) Lukas Nmecha	Manchester City U23s	Tottenham Hotspur U23s	4–2 (H)	25 November 2017	Division 1	
(England) Donovan Wilson	Wolverhampton Wanderers U23s	Southampton U23s	2–4 (A)	11 December 2017	Division 2	
(England) Callum Hudson-Odoi	Chelsea U23s	Sunderland U23s	0–5 (A)	13 January 2018	Division 1	
(England) Edward Nketiah	Arsenal U23s	Everton U23s	5–0 (H)	5 February 2018	Division 1	
(England) Tyrese Campbell	Stoke City U23s	Fulham U23s	4–1 (H)	17 February 2018	Division 2	
(Germany) Lukas Nmecha	Manchester City U23s	Derby County U23s	0–4 (A)	9 March 2018	Division 1	
(Netherlands) Daishawn Redan	Chelsea U23s	Derby County U23s	0–3 (A)	30 March 2018	Division 1	
(England) Marcus Browne	West Ham United U23s	Everton U23s	0–4 (A)	9 April 2018	Division 1	
(Republic of Ireland) Aaron Connolly	Brighton & Hove Albion U23s	Wolverhampton Wanderers U23s	0–5 (A)	23 April 2018	Division 2	
(England) Sam Smith	Reading U23s	Stoke City U23s	3–1 (H)	23 April 2018	Division 2	

Note

(H) – Home; (A) – Away

=== Awards ===
Player of the season: (England) Reiss Nelson (Arsenal U23s)

=== Player of the Month ===
Month	Player	Club	Ref.
August	(England) Reiss Nelson	Arsenal U23s	
September	(Wales) Harry Wilson	Liverpool U23s	
October	(England) Declan Rice	West Ham United U23s	
November	(England) Phil Foden	Manchester City U23s	
December	(England) Donovan Wilson	Wolverhampton Wanderers U23s	
January	(England) Callum Hudson-Odoi	Chelsea U23s	
February	(England) Tyrese Campbell	Stoke City U23s	
March	(England) Harvey Barnes	Leicester City U23s	
April	(England) Rushian Hepburn-Murphy	Aston Villa U23s	

== Professional Development League ==
U23 Professional Development League
- Season: 2017–18
- Champions: Bolton Wanderers U23s (1st Title)
- Regular Season Champions: Crystal Palace U23s (1st Title)
- Matches: 313 (310 RS, 3 PO)
- Goals: 1,020 (3.26 per match) (1012 RS, 8 PO)
- Top goalscorer: (England) Connor Hall Bolton Wanderers U23s (22 Goals)
- Biggest home win: Ipswich Town U23s 6–0 Coventry City U23s (18 December 2017)
- Biggest away win: Burnley U23s 0–5 Birmingham City U23s (15 February 2018); Nottingham Forest U23s 0–5 Sheffield United U23s (23 February 2018); Cardiff City U23s 0–5 Nottingham Forest U23s (23 April 2018)
- Highest scoring: Bristol City U23s 5–5 Watford U23s (6 February 2018)
- Longest winning run: 5 Matches Crystal Palace U23s
- Longest unbeaten run: 10 Matches Nottingham Forest U23s
- Longest winless run: 9 Matches Bristol City U23s
- Longest losing run: 5 Matches Burnley U23s

The Professional Development League is the sixth campaign of post-EPPP Under-23 football's second tier, designed for those academies with Category 2 status. A total of 21 teams are split regionally into north and south divisions, with each team facing opponents in their own region twice both home and away and opponents in the other region once for a total of 30 games each in the North Division, and 29 games in the South division.

At the end of the season, the teams finishing in the top two positions of both divisions will meet in the knockout stage to determine the overall league champion. Burnley U23s were officially granted Category Two status in the summer of 2017 and became the league's 21st team.

=== Tables ===
==== North Division ====
Pos	Team	Pld	W	D	L	GF	GA	GD	Pts	Qualification
1	Bolton Wanderers U23s	30	16	3	11	50	44	+6	51	Qualification for Knock-out stage
2	Nottingham Forest U23s	30	13	11	6	65	50	+15	50	Qualification for Knock-out stage
3	Sheffield Wednesday U23s	30	14	8	8	48	39	+9	50	
4	Sheffield United U23s	30	14	3	13	50	43	+7	45	
5	Hull City U23s	30	14	3	13	47	57	−10	45	
6	Leeds United U23s	30	13	5	12	50	46	+4	44	
7	Huddersfield Town U23s	30	12	5	13	49	53	−4	41	
8	Birmingham City U23s	30	10	8	12	46	42	+4	38	
9	Crewe Alexandra U23s	30	10	5	15	38	53	−15	35	
10	Burnley U23s	30	10	4	16	33	54	−21	34	
11	Barnsley U23s	30	9	6	15	49	55	−6	33	

==== South Division ====
Pos	Team	Pld	W	D	L	GF	GA	GD	Pts	Qualification
1	Crystal Palace U23s	29	19	3	7	67	31	+36	60	Qualification for Knock-out stage
2	Charlton Athletic U23s	29	14	6	9	51	39	+12	48	Qualification for Knock-out stage
3	Ipswich Town U23s	29	13	5	11	61	49	+12	44	
4	Watford U23s	29	11	8	10	56	44	+12	41	
5	Coventry City U23s	29	11	6	12	54	60	−6	39	
6	Queens Park Rangers U23s	29	11	5	13	54	59	−5	38	
7	Colchester United U23s	29	10	7	12	39	48	−9	37	
8	Millwall U23s	29	9	10	10	28	38	−10	37	
9	Cardiff City U23s	29	10	5	14	38	51	−13	35	
10	Bristol City U23s	29	5	8	16	39	57	−18	23	

=== Knock-out stage ===
Semi-finals

1 May 2018
19:00

Bolton Wanderers U23s	3–1	Charlton Athletic U23s
King 15'; Politic 41'; Edwards 76'	Report	Hackett-Fairchild 65'

Macron Stadium, Horwich
Attendance: 329

1 May 2018
19:00

Crystal Palace U23s	0–1 (a.e.t.)	Nottingham Forest U23s
		Gomis 93'

Selhurst Park, Selhurst

Final

4 May 2018
19:00

Nottingham Forest U23s	1–2	Bolton Wanderers U23s
Preston 77'	Report	Duke-McKenna 6'; Politic 44'

City Ground, West Bridgford
Attendance: 1,200
Referee: Scott Simpson

=== Top goalscorers ===
As of 4 May 2018

Rank	Player	Club	Goals
1	(England) Connor Hall	Bolton Wanderers U23s	22
2	(France) Virgil Gomis	Nottingham Forest U23s	20
3	(Nigeria) Victor Adeboyejo	Barnsley U23s	17
3	(England) Tyler Smith	Sheffield United U23s	17
5	(England) Aramide Oteh	Queens Park Rangers U23s	16
6	(England) Jordan Ponticelli	Coventry City U23s	15
6	(England) Lewis Reilly	Crewe Alexandra U23s	15
8	(England) Levi Lumeka	Crystal Palace U23s	14
8	(Antigua and Barbuda) Dion Pereira	Watford U23s	14
10	(Wales) Mark Harris	Cardiff City U23s	12
11	(England) Michael Folivi	Watford U23s	11
11	(England) Kyle McFarlane	Birmingham City U23s	11
11	(Northern Ireland) Conor McKendry	Ipswich Town U23s	11
14	(England) James Daly	Crystal Palace U23s	7
14	(Australia) Ben Folami	Ipswich Town U23s	7
14	(Democratic Republic of the Congo) Jason Lokilo	Crystal Palace U23s	7
14	(England) Ben Morris	Ipswich Town U23s	7
14	(England) Aaron Smith	Nottingham Forest U23s	7

=== Hat-tricks ===
As of 4 May 2018

Player	For	Against	Result	Date	Ref.
(England) Lewis White	Millwall U23s	Huddersfield Town U23s	4–0 (H)	14 August 2017	
(England) Ebere Eze	Queens Park Rangers U23s	Hull City U23s	4–1 (H)	14 August 2017	
(Italy) Diego De Girolamo	Bristol City U23s	Burnley U23s	3–1 (H)	29 August 2017	
(Republic of Ireland) Anthony Pilkington	Cardiff City U23s	Charlton Athletic U23s	4–3 (H)	25 September 2017	
(Republic of Ireland) Olamide Shodipo	Queens Park Rangers U23s	Charlton Athletic U23s	4–5 (A)	16 October 2017	
(England) Tyler Smith	Sheffield United U23s	Burnley U23s	1–6 (A)	23 October 2017	
(England) Connor Hall	Bolton Wanderers U23s	Hull City U23s	6–1 (H)	6 November 2017	
(Sierra Leone) Sullay Kaikai	Crystal Palace U23s	Colchester United U23s	4–0 (H)	20 November 2017	
(England) Joe Lolley	Huddersfield Town U23s	Barnsley U23s	4–1 (H)	20 November 2017	
(England) Connor Hall	Bolton Wanderers U23s	Crewe Alexandra U23s	5–2 (H)	27 November 2017	
(Northern Ireland) Conor McKendry	Ipswich Town U23s	Coventry City U23s	6–0 (H)	18 December 2017	
(England) Greg Luer	Hull City U23s	Crewe Alexandra U23s	5–1 (H)	8 January 2018	
(England) Jordan Ponticelli	Coventry City U23s	Bristol City U23s	1–5 (A)	9 January 2018	
(Republic of Ireland) Joshua Barrett	Coventry City U23s	Crystal Palace U23s	6–1 (H)	15 January 2018	
(England) Decarrey Sherriff	Colchester United U23s	Ipswich Town U23s	5–2 (H)	6 February 2018	
(Republic of Ireland) Ryan Cassidy	Watford U23s	Bristol City U23s	5–5 (A)	9 February 2018	
(England) James Daly	Crystal Palace U23s	Queens Park Rangers U23s	3–0 (H)	19 February 2018	
(England) Jake Wright	Sheffield United U23s	Nottingham Forest U23s	0–5 (A)	23 February 2018	
(Republic of Ireland) Aaron Drinan	Ipswich Town U23s	Hull City U23s	3–4 (H)	9 April 2018	
(England) Rekeil Pyke	Huddersfield Town U23s	Watford U23s	3–4 (A)	23 April 2018	
(France) Virgil Gomis	Nottingham Forest U23s	Cardiff City U23s	0–5 (A)	23 April 2018	

Note

(H) – Home; (A) – Away

== See also ==
- 2017–18 Professional U18 Development League
- 2017–18 Premier League Cup
- 2017–18 in English football
