= Derek Geary =

Irish footballer (born 1980)

Personal information
- Full name: Derek Peter Geary
- Date of birth: 19 June 1980 (age 46)
- Place of birth: Dublin, Ireland
- Position: Full-back

Youth career
- 1997: Rivermount Boys

Senior career*
Years	Team	Apps	(Gls)
1997–2004	Sheffield Wednesday	104	(0)
2004	Stockport County	13	(0)
2004–2010	Sheffield United	94	(1)
Total		211	(1)
- * Club domestic league appearances and goals

Derek Peter Geary (born 19 June 1980) is an Irish former professional footballer who played as a full-back. He is the Sheffield United Academy manager.

== Club career ==
=== Sheffield Wednesday ===
Derek is one of the few players to have played for both sides in Sheffield. He was signed by Sheffield Wednesday from Rivermount Boys of Finglas in Dublin, his only schoolboy club, on 11 November 1997, he made 104 league appearances for the Owls and won the player of the season award for the 2001–02 season.

=== Stockport County ===
On 26 July 2004 he joined Stockport County and made 13 appearances before transferring to Sheffield United for £25,000 on 22 October 2004.

=== Sheffield United ===
Geary became the third ex-Sheffield Wednesday player to be signed by Neil Warnock that season (the others being Alan Quinn and Leigh Bromby).

Geary made his first start for the Blades in a 3–2 away victory over Crewe at the end of December. His one and only senior career goal came for the Blades in a 2–1 away victory over Millwall in December 2004 where he scored a late winner.

Making 26 appearances in the Premiership for the Blades in season 2006–07, he subsequently signed a contract extension to keep him at Bramall Lane for a further three years in July 2007.

After being out of action for 18 months with a serious knee injury, Geary made his return to the first team in a 2–2 draw with Barnsley at Oakwell on 9 November 2009, replacing Matthew Kilgallon shortly before half time.

In June 2016 it was announced that he would take over as lead Coach of Sheffield United U18s.

== International career ==
On 8 May 2007, Geary was named in the Republic of Ireland squad by manager Steve Staunton for a two match trip to the US to play Ecuador and Bolivia, of which both games were drawn 1–1. However, due to hip and thigh injuries received in the last game of the season playing for Sheffield United against Wigan Athletic, he was forced to withdraw from the squad.

== Career statistics ==
Appearances and goals by club, season and competition
Club	Season	League			FA Cup		League Cup		Other		Total	
Club	Season	Division	Apps	Goals	Apps	Goals	Apps	Goals	Apps	Goals	Apps	Goals
Sheffield Wednesday	2000–01	Division One	5	0	0	0	5	0	—		10	0
Sheffield Wednesday	2001–02	Division One	32	0	1	0	6	0	—		39	0
Sheffield Wednesday	2002–03	Division One	26	0	0	0	2	0	—		28	0
Sheffield Wednesday	2003–04	Division Two	41	0	3	0	1	0	5 (Note: Appearance(s) in Football League Trophy)	0	50	0
Sheffield Wednesday	Total		104	0	4	0	14	0	5	0	127	0
Stockport County	2004–05	League One	13	0	—		1	0	1	0	15	0
Sheffield United	2004–05	Championship	19	1	5	0	—		—		24	1
Sheffield United	2005–06	Championship	20	0	0	0	3	0	—		23	0
Sheffield United	2006–07	Premier League	26	0	1	0	1	0	—		28	0
Sheffield United	2007–08	Championship	21	0	4	0	3	0	—		28	0
Sheffield United	2008–09	Championship	1	0	0	0	2	0	0	0	3	0
Sheffield United	2009–10	Championship	7	0	2	0	0	0	—		9	0
Sheffield United	Total		94	1	12	0	9	0	0	0	115	1
Career total			211	1	16	0	24	0	6	0	257	1
