= Professional Development League =

The Professional Development League is a system of English youth football leagues that are managed, organised and controlled by the Premier League or by the Football League. It was introduced by the Football Association via the Elite Player Performance Plan in 2012.

The system was introduced in early 2012 and was active for the first time during the 2012–13 season. It is a successor to the Premier Reserve League, Premier Academy League and Football Combination. The Football League Youth Alliance makes up League 2 of the under-18 system. The system covers the under-18 and under-21 groups.

Previously, clubs participating in the Premier Reserve League (the highest level of reserve football in England) were removed from the competition if their first team in the Premier League were relegated and replaced with a promoted team. Under the Professional Development League system, Premier League reserves teams' league status is not directly linked to the first team's Premier League status. Instead, there are three different Professional Development Leagues at each age-group level and clubs in the top four tiers of the English football league system are placed in the system based on the assessment of their academy for the Elite Player Performance Plan.

== Under-21 level ==
=== Premier League 2 ===
Premier League 2
- Domestic cup(s): Premier League Cup; EFL Trophy; National League Cup
- International cup: Premier League International Cup
- Current champions: Brighton & Hove Albion (1st title)
- Most championships: Manchester City (4 titles)
- Website: Official website
- Current: 2026–27 Premier League 2

From 2012 to 2016, EPPP Category 1 academies' most senior youth league was an under-21 league known as the U21 Premier League, with four over-age outfield players being permitted to play. From the 2016–17 season onwards, the competition is known as the Premier League 2 and the age limit was increased from under-21 to under-23. This change was reverted for the 2022–23 season onwards, with the competition once again being restricted to under-21 players. In order to help with the transition, teams were allowed up to five over-age outfield players, up from three, and one over-age goalkeeper for the 2022–23 season only.

The competition was split into two divisions, with promotion and relegation between each, from its inception in 2012 until the 2022–23 season. From the 2023–24 season onwards, the competition consists of one division of 26 clubs in a "Swiss-style" format with 20 regular season fixtures and a 16 team knockout stage, similar to the new format of the UEFA Champions League. Clubs in Premier League 2 can also compete in the Premier League International Cup, the Premier League Cup, the EFL Trophy and the National League Cup, which is restricted to under-21 players.

==== Champions (Division 1) ====
Season	Champions
2012–13	Manchester United
2013–14	Chelsea
2014–15	Manchester United
2015–16	Manchester United
2016–17	Everton
2017–18	Arsenal
2018–19	Everton
2019–20	Chelsea
2020–21	Manchester City
2021–22	Manchester City
2022–23	Manchester City
2023–24	Tottenham Hotspur
2024–25	Manchester City
2025–26	Brighton & Hove Albion

==== Champions (Division 2) ====
Season	Champions
2014–15	Middlesbrough
2015–16	Derby County
2016–17	Swansea City
2017–18	Blackburn Rovers
2018–19	Wolverhampton Wanderers
2019–20	West Ham United
2020–21	Leeds United
2021–22	Fulham
2022–23	Southampton

=== Professional Development League ===
Professional Development League
- Current champions: Huddersfield Town (2nd title)
- Most championships: Huddersfield Town (2 titles)
- Current: 2026–27 Professional Development League

The senior youth age range for EPPP Category Two academies is the Professional Development League. The competition is split into two regional divisions, with the overall champion determined after an end of season play-off series.

==== Champions ====
Season	Champions
2012–13	Charlton Athletic
2013–14	Crewe Alexandra
2014–15	Swansea City
2015–16	Huddersfield Town
2016–17	Sheffield Wednesday
2017–18	Bolton Wanderers
2018–19	Leeds United
2019–20	Cancelled due to the COVID-19 pandemic
2020–21	Birmingham City
2021–22	Coventry City
2022–23	Millwall
2023–24	Sheffield United
2024–25	Brentford
2025–26	Huddersfield Town

== Under-18 level ==
=== Division 1 ===
U18 Premier League
- Domestic cup(s): FA Youth Cup; U18 Premier League Cup
- International cup: UEFA Youth League
- Current champions: Chelsea (3rd title)
- Most championships: Manchester City (4 titles)
- Website: Official website
- Current: 2026–27 Professional U18 Development League

An under-18 league for EPPP Category 1 academies was formed alongside the formation of the Professional Development League in 2012. Known as the U18 Premier League, the competition is split into two regional divisions (North and South). The two winners of each division contest the final to determine the overall champions. The overall winners also qualify for the UEFA Youth League.

==== Champions ====
Season	Champions
2012–13	Fulham
2013–14	Everton
2014–15	Middlesbrough
2015–16	Manchester City
2016–17	Chelsea
2017–18	Chelsea
2018–19	Derby County
2019–20	Not awarded (COVID-19 pandemic)
2020–21	Manchester City
2021–22	Manchester City
2022–23	Manchester City
2023–24	Manchester United
2024–25	Aston Villa
2025–26	Chelsea

=== Division 2 ===
U18 Professional Development League
- Domestic cup: FA Youth Cup
- Current champions: Charlton Athletic (4th title)
- Most championships: Charlton Athletic (4 titles)

The junior youth age range for EPPP Category 2 academies is the U18 Professional Development League. The competition is split into two regional divisions, with the overall champion determined after an end-of-season play-off series.

==== Champions ====
Season	Champions
2012–13	Queens Park Rangers
2013–14	Huddersfield Town
2014–15	Charlton Athletic
2015–16	Charlton Athletic
2016–17	Sheffield United
2017–18	Charlton Athletic
2018–19	Sheffield Wednesday
2019–20	Not awarded (COVID-19 pandemic)
2020–21	Wigan Athletic
2021–22	Sheffield United
2022–23	Barnsley
2023–24	Birmingham City
2024–25	Bristol City
2025–26	Charlton Athletic
