= Finley Thorndike =

English footballer (born 2002)

Personal information
- Date of birth: 5 March 2002 (age 24)
- Position: Midfielder

Team information
- Current team: Ballymena United

Youth career
- Birmingham City
- 2010–2019: West Bromwich Albion

Senior career*
Years	Team	Apps	(Gls)
2019–2021	West Bromwich Albion	0	(0)
2019	→ Alvechurch (loan)	4	(0)
2021–2022	Aston Villa	0	(0)
2022–2024	Birmingham City	0	(0)
2023	→ Boston United (loan)	8	(2)
2023–2024	→ Boston United (loan)	8	(0)
2024	→ Alvechurch (loan)	5	(1)
2024–2025	Glentoran	21	(1)
2025–2026	Crusaders	31	(4)
2026–	Ballymena United	1	(0)
- * Club domestic league appearances and goals as of 13:19, 4 September 2026 (UTC)

Finley Thorndike (born 5 March 2002) is an English professional footballer who plays as a midfielder for Ballymena United.

== Career ==
Thorndike spent his early career playing for Birmingham City, West Bromwich Albion and Aston Villa. Whilst at West Brom he spent time on loan at Alvechurch in the 2019–20 season, making five appearances in all competitions.

Thorndike returned to boyhood club Birmingham City on 1 July 2022, signing a two-year contract. He then suffered an injury, returning to play, after three months out, in January 2023.

He moved on loan to Boston United in March 2023, and returned on loan for the 2023–24 season. He was recalled by Birmingham in January 2024, and moved on loan to Alvechurch in March 2024, scoring once in six appearances in all competitions.

He was released by Birmingham at the end of the 2023–24 season.

He signed for Glentoran in August 2024, although he missed pre-season. In October 2024 he was praised by Glentoran manager Declan Devine for his performance in the County Antrim Shield quarter-final, and Thorndike then started three league matches in a row. He scored his first goal for the club on 9 November 2024.

Thorndike signed for fellow Premiership club Crusaders in July 2025. In August 2026 he moved to Ballymena United.
