= Ahmed Salam =

English association football player

Personal information
- Full name: Ahmed Mamdoh Abdel Salam
- Date of birth: 30 December 2000 (age 25)
- Place of birth: Kingston upon Hull, England
- Position: Midfielder

Team information
- Current team: Manchester 62
- Number: 10

Youth career
- 2011–2020: Hull City

Senior career*
Years	Team	Apps	(Gls)
2020–2022	Hull City	0	(0)
2020	→ Gainsborough Trinity (loan)	4	(0)
2021–2022	→ Linfield (loan)	20	(2)
2022–2023	Alfreton Town	23	(3)
2023–	Manchester 62	20	(8)
- * Club domestic league appearances and goals as of 22:48, 11 May 2024 (UTC)

Ahmed Mamdoh Abdel Salam (born 30 December 2000) is an English professional footballer who plays as a midfielder for Manchester 62 in the Gibraltar Football League.

== Career ==
A youth product of Hull City since the U11s, Salam joined Gainsborough Trinity on loan on 1 March 2020 for the rest of the 2019–20 season. Due to the COVID-19, Salam could only make 4 appearances before the season was postponed and returned to Hull City. Salam made his professional debut with Hull City in a 2–0 EFL Trophy win over Harrogate Town on 10 November 2020. On 23 March 2021, Salam signed a new one-year contract with Hull City.

On 9 July 2021, Salam joined Linfield on a season-long loan.

It was announced by Alfreton Town on 25 September 2022 that Salam had signed a contract at the club following his release from Hull City. He made his debut before the club's official signing announcement on the 24 September 2022, featuring in the first half of a 1–0 victory over Brackley Town.

In July 2023, Salam joined Gibraltar Football League side Manchester 62.

== Personal life ==
Born in England, Salam is of Egyptian descent. Salam went to Hull Trinity House School and was there from 2011 to 2016.
