= Jake Hutchinson =

English footballer (born 2002)

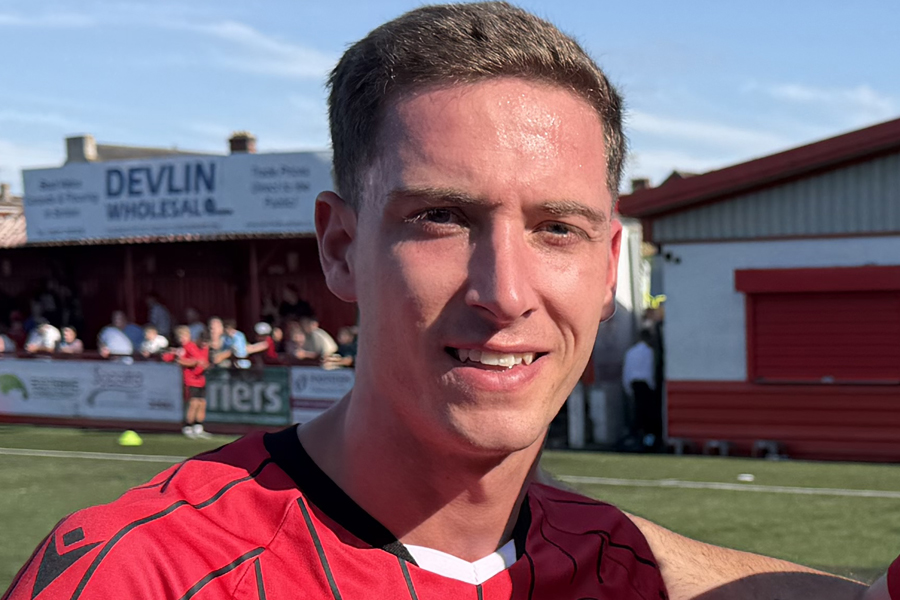
- Hutchinson in August 2026

Personal information
- Full name: Jacob Hutchinson
- Date of birth: 8 May 2002 (age 24)
- Place of birth: Eastbourne, England
- Height: 1.85 m (6 ft 1 in)
- Position: Forward

Team information
- Current team: Tamworth
- Number: 23

Youth career
- Brighton & Hove Albion
- –2018: Colchester United

Senior career*
Years	Team	Apps	(Gls)
2018–2023	Colchester United	0	(0)
2019	→ East Grinstead Town (loan)		
2019	→ Grays Athletic (loan)		
2019–2020	→ Hitchin Town (loan)	13	(6)
2020	→ Brightlingsea Regent (loan)	2	(0)
2021	→ Tonbridge Angels (loan)	5	(0)
2021–2022	→ Hitchin Town (loan)	19	(13)
2022–2023	→ Eastbourne Borough (loan)	26	(12)
2023	→ Aldershot Town (loan)	17	(4)
2023–2024	Queen of the South	13	(1)
2024	→ Eastbourne Borough (loan)	11	(0)
2024	Worthing	6	(1)
2024–2025	Enfield Town	26	(3)
2025	→ Hitchin Town (loan)	8	(2)
2025–2026	Folkestone Invicta	42	(24)
2026–	Tamworth	5	(1)
- * Club domestic league appearances and goals as of 22:00, 9 September 2026 (UTC)

Jacob Hutchinson (born 8 May 2002) is an English professional footballer who plays as a forward for National League club Tamworth.

== Career ==
=== Queen of the South ===
Jake moved to Scotland on 1 September 2023, signing for League One side Queen of the South. He made his League One debut on 2 September in a 3-2 home defeat to Montrose. Jake finished the 2023–24 recording 13 appearances and scoring one goal as Queen of the South finished in 7th position in the League One table.

Jake renewed his contract with Queen of the South on 18 May 2024.

==== Eastbourne Borough (loan) ====
On 30 January 2024, Jake re-signed for National League South side Eastbourne Borough on loan.

=== Worthing ===
Despite signing a new contract with Queen of the South, Hutchinson signed for National League South side Worthing on 19 June 2024.

=== Enfield Town ===
On 27 September 2024, Jake signed for fellow National League South side Enfield Town.

==== Hitchin Town (loan) ====
On 14 March 2025, Southern League Premier Division Central side Hitchin Town confirmed they had re-signed Hutchinson on loan for a third spell for the remainder of the season.

=== Folkestone Invicta ===
Jake signed for Isthmian League Premier Division side Folkestone Invicta on 6 June 2025.

Hutchinson made the perfect start to his new club, scoring on his debut on 9 August 2025 in an away fixture against Chichester City, scoring on the 60th minute in a match the finished 1–1.

Jake had a season to remember, notching 24 goals during the 2025–26 season, making him the Isthmian League Premier Division top goalscorer, with hat tricks in an 8–1 demolation of Cray Wanderers, and a 5–3 victory on the final day of the season over Cheshunt. Hutchinson's goals helped Folkestone Invicta win the title, and subsequent promotion to the National League South.

Folkestone Invicta confirmed that Hutchinson had departed the club on 4 June 2026.

=== Tamworth ===
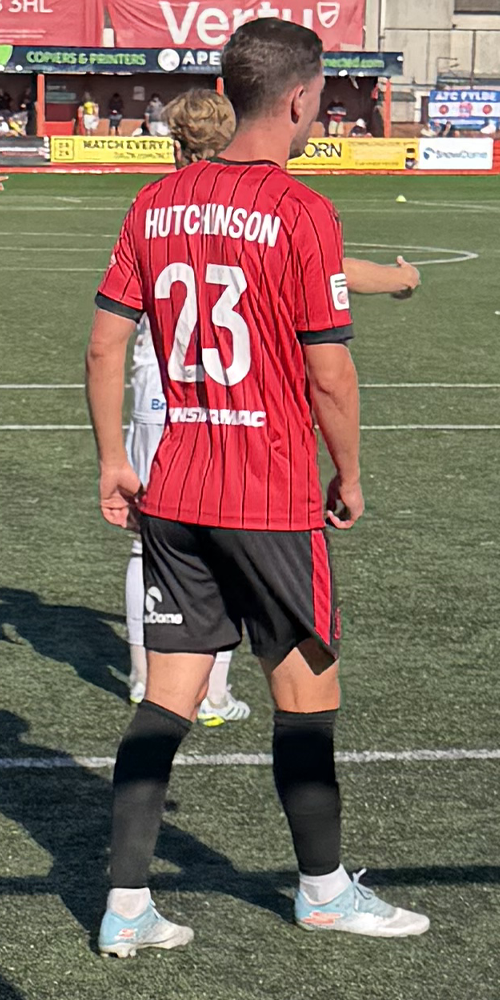
Hutchinson playing for Tamworth in August 2026.

Hutchinson signed for National League side Tamworth on 27 June 2026. On 8 August 2026, Jake made his debut for Tamworth, on the opening day of the 2026–27 season, coming on as a 78th minute substitute for Nathan Tshikuna in a 3–3 draw away at Boreham Wood. Hutchinson scored his first two goals for Tamworth in a National League Cup fixture at home to Newcastle United on 18 August 2026, scoring 19th and 31st minutes as Tamworth won the fixture 5–3. Hutchinson scored his first National League goal for Tamworth on 31 August 2026, scoring a 31st minute equalising goal in a match Tamworth eventually lost 3–2 away against Yeovil Town.

== Personal life ==
His brother is Isaac Hutchinson, who is also a professional footballer currently playing for EFL League One side Doncaster Rovers.

== Career statistics ==
As of 9 September 2026

Appearances and goals by club, season and competition
Club	Season	League			National Cup		League Cup		Other		Total	
Club	Season	Division	Apps	Goals	Apps	Goals	Apps	Goals	Apps	Goals	Apps	Goals
Queen of the South	2023–24	League One	13	1	2	0	0	0	2 (Note: Two appearances in Scottish Challenge Cup)	0	17	1
Eastbourne Borough (loan)	2023–24	National League South	11	0	0	0	—		0	0	11	0
Worthing	2024–25	National League South	6	0	1	0	—		0	0	7	0
Enfield Town	2024–25	National League South	26	3	0	0	—		3 (Note: One appearance in Middlesex Senior Cup and two appearances and one goal in FA Trophy)	1	29	4
Hitchin Town (loan)	2024–25	Southern League Premier Division Central	8	2	0	0	—		0	0	8	2
Folkestone Invicta	2025–26	Isthmian League Premier Division	42	24	0	0	—		0	0	42	24
Tamworth	2026–27	National League	5	1	0	0	—		2 (Note: Two appearances and two goals in National League Cup)	2	7	3
Career total			111	31	2	0	0	0	7	3	121	34
