= Elite Player Performance Plan =

Youth development scheme in English football

The Elite Player Performance Plan (EPPP) is a youth development scheme initiated by the Premier League. The intention of the EPPP is to improve the quality and quantity of home-grown players produced by top English clubs. Measures introduced by the EPPP to free up movement of younger players by establishing a hierarchy of association football academies in England and fixing the transfer fees between academies have proved controversial and some smaller clubs closed their academies in response to the changes.

== Support ==
The EPPP was accepted by the 72 member clubs of the Football League on 20 October 2011. The clubs voted 46 in favour and 22 against, with three no-shows and one abstention.

== Principles and focus ==
The Premier League published the following list of principles upon which the EPPP was designed after its ratification by the members of the Football League:

- Increase the number and quality of home-grown players gaining professional contracts in the clubs and playing first-team football at the highest level
- Create more time for players to play and be coached
- Improve coaching provision
- Implement a system of effective measurement and quality assurance
- Positively influence strategic investment into the Academy System, demonstrating value for money
- Seek to implement significant gains in every aspect of player development

The plan aims to improve youth development by focusing on the following:

- Allowing clubs to have more coaching time with their young players
- Helping clubs foster links with local schools in order to help young players get the best out of their football education as well as the academic side
- Allowing clubs that have earned a top category grading to recruit young talent from further afield than is permitted under the current rules
- Working with the Football League to review the current system used for determining compensation

The plan proposes the modernisation of talent identification and recruitment including research in such areas as physiological parameters, relative age effects, psychological profiling, motivation, decision making, technical ability and attrition rates.

== Changes from previous academy system ==
The principal changes from the former academy system are:

Abolition of the "90-minute" rule – Academies were only allowed to sign players aged under 18 if they resided within 90 minutes' travel time of the training facility. This has historically provided each club with a "catchment area". There were some exceptions to the rule to provide for players living in remote areas. Larger clubs were prevented from taking youth players away from home at a young age for training.

A four-tier academy system – It is proposed that there will be four gradings of academies, with the highest rated academies being able to sign the best players and command the largest fees. Category 1 academies will have high contact time with young players, require a minimum of 18 full-time staff and an operational budget of £2.5m. Academies will be reviewed every two years and re-categorised if necessary. Categorisation is the result of an independent audit.

A fixed tariff for transfers of players under 18 – The proposed tariff is:

| Years spent at academy | Fixed fee per year |
|---|---|
| aged 9–11 | £3,000 |
| aged 12–16 | £12,500 – £40,000 depending on academy category |

This will replace the current system of compensation determined by an independent tribunal. Thus, a 14-year-old player who spends 6 years at the club (Category 3) will command an initial fee of £46,500 (£3,000 × 3 + £12,500 × 3). Further fixed fees are payable on the player making first team appearances in any professional senior competition:

| Appearances | Premier League | Championship | League One | League Two |
|---|---|---|---|---|
| 10 | £150,000 | £25,000 | £10,000 | £5,000 |
| 20 | £300,000 | £50,000 | £20,000 | £10,000 |
| 30 | £450,000 | £75,000 | £30,000 | £15,000 |
| 40 | £600,000 | £100,000 | £40,000 | £20,000 |
| 50 | £750,000 | £125,000 | £50,000 | £25,000 |
| 60 | £900,000 | £150,000 | £60,000 | £30,000 |
| 70 | £1,000,000 | £175,000 | £70,000 | £35,000 |
| 80 | £1,100,000 | £200,000 | £80,000 | £40,000 |
| 90 | £1,200,000 | £225,000 | £90,000 | £45,000 |
| 100 | £1,300,000 | £250,000 | £100,000 | £50,000 |

=== Youth league system ===
The old youth league system will be abolished and replaced by the Professional Development League. Clubs with high-category academies will compete against others of the same standard in the top tier and so on. A number of clubs have made their applications for academy status public, including Fulham, Manchester City, Southampton, Stoke City, Sunderland, and West Ham United.

== Controversy ==
The EPPP has been greeted with scepticism from parts of the English Football League. Some claim the Premier League has blackmailed the Football League by threatening to remove all youth development funding if the Football League did not accept the new deal. It has been described by some as a way of catering for only the elite. The new rules mean that a Category 1 academy can go to any other training ground to watch a player (giving 48 hours' notice) and effectively buy the player for a fixed fee starting from £3,000.

Hereford United, Wycombe Wanderers and Yeovil Town folded their academies at the start of the 2012–13 season, stating that the cost of implementing the EPPP was part of the reason for this. Brentford closed their academy at the end of the 2015–16 season, citing the EPPP as a reason for the closure. Bolton also downgraded their academy in 2015 in order to save money. They downgraded it again in 2020. Salford City scrapped their academy before the start of the 2020–2021 season. On 7 December 2020, Birmingham City announced they would be replacing their development squad with a "B" team and their academy with a "C" team.
