= Sean O'Brien (footballer) =

English footballer (born 2001)

Personal information
- Date of birth: 13 October 2001 (age 25)
- Height: 1.80 m (5 ft 11 in)
- Positions: Attacking midfielder; striker

Team information
- Current team: Westfield

Youth career
- Millwall

Senior career*
Years	Team	Apps	(Gls)
2021–2022	Millwall	0	(0)
2021	→ Bromley (loan)	1	(0)
2022–2023	Forest Green Rovers	10	(0)
2022	→ Gloucester City (loan)	2	(0)
2023	Hayes & Yeading United	4	(1)
2023–2024	Carshalton Athletic	13	(0)
2025–2026	Kingstonian	47	(14)
2026–	Westfield	0	(0)
- * Club domestic league appearances and goals as of 12:23, 3 November 2026 (UTC)

Sean O'Brien (born 13 October 2001) is an English professional footballer who plays as an attacking midfielder and striker for Isthmian League South Central Division club Westfield.

== Career ==
O'Brien came through the youth system at Millwall and spent time on loan with Bromley in August 2021. Following his departure from Millwall, he signed for Forest Green Rovers in September 2022. He later joined Gloucester City on loan in November 2022.

Forest Green released O'Brien at the conclusion of the 2022–23 season.

In May 2025, he signed for Isthmian League South Central Division club Kingstonian.

On 3 November 2026, O'Brien agreed to join fellow Isthmian League South Central Division side Westfield.

== Style of play ==
O'Brien has been described by the BBC as a "versatile forward" who can play "as a central striker or attacking midfielder".

== Career statistics ==
As of match played 31 October 2026

Appearances and goals by club, season and competition
Club	Season	League			FA Cup		EFL Cup		Other		Total	
Club	Season	Division	Apps	Goals	Apps	Goals	Apps	Goals	Apps	Goals	Apps	Goals
Millwall	2021–22	Championship	0	0	0	0	0	0	—		0	0
Bromley (loan)	2021–22	National League	1	0	0	0	—		0	0	1	0
Forest Green Rovers	2022–23	League One	10	0	0	0	0	0	2 (Note: Appearances in the EFL Trophy)	0	12	0
Gloucester City (loan)	2022–23	National League North	2	0	—		—		1 (Note: Appearance in the FA Trophy)	0	3	0
Hayes & Yeading United	2023–24	Southern League Premier Division South	4	1	2	0	—		0	0	6	1
Carshalton Athletic	2023–24	Isthmian League Premier Division	13	0	—		—		—		13	0
Kingstonian	2025–26	Isthmian League South Central Division	37	12	1	0	—		3 (Note: One appearance and one goal in the FA Trophy, two appearances and one goal in the Alan Turvey Trophy)	2	41	14
Kingstonian	2026–27	Isthmian League South Central Division	10	2	4	0	—		3 (Note: One appearance and one goal in the FA Trophy, two appearances and one goal in the Alan Turvey Trophy)	2	17	4
Kingstonian	Total		47	14	5	0	—		6	4	58	18
Westfield	2026–27	Isthmian League South Central Division	0	0	—		—		0	0	0	0
Career total			77	15	7	0	0	0	9	4	93	19
