= Birmingham City F.C. Reserves and Academy =

English football reserve team and youth development system

Birmingham City F.C. Development Squad and Academy are the reserve team and the youth development system of Birmingham City Football Club. The reserve team, established in 1879, played in the Premier Reserve League South in the 2009–10 season, but did not enter a league again until the 2012–13 season, when it was placed in the northern division of the newly formed Professional Development League 2, a predominantly under-21 league. The academy, established in its current form in 1999, trains boys in age groups from under 9s through to under 18s.

== Reserves ==
Birmingham City have had a reserve team since 1879. They played friendly matches until gaining a place in the Birmingham & District League in 1893. In their third season they finished in runners-up spot, an achievement repeated in 1907 and 1921. In 1915 they were runaway winners of the league; in the 34-game season they scored 160 goals, of which Charlie Duncan scored 52. In 1921–22, following the reorganisation associated with the formation of the Third Division North, they joined the Central League, which now consisted of reserve teams of northern Football League clubs. In 1947–48 they lost their place to Barnsley, so joined the Football Combination, the equivalent reserve league for teams in the southern half of the country, rejoining an expanded Central League in 1982.

Since the 1999–2000 season, the league played in by the reserve team has depended on the league position of the club's first team. Relegation for the first team in 2006 meant the reserves dropped out of the Premier Reserve League into the Central League for 2006–07; they finished top of the Central Division of that League. Promotion back to the Premier League for the first team meant that for 2007–08 the reserves were placed in the Southern Division of the Premier Reserve League. Birmingham City fields its reserve team in the Birmingham Senior Cup, which it has won on twelve occasions, most recently in 2008 after a 5–0 win over Burton Albion.

Following the first team's relegation from the Premier League at the end of the 2007–08 season, the reserve team was no longer eligible to play in the Premier Reserve League. The option to enter the Central League was not taken up, the club deciding instead not to enter the reserves in a league, but to play only friendly matches and the Birmingham Senior Cup. When the first team gained promotion back to the Premier League the following year, the reserve team resumed its place in the Premier Reserve League South, in which they finished seventh of nine. They did not enter a league until the 2012–13 season, when they were placed in the northern division of the Professional Development League 2, the second tier of the newly formed Professional Development League, a predominantly under-21 league resulting from the Premier League's Elite Player Performance Plan.

The reserve team's playing staff consists of younger players and those on the fringe of the first-team squad, augmented by first-team players recovering from injury and academy players gaining experience. They played most of their league matches at Damson Park, the home ground of Solihull Moors; they sometimes played at St Andrew's, for instance when an unusually high attendance is expected. Friendlies are often played behind closed doors at the club's training ground.

On 7 December 2020 Birmingham announced they'd be replacing their Development Squad with a B Team.

== Academy ==
In 1996, the directors of Birmingham City dismantled their youth development system in the belief, according to manager Barry Fry, that the Bosman ruling meant "they may invest a substantial sum in producing a player who was then picked off, without cost, by a rival club", and the £250,000 annual saving would be better spent bringing in players from outside. Fry's successor as manager, Trevor Francis, insisted that the system should be reinstated and brought in Brian Eastick to oversee the process; by 1999 the club had met the Football Association's criteria and received a licence to operate an academy.

Since the youth system was re-established, a number of players have graduated to careers in League football at Birmingham or elsewhere, some examples being Darren Carter, Craig Fagan, Andrew Johnson, Marcos Painter, Mat Sadler and Jude Bellingham. Academy products who have represented their country include Colin Doyle (Republic of Ireland), David Howland (Northern Ireland U-21), Sone Aluko (England U-19), Krystian Pearce (2007 FIFA U-17 World Cup with England U-17), and Aaron Moses-Garvey, whose St Kitts and Nevis U-20 side reached the final qualifying round for the 2007 FIFA U-20 World Cup and who made his full international debut in February 2008. In the 2009–10 season, goalkeeper Jack Butland was part of the England under-17 team that won the 2010 European championships, and Will Packwood played for the USA at the 2009 FIFA U-17 World Cup.

Terry Westley was appointed Academy manager in 2006. In his first season, he presided over the under-18 side reaching the quarter final of the FA Youth Cup, and two years later they reached the semifinal of the same competition. After completing a report to the club's board of directors, which contained recommendations needed to "push [the Academy] to the next level", Westley left the club by mutual consent in February 2011. He was succeeded by his assistant Kristjaan Speakman.

Under the Premier League's Elite Player Performance Plan, Birmingham's Academy was assessed as category 2 (of 4)

The academy teams play their matches at the club's training ground, Wast Hills, at Kings Norton, south Birmingham.

On 7 December 2020 Birmingham announced they'd be replacing their Academy with a C Team.

== Players ==
=== Current U21s squad ===
As of 1 September 2025

Note: Flags indicate national team as defined under FIFA eligibility rules; some limited exceptions apply. Players may hold more than one non-FIFA nationality.

No.	Pos.	Nation	Player
48	GK	ENG	Bradley Mayo
—	GK	ENG	William O'Sullivan
—	GK	ENG	Tyrese Warmington
—	DF	NIR	Tom Fogarty
—	DF	ENG	Byron Pendleton
—	DF	ENG	Jack Quirk
45	DF	IRL	Billy Burrell
—	DF	WAL	Zach Willis
—	DF	BEL	Godfred Boakye
—	DF	ENG	Caleb Sanders
40	DF	ZIM	Menzi Mazwi
—	MF	ENG	Trae Briscoe
—	MF	ENG	Alezandro Da Silva
—	MF	JAM	Cameron Eubank
—	MF	JAM	O'Shea Ellis
—	MF	ENG	Cody Pennington
47	MF	ENG	George Wynne
43	FW	ALG	Zaid Betteka
—	FW	ENG	Yusuf Ahmed
—	FW	CUB	Álvaro Ruiz Rente
42	FW	IRL	Daniel Isichei
39	FW	ENG	Briar Bateman
—	FW	ENG	Ben Wodskou
—	FW	ENG	Frank Tattum

=== Current Academy squad ===
As of 1 July 2025

Note: Flags indicate national team as defined under FIFA eligibility rules; some limited exceptions apply. Players may hold more than one non-FIFA nationality.

No.	Pos.	Nation	Player
—	GK	ENG	Alfie Smith
—	GK	ENG	Shea Birmingham
—	GK	ENG	Szymon Terenowicz
—	DF	GAM	Isifu Jawara
—	DF	ENG	Blake Campbell
—	DF	ENG	Henry Pearsall
—	DF	ENG	Liam Brannigan
—	DF	ENG	Dylan Okpapi
—	DF	ENG	Salif Bamba
—	DF	ENG	Riquelme Thompson-Jones
—	MF	ENG	Joe Ralph
—	MF	ENG	Noah Hoarau
—	MF	ENG	Lorenzo Greer
—	MF	ENG	Louie Rea
—	MF	ENG	Taha Elmansuri
—	FW	ENG	Aurelien Guernier
—	FW	ENG	Kaidon Robinson
—	FW	ENG	Connor Reilly
—	FW	ENG	Nikolai Degtiarev
—	FW	ENG	Tobi Ugorji
—	FW	ENG	Kian McCusker

== Club officials ==
As of 14 January 2021

Coaching staff

- Academy Technical Director: Mike Rigg
- Academy Manager: Louisa Collis
- Head of Coaching: Mike Scott
- Under-21s head coach: Scott Sellars
- Academy U18 coach: Martyn Olorenshaw
- Academy U18 coach: Marcos Pianter
- Academy Development Coach: Andy Crabtree
