= Derby County F.C. Development Squad and Academy =

Derby County U21s & U18s
- Nickname: The Rams
- Ground: Pride Park Stadium, Moor Farm Training Centre, Loughborough University Stadium
- Owner: Clowes Developments (UK) Limited
- Manager: Danny Maye (U21); Bradley Johnson (U18)
- League: Premier League 2

Derby County Reserves and Academy are the youth teams of Derby County. The reserve team is made up of under-23 players, and is effectively Derby County's second-string side. The under-18 players among other younger age groups make up the academy team. They play in the Premier League 2, the highest tier of reserve team football in England. Derby's academy is Category 1, the highest classification in England under the Elite Player Performance Plan.

== Under-21 squad ==
As of 4 September 2026

Note: Flags indicate national team as defined under FIFA eligibility rules; some limited exceptions apply. Players may hold more than one non-FIFA nationality.

No.	Pos.	Nation	Player
—	GK	SCO	Alfie Halliwell
—	GK	ENG	Harley Price
—	GK	SCO	Sam Kane
—	DF	ENG	Luke Banks
—	DF	ENG	Rio Canoville
—	DF	ENG	Braidy Connell-Webster
—	DF	NIR	Alfie Friars
—	DF	ENG	Tristan Gill
—	DF	ENG	Isaac Gordon
—	DF	ENG	Khace Gordon
42	DF	IRL	Raymond Offor
—	DF	ENG	Adisa Osayande
—	DF	ENG	Keilen Robinson
—	DF	IRL	Freddie Turley (on loan at Dunfermline Athletic)

No.	Pos.	Nation	Player
40	MF	WAL	Cruz Allen (on loan at FC Halifax Town)
—	MF	MGL	Dantel Hodges
—	MF	IRL	Niall McAndrew
—	MF	SKN	Marley Mintus
—	MF	ENG	Jerome Richards
—	MF	ENG	Marcelo Tola
—	FW	ENG	Jaydan Davidson
—	FW	NIR	Sean Corry
—	FW	ENG	Charles Ebuka Agbawodikeizu
—	FW	ENG	Israel Green
—	FW	ENG	Johnson Osong
—	FW	ENG	Justin Oguntolu
—	FW	SCO	Cameron Wilson

== Under-18 squad ==
As of 4 September

Note: Flags indicate national team as defined under FIFA eligibility rules; some limited exceptions apply. Players may hold more than one non-FIFA nationality.

No.	Pos.	Nation	Player
—	GK	POL	Cristiano Dzialuk
—	DF	SKN	Luca Crolla
—	DF	ENG	Tom Marriott
—	DF	ENG	George Stokes
—	DF	ENG	Darnell Thomas
—	MF	ENG	Kieran Clarke

No.	Pos.	Nation	Player
—	MF	GIB	Kacey Myers
—	FW	ENG	Zayne Blake
—	FW	ENG	Kacey Gill
—	FW	ENG	Euan Griffiths
—	FW	ENG	Charlie Smith

== Honours ==
=== Reserves/U21 team ===
- The Central League
  - Champions: 1935–36, 1971–72, 1985–86, 2024–25
- Premier Reserve League
  - Southern Champions: 1999–2000, 2000–01
- Premier League 2
  - Division 2 Champions: 2015–16
- Derbyshire Senior Cup
  - Champions: 1891–92, 1951–52, 2010–11

=== Academy team ===
- U18 Premier League
  - National Champions: 2018–19
  - Northern Champions: 2018–19
