= Sheffield United F.C. Academy =

- Full name: Sheffield United Football Club Youth Academy
- Nicknames: The Blades, Red & White Wizards
- Ground: Shirecliffe Ground; Firshill Crescent; Sheffield; S4 7DW
- Manager: Derek Geary
- League: Professional Development League 2
Home colours	Away colours

Sheffield United Football Club Youth Academy are the youth team of Sheffield United. The Under-18 and Under-23 teams play in Professional Development League 2.

The academy is currently run by Jack Lester while Derek Geary coaches the U18s side. Sheffield United's youth system was given Academy status in December 2002. In July 2017 the academy was recognised, in a study conducted by Press Association Sport, for having the 7th best academy for minutes played in the 2016–17 Premier League. In between Arsenal and Chelsea they placed by far the highest for a club outside the top-flight.

The team plays at the Shirecliffe Ground at Firshill Crescent.

== Current squad ==
Updated 10 July 2026

Note: Flags indicate national team as defined under FIFA eligibility rules; some limited exceptions apply. Players may hold more than one non-FIFA nationality.

No.	Pos.	Nation	Player
31	GK	ENG	Luke Faxon
46	GK	ENG	Henry Molyneux
43	DF	ENG	Harry Boyes
—	DF	ENG	Jili Buyabu
26	DF	ENG	Jamal Baptiste
53	DF	ENG	Sam Colechin
47	DF	SCO	Evan Easton
—	DF	ENG	Mehki Haughton-Parris
—	DF	ENG	Jayden Prunty
—	DF	ENG	Ben Purches
45	DF	ENG	Sai Sachdev
37	DF	LTU	Dovydas Sasnauskas

No.	Pos.	Nation	Player
—	DF	ENG	Jack Waldron
48	MF	ENG	Sam Aston
41	MF	ENG	Billy Blacker
50	MF	ENG	Ethan Cummings
49	MF	ENG	Jay Tinsdale
—	FW	ENG	Kurtis Havenhand
54	FW	ENG	Marshall Francis
39	FW	SCO	Ryan Oné
—	FW	ERI	Siem Eyob-Abraha

=== Out on loan ===
Note: Flags indicate national team as defined under FIFA eligibility rules; some limited exceptions apply. Players may hold more than one non-FIFA nationality.

No.	Pos.	Nation	Player
—	DF	JAM	Miguel Freckleton (on loan at Swindon Town)
—	FW	ENG	Antwoine Hackford (on loan at Port Vale)

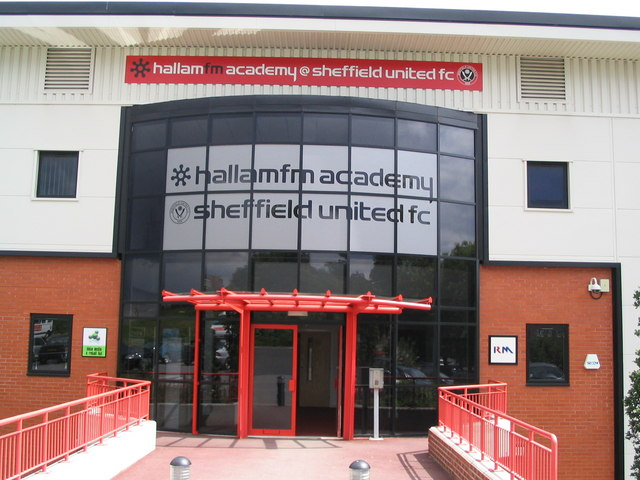
The Sheffield United F.C. Academy & Training ground at Shirecliffe

== List of Academy managers ==
Name	Nationality	From	To	Notes
John Warnock and Ron Reid	England			
John Pemberton	England	23 March 2010	7 September 2012	
Jamie Hoyland	England	25 September 2012	5 December 2012	
Nick Cox	England	1 January 2013	12 May 2016	
Travis Binnion	(Republic of Ireland) Ireland	1 July 2016	19 July 2019	
Jack Lester	England	19 July 2019	25 November 2021	
Derek Geary	(Republic of Ireland) Ireland	11 January 2022		

== Notable Academy Graduates ==
The academy has produced England internationals such as Phil Jagielka, Kyle Walker and Harry Maguire as well as many players who have gone on to have careers in professional football, whether at Sheffield United or at other clubs. Current Sheffield United players are highlighted in green.

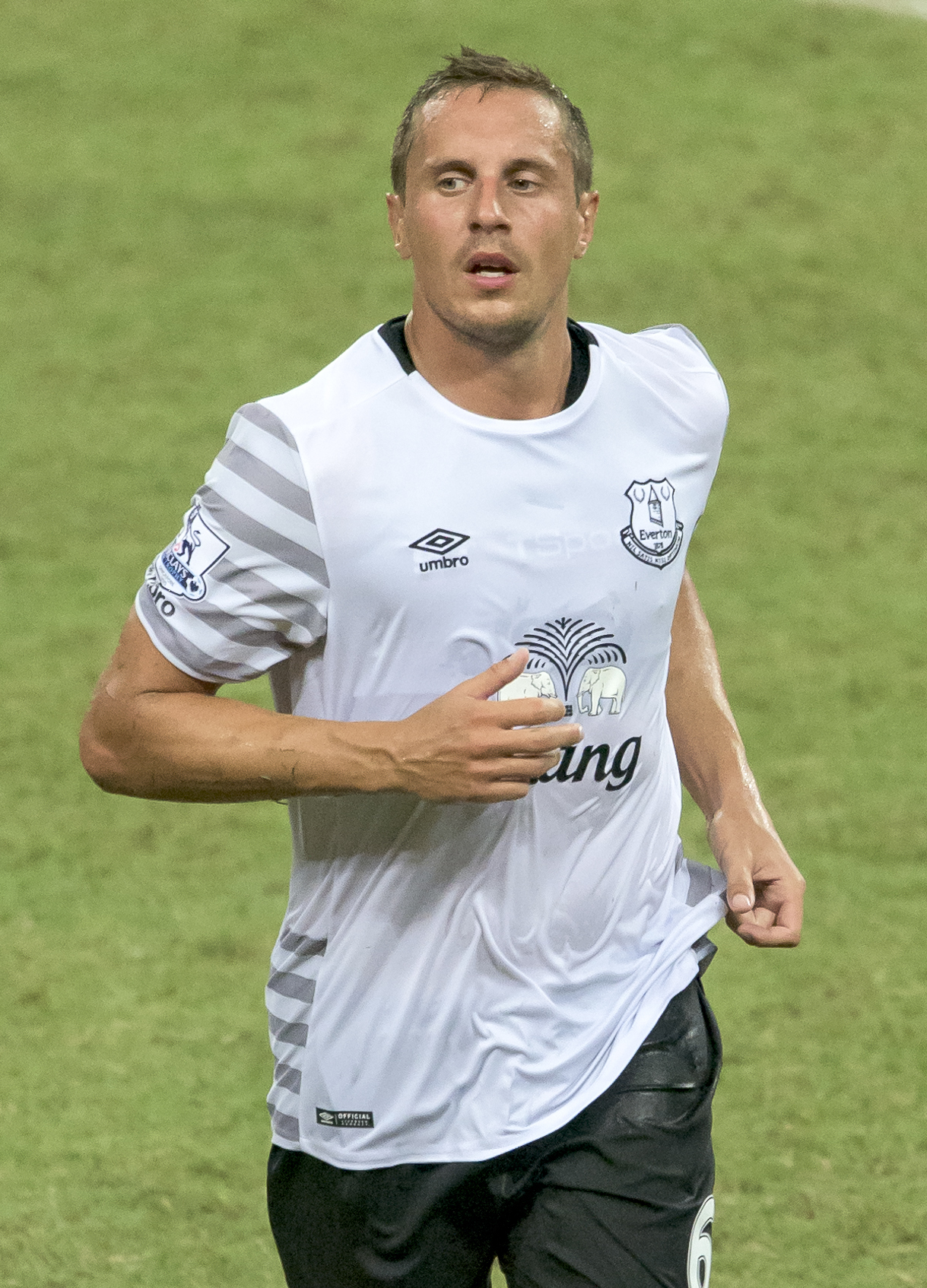
England International Phil Jagielka made over 250 appearances for United.

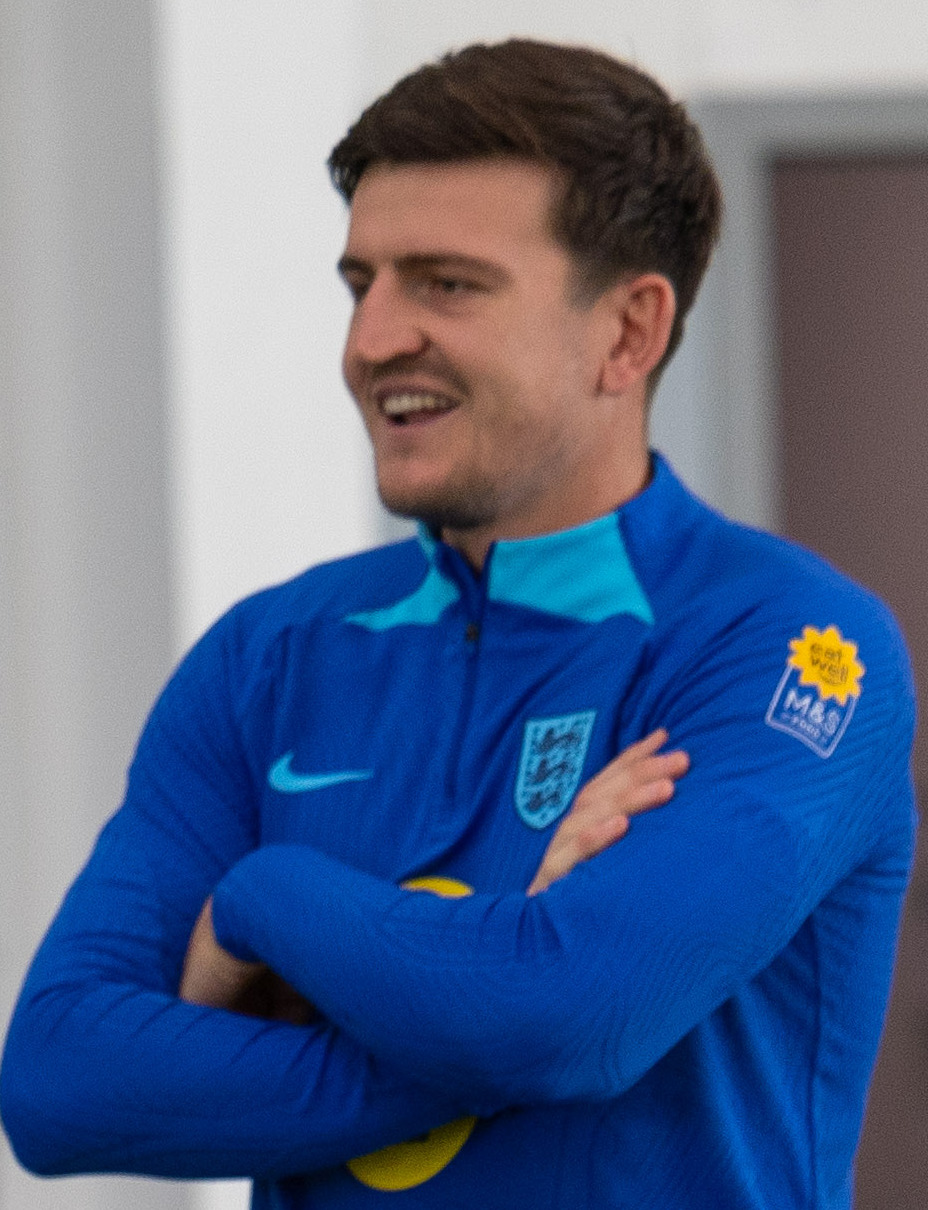
Defender Harry Maguire made over 150 appearances for his boyhood club.

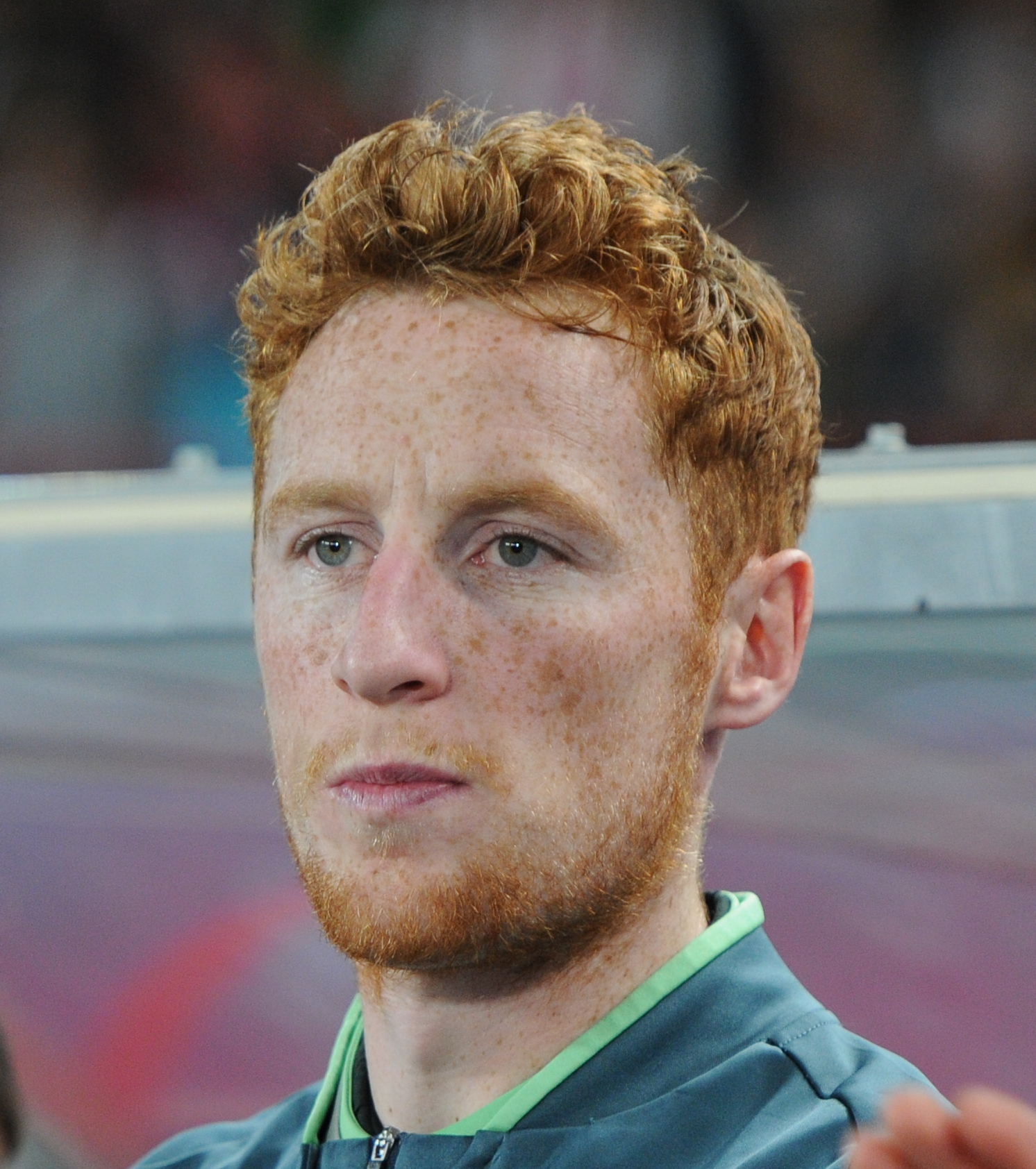
Irish midfielder Stephen Quinn made over 250 appearances for United.

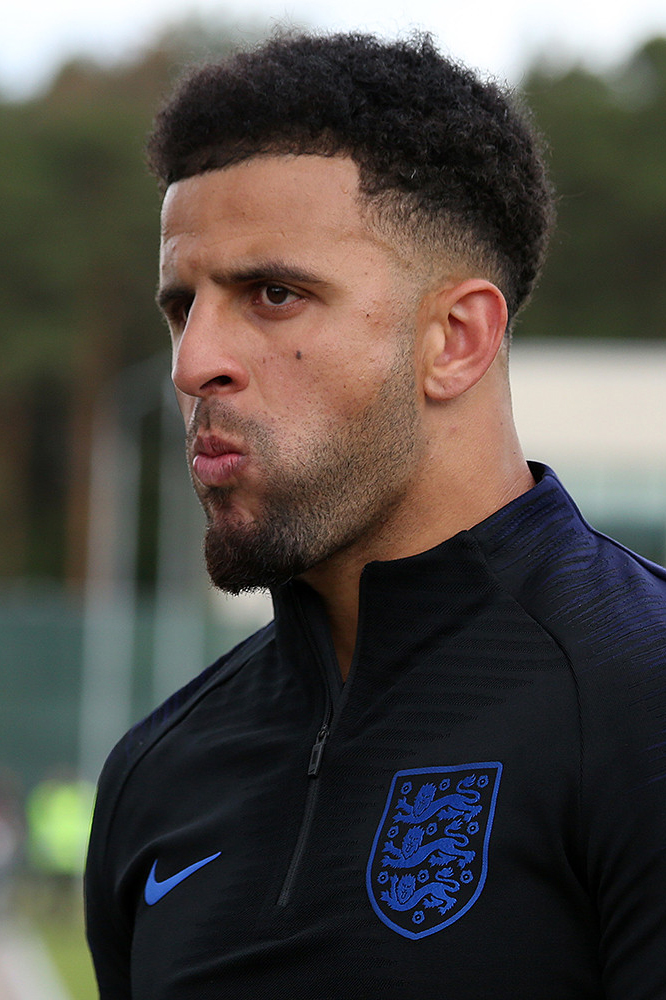
Kyle Walker has played for the England national team.

Player	Current Club	Born	International Honours	Notes
(Somaliland) Liban Abdi	Retired	(Somaliland) Burao		
(England) Micky Adams	Retired	(England) Sheffield	England Youth	Former Manager
(England) Frank Barlow	Retired	(England) Mexborough		Former Assistant Manager
(Republic of Ireland) Aaron Barry	(Republic of Ireland) Bray Wanderers	(Republic of Ireland) Dublin		
(England) Alan Birchenall	Retired	(England) East Ham	England under-23	
(Wales) David Brooks	(England) Bournemouth	(England) Warrington	Full Wales call-up	
(England) Scott Boden	(England) Boreham Wood	(England) Sheffield		
(England) Dominic Calvert-Lewin	(England) Everton	(England) Sheffield	Full England cap	
(Northern Ireland) Adam Chapman	(England) Gainsborough Trinity	(England) Doncaster	Northern Ireland under-21	
(England) Ryan Cresswell	Retired	(England) Rotherham		
(England) Kevin Davies	Retired	(England) Sheffield	Full England Cap	
(Republic of Ireland) Connor Dimaio	(England) Boston United	(England) Chesterfield	Ireland under-21	
(Italy) Diego De Girolamo	(England) Buxton	(England) Chesterfield	Italy under-19	
(Northern Ireland) Martin Donnelly	(Northern Ireland) Linfield	(Northern Ireland) Belfast	Full Northern Ireland Cap	
(Barbados) Jonathan Forte	Retired	(England) Sheffield	Full Barbados Caps	
(England) Alan Hodgkinson	Retired	(England) Laughton-en-le-Morthen	Full England Caps	
(England) Evan Horwood	(England) West Auckland Town	(England) Billingham		
(England) Kevan Hurst	(England) Guiseley	(England) Chesterfield		
(England) Phil Jagielka	Retired	(England) Sale	Full England Caps	
(England) Mick Jones	Retired	(England) Worksop	Full England Caps	
(Pakistan) Otis Khan	(England) Walsall	(England) Ashton-under-Lyne	Full Pakistan Caps	
(England) Nicky Law	(United States) Indy Eleven	(England) Nottingham		
(England) George Long	(England) Millwall	(England) Sheffield	England under-20	
(England) Matthew Lowton	(England) Burnley	(England) Chesterfield		
(England) Harry Maguire	(England) Manchester United	(England) Sheffield	Full England caps	World Record Transfer Fee for a Central Defender
(Scotland) Callum McFadzean	(England) Wrexham	(England) Sheffield	Scotland under-21	
(England) Kyle McFadzean	(England) Blackburn Rovers	(England) Sheffield	England C	
(England) Jacob Mellis	(England) Southend United	(England) Nottingham	England under-19	
(Scotland) Nick Montgomery	Retired	(England) Leeds	Scotland Futures	
(England) Kyle Naughton	(Wales) Swansea City	(England) Sheffield	England under-21	
(England) George Oghani	Retired	(England) Manchester		
(Northern Ireland) David Parkhouse	(Northern Ireland) Ballymena United	(Northern Ireland) Strabane	Northern Ireland under-21	
(England) Tony Philliskirk	Retired	(England) Sunderland		
(England) Ben Purkiss	Retired	(England) Sheffield		
(Republic of Ireland) Stephen Quinn	(England) Mansfield Town	(Republic of Ireland) Dublin	Full Ireland Caps	
(England) Wayne Quinn	Retired	(England) Truro		
(England) Aaron Ramsdale	(England) Arsenal	(England) Stoke-on-Trent	Full England Caps	
(England) Louis Reed	(England) Swindon Town	(England) Barnsley	England under-20	
(Scotland) Chris Robertson	(England) Coalville Town	(Scotland) Dundee		
(England) Jordan Slew	(England) FC Halifax Town	(England) Sheffield	England under-19	
(England) Billy Sharp	(England) Hull City	(England) Sheffield		EFL Championship record goalscorer
(England) Graham Shaw	Retired	(England) Sheffield	Full England Caps	Deceased
(Poland) Ben Starosta	(England) Free Agent	(England) Sheffield	Poland under-20	
(Algeria) Aymen Tahar	(Greece) Athlitiki Enosi Larissa	(England) Sheffield	Algeria under-20	
(England) Nicky Travis	Retired	(England) Sheffield		
(England) Michael Tonge	Retired	(England) Manchester	England under-21	
(England) Kyle Walker	(England) Manchester City	(England) Sheffield	Full England Caps	
(England) Sam Wedgbury	(England) Stalybridge Celtic	(England) Oldbury		
(England) Alan Woodward	Retired	(England) Chapeltown		
(England) Dane Whitehouse	Retired	(England) Sheffield		
(England) Elliott Whitehouse	(England) Forest Green Rovers	(England) Worksop		
(England) Ben Whiteman	(England) Preston North End	(England) Rochdale		
(England) Harvey Gilmour	(England) Rochdale	(England) Sheffield		
(England) Tyler Smith	(England) Derry City	(England) Sheffield		

== Honours ==
- Professional U21 Development League 2
  - Champions: 2023–24
- FA Youth Cup
  - Runners-up: 2011
- Professional U18 Development League 2
  - North Division Champions: 2016–17, 2021–22
  - Champions: 2016–17, 2021–22
