= Watford F.C. B Team and Academy =

Coordinates: 51.711870°N 0.279832°W

Watford Football Club B Team and Academy
- Full name: Watford Football Club B Team and Academy
- Nicknames: The Hornets, The Golden Boys, Yellow Army, The 'Orns
- Ground: The UCL Sports Ground, Shenley, Hertfordshire, England
- Owner: Gino Pozzo
- Chairman: Scott Duxbury
- Website: www.watfordfc.com
Home colours	Away colours	Third colours

Watford F.C. B Team and Academy is the youth setup of Watford Football Club. The B Team is effectively Watford's second-string side, but is limited to three outfield players and one goalkeeper over the age of 23 per game following the introduction of new regulations from the 2012–13 season. The Under-18 side is the most senior team in the academy.

Home fixtures are contested at the UCL Sports Ground, based in Bell Lane, Shenley, Hertfordshire.

== Players ==
Players who will qualify for the B Team in season 2026–27 (i.e. born on or after 1 January 2005) and who are outside the first-team squad. Players born after 1 September 2008 qualify for the under-18 team.

Nat.	No.	Pos.	Name	Status	Date of Birth	Contract Exp.	Notes (Note: For loans in non-national English leagues, see 2024–25 Watford F.C. season.)	Ref.
(South Africa)		GK	Roraigh Browne	B Team	12 September 2005 (age 20)	2027	Option 2028	
(Sweden)	55	GK	Jonathan Macaulay	B Team	17 March 2005 (age 21)	2027	Option 2028	
(England)		GK	Sam Morris	B Team	23 October 2006 (age 19)	2027	Option 2028	
(Cyprus)		GK	Gabriel Ortelli	B Team	19 June 2006 (age 20)	2029	Option 2030	
(England)		GK	Sebastian Thrussell	B Team	8 February 2008 (age 18)	2027	Option 2028	
(England)	51	DF	Travis Akomeah	B Team	6 January 2006 (age 20)	2028	Option 2029	
(England)	53	DF	James Clarridge	B Team	8 May 2004 (age 22)	2027	Option 2028	
(England)	56	DF	Albert Eames	B Team	20 September 2005 (age 20)	2027		
(England)		DF	Tom Georgiou	B Team	7 September 2006 (age 20)	2027	Option 2028	
(England)		DF	Conrad Hunt	B Team	19 June 2007 (age 19)	2027	Option 2028	
(England)	50	DF	Josh Mullins	B Team	16 November 2005 (age 20)	2027	Option 2028	
(England)		DF	Ollie Stephenson	B Team	18 September 2006 (age 19)	2027	Option 2028	
(Romania)		DF	Raul Vancea	B Team	19 April 2008 (age 18)	2027	Option 2028	
(England)		MF	Tobi Akinyimika	B Team	1 September 2007 (age 19)	2027	Option 2028	
(Latvia)		MF	Marats Galajevs	B Team	13 December 2007 (age 18)	2027	Option 2028	
(England)	58	MF	Jai-Dea Moulton	B Team	29 January 2008 (age 18)	2027	Option 2028	
(England)	52	MF	Leo Ramirez-Espain	B Team	2 October 2006 (age 19)	2027		
(England)	48	FW	Michael Adu-Poku	B Team	22 September 2005 (age 20)	2027	Option 2029	
(England)		FW	Tony Cowie	B Team	27 October 2007 (age 18)	2027		
(England)	49	FW	Remiero Moulton	B Team	13 June 2006 (age 20)	2028	Option 2029	
(England)		FW	Kash Odiase	B Team	17 April 2007 (age 19)	2027	Option 2028	
(Republic of Ireland)		FW	Nickson Okosun	B Team	21 November 2006 (age 19)	2029	Option 2030	
(England)		FW	Jael Norville	B Team	25 February 2008 (age 18)	2027		
(England)		FW	Kymani Smith-Daley	B Team	20 June 2008 (age 18)	2027	Option 2028	
(England)		FW	Max Smith	B Team	16 June 2007 (age 19)	2027	Option 2028	
(Romania)		GK	Eric Lipetz	Under-18	9 September 2009 (age 16)	2027		
(England)		GK	Finley Murray	Under-18	27 October 2008 (age 17)	2027		
(England)	75	DF	Tomiwa Akinyimika	Under-18	19 July 2009 (age 17)	2027		
(England)		DF	Tyler Clarke	Under-18	9 October 2009 (age 16)	2027		
(England)		DF	Harrison Hudson	Under-18	22 March 2010 (age 16)	2027		
(England)	80	DF	Raphael London	Under-18	25 December 2008 (age 17)	2027		
(England)		DF	Chaniel Ogieva-Okunbor	Under-18	13 March 2009 (age 17)	2027		
(England)		MF	Horatio Ali Sticca	Under-18	24 March 2009 (age 17)	2027		
(England)		MF	Frankie Dalli	Under-18	11 October 2009 (age 16)	2027		
(England)		MF	Gameli Hoedoafia	Under-18	22 October 2009 (age 16)	2027		
(England)		MF	Charlie McLoughlin	Under-18	10 December 2008 (age 17)	2027		
(England)		MF	Asher Neal	Under-18	4 December 2009 (age 16)	2027		
(England)		MF	Rory O'Dwyer	Under-18	9 September 2009 (age 16)	2027		
(England)		MF	Will Ramsey-White	Under-18	2 December 2009 (age 16)	2027		
(England)		MF	Albert Stevens	Under-18	26 April 2009 (age 17)	2027		
(England)		FW	Sonny Fraser	Under-18	30 March 2010 (age 16)	2027		
(England)		FW	Jamael John-Baptiste	Under-18		2027		
(England)		FW	Cayden Lamothe	Under-18	10 August 2009 (age 17)	2027		
(England)		FW	Dino Obiefule	Under-18	14 November 2009 (age 16)	2027		
