= 2014–15 Professional U21 Development League =

The 2014–15 Professional U21 Development League was the third season of the Professional Development League system.

== League 1 ==
Barclays U21 Premier League
- Season: 2014–2015
- Champions: Manchester United U21s (2nd Title); Division 2 Middlesbrough U21s (1st Title)
- Promoted: Middlesbrough U21s; Reading U21s
- Relegated: Fulham U21s; West Ham United U21s
- Matches: 264
- Goals: 781 (2.96 per match)
- Top goalscorer: Overall (England) Ryan Seager Southampton U21s (16 Goals); Division 1 (England) Ryan Seager Southampton U21s (16 Goals); Division 2 (England) Adil Nabi West Bromwich Albion U21s (13 Goals)
- Biggest home win: Derby County U21s 7–1 Stoke City U21s (27 January 2015)
- Biggest away win: West Ham United U21s 0–4 Liverpool U21s (12 September 2014); Aston Villa U21s 1–5 Reading U21s (1 December 2014); Brighton & Hove Albion U21s 0–4 Arsenal U21s (1 December 2014); Southampton U21s 0–4 Manchester City EDS (19 May 2015)
- Highest scoring: Leicester City U21s 6–2 Manchester City EDS (27 October 2014); Derby County U21s 7–1 Stoke City U21s (27 January 2015); Chelsea U21s 5–3 Southampton U21s (2 February 2015); Liverpool U21s 4–4 Norwich City U21s (11 May 2015)
- Longest winning run: 7 Matches Reading U21s
- Longest unbeaten run: 10 Matches Manchester United U21s
- Longest winless run: 17 Matches Wolverhampton Wanderers U21s
- Longest losing run: 7 Matches Blackburn Rovers U21s
- Highest attendance: 16,708 Manchester United U21s 4–0 Manchester City EDS (12 May 2015)
- Lowest attendance: 34 Reading U21s 1–0 Brighton & Hove Albion U21s (7 April 2015)

League 1, referred to as the Barclays Under 21 Premier League for sponsorship reasons, was split into two divisions, with teams allocated places in Division 1 or 2 based on their performance in the 2013–14 season.

At the end of the season, the team which finished top of Division 1 was crowned as overall League 1 champions, with the previously used knock-out system being abandoned. The top 8 teams qualified for the 2015–16 edition of the Premier League International Cup and the bottom two teams in Division 1 were relegated to Division 2 for the 2015–16 season, with the top teams in Division 2 moved in the opposite direction.

=== Division 1 ===
==== Table ====
Pos	Team	Pld	W	D	L	GF	GA	GD	Pts	Qualification or relegation
1	Manchester United U21s (C)	22	11	7	4	39	23	+16	40	
2	Liverpool U21s	22	11	3	8	45	35	+10	36	
3	Chelsea U21s	22	10	5	7	39	27	+12	35	
4	Sunderland U21s	22	10	5	7	26	24	+2	35	
5	Manchester City EDS	22	10	3	9	44	40	+4	33	
6	Leicester City U21s	22	9	5	8	39	37	+2	32	
7	Norwich City U21s	22	8	8	6	34	32	+2	32	
8	Southampton U21s	22	9	4	9	32	34	−2	31	
9	Tottenham Hotspur U21s	22	8	5	9	30	30	0	29	
10	Everton U21s	22	8	3	11	32	37	−5	27	
11	Fulham U21s (R)	22	6	4	12	27	45	−18	22	Relegation to 2015–16 U21 Premier League Division 2
12	West Ham United U21s (R)	22	5	2	15	20	43	−23	17	Relegation to 2015–16 U21 Premier League Division 2

(C) Champions; (R) Relegated

==== Results ====
Home \ Away	CHE	EVE	FUL	LEI	LIV	MNC	MNU	NOR	SOT	SUN	TOT	WHU
Chelsea U21s		3–0	2–2	0–1	4–3	2–1	1–1	3–1	5–3	3–0	0–0	0–1
Everton U21s	0–2		3–3	3–2	1–3	1–2	1–2	3–0	3–1	3–2	3–1	2–0
Fulham U21s	1–3	2–1		1–3	3–2	0–2	1–4	2–1	1–2	0–2	0–2	1–1
Leicester City U21s	1–1	1–0	0–2		3–1	6–2	1–1	2–2	3–3	4–2	3–1	3–1
Liverpool U21s	2–0	2–1	1–2	2–1		3–4	1–1	4–4	1–3	1–0	2–1	5–0
Manchester City EDS	3–2	3–1	3–1	4–2	1–2		3–1	4–1	0–2	1–1	3–3	1–1
Manchester United U21s	2–1	0–0	1–2	2–3	2–1	4–0		3–0	1–0	4–0	1–1	3–2
Norwich City U21s	2–2	1–1	3–1	5–0	1–1	2–1	1–1		2–0	0–0	3–1	1–0
Southampton U21s	0–2	1–3	1–1	2–0	2–0	0–4	1–0	2–0		1–1	0–0	2–0
Sunderland U21s	1–0	1–0	4–0	1–0	0–1	1–0	1–1	0–0	3–2		2–1	3–0
Tottenham Hotspur U21s	2–1	4–0	2–0	0–0	1–3	2–1	1–2	0–2	3–2	0–1		2–1
West Ham United U21s	1–3	1–2	2–1	1–0	0–4	2–1	1–2	1–2	1–2	2–0	1–3	

Updated to match(es) played on 23 May 2015. Source: U21 Premier League results
Legend: Blue = home team win; Yellow = draw; Red = away team win.

=== Division 2 ===
==== Table ====
Pos	Team	Pld	W	D	L	GF	GA	GD	Pts	Promotion
1	Middlesbrough U21s (P)	22	16	2	4	39	23	+16	50	Promotion to 2015–16 U21 Premier League Division 1
2	Reading U21s (P)	22	13	2	7	38	30	+8	41	Promotion to 2015–16 U21 Premier League Division 1
3	Derby County U21s	22	12	4	6	39	20	+19	40	
4	Arsenal U21s	22	11	4	7	38	25	+13	37	
5	West Bromwich Albion U21s	22	10	7	5	37	27	+10	37	
6	Newcastle United U21s	22	9	5	8	43	39	+4	32	
7	Aston Villa U21s	22	8	3	11	25	36	−11	27	
8	Brighton & Hove Albion U21s	22	6	5	11	19	23	−4	23	
9	Bolton Wanderers U21s	22	5	8	9	26	33	−7	23	
10	Blackburn Rovers U21s	22	5	6	11	23	31	−8	21	
11	Stoke City U21s	22	4	6	12	23	50	−27	18	
12	Wolverhampton Wanderers U21s	22	3	8	11	24	37	−13	17	

(P) Promoted

==== Results ====
Home \ Away	ARS	AST	BLB	BOL	B&HA	DER	MID	NEW	REA	STO	WBA	WOL
Arsenal U21s		1–3	0–0	1–3	1–0	1–1	2–1	1–2	0–1	4–1	4–2	4–0
Aston Villa U21s	0–2		1–0	3–0	1–0	0–3	0–0	1–2	1–5	1–1	3–0	2–1
Blackburn Rovers U21s	0–0	1–1		0–1	0–0	3–4	0–1	1–3	0–1	5–2	2–2	1–0
Bolton Wanderers U21s	1–3	0–2	3–0		0–0	1–0	1–2	3–3	1–1	2–2	1–3	1–1
Brighton & Hove Albion U21s	0–4	2–0	0–2	1–0		1–0	3–0	3–0	0–2	3–0	0–0	1–1
Derby County U21s	1–0	3–2	0–1	1–1	2–1		2–1	4–0	0–1	7–1	1–1	2–0
Middlesbrough U21s	3–2	3–2	3–1	3–0	2–1	1–0		2–1	0–3	2–0	2–0	1–0
Newcastle United U21s	1–2	5–0	4–2	1–1	3–1	0–2	0–1		5–2	1–1	1–1	2–1
Reading U21s	0–1	1–0	2–1	1–3	1–0	1–2	3–3	4–3		3–0	0–1	3–1
Stoke City U21s	0–3	2–0	1–0	1–1	1–0	2–1	0–3	1–2	1–2		1–1	2–4
West Bromwich Albion U21s	3–0	4–1	0–1	3–2	2–1	0–0	1–3	3–2	5–0	3–1		2–1
Wolverhampton Wanderers U21s	2–2	0–1	2–2	1–0	1–1	1–3	1–2	2–2	2–1	4–2	0–0	

Updated to match(es) played on 19 May 2015. Source: U21 Premier League results
Legend: Blue = home team win; Yellow = draw; Red = away team win.

=== Top goalscorers ===
As of 23 May 2015

Rank	Player	Club	Goals
1	(England) Ryan Seager	Southampton U21s	16
2	(Pakistan) Adil Nabi	West Bromwich Albion U21s	14
2	(England) Dominic Solanke	Chelsea U21s	14
4	(England) Adam Armstrong	Newcastle United U21s	11
4	(England) Duncan Watmore	Sunderland U21s	11
6	(Nigeria) Alex Iwobi	Arsenal U21s	10
7	(England) Chuba Akpom	Arsenal U21s	9
8	(England) Dominic Samuel	Reading U21s	8
9	(Guadeloupe) Ange-Freddy Plumain	Fulham U21s	7

=== Hat-tricks ===
As of 23 May 2015

Player	For	Against	Result	Date	Division	Ref.
(England) Adam Armstrong	Newcastle United U21s	Reading U21s	5–2 (H)	25 August 2014	Division 2	
(England) Chuba Akpom	Arsenal U21s	West Bromwich Albion U21s	4–2 (H)	28 August 2014	Division 2	
(Belgium) Adnan Januzaj	Manchester United U21s	Sunderland U21s	4–0 (H)	15 September 2014	Division 1	
(Jamaica) Jamar Loza	Norwich City U21s	Leicester City U21s	5–0 (H)	19 September 2014	Division 1	
(Pakistan) Adil Nabi	West Bromwich Albion U21s	Aston Villa U21s	4–1 (H)	16 October 2014	Division 2	
(England) Chuba Akpom	Arsenal U21s	Brighton & Hove Albion U21s	0–4 (A)	1 December 2014	Division 2	
(England) Dominic Samuel	Reading U21s	Aston Villa U21s	1–5 (A)	1 December 2014	Division 2	
(Jamaica) Kemar Roofe	West Bromwich Albion U21s	Reading U21s	5–0 (H)	5 January 2015	Division 2	
(Spain) Jose Tasende	Manchester City EDS	Leicester City U21s	4–2 (H)	4 April 2015	Division 1	
(Nigeria) Alex Iwobi	Arsenal U21s	Stoke City U21s	4–1 (H)	7 April 2015	Division 2	
(England) Dominic Solanke	Chelsea U21s	Liverpool U21s	4–3 (H)	7 May 2015	Division 1	
(England) Josh Murphy	Norwich City U21s	Liverpool U21s	4–4 (A)	7 May 2015	Division 1	

Note

(H) – Home; (A) – Away
^{4} – player scored 4 goals

=== Awards ===
Player of the season: (England) Duncan Watmore (Sunderland)

Player of the month

Month	Player	Club	Ref
February	(England) Ryan Seager	Southampton U21s	
March	(Saint Kitts and Nevis) Harry Panayiotou	Leicester City U21s	
April	(England) Duncan Watmore	Sunderland U21s	

== League 2 ==
Professional Development U21 League
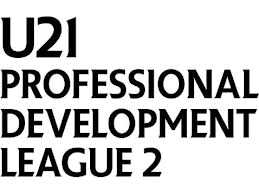
- Season: 2014–15
- Champions: Swansea City U21s (1st Title)
- Regular Season Champions: Nottingham Forest U21s (1st Title)
- Matches: 255 (252 RS, 3 PO)
- Goals: 819 (3.21 per match) (800 RS, 19 PO)
- Top goalscorer: (Curaçao) Kenji Gorre Swansea City U21s (17 Goals)
- Biggest home win: Sheffield United U21s 7–0 Coventry City U21s (12 January 2015)
- Biggest away win: Colchester United U21s 0–5 Sheffield Wednesday U21s (13 October 2014); Huddersfield Town U21s 0–5 Leeds United U21s (9 March 2015)
- Highest scoring: Millwall U21s 7–3 Bristol City U21s (16 February 2015)
- Longest winning run: 6 Matches Nottingham Forest U21s
- Longest unbeaten run: 14 Matches Nottingham Forest U21s; Swansea City U21s
- Longest winless run: 11 Matches Barnsley U21s
- Longest losing run: 8 Matches Barnsley U21s

League 2, referred to as the Professional Development U21 League, is split into two regional divisions.

Teams will play each team in their own division twice, and each team in the other division once, for a total of 26 games for North division teams, and 27 games each for South division teams.

At the end of the season, the teams finishing in the top two positions of both divisions will meet in the knockout stage to determine the overall league champion.

19 Teams competed this season, 1 fewer than last season. Brighton & Hove Albion U21s joined the Premier League 2 as a Category One Academy alongside Derby County U21s on July 25 after 2 seasons apiece. Meanwhile, Colchester United U21s returned after a one season absence when they resecured their Category Two Academy status.

=== League stage ===
==== North Division table ====
Pos	Team	Pld	W	D	L	GF	GA	GD	Pts	Qualification
1	Nottingham Forest U21s	26	17	4	5	56	30	+26	55	Qualification for Knock-out stage
2	Huddersfield Town U21s	26	15	3	8	47	40	+7	48	Qualification for Knock-out stage
3	Sheffield United U21s	26	13	5	8	43	28	+15	44	
4	Leeds United U21s	26	12	7	7	48	36	+12	43	
5	Sheffield Wednesday U21s	26	10	8	8	38	30	+8	38	
6	Birmingham City U21s	26	11	5	10	36	34	+2	38	
7	Crewe Alexandra U21s	26	7	5	14	41	55	−14	26	
8	Coventry City U21s	26	5	7	14	28	42	−14	22	
9	Barnsley U21s	26	3	5	18	29	62	−33	14	

==== South Division table ====
Pos	Team	Pld	W	D	L	GF	GA	GD	Pts	Qualification
1	Crystal Palace U21s	27	17	2	8	58	34	+24	53	Qualification for Knock-out stage
2	Swansea City U21s	27	13	8	6	50	38	+12	47	Qualification for Knock-out stage
3	Cardiff City U21s	27	12	5	10	35	34	+1	41	
4	Queens Park Rangers U21s	27	11	7	9	44	49	−5	40	
5	Ipswich Town U21s	27	10	7	10	38	38	0	37	
6	Millwall U21s	27	9	9	9	43	40	+3	36	
7	Charlton Athletic U21s	27	10	6	11	42	42	0	36	
8	Brentford U21s	27	9	6	12	54	55	−1	33	
9	Colchester United U21s	27	8	6	13	38	47	−9	30	
10	Bristol City U21s	27	7	1	19	32	66	−34	22	

==== Results ====
Home \ Away	BAR	BIR	BRE	BRI	CAR	CHA	COL	COV	CRE	CPA	HUD	IPS	LEE	MIL	NOT	QPR	SHE	SHW	SWA
Barnsley U21s		0–2		0–2		0–3		0–2	2–2	0–2	0–1		2–2	0–2	2–3		1–2	2–2	1–1
Birmingham City U21s	2–1		1–1		1–2		3–1	2–1	4–3		2–3	2–0	1–1		0–1	1–1	0–2	0–3	
Brentford U21s	7–2			5–1	4–1	2–3	2–2	2–1		3–0	1–2	1–0		1–1	0–3	2–1		1–1	2–4
Bristol City U21s		4–1	5–2		0–1	2–3	2–1		2–0	0–2		0–3	1–2	1–3		1–3	2–0		0–2
Cardiff City U21s	3–2		0–1	3–0		0–1	0–2	4–2		1–0	1–3	0–0		0–0	5–1	0–0		0–1	0–1
Charlton Athletic U21s		1–1	1–1	0–2	2–3		0–0		5–1	2–2		0–1	0–1	1–2		2–0	2–0		0–2
Colchester United U21s	2–0		3–2	0–1	0–1	0–3		2–2		4–2	1–2	2–3		2–0	1–3	0–2		0–5	5–2
Coventry City U21s	1–2	0–1		2–0		2–2			1–2	0–2	2–2		0–1	1–2	0–2		2–2	0–0	0–0
Crewe Alexandra U21s	3–3	3–1	4–2		3–1		1–3	0–3			3–1	2–2	1–2		0–0	2–3	1–2	1–1	
Crystal Palace U21s		0–1	3–1	4–2	4–0	5–2	1–0		1–2			1–0	4–2	3–0		7–2	1–0		2–3
Huddersfield Town U21s	0–3	0–0		4–1		0–1		1–0	2–1	2–3			0–5	2–0	2–1		1–2	0–2	3–1
Ipswich Town U21s	6–3		3–2	2–3	1–1	5–1	2–0	0–1		0–1	1–4			2–1	0–3	0–3		1–1	1–0
Leeds United U21s	3–1	0–3	2–1		2–2		1–2	1–1	2–0		4–1	2–3			1–1	1–2	4–1	0–0	
Millwall U21s		3–0	2–2	7–3	1–2	2–1	2–2		2–1	0–1		1–1	1–2			3–3	0–0		3–3
Nottingham Forest U21s	4–0	2–0		3–0		1–2		2–1	3–1	2–0	1–1		3–3	4–3			2–0	2–1	2–5
Queens Park Rangers U21s	2–0		1–4	3–1	0–2	3–3	3–3	0–2		0–3	1–4	1–1		2–1	2–1			2–1	2–2
Sheffield United U21s	3–0	1–0	4–1		1–0		0–0	7–0	0–3		2–3	2–0	2–1		0–2	0–1		1–1	
Sheffield Wednesday U21s	0–2	0–2		3–1		2–0		3–1	5–0	2–1	1–3		1–2	0–0	0–4		0–3		2–1
Swansea City U21s		3–2	4–1	0–0	1–2	2–1	2–0		2–1	3–3		0–0	2–1	0–1		2–1	2–2		

Updated to match(es) played on 30 April 2015. Source: Futbol24 U21 PDL results
Legend: Blue = home team win; Yellow = draw; Red = away team win.

=== Knock-out stage ===
==== Semifinals ====
5 May 2015
14:00

Crystal Palace U21s	3–5 (a.e.t.)	Huddersfield Town U21s
De Silva 39', 70'; Kaikai 90'	Report	Boyle 7' Tronstad 55' Holmes 85' Charles 104' 120'

Selhurst Park, Selhurst
Referee: Ben Cooke

6 May 2015
19:00

Nottingham Forest U21s	3–3 (a.e.t.)	Swansea City U21s
Grant 9'; Thorne 23'; Iacovitti 116'		Jones 85'; Samuel 90' 105'
Penalties
	4–5

City Ground, West Bridgford
Attendance: 572
Referee: Paul Yates

==== Final ====
13 May 2015
19:30

Swansea City U21s	3–2	Huddersfield Town U21s
Samuel 39'; Gorre 64' 84'		Bojaj 32' 87'

Liberty Stadium, Swansea
Attendance: 2,156

=== Top goalscorers ===
As of 13 May 2015

Rank	Player	Club	Goals
1	(Curaçao) Kenji Gorre	Swansea City U21s	17
2	(England) Jermaine Udumaga	Brentford U21s	13
2	(England) Kyle De Silva	Crystal Palace U21s	13
4	(Paraguay) Brian Montenegro	Leeds United U21s	12
5	(Republic of Ireland) Reece Grego-Cox	Queens Park Rangers U21s	10
6	(England) Danny Johnson	Cardiff City U21s	9
6	(Wales) Callum Saunders	Crewe Alexandra U21s	9
6	(England) Reece Brown	Birmingham City U21s	9
6	(Wales) Connor Lemonheigh-Evans	Bristol City U21s	9
10	(Ghana) Zak Ansah	Charlton Athletic U21s	8
10	(England) Karlan Ahearne-Grant	Charlton Athletic U21s	8
10	(England) George Maris	Barnsley U21s	8
10	(Zimbabwe) Macauley Bonne	Colchester United U21s	8
10	(Scotland) Oliver Burke	Nottingham Forest U21s	8

== See also ==
- 2014–15 Professional U18 Development League
- 2014–15 FA Cup
- 2014–15 FA Youth Cup
- 2014–15 Premier League International Cup
- 2014–15 Under-21 Premier League Cup
- 2014–15 in English football
