= 2013–14 Professional U18 Development League =

The 2013–14 Professional U18 Development League (League 1 referred to as the Barclays Under 18 Premier League for sponsorship reasons) is the second season of the Professional Development League system.

There are 96 participating teams in the 2013–14 Professional U18 Development Leagues.

== League 1 ==
Barclays U18 Premier League
- Season: 2013–14
- Champions: Everton U18s (1st Title)
- Matches: 344 (341 RS, 3 PO)
- Goals: 1,233 (3.58 per match) (1,228 RS, 5 PO)
- Biggest home win: Middlesbrough U18s 9–1 Fulham U18s (29 April 2014)
- Biggest away win: Newcastle United U18s 0–6 Manchester City U18s (19 October 2013)
- Highest scoring: Middlesbrough U18s 9–1 Fulham U18s (29 April 2014)
- Longest winning run: 11 matches Manchester City U18s (19 October 2013- 1 February 2014)
- Longest unbeaten run: 12 matches Manchester City U18s (5 October 2013- 1 February 2014)
- Longest winless run: 14 matches Bolton Wanderers U18s
- Longest losing run: 8 matches Leicester City U18s

=== League stage ===
Teams played each team in their own division twice and each team from the other division once, for a total of 31 games per team. The top two teams from each division progressed to the play-offs to determine the overall winner of the League as a whole. Leicester City joined after their academy was promoted to Category One Status.

==== North Division ====
Pos	Team	Pld	W	D	L	GF	GA	GD	Pts	Qualification
1	Manchester City U18s	31	22	4	5	87	40	+47	70	Qualification for Knockout stage
2	Everton U18s	31	20	2	9	62	41	+21	62	Qualification for Knockout stage
3	Liverpool U18s	31	15	5	11	69	59	+10	50	
4	Manchester United U18s	31	15	3	13	60	51	+9	48	
5	Newcastle United U18s	31	15	2	14	49	57	−8	47	
6	Sunderland U18s	31	13	6	12	54	43	+11	45	
7	Wolverhampton Wanderers U18s	31	10	7	14	47	65	−18	37	
8	Middlesbrough U18s	31	11	3	17	50	62	−12	36	
9	Bolton Wanderers U18s	31	10	3	18	49	74	−25	33	
10	Blackburn Rovers U18s	31	8	5	18	61	84	−23	29	
11	Stoke City U18s	31	6	6	19	34	61	−27	24	

==== South Division ====
Pos	Team	Pld	W	D	L	GF	GA	GD	Pts	Qualification
1	Tottenham Hotspur U18s	31	19	6	6	82	48	+34	63	Qualification for Knockout stage
2	West Ham United U18s	31	17	6	8	56	36	+20	57	Qualification for Knockout stage
3	Reading U18s	31	16	4	11	59	57	+2	52	
4	Fulham U18s	31	15	6	10	67	63	+4	51	
5	Chelsea U18s	31	14	7	10	63	47	+16	49	
6	Southampton U18s	31	12	10	9	57	50	+7	46	
7	Aston Villa U18s	31	13	7	11	62	61	+1	46	
8	Norwich City U18s	31	12	5	14	41	51	−10	41	
9	Arsenal U18s	31	8	10	13	42	48	−6	34	
10	West Bromwich Albion U18s	31	6	6	19	40	64	−24	24	
11	Leicester City U18s	31	6	3	22	37	66	−29	21	

=== Knockout stage ===
==== Semi-finals ====
10 May 2014
11:00 BST

Manchester City U18s	2 – 1	West Ham U18s
Smith-Brown 80'; Bryan 85' (pen.)	Report	Brown 8'

Platt Lane, Manchester
Referee: Chris Isherwood

11 May 2014
17:30 BST

Everton U18s	1 – 0	Tottenham Hotspur U18s
Donohue 76'	Report

Goodison Park, Liverpool

==== Final ====
17 May 2014
17:30 BST

Everton U18s	1 – 0	Manchester City U18s
Charsley 55'	Report

Goodison Park, Liverpool
Attendance: 1,450

== League 2 ==
Professional U18 Development League 2
- Season: 2013–14
- Champions: Huddersfield Town U18s (1st Title)
- Matches: 263 (260 RS, 3 PO)
- Goals: 939 (3.57 per match) (926 RS, 13 PO)

=== League stage ===
Teams play each team in their own division twice, and eight of the teams in the other division once, to complete 26 fixtures. The top two teams from each division progress to the knockout stage to determine the overall winner. 20 teams competed as Leicester City was promoted to category one status, and Barnet was relegated from the football league, and Wigan Athletic downgraded their academy to category 3 status. Colchester United also lost their category 2 status temporarily, but would return the following season.Meanwhile, Crystal Palace joined this season after dropping their academy to Category Two Status, joining the South Division.

==== North Division ====
Pos	Team	Pld	W	D	L	GF	GA	GD	Pts	Qualification
1	Huddersfield Town U18s	26	18	3	5	67	36	+31	57	Qualification for Knockout stage
2	Crewe Alexandra U18s	26	13	5	8	64	51	+13	44	Qualification for Knockout stage
3	Birmingham City U18s	26	12	5	9	55	47	+8	41	
4	Barnsley U18s	26	13	2	11	46	42	+4	41	
5	Leeds United U18s	26	10	6	10	48	44	+4	36	
6	Coventry City U18s	26	10	5	11	50	54	−4	35	
7	Sheffield United U18s	26	9	6	11	44	49	−5	33	
8	Nottingham Forest U18s	26	9	6	11	41	53	−12	33	
9	Derby County U18s	26	7	9	10	44	52	−8	30	
10	Sheffield Wednesday U18s	26	7	6	13	44	48	−4	27	

==== South Division ====
Pos	Team	Pld	W	D	L	GF	GA	GD	Pts	Qualification
1	Charlton Athletic U18s	26	13	9	4	49	31	+18	48	Qualification for Knockout stage
2	Queens Park Rangers U18s	26	14	5	7	51	31	+20	47	Qualification for Knockout stage
3	Cardiff City U18s	26	11	7	8	50	42	+8	40	
4	Brighton & Hove Albion U18s	26	12	3	11	42	44	−2	39	
5	Crystal Palace U18s	26	10	4	12	51	55	−4	34	
6	Bristol City U18s	26	9	7	10	27	45	−18	34	
7	Ipswich Town U18s	26	8	5	13	39	42	−3	29	
8	Millwall U18s	26	8	5	13	42	48	−6	29	
9	Brentford U18s	26	7	6	13	37	55	−18	27	
10	Swansea City U18s	26	5	6	15	35	57	−22	21	

=== Knockout stage ===
==== Semi-finals ====
26 April 2014
11:00

Huddersfield Town U18s	2 – 1	Queens Park Rangers U18s
Holmes; Charles		Comley 62'

Canalside, Huddersfield

26 April 2014
11:00

Charlton Athletic U18s	2 – 2 (a.e.t.)	Crewe Alexandra U18s
Ahearne-Grant 51' (pen.) 108'		Jones 42' (pen.); O'Neill 118'
Penalties
Thomas (penalty scored); Ahearne-Grant (penalty scored); Kennedy (penalty scored); Browne (penalty missed); Charles-Cook (penalty scored); Bokciu (penalty missed)	4 – 5	(penalty scored) Jones; (penalty scored) O'Neill; (penalty scored) Ng; (penalty scored) Speed; (penalty missed) Kearns; (penalty scored) Howell

Sparrows Lane, London

==== Final ====
3 May 2014
11:00

Huddersfield Town U18s	3 – 3 (a.e.t.)	Crewe Alexandra U18s
Boyle; Charles; Atkinson 89'	Report	Goal
Penalties
Charles (penalty missed); Bojaj (penalty scored); Booty (penalty missed); Holmes (penalty scored); Hoyle (penalty scored); Boyle (penalty scored); Wilkinson (penalty scored); Pells (penalty scored)	6 – 5	Penalty scored Penalty missed

John Smith's Stadium, Huddersfield

== League 3 ==
Football League Youth Alliance
- Season: 2013–14
- Champions: North-East Division; Bradford City U18s; North-West Division; Blackpool U18s; South-East Division; Colchester United U18s; South-West Division; Exeter City U18s

54 teams participated this season.

=== League stage ===
==== North-West Division ====
Pos	Team	Pld	W	D	L	GF	GA	GD	Pts
1	Blackpool U18s (C)	24	18	4	2	59	20	+39	58
2	Oldham Athletic U18s	23	16	3	4	58	27	+31	51
3	Rochdale U18s	23	16	0	7	65	37	+28	48
4	Walsall U18s	23	14	5	4	44	17	+27	47
5	Tranmere Rovers U18s	23	12	3	8	34	27	+7	39
6	Carlisle United U18s	24	11	3	10	48	43	+5	36
7	Bury U18s	24	10	6	8	44	46	−2	36
8	Burnley U18s	24	10	5	9	46	31	+15	35
9	Port Vale U18s	23	10	4	9	43	44	−1	34
10	Fleetwood Town U18s	24	9	2	13	23	40	−17	29
11	Preston North End U18s	24	8	4	12	39	47	−8	28
12	Wigan Athletic U18s	24	6	8	10	39	50	−11	26
13	Macclesfield Town U18s	23	7	3	13	27	41	−14	24
14	Accrington Stanley U18s	24	5	8	11	28	37	−9	23
15	Shrewsbury Town U18s	23	6	2	15	29	48	−19	20
16	Morecambe U18s	24	5	2	17	30	75	−45	17
17	Wrexham U18s	23	4	4	15	27	53	−26	16

(C) Champions

==== North-East Division ====
Pos	Team	Pld	W	D	L	GF	GA	GD	Pts
1	Bradford City U18s (C)	22	15	5	2	68	31	+37	50
2	Doncaster Rovers U18s	22	14	4	4	59	29	+30	46
3	Scunthorpe United U18s	22	12	3	7	53	40	+13	39
4	Notts County U18s	22	11	3	8	43	33	+10	36
5	York City U18s	22	10	4	8	33	37	−4	34
6	Hull City U18s	22	10	3	9	42	29	+13	33
7	Hartlepool United U18s	22	9	3	10	49	60	−11	30
8	Burton Albion U18s	22	8	5	9	35	46	−11	29
9	Rotherham United U18s	22	5	6	11	32	49	−17	21
10	Grimsby Town U18s	22	4	6	12	15	43	−28	18
11	Chesterfield U18s	22	4	5	13	28	44	−16	17
12	Lincoln City U18s	22	4	5	13	26	42	−16	17

(C) Champions

==== South-West Division ====
Pos	Team	Pld	W	D	L	GF	GA	GD	Pts
1	Exeter City U18s (C)	16	10	2	4	40	20	+20	32
2	Bristol Rovers U18s	16	9	5	2	29	15	+14	32
3	Plymouth Argyle U18s	16	10	1	5	29	16	+13	31
4	Oxford United U18s	16	9	3	4	33	20	+13	30
5	Cheltenham Town U18s	16	8	2	6	35	26	+9	26
6	AFC Bournemouth U18s	16	6	4	6	24	24	0	22
7	Swindon Town U18s	16	5	1	10	28	40	−12	16
8	Torquay United U18s	16	2	2	12	17	43	−26	8
9	Newport County U18s	16	2	2	12	15	46	−31	8
10	Hereford United U18s (Note: Hereford United record expunged)	0	0	0	0	0	0	0	0

(C) Champions

==== South-East Division ====
Pos	Team	Pld	W	D	L	GF	GA	GD	Pts
1	Colchester United U18s (C)	21	14	3	4	58	31	+27	45
2	Peterborough United U18s	21	13	5	3	53	25	+28	44
3	Gillingham U18s	20	11	5	4	47	28	+19	38
4	Watford U18s	21	11	3	7	38	27	+11	36
5	Luton Town U18s	21	11	3	7	33	24	+9	36
6	Portsmouth U18s	20	10	3	7	37	32	+5	33
7	Southend United U18s	20	9	4	7	37	36	+1	31
8	Leyton Orient U18s	20	9	1	10	39	36	+3	28
9	Northampton Town U18s	21	8	4	9	29	35	−6	28
10	AFC Wimbledon U18s	20	8	3	9	30	31	−1	27
11	Stevenage U18s	21	8	3	10	43	54	−11	27
12	Barnet U18s	21	7	1	13	30	39	−9	22
13	Milton Keynes Dons U18s	21	6	3	12	45	62	−17	21
14	Crawley Town U18s	20	4	4	12	28	47	−19	16
15	Dagenham & Redbridge U18s	20	2	1	17	22	62	−40	7

(C) Champions

== See also ==
- 2013–14 Professional U21 Development League
- 2013–14 FA Cup
- 2013–14 FA Youth Cup
- 2013–14 in English football
