= 2015–16 Professional U21 Development League =

The 2015–16 Professional U21 Development League is the fourth season of the Professional Development League system.

== League 1 ==
Barclays U21 Premier League
- Season: 2015–16
- Champions: Manchester United U21s (3rd Title); Division 2 Derby County U21s (1st Title)
- Promoted: Derby County U21s; Arsenal U21s
- Relegated: Middlesbrough U21s; Norwich City U21s
- Matches: 267 (264 RS, 3 PO)
- Goals: 788 (2.95 per match) (778 RS, 10 PO)
- Top goalscorer: Overall (England) Stephy Mavididi Arsenal U21s (13 Goals); Division 1 (Austria) Arnel Jakupovic Middlesbrough U21s (12 Goals); Division 2 (England) Stephy Mavididi Arsenal U21s (13 Goals)
- Biggest home win: Manchester United U21s 7–0 Norwich City U21s (8 February 2016)
- Biggest away win: Leicester City U21s 1–6 Sunderland U21s (2 November 2015); Norwich City U21s 0–5 Middlesbrough U21s (17 November 2015); Liverpool U21s 0–5 Southampton U21s (20 March 2016)
- Highest scoring: Tottenham Hotspur U21s 7–4 Leicester City U21s (21 September 2015)
- Longest winning run: 6 Matches Manchester United U21s
- Longest unbeaten run: 7 Matches Arsenal U21s, Aston Villa U21s, Swansea City U21s
- Longest winless run: 19 Matches Wolverhampton Wanderers U21s
- Longest losing run: 5 Matches Wolverhampton Wanderers U21s
- Highest attendance: 9,278 Norwich City U21s 0–0 Liverpool U21s (21 December 2015)
- Lowest attendance: 20 Everton U21s 2–2 Middlesbrough U21s (17 March 2016)

League 1, referred to as the Barclays Under 21 Premier League for sponsorship reasons, was split into two divisions, with teams allocated places in Division 1 or 2 based on their performance in the 2014–15 season.

At the end of the season, the team which finished top of Division 1 was crowned as overall League 1 champions, and the bottom two teams in Division 1 will be relegated to Division 2 for the 2016–17 season.

=== Division 1 ===
==== Table ====
Pos	Team	Pld	W	D	L	GF	GA	GD	Pts	Qualification or relegation
1	Manchester United U21s (C)	22	15	3	4	44	19	+25	48	
2	Sunderland U21s	22	13	4	5	38	20	+18	43	
3	Everton U21s	22	10	7	5	35	27	+8	37	
4	Manchester City EDS	22	10	4	8	35	26	+9	34	
5	Chelsea U21s	22	9	6	7	34	30	+4	33	
6	Southampton U21s	22	8	6	8	39	40	−1	30	
7	Liverpool U21s	22	8	4	10	26	37	−11	28	
8	Tottenham Hotspur U21s	22	7	6	9	44	43	+1	27	
9	Reading U21s	22	7	6	9	34	40	−6	27	
10	Leicester City U21s	22	6	3	13	25	48	−23	21	
11	Middlesbrough U21s (R)	22	5	5	12	33	37	−4	20	Relegation to 2016–17 U23 Premier League Division 2
12	Norwich City U21s (R)	22	5	4	13	30	50	−20	19	Relegation to 2016–17 U23 Premier League Division 2

Updated to match(es) played on 12 May 2016. Source:
(C) Champions; (R) Relegated

==== Results ====
Home \ Away	CHE	EVE	LEI	LIV	MNC	MNU	MID	NOR	REA	SOT	SUN	TOT
Chelsea U21s		0–0	2–1	4–0	0–2	0–1	1–0	5–0	3–3	1–3	1–3	1–3
Everton U21s	2–0		3–1	3–3	1–0	2–0	2–2	3–1	0–2	3–1	1–1	1–1
Leicester City U21s	3–0	1–1		0–2	1–0	1–1	1–1	0–1	2–1	2–1	1–6	0–3
Liverpool U21s	0–1	1–3	2–1		0–3	1–1	2–1	2–1	2–0	0–5	0–2	2–0
Manchester City EDS	0–1	0–1	1–3	2–0		1–0	5–1	1–0	3–1	3–1	1–1	3–3
Manchester United U21s	1–1	3–1	6–1	1–0	1–0		1–0	7–0	1–0	4–0	1–0	3–1
Middlesbrough U21s	1–3	1–0	4–0	2–3	3–1	1–2		1–1	1–1	1–3	0–1	1–2
Norwich City U21s	2–2	1–2	2–0	0–0	1–2	2–0	0–5		4–4	7–2	0–2	2–3
Reading U21s	1–3	1–1	1–0	2–1	0–3	1–3	3–2	2–0		2–5	2–1	1–1
Southampton U21s	0–0	0–2	3–1	1–2	2–2	2–1	1–1	3–2	1–1		0–2	1–1
Sunderland U21s	0–0	3–2	0–1	1–0	3–0	0–1	3–2	3–1	2–1	2–2		1–0
Tottenham Hotspur U21s	4–5	4–1	7–4	1–1	2–2	2–3	1–2	1–2	1–4	0–2	3–1	

Updated to match(es) played on 29 April 2016. Source: U21 Premier League results
Legend: Blue = home team win; Yellow = draw; Red = away team win.

=== Division 2 ===
==== Table ====
Pos	Team	Pld	W	D	L	GF	GA	GD	Pts	Promotion or qualification
1	Derby County U21s (P)	22	13	3	6	44	26	+18	42	Promotion to 2016–17 U23 Premier League Division 1
2	Arsenal U21s (P)	22	12	4	6	40	25	+15	40	Qualification for Play-offs
3	Swansea City U21s	22	12	3	7	42	24	+18	39	Qualification for Play-offs
4	Aston Villa U21s	22	11	6	5	28	27	+1	39	Qualification for Play-offs
5	Blackburn Rovers U21s	22	10	4	8	29	33	−4	34	Qualification for Play-offs
6	West Bromwich Albion U21s	22	8	9	5	24	20	+4	33	Qualification for 2016–17 U23 Premier League Division 2
7	West Ham United U21s	22	9	5	8	37	34	+3	32	Qualification for 2016–17 U23 Premier League Division 2
8	Stoke City U21s	22	10	2	10	24	24	0	32	Qualification for 2016–17 U23 Premier League Division 2
9	Fulham U21s	22	8	5	9	26	29	−3	29	Qualification for 2016–17 U23 Premier League Division 2
10	Newcastle United U21s	22	4	6	12	30	48	−18	18	Qualification for 2016–17 U23 Premier League Division 2
11	Brighton & Hove Albion U21s	22	2	8	12	17	36	−19	14	Qualification for 2016–17 U23 Premier League Division 2
12	Wolverhampton Wanderers U21s	22	2	7	13	20	35	−15	13	Qualification for 2016–17 U23 Premier League Division 2

Updated to match(es) played on 10 May 2016. Source:
(P) Promoted

==== Results ====
Home \ Away	ARS	AST	BLB	B&HA	DER	FUL	NEW	STO	SWA	WBA	WHU	WOL
Arsenal U21s		1–2	3–2	4–1	3–2	1–0	3–1	0–1	0–0	1–2	5–0	1–1
Aston Villa U21s	1–0		2–2	2–1	2–1	1–0	0–0	0–0	2–1	0–1	3–2	1–0
Blackburn Rovers U21s	1–0	2–2		3–0	0–1	0–2	2–1	1–0	2–0	2–1	4–3	2–1
Brighton & Hove Albion U21s	1–2	1–1	0–1		0–4	3–3	1–1	1–0	0–1	0–0	1–2	0–0
Derby County U21s	1–2	0–1	3–0	2–2		3–0	6–4	3–1	2–1	2–0	1–1	1–0
Fulham U21s	0–3	2–2	3–0	1–0	0–1		0–2	1–1	1–0	1–1	1–3	0–3
Newcastle United U21s	1–2	2–0	1–1	1–4	1–3	0–3		1–2	1–1	0–0	1–4	2–1
Stoke City U21s	1–3	2–1	1–0	1–0	1–2	1–2	3–0		1–2	2–1	2–1	1–0
Swansea City U21s	3–1	5–0	5–0	4–0	2–1	3–0	5–3	2–0		1–2	0–1	3–2
West Bromwich Albion U21s	1–1	1–0	1–0	1–1	1–1	1–1	2–4	2–0	3–0		2–1	0–0
West Ham United U21s	1–1	1–2	1–1	2–0	3–2	0–2	2–2	1–0	1–2	2–1		4–0
Wolverhampton Wanderers U21s	2–3	2–3	2–3	0–0	1–2	0–3	3–1	0–3	1–1	0–0	1–1	

Updated to match(es) played on 19 April 2016. Source: U21 Premier League results
Legend: Blue = home team win; Yellow = draw; Red = away team win.

===== Play-offs =====
Semifinals
2	Arsenal U21s	2
5	Blackburn Rovers U21s	1
3	Swansea City U21s	1
4	Aston Villa U21s	2

Final
2	Arsenal U21s	3
4	Aston Villa U21s	1

==== Semifinals ====
25 April 2016
13:00

Swansea City U21s	1–2	Aston Villa U21s
Gorre 38'		Hale 36'; Hepburn-Murphy 53' (pen.)

Liberty Stadium, Swansea
Attendance: 988
Referee: Richard Hulme

3 May 2016
13:00

Arsenal U21s	2–1	Blackburn Rovers U21s
Willock 49', 80'		Rankin-Costello 64'

Emirates Stadium, Holloway
Attendance: 1,106
Referee: Christopher O'Donnell

==== Final ====
10 May 2016
13:00

Arsenal U21s	3–1	Aston Villa U21s
Willock 36'; Mavididi 64', 87'	Report	Hepburn-Murphy 10'

Emirates Stadium, Holloway
Attendance: 2,357
Referee: Carl Brook

=== Top goalscorers ===
As of 12 May 2016

Rank	Player	Club	Goals
1	(England) Stephy Mavididi	Arsenal U21s	13
2	(Austria) Arnel Jakupovic	Middlesbrough U21s	12
3	(Kosovo) Bersant Celina	Manchester City EDS	11
3	(Saint Kitts and Nevis) Rowan Liburd	Reading U21s	11
5	(Republic of Ireland) Will Keane	Manchester United U21s	10
6	(England) Tammy Abraham	Chelsea U21s	9
6	(Spain) Ivan Calero	Derby County U21s	9
6	(England) Kieran Dowell	Everton U21s	9
6	(England) Dominic Telford	Stoke City U21s	9
10	(England) Shayon Harrison	Tottenham Hotspur U21s	8
10	(Wales) Owain Jones	Swansea City U21s	8
10	(Scotland) Oliver McBurnie	Swansea City U21s	8
10	(England) Callum Roberts	Newcastle United U21s	8
10	(Republic of the Congo) Offrande Zanzala	Derby County U21s	8

=== Hat-tricks ===
As of 12 May 2016

Player	For	Against	Result	Date	Division	Ref.
(England) Duncan Watmore	Sunderland U21s	Manchester City EDS	3–0 (H)	20 September 2015	Division 1	
(England) Bradley Fewster	Middlesbrough U21s	Norwich City U21s	0–5 (A)	17 November 2015	Division 1	
(Jamaica) Jamar Loza^{5}	Norwich City U21s	Southampton U21s	7–2 (H)	30 November 2015	Division 1	
(Republic of Ireland) Will Keane	Manchester United U21s	Reading U21s	1–3 (A)	11 January 2016	Division 1	
(Republic of Ireland) Will Keane^{5}	Manchester United U21s	Norwich City U21s	7–0 (H)	8 February 2016	Division 1	
(England) Sheyi Ojo	Liverpool U21s	Middlesbrough U21s	2–3 (A)	7 March 2016	Division 1	
(Netherlands) Marvin Emnes	Swansea City U21s	Blackburn Rovers U21s	5–0 (H)	18 March 2016	Division 2	
(England) Jay Rodriguez	Southampton U21s	Liverpool U21s	0–5 (A)	20 March 2016	Division 1	
(England) Shayon Harrison	Tottenham Hotspur U21s	Sunderland U21s	3–1 (H)	11 April 2016	Division 1	
(England) Kieran Dowell	Everton U21s	Leicester City U21s	3–1 (H)	25 April 2016	Division 1	

Note

(H) – Home; (A) – Away
^{5} – player scored 5 goals

== Awards ==
=== Player of the Month ===
Month	Player	Club	Ref.
August	(United States) Lynden Gooch	Sunderland U21s	
September	(England) Ivan Toney	Newcastle United U21s	
October	(Republic of the Congo) Offrande Zanzala	Derby County U21s	
November	(England) Harry Chapman	Middlesbrough U21s	
December	(England) Kyle Walker-Peters	Tottenham Hotspur U21s	
January	(England) Callum Roberts	Newcastle United U21s	
February	(England) Rees Greenwood	Sunderland U21s	
March	(Republic of Ireland) Courtney Duffus	Everton U21s	
April	(Jamaica) Kasey Palmer	Chelsea U21s	

== League 2 ==
U21 Professional Development League 2
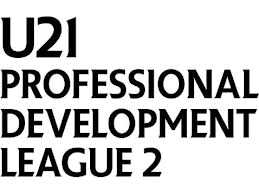
- Season: 2015–16
- Champions: Huddersfield Town U21s (1st Title)
- Regular Season Champions: Huddersfield Town U21s (2nd Title)
- Matches: 313 (310 RS, 3 PO)
- Goals: 957 (3.06 per match) (949 RS, 8 PO)
- Top goalscorer: (Scotland) Alex Jakubiak Watford U21s (16 Goals)
- Biggest home win: Barnsley U21s 6–0 Nottingham Forest U21s (14 December 2015)
- Biggest away win: Watford U21s 0–5 Crystal Palace U21s (14 March 2016)
- Highest scoring: Queens Park Rangers U21s 5–5 Huddersfield Town U21s (17 August 2015)
- Longest winning run: 12 Matches Huddersfield Town U21s
- Longest unbeaten run: 17 Matches Sheffield United U21s
- Longest winless run: 12 Matches Watford U21s
- Longest losing run: 6 Matches Bristol City U21s
- Highest attendance: 4,018 Sheffield United U21s 1–2 Huddersfield Town U21s (14 May 2016)

League 2, referred to as the U21 Professional Development League 2, is split into two regional divisions.

Teams will play each team in their own division twice, and each team in the other division once, for a total of 30 games for North division teams, and 29 games each for South division teams.

At the end of the season, the teams finishing in the top two positions of both divisions will meet in the knockout stage to determine the overall league champion.

21 Teams competed in the league this season, 2 more than last season. Swansea City U21s left the league after 3 seasons to join the Premier League 2 as a Category One Academy on July 10. Meanwhile, Bolton Wanderers U21s joined the league after dropping their Academy to Category Two Status in June. Hull City U21s, and Watford U21s joined the league after obtaining Category Two Academy status with Hull City joining in May, and on July 3 for Watford.

=== League stage ===
==== North Division table ====
Pos	Team	Pld	W	D	L	GF	GA	GD	Pts	Qualification
1	Huddersfield Town U21s	30	20	5	5	62	33	+29	65	Qualification for Knock-out stage
2	Sheffield United U21s	30	17	6	7	43	24	+19	57	Qualification for Knock-out stage
3	Hull City U21s	30	13	7	10	55	42	+13	46	
4	Birmingham City U21s	30	11	6	13	43	39	+4	39	
5	Nottingham Forest U21s	30	12	3	15	49	50	−1	39	
6	Bolton Wanderers U21s	30	9	10	11	41	45	−4	37	
7	Leeds United U21s	30	9	10	11	39	47	−8	37	
8	Crewe Alexandra U21s	30	10	6	14	47	55	−8	36	
9	Coventry City U21s	30	10	6	14	43	57	−14	36	
10	Sheffield Wednesday U21s	30	8	8	14	28	42	−14	32	
11	Barnsley U21s	30	9	4	17	41	55	−14	31	

Updated to match(es) played on 25 April 2016. Source:

==== South Division table ====
Pos	Team	Pld	W	D	L	GF	GA	GD	Pts	Qualification
1	Charlton Athletic U21s	29	16	9	4	52	29	+23	57	Qualification for Knock-out stage
2	Millwall U21s	29	15	9	5	45	25	+20	54	Qualification for Knock-out stage
3	Cardiff City U21s	29	16	5	8	50	30	+20	53	
4	Colchester United U21s	29	16	3	10	45	38	+7	51	
5	Crystal Palace U21s	29	11	7	11	55	51	+4	40	
6	Queens Park Rangers U21s	29	9	8	12	55	64	−9	35	
7	Ipswich Town U21s	29	9	6	14	35	45	−10	33	
8	Brentford U21s	29	8	8	13	50	63	−13	32	
9	Bristol City U21s	29	9	3	17	38	59	−21	30	
10	Watford U21s	29	5	7	17	33	56	−23	22	

Updated to match(es) played on 25 April 2016. Source:

==== Results ====
Home \ Away	BAR	BIR	BOL	BRE	BRI	CAR	CHA	COL	COV	CRE	CPA	HUD	HUL	IPS	LEE	MIL	NOT	QPR	SHE	SHW	WTF
Barnsley U21s		0–4	1–0		2–3				3–0	1–1	0–4	0–1	0–3	1–2	3–3		6–0	1–1	0–0	2–1	
Birmingham City U21s	2–0		2–2	1–3		1–2			2–1	1–0		2–1	2–2	3–1	1–2	3–0	1–2		0–0	1–1	2–0
Bolton Wanderers U21s	2–0	1–1			2–1		2–1		1–1	2–2		0–1	0–0		1–2	2–0	2–1	1–0	0–1	3–2	
Brentford U21s	4–2		1–3		2–1	3–2	1–2	1–2		3–3	2–2			1–1	2–2	0–3		0–0	2–3		4–3
Bristol City U21s		3–2		3–0		0–1	2–3	0–2	0–4		2–1	1–4		1–1		0–1	3–1	2–3	2–1	1–2	2–1
Cardiff City U21s	0–2		1–1	3–0	2–0		1–2	3–2		4–0	3–1		1–0	1–0		0–0		3–2	0–4	3–0	2–1
Charlton Athletic U21s	3–0	1–2		2–1	2–2	1–1		3–1	1–1		3–2	1–1		1–1	1–0	1–1		2–0		4–0	2–1
Colchester United U21s	4–1	2–1	1–0	3–1	2–0	0–2	2–1			3–0	2–3		1–0	1–0		1–2	2–0	2–5			0–0
Coventry City U21s	0–1	1–0	4–3	4–2		2–1		4–1		2–0		1–1	3–0		1–2		2–6	3–3	1–2	0–1	2–0
Crewe Alexandra U21s	4–2	4–1	1–1		3–1		0–3		2–0		2–3	0–3	2–1		3–1		0–2		1–1	3–0	5–3
Crystal Palace U21s		1–0	3–3	2–3	0–1	1–1	1–2	1–2	1–1			2–3	1–1	2–1	0–0	3–3		1–3	2–0		6–2
Huddersfield Town U21s	3–2	1–0	2–1	4–0		2–1		4–0	6–1	1–1			3–2	1–0	2–2		0–2		1–0	3–1	
Hull City U21s	2–3	2–1	3–0	3–1	2–0		1–1		5–0	1–3		3–1			1–1	0–0	2–4		1–1	0–2	
Ipswich Town U21s			2–1	1–3	6–1	0–5	2–2	0–3	3–0	4–2	0–1		1–2			0–2	1–1	1–0		1–0	0–2
Leeds United U21s	1–4	0–0	3–3		3–0	1–3		1–1	1–0	0–2		0–2	1–3	1–2			2–1	3–3	2–1	1–0	
Millwall U21s	4–2			1–0	1–0	1–1	0–0	1–0	4–1	1–0	5–1	0–2		3–0	3–1			2–2	1–2		0–0
Nottingham Forest U21s	1–0	3–1	5–1	2–2		2–1	1–3		1–2	3–1	0–1	1–2	2–3		2–0	3–1			1–0	1–1	1–2
Queens Park Rangers U21s		1–4		0–3	4–5	1–0	0–1	0–1		3–1	5–2	5–5	2–6	1–1		0–4	3–1			3–2	2–1
Sheffield United U21s	1–0	2–0	2–0				0–3	0–2	3–0	2–0		2–0	3–1	2–1	1–1		2–0	3–0		1–1	
Sheffield Wednesday U21s	1–0	0–2	0–2	2–2				1–1	1–1	2–1	1–2	1–0	1–2		0–2	0–0	2–0		2–0		0–0
Watford U21s	0–2		1–1	3–3	1–1	0–2	2–0	3–1			0–5	1–2	1–3	1–2	1–0	0–1		3–3	0–2		

Updated to match(es) played on 29 April 2016. Source: U21 League 2 results
Legend: Blue = home team win; Yellow = draw; Red = away team win.

=== Knock-out stage ===
==== Semifinals ====
2 May 2016
13:00

Charlton Athletic U21s	1–2 (a.e.t.)	Sheffield United U21s
Thomas 34'		Girolamo 61' (pen.), 97'

The Valley, Charlton

3 May 2016
14:00

Huddersfield Town U21s	2–0	Millwall U21s
Booty 29'; Kane 39'	Report

PPG Canalside, Huddersfield
Attendance: 160

==== Final ====
14 May 2016
13:00

Sheffield United U21s	1–2	Huddersfield Town U21s
Whiteman 81'	Report	Boyle 80'; Hanson 85'

Bramall Lane, Sheffield
Attendance: 4,018

=== Top goalscorers ===
As of 14 May 2016

Rank	Player	Club	Goals
1	(Scotland) Alex Jakubiak	Watford U21s	16
2	(England) Joshua Umerah	Charlton Athletic U21s	15
3	(England) Rhys Healey	Cardiff City U21s	14
4	(England) Jarrod Bowen	Hull City U21s	13
4	(Germany) Jan Holldack	Brentford U21s	13
6	(England) Alex Jones	Birmingham City U21s	12
6	(Wales) George Thomas	Coventry City U21s	12
8	(England) Rekeil Pyke	Huddersfield Town U21s	11
9	(England) Femi Akinwande	Colchester United U21s	9
9	(Albania) Flo Bojaj	Huddersfield Town U21s	9
9	(Wales) Jake Charles	Huddersfield Town U21s	9
9	(Italy) Diego De Girolamo	Sheffield United U21s	9
9	(Wales) Jamie Thomas	Bolton Wanderers U21s	9
14	(England) Brandon Hanlan	Charlton Athletic U21s	8
14	(Republic of Ireland) Frank Mulhern	Leeds United U21s	8
14	(England) Alfie Pavey	Millwall U21s	8
14	(England) James Thorne	Nottingham Forest U21s	8
14	(England) Kaiyne Woolery	Bolton Wanderers U21s	8
14	(England) Jake Wright	Sheffield United U21s	8

=== Hat-tricks ===
As of 14 May 2016

Player	For	Against	Result	Date	Ref.
(Canada) Junior Hoilett	Queens Park Rangers U21s	Huddersfield Town U21s	5–5 (H)	17 August 2015	
(England) Keshi Anderson	Crystal Palace U21s	Watford U21s	6–2 (H)	24 August 2015	
(England) Keshi Anderson	Crystal Palace U21s	Barnsley U21s	0–4 (A)	15 September 2015	
(England) Alfie Pavey	Millwall U21s	Coventry City U21s	4–1 (H)	21 September 2015	
(Zimbabwe) Macauley Bonne	Colchester United U21s	Barnsley U21s	4–1 (H)	21 September 2015	
(England) Greg Luer	Hull City U21s	Queens Park Rangers U21s	2–6 (A)	9 October 2015	
(England) Ebere Eze	Millwall U21s	Queens Park Rangers U21s	0–4 (A)	20 October 2015	
(England) Kaiyne Woolery	Bolton Wanderers U21s	Leeds United U21s	3–3 (A)	26 October 2015	
(England) Joseph N'Guessan	Queens Park Rangers U21s	Crystal Palace U21s	1–3 (A)	22 December 2015	
(Scotland) Alex Jakubiak	Watford U21s	Brentford U21s	3–3 (H)	14 January 2016	
(England) Bradley Ash	Barnsley U21s	Leeds United U21s	1–4 (A)	25 January 2016	
(England) Freddie Ladapo	Crystal Palace U21s	Watford U21s	0–5 (A)	14 March 2016	
(England) Alex Jones	Birmingham City U21s	Millwall U21s	3–0 (H)	7 April 2016	
(England) Shaun Tuton	Barnsley U21s	Leeds United U21s	3–3 (H)	25 April 2016	

Note

(H) – Home; (A) – Away
^{4} – player scored 4 goals

== See also ==
- 2015–16 Professional U18 Development League
- 2015–16 FA Cup
- 2015–16 FA Youth Cup
- 2015–16 Under-21 Premier League Cup
- 2015–16 in English football
