= 2013–14 Professional U21 Development League =

The 2013–14 Professional U21 Development League (League 1 referred to as the Barclays Under 21 Premier League for sponsorship reasons) was the second season of the Professional Development League system.

There were 42 participating teams in the 2013–14 Professional U21 Development Leagues; 22 in League 1, and 20 in League 2.

League 1 had a new format, with the three groups system being abandoned in favour of a single league system with the teams finishing in the top four positions qualifying for a playoff stage.

== League 1 ==
Barclays U21 Premier League
- Season: 2013–14
- Champions: Chelsea U21s (1st Title)
- Regular Season Champions: Chelsea U21s (1st Title)
- Matches: 234 (231 RS, 3 PO)
- Goals: 777 (3.32 per match) (771 RS, 6 PO)
- Top goalscorer: (England) Lewis Baker Chelsea U21s, (England) Jordy Hiwula Manchester City EDS (12 Goals Each)
- Biggest home win: Liverpool U21s 5–0 Tottenham Hotspur U21s (7 October 2013); West Bromwich Albion U21s 5–0 Everton U21s (21 March 2014)
- Biggest away win: Blackburn Rovers U21s 0–6 Manchester City EDS (24 March 2014)
- Highest scoring: Tottenham Hotspur U21s 6–3 Manchester City EDS (19 August 2013); Newcastle United U21s 4–5 West Ham United U21s (2 September 2013)
- Longest winning run: 4 Matches Manchester United U21s
- Longest unbeaten run: 12 Matches Chelsea U21s
- Longest winless run: 11 Matches Blackburn Rovers U21s
- Longest losing run: 5 Matches Middlesbrough U21s, Newcastle United U21s
- Highest attendance: 13,203 Manchester United U21s 1–2 Chelsea U21s (14 May 2014) Playoff Final
- Lowest attendance: 37 Reading U21s 3–4 West Bromwich Albion U21s (7 October 2013)

=== League stage ===
Each team played twenty one fixtures during this stage. Having played each other once, either home or away, the top four teams in the table progressed to the knockout stage to determine the overall winner.

Starting with the 2014–15 season, the U21 Premier League was divided into two divisions. This means that the top 11 sides in the 2013–14 league stage qualify for the new Division 1, with the bottom 11 sides entering Division 2.

On 14 May, Chelsea defeated Manchester United in the final to claim the Under-21 Premier League title. The top 8 teams in the final standings of the league stage qualified for the inaugural 2014–15 edition of the Premier League International Cup.

==== National Division ====
===== Table =====
Pos	Team	Pld	W	D	L	GF	GA	GD	Pts	Qualification or relegation
1	Chelsea U21s (Q)	21	13	5	3	49	26	+23	44	Qualification for Knockout Stage
2	Liverpool U21s (Q)	21	13	3	5	55	30	+25	42	Qualification for Knockout Stage
3	Manchester United U21s (Q)	21	11	6	4	34	18	+16	39	Qualification for Knockout Stage
4	Manchester City EDS (Q)	21	12	2	7	50	28	+22	38	Qualification for Knockout Stage
5	Fulham U21s	21	11	5	5	38	30	+8	38	
6	Leicester City U21s	21	11	4	6	37	30	+7	37	
7	Southampton U21s	21	11	3	7	35	30	+5	36	
8	Sunderland U21s	21	10	5	6	34	28	+6	35	
9	West Ham United U21s	21	10	3	8	32	31	+1	33	
10	Norwich City U21s	21	9	4	8	34	29	+5	31	
11	Everton U21s	21	8	6	7	28	29	−1	30	
12	Tottenham Hotspur U21s	21	8	4	9	40	43	−3	28	
13	Bolton Wanderers U21s (R)	21	8	3	10	40	47	−7	27	Relegation to 2014–15 U21 Premier League Division 2
14	Arsenal U21s (R)	21	7	5	9	34	39	−5	26	Relegation to 2014–15 U21 Premier League Division 2
15	Aston Villa U21s (R)	21	8	2	11	35	43	−8	26	Relegation to 2014–15 U21 Premier League Division 2
16	West Bromwich Albion U21s (R)	21	8	1	12	33	39	−6	25	Relegation to 2014–15 U21 Premier League Division 2
17	Reading U21s (R)	21	7	3	11	34	40	−6	24	Relegation to 2014–15 U21 Premier League Division 2
18	Stoke City U21s (R)	21	6	4	11	26	33	−7	22	Relegation to 2014–15 U21 Premier League Division 2
19	Wolverhampton Wanderers U21s (R)	21	6	2	13	24	37	−13	20	Relegation to 2014–15 U21 Premier League Division 2
20	Middlesbrough U21s (R)	21	6	2	13	26	40	−14	20	Relegation to 2014–15 U21 Premier League Division 2
21	Newcastle United U21s (R)	21	4	5	12	35	54	−19	17	Relegation to 2014–15 U21 Premier League Division 2
22	Blackburn Rovers U21s (R)	21	3	5	13	18	47	−29	14	Relegation to 2014–15 U21 Premier League Division 2

(Q) Qualified for the phase indicated; (R) Relegated

===== Results =====
Home \ Away	ARS	AST	BLB	BOL	CHE	EVE	FUL	LEI	LIV	MNC	MNU	MID	NEW	NOR	REA	SOT	STO	SUN	TOT	WBA	WHU	WOL
Arsenal U21s		4–2			1–2			0–4	2–4	4–3	1–1					0–0		1–5		1–0	5–3	2–1
Aston Villa U21s			4–2		2–4		3–5	3–4					6–2	1–0	0–2			1–1	1–1	2–1		
Blackburn Rovers U21s	0–3					1–2				0–6	0–2	0–2	2–1	0–5	2–1		1–1		2–2			3–3
Bolton Wanderers U21s	2–1	3–2	3–0		0–5	2–3	1–3					1–1				0–2				2–2	2–0	2–3
Chelsea U21s			1–0					5–1	0–1	2–1		1–0		2–0	2–2				2–4	4–2	3–3	
Everton U21s	2–1	0–1			3–2				1–1		0–0	0–1			3–1	3–1	2–0	2–2			1–2	
Fulham U21s	0–1		3–0		1–2	2–1		1–3	2–1			1–0	2–2						5–3		1–0	4–4
Leicester City U21s			1–0	0–4		1–1			1–1	3–2	0–1				4–1	0–1	2–1	2–3				
Liverpool U21s		2–0	1–1	2–3									5–2	4–1	1–2	3–4		5–2	5–0			4–0
Manchester City EDS		3–0		4–0		3–0	1–2		0–2			4–1				1–2	1–0	6–2				3–1
Manchester United U21s		3–0		4–1	0–0		2–2		2–4	1–2		0–0		2–2			0–1	1–0			2–1	
Middlesbrough U21s	3–1	0–2						1–3	3–4				4–3		0–3	3–1	1–2		0–1			0–2
Newcastle United U21s	1–3			1–1	1–1	1–1		0–2		0–0	1–0			4–1			2–4				4–5	3–1
Norwich City U21s	2–2			5–1		2–1	0–1	1–0		0–3		3–1					4–1	3–0		0–1		
Reading U21s	2–1			4–1			1–2			1–2	2–3		4–2	1–1		3–2		1–1	2–4	3–4	0–2	
Southampton U21s		3–1	2–2		1–4		3–0				1–2		3–2	1–1				0–3	1–0			3–0
Stoke City U21s	2–2	1–3		2–6	0–3		0–0		0–1						2–0	0–1			2–0	5–1	0–1	
Sunderland U21s			3–1	1–0	2–2		1–0					3–2	2–0				1–1		3–0	1–2	1–2	
Tottenham Hotspur U21s	2–0			2–5		0–0		1–1		6–3	0–1		4–1	1–2	4–2					5–2		
West Bromwich Albion U21s			1–0			5–0	2–1	1–2	4–2	0–2	0–4	0–1	3–4			1–3						0–1
West Ham United U21s		3–0	0–1					2–2	0–2	1–1		2–1		2–0		1–0			2–3	0–3		
Wolverhampton Wanderers U21s		0–2			1–2	0–2		0–1			0–3			0–1	4–0		2–1	0–2	3–1		0–2	

Updated to match(es) played on 27 April 2014. Source: Soccerway PDL results
Legend: Blue = home team win; Yellow = draw; Red = away team win.

=== Knockout stage ===
==== Semifinals ====
1 May 2014
19:15 BST

Manchester City EDS	1–1 (a.e.t.)	Chelsea U21s
Ntcham 77'	Report	Feruz 14'
Penalties
Angeliño (penalty scored); Glendon (penalty scored); Fofana (penalty missed); Facey (penalty scored); Cole (penalty scored); Ntcham (penalty missed)	4–5	(penalty scored) Brown; (penalty scored) Christensen; (penalty scored) Baker; (penalty scored) Swift; (penalty missed) Palmer; (penalty scored) Loftus-Cheek

City of Manchester Stadium, Manchester
Attendance: 4,023
Referee: Paul Tierney

2 May 2014
19:45 BST

Liverpool U21s	0–1	Manchester United U21s
	Report	Pereira 44'

Anfield, Liverpool
Attendance: 3,203
Referee: Michael Oliver

==== Final ====
14 May 2014
19:15 BST

Manchester United U21s	1-2	Chelsea U21s
Lawrence 12'	Report	Musonda 22'; Baker 79'

Old Trafford, Manchester
Attendance: 13,203
Referee: Paul Tierney

== League 2 ==
Professional U21 Development League 2
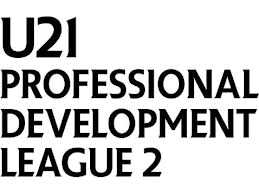
- Season: 2013–14
- Champions: Crewe Alexandra U21s (1st Title)
- Regular Season Champions: Huddersfield Town U21s (1st Title)
- Matches: 183 (180 RS, 3 PO)
- Goals: 570 (3.11 per match) (560 RS, 10 PO)
- Biggest home win: Crystal Palace U21s 6–0 Brentford U21s (8 April 2014)
- Biggest away win: Sheffield United U21s 0–5 Crewe Alexandra U21s (16 September 2013)
- Highest scoring: Charlton Athletic U21s 6–3 Brentford U21s (3 March 2014)
- Longest winless run: 9 matches Coventry City U21s
- Longest losing run: 6 matches Coventry City U21s

20 Teams competed this season. This is 3 fewer than last season. Crystal Palace joined this season after dropping their academy to Category Two Status, joining the South Division. Barnet dropped out of the league after one season, Colchester United briefly dropped to Category Three Academy and would return the next season, Wigan Athletic would also drop to Category Three Academy, while Leicester City joined the Premier League 2 as a Category One Academy after one season on July 4.

=== League stage ===
Having played each other home and away, the top two teams from each division progressed to the knockout stage to determine the overall winner.

==== North Division ====
===== Table =====
Pos	Team	Pld	W	D	L	GF	GA	GD	Pts	Qualification
1	Huddersfield Town U21s	18	13	3	2	41	21	+20	42	Knockout stage
2	Crewe Alexandra U21s	18	8	8	2	40	22	+18	32	Knockout stage
3	Sheffield United U21s	18	9	5	4	30	23	+7	32	
4	Birmingham City U21s	18	7	5	6	24	24	0	26	
5	Derby County U21s	18	7	4	7	26	24	+2	25	
6	Leeds United U21s	18	5	8	5	25	29	−4	23	
7	Barnsley U21s	18	5	5	8	29	33	−4	20	
8	Nottingham Forest U21s	18	5	5	8	24	29	−5	20	
9	Sheffield Wednesday U21s	18	3	6	9	25	42	−17	15	
10	Coventry City U21s	18	1	5	12	20	37	−17	8	

===== Results =====
Home \ Away	BAR	BIR	COV	CRE	DER	HUD	LEE	NOT	SHE	SHW
Barnsley U21s		4–1	0–1	3–3	4–1	1–3	3–0	4–1	1–3	0–1
Birmingham City U21s	4–0		2–2	0–1	1–0	0–1	2–0	2–1	1–1	3–1
Coventry City U21s	2–2	1–2		1–4	0–2	0–2	1–2	0–1	1–2	2–2
Crewe Alexandra U21s	1–1	1–1	1–1		2–1	2–4	2–2	2–1	4–0	2–0
Derby County U21s	4–2	2–0	4–2	1–1		1–1	0–1	1–1	2–1	3–1
Huddersfield Town U21s	3–0	2–4	2–2	2–2	2–1		2–1	3–2	2–1	4–1
Leeds United U21s	1–1	0–0	2–1	0–0	2–1	0–2		5–2	1–1	3–3
Nottingham Forest U21s	0–1	3–0	2–0	0–4	1–2	0–0	2–2		0–0	3–0
Sheffield United U21s	1–1	3–0	2–1	0–5	2–0	2–1	4–1	1–1		4–0
Sheffield Wednesday U21s	3–1	1–1	3–2	3–3	0–0	1–4	2–2	2–3	1–2	

Updated to match(es) played on 7 April 2014. Source: Futbol24 PDL2 results
Legend: Blue = home team win; Yellow = draw; Red = away team win.

==== South Division ====
===== Table =====
Pos	Team	Pld	W	D	L	GF	GA	GD	Pts	Qualification
1	Cardiff City U21s	18	11	3	4	29	22	+7	36	Knockout stage
2	Queens Park Rangers U21s	18	9	4	5	33	26	+7	31	Knockout stage
3	Crystal Palace U21s	18	9	3	6	37	25	+12	30	
4	Bristol City U21s	18	7	6	5	34	23	+11	27	
5	Millwall U21s	18	7	3	8	26	31	−5	24	
6	Charlton Athletic U21s	18	5	8	5	25	25	0	23	
7	Brighton & Hove Albion U21s	18	6	5	7	26	27	−1	23	
8	Swansea City U21s	18	6	4	8	23	24	−1	22	
9	Brentford U21s	18	5	3	10	25	40	−15	18	
10	Ipswich Town U21s	18	3	5	10	18	33	−15	14	

===== Results =====
Home \ Away	BRE	B&HA	BRI	CAR	CHA	CPA	IPS	MIL	QPR	SWA
Brentford U21s		2–1	2–1	2–0	4–2	1–2	1–4	2–0	1–2	0–0
Brighton & Hove Albion U21s	1–1		1–1	0–1	2–2	3–2	3–1	3–1	1–2	0–1
Bristol City U21s	2–1	5–2		2–2	4–0	2–2	3–0	4–0	3–1	0–1
Cardiff City U21s	3–1	1–0	1–0		1–0	2–1	2–2	1–0	2–2	1–0
Charlton Athletic U21s	6–3	0–0	1–1	5–2		1–1	1–0	0–0	1–1	2–1
Crystal Palace U21s	6–0	2–2	2–0	1–2	2–0		2–0	1–2	1–2	1–2
Ipswich Town U21s	1–1	1–3	1–1	0–2	0–2	1–2		2–2	1–0	2–1
Millwall U21s	3–2	2–0	2–3	2–1	1–1	1–2	3–0		4–2	2–1
Queens Park Rangers U21s	4–0	1–2	1–1	3–2	1–0	3–4	2–0	3–1		2–1
Swansea City U21s	2–1	1–2	3–1	1–3	1–1	1–3	2–2	3–0	1–1	

Updated to match(es) played on 7 April 2014. Source: Futbol24 PDL2 results
Legend: Blue = home team win; Yellow = draw; Red = away team win.

=== Knockout stage ===
==== Semifinals ====
23 April 2014
19:00

Huddersfield Town U21s	2–3	Queens Park Rangers U21s
Bunn 17'; Charles 90'	Report	Johnson 6', 45'; Mitchell 38'

John Smith's Stadium, Huddersfield
Referee: Duncan Street

23 April 2014
19:00

Cardiff City U21s	0–4	Crewe Alexandra U21s
	Report	Leitch-Smith 26'; Clayton 40'; Baillie 80'; Melling 90'

Cardiff City Stadium, Cardiff
Attendance: 628
Referee: Timothy Wood

==== Final ====
30 April 2014
19:00

Queens Park Rangers U21s	0–1	Crewe Alexandra U21s
	Report	Clayton 46'

Loftus Road, London
Attendance: 1,942
Referee: Adam Crysell

== See also ==
- 2013–14 Professional U18 Development League
- 2013–14 FA Cup
- 2013–14 FA Youth Cup
- 2013–14 Under-21 Premier League Cup
- 2013–14 in English football
