= Josh Okpolokpo =

Irish footballer (born 2003)

Personal information
- Full name: Joshua Melive Oghenerukewe Okpolokpo
- Date of birth: 31 March 2003 (age 23)
- Place of birth: Dublin, Ireland
- Height: 1.93 m (6 ft 4 in)
- Position: Centre back

Team information
- Current team: SJK
- Number: 24

Youth career
- –2019: Ipswich Town
- 2019–2020: Huddersfield Town

Senior career*
Years	Team	Apps	(Gls)
2022–2023	Leiston		
2022–2023	→ Gorleston (loan)		
2023	Sudbury		
2023–2024	Dulwich Hamlet		
2024	Triglav Kranj	8	(0)
2024–2025	Concordia Chiajna	7	(0)
2025–	SJK	1	(0)
2025	SJK II	4	(0)
2026	→ FC Džiugas (loan)	13	(1)
- * Club domestic league appearances and goals as of 23 July 2026

Joshua Melive Oghenerukewe Okpolokpo (born 31 March 2003) is an Irish professional footballer who plays as a centre back for Veikkausliiga club SJK Seinäjoki.

== Career ==
Okpolokpo started his senior career in English lower levels.

In February 2024, he signed with 2. SNL club Triglav Kranj in Slovenia.

In September 2024, Okpolokpo moved to Romania and signed with Concordia Chiajna in Liga II.

On 18 July 2025, he joined Finnish Veikkausliiga club SJK Seinäjoki. One month later, he debuted in Veikkausliiga, in a 4–0 away win against Jaro.
