= 2013–14 FA Youth Cup =

2013-14 FA Youth Cup
Tournament details
- Teams: 453

Final positions
- Champions: Chelsea (5th Title)
- Runners-up: Fulham (1st Runner Up Finish)

Tournament statistics
- Top goal scorer(s): (France) Moussa Dembele, Fulham (9 Goals)

The 2013–14 FA Youth Cup was the 62nd edition of the FA Youth Cup.

The competition consisted of several rounds and was preceded by a qualifying competition, starting with the preliminary round which is followed by 3 qualifying rounds for non-League teams. Football League teams enter the draw thereafter, with League One and League Two teams entered at the first round Proper, and Premier League and Championship teams entered at the third round proper. The competition was won by Chelsea who defeated Fulham 7–6 on aggregate.

== Calendar ==
| Round | Matches played from | Matches | Clubs |
|---|---|---|---|
| Preliminary round | 9 September 2013 | 67 | 453 → 386 |
| First round qualifying | 18 September 2013 | 148 | 386 → 238 |
| Second round qualifying | 7 October 2013 | 72 | 238 → 166 |
| Third round qualifying | 16 October 2013 | 37 | 166 → 129 |
| First round | 21 October 2013 | 42 | 129 → 86 |
| Second round | 13 November 2013 | 21 | 86 → 64 |
| Third round | 2 December 2013 | 32 | 64 → 32 |
| Fourth round | 6 January 2014 | 16 | 32 → 16 |
| Fifth round | 12 February 2014 | 8 | 16 → 8 |
| Quarter-finals | 10 March 2014 | 4 | 8 → 4 |
| Semi-finals (two legs) | 1 April 2014 | 4 | 4 → 2 |
| Final (two legs) | To be confirmed | 2 | 2 → 1 |

== Qualifying rounds ==
=== Preliminary round ===
| Tie no | Home team | Score | Away team | Attendance |
|---|---|---|---|---|
| 1 | Gateshead | 5 – 0 | Ryton & Crawcrook Albion | 104 |
| 2 | Formby | W/O | Ashton Town | N/A |
| 3 | AFC Fylde | 4 – 1 | Skelmersdale United | 58 |
| 4 | Northwich Victoria | W/O | Witton Albion | N/A |
| 5 | Buxton | W/O | Abbey Hey | N/A |
| 6 | New Mills | 3 – 4 | Stalybridge Celtic | 69 |
| 7 | Hemsworth Miners Welfare | 1 – 3 | Westella Hanson | 56 |
| 8 | FC Halifax Town | 5 – 2 | Thackley | 130 |
| 9 | Hallam | 2 – 3 | Harrogate Town | 47 |
| 10 | Worksop Town | 9 – 0 | Kinsley Boys | 58 |
| 11 | St Andrews | 2 – 0 | Matlock Town | 35 |
| 12 | Ilkeston | 8 – 0 | Lincoln United | 93 |
| 13 | Hinckley United | 8 – 0 | Spalding United | 35 |
| 14 | Dunkirk | 2 – 4 | Lincoln City | 36 |
| 15 | Pelsall Villa | 2 – 5 | Coventry Sphinx | 37 |
| 16 | Ellesmere Rangers | 5 – 0 | Southam United | 30 |
| 17 | Wednesfield | 0 – 3 | AFC Telford United | 35 |
| 18 | Hednesford Town | 2 – 1 | Racing Club Warwick | 60 |
| 19 | Rugby Town | 3 – 2† | Chasetown | 52 |
| 20 | Stratford Town | 1 – 2 | Kidderminster Harriers | 46 |
| 21 | Gorleston | 2 – 3 | Dereham Town | 60 |
| 22 | Brantham Athletic | 1 – 8 | Cambridge United | 45 |
| 23 | Cornard United | 2 – 1 | Walsham Le Willows | 28 |
| 24 | Leiston | W/O | Fakenham Town | N/A |
| 25 | Brackley Town | 1 – 2 | Barton Rovers | 37 |
| 26 | AFC Kempston Rovers | W/O | Kettering Town | N/A |
| 27 | Stotfold | 4 – 0 | Peterborough Northern Star | 42 |
| 28 | Hoddesdon Town | 2 – 0 | Billericay Town | 51 |
| 29 | Grays Athletic | 1 – 0 | Tilbury | 60 |
| 30 | Royston Town | 2 – 4 | Chelmsford City | 66 |
| 31 | Colney Heath | 1 – 4 | Stanway Rovers | 20 |
| 32 | Clapton | 0 – 2 | AFC Hornchurch | 30 |
| 33 | Canvey Island | 3 – 2† | Witham Town | 91 |
| 34 | Hullbridge Sports | 0 – 3 | Hitchin Town | 43 |

| Tie no | Home team | Score | Away team | Attendance |
|---|---|---|---|---|
| 35 | Waltham Abbey | 1 – 3 | Heybridge Swifts | 49 |
| 36 | FC Clacton | 2 – 1 | Concord Rangers | 65 |
| 37 | Redbridge | 0 – 2 | Braintree Town | 21 |
| 38 | Corinthian Casuals | 0 – 7 | Hampton and Richmond Borough | |
| 39 | Northwood | 2 – 1† | Enfield Town | 45 |
| 40 | Faversham Town | 3 – 0 | Chatham Town | 53 |
| 41 | Dover Athletic | 0 – 1 | Corinthian | |
| 42 | Tonbridge Angles | 7 – 2 | Lordswood | 94 |
| 43 | Whitstable Town | 2 – 5 | Maidstone United | 56 |
| 44 | Crowborough Athletic | 3 – 2 | Croydon | 31 |
| 45 | East Grinstead Town | 1 – 0 | Erith and Belvedere | 46 |
| 46 | Hastings United | 6 – 7† | Chipstead | 90 |
| 47 | Shoreham | 7 – 3† | Pagham | 33 |
| 48 | Bognor Regis Town | 4 – 2 | Kingstonian | |
| 49 | Peacehaven & Telscombe | 5 – 0 | Walton and Hersham | 25 |
| 50 | Lancing | 4 – 3 | Molesey | 50 |
| 51 | Newhaven | 0 – 1 | Dorking | 40 |
| 52 | Crawley Down Gatwick | 2 – 3 | Woking | 84 |
| 53 | Worthing | 6 – 0 | Littlehampton Town | 100 |
| 54 | Thame United | 10 – 0 | Fleet Spurs | 54 |
| 55 | Thatcham Town | 2 – 0 | Burnham | 32 |
| 56 | Banbury United | 2 – 4 | Marlow | 42 |
| 57 | Hartley Wintney | 3 – 0 | Flackwell Heath | 51 |
| 58 | Windsor | 1 – 9 | Ascot United | 53 |
| 59 | Cove | 0 – 2 | Sandhurst Town | 54 |
| 60 | Kidlington | 2 – 1 | Fleet Town | 31 |
| 61 | Salisbury City | 1 – 1 | Moneyfields | 55 |
Moneyfields advance 4–2 on penalties.
| 62 | Eastleigh | 3 – 1 | Hamworthy United | |
| 63 | Cirencester Town | 6 – 0 | Almondsbury UWE | 71 |
| 64 | Weston Super Mare | 6 – 0 | Wells City | 39 |
| 65 | Cheltenham Saracens | 4 – 4 | Hengrove Athletic | 47 |
Cheltenham Saracens advance 3–1 on penalties.
| 66 | Ashton & Backwell United | 0 – 5 | Forest Green Rovers | 58 |
| 67 | Taunton Town | 1 – 3 | Merthyr Town | 139 |

† - After extra time

=== First qualifying round ===
| Tie no | Home team | Score | Away team | Attendance |
|---|---|---|---|---|
| 1 | Newton Aycliffe | 0 – 4 | Consett | 14 |
| 2 | Scarborough Athletic | 0 – 8 | Gateshead | |
| 3 | Newcastle Benfield | 4 – 3 | Chester Le Street Town | 103 |
| 4 | Alsager Town | 1 – 3 | Ashton Town | 83 |
| 5 | Southport | 0 – 2 | Stalybridge Celtic | 72 |
| 6 | Nelson | 7 – 2 | Lancaster City | 37 |
| 7 | Nantwich Town | 1 – 8 | Abbey Hey | 85 |
| 8 | Runcorn Town | 4 – 5 | Altrincham | 65 |
| 9 | AFC Fylde | 3 – 0 | Witton Albion | 122 |
| 10 | AFC Blackpool | 1 – 6 | Chester | 102 |
| 11 | Marine | 1 – 1 | Macclesfield Town | 81 |
Macclesfield Town advance 4–3 on penalties.
| 12 | Vauxhall Motors | 3 – 2 | Bootle | 103 |
| 13 | Wrexham | 3 – 0 | Hyde | 67 |
| 14 | Ashton Athletic | 0 – 3 | Prescott Cables | 82 |
| 15 | Glossop North End | 0 – 4 | Runcorn Linnets | 75 |
| 16 | Warrington Town | 4 – 1 | Curzon Ashton | 70 |
| 17 | Ossett Town | 0 – 4 | Sheffield | 85 |
| 18 | Silsden | 0 – 2 | Westella Hanson | 16 |
| 19 | Grimsby Town | 7 – 0 | North Ferriby United | |
| 20 | Staveley Miners Welfare | 4 – 0 | Farsley | 102 |
| 21 | Bottesford Town | 2 – 6 | Selby Town | 57 |
| 22 | Harrogate Town | 3 – 2 | FC Halifax Town | 173 |
| 23 | Worksop Town | 4 – 1 | Ossett Albion | 73 |
| 24 | Brighouse Town | 1 – 3 | Guiseley | 65 |
First match at Guiseley abandoned after 90 mins at 2-2.
| 25 | Yorkshire Amateur | W/O | Hall Road Rangers | N/A |
Walkover for Hall Road Rangers - Yorkshire Amateur withdrawn.
| 26 | Stocksbridge Park Steels | 2 – 3 | Nostell MW | 41 |
| 27 | Teversal | 0 – 5 | St Andrews | 53 |
| 28 | Deeping Rangers | 0 – 6 | Ilkeston | 54 |
| 29 | Holwell Sports | 0 – 4 | Boston United | 48 |
| 30 | Lincoln City | 7 – 1 | Basford United | 119 |
| 31 | Hinckley United | W/O | Ibstock United | N/A |
| 32 | Blaby & Whetstone Athletic | 1 – 4 | Mickleover Sports | 33 |
| 33 | Lutterworth Athletic | 2 – 1 | Retford United | 54 |
| 34 | Gresley | W/O | Oadby Town | N/A |
| 35 | Stapenhill | 9 – 0 | Stamford | 21 |
| 36 | Rugby Town | 3 – 0 | AFC Telford United | 35 |
| 37 | Ellesmere Rangers | 2 – 4 | Worcester City | 25 |
| 38 | Tipton Town | 2 – 1 | Sutton Coldfield Town | 39 |
| 39 | Boldmere St Michaels | 2 – 1 | Stourport Swifts | 47 |
| 40 | Leamington | W/O | Eccleshall | N/A |
| 41 | Hereford United | 2 – 0 | Newcastle Town | 125 |
| 42 | Solihull Moors | 5 – 0 | Lye Town | 60 |
| 43 | Nuneaton Town | 4 – 0 | Dudley Sports | 85 |
| 44 | Nuneaton Griff | W/O | Malvern Town | N/A |
| 45 | Kidderminster Harriers | 5 – 3 | Romulus | |
| 46 | Coventry Sphinx | 1 – 3 | Atherstone Town | 51 |
| 47 | Halesowen Town | 3 – 0 | Coleshill Town | 37 |
| 48 | Walsall Wood | W/O | Stourbridge | N/A |
| 49 | Pegasus Juniors | 5 - 4† | Hednesford Town | 36 |
| 50 | Woodbridge Town | 4 – 0 | Wroxham | 52 |
| 51 | Stowmarket Town | 0 – 4 | Newmarket Town | 26 |
| 52 | Haverhill Rovers | 2 – 6 | Cornard United | 54 |
| 53 | Needham Market | 2 – 5 | Cambridge United | 128 |
| 54 | Swaffham Town | 2 – 5† | Dereham Town | 81 |
| 55 | Long Melford | 3 – 2† | Ipswich Wanderers | 52 |
| 56 | Felixstowe & Walton United | 1 – 3 | Bury Town | 32 |
| 57 | Norwich United | 0 – 2 | Fakenham Town | 51 |
| 58 | AFC Sudbury | 3 – 3 | Whitton United | 71 |
Whitton United advance 4–2 on penalties.
| 59 | Lowestoft Town | 2 – 0 | Hadleigh United | 73 |
| 60 | Histon | 3 – 1 | Soham Town Rangers | 128 |
| 61 | Stewarts & Lloyds Corby | 0 – 5 | Barton Rovers | 33 |
| 62 | Corby Town | 4 – 3† | AFC Kempston Rovers | 40 |
| 63 | St Neots Town | 2 – 4† | Cogenhoe United | 64 |
| 64 | AFC Dunstable | W/O | Rushden & Higham United | N/A |
| 65 | Stotfold | 12 – 0 | Yaxley | 48 |
| 66 | St Ives Town | 1 – 4 | Leighton Town | 91 |
| 67 | AFC Rushden & Diamonds | 4 – 0 | Bugbrooke St Michaels | 94 |
| 68 | Bedford Town | 1 – 3 | Wellingborough Town | 64 |
| 69 | Luton Town | 6 – 0 | Rothwell Corinthians | 100 |
| 70 | Bishop's Stortford | 3 – 0 | Romford | 105 |
| 71 | Stanway Rovers | 0 – 1 | Chelmsford City | 62 |
| 72 | Bowers & Pitsea | 3 – 2 | Halstead Town | 41 |
| 73 | East Thurrock United | 2 – 0 | Braintree Town | 99 |
| 74 | Tower Hamlets | 2 – 6 | Boreham Wood | 40 |

| Tie no | Home team | Score | Away team | Attendance |
|---|---|---|---|---|
| 75 | Sawbridgeworth Town | 3 – 3 | Cheshunt | 100 |
Cheshunt advance 4–2 on penalties.
| 76 | Canvey Island | 1 – 1 | Barking | 108 |
Canvey Island advance 4–3 on penalties.
| 77 | Potters Bar Town | 5 – 4 | Great Wakering Rovers | 33 |
| 78 | Ware | 0 – 4 | Barnet | 87 |
| 79 | Concord Rangers | 3 – 2 | Heybridge Swifts | 54 |
| 80 | Grays Athletic | 3 – 2 | Hoddesdon Town | 32 |
| 81 | St Albans City | 2 – 3 | Brentwood Town | 77 |
| 82 | Thurrock | W/O | Burnham Ramblers | N/A |
| 83 | Hitchin Town | 0 – 1 | AFC Hornchurch | 49 |
| 84 | Staines Town | 5 – 4 | Hampton & Richmond Borough | 77 |
| 85 | Harefield United | 2 – 1† | Northwood | 30 |
| 86 | Wingate & Finchley | 2 – 2† | Wealdstone | 71 |
Wingate & Finchley advance 7–6 on penalties.
| 87 | Kings Langley | 2 – 1 | North Greenford United | 30 |
| 88 | Berkhamsted | 3 – 1 | Ashford Town (Middx) | 57 |
| 89 | Metropolitan Police | 3 – 2 | Oxhey Jets | |
| 90 | Bedfont Sports | 4 – 6 | Uxbridge | 47 |
| 91 | Leverstock Green | 0 – 1 | Enfield 1983 | 42 |
| 92 | Cockfosters | 4 – 3 | Hayes & Yeading United | 47 |
| 93 | Fisher | 0 – 6 | Dulwich Hamlet | 83 |
| 94 | Crowborough Athletic | 2 – 0 | Tonbridge Angels | 65 |
| 95 | Corinthian | 7 – 0 | Eastbourne Town | 64 |
| 96 | Thamesmead Town | 5 – 0 | Erith Town | 63 |
| 97 | Bromley | 2 – 1 | Eastbourne United | 95 |
| 98 | Folkestone Invicta | 1 – 4 | Colliers Wood United | 61 |
| 99 | Welling United | 3 – 4 | Sutton United | 81 |
| 100 | Sittingbourne | 1 – 0 | Holmesdale | 78 |
| 101 | Margate | 0 – 7 | Dartford | 57 |
| 102 | Ramsgate | 1 – 1† | Eastbourne Borough | 65 |
Eastbourne Borough advance 5–4 on penalties.
| 103 | East Grinstead Town | 0 – 1 | Sevenoaks Town | 43 |
| 104 | Faversham Town | 0 – 4 | Chipstead | 45 |
| 105 | Ebbsfleet United | W/O | Cray Wanderers | N/A |
| 106 | Tooting & Mitcham United | 1 – 4 | VCD Athletic | 41 |
| 107 | Carshalton Athletic | 1 – 3 | Maidstone Athletic | 79 |
| 108 | Godalming Town | 3 – 3 | Havant & Waterlooville | 62 |
Havant & Waterlooville advance 5–4 on penalties.
| 109 | Camberley Town | 3 – 0 | Redhill | 32 |
| 110 | Westfield | 0 – 6 | Horsham | 39 |
| 111 | Guildford City | 3 – 1 | Farnham Town | 40 |
| 112 | Woking | 4 – 1 | South Park | 45 |
| 113 | Arundel | 0 – 6 | Horley Town | 42 |
| 114 | Lancing | 2 – 0 | Knaphill | 52 |
| 115 | Peacehaven & Telscombe | 3 – 3 | Whyteleafe | 35 |
Peacehaven & Telscombe advance 4–2 on penalties.
| 116 | Three Bridges | 1 – 2 | Burgess Hill Town | 73 |
| 117 | Leatherhead | 1 – 3 | Worthing | 68 |
| 118 | Dorking | 1 – 2 | Shoreham | |
| 119 | Lewes | 3 – 2 | Bognor Regis Town | 54 |
| 120 | Binfield | 3 – 0 | Basingstoke Town | 20 |
| 121 | Abingdon United | 3 – 0 | Highmoor Ibis | 30 |
| 122 | Newport Pagnell Town | 0 – 1 | Farnborough | 62 |
| 123 | Bracknell Town | 2 – 5 | Aylesbury | 26 |
| 124 | Sandhurst Town | 1 – 9 | Maidenhead United | 35 |
| 125 | Slough Town | 2 – 3 | Buckingham Athletic | 69 |
| 126 | Hartley Wintney | 2 – 1† | Chesham United | 30 |
| 127 | Marlow | W/O | Reading Town | N/A |
| 128 | Oxford City | 2 – 1 | Alton Town | 25 |
| 129 | Didcot Town | 4 – 0 | Kidlington | 54 |
| 130 | Ascot United | 2 – 6 | Thame United | 61 |
| 131 | Aldershot Town | 8 – 0 | Thatcham Town | 139 |
| 132 | Eastleigh | 2 – 3 | Wimborne Town | 96 |
| 133 | Moneyfields | 2 – 0 | Westbury United | 60 |
| 134 | Chippenham Town | 0 – 3 | AFC Bournemouth | 66 |
| 135 | AFC Totton | 6 – 0 | Gillingham Town | 79 |
| 136 | Dorchester Town | 2 – 1 | AFC Portchester | 69 |
| 137 | Christchurch | 2 – 1 | Poole Town | 78 |
| 138 | Petersfield Town | 1 – 4 | Chichester City | 49 |
| 139 | Larkhall Athletic | 4 – 3 | Gloucester City | 30 |
| 140 | Paulton Rovers | 2 – 3 | Cirencester Town | 54 |
| 141 | Bitton | W/O | Tiverton Town | N/A |
| 142 | Lydney Town | W/O | Bath City | N/A |
| 143 | Elmore | 2 – 3 | Odd Down | 11 |
| 144 | Cheltenham Saracens | 0 – 1 | Weston Super Mare | 39 |
| 145 | Forest Green Rovers | 2 – 1 | Clevedon Town | 119 |
| 146 | Bridgwater Town | 0 – 3 | Yate Town | 97 |
| 147 | Bishop Sutton | W/O | Merthyr Town | N/A |
| 148 | Mangotsfield United | 1 – 2 | Bristol Academy | 50 |

† - After extra time

=== Second qualifying round ===
| Tie no | Home team | Score | Away team | Attendance |
|---|---|---|---|---|
| 1 | Guiseley | 1 – 1 | Hall Road Rangers | 67 |
Guiseley advance 4–3 on penalties.
| 2 | Consett | 5 – 1 | Newcastle Benfield | 49 |
| 3 | Nelson | 0 – 4 | Gateshead | 45 |
| 4 | Runcorn Linnets | 1 – 2 | Stalybridge Celtic | 104 |
| 5 | Westella Hanson | 3 – 1 | Ashton Town | 24 |
| 6 | Wrexham | 6 – 0 | AFC Fylde | 117 |
| 7 | Sheffield | 0 – 1 | Macclesfield Town | 102 |
| 8 | Prescot Cables | 1 – 3 | Chester | 160 |
| 9 | Staveley Miners Welfare | 1 – 2 | Nostell Miners Welfare | 110 |
| 10 | Grimsby Town | 3 – 1 | Harrogate Town | |
| 11 | Abbey Hey | 3 – 3 | Selby Town | |
Selby Town advance 5–4 on penalties.
| 12 | Altrincham | 4 – 1 | Vauxhall Motors | 142 |
| 13 | Warrington Town | 7 – 2 | Worksop Town | 78 |
| 14 | Boston United | 1 – 0 | Lincoln City | 363 |
| 15 | Ilkeston | 3 – 3 | St Andrews | 83 |
Ilkeston advance 5–4 on penalties.
| 16 | Lutterworth Athletic | W/O | Hinckley United | N/A |
Walkover for Lutterworth Athletic - Hinckley United removed.
| 17 | Gresley | 1 – 4 | Mickleover Sports | 72 |
| 18 | Stapenhill | 0 – 4 | Histon | 44 |
| 19 | Halesowen Town | 5 – 0 | Eccleshall | 59 |
| 20 | Stourbridge | 1 – 3 | Hereford United | 114 |
| 21 | Solihull Moors | 3 – 4† | Rugby Town | 61 |
| 22 | Kidderminster Harriers | 2 – 3 | Atherstone Town | |
| 23 | Nuneaton Town | 5 – 0 | Nuneaton Griff | |
| 24 | Worcester City | 2 – 0 | Boldmere St Michaels | 43 |
| 25 | Tipton Town | 2 – 3 | Pegasus Juniors | 61 |
| 26 | Cornard United | 1 – 6 | Cambridge United | 38 |
| 27 | Lowestoft Town | 0 – 2† | Woodbridge Town | 85 |
| 28 | Bury Town | 1 – 0† | Dereham Town | 42 |
| 29 | Fakenham Town | 3 – 4† | Long Melford | 45 |
| 30 | Whitton United | 6 – 1 | Newmarket Town | 67 |
| 31 | Cogenhoe United | 5 – 1 | Rushden & Higham United | 33 |
| 32 | Barnet | 0 – 3 | Barton Rovers | 344 |
| 33 | AFC Rushden & Diamonds | 0 – 4 | Stotfold | 91 |
| 34 | Wellingborough Town | 2 – 3† | Leighton Town | 53 |
| 35 | Luton Town | 5 – 1 | Corby Town | 138 |
| 36 | Thurrock | 4 – 2 | Boreham Wood | 53 |
| 37 | AFC Hornchurch | 1 – 0 | Cheshunt | 112 |

| Tie no | Home team | Score | Away team | Attendance |
|---|---|---|---|---|
| 38 | Canvey Island | 3 – 2 | Bishop's Stortford | 112 |
| 39 | Grays Athletic | 6 – 3† | Bowers & Pitsea | 31 |
| 40 | Potters Bar Town | 3 – 1 | Concord Rangers | 40 |
| 41 | Chelmsford City | 5 – 0 | East Thurrock United | 145 |
| 42 | Brentwood Town | 4 – 2† | Enfield 1893 | 67 |
| 43 | Wingate & Finchley | 4 – 0 | Kings Langley | 73 |
| 44 | Thamesmead Town | 3 – 2 | Staines Town | 20 |
| 45 | Uxbridge | 3 – 2 | Berkhamsted | 44 |
| 46 | Cockfosters | 1 – 4 | Harefield United | 65 |
| 47 | Dulwich Hamlet | 4 – 2 | Metropolitan Police | 92 |
| 48 | Crowborough Athletic | 3 – 4 | Colliers Wood United | 78 |
| 49 | Sutton United | 2 – 0 | Eastbourne Borough | 109 |
| 50 | Maidstone United | 2 – 0 | Corinthian | 233 |
| 51 | Chipstead | 4 – 1 | Sevenoaks Town | |
| 52 | Sittingbourne | 0 – 5 | Dartford | 83 |
| 53 | Cray Wanderers | 1 – 0 | Bromley | 44 |
| 54 | VCD Athletic | 1 – 0 | Horsham | 63 |
| 55 | Woking | 1 – 0 | Peacehaven & Telscombe | |
| 56 | Lewes | 0 – 3 | Havant & Waterlooville | 76 |
| 57 | Worthing | 0 – 3 | Burgess Hill Town | |
| 58 | Horley Town | 1 – 0 | Lancing | |
| 59 | Shoreham | 1 – 3 | Camberley Town | 43 |
| 60 | Didcot Town | 4 – 3† | Binfield | 49 |
| 61 | Wimborne Town | 0 – 2 | Guildford City | 63 |
| 62 | Marlow | 0 – 2 | Aylesbury | 62 |
| 63 | Aldershot Town | 2 – 0 | Buckingham Athletic | 102 |
| 64 | Oxford City | 1 – 3 | Maidenhead United | |
| 65 | AFC Bournemouth | 2 – 1 | Chichester City | 88 |
| 66 | Moneyfields | 1 – 0 | Dorchester Town | 70 |
| 67 | Abingdon United | 1 – 5 | AFC Totton | 45 |
| 68 | Farnborough | 2 – 1 | Hartley Wintney | 71 |
| 69 | Thame United | 0 – 3 | Christchurch | 42 |
| 70 | Tiverton Town | 3 – 2 | Bath City | 87 |
| 71 | Bristol Academy | 8 – 0 | Larkhall Athletic | 33 |
| 72 | Forest Green Rovers | 5 – 0 | Odd Down | |
| 73 | Yate Town | 0 – 1 | Weston Super Mare | 63 |
| 74 | Merthyr Town | 2 – 5 | Cirencester Town | 39 |
Played at Cirencester Town.

† - After extra time

=== Third qualifying round ===
| Tie no | Home team | Score | Away team | Attendance |
|---|---|---|---|---|
| 1 | Warrington Town | 2 – 1 | Mickleover Sports | 88 |
| 2 | Stalybridge Celtic | 0 – 3 | Chester | |
| 3 | Altrincham | 10 – 3 | Nostell MW | 139 |
| 4 | Consett | 2 – 6 | Gateshead | 83 |
| 5 | Macclesfield Town | 2 – 1 | Westella Hanson | 126 |
| 6 | Wrexham | 3 – 0 | Selby Town | 92 |
| 7 | Grimsby Town | 0 – 2† | Guiseley | |
| 8 | Histon | 5 – 1 | Cogenhoe United | 103 |
| 9 | Lutterworth Athletic | 1 – 2 | Halesowen Town | |
| 10 | Boston United | 3 – 1 | Pegasus Juniors | 176 |
| 11 | Atherstone Town | 2 – 5 | Hereford United | 51 |
| 12 | Worcester City | 1 – 0 | Rugby Town | 35 |
| 13 | Ilkeston | 2 – 0 | Nuneaton Town | 85 |
| 14 | Luton Town | 3 – 0 | Leighton Town | 148 |
| 15 | Stotfold | 1 – 1† | Cambridge United | 91 |
Cambridge United advance 3–1 on penalties.
| 16 | Long Melford | 2 – 2† | Bury Town | 77 |
Bury Town advance 9–8 on penalties.
| 17 | Whitton United | 0 – 5 | Woodbridge Town | 146 |
| 18 | Canvey Island | 0 – 1 | Dulwich Hamlet | 86 |
| 19 | AFC Hornchurch | 1 – 2 | Grays Athletic | 72 |

| Tie no | Home team | Score | Away team | Attendance |
|---|---|---|---|---|
| 20 | Barton Rovers | 3 – 1 | Harefield United | 83 |
| 21 | Brentwood Town | 4 – 2 | Potters Bar Town | 122 |
| 22 | Uxbridge | 2 – 1 | Chelmsford City | 63 |
| 23 | Thurrock | 0 – 1 | Wingate & Finchley | 101 |
| 24 | Woking | 5 – 3 | Cray Wanderers | |
| 25 | Dartford | 4 – 2 | Thamesmead Town | 118 |
| 26 | Maidstone United | 1 – 1† | Sutton United | 222 |
Maidstone United advance 6–5 on penalties.
| 27 | Chipstead | 2 – 2† | Colliers Wood | |
Chipstead advance 4–2 on penalties.
| 28 | Farnborough | 0 – 2 | Christchurch | 51 |
| 29 | Horley Town | 2 – 1 | Aylesbury | |
| 30 | AFC Totton | 1 – 0 | Aldershot Town | 111 |
| 31 | Havant & Waterlooville | 1 – 7 | Burgess Hill Town | 76 |
| 32 | Guildford City | 1 – 3 | Camberley Town | 65 |
| 33 | Didcot Town | 2 – 1 | AFC Bournemouth | 112 |
| 34 | Maidenhead United | 0 – 0† | VCD Athletic | |
VCD Athletic advance 4–2 on penalties.
| 35 | Forest Green Rovers | 3 – 1 | Cirencester Town | 164 |
| 36 | Moneyfields | 0 – 0† | Weston Super Mare | 50 |
Moneyfields advance 3–1 on penalties.
| 37 | Bristol Academy | 4 – 1 | Tiverton Town | 46 |

† - After extra time

== First round proper ==
| Tie no | Home team | Score | Away team | Attendance |
|---|---|---|---|---|
| 1 | Altrincham | 2 – 1 | Wrexham | 135 |
| 2 | Chester | 1 – 1† | Chesterfield | 399 |
Chesterfield advance 5–4 on penalties.
| 3 | Tranmere Rovers | 4 – 4† | Gateshead | 304 |
Gateshead advance 5–4 on penalties.
| 4 | Preston North End | 6 – 1 | Mansfield Town | 522 |
| 5 | Bury | 6 – 2 | Guiseley | 164 |
| 6 | Accrington Stanley | 3 - 1 | Carlisle United | 172 |
| 7 | Macclesfield Town | 0 – 3 | York City | 130 |
| 8 | Morecambe | 3 – 1 | Hartlepool United | 76 |
| 9 | Scunthorpe United | 0 – 2 | Bradford City | 215 |
| 10 | Warrington Town | 2 – 6 | Rochdale | 165 |
| 11 | Oldham Athletic | 2 – 2† | Sheffield United | 284 |
Sheffield United advance 4–3 on penalties.
| 12 | Rotherham United | 1 – 1† | Fleetwood Town | 590 |
Rotherham United advance 7–6 on penalties.
| 13 | Notts County | 1 – 2† | Peterborough United | 268 |
| 14 | Ilkeston | 7 – 4† | Northampton Town | 110 |
| 15 | Hereford United | 3 – 0 | MK Dons | 182 |
| 16 | Walsall | 2 – 0 | Port Vale | 145 |
| 17 | Boston United | 0 – 4 | Luton Town | 212 |
| 18 | Wolverhampton Wanderers | 5 - 0 | Burton Albion | 319 |
| 19 | Worcester City | 1 – 0 | Halesowen Town | 90 |
| 20 | Crewe Alexandra | 2 – 0 | Coventry City | 407 |
| 21 | Histon | 1 - 2 | Shrewsbury Town | 247 |

| Tie no | Home team | Score | Away team | Attendance |
|---|---|---|---|---|
| 22 | Barton Rovers | 1 – 0 | Stevenage | 215 |
| 23 | Chipstead | 2 – 1 | Horley Town | 90 |
| 24 | Maidstone United | 2 – 3 | Southend United | 354 |
| 25 | AFC Totton | 0 – 3 | Leyton Orient | 202 |
| 26 | Dulwich Hamlet | 4 – 1 | Brentwood Town | 60 |
| 27 | Gillingham | 1 – 3 | Brentford | 224 |
| 28 | Dartford | 6 – 1 | Christchurch | 108 |
| 29 | Bury Town | 0 - 3 | Dagenham & Redbridge | 102 |
Dagenham & Redbridge removed for playing an ineligible player.
| 30 | Wingate & Finchley | 3 – 4 | Burgess Hill Town | 54 |
| 31 | Crawley Town | 5 - 0 | Woodbridge Town | 300 |
| 32 | Cambridge United | 2 – 3 | Woking | 84 |
| 33 | AFC Wimbledon | 1 – 4 | Colchester United | 212 |
| 34 | Grays Athletic | 5 – 2 | Uxbridge | 41 |
| 35 | Cheltenham Town | 7 – 1 | VCD Athletic | 130 |
| 36 | Forest Green Rovers | 1 - 2 | Torquay United | 165 |
| 37 | Exeter City | 3 – 4 | Swindon Town | 208 |
| 38 | Didcot Town | 0 - 3 | Oxford United | 291 |
| 39 | Bristol City | 3 – 0 | Newport County | 270 |
| 40 | Portsmouth | 12 – 0 | Moneyfields | 948 |
| 41 | Camberley Town | 1 - 2 | Bristol Rovers | 70 |
| 42 | Plymouth Argyle | 4 - 1 | Bristol Academy | 316 |

† - After extra time

== Second round proper ==
| Tie no | Home team | Score | Away team | Attendance |
|---|---|---|---|---|
| 1 | Sheffield United | 9 – 0 | Worcester City | 330 |
| 2 | Preston North End | 5 – 0 | York City | 611 |
| 3 | Morecambe | 1 – 3 | Bradford City | 146 |
| 4 | Ilkeston | 0 – 1 | Accrington Stanley | 228 |
| 5 | Rochdale | 1 – 2 | Crewe Alexandra | 262 |
| 6 | Wolverhampton Wanderers | 1 – 2 | Peterborough United | 298 |
| 7 | Walsall | 4 – 0 | Altrincham | 179 |
| 8 | Chesterfield | 0 – 1 | Hereford United | 162 |
| 9 | Gateshead | 1 – 2 | Luton Town | 243 |
| 10 | Rotherham United | 3 – 2 | Bury | 290 |
| 11 | Grays Athletic | 2 – 3 | Dartford | 104 |

| Tie no | Home team | Score | Away team | Attendance |
|---|---|---|---|---|
| 12 | Shrewsbury Town | 0 – 1 | Bristol Rovers | 196 |
| 13 | Southend United | 1 – 3 | Oxford United | 296 |
| 14 | Torquay United | 4 – 1 | Chipstead | 255 |
| 15 | Brentford | 2 – 0 | Dulwich Hamlet | 420 |
| 16 | Portsmouth | 1 – 0 | Barton Rovers | 379 |
| 17 | Colchester United | 4 – 4† | Plymouth Argyle | 251 |
Plymouth Argyle advance 4–2 on penalties.
| 18 | Cheltenham Town | 9 – 0 | Bury Town | 160 |
| 19 | Woking | 1 – 2 | Crawley Town | 182 |
| 20 | Swindon Town | 1 – 4 | Leyton Orient | 197 |
| 21 | Burgess Hill Town | 0 – 2† | Bristol City | 405 |

† - After extra time

== Third round proper ==
| Tie no | Home team | Score | Away team | Attendance |
|---|---|---|---|---|
| 1 | Southampton | 7 – 0 | Portsmouth | 3,814 |
| 2 | AFC Bournemouth | 1 – 1† | Hereford United | 304 |
Hereford United advance 4–3 on penalties.
| 3 | Preston North End | 1 – 6† | Norwich City | 712 |
| 4 | Bolton Wanderers | 1 – 1 | Sheffield United | 729 |
Sheffield United advance 4–3 on penalties.
| 5 | Bristol Rovers | 1 – 2† | Crewe Alexandra | 250 |
| 6 | Accrington Stanley | 2 – 1† | West Ham United | 360 |
| 7 | Leeds United | 1 – 3 | Reading | 620 |
| 8 | Blackpool | 3 – 3† | Liverpool | 1,061 |
Liverpool advance 4–3 on penalties.
| 9 | Burnley | 0 – 2 | Manchester United | 1,489 |
| 10 | Hull City | 1 – 2 | Peterborough United | 133 |
| 11 | Sheffield Wednesday | 4 – 4 | Crystal Palace | 236 |
Sheffield Wednesday advance 4–2 on penalties.
| 12 | Nottingham Forest | 2 – 3 | Charlton Athletic | 527 |
| 13 | Queens Park Rangers | 1 – 4 | Fulham | 227 |
| 14 | Crawley Town | 0 – 2 | Watford | 230 |
| 15 | Derby County | 4 – 3 | Wigan Athletic | 495 |
| 16 | Leicester City | 3 – 0 | Rotherham United | 226 |

| Tie no | Home team | Score | Away team | Attendance |
|---|---|---|---|---|
| 17 | Ipswich Town | 1 – 1 | Sunderland | 391 |
Sunderland advance 4–2 on penalties.
| 18 | Arsenal | 5 – 0 | Torquay United | 472 |
| 19 | Bristol City | 1 – 0 | Brentford | 245 |
| 20 | Chelsea | 4 – 0 | Dartford | 342 |
| 21 | Cardiff City | 1 – 0 | Blackburn Rovers | 410 |
| 22 | Everton | 2 – 0 | Brighton & Hove Albion | 478 |
| 23 | Tottenham Hotspur | 2 – 1 | Middlesbrough | 402 |
| 24 | Huddersfield Town | 3 – 1† | Luton Town | 243 |
| 25 | Swansea City | 1 – 3 | Oxford United | 118 |
| 26 | Stoke City | 2 – 2 | Leyton Orient | 292 |
Stoke City advance 5–4 on penalties.
| 27 | West Bromwich Albion | 2 – 1 | Walsall | 565 |
| 28 | Bradford City | 0 – 3 | Millwall | 970 |
| 29 | Cheltenham Town | 1 – 2 | Birmingham City | 369 |
| 30 | Aston Villa | 4 – 3 | Plymouth Argyle | 451 |
| 31 | Manchester City | 4 – 0 | Doncaster Rovers | 241 |
| 32 | Barnsley | 0 – 2 | Newcastle United | 405 |

† - After extra time

== Fourth round proper ==
| Tie no | Home team | Score | Away team | Attendance |
|---|---|---|---|---|
| 1 | Tottenham Hotspur | 2 – 3 | Fulham | 520 |
| 2 | Newcastle United | 4 – 0 | Sunderland | 3,501 |
| 3 | Reading | 3 – 3 † | Crewe Alexandra | 604 |
Reading advance 4–2 on penalties.
| 4 | Leicester City | 0 – 1 † | Manchester United | 964 |
| 5 | Oxford United | 2 – 3 | Cardiff City | 279 |
| 6 | Millwall | 2 – 2 † | Sheffield United | 695 |
Sheffield United advance 8–7 on penalties.
| 7 | Southampton | 1 – 3 | Charlton Athletic | 513 |
| 8 | Accrington Stanley | 4 – 1 | Bristol City | 310 |

| Tie no | Home team | Score | Away team | Attendance |
|---|---|---|---|---|
| 9 | Everton | 4 – 3 | Birmingham City | 538 |
| 10 | West Bromwich Albion | 2 – 4 † | Huddersfield Town | 274 |
| 11 | Chelsea | 4 – 1 | Sheffield Wednesday | 404 |
| 12 | Liverpool | 3 – 1 | Aston Villa | 392 |
| 13 | Derby County | 3 – 1 | Stoke City | 652 |
| 14 | Manchester City | 3 – 1 | Hereford United | 323 |
| 15 | Watford | 3 – 1 | Norwich City | 472 |
| 16 | Peterborough United | 1 – 6 | Arsenal | 1,986 |

† - After extra time

== Fifth round proper ==
| Tie no | Home team | Score | Away team | Attendance |
|---|---|---|---|---|
| 1 | Cardiff City | 0 – 2 | Chelsea | 1,150 |
| 2 | Sheffield United | 0 – 2 | Everton | 1,488 |
| 3 | Charlton Athletic | 0 – 2 | Arsenal | 1,198 |
| 4 | Reading | 3 – 0 | Accrington Stanley | 495 |

| Tie no | Home team | Score | Away team | Attendance |
|---|---|---|---|---|
| 5 | Manchester City | 1 – 3 | Fulham | 290 |
| 6 | Huddersfield Town | 2 – 1 | Manchester United | 1,385 |
| 7 | Watford | 0 – 2 | Liverpool | 1,923 |
| 8 | Derby County | 0 – 1 | Newcastle United | 1,275 |

† - After extra time

== Quarter-finals ==
| Tie no | Home team | Score | Away team | Attendance |
|---|---|---|---|---|
| 1 | Fulham | 2 – 1 | Huddersfield Town | 1,102 |
| 2 | Arsenal | 3 – 1 | Everton | 2,725 |
| 3 | Reading | 4 – 4 | Liverpool | 1,349 |
Reading advance 5–4 on penalties.
| 4 | Newcastle United | 2 – 3 | Chelsea | 2,506 |

== Semi-finals ==
| Team 1 | Agg. | Team 2 | 1st leg | 2nd leg |
|---|---|---|---|---|
| Chelsea | 3 - 1 | Arsenal | 2 – 1 | 0 – 1 |
| Reading | 4 - 5 | Fulham | 2 – 2 | 2 – 3 |

=== First leg ===
1 April 2014
19:00

| Reading | 2 – 2 | Fulham |
|---|---|---|
| Dickie 24'; Fosu-Henry 34' (pen.) | Report | Hyndman 60' (pen.); Roberts 75' |

Madejski Stadium
Attendance: 1,762
Referee: James Linnington

10 April 2014
19:05

| Chelsea | 2 – 1 | Arsenal |
|---|---|---|
| Colkett 59'; Kiwomya 65' | Report | Akpom 55' |

Stamford Bridge
Attendance: 4,961
Referee: Tim Robinson

=== Second leg ===
7 April 2014
19:45

| Fulham | 3 – 2 | Reading |
|---|---|---|
| Dembélé 38' (pen.), 63', 90' | Report | Fosu-Henry 51' (pen.); Stacey 57' |

Craven Cottage
Attendance: 1,768
Referee: James Linington

17 April 2014
19:45

| Arsenal | 0 – 1 | Chelsea |
|---|---|---|
| | Report | Colkett 16' |

Emirates Stadium
Attendance: 9,695
Referee: Tim Robinson

== Final ==
=== First leg ===
28 April 2014
19:45

| Fulham | 3 – 2 | Chelsea |
|---|---|---|
| Dembélé 70'; Hyndman 71'; Burgess 79' | Report | Dasilva 49'; Musonda 83' |

Craven Cottage
Attendance: 4,457
Referee: Jon Moss

=== Second leg ===
5 May 2014
19:45

| Chelsea | 5 – 3 | Fulham |
|---|---|---|
| Colkett 22' (pen.); Houghton 24'; Ssewankambo 77'; Solanke 83', 90+2' | Report | Dembélé 5'; Roberts 26'; Sambou 38' |

Stamford Bridge
Attendance: 13,125
Referee: Jon Moss

Chelsea won 7–6 on aggregate.

== See also ==
- 2013–14 Professional U18 Development League
- 2013–14 Under-21 Premier League Cup
- 2013–14 FA Cup
- 2013–14 in English football
