= Huddersfield Town A.F.C. Reserves and Academy =

Huddersfield Town Academy
- Full name: Huddersfield Town F.C. Academy
- Founded: 1908
- Ground: Canalside Training Centre, Huddersfield
- President: Patrick Stewart
- Manager: U21: Michael Tonge; U18: Oliver Jeffries
- League: U21: Professional Development League 2 U18: U18 Professional Development League 2
Home colours	Away colours	Third colours

The Huddersfield Town Academy encompasses all of League One football club Huddersfield Town's youth development and pathway teams. The Academy was upgraded to Category Two status ahead of the 2025–26 season.

The Under 21s are the most senior level team and compete in the Professional Development League, providing a bridge between Academy football and the first team. Beneath them, the Academy fields age-group sides including the Under 18s, who play in the U18 Professional Development League 2, and whose most notable achievement is reaching the FA Youth Cup final in the 1973–74 season, losing 2–1 on aggregate to Tottenham Hotspur.

Home matches are primarily staged at the club’s Canalside training complex, with selected high-profile fixtures occasionally held at the first team's Accu Stadium.

== Under 21s ==
The club first entered a reserve team into a competition in the 1910–11 season, taking the first team's place in the Midland Football League upon their election to the Football League. They later played one season in the Yorkshire Combination, before joining the Central League in 1913–14, a competition they have won four times.

=== History ===
==== Reserve team years ====
The Huddersfield Town reserves competed in The Central League Division One East until the 2009–10 season when Huddersfield Town manager Lee Clark chose not to enter a reserve team in the Central League during the 2010-11 season, instead planning a series of high-quality friendlies. Clark stated that "the idea of reserve team football is to bridge the gap between youth teams and first team football" and that "[we] have faced a lot of very young sides in the reserve league this season, and that will not provide our own young professionals with the test they need".

Whilst playing at reserve league level, the reserves split their home games between A.F.C. Emley's Welfare Ground and the Galpharm Stadium.

First team coach Paul Stephenson was the last serving reserve team manager.

==== Development squad (2009–2012) ====
Lee Clark saw through his idea to discontinue the reserve team and subsequently created the club's development squad, to be managed by development coach Steve Watson. Following a behind-closed-doors game at Doncaster Rovers, Watson described the team's games as "working very well" "from both perspectives – fitness for our first team squad members and as a way of integrating the younger players into a higher level of football."

When Lee Clark left as manager of the first team on 15 February 2012, his coaching staff (including Watson) also left the club. On 12 April 2012 the club appointed former Manchester City Elite Development Squad leader and Rochdale first team manager Steve Eyre as the club's senior professional development Coach.

Most fixtures have so far been played at the club's training ground, Canalside, but occasionally the Galpharm Stadium has been used to host Development Squad games that are open to the public.

==== Professional Development League (2012–2020) ====
From the 2012–13 season, Huddersfield's development squad will compete in the newly formed Under-21 Professional Development League in the League 2 North Division. The league was set up as part of the wide-reaching Elite Player Performance Plan, and Town will be one of 12 clubs in the Category 2 Northern section along with Crewe Alexandra, Barnsley, Birmingham City, Coventry City, Derby County, Leeds United, Leicester City, Nottingham Forest, Sheffield United, Sheffield Wednesday and Wigan Athletic. The fixtures are set up to mirror those in the FA Premier Academy League for Under 18s.

In the 2019–20 season, a Huddersfield team entered a small league (under-21 plus three overage) along with Brentford and four Scottish clubs.

==== B Team (2020–2025) ====
In 2020 the club launched its B Team, effectively replacing the under-21 and under-23 age-level teams, and re-entered the Central League whilst continuing to take part in the Premier League Cup competition.

==== Under 21s (2025–) ====
Ahead of the 2025–26 season, the club announced their intention to rename the B Team to the Under 21s as part of the Academy upgrade to Category Two status, providing consistency across all Academy sides and mirroring the naming formats of other academy structures.

The Under 21s finished sixth in the 2025–26 Professional Development League table, progressing to the playoff stage against Premier League 2 opposition. The team beat Reading, Bournemouth and Everton on their way to the final, where they beat Norwich City 4–2 at Carrow Road to become Professional Development League champions.

=== Current squad ===
As of 6 November 2026

Note: Flags indicate national team as defined under FIFA eligibility rules; some limited exceptions apply. Players may hold more than one non-FIFA nationality.

No.	Pos.	Nation	Player
27	MF	IRL	Jay Sway
28	MF	ENG	Daniel Vost
36	DF	USA	Ian Togo
37	DF	WAL	Marlie Neil
39	DF	ZIM	Dylan Tawodzera
41	MF	GIB	Luke Schofield

No.	Pos.	Nation	Player
—	GK	NIR	Francis Hurl
—	DF	NGR	Nic Idemudia
—	DF	ENG	George Iorpenda
—	MF	ENG	Jonathan Hogg (player-coach)
—	FW	ENG	Zac Bowker
—	FW	ENG	Jahkyah Ebanks-Blake

=== Out on loan ===
Note: Flags indicate national team as defined under FIFA eligibility rules; some limited exceptions apply. Players may hold more than one non-FIFA nationality.

No.	Pos.	Nation	Player
26	FW	ENG	George Sebine (on loan at Rotherham United)
29	DF	ENG	Max Murray (on loan at Buxton)
—	GK	ENG	Hugo Bennett (on loan at Golcar United)
—	MF	ENG	Sahil Bashir (on loan at Greenock Morton)

=== Honours ===
- The Central League
  - Champions: 1914–15, 1924–25, 1925–26, 1930–31
- Professional Development League
  - League phase winners: 2013–14, 2015–16
  - Play-off champions: 2015–16, 2025–26

== Under 18s ==
The role of the Huddersfield Town Academy is to develop players and their abilities to their full potential for the club's first team. The academy has produced a number of players, including former England under-21 players Andy Booth and Jon Stead, former Irish Under 21 internationals Michael Collins and James Berrett as well as Nathan Clarke, who made 300 appearances for the first team. The current Academy Manager is former academy graduate Jon Worthington, with the under-18 team coached by Oliver Jeffries.

=== History ===
==== Future ====
After the arrival of chairman Dean Hoyle in the summer of 2009, there was an overall development in every aspect of Huddersfield Town, including the academy. The main development taking place with regards to the academy is the current redevelopment of the club's new training complex, Canalside. The project will conclude with the academy players training alongside their first-team counterparts for the first time at a high quality, purpose-built facility.

The 2024-25 season saw the return of the academy to Category Three status, seeing the reinstation of teams below the under-19 level.

=== Current squad ===
As of 9 September 2026

Note: Flags indicate national team as defined under FIFA eligibility rules; some limited exceptions apply. Players may hold more than one non-FIFA nationality.

No.	Pos.	Nation	Player
38	FW	JAM	Jamie Spencer
—	GK	ENG	TJ Ward
—	GK	ENG	Charlie Wrigglesworth
—	DF	ENG	Grant Amah
—	DF	JAM	Pharrell Bell
—	DF	ENG	Bobby Escritt
—	DF	BIH	Hasan Niksic
—	DF	RSA	El Niño Shelton
—	DF	JAM	Kiyonne Tinker

No.	Pos.	Nation	Player
—	MF	IND	Karamveer Cheema
—	MF	JAM	Lemaii Greenaway
—	MF	ENG	James Hughes
—	MF	ENG	Harrison Wilson
—	FW	ENG	Fortune Fontoh
—	FW	ITA	Fadil Hayes
—	FW	ENG	Paddy Key
—	FW	ENG	Michael Onyeka
—	FW	NGR	Dominic Sotomi

=== Honours ===
- Professional Development League
  - League phase winners: 2013–14, 2014–15
  - Play-off champions: 2013–14

== Current academy staff ==
Position	Staff
President	Patrick Stewart
Academy Manager	Jonathan Worthington
Strategic Advisor	David Wetherall
Head of Coaching	George Danaher
Under 21s Head Coach	Michael Tonge
Professional Development Phase Lead Coach	Oliver Jeffries
Youth Development Lead Coach	Oran Thompson
Foundation Phase Lead Coach	Josh Waddingham
Under-16s Coach	Paul Quinn
Academy Goalkeeping Coach	Neil Bennett

Last updated: 5 Nov 2024
Source: New Hires Complete Town Academy Coaching Structure

== Recent academy graduates ==
Academy graduates who still play for Huddersfield, including those that are currently out on loan to other clubs, are highlighted in green.

Appearances and goals are those in competitive fixtures for Huddersfield Town.

Player	Current Club	Born	International Honours	Debut	Apps	Goals	Manager
Nicholas Bilokapic	Huddersfield Town	(Australia) Camperdown	Australia U-17	Age 19 v Burnley (a), 8 January 2022	1	0	Carlos Corberán
Etienne Camara	Huddersfield Town	(France) Noisy-le-Grand		Age 17 v Plymouth Argyle (h), 9 January 2021	1	0	Carlos Corberán
Myles Bright	Huddersfield Town	(England) London		Age 18 v Plymouth Argyle (h), 9 January 2021	1	0	Carlos Corberán
Mustapha Olagunju	Huddersfield Town	(England) Plumstead		Age 19 v Plymouth Argyle (h), 9 January 2021	1	0	Carlos Corberán
Pat Jones	Huddersfield Town	(England) Stockport	Wales U-17	Age 17 v Plymouth Argyle (h), 9 January 2021	3	0	Carlos Corberán
Brahima Diarra	Huddersfield Town	(France) Paris		Age 17 v AFC Bournemouth (a), 12 December 2020	2	0	Carlos Corberán
Romoney Crichlow	Huddersfield Town	(England) Luton		Age 21 v Rochdale (h), 5 September 2020	6	1	Carlos Corberán
Ben Jackson	Huddersfield Town	(England) Stockport		Age 19 v Rochdale (h), 5 September 2020	3	0	Carlos Corberán
Josh Austerfield	Huddersfield Town	(England) Morley		Age 19 v Rochdale (h), 5 September 2020	2	0	Carlos Corberán
Scott High	Huddersfield Town	(England) Sheffield	Scotland U-21	Age 19 v Millwall (a), 22 July 2020	40	0	Danny Schofield
Micah Obiero	Huddersfield Town	(England) London		Age 19 v Millwall (a), 22 July 2020	1	0	Danny Schofield
Kian Harratt	Huddersfield Town	(England) Barnsley		Age 17 v Leeds United (h), 7 December 2019	1	0	Danny Cowley
Rarmani Edmonds-Green	Huddersfield Town	(England) London		Age 19 v Lincoln City (h), 13 August 2019	27	2	Jan Siewert
Ryan Schofield	Huddersfield Town	(England) Huddersfield	England U-20	Age 19 v Lincoln City (h), 13 August 2019	35	0	Jan Siewert
Lewis O'Brien	Huddersfield Town	(England) Colchester		Age 20 v Queens Park Rangers (a), 10 August 2019	128	8	Jan Siewert
Matty Daly	Huddersfield Town	(England) Stockport	England U-18	Age 18 v Watford (h), 20 April 2019	12	1	Jan Siewert
Aaron Rowe	Huddersfield Town	(England) London		Age 18 v AFC Bournemouth (h), 9 March 2019	26	2	Jan Siewert
Jordan Williams	Barnsley	(England) Huddersfield	England U-18	Age 17 v Rotherham United (h), 23 August 2017	1	0	David Wagner
Lloyd Allinson	Gainsborough Trinity	(England) Rothwell		Age 22 v Brentford (h), 7 May 2016	1	0	David Wagner
Flo Bojaj	Etar	(England) London	Albania U-17	Age 19 v Milton Keynes Dons (h), 20 October 2015	7	1	Chris Powell
Joe Wilkinson	Ossett Albion	(England) Dewsbury		Age 19 v Blackburn Rovers (h), 25 April 2015	1	0	Chris Powell
Jake Charles	Stafford Rangers	(England) Leeds	Wales U-21	Age 19 v Fulham (h), 21 March 2015	1	0	Chris Powell
Will Boyle	Cheltenham Town	(England) Leeds		Age 19 v Reading (h), 24 February 2015	2	0	Chris Powell
Matt Crooks	Rotherham United	(England) Leeds		Age 20 v AFC Bournemouth (h), 9 August 2014	1	0	Mark Robins
Philip Billing	Bournemouth	(Denmark) Copenhagen	Denmark U-21	Age 17 v Leicester City (h), 26 April 2014	91	6	Mark Robins
Duane Holmes	Huddersfield Town	(United States) Columbus, Georgia	United States	Age 18 v Hull City (a), 24 September 2013	86	9	Mark Robins
Jordan Sinnott	Deceased	(England) Bradford		Age 18 v Leicester City (h), 26 January 2013	5	0	Mark Lillis
Aidan Chippendale	Shaw Lane	(England) Bradford		Age 18 v Bristol Rovers (a), 12 March 2011	1	0	Lee Clark
Jack Hunt	Bristol City	(England) Rothwell		Age 20 v Colchester United (h), 23 January 2011	121	4	Lee Clark
Chris Atkinson	Farsley Celtic	(England) Halifax		Age 18 v Macclesfield Town (h), 27 November 2010	13	1	Lee Clark
Liam Ridehalgh	Tranmere Rovers	(England) Halifax		Age 19 v Charlton Athletic (h), 28 August 2010	26	0	Lee Clark
Simon Eastwood	Oxford United	(England) Luton	England U-19	Age 19 v Leyton Orient (a), 2 May 2009	1	0	Lee Clark
Alex Smithies	Cardiff City	(England) Huddersfield	England U-19	Age 17 v Southend United (a), 5 December 2007	274	0	Andy Ritchie
Daniel Broadbent	Mossley	(England) Leeds	England U-16	Age 17 v Tranmere Rovers (a), 26 October 2007	6	0	Andy Ritchie
Shane Killock	Bradford Park Avenue	(England) Huddersfield		Age 18 v Crewe Alexandra (a), 7 September 2007	1	0	Andy Ritchie
Lucas Akins	Burton Albion	(England) Huddersfield		Age 18 v Northampton Town (a), 27 April 2007	6	0	Andy Ritchie
James Berrett	Retired	(England) Halifax	(Republic of Ireland) Rep. Ireland U-21	Age 18 v Oldham Athletic (a), 7 April 2007	41	2	Gerry Murphy
Danny Racchi	Free Agent	(England) Elland		Age 19 v Port Vale (h), 31 March 2007	6	0	Gerry Murphy
Joe Skarz	Kettering Town	(England) Huddersfield		Age 17 v Scunthorpe United (h), 4 November 2006	81	1	Peter Jackson
James Hand	Kingscourt Harps	(Republic of Ireland) Drogheda	(Republic of Ireland) Rep. Ireland U-21	Age 18 v Boston United (a), 19 October 2005	2	0	Peter Jackson
Aaron Hardy	Farsley	(England) South Elmsall		Age 19 v Boston United (a), 19 October 2005	19	0	Peter Jackson
Matty Young	Frickley Athletic	(England) Leeds		Age 19 v Walsall (h), 15 October 2005	42	2	Peter Jackson
Michael Collins	Alfreton Town	(England) Halifax	(Republic of Ireland) Rep. Ireland U-21	Age 18 v Blackpool (h), 19 February 2005	197	22	Peter Jackson
Tom Clarke	Salford City	(England) Halifax	England U-19	Age 17 v Milton Keynes Dons (a), 12 February 2005	112	3	Peter Jackson
John McAliskey	Huddersfield YMCA	(England) Huddersfield	(Republic of Ireland) Rep. Ireland U-21	Age 19 v Macclesfield Town (h), 13 March 2004	48	8	Peter Jackson
Anthony Lloyd	Retired	(England) Taunton		Age 19 v Leyton Orient (h), 27 September 2003	51	3	Peter Jackson
Adnan Ahmed	Retired	(England) Burnley	Pakistan	Age 19 v Rochdale (a), 16 September 2003	45	2	Peter Jackson
Andy Holdsworth	Barnsley (Academy Coach)	(England) Pontefract		Age 19 v Bristol Rovers (h), 30 August 2003	261	8	Peter Jackson
John McCombe	Chester	(England) Pontefract		Age 17 v Oldham Athletic (h), 3 May 2003	20	0	Mel Machin
David Mirfin	Mansfield Town	(England) Sheffield		Age 18 v Oldham Athletic (h), 3 May 2003	179	12	Mel Machin
Phil Senior	Retired	(England) Huddersfield		Age 20 v Crewe Alexandra (a), 18 January 2003	57	0	Mick Wadsworth
Nat Brown	Brighouse Town	(England) Sheffield		Age 21 v Northampton Town (a), 14 September 2002	84	0	Mick Wadsworth
Paul Scott	Retired	(England) Wakefield		Age 22 v Peterborough United (a), 17 August 2002	37	2	Mick Wadsworth
Jon Worthington	Huddersfield Town (Academy Physio)	(England) Dewsbury		Age 19 v Plymouth Argyle (a), 13 August 2002	237	14	Mick Wadsworth
Jon Stead	Notts County	(England) Huddersfield	England U21	Age 19 v Brentford (h), 10 August 2002	100	27	Mick Wadsworth
Nathan Clarke	FC Halifax Town	(England) Halifax		Age 18 v Stoke City (a), 8 September 2001	299	10	Lou Macari

Information in the above table is correct as of 5 May 2022
