= Flo Bojaj =

Footballer (born 1996)

Florent Bojaj
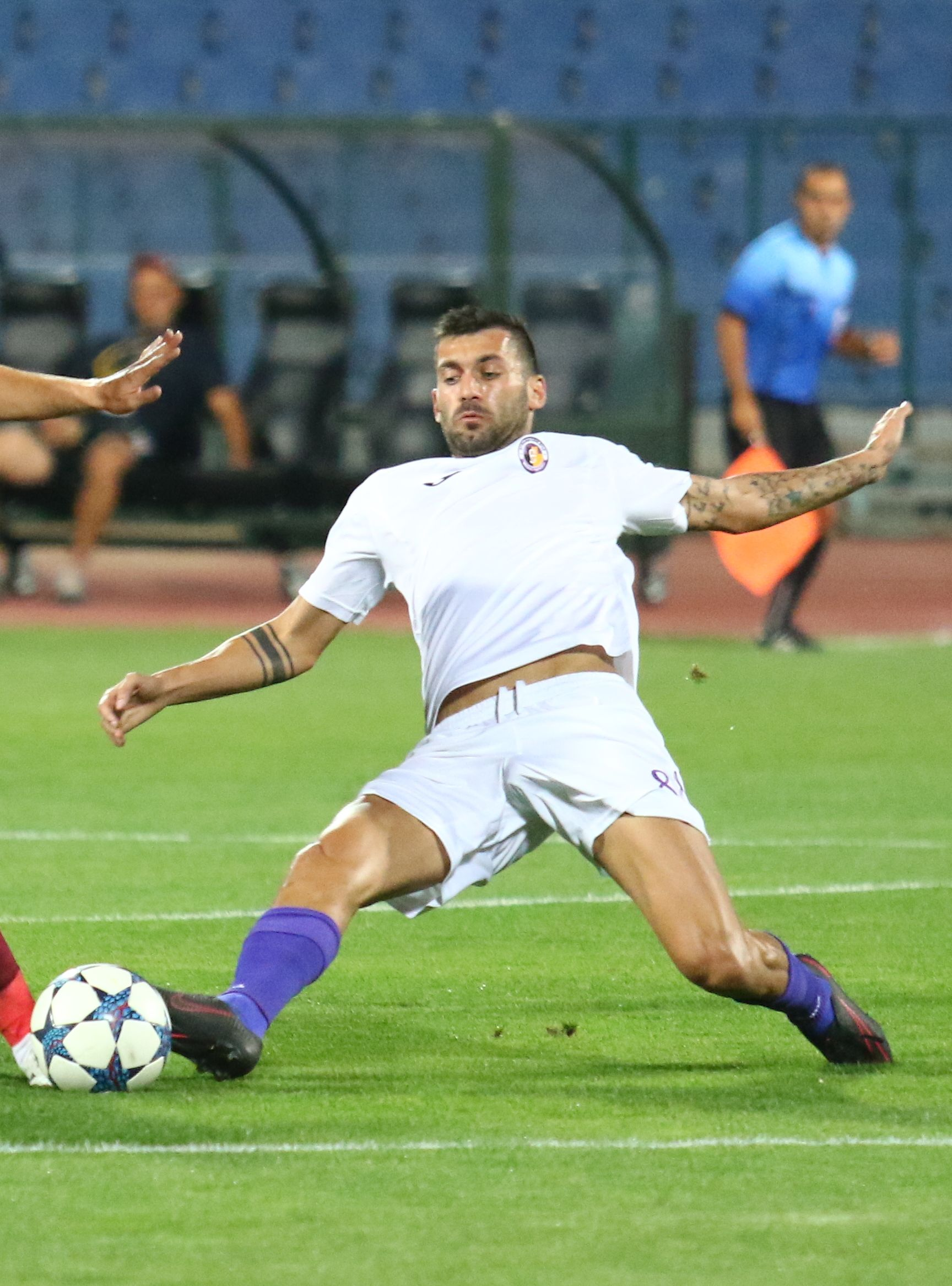

Personal information
- Full name: Florent Bojaj
- Date of birth: 13 April 1996 (age 30)
- Place of birth: London, England
- Height: 1.83 m (6 ft 0 in)
- Position: Midfielder

Team information
- Current team: Hanwell Town

Youth career
- –2013: Boreham Wood
- 2013–2014: Huddersfield Town

Senior career*
Years	Team	Apps	(Gls)
2014–2017	Huddersfield Town	8	(1)
2016–2017	→ Kilmarnock (loan)	2	(0)
2017	→ Newport County (loan)	1	(0)
2017	Welling United	3	(0)
2017	Walton & Hersham	11	(9)
2018	Pirin Blagoevgrad	11	(5)
2018–2020	Etar	55	(8)
2020–2022	Kickers Offenbach	60	(10)
2022–2023	Hemel Hempstead Town	1	(0)
2023–	Hanwell Town		

International career
2012–2013	Albania U17	3	(0)
- * Club domestic league appearances and goals as of 12:21, 17 December 2021 (UTC)

Florent "Flo" Bojaj (born 13 April 1996) is a professional footballer who plays as a midfielder for Hanwell Town. Born in England, he has represented Albania at youth international level.

== Early life ==
Bojaj was born in London, England to Kosovo Albanian parents from Kosovo.

== Club career ==
=== Youth career ===
Flo Bojaj started his youth career with Oxhey Wanderers in the West Herts County League, where he was spotted by manager Andrew Hood while playing for his school.

Bojaj went on to play for Boreham Wood, before signing for Huddersfield in 2013.

=== Huddersfield Town ===
Bojaj made several appearances for the Huddersfield Town Under-18s and Under-21s as both teams won their respective league titles for consecutive seasons.

On 29 October 2015, he signed a contract with the Terriers until 2017 – with the club having the option of an extra year.

After being named on the bench for a few games, Bojaj made his professional debut as a late substitute in Town's 2–0 win over Milton Keynes Dons, where he set up the second goal for Jamie Paterson. On 8 March 2016, Bojaj scored his first goal for Huddersfield, contributing the third in a 3–1 win over Reading.

He was released at the end of the 2016–17 season.

==== Kilmarnock (loan) ====
On 1 July 2016, Bojaj was loaned out to Kilmarnock. He made his debut two weeks later in a Scottish League Cup match against Clyde.

==== Newport County (loan) ====
On 10 January 2017, he joined Newport County on loan. He made his only appearance for Newport in a League Two match against Colchester United as a 75th-minute substitute on 14 January.

=== Welling United ===
After a trial with St Albans City in the pre-season, Bojaj completed a move to National League South side Welling United on 8 September 2017.

On 11 October, it was announced that Bojaj had left the club by mutual consent after making three appearances.

=== Walton & Hersham ===
Upon his departure, he joined Combined Counties Premier Division club Walton & Hersham.

On 14 October, Bojaj made his debut in a 2–0 league win at Horley Town. He scored the first goal and won the penalty for the second.

The following month, he scored his first hat-trick in a 9–1 win against Banstead Athletic.

=== Etar ===
On 17 July 2018, Bojaj signed with Bulgarian club Etar for two years.

In January 2023, Bojaj signed for Southern League side Hanwell Town.

== International career ==
On 21 February 2012, Bojaj making his debut with Albania U17 in a friendly match against Slovenia U17. He came on as a substitute at 65th minute in place of Maldin Ymeraj.

In May 2016, after Kosovo was officially recognized by UEFA and FIFA. Bojaj declared that he was interested in representing Kosovo.

== Career statistics ==
As of match played 3 March 2019

Appearances and goals by club, season and competition
Club	Season	League			National cup		League cup		Other		Total	
Club	Season	Division	Apps	Goals	Apps	Goals	Apps	Goals	Apps	Goals	Apps	Goals
Huddersfield Town	2015–16	Championship	8	1	0	0	0	0	—		8	1
Kilmarnock (loan)	2016–17	Scottish Premiership	2	0	0	0	3	0	0	0	5	0
Newport County (loan)	2016–17	League Two	1	0	0	0	0	0	0	0	1	0
Welling United	2017–18	National League South	3	0	0	0	—		0	0	3	0
Walton & Hersham	2017–18	Combined Counties Premier Division	11	9	0	0	1	0	0	0	12	9
Pirin Blagoevgrad	2017–18	First League	14	5	0	0	—		—		14	5
Etar Veliko Tarnovo	2018–19	First League	23	5	1	0	—		—		24	5
Career total			62	20	1	0	4	0	0	0	67	20
