= Jake Charles =

English footballer

Personal information
- Full name: Jake David Charles
- Date of birth: 16 February 1996 (age 30)
- Place of birth: Mirfield, England
- Height: 6 ft 0 in (1.83 m)
- Position: Striker

Team information
- Current team: Hebburn Town

Youth career
- –2007: Garforth Villa
- 2007–2015: Huddersfield Town

Senior career*
Years	Team	Apps	(Gls)
2015–2016	Huddersfield Town	1	(0)
2015	→ Guiseley (loan)	0	(0)
2016–2017	Barnsley	0	(0)
2016–2017	→ York City (loan)	2	(0)
2017–2018	Stalybridge Celtic	38	(3)
2018–2020	Stafford Rangers	55	(18)
2020–2021	Farsley Celtic	15	(1)
2021–2022	Stafford Rangers	35	(9)
2022–2024	Scarborough Athletic	27	(2)
2023	→ FC United of Manchester (loan)	7	(0)
2023–2024	→ Ashton United (loan)		
2024–2026	Whitby Town	15	(4)
2026–	Hebburn Town	8	(5)

International career
2012	Wales U17	3	(0)
2014	Wales U19	3	(0)
2015–2016	Wales U21	9	(2)
- * Club domestic league appearances and goals as of 11:25, 16 January 2025 (UTC)

Jake David Charles (born 16 February 1996) is a semi-professional footballer who plays as a striker for Hebburn Town. Born in England, he has represented Wales at youth international level.

== Club career ==
=== Huddersfield Town ===
Charles was born in Mirfield, West Yorkshire. He began to play football when he was three and joined Battyeford Juniors and Garforth Villa's youth academy before joining Huddersfield Town's U11 side when he was 10.

Having progressed through the academy, Charles signed his first professional contract with the club on 28 February 2013 and started his first years scholars. With his contract set to expire at the end of the 2013–14 season, Charles signed a contract extension, keeping him until 2017. Throughout 2013–14, Charles was honoured by the League Football Education and was nominated for the League Football Education's Championship Apprentice of the Year, but lost out to Mason Bennett of Derby County.

After appearing as unused substitute against Norwich City on 17 March 2015 for the first time, Charles made his first-team debut for Huddersfield Town as an 87th-minute substitute in a 2–0 Championship defeat by Fulham. Later in the 2014–15 season Charles scored twice for the Huddersfield Town under-21 team as they beat Crystal Palace under-21s to seal a place in the Professional Development League 2 play-off Final.

On 31 July 2015, he joined National League club Guiseley on a one-month loan until 29 August 2015 but he did not make any appearances for the club during this spell.

=== Barnsley ===
On 1 September 2016, Charles signed for fellow Championship club Barnsley on a contract until the end of 2016–17. On 25 November 2016, he joined National League club York City on loan until 1 January 2017. Charles was released by Barnsley at the end of 2016–17.

=== Stalybridge Celtic ===
Charles signed for Northern Premier League Premier Division club Stalybridge Celtic on 28 July 2017. He made 45 appearances in all competitions, scoring 12 goals, as Stalybridge finished in 22nd place in the table. He left the club at the end of 2017–18.

=== Stafford Rangers ===
In October 2018, Charles joined Northern Premier League side Stafford Rangers and scored on his debut.

=== Farsley Celtic ===
On 29 May 2020 National League North club Farsley Celtic announced they had signed Charles.

In June 2021, Charles returned to Stafford Rangers. He finished the season with nine goals in 39 appearances in all competitions.

In May 2022, it was announced that Charles had joined Scarborough Athletic following their promotion to National League North. On 29 September, he joined FC United of Manchester on an initial one-month loan deal. In November 2023, he joined Ashton United on an initial one-month loan deal. The following month, the loan was extended by an additional two months. After remaining on loan at Ashton, Charles was released by Scarborough at the end of the season.

On 8 June 2024, Charles joined Northern Premier League Premier Division side Whitby Town.

In June 2026, Charles joined newly-promoted National League North side Hebburn Town.

== International career ==
Charles has represented Wales at under-16, under-17 and under-19 and under-21 levels. After making his debut for the Wales under-17 side, Charles became the fourth member of his family to play for the country after his grandfather, his great-uncle Mel and his cousin Jeremy. He was capped three times by the under-17s in 2012, before appearing three times for the under-19s in 2014.

Charles was called up to the Wales under-21 squad for their 2017 UEFA European Under-21 Championship match against Bulgaria on 31 March 2015. He made his debut on 4 September as an 81st-minute substitute in a 3–1 away won over Luxembourg in 2017 UEFA European Under-21 Championship qualifying. He finished his under-21 career with nine appearances from 2015 to 2016.

== Style of play ==
A versatile forward, Charles can play both as a striker or as a winger.

== Personal life ==
Charles is the grandson of Wales international player John Charles. While growing up, Jake Charles attended Ninelands Primary School and Garforth Academy.

== Career statistics ==
As of end of 2019–20 season

Appearances and goals by club, season and competition
Club	Season	League			National Cup		League Cup		Other		Total	
Club	Season	Division	Apps	Goals	Apps	Goals	Apps	Goals	Apps	Goals	Apps	Goals
Huddersfield Town	2014–15	Championship	1	0	0	0	0	0	—		1	0
Huddersfield Town	2015–16	Championship	0	0	0	0	0	0	—		0	0
Huddersfield Town	2016–17	Championship	0	0	—		0	0	—		0	0
Huddersfield Town	Total		1	0	0	0	0	0	—		1	0
Guiseley (loan)	2015–16	National League	0	0	—		—		—		0	0
Barnsley	2016–17	Championship	0	0	0	0	0	0	—		0	0
York City (loan)	2016–17	National League	2	0	—		—		0	0	2	0
Stalybridge Celtic	2017–18	Northern Premier League; Premier Division	38	3	0	0	—		7 (Note: Three appearances and one goal in FA Trophy, one appearance in Northern Premier League Challenge Cup, three appearances and eight goals in Cheshire Senior Cup)	9	45	12
Stafford Rangers	2018–19	Northern Premier League; Premier Division	28	10	—		—		9	4	37	14
Stafford Rangers	2019–20	Northern Premier League; Premier Division	27	8	—		—		8	6	35	14
Stafford Rangers	Total		55	18	—	—	—		17	10	72	28
Career total			96	21	0	0	0	0	24	19	120	40
