= 2017–18 FA Youth Cup =

Football Association Youth Cup

Tournament details
- Country: England; Wales
- Teams: 507 (overall)

Final positions
- Champions: Chelsea (9th Title)
- Runners-up: Arsenal (2nd Runner Up Finish)

Tournament statistics
- Top goal scorer: (England) Callum Hudson-Odoi Chelsea (10 Goals)

The 2017–18 FA Youth Cup was the 66th edition of the FA Youth Cup. The defending champions were Chelsea and they retained the trophy for the fifth year in a row after a 7–1 aggregate victory over Arsenal in the final.

== Calendar ==
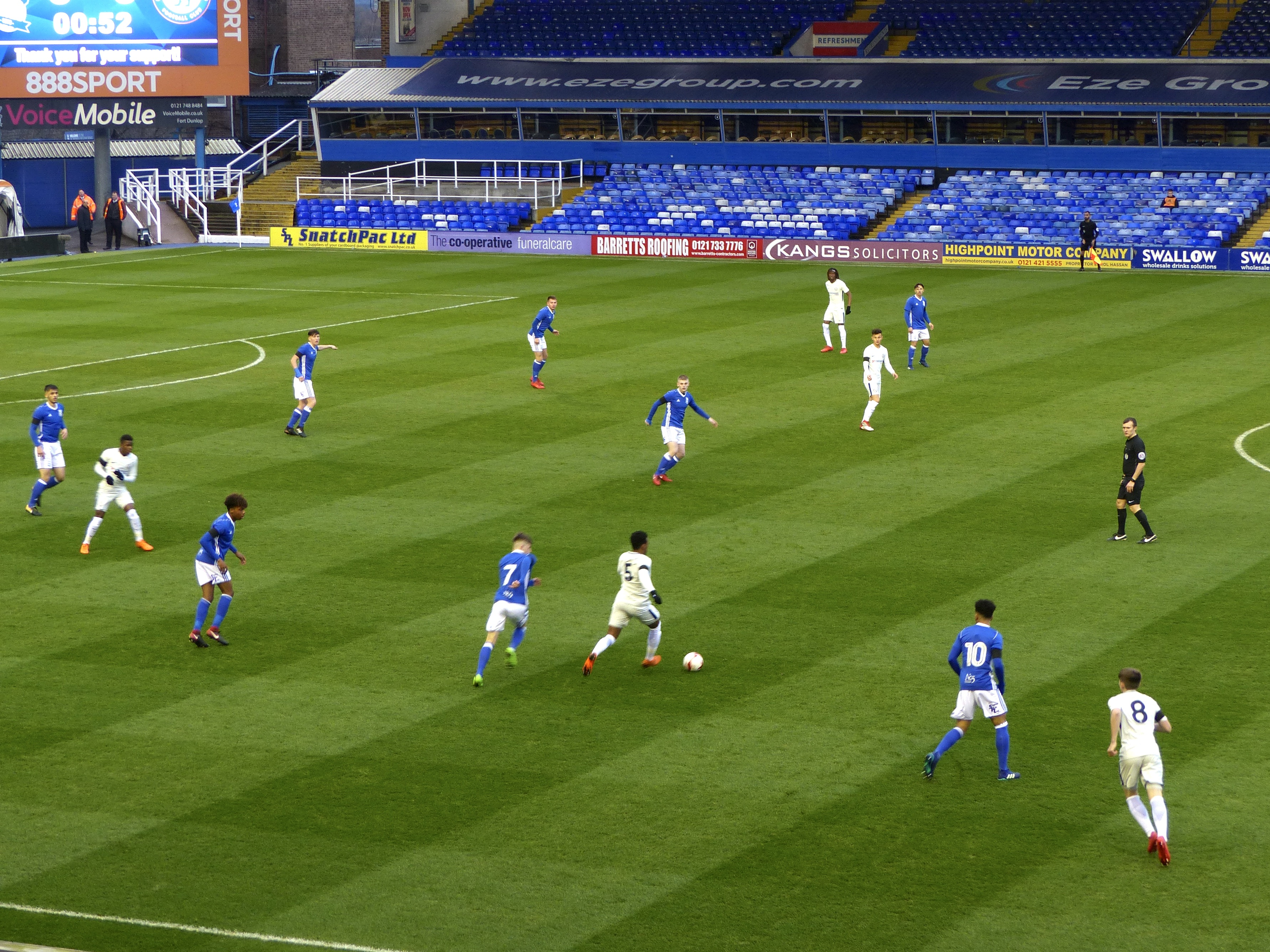
Action from the Birmingham City v Chelsea 2017–18 FA Youth Cup semi-final first leg, St Andrews, Birmingham

Round	Matches played from
Preliminary round	4 September 2017
First round qualifying	18 September 2017
Second round qualifying	2 October 2017
Third round qualifying	16 October 2017
First round	4 November 2017
Second round	18 November 2017
Third round	16 December 2017
Fourth round	20 January 2018
Fifth round	10 February 2018
Quarter-finals	3 March 2018
Semi-finals (two legs)	24 March/7 April 2018
Final (two legs)	27 April/30 April 2018

== Qualifying rounds ==
=== Preliminary round ===
272 teams took part in the Preliminary round. The lowest level teams competing were from level 11 of the English football league system. The draws were regionalized on a North/South basis.

Tie	Home team	Score	Away team	Att.
1	Durham City (10)	0–2	Spennymoor Town (6)	60
2	Morpeth Town (9)	3–0	Hebburn Town (10)	
3	Curzon Ashton (6)	0–1	Nelson (10)	141
4	Ashton Athletic (9)	1–0	Witton Albion (7)	45
5	AFC Darwen (9)	0–4	Daisy Hill (10)	119
6	Irlam (9)	2–1	St Helens Town (10)	67
7	West Didsbury & Chorlton (9)	W.O.	Warrington Town (7)	n/a
8	Burscough (9)	W.O.	Lancaster City (7)	n/a
9	Hyde United (8)	2–1	Chorley (6)	67
10	Skelmersdale United (8)	W.O.	FC United of Manchester (6)	n/a
11	Ashton United (7)	W.O.	Chadderton (10)	n/a
12	Stockport County (6)	3–4	Stockport Town (10)	162
13	Salford City (6)	1–0	Mossley (8)	196
14	Radcliffe Borough (8)	2–5	Nantwich Town (7)	
15	Bamber Bridge (8)	W.O.	Altrincham (7)	n/a
16	Ossett Town (8)	1–3 (a.e.t.)	Harrogate Town (6)	53
17	Staveley Miners Welfare (9)	4–0	Stocksbridge Park Steels (8)	147
18	Silsden (10)	W.O.	Glasshoughton Welfare (10)	n/a
19	Worksop Town (9)	3–1	Garforth Town (9)	77
20	Nostell Miners Welfare (10)	W.O.	North Ferriby United (6)	n/a
21	Worsbrough Bridge Athletic (10)	1–2	Bottesford Town (9)	
22	Sheffield (8)	4–3	Hall Road Rangers (9)	90
23	York City (6)	4–0	Tadcaster Albion (8)	364
24	Eastwood Community (11)	5–2	Deeping Rangers (9)	
25	Harborough Town (9)	5–2	Leicester Road (10)	
26	Ilkeston Town (10)	W.O.	Boston United (6)	n/a
27	Long Eaton United (9)	9–4	Anstey Nomads (10)	79
28	Aylestone Park (10)	3–2	Grantham Town (7)	70
29	West Bridgford (10)	3–0	Lincoln United (8)	46
30	Dunkirk (10)	5–2	Leicester Nirvana (9)	36
31	Ashby Ivanhoe (10)	0–2	Belper Town (8)	57
32	Alfreton Town (6)	2–1 (a.e.t.)	Mickleover Sports (7)	119
33	Sporting Khalsa (9)	2–3	Lichfield City (10)	
34	Nuneaton Griff (10)	2–3	Hereford (7)	52
35	Racing Club Warwick (10)	2–3	Walsall Wood (10)	
36	Sutton Coldfield Town (7)	W.O.	Wolverhampton Casuals (10)	n/a
37	Newcastle Town (8)	2–2 (a.e.t.) (4–2 p)	Wednesfield (10)	50
38	Bedworth United (8)	W.O.	Kidsgrove Athletic (8)	n/a
39	Stafford Town (10)	1–3	Worcester City (9)	40
40	Bromsgrove Sporting (9)	1–2	Leek Town (8)	137
41	Leamington (7)	2–3	Stratford Town (7)	23
42	Kidderminster Harriers (6)	3–0	Alvechurch (8)	
43	AFC Telford United (6)	3–2	Bromyard Town (11)	
44	Bilston Town (10)	3–2	Coton Green (11)	
45	Tipton Town (11)	1–5	Tamworth (6)	
46	Rushall Olympic (7)	2–3	Dudley Town (10)	
47	Malvern Town (10)	3–1	Rugby Town (9)	
48	Highgate United (9)	4–5	Boldmere St Michaels (9)	
49	AFC Rushden & Diamonds (8)	12–0	Rushden & Higham United (10)	
50	Peterborough Northern Star (9)	2–1	St Neots Town (7)	76
51	Brackley Town (6)	5–0	Yaxley (9)	84
52	Biggleswade Town (7)	6–0	Huntingdon Town (10)	
53	Cogenhoe United (9)	1–3	Biggleswade United (9)	
54	Cambridge City (8)	3–2 (a.e.t.)	Felixstowe & Walton United (9)	64
55	Framlingham Town (10)	1–3	Dereham Town (8)	
56	Wisbech St Mary (10)	0–9	Swaffham Town (10)	
57	Histon (9)	0–6	Gorleston (9)	
58	AFC Sudbury (8)	8–1	King's Lynn Town (7)	
59	Whitton United (10)	0–2	Leiston (7)	
60	Bury Town (8)	0–2	Wroxham (9)	54
61	Fakenham Town (9)	1–4	Haverhill Rovers (9)	
62	Ipswich Wanderers (9)	4–2	Newmarket Town (9)	
63	Woodbridge Town (10)	3–1	Walsham-le-Willows (9)	62
64	Basildon United (9)	W.O.	Witham Town (8)	n/a
65	Saffron Walden Town (9)	3–1	Potters Bar Town (8)	110
66	Hoddesdon Town (9)	5–2	Barkingside (9)	
67	Hitchin Town (7)	W.O.	Little Oakley (10)	n/a
68	Barking (8)	3–1	Ware (8)	45

Tie	Home team	Score	Away team	Att.
69	AFC Hornchurch (8)	2–0	Takeley (9)	120
70	Hullbridge Sports (9)	1–0	Waltham Forest (9)	54
71	Ilford (9)	0–5	Cheshunt (8)	22
72	Harlow Town (7)	W.O.	Brightlingsea Regent (7)	n/a
73	Halstead Town (10)	1–5	Bishop's Stortford (7)	
74	Brentwood Town (8)	2–1	Stanway Rovers (9)	57
75	Concord Rangers (6)	3–0	Waltham Abbey (8)	90
76	Great Wakering Rovers (9)	W.O.	Hadley (9)	n/a
77	Royston Town (7)	4–1	Redbridge (9)	
78	Heybridge Swifts (8)	2–5	Romford (8)	51
79	Tower Hamlets (9)	5–3	Grays Athletic (8)	64
80	Coggeshall Town (9)	6–0	Sawbridgeworth Town (9)	
81	Thurrock (7)	9–1	Aveley (8)	70
82	Northwood (8)	5–1	Haringey Borough (8)	30
83	Kings Langley (7)	3–2	Colney Heath (9)	79
84	Hemel Hempstead Town (6)	4–0	Sun Sports (9)	144
85	Staines Town (7)	5–3 (a.e.t.)	Harrow Borough (7)	
86	Bedfont Sports (9)	W.O.	Winslow United (10)	n/a
87	Edgware Town (9)	5–3	Cockfosters (9)	31
88	Buckingham Athletic (10)	7–0	Oxhey Jets (9)	40
89	Harefield United (10)	4–0	Spelthorne Sports (9)	24
90	Hendon (7)	7–0	North Greenford United (9)	60
91	Flackwell Heath (9)	2–1	Newport Pagnell Town (9)	83
92	Wealdstone (6)	1–2	Uxbridge (8)	
93	Wingate & Finchley (7)	10–0	Chalfont St Peter (8)	62
94	Leverstock Green (9)	0–4	Aylesbury (8)	36
95	Carshalton Athletic (8)	W.O.	Eastbourne Town (9)	n/a
96	Erith Town (9)	2–10	Dulwich Hamlet (7)	116
97	Phoenix Sports (8)	2–1	VCD Athletic (8)	139
98	Lingfield (10)	1–4	Croydon (9)	
99	Ashford United (8)	8–2	Chatham Town (9)	63
100	East Grinstead Town (8)	W.O.	Lewisham Borough (Community) (10)	n/a
101	Lordswood (9)	W.O.	Glebe (9)	n/a
102	Corinthian (9)	0–3	Eastbourne Borough (6)	36
103	Sevenoaks Town (9)	0–2	Dartford (6)	110
104	Ramsgate (8)	2–2 (a.e.t.) (4–2 p)	Hollands & Blair (9)	90
105	Margate (7)	3–0	Thamesmead Town (8)	65
106	Hampton & Richmond Borough (6)	2–1	Chertsey Town (9)	101
107	Steyning Town (10)	5–1	Chichester City (9)	46
108	Camberley Town (9)	7–3	Raynes Park Vale (10)	
109	Whitehawk (6)	4–1	Worthing (7)	
110	Whyteleafe (8)	4–1	Balham (9)	32
111	Dorking Wanderers (7)	1–5	Bognor Regis Town (6)	
112	Ash United (10)	4–0	Newhaven (9)	
113	Knaphill (9)	5–4 (a.e.t.)	Metropolitan Police (7)	59
114	Chessington & Hook United (10)	4–1 (a.e.t.)	East Preston (9)	
115	Shoreham (8)	2–3	Three Bridges (9)	35
116	Frimley Green (10)	1–4	Worthing United (9)	63
117	Corinthian Casuals (8)	1–1 (a.e.t.) (6–5 p)	Merstham (7)	89
118	Guildford City (9)	0–1	Hastings United (8)	
119	Crowborough Athletic (9)	4–0	Horley Town (9)	
120	Walton & Hersham (9)	3–1	Westfield (9)	31
121	Oxford City (6)	6–5	Basingstoke Town (7)	64
122	Bracknell Town (9)	5–1	Highmoor Ibis (9)	93
123	Ascot United (9)	0–3	Marlow (8)	50
124	Alton Town (10)	W.O.	Slough Town (7)	n/a
125	Kidlington (8)	0–2	Fleet Spurs (10)	30
126	Poole Town (6)	4–4 (a.e.t.) (4–5 p)	Farnborough (7)	72
127	Havant & Waterlooville (6)	0–1	Salisbury (8)	51
128	Christchurch (10)	1–2	Team Solent (9)	62
129	Cirencester Town (8)	5–2	Oldland Abbotonians (10)	
130	Gloucester City (6)	3–2	Bristol Manor Farm (8)	
131	Paulton Rovers (8)	1–2	Wellington (9)	47
132	Ashton & Backwell United (10)	1–6	Wells City (9)	40
133	Welton Rovers (10)	W.O.	Willand Rovers (9)	n/a
134	Keynsham Town (10)	0–2	Tavistock (10)	53
135	Weston-super-Mare (6)	4–2	Portishead Town (10)	
136	Bridgwater Town (9)	1–3	Radstock Town (10)	

=== First round qualifying ===
260 teams took part in the first qualifying round, with 136 teams having progressed from the previous round. The lowest level teams competing were from level 11 of the English football league system. The draws were regionalized on a North/South basis.

Tie	Home team	Score	Away team	Att.
1	Carlisle City (10)	2–6	Morpeth Town (9)	52
2	Workington (7)	W.O.	Ryton & Crawcrook Albion (10)	n/a
3	Shildon (9)	4–2	Darlington (6)	
4	Stockton Town (9)	0–2	Spennymoor Town (6)	168
5	South Shields (8)	10–0	Chester-Le-Street Town (10)	124
6	Ashton United (7)	W.O.	Altrincham (7)	n/a
7	Irlam (9)	0–6	Prescot Cables (8)	85
8	Warrington Town (7)	1–0 (a.e.t.)	Colne (8)	53
9	Vauxhall Motors (11)	2–1	Ashton Athletic (9)	
10	Nantwich Town (7)	3–1	Southport (6)	125
11	Abbey Hey (9)	3–1	Ashton Town (11)	42
12	Marine (7)	2–6	Bootle (9)	84
13	Burscough (9)	0–6	FC United Of Manchester (6)	60
14	Stalybridge Celtic (7)	1–5	Nelson (10)	34
15	Hyde United (8)	3–1	Stockport Town (10)	75
16	Daisy Hill (10)	1–4	Salford City (6)	133
17	Rossington Main (10)	2–0	AFC Emley (10)	32
18	Harrogate Railway Athletic (9)	6–1	Nostell Miners Welfare (10)	41
19	Farsley Celtic (7)	0–12	Handsworth Parramore (9)	34
20	York City (6)	5–0	Harrogate Town (6)	
21	Bottesford Town (9)	3–1	Worksop Town (9)	
22	Ossett Albion (8)	6–3	Staveley Miners Welfare (9)	59
23	Selby Town (10)	W.O.	Sheffield (8)	n/a
24	Maltby Main (9)	4–1	Silsden (10)	
25	Matlock Town (7)	0–1	Alfreton Town (6)	
26	Blaby & Whetstone Athletic (10)	0–7	Aylestone Park (10)	40
27	Sandiacre Town (11)	4–1	Buxton (7)	
28	Belper Town (8)	3–2	Eastwood Community (11)	
29	West Bridgford (10)	3–4	Long Eaton United (9)	100
30	Bourne Town (10)	1–7	Harborough Town (9)	65
31	Basford United (8)	0–3	Dunkirk (10)	130
32	Gresley (8)	0–4	Boston United (6)	
33	Newcastle Town (8)	3–1	Boldmere St Michaels (9)	81
34	Worcester City (9)	4–4 (a.e.t.) (5–3 p)	Bilston Town (10)	61
35	Nuneaton Town (6)	2–0	Stratford Town (7)	54
36	Romulus (8)	1–4	Walsall Wood (10)	60
37	Halesowen Town (7)	2–1	Kidderminster Harriers (6)	121
38	Tamworth (6)	3–2	Leek Town (8)	
39	AFC Telford United (6)	2–1 (a.e.t.)	Lichfield City (10)	68
40	Hereford (7)	1–2 (a.e.t.)	Stourbridge (7)	92
41	Malvern Town (10)	W.O.	Sutton Coldfield Town (7)	n/a
42	Ellesmere Rangers (10)	3–4	Dudley Town (10)	39
43	Bedworth United (8)	5–2	Pegasus Juniors (10)	17
44	Evesham United (8)	4–0	Eccleshall (10)	54
45	Wellingborough Town (9)	2–1	Kempston Rovers (8)	
46	AFC Dunstable (8)	5–1	Brackley Town (6)	76
47	AFC Rushden & Diamonds (8)	3–2	Rothwell Corinthians (9)	
48	Kettering Town (7)	1–3	St Ives Town (7)	47
49	Biggleswade Town (7)	4–0	Biggleswade United (9)	
50	Peterborough Sports (8)	3–4	Corby Town (8)	
51	Godmanchester Rovers (9)	1–1 (a.e.t.) (4–5 p)	Peterborough Northern Star (9)	
52	Brantham Athletic (9)	2–4	Woodbridge Town (10)	
53	Ely City (9)	1–12	Needham Market (7)	
54	Haverhill Rovers (9)	2–0	Cornard United (10)	31
55	Gorleston (9)	1–0	Wroxham (9)	79
56	March Town United (10)	4–1	Swaffham Town (10)	55
57	Cambridge City (8)	7–0	Hadleigh United (9)	64
58	Leiston (7)	1–0	Mildenhall Town (8)	67
59	Ipswich Wanderers (9)	0–7	AFC Sudbury (8)	92
60	Stowmarket Town (9)	3–8	Dereham Town (8)	68
61	Coggeshall Town (9)	3–0	St Margaretsbury (9)	
62	Barking (8)	6–0	Chelmsford City (6)	78
63	Tilbury (8)	W.O.	Codicote (10)	n/a
64	Royston Town (7)	0–2	Bishop's Stortford (7)	
65	Thurrock (7)	7–2	Clapton (9)	82

Tie	Home team	Score	Away team	Att.
66	East Thurrock United (6)	1–3	FC Broxbourne Borough (10)	110
67	Cheshunt (8)	5–0	Hullbridge Sports (9)	91
68	Hadley (9)	1–3	Tower Hamlets (9)	54
69	Romford (8)	1–0	Witham Town (8)	54
70	Brentwood Town (8)	1–3	AFC Hornchurch (8)	93
71	Braintree Town (5)	1–5	Hoddesdon Town (9)	
72	Concord Rangers (6)	3–4	Hitchin Town (7)	65
73	Saffron Walden Town (9)	3–1	Brightlingsea Regent (7)	100
74	Hendon (7)	4–2 (a.e.t.)	Aylesbury (8)	41
75	Staines Town (7)	5–2	Hanwell Town (8)	52
76	Bedfont Sports (9)	2–3 (a.e.t.)	St Albans City (6)	31
77	Sandhurst Town (10)	1–7	Kings Langley (7)	
78	Wingate & Finchley (7)	4–1	Ashford Town (8)	68
79	Hayes & Yeading United (8)	7–1	Brimsdown (10)	46
80	Enfield Town (7)	5–0	CB Hounslow United (9)	51
81	Edgware Town (9)	10–2	Harefield United (10)	46
82	Chesham United (7)	4–3 (a.e.t.)	Northwood (8)	51
83	Buckingham Athletic (10)	3–1	Flackwell Heath (9)	
84	Hemel Hempstead Town (6)	2–0	Uxbridge (8)	40
85	Lewisham Borough (Community) (10)	4–2	Lordswood (9)	64
86	Ashford United (8)	1–5	Folkestone Invicta (7)	62
87	Carshalton Athletic (8)	3–2 (a.e.t.)	Dulwich Hamlet (7)	102
88	Eastbourne Borough (6)	0–1	Welling United (6)	92
89	Croydon (9)	3–2	AFC Croydon Athletic (9)	73
90	Margate (7)	3–0	Hollands & Blair (9)	60
91	Tooting & Mitcham United (7)	1–3	Cray Wanderers (8)	
92	Tonbridge Angels (7)	W.O.	Greenwich Borough (8)	n/a
93	Phoenix Sports (8)	2–1	Dartford (6)	
94	Faversham Town (8)	1–6	Chipstead (8)	
95	Kingstonian (7)	6–1	Mile Oak (10)	46
96	Whyteleafe (8)	4–2	South Park (8)	
97	Burgess Hill Town (7)	2–0	Haywards Heath Town (9)	41
98	Crowborough Athletic (9)	1–6	Three Bridges (9)	
99	Leatherhead (7)	7–0	Wick (9)	35
100	Arundel (9)	W.O.	Lewes (8)	n/a
101	Knaphill (9)	1–2	Ash United (10)	106
102	Hastings United (8)	2–1	Abbey Rangers (9)	
103	Walton & Hersham (9)	2–4	Hampton & Richmond Borough (6)	50
104	Worthing United (9)	1–5	Bognor Regis Town (6)	56
105	Redhill (9)	1–4	Camberley Town (9)	
106	Corinthian Casuals (8)	1–7	Whitehawk (6)	67
107	Steyning Town (10)	6–2	Chessington & Hook United (10)	45
108	Hartley Wintney (8)	1–3	Holmer Green (9)	
109	Fleet Town (8)	3–1	Fleet Spurs (10)	77
110	Andover Town (9)	2–3	Hungerford Town (6)	85
111	Didcot Town (8)	1–4	Oxford City (6)	84
112	Windsor (9)	4–0	Alton Town (10)	
113	Clanfield (10)	5–2 (a.e.t.)	Bracknell Town (9)	
114	Thame United (8)	5–2	Binfield (9)	
115	Thatcham Town (9)	1–3 (a.e.t.)	Marlow (8)	
116	Salisbury (8)	3–2	Winchester City (8)	71
117	Brockenhurst (9)	4–6 (a.e.t.)	AFC Totton (8)	
118	Farnborough (7)	W.O.	Fareham Town (9)	n/a
119	Team Solent (9)	4–2	AFC Stoneham (10)	
120	AFC Portchester (9)	1–1 (a.e.t.) (4–3 p)	Romsey Town (10)	
121	Sholing (9)	3–1	Wimborne Town (8)	105
122	Cirencester Town (8)	2–4	Chippenham Town (6)	57
123	Gloucester City (6)	6–0	Bishop's Cleeve (8)	
124	New College Swindon (10)	1–3	Malmesbury Victoria (10)	
125	Tuffley Rovers (9)	2–3	Yate Town (8)	54
126	Welton Rovers (10)	4–7 (a.e.t.)	Wells City (9)	
127	Tavistock (10)	3–1	Elburton Villa (11)	
128	Bath City (6)	3–2 (a.e.t.)	Radstock Town (10)	
129	Odd Down (9)	4–0	Wellington (9)	37
130	Clevedon Town (9)	5–2	Weston-Super-Mare (6)	

=== Second round qualifying ===
152 teams took part in the second qualifying round, with 65 teams having progressed from the previous round.

Tie	Home team	Score	Away team	Att.
1	Barrow (5)	1–5	Gateshead (5)	159
2	South Shields (8)	1–2	Spennymoor Town (6)	277
3	Shildon (9)	3–0	Workington (7)	
4	Morpeth Town (9)	0–3	Hartlepool United (5)	78
5	Nelson (10)	8–0	Hyde United (8)	
6	Nantwich Town (7)	0–1	Tranmere Rovers (5)	223
7	Prescot Cables (8)	3–1 (a.e.t.)	FC United Of Manchester (6)	
8	Bootle (9)	2–3	Altrincham (7)	
9	AFC Fylde (5)	1–3	Chester (5)	
10	Salford City (6)	2–1	Warrington Town (7)	129
11	Vauxhall Motors (11)	0–4	Wrexham (5)	
12	FC Halifax Town (5)	4–1	Abbey Hey (9)	113
13	Handsworth Parramore (9)	2–1	Ossett Albion (8)	88
14	Rossington Main (10)	0–5	Guiseley (5)	63
15	Sheffield (8)	0–3	Alfreton Town (6)	104
16	York City (6)	3–1	Harrogate Railway Athletic (9)	186
17	Maltby Main (9)	1–6	Bottesford Town (9)	59
18	Belper Town (8)	1–0	Sandiacre Town (11)	
19	Tamworth (6)	3–1	Boston United (6)	
20	Dunkirk (10)	7–1	Harborough Town (9)	43
21	Long Eaton United (9)	2–1	Aylestone Park (10)	74
22	Worcester City (9)	0–1	Sutton Coldfield Town (7)	48
23	Evesham United (8)	4–0	Walsall Wood (10)	77
24	Newcastle Town (8)	1–3	Bedworth United (8)	
25	Solihull Moors (5)	0–2	Nuneaton Town (6)	87
26	Halesowen Town (7)	0–2	AFC Telford United (6)	73
27	Stourbridge (7)	3–0	Dudley Town (10)	
28	Corby Town (8)	1–2 (a.e.t.)	AFC Rushden & Diamonds (8)	128
29	AFC Dunstable (8)	1–0	St Ives Town (7)	
30	Biggleswade Town (7)	2–0	Wellingborough Town (9)	47
31	Haverhill Rovers (9)	0–2	Cambridge City (8)	
32	Woodbridge Town (10)	6–1	Peterborough Northern Star (9)	58
33	Leiston (7)	1–0	Dereham Town (8)	59
34	Gorleston (9)	3–2	Needham Market (7)	50
35	AFC Sudbury (8)	5–0	March Town United (10)	46
36	Tower Hamlets (9)	0–3	Leyton Orient (5)	218
37	AFC Hornchurch (8)	4–1	FC Broxbourne Borough (10)	90
38	Dagenham & Redbridge (5)	6–0	Coggeshall Town (9)	117

Tie	Home team	Score	Away team	Att.
39	Cheshunt (8)	4–1 (a.e.t.)	Romford (8)	88
40	Saffron Walden Town (9)	2–3	Hitchin Town (7)	113
41	Thurrock (7)	0–2	Bishop's Stortford (7)	
42	Barking (8)	0–2 (a.e.t.)	Hoddesdon Town (9)	
43	Hampton & Richmond Borough (6)	3–2	Codicote (10)	
44	Edgware Town (9)	1–2	Wingate & Finchley (7)	49
45	Boreham Wood (5)	2–1	Hendon (7)	103
46	Hayes & Yeading United (8)	2–3	Enfield Town (7)	27
47	Hemel Hempstead Town (6)	6–0	Chesham United (7)	57
48	Kings Langley (7)	2–8	St Albans City (6)	88
49	Staines Town (7)	3–2	Carshalton Athletic (8)	52
50	Ebbsfleet United (5)	0–2	Phoenix Sports (8)	167
51	Chipstead (8)	4–1	Lewisham Borough (Community) (10)	56
52	Dover Athletic (5)	1–0	Cray Wanderers (8)	81
53	Bromley (5)	3–1	Maidstone United (5)	286
54	Folkestone Invicta (7)	0–2	Welling United (6)	
55	Greenwich Borough (8)	0–4	Margate (7)	81
56	Whitehawk (6)	3–1	Woking (5)	70
57	Camberley Town (9)	4–0	Three Bridges (9)	70
58	Sutton United (5)	2–1	Croydon (9)	
59	Leatherhead (7)	1–2 (a.e.t.)	Lewes (8)	51
60	Bognor Regis Town (6)	0–3	Hastings United (8)	63
61	Burgess Hill Town (7)	3–2	Whyteleafe (8)	53
62	Kingstonian (7)	1–2	Steyning Town (10)	50
63	Windsor (9)	4–7 (a.e.t.)	Buckingham Athletic (10)	70
64	Marlow (8)	2–0	Thame United (8)	51
65	Clanfield (10)	4–2	Oxford City (6)	46
66	Holmer Green (9)	2–1 (a.e.t.)	Maidenhead United (5)	33
67	Fleet Town (8)	4–1	AFC Portchester (9)	50
68	Ash United (10)	4–2	Farnborough (7)	115
69	Eastleigh (5)	3–1	Malmesbury Victoria (10)	84
70	Aldershot Town (5)	5–3	Hungerford Town (6)	72
71	Salisbury (8)	1–4	AFC Totton (8)	93
72	Team Solent (9)	2–2 (a.e.t.) (7–8 p)	Sholing (9)	71
73	Wells City (9)	4–3	Yate Town (8)	
74	Chippenham Town (6)	1–2	Clevedon Town (9)	52
75	Odd Down (9)	1–2	Bath City (6)	74
76	Tavistock (10)	1–3	Gloucester City (6)	47

=== Third round qualifying ===
76 teams took part in the third qualifying round, with 38 teams having progressed from the previous round.

Tie	Home team	Score	Away team	Att.
1	Gateshead (5)	2–3	Wrexham (5)	
2	Nelson (10)	1–2	Prescot Cables (8)	
3	Altrincham (7)	1–3	Chester (5)	
4	York City (6)	0–1	Salford City (6)	
5	Spennymoor Town (6)	0–1	Tranmere Rovers (5)	
6	Shildon (9)	1–3	Guiseley (5)	121
7	Hartlepool United (5)	2–1	FC Halifax Town (5)	240
8	Nuneaton Town (6)	1–2	Long Eaton United (9)	126
9	Belper Town (8)	2–3	Bottesford Town (9)	
10	Dunkirk (10)	2–1	AFC Rushden & Diamonds (8)	63
11	Handsworth Parramore (9)	2–1	AFC Telford United (6)	88
12	Evesham United (8)	2–0	Bedworth United (8)	100
13	Sutton Coldfield Town (7)	0–2	Stourbridge (7)	78
14	Tamworth (6)	2–0	Alfreton Town (6)	
15	Cambridge City (8)	1–0 (a.e.t.)	Leiston (7)	90
16	Gorleston (9)	1–7	Dagenham & Redbridge (5)	235
17	Hitchin Town (7)	6–1	Hoddesdon Town (9)	184
18	Woodbridge Town (10)	0–2	Bishop's Stortford (7)	75
19	Leyton Orient (5)	4–0	AFC Hornchurch (8)	285

Tie	Home team	Score	Away team	Att.
20	Cheshunt (8)	5–2	AFC Sudbury (8)	
21	Holmer Green (9)	0–0 (a.e.t.) (4–5 p)	Marlow (8)	
22	Buckingham Athletic (10)	7–1	Hampton & Richmond Borough (6)	
23	St Albans City (6)	0–2	Biggleswade Town (7)	76
24	Clanfield (10)	0–0 (a.e.t.) (5–3 p)	Hemel Hempstead Town (6)	66
25	Boreham Wood (5)	2–0	Enfield Town (7)	
26	Wingate & Finchley (7)	2–0	AFC Dunstable (8)	
27	Phoenix Sports (8)	3–4	Whitehawk (6)	203
28	Chipstead (8)	4–2	Sutton United (5)	98
29	Hastings United (8)	1–2	Bromley (5)	
30	Margate (7)	3–0	Staines Town (7)	73
31	Lewes (8)	3–0	Steyning Town (10)	
32	Camberley Town (9)	3–1	Burgess Hill Town (7)	98
33	Welling United (6)	1–1 (a.e.t.) (2–1 p)	Dover Athletic (5)	
34	Eastleigh (5)	3–0	Wells City (9)	90
35	Bath City (6)	3–4	Clevedon Town (9)	116
36	Aldershot Town (5)	2–2 (a.e.t.) (3–4 p)	Sholing (9)	
37	Fleet Town (8)	0–2	Gloucester City (6)	
38	AFC Totton (8)	2–2 (a.e.t.) (5–4 p)	Ash United (10)	

== First round ==
84 teams took part in the first round, with 19 teams having progressed from the previous round.

Tie	Home team	Score	Away team	Att.
1	Tranmere Rovers (5)	0–1	Blackburn Rovers (3)	251
2	Morecambe (4)	0–4	Wigan Athletic (3)	168
3	Carlisle United (4)	5-1	Prescot Cables (8)	150
4	Bradford City (3)	0–3	Blackpool (3)	248
5	Oldham Athletic (3)	0–3	Bury (3)	299
6	Accrington Stanley (4)	1–0	Rochdale (3)	200
7	Hartlepool United (5)	3–1	Chester (5)	228
8	Guiseley (5)	0–0 (a.e.t.) (3–4 p)	Fleetwood Town (3)	161
9	Wrexham (5)	2–2 (a.e.t.) (5–4 p)	Salford City (6)	146
10	Evesham United (8)	0–3†	Shrewsbury Town (3)	219
11	Rotherham United (3)	7–0	Bottesford Town (9)	303
12	Doncaster Rovers (3)	4–3	Walsall (3)	200
13	Dunkirk (10)	0–2	Tamworth (6)	109
14	Stourbridge (7)	2–3 (a.e.t.)	Port Vale (4)	353
15	Grimsby Town (4)	0–1	Mansfield Town (4)	152
16	Long Eaton United (9)	0–3	Scunthorpe United (3)	188
17	Chesterfield (4)	3–1	Notts County (4)	200
18	Lincoln City (4)	1–2	Coventry City (4)	345
19	Handsworth Parramore (9)	0–2	Crewe Alexandra (4)	204
20	Barnet (4)	4–0	Wingate & Finchley (7)	256
21	Colchester United (4)	5–4	Cheshunt (8)	227

Tie	Home team	Score	Away team	Att.
22	Milton Keynes Dons (3)	1–0	Southend United (3)	372
23	Leyton Orient (5)	5–0	Biggleswade Town (7)	237
24	Peterborough United (3)	1–2 (a.e.t.)	Cambridge United (4)	612
25	Hitchin Town (7)	4–6	Dagenham & Redbridge (5)	256
26	Buckingham Athletic (10)	2–4	Northampton Town (3)	345
27	Clanfield (10)	2–1	Cambridge City (8)	162
28	Luton Town (4)	1–2	Stevenage (4)	392
29	Bishop's Stortford (7)	3–1	Boreham Wood (5)	157
30	Charlton Athletic (3)	4–1	Whitehawk (6)	167
31	Bromley (5)	2–0	Chipstead (8)	218
32	Marlow (8)	0–3	AFC Wimbledon (3)	231
33	Welling United (6)	3–1	Margate (7)	113
34	Gillingham (3)	1–2 (a.e.t.)	Portsmouth (3)	217
35	Lewes (8)	4–3	Camberley Town (9)	88
36	Bristol Rovers (3)	1–1 (a.e.t.) (3–1 p)	Forest Green Rovers (4)	321
37	Swindon Town (4)	6–2	Newport County (4)	251
38	AFC Totton (8)	0–9	Cheltenham Town (4)	129
39	Plymouth Argyle (3)	7–2	Eastleigh (5)	225
40	Sholing (9)	2–0	Clevedon Town (9)	227
41	Gloucester City (6)	1–2 (a.e.t.)	Oxford United (3)	153
42	Yeovil Town (4)	0–3	Exeter City (4)	209

† Despite winning the match, Shrewsbury Town were subsequently disqualified after it was found that they had fielded an ineligible player. Evesham United were therefore permitted to advance to the next round instead.

== Second round ==
Tie	Home team	Score	Away team	Att.
1	Evesham United (8)	0–4	Crewe Alexandra (4)	205
2	Cambridge United (4)	0–1	Scunthorpe United (3)	231
3	Chesterfield (4)	2–1	Port Vale (4)	200
4	Wigan Athletic (3)	1–3	Bury (3)	155
5	Blackburn Rovers (3)	3–1	Wrexham (5)	338
6	Accrington Stanley (4)	2–3	Coventry City (4)	174
7	Carlisle United (4)	0–2	Hartlepool United (5)	167
8	Tamworth (6)	1–2 (a.e.t.)	Fleetwood Town (3)	100
9	Rotherham United (3)	0–1	Mansfield Town (4)	335
10	Doncaster Rovers (3)	0–2	Blackpool (3)	200
11	Colchester United (4)	5–0	Bishop's Stortford (7)	294

Tie	Home team	Score	Away team	Att.
12	Swindon Town (4)	1–0	Northampton Town (3)	281
13	Plymouth Argyle (3)	3–2	AFC Wimbledon (3)	252
14	Exeter City (4)	3–2	Charlton Athletic (3)	463
15	Cheltenham Town (4)	2–0 (a.e.t.)	Welling United (6)	227
16	Oxford United (3)	3–1	Bristol Rovers (3)	344
17	Portsmouth (3)	3–1	Lewes (8)	474
18	Dagenham & Redbridge (5)	7–1	Clanfield (10)	150
19	Leyton Orient (5)	5–0	Sholing (9)	254
20	Barnet (4)	1–3	Milton Keynes Dons (3)	246
21	Bromley (5)	1–4	Stevenage (4)	262

== Third round ==
Tie	Home team	Score	Away team	Att.
1	Sheffield United (2)	2–0	Burton Albion (2)	337
2	Queens Park Rangers (2)	1–3	Charlton Athletic (3)	337
3	Tottenham Hotspur	5–0	Preston North End (2)	78
4	Mansfield Town (4)	2–2 (5–6 p)	Crystal Palace	450
5	Burnley	1–0	Leeds United (2)	328
6	Cheltenham Town (4)	1–2	Bury (3)	172
7	Brighton & Hove Albion	0–5	Newcastle United	253
8	Oxford United (3)	0–3	Dagenham & Redbridge (5)	233
9	Blackburn Rovers (3)	2–1	Stoke City	252
10	Fleetwood Town (3)	1–5	Stevenage (4)	251
11	West Bromwich Albion	4–0	Leyton Orient (5)	206
12	Plymouth Argyle (3)	0–0 (6–5 p)	Manchester City	1,842
13	Huddersfield Town	1–1 (3–4 p)	Fulham (2)	173
14	AFC Bournemouth	3–0	Hull City (2)	545
15	Portsmouth (3)	1–2 (a.e.t.)	Leicester City	603
16	Chelsea	4–0	Scunthorpe United (3)	107

Tie	Home team	Score	Away team	Att.
17	Watford	1–0	Sunderland (2)	227
18	Swindon Town (4)	1–3	Nottingham Forest (2)	178
19	Milton Keynes Dons (3)	1–0	Cardiff City (2)	265
20	Swansea City	2–0	Chesterfield (4)	69
21	Middlesbrough (2)	2–0	Bolton Wanderers	254
22	Reading (2)	2–1	Millwall (2)	379
23	Derby County (2)	2–2 (3–1 p)	Manchester United	326
24	Norwich City (2)	4–1	Barnsley (2)	250
25	Everton	1–2	Ipswich Town (2)	129
26	Bristol City (2)	1–2	Birmingham City (2)	230
27	Colchester United (4)	2–0	Crewe Alexandra (4)	153
28	West Ham United	0–1	Blackpool (3)	265
29	Southampton	4–1	Wolverhampton Wanderers (2)	312
30	Arsenal	2–1	Sheffield Wednesday (2)	343
31	Aston Villa (2)	2–1	Coventry City (3)	482
32	Hartlepool United (5)	1–5	Liverpool	989

== Fourth round ==
Tie	Home team	Score	Away team	Att.
1	Liverpool	2–3 (a.e.t.)	Arsenal	
2	Burnley	0–1	Plymouth Argyle (3)	410
3	Crystal Palace	2–3 (a.e.t.)	Newcastle United	1,774
4	Blackpool (3)	1–1 (4–2 p)	Southampton	223
5	Stevenage (4)	1–2	Middlesbrough (2)	636
6	Chelsea	7–0	West Bromwich Albion	157
7	Ipswich Town (2)	2–1	Dagenham & Redbridge (5)	585
8	Charlton Athletic (3)	3–4	Reading (2)	279

Tie	Home team	Score	Away team	Att.
9	Bury (3)	1–0	Aston Villa (2)	502
10	Colchester United (4)	2–0	Milton Keynes Dons (3)	262
11	Birmingham City (2)	1–0	Sheffield United (2)	553
12	Nottingham Forest (2)	1–1 (5–4 p)	Leicester City	654
13	Blackburn Rovers (3)	2–0	Watford	278
14	Swansea City	0–2	Fulham (2)	127
15	Norwich City (2)	4–2 (a.e.t.)	Derby County (2)	500
16	AFC Bournemouth	0–3	Tottenham Hotspur	1,362

== Fifth round ==
Tie	Home team	Score	Away team	Att.
1	Colchester United (4)	1–4*	Reading (2)	337
2	Plymouth Argyle (3)	1–3 (a.e.t.)	Fulham (2)	1,517
3	Bury (3)	1–3	Birmingham City (2)	637
4	Middlesbrough (2)	2–3	Arsenal	471

Tie	Home team	Score	Away team	Att.
5	Blackburn Rovers (3)	5–1	Nottingham Forest (2)	482
6	Norwich City (2)	4–3 (a.e.t.)	Newcastle United	1,000
7	Tottenham Hotspur	0–2	Chelsea	899
8	Ipswich Town (2)	0–2	Blackpool (3)	627

- Tie awarded to Colchester United - Reading removed after fielding an 'under-age' player inadvertently.

== Quarter-finals ==
Tie	Home team	Score	Away team	Att.
1	Fulham (2)	0–6	Chelsea	1,582
2	Norwich City (2)	1–3	Birmingham City (2)	1,500

Tie	Home team	Score	Away team	Att.
3	Colchester United (4)	1–5	Arsenal	918
4	Blackburn Rovers (3)	2–3	Blackpool (3)	526

== Semi-finals ==
Team 1	Agg.	Team 2	1st leg	2nd leg
Blackpool (3)	2–7	Arsenal	2–2	0-5
Birmingham City (2)	0–7	Chelsea	0–3	0–4

=== First leg ===
20 March 2018
19:45

Blackpool (3)	2-2	Arsenal
Sumner 43'; Jacobson 74'	Report	John-Jules 31'; Amaechi 64'

Bloomfield Road
Attendance: 894
Referee: Tim Robinson

4 April 2018
19:45

Birmingham (2)	0-3	Chelsea
		Tariq Uwakwe 15'; Hudson-Odoi 35'; Brown 76'

St. Andrew's
Attendance: 1,568

=== Second leg ===
10 April 2018
19:45

Chelsea	4-0	Birmingham City (2)
Hudson-Odoi 31', 41'; Brown 38'; Uwakwe 63'

Stamford Bridge
Attendance: 4,445

16 April 2018
19:45

Arsenal	5-0	Blackpool (3)
Balogun 18'; Ballard 20'; Burton 23'; Smith-Rowe 34' (pen.); Smith 90'	Report

Emirates Stadium
Attendance: 2,083
Referee: Craig Hicks

== Final ==
Team 1	Agg.	Team 2	1st leg	2nd leg
Chelsea	7–1	Arsenal	3–1	4–0

=== First leg ===
27 April 2018
19:45

Chelsea	3–1	Arsenal
Redan 67', 86'; Guehi 78'	Report	Amaechi 36'

Stamford Bridge
Attendance: 4,878
Referee: Tim Robinson

=== Second leg ===
30 April 2018
19:45

Arsenal	0–4	Chelsea
	Report	Gilmour 10'; Hudson-Odoi 55', 76'; Anjorin 67'

Emirates Stadium
Attendance: 3,877
Referee: Tim Robinson

== See also ==
- 2017–18 FA Cup
