= 2005–06 Eastern Counties Football League =

The 2005–06 season was the 64th in the history of Eastern Counties Football League a football competition in England.

Lowestoft Town were champions, winning their eleventh Eastern Counties Football League title, while Bury Town were promoted after ten seasons in the Eastern Counties Football League along with AFC Sudbury.

== Premier Division ==
Eastern Counties Football League Premier Division
- Season: 2005–06
- Champions: Lowestoft Town
- Promoted: Bury Town; AFC Sudbury
- Matches: 462
- Goals: 1,661 (3.6 per match)

The Premier Division featured 19 clubs which competed in the division last season, along with three new clubs, promoted from Division One:

- Ipswich Wanderers
- Kirkley
- Needham Market

=== League table ===
Pos	Team	Pld	W	D	L	GF	GA	GD	Pts	Promotion or relegation
1	Lowestoft Town	42	30	4	8	121	43	+78	94	
2	Bury Town	42	29	5	8	100	32	+68	92	Promoted to the Isthmian League
3	AFC Sudbury	42	28	5	9	114	56	+58	89	Promoted to the Isthmian League
4	Wisbech Town	42	25	7	10	98	55	+43	82	
5	Mildenhall Town	42	23	9	10	100	68	+32	78	
6	Needham Market	42	22	9	11	79	41	+38	75	
7	Ipswich Wanderers	42	23	6	13	69	38	+31	75	
8	Wroxham	42	21	6	15	77	62	+15	69	
9	Leiston	42	21	5	16	89	69	+20	68	
10	Soham Town Rangers	42	18	11	13	75	51	+24	65	
11	Diss Town	42	20	5	17	89	78	+11	65	
12	Dereham Town	42	18	10	14	99	64	+35	64	
13	Histon reserves	42	15	11	16	71	84	−13	56	
14	Kirkley	42	15	6	21	60	76	−16	51	
15	King's Lynn reserves	42	12	13	17	68	78	−10	49	
16	Woodbridge Town	42	14	6	22	64	83	−19	48	
17	Newmarket Town	42	13	6	23	53	91	−38	45	
18	Halstead Town	42	11	7	24	67	124	−57	40	
19	Cambridge City reserves	42	10	8	24	60	107	−47	38	Resigned from the league
20	Norwich United	42	10	6	26	47	82	−35	36	
21	Harwich & Parkeston	42	10	2	30	41	100	−59	32	
22	Clacton Town	42	0	1	41	20	179	−159	1	

Source: fchd
Rules for classification: 1) points; 2) goal difference; 3) number of goals scored.

== Division One ==
Eastern Counties Football League Division One
- Season: 2005–06
- Champions: Stanway Rovers
- Promoted: Felixstowe & Walton United; Stanway Rovers
- Matches: 462
- Goals: 1,566 (3.39 per match)

Division One featured 17 clubs which competed in the division last season, along with five new clubs:

- Debenham LC, joined from the Suffolk and Ipswich League
- Fulbourn Institute, joined from the Cambridgeshire League
- Gorleston, relegated from the Premier Division
- Great Yarmouth Town, relegated from the Premier Division
- Stowmarket Town, relegated from the Premier Division

=== League table ===
Pos	Team	Pld	W	D	L	GF	GA	GD	Pts	Promotion
1	Stanway Rovers	42	33	4	5	106	29	+77	103	Promoted to the Premier Division
2	Felixstowe & Walton United	42	30	5	7	107	48	+59	95	Promoted to the Premier Division
3	Fulbourn Institute	42	30	4	8	109	60	+49	94	Resigned to the Cambridgeshire League
4	Tiptree United	42	29	3	10	125	56	+69	90	
5	Walsham-le-Willows	42	23	10	9	91	46	+45	79	
6	Whitton United	42	22	7	13	83	63	+20	73	
7	Ely City	42	20	10	12	88	68	+20	70	
8	Haverhill Rovers	42	21	7	14	77	60	+17	70	
9	Swaffham Town	42	19	12	11	90	71	+19	69	
10	Debenham LC	42	17	10	15	60	70	−10	61	
11	Fakenham Town	42	15	11	16	64	69	−5	56	
12	Saffron Walden Town	42	14	12	16	56	62	−6	54	
13	Great Yarmouth Town	42	14	10	18	54	60	−6	52	
14	Godmanchester Rovers	42	12	10	20	53	73	−20	46	
15	Long Melford	42	9	11	22	59	84	−25	38	
16	Stowmarket Town	42	10	8	24	63	95	−32	38	
17	Cornard United	42	11	4	27	59	96	−37	37	
18	Gorleston	42	9	12	21	50	74	−24	35 (Note: Gorleston were deducted four points.)	
19	March Town United	42	9	6	27	46	91	−45	33	
20	Downham Town	42	8	9	25	41	99	−58	33	
21	Hadleigh United	42	6	13	23	38	78	−40	31	
22	Thetford Town	42	7	10	25	47	114	−67	31	

Source: fchd
Rules for classification: 1) points; 2) goal difference; 3) number of goals scored.
