= 2002–03 Eastern Counties Football League =

The 2002–03 season was the 61st in the history of Eastern Counties Football League a football competition in England.

AFC Sudbury were champions, winning their third Eastern Counties Football League title in a row after the new club was formed in 1999.

== Premier Division ==
Eastern Counties Football League Premier Division
- Season: 2002–03
- Champions: AFC Sudbury
- Relegated: Ely City; Harwich & Parkeston; Ipswich Wanderers
- Matches: 506
- Goals: 1,696 (3.35 per match)

The Premier Division featured 20 clubs which competed in the division last season, along with three new clubs:

- Histon reserves, promoted from Division One
- Norwich United, promoted from Division One
- Wisbech Town, relegated from the Southern League

=== League table ===
Pos	Team	Pld	W	D	L	GF	GA	GD	Pts	Promotion or relegation
1	AFC Sudbury	44	31	10	3	122	37	+85	103	
2	Wroxham	44	29	6	9	121	53	+68	93	
3	Soham Town Rangers	44	25	11	8	91	62	+29	86	
4	Lowestoft Town	44	25	7	12	108	65	+43	82	
5	Diss Town	44	26	3	15	98	62	+36	81	
6	Wisbech Town	44	23	9	12	101	73	+28	78	
7	Stowmarket Town	44	22	9	13	65	56	+9	75	
8	Great Yarmouth Town	44	19	11	14	67	57	+10	68	
9	Bury Town	44	18	11	15	75	66	+9	65	
10	Mildenhall Town	44	18	11	15	69	65	+4	64 (Note: Mildenhall Town were deducted one point.)	
11	Clacton Town	44	17	10	17	62	61	+1	61	
12	Tiptree United	44	17	7	20	73	90	−17	58	
13	Histon reserves	44	15	11	18	80	84	−4	56	
14	Fakenham Town	44	13	16	15	61	61	0	55	
15	Gorleston	44	13	10	21	79	91	−12	49	
16	Norwich United	44	13	10	21	44	63	−19	49	
17	Maldon Town	44	13	8	23	57	63	−6	47	
18	Newmarket Town	44	11	13	20	58	76	−18	46	
19	Dereham Town	44	12	9	23	55	86	−31	45	
20	Woodbridge Town	44	11	12	21	55	96	−41	45	
21	Ipswich Wanderers	44	11	8	25	59	92	−33	41	Relegated to Division One
22	Harwich & Parkeston	44	10	6	28	58	126	−68	36	Relegated to Division One
23	Ely City	44	5	10	29	38	111	−73	22 (Note: Ely City were deducted four points.)	Relegated to Division One

Source: fchd
Rules for classification: 1) points; 2) goal difference; 3) number of goals scored.

== Division One ==
Eastern Counties Football League Division One
- Season: 2002–03
- Champions: Halstead Town
- Promoted: Halstead Town; King's Lynn reserves
- Matches: 342
- Goals: 1,182 (3.46 per match)

Division One featured 15 clubs which competed in the division last season, along with four new clubs:

- Felixstowe & Walton United, relegated from the Premier Division
- Godmanchester Rovers, joined from the Cambridgeshire League
- Long Melford, joined from the Essex and Suffolk Border League
- Swaffham Town, relegated from the Premier Division

=== League table ===
Pos	Team	Pld	W	D	L	GF	GA	GD	Pts	Promotion
1	Halstead Town	36	24	7	5	76	37	+39	79	Promoted to the Premier Division
2	King's Lynn reserves	36	24	4	8	108	56	+52	76	Promoted to the Premier Division
3	Whitton United	36	21	8	7	93	44	+49	71	
4	Hadleigh United	36	20	9	7	65	40	+25	69	
5	Stanway Rovers	36	19	10	7	78	39	+39	67	
6	Long Melford	36	18	10	8	69	38	+31	64	
7	Leiston	36	18	9	9	76	51	+25	63	
8	Swaffham Town	36	18	3	15	62	62	0	57	
9	Cambridge City reserves	36	16	7	13	67	49	+18	55	
10	Haverhill Rovers	36	16	6	14	67	55	+12	54	
11	Needham Market	36	15	8	13	71	59	+12	53	
12	Godmanchester Rovers	36	10	13	13	53	53	0	43	
13	Cornard United	36	11	5	20	44	70	−26	38	
14	Somersham Town	36	11	5	20	59	87	−28	38	
15	March Town United	36	9	10	17	54	86	−32	37	
16	Felixstowe & Walton United	36	10	6	20	51	71	−20	36	
17	Thetford Town	36	9	5	22	38	74	−36	32	
18	Downham Town	36	4	6	26	33	88	−55	18	
19	Warboys Town	36	2	3	31	18	123	−105	9	

Source: fchd
Rules for classification: 1) points; 2) goal difference; 3) number of goals scored.
