= 2001–02 Eastern Counties Football League =

The 2001–02 season was the 60th in the history of Eastern Counties Football League a football competition in England.

AFC Sudbury were champions, winning their second Eastern Counties Football League title in a row after the new club was formed in 1999.

== Premier Division ==
Eastern Counties Football League Premier Division
- Season: 2001–02
- Champions: AFC Sudbury
- Relegated: Felixstowe & Walton United; Swaffham Town
- Matches: 462
- Goals: 1,530 (3.31 per match)

The Premier Division featured 20 clubs which competed in the division last season, along with two new clubs, promoted from Division One:

- Dereham Town
- Swaffham Town

=== League table ===
Pos	Team	Pld	W	D	L	GF	GA	GD	Pts	Promotion or relegation
1	AFC Sudbury	42	32	4	6	139	54	+85	100	
2	Wroxham	42	29	6	7	113	47	+66	93	
3	Lowestoft Town	42	24	8	10	106	55	+51	80	
4	Clacton Town	42	20	16	6	83	41	+42	76	
5	Gorleston	42	21	8	13	78	69	+9	71	
6	Stowmarket Town	42	20	10	12	75	64	+11	70	
7	Bury Town	42	19	7	16	70	53	+17	64	
8	Woodbridge Town	42	16	14	12	62	61	+1	62	
9	Ely City	42	19	5	18	71	72	−1	62	
10	Maldon Town	42	17	10	15	78	78	0	61	
11	Mildenhall Town	42	18	7	17	68	68	0	61	
12	Dereham Town	42	16	7	19	59	64	−5	55	
13	Soham Town Rangers	42	16	8	18	68	80	−12	55 (Note: Soham Town Rangers were deducted one point.)	
14	Fakenham Town	42	13	13	16	59	66	−7	52	
15	Tiptree United	42	13	10	19	53	69	−16	49	
16	Diss Town	42	14	7	21	66	84	−18	49	
17	Great Yarmouth Town	42	13	9	20	41	65	−24	48	
18	Harwich & Parkeston	42	13	5	24	46	81	−35	44	
19	Newmarket Town	42	10	13	19	65	89	−24	43	
20	Ipswich Wanderers	42	11	8	23	53	69	−16	41	
21	Felixstowe & Walton United	42	7	9	26	38	88	−50	30	Relegated to Division One
22	Swaffham Town	42	7	4	31	39	113	−74	25	Relegated to Division One

Source: fchd
Rules for classification: 1) points; 2) goal difference; 3) number of goals scored.

== Division One ==
Eastern Counties Football League Division One
- Season: 2001–02
- Champions: Norwich United
- Promoted: Norwich United; Histon reserves
- Matches: 342
- Goals: 1,206 (3.53 per match)

Division One featured 14 clubs which competed in the division last season, along with five new clubs:

- Halstead Town, relegated from the Premier Division
- Histon reserves
- King's Lynn reserves
- Leiston, joined from the Suffolk and Ipswich League
- Warboys Town, relegated from the Premier Division

=== League table ===
Pos	Team	Pld	W	D	L	GF	GA	GD	Pts	Promotion
1	Norwich United	36	25	7	4	83	22	+61	82	Promoted to the Premier Division
2	Histon reserves	36	25	4	7	99	34	+65	79	Promoted to the Premier Division
3	Haverhill Rovers	36	23	7	6	85	31	+54	76	
4	Leiston	36	24	4	8	74	36	+38	76	
5	Needham Market	36	22	5	9	79	42	+37	71	
6	King's Lynn reserves	36	19	8	9	84	44	+40	65	
7	Stanway Rovers	36	18	5	13	72	52	+20	59	
8	Somersham Town	36	15	8	13	51	60	−9	53	
9	Wisbech Town reserves	36	15	5	16	58	64	−6	50	Resigned from the league
10	Cambridge City reserves	36	13	7	16	79	67	+12	46	
11	Cornard United	36	14	3	19	60	73	−13	45	
12	Whitton United	36	12	6	18	49	58	−9	42	
13	Halstead Town	36	11	8	17	53	68	−15	41	
14	Hadleigh United	36	11	8	17	51	72	−21	41	
15	Downham Town	36	11	5	20	60	82	−22	38	
16	Warboys Town	36	9	7	20	38	75	−37	34	
17	Brightlingsea United	36	9	4	23	49	105	−56	31	Resigned to the Essex and Suffolk Border League
18	Thetford Town	36	7	6	23	37	97	−60	27	
19	March Town United	36	3	5	28	45	124	−79	14	

Source: fchd
Rules for classification: 1) points; 2) goal difference; 3) number of goals scored.
