= 2003–04 Eastern Counties Football League =

The 2003–04 season was the 62nd in the history of Eastern Counties Football League a football competition in England.

AFC Sudbury were champions, winning their fourth Eastern Counties Football League title in a row after the new club was formed in 1999, while Maldon Town were promoted to the Southern Football League for the first time in their history.

== Premier Division ==
Eastern Counties Football League Premier Division
- Season: 2003–04
- Champions: AFC Sudbury
- Promoted: Maldon Town
- Relegated: Fakenham Town; Tiptree United
- Matches: 462
- Goals: 1,541 (3.34 per match)

The Premier Division featured 20 clubs which competed in the division last season, along with two new clubs, promoted from Division One:

- Halstead Town
- King's Lynn reserves

=== League table ===
Pos	Team	Pld	W	D	L	GF	GA	GD	Pts	Promotion or relegation
1	AFC Sudbury	42	32	5	5	123	30	+93	101	
2	Maldon Town	42	30	6	6	107	35	+72	96	Promoted to the Southern League
3	Wroxham	42	29	8	5	108	36	+72	95	
4	Diss Town	42	27	5	10	104	54	+50	86	
5	Soham Town Rangers	42	24	8	10	88	62	+26	80	
6	Clacton Town	42	19	14	9	65	54	+11	71	
7	Halstead Town	42	19	9	14	77	54	+23	66	
8	Lowestoft Town	42	19	8	15	66	68	−2	65	
9	Bury Town	42	17	11	14	86	82	+4	62	
10	Newmarket Town	42	18	7	17	76	78	−2	61	
11	Norwich United	42	17	10	15	51	58	−7	61	
12	Mildenhall Town	42	16	12	14	72	61	+11	60	
13	Histon reserves	42	14	10	18	70	77	−7	52	
14	Wisbech Town	42	13	8	21	64	82	−18	46 (Note: Wisbech Town were deducted one point.)	
15	King's Lynn reserves	42	11	11	20	63	71	−8	44	
16	Great Yarmouth Town	42	10	13	19	59	67	−8	43	
17	Woodbridge Town	42	12	6	24	52	78	−26	42	
18	Dereham Town	42	10	9	23	42	85	−43	39	
19	Stowmarket Town	42	11	6	25	42	88	−46	39	
20	Gorleston	42	9	10	23	56	86	−30	37	
21	Tiptree United	42	9	7	26	40	95	−55	34	Relegated to Division One
22	Fakenham Town	42	2	5	35	30	140	−110	11	Relegated to Division One

Source: fchd
Rules for classification: 1) points; 2) goal difference; 3) number of goals scored.

== Division One ==
Eastern Counties Football League Division One
- Season: 2003–04
- Champions: Cambridge City reserves
- Promoted: Cambridge City reserves Harwich & Parkeston; Leiston
- Matches: 380
- Goals: 1,238 (3.26 per match)

Division One featured 17 clubs which competed in the division last season, along with four new clubs:

- Ely City, relegated from the Premier Division
- Harwich & Parkeston, relegated from the Premier Division
- Ipswich Wanderers, relegated from the Premier Division
- Kirkley, joined from the Anglian Combination

=== League table ===
Pos	Team	Pld	W	D	L	GF	GA	GD	Pts	Promotion
1	Cambridge City reserves	38	25	8	5	76	40	+36	83	Promoted to the Premier Division
2	Harwich & Parkeston	38	24	8	6	89	48	+41	80	Promoted to the Premier Division
3	Leiston	38	22	8	8	74	40	+34	74	Promoted to the Premier Division
4	Stanway Rovers	38	20	10	8	69	43	+26	70	
5	Kirkley	38	18	10	10	84	60	+24	64	
6	Whitton United	38	19	5	14	85	57	+28	62	
7	Godmanchester Rovers	38	17	8	13	54	52	+2	59	
8	Ipswich Wanderers	38	17	9	12	51	36	+15	58 (Note: Ipswich Wanderers were deducted two points.)	
9	Swaffham Town	38	15	13	10	62	54	+8	58	
10	Haverhill Rovers	38	17	5	16	73	66	+7	56	
11	Ely City	38	19	1	18	60	58	+2	55 (Note: Ely City were deducted three points.)	
12	Cornard United	38	15	7	16	53	60	−7	52	
13	Long Melford	38	14	8	16	62	66	−4	50	
14	Needham Market	38	14	5	19	67	73	−6	47	
15	Felixstowe & Walton United	38	12	9	17	52	63	−11	45	
16	March Town United	38	12	5	21	70	99	−29	41	
17	Downham Town	38	9	7	22	43	79	−36	34	
18	Hadleigh United	38	6	13	19	42	57	−15	31	
19	Thetford Town	38	6	6	26	38	85	−47	24	
20	Somersham Town	38	4	5	29	34	102	−68	17	Resigned to the Cambridgeshire League
21	Warboys Town	0	0	0	0	0	0	0	0	Resigned from the league, record expunged

Source: fchd
Rules for classification: 1) points; 2) goal difference; 3) number of goals scored.
