= 2004–05 Eastern Counties Football League =

The 2004–05 season was the 63rd in the history of Eastern Counties Football League a football competition in England.

AFC Sudbury were champions, winning their fifth Eastern Counties Football League title in a row after the new club was formed in 1999.

== Premier Division ==
Eastern Counties Football League Premier Division
- Season: 2004–05
- Champions: AFC Sudbury
- Relegated: Gorleston; Great Yarmouth Town; Stowmarket Town
- Matches: 462
- Goals: 1,661 (3.6 per match)

The Premier Division featured 19 clubs which competed in the division last season, along with three new clubs, promoted from Division One:

- Cambridge City reserves
- Harwich & Parkeston
- Leiston

=== League table ===
Pos	Team	Pld	W	D	L	GF	GA	GD	Pts	Promotion or relegation
1	AFC Sudbury	42	31	7	4	105	30	+75	100	
2	Bury Town	42	27	9	6	83	43	+40	90	
3	Halstead Town	42	24	10	8	83	53	+30	82	
4	Lowestoft Town	42	24	8	10	94	57	+37	80	
5	Wroxham	42	22	9	11	106	59	+47	75	
6	Mildenhall Town	42	20	11	11	68	54	+14	71	
7	Soham Town Rangers	42	20	10	12	88	58	+30	70	
8	Clacton Town	42	19	13	10	79	61	+18	68 (Note: Clacton Town were deducted two points.)	
9	Cambridge City reserves	42	19	8	15	78	75	+3	65	
10	Leiston	42	16	9	17	66	74	−8	59 (Note: Leiston were awarded two points.)	
11	Harwich & Parkeston	42	17	4	21	72	85	−13	55	
12	Diss Town	42	15	8	19	77	71	+6	53	
13	Newmarket Town	42	14	9	19	67	76	−9	51	
14	Norwich United	42	12	11	19	50	63	−13	47	
15	Dereham Town	42	12	10	20	69	89	−20	46	
16	Wisbech Town	42	12	10	20	59	84	−25	46	
17	Woodbridge Town	42	12	8	22	62	85	−23	44	
18	King's Lynn reserves	42	13	5	24	58	92	−34	44	
19	Histon reserves	42	13	7	22	61	82	−21	43 (Note: Histon reserves were deducted three points.)	
20	Stowmarket Town	42	11	5	26	66	88	−22	38	Relegated to Division One
21	Gorleston	42	8	10	24	57	113	−56	34	Relegated to Division One
22	Great Yarmouth Town	42	7	7	28	31	87	−56	28	Relegated to Division One

Source: fchd
Rules for classification: 1) points; 2) goal difference; 3) number of goals scored.

== Division One ==
Eastern Counties Football League Division One
- Season: 2004–05
- Champions: Ipswich Wanderers
- Promoted: Ipswich Wanderers; Kirkley; Needham Market
- Matches: 380
- Goals: 1,326 (3.49 per match)

Division One featured 16 clubs which competed in the division last season, along with four new clubs:

- Fakenham Town, relegated from the Premier Division
- Saffron Walden Town, returned to league system after leaving Essex Senior League in 2003
- Tiptree United, relegated from the Premier Division
- Walsham-le-Willows, joined from the Suffolk and Ipswich League

=== League table ===
Pos	Team	Pld	W	D	L	GF	GA	GD	Pts	Promotion
1	Ipswich Wanderers	38	27	8	3	103	29	+74	89	Promoted to the Premier Division
2	Needham Market	38	26	7	5	103	50	+53	85	Promoted to the Premier Division
3	Kirkley	38	25	6	7	99	34	+65	81	Promoted to the Premier Division
4	Walsham-le-Willows	38	24	4	10	97	49	+48	76	
5	Haverhill Rovers	38	22	10	6	77	41	+36	76	
6	Stanway Rovers	38	23	4	11	89	57	+32	73	
7	March Town United	38	21	8	9	74	54	+20	71	
8	Tiptree United	38	19	6	13	75	70	+5	63	
9	Ely City	38	17	2	19	72	66	+6	53	
10	Fakenham Town	38	15	6	17	62	78	−16	51	
11	Cornard United	38	15	5	18	43	62	−19	50	
12	Swaffham Town	38	14	4	20	51	86	−35	46	
13	Long Melford	38	13	6	19	62	68	−6	45	
14	Whitton United	38	10	10	18	51	67	−16	40	
15	Saffron Walden Town	38	10	6	22	55	83	−28	36	
16	Hadleigh United	38	9	7	22	46	83	−37	34	
17	Felixstowe & Walton United	38	9	6	23	46	74	−28	33	
18	Downham Town	38	10	3	25	45	94	−49	33	
19	Thetford Town	38	6	6	26	41	98	−57	24	
20	Godmanchester Rovers	38	5	6	27	35	83	−48	21	

Source: fchd
Rules for classification: 1) points; 2) goal difference; 3) number of goals scored.
