= 2000–01 Eastern Counties Football League =

The 2000–01 season was the 59th in the history of Eastern Counties Football League a football competition in England.

AFC Sudbury were champions, winning their first Eastern Counties Football League title after the new club was formed in 1999.

== Premier Division ==
Eastern Counties Football League Premier Division
- Season: 2000–01
- Champions: AFC Sudbury
- Relegated: Halstead Town; Warboys Town
- Matches: 462
- Goals: 1,471 (3.18 per match)

The Premier Division featured 20 clubs which competed in the division last season, along with two new clubs, promoted from Division One:

- Ely City
- Tiptree United

Also, Felixstowe Port & Town merged with Walton United to form new club Felixstowe & Walton United.

=== League table ===
Pos	Team	Pld	W	D	L	GF	GA	GD	Pts	Promotion or relegation
1	AFC Sudbury	42	32	7	3	134	37	+97	103	
2	Gorleston	42	29	8	5	99	41	+58	95	
3	Lowestoft Town	42	26	10	6	99	41	+58	88	
4	Maldon Town	42	20	10	12	68	52	+16	70	
5	Clacton Town	42	19	11	12	79	58	+21	68	
6	Wroxham	42	18	9	15	88	66	+22	63	
7	Woodbridge Town	42	17	12	13	62	67	−5	63	
8	Great Yarmouth Town	42	18	8	16	64	59	+5	62	
9	Soham Town Rangers	42	18	6	18	68	70	−2	60	
10	Stowmarket Town	42	16	12	14	55	58	−3	60	
11	Diss Town	42	16	10	16	69	66	+3	58	
12	Ipswich Wanderers	42	16	8	18	54	52	+2	56	
13	Fakenham Town	42	17	5	20	60	68	−8	56	
14	Tiptree United	42	15	10	17	70	64	+6	55	
15	Mildenhall Town	42	15	9	18	59	58	+1	54	
16	Bury Town	42	15	9	18	56	73	−17	54	
17	Ely City	42	12	10	20	61	74	−13	46	
18	Felixstowe & Walton United	42	12	9	21	45	75	−30	45	
19	Harwich & Parkeston	42	11	6	25	51	98	−47	39	
20	Newmarket Town	42	9	9	24	50	83	−33	36	
21	Warboys Town	42	7	9	26	38	105	−67	30	Relegated to Division One
22	Halstead Town	42	7	7	28	42	106	−64	28	Relegated to Division One

Source: fchd
Rules for classification: 1) points; 2) goal difference; 3) number of goals scored.

== Division One ==
Eastern Counties Football League Division One
- Season: 2000–01
- Champions: Swaffham Town
- Promoted: Dereham Town; Swaffham Town
- Matches: 272
- Goals: 948 (3.49 per match)

Division One featured 16 clubs which competed in the division last season, along with one new club:

- Wisbech Town reserves

=== League table ===
Pos	Team	Pld	W	D	L	GF	GA	GD	Pts	Promotion
1	Swaffham Town	32	24	5	3	83	27	+56	77	Promoted to the Premier Division
2	Dereham Town	32	22	5	5	83	23	+60	71	Promoted to the Premier Division
3	Stanway Rovers	32	22	5	5	86	29	+57	71	
4	Needham Market	32	20	5	7	70	33	+37	65	
5	Chatteris Town	32	17	6	9	73	46	+27	57	Resigned to the Peterborough and District League
6	Hadleigh United	32	16	5	11	51	46	+5	53	
7	Haverhill Rovers	32	15	7	10	67	39	+28	52	
8	Cambridge City reserves	32	14	9	9	62	47	+15	51	
9	Downham Town	32	14	7	11	71	60	+11	49	
10	Norwich United	32	12	5	15	53	46	+7	41	
11	Cornard United	32	10	3	19	37	85	−48	33	
12	Whitton United	32	8	6	18	41	64	−23	30	
13	Somersham Town	32	7	8	17	42	69	−27	29	
14	Wisbech Town reserves	32	8	4	20	42	72	−30	28	
15	Thetford Town	32	7	4	21	37	81	−44	25	
16	Brightlingsea United	32	4	7	21	32	88	−56	19	
17	March Town United	32	3	7	22	18	93	−75	15 (Note: March Town United were deducted one point.)	

Source: fchd
Rules for classification: 1) points; 2) goal difference; 3) number of goals scored.
