= A.F.C. Sudbury =

English football club

Coordinates: 52°2′25″N 0°42′58″E

- Full name: Amalgamated Football Club Sudbury
- Nicknames: Yellows; The Suds
- Founded: 1999
- Ground: The Elite Travel Stadium, Sudbury
- Capacity: 2,000
- Chairman: Andrew Harvison
- Manager: Phil Weavers
- League: Isthmian League North Division
- 2025–26: Southern League Premier Division Central, 22nd of 22 (relegated)
- Website: afcsudbury.co.uk
Home colours	Away colours

Amalgamated Football Club Sudbury is a football club based in Sudbury, Suffolk, England. The club was formed in 1999 by the merger of Sudbury Town and Sudbury Wanderers, the process giving rise to the name Amalgamated Football Club Sudbury. and went on to win the Eastern Counties League Premier Division five seasons in a row as well as reaching the final of the FA Vase in three successive seasons, records for both competitions. They are currently members of the Isthmian League North Division and play at The Elite Travel Stadium in the Ballingdon-Brundon area of Sudbury.

== History ==
AFC Sudbury was formed on 1 June 1999 by the amalgamation of the town's two previous clubs, Sudbury Town (founded 1885) and Sudbury Wanderers (founded 1958). The new club played at Wanderers' ground, and were initially managed by Wanderers' Keith Martin.

In their debut season, 1999–2000, Sudbury finished in third place in the Eastern Counties League Premier Division. The following five seasons all resulted in Sudbury winning the Premier Division title – a league record. Sudbury did not take promotion at any of these opportunities, despite being entitled to. In this period Sudbury had a series of good performances in national cup competitions. In 2000–01 the club reached the first round of the FA Cup, where they were beaten 6–1 by Darlington. They reached the semi-final of the 2001–02 FA Vase, before being knocked out by Tiptree United. The following three seasons saw Sudbury reaching the final each year (a Vase record), but being defeated every time, by Brigg Town in 2003 (after which Martin left the club and was replaced by Gary Harvey), Winchester City in 2004 and Didcot Town in 2005. However, the club did win the Suffolk Premier Cup three times, in 2001–02, 2002–03 and 2003–04.

The financial constraints of owning two grounds led the board not to apply for promotion until the beginning of the 2005–06 season. After finishing third in 2005–06, a season in which they won the Eastern Counties League Cup, and passing the necessary ground inspection Sudbury were invited to take promotion into a resurrected Isthmian League Division One North, following the re-structuring of the National League System. Potential legal action from the Northern Premier League nearly scuppered this move, but Sudbury started 2006–07 in the new division. The management team of Gary Harvey and Michael Cheetham, who took the team up, both resigned before the season could begin, citing work and family commitments, respectively. New manager Mark Morsley was appointed in May 2006, signed from Needham Market. Sudbury's first season at this level saw the club finish in fifth place, qualifying them for the promotion play-offs. After beating Enfield Town in the semi-final, Sudbury lost to Harlow Town in a penalty shootout. Sudbury again qualified for the play-offs in 2007–08, finishing second in the table, but were defeated in the semi-final by eventual winners Canvey Island. In the close-season manager Morsley resigned, and was replaced by his assistant Nicky Smith.

Sudbury were moved into the Southern League Division One Midlands for 2008–09 following a restructuring of the English football pyramid. After two seasons of mid-table finishes the club was moved back to the Isthmian League Division One North for 2010–11. Smith resigned in September 2011 and was replaced by his assistant Chris Tracey. At the start of the 2013–14 season, Sudbury appointed Wroxham manager David Batch as their new manager, after Chris Tracey left the club. Sudbury reached the final of the Isthmian League Cup in April 2014, but lost 3–0 away to Maidstone United. Batch left to join St Neots Town at the end of 2014, and was replaced by Jamie Godbold. Godbold led the club to a third-place finish and qualification for the play-offs, where they were defeated by Brentwood Town in the semi-final. The following season Sudbury won the division with three games to spare, earning promotion to the Premier Division. Their stay in the division only lasted one season as they were relegated back to Division One North at the end of the campaign, the club's first-ever relegation. Mark Morsley re-joined as first team manager in early 2017–18.

In 2021 Sudbury reached the first round of the FA Cup for a second time, causing an upset by beating Dartford 3–1 in the fourth qualifying round, who were two tiers above Sudbury, top of the league and unbeaten. In the first round, they were drawn at home against nearby League Two side Colchester United, losing 4–0 in front of a record but reduced capacity attendance of 2,000. The match was broadcast live on BBC Two and shown in 78 countries. The 2022–23 season saw them finish second in the North Division, going on to defeat Grays Athletic in the play-off semi-finals, before beating Heybridge Swifts after extra time in the final to earn promotion to the Premier Division Central of the Southern League. After finishing bottom of the Premier Division Central in 2025–26 they were relegated back to the North Division of the Isthmian League.

=== Season-by-season record ===
Season	Division	Position	Significant events
1999–2000	Eastern Counties League Premier Division	3/21	–
2000–01	Eastern Counties League Premier Division	1/22	Champions, declined promotion. Reached first round of FA Cup
2001–02	Eastern Counties League Premier Division	1/22	Champions, declined promotion. Reached semi-final of FA Vase. Suffolk Premier Cup winners
2002–03	Eastern Counties League Premier Division	1/23	Champions, declined promotion. FA Vase runner-up. Suffolk Premier Cup winners
2003–04	Eastern Counties League Premier Division	1/22	Champions, declined promotion. FA Vase runner-up. Suffolk Premier Cup winners
2004–05	Eastern Counties League Premier Division	1/22	Champions, declined promotion. FA Vase runner-up
2005–06	Eastern Counties League Premier Division	3/22	Promoted. Eastern Counties League cup winners.
2006–07	Isthmian League Division One North	5/22	Lost in play-off final
2007–08	Isthmian League Division One North	2/22	Lost in play-off semi-final; transferred to Southern League
2008–09	Southern League Division One Midlands	12/22	
2009–10	Southern League Division One Midlands	14/22	Transferred to Isthmian League
2010–11	Isthmian League Division One North	7/21	
2011–12	Isthmian League Division One North	8/22	
2012–13	Isthmian League Division One North	17/22	
2013–14	Isthmian League Division One North	10/24	
2014–15	Isthmian League Division One North	3/24	Lost in play-off semi-final
2015–16	Isthmian League Division One North	1/24	Champions, promoted
2016–17	Isthmian League Premier Division	23/24	Relegated
2017–18	Isthmian League North Division	12/24	
2018–19	Isthmian League North Division	8/20	
2019–20	Isthmian League North Division	–	Season abandoned due to coronavirus pandemic
2020–21	Isthmian League North Division	–	Season abandoned due to coronavirus pandemic
2021–22	Isthmian League North Division	7/20	Reached first round of FA Cup
2022–23	Isthmian League North Division	2/20	Play-off winners, promoted
2023–24	Southern League Premier Central	18/21	
2024–25	Southern League Premier Central	17/22	
2025–26	Southern League Premier Central	22/22	Relegated

== Other teams ==
=== Reserve team ===
The AFC Sudbury reserve team initially played in the Reserves section of the Eastern Counties League before joining Division One of the league at the start of the 2013–14 season, at which point it was renamed AFC Sudbury Reserves/Under-21s. In the team's second season in Division One they won the First Division Knock-Out Cup, after beating Great Yarmouth Town 1–0. Currently AFC Sudbury Reserves find themselves in the Thurlow Nunn league, the 10th tier of English football.

=== Women's First Team ===
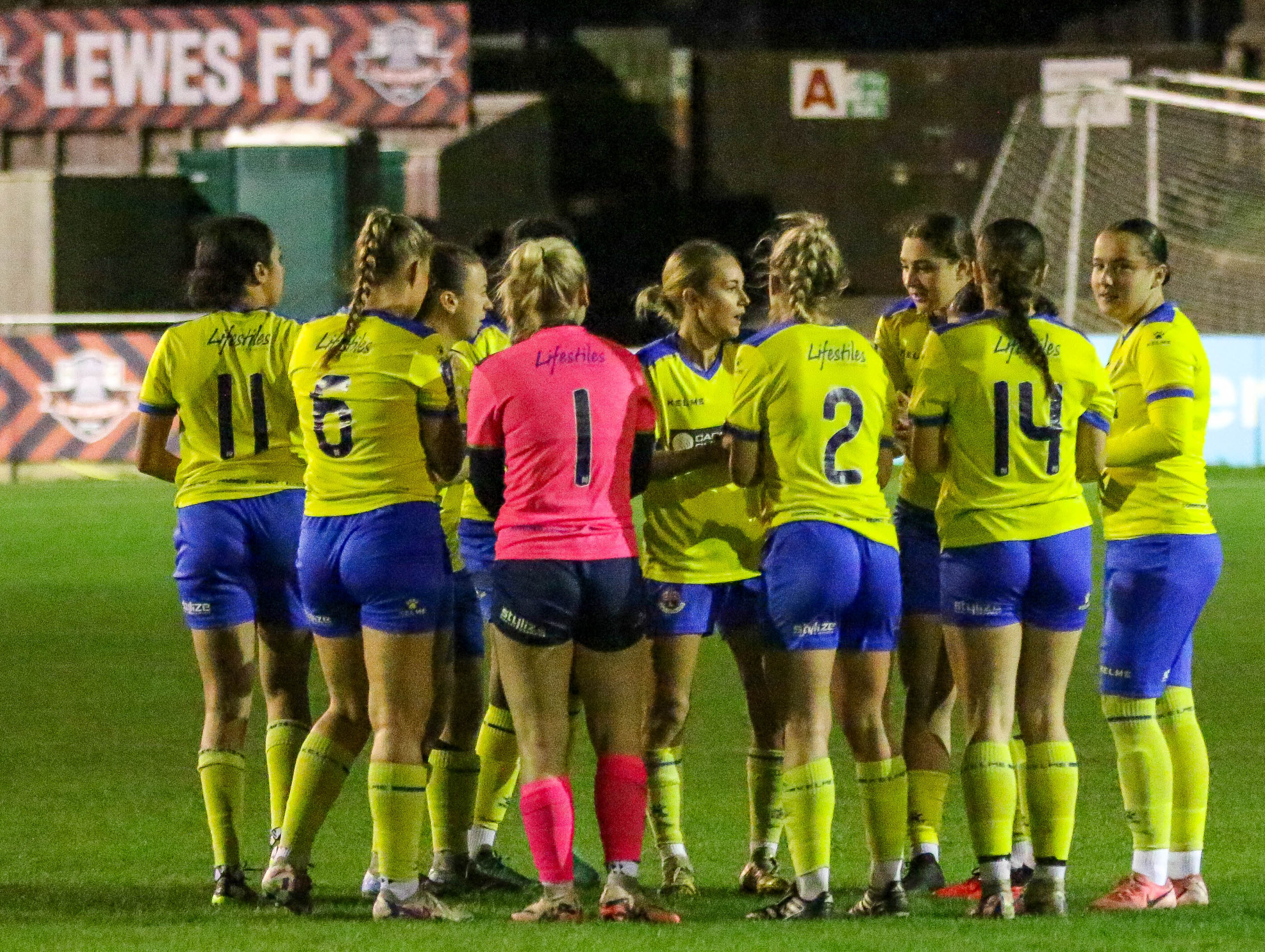
AFC Sudbury Women in 2024

The AFC Sudbury women's team took over Sudbury Wanderers' place in Division Two of the Eastern Region Women's Football League in 1999. However, they dropped out the league at the end of the 2001–02 season. They returned to the league in 2010 and were placed in Division One North. After being promoted from Division One North to the Premier Division at the end of the 2014–15 season, the club achieved consecutive promotions in 2021–22 and 2022–23 to reach the FA Women's National League Division One South East, the fourth tier of women's football. The Women's First Team have won the Suffolk FA County Cup three times, the last two being in 2023–24 and 2024–25.

=== Youth teams ===
The club's academy team plays in the Eastern Counties Youth League, whilst it has an under-19 teams in the Football Conference Youth Alliance. The club has two youth sections, one playing from U7s through to U16s in the Suffolk Youth League and the other being a pathway to the academy for ages U9 to U16 for boys playing in the Colchester & District Youth League first then Eastern Junior Alliance for U13s upwards, and U11s to U16s girls teams playing in the Junior Premier League.

== Colours and badge ==
AFC Sudbury's club colours are yellow and blue, the same as those of Sudbury Town. The club's second choice kit, usually when away from home, is all red for the men's first team, all pink for the women's first team and blue for the youth teams, although in past seasons other colours have been used, such as all white in the 2007–08 season and fuchsia in the 2024–25 season.

The club badge is the town crest of Sudbury, which incorporates a talbot dog with its tongue sticking out. This was augmented with a banner containing the club's name in early 2018.

== Ground ==
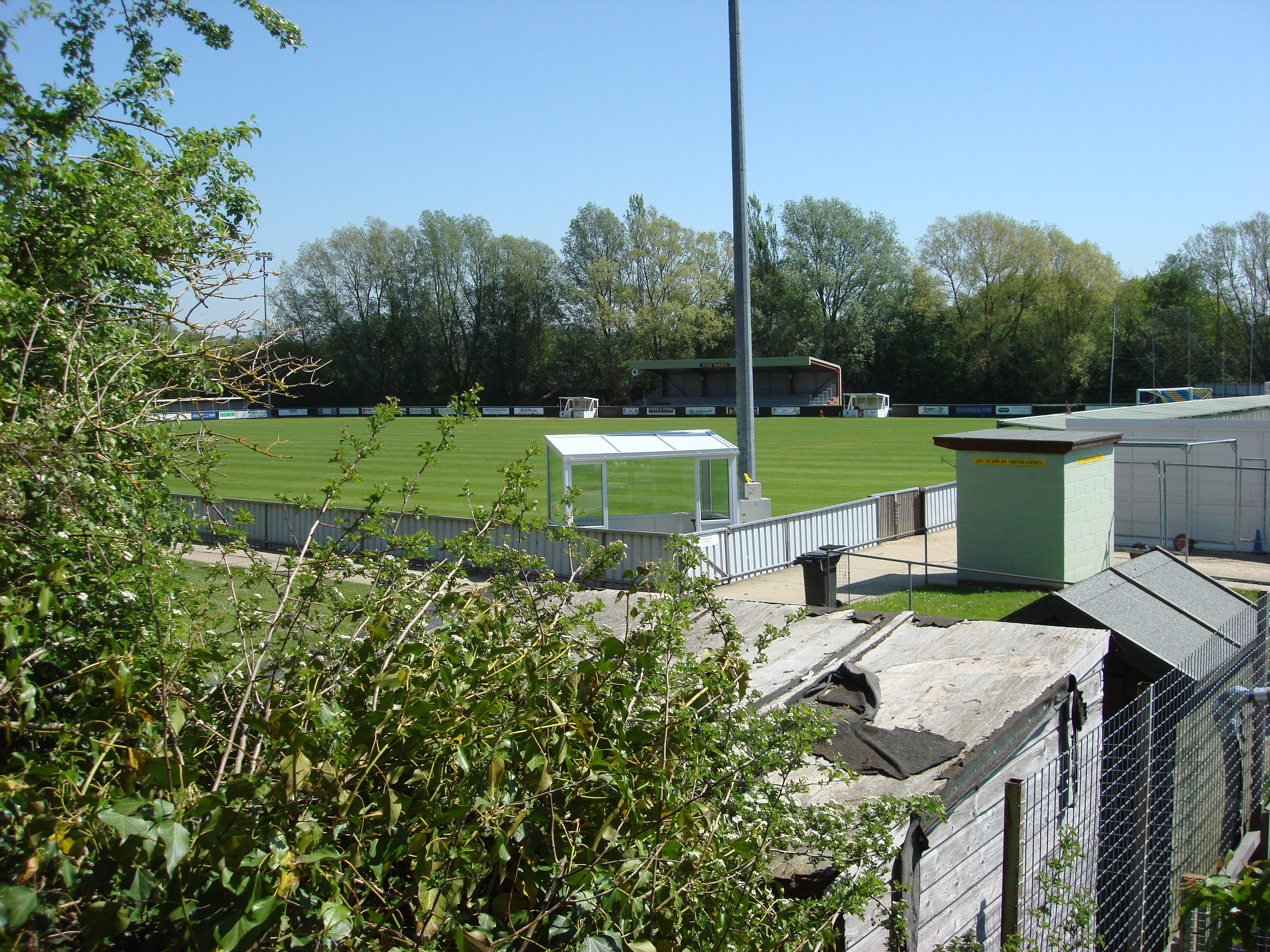
Kings Marsh Stadium

AFC Sudbury play their home games at the 2,500 capacity King's Marsh Stadium in the Ballingdon-Brundon area of Sudbury, previously home to Sudbury Wanderers. At the time of AFC Sudbury's formation the ground consisted of two pitches, a training area, clubhouse, floodlights, a 200-seat stand on the West side of the main pitch and covered ends behind the goals. A 300-capacity terrace (the Shed) was constructed on the East side of the pitch in 2000 and houses the more vocal section of the crowd. A new clubhouse, also containing a grassroots football and education centre, was completed in 2010. The ground is fully enclosed by fencing and there are turnstiles at the main entrance. In 2025 a second 3G pitch was installed at the site.

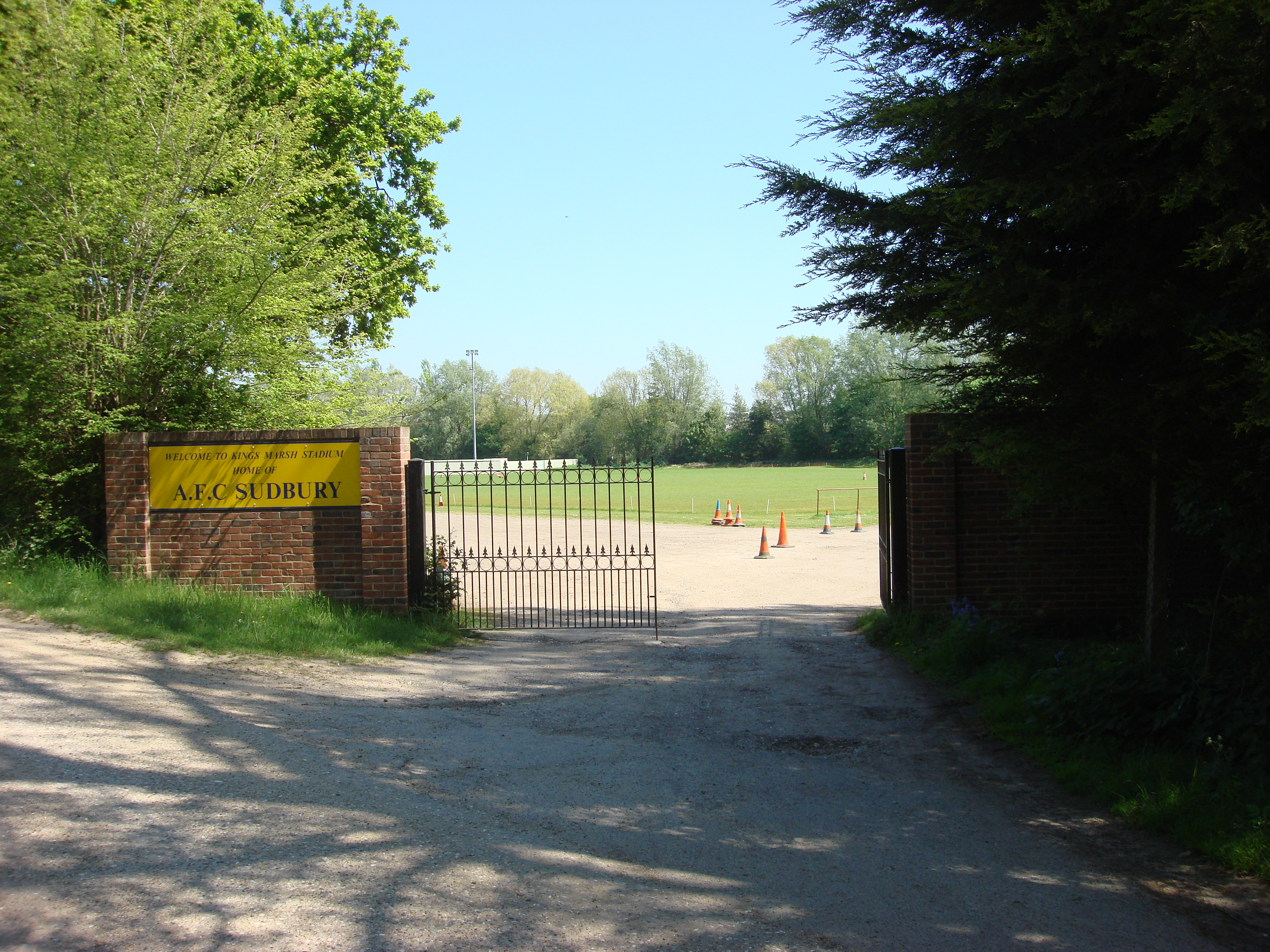
Entrance to A.F.C. Sudbury's grounds

AFC Sudbury sold Sudbury Town's former ground, the Priory Stadium, to a housing developer in June 2007. The money from this sale was earmarked for paying off loans, and capital gains tax, as well as a new clubhouse and changing rooms. Planning permission for the construction of the new facilities was granted by Babergh District Council in August 2008, though various conditions regarding issues such as possible land contamination, the site's archaeological value, risk of flooding and drainage are required to be addressed before work may commence.

A 3G artificial turf pitch was installed prior to the 2015–16 season.

== Honours ==
- Isthmian League
  - Division One North champions 2015–16
- Eastern Counties League
  - Premier Division Champions 2000–01, 2001–02, 2002–03, 2003–04, 2004–05
  - League Cup winners 2005–06
- Suffolk Premier Cup
  - Winners 2001–02, 2002–03, 2003–04

== Records ==
- Best FA Cup performance: First round, 2000–01, 2021–22
- Best FA Trophy performance: Second round, 2025–26
- Best FA Vase performance: Runners-up, 2003–04, 2004–05, 2005–06
- Most appearances: Sam Clarke, 387
- Most goals: Gary Bennett, 172
- Record attendance: 2,000 vs Colchester United, FA Cup first round, 5 November 2021

== See also ==
- A.F.C. Sudbury players
- A.F.C. Sudbury managers
- A.F.C. Sudbury coaches
