= Ballingdon =

Suburb of Sudbury, Suffolk, England

Coordinates: 52.033°N 00.716°E

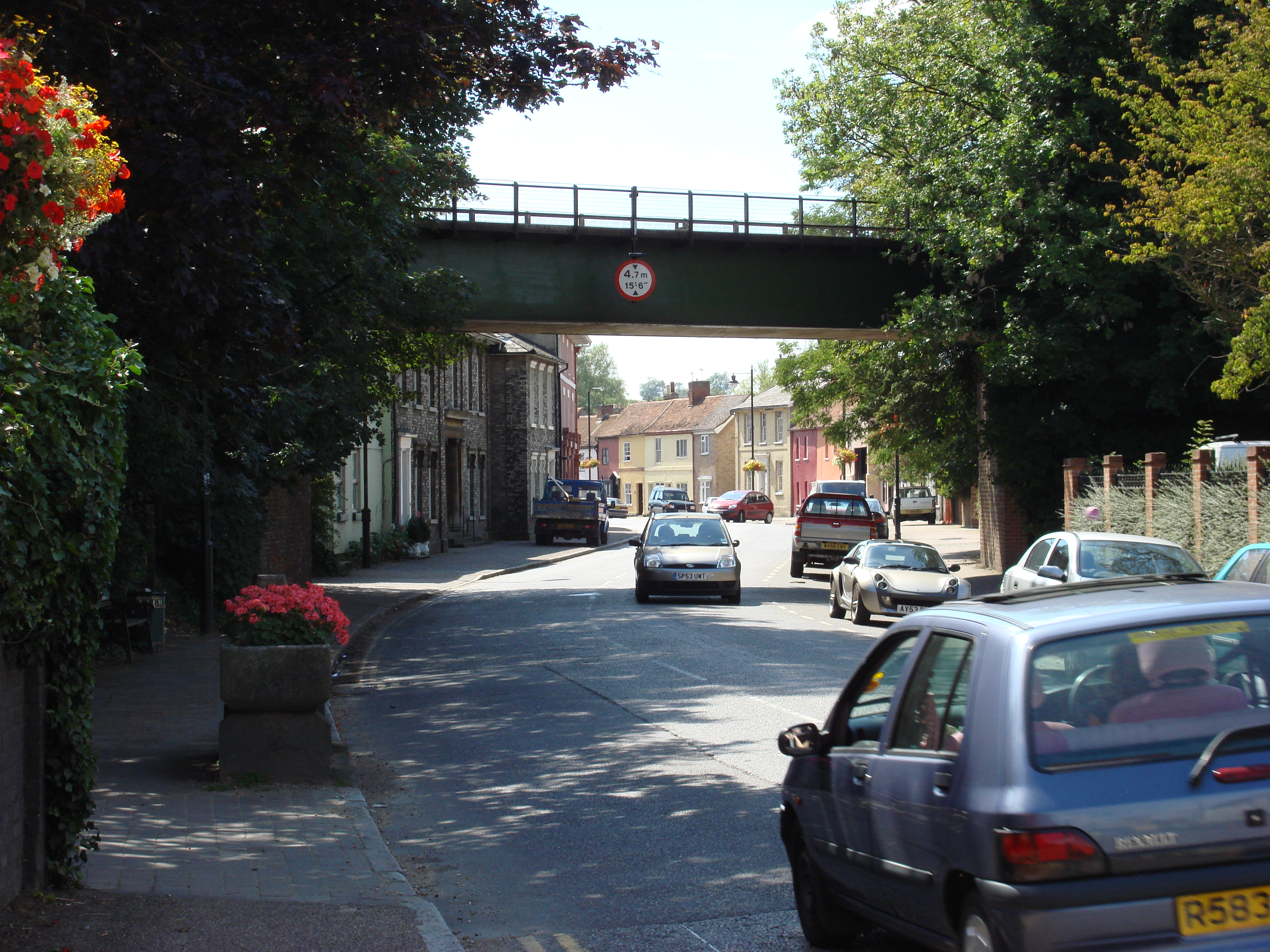
- Ballingdon Street, Ballingdon

- Location within Suffolk
- Interactive map of Ballingdon
- OS grid reference: TL8640
- Civil parish: Sudbury
- District: Babergh
- Shire county: Suffolk
- Region: East
- Country: England
- Sovereign state: United Kingdom
- Post town: Sudbury
- Postcode district: CO10
- Dialling code: 01787
- Police: Suffolk
- Fire: Suffolk
- Ambulance: East of England

Ballingdon is a suburb of the town of Sudbury and former civil parish, now in the parish of Sudbury, in the Babergh district, in Suffolk, England. Once a separate village in the county of Essex. It is the only part of the town to the south of the River Stour. In 1951 the parish had a population of 458.

The village developed on the important ancient highway from Braintree and Halstead in Essex to Sudbury and Bury St Edmunds. It grew adjacent to a bridge (today known as Ballingdon Bridge) over the River Stour. It dates back to at least the 13th century, and remains the only crossing of the river for several miles in either direction. Ballingdon and Brundon (which formed the township of Ballingdon-cum-Brundon, then in Essex) were added to the borough of Sudbury (and the county of Suffolk) in 1888 as part of the Local Government Act. Around that time it had a population of 831.

In 1972 the owners of Ballingdon Hall, responding to a housing development on adjacent land, had it moved half a mile up Ballingdon Hill on the back of a large transporter; the event was watched by 10,000 people.

Ballingdon came to be home to many businesses, evidence of which can be seen in the architecture of the buildings, with large shop windows and other tell-tale signs. This was because before Ballingdon became part of Suffolk it was cheaper to open a business on the Essex side of the river, as no levy had to be paid to Sudbury town council. By 2011 only eight businesses remained open outside the industrial units, just three of them retail outlets.

Ballingdon was home to two brickworks, long since vanished, but maps of their locations can be found online. The Allen family operation (on Middleton Road) was the most advanced, and barges made their way up a specially constructed cut from the River Stour, which passed the brickworks and even continued under Middleton Road. The clay was sourced locally, and brick makers were expected to meet a target of 1,000 bricks per day. The hand-making of bricks has long since been superseded by machines, but can still be seen at Bulmer Brick and Tile, who offer tours to schools and adults.

Today Ballingdon Street is a conservation area and contains numerous listed buildings. King's Marsh Stadium, home of A.F.C. Sudbury, is located in the area.

In September 2018, Ballingdon held its first fete in living memory, raising money for the Eden Rose Coppice. The fete, held on Kone Vale, has also taken place in 2019 and 2022, raising a total of £9,000 in its first three events for local good causes.
