= Fraser Alexander =

English footballer (born 2003)

Personal information
- Full name: Fraser Scott Alexander
- Date of birth: 20 February 2003 (age 23)
- Place of birth: Cambridge, England
- Height: 5 ft 8 in (1.73 m)
- Position: Midfielder

Team information
- Current team: Leiston

Youth career
- 2011–2021: Ipswich Town

Senior career*
Years	Team	Apps	(Gls)
2021–2023	Ipswich Town	0	(0)
2022–2023	→ Cheshunt (loan)	32	(2)
2023–2024	Bishop's Stortford	26	(0)
2024-	Leiston	0	(0)
- * Club domestic league appearances and goals as of 01:37, 13 August 2024 (UTC)

Fraser Scott Alexander (born 20 February 2003) is an English semi-professional footballer who plays as a midfielder for Leiston.

== Career ==
Alexander joined the Academy at Ipswich Town at the age of eight and went on to captain the under-18 side. He was named in "The 11" by the League Football Education in November 2020 after completing the BTEC Extended Diploma to a D*D*D* standard and making excellent progress in his mathematics A-Level. He signed his first professional contract after being named as U18 Second Year Player of the Year in 2021. He made his first-team debut on 30 August 2022, coming on as an 81st-minute substitute for Cameron Humphreys in 6–0 win over Northampton Town in an EFL Trophy match at Portman Road. On 21 October 2022, he joined Cheshunt of the National League South on a one-month loan.

He joined Southern League Premier Division Central team Leiston in August 2024 on expiry of his contract at Ipswich.

== Style of play ==
Alexander describes himself as a "solid central midfielder".

== Career statistics ==
As of match played 26 December 2022

Appearances and goals by club, season and competition
Club	Season	League			FA Cup		EFL Cup		Other		Total	
Club	Season	Division	Apps	Goals	Apps	Goals	Apps	Goals	Apps	Goals	Apps	Goals
Ipswich Town	2022–23	EFL League One	0	0	0	0	0	0	1 (Note: Includes appearance(s) in the EFL Trophy)	0	1	0
Cheshunt (loan)	2022–23	National League South	32	2	0	0	0	0	3 (Note: Includes appearance(s) in the FA Trophy) (Note: Includes Appearance(s) in the Herts Senior Cup)	0	35	2
Career total			32	0	0	0	0	0	4	0	36	2
