= Suffolk Premier Cup =

- Founded: 1958
- Region: Suffolk
- Number of teams: Varies
- Current champions: Felixstowe & Walton United (1st title)
- Most successful club(s): Bury Town, Lowestoft Town, Sudbury Town (13 titles)
- Website: Suffolk Premier Cup

The Suffolk Premier Cup is the top level football cup competition organised by the Suffolk FA. It is currently open to clubs competing at the Eastern Counties League Premier Division level and above. Suffolk's only professional football club, Ipswich Town, enters a reserve team.

== Past finals ==
Season	Winner	Score	Runner–up	Attendance
1958–59	Bury Town	2–1	Long Melford	3,712
1959–60	Bury Town	0–0	Sudbury Town	
Replay	Bury Town	3–1	Sudbury Town	
1960–61	Bury Town	5–3	Long Melford	
1961–62	Bury Town	1–1	Lowestoft Town	
Replay	Bury Town	4–2	Lowestoft Town	
1962–63	Stowmarket Town	2–0	Lowestoft Town	
1963–64	Bury Town	2–2	Lowestoft Town	
Replay	Bury Town	3–0	Lowestoft Town	
1964–65	Bury Town	4–1	Lowestoft Town	
1965–66	Bury Town	2–1	Haverhill Rovers	
1966–67	Lowestoft Town	3–0	Stowmarket Town	
1967–68	Ipswich Town	4–1	Bury Town	
1968–69	Ipswich Town	5–0	Lowestoft Town	
1969–70	Ipswich Town	6–1	Sudbury Town	
1970–71	Bury Town	0–0	Sudbury Town	
Replay	Bury Town	1–0	Sudbury Town	
1971–72	Lowestoft Town	3–1	Bury Town	
1972–73	Sudbury Town	4–0	Bury Town	
1973–74	Sudbury Town	5–4 (0–3, 5–1)	Lowestoft Town	
1974–75	Lowestoft Town	3–2 (0–1, 3–1)	Newmarket Town	
1975–76	Sudbury Town	3–1 (1–0, 2–1)	Lowestoft Town	
1976–77	Sudbury Town	3–3 (3–1, 0–2)	Stowmarket Town	
Replay	Stowmarket Town	2–1	Sudbury Town	
1977–78	Bury Town	5–1 (4–0, 1–1)	Lowestoft Town	
1978–79	Lowestoft Town	5–2 (3–2, 2–0)	Sudbury Town	
1979–80	Lowestoft Town	2–0 (2–0, 0–0)	Sudbury Town	
1980–81	Sudbury Town	6–3 (4–2, 2–1)	Felixstowe Town	
1981–82	Sudbury Town	2–1	Bury Town	
1982–83	Sudbury Town	3–1 (aet)	Lowestoft Town	
1983–84	Brantham Athletic	2–0	Lowestoft Town	
1984–85	Sudbury Town	3–1	Lowestoft Town	
1985–86	Stowmarket Town	1–0	Lowestoft Town	
1986–87	Sudbury Town	2–1	Felixstowe Town	
1987–88	Sudbury Town	3–1	Newmarket Town	
1988–89	Sudbury Town	3–1	Bury Town	
1989–90	Sudbury Town	4–2	Bury Town	
1990–91	Stowmarket Town	3–2	Haverhill Rovers	
1991–92	Sudbury Town	1–0	Stowmarket Town	
1992–93	Sudbury Town	2–1	Brantham Athletic	
1993–94	Newmarket Town	2–1	Sudbury Town	
1994–95	Newmarket Town	1–1	Felixstowe Town	
Replay	Newmarket Town	1–0	Felixstowe Town	
1995–96	Bury Town	0–0	Woodbridge Town	
1995–96	Bury won 5–4 on penalties			
1996–97	Newmarket Town	0–0	Stowmarket Town	
Replay	Newmarket Town	1–0	Stowmarket Town	
1997–98	Sudbury Wanderers	0–0	Lowestoft Town	
Replay	Sudbury Wanderers	5–2	Lowestoft Town	
1998–99	Newmarket Town	1–0 (aet)	Sudbury Town	
1999–00	Lowestoft Town	1–0	Mildenhall Town	
2000–01	Lowestoft Town	4–3	AFC Sudbury	
2001–02	AFC Sudbury	3–1	Felixstowe & Walton United	
2002–03	AFC Sudbury	1–0	Mildenhall Town	
2003–04	AFC Sudbury	4–0	Bury Town	
2004–05	Lowestoft Town	4–3	Bury Town	
2005–06	Lowestoft Town	3–2	Leiston	
2006–07	Ipswich Town reserves	8–0	Leiston	
2007–08	Needham Market	0–0	Leiston	803
2007–08	Needham won 5–4 on penalties			803
2008–09	Lowestoft Town	3–2	Needham Market	921
2009–10	Ipswich Town reserves	4–1	Needham Market	825
2010–11	Bury Town	2–0	Needham Market	1,488
2011–12	Lowestoft Town	4–2	Bury Town	
2012–13	Bury Town	2–0	Lowestoft Town	
2013–14	Bury Town	4–1	Felixstowe & Walton United	457
2014–15	Lowestoft Town	2–1 (aet)	Whitton United	425
2015–16	Lowestoft Town	3–1	Leiston	681
2016–17	Needham Market	3–2	Lowestoft Town	
2017–18	Leiston	3–0	Bury Town	
2018–19	Leiston	3–2	Felixstowe & Walton United	
2019–20	Needham Market	4–3 (3–1, 1–2)	Lowestoft Town	
2020–21	No final took place due to the coronavirus pandemic			
2021–22	Needham Market	0–0	Leiston	
2021–22	Needham won 5–4 on penalties			
2022–23	Needham Market	3–3	Stowmarket Town	977
2022–23	Needham won 6–5 on penalties			977
2023–24	Needham Market	2–0	Felixstowe & Walton United	604
2024–25	Felixstowe & Walton United	2–2	Leiston	813
2024–25	Felixstowe won 4–3 on penalties			813
