= GER Sports Ground =

Sports stadium in Cambridgeshire, UK

- Location: Robingoodfellows Lane, March, Cambridgeshire
- Coordinates: 52°33′15″N 0°05′09″E
- Opened: 1920s

The GER (Great Eastern Railway) Sports Stadium is a football and former greyhound racing, cricket and cycling stadium in Robingoodfellows Lane, March, Cambridgeshire.

== Origins ==
The stadium was constructed on the west side of Robingoodfellows Lane in north March around 1923 when the March GER United football team moved in.

== Football ==
The GER Sports Ground is the Home of March Town United F.C.

== Greyhound Racing ==
The ground started greyhound racing from 31 January 1931. The first winner was a greyhound called Theaker over a race distance of 600 yards (two laps of the 300 yard course) and then he contested a final later that day.

In the 1960s alterations were made to the ground to accommodate changes in the greyhound track which upset the football followers because the wooden stand was moved further from the pitch.

Racing took place on Wednesday and Saturday evenings on a circumference of 450 yards. Race distances were 325, 550 and 760 yards, and it had an all grass circuit with an inside hare system. The racing finished in 1984.
