= Brundon =

Hamlet in Suffolk, England

Coordinates: 52.0463°N 0.7182°E

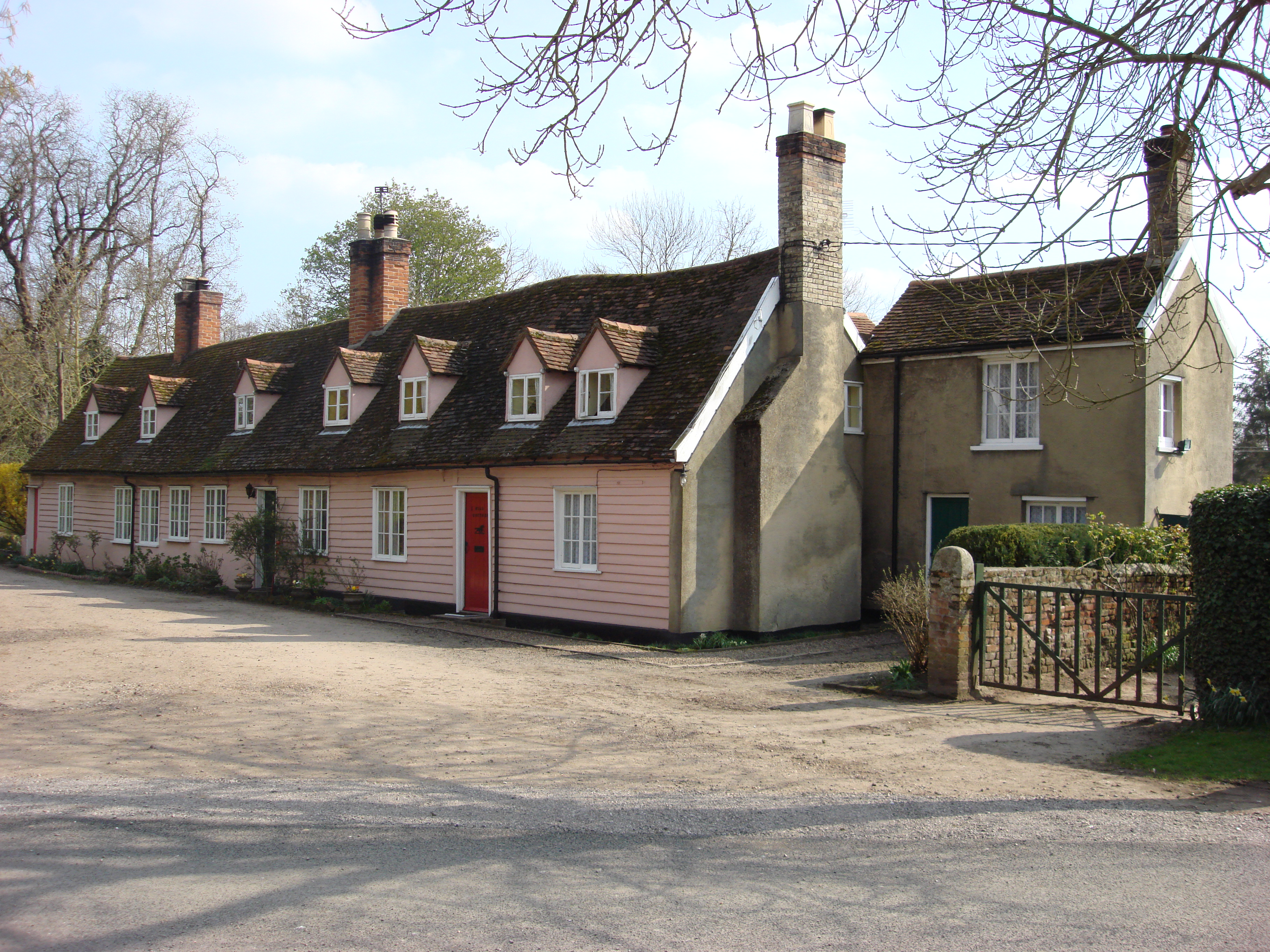
- Mill cottages in Brundon

- Location within Suffolk
- Civil parish: Sudbury
- District: Babergh
- Shire county: Suffolk
- Region: East
- Country: England
- Sovereign state: United Kingdom
- Police: Suffolk
- Fire: Suffolk
- Ambulance: East of England

Brundon is a hamlet in the civil parish of Sudbury, in the Babergh district, in the English county of Suffolk. It is located on the River Stour near the town of Sudbury (its post town). For transport there is the A131 road nearby. Brundon is now popular among local walkers owing to its proximity to the Sudbury water meadows. Brundon was recorded in the Domesday Book as Branduna.

Brundon Hall is a grade II* listed 18th-century building which stands near the former Brundon water mill.

== Notable residents ==
Brundon Mill was home to Derek Taylor, the British journalist and publicist best known for his work as press officer for The Beatles, with whom he worked in 1964 and then from 1968 to 1970, and was one of several associates to earn the moniker "the Fifth Beatle".

== See also ==
- Ballingdon
