= March Town United F.C. =

Association football club in England

Coordinates: 52°33′15.44″N 00°05′09.59″E

March Town United
- Full name: March Town United Football Club
- Nickname: The Hares
- Founded: 1885
- Ground: GER Sports Ground, March
- Chairman: Lee Brownlow
- Manager: Ash Taylor
- League: Eastern Counties League Premier Division
- 2025–26: United Counties League Premier Division South, 4th of 20 (transferred)
| Home colours | Away colours |

March Town United Football Club is a football club based in March, Cambridgeshire, England. They are currently members of the Eastern Counties League Premier Division and play at the GER Sports Ground.

== History ==
The club was established as March Town in 1885. They joined the Peterborough & District League in 1908, but left after a single season. The club rejoined the league in 1911, before leaving in 1913. They subsequently became members of the Cambridgeshire League and were Division One runners-up in 1921–22. However, the club finished bottom of the division the following season. They returned to Division One in 1925, but finished bottom of the table again in 1926–27. Amidst league reorganisation, the club became members of Division 1B in 1928, where they remained until rejoining the Peterborough & District League in 1931.

In 1947–48 March won the Division One title, and moved up to the United Counties League. In 1950 the club were renamed March Town United, having moved to March GER United's GER Sports Ground after World War II. They were United Counties League champions in 1953–54, after which they transferred to the Eastern Counties League. The club won the Cambridgeshire Invitation Cup in 1954–55, beating Cambridge United 3–2 in the final. In 1955–56 March reached the first round of the FA Cup after eight qualifying matches, before losing 4–0 at Brentford; they also finished as runners-up in the Eastern Counties League, a feat repeated in 1960–61.

The 1978–79 season saw March reach the first round of the FA Cup again, this time losing 2–0 at Swindon Town. They won the Eastern Counties League title in 1987–88. The league gained a second division the following season, with March becoming members of the Premier Division. They finished bottom of the Premier Division in 1996–97 and were relegated to Division One. The club finished bottom of Division One in 2000–01, 2001–02, 2006–07 and 2013–14, but avoided being relegated to the county leagues. In 2021 the club were promoted to the Premier Division based on their results in the curtailed 2019–20 and 2020–21 seasons. In 2022 they were transferred to the Premier Division South of the United Counties League.

== Ground ==
The club played at Estover Road, Gaul Drove and Burrowmoor Road before settling at the Avenue in 1923, a ground shared with the cricket club and bequeathed to the town by Mr Morton. After World War II the club moved to the GER Sports Ground.

== Honours ==
- Eastern Counties League
  - Champions 1987–88
- United Counties League
  - Division One champions 1953–54
- Peterborough & District League
  - Division One champions 1947–48
- Cambridgeshire Invitation Cup
  - Winners 1954–55

== Records ==
- Best FA Cup performance: First round, 1955–56, 1978–79
- Best FA Trophy performance: Second qualifying round, 1970–71, 1972–73
- Best FA Vase performance: Fourth round, 2024–25
- Record attendance: 7,500 vs King's Lynn, FA Cup second qualifying round, 1956

== See also ==
- March Town United F.C. players
- March Town United F.C. managers
