= Leiston F.C. =

English football club

Coordinates: 52°12′16″N 1°34′17″E

Leiston
- Full name: Leiston Football Club
- Nickname: The Blues
- Founded: 1880
- Ground: Victory Road, Leiston
- Capacity: 2,250 (250 seated)
- Owner: Andy Crisp
- Chairman: Andy Crisp
- Manager: Chris Wigger
- League: Southern League Premier Division Central
- 2025–26: Southern League Premier Division Central, 10th of 22
- Website: http://www.leistonfc.co.uk
Home colours	Away colours

Leiston Football Club is a football club based in Leiston, Suffolk, England. They are currently members of the Southern League Premier Division Central and play at Victory Road.

== History ==
Established in 1880, the club was initially closely linked to the Richard Garrett Engineering Works. They reached the final of the Suffolk Senior Cup in 1892, 1897 and 1904, losing on each occasion, although the club did win the Junior Cup in 1895. In 1894 Leiston joined the North Suffolk League, which they played in until 1909. In 1900 the club also joined the Ipswich & District League (later the Suffolk & Ipswich League) and were champions in their first three seasons. In 1904 they transferred to the South East Anglian League, but left in 1907 before rejoining in 1911 (when it had been renamed the East Anglian League). Between 1912 and 1914 the club also played in the Ipswich & District League.

After World War I the club was reformed as Leiston Works Athletic and rejoined the Ipswich & District League and the East Anglian League. In 1920 they left the EAL and joined the Essex & Suffolk Border League. At the end of the 1920–21 season the club left both the IDL and ESBL to join the Norfolk & Suffolk League before rejoining the IDL in 1926. After finishing bottom of the table in 1934–35 they were reformed as Leiston and dropped into Division 2B. The club won all seventeen league matches in 1937–38 and were promoted to Division One after defeating Division 2A winners Manningtree Rovers in a play-off.

In 1948 Leiston rejoined the Norfolk & Suffolk League, but transferred back to the Ipswich & District League in 1953. Despite finishing bottom of the Senior Division in 1979–80, the club avoided being relegated as the division was expanded. However, after finishing bottom again in 1981–82 they were relegated. They were promoted back to the Senior Division at the first attempt, also winning the Suffolk Junior Cup, which they retained in 1983–84. Leiston then spent several years as a yo yo club as they were relegated in 1988–89, promoted back in 1989–90, relegated again in 1991–92 and returned to the Senior Division in 1996–96. After finishing third in 2000–01 the club stepped up to Division One of the Eastern Counties League.

The 2003–04 season saw Leiston finish third in Division One, earning promotion to the Premier Division. The club reached the final of the Suffolk Premier Cup three times in succession between 2006 and 2008, but lost on each occasion; 3–2 after extra time against Lowestoft Town in 2006, 8–0 to Ipswich Town reserves in 2007, and on penalties to Needham Market in 2008. In the same season they beat Brentwood Town on penalties to win the East Anglian Cup. In the 2008–09 FA Cup the club reached the first round of the FA Cup for the first time; drawn at home to Conference North club Fleetwood Town, they drew 0–0 in front of a record crowd of 1,250, before losing the replay 2–0.

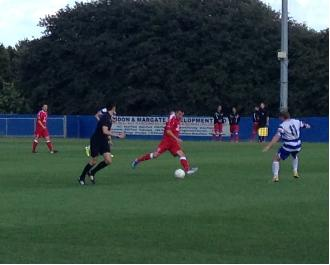
Leiston (in red) playing Margate in 2013

In 2010–11 Leiston won the Eastern Counties League Premier Division, earning promotion to Division One North of the Isthmian League. In 2011–12 they won Division One North, achieving back-to-back promotions and moving up to the Isthmian League Premier Division. They finished fifth in the Premier Division in 2017–18, going on to lose 1–0 in the play-off semi-finals to Dulwich Hamlet. The club were transferred to the Premier Division Central of the Southern League at the end of the 2017–18 season as part of the restructuring of the non-League pyramid.

== Ground ==
Leiston initially played at the old Recreation Ground, today known as Park Hill, with players changing in the White Horse Hotel or at the Works Hall. In 1921 they moved to their current ground on Victory Road, then known as the Leiston Works Athletic Association, after Garretts bought the ground. It was later renamed the Leiston Town Athletic Association.

== Current squad ==
As of 11 February 2026

Note: Flags indicate national team as defined under FIFA eligibility rules; some limited exceptions apply. Players may hold more than one non-FIFA nationality.

Pos.	Nation	Player
GK	ENG	Oliver Dawson
GK	ENG	Billy Johnson
GK	ENG	Marcus Mehew
DF	ENG	Ben Batho
DF	IRL	Kyle Callan-McFadden
DF	ENG	Seb Dunbar (captain)
DF	CAN	Wyatt Hill
DF	ENG	Eddie Jackson
DF	ENG	Billy Jordan
DF	ENG	Ethan Oldman
MF	ENG	Fraser Alexander
MF	BER	Willie Clemons
MF	ENG	Jude Frostick

Pos.	Nation	Player
MF	ENG	Ollie Griggs
MF	ENG	Mitchell Jackson
MF	ENG	Ryan Jarvis
MF	ENG	Jack Manly
MF	ENG	Adam Mills
MF	TLS	João Rangel
MF	ENG	Cameron Rayworth
MF	ENG	Harvey Sayer
MF	ENG	Billy Walsh
FW	ENG	Charlie Atkin
FW	ENG	Ronnie Blois
FW	ENG	Ben Fowkes
FW	ENG	Joe McNeill

The Southern Football League does not use a squad numbering system.

== Management and coaching staff ==
=== Boardroom ===
As of 24 December 2024

Position	Name
Chairman	Andy Crisp

=== Current staff ===
Position	Name
Manager	(England) Chris Wigger
Head Coach	(New Zealand) Lee Norfolk
Player-coach	(England) Ryan Jarvis
Head of Football Strategy	(England) Darren Eadie

=== Managerial history ===
Period	Manager	Notes
2006–2007	(England) Jason Dozzell	
2008–2010	Carl Chenery	
2010–2013	Mark Morsley	
2013	Danny Laws	
2013	Steve Pitt	
2013–2014	(England) Steve Ball	
2014–2016	(England) Richard Wilkins	
2016–2018	Glen Driver	
2018–2019	(England) Stuart Boardley	
2019	Ian Cornforth	
2019–2020	Glen Driver	
2020–2024	Darren Eadie & Chris Wigger	
2024–	Chris Wigger	

== Honours ==
- Isthmian League
  - Division One North champions 2011–12
- Eastern Counties League
  - Premier Division champions 2010–11
  - Division One Cup winners 2001–02
- Suffolk & Ipswich League
  - Champions 1900–01, 1901–02, 1902–03
  - Division 2B champions 1937–38
- East Anglian Cup
  - Winners 2007–08
- Suffolk Premier Cup
  - Winners 2017–18, 2018–19
- Suffolk Junior Cup
  - Winners 1894–95, 1982–83, 1983–84

== Records ==
- Best FA Cup performance: First round, 2008–09
- Best FA Trophy performance: Fourth round, 2022–23
- Best FA Vase performance: Quarter-finals, 2010–11
- Record attendance: 1,250 v Fleetwood Town, FA Cup first round, 8 November 2008
- Most league goals: Lee McGlone 60
- Most league appearances: Gareth Heath, 201

== See also ==
- Leiston F.C. players
- Leiston F.C. managers
