= Halstead Town F.C. =

Association football club in England

Coordinates: 51°56′47.31″N 0°37′57.30″E

Halstead Town
- Full name: Halstead Town Football Club
- Nickname: The Humbugs
- Founded: 1879
- Ground: Rosemary Lane, Halstead
- Chairman: Carl Pearse
- Manager: Mark McLean
- League: Essex Senior League
- 2024–25: Essex Senior League, 13th of 20
Home colours	Away colours

Halstead Town Football Club is a football club based in Halstead, Essex, England. They are currently members of the Essex Senior League and play at Rosemary Lane.

== History ==
The club was established in 1879 as Halstead Football Club following a meeting in the town hall by a group of 16 men. Due to a lack of football infrastructure in rural areas at the time the club played only occasional friendlies until they joined the newly formed North Essex League in 1895. In 1901–02 the club won their first trophy, the Essex Junior Cup, with a 2–0 victory over Chingford in the final. During the first half of the 20th century the club played in the Halstead & District League and the Haverhill & District League.

After World War II the club added "Town" to their name and joined Division Two of the North Essex League. They were swiftly promoted to Division One, before joining the Essex & Suffolk Border League. They were Premier Division runners-up in 1949–50 and again in 1954–55 before winning the league and League Cup double in 1957–58, beating Lakenheath 11–2 on aggregate in the final of the League Cup. They were Premier Division runners-up the following season and also retained the League Cup with a 6–2 aggregate win over Clacton Town reserves. The club were league runners-up again in 1960–61 before winning a second Premier Division title in 1968–69. They won the League Cup for a third time in 1973–74 with a 3–0 win over Brantham Athletic in a replay. After finishing as runners-up in 1976–77 the club won a third Premier Division title the following season.

In 1980 Halstead joined the Essex Senior League in 1980. In 1988 they were founder members of Division One of the Eastern Counties League, and finished as runners-up in its first season, earning promotion to the Premier Division. In 1993–94 they were Premier Division runners-up, and also won the Essex Senior Trophy, beating Canvey Island 2–0 in the final. They went on to win two consecutive Premier Division titles in 1994–95 and 1995–96, also winning the League Cup in the latter season with a 4–0 win over Fakenham Town in the final. The following season they won the Essex Senior Trophy for a second time.

In 2000–01 Halstead were relegated to Division One after finishing bottom of the Premier Division. They won Division One and the Division One Cup in 2002–03 and were promoted back to the Premier Division. They won the League Cup in 2004–05, but were relegated to Division One again at the end of the 2006–07 season after finishing bottom of the Premier Division. When Division One was split in 2018 the club were placed in Division One South. In 2021–22 the club finished fourth in the division, qualifying for the promotion play-offs. After beating Benfleet 2–1 in the semi-finals, they defeated Buckhurst Hill by the same scoreline in the final, earning promotion to the Essex Senior League.

== Ground ==
In their early years the club played at various grounds in the town including Ravens Meadow, King George Playing Field and Coggeshall Pieces. By World War II they were playing at Three Gates, and the ground was commandeered by the RAF during the war for agriculture. When football restarted after the war, the club temporarily played at the Courtaulds Sports Ground, before moving to Rosemary Lane in 1948. The opening match against Eton Manor on 21 August 1948 attracted a crowd of 1,800. This was exceeded the following year when 4,000 watched an Essex Senior Cup match against Walthamstow Avenue. A 512-seat grandstand was opened in 1950 and remains the only cover for spectators. Railings were installed around the pitch, taken from North Sea defences at Clacton-on-Sea. Floodlights were erected in 1989.

Two players died at Rosemary Lane in the 1950s and 1960s; Alf Partner of Heybridge Swifts collapsed on the pitch and died in the early 1950s and Halstead defender Bruce Stewart choked to death on the pitch the early 1960s at the age of 22. Another death occurred at the ground when a drunken visitor to a funfair missed the tub of water they were aiming for after jumping off a high dive ladder.

== Honours ==
- Eastern Counties League
  - Premier Division champions 1994–95, 1995–96
  - Division One champions 2002–03
  - League Cup winners 1995–96, 2004–05
  - Division One Cup winners 2002–03
- Essex & Suffolk Border League
  - Premier Division champions 1957–58, 1968–69, 1977–78
  - League Cup winners 1957–58, 1958–59, 1973–74
- Essex Senior Trophy
  - Winners 1992–93, 1996–97

== Records ==
- Best FA Cup performance: Third qualifying round, 1993–94, 1998–99
- Best FA Vase performance: Fourth round, 1993–94, 1994–95
- Record attendance: 4,000 vs Walthamstow Avenue, Essex Senior Cup, 1949

== See also ==
- Halstead Town F.C. players
- Halstead Town F.C. managers
