= Needham Market F.C. =

English football club

Coordinates: 52°09′03″N 1°02′41″E

Needham Market
- Full name: Needham Market Football Club
- Nickname: The Marketmen
- Founded: 1919
- Ground: Bloomfields, Needham Market
- Chairman: Keith Nunn
- Manager: Tom Rothery
- League: Southern League Premier Division Central
- 2025–26: Southern League Premier Division Central, 6th of 22
Home colours	Away colours

Needham Market Football Club is a football club based in Needham Market, Suffolk, England. They are currently members of the Southern League Premier Division Central and play at Bloomfields.

== History ==
Although records show the existence of a Needham Market Football Club during the late 1890s, the modern club was officially established in 1919. They subsequently joined the Ipswich & District League. After finishing as runners-up in Division 3A in 1930–31 and 1931–32, the club were promoted to Division Two A. They went on to win Division Two A in 1932–33 and were runners-up the following season. After World War II they won the Division Two title in 1946–47 and went on to win Division One in 1952–53. The club won the League Cup in 1977–78 and again in 1979–80. However, they finished bottom of the Senior Division in 1983–84 and were relegated to Division One. However, they won the Suffolk Junior Cup the following season.

In 1986–87 Needham Market were Division One runners-up, earning promotion back to the Senior Division. They went on to win the Suffolk Senior Cup in 1989–90. In 1995–96 the club were Senior Division champions, and were promoted to Division One of the Eastern Counties League. They were Division One runners-up in 2004–05 and were promoted to the Premier Division, winning the Suffolk Senior Cup in the same season. In 2006–07 the club win the East Anglian Cup, before going on to finish as runners-up in the Premier Division and win the League Challenge Cup and the Suffolk Premier Cup in 2007–08, as well as reaching the semi-finals of the FA Vase, losing 4–2 on aggregate to Kirkham & Wesham.

The 2009–10 season saw Needham Market win the Premier Division title and the League Cup double, earning promotion to Division One North of the Isthmian League. In their first season in Division One, Needham finished as runners-up, qualifying for the promotion play-offs. However, they lost 3–1 at home to Brentwood Town in the semi-finals. The following season the club finished third and reached the play-off final, but lost 1–0 to Enfield Town. They qualified for the play-offs again after finishing fifth in 2013–14, this time losing 1–0 to Witham Town in the semi-finals. The club went on to win the division the following season, earning promotion to the Premier Division. In 2016–17 they won the Suffolk Premier Cup for a second time.

Needham Market were transferred to the Premier Central division of the Southern League at the end of the 2017–18 season as part of the restructuring of the non-League pyramid. In 2019–20 the club won the Suffolk Premier Cup, defeating Lowestoft Town 4–3 on aggregate in the two-legged final. In 2022–23 they reached the first round of the FA Cup for the first time, losing 2–0 at Burton Albion. The club were Premier Division Central champions in 2023–24, earning promotion to the National League North. They finished third-from-bottom of the National League North the following season and were relegated back to the Southern League's Premier Division Central.

=== Reserve team ===
The club's reserve team played in the Essex & Suffolk Border League, winning Division Two in 1998–99. In 2013 they joined Division One of the Eastern Counties League.

== Ground ==
The club initially played at Young's Meadow, before relocating to Crowley Park. In 1996 they moved to a new ground, buying the site after former player Arthur Rodwell died and left the club money, which was used together with a grant from the National Lottery. The new ground was named Bloomfields after former player and clubman Derrick Bloomfield.

A new record attendance of 750 was set for a Suffolk Premier Cup match against Ipswich Town reserves during the 2006–07 season. This was beaten when a crowd of 1,375 watched the FA Vase semi-final against Kirkham & Wesham in 2008. Another new record was set on 26 October 2013 when 1,748 saw the club play Cambridge United in an FA Cup fourth qualifying round game.

In 2018 a 3G pitch with a 50-seat stand and new changing rooms were installed within the Bloomfields complex, which is used by the reserve team.

== Management and coaching staff ==
=== Boardroom ===
As of 13 November 2020

Position	Name
Chairman	(England) Keith Nunn

=== Current staff ===
Position	Name
Assistant Manager	(England) Tom Rothery
Player-Assistant Manager & Goalkeeping Coach	(England) Nathan Munson
First Team Coach	(England) Patrick Brothers
Sports Therapist	(England) Kim Baldwin

== Honours ==
- Southern League
  - Premier Division Central champions 2023–24
- Isthmian League
  - Division One North champions 2014–15
- Eastern Counties League
  - Premier Division champions 2009–10
  - League Cup winners 2007–08, 2009–10
- Suffolk & Ipswich League
  - Senior Division champions 1995–96
  - Division One champions 1952–53
  - Division Two champions 1946–47
  - Division Two A champions 1932–33
  - League Cup winners 1977–78, 1979–80
- Suffolk Premier Cup
  - Winners 2007–08, 2016–17, 2019–20
- Suffolk Senior Cup
  - Winners 1989–90, 2004–05
- Suffolk Junior Cup
  - Winners 1984–85
- East Anglian Cup
  - Winners 2006–07

== Records ==
- Best FA Cup performance: First round, 2022–23
- Best FA Trophy performance: Quarter-finals, 2021–22
- Best FA Vase performance: Semi-finals, 2007–08
- Record attendance: 1,784 vs Cambridge United, FA Cup fourth qualifying round, 26 October 2013
- Biggest win: 10–1 vs Ipswich Wanderers, 1 September 2007, FA Cup preliminary round
- Heaviest defeat: 6–0 vs Wingate & Finchley, 8 September 2015, Isthmian League Premier Division
- Most appearances: Rhys Barber, 365 (2006–2012)
- Most goals: Sam Newson, 134 (2010–2015)
- Most goals in a season: Craig Parker, 40 (2010–11)

== See also ==
- Needham Market F.C. players
- Needham Market F.C. managers
