= 1972–73 United Counties League =

The 1972–73 United Counties League season was the 66th in the history of the United Counties League, a football competition in England. At the end of the previous season leagues top division was renamed Premier Division, while lower divisions was renamed Division One and Division Two.

== Premier Division ==
United Counties League Premier Division
- Season: 1972–73
- Champions: Rushden Town
- Matches played: 240
- Goals scored: 778 (3.24 per match)

The Premier Division featured 14 clubs which competed in the division last season, along with two new clubs:

- Long Buckby, promoted from old Division Two
- Stamford, transferred from the Midland League

=== League table ===
Pos	Team	Pld	W	D	L	GF	GA	GD	Pts
1	Rushden Town	30	17	11	2	71	28	+43	45
2	Spalding United	30	15	9	6	55	41	+14	39
3	Biggleswade Town	30	14	9	7	63	33	+30	37
4	Stamford	30	13	9	8	52	44	+8	35
5	Irthlingborough Diamonds	30	11	11	8	54	48	+6	33
6	Kempston Rovers	30	13	6	11	67	47	+20	32
7	Bourne Town	30	13	6	11	61	54	+7	32
8	Potton United	30	10	10	10	46	42	+4	30
9	Long Buckby	30	8	13	9	51	50	+1	29
10	Desborough Town	30	10	9	11	46	46	0	29
11	Northampton Spencer	30	9	8	13	41	60	−19	26
12	Wootton Blue Cross	30	8	9	13	29	45	−16	25
13	Rothwell Town	30	7	10	13	38	51	−13	24
14	Ampthill Town	30	6	11	13	35	52	−17	23
15	Holbeach United	30	8	7	15	44	68	−24	23
16	Wolverton Town	30	6	6	18	25	69	−44	18

Source: nonleaguematters
Rules for classification: 1) points; 2) goal difference; 3) number of goals scored.

== Division One ==
United Counties League Division One
- Season: 1972–73
- Champions: Olney Town

The previous season Division Two changed name to Division One before this season. The Division One featured 17 clubs which competed in the Division Two last season, along with 2 new clubs:

- Eynesbury Rovers, relegated from old Division One
- V S Rugby, promoted from old Division Three

=== League table ===
Pos	Team	Pld	W	D	L	GF	GA	GR	Pts	Promotion or relegation
1	Olney Town	36	24	6	6	70	35	2.000	54	
2	Bedford Eaglets	36	22	8	6	85	41	2.073	52	
3	Higham Town	36	22	6	8	80	47	1.702	50	
4	British Timken Athletic	36	19	8	9	75	41	1.829	46	
5	Irthlingborough Diamonds reserves	36	18	10	8	59	33	1.788	46	
6	Stewart & Lloyds Corby	36	18	9	9	71	42	1.690	45	
7	V S Rugby	36	17	9	10	62	46	1.348	43	
8	Corby Gainsborough	36	16	8	12	64	47	1.362	40	
9	Rushden Town reserves	36	14	11	11	78	46	1.696	39	
10	Raunds Town	36	17	3	16	68	60	1.133	37	
11	Kettering Park Wanderers	36	13	8	15	54	59	0.915	34	
12	Biggleswade Town reserves	36	12	8	16	57	66	0.864	32	
13	Desborough Town reserves	36	13	5	18	67	83	0.807	31	
14	Rothwell Town reserves	36	11	9	16	59	74	0.797	31	
15	Sharnbrook	36	11	6	19	60	81	0.741	28	
16	Eynesbury Rovers	36	10	7	19	41	69	0.594	27	
17	St Neots Town reserves	36	6	9	21	44	81	0.543	21	
18	British Timken Duston	36	5	9	22	33	104	0.317	19	
19	Wolverton Town reserves	36	2	5	29	33	105	0.314	9	Resigned from the league

Source: nonleaguematters
Rules for classification: 1) points; 2) goal ratio; 3) number of goals scored.

== Division Two ==
United Counties League Division Two
- Season: 1972–73
- Champions: Belsize
- Promoted: Belsize; Northampton ON Chenecks

The previous season Division Three changed name to Division Two before this season. The Division Two featured 18 clubs which competed in the Division Three last season, no new clubs joined the division this season.

=== League table ===
Pos	Team	Pld	W	D	L	GF	GA	GR	Pts	Promotion or relegation
1	Belsize	34	28	3	3	116	19	6.105	59	Promoted to Division One
2	Northampton ON Chenecks	34	26	7	1	104	37	2.811	59	Promoted to Division One
3	Stewart & Lloyds Corby reserves	34	24	6	4	70	28	2.500	54	
4	Woodford United	34	23	6	5	71	38	1.868	52	
5	Irchester United	34	19	7	8	82	49	1.673	45	
6	Geddington Montrose	34	17	9	8	70	41	1.707	43	
7	Kempston Rovers reserves	34	16	6	12	83	53	1.566	38	
8	Deanshanger Athletic	34	12	7	15	70	86	0.814	31	
9	Bedford Avenue	34	12	6	16	58	55	1.055	30	
10	Raunds Town reserves	34	11	8	15	77	81	0.951	30	
11	Ampthill Town reserves	34	12	5	17	48	60	0.800	29	
12	Wootton Blue Cross reserves	34	10	7	17	42	61	0.689	27	
13	Higham Rovers	34	11	4	19	54	82	0.659	26	
14	Higham Town reserves	34	10	5	19	62	63	0.984	25	
15	Bedford United	34	9	4	21	65	82	0.793	22	
16	Blisworth	34	10	2	22	57	101	0.564	22	
17	Olney Town reserves	34	4	7	23	37	95	0.389	15	
18	British Timken Duston reserves	34	2	1	31	22	157	0.140	5	

Source: nonleaguematters
Rules for classification: 1) points; 2) goal ratio; 3) number of goals scored.
