= 1975–76 United Counties League =

The 1975–76 United Counties League season was the 69th in the history of the United Counties League, a football competition in England.

== Premier Division ==
United Counties League Premier Division
- Season: 1975–76
- Champions: Stamford
- Relegated: Biggleswade Town
- Matches played: 380
- Goals scored: 1,121 (2.95 per match)

The Premier Division featured 18 clubs which competed in the division last season, along with two new clubs, promoted from Division One:

- Olney Town
- Stewart & Lloyds Corby

=== League table ===
Pos	Team	Pld	W	D	L	GF	GA	GD	Pts	Promotion or relegation
1	Stamford	38	27	7	4	106	33	+73	61	
2	Spalding United	38	21	11	6	65	38	+27	53	
3	Kempston Rovers	38	17	12	9	54	40	+14	46	
4	Potton United	38	20	5	13	58	39	+19	45	
5	Irthlingborough Diamonds	38	18	9	11	65	46	+19	45	
6	Wolverton Town	38	16	12	10	58	43	+15	44	
7	Long Buckby	38	19	5	14	75	48	+27	43	
8	Ampthill Town	38	15	12	11	64	60	+4	42	
9	Desborough Town	38	14	13	11	49	43	+6	41	
10	Vauxhall Motors	38	15	10	13	61	55	+6	40	
11	Bourne Town	38	15	9	14	62	50	+12	39	
12	Stewart & Lloyds Corby	38	15	9	14	60	56	+4	39	
13	Rothwell Town	38	10	17	11	42	54	−12	37	
14	Rushden Town	38	14	9	15	70	46	+24	35 (Note: Rushden Town were deducted two points.)	
15	Holbeach United	38	12	10	16	57	79	−22	34	
16	Wootton Blue Cross	38	12	9	17	43	56	−13	33	
17	St Neots Town	38	12	7	19	41	57	−16	31	
18	Northampton Spencer	38	7	11	20	36	65	−29	25	
19	Olney Town	38	7	7	24	33	80	−47	21	
20	Biggleswade Town	38	1	2	35	22	133	−111	4	Relegated to Division One

Source: nonleaguematters
Rules for classification: 1) points; 2) goal difference; 3) number of goals scored.

== Division One ==
United Counties League Division One
- Season: 1975–76
- Champions: Geddington Montrose
- Promoted: Buckingham Town
- Relegated: Woodford United

The Division One featured 14 clubs which competed in the division last season, along with 4 new clubs:

- Leighton Town, relegated from the Premier Division
- Geddington Montrose, promoted from Division Two
- Buckingham Town, promoted from Division Two
- Kempston Rovers reserves, promoted from Division Two

=== League table ===
Pos	Team	Pld	W	D	L	GF	GA	GR	Pts	Promotion or relegation
1	Geddington Montrose	34	22	10	2	67	29	2.310	54	
2	Buckingham Town	34	21	10	3	72	24	3.000	52	Promoted to the Premier Division
3	Eynesbury Rovers	34	16	11	7	57	34	1.676	43	
4	Corby Gainsborough	34	18	7	9	50	30	1.667	43	
5	Rushden Town reserves	34	13	15	6	56	36	1.556	41	
6	British Timken Athletic	34	15	11	8	56	44	1.273	41	
7	Irchester United	34	14	11	9	78	53	1.472	39	
8	Irthlingborough Diamonds reserves	34	14	8	12	67	57	1.175	36	
9	Raunds Town	34	12	11	11	53	56	0.946	35	
10	Leighton Town	34	11	12	11	60	51	1.176	34	Transferred to the South Midlands League
11	Northampton ON Chenecks	34	14	6	14	50	50	1.000	34	
12	Higham Town	34	11	10	13	52	56	0.929	32	
13	Kempston Rovers reserves	34	9	11	14	39	49	0.796	29	
14	Burton Park Wanderers	34	8	7	19	44	59	0.746	23	
15	Sharnbrook	34	7	9	18	32	63	0.508	23	
16	Belsize	34	7	8	19	45	77	0.584	22	
17	Desborough Town reserves	34	6	8	20	55	85	0.647	20	
18	Woodford United	34	3	5	26	36	116	0.310	11	Relegated to Division Two

Source: nonleaguematters
Rules for classification: 1) points; 2) goal ratio; 3) number of goals scored.

== Division Two ==
United Counties League Division Two
- Season: 1975–76
- Champions: Wootton Blue Cross reserves
- Promoted: Wootton Blue Cross reserves Newport Pagnell Town

The Division Two featured 17 clubs which competed in the division last season, along with 3 new clubs:

- Byfield Athletic
- Wolverton Town reserves
- St Neots Town reserves

=== League table ===
Pos	Team	Pld	W	D	L	GF	GA	GD	Pts	Promotion or relegation
1	Wootton Blue Cross reserves	38	28	6	4	85	29	+56	62	Promoted to Division One
2	Newport Pagnell Town	38	25	9	4	89	28	+61	59	Promoted to Division One
3	Ampthill Town reserves	38	25	6	7	80	39	+41	56	
4	Northampton Spencer reserves	38	21	9	8	80	38	+42	51	
5	Byfield Athletic	38	22	6	10	73	42	+31	50	
6	Stewart & Lloyds Corby reserves	38	20	5	13	73	39	+34	45	
7	Blisworth	38	17	7	14	57	56	+1	41	
8	Deanshanger Athletic	38	16	8	14	60	55	+5	40	
9	Wolverton Town reserves	38	16	8	14	60	55	+5	40	
10	Vauxhall Motors reserves	38	15	10	13	66	66	0	40	
11	Bedford Avenue	38	15	7	16	60	67	−7	37	
12	Olney Town reserves	38	15	6	17	54	77	−23	36	
13	Long Buckby reserves	38	14	7	17	52	56	−4	35	
14	British Timken Duston	38	11	6	21	60	75	−15	28	
15	Bedford United	38	11	6	21	59	79	−20	28	
16	St Neots Town reserves	38	10	7	21	63	85	−22	27	
17	Potton United reserves	38	8	6	24	48	83	−35	22	
18	Higham Town reserves	38	7	7	24	41	82	−41	21	
19	Raunds Town reserves	38	8	5	25	49	96	−47	21	
20	Higham Rovers	38	9	3	26	41	103	−62	21	Resigned from the league

Source: nonleaguematters
Rules for classification: 1) points; 2) goal ratio; 3) number of goals scored.
