= 1976–77 United Counties League =

The 1976–77 United Counties League season was the 70th in the history of the United Counties League, a football competition in England.

== Premier Division ==
United Counties League Premier Division
- Season: 1976–77
- Champions: Irthlingborough Diamonds
- Relegated: Vauxhall Motors
- Matches played: 380
- Goals scored: 1,072 (2.82 per match)

The Premier Division featured 19 clubs which competed in the division last season, along with one new club:

- Buckingham Town, promoted from Division One

=== League table ===
Pos	Team	Pld	W	D	L	GF	GA	GD	Pts	Promotion or relegation
1	Irthlingborough Diamonds	38	22	11	5	64	29	+35	55	
2	Stamford	38	24	6	8	79	39	+40	54	
3	Spalding United	38	22	9	7	74	34	+40	53	
4	St Neots Town	38	22	8	8	55	40	+15	52	
5	Rushden Town	38	19	12	7	70	33	+37	50	
6	Kempston Rovers	38	19	12	7	66	34	+32	50	
7	Potton United	38	19	8	11	58	46	+12	46	
8	Wolverton Town	38	18	8	12	57	40	+17	44	
9	Desborough Town	38	15	11	12	61	53	+8	41	
10	Long Buckby	38	16	8	14	61	57	+4	40	
11	Buckingham Town	38	14	8	16	59	58	+1	36	
12	Stewart & Lloyds Corby	38	10	11	17	46	56	−10	31	
13	Wootton Blue Cross	38	10	10	18	42	62	−20	30	
14	Bourne Town	38	9	11	18	51	66	−15	29	
15	Northampton Spencer	38	10	9	19	42	62	−20	29	
16	Ampthill Town	38	10	7	21	40	73	−33	27	
17	Rothwell Town	38	9	9	20	38	70	−32	27	
18	Olney Town	38	6	13	19	29	57	−28	25	
19	Holbeach United	38	6	9	23	48	92	−44	21	
20	Vauxhall Motors	38	5	10	23	32	71	−39	20	Relegated to Division One

Source: nonleaguematters
Rules for classification: 1) points; 2) goal difference; 3) number of goals scored.

== Division One ==
United Counties League Division One
- Season: 1976–77
- Champions: Eynesbury Rovers
- Promoted: Eynesbury Rovers
- Relegated: None

The Division One featured 15 clubs which competed in the division last season, along with 3 new clubs:

- Biggleswade Town, relegated from the Premier Division
- Wootton Blue Cross reserves, promoted from Division Two
- Newport Pagnell Town, promoted from Division Two

Also, Belsize changed name to Milton Keynes Borough.

=== League table ===
Pos	Team	Pld	W	D	L	GF	GA	GD	Pts	Promotion or relegation
1	Eynesbury Rovers	34	20	10	4	54	20	+34	50	Promoted to the Premier Division
2	Milton Keynes Borough	34	19	10	5	73	31	+42	48	
3	Kempston Rovers reserves	34	21	6	7	72	47	+25	48	
4	Geddington Montrose	34	18	10	6	61	36	+25	46	
5	Irchester United	34	18	7	9	68	34	+34	43	
6	Northampton ON Chenecks	34	16	10	8	54	35	+19	42	
7	Rushden Town reserves	34	14	12	8	53	38	+15	40	
8	Irthlingborough Diamonds reserves	34	13	11	10	57	52	+5	37	
9	Corby Gainsborough	34	14	5	15	55	58	−3	33	
10	Desborough Town reserves	34	13	7	14	56	68	−12	33	
11	British Timken Athletic	34	13	6	15	50	57	−7	32	
12	Sharnbrook	34	9	9	16	56	71	−15	27	
13	Higham Town	34	9	8	17	38	66	−28	26	
14	Newport Pagnell Town	34	6	11	17	36	48	−12	23	
15	Wootton Blue Cross reserves	34	6	11	17	42	59	−17	23	
16	Raunds Town	34	5	13	16	33	63	−30	23	
17	Burton Park Wanderers	34	6	7	21	32	68	−36	19	
18	Biggleswade Town	34	4	11	19	30	69	−39	19	

Source: nonleaguematters
Rules for classification: 1) points; 2) goal ratio; 3) number of goals scored.

== Division Two ==
United Counties League Division Two
- Season: 1976–77
- Champions: Stewart & Lloyds Corby reserves
- Promoted: Stewart & Lloyds Corby reserves Byfield Athletic

The Division Two featured 17 clubs which competed in the division last season, along with 1 new club:

- Woodford United, relegated from Division One

=== League table ===
Pos	Team	Pld	W	D	L	GF	GA	GD	Pts	Promotion or relegation
1	Stewart & Lloyds Corby reserves	32	26	4	2	76	21	+55	56	Promoted to Division One
2	Byfield Athletic	32	19	9	4	85	32	+53	47	Promoted to Division One
3	Ampthill Town reserves	32	19	6	7	53	32	+21	44	
4	Northampton Spencer reserves	32	19	3	10	63	39	+24	41	
5	Long Buckby reserves	32	16	7	9	48	38	+10	39	
6	Olney Town reserves	32	16	2	14	49	39	+10	34	
7	St Neots Town reserves	32	12	8	12	54	52	+2	32	
8	Deanshanger Athletic	32	13	5	14	61	58	+3	31	
9	Blisworth	32	11	8	13	53	53	0	30	
10	British Timken Duston	32	9	11	12	40	42	−2	29	
11	Bedford Avenue	32	11	7	14	33	44	−11	29	
12	Bedford United	32	8	10	14	48	64	−16	26	
13	Wolverton Town reserves	32	9	7	16	50	59	−9	25	
14	Vauxhall Motors reserves	32	10	3	19	46	66	−20	23	Resigned from the league
15	Woodford United	32	8	6	18	48	84	−36	22	
16	Higham Town reserves	32	7	7	18	39	59	−20	21	
17	Raunds Town reserves	32	5	5	22	36	100	−64	15	
18	Potton United reserves	0	0	0	0	0	0	0	0	Club folded, record expunged

Source: nonleaguematters
Rules for classification: 1) points; 2) goal ratio; 3) number of goals scored.
