= 1977–78 United Counties League =

The 1977–78 United Counties League season was the 71st in the history of the United Counties League, a football competition in England.

== Premier Division ==
United Counties League Premier Division
- Season: 1977–78
- Champions: Stamford
- Matches played: 380
- Goals scored: 1,014 (2.67 per match)

The Premier Division featured 19 clubs which competed in the division last season, along with one new club:

- Eynesbury Rovers, promoted from Division One

=== League table ===
Pos	Team	Pld	W	D	L	GF	GA	GD	Pts	Promotion or relegation
1	Stamford	38	30	2	6	93	31	+62	62	
2	Rushden Town	38	22	8	8	66	29	+37	52	
3	Wolverton Town	38	19	10	9	54	35	+19	48	
4	Spalding United	38	21	6	11	49	41	+8	48	Transferred to the Midland League
5	Rothwell Town	38	14	16	8	45	41	+4	44	
6	Irthlingborough Diamonds	38	19	5	14	73	50	+23	43	
7	Stewart & Lloyds Corby	38	16	10	12	46	40	+6	42	
8	Buckingham Town	38	14	13	11	44	39	+5	41	
9	St Neots Town	38	15	10	13	46	45	+1	40	
10	Olney Town	38	15	9	14	56	44	+12	39	
11	Desborough Town	38	13	12	13	62	55	+7	38	
12	Kempston Rovers	38	16	6	16	50	47	+3	38	
13	Wootton Blue Cross	38	11	13	14	43	50	−7	35	
14	Long Buckby	38	10	13	15	42	50	−8	33	
15	Potton United	38	12	9	17	46	55	−9	33	
16	Ampthill Town	38	9	13	16	44	66	−22	31	
17	Bourne Town	38	8	11	19	53	78	−25	27	
18	Northampton Spencer	38	7	13	18	41	66	−25	27	
19	Eynesbury Rovers	38	5	13	20	37	69	−32	23	
20	Holbeach United	38	3	10	25	24	83	−59	16	

Source: nonleaguematters
Rules for classification: 1) points; 2) goal difference; 3) number of goals scored.

== Division One ==
United Counties League Division One
- Season: 1977–78
- Champions: Northampton ON Chenecks
- Relegated: Burton Park Wanderers; Sharnbrook

The Division One featured 17 clubs which competed in the division last season, along with 3 new clubs:

- Vauxhall Motors, relegated from the Premier Division
- Stewart & Lloyds Corby reserves, promoted from Division Two
- Byfield Athletic, promoted from Division Two

=== League table ===
Pos	Team	Pld	W	D	L	GF	GA	GD	Pts	Promotion or relegation
1	Northampton ON Chenecks	38	30	5	3	86	36	+50	65	
2	Milton Keynes Borough	38	23	5	10	89	45	+44	51	
3	Geddington Montrose	38	20	10	8	74	43	+31	50	
4	Vauxhall Motors	38	22	5	11	71	41	+30	49	
5	Newport Pagnell Town	38	19	9	10	67	39	+28	47	
6	Irchester United	38	20	6	12	49	38	+11	46	
7	Corby Gainsborough	38	15	14	9	51	44	+7	44	
8	Biggleswade Town	38	17	7	14	51	44	+7	41	
9	Wootton Blue Cross reserves	38	13	12	13	56	59	−3	38	
10	Irthlingborough Diamonds reserves	38	13	11	14	48	55	−7	37	
11	Stewart & Lloyds Corby reserves	38	12	11	15	61	65	−4	35	
12	Higham Town	38	10	14	14	55	57	−2	34	
13	Rushden Town reserves	38	11	11	16	52	60	−8	33	
14	Byfield Athletic	38	14	5	19	62	75	−13	33	
15	British Timken Athletic	38	12	8	18	58	73	−15	32	
16	Desborough Town reserves	38	13	5	20	65	80	−15	31	
17	Kempston Rovers reserves	38	13	4	21	56	79	−23	30	
18	Raunds Town	38	8	9	21	41	65	−24	25	
19	Burton Park Wanderers	38	9	7	22	42	77	−35	25	Relegated to Division Two
20	Sharnbrook	38	3	8	27	34	93	−59	14	Relegated to Division Two

Source: nonleaguematters
Rules for classification: 1) points; 2) goal ratio; 3) number of goals scored.

== Division Two ==
United Counties League Division Two
- Season: 1977–78
- Champions: Northampton Spencer reserves
- Promoted: Northampton Spencer reserves Ampthill Town reserves

The Division Two featured 14 clubs which competed in the division last season, along with 3 new clubs:

- Towcester Town, transferred from the South Midlands League
- Ford Sports Daventry
- Eynesbury Rovers reserves

=== League table ===
Pos	Team	Pld	W	D	L	GF	GA	GD	Pts	Promotion or relegation
1	Northampton Spencer reserves	32	22	6	4	86	23	+63	50	Promoted to Division One
2	Ampthill Town reserves	32	23	3	6	69	25	+44	49	Promoted to Division One
3	Olney Town reserves	32	21	5	6	67	26	+41	47	
4	St Neots Town reserves	32	19	7	6	79	30	+49	45	
5	Wolverton Town reserves	32	17	6	9	57	44	+13	40	
6	Ford Sports Daventry	32	17	4	11	59	42	+17	38	
7	Bedford United	32	14	6	12	44	58	−14	34	
8	Long Buckby reserves	32	12	9	11	54	45	+9	33	
9	British Timken Duston	32	11	7	14	46	41	+5	29	
10	Higham Town reserves	32	12	5	15	50	56	−6	29	
11	Bedford Avenue	32	7	13	12	45	56	−11	27	
12	Towcester Town	32	9	7	16	48	54	−6	25	
13	Deanshanger Athletic	32	9	7	16	43	77	−34	25	Resigned from the league
14	Eynesbury Rovers reserves	32	7	10	15	36	44	−8	24	
15	Raunds Town reserves	32	7	6	19	29	83	−54	20	
16	Blisworth	32	7	4	21	29	60	−31	18	Resigned from the league
17	Woodford United	32	4	3	25	35	112	−77	11	Resigned from the league

Source: nonleaguematters
Rules for classification: 1) points; 2) goal ratio; 3) number of goals scored.
