= 1974–75 United Counties League =

The 1974–75 United Counties League season was the 68th in the history of the United Counties League, a football competition in England.

== Premier Division ==
United Counties League Premier Division
- Season: 1974–75
- Champions: Spalding United
- Relegated: Leighton Town
- Matches played: 342
- Goals scored: 995 (2.91 per match)

The Premier Division featured 17 clubs which competed in the division last season, along with two new clubs, joined from the Spartan League:

- Leighton Town
- Vauxhall Motors

=== League table ===
| Pos | Team | Pld | W | D | L | GF | GA | GD | Pts | Promotion or relegation |
|---|---|---|---|---|---|---|---|---|---|---|
| 1 | Spalding United | 36 | 26 | 8 | 2 | 86 | 23 | +63 | 60 | |
| 2 | Vauxhall Motors | 36 | 24 | 5 | 7 | 74 | 37 | +37 | 53 | |
| 3 | Stamford | 36 | 23 | 6 | 7 | 76 | 30 | +46 | 52 | |
| 4 | Kempston Rovers | 36 | 20 | 12 | 4 | 59 | 24 | +35 | 52 | |
| 5 | Irthlingborough Diamonds | 36 | 22 | 4 | 10 | 71 | 40 | +31 | 48 | |
| 6 | Long Buckby | 36 | 20 | 6 | 10 | 81 | 56 | +25 | 46 | |
| 7 | Biggleswade Town | 36 | 15 | 13 | 8 | 63 | 40 | +23 | 43 | |
| 8 | Rushden Town | 36 | 12 | 16 | 8 | 51 | 47 | +4 | 40 | |
| 9 | St Neots Town | 36 | 16 | 5 | 15 | 44 | 45 | −1 | 37 | |
| 10 | Ampthill Town | 36 | 11 | 14 | 11 | 55 | 47 | +8 | 36 | |
| 11 | Desborough Town | 36 | 11 | 7 | 18 | 43 | 52 | −9 | 29 | |
| 12 | Holbeach United | 36 | 10 | 9 | 17 | 46 | 61 | −15 | 29 | |
| 13 | Potton United | 36 | 10 | 9 | 17 | 38 | 56 | −18 | 29 | |
| 14 | Wootton Blue Cross | 36 | 8 | 11 | 17 | 24 | 60 | −36 | 27 | |
| 15 | Bourne Town | 36 | 8 | 8 | 20 | 42 | 78 | −36 | 24 | |
| 16 | Wolverton Town | 36 | 8 | 7 | 21 | 39 | 67 | −28 | 23 | |
| 17 | Rothwell Town | 36 | 9 | 4 | 23 | 38 | 80 | −42 | 22 | |
| 18 | Northampton Spencer | 36 | 8 | 5 | 23 | 39 | 74 | −35 | 21 | |
| 19 | Leighton Town | 36 | 1 | 11 | 24 | 26 | 78 | −52 | 13 | Relegated to Division One |

Source: nonleaguematters
Rules for classification: 1) points; 2) goal difference; 3) number of goals scored.

== Division One ==
United Counties League Division One
- Season: 1974–75
- Champions: Stewart & Lloyds Corby
- Promoted: Stewart & Lloyds Corby; Olney Town

The Division One featured 16 clubs which competed in the division last season, along with 2 new clubs, promoted from Division Two:

- Woodford United
- Irchester United

=== League table ===
| Pos | Team | Pld | W | D | L | GF | GA | GR | Pts | Promotion or relegation |
|---|---|---|---|---|---|---|---|---|---|---|
| 1 | Stewart & Lloyds Corby | 32 | 25 | 4 | 3 | 83 | 20 | 4.150 | 54 | Promoted to the Premier Division |
| 2 | Olney Town | 32 | 23 | 4 | 5 | 65 | 23 | 2.826 | 50 | Promoted to the Premier Division |
| 3 | V S Rugby | 32 | 18 | 9 | 5 | 80 | 32 | 2.500 | 45 | Transferred to the West Midlands (Regional) League |
| 4 | Woodford United | 32 | 16 | 8 | 8 | 56 | 47 | 1.191 | 40 | |
| 5 | Belsize | 32 | 15 | 7 | 10 | 55 | 46 | 1.196 | 37 | |
| 6 | Raunds Town | 32 | 16 | 5 | 11 | 58 | 52 | 1.115 | 37 | |
| 7 | Irthlingborough Diamonds reserves | 32 | 12 | 9 | 11 | 47 | 40 | 1.175 | 33 | |
| 8 | Irchester United | 32 | 13 | 7 | 12 | 50 | 39 | 1.282 | 33 | |
| 9 | Eynesbury Rovers | 32 | 10 | 9 | 13 | 41 | 49 | 0.837 | 29 | |
| 10 | Corby Gainsborough | 32 | 9 | 9 | 14 | 39 | 51 | 0.765 | 27 | |
| 11 | Burton Park Wanderers | 32 | 9 | 8 | 15 | 48 | 55 | 0.873 | 26 | |
| 12 | British Timken Athletic | 32 | 10 | 5 | 17 | 44 | 60 | 0.733 | 25 | |
| 13 | Higham Town | 32 | 9 | 7 | 16 | 37 | 58 | 0.638 | 25 | |
| 14 | Northampton ON Chenecks | 32 | 9 | 5 | 18 | 42 | 67 | 0.627 | 23 | |
| 15 | Desborough Town reserves | 32 | 7 | 9 | 16 | 40 | 67 | 0.597 | 23 | |
| 16 | Sharnbrook | 32 | 6 | 8 | 18 | 36 | 72 | 0.500 | 20 | |
| 17 | Rushden Town reserves | 32 | 6 | 5 | 21 | 32 | 75 | 0.427 | 17 | |
| 18 | Rothwell Town reserves | 0 | 0 | 0 | 0 | 0 | 0 | — | 0 | Club folded, record expunged |

Source: nonleaguematters
Rules for classification: 1) points; 2) goal ratio; 3) number of goals scored.

== Division Two ==
United Counties League Division Two
- Season: 1974–75
- Champions: Geddington Montrose
- Promoted: Geddington Montrose; Buckingham Town; Kempston Rovers reserves

The Division Two featured 16 clubs which competed in the division last season, along with 4 new clubs:

- British Timken Duston, relegated from Division One
- Buckingham Town, transferred from the South Midlands League
- Vauxhall Motors reserves
- Potton United reserves

=== League table ===
| Pos | Team | Pld | W | D | L | GF | GA | GR | Pts | Promotion or relegation |
|---|---|---|---|---|---|---|---|---|---|---|
| 1 | Geddington Montrose | 38 | 32 | 3 | 3 | 106 | 22 | 4.818 | 67 | Promoted to Division One |
| 2 | Buckingham Town | 38 | 29 | 4 | 5 | 150 | 32 | 4.688 | 62 | Promoted to Division One |
| 3 | Kempston Rovers reserves | 38 | 26 | 5 | 7 | 76 | 37 | 2.054 | 57 | Promoted to Division One |
| 4 | Vauxhall Motors reserves | 38 | 24 | 8 | 6 | 76 | 24 | 3.167 | 56 | |
| 5 | Stewart & Lloyds Corby reserves | 38 | 22 | 6 | 10 | 75 | 41 | 1.829 | 50 | |
| 6 | Newport Pagnell Town | 38 | 19 | 9 | 10 | 76 | 39 | 1.949 | 47 | |
| 7 | Ampthill Town reserves | 38 | 16 | 10 | 12 | 54 | 43 | 1.256 | 42 | |
| 8 | Bedford Avenue | 38 | 16 | 9 | 13 | 74 | 66 | 1.121 | 41 | |
| 9 | Potton United reserves | 38 | 10 | 15 | 13 | 55 | 69 | 0.797 | 35 | |
| 10 | Blisworth | 38 | 15 | 5 | 18 | 52 | 77 | 0.675 | 35 | |
| 11 | Wootton Blue Cross reserves | 38 | 11 | 11 | 16 | 46 | 54 | 0.852 | 33 | |
| 12 | Bedford United | 38 | 12 | 8 | 18 | 62 | 77 | 0.805 | 32 | |
| 13 | Northampton Spencer reserves | 38 | 13 | 6 | 19 | 53 | 74 | 0.716 | 32 | |
| 14 | Higham Town reserves | 38 | 13 | 5 | 20 | 66 | 73 | 0.904 | 31 | |
| 15 | Deanshanger Athletic | 38 | 10 | 9 | 19 | 56 | 78 | 0.718 | 29 | |
| 16 | Higham Rovers | 38 | 9 | 7 | 22 | 55 | 97 | 0.567 | 25 | |
| 17 | Long Buckby reserves | 38 | 10 | 4 | 24 | 49 | 90 | 0.544 | 24 | |
| 18 | British Timken Duston | 38 | 9 | 5 | 24 | 38 | 81 | 0.469 | 23 | |
| 19 | Raunds Town reserves | 38 | 7 | 8 | 23 | 50 | 114 | 0.439 | 22 | |
| 20 | Olney Town reserves | 38 | 5 | 7 | 26 | 36 | 117 | 0.308 | 17 | |

Source: nonleaguematters
Rules for classification: 1) points; 2) goal ratio; 3) number of goals scored.
