= 1973–74 United Counties League =

The 1973–74 United Counties League season was the 67th in the history of the United Counties League, a football competition in England.

== Premier Division ==
United Counties League Premier Division
- Season: 1973–74
- Champions: Kempston Rovers
- Matches played: 272
- Goals scored: 761 (2.8 per match)

The Premier Division featured 16 clubs which competed in the division last season, along with one new club:

- St Neots Town, transferred from the Eastern Counties League

=== League table ===
Pos	Team	Pld	W	D	L	GF	GA	GD	Pts
1	Kempston Rovers	32	24	7	1	72	16	+56	55
2	Holbeach United	32	16	11	5	52	26	+26	43
3	Stamford	32	17	6	9	74	55	+19	40
4	Spalding United	32	14	11	7	49	31	+18	39
5	St Neots Town	32	16	5	11	43	41	+2	37
6	Desborough Town	32	14	5	13	56	49	+7	33
7	Long Buckby	32	11	11	10	50	44	+6	33
8	Biggleswade Town	32	12	9	11	40	38	+2	33
9	Wolverton Town	32	9	13	10	38	46	−8	31
10	Rushden Town	32	11	8	13	49	49	0	30
11	Irthlingborough Diamonds	32	11	8	13	45	47	−2	30
12	Bourne Town	32	11	8	13	42	46	−4	30
13	Rothwell Town	32	12	6	14	28	32	−4	30
14	Ampthill Town	32	9	9	14	41	45	−4	27
15	Wootton Blue Cross	32	9	6	17	30	51	−21	24
16	Northampton Spencer	32	7	4	21	30	71	−41	18
17	Potton United	32	2	7	23	22	74	−52	11

Source: nonleaguematters
Rules for classification: 1) points; 2) goal difference; 3) number of goals scored.

== Division One ==
United Counties League Division One
- Season: 1973–74
- Champions: Stewart & Lloyds Corby
- Relegated: British Timken Duston

The Division One featured 18 clubs which competed in the division last season, along with 2 new clubs, promoted from Division Two:

- Belsize
- Northampton ON Chenecks

Also, Kettering Park Wanderers changed name to Burton Park Wanderers.

=== League table ===
Pos	Team	Pld	W	D	L	GF	GA	GR	Pts	Promotion or relegation
1	Stewart & Lloyds Corby	38	31	3	4	107	26	4.115	65	
2	British Timken Athletic	38	26	6	6	98	41	2.390	58	
3	Corby Gainsborough	38	21	8	9	66	33	2.000	50	
4	Bedford Eaglets	38	22	4	12	86	54	1.593	48	Resigned from the league
5	Rushden Town reserves	38	20	8	10	78	53	1.472	48	
6	Desborough Town reserves	38	19	10	9	71	54	1.315	48	
7	Northampton ON Chenecks	38	18	8	12	81	58	1.397	44	
8	Burton Park Wanderers	38	16	11	11	68	55	1.236	43	
9	Olney Town	38	17	7	14	68	56	1.214	41	
10	V S Rugby	38	16	9	13	65	56	1.161	41	
11	Sharnbrook	38	15	7	16	76	76	1.000	37	
12	Raunds Town	38	14	9	15	61	65	0.938	37	
13	Irthlingborough Diamonds reserves	38	13	10	15	62	61	1.016	36	
14	Higham Town	38	14	8	16	63	71	0.887	36	
15	Belsize	38	11	11	16	65	47	1.383	33	
16	Eynesbury Rovers	38	12	7	19	50	82	0.610	31	
17	Biggleswade Town reserves	38	8	7	23	49	100	0.490	23	Resigned from the league
18	Rothwell Town reserves	38	5	5	28	37	90	0.411	15	
19	St Neots Town reserves	38	5	4	29	38	112	0.339	14	Resigned from the league
20	British Timken Duston	38	3	6	29	31	130	0.238	12	Relegated to Division Two

Source: nonleaguematters
Rules for classification: 1) points; 2) goal ratio; 3) number of goals scored.

== Division Two ==
United Counties League Division Two
- Season: 1973–74
- Champions: Woodford United
- Promoted: Woodford United; Irchester United

The Division Two featured 16 clubs which competed the division last season, along with 3 new clubs:

- Newport Pagnell Town, transferred from the South Midlands League
- Long Buckby reserves
- Northampton Spencer reserves

=== League table ===
Pos	Team	Pld	W	D	L	GF	GA	GR	Pts	Promotion or relegation
1	Woodford United	36	30	5	1	93	22	4.227	65	Promoted to Division One
2	Irchester United	36	28	6	2	105	41	2.561	62	Promoted to Division One
3	Geddington Montrose	36	20	10	6	86	46	1.870	50	
4	Ampthill Town reserves	36	18	9	9	87	44	1.977	45	
5	Stewart & Lloyds Corby reserves	36	17	9	10	63	47	1.340	43	
6	Bedford United	36	13	10	13	66	66	1.000	36	
7	Newport Pagnell Town	36	14	7	15	57	50	1.140	35	
8	Bedford Avenue	36	12	11	13	73	71	1.028	35	
9	Raunds Town reserves	36	13	9	14	77	85	0.906	35	
10	Wootton Blue Cross reserves	36	11	12	13	64	57	1.123	34	
11	Blisworth	36	13	8	15	59	69	0.855	34	
12	Long Buckby reserves	36	13	7	16	79	84	0.940	33	
13	Kempston Rovers reserves	36	11	10	15	63	65	0.969	32	
14	Higham Town reserves	36	10	11	15	71	71	1.000	31	
15	Northampton Spencer reserves	36	14	3	19	63	78	0.808	31	
16	Deanshanger Athletic	36	12	4	20	73	108	0.676	28	
17	Olney Town reserves	36	9	6	21	36	80	0.450	24	
18	Higham Rovers	36	8	7	21	44	84	0.524	23	
19	British Timken Duston reserves	36	3	2	31	31	122	0.254	8	Resigned from the league

Source: nonleaguematters
Rules for classification: 1) points; 2) goal ratio; 3) number of goals scored.
