= 1998–99 United Counties League =

The 1998–99 United Counties League season was the 92nd in the history of the United Counties League, a football competition in England.

== Premier Division ==
United Counties League Premier Division
- Season: 1998–99
- Champions: Spalding United
- Promoted: Spalding United
- Matches: 380
- Goals: 1,270 (3.34 per match)

The Premier Division featured 20 clubs which competed in the division last season, no new clubs joined the division this season.

Also, Mirrlees Blackstone changed name to Blackstones.

=== League table ===
Pos	Team	Pld	W	D	L	GF	GA	GD	Pts	Promotion or relegation
1	Spalding United	38	30	3	5	106	29	+77	93	Promoted to the Southern Football League
2	Desborough Town	38	24	6	8	82	41	+41	78	
3	Cogenhoe United	38	23	5	10	89	47	+42	74	
4	Northampton Spencer	38	20	6	12	78	46	+32	66	
5	Stewarts & Lloyds Corby	38	19	9	10	70	45	+25	66	
6	Bourne Town	38	18	9	11	75	69	+6	63	
7	Stotfold	38	17	11	10	57	43	+14	62	
8	Boston Town	38	17	10	11	68	44	+24	61	
9	Buckingham Town	38	17	9	12	71	52	+19	60	
10	Yaxley	38	18	5	15	87	75	+12	59	
11	Wellingborough Town	38	16	6	16	57	57	0	54	
12	Blackstones	38	16	5	17	59	56	+3	53	
13	St. Neots Town	38	15	6	17	70	73	−3	51	
14	Wootton Blue Cross	38	13	8	17	54	77	−23	47	
15	Holbeach United	38	12	10	16	62	65	−3	46	
16	Ford Sports Daventry	38	12	9	17	50	57	−7	45	
17	Kempston Rovers	38	10	6	22	46	75	−29	36	
18	Eynesbury Rovers	38	6	7	25	42	100	−58	25	
19	Long Buckby	38	3	6	29	26	99	−73	15	
20	Potton United	38	2	8	28	21	120	−99	14	

Source: fchd
Rules for classification: 1) points; 2) goal difference; 3) number of goals scored.

== Division One ==
United Counties League Division One
- Season: 1998–99
- Champions: Bugbrooke St Michaels
- Promoted: Bugbrooke St Michaels
- Matches: 306
- Goals: 1,107 (3.62 per match)

Division One featured 17 clubs which competed in the division last season, along with one new club:

- Woodford United, joined from the Northamptonshire Combination League

=== League table ===
Pos	Team	Pld	W	D	L	GF	GA	GD	Pts	Promotion
1	Bugbrooke St Michaels	34	24	6	4	104	29	+75	78	Promoted to the Premier Division
2	Higham Town	34	23	6	5	101	28	+73	75	
3	Rothwell Corinthians	34	18	10	6	78	52	+26	64	
4	Wellingborough Whitworth	34	19	6	9	73	43	+30	63	
5	Cottingham	34	18	9	7	80	51	+29	63	
6	Northampton Vanaid	34	17	10	7	51	26	+25	61	
7	Blisworth	34	15	10	9	69	53	+16	55	
8	Thrapston Town	34	14	8	12	66	63	+3	50	
9	Newport Pagnell Town	34	14	7	13	78	79	−1	49	
10	Daventry Town	34	14	4	16	56	55	+1	46	
11	Northampton ON Chenecks	34	13	6	15	52	61	−9	45	
12	Olney Town	34	11	8	15	56	49	+7	41	
13	Woodford United	34	10	9	15	56	74	−18	39	
14	St Ives Town	34	7	12	15	31	62	−31	33	
15	Irchester United	34	9	4	21	44	96	−52	31	
16	Sharnbrook	34	5	8	21	35	94	−59	23	
17	Harrowby United	34	5	4	25	49	105	−56	19	
18	Burton Park Wanderers	34	3	7	24	28	87	−59	16	

Source: fchd
Rules for classification: 1) points; 2) goal difference; 3) number of goals scored.
