= 2000–01 United Counties League =

The 2000–01 United Counties League season was the 94th in the history of the United Counties League, a football competition in England.

== Premier Division ==
United Counties League Premier Division
- Season: 2000–01
- Champions: Boston Town
- Relegated: Potton United; Eynesbury Rovers
- Matches: 420
- Goals: 1,510 (3.6 per match)

The Premier Division featured 20 clubs which competed in the division last season, along with one new club:

- Raunds Town, resigned from the Southern Football League

=== League table ===
Pos	Team	Pld	W	D	L	GF	GA	GD	Pts	Promotion or relegation
1	Boston Town	40	26	8	6	89	46	+43	86	
2	Cogenhoe United	40	27	4	9	97	51	+46	85	
3	Raunds Town	40	25	4	11	100	48	+52	79	
4	Ford Sports Daventry	40	24	4	12	78	61	+17	76	
5	St. Neots Town	40	22	9	9	97	56	+41	75	
6	Wootton Blue Cross	40	21	12	7	85	48	+37	75	
7	Desborough Town	40	19	10	11	72	48	+24	67	
8	Northampton Spencer	40	19	7	14	76	60	+16	64	
9	Kempston Rovers	40	16	13	11	68	52	+16	61	
10	Yaxley	40	18	7	15	69	58	+11	61	
11	Stewarts & Lloyds Corby	40	17	9	14	64	56	+8	60	
12	Blackstones	40	15	10	15	93	71	+22	55	
13	Bourne Town	40	15	9	16	72	84	−12	54	
14	Holbeach United	40	15	8	17	69	65	+4	53	
15	Stotfold	40	12	10	18	74	66	+8	46	
16	Bugbrooke St Michaels	40	9	15	16	43	63	−20	42	
17	Buckingham Town	40	10	9	21	72	108	−36	39	
18	Wellingborough Town	40	8	9	23	57	90	−33	33	
19	Long Buckby	40	6	6	28	57	150	−93	24	
20	Potton United	40	4	7	29	38	111	−73	19	Relegated to Division One
21	Eynesbury Rovers	40	4	6	30	40	118	−78	18	Relegated to Division One

Source: fchd
Rules for classification: 1) points; 2) goal difference; 3) number of goals scored.

== Division One ==
United Counties League Division One
- Season: 2000–01
- Champions: Daventry Town
- Promoted: Daventry Town; Deeping Rangers
- Matches: 306
- Goals: 1,102 (3.6 per match)

Division One featured 18 clubs which competed in the division last season, no new clubs joined the division this season.

Northampton Vanaid changed name to Northampton Sileby Rangers.

=== League table ===
Pos	Team	Pld	W	D	L	GF	GA	GD	Pts	Promotion
1	Daventry Town	34	23	6	5	104	30	+74	75	Promoted to the Premier Division
2	Deeping Rangers	34	22	9	3	82	30	+52	75	Promoted to the Premier Division
3	Blisworth	34	21	7	6	71	43	+28	70	
4	Thrapston Town	34	20	9	5	92	44	+48	69	
5	Cottingham	34	18	9	7	70	43	+27	63	
6	Rothwell Corinthians	34	14	10	10	54	44	+10	52	
7	Newport Pagnell Town	34	15	5	14	79	64	+15	50	
8	Harrowby United	34	12	11	11	56	44	+12	47	
9	Woodford United	34	13	8	13	70	61	+9	47	
10	Wellingborough Whitworth	34	11	10	13	60	68	−8	43	
11	Northampton ON Chenecks	34	11	8	15	65	71	−6	41	
12	Higham Town	34	9	12	13	40	49	−9	39	
13	St Ives Town	34	8	14	12	51	59	−8	38	
14	Burton Park Wanderers	34	9	8	17	53	68	−15	35	
15	Northampton Sileby Rangers	34	6	11	17	52	70	−18	29	
16	Olney Town	34	8	5	21	41	61	−20	29	
17	Irchester United	34	5	8	21	30	86	−56	23	
18	Sharnbrook	34	4	4	26	32	167	−135	16	Resigned from the league

Source: fchd
Rules for classification: 1) points; 2) goal difference; 3) number of goals scored.
