= 1978–79 United Counties League =

The 1978–79 United Counties League season was the 72nd in the history of the United Counties League, a football competition in England.

== Premier Division ==
United Counties League Premier Division
- Season: 1978–79
- Champions: Irthlingborough Diamonds
- Matches played: 342
- Goals scored: 1,062 (3.11 per match)

The Premier Division featured 19 clubs which competed in the division last season, no new clubs joined the division this season.

=== League table ===
| Pos | Team | Pld | W | D | L | GF | GA | GD | Pts |
|---|---|---|---|---|---|---|---|---|---|
| 1 | Irthlingborough Diamonds | 36 | 25 | 5 | 6 | 88 | 31 | +57 | 55 |
| 2 | Rushden Town | 36 | 22 | 7 | 7 | 72 | 29 | +43 | 51 |
| 3 | Kempston Rovers | 36 | 20 | 7 | 9 | 55 | 23 | +32 | 47 |
| 4 | Desborough Town | 36 | 20 | 3 | 13 | 82 | 59 | +23 | 43 |
| 5 | Potton United | 36 | 18 | 7 | 11 | 59 | 49 | +10 | 43 |
| 6 | Wolverton Town | 36 | 17 | 9 | 10 | 61 | 52 | +9 | 43 |
| 7 | Rothwell Town | 36 | 14 | 12 | 10 | 56 | 50 | +6 | 40 |
| 8 | Stamford | 36 | 15 | 9 | 12 | 61 | 47 | +14 | 39 |
| 9 | St Neots Town | 36 | 16 | 7 | 13 | 59 | 51 | +8 | 39 |
| 10 | Wootton Blue Cross | 36 | 15 | 8 | 13 | 77 | 63 | +14 | 38 |
| 11 | Stewart & Lloyds Corby | 36 | 16 | 5 | 15 | 48 | 46 | +2 | 37 |
| 12 | Olney Town | 36 | 14 | 9 | 13 | 36 | 43 | −7 | 37 |
| 13 | Buckingham Town | 36 | 10 | 11 | 15 | 46 | 52 | −6 | 31 |
| 14 | Long Buckby | 36 | 12 | 6 | 18 | 41 | 58 | −17 | 30 |
| 15 | Ampthill Town | 36 | 10 | 5 | 21 | 44 | 74 | −30 | 25 |
| 16 | Bourne Town | 36 | 9 | 6 | 21 | 51 | 86 | −35 | 24 |
| 17 | Northampton Spencer | 36 | 7 | 9 | 20 | 47 | 76 | −29 | 23 |
| 18 | Holbeach United | 36 | 9 | 4 | 23 | 51 | 94 | −43 | 22 |
| 19 | Eynesbury Rovers | 36 | 6 | 5 | 25 | 28 | 79 | −51 | 17 |

Source: nonleaguematters
Rules for classification: 1) points; 2) goal difference; 3) number of goals scored.

== Division One ==
United Counties League Division One
- Season: 1978–79
- Champions: Milton Keynes Borough
- Relegated: Raunds Town

The Division One featured 18 clubs which competed in the division last season, along with 2 new clubs, promoted from Division Two:

- Northampton Spencer reserves
- Ampthill Town reserves

=== League table ===
| Pos | Team | Pld | W | D | L | GF | GA | GD | Pts | Promotion or relegation |
|---|---|---|---|---|---|---|---|---|---|---|
| 1 | Milton Keynes Borough | 38 | 31 | 4 | 3 | 105 | 28 | +77 | 66 | Transferred to the Hellenic League |
| 2 | Northampton ON Chenecks | 38 | 29 | 4 | 5 | 94 | 35 | +59 | 62 | |
| 3 | Vauxhall Motors | 38 | 24 | 8 | 6 | 66 | 25 | +41 | 56 | Transferred to the South Midlands League |
| 4 | Geddington Montrose | 38 | 23 | 8 | 7 | 65 | 28 | +37 | 54 | |
| 5 | Corby Gainsborough | 38 | 17 | 7 | 14 | 56 | 41 | +15 | 41 | |
| 6 | Stewart & Lloyds Corby reserves | 38 | 15 | 10 | 13 | 58 | 61 | −3 | 40 | |
| 7 | Newport Pagnell Town | 38 | 13 | 12 | 13 | 63 | 65 | −2 | 38 | |
| 8 | Kempston Rovers reserves | 38 | 17 | 3 | 18 | 54 | 64 | −10 | 37 | |
| 9 | Higham Town | 38 | 13 | 10 | 15 | 59 | 54 | +5 | 36 | |
| 10 | Rushden Town reserves | 38 | 14 | 6 | 18 | 53 | 77 | −24 | 34 | |
| 11 | Biggleswade Town | 38 | 13 | 7 | 18 | 32 | 52 | −20 | 33 | |
| 12 | Irthlingborough Diamonds reserves | 38 | 12 | 8 | 18 | 64 | 62 | +2 | 32 | |
| 13 | Irchester United | 38 | 12 | 8 | 18 | 56 | 58 | −2 | 32 | |
| 14 | Northampton Spencer reserves | 38 | 13 | 6 | 19 | 55 | 64 | −9 | 32 | |
| 15 | British Timken Athletic | 38 | 12 | 7 | 19 | 53 | 66 | −13 | 31 | |
| 16 | Ampthill Town reserves | 38 | 12 | 7 | 19 | 47 | 72 | −25 | 31 | |
| 17 | Desborough Town reserves | 38 | 12 | 6 | 20 | 51 | 72 | −21 | 30 | |
| 18 | Wootton Blue Cross reserves | 38 | 8 | 11 | 19 | 49 | 67 | −18 | 27 | |
| 19 | Byfield Athletic | 38 | 9 | 9 | 20 | 37 | 73 | −36 | 27 | Resigned from the league |
| 20 | Raunds Town | 38 | 8 | 5 | 25 | 47 | 100 | −53 | 21 | Relegated to Division Two |

Source: nonleaguematters
Rules for classification: 1) points; 2) goal ratio; 3) number of goals scored.

== Division Two ==
United Counties League Division Two
- Season: 1978–79
- Champions: British Timken Duston
- Promoted: British Timken Duston; Ford Sports Daventry

The Division Two featured 12 clubs which competed in the division last season, along with 4 new clubs:

- Burton Park Wanderers, relegated from Division One
- Sharnbrook, relegated from Division One
- Thrapston Venturas
- Rothwell Town reserves

=== League table ===
| Pos | Team | Pld | W | D | L | GF | GA | GD | Pts | Promotion or relegation |
|---|---|---|---|---|---|---|---|---|---|---|
| 1 | British Timken Duston | 30 | 22 | 6 | 2 | 78 | 20 | +58 | 50 | Promoted to Division One |
| 2 | Ford Sports Daventry | 30 | 20 | 5 | 5 | 60 | 27 | +33 | 45 | Promoted to Division One |
| 3 | Sharnbrook | 30 | 20 | 2 | 8 | 76 | 29 | +47 | 42 | |
| 4 | Olney Town reserves | 30 | 16 | 4 | 10 | 50 | 31 | +19 | 36 | |
| 5 | Higham Town reserves | 30 | 14 | 6 | 10 | 52 | 48 | +4 | 34 | |
| 6 | Long Buckby reserves | 30 | 14 | 6 | 10 | 44 | 45 | −1 | 34 | |
| 7 | Thrapston Venturas | 30 | 13 | 7 | 10 | 48 | 35 | +13 | 33 | |
| 8 | Rothwell Town reserves | 30 | 12 | 7 | 11 | 48 | 39 | +9 | 31 | |
| 9 | Burton Park Wanderers | 30 | 14 | 3 | 13 | 53 | 48 | +5 | 31 | |
| 10 | Eynesbury Rovers reserves | 30 | 13 | 4 | 13 | 47 | 42 | +5 | 30 | |
| 11 | St Neots Town reserves | 30 | 12 | 6 | 12 | 38 | 40 | −2 | 30 | |
| 12 | Wolverton Town reserves | 30 | 10 | 6 | 14 | 36 | 48 | −12 | 26 | |
| 13 | Towcester Town | 30 | 9 | 5 | 16 | 37 | 48 | −11 | 23 | |
| 14 | Bedford Avenue | 30 | 8 | 3 | 19 | 30 | 67 | −37 | 19 | |
| 15 | Bedford United | 30 | 2 | 8 | 20 | 31 | 70 | −39 | 12 | Resigned from the league |
| 16 | Raunds Town reserves | 30 | 1 | 2 | 27 | 19 | 110 | −91 | 4 | Resigned from the league |

Source: nonleaguematters
Rules for classification: 1) points; 2) goal ratio; 3) number of goals scored.
