= 2005–06 United Counties League =

The 2005–06 United Counties League season was the 99th in the history of the United Counties League, a football competition in England.

== Premier Division ==
United Counties League Premier Division
- Season: 2005–06
- Champions: Woodford United
- Promoted: Woodford United
- Matches: 462
- Goals: 1,562 (3.38 per match)

The Premier Division featured 21 clubs which competed in the division last season, along with one new club:

- St Ives Town, promoted from Division One

=== League table ===
Pos	Team	Pld	W	D	L	GF	GA	GD	Pts	Promotion or relegation
1	Woodford United	42	28	8	6	102	32	+70	92	Promoted to the Southern Football League
2	Potton United	42	28	8	6	92	51	+41	92	
3	Northampton Spencer	42	28	5	9	92	36	+56	89	
4	St. Neots Town	42	25	5	12	81	52	+29	80	
5	Cogenhoe United	42	23	8	11	86	64	+22	77	
6	Boston Town	42	22	9	11	88	60	+28	75	
7	Yaxley	42	21	6	15	71	49	+22	66 (Note: Yaxley were deducted three points.)	
8	Raunds Town	42	18	11	13	66	54	+12	65	
9	St Ives Town	42	18	4	20	64	76	−12	58	
10	Blackstones	42	15	12	15	79	68	+11	57	
11	Stotfold	42	15	10	17	84	74	+10	55	
12	Wootton Blue Cross	42	15	9	18	65	59	+6	54	
13	Bourne Town	42	15	9	18	68	73	−5	54	
14	Buckingham Town	42	15	7	20	77	84	−7	51 (Note: Buckingham Town were deducted one point.)	
15	Newport Pagnell Town	42	14	8	20	48	66	−18	50	
16	Stewarts & Lloyds Corby	42	14	8	20	55	77	−22	50	
17	Holbeach United	42	12	10	20	63	70	−7	46	
18	Desborough Town	42	13	8	21	64	83	−19	46 (Note: Desborough Town were deducted one point.)	
19	Ford Sports Daventry	42	13	6	23	59	84	−25	45	
20	Deeping Rangers	42	11	9	22	56	73	−17	42	
21	Long Buckby	42	11	7	24	65	87	−22	40	
22	Harrowby United	42	2	5	35	37	190	−153	11	Resigned to the Grantham & District League

Source: fchd
Rules for classification: 1) points; 2) goal difference; 3) number of goals scored.

== Division One ==
United Counties League Division One
- Season: 2005–06
- Champions: Sleaford Town
- Promoted: Wellingborough Town
- Matches: 306
- Goals: 1,086 (3.55 per match)

Division One featured 16 clubs which competed in the division last season, along with two new clubs:

- Daventry Town, relegated from the Premier Division
- Wellingborough Town, joined from the Northamptonshire Senior Youth League

Also, Eye United changed name to Peterborough Northern Star.

=== League table ===
Pos	Team	Pld	W	D	L	GF	GA	GD	Pts	Promotion
1	Sleaford Town	34	26	3	5	106	36	+70	81	
2	Wellingborough Town	34	22	11	1	74	19	+55	77	Promoted to the Premier Division
3	Wellingborough Whitworth	34	21	5	8	77	38	+39	68	
4	Kempston Rovers	34	19	7	8	61	38	+23	64	
5	Northampton ON Chenecks	34	19	5	10	66	43	+23	62	
6	Daventry Town	34	14	9	11	67	58	+9	51	
7	Eynesbury Rovers	34	15	5	14	63	68	−5	50	
8	Olney Town	34	14	6	14	69	59	+10	48	
9	Peterborough Northern Star	34	13	9	12	71	63	+8	48	
10	Rothwell Corinthians	34	13	7	14	59	57	+2	46	
11	Bugbrooke St Michaels	34	12	7	15	45	65	−20	43	
12	Huntingdon Town	34	12	5	17	45	53	−8	41	
13	Northampton Sileby Rangers	34	12	4	18	59	81	−22	40	
14	Blisworth	34	10	10	14	63	71	−8	39 (Note: Blisworth were deducted one point.)	Resigned to the Northamptonshire Combination
15	Irchester United	34	11	4	19	48	65	−17	37	
16	Thrapston Town	34	7	7	20	52	79	−27	28	
17	Higham Town	34	6	4	24	35	105	−70	22	
18	Burton Park Wanderers	34	3	6	25	26	88	−62	15	

Source: fchd
Rules for classification: 1) points; 2) goal difference; 3) number of goals scored.
