= 2002–03 FA Cup qualifying rounds =

Tournament details
- Country: England; Wales

The 2002–03 FA Cup qualifying rounds opened the 122nd season of competition in England for 'The Football Association Challenge Cup' (FA Cup), the world's oldest association football single knockout competition. A total of 624 clubs were accepted for the competition, up 28 from the previous season’s 596.

The large number of clubs entering the tournament from lower down (levels 5 through 10) in the English football pyramid meant that the competition started with six rounds of preliminary (2) and qualifying (4) knockouts for these non-League teams. South Western Football League was the only level 10 league represented in the Cup, three clubs from the South Western Football League were the lowest-ranked clubs in competition. The 32 winning teams from fourth round qualifying progressed to the First round proper, where League teams tiered at levels 3 and 4 entered the competition.

== Calendar ==
Round	Start date	Leagues entering at this round	New entries this round	Winners from previous round	Number of fixtures
Extra preliminary round	17 August 2002	Levels 8-10	90	none	45
Preliminary round	31 August 2002	Level 7	351	45	198
First qualifying round	14 September 2002	none	none	198	99
Second qualifying round	28 September 2002	Isthmian League; Northern Premier League; Southern Football League (Premier divisions)	69	99	84
Third qualifying round	12 October 2002	none	none	84	42
Fourth qualifying round	26 October 2002	Football Conference	22	42	32

== Extra preliminary round ==
Matches played on Saturday 17 August 2002. 90 clubs from level 8 and level 9 of English football, entered at this stage of the competition, while other 237 clubs from levels 8–10 get a bye to the preliminary round.

Tie	Home team (tier)	Score	Away team (tier)
1	Bedford United & Valerio (8)	0–1	Brook House (8)
2	Deal Town (8)	2–2	Chichester City United (8)
replay	Chichester City United (8)	2–3	Deal Town (8)
3	Dereham Town (8)	1–3	AFC Wallingford (8)
4	Alton Town (8)	1–1	Didcot Town (8)
replay	Didcot Town (8)	1–0	Alton Town (8)
5	Bridgnorth Town (8)	4–2	Gedling Town (9)
6	Flixton (8)	1–1	Goole (8)
replay	Goole (8)	0–0 (5–4 p)	Flixton (8)
7	Greenwich Borough (8)	1–4	Three Bridges (8)
8	Highworth Town (8)	2–2	Fairford Town (8)
replay	Fairford Town (8)	1–4	Highworth Town (8)
9	Holker Old Boys (9)	0–2	Bridlington Town (8)
10	Horden Colliery Welfare (9)	2–1	Armthorpe Welfare (8)
11	Horsham YMCA (8)	1–3	Eastleigh (8)
12	Ilford (9)	3–0	Kempston Rovers (8)
13	Littlehampton Town (8)	0–6	Godalming & Guildford (8)
14	Lymington & New Milton (8)	2–2	East Preston (8)
replay	East Preston (8)	1–2	Lymington & New Milton (8)
15	Maltby Main (9)	0–6	Billingham Synthonia (8)
16	Bishop Sutton (8)	2–1	Melksham Town (8)
17	Moneyfields (8)	1–0	Burgess Hill Town (8)
18	Morpeth Town (8)	3–2	Curzon Ashton (8)
19	Leek CSOB (9)	0–3	Nantwich Town (8)
20	Newmarket Town (8)	2–3	Ely City (8)
Ely City disqualified for fielding ineligible player
21	Chester-le-Street Town (8)	3–1	Northallerton Town (9)

Tie	Home team (tier)	Score	Away team (tier)
22	Nelson (9)	0–0	Norton & Stockton Ancients (9)
replay	Norton & Stockton Ancients (9)	1–2	Nelson (9)
23	Paulton Rovers (8)	5–1	Downton (8)
24	Penrith (9)	3–2	Brandon United (8)
25	Consett (8)	4–1	Pontefract Collieries (9)
26	Potters Bar Town (8)	1–2	Milton Keynes City (8)
27	Ramsgate (8)	1–1	Maidstone United (8)
replay	Maidstone United (8)	1–0	Ramsgate (8)
28	Reading Town (8)	3–1	Farnham Town (8)
29	Chessington United (8)	0–1	Ringmer (8)
30	Raunds Town (8)	1–0	Ruislip Manor (8)
31	Saffron Walden Town (9)	0–1	Hullbridge Sports (9)
32	Marske United (8)	1–4	Salford City (8)
33	Sawbridgeworth Town (9)	2–0	Harwich & Parkeston (8)
34	Mickleover Sports (9)	3–1	Shirebrook Town (9)
35	AFC Totton (8)	3–2	Southwick (8)
36	Grosvenor Park (8)	2–0	Stafford Town (8)
37	Stotfold (8)	0–0	Broxbourne Borough V&E (8)
replay	Broxbourne Borough V&E (8)	1–5	Stotfold (8)
38	Stratford Town (8)	4–1	Stourbridge (8)
39	Street (9)	3–1	Keynsham Town (8)
40	Ramsbottom United (8)	1–0	Thackley (8)
41	Tiptree United (8)	1–1	Ipswich Wanderers (8)
replay	Ipswich Wanderers (8)	3–3 (7–6 p)	Tiptree United (8)
42	Portland United (8)	6–2	Welton Rovers (8)
43	Walton Casuals (8)	0–4	Whitehawk (8)
44	Christchurch (8)	3–0	Willand Rovers (9)
45	West Auckland Town (8)	2–1	Winsford United (8)

== Preliminary round ==
Matches played on weekend of Saturday 31 August 2002. A total of 396 clubs took part in this stage of the competition, including the 45 winners from the extra preliminary round, 237 clubs from levels 8–10, who get a bye in the extra preliminary round and 114 entering at this stage from the five divisions at level 7 of English football. The round featured three clubs from level 10 (all from the South Western Football League) in the competition, being the lowest ranked clubs in this round. Also, Gretna, who switched to the Scottish league system were excluded from the FA Cup.

Tie	Home team (tier)	Score	Away team (tier)
1	Abbey Hey (8)	0–0	Bamber Bridge (7)
replay	Bamber Bridge (7)	2–2 (2–4 p)	Abbey Hey (8)
2	Banbury United (7)	1–1	Berkhamsted Town (7)
replay	Berkhamsted Town (7)	1–4	Banbury United (7)
3	Bowers United (9)	1–4	Arlesey Town (7)
4	Brentwood (9)	2–2	AFC Wallingford (8)
replay	AFC Wallingford (8)	4–1	Brentwood (9)
5	Biddulph Victoria (8)	2–0	Bridgnorth Town (8)
6	Bournemouth (8)	3–0	Bridgwater Town (8)
7	Bacup Borough (9)	1–2	Bridlington Town (8)
8	Bedlington Terriers (8)	3–0	Brodsworth Miners Welfare (8)
9	Bromley (7)	3–2	Abingdon Town (8)
10	Barwell (8)	1–1	Bromsgrove Rovers (7)
replay	Bromsgrove Rovers (7)	4–3	Barwell (8)
11	Brook House (8)	2–3	Burnham (7)
12	Bury Town (8)	2–3	Barton Rovers (7)
13	Ashford Town (Kent) (7)	1–3	Carshalton Athletic (7)
14	Bedworth United (7)	1–1	Causeway United (8)
replay	Causeway United (8)	1–2	Bedworth United (7)
15	Chertsey Town (7)	4–1	Arundel (8)
16	Bishop Sutton (8)	1–3	Cinderford Town (7)
17	Clapton (8)	0–3	Beaconsfield SYCOB (8)
18	Clevedon Town (7)	2–2	Bitton (9)
replay	Bitton (9)	1–2	Clevedon Town (7)
19	Ashington (9)	1–0	Colne (9)
20	Camberley Town (8)	0–1	Cove (8)
21	Alnwick Town (9)	1–2	Crook Town (9)
22	Beckenham Town (8)	1–2	Croydon (7)
23	Dartford (7)	2–2	Carterton Town (8)
replay	Carterton Town (8)	1–0	Dartford (7)
24	Three Bridges (8)	3–1	Didcot Town (8)
25	Cogenhoe United (8)	0–2	Diss Town (8)
26	Croydon Athletic (7)	0–0	Eastbourne Borough (7)
replay	Eastbourne Borough (7)	4–1	Croydon Athletic (7)
27	Eastbourne United (9)	0–3	Cobham (8)
28	Bourne Town (8)	1–1	Eastwood Town (7)
replay	Eastwood Town (7)	3–1	Bourne Town (8)
29	Darwen (9)	1–3	Eccleshill United (8)
30	Chatham Town (7)	0–0	Egham Town (7)
replay	Egham Town (7)	0–1	Chatham Town (7)
31	Elmore (8)	1–2	Backwell United (8)
32	Corinthian-Casuals (7)	1–1	Epsom & Ewell (7)
replay	Epsom & Ewell (7)	1–2	Corinthian-Casuals (7)
33	Eastleigh (8)	5–0	Erith & Belvedere (7)
34	Evenwood Town (9)	1–4	Durham City (8)
35	Brislington (8)	2–2	Evesham United (7)
replay	Evesham United (7)	3–2	Brislington (8)
36	Falmouth Town (10)	2–0	Bristol Manor Farm (9)
37	Brockenhurst (8)	3–2	Fleet Town (7)
38	Glossop North End (8)	1–0	Boldmere St Michaels (8)
39	Belper Town (7)	0–1	Gresley Rovers (7)
40	Billingham Town (8)	w/o	Gretna (-)
Walkover for Billingham Town – Gretna removed after being granted entry into the Scottish League, allowing them to compete in the Scottish Cup
41	Guisborough Town (8)	2–0	Blackpool Mechanics (9)
42	AFC Newbury (8)	2–1	Hailsham Town (8)
43	Chester-le-Street Town (8)	2–0	Hall Road Rangers (9)
44	Hanwell Town (8)	0–3	Great Wakering Rovers (7)
45	East Thurrock United (7)	1–2	Harefield United (8)
46	Harlow Town (7)	0–1	Aveley (7)
47	Easington Colliery (9)	1–3	Hebburn Town (9)
48	Chalfont St Peter (8)	0–3	Hemel Hempstead Town (7)
49	Concord Rangers (9)	2–3	Hertford Town (7)
50	Highworth Town (8)	3–0	Cirencester Town (7)
51	Hillingdon Borough (8)	2–2	Chessington & Hook United (8)
replay	Chessington & Hook United (8)	1–3	Hillingdon Borough (8)
52	Hoddesdon Town (8)	0–2	AFC Sudbury (8)
53	Great Yarmouth Town (8)	2–1	Holmer Green (8)
54	Hullbridge Sports (9)	2–5	Edgware Town (8)
55	Deal Town (8)	4–2	Hythe Town (8)
56	Devizes Town (8)	5–2	Ilfracombe Town (9)
57	Glasshoughton Welfare (8)	1–3	Jarrow Roofing BCA (8)
58	Brigg Town (8)	2–4	Kendal Town (7)
59	Kidsgrove Athletic (7)	4–1	Buxton (8)
60	King's Lynn (7)	1–0	Deeping Rangers (8)
61	Banstead Athletic (7)	1–4	Leatherhead (7)
62	Ipswich Wanderers (8)	2–3	Leyton Pennant (7)
63	Chorley (7)	5–0	Liversedge (8)
64	Horsham (7)	2–2	Lordswood (8)
replay	Lordswood (8)	1–2	Horsham (7)
65	Louth United (9)	4–1	Cheadle Town (9)
66	Lymington & New Milton (8)	1–1	Dulwich Hamlet (7)
replay	Dulwich Hamlet (7)	1–3	Lymington & New Milton (8)
67	Maine Road (9)	1–2	Guiseley (7)
68	Maldon Town (8)	1–1	Flackwell Heath (8)
replay	Flackwell Heath (8)	1–0	Maldon Town (8)
69	Bashley (7)	2–2	Mangotsfield United (7)
replay	Mangotsfield United (7)	0–1	Bashley (7)
70	Long Buckby (8)	0–2	Marlow (7)
71	Merthyr Tydfil (7)	3–0	Christchurch (8)
72	Metropolitan Police (7)	4–0	Lancing (9)
73	Mickleover Sports (9)	2–1	Cradley Town (8)
74	Mildenhall Town (8)	0–0	London Colney (8)
replay	London Colney (8)	1–0	Mildenhall Town (8)
75	Minehead Town (9)	0–2	Gloucester City (7)
76	Molesey (7)	3–0	Hassocks (8)
77	Moneyfields (8)	0–2	BAT Sports (8)
78	Goole (8)	0–3	Mossley (8)
79	North Leigh (8)	0–5	Cowes Sports (8)
80	Nantwich Town (8)	4–0	Holbeach United (8)
81	Nelson (9)	2–3	Bishop Auckland (7)
82	Newcastle Town (8)	0–1	Leek Town (7)
83	Newmarket Town (8)	1–3	Ilford (9)
84	Newport (Isle of Wight) (7)	1–1	Blackfield & Langley (8)
replay	Blackfield & Langley (8)	0–3	Newport (Isle of Wight) (7)
85	Haringey Borough (8)	0–1	Northwood (7)
86	Oxford City (7)	0–1	Cray Wanderers (8)
87	Pagham (8)	3–2	Bracknell Town (7)
88	Odd Down (8)	0–2	Paulton Rovers (8)
89	Pelsall Villa (8)	1–1	Borrowash Victoria (8)
replay	Borrowash Victoria (8)	1–4	Pelsall Villa (8)
90	Peterlee Newtown (8)	2–1	Billingham Synthonia (8)
91	Matlock Town (7)	2–2	Pickering Town (8)
replay	Pickering Town (8)	0–1	Matlock Town (7)
92	Porthleven (10)	0–5	Dorchester Town (7)
93	Corsham Town (9)	3–1	Portland United (8)
94	Histon (7)	2–3	Quorn (8)
95	Clitheroe (8)	1–3	Radcliffe Borough (7)
96	Ramsbottom United (8)	3–0	Chadderton (9)
97	Raunds Town (8)	5–1	Burnham Ramblers (9)
98	Arnold Town (8)	1–0	Racing Club Warwick (7)
99	Redditch United (7)	2–1	Grosvenor Park (8)

Tie	Home team (tier)	Score	Away team (tier)
100	Redhill (8)	1–3	Peacehaven & Telscombe (8)
101	Erith Town (8)	0–3	Ringmer (8)
102	Rocester (7)	3–0	Congleton Town (8)
103	Desborough Town (8)	1–2	Romford (9)
104	Rossendale United (7)	0–1	Ossett Albion (8)
105	Atherton Laburnum Rovers (8)	0–2	Rossington Main (9)
106	Rothwell Town (7)	3–1	Kingsbury Town (8)
107	Leighton Town (8)	2–2	Royston Town (8)
replay	Royston Town (8)	3–0	Leighton Town (8)
108	Oadby Town (8)	2–2	Rugby United (7)
replay	Rugby United (7)	2–3	Oadby Town (8)
109	South Shields (9)	1–2	Hallam (8)
110	Salisbury City (7)	1–2	Bideford (8)
111	Sandhurst Town (8)	2–6	Herne Bay (8)
112	Clacton Town (8)	3–1	Sawbridgeworth Town (9)
113	Farsley Celtic (7)	4–4	Seaham Red Star (9)
replay	Seaham Red Star (9)	1–6	Farsley Celtic (7)
114	Selby Town (8)	0–0	Newcastle Blue Star (8)
replay	Newcastle Blue Star (8)	2–4	Selby Town (8)
115	Selsey (8)	3–0	Ash United (8)
116	Halesowen Harriers (8)	1–3	Shepshed Dynamo (7)
117	Hungerford Town (8)	2–0	Shepton Mallet (9)
118	Shifnal Town (8)	1–4	Blackstones (8)
119	Shildon (8)	2–4	Salford City (8)
120	Frome Town (8)	0–1	Shortwood United (8)
121	Hatfield Main (9)	0–1	Shotton Comrades (9)
122	Skelmersdale United (8)	1–3	Penrith (9)
123	Sittingbourne (7)	2–2	Slade Green (8)
replay	Slade Green (8)	3–1	Sittingbourne (7)
124	Barking & East Ham United (7)	4–3	Soham Town Rangers (8)
125	Solihull Borough (7)	2–0	Oldbury United (8)
126	Fakenham Town (8)	1–3	Southend Manor (9)
127	Chasetown (8)	0–1	Spalding United (7)
128	Spennymoor United (7)	4–0	Consett (8)
129	Squires Gate (8)	1–2	Lincoln United (7)
130	Parkgate (9)	2–2	St Helens Town (8)
replay	St Helens Town (8)	3–1	Parkgate (9)
131	Merstham (8)	3–4	St Leonards (7)
132	St Margaretsbury (8)	2–0	Dunstable Town (8)
133	Letchworth (8)	1–1	Staines Town (7)
replay	Staines Town (7)	1–0	Letchworth (8)
134	Corby Town (7)	0–6	Stamford (7)
135	St Neots Town (8)	6–0	Stansted (9)
136	Staveley Miners Welfare (9)	0–1	Boston Town (8)
137	Stewart & Lloyds Corby (8)	1–0	Ford Sports Daventry (8)
138	Stocksbridge Park Steels (7)	17–1	Oldham Town (9)
139	Stotfold (8)	1–1	Hornchurch (7)
replay	Hornchurch (7)	4–4 (3–5 p)	Stotfold (8)
140	Stourport Swifts (7)	1–4	Alfreton Town (7)
141	Stowmarket Town (8)	1–6	Southall (8)
142	Stratford Town (8)	3–1	Ludlow Town (8)
143	Street (9)	1–3	Bemerton Heath Harlequins (8)
144	Atherstone United (7)	3–0	Studley (8)
145	Rushall Olympic (8)	1–4	Sutton Coldfield Town (7)
146	Chard Town (9)	2–0	Swindon Supermarine (7)
147	Bridport (8)	2–3	Taunton Town (7)
148	Barnstaple Town (8)	0–4	Team Bath (8)
149	AFC Totton (8)	2–0	Thamesmead Town (8)
150	Thame United (7)	1–2	Slough Town (7)
151	Lewes (7)	1–0	Thatcham Town (8)
152	Thornaby (9)	1–1	Dunston Federation Brewery (8)
replay	Dunston Federation Brewery (8)	2–1	Thornaby (9)
153	Tilbury (7)	4–3	Gorleston (8)
154	Tonbridge Angels (7)	2–3	Maidstone United (8)
155	Fareham Town (8)	1–1	Tooting & Mitcham United (7)
replay	Tooting & Mitcham United (7)	1–0	Fareham Town (8)
156	Tow Law Town (8)	2–1	Tadcaster Albion (9)
157	Horden Colliery Welfare (9)	2–1	Trafford (7)
158	Buckingham Town (8)	3–0	Tring Town (8)
159	Tuffley Rovers (8)	0–1	St Blazey (10)
160	Tunbridge Wells (8)	2–1	Ashford Town (Middx) (7)
161	Lowestoft Town (8)	0–2	Uxbridge (7)
162	Saltdean United (9)	0–3	VCD Athletic (8)
163	Sheffield (8)	0–4	West Auckland Town (8)
164	Walton & Hersham (7)	2–1	Andover (8)
165	Gosport Borough (8)	2–1	Wantage Town (8)
166	Ware (8)	5–1	Milton Keynes City (8)
167	Warrington Town (8)	2–2	Esh Winning (8)
replay	Esh Winning (8)	3–1	Warrington Town (8)
168	Washington (8)	0–2	North Ferriby United (7)
169	Wealdstone (7)	1–3	Leyton (8)
170	Cheshunt (8)	3–0	Wembley (7)
171	Torrington (9)	2–1	Westbury United (9)
172	Westfield (8)	1–2	Dorking (8)
173	Weston-super-Mare (7)	4–0	Calne Town (9)
174	Godalming & Guildford (8)	3–0	Whitchurch United (8)
175	Bedfont (8)	3–1	Whitehawk (8)
176	Whitley Bay (8)	2–2	Harrogate Railway Athletic (8)
replay	Harrogate Railway Athletic (8)	5–4	Whitley Bay (8)
177	Whitstable Town (8)	1–2	Chipstead (8)
178	Whyteleafe (7)	1–0	Reading Town (8)
179	Wick (8)	1–4	Abingdon United (8)
180	Willenhall Town (8)	1–0	Glapwell (8)
181	Willington (9)	0–0	Atherton Collieries (8)
replay	Atherton Collieries (8)	5–1	Willington (9)
182	Dawlish Town (8)	0–3	Wimborne Town (8)
183	Eastbourne Town (9)	1–1	Windsor & Eton (7)
replay	Windsor & Eton (7)	4–2	Eastbourne Town (9)
184	Great Harwood Town (9)	0–0	Winterton Rangers (9)
replay	Winterton Rangers (9)	0–0 (3–5 p)	Great Harwood Town (9)
185	Witham Town (8)	0–5	Wingate & Finchley (7)
186	Prescot Cables (8)	3–6	Witton Albion (7)
187	Fisher Athletic (7)	7–0	Wokingham Town (8)
188	Wisbech Town (8)	3–1	Woodbridge Town (8)
189	Morpeth Town (8)	1–0	Woodley Sports (8)
190	Wootton Blue Cross (8)	3–1	Brackley Town (8)
191	Fleetwood Town (8)	1–1	Workington (7)
replay	Workington (7)	1–0	Fleetwood Town (8)
192	Ossett Town (7)	0–2	Worsbrough Bridge Miners Welfare (9)
193	Bognor Regis Town (7)	1–0	Worthing (7)
194	Southall Town (8)	1–6	Wroxham (8)
195	Yate Town (8)	4–2	Hallen (9)
196	Northampton Spencer (8)	1–1	Yaxley (8)
replay	Yaxley (8)	5–1	Northampton Spencer (8)
197	Wivenhoe Town (7)	0–5	Yeading (7)
198	Garforth Town (8)	3–1	Yorkshire Amateur (9)

== First qualifying round ==
Matches on weekend of Saturday 14 September 2002. A total of 198 clubs took part in this stage of the competition, all having progressed from the preliminary round. Falmouth Town and St Blazey from the South Western Football League at Level 10 of English football were the lowest-ranked clubs to qualify for this round of the competition.

Tie	Home team (tier)	Score	Away team (tier)
1	Banbury United (7)	0–1	Barking & East Ham United (7)
2	Arnold Town (8)	1–1	Biddulph Victoria (8)
replay	Biddulph Victoria (8)	1–2	Arnold Town (8)
3	Bromley (7)	2–1	BAT Sports (8)
4	Chipstead (8)	1–3	Three Bridges (8)
5	Clevedon Town (7)	2–0	Dorchester Town (7)
6	Carshalton Athletic (7)	4–0	Dorking (8)
7	Eastbourne Borough (7)	6–2	AFC Newbury (8)
8	Eastleigh (8)	2–0	Croydon (7)
9	Cheshunt (8)	4–0	Edgware Town (8)
10	Falmouth Town (10)	1–2	Evesham United (7)
11	Flackwell Heath (8)	2–1	Buckingham Town (8)
12	Bridlington Town (8)	1–0	Garforth Town (8)
13	Gloucester City (7)	3–0	Bashley (7)
14	Chatham Town (7)	2–3	Godalming & Guildford (8)
15	Gosport Borough (8)	2–1	Deal Town (8)
16	Bromsgrove Rovers (7)	5–0	Gresley Rovers (7)
17	Great Harwood Town (9)	1–1	Crook Town (9)
replay	Crook Town (9)	1–1 (5–6 p)	Great Harwood Town (9)
18	Beaconsfield SYCOB (8)	5–0	Great Wakering Rovers (7)
19	Harefield United (8)	2–1	Barton Rovers (7)
20	Esh Winning (8)	1–2	Harrogate Railway Athletic (8)
21	Guiseley (7)	3–0	Hebburn Town (9)
22	Herne Bay (8)	3–2	Cowes Sports (8)
23	Hertford Town (7)	1–4	AFC Wallingford (8)
24	Highworth Town (8)	2–3	Cinderford Town (7)
25	Ilford (9)	2–3	Clacton Town (8)
26	Jarrow Roofing BCA (8)	2–4	Billingham Town (8)
27	Alfreton Town (7)	0–1	Kidsgrove Athletic (7)
28	Abingdon United (8)	2–3	Leatherhead (7)
29	Lewes (7)	2–1	Brockenhurst (8)
30	Leyton Pennant (7)	3–3	Great Yarmouth Town (8)
replay	Great Yarmouth Town (8)	5–1	Leyton Pennant (7)
31	Farsley Celtic (7)	3–1	Lincoln United (7)
32	Hillingdon Borough (8)	2–3	Lymington & New Milton (8)
33	Leyton (8)	0–1	Marlow (7)
34	Merthyr Tydfil (7)	2–0	Chard Town (9)
35	Metropolitan Police (7)	1–0	Corinthian-Casuals (7)
36	Molesey (7)	3–0	Fisher Athletic (7)
37	Morpeth Town (8)	0–1	Guisborough Town (8)
38	Kendal Town (7)	2–1	North Ferriby United (7)
39	Newport (Isle of Wight) (7)	0–4	Maidstone United (8)
40	Bedlington Terriers (8)	1–0	Ossett Albion (8)
41	AFC Totton (8)	3–1	Pagham (8)
42	Paulton Rovers (8)	2–1	Corsham Town (9)
43	Peacehaven & Telscombe (8)	1–2	Carterton Town (8)
44	Blackstones (8)	2–2	Pelsall Villa (8)
replay	Pelsall Villa (8)	3–2	Blackstones (8)
45	Chester-le-Street Town (8)	2–0	Penrith (9)
46	Peterlee Newtown (8)	4–0	Louth United (9)
47	King's Lynn (7)	4–1	Quorn (8)
48	Radcliffe Borough (7)	4–1	Abbey Hey (8)
49	Raunds Town (8)	1–3	AFC Sudbury (8)
50	Eastwood Town (7)	1–2	Redditch United (7)
51	Ringmer (8)	1–2	Chertsey Town (7)

Tie	Home team (tier)	Score	Away team (tier)
52	Nantwich Town (8)	2–0	Rocester (7)
53	Diss Town (8)	3–0	Romford (9)
54	Bishop Auckland (7)	3–3	Rossington Main (9)
replay	Rossington Main (9)	1–1 (4–1 p)	Bishop Auckland (7)
55	Royston Town (8)	3–2	London Colney (8)
56	Atherton Collieries (8)	1–0	Salford City (8)
57	Dunston Federation Brewery (8)	2–0	Selby Town (8)
58	Mickleover Sports (9)	0–1	Shepshed Dynamo (7)
59	Bemerton Heath Harlequins (8)	2–1	Shortwood United (8)
60	Horden Colliery Welfare (9)	4–1	Shotton Comrades (9)
61	Horsham (7)	3–0	Slade Green (8)
62	Solihull Borough (7)	9–0	Glossop North End (8)
63	Rothwell Town (7)	3–2	Southend Manor (9)
64	Leek Town (7)	2–1	Spalding United (7)
65	Spennymoor United (7)	1–1	Ashington (9)
replay	Ashington (9)	1–2	Spennymoor United (7)
66	St Blazey (10)	1–0	Bournemouth (8)
67	Eccleshill United (8)	3–2	St Helens Town (8)
68	St Leonards (7)	1–2	Slough Town (7)
69	St Margaretsbury (8)	1–2	Arlesey Town (7)
70	Hemel Hempstead Town (7)	7–1	St Neots Town (8)
71	Stamford (7)	3–1	Oadby Town (8)
72	Stewart & Lloyds Corby (8)	0–1	Burnham (7)
73	Hallam (8)	2–3	Stocksbridge Park Steels (7)
74	Aveley (7)	2–2	Stotfold (8)
replay	Stotfold (8)	0–2	Aveley (7)
75	Stratford Town (8)	1–2	Bedworth United (7)
76	Boston Town (8)	1–1	Sutton Coldfield Town (7)
replay	Sutton Coldfield Town (7)	2–0	Boston Town (8)
77	Devizes Town (8)	0–1	Taunton Town (7)
78	Team Bath (8)	3–1	Backwell United (8)
79	Tooting & Mitcham United (7)	0–0	Cobham (8)
replay	Cobham (8)	0–3	Tooting & Mitcham United (7)
80	Torrington (9)	0–1	Hungerford Town (8)
81	Tow Law Town (8)	5–4	Matlock Town (7)
82	Tunbridge Wells (8)	2–2	Selsey (8)
replay	Selsey (8)	2–1	Tunbridge Wells (8)
83	Staines Town (7)	1–2	Uxbridge (7)
84	VCD Athletic (8)	2–1	Bedfont (8)
85	West Auckland Town (8)	6–3	Chorley (7)
86	Walton & Hersham (7)	3–0	Cove (8)
87	Cray Wanderers (8)	1–0	Whyteleafe (7)
88	Willenhall Town (8)	0–2	Atherstone United (7)
89	Weston-super-Mare (7)	3–1	Wimborne Town (8)
90	Bognor Regis Town (7)	4–1	Windsor & Eton (7)
91	Wingate & Finchley (7)	2–0	Ware (8)
92	Northwood (7)	1–2	Wisbech Town (8)
93	Witton Albion (7)	1–1	Ramsbottom United (8)
replay	Ramsbottom United (8)	2–3	Witton Albion (7)
94	Workington (7)	2–1	Mossley (8)
95	Durham City (8)	5–1	Worsbrough Bridge Miners Welfare (9)
96	Wootton Blue Cross (8)	2–1	Wroxham (8)
97	Yate Town (8)	0–4	Bideford (8)
98	Southall (8)	2–3	Yaxley (8)
99	Tilbury (7)	0–2	Yeading (7)

== Second qualifying round ==
Matches played on weekend of Saturday 28 September 2002. A total of 168 clubs took part in this stage of the competition, including the 99 winners from the first qualifying round and 69 Level 6 clubs, from Premier divisions of the Isthmian League, Northern Premier League and Southern Football League, entering at this stage. The round featured St Blazey from the South Western Football League - the only level 10 league represented. Also, Great Harwood Town, Horden Colliery Welfare and Rossington Main from level 9 divisions were still in the competition.

Tie	Home team (tier)	Score	Away team (tier)
1	Three Bridges (8)	1–3	Aveley (7)
2	Aldershot Town (6)	3–1	Aylesbury United (6)
3	Accrington Stanley (6)	2–0	Billingham Town (8)
4	Carterton Town (8)	0–6	Arlesey Town (7)
5	Carshalton Athletic (7)	1–1	Chelmsford City (6)
replay	Chelmsford City (6)	1–0	Carshalton Athletic (7)
6	Diss Town (8)	2–3	Chertsey Town (7)
7	Dover Athletic (6)	2–0	Basingstoke Town (6)
8	Dunston Federation Brewery (8)	2–0	Burscough (6)
9	AFC Wallingford (8)	0–1	Eastbourne Borough (7)
10	Enfield (6)	1–5	Bishop's Stortford (6)
11	Evesham United (7)	1–1	Cinderford Town (7)
replay	Cinderford Town (7)	0–5	Evesham United (7)
12	Droylsden (6)	4–3	Farsley Celtic (7)
13	Canvey Island (6)	2–1	Folkestone Invicta (6)
14	Gainsborough Trinity (6)	3–2	Frickley Athletic (6)
15	Gateshead (6)	3–4	Barrow (6)
16	Beaconsfield SYCOB (8)	1–2	Gosport Borough (8)
17	Crawley Town (6)	3–0	Great Yarmouth Town (8)
18	Guisborough Town (8)	3–3	Guiseley (7)
replay	Guiseley (7)	1–0	Guisborough Town (8)
19	Godalming & Guildford (8)	0–1	Hampton & Richmond Borough (6)
20	Harefield United (8)	2–2	AFC Sudbury (8)
replay	AFC Sudbury (8)	5–0	Harefield United (8)
21	Harrogate Town (6)	2–0	Great Harwood Town (9)
22	Chester-le-Street Town (8)	5–5	Harrogate Railway Athletic (8)
replay	Harrogate Railway Athletic (8)	7–2	Chester-le-Street Town (8)
23	Havant & Waterlooville (6)	2–1	Harrow Borough (6)
24	Hayes (6)	6–0	Bognor Regis Town (7)
25	Hemel Hempstead Town (7)	3–1	Cray Wanderers (8)
26	Burnham (7)	0–1	Herne Bay (8)
27	Hednesford Town (6)	0–0	Hucknall Town (6)
replay	Hucknall Town (6)	3–3 (6–5 p)	Hednesford Town (6)
28	Ilkeston Town (6)	7–0	Atherstone United (7)
29	Altrincham (6)	1–0	Kendal Town (7)
30	Hinckley United (6)	3–0	Kidsgrove Athletic (7)
31	King's Lynn (7)	1–0	Cambridge City (6)
32	Clacton Town (8)	2–3	Kingstonian (6)
33	Lancaster City (6)	2–4	Blyth Spartans (6)
34	Leatherhead (7)	1–1	Bromley (7)
replay	Bromley (7)	2–4	Leatherhead (7)
35	Lewes (7)	0–0	Eastleigh (8)
replay	Eastleigh (8)	2–4	Lewes (7)
36	Lymington & New Milton (8)	3–1	Cheshunt (8)
37	Maidstone United (8)	2–5	Boreham Wood (6)
38	Marine (6)	2–2	Eccleshill United (8)
replay	Eccleshill United (8)	2–3	Marine (6)
39	Grays Athletic (6)	1–0	Marlow (7)
40	Bath City (6)	5–0	Merthyr Tydfil (7)
41	Ford United (6)	4–2	Metropolitan Police (7)
42	Molesey (7)	3–1	Hitchin Town (6)

Tie	Home team (tier)	Score	Away team (tier)
43	Bedworth United (7)	1–4	Moor Green (6)
44	Nantwich Town (8)	0–3	Arnold Town (8)
45	Gloucester City (7)	1–1	Newport County (6)
replay	Newport County (6)	4–0	Gloucester City (7)
46	Hungerford Town (8)	2–1	Paulton Rovers (8)
47	Bedford Town (6)	6–1	Pelsall Villa (8)
48	Durham City (8)	3–0	Peterlee Newtown (8)
49	Redditch United (7)	1–1	Leek Town (7)
replay	Leek Town (7)	1–2	Redditch United (7)
50	Rossington Main (9)	0–7	Radcliffe Borough (7)
51	Rothwell Town (7)	1–0	Barking & East Ham United (7)
52	Flackwell Heath (8)	2–2	Royston Town (8)
replay	Royston Town (8)	0–0 (3–5 p)	Flackwell Heath (8)
53	Hastings United (6)	4–1	Selsey (8)
54	AFC Totton (8)	2–2	Slough Town (7)
replay	Slough Town (7)	2–0	AFC Totton (8)
55	Solihull Borough (7)	0–2	Grantham Town (6)
56	Spennymoor United (7)	5–0	Atherton Collieries (8)
57	Bideford (8)	3–1	St Blazey (10)
58	Shepshed Dynamo (7)	0–2	Stafford Rangers (6)
59	Stocksbridge Park Steels (7)	0–2	Ashton United (6)
60	Sutton Coldfield Town (7)	0–2	Halesowen Town (6)
61	Heybridge Swifts (6)	1–1	Sutton United (6)
replay	Sutton United (6)	1–2	Heybridge Swifts (6)
62	Bromsgrove Rovers (7)	1–2	Tamworth (6)
63	Team Bath (8)	6–1	Bemerton Heath Harlequins (8)
64	Tiverton Town (6)	1–1	Taunton Town (7)
replay	Taunton Town (7)	0–2	Tiverton Town (6)
65	Hendon (6)	3–0	Tooting & Mitcham United (7)
66	Hyde United (6)	7–3	Tow Law Town (8)
67	Uxbridge (7)	1–2	Braintree Town (6)
68	Bedlington Terriers (8)	1–2	Vauxhall Motors (6)
69	Colwyn Bay (6)	4–0	West Auckland Town (8)
70	Runcorn Halton (6)	2–0	Wakefield & Emley (6)
71	Walton & Hersham (7)	1–0	Chesham United (6)
72	Maidenhead United (6)	1–2	Welling United (6)
73	Weston-super-Mare (7)	2–0	Clevedon Town (7)
74	Chippenham Town (6)	1–4	Weymouth (6)
75	Whitby Town (6)	0–4	Bradford Park Avenue (6)
76	St Albans City (6)	2–0	Wingate & Finchley (7)
77	Wisbech Town (8)	6–1	VCD Athletic (8)
78	Bridlington Town (8)	3–1	Witton Albion (7)
79	Wootton Blue Cross (8)	0–4	Purfleet (6)
80	Worcester City (6)	3–3	Stamford (7)
replay	Stamford (7)	1–2	Worcester City (6)
81	Stalybridge Celtic (6)	2–2	Workington (7)
replay	Workington (7)	3–1	Stalybridge Celtic (6)
82	Horden Colliery Welfare (9)	0–4	Worksop Town (6)
83	Horsham (7)	2–0	Yaxley (8)
84	Billericay Town (6)	3–1	Yeading (7)

== Third qualifying round ==
Matches played on weekend of Saturday 12 October 2002. A total of 84 clubs took part, all having progressed from the second qualifying round. The round featured fourteen clubs from Level 8 still in the competition, being the lowest ranked clubs in this round.

Tie	Home team (tier)	Score	Away team (tier)
1	Billericay Town (6)	4–0	Braintree Town (6)
2	Bradford Park Avenue (6)	3–5	Bridlington Town (8)
3	Canvey Island (6)	2–0	Aveley (7)
4	Durham City (8)	1–1	Blyth Spartans (6)
replay	Blyth Spartans (6)	3–1	Durham City (8)
5	Bishop's Stortford (6)	1–0	Eastbourne Borough (7)
6	Bideford (8)	3–1	Gosport Borough (8)
7	Guiseley (7)	2–1	Altrincham (6)
8	Accrington Stanley (6)	0–0	Harrogate Town (6)
replay	Harrogate Town (6)	3–2	Accrington Stanley (6)
9	Havant & Waterlooville (6)	4–0	Evesham United (7)
10	Grays Athletic (6)	2–1	Hayes (6)
11	Hemel Hempstead Town (7)	1–2	Arlesey Town (7)
12	Hastings United (6)	2–1	Hendon (6)
13	Heybridge Swifts (6)	1–0	Herne Bay (8)
14	Horsham (7)	1–0	Hungerford Town (8)
15	Barrow (6)	3–1	Hyde United (6)
16	Ilkeston Town (6)	6–1	King's Lynn (7)
17	Boreham Wood (6)	2–0	Kingstonian (6)
18	Leatherhead (7)	1–2	Ford United (6)
19	Aldershot Town (6)	2–0	Lewes (7)
20	Lymington & New Milton (8)	0–2	Crawley Town (6)
21	Dunston Federation Brewery (8)	0–1	Marine (6)

Tie	Home team (tier)	Score	Away team (tier)
22	Molesey (7)	3–1	Chertsey Town (7)
23	Moor Green (6)	3–1	Halesowen Town (6)
24	Flackwell Heath (8)	1–0	Purfleet (6)
25	Colwyn Bay (6)	1–2	Radcliffe Borough (7)
26	Redditch United (7)	0–1	Arnold Town (8)
27	Ashton United (6)	0–3	Runcorn Halton (6)
28	Slough Town (7)	4–2	Hampton & Richmond Borough (6)
29	Droylsden (6)	0–0	Spennymoor United (7)
replay	Spennymoor United (7)	3–2	Droylsden (6)
30	St Albans City (6)	1–0	Chelmsford City (6)
31	Stafford Rangers (6)	3–0	Rothwell Town (7)
32	Hinckley United (6)	1–3	Tamworth (6)
33	Newport County (6)	0–3	Team Bath (8)
34	Vauxhall Motors (6)	6–1	Gainsborough Trinity (6)
35	AFC Sudbury (8)	2–0	Walton & Hersham (7)
36	Dover Athletic (6)	2–2	Welling United (6)
replay	Welling United (6)	1–3	Dover Athletic (6)
37	Weston-super-Mare (7)	0–5	Bath City (6)
38	Tiverton Town (6)	4–2	Weymouth (6)
39	Wisbech Town (8)	1–0	Bedford Town (6)
40	Hucknall Town (6)	1–0	Worcester City (6)
41	Harrogate Railway Athletic (8)	4–0	Workington (7)
42	Grantham Town (6)	1–0	Worksop Town (6)

== Fourth qualifying round ==
Matches played on weekend of Saturday 26 October 2002. A total of 64 clubs took part, 42 having progressed from the third qualifying round and 22 clubs from Conference Premier, forming Level 5 of English football, entering at this stage. The round featured eight clubs from Level 8 still in the competition, being the lowest ranked clubs in this round.

Tie	Home team (tier)	Score	Away team (tier)
1	Bishop's Stortford (6)	1–1	Boreham Wood (6)
replay	Boreham Wood (6)	4–1	Bishop's Stortford (6)
2	Aldershot Town (6)	0–4	Dagenham & Redbridge (5)
3	Flackwell Heath (8)	1–4	Crawley Town (6)
4	Forest Green Rovers (5)	2–1	Ford United (6)
5	Burton Albion (5)	2–1	Halifax Town (5)
6	Havant & Waterlooville (6)	3–1	Billericay Town (6)
7	Hereford United (5)	1–0	Arlesey Town (7)
8	Heybridge Swifts (6)	2–0	Bideford (8)
9	Hastings United (6)	0–0	Kettering Town (5)
replay	Kettering Town (5)	0–5	Hastings United (6)
10	Gravesend & Northfleet (5)	1–2	Margate (5)
11	Harrogate Railway Athletic (8)	4–2	Marine (6)
12	Molesey (7)	0–6	Farnborough Town (5)
13	Moor Green (6)	2–1	Leigh RMI (5)
14	Morecambe (5)	3–1	Grantham Town (6)
15	Nuneaton Borough (5)	1–1	Barrow (6)
replay	Barrow (6)	4–3	Nuneaton Borough (5)
16	Radcliffe Borough (7)	2–4	Chester City (5)
17	Blyth Spartans (6)	1–3	Runcorn Halton (6)

Tie	Home team (tier)	Score	Away team (tier)
18	Arnold Town (8)	0–2	Scarborough (5)
19	Slough Town (7)	3–2	Canvey Island (6)
20	Southport (5)	4–1	Bridlington Town (8)
21	Northwich Victoria (5)	3–1	Spennymoor United (7)
22	AFC Sudbury (8)	1–2	St Albans City (6)
23	Ilkeston Town (6)	0–5	Stafford Rangers (6)
24	Grays Athletic (6)	1–2	Stevenage Borough (5)
25	Guiseley (7)	3–3	Tamworth (6)
replay	Tamworth (6)	2–3	Guiseley (7)
26	Horsham (7)	0–0	Team Bath (8)
replay	Team Bath (8)	1–1 (4–2 p)	Horsham (7)
27	Telford United (5)	0–2	Doncaster Rovers (5)
28	Barnet (5)	0–2	Tiverton Town (6)
29	Hucknall Town (6)	1–1	Vauxhall Motors (6)
replay	Vauxhall Motors (6)	5–1	Hucknall Town (6)
30	Wisbech Town (8)	0–2	Harrogate Town (6)
31	Dover Athletic (6)	1–1	Woking (5)
replay	Woking (5)	1–2	Dover Athletic (6)
32	Bath City (6)	1–1	Yeovil Town (5)
replay	Yeovil Town (5)	3–1	Bath City (6)

== 2002–03 FA Cup ==
See 2002–03 FA Cup for details of the rounds from the first round proper onwards.
