= Woodford United F.C. =

Association football club in England

Coordinates: 52°10′24″N 1°12′21″W

Woodford United
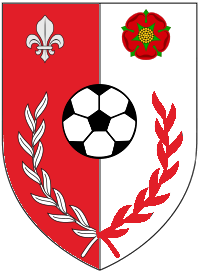
- Full name: Woodford United Football Club
- Nickname: The Reds
- Founded: 1946
- Ground: Byfield Road, Woodford Halse
- Capacity: 3,000
- Chairman: Mike Bailey
- Manager: Arron Parkinson
- League: Spartan South Midlands League Division One
- 2025–26: Hellenic League Division One, 15th of 18 (transferred)
Home colours	Away colours

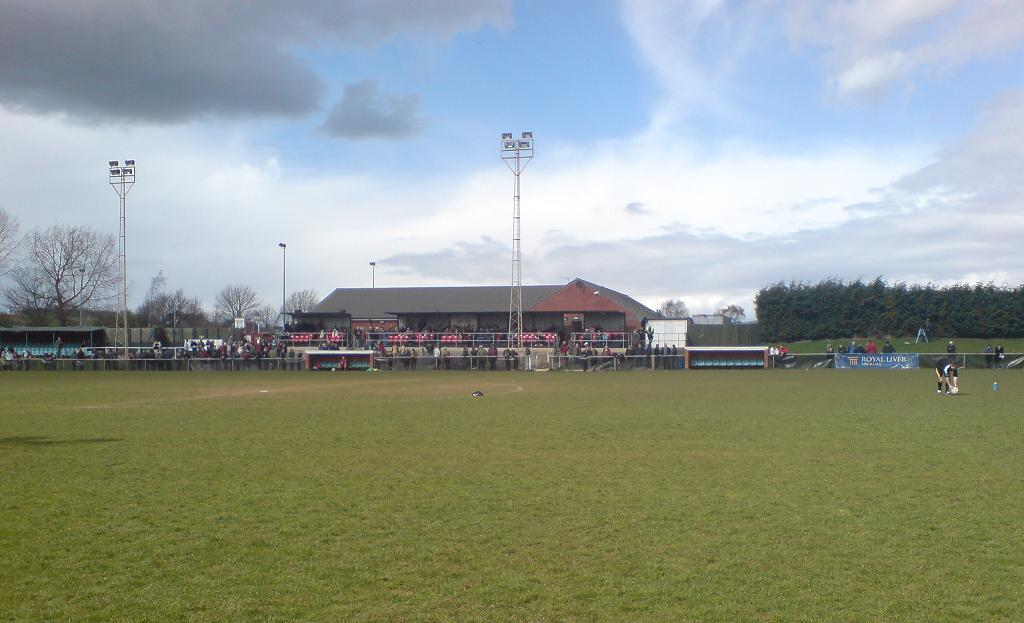
The main stand

Woodford United Football Club is a football club based in Woodford Halse, Northamptonshire, England. They are currently members of the Spartan South Midlands League Division One and play at Byfield Road.

== History ==
The club was established in 1946. After playing in the Rugby & District League, they joined the Central Northants Combination in 1964. They were Premier Division champions and League Cup winners in 1965–66 and retained the league title the following season. The club were Premier Division runners-up for the next two seasons, and after finishing third in 1969–70, they moved up to Division Three of the United Counties League.

Division Three was renamed Division Two in 1972 and Woodford went on to become Division Two champions in 1973–74, earning promotion to Division One. Although they finished fourth in their first season in Division One, they finished bottom of the table in 1975–76 and were relegated back to Division Two. Two seasons later they finished bottom of Division Two and dropped back into the Premier Division of the Central Northamptonshire Combination after their ground was sold off, forcing them to play on the village recreation ground.

Woodford finished second-from-bottom of the Premier Division in 1981–82 and were relegated to Division One. The following season they were Division One runners-up, but were not promoted. However, after finishing as runners-up again in 1986–87, they returned to the Premier Division. In 1991–92 the club won the Premier Division, and were runners-up for the next two seasons. After finishing as runners-up again in 1996–97, the club were Premier Division champions in 1997–98, winning 26 of their 28 games, and were promoted to Division One of the United Counties League.

A third-place finish in Division One in 2001–02 saw Woodford promoted to the Premier Division. They went on to win the Premier Division title in 2005–06, earning promotion to Division One Midlands of the Southern League. The division was renamed Division One Central in 2010, and the club finished bottom of the table in 2012–13, losing all 42 league games. As a result, they were voluntarily relegated two divisions into Division One of the United Counties League. The following season saw them lose all but one of their matches as they finished bottom of the table again. Despite improving in the next two seasons to finish fourteenth, the club dropped out of the United Counties League at the end of the 2016–17, returning to the Premier Division of the Northamptonshire Combination.

In 2024–25 Woodford finished fourth in the Northamptonshire Combination and were promoted to Division One of the Hellenic League. At the end of the 2025–26 season they were transferred to Division One of the Spartan South Midlands League.

== Honours ==
- United Counties League
  - Premier Division champions 2005–06
  - Division Two champions 1973–74
- Northamptonshire Combination
  - Champions 1965–66, 1966–67, 1991–92
  - League Cup winners 1965–66

== Records ==
- Best FA Cup performance: Third qualifying round, 2005–06, 2006–07
- Best FA Trophy performance: Second qualifying round, 2007–08
- Best FA Vase performance: Third round, 2004–05
- Record attendance: 1,500 vs Stockport County

== See also ==
- Woodford United F.C. players
- Woodford United F.C. managers
