= Irthlingborough Diamonds F.C. =

- Nickname: The Diamonds
- Founded: 1946
- Dissolved: 2011
- Ground: Nene Park, Irthlingborough
Home colours

Irthlingborough Diamonds was a football club from Irthlingborough, England, founded in 1946. In 1992, the club merged with Rushden Town to form Rushden & Diamonds, which played at Irthlingborough's Nene Park until financial troubles caused it to enter administration in July 2011.

== History ==
Irthlingborough Diamonds were founded in 1946 and joined the United Counties League in 1964. The club won the UCL First Division in 1970–71, but were not promoted to the Premier Division until after the next season, when they finished 3rd.

The 1970s and 1980s saw a sustained period of success, with the Diamonds only finishing outside the top half twice, and winning the league on three occasions. They also did well in the FA Vase, reaching the semi-finals twice (in 1981 and 1984) and the quarter-finals five times.

The club's reserve team also joined the UCL, playing in the second and first divisions until 1980 when they were moved to a special reserve division.

On 21 April 1992, it was announced that the club was to merge with nearby Southern League club Rushden Town to form a new club, Rushden & Diamonds. The merger was the brainchild of Max Griggs, the owner of Dr. Martens, and saw the new club play at Diamond's Nene Park (Rushden Town had been relegated from the Southern League's Premier Division the season before due to the poor state of their Hayden Road ground).

The new club assumed Rushden Town's place in the Midland Division of the Southern League. With stadium improvements and significant investment in the playing squad, the club advanced to the Football Conference by 1996, and into the Football League in 2001. However, Rushden & Diamonds was relegated back to the Conference following the 2005–2006 season in which they finished bottom of the table. In July 2011, after a period of instability and financial difficulties, the club was wound up and entered into administration after being expelled from Conference National.

Following the dissolution of Rushden & Diamonds, a "phoenix club," AFC Rushden & Diamonds, was formed, which as of the 2025-26 season, are members of the Northern Premier League Division One Midlands. Unlike Rushden & Diamonds F.C., the new club plays its home games in Rushden rather than Irthlingborough.

== Colours ==
The club's traditional colours were red shirts and blue shorts.

== Achievements ==
- FA Vase
  - Semi-finals: 1981, 1984
  - Quarter-finals: 5x
- UCL First Division
  - Winners: 1970–71
- Football Conference
  - Promotion to: 1995–96
- Football League Third Division
  - Promotion to: 2001
