= Rushden Town F.C. =

Rushden Town
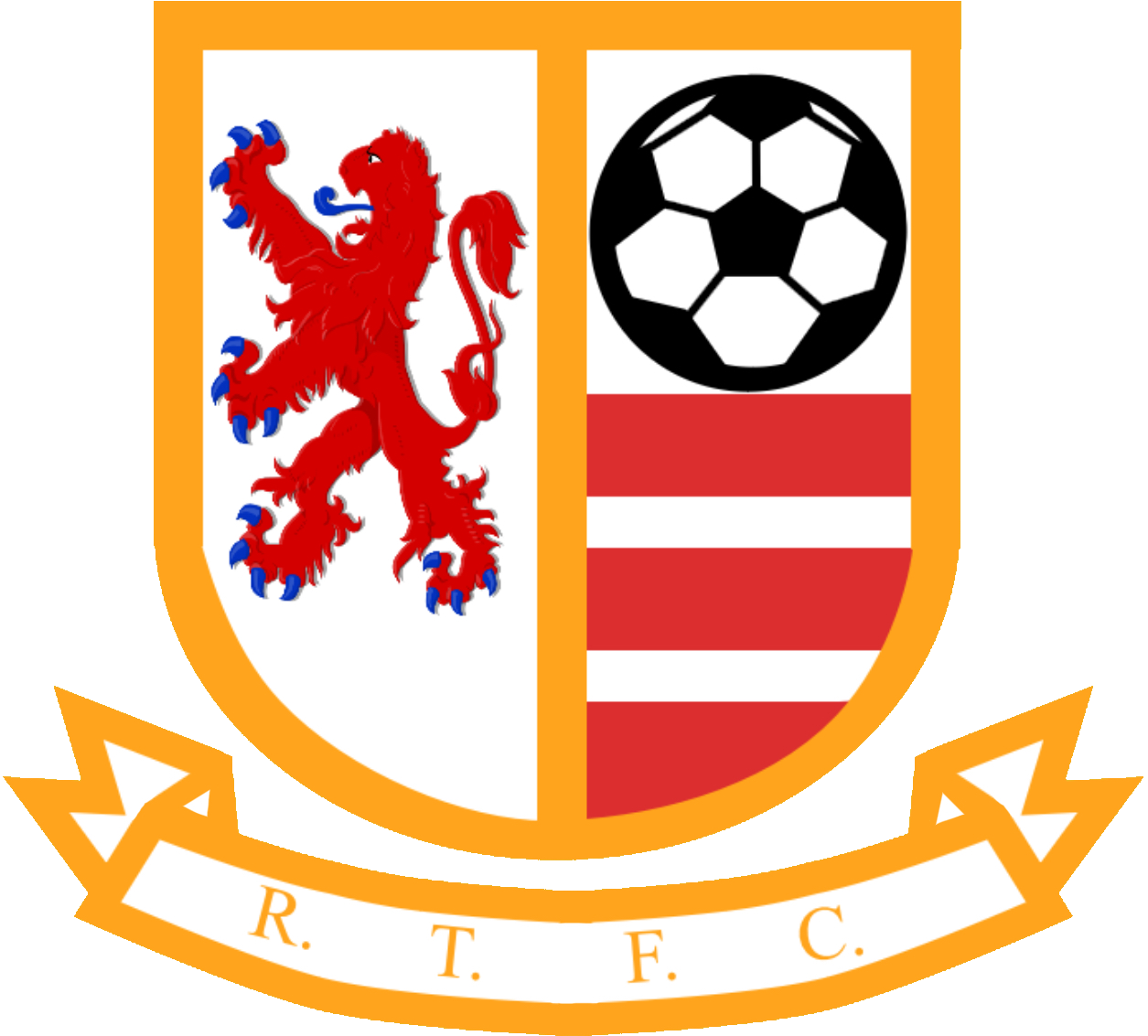
- Founded: 1889
- Dissolved: 1992 upon merger
- Ground: Hayden Road
- Capacity: 750
Home colours

Rushden Town F.C. was a football club from Rushden, England. Founded in 1889, the club merged with Irthlingborough Diamonds to form Rushden & Diamonds in 1992. Nicknamed "the Russians", the club played at Hayden Road.

== History ==
The club was founded in 1889 as Rushden F.C. and joined the Midland League in 1894. In 1895 the club's reserve team joined the Leicestershire and Northants League, but left the following season when it became the Leicestershire Senior League. In 1897 the club's first team also joined the United League, and played in both leagues for three seasons, before leaving the United League at the end of the 1898–99 season. In 1901 the club left the Midland League and joined the Northamptonshire League under the name Rushden Town. They left the league, but rejoined in 1919. The club left the league again in 1956 (by which time it had been renamed the United Counties League), but rejoined again in 1962.

The club experienced a sustained period of success during the 1970s and early 1980s, only finishing outside the top half twice, and in the top three on eight occasions. After finishing as runner-up in 1971–72, they won the UCL championship in 1972–73. The club's reserve team was also admitted to the UCL second division in 1970, playing in the league until 1980 when they moved to a specialist reserve division.

In 1983 the club were promoted to the Southern League after finishing as runners-up for the third time in six seasons. Placed in the Midland Division, they finished 7th in their first season. Despite finishing bottom in 1986–87, they were reprieved as the division was expanded to 22 clubs. Three years later they were promoted to the Premier Division after finishing as runners-up.

Although the club finished its first season in the Premier Division in eighth place, they were relegated back to the Midland Division due to the poor condition of their Hayden Road ground.

On 21 April 1992 it was announced that the club was to merge with nearby UCL club Irthlingborough Diamonds to form a new club, Rushden & Diamonds. The merge was the brainchild of Max Griggs, the owner of Dr. Martens, and saw the new club play at Irthlingborough's Nene Park.

The new club assumed Rushden Town's place in the Midland Division of the Southern League. With stadium improvements and significant investment in the playing squad, the club advanced to the Football Conference by 1996, and into the Football League in 2001, but were relegated back to the Conference in 2006 and went out of business in July 2011.

Following the dissolution of Rushden & Diamonds, a "phoenix club," AFC Rushden & Diamonds, was formed, which as of the 2018–19 season competes in the Southern Football League Premier Division Central (Level 7). Unlike Rushden & Diamonds F.C., the new club plays its home games in Rushden rather than Irthlingborough.

== Colours ==
The club's traditional colours were red and white; its final kit was red shirts, white shorts, and black socks.

== Ground ==
The 750-capacity main stand at Hayden Road football ground was opened in 1922. The opening match was a friendly against Aston Villa.

After the merger, Hayden Road was taken over by Rushden Rangers of the Northampton Combination. Rangers merged with UCL club Higham Town in 2007 to form Rushden & Higham United, with the new club playing at Hayden Road.

== Honours ==
- United Counties League
  - Champions 1934–35, 1963–64, 1972–73
  - Knockout Cup winners 1946–47
- Northants Senior Cup
  - Winners 1934–35
- South Midlands Floodlit Cup
  - Winners 1991–92

== Former players ==
1. Players that have played/managed in the Football League or any foreign equivalent to this level (i.e. fully professional league).
2. Players with full international caps.
3. Players that hold a club record or have captained the club.

- (Wales) Iori Jenkins
