= James King Blisworth F.C. =

Association football club in England

Blisworth
- Full name: Blisworth Football Club
- Founded: 1898
- Ground: Courteenhall Road, Blisworth
- Manager: Ryan Brown
- 2025–26: Northamptonshire Combination Premier Division, 2nd of 14 (withdrew)
Home colours

Blisworth Football Club is a football club based in Blisworth, near Northampton, in Northamptonshire, England.

== History ==
The club was formed in 1898 as Blisworth Football Club. The club joined the United Counties League Division Three in 1970. After two seasons, the division was renamed Division Two. After spending eight years in the United Counties League, Blisworth dropped back to local football. They re-joined the United Counties League in Division One in 1987, and remained there until resigning in 2006. Their highest league position was third placing in 1987–88.

After resigning, Blisworth entered the Northamptonshire Football Combination. They were promoted to the Premier Division after finishing as runners-up in Division One in 2011–12.

The following season the club reached the final of the Premier Division cup after a 1–0 win over Brixworth to reach the final for the first time since 1985.

Although unknown at the time the 2014/2015 season turned out to be the foundations for future success as Manager Broadbent made some signings to bolster his existing squad of young talent, although narrowly missing out on League success to Corby Eagles and losing in the Semi final of the Junior cup to United Counties League winners Northampton Spencer.

The 2015/16 season saw Blisworth take a stronghold of the Premier league and take the title comfortably. With all of the existing players deciding to re-sign for Broadbent Blisworth only required to make minimal inclusions for the 2016/17 season.

The 2016/17 season was historic for JK Blisworth as the squad, under the continued guidance of Simon Broadbent, completed a remarkable treble. The first trophy was claimed on the last day of the domestic league season as the League Champions reclaimed their status. This was soon followed by a 5-0 victory over league rivals Kettering Nomads in the Premier League Cup final. A week later JK Blisworth defeated UCL rivals Raunds Town under the floodlights at Northampton Town FC, thanks to an injury time winner by Dale Lewis in the Junior Cup Final. Blisworth was the first Northamptonshire Combination ever team to win the trophy.

The club withdrew from the Northamptonshire Combination at the end of the 2025–26 season, although it continued to run youth teams.

== Honours ==
- Northamptonshire Football Combination Premier Division
  - Runners-up: 2014-15
  - Winners: 2015–16
  - Winners: 2016–17
  - Winners: 2017–18
  - Winners: 2018–19
  - Winners: 2024–25
- Northamptonshire Football Combination Division One
  - Runners-up: 2011-12
  - Winners: 2018-19 (Reserves)
- Premier Division Cup
  - Winners: 2013–14
  - Winners: 2016–17
  - Winners: 2018–19
  - Winners: 2021–22
- Northamptonshire Junior Cup
- Winners: 2016–17
- Runners-up: 2018–19
- Winners: 2021-22
