= Eynesbury Rovers F.C. =

Association football club in England

Coordinates: 52°13′03.35″N 0°16′07.93″W

Eynesbury Rovers
- Full name: Eynesbury Rovers Football Club
- Founded: 1897
- Ground: Alfred Hall Memorial Ground, Eynesbury
- Chairman: Mark Spavins
- Manager: Neil Morris
- League: United Counties League Premier Division South
- 2024–25: United Counties League Premier Division South, 5th of 19
Home colours	Away colours

Eynesbury Rovers Football Club is a football club based in the Eynesbury area of St Neots in Cambridgeshire, England. The club are currently members of the United Counties League Premier Division South, and play at the Alfred Hall Memorial Ground.

== History ==
The club was established in 1897. After playing friendly matches, they joined the Biggleswade & District League, before switching to the St Neots Junior League. The club won the league in 1910–11 and went on to win their first major honour, the Hunts Senior Cup, in 1913–14. They won the Hunts Junior Cup in 1921, 1927 and 1932, and were champions of Division Two of the Bedford & District League in 1926–27, 1930–31 and 1931–32. In 1934 they joined Division Two of the South Midlands League and were promoted to Division One at the end of the first season in the league, which saw them finish as Division Two runners-up. After World War II the club switched to the United Counties League. They won the Hunts Senior Cup four times between 1946 and 1951, and the Hunts Premier Cup in 1951, before joining the Eastern Counties League in 1952, becoming the most westerly club ever to play in the league.

Eynesbury won the Hunts Senior Cup again in 1954–55 and 1956–57. However, financial problems forced the club to revert to amateur status. In 1960–61 they failed to win a league match all season and gained only three points, finishing bottom of the league. Although they won the Cambridgeshire Invitation Cup the following season, in 1962–63 they again finished bottom of the league and left to rejoin the United Counties League. They continued to struggle, finishing in the bottom two for five of the next eight seasons, although they did win the Senior Cup again in 1969–70. At the end of the 1971–72 season they finished bottom again and were relegated. In 1976–77 they won the (now-renamed) Division One and were promoted back to the Premier Division. The club won the Hunts Senior Cup in 1984–85 and then three times in a row between 1990–91 and 1992–93. Further wins were achieved in 1995–96 and 1999–2000.

In 2000–01 Eynesbury finished bottom of the Premier Division and were relegated to Division One. The following season they won their fifteenth Senior Cup. In 2012–13 the club were Division One runners-up and promoted to the Premier Division. They won the Senior Cup again in 2016–17. At the end of the 2018–19 season the club were transferred to the Premier Division of the Spartan South Midlands League. Two seasons later they were transferred back to the United Counties League, joining the Premier Division South. In 2024–25 the club won the League Cup for the first time, beating Lincoln United 2–0 in the final. They also finished fifth in the Premier Division South, qualifying for the promotion play-offs, in which they lost 5–0 to Aylestone Park in the semi-finals.

== Ground ==
The club initially played at the Priory Park Recreation Ground, before moving to a field on Cemetery Lane. For a while they shared St Neots Town's Shortsands ground, before moving to their current Hall Road ground in the early 1930s. The ground was initially known as "Mr Walton's Field", and was later renamed the Alfred Hall Memorial Ground. The main stand was built in 1952, with terracing on each side. The ground's record attendance of 5,000 was set for a friendly match against Fulham in 1955, a game during which Stanley Matthews played for Eynesbury. The terracing on one side of the main stand was removed to build a clubhouse in 1977, with the other section removed in 1981 when floodlights were installed. The roof of the clubhouse was later extended to provide a covered standing area, with a small stand erected on the other side of the pitch to the main stand.

== Honours ==
- United Counties League
  - Division One champions 1976–77
  - League Cup winners 2024–25
- Bedford & District League
  - Division Two champions 1926–27, 1930–31, 1931–32
- St Neots Junior League
  - Champions 1910–11
- Hunts Premier Cup
  - Winners 1950–51, 1990–91, 1995–96
- Hunts Senior Cup
  - Winners 1913–14, 1946–47, 1948–49, 1949–50, 1950–51, 1954–55, 1956–57, 1969–70, 1984–85, 1990–91, 1991–92, 1992–93, 1995–96, 1999–2000, 2001–02, 2016–17
- Hunts Junior Cup
  - Winners 1920–21, 1926–27, 1931–32
- Cambridgeshire Invitation Cup
  - Winners 1961–62
- United Counties League Cup
  - Winners 2024-25

== Records ==
- Best FA Cup performance: Fourth qualifying round, 1954–55
- Best FA Vase performance: Fourth round, 2019–20
- Record attendance: 5,000 vs Fulham, friendly match, 1955

== See also ==
- Eynesbury Rovers F.C. players
- Eynesbury Rovers F.C. managers
