= Olney Town F.C. =

Coordinates: 52°09′20.38″N 0°41′56.51″W

Olney Town
- Full name: Olney Town Football Club
- Nickname(s): The Nurserymen
- Founded: 1903
- Dissolved: 2018
- Ground: East Street, Olney
Home colours	Away colours

Olney Town Football Club was a football club based in Olney, Buckinghamshire, England.

== History ==
They were established in 1903 and were founder members of the North Bucks League in 1911. Following World War I they joined the South East Northants League, but returned to the North Bucks League in the 1930s, winning its second division in 1932–33. In 1954 they rejoined the South East Northants League, which had by then been renamed the Rushden & District League, but moved back to the North Bucks League again by the early 1960s. In 1966 they joined the United Counties League where they remained until 2018.

They won the Division One title in 1972–73 but were not promoted to the Premier Division until after they finished as runners-up in Division One two years later. The club had a five-season spell in the Premier Division before being relegated to Division One in 1980. They folded at the end of the 2017–18 after failing to find new board members to take over the club.

During their spell in the Premier Division, they competed in the national FA Competitions; twice in the FA Cup losing in the first qualifying round each time, and three times in the FA Vase, with a best run in 1977–78 when they reached the third round (last 64).

== Honours ==
- United Counties League
  - Division One champions 1972–73
  - Division One runners-up 1974–75
- Rushden & District League
  - Division One champions 1957–58, 1960–61
- North Bucks League
  - Division One champions 1961–62
  - Division Two champions 1932–33
- Berks and Bucks Intermediate Cup
  - Winners 1993
- Daventry Charity Cup
  - Winners 1978

== Records ==
- FA Cup
  - First Qualifying Round 1978–79, 1979–80
- FA Vase
  - Third Round 1977–78
