= Wootton Blue Cross F.C. =

Association football club in England

Wootton Blue Cross
- Full name: Wootton Blue Cross Football Club
- Nickname: The Blue Cross
- Founded: 1887
- Dissolved: 2004
- Ground: Weston Park, Wootton
- Capacity: 2000
- Chairman: Jeremy Hall
- Manager: Steve Marsh
- League: Bedfordshire County League Premier Division
- 2025–26: Bedfordshire County FA Premier League.
Home colours

Wootton Blue Cross Football Club are a football club based in Wootton, near Bedford, Bedfordshire, England. In the 2002–03 season, they reached the 4th round of the FA Vase. As of the 2024/25 season they are members of the Bedfordshire County League Premier Division and play home games at Weston Park.

The club is affiliated to the Bedfordshire County Football Association, and play in the Premier Division.

== History ==
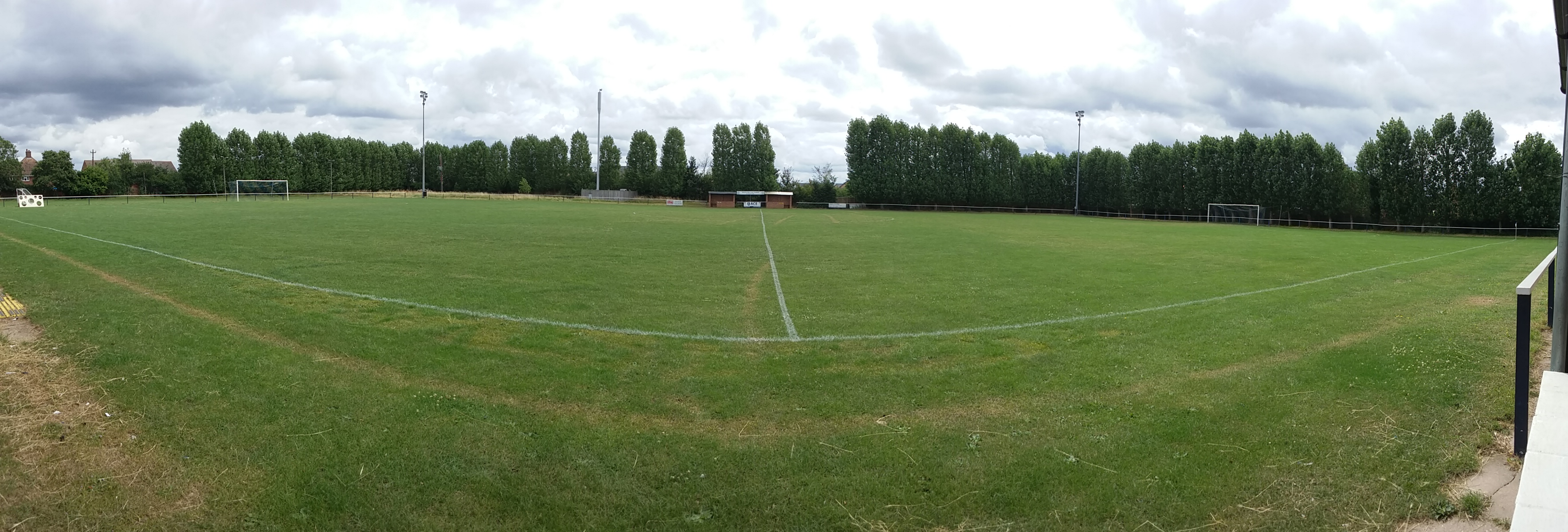
Weston Park in July 2019

The club was formed in 1887 and its name was reputedly brought to Wootton when the manager of the disbanded Hitchin Blue Cross joined the club.

The Club started in the Bedford and District League before joining the South Midlands League in 1946 where they won the league title in 1947–48 and finished runners up in 1949–50. Wootton joined the United Counties League in 1954, winning the league title in 1967–68 and 1969–70. Wootton were promoted to the new UCL Premier League in 1972.

In the 1960s Wootton won the Hinchingbrooke Cup no less than four times. In 1970–71 under the guidance of the Chairman/Manager Doug Field and captained by Phil Burraway they won the Bedfordshire Senior Cup beating Leighton Town 1–0 at Kenilworth Road. They won the Senior Cup again in 2000–01 under Manager Jon Taylor.

Former Luton Town boss Lil Fuccillo joined the coaching staff in 2001 with immediate effect the team racing to the top of the league with a ten match winning run. Following a mid season run of injury and sickness the team fell to a disappointing but credible fifth place.

In 2003, Lil left to join his old comrade Barry Fry at Peterborough United and was replaced by Bobby Roberts. The team then had a very exciting run in the FA Vase getting to the fourth round before losing to (the subsequent holders) Whitley Bay. A large crowd saw Wootton go down 2–1 in extra time. The team finished third in the league and beat St. Neots to win the Hinchingbrooke Cup once again. At the end of the season Jon left to join St Neots and was replaced by Kenny Davidson who for the first time brought home the Hunts Premier Cup.

After a sudden exit by Kenny and several of the players the reserve manager Phil Silvestry took the reins and with a young squad kept the Club in the Premier division. In his first full season the team finished mid table and despite an excellent start in 2006–07, lying in 3rd position at Christmas, finished 9th. In 2007–08 the Club worked through four different managers and were relegated after 38 years in the Premier Division.

In 2008–09, long serving physio Mel Roberts took over the Manager's spot assisted by long serving captain Scott McGregor as coach. Despite a bright start the season ended with an eight-game win-less streak with the club just avoiding relegation.

Current manager, and ex-player, Andy Arnold, joined the club for the 2009–10 season after a spell managing Bedford United. Blue Cross also signed Calum Davenport in order to get him fit and to try to get themselves back into the United Counties League. For the 2011–12 season, Davenport also became first team coach as well as player.

== Honours ==
- United Counties League
  - Division Two champions 1967–68, 1969–70
- South Midlands League
  - Premier Division Champions 1947–48
- Bedfordshire Senior Cup
  - Winners 1970–71, 2000–01
- Bedfordshire Junior Cup
  - Winners 1921–22

== Records ==
- Highest league position: 2nd in the United Counties League Premier Division, 1980–81
- Best FA Cup performance: Second qualifying round, 1950–51, 2001–02, 2002–03
- Best FA Vase performance: Fourth round, 2002–03

== See also ==
- Wootton Blue Cross F.C. players
