= Raunds Town F.C. =

Association football club in England

Coordinates: 52°21′08.14″N 0°32′43.67″W

Raunds Town
- Full name: Raunds Town Football Club
- Nickname: The Shopmates
- Founded: 1946
- Ground: Kiln Park, Raunds, Northamptonshire, NN9 6EQ
- Capacity: 3,000 (250 seats)
- Chairman: TBC
- Manager: Alfie Taylor
- League: Northamptonshire Combination Premier Division
- 2025–26: Northamptonshire Combination Premier Division, 7th of 14
Home colours	Away colours

Raunds Town F.C. is a football club based at Raunds, Northamptonshire, England. The play in the Northamptonshire Combination Premier Division. They were FA Vase semi-finalists in 1994–95.

== History ==
Raunds Town was founded in 1946. There had been other teams with "Raunds" in the title as long ago as 1896–97, but at a meeting in the town's Temperance Hall in May 1946 a new amalgamated club was formed. The club is nicknamed "The Shopmates" in reference to the local boot and shoe industry, which was largely workshop-based.

In 1950 the Shopmates joined the United Counties League (formerly the Northamptonshire League), playing in the Second Division. They did not set the league on fire, and after switching between the divisions settled in Division One after the former first division was redesignated the Premier Division. A season in Division Two in 1979–80 seemed to wake them up: after the division was disbanded at the end of that season, the Shopmates returned to Division One and were promoted as champions in 1982–83.

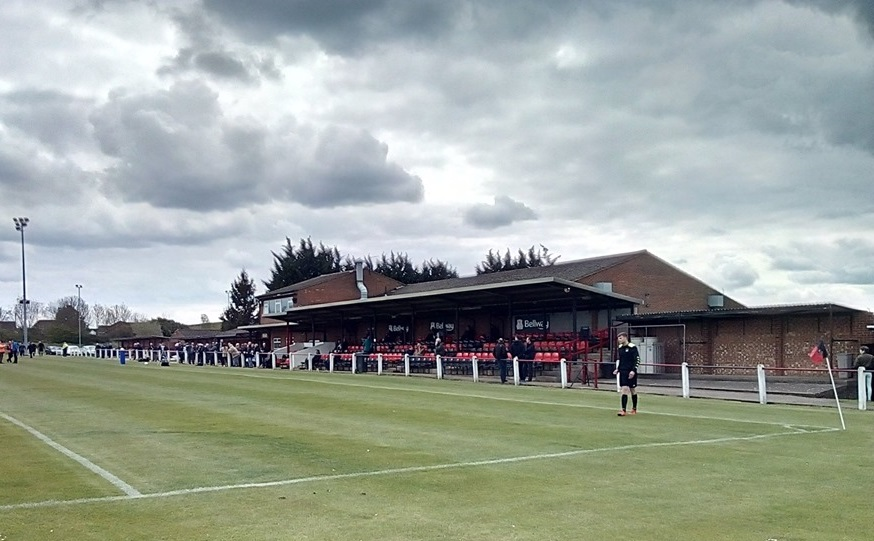
Kiln Park, home of Raunds Town

Raunds Town embarked upon an ambitious programme. Having played at Greenhouse Field for two years at the start, they moved to The Berristers for thirty-three seasons and in 1991 they moved to Kiln Park. The stadium adjacent to the A45 was designed to host football at a higher level. The Shopmates' on-field performance matched this munificence. In 1992–93 they won at Northwich Victoria 2–0 to eliminate their hosts from the FA Cup in the Second Qualifying Round, thus far the only time a UCL club has eliminated Conference opposition from the competition. In 1994–95 the Shopmates lost the FA Vase semi-final against Arlesey Town having led 3–0 after the first (home) leg. The following season they were eliminated in the quarter-final by Bristol club Mangotsfield United. In 2006–07 the Shopmates eliminated Isthmian League side Enfield from the FA Cup by way of a 2–1 away win, gaining revenge for a reverse in the same competition at their hands eight seasons before.

Meanwhile, in the United Counties League, the leadership of manager Keith Burt led an assault on the top of the table. Having lost out on the championship on goal difference in 1994–95, Raunds seized the title the following season. They were duly promoted to the Southern League, where they took their place in the Midland Division. However, they suffered from their geographical location close to the boundary between the divisions and in 1998–99, the Shopmates were shifted to the Southern Division, which was renamed the Eastern Division the following season. This had financial implications, not least the cost of travelling, and for two seasons Raunds Town struggled. Manager Keith Burt resigned, and the club had little option but to apply for re-admission to the United Counties League at the end of 1999–2000.

In the 2012–13 season, Raunds Town were managed by Stuart Brown. 2013-14 saw the arrival of co-managers James Le Masurier and Scott Manning. At the end of the 2020–21 season the club were transferred to Division One of the Spartan South Midlands League.

== Staff Positions ==
- First Team Manager: Alfie Taylor
- Head Coach: Ryan Lovell
- First Team Coach: Lee Tyler
- Reserve Team Manager: No Team
- U18 Manager: No Team

== Honours ==
- United Counties League Premier Division
  - Runners-up 1991–92, 1994–95
- United Counties League Division One
  - Champions 1982–83

== Records ==
- FA Cup
  - Fourth Qualifying Round 1998–99
- FA Trophy
  - Third Round 1998–99
- FA Vase
  - Semi-finals 1994–95
