= Stewarts & Lloyds Corby A.F.C. =

Association football club in England

Coordinates: 52°29′59.07″N 0°41′36.06″W

Stewarts & Lloyds Football Club
- Full name: Stewarts & Lloyds Football Club
- Founded: 1935
- Ground: Occupation Road, Corby
- Capacity: 125
- Chairman: John Davies
- Manager: Dave Parker
- League: Northamptonshire Combination Premier Division
- 2025–26: Northamptonshire Combination Premier Division, 8th of 14
Home colours	Away colours

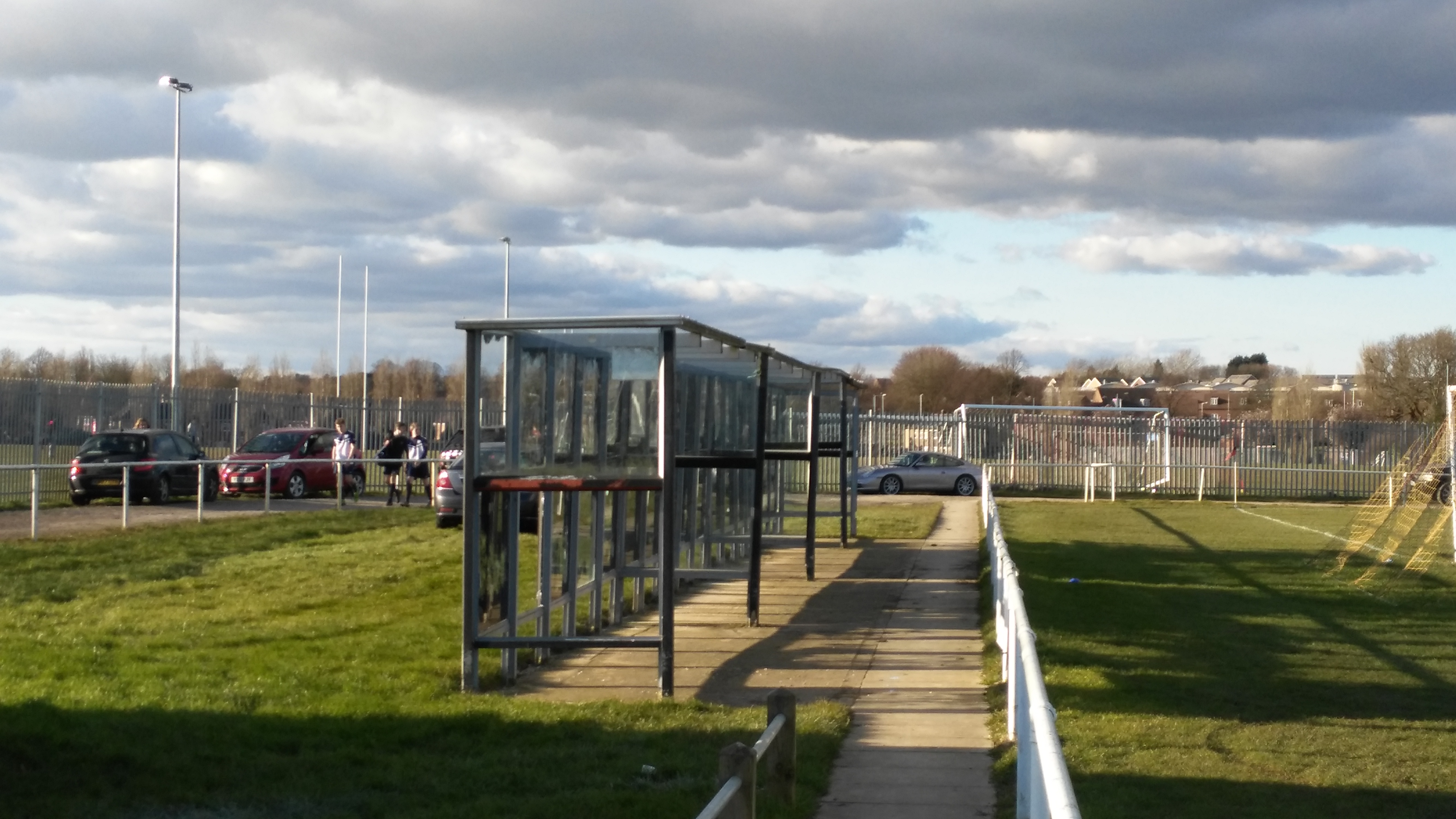

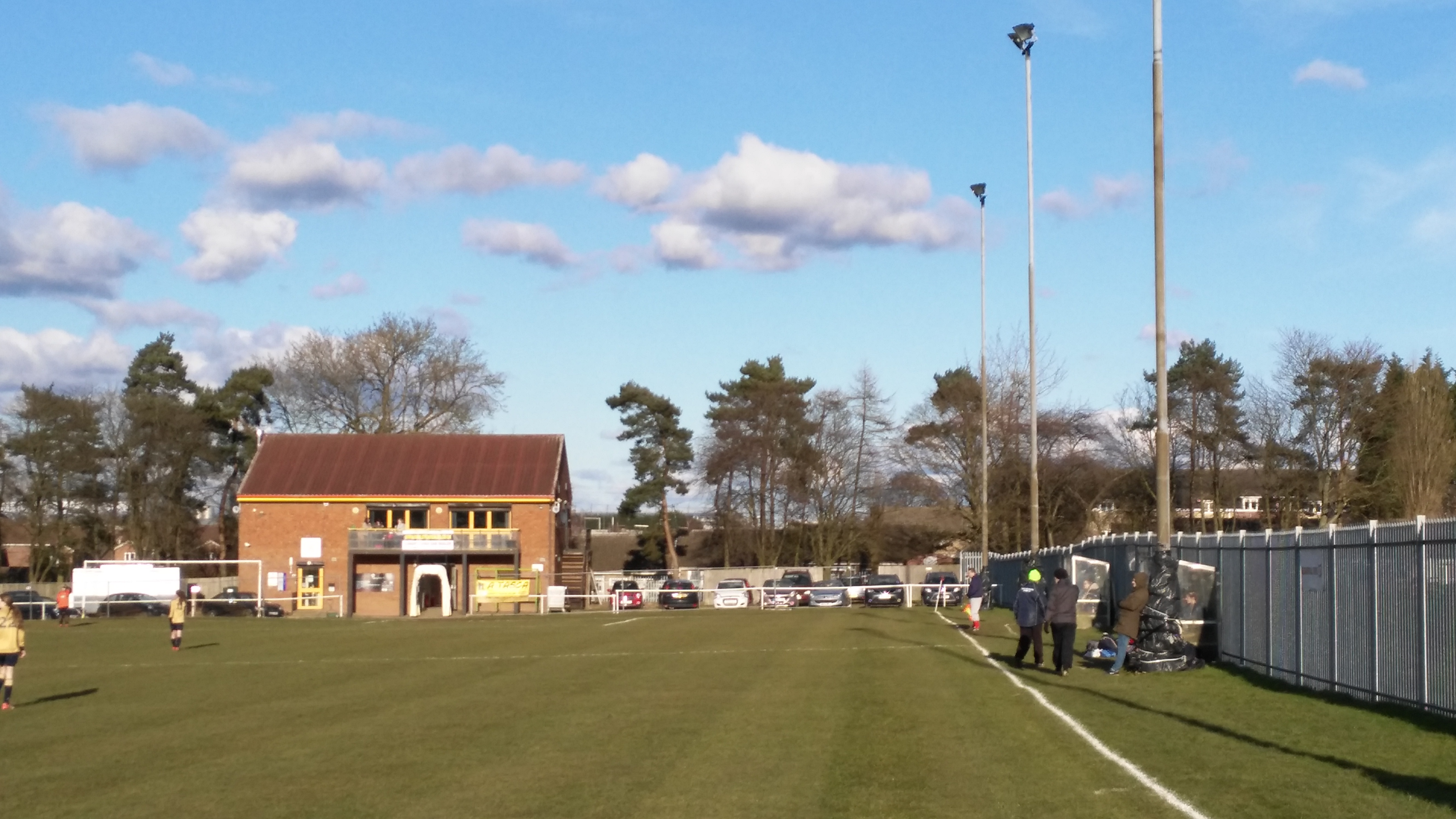

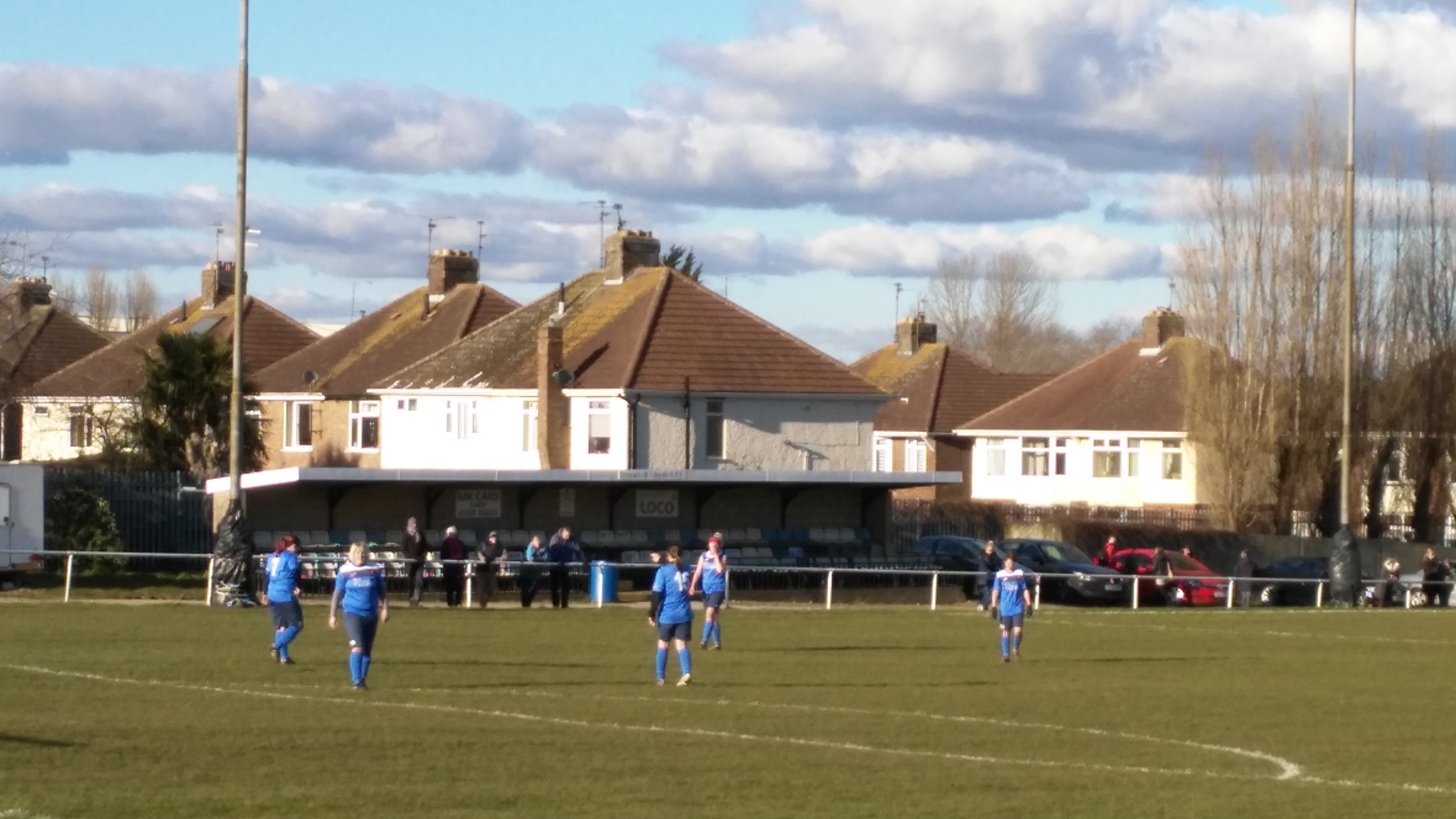

Stewarts & Lloyds A.F.C. is a football club based in Corby, Northamptonshire, England. The club plays in the Northamptonshire Combination Premier Division, The 2021/22 First team was managed by Paul Sheridan and Dave Parker.

== History ==
The club was founded in 1935 as the works team of the Stewarts & Lloyds Iron & Steel Company. S & L was the principal steel company exploiting the ironstone in the area, and the major employer in Corby. The club was a leading contender in the United Counties League.

In 1948 a rival club, Corby Town was formed in the town. Most of the key S & L personnel joined the new club, leaving a rump which joined the Kettering Amateur League. The club won the Kettering Amateur League championship in 1954, and they joined the United Counties League in 1957.

The club's form in the league was indifferent, but they won the Division One championship in 1973–74 and 1974–75 and were promoted to the Premier Division for 1975–76, where they played until relegation at the end of 2013/14 season. The club nearly went under in 1989 before a rescue by local businessman John Georgiou, who changed the name to Hamlet S&L after his company for three seasons.

The club installed floodlights in 1992, which allowed them to enter more competitions, including the FA Cup for the first time since the war. They have also made ground improvements with the assistance of a lottery grant.

They reached the second qualifying round of the FA Cup in season 2008–09, before winning the UCL that year.

In July 2011, the club employed Lee Duffy alongside Daren Young as joint managers. Duffy took the role up solely in March 2012, and he resigned from first team manager duties in September 2012, though he was to remain in the club as Football Development manager. He was replaced by former co-manager, Daren Young, who was assistant manager at Corby Town for a short period. For the 2014–2015 season, Barry Britton took over as first team manager. He left the club after 8 games due to work commitments, with Alex Cross taking charge. In 2015/16 season John Cairns and Harbs Basra took the reins. S&L finish third in the ucl first division just narrowly missing out on promotion. The following season Ian Benjamin took charge for two seasons. On 23 December 2017 Sean and Del took charge of the first team following the resignation of Ian Benjamin

Following the completion of Season 17/18 S&L were relegated from the UCL into the Northamptonshire Combination Premier Division.

== Honours ==
- United Counties League Premier Division
  - Champions 2008–09
- United Counties League Division One
  - Champions 1973–74, 1974–75
- United Counties League Cup
  - Winners 1986–87

== Records ==
- FA Cup
  - Second Qualifying Round 2008–09, 2010–11
- FA Vase
  - Fourth Round 2008–09

== See also ==
- Stewarts & Lloyds Corby A.F.C. players
