= Desborough Town F.C. =

Association football club in England

Coordinates: 52°26′43.24″N 0°49′45.29″W

Desborough Town
- Full name: Desborough Town Football Club
- Nicknames: Ar Tarn, Blues
- Founded: 1896
- Ground: Waterworks Field, Desborough
- Chairman: Ernie Parsons
- Manager: Neil Healey
- League: United Counties League Premier Division South
- 2025–26: Spartan South Midlands League Division One, 2nd of 21 (promoted via play-offs)
- Website: http://www.pitchero.com/clubs/desboroughtown
Home colours

Desborough Town Football Club is a football club based in Desborough, Northamptonshire, England. They are currently members of the United Counties League Premier Division South and play at Waterworks Field.

== History ==
The club was established in 1896 and joined Division One of the Northamptonshire League in the same year. They won back-to-back league titles in 1900–01 and 1901–02, and were runners-up in 1902–03. They won the title again in 1906–07, and were runners-up in 1910–11. After another second-place finish in 1919–20, they won the league for a fourth time in 1920–21. This was repeated soon afterwards as they finished as runners-up in 1922–23 and won a fifth league title in 1923–24, going on to retain the title the following season. In 1926–27 the club reached the first round of the FA Cup for the first time; drawn away to Third Division North Doncaster Rovers, the team were drawing the game before it was abandoned with eight minutes left due to fog. In the replayed match, Doncaster won 3–0. A seventh title was won in 1927–28.

In 1934 the league was renamed the United Counties League. They were league champions again in 1948–49, but finished bottom of the league in 1954–55 and 1955–56, winning only one league match during the latter season. Another league title was won in 1966–67. The club won the League Cup in 1977–78 and 2000–01.

== Reserve team ==
The club's reserve team joined Division Two of the Northamptonshire League in 1901. Although they left the league at the end of the 1902–03 season, they rejoined in 1907. After finishing as runners-up in 1909–10, they won the division in 1910–11. Another second-place finish was achieved in 1926–27, with the team going on to win the division in 1928–29. However, they left the league at the end of the 1929–30 season.

== Honours ==
- United Counties League
  - Champions 1900–01, 1901–02, 1906–07, 1920–21, 1923–24, 1924–25, 1927–28, 1948–49, 1966–67
  - League Cup winners 1977–78, 2000–01
- Northamptonshire Senior Cup
  - Winners 1910–11, 1913–14, 1928–29, 1951–52
- Maunsell Cup
  - Winners 1923–24
- Northamptonshire Junior Cup
  - Winners 1900–01, 1907–08, 1921–22, 1926–27, 1965–66, 2024-25

== Records ==
- Best FA Cup performance: First round, 1926–27
- Best FA Trophy performance: Second qualifying round, 1970–71
- Best FA Vase performance: Fifth round, 1979–80
- Biggest win: 14–0, 1924–25

== See also ==
- Desborough Town F.C. players
