= 2012–13 United Counties League =

The 2012–13 United Counties League season (known as the 2012–13 ChromaSport & Trophies United Counties League for sponsorship reasons) was the 106th in the history of the United Counties League, a football competition in England.

== Premier Division ==
United Counties League Premier Division
- Season: 2012–13
- Champions: Holbeach United
- Promoted: St. Ives Town
- Relegated: Blackstones; Irchester United
- Matches: 420
- Goals: 1,543 (3.67 per match)

The Premier Division featured 17 clubs which competed in the division last season, along with four new clubs.

- Clubs promoted from Division One:
  - Harborough Town
  - Huntingdon Town
- Clubs relegated from the Northern Premier League:
  - Quorn
  - Shepshed Dynamo
- From this league, only Quorn, St Ives Town and Spalding United applied for promotion.

=== League table ===
Pos	Team	Pld	W	D	L	GF	GA	GD	Pts	Promotion or relegation
1	Holbeach United	40	31	5	4	114	34	+80	98	
2	St Ives Town	40	27	9	4	114	42	+72	90	Promoted to the Southern Football League
3	Spalding United	40	29	5	6	117	48	+69	89 (Note: Spalding United were deducted three points for fielding an ineligible player)	
4	Huntingdon Town	40	25	4	11	104	69	+35	79	
5	Deeping Rangers	40	22	10	8	93	47	+46	76	
6	Newport Pagnell Town	40	22	7	11	84	58	+26	73	
7	Quorn	40	20	8	12	89	57	+32	68	Transferred to the Midland Alliance
8	Cogenhoe United	40	18	6	16	81	67	+14	60	
9	Shepshed Dynamo	40	16	9	15	82	63	+19	57	Transferred to the Midland Alliance
10	Boston Town	40	15	9	16	68	72	−4	54	
11	Desborough Town	40	15	7	18	67	71	−4	52	
12	Yaxley	40	12	11	17	58	72	−14	47	
13	Peterborough Northern Star	40	12	9	19	56	75	−19	45	
14	Stewarts & Lloyds Corby	40	11	11	18	54	84	−30	44	
15	Wellingborough Town	40	12	8	20	55	89	−34	44	
16	Long Buckby	40	11	9	20	54	82	−28	42	
17	Kempston Rovers	40	10	8	22	56	85	−29	38	
18	Sleaford Town	40	10	8	22	47	88	−41	38	
19	Harborough Town	40	10	8	22	55	101	−46	38	
20	Blackstones	40	10	6	24	58	94	−36	36	Relegated to Division One
21	Irchester United	40	2	3	35	37	145	−108	9	Relegated to Division One

Source: fchd
Rules for classification: 1) points; 2) goal difference; 3) number of goals scored.

=== Results ===
Home \ Away	KEM	BLK	BOS	COG	DEE	DES	HAR	HOL	HUN	IRC	LBU	NPT	PNS	QON	SPD	SLE	SPA	STI	SLC	WLT	YAX
Kempston Rovers		1–0	0–3	1–0	2–1	3–3	0–0	2–4	0–3	1–1	2–2	0–3	3–0	2–4	0–1	5–0	1–5	2–4	1–1	5–2	2–0
Blackstones	1–1		0–2	1–4	0–2	1–2	4–2	1–0	3–5	3–1	2–1	0–3	1–3	1–2	5–3	1–1	1–3	0–1	1–3	3–3	1–3
Boston Town	4–1	0–0		2–0	1–2	1–2	0–4	0–4	1–0	4–0	3–0	1–1	3–3	4–3	0–2	0–0	3–3	0–2	2–2	1–2	2–1
Cogenhoe United	0–2	3–2	4–4		2–2	1–2	7–1	2–0	2–1	4–0	2–1	1–2	2–1	3–0	2–1	2–3	1–2	1–3	6–1	2–1	1–2
Deeping Rangers	4–2	3–0	4–1	1–1		2–1	4–1	1–3	2–1	6–1	1–0	0–0	0–1	2–4	2–1	9–0	2–0	1–3	1–2	1–1	1–1
Desborough Town	2–1	0–3	3–1	2–1	0–1		3–0	0–1	3–4	0–1	5–0	0–2	2–0	0–3	3–1	2–2	1–2	2–6	1–1	4–0	1–2
Harborough Town	0–0	2–1	1–4	1–2	1–2	1–3		1–4	2–1	5–2	1–1	1–0	1–1	1–7	0–0	1–2	1–5	1–3	2–0	0–0	1–1
Holbeach United	3–1	2–1	0–0	1–0	3–3	5–1	6–1		1–2	5–1	5–1	1–0	4–1	4–1	3–1	8–0	2–1	2–2	3–0	4–0	1–0
Huntingdon Town	5–1	2–2	1–0	2–1	1–0	3–0	2–1	1–6		4–1	4–0	4–3	2–2	1–2	4–5	4–0	1–1	0–5	5–0	8–1	4–2
Irchester United	1–1	1–3	4–5	1–6	1–7	2–1	1–2	0–1	2–3		2–3	1–4	1–2	0–5	1–4	0–4	1–11	0–7	0–2	1–3	0–2
Long Buckby	1–3	3–0	1–2	3–3	0–1	1–1	2–1	0–6	2–2	6–1		1–0	1–0	0–2	0–5	1–3	2–3	1–1	1–1	2–0	3–2
Newport Pagnell Town	2–1	5–1	3–2	1–3	2–8	3–2	2–1	1–2	3–1	4–1	3–0		1–1	1–1	2–0	2–0	1–4	1–1	4–0	2–3	3–1
Peterborough Northern Star	2–0	2–0	0–1	3–4	1–3	5–3	1–3	1–3	0–3	2–0	1–2	2–3		3–1	1–1	2–1	0–3	2–1	2–1	4–2	1–1
Quorn	2–0	2–3	3–1	3–0	1–1	3–1	2–2	0–2	0–2	8–2	2–0	2–2	6–2		0–0	5–2	1–2	2–2	4–1	1–0	1–0
Shepshed Dynamo	4–0	4–0	3–2	1–1	2–3	2–3	3–0	2–2	6–2	4–1	3–3	1–1	1–1	1–0		2–1	1–2	0–1	1–2	3–4	5–1
Sleaford Town	2–1	1–2	1–2	1–2	0–2	2–2	1–3	0–2	1–3	3–1	1–0	1–2	1–1	3–0	2–1		1–1	0–3	2–0	0–2	1–2
Spalding United	4–2	5–1	4–0	5–1	1–0	2–1	7–1	1–3	4–2	2–0	2–1	4–1	1–0	3–2	3–0	5–1		1–3	5–0	5–2	1–0
St Ives Town	6–2	8–3	4–2	2–0	1–1	0–0	8–1	2–0	1–2	4–1	0–0	1–3	3–1	1–3	2–0	2–1	1–1		4–0	5–0	2–2
Stewarts & Lloyds Corby	2–1	0–3	3–0	0–1	1–1	1–1	3–4	1–1	2–4	1–1	1–2	3–2	3–1	1–1	0–1	1–1	2–0	3–5		1–1	2–4
Wellingborough Town	2–0	2–0	0–3	2–2	2–2	1–3	2–0	1–5	1–3	1–0	2–4	0–2	3–0	0–0	0–3	3–0	2–1	0–3	2–3		1–2
Yaxley	1–3	3–3	1–1	3–1	1–4	0–1	4–3	0–2	0–2	2–1	3–2	1–4	0–0	1–0	3–3		2–2	0–1	2–3	1–1	

Source: FA Full-Time, (mitoo).
Legend: Blue = home team win; Yellow = draw; Red = away team win.

== Division One ==
United Counties League Division One
- Season: 2012–13
- Champions: Northampton Sileby Rangers
- Promoted: Northampton Sileby Rangers; AFC Rushden & Diamonds
- Matches: 342
- Goals: 1,264 (3.7 per match)

Division One featured 14 clubs which competed in the division last season, along with five new clubs:

- AFC Rushden & Diamonds, a new club formed after Rushden & Diamonds folded
- Harrowby United, a re-formed club
- Northampton Spencer, voluntarily demoted from the Premier Division
- Oadby Town, transferred from the East Midlands Counties League
- Thrapston Town, relegated from the Premier Division

=== League table ===
Pos	Team	Pld	W	D	L	GF	GA	GD	Pts	Promotion or relegation
1	Northampton Sileby Rangers	36	30	2	4	105	31	+74	92	Promoted to the Premier Division
2	AFC Rushden & Diamonds	36	28	6	2	96	31	+65	90	Promoted to the Premier Division
3	Eynesbury Rovers	36	26	7	3	109	41	+68	85	
4	Oadby Town	36	26	6	4	112	35	+77	84	
5	Northampton Spencer	36	22	5	9	86	54	+32	71	
6	Harrowby United	36	19	4	13	84	58	+26	61	
7	Bugbrooke St Michaels	36	18	5	13	77	62	+15	59	
8	Rushden & Higham United	36	17	4	15	62	56	+6	55	
9	Olney Town	36	14	4	18	56	62	−6	46	
10	Bourne Town	36	10	11	15	67	71	−4	41	
11	Northampton ON Chenecks	36	10	8	18	54	75	−21	38	
12	Thrapston Town	36	10	8	18	69	93	−24	38	
13	Wellingborough Whitworth	36	11	3	22	51	76	−25	36	
14	Raunds Town	36	11	3	22	43	87	−44	36	
15	Buckingham Town	36	10	3	23	62	98	−36	33	
16	Potton United	36	9	4	23	44	70	−26	31	
17	Rothwell Corinthians	36	8	6	22	51	98	−47	30	
18	Wootton Blue Cross	36	7	6	23	48	99	−51	27	Resigned to the Bedfordshire Football League
19	Burton Park Wanderers	36	6	5	25	33	112	−79	23	

Source: fchd
Rules for classification: 1) points; 2) goal difference; 3) number of goals scored.

=== Results ===
Home \ Away	RUS	BOR	BUC	BUG	BPW	EYN	HBY	NOC	NSR	NSP	OAD	OLN	POT	RAU	ROC	RHU	THR	WEW	WBC
AFC Rushden & Diamonds		5–2	3–0	1–1	1–1	2–2	3–2	2–0	2–2	2–1	2–2	1–0	1–0	3–0	2–1	1–0	3–0	4–1	5–0
Bourne Town	1–2		5–0	2–2	1–2	1–1	2–3	2–2	1–3	0–3	2–5	3–4	3–2	2–1	3–3	3–1	3–3	1–3	7–1
Buckingham Town	0–9	3–2		2–4	4–0	2–5	0–6	6–1	0–2	3–2	0–3	1–1	2–5	0–3	5–1	0–2	1–3	5–3	3–1
Bugbrooke St Michaels	0–3	3–2	0–5		6–2	2–1	0–3	1–3	1–3	1–2	0–2	2–0	1–1	4–0	6–2	2–4	3–0	1–2	3–0
Burton Park Wanderers	0–4	1–1	1–4	0–3		2–3	0–6	0–5	1–3	0–3	1–4	2–1	0–2	1–2	1–0	1–7	3–4	1–1	3–3
Eynesbury Rovers	4–1	3–0	4–1	4–2	8–0		1–0	3–4	3–1	4–1	0–1	3–0	1–1	0–0	4–1	1–0	3–1	2–1	5–3
Harrowby United	0–3	2–1	3–2	1–2	5–0	2–2		1–0	2–3	0–2	1–2	0–0	3–2	3–0	6–0	3–0	2–2	4–1	2–0
Northampton ON Chenecks	1–2	0–2	1–1	3–4	3–1	0–9	4–5		0–2	0–1	1–2	1–1	0–2	0–1	4–1	0–0	2–2	4–1	1–1
Northampton Sileby Rangers	0–1	1–0	1–0	3–2	8–0	1–2	2–0	5–0		5–2	2–2	2–0	3–0	2–1	5–1	4–0	3–1	3–2	5–2
Northampton Spencer	0–3	3–0	1–1	1–0	2–1	3–3	3–4	3–0	1–0		3–3	2–0	3–1	2–1	4–2	3–1	2–2	4–2	4–0
Oadby Town	5–1	0–0	4–0	1–1	4–0	2–2	1–2	4–0	0–1	5–1		3–0	8–0	4–0	5–1	2–1	4–2	3–0	4–1
Olney Town	0–1	0–1	6–0	1–3	4–1	0–2	3–2	0–1	1–4	1–4	3–2		4–3	6–2	0–2	1–2	2–4	1–0	3–1
Potton United	0–2	3–3	2–1	2–1	2–0	0–1	1–3	1–0	0–1	0–2	1–3	1–2		2–0	0–2	2–3	2–3	1–1	1–2
Raunds Town	0–4	0–2	2–1	0–2	2–1	1–3	2–1	1–2	0–8	1–5	0–7	2–3	1–0		3–2	0–2	3–1	0–1	6–3
Rothwell Corinthians	2–4	1–1	3–2	1–1	0–1	1–4	2–0	0–3	1–3	1–7	1–3	1–1	4–3	3–3		0–0	1–2	2–5	1–2
Rushden & Higham United	0–4	2–3	2–1	1–2	0–1	2–5	5–1	0–0	0–2	2–1	2–0	2–1	2–0	3–1	0–1		4–3	0–1	4–1
Thrapston Town	1–5	1–3	0–2	2–5	3–3	1–4	4–2	4–4	1–4	1–1	1–3	0–2	2–0	1–3	4–3	2–2		3–1	1–0
Wellingborough Whitworth	1–3	1–1	4–3	0–1	3–0	1–4	1–2	1–2	1–3	1–3	0–5	1–3	0–1	2–0	0–1	2–4	3–1		2–0
Wootton Blue Cross	1–1	1–1	3–1	2–5	0–1	0–3	2–2	3–2	0–5	3–1	2–4	3–1	2–0	1–1	1–2	1–2	2–6	0–1	

Source: FA Full-Time(ChromaSport & Trophies United Counties League)
Legend: Blue = home team win; Yellow = draw; Red = away team win.
