= 2014–15 United Counties League =

The 2014–15 United Counties League season (known as the 2014–15 ChromaSport & Trophies United Counties League for sponsorship reasons) was the 108th in the history of the United Counties League, a football competition in England.

== Premier Division ==
United Counties League Premier Division
- Season: 2014–15
- Champions: AFC Rushden & Diamonds
- Promoted: AFC Rushden & Diamonds
- Relegated: Long Buckby
- Matches: 420
- Goals: 1,616 (3.85 per match)

The Premier Division featured 17 clubs which competed in the division last season, along with four new clubs:

- Eynesbury Rovers, promoted from Division One
- Harrowby United, promoted from Division One
- Oadby Town, promoted from Division One
- Thurnby Nirvana, promoted from the East Midlands Counties League

=== League table ===
Pos	Team	Pld	W	D	L	GF	GA	GD	Pts	Promotion or relegation
1	AFC Rushden & Diamonds	40	31	6	3	121	32	+89	99	Promoted to the Southern Football League
2	Thurnby Nirvana	40	29	4	7	123	61	+62	88 (Note: Both AFC Kempston Rovers and Thurnby Nirvana were each deducted three points for fielding an ineligible player on separate occasions.)	
3	Wisbech Town	40	27	6	7	109	46	+63	87	
4	Holbeach United	40	22	10	8	92	51	+41	76	
5	Yaxley	40	24	4	12	78	43	+35	76	
6	Cogenhoe United	40	23	6	11	77	54	+23	75	
7	Peterborough Northern Star	40	19	9	12	81	67	+14	66	
8	Kempston Rovers	40	20	6	14	76	55	+21	63	
9	Deeping Rangers	40	17	8	15	74	55	+19	59	
10	Newport Pagnell Town	40	18	4	18	78	70	+8	58	
11	Eynesbury Rovers	40	17	6	17	81	69	+12	57	
12	Boston Town	40	15	4	21	71	81	−10	49	
13	Oadby Town	40	14	4	22	74	92	−18	46	
14	Desborough Town	40	13	6	21	62	95	−33	45	
15	Wellingborough Town	40	12	7	21	74	99	−25	43	
16	Huntingdon Town	40	12	5	23	56	96	−40	41	
17	Harrowby United	40	11	6	23	63	102	−39	39	
18	Sleaford Town	40	10	7	23	68	98	−30	37	
19	Northampton Sileby Rangers	40	10	6	24	70	121	−51	34 (Note: Northampton Sileby Rangers were deducted two points for fielding an ineligible player in two games.)	
20	Harborough Town	40	8	6	26	37	111	−74	30	
21	Long Buckby	40	5	6	29	51	118	−67	21	Relegated to Division One

Source: FA Full-Time fchd
Rules for classification: 1) points; 2) goal difference; 3) number of goals scored.

=== Results ===
Home \ Away	KEM	RUS	BOS	COG	DEE	DES	EYN	HAR	HBY	HOL	HUN	LBU	NPT	NSR	OAD	PNS	SLE	THU	WLT	WIS	YAX
Kempston Rovers		1–2	0–2	4–0	1–1	5–1	1–1	3–1	2–2	2–2	2–1	0–1	3–0	2–1	4–0	0–0	4–0	3–1	6–0	0–2	2–0
AFC Rushden & Diamonds	5–1		2–1	3–3	1–0	5–0	3–0	3–0	5–0	1–1	6–1	3–1	2–0	8–1	3–0	2–0	3–0	4–1	7–0	1–1	0–0
Boston Town	1–2	1–2		1–0	1–2	5–1	3–5	2–2	4–1	1–2	2–1	2–0	1–1	4–1	2–4	2–1	2–1	0–1	1–2	1–4	2–3
Cogenhoe United	4–0	1–1	2–1		2–1	1–0	1–2	5–0	6–1	0–3	2–1	2–2	2–1	0–2	0–3	0–2	1–3	0–2	2–1	1–0	2–0
Deeping Rangers	2–1	1–2	1–2	1–3		4–0	1–0	3–0	3–1	3–3	2–0	2–0	1–2	2–1	1–1	1–2	0–0	4–1	3–3	1–1	0–2
Desborough Town	0–2	0–9	2–1	2–2	0–1		5–2	1–1	2–1	2–1	3–0	2–3	0–3	2–3	2–1	1–1	0–4	0–3	2–4	5–1	0–0
Eynesbury Rovers	0–2	1–2	4–0	0–1	1–0	2–3		0–1	5–3	0–2	5–0	3–0	1–0	6–0	1–2	2–2	4–2	1–3	2–2	1–4	3–1
Harborough Town	0–4	1–2	1–5	1–2	1–8	0–1	1–1		2–2	1–5	0–3	2–1	0–4	2–0	3–1	0–2	4–1	1–6	3–2	0–4	1–0
Harrowby United	2–1	1–2	2–1	0–0	3–1	1–1	2–1	2–0		0–7	2–2	3–5	1–1	5–3	3–0	1–5	2–1	1–3	2–0	0–5	1–2
Holbeach United	3–0	1–1	2–2	2–3	4–0	2–1	2–1	1–1	5–1		0–2	3–0	2–1	3–3	3–2	0–4	0–1	2–2	3–1	1–0	1–0
Huntingdon Town	0–3	1–7	0–1	1–0	1–5	3–2	0–3	3–0	2–1	2–3		4–2	0–2	2–1	1–2	1–2	2–2	1–0	2–5	3–2	1–2
Long Buckby	2–3	1–5	1–2	1–3	1–3	0–4	2–3	3–3	0–2	1–1	3–0		1–4	1–1	3–2	2–3	2–2	1–3	2–3	1–4	0–5
Newport Pagnell Town	3–2	1–2	1–1	0–1	4–1	3–2	3–4	2–0	3–1	1–3	3–1	7–1		5–3	1–1	0–2	4–1	0–4	0–1	1–6	2–0
Northampton Sileby Rangers	0–1	1–4	2–3	3–7	0–6	0–3	0–6	4–1	3–1	3–1	2–2	2–1	3–4		4–4	1–2	3–2	3–4	1–1	2–3	0–3
Oadby Town	3–2	2–0	5–1	2–4	0–2	3–4	1–3	4–2	4–2	0–1	1–3	4–1	1–2	1–3		3–6	1–0	2–3	4–2	0–3	1–1
Peterborough Northern Star	1–1	1–4	5–3	1–5	0–0	4–1	1–2	2–0	3–2	1–6	1–1	2–0	1–0	2–3	1–2		9–0	0–0	0–1	2–1	0–4
Sleaford Town	2–3	0–2	5–4	1–1	1–3	2–2	3–1	5–0	2–1	2–5	1–2	1–1	2–5	2–3	3–2	6–1		0–3	1–2	0–2	0–0
Thurnby Nirvana	3–0	2–1	7–1	1–3	2–1	2–1	3–0	5–0	2–1	3–0	3–3	8–1	4–1	6–2	3–1	2–1	7–3		5–4	4–1	2–4
Wellingborough Town	0–2	1–2	0–2	1–3	2–2	1–2	2–2	0–1	2–1	0–5	7–3	3–1	4–2	1–1	1–2	4–4	3–5	2–3		2–3	3–2
Wisbech Town	3–0	1–3	2–0	3–0	2–1	6–1	1–1	7–0	4–1	0–0	2–1	5–1	2–0	5–1	4–1	3–3	1–0	4–4	3–1		2–0
Yaxley	3–0	2–1	1–0	0–2	3–0	3–1	4–1	2–0	2–4	2–1	5–0	3–1	2–1	3–0	4–1	0–1	3–1	3–2	2–0	2–3	

Source: FA Full-Time (ChromaSport & Trophies United Counties League)
Legend: Blue = home team win; Yellow = draw; Red = away team win.

== Division One ==
United Counties League Division One
- Season: 2014–15
- Champions: Northampton Spencer
- Promoted: Northampton Spencer; Rothwell Corinthians
- Matches: 380
- Goals: 1,503 (3.96 per match)

Division One featured 19 clubs which competed in the division last season, along with one new club:

- Stewarts & Lloyds Corby, relegated from the Premier Division

=== League table ===
Pos	Team	Pld	W	D	L	GF	GA	GD	Pts	Promotion
1	Northampton Spencer	38	30	4	4	123	40	+83	94	Promoted to the Premier Division
2	Rothwell Corinthians	38	26	5	7	96	39	+57	83	Promoted to the Premier Division
3	Potton United	38	25	7	6	89	31	+58	82	
4	Lutterworth Athletic	38	26	4	8	85	38	+47	82	
5	Peterborough Sports	38	25	3	10	91	38	+53	78	
6	Northampton ON Chenecks	38	23	6	9	93	49	+44	75	
7	Wellingborough Whitworth	38	21	7	10	107	61	+46	70	
8	Thrapston Town	38	20	6	12	89	61	+28	66	
9	Raunds Town	38	18	7	13	74	62	+12	61	
10	Bourne Town	38	16	6	16	69	76	−7	54	
11	Bugbrooke St Michaels	38	15	8	15	85	77	+8	53	
12	Olney Town	38	15	7	16	77	73	+4	52	
13	Rushden & Higham United	38	14	5	19	62	66	−4	47	
14	Woodford United	38	14	4	20	66	75	−9	46	
15	Irchester United	38	12	4	22	60	102	−42	40	
16	Buckingham Town	38	8	6	24	61	119	−58	30	
17	Blackstones	38	7	5	26	56	98	−42	26	
18	Burton Park Wanderers	38	5	7	26	41	102	−61	22	
19	St Neots Town Saints	38	7	4	27	57	135	−78	14 (Note: St Neots Town Saints were deducted eleven points for fielding an ineligible player.)	
20	Stewarts & Lloyds Corby	38	0	1	37	22	161	−139	1	

Source: FA Full-Time fchd
Rules for classification: 1) points; 2) goal difference; 3) number of goals scored.

=== Results ===
Home \ Away	BLK	BOR	BUC	BUG	BPW	IRC	LUA	NOC	NSP	OLN	PSP	POT	RAU	ROC	RHU	STNS	SLC	THR	WEW	WFU
Blackstones		2–2	2–4	1–7	5–0	6–2	1–2	1–0	1–1	0–5	0–2	0–3	1–4	1–4	5–0	0–0	4–2	0–2	1–6	2–4
Bourne Town	2–1		2–3	3–1	4–2	3–7	1–1	2–2	2–1	3–0	0–3	3–0	4–3	0–3	1–0	5–2	3–1	4–1	0–2	1–2
Buckingham Town	2–1	1–0		1–1	0–1	2–2	1–1	1–4	3–4	2–3	3–4	0–3	0–3	1–3	0–2	0–3	4–1	1–5	2–2	1–2
Bugbrooke St Michaels	2–0	1–1	3–4		1–4	4–1	1–4	2–2	1–4	4–1	1–0	2–5	3–3	1–1	3–1	4–0	4–0	2–3	5–3	2–1
Burton Park Wanderers	1–1	0–1	2–2	1–4		1–3	0–9	0–1	1–2	0–3	0–5	0–4	2–3	0–3	0–2	1–2	6–1	1–2	0–8	4–1
Irchester United	3–2	0–6	3–2	2–2	3–3		2–1	3–2	0–5	1–3	1–0	0–2	1–4	2–5	1–0	4–1	4–3	0–4	2–3	1–4
Lutterworth Athletic	2–1	2–0	3–0	4–2	1–0	3–1		0–2	3–4	7–1	2–1	3–0	1–3	0–0	2–0	1–0	4–0	3–0	0–7	3–0
Northampton ON Chenecks	5–0	5–1	6–2	1–0	6–0	1–0	2–3		1–3	2–2	1–0	2–2	1–1	0–1	5–0	2–1	7–1	4–1	1–2	2–1
Northampton Spencer	4–1	3–2	5–0	4–1	4–3	3–0	2–1	2–0		2–0	4–1	1–1	3–0	3–2	4–0	7–0	6–0	0–2	2–2	6–1
Olney Town	2–1	0–2	1–1	2–1	0–0	2–0	0–1	2–2	1–3		2–3	2–3	2–1	2–3	3–2	8–0	4–0	2–5	3–1	2–2
Peterborough Sports	5–0	2–0	5–3	1–1	3–0	6–0	2–0	2–1	0–1	5–2		0–0	3–0	1–0	0–1	5–0	3–0	3–1	1–1	3–0
Potton United	1–0	5–0	3–0	5–0	4–0	2–0	1–0	1–2	1–2	1–1	1–0		4–1	0–2	0–0	6–0	8–0	1–0	2–3	2–1
Raunds Town	1–0	4–2	3–0	1–3	1–1	3–0	0–3	1–2	1–6	1–0	2–3	1–1		4–2	2–0	5–2	7–1	3–2	0–0	2–1
Rothwell Corinthians	4–2	4–0	6–0	3–2	2–1	3–0	1–2	1–2	2–1	2–0	3–0	1–1	0–0		5–0	9–0	1–0	4–0	1–0	2–0
Rushden & Higham United	1–1	1–2	5–1	1–0	2–2	2–0	0–3	5–2	2–3	1–2	0–3	0–1	2–1	2–2		4–0	7–1	2–3	5–1	1–0
St Neots Town Saints	1–3	2–2	6–1	2–5	0–1	3–2	0–5	2–5	1–3	4–4	2–4	0–2	3–0	1–4	2–3		3–0	3–3	2–6	2–3
Stewarts & Lloyds Corby	1–5	1–3	1–4	1–4	1–1	1–3	0–1	1–2	0–12	1–5	1–7	0–3	0–3	0–1	0–5	2–3		0–2	0–3	0–3
Thrapston Town	6–1	2–0	9–1	1–1	2–0	0–2	0–1	1–3	1–1	2–1	3–2	2–4	0–0	4–3	2–2	3–1	6–0		2–2	3–0
Wellingborough Whitworth	3–2	4–0	7–3	2–4	1–0	2–2	0–1	1–3	1–0	2–0	0–1	2–5	2–0	4–2	2–1	10–1	7–0	3–2		2–2
Woodford United	2–1	2–2	2–5	3–0	5–2	5–2	2–2	0–2	1–2	2–4	1–2	0–1	1–2	2–3	1–0	3–2	3–0	0–2	3–0	

Source: FA Full-Time (ChromaSport & Trophies United Counties League)
Legend: Blue = home team win; Yellow = draw; Red = away team win.
