= 2013–14 United Counties League =

United Counties League
- Season: 2013–14

The 2013–14 United Counties League season (known as the 2013–14 ChromaSport & Trophies United Counties League for sponsorship reasons) was the 107th in the history of the United Counties League, a football competition in England.

== Premier Division ==
United Counties League Premier Division
- Season: 2013–14
- Champions: Spalding United
- Promoted: Spalding United
- Relegated: Stewarts & Lloyds Corby
- Matches: 342
- Goals: 1,233 (3.61 per match)

The Premier Division featured 16 clubs which competed in the division last season, along with three new clubs:

- AFC Rushden & Diamonds, promoted from Division One
- Northampton Sileby Rangers, promoted from Division One
- Wisbech Town, transferred from the Eastern Counties League

Originally Woodford United were relegated from the Southern Football League and placed in the Premier Division, however on the eve of their opening day fixture with Sleaford Town the match was called off and they have dropped down to play in Division One for the season.

=== League table ===
Pos	Team	Pld	W	D	L	GF	GA	GD	Pts	Promotion or relegation
1	Spalding United	36	32	1	3	122	22	+100	97	Promoted to the Northern Premier League Division One South
2	Huntingdon Town	36	26	7	3	105	39	+66	85	
3	AFC Rushden & Diamonds	36	26	3	7	88	35	+53	81	
4	Deeping Rangers	36	23	6	7	113	45	+68	75	
5	Cogenhoe United	36	23	6	7	77	35	+42	75	
6	Yaxley	36	21	5	10	72	41	+31	68	
7	Wisbech Town	36	17	5	14	77	61	+16	56	
8	Wellingborough Town	36	15	7	14	63	54	+9	52	
9	Peterborough Northern Star	36	12	11	13	53	58	−5	47	
10	Desborough Town	36	13	7	16	53	72	−19	46	
11	Holbeach United	36	13	5	18	65	70	−5	44	
12	Kempston Rovers	36	11	11	14	67	86	−19	44	
13	Sleaford Town	36	10	6	20	53	75	−22	36	
14	Boston Town	36	8	10	18	42	68	−26	34	
15	Northampton Sileby Rangers	36	7	7	22	42	98	−56	28	
16	Newport Pagnell Town	36	7	6	23	41	85	−44	27	
17	Harborough Town	36	7	5	24	29	81	−52	26	
18	Long Buckby	36	7	9	20	46	89	−43	24 (Note: Long Buckby were deducted six points for fielding a player who was under county FA suspension.)	
19	Stewarts & Lloyds Corby	36	3	5	28	27	121	−94	14	Relegated to Division One

Source: FA Full-Time fchd
Rules for classification: 1) points; 2) goal difference; 3) number of goals scored.

=== Results ===
Home \ Away	KEM	RUS	BOS	COG	DEE	DES	HAR	HOL	HUN	LBU	NPT	NSR	PNS	SLE	SPA	SLC	WLT	WIS	YAX
Kempston Rovers		1–3	1–1	2–3	0–3	4–3	4–1	5–3	3–8	1–0	1–1	6–2	2–2	2–0	1–8	4–4	1–1	1–1	1–1
AFC Rushden & Diamonds	3–0		1–0	4–2	1–2	1–2	3–1	3–1	1–2	4–1	2–1	4–0	2–3	5–1	1–2	3–0	4–1	2–1	1–0
Boston Town	1–2	2–1		1–3	2–2	1–1	5–1	0–2	0–5	0–1	0–0	4–0	1–2	2–1	0–3	1–0	0–1	1–0	0–4
Cogenhoe United	2–1	0–0	1–0		0–0	3–1	4–0	1–0	2–1	1–2	3–2	6–1	1–2	2–1	2–5	1–0	0–0	6–1	3–0
Deeping Rangers	6–3	2–3	1–1	0–2		5–1	2–0	4–0	1–1	6–1	4–0	3–1	1–1	2–0	1–2	4–0	3–0	4–1	2–2
Desborough Town	1–1	0–2	2–0	0–2	1–8		2–0	2–1	1–1	3–2	1–3	2–0	0–1	2–1	2–6	2–4	2–3	3–0	2–4
Harborough Town	1–0	0–6	1–3	1–2	1–2	0–2		2–2	0–4	1–1	1–0	0–2	2–1	1–0	0–4	1–0	0–2	0–3	0–2
Holbeach United	3–0	1–3	2–2	0–1	2–3	2–1	3–2		2–3	5–0	3–1	5–2	1–1	5–0	0–5	3–0	4–2	0–4	0–3
Huntingdon Town	6–2	1–0	2–1	1–1	2–1	1–1	3–0	2–1		5–1	3–0	3–2	4–0	2–1	2–0	8–1	2–3	3–2	1–0
Long Buckby	3–3	0–1	1–0	0–3	2–7	0–0	2–0	1–4	1–2		6–1	1–1	1–1	1–3	0–5	4–4	1–1	5–1	0–2
Newport Pagnell Town	0–1	1–2	0–0	0–4	3–8	3–3	1–1	4–1	0–2	3–2		1–0	3–2	0–1	0–3	0–0	1–0	1–2	2–3
Northampton Sileby Rangers	1–2	1–7	2–1	2–1	0–7	2–4	3–2	1–1	2–2	3–0	3–0		0–4	2–2	0–6	1–1	0–5	1–3	0–3
Peterborough Northern Star	0–0	1–1	3–2	2–0	0–4	1–2	0–0	2–3	3–2	0–0	3–0	1–1		2–3	0–2	3–2	1–1	0–4	0–1
Sleaford Town	1–2	1–2	1–1	0–0	2–8	1–1	2–3	2–0	2–3	3–3	4–2	2–1	3–3		1–2	3–0	3–1	2–4	0–3
Spalding United	4–2	1–2	12–0	1–0	3–0	3–0	4–0	2–0	1–2	2–0	4–0	3–1	2–0	3–0		4–0	1–0	2–0	2–1
Stewarts & Lloyds Corby	1–6	0–3	0–4	1–9	1–3	0–1	1–3	1–1	0–9	1–2	0–5	1–0	0–2	0–2	0–7		2–1	1–6	0–3
Wellingborough Town	3–0	1–4	6–2	1–2	2–1	1–2	2–2	2–1	1–1	6–0	3–1	1–1	3–2	1–0	2–3	1–0		1–3	1–2
Wisbech Town	4–1	1–1	1–1	1–1	1–2	3–0	2–0	0–2	0–4	4–1	3–1	4–1	2–1	3–4	1–1	7–0	1–3		1–3
Yaxley	1–1	1–2	2–2	1–3	3–1	2–0	2–1	3–1	2–2	2–0	6–0	0–2	2–3	1–0	1–4	4–1	1–0	1–2	

Source: FA Full-Time(ChromaSport & Trophies United Counties League)
Legend: Blue = home team win; Yellow = draw; Red = away team win.

== Division One ==
United Counties League Division One
- Season: 2013–14
- Champions: Oadby Town
- Promoted: Eynesbury Rovers; Harrowby United; Oadby Town
- Matches: 462
- Goals: 1,753 (3.79 per match)

Division One featured 16 clubs which competed in the division last season, along with six new clubs:

- Blackstones, relegated from the Premier Division
- Irchester United, relegated from the Premier Division
- Lutterworth Athletic, transferred from the East Midlands Counties League
- Peterborough Sports, promoted from the Peterborough and District Football League
- St Neots Town Saints, a newly formed club
- Woodford United, demoted from the Southern Football League

=== League table ===
Pos	Team	Pld	W	D	L	GF	GA	GD	Pts	Promotion
1	Oadby Town	42	34	7	1	159	37	+122	109	Promoted to the Premier Division
2	Eynesbury Rovers	42	31	5	6	118	41	+77	98	Promoted to the Premier Division
3	Harrowby United	42	28	8	6	115	53	+62	92	Promoted to the Premier Division
4	Northampton Spencer	42	23	10	9	82	42	+40	79	
5	Lutterworth Athletic	42	25	3	14	90	65	+25	75 (Note: Lutterworth Athletic were deducted three points.)	
6	Northampton ON Chenecks	42	21	10	11	90	64	+26	73	
7	Olney Town	42	20	7	15	86	68	+18	64 (Note: Olney Town were deducted three points.)	
8	Burton Park Wanderers	42	18	10	14	78	61	+17	64	
9	St Neots Town Saints	42	17	10	15	81	66	+15	61	
10	Potton United	42	18	7	17	82	78	+4	61	
11	Buckingham Town	42	18	7	17	59	76	−17	61	
12	Raunds Town	42	15	13	14	60	59	+1	58	
13	Thrapston Town	42	16	9	17	81	84	−3	57	
14	Rushden & Higham United	42	13	12	17	65	60	+5	51	
15	Rothwell Corinthians	42	12	9	21	68	88	−20	45	
16	Peterborough Sports	42	11	11	20	82	82	0	44	
17	Wellingborough Whitworth	42	12	8	22	78	89	−11	44	
18	Bugbrooke St Michaels	42	13	3	26	75	102	−27	42	
19	Irchester United	42	11	9	22	49	87	−38	42	
20	Blackstones	42	12	5	25	66	102	−36	41	
21	Bourne Town	42	8	7	27	66	126	−60	31	
22	Woodford United	42	1	0	41	23	223	−200	3	

Source: FA Full-Time fchd
Rules for classification: 1) points; 2) goal difference; 3) number of goals scored.

=== Results ===
Home \ Away	BLK	BOR	BUC	BUG	BPW	EYN	HBY	IRC	LUA	NOC	NSP	OAD	OLN	PSP	POT	RAU	ROC	RHU	STNS	THR	WEW	WFU
Blackstones		1–1	3–1	0–2	0–5	1–4	2–4	1–2	2–0	0–4	0–2	0–2	1–2	3–3	0–3	3–1	1–2	2–1	2–3	1–4	5–3	1–2
Bourne Town	5–5		4–2	0–1	0–0	0–2	0–3	5–3	1–3	1–3	2–5	2–4	3–3	2–6	0–2	2–2	1–2	0–0	2–3	1–1	3–5	4–2
Buckingham Town	3–0	4–0		1–0	2–0	0–3	0–3	2–1	1–2	2–2	0–3	2–4	2–1	0–2	1–4	1–1	2–0	1–1	3–1	2–1	0–0	2–0
Bugbrooke St Michaels	5–2	0–5	3–4		1–2	2–1	1–3	2–1	2–3	3–1	1–2	1–8	1–2	1–5	2–1	2–3	3–3	1–4	3–0	1–2	3–0	7–1
Burton Park Wanderers	0–1	4–2	0–1	1–0		1–1	2–3	2–1	3–1	1–1	0–0	3–2	3–1	1–0	2–4	1–1	0–1	0–3	4–4	2–2	0–1	4–1
Eynesbury Rovers	7–1	4–0	1–1	2–0	0–1		2–2	2–0	2–1	4–1	3–2	1–2	2–0	2–1	4–1	4–1	5–1	3–0	5–0	2–0	3–1	6–0
Harrowby United	5–1	6–2	7–2	5–0	1–0	0–2		2–2	1–2	1–1	0–1	2–2	4–3	5–2	3–1	4–1	2–1	1–1	0–0	2–1	4–1	4–0
Irchester United	0–3	1–2	0–2	1–1	2–1	1–4	0–1		1–4	3–3	0–3	2–2	2–1	4–2	2–3	0–4	1–1	2–1	0–1	2–1	1–1	1–0
Lutterworth Athletic	4–1	3–1	2–1	3–1	0–2	1–3	1–4	2–3		5–1	1–2	3–6	0–4	0–0	3–1	2–1	2–0	2–2	3–0	0–1	2–0	8–0
Northampton ON Chenecks	2–1	1–2	2–1	3–2	0–1	4–1	0–2	2–0	2–1		1–1	0–1	0–2	1–0	3–2	3–2	2–2	1–1	2–0	1–1	2–0	6–0
Northampton Spencer	2–0	2–0	4–0	2–0	0–2	1–3	1–3	1–1	5–1	0–2		0–1	3–0	1–1	1–0	1–0	4–2	0–0	5–0	2–0	1–0	3–1
Oadby Town	2–2	10–0	9–1	6–2	8–0	3–0	1–1	9–0	4–0	6–1	3–0		4–0	2–1	5–1	2–0	3–0	2–2	1–1	5–1	2–0	3–0
Olney Town	2–4	3–1	0–2	3–2	1–0	0–5	2–0	1–2	1–2	2–0	1–3	2–3		2–2	3–1	2–2	1–1	2–1	1–0	5–1	1–3	7–0
Peterborough Sports	0–2	1–0	3–0	2–4	3–2	1–2	1–2	1–2	0–3	3–3	2–4	1–4	2–3		2–2	3–2	2–2	0–0	1–3	5–1	1–1	9–0
Potton United	2–0	5–3	4–1	0–2	1–3	2–2	2–2	2–0	1–2	3–4	1–0	2–5	1–1	3–0		2–2	2–1	1–3	0–3	2–1	3–1	4–1
Raunds Town	2–1	4–1	0–0	2–0	0–0	0–4	0–1	1–0	1–2	0–3	2–1	0–0	0–0	1–1	1–0		2–1	2–1	1–1	2–1	2–1	1–0
Rothwell Corinthians	3–4	4–1	1–2	4–2	0–4	0–0	6–2	1–1	1–4	0–6	1–1	0–2	2–2	1–3	0–2	0–3		6–3	0–2	1–4	1–2	4–1
Rushden & Higham United	1–0	1–0	1–2	5–3	1–1	0–1	1–4	3–1	0–1	2–2	2–2	2–0	0–3	3–2	1–1	2–0	0–1		0–2	0–2	1–2	5–0
St Neots Town Saints	1–3	6–2	0–2	2–2	6–2	2–1	3–6	2–0	0–0	1–3	1–1	0–1	0–1	0–0	6–1	1–1	1–2	2–1		0–0	3–0	5–0
Thrapston Town	4–0	7–1	1–1	3–0	2–2	2–5	2–1	3–0	0–4	2–1	1–1	0–8	1–6	5–1	0–3	2–2	0–3	0–4	2–1		2–2	10–1
Wellingborough Whitworth	1–1	0–1	2–1	2–1	2–3	3–7	0–3	2–2	2–3	2–3	3–3	1–2	1–3	3–2	2–2	3–1	1–0	0–1	2–6	1–2		16–0
Woodford United	0–5	2–3	0–1	2–5	0–13	1–3	0–6	0–1	1–4	0–7	0–6	2–8	1–6	0–5	0–4	0–6	2–6	0–6	0–8	0–5	2–5	

Source: FA Full-Time(ChromaSport & Trophies United Counties League)
Legend: Blue = home team win; Yellow = draw; Red = away team win.
