= 1999–2000 United Counties League =

The 1999–2000 United Counties League season was the 93rd in the history of the United Counties League, a football competition in England.

== Premier Division ==
United Counties League Premier Division
- Season: 1999–2000
- Champions: Ford Sports Daventry
- Matches: 380
- Goals: 1,342 (3.53 per match)

The Premier Division featured 19 clubs which competed in the division last season, along with one new club, promoted from Division One:

- Bugbrooke St Michaels

=== League table ===
Pos	Team	Pld	W	D	L	GF	GA	GD	Pts
1	Ford Sports Daventry	38	28	7	3	80	25	+55	91
2	Cogenhoe United	38	27	6	5	135	39	+96	87
3	Boston Town	38	27	6	5	88	30	+58	87
4	Stotfold	38	24	7	7	70	24	+46	79
5	Northampton Spencer	38	23	6	9	96	48	+48	75
6	Blackstones	38	23	5	10	79	53	+26	74
7	Kempston Rovers	38	20	10	8	70	38	+32	70
8	Desborough Town	38	21	6	11	95	55	+40	69
9	Stewarts & Lloyds Corby	38	20	3	15	86	70	+16	63
10	Bugbrooke St Michaels	38	18	3	17	53	50	+3	57
11	Wootton Blue Cross	38	15	7	16	81	63	+18	52
12	Bourne Town	38	15	4	19	60	52	+8	49
13	St. Neots Town	38	13	5	20	61	60	+1	44
14	Yaxley	38	10	7	21	43	60	−17	37
15	Wellingborough Town	38	11	4	23	49	81	−32	37
16	Holbeach United	38	10	5	23	48	71	−23	35
17	Eynesbury Rovers	38	9	2	27	45	120	−75	29
18	Potton United	38	6	6	26	47	97	−50	24
19	Buckingham Town	38	5	1	32	27	172	−145	16
20	Long Buckby	38	3	4	31	29	134	−105	13

Source: fchd
Rules for classification: 1) points; 2) goal difference; 3) number of goals scored.

== Division One ==
United Counties League Division One
- Season: 1999–2000
- Champions: Cottingham
- Matches: 306
- Goals: 1,078 (3.52 per match)

Division One featured 17 clubs which competed in the division last season, along with one new club:

- Deeping Rangers, joined from the Peterborough and District League

=== League table ===
Pos	Team	Pld	W	D	L	GF	GA	GD	Pts
1	Cottingham	34	21	8	5	90	33	+57	71
2	Thrapston Town	34	21	5	8	83	38	+45	68
3	Deeping Rangers	34	18	13	3	73	28	+45	67
4	Harrowby United	34	18	11	5	84	31	+53	65
5	Daventry Town	34	19	7	8	70	36	+34	64
6	St Ives Town	34	16	7	11	74	46	+28	55
7	Newport Pagnell Town	34	15	7	12	69	56	+13	52
8	Blisworth	34	14	9	11	57	51	+6	51
9	Olney Town	34	15	5	14	61	57	+4	50
10	Woodford United	34	15	5	14	71	73	−2	50
11	Burton Park Wanderers	34	13	9	12	57	50	+7	48
12	Northampton Vanaid	34	13	9	12	57	52	+5	48
13	Rothwell Corinthians	34	9	11	14	46	69	−23	38
14	Wellingborough Whitworth	34	10	6	18	46	74	−28	36
15	Northampton ON Chenecks	34	8	5	21	46	88	−42	29
16	Sharnbrook	34	6	6	22	33	96	−63	24
17	Higham Town	34	4	8	22	35	104	−69	20
18	Irchester United	34	4	3	27	26	96	−70	15

Source: fchd
Rules for classification: 1) points; 2) goal difference; 3) number of goals scored.
