= Northamptonshire Football Association =

Governing body of association football in Northamptonshire

- Northamptonshire FA logo
- Location: Moulton Park, Northampton
- Coordinates: 52.278443°N 0.879350°W
- CEO: Luke Scott & Kirsty Clarke
- Website: www.northamptonshirefa.com

The Northamptonshire Football Association, also simply known as the Northamptonshire FA, is the governing body of football in the English county of Northamptonshire.

== Organisation ==
The purpose of the Northamptonshire FA is to lead the successful development of football within the county and to increase the participation, quality and enjoyment of football.

The Northamptonshire FA's strategy sets out the vision, key priorities and targets for investment into grassroots football from 1 July 2008 until 30 June 2012. The strategy contributes to the delivery of The FA's National Game Strategy over a four-year period.

The Northamptonshire FA football development team provide support and guidance to aid development in the game, whatever an organisation or person's role may be. Whereas the football governance team are involved in the day to day running of key areas such as the administration of clubs, leagues and referees along with the running of the discipline process, county competitions and the representative teams.

== Affiliated Leagues ==
=== Men's Saturday Leagues ===
- United Counties League**
- Peterborough and District League**
- Northamptonshire Combination Football League**
- Northampton Town Football League**

Footnote: **Part of the English football league system.

=== Men's Sunday Leagues ===
- Daventry & District Sunday League
- Kettering Area Sunday League
- Northants Sunday Combination
- Northants Sunday Conference
- Peterborough & District Sunday League]
- Peterborough Sunday Morning League
- Rushden & District Sunday League

=== Ladies and Girls Leagues ===
- Northamptonshire Women's and Girls' Football League

=== Youth Leagues ===
- Countywide U18 Football League
- Kettering Weetabix Youth League
- Northampton & District Youth Alliance
- Northants Senior Youth League
- Peterborough & District Junior Alliance
- Peterborough & District Youth League
- Peterborough Mini-Soccer Conference League

=== Other Leagues ===
- Northamptonshire Disability League

=== Small Sided Leagues ===
- Champion Soccer
- Football Mundial
- Ladies Leagues
- Robert Windle Tournaments

=== Futsal Leagues ===
- Northamptonshire FA Youth Futsal League

== Disbanded or Amalgamated Leagues ==
A number of leagues that were affiliated to the Northamptonshire FA have disbanded or amalgamated with other leagues including:

- Central Northants Combination (in 1991 became the Northamptonshire Combination League)
- Central Village League (merged with the Mid Northants League in 1953 to become the Northamptonshire Combination League)
- East Northants League (later known as the Rushden & District League)
- Kettering Amateur League (became the East Midlands Alliance)
- Mid Northants League (merged with the Central Village League in 1953 to become the Northamptonshire Combination League)
- Northamptonshire League (abbreviated Northants League and eventually became the United Counties League)
- Rushden & District League (previously known as the East Northants League)
- South East Northants League

== Affiliated Member Clubs ==
Among the notable clubs that are (or were at one time) affiliated to the Northamptonshire FA are:

Football League:
- Peterborough United
- Northampton Town

Step 2:

- Brackley Town
- Peterborough Sports

Step 3:

- Kettering Town

Step 4:

- Corby Town
- AFC Rushden & Diamonds
- Wellingborough Town

Step 5:

- Cogenhoe United
- Daventry Town
- Desborough Town
- Northampton ON Chenecks
- Northampton Sileby Rangers
- Rothwell Corinthians
- Wellingborough Whitworth

Step 6:

- Bugbrooke St. Michaels
- Burton Park Wanderers
- Irchester United
- Long Buckby
- Raunds Town
- Rushden & Higham United
- Stewarts & Lloyds Corby
- Thrapston Town

Step 7:

- James King Blisworth
- Woodford United

Defunct Clubs:

- Daventry United (formerly Ford Sports Daventry)
- Irthlingborough Diamonds (became Rushden & Diamonds)
- Northampton Spencer
- Rothwell Town
- Rushden & Diamonds
- Rushden Town (became Rushden & Diamonds)

Other member clubs include:

- AFC Wombles
- Brixworth All Saints
- Burton United
- Clipston
- Cold Ashby Rovers
- Corby Eagles
- Corby Everards
- Corby Hellenic Fisher
- Corby Khalsa
- Corby Kingswood
- Corby Locomotives
- Corby Morton Vikings
- Corby Pegasus
- Corby Redstar
- Corby Strip Mills
- Corby United
- Cripps
- CSV United
- Dainite Sports
- Daventry Comms
- Daventry Drayton Grange
- Delapre Old Boys
- Denton
- Earls Barton United
- FC Crispin
- FC Higham
- Ferrers
- Finedon Volta
- Great Doddington
- Gretton
- Harpole
- Heyford Athletic
- Higham Town
- Hillmorton
- Hometech
- Islip United
- Kettering Ise Lodge
- Kettering Nomads
- Kettering Ochard Park United
- Kettering Orchard Park
- Kettering Panthers
- Kettering Park Rovers
- Kettering Weekley Eagles
- Kislingbury
- Medbourne
- Mereway United
- Milton
- Moulton
- Northampton Exiles
- Northampton Harlequins
- Northamptonshire Police
- Obelisk United
- Oundle Town
- Ringstead Rangers
- Ristee Towers
- Roade FC
- Rosebery
- SPA
- Spinney Hill
- Spratton
- Stanion United
- Stanwick Rovers
- Swan and Helmet FC
- Thorplands Club
- Thorplands United
- Walgrave Amber
- Weedon
- Weldon United
- Welford Victoria
- Wellingborough Old Grammarians
- Wellingborough Ranelagh
- Wellingborough Rising Sun
- Wellingborough Saxon
- West Haddon
- Wilbarston
- Wilby
- Wollaston Victoria
- Wootton St. George

== County Cup Competitions ==
The Northamptonshire FA run the following Cup Competitions:

- Northamptonshire Cup (The Maunsell Cup)
- Northamptonshire Senior Cup (The Hillier Senior Cup)
- Northamptonshire Junior Cup (The Les Underwood Junior Cup)
- Northamptonshire Lower Junior Cup
- Northamptonshire Area Cup (The Twenty10 Digital Area Cup)
- Northamptonshire Sunday Cup
- Northamptonshire Sunday Trophy
- Northamptonshire Sunday Vase
- Northamptonshire Sunday Shield
- Northamptonshire Veterans Cup
- Northamptonshire Women's Cup
- Northamptonshire Boys U18 Cup
- Northamptonshire Boys U16 Invitation Cup
- Northamptonshire Boys U14 Invitation Cup
- Northamptonshire Boys U12 Invitation Cup
- Northamptonshire Girls U16 Invitation Tesco Cup
- Northamptonshire Girls U14 Invitation Tesco Cup

== Northamptonshire Cup ==
The Northamptonshire Cup (known as The Maunsell Cup) is a county cup competition involving senior teams affiliated to the Northamptonshire Football Association.

== Northamptonshire Senior Cup ==
The Northamptonshire Senior Cup (renamed The Hillier Senior Cup in 1981) is a county cup competition involving senior teams affiliated to the Northamptonshire Football Association.

== List of Northamptonshire Junior Cup Winners ==
Year	Northamptonshire Junior Cup Winners
1889–90	Finedon Revellers
1890–91	Raunds Unity
1891–92	No Record
1892–93	Rushden Reserves
1893–94	No Record
1894–95	Rushden Reserves
1895–96	Rushden Reserves
1896–97	No Record
1897–98	Kettering Reserves
1898–99	Daventry United
1899–1900	Rothwell Reserves
1900–01	Desborough Town
1901–02	Rothwell Town
1902–03	Irthlingborough Town
1903–04	Northampton Town Reserves
1904–05	Kettering Town
1905–06	Kettering Town
1906–07	Raunds Town
1907–08	Desborough Town
1908–09	Finedon United
1909–10	Corby Stars
1910–11	Daventry United
1911–12	Peterborough Westwood Works
1912–13	Kettering Town Reserves
1913–14	Walgrave Amber
1915–1919	No competition due to World War I
1919–20	Irthlingborough Town
1920–21	Higham Ferrers
1921–22	Desborough Town Reserves

Year	Northamptonshire Junior Cup Winners
1922–23	Rushden Town Reserves
1923–24	Rushden Town Reserves
1924–25	Walgrave Amber
1925–26	Rushden Town Reserves
1926–27	Desborough Town Reserves
1927–28	Kingsthorpe FC
1928–29	Rushden Town Reserves
1929–30	Irchester United Sports
1930–31	Daventry Town
1931–32	Kettering Town Reserves
1932–33	Kettering Town Reserves
1933–34	Irchester United Sports Reserves
1934–35	Daventry Stead & Simpsons
1935–36	Woodford Stars
1936–37	Duston FC
1937–38	Kettering United
1938–39	Wollaston Victories
1940–1945	No competitions due to World War II
1945–46	Stewarts & Lloyds Reserves
1946–47	Duston United
1947–48	Kislingbury
1948–49	Irchester United
1949–50	Northampton Park
1950–51	Braunston United
1951–52	Northampton Park
1952–53	Northampton Park
1953–54	Northampton Park
1954–55	Northampton Park
1955–56	Deanshanger Athletic

Year	Northamptonshire Junior Cup Winners
1956–57	Brigstock FC
1957–58	Northampton St Georges
1958–59	Northampton K.G.O.B.
1959–60	Northampton K.G.O.B.
1960–61	Daventry Town
1961–62	Northampton St Georges
1962–63	Northampton Spencer
1963–64	Northampton St Georges
1964–65	Kettering Avondale
1965–66	Desborough Town Reserves
1966–67	Northampton Spencer OB
1967–68	Corby Gainsborough
1968–69	Northampton St Georges
1969–70	Long Buckby
1970–71	Long Buckby
1971–72	Northampton Victoria Rangers
1972–73	Peterborough Rovers
1973–74	Towcester Town
1974–75	Northampton Victoria Rangers
1975–76	Irchester United
1976–77	Geddington Montrose Kettering
1977–78	Northampton St Georges
1978–79	Geddington Montrose Kettering
1979–80	Northampton Crusaders
1980–81	Eye United
1981–82	Eye United
1982–83	Raunds Town
1983–84	Cottingham
1984–85	Towcester Town

Year	Northamptonshire Junior Cup Winners
1985–86	Towcester Town
1986–87	Irthlingborough Diamonds Reserves
1987–88	Thrapston Venturas
1988–89	Blisworth
1989–90	Bugbrooke St. Michaels
1990–91	Daventry Town
1991–92	Raunds Town Reserves
1992–93	Raunds Town Reserves
1993–94	Northampton Vanaid
1994–95	Higham Town
1995–96	Wellingborough Whitworth
1996–97	Northampton Vanaid
1997–98	Northampton Vanaid
1998–99	Thrapston Town FC
1999–2000	Cottingham
2000–01	Thrapston Town FC
2001–02	Northampton Sileby Rangers
2002–03	Northampton Sileby Rangers
2003–04	Thrapston Town FC
2004–05	Eye United
2005–06	Wellingborough Town
2006–07	Peterborough Sports FC
2007–08	Rothwell Corinthians
2008–09	Peterborough Northern Star
2009–10	Northampton ON Chenecks
2010–11	Peterborough Northern Star
2011-12	Bugbrooke St Michaels
2012-13	Rushden & Higham United
2013-14	Northampton ON Chenecks
2014-15	Northampton Spencer
2015-16	Peterborough Sports
2016-17	Blisworth
2017-18	Netherton United
2018-19	Kettering Nomads
2019-20	VOID (Covid-19)
2020-21	VOID (Covid-19)
2021-22	Blisworth

== List of Northamptonshire Lower Junior Cup Winners ==
Year	Northamptonshire Lower Junior Cup Winners
1892–93	Rushden Reserves
1893–94	Kettering Victorias
1894–95	Kettering Victorias
1895–96	Rushden III or Yardley Hastings
1896–97	Kettering Revellers
1897–98	Daventry United
1898–99	Finedon Rovers
1899–1900	Broughton Victorias
1900–01	Rothwell Reserves
1901–02	Raunds Reserves
1902–03	Rothwell Reserves
1903–04	Earls Barton Wesleyans
1904–05	Kettering Town Reserves
1905–06	Rushden Fosse
1906–07	Kettering Town Reserves
1907–08	Kettering Working Mens
1908–09	Rothwell Town
1909–10	Higham St Marys
1910–11	Northampton Grafton Excelsior
1911–12	Finedon United
1912–13	Northampton St Peters Albion
1913–14	Rushden Church Institute
1915–1919	No competition due to World War I
1919–20	Bugbrooke
1920–21	Far Cotton United
1921–22	Northampton Spread Eagle
1922–23	Kislingbury F.C.
1923–24	Northampton Mount Pleasant
1924–25	Kettering United Rlymen

Year	Northamptonshire Lower Junior Cup Winners
1925–26	Carthaginians
1926–27	Kettering Morris B.C.
1927–28	Carthaginians
1928–29	Irthlingborough Nomads
1929–30	Burton Latimer St Marys
1930–31	Heyford Athletic
1931–32	Northampton Nelson Athletic
1932–33	Starverton United
1933–34	Harpole F.C.
1934–35	Kettering Miss Butcher's Bible Class
1935–36	Brixworth All Saints
1936–37	Higham Ferrers Adult School
1937–38	Ringstead Rovers
1938–39	Kislingbury F.C.
1940–1945	No competition due to World War II
1945–46	Gayton F.C.
1946–47	Kislingbury F.C.
1947–48	Silverstone B.L.
1948-49	Moulton
1949–50	Cottingham
1950–51	Moulton
1951–52	Kettering Avondale
1952–53	Little Irchester
1953–54	Barby United
1954–55	Brixworth All Saints
1955–56	Staverton F.C.
1956–57	Bugbrooke St. Michaels
1957–58	Kings Sutton
1958–59	Bozeat

Year	Northamptonshire Lower Junior Cup Winners
1959–60	Northampton St Georges
1960–61	Weldon
1961–62	Corby Hearts
1962–63	Woodford United
1963–64	Kings Sutton
1964–65	Desborough Town 'A'
1965–66	Kings Sutton
1966–67	Corby Fuel
1967–68	Eye United
1968–69	Northampton Corinthians
1969–70	Walgrave Amber
1970–71	Walgrave Amber
1971–72	Walgrave Amber
1972–73	Northampton Corinthians
1973–74	Wootton
1974–75	Wootton
1975–76	Heyford Athletic
1976–77	Bugbrooke
1977–78	Thrapston Venturas Reserves
1978–79	Woodford Stars
1979–80	M A S Duston British Timken
1980–81	Duston Magpies
1981–82	Peterborough Mitchell Sports
1982–83	Deanshanger Athletic
1983–84	Cottingham Reserves
1984–85	Peterborough Molins
1985–86	Middleton Cheney
1986–87	Corby FC Fisher
1987–88	Peterborough Baker Perkins Reserves

Year	Northamptonshire Lower Junior Cup Winners
1988–89	Peterborough Mem. Delv
1989–90	Geddington WMC
1990–91	Wellingborough Town Reserves
1991–92	Bugbrooke St. Michaels
1992–93	Wilby
1993–94	Peterborough Brotherhood
1994–95	Peterborough Brotherhood
1995–96	Kingscliffe
1996–97	Ford Sports Daventry Reserves
1997–98	Peterborough Perkins Sports Reserves
1998–99	Stanwick Rovers FC
1999–2000	Kettering Nomads
2000–01	Crick Athletic Corby
2001–02	Rushden Rangers
2002–03	Corby Caladonian Stripmills
2003–04	Corby Hellenic
2004–05	Corby Grampion
2005–06	Bugbrooke St. Michaels Reserves
2006–07	Peterborough Silver
2007–08	Wellingborough Town 2004 Reserves
2008–09	Northampton ON Chenecks Reserves
2009–10	Peterborough Northern Star Reserves
2010–11	Northampton Sileby Rangers
2011-12	Wellingborough Whitworth
2012-13	Bugbrooke St Michaels Reserves
2013-14	Wellingborough Whitworth
2014-15	Northampton Spencer
2015-16	Rushden & Higham
2016-17	Bugbrooke St Michaels Reserves

== List of Northamptonshire Area Cup Winners ==
Year	Northamptonshire Area Cup Cup Winners
1952–53	Towcester Town Reserves
1953–54	Bugbrooke Un Reserves
1954–55	Litchborough United
1955–56	Silverstone B B
1956–57	Northampton Brown Brothers
1957–58	Silverstone B B
1958–59	Blakesley
1959–60	Cold Ashby
1960–61	Clipston Earls
1961–62	Corby United
1962–63	Kings Sutton Reserves
1963–64	Welford Vics
1964–65	Wellingborough United Reserves
1965–66	Kettering Park Wanderers
1966–67	Staverton

Year	Northamptonshire Area Cup Winners
1967–68	West Haddon
1968–69	Northampton Bostrom
1969–70	Northampton Bostrom
1970–71	Pitsford
1971–72	Byfield
1972–73	Yelvertoft
1973–74	Yardley United
1974–75	Corby Avon Cosmetics
1975–76	Peterborough Pearl Assurance
1976–77	M A S Sports
1977–78	Woodford Stars
1978–79	Peterborough Pearl Assurance
1979–80	Peterborough Pearl Assurance
1980–81	Seddon Packaging
1981–82	Corby White Hart

Year	Northamptonshire Area Cup Winners
1982–83	Northampton Sileby Rangers Reserves
1983–84	Peterborough Molins
1984–85	Barton Seagrave
1985–86	Northampton Strollers
1986–87	Peterborough Juventus
1987–88	Peterborough Juventus
1988–89	Northampton Strollers
1989–90	New Duston Athletic
1990–91	Peterborough Thomas Cook Reserves
1991–92	Oundle Town Reserves
1992–93	Peterborough Molins Reserves
1993–94	Potterspury
1994–95	Corby Square Peg
1995–96	Peterborough Silver Jubilee
1996–97	Heyford Athletic Reserves

Year	Northamptonshire Area Cup Winners
1997–98	Peterborough Railway
1998–99	Corby Sporting Lincoln
1999–2000	Long Buckby
2000–01	Stanion United
2001–02	Peterborough Pearl Assurance
2002–03	Peterborough Silver Jubilee Reserves
2003–04	Northampton Queen Eleanor 'A'
2004–05	Wilby
2005–06	Rushden Comer Flag
2006–07	Peterborough Perkins Sports
2007–08	Bugbrooke St. Michaels "B"
2008–09	Oundle Town Reserves
2009–10	Corby Everards
2010–11	Corby Pegasus Reserves
2011-12	Daventry Drayton Grange
