= Northamptonshire Senior Cup =

NFA Hillier Senior Cup
- Flag of Northamptonshire
- Founded: 1883
- Region: Northamptonshire (Northants FA)
- Current champions: Wellingborough Town, (5th title)
- Most championships: Kettering Town, (31 titles)
- Website: Hillier Senior Cup website

The NFA Hillier Senior Cup is a football knockout tournament involving teams from Northamptonshire, England and the surrounding area. It is a County Cup competition of the Northamptonshire Football Association and involves senior non-league teams. It has been contested annually since 1883. Kettering Town have won the cup the most times, lifting the trophy on 31 occasions. The current champions are Wellingborough Town under 21s, who beat Peterborough Sports F.C., Northampton Town Under 21s, Corby Town and Peterborough United Under 23s on their route to the trophy.

== History ==
Initially named the NFA Senior Cup, the tournament was renamed in 1981. It was first held in 1883, and was won by Newport Pagnell Town. The trophy has since been lifted by 24 different sides (not including reserve teams). The winner of the competition now contests the Maunsell Cup against one of Peterborough or Northampton.

In 1988, The tournament went through a re-structure with the English Football League clubs, Peterborough United and Northampton Town being withdrawn from the cup, after the Northamptonshire FA decided to make the competition an all non-league affair. Since then, the competition has been contested by the 14 highest ranked non-league teams from the previous season, within Northamptonshire. The only exception to this rule was when Rushden & Diamonds competed in the competition between 2001-2006, whilst they were in League Two. They were allowed to take part however, after agreeing to field an Under-21s team in the cup during this period.

Since 1998, the final has been held at Sixfields Stadium. In 2022, The Under 18 teams of both Peterborough United and Northampton Town were eligible to enter the competition, marking the first time teams entered from both clubs since 1988.

=== Recent Finals ===
| Year | Winners | Runner-up | Attendance |
|---|---|---|---|
| 2005 | Rothwell Town | Raunds Town | 223 |
| 2006 | Northampton Spencer | Corby Town | 527 |
| 2007 | Rushden & Diamonds | Woodford United | 1,256 |
| 2008 | Rushden & Diamonds | Brackley Town | 1,747 |
| 2009 | Long Buckby | Brackley Town | 248 |
| 2010 | Corby Town | Daventry Town | 584 |
| 2011 | Brackley Town | Corby Town | 767 |
| 2012 | Brackley Town | Corby Town | 780 |
| 2013 | Corby Town | Daventry Town | 686 |
| 2014 | Daventry Town | Cogenhoe United | 314 |
| 2015 | Brackley Town | Peterborough Sports | 608 |
| 2016 | AFC Rushden & Diamonds | Kettering Town | 945 |
| 2017 | Kettering Town | Corby Town | 895 |
| 2018 | Kettering Town | Brackley Town | 873 |
| 2019 | AFC Rushden and Diamonds | Brackley Town | 1,097 |
| 2022 | Peterborough Sports | AFC Rushden and Diamonds | 691 |
| 2023 | Peterborough Sports | Cogenhoe United | 268 |
| 2024 | AFC Rushden and Diamonds | Kettering Town | 1,025 |
| 2025 | Northampton Town Under 21s | Corby Town | 637 |
| 2026 | Wellingborough Town | Peterborough United Under 21s | 408 |

=== All Time Winners ===
| Pos | Winners | Total | Most Recent Win | Notes |
|---|---|---|---|---|
| 1 | Kettering Town | 31 | 2018 | |
| 2 | Northampton Town | 22 | 1987 | Stopped Competing in 1988 |
| 3 | Peterborough United | 21 | 1988 | Stopped Competing in 1988 |
| 4 | Brackley Town | 12 | 2015 | |
| 5 | Corby Town | 11 | 2013 | |
| 6 | Northampton Spencer | 7 | 2006 | Dissolved in 2019 |
| 6 | Daventry Town | 7 | 2014 | |
| 8 | Newport Pagnell Town | 5 | 1963 | |
| 8 | Wellingborough Town | 5 | 2026 | |
| 9 | Desborough Town | 4 | 1954 | |
| 9 | Rushden & Diamonds | 4 | 2008 | Dissolved in 2011 |
| 9 | Long Buckby | 4 | 2009 | |
| 12 | AFC Rushden & Diamonds | 3 | 2024 | |
| 13 | Peterborough Sports | 2 | 2023 | |
| 14 | Rushden Town | 1 | 1924 | Merged in 1992 with Irthlingborough Diamonds |
| 14 | James King Blisworth F.C. | 1 | 1927 | |
| 14 | Moulton F.C. | 1 | 1935 | |
| 14 | Rothwell Corinthians | 1 | 1957 | |
| 14 | Irthlingborough Diamonds | 1 | 1962 | Merged in 1992 with Rushden Town |
| 14 | Northampton Sileby Rangers | 1 | 1976 | |
| 14 | Wellingborough Whitworth | 1 | 1978 | |
| 14 | Raunds Town | 1 | 1997 | |
| 14 | Cogenhoe United | 1 | 2004 | |
| 14 | Rothwell Town | 1 | 2005 | |
| 14 | Northampton Town Under 21s | 1 | 2025 | |
