= 2021–22 Spartan South Midlands Football League =

The 2021–22 season was the 25th in the history of the Spartan South Midlands Football League, a football competition in England. The league operates three divisions, two of which are in covered in this article: the Premier Division at Step 5, and Division One at Step 6 of the English football league system.

The league constitution for this season was based on allocations for Steps 5 and 6 that were announced by The Football Association on 18 May 2021, and were subject to appeal.

After the abandonment of the 2019–20 and 2020–21 seasons due to the COVID-19 pandemic in England, numerous promotions were decided on a points per game basis over the previous two seasons.

== Premier Division ==
Spartan South Midlands Football League Premier Division
- Season: 2021–22
- Champions: New Salamis
- Promoted: Hadley; New Salamis
- Relegated: Holmer Green
- Matches: 380
- Goals: 1,291 (3.4 per match)

The Premier Division featured 13 clubs which competed in the division last season, along with seven new clubs.

- Transferred from the Hellenic League:
  - Ardley United
  - Flackwell Heath
  - Holmer Green
  - Risborough Rangers
- Plus:
  - Hadley, transferred from the Essex Senior League
  - Milton Keynes Irish, promoted from Division One
  - New Salamis, promoted from Division One

Cockfosters, initially allocated to this division from the Essex Senior League, successfully appealed and the transfer was rescinded.

=== League table ===
Pos	Team	Pld	W	D	L	GF	GA	GD	Pts	Promotion, qualification or relegation
1	New Salamis	38	30	4	4	123	36	+87	94	Promoted to the Isthmian League
2	Risborough Rangers	38	29	6	3	101	23	+78	93	Retented at Step 5 (Note: Risborough Rangers failed to meet ground grading standards and were not promoted. Their appeal was unsuccessful.)
3	Hadley	38	25	8	5	78	33	+45	83	Promoted to the Southern League
4	Leighton Town	38	20	11	7	78	42	+36	71	
5	Harpenden Town	38	20	8	10	69	45	+24	68	
6	Flackwell Heath	38	21	5	12	66	42	+24	68	Transferred to the Combined Counties League
7	Ardley United	38	17	9	12	67	45	+22	60	
8	Leverstock Green	38	17	5	16	63	57	+6	56	
9	Dunstable Town	38	14	8	16	50	60	−10	50	
10	Arlesey Town	38	13	8	17	58	77	−19	47	
11	Harefield United	38	12	10	16	70	67	+3	46	Transferred to the Combined Counties League
12	Milton Keynes Irish	38	12	10	16	55	59	−4	46	Transferred to the United Counties League
13	Tring Athletic	38	12	7	19	51	61	−10	43	
14	Aylesbury Vale Dynamos	38	12	7	19	57	85	−28	43	
15	Oxhey Jets	38	12	6	20	60	101	−41	42	Transferred to the Combined Counties League
16	Broadfields United	38	12	1	25	55	81	−26	37	Transferred to the Combined Counties League
17	Baldock Town	38	9	8	21	51	73	−22	35	
18	Crawley Green	38	8	6	24	57	92	−35	30	
19	London Colney	38	9	3	26	38	99	−61	30	Reprieved from relegation (Note: Reprieved as one of 12 clubs with the most PPG out of 16 that were second-from-bottom at Step 5.)
20	Holmer Green	38	7	8	23	44	113	−69	29	Relegated to Division One

Source: The FA Full-Time
Rules for classification: 1) points; 2) goal difference; 3) number of goals scored; 4) number of matches won; 5) head-to-head results

=== Stadia and locations ===
Locations of the Premier Division clubs
Locations of the Premier Division clubs (Hertfordshire)

Team	Stadium	Capacity
Ardley United	The Playing Fields	1,000
Arlesey Town	Hitchin Road	2,920
Baldock Town	Hitchin Road	2,920
Aylesbury Vale Dynamos	Haywood Way	
Broadfields United	Tithe Farm Sports & Social Club (groundshare with Rayners Lane)	1,000
Crawley Green	The Brache	4,000
Dunstable Town	Creasey Park	3,065
Flackwell Heath	Wilks Park	2,000
Hadley	Brickfield Lane	2,000
Harefield United	Preston Park	1,200
Harpenden Town	Rothamsted Park	
Holmer Green	Watchet Lane	
Leighton Town	Bell Close	2,800
Leverstock Green	Pancake Lane	
London Colney	Cotlandswick Park	1,000
Milton Keynes Irish	Manor Fields	1,500
New Salamis	Coles Park (groundshare with Haringey Borough)	3,000
Oxhey Jets	The Boundary Stadium	2,000
Risborough Rangers	The KAMTECH Stadium	1,500
Tring Athletic	Grass Roots Stadium	

== Division One ==
Spartan South Midlands Football League Division One
- Season: 2021–22
- Champions: Stotfold
- Promoted: Shefford Town & Campton; Stotfold
- Relegated: Irchester United
- Matches: 380
- Goals: 1,548 (4.07 per match)

Division One featured nine clubs which competed in the division last season, along with eleven new clubs.

- Transferred from the United Counties League:
  - Burton Park Wanderers
  - Irchester United
  - Northampton Sileby Rangers
  - Raunds Town
  - Rushden & Higham United
  - Wellingborough Whitworth
- Transferred from the Hellenic League:
  - Kidlington reserves
  - Long Crendon
  - Penn & Tylers Green
  - Thame Rangers
- Plus:
  - Letchworth Garden City Eagles, promoted from the Hertfordshire Senior County League

=== League table ===
Pos	Team	Pld	W	D	L	GF	GA	GD	Pts	Promotion, qualification or relegation
1	Stotfold	38	31	3	4	126	31	+95	96	Promoted to the Premier Division
2	Ampthill Town	38	25	8	5	93	52	+41	83	Qualified for the play-offs
3	Winslow United	38	25	5	8	104	40	+64	80	Qualified for the play-offs
4	Shefford Town & Campton	38	26	2	10	115	57	+58	80	Qualified for the play-offs, then promoted to the Premier Division
5	Wellingborough Whitworth	38	24	4	10	114	63	+51	76	Qualified for the play-offs
6	Northampton Sileby Rangers	38	23	4	11	110	66	+44	73	
7	Bedford	38	19	7	12	90	72	+18	63 (Note: Bedford deducted one point for fielding an ineligible player.)	
8	Long Crendon	38	18	5	15	99	75	+24	59	Transferred to the Hellenic League
9	Buckingham Athletic	38	18	4	16	78	57	+21	58	
10	Penn & Tylers Green	38	15	9	14	85	74	+11	54	Transferred to the Combined Counties League
11	Rushden & Higham United	38	15	7	16	61	82	−21	52	
12	Letchworth Garden City Eagles	38	14	7	17	62	67	−5	49	
13	Amersham Town	38	13	5	20	63	83	−20	44	
14	Thame Rangers	38	12	6	20	54	85	−31	42	
15	Langford	38	12	1	25	49	83	−34	37	
16	London Tigers	38	11	4	23	50	97	−47	37	
17	Raunds Town	38	10	6	22	52	99	−47	36	
18	Kidlington reserves	38	9	5	24	53	122	−69	32	Transferred to the Hellenic League
19	Burton Park Wanderers	38	5	6	27	51	128	−77	21	Reprieved from relegation (Note: All third-from-bottom clubs at Step 6 were reprieved from relegation. The top 15 second-from-bottom sides were also reprieved on a PPG basis.)
20	Irchester United	38	4	4	30	39	115	−76	16	Relegated to the Northamptonshire Combination League

Source: The FA Full-Time
Rules for classification: 1) points; 2) goal difference; 3) number of goals scored; 4) number of matches won; 5) head-to-head results

=== Play-offs ===
Semi-finals
2	Ampthill Town	2
5	Wellingborough Whitworth	3
3	Winslow United	0
4	Shefford Town & Campton	2

Final
5	Wellingborough Whitworth	1
4	Shefford Town & Campton	4

==== Semifinals ====
3 May 2022	Ampthill Town	2–3	Wellingborough Whitworth	Ampthill
				Stadium: The ANCO Stadium at Ampthill Park; Attendance: 403

4 May 2022	Winslow United	0–2	Shefford Town & Campton	Winslow
				Stadium: Elmfields Gate; Attendance: 262

==== Final ====
7 May 2022	Shefford Town & Campton	4–1	Wellingborough Whitworth	Shefford
				Stadium: Shefford Sports Club; Attendance: 410

=== Stadia and locations ===
Locations of Division One clubs
Locations of Division One clubs (Bedfordshire)

Team	Stadium	Capacity
Amersham Town	Spratleys Meadow	1,500
London Tigers	Spratleys Meadow	1,500
Ampthill Town	Ampthill Park	1,300
Bedford	McMullen Park	
Buckingham Athletic	Stratford Fields	
Burton Park Wanderers	Latimer Park (groundshare with Kettering Town)	
Irchester United	Alfred Street	1,800
Kidlington reserves	Yarnton Road	1,500
Langford	Forde Park	2,800
Letchworth Garden City Eagles	Pixmore Pitches	
Long Crendon	Marsh Lane (groundshare with Oxford City)	3,100
Northampton Sileby Rangers	Fernie Fields	
Penn & Tylers Green	French School Meadow	900
Raunds Town	Kiln Park	
Rushden & Higham United	Hayden Road	1,500
Shefford Town & Campton	Shefford Sports Club	1,000
Stotfold	The JSJ Stadium	1,500
Thame Rangers	Meadow View Park	2,000
Wellingborough Whitworth	The Victoria Mill Ground	2,140
Winslow United	Elmfields Gate	2,000

== Division Two ==
Spartan South Midlands Football League Division Two
- Season: 2021–22
- Champions: Old Bradwell United
- Matches: 210
- Goals: 821 (3.91 per match)

Division Two featured 13 clubs which competed in the division last season, along with three new club:

- Milton Keynes College Football Academy
- Eynesbury United, joined from the Cambridgeshire County League
- Risborough Rangers development, transferred from the Hellenic League Division Two North

=== League table ===
Pos	Team	Pld	W	D	L	GF	GA	GD	Pts	Promotion
1	Old Bradwell United	28	21	3	4	102	19	+83	66	
2	Aston Clinton	28	22	0	6	72	34	+38	66	
3	Pitstone & Ivinghoe	28	18	6	4	97	47	+50	60	
4	Bovingdon	28	18	5	5	63	24	+39	59	
5	Milton Keynes College Football Academy	28	17	4	7	72	44	+28	55	
6	Eynesbury United	28	17	3	8	66	36	+30	54	
7	Totternhoe	28	15	3	10	47	50	−3	48	
8	New Bradwell St Peter	28	11	4	13	42	49	−7	37	
9	Sarratt	28	9	3	16	43	66	−23	30	
10	Codicote	28	9	2	17	45	64	−19	29	
11	Risborough Rangers development	28	8	1	19	35	57	−22	25	
12	Berkhamsted Raiders	28	6	6	16	37	74	−37	24	
13	Buckingham United	28	7	1	20	44	105	−61	22	
14	The 61	28	5	2	21	26	78	−52	17	
15	Tring Corinthians	28	3	5	20	30	74	−44	14	
16	Berkhamsted Comrades	0	0	0	0	0	0	0	0	Club folded, record expunged

Source: FA Full-Time
Rules for classification: 1) points; 2) goal difference; 3) number of goals scored.

== Step 5 rankings ==
The 10 runners-up with the most points per game (PPG) at Step 5 were automatically promoted after the 2021–22 season. The remaining six played one-off inter-step play-off matches with the six third-from-bottom clubs with the fewest PPG from the eight divisions at Step 4. The winner of each match was promoted to Step 4 for the 2022–23 season, while each loser was relegated to Step 5.

The final points-per-game ranking of the second-placed teams was as follows:

Pos	Team, division	Pld	Pts	PPG	Promotion or qualification
10	Exmouth Town, Western League Premier	36	77	2.139	Promotion to Step 4
11	Newhaven, Southern Combination League Premier	38	80	2.105	Qualification for the inter-step play-offs
12	Eccleshill United, Northern Counties East League Premier	38	79	2.079	Qualification for the inter-step play-offs
13	Saffron Walden Town, Essex Senior League	40	83	2.075	Qualification for the inter-step play-offs
14	Boldmere St Michaels, Midland League Premier	36	74	2.056	Qualification for the inter-step play-offs
15	Skelmersdale United, North West Counties League Premier	40	79	1.975	Qualification for the inter-step play-offs
16	Consett, Northern League One	38	75	1.974	Qualification for the inter-step play-offs

The 12 best second-from-bottom clubs on a PPG basis out of 16 that were at Step 5 were reprieved from relegation. The four worst teams were relegated.

The final points-per-game ranking of the second-from-bottom-placed teams was also as follows:

Pos	Team, division	Pld	Pts	PPG	Qualification or relegation
12	Lordswood, Southern Counties East League Premier	38	24	0.632	Retention at Step 5
13	St Margaretsbury, Essex Senior League	40	25	0.625	Relegation to Step 6
14	Northampton ON Chenecks, United Counties League Premier South	38	20	0.526	Relegation to Step 6
15	Calne Town, Hellenic League Premier	38	19	0.500	Relegation to Step 6
16	Athersley Recreation, Northern Counties East League Premier	38	10	0.263	Relegation to Step 6
