= RCFC =

RCFC may refer to:

- R. Cappellen F.C.
- Resources Capital FC
- Ross County F.C.
- Rothwell Corinthians F.C.
