= AFC Rushden & Diamonds =

Association football club in England

Coordinates: 52°17′28″N 0°35′14″W

- Nickname: The Diamonds
- Founded: 2011; 15 years ago
- Ground: Hayden Road, Rushden
- Capacity: 2,955 (257 seated)
- Chairman: Robert Usher
- Manager: Elliot Sandy
- League: Northern Premier League Division One Midlands
- 2025–26: Northern Premier League Division One Midlands, 12th of 22
- Website: afcdiamonds.com
Home colours	Away colours

A.F.C. Rushden & Diamonds is an English football club based in Rushden in Northamptonshire. They played their opening season at Kiln Park, the home of Raunds Town, in 2011–12 and subsequently shared the Dog & Duck ground with Wellingborough Town from July 2012 to the summer of 2017. A groundshare agreement with Rushden & Higham United was agreed for the 2017–18 season. The club was formed by supporters in July 2011, after Rushden & Diamonds, a former Football League club, were expelled from the Football Conference and liquidated.

At an open meeting chaired by a supporters group called SaveRDFC, a mandate was agreed upon to create a phoenix club, fully owned and controlled by its supporters. A team was created and accepted into the Northants Senior Youth League for the 2011–12 season, while a senior team played in the United Counties Football League Division One for the 2012–13 season. They are currently members of the Northern Premier League Division One Midlands.

== History ==
=== Background ===
The original Rushden & Diamonds was formed on 21 April 1992, following the merger of Irthlingborough Diamonds and Rushden Town. The club's early years were marked by success. Within four seasons the club had reached the Conference National, and within nine the club were members of the Football League. However, following their promotion to Division Two the Diamonds' fortunes took a turn for the worse. The club were relegated twice in three years, and suffered instability off the field. Seven different managers took charge of the team between March 2004 and May 2011, while the club itself was controlled by four different parties during the same period. Following a period of sustained financial difficulties during the 2010–11 season, the club were expelled from the Conference at the end of the campaign, and entered administration that July.

=== Establishment ===
AFC Rushden & Diamonds was created during the summer of 2011 by Rushden & Diamonds fans as a "phoenix club" after the original Diamonds were expelled from the Conference National, and subsequently went on to fail to secure a place in the Southern League Premier Division. After missing the FA league deadline for registering a senior side, AFC R&D formed a youth team to compete in the Northants Senior Youth League for the club's inaugural 2011–12 season, with the intention of fielding a senior side the following year. Following an open fans' meeting, supporters voted to play their games for the 2011–12 season at Kiln Park, Raunds, the home of Raunds Town. Former Rushden & Diamonds head of youth development Mark Starmer was appointed as manager, initially taking control of the Under-18 side. The U18s were accepted into the Northants Senior Youth League for the 2011–12 season, but no senior side was registered in time for that season.

The club's first match was a 3–0 loss to Raunds Town in a friendly youth match played on 6 August 2011, attended by 350 supporters. The first ever competitive goal scored at any level for the new club was a penalty from Lewi Williams in the inaugural match of the Dale Roberts Memorial Cup against Cleveland Juniors at Kiln Park on 14 August 2011. The Diamonds played their first competitive game on 25 August 2011, winning 3–0 against Daventry Town in the Northants Senior Youth League. The side ended the league campaign in fifth place with 30 points from their 16 games, and they won the NYSL Knock-out Cup, beating AFC Kempston Rovers 4–1 in the final held at Corby Town's Steel Park. Throughout the season the club established partnerships with other local clubs which saw money donated to the club, the establishment of a youth development programme, and the acquirement of a playing field and home ground until the end of the 2012–13 season.

Ahead of 2012–13, Mark Starmer was given the First Team Manager role, with ex-Rushden & Diamonds player Andy Peaks appointed as his assistant. The senior team were registered to play in the United Counties Football League Division One, playing its home games at the Dog and Duck, home of Wellingborough Town. A Women's team and a series of Youth teams were also established.

=== Senior football ===
The senior side's first match was a 3–0 victory in a friendly against Crawley Green on 17 July 2012. Striker Peter Okechukwu scored the senior team's first goal, with a crowd of approximately 100 watching the match. A month later, AFC Rushden & Diamonds beat Thrapston Town 3–0 in their first ever competitive senior match, with goals from Alfie Taylor (2) and Jack Wisniewski in front of 784 supporters. The club had mixed form throughout the season, but finished the league in second place, securing promotion to the United Counties League Premier in their first senior season. The club also took part in the FA Vase, United Counties League Knockout Cup and the Northants FA Les Underwood Junior Cup.

In 2013-14 the club entered the FA Cup for the first time. Starting in the competition's Extra Preliminary, they beat London Colney, Northwood, Cockfosters, and Cambridge City to reach the Third Qualifying Round, where they were defeated 3–1 away to Conference South side Dover Athletic. In the league, Rushden & Diamonds finished third.

Diamonds spent most of 2014-15 near the top of the table and, in anticipation, applied for promotion. In a season that included a 6-game winning streak, and 9–0 and 7–0 wins against Desborough Town and landlords Wellingborough Town, respectively, the club secured the United Counties League Premier Division title, their first ever honour, and promotion to the Southern League Division One Central. Diamonds made it a double by beating Potton United 3–0 in the final of the UCL Knockout-Cup.

Ahead of the 2015–16 season the club were informed by the Southern Football League that they must use the previously retired number 1 - retired in honour of Dale Roberts - despite the United Counties League and the Football Association having given the club prior permission. A petition was set up by supporters, and goalkeeper Matt Finlay wore 17 on his shirt in the first game of the season. Further appeals from the club eventually succeeded and the decision was overturned. Away from this, the club's promotion meant that they competed in the FA Trophy for the first time. In the FA Cup, Diamonds reached the Fourth Qualifying Round for the first time, where they lost 1–0 in replay against Barwell. After spending some time at the top of the table, in the league the club finished fifth, qualifying for the play-offs. After beating Royston Town in the semi-final they lost 2–1 in extra time to St Ives Town in the final. The season ended with a 2–1 victory in the Hillier Senior Cup Final against old rivals Kettering Town.

Diamonds were transferred to the Northern Premier League Division One South in 2016–17, where they again finished fifth. They qualified once more for the play-offs, but they were defeated 1–0 by Witton Albion in the semi-final. The FA transferred the club once again, this time back to the Southern League Division One Central.

They had initially planned to start the 2017–18 season playing their home games at Kempston Rovers' ground, ahead of a proposed move to Hayden Road in Rushden, however necessary works to Hayden Road were completed before the season start.

On 28 April 2018 Diamonds were promoted to Step 3 at the third time of asking, finishing second behind Beaconsfield Town; their third promotion in six seasons.

The 2018–19 season saw Diamonds finishing 9th on 61 points, 33 off rivals and league winners Kettering Town.

The 2019–20 season was Diamonds' second at Step 3 and contained notable results such as a 5–1 victory over Leiston and an 8–2 defeat to Bromsgrove Sporting. The season saw short cup runs in both the FA Trophy and the FA Cup, being defeated by South Shields and Enfield Town respectively. When the season was ended due to the COVID-19 pandemic, Diamonds were placed 11th in a very tight league, where they were just 4 points away from the playoff places. The 2022–23 season saw the club relegated from step 3 in their fifth season at the level, a 0–0 draw on 25 March confirming their fate with seven matches remaining.

The 2021/22 season began a tumultuous period for the Club. Manager Andy Peaks had the team looking nailed-on for the play-offs when he departed for league rivals Tamworth after 8 years in charge, with whom he, alongside many former Diamonds players, have gone on to have unprecedented success including back-to-back promotions. Diamonds meanwhile, now under the stewardship of Club Legend Andy Burgess, collapsed on the pitch whilst off it, things weren’t much better.

A wretched period of recruitment in the summer of 2022 left Diamonds propping up the Southern League Premier Division Central and nailed on for relegation with half of the season played. With the club’s attendances plummeting and finances dwindling, an extraordinary general meeting of the Club’s Part Owners was called by the Club’s Board and in November 2022, a new board was formed, tasked initially with fulfilling fixtures and protecting the future of the Club rather than on-pitch success. Relegation at the end of the 2022/23 season was a formality, but under new manager Chris Nunn, there were green shoots of recovery with a strong finish to the season.

The 2023/24 season started with a great deal of optimism however 10-straight defeats at the start of the campaign left the Diamonds firmly rooted to the bottom of the table back at Step 4, out of all cup competitions and managerless once more. Diamonds appointed then-player Michael Harriman alongside Club Legend and all-time top goalscorer Tom Lorraine. The pair would mastermind a phenomenal recovery, dubbed ‘The Great Escape’, in which Diamonds would finish level of points with 4 other clubs. Despite being cruelly relegated on paper on the final day, Diamonds would receive a reprieve following the demise of Loughborough Dynamo, allowing them to remain at Step 4 and thus avoiding back-to-back relegations.

The 2024/25 season was a period of consolidation following three tumultuous campaigns, with the Diamonds finishing the season in mid-table. In the summer of 2025, Michael Harriman departed the club by mutual consent and former player Elliot Sandy was appointed. The 2025/26 season was the club’s most successful since 2021/22 and included the best FA Trophy run in the Club’s history.

In 2026/27 season, the club reached the First Round Proper of the Emirates FA Cup for the first time in their history, beating National League North side Morecambe FC 2-1 at Hayden Road in front of a record crowd of 1,875.

Senior team games are covered by Radio Diamonds, a group of volunteers who broadcast live commentary online for fans via Mixlr.

== Ground ==
The club's initial 2011–12 season was played in the Northants Senior Youth League, and games were played at Kiln Park, Raunds, the home of Raunds Town F.C.

The club's first senior season was in 2012–13, played at the Dog and Duck ground in Wellingborough. This arrangement remained for some years.

On 21 July 2016, Diamonds released a joint-statement with Wellingborough Town, confirming that the Dog & Duck landlord Alper Ozdogan had invoked a clause in Wellingborough's lease agreement, forcing them to leave the ground by 31 May 2017. This effectively brought an end to the current ground share agreement on that date. Diamonds confirmed that they would be seeking an alternative ground share agreement in the local area.

After a vote amongst the club's members, it was agreed to groundshare with Rushden & Higham United at Hayden Road in Rushden, starting from the 2017–18 season and until a new ground would be completed.

In November 2018, an agreement with the Duchy of Lancaster resulted in land being set aside along the B645 Chelveston Road for the construction of facilities to serve the club. This 30-year lease also includes the possibility of expansion into neighbouring areas should the opportunity arise.

After progress on the Chelveston Road site stalled, Diamonds announced in September 2025 that it was actively shaping the future of Slater’s Lodge, a 61-hectare site within the Rushden East development. The location is ideally positioned alongside the proposed secondary school and wider community facilities, offering a rare chance for the Club to secure a meaningful, lasting home.

As of the 2026–27 season, the club still groundshares with Rushden & Higham United.

== Club badge ==
The club badge was voted on by the fans from three possible designs and was unveiled on 9 August 2011 at a fans forum at Kiln Park. It draws heavily upon the original Rushden & Diamonds, Rushden Town and Irthlingborough Diamonds crests. The "Rampant Lion", Crosskeys of Saint Peter's Church, blue diamonds and red stripes all reflect this inspiration.

== Players ==
=== Current squad ===
As of 21 August 2026

Note: Flags indicate national team as defined under FIFA eligibility rules; some limited exceptions apply. Players may hold more than one non-FIFA nationality.

No.	Pos.	Nation	Player
—	GK	ENG	Ben Heath
—	GK	ENG	Charlie Woods
—	DF	ENG	David Adegbola
—	DF	ITA	Sidik Atcha
—	DF	ENG	Sam Brown
—	DF	ENG	Tarik Dallas
—	DF	ENG	Curtis Hartley
—	DF	ENG	Max Prickett-Reed
—	DF	ENG	Tejan Thomas
—	DF	ENG	Jarvis Wilson
—	DF	ENG	Freddie Findlay
—	MF	ENG	Dominic Allen-Ledgeway

No.	Pos.	Nation	Player
—	MF	ENG	Lewis Brooks
—	MF	ENG	Jack Daldy
—	MF	ENG	Jack Maltby-Smith
—	MF	ENG	Joel Nketia
—	MF	IRL	John-Joe O'Toole
—	MF	ENG	Freddie Robinson
—	MF	ENG	Cairo Taylor
—	MF	ENG	Matty Warburton
—	FW	ENG	James Clifton
—	FW	POR	Bruno Andrade
—	FW	ENG	Jordan O'Brien
—	FW	ENG	Rhys Thorpe

The Northern Premier League does not use a squad numbering system.

=== Retired numbers ===
Note: Flags indicate national team as defined under FIFA eligibility rules; some limited exceptions apply. Players may hold more than one non-FIFA nationality.

No.	Pos.	Nation	Player
1	GK	ENG	Dale Roberts – posthumous honour.

=== Player records ===
(as of 3 May 2023)
Records for league and all cups, appearance totals are starting + substitute
Shown are the top 10 players in each category.
Source: 2022-23 Player and Match Stats

Appearances:

#	Player	Career	Appearances
1	Sam Brown	2012 -	351
2	Tom Lorraine	2014–2021	307
3	Liam Dolman	2014–2022	302
4	Brad Harris	2013 - 2018	213
5	Jack Ashton	2014–2020	170
6	Matt Finlay	2014 - 2017	161
7	Ben Farrell	2016–2021	150
8	Ben Heath	2016–2019	148
9	Richard Bunting	2013 - 2018	145
10	Tejan Thomas	2023 -	143

Goals:

#	Player	Career	Appearances	Goals	Goals per game ratio
1	Tom Lorraine	2014 – 2020	307	100	0.33
2	Alfie Taylor	2012 - 2014	77	50	0.65
3	Liam Dolman	2014 – 2021	302	50	0.17
4	Nabil Shariff	2016 - 2020 (2 spells)	91	44	0.48
5	Fazel Koriya	2013 - 2017 (2 spells)	86	38	0.44
6	Matt Gearing	2012 - 2015	115	38	0.33
7	Ben Farrell	2016–2021	150	37	0.25
8	Russ Dunkley	2013 - 2015	74	35	0.47
9	Jake Newman	2012 - 2016 (2 spells)	57	27	0.47
10	Bruno Andrade	2025 -	50	25	0.50

Sam Brown and Alfie Taylor played in the club's first Senior competitive game, on 2012-08-18

== Managers ==
Name	Nationality	From	To	M	W	D	L	Win %
Elliot Sandy	England	2025		48	17	14	17	35.4%
Michael Harriman	England	2023	2025	79	28	17	34	35.4%
Chris Nunn	England	2022	2023	34	5	4	25	14.7%
Richard Maxwell	England	2022	2022	6	2	1	3	33.3%
Andy Burgess	England	2022	2022	23	4	7	12	17.4%
Andy Peaks	England	2014	2022	211	129	36	46	60.8%
Mark Starmer	England	2011	2014	89	63	12	14	70.7%

- Matches include league, league cup, county cup, FA Vase and FA Cup matches.

== Club officials ==
=== Board ===
- Chair: Rob Usher
- Vice-Chair & Commercial Director: Alex Raspin
- Club Secretary: Nikki Roberts
- Society Secretary: Brett Abbott
- Club Welfare Officer: Rob Usher (interim)
- Director: David Kalicki
- Director: Alfie Foster
- Director: Marc Jarrett
- Director: Laura Hales
- Director: Jordan Kirk

=== Club ===
- Community Football Lead: Mark Swindells
- Club Chaplain: Rev. Alan Jenkins

=== Coaching and Medical Staff ===
- Manager: Elliot Sandy
- Assistant Manager: Jim Le Masurier
- Goalkeeping Coach: Nathan Gaunt
- Sports Therapist: Ismae Wainwright
- Head of Academy:
- Foundation Development Phase Lead 6–11: Mark Rust
- Walking Football Lead: Alan Wookey

== Kit ==
Date	Manufacturer	Shirt Sponsor
2011–12	Joma	Playfish, R&D Travel
2012–14	Tempest	EA Sports
2014–17	Macron	Hevey Building Supplies, Fuelsell (back)
2017–20	Macron	Auto Windscreens, Fuelsell (back)
2020–22	Macron	Mind Rushden, Shield Labour Solutions, Fuelsell (back)
2022	Macron	Sports, Concerts & Events, PKS Training, Fuelsell (back)
2022-25	Macron	Rebel Energy, Fuelsell (back)
2025-Present	Macron	NRG UK Group, Fuelsell (back)

== Rivalries ==
Most rivalries were formed when the supporters still followed the original club, however the rivalries commenced once fans started following the phoenix club. Although this means that whereas local rivalries with league clubs such as Luton Town, Peterborough United and even Northampton Town have died down, the rivalry with Kettering Town has been re-ignited, and new rivalries such as with Wellingborough Town have been developed.

=== Kettering Town ===
Rushden's main rivals are nearby Kettering Town. Rushden & Diamonds F.C and Kettering Town played seventeen competitive games together, 16 in the Conference National and one in the FA Cup. The first competitive game between the sides was played out on 8 March 1997, with Rushden running out comfortable 5–1 winners at Rockingham Road. In the early years, derby games between the two would regularly attract crowds in excess of 4,500. The clubs remained in the same division for five seasons before, in 2001, Rushden gained promotion to the Football League, while Kettering were relegated that same season from the Conference. After a seven-year gap, in 2008–09 the teams again found themselves in the same division, after Rushden suffered two quickfire relegations and Kettering gained promotion from the Conference North.

In the 16 league games contested and over 1,000 minutes of league football played between the two sides, Kettering won just twice, while Rushden recorded nine victories. In the same number of games, Rushden scored 25 goals to the Poppies' eight. On 3 January 2011 Kettering ended an 11-year wait for a win over the Diamonds, beating Rushden for only the second time in their history with a 2–1 triumph at Nene Park. Throughout the history of the fixture, Rushden & Diamonds maintained an impressive record of having never lost a competitive away match against Kettering Town.

The rivalry resumed on 6 May 2016, when AFC Rushden & Diamonds met Kettering in the NFA Hillier Senior Cup final, which Diamonds won 2–1 at Northampton Town's Sixfields Stadium.

=== Northampton Town ===
The rivalry between the Diamonds and Northampton Town occurred between 2004 and 06, when the two clubs played in League Two together for two seasons. Eight games were played between the sides – four competitive league games and four pre-season cup games. The Diamonds recorded a sole league victory over Northampton, a 3–2 win at Nene Park during the 2004–2005 season thanks to a last minute goal from Billy Sharp. They also beat their rivals in two pre-season Maunsell Cup games. After the Diamonds' relegation out of the Football League this rivalry diminished in relevance, especially as this relegation led to the re-ignition of the Rushden-Kettering rivalry.

=== Other local rivals ===
Past rivalries from the original club's younger years were also enjoyed with Kidderminster Harriers, Cheltenham Town and Yeovil Town, with the three clubs often competing against each other in their various play-off and championship pushes. Rushden also enjoyed rivalries with various other clubs throughout their history. Peterborough United and Luton Town were seen as small rivals during the club's Football League days, due to the relative geographical proximity of the three clubs. Following the original Diamonds' relegation into the Conference, however (despite Luton's presence there also) these rivalries diminished considerably. As the new entity, a ground-share with Wellingborough Town means that a rivalry between the two tenants has ensued in Wellingborough.

== Season history ==
Updated 7th Sept 2024. * indicates position/round not final.

Season	League record											Average attendance	FA Cup	FA Vase	FA Trophy	League Cup	Hillier Cup
Season	Div	Level	P	W	D	L	GF	GA	GD	Pts	Pos	Average attendance	FA Cup	FA Vase	FA Trophy	League Cup	Hillier Cup
2011–12	Northants Senior Youth League	(Youth)	16	9	4	3	29	21	+8	30	5th	295				WN	
2012–13	United Counties League Division One	10	36	28	6	2	96	31	+65	90	2nd	544		R3		R1	
2013–14	United Counties League Premier Division	9	36	26	3	7	88	35	+53	81	3rd	470	3Q	R4		R1	R1
2014–15	United Counties League Premier Division	9	40	31	6	3	121	32	+89	99	1st	550	1Q	R2		WN	R1
2015–16	Southern League Division One Central	8	42	23	8	11	81	44	+37	77	5th	457	4Q		PR	R1	WN
2016–17	Northern Premier League Division One South	8	42	20	11	11	73	52	+21	71	5th	466	3Q		2Q	QF	R1
2017–18	Southern League Division One East	8	42	27	10	5	92	25	+67	91	2nd	501	2Q		PR	R3	SF
2018–19	Southern League Premier Division Central	7	42	15	16	11	60	49	+11	61	9th	562	1Q		2Q	R1	WN
2019–20	Southern League Premier Division Central	7	26	13	7	6	45	40	+5	46	7th	458	1Q		2Q	R3	QF
2020–21	Southern League Premier Division Central	7	7	2	3	2	14	11	+3	9	13th	377	1Q		R1		
2021–22	Southern League Premier Division Central	7	38	19	8	11	55	45	+10	65	5th	373	1Q		3Q	R1	RU
2022–23	Southern League Premier Division Central	7	42	8	7	27	40	87	-47	31	21st	343	1Q		3Q	R1	1R (dq)
2023–24	Northern Premier League Division One Midlands	8	38	9	5	24	38	78	-40	32	19th	413	PR		1Q		WN
2024–25	Northern Premier League Division One Midlands	8	40	13	10	17	44	61	-17	49	14th	401	PR		1Q		SF
2025–26	Northern Premier League Division One Midlands	8	42	14	13	15	56	61	-5	55	12th	441	EPR		R1		R1

- Most Goals in a Season: 28, Alfie Taylor, 2013–14
- Highest Home Cup Attendance: 1,875 vs Morecambe FC, FA Cup 4th Qualifying Round, 17 October 2026
- Highest Home League Attendance: 1,242 vs Coleshill Town F.C., Northern Premier League Division One Midlands, 25 April 2026
- Highest Away Attendance: 4,086 vs Burton Albion, FA Cup 1st Round Proper, 7th November 2026
- Longest Unbeaten League Run: 28 matches, 13 January 2015 - 31 October 2015
- Largest Competitive Win:

- 9-0 vs Buckingham Town, United Counties League Division One, 15 December 2012
- 9-0 vs Desborough Town, United Counties League Premier Division, 21 February 2015

- Largest Competitive Defeat: 8–2 vs Bromsgrove Sporting, Southern League Premier League Central, 5 October 2019

== Records ==
- Best FA Cup performance: First round, 2026–27
- Best FA Trophy performance: First round, 2020–21, 2025–26
- Best FA Vase performance: Fourth round, 2013–14

== Honours ==
=== Senior ===
- Southern League Division One Central (Level 8)
  - Runners-up: 2017-18
- United Counties Football League Premier Division (Level 9)
  - Champions: 2014–15
  - KO Cup Winners: 2014–15
- United Counties Football League Division One (Level 10)
  - Runners-up: 2012–13
- NFA Hillier Cup
  - Winners: 2016, 2019, 2024
- NFA Maunsell Cup
  - Winners: 2016, 2024
- The James Victory Cup
  - Winners: 2013, 2014
- Supporters Direct Shield
  - Winners: 2014
- Football Supporters' Association Brian Lomax Cup
  - Winners: 2025

=== Academy U23s ===
- The Chris Ruff Trophy
  - Winners: 2022-23

=== Academy U21s ===
- Midland Football League : Division U21 East
  - Runners Up: 2020–21

=== Academy U18s ===
- Northants Football Association David Joyce Cup Winners: 2017–18
- Northants Senior Youth League Western Division Champions: 2012–13
- Northants Senior Youth League Read-Flex Vase Winners: 2012–13
- Northants Senior Youth League Knock-Out Cup Winners: 2011–12

== See also ==
- Rushden & Diamonds F.C.
- Phoenix club (sports)
