= BSMFC =

BSMFC may refer to one of the following English football clubs:

- Boldmere St. Michaels F.C.
- Bugbrooke St Michaels F.C.
