= Solomon Upton =

English footballer (1891–1972)

Personal information
- Full name: Solomon Upton
- Date of birth: 7 February 1891
- Place of birth: Higham Ferrers, England
- Date of death: 1972 (aged 80–81)
- Position: Outside right

Senior career*
Years	Team	Apps	(Gls)
- Kettering Town
1912	Tottenham Hotspur	2	(0)
- Portsmouth
- Plymouth Argyle
- * Club domestic league appearances and goals

Solomon Upton (7 February 1891 – 1972) was an English professional footballer who played for Kettering Town, Tottenham Hotspur, Portsmouth and Plymouth Argyle.

== Career ==
Upton began his career at Kettering Town before joining Tottenham Hotspur in 1912. The outside right played on two occasions for the Lilywhites. After leaving White Hart Lane Upton went on to play for Portsmouth and finally Plymouth Argyle. Upton went on to play for Higham Town where he collected a winners' medal in the 1933 Maunsell Cup.

== Family life ==
Upton served as an able seaman in the Royal Navy during the First World War and married Florence Winter in 1916. He became Mayor of Higham Ferrers in 1949.
