= Sleaford Town F.C. =

Association football club in England

Coordinates: 53°00′0.48″N 0°23′23.22″W

Sleaford Town
- Full name: Sleaford Town Football Club
- Nicknames: Green Army; Town; Greens
- Founded: 1923; 103 years ago
- Ground: Eslaforde Park; Sleaford
- Capacity: 1,000
- Chairman: Damon Tunnicliffe
- Manager: Jamie McGhee
- League: United Counties League Division One
- 2025–26: United Counties League Division One, 19th of 23
- Website: www.sleafordtownfc.com
Home colours	Away colours

Sleaford Town F.C. is a football club based in Sleaford, Lincolnshire, England. The club plays in the United Counties League Division One.

== History ==
Sleaford Town were founded in 1923. They joined the Lincolnshire League, where they were generally successful, being a regular top-ten team. In 2003, Town announced plans to seek a higher level of football in the United Counties League. They had their best-ever season in 2003–04, winning the title for the first time in twenty-three years, and gaining promotion to the UCL

After leaving their previous ground, Sleaford played for three seasons at RAF Cranwell, but despite winning the Division One title in 2005–06, they were not allowed promotion until their new Eslaforde Park ground was ready the following season, and they finished runners-up.

The club are currently members of the United Counties League Premier Division, led by manager Matt Evans.

They first entered the FA Cup in season 2008–09, reaching the First Round Qualifying, while in the FA Vase, their best performance has been to reach the Fourth Round in season 2015–16.

== Current squad ==
Note: Flags indicate national team as defined under FIFA eligibility rules; some limited exceptions apply. Players may hold more than one non-FIFA nationality.

No.	Pos.	Nation	Player
1	GK	ENG	Liam Flitton
2	DF	ENG	Harrison Ainsle
3	MF	ENG	Ben Robson
4	MF	ENG	Kegan Everington
6	MF	ENG	Mitchell Clogg
7	MF	ENG	Sam Greenwood
8	MF	ENG	Joe Smith
9	FW	ENG	Tom Waumsley
10	FW	ENG	Tyrell Shannon-Lewis
11	DF	ENG	Ryan Flitton

No.	Pos.	Nation	Player
12	DF	ENG	Ollie Fields
13	FW	ENG	Josh Parker
14	FW	ENG	Billy Gillies
15	MF	ENG	Finlay Armond
16	DF	ENG	Max Ward
19	DF	ENG	Lewis Smalley
23	DF	ENG	Kyle Watkins
28	DF	ENG	Jake Henderson

== Management and coaching staff ==
=== Current staff ===
As of 10 May 2026

Position	Name
Player-Manager	(England) Jamie McGhee
Assistant Manager	(England) Alan Forwood
Coach	(England) Natasha Buckland
Coach	(Hungary) Gabor Szucs

== Honours ==
- United Counties League Division One
  - Champions 2005–06
  - Runners-up 2006–07

== Records ==
- FA Cup
  - First Qualifying Round 2008–09, 2009–10
- FA Vase
  - Fourth Round 2015-16

== See also ==
- Sleaford Town F.C. players
- Sleaford Town F.C. managers
