= Harrowby United F.C. =

Association football club in England

Coordinates: 52.9210°N 0.6144°W

Harrowby United
- Full name: Harrowby United Football Club
- Nickname: The Arrows
- Founded: 1949
- Ground: Dickens Road, Grantham
- Chairman: Mick Atter
- Manager: Nick Andersen
- League: United Counties League Division One
- 2025–26: United Counties League Premier Division North, 20th of 20 (relegated)
Home colours	Away colours

Harrowby United Football Club is a football club representing the parish of Harrowby in Grantham, Lincolnshire. They are currently members of the United Counties League Division One and play at Dickens Road.

== History ==
The club was established in 1949 and initially played in the Grantham & District League. They remained in the Grantham League until joining Division One of the Central Alliance in 1967. However, after a single season in the Central Alliance the club transferred to Division One of the East Midlands Regional League.

A fifth-place finish in 1973–74 saw Harrowby promoted to the Premier Division. The league became the Midlands Regional Alliance in 1985, and the club won the Premier Division and Challenge Cup double in 1989–90. They subsequently moved up to Division One of the United Counties League. Although the club won the division in 1991–92, they were unable to take promotion to the Premier Division. However, after finishing as Division One runners-up in 2002–03, the club were promoted to the Premier Division.

The 2005–06 season saw Harrowby finish bottom of the Premier Division, after which they dropped back into the Grantham & District League. The club spent the 2007–08 season in the Lincolnshire League, finishing bottom of the table, before joining the Supreme Division of the Central Midlands League. In 2009 they were renamed Grantham Rangers, but folded at the end of the 2009–10 season, which had seen them finish bottom of the Supreme Division.

A new Harrowby United was established in 2012 when Grantham & District League champions Beehive United changed their name to Harrowby United upon taking promotion to Division One of the United Counties League. In 2013–14 a third-place finish saw the club promoted to the Premier Division. They were relegated back to Division One after finishing second-from-bottom of the Premier Division in 2016–17. In 2023–24 the club finished fifth in Division One, qualifying for the promotion play-offs. After beating Clipstone 4–1 in the semi-finals, they defeated Newark Town 2–1 in the final to earn promotion to the Premier Division North.

In 2025–26 Harrowby finished bottom of the Premier Division North and were relegated back to Division One.

== Club officials ==
- Chairman: Mick Atter
- Secretary: Simon Jackson
- Manager: Nick Andersen
- Assistant Manager: Jake Hemstock

== Honours ==
- United Counties League
  - Division One champions 1991–92
- Midlands Regional Alliance
  - Premier Division champions 1989–90
  - Challenge Cup winners 1989–90

== Records ==
- Best FA Cup performance: Preliminary round, 2016–17
- Best FA Vase performance: Third round, 2026–27

== See also ==
- Harrowby United F.C. players
- Harrowby United F.C. managers
