= Cogenhoe United F.C. =

Association football club in England

Coordinates: 52°14′4.150″N 0°47′35.272″W

Cogenhoe United
- Full name: Cogenhoe United Football Club
- Nickname: Cooks
- Founded: 1967
- Ground: Compton Park, Cogenhoe
- Capacity: 5,000 (100 seated)
- Chairman: Derek Wright
- Manager: Scott Carlin
- 2024–25: United Counties League Premier Division South (resigned)
- Website: http://www.pitchero.com/clubs/cogenhoeutdfootballclub
Home colours	Away colours

Cogenhoe United Football Club is a football club based in Cogenhoe, near Northampton, Northamptonshire, England. They play at Compton Park.

== History ==
After playing friendly matches, the club joined the Central Village League, and were Division Two champions in 1951–52. However, they folded in the late 1950s or early 1960s, before being re-established in 1967, when they joined Division Two of the Central Northamptonshire Combination. They were promoted to Division One in the early 1970s, and a fourth-place finish in Division One in 1977–78 saw them promoted to the Premier Division. A period of success in the early 1980s saw them win the Premier Division title in 1980–81 and finish as runners-up the following season. They went on to win back-to-back titles in 1982–83 and 1983–84.

After finishing third in the Premier Division in 1984–85, Cogenhoe joined Division One of the United Counties League. After finishing second-from-bottom in their first season in the league and being forced to apply for re-election, the 1986–87 season saw them finish second in Division One, earning promotion to the Premier Division. They won the Premier Division Knock-Out Cup in 1995–96 and 1999–2000, and finished as Premier Division runners-up in 1999–2000 and 2000–01. In 2004–05 the club won the Premier Division.

== Ground ==
The club played on several pitches around the village before settling at the Playing Fields in 1950, with the first match played against Northampton Yeomanry. However, in order to gain promotion to the United Counties League, the club were required to build a new ground. A site was leased from the Marquis of Northampton, on which Compton Park was established. The first competitive match played at Compton Park was the club's final match in the Northamptonshire Central Combination before moving up to the United Counties League, with Cogenhoe beating Bugbrooke St. Michaels 1–0. An official opening match was arranged with Manchester United.

Floodlights were installed in 1992. The ground currently has a capacity of 5,000, of which 100 is seated and 200 covered.

== Honours ==
- United Counties League
  - Premier Division champions 2004–05
  - Premier Division Knock-Out Cup winners 1995–96, 1999–2000
- Central Northamptonshire Combination
  - Premier Division champions 1980–81, 1982–83, 1983–84
  - Division Two champions 1951–52
  - Knock-Out Cup winners 1981–82
- Buckingham Charity Cup
  - Winners 1999–2000, 2010–11
- Daventry Charity Cup
  - Winners 1991–92, 1995–96

== Records ==
- Best FA Cup performance: Third qualifying round, 2005–06
- Best FA Vase performance: Fourth round, 1993–94, 1996–97, 2006–07, 2008–09
- Record attendance: 1,000, charity match, 1990
- Most appearances: Tony Smith
- Most goals: Tony Smith

== See also ==
- Cogenhoe United F.C. players
- Cogenhoe United F.C. managers
