= Irchester United F.C. =

Association football club in England

Coordinates: 52.2815°N 0.6513°W

Irchester United
- Full name: Irchester United Football Club
- Nickname: The Romans
- Founded: 1883
- Ground: Alfred Street, Irchester
- Capacity: 1,000
- Chairman: David Cockings
- Manager: Daniel Stewart
- League: Spartan South Midlands League Division One
- 2025–26: Spartan South Midlands League Division One, 9th of 21
Home colours	Away colours

Irchester United Football Club is a football club based in the village of Irchester, Northamptonshire, England. They are currently members of the Spartan South Midlands League Division One and play at Alfred Street.

== History ==
The club was established as Irchester Excelsior in 1883, before being renamed Irchester United in 1885. They joined Division Two of the Northamptonshire League in 1896, but finished bottom of the division in the 1896–97 season and left the league. In 1928–29 the club won the Rushden & District League. After retaining the league title the following season, and also winning both the Northamptonshire Junior Cup and the Irchester Charity Cup, they rejoined Division Two of the United Counties League. The club went on to win the division at the first attempt, but they were not promoted. Although they won the division again the following season, they remained in Division Two. However, in 1933 the league was reduced to a single division, and in 1934 it was renamed the United Counties League. The club left the league again in 1936.

Returning to the Rushden & District League, which their reserves had won in 1932–33 and 1933–34 Irchester won the league in 1936–37. Between 1947 and 1957 they won four more league titles. In 1969 the club rejoined the United Counties League and were placed in Division Three, which became Division Two in 1972. They were Division Two runners-up in 1973–74, earning promotion to Division One. In 1980 the club was renamed Irchester Eastfield after a merger with Wellingborough Eastfield due to a shortage of players. However, they reverted to Irchester United in 1990. The next two decades were a period of struggle as the club ended the season in last place in Division One in 1990–91, 1991–92, 1995–96 and 1999–2000. Although the 2002–03 season saw a third-place finish, they finished bottom of the table in three successive seasons between 2006–07 and 2008–09. However, the following season, 2009–10, the club won the Division One title, earning promotion to the Premier Division.

Following three seasons in the Premier Division, Irchester were relegated back to Division One after finishing bottom of the division in 2012–13. At the end of the 2020–21 season they were transferred to Division One of the Spartan South Midlands League. In 2024–25 the club finished fourth in Division One, qualifying for the promotion play-offs, in which they lost on penalties to Moulton at the semi-final stage.

== Ground ==
The club initially played at the Boundleys, with a nearby working men's club used as the changing rooms. They moved to Alfred Street in 1921. During World War II the ground was ploughed up, and when football restarted after the war the club played at the Recreation Ground before returning to Alfred Street in 1952.

== Honours ==
- United Counties League
  - Division One champions 2009–10
  - Division Two champions 1930–31, 1931–32
- Rushden & District League
  - Champions 1928–29, 1929–30, 1936–37
- Northamptonshire Junior Cup
  - Winners 1929–30, 1933–34, 1948–49, 1975–76

== Records ==
- Best FA Cup performance: Extra preliminary round, 2011–12, 2012–13, 2013–14
- Best FA Vase performance: Second round, 2018–19
