= Thrapston Town F.C. =

Association football club in England

Coordinates: 52°23′57.19″N 0°32′20.48″W

Thrapston Town
- Full name: Thrapston Town Football Club
- Nickname: The Thrapo
- Founded: 1960 (as Thrapston Venturas)
- Ground: Chancery Lane, Thrapston
- Capacity: 1,000
- Chairman: Amelia Boddington
- Manager: Danny Warren
- League: Northamptonshire Combination Premier Division
- 2021–22: Northamptonshire Combination Premier Division, 13th of 15
Home colours

Thrapston Town F.C. is an English football club based in Thrapston, Northamptonshire. Whilst the men's team folded in 2022, the women's team competes in the East Midlands Women's Football League .

== History ==
The club was established in 1960 as Thrapston Ventura. They joined the Kettering Amateur League, winning the title in 1970–71, 1972–73, 1973–74, 1976–77 and 1977–78. In 1978 they moved up to Division Two of the United Counties League, finishing third in their first season and were subsequently placed in Division One after league restructuring. In 1996 the club adopted their current name. After finishing second in 2010–11, they were promoted to the Premier Division but finished bottom of the Premier League the next year, 2011–12 and were relegated back to Division One. By season 2020/21 the club was playing in the Northamptonshire Combination. In 2022, the men's team folded and now the club consists of only Thrapston Town Ladies FC who play in the East Midlands Women's Regional Football League.

== Honours ==
- United Counties League Division One
  - Runners-up 1999–2000, 2010–11
- Kettering Amateur League
  - Champions 1970–71, 1972–73, 1973–74, 1976–77, 1977–78

== Records ==
- FA Cup
  - First Qualifying Round 2011–12
- FA Vase
  - First Round 2008–09, 2010–11
