= Northampton Spencer F.C. =

Association football club in England

Coordinates: 52°15.324611′N 0°54.50154′W

Northampton Spencer
- Full name: Northampton Spencer Football Club
- Nickname: The Millers
- Founded: 1936 (as Spencer School Old Boys)
- Dissolved: 2016 (80 years)
- Ground: Kingsthorpe Mill; Studland Road; Northampton
- Capacity: 2,000
- Chairman: Graham Wrighting
- Manager: Ben Stone
- 2015–16: United Counties League; Premier Division, 13th
Home colours	Away colours

Northampton Spencer F.C. was a football club based in Northampton, England. Their ground was Kingsthorpe Mill. They played in the United Counties League Division One.

== History ==
Northampton Spencer FC was founded in 1936 as Spencer School Old Boys, from members of the old school team. In 1968, the club joined the United Counties League, and immediately earned promotion after finishing as runners-up. After starting their UCL life at Dallington Park, the club moved to Duston High School for two years before arriving at its current home at Kingsthorpe Mill in 1971. Spencer was relegated in 1981 and twelve months later finished at the foot of Division One. Fortunes were transformed by the arrival of ex-Northampton Town boss John Petts as manager and he led the Millers back to the Premier Division in 1985. Since then, Spencer has been one of the stronger sides in the league, rarely finishing out of the top ten, and winning the championship in 1991–92 with 101 points. At the end of the 2011/12, Spencer requested demotion after revenue streams dried up. The club spent three season in Division One under the management of Ben Stone, before regaining their Premier Division status for the 2015/16 season On 4 April 2015 Spencer successfully secured promotion back to the Premier Division with a convincing 3–1 away win at Olney. This was followed by 2–0 victory over local rivals ON Chenecks on 6 April sealing the UCL Division 1 title with 3 games to spare. 2015/16 was Spencer's last season because their chairman retired.

== Honours ==
- United Counties League Premier Division
  - Champions 1991–92
  - Runners-up 1992–93, 1997–98
  - Runners-up 1968–69 (then called Division One), 1984–85
  - Division One Champions 2014–15

== Records ==
- FA Cup
  - Second Qualifying Round 1999–2000, 2009–10
- FA Vase
  - Fourth Round 1987–88
