= Northampton Sileby Rangers F.C. =

Association football club in England

Coordinates: 52°16′32.02″N 0°51′08.34″W

Northampton Sileby Rangers
- Full name: Northampton Sileby Rangers Football Club
- Nickname: Rangers
- Founded: 1968 (as Sileby Rangers)
- Ground: Fernie Fields, Northampton
- Manager: James Wayman
- League: United Counties League Premier Division South
- 2024–25: United Counties League Premier Division South, 13th of 19
Home colours	Away colours

Northampton Sileby Rangers F.C. is a football club based in Northampton, England. They currently play in the United Counties League Premier Division South.

== History ==
The club was founded as Sileby Rangers in 1968 as the works team of the Sileby Engineering Company (named after the Leicestershire village of Sileby where it had been established). They initially played in Sunday leagues, and won the Northants Sunday Cup in 1975, having been runners-up two years earlier. They also reached the final (but failed to win) in 1979, 1983 and 1993.

In the mid-1980s the club joined the Northampton Town League. They won the title in 1989 and 1990 and finished second in 1991 and 1993. During this era, the club was known as Northampton Vanaid following a sponsorship deal.

In 1993, the club was promoted to the United Counties League, the first to do so from the Northampton Town league. In their first season in the division they won the title and the Northants Junior Cup. However, they were not promoted to the Premier Division due to a lack of floodlights. They won the Junior cup again in 1997, and in 2000 were renamed Northampton Sileby Rangers. More Junior Cups were won in 2002 and 2003, beating Rothwell Corinthians in the final on both occasions. They won the division for a second and third time in 2002–03 and 2004–05, but were again not promoted.

The 2012–13 season saw Glenn Botterill lead the team to the United Counties League Division One championship ahead of AFC Rushden & Diamonds, by winning 30 out of their 36 league games. Finances for the club dried up at the beginning of the 2013–14 season, however, which resulted in a mass exodus of the title winning team and ultimately in Glenn Botterill resigning his position at the club.

At the end of the 2020–21 season the club were transferred to Division One of the Spartan South Midlands League.

== Honours ==
- United Counties League
  - Division One champions 1993–94, 2002–03, 2004–05, 2012–13
- Northampton Town League
  - Champions 1988–89, 1989–90
- Northants Junior Cup
  - Winners 1994, 1997, 2002, 2003
- Northants Sunday Cup
  - Winners 1975

== Records ==
- FA Vase
  - Second Qualifying Round 2004–05, 2007–08, 2008–09

1st round proper 2013/14
