= Northampton ON Chenecks F.C. =

English football club

Coordinates: 52°14′25.46″N 0°51′53.24″W

Northampton Old Northamptonian Chenecks
- Full name: Northampton Old Northamptonian Chenecks Football Club
- Nickname: The Chens
- Founded: 1946
- Ground: The Old Northamptonians Sports Ground, Northampton
- Chairman: Eddie Slinn
- Manager: Leigh Burdett
- League: United Counties League Premier Division South
- 2025–26: United Counties League Premier Division South, 12th of 20
- Website: https://onchenecks.com
Home colours	Away colours

Northampton Old Northamptonian Chenecks F.C. are a football club based in Northampton, England. They play in the United Counties League Premier Division South.

== History ==
On 12 July 1919 Edward Reynolds established the Old Northamptonians Association in memory of the 94 members of staff, sixth formers, and leavers of Northampton Grammar School who had lost their lives in the First World War.

Reynolds wanted former pupils to maintain friendships and to continue playing sport, and he set up the club after a cricket match between recent leavers and the school first XI was played.

The football section was founded as Chenecks FC in 1946 under the guidance of well-known Coroner Sergeant of the Borough Police, George Lloyd. The club was formed to enable boys at the rugby playing Northampton Grammar School to play football. The club's unusual name is derived from the School Houses, Chipseys, Spencer, Beckett and St Crispins.

The club became members of the Northampton Minor League playing at under 17 level, and when the boys were too old for youth football the club joined the Town League in 1950, playing at Abington Park. In 1960 the Old Northamptonians association invited the club to become one of their sports sections, thus Chenecks became ON Chenecks and relocated to the Billing Road sports ground.

They joined the United Counties Football League in 1969, and are still members of that league, in Division One. During that time, they have always been members of the lowest division of the league, which has successively been known as Division Three, Division Two and Division One. The club has twice won the Division One Championship (in 1977–78 and 1979–80), but their ground has not been sufficiently developed to enable them to take promotion to the Premier Division. The lack of facilities at their ground is also the reason they have not been able to participate in any F.A. national competitions.

Chenecks beat Tam O'Shanter from Coventry to win the 1985 Daventry Charity Cup final and in 1994 they were Northants Junior Cup runners-up, losing 1–0 to Vanaid. In 1996 they lost 4–0 to Cogenhoe in the Daventry Charity Cup final having beaten Southern League Rothwell Town 1–0 away en route to the final.

In the 2009–10 season the club won its first major honour in the last twenty years under the guidance of Andy Marks when they picked up the Junior Cup with a 1 – 0 victory over local rivals Silbey at Nene Park. The 2010–11 season started with a change at the helm when rookie manager Graham Cottle accepted the vacant manager's position.

During 2014–15 season the club installed floodlights at the ground, the inclusion of other ground improvements (such as a turnstile) allowed them to compete in F.A. national competitions.

The 2015–16 season, under the continued management of Graham Cottle, Chenecks finished as runners up in the United Counties Division 1. As ground improvements (driven by the current Chairman Eddie Slinn) had been made during the season promotion was granted to the United Counties League Premier Division for the first time in the club's history. The promotion also meant that they were allowed to play in the FA Cup for the first time.

2017–18, after a 2nd stable season in the United Counties Premier Division with a 17th placed finish, Graham Cottle decided to end his 8-year reign at the club, finishing as one of the most successful managers at the club to date. His replacement for the new season had come from within the club as Eddie Slinn decided to promote reserve team manager Ben Foster into the role.

Chenecks would see subsequent finishes of 15th, 16th, and 9th in the 2018-19, 2019-20 and 2020-21 seasons, with the latter being ended early due to the Coronavirus Epidemic. Ahead of the 2021-22 season, Ben Foster stood down from the manager's role, with Wayne Richardson and Leigh Burdett taking up the reigns. The 2021-22 season saw Chenecks finish 20th where they were relegated to the Spartan South Midlands League.

The 2022-23 season saw Jamie Forrest appointed as first team manager ahead of the Spartan South Midlands League Division One campaign. The club would pick up 90 points this season, but this wasn't enough to be crowned champions with runaways Real Bedford picking up 99 points and the league title. Chenecks finished 2nd, but were knocked out in the playoff final by Rugby Borough in a 2-0 home defeat. Jamie Forrest stood down from the manager's role at the end of the season.

Ahead of the 2023–24 season with the club in the Spartan South Midlands League Division One, David White was appointed as First Team Manager. During the season, Chenecks would go on to win the Spartan South Midlands Division One league title, only losing one league game during the campaign, and were promoted to the United Counties League Premier Division South for the 2024–25 season.

During the 2025–26 season, David White stood down as First Team Manager due to personal reasons, and was replaced by club stalwart Leigh Burdett.

In the 2026–27 season, Chenecks reached the First Qualifying Round of the FA Cup for the first time in their history, defeating Retford FC 1-0 in the Preliminary Round and Heanor Town 2-1 in the Extra Preliminary Round.

== Honours ==
=== League ===
- Spartan South Midlands Football League Division One
  - Champions (1): 2023–24
  - Runners-up (1): 2022–23
- United Counties League Division One
  - Champions (2): 1977–78, 1979–80
  - Runners-up (2): 1978–79, 2015–16

=== Cup ===
- Daventry Charity Cup
  - Winners (1): 1985
  - Runners-up (1): 1996
- Northants Junior Cup
  - Winners (3): 2010, 2014, 2015
  - Runners-up (1): 1994
- UCL Premier Division Supplementary Cup
  - Runners-up (1): 2021

== Records ==
- Best FA Cup performance: First Qualifying Round, 2026–27
- Best FA Vase performance: Third round, 2024–25, 2025–26

== Former players ==
- Players that have played/managed in the football league or any foreign equivalent to this level (i.e. fully professional league).
  - Ryan Hughes
- Players with full international caps.
- Players that hold a club record or have captained the club.
  - (England) Jim Hall (Youth player)
  - Luke Davis (Club Captain)

== List of Recent Managers ==
- Graham Cottle, 2010 - 2018
- Ben Foster, 2018 - 2021
- Wayne Richardson, 2021 - 2022
- Jamie Forrest, 2022 - 2023
- David White, 2023 - 2025
- Leigh Burdett, 2025 - Present
