= Rushden & Higham United F.C. =

Association football club in England

Coordinates: 52°17′28″N 0°35′14″W

Rushden & Higham United
- Full name: Rushden & Higham United Football Club
- Nickname: The Lankies
- Founded: 2007
- Ground: Hayden Road, Rushden
- Capacity: 1,500
- Chairman: Aidy Mann
- Manager: Danny Jackson
- League: Spartan South Midlands League Division One
- 2025–26: Spartan South Midlands League Division One, 14th of 21
Home colours	Away colours

Rushden & Higham United F.C. is a football club based in Rushden, Northamptonshire, England. They are currently members of the Spartan South Midlands League Division One.

== History ==
=== Higham Town ===
Records show that a Higham Town club was formed in 1876 at a meeting held in the Griffin. There was a team competing in the Northants League (now the United Counties League) during the 1890s and in 1895 the team were runners up in the Northamptonshire FA Junior cup. They joined the Northamptonshire League in 1897.

The club's golden age was however in the 1920s. Re-formed after the end of the "great war" the team started in the Wellingborough and District league in season 1920–21, winning the NFA junior cup and gaining admittance to the Northants league. the team won the league at the first attempt together with the NFA senior cup. the league title was retained the following season and the county FA's premier competition, the Maunsell Cup was also won, a unique cup treble unlikely ever again to be repeated. That same season also saw the club draw at Football League third division north side Chesterfield, 4–4 in the FA Cup, only to lose 1–0 at home in the replay. The club were the highest scorers in the FA Cup that year.

In 1923–24 and 1926–27 the club were runners up in the league and in 1931 and 1933 were senior cup runners up. In 1934 the Maunsell cup was won for the second and to date the last time by a United Counties League side. Northampton Town who had beaten First Division leaders Huddersfield Town in the FA Cup earlier in the season being beaten finalists.

On the resumption of league football in 1946 the club played in the Rushden & District League where they remained for four seasons before rejoining the UCL. During the period 1950 to 1997 the highest league position achieved was second on seven occasions, In 1970–71, again in the following season and then in 1989–90 and in each of the four seasons from 1992–93 to 1995–96. finally in 1997–98 they won Division One, their first league title for 75 years but were runners up again once again in 1998–99. In 1994–95 the NFA junior cup was won for only the second time and the reserves were promoted to the UCL Reserve Division One for the first time.

The first team were runners up in the Division Two knock out cup in 1954 whilst the reserves won the division three cup in 1980. More recently the club beat a number of Premier Division sides in the revamped league cup. this includes the record win, 7–0 against Wellingborough Town whilst in 1995–96 they won 1–0 away to Premier Division Champions and FA Vase quarter-finalists Raunds Town and have twice reached the semi-finals of the competition.

=== Rushden Rangers ===
Rushden Rangers were formed as a youth football club in 1978 and it was not until the mid-1990s that a senior section was formed. In the short time that they were in existence before the merger they won the NFA lower junior cup as well as being Northants Combination league and KO cup winners.

Founded by Steve Cavender in 1978 who was inspired by watching local lads playing a game of football at Melloway Park. He was General Secretary until 1990. The Rangers started by playing friendlies with only 3 teams coached by Bruce Ogden and Joe Payne. They had expanded to 5 teams by 1990 ranging in age from 11 to 15. Players went on to Higham Youth Team at 16. Home games were played at Jubilee Park, Spencer Park and Higham.

In 1994 Neil Gant offered the Hayden Road ground to Rushden Rangers when Rushden Town formed with Irthlingborough Diamonds to become Rushden and Diamonds Football Club. On 19 May 1995 a meeting was held at Rushden & Diamonds and the offer was made to purchase the facilities of Rushden Town F.C. at Hayden Road

=== Merger ===
In 2007 the decision was made to merge the two clubs, with the new club playing at Rangers' ground in order to preserve United Counties League football within the two towns. With assistance from the Stadia Improvement fund the Hayden Road ground was brought up to the required standard and Rushden & Higham United was founded. Rushden Rangers continued at youth level for one season before also changing their name to Rushden & Higham United.

At the end of the 2020–21 season the club were transferred to Division One of the Spartan South Midlands League finishing in a credible 11th place in their first season under the management of Tyler Merries.

The Lankies finished 14th in the Spartan South Midlands League in the 2022–23 season with Aaron Cormack taking charge.

The Lankies finished 18th in the Spartan South Midlands League in the 2023–24 season with Jon Shanks replacing Aaron Cormack two thirds of the way through the season.

The Lankies finished 17th in the Spartan South Midlands League in the 2024-25 season with Danny Jackson replacing Jon Shanks in late December 2024.

=== Notable ex players ===
Ernie Toseland part of Higham Town's successful side of the early 1920s who went on to play over 300 games for Manchester City between 1928 and 1938 winning both the League and FA Cup

Solomon Upton former Higham Town player who played for Tottenham Hostpur prior to the First World War

Greg Downs former Higham Town player who went onto play in the Football League for Norwich City and Coventry City where he won an FA Cup Winners medal in 1987.

== Records ==
First Team Only

- FA Cup
  - Extra Preliminary Round :- 2011–12, 2012–13, 2013–14
- FA Vase
  - First Qualifying Round :- 2013–14
  - Second Qualifying Round :- 2008–09, 2009–10, 2011–12, 2012–13,
- NFA Les Underwood Junior Cup
  - R1:- 2009–10, 2010–11, 2014–15
  - R2:-
  - R3:- 2008–09,2013–14,
  - Final:- 2007–08, 2012–13,
- UCL League Cup
  - R1:-2007–08, 2008–09, 2010–11, 2013–14, 2014–15
  - R2:-2009–10, 2011–12
  - Q/Final:- 2012–13,

Honours

- 1895 - NFA Junior Cup Runners Up
- 1921 - NFA Junior Cup Winners
- 1921 - Wellingborough & District League Runners Up
- 1922 - Northants League Winners
- 1922 - NFA Senior Cup Winners
- 1922 - Raunds Charity Shield Winners
- 1922 - Irthlingborough Charity Cup Runners Up
- 1923 - Northants League Winners
- 1923 - NFA Senior Cup Winners
- 1923 - Maunsell Cup Winners
- 1923 - Rushden Charity Cup Runners Up
- 1924 - Northants League Runners Up
- 1927 - Northants League Runners Up
- 1931 - NFA Senior Cup Runners Up
- 1933 - NFA Senior Cup Runners Up
- 1934 - Maunsell Cup Winners
- 1953 - Irchester Charity Cup Winners
- 1954 - United Counties League Division Two Cup Runners Up
- 1971 - United Counties League Division One Runners Up
- 1990 - United Counties League Division One Runners Up
- 1992 - United Counties League Division One Runners Up
- 1993 - United Counties League Division One Runners Up
- 1994 - United Counties League Division One Runners Up
- 1995 - United Counties League Division One Runners Up
- 1995 - NFA Junior Cup Winners
- 1998 - United Counties League Division One Winners
- 1999 - United Counties League Division One Runners Up
- 2008 - NFA Junior Cup Runners Up
- 2013 - NFA Junior Cup Winners
- 2016 - NFA Lower Junior Cup Winners
- 2016 - United Counties League Reserve Division Winners
- 2026 - NFA Junior Cup Winners
