= Bugbrooke St Michaels F.C. =

Association football club in Bugbrooke, Northamptonshire, England

Coordinates: 52.2058°N 1.0028°W

Bugbrooke St Michaels
- Full name: Bugbrooke St Michaels Football Club
- Nickname: The Badgers
- Founded: 1929
- Ground: Birds Close, Bugbrooke
- Capacity: 2,500 (120 seated)
- Chairman: Kevin Gardner
- Manager: Calvin Green
- League: Spartan South Midlands League Division One
- 2025–26: United Counties League Premier Division South, 19th of 20 (relegated)
Home colours	Away colours

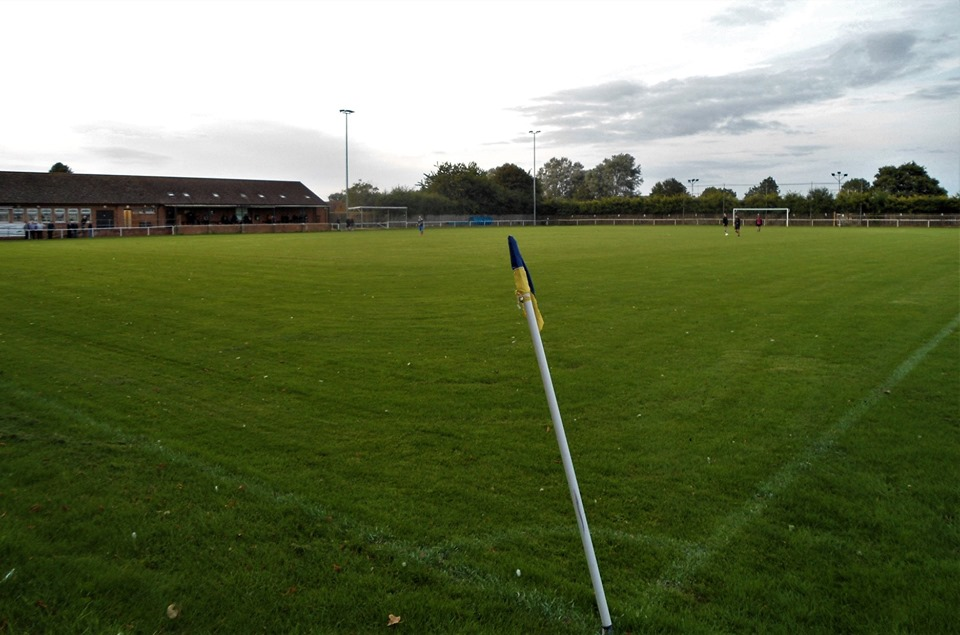
Birds Close in 2019

Bugbrooke St Michaels Football Club is a football club based in Bugbrooke, Northamptonshire, England. They are members of the Spartan South Midlands League Division One and play at Birds Close.

== History ==
The club was established in 1929 and named after the village church. They joined the Central Northamptonshire Combination in 1952, and won the league without losing a match in 1968–69. They retained the title the following season and were champions again in 1971–72. They were relegated to Division One at the end of the 1974–75, but returned to the Premier Division in 1976, going on to be champions again in 1976–77 and 1985–86.

After finishing third in 1986–87, they moved up to Division One of the United Counties League. They won the Northamptonshire Junior Cup in 1989–90. After becoming Division One champions in 1998–99, the club were promoted to the Premier Division. However, they were relegated back to Division One at the end of the 2001–02 season after finishing second-from-bottom in the Premier Division. The club won the Northamptonshire Junior Cup again in 2011–12. In 2021 they were promoted to the Premier Division South based on their results in the abandoned 2019–20 and 2020–21 seasons. In 2025–26 the club finished second-from-bottom of the Premier Division South and were relegated to Division One of the Spartan South Midlands League.

== Ground ==
The club play at Birds Close, located on the southern edge of the village next to the rugby club.

== Honours ==
- United Counties League
  - Division One champions 1998–99
- Central Northamptonshire Combination
  - Champions 1968–69, 1969–70, 1971–72, 1976–77, 1985–86
- Northamptonshire Junior Cup
  - Winners 1989–90, 2011–12

== Records ==
- Best FA Cup performance: First qualifying round, 2012–13
- Best FA Vase performance: Second round, 2009–10
- Record attendance: 1,156
- Most appearances: Jimmy Nord
- Most goals: Vince Thomas
