= Wellingborough Whitworth F.C. =

Association football club in England

Coordinates: 52°17′35″N 0°40′56″W

Wellingborough Whitworth
- Full name: Wellingborough Whitworth Football Club
- Nickname: The Flourmen
- Founded: 1973 (as Whitworths)
- Ground: The Victoria Mill Ground, Wellingborough
- Capacity: 2140 (290 seated)
- Chairman: Martin Goodes
- Manager: James Mallows
- League: Spartan South Midlands League Division One
- 2025–26: Spartan South Midlands League Division One, 8th of 21
Home colours	Away colours

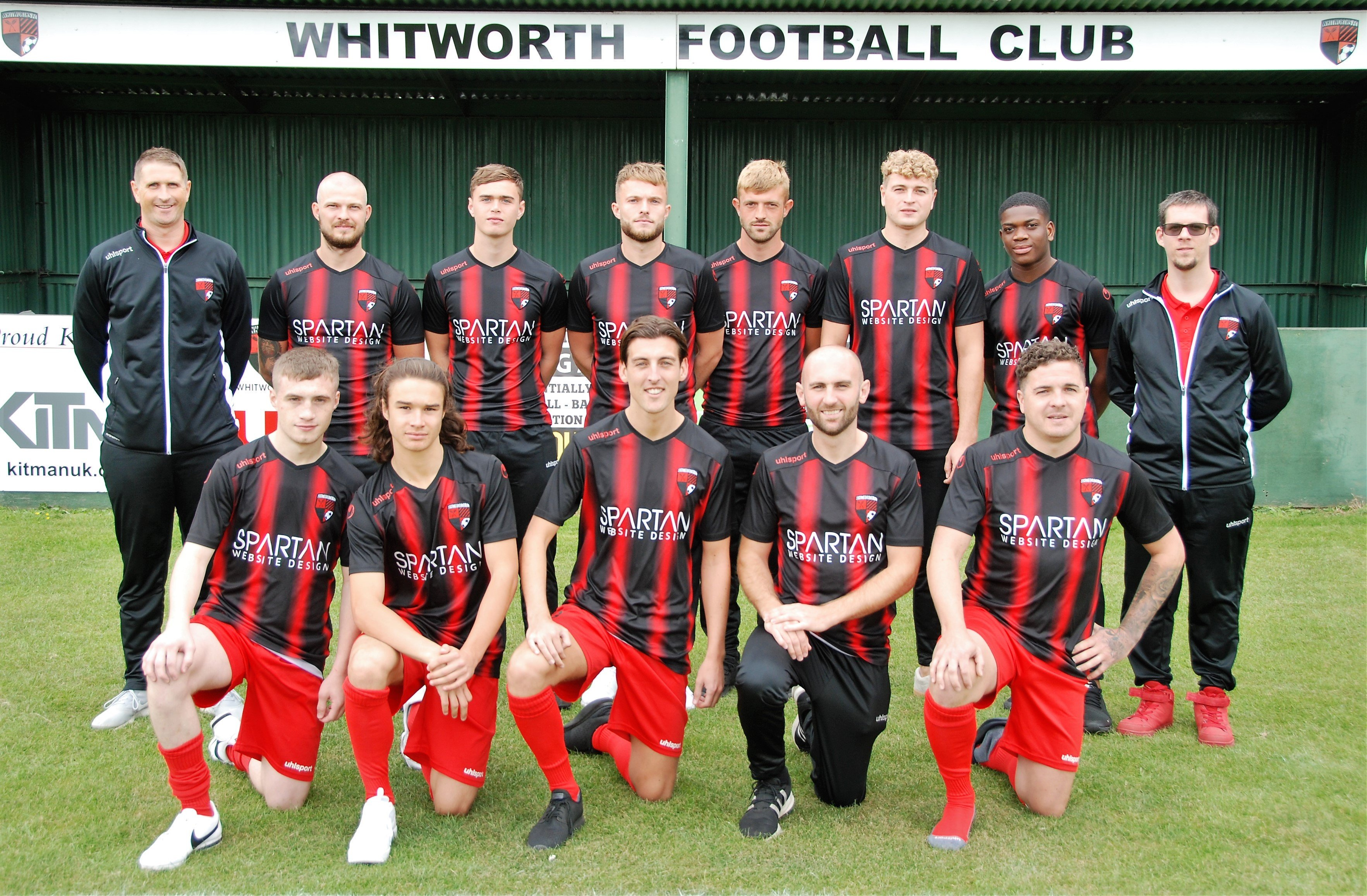
Whitworth's FC 2019-20

Whitworth's - dugout side

Whitworth's stand

Whitworth's main stand "Woodley and Faulkner Stand"

Sheltered terrace

Wellingborough Whitworth Football Club is an English football club based in Wellingborough, Northamptonshire. The club is currently a member of the Spartan South Midlands League Division One and play at Victoria Mill, London Road. The club is managed by James Mallows. The team is named after milling business Whitworths and are nicknamed "the flourmen".

== History ==
The club was established in 1973 after London Ideal Clothiers folded. At the time most Clothiers players were also playing for the Sunday league team Victoria Millers, and after discussing the idea with Dave Woodley, Whitworth FC was established. The new club started in Division One of the Rushden and District League. After winning the Division in 1975–76 and 1976–77, they moved up to the East Midlands Alliance. The club won the league's Munton Cup twice. On the second occasion, both the first team and the reserve teams reached the final, with the reserve team winning 6–2. The following season reserve teams were banned from entering the cup.

After making several improvements to their ground, the club moved up to Division One of the United Counties League in 1985. Since then the club have remained in Division One, twice finishing as runners-up, and winning the division without losing a match in 2006–07.

In the summer of 2013, managers Steve Sargent and Matty Freeman were sacked and replaced by former Flourmen striker James Daldy and his assistant and former professional Tommy Jaszczun.

In the summer of 2013, Whitworth experienced a large turnover of players and eventually finished 17th in Division One in Daldy's first season. During the 2013–14 season Whitworth recorded their record high win, defeating Woodford United 16–0 on 17 March 2014. The goalscorers were Ross Patrick (2), Dan Bendon, Jonny Hazell, Matt Hibberd (3), Taylor Orosz (3), Mark Pryor (2) and Jamie White (3). A UCL record that still stands.

The Flourmen finished a respectable seventh in the 2014–15 season after threatening promotion for a number of early months.

In January 2014, Whitworth signed 46-year-old former England defender Neil Ruddock. Daldy departed early into the 2015–16 season and was replaced by his assistant, Tommy Jaszczun for the remainder of the season.

In 2016 James Mallows was appointed manager replacing Jaszczun and The Flourmen were promoted from the United Counties League Division One in the 2016–17 season in Mallows' debut season.

The club competed in the United Counties League Premier Division in the 2017–18 season for the first time in their existence and in their first-ever game beat Peterborough Northern Star F.C. 5–0 away from home.

The Flourmen survived their first season in the UCL Premier on goal difference after beating local rivals Wellingborough Town 3–1 on the final day of the season. The 2018–19 season was tougher for them though as they slipped back into UCL Division One.

In the summer of 2019, Simon Anderson was appointed the First Team Manager, during the season James Mallows returned to the club as First Team Manager. At the end of the 2020–21 season the club were transferred to Division One of the Spartan South Midlands League.

== Honours ==
- United Counties League
  - Division One Champions 2006–07
  - Division One Runners-Up 2016–17
- East Midlands Alliance
  - Munton Cup winners twice
- Rushden & District League
  - Division One Champions 1975–76, 1976–77

== Records ==
- Record attendance: 1,150 vs Wellingborough Town, United Counties League Division One, 24 December 2005
- Record win: 16-0 vs Woodford United, United Counties League Division One, 17 March 2014 News Report

== Players ==
=== Current squad ===
Note: Flags indicate national team as defined under FIFA eligibility rules; some limited exceptions apply. Players may hold more than one non-FIFA nationality.

No.	Pos.	Nation	Player
1	GK	ENG	Niall Shackleton
5	DF	ENG	Nathan Heycock
12	DF	ENG	Ryan Baxter
2	DF	ENG	Remy Brittain
6	DF	GHA	Frederick Amankwa
3	DF	ENG	Tom North (capt)
8	MF	ENG	Vikram Mazumdar
17	MF	ENG	Louis McMahon
20	MF	ENG	Liam Morrissey

No.	Pos.	Nation	Player
7	MF	ENG	Rorke Thompson
19	MF	ZIM	Milton Ncube
18	MF	ENG	Jacob Thompson
12	MF	ENG	Alistair Duncan
4	MF	ENG	WILL HOWES
10	MF	ENG	Liam Morrissey
9	FW	ENG	Zak Ward
14	FW	ENG	Stedman Whittaker
11	FW	ENG	MASON RICHARDSON
16	FW	ENG	Daniel Uche
