= Rothwell Corinthians F.C. =

Association football club in England

Coordinates: 52.4270°N 0.8080°W

Rothwell Corinthians
- Full name: Rothwell Corinthians Football Club
- Nickname: The Corinthians
- Founded: 1934
- Ground: Sergeants Lawn; Desborough Road; Rothwell
- Chairman: Mark Budworth (Acting)
- Manager: Wayne Abbott
- League: Spartan South Midlands League Division One
- 2025–26: Spartan South Midlands League Division One, 18th of 21
Home colours	Away colours

Rothwell Corinthians F.C. is a football club based in Rothwell, Northamptonshire, England. They play in the Spartan South Midlands League Division One.

== History ==
The Rothwell Corinthians were founded in 1934 as a church youth side, joining the Kettering Amateur League, which became the East Midlands Alliance. For many years, the Corinthians lived in the shadow of near neighbours Rothwell Town until Town folded.

The club started out playing at the local recreation ground, moving to Rothwell Town's cricket ground in the early 1980s, and starting to conduct their affairs more seriously. The East Midlands Alliance too raised its game, and in 1984 the Corinthians gained promotion to the Premier Division. The club purchased land in Desborough Road. Their present ground opened in 1988.

In 1989–90 the Corinthians won the Premier Division championship for the first time, and 1994–95 saw a repeat. Following discussions with the management committee, Corinthians were admitted to the United Counties League for the 1995–96 season. Ground improvements continued; floodlighting was installed in 1999, which has enabled the club to compete in the FA Vase.

The club enjoyed a successful period from 2007 to 2008, their third-place finish in Division One, proving sufficient to earn promotion to the Premier Division. Successive managers failed to keep Corinthians in the top flight and relegation to Division One was confirmed in 2010–11.

2014-15 proved to be the most successful season in Corinthians history. A highly impressive season with highlights such as a 10-game winning run which included 8 consecutive clean sheets, led to a second-place finish in United Counties League Division One and ultimately a return to the Premier Division.

== Officials ==
Acting Chairman	Mark Budworth
Vice-chairman	Vacant
Club Secretary	Vacant
Treasurer	May Clelland
Committee	Cath Ielapi, Frank Ielapi, Mick Johnson, Mick "Butch" Joy, Andy Pawluk, Bev Roberts, Mick Whittemore, Hayley Wills
1st Team Manager	Wayne Abbott
Joint Reserve Team Managers	Lee Ainsworth, James McClaren & Gary Williamson
Under 18 Manager	Thomas McClaren
