= 2006–07 United Counties League =

The 2006–07 United Counties League season was the 100th in the history of the United Counties League, a football competition in England.

== Premier Division ==
United Counties League Premier Division
- Season: 2006–07
- Champions: Deeping Rangers
- Relegated: Ford Sports Daventry; Buckingham Town
- Matches: 420
- Goals: 1,422 (3.39 per match)

The Premier Division featured 20 clubs which competed in the division last season, along with one new club:

- Wellingborough Town, promoted from Division One

=== League table ===
| Pos | Team | Pld | W | D | L | GF | GA | GD | Pts | Promotion or relegation |
|---|---|---|---|---|---|---|---|---|---|---|
| 1 | Deeping Rangers | 40 | 30 | 7 | 3 | 95 | 25 | +70 | 97 | |
| 2 | Boston Town | 40 | 31 | 2 | 7 | 110 | 47 | +63 | 95 | |
| 3 | Wellingborough Town | 40 | 25 | 7 | 8 | 87 | 48 | +39 | 82 | |
| 4 | Potton United | 40 | 23 | 9 | 8 | 91 | 44 | +47 | 78 | |
| 5 | Cogenhoe United | 40 | 23 | 4 | 13 | 101 | 53 | +48 | 73 | |
| 6 | Northampton Spencer | 40 | 22 | 7 | 11 | 69 | 41 | +28 | 73 | |
| 7 | Newport Pagnell Town | 40 | 19 | 7 | 14 | 63 | 67 | −4 | 64 | |
| 8 | Blackstones | 40 | 17 | 12 | 11 | 79 | 51 | +28 | 63 | |
| 9 | Wootton Blue Cross | 40 | 18 | 8 | 14 | 70 | 57 | +13 | 62 | |
| 10 | St Ives Town | 40 | 17 | 8 | 15 | 56 | 49 | +7 | 59 | |
| 11 | Holbeach United | 40 | 14 | 10 | 16 | 50 | 65 | −15 | 52 | |
| 12 | Long Buckby | 40 | 14 | 8 | 18 | 68 | 67 | +1 | 50 | |
| 13 | Raunds Town | 40 | 13 | 6 | 21 | 61 | 77 | −16 | 45 | |
| 14 | Desborough Town | 40 | 15 | 5 | 20 | 60 | 76 | −16 | 44 (Note: Desborough Town were deducted six points.) | |
| 15 | Yaxley | 40 | 12 | 9 | 19 | 59 | 69 | −10 | 42 (Note: Yaxley were deducted three points.) | |
| 16 | Stewarts & Lloyds Corby | 40 | 11 | 8 | 21 | 52 | 87 | −35 | 41 | |
| 17 | St. Neots Town | 40 | 12 | 5 | 23 | 47 | 86 | −39 | 41 | |
| 18 | Bourne Town | 40 | 11 | 6 | 23 | 61 | 92 | −31 | 39 | |
| 19 | Stotfold | 40 | 10 | 6 | 24 | 57 | 101 | −44 | 36 | |
| 20 | Ford Sports Daventry | 40 | 6 | 5 | 29 | 47 | 103 | −56 | 23 | Relegated to Division One |
| 21 | Buckingham Town | 40 | 4 | 7 | 29 | 39 | 117 | −78 | 19 | Relegated to Division One |

Source: fchd
Rules for classification: 1) points; 2) goal difference; 3) number of goals scored.

== Division One ==
United Counties League Division One
- Season: 2006–07
- Champions: Wellingborough Whitworth
- Promoted: Sleaford Town; Kempston Rovers
- Matches: 240
- Goals: 930 (3.88 per match)

Division One featured 16 clubs which competed in the division last season, no new clubs joined the division this season.

=== League table ===
| Pos | Team | Pld | W | D | L | GF | GA | GD | Pts | Promotion |
|---|---|---|---|---|---|---|---|---|---|---|
| 1 | Wellingborough Whitworth | 30 | 23 | 7 | 0 | 87 | 34 | +53 | 76 | |
| 2 | Sleaford Town | 30 | 21 | 8 | 1 | 87 | 35 | +52 | 68 (Note: Sleaford Town were deducted three points.) | Promoted to the Premier Division |
| 3 | Kempston Rovers | 30 | 17 | 9 | 4 | 83 | 37 | +46 | 60 | Promoted to the Premier Division |
| 4 | Daventry Town | 30 | 15 | 8 | 7 | 75 | 43 | +32 | 53 | |
| 5 | Peterborough Northern Star | 30 | 13 | 6 | 11 | 68 | 51 | +17 | 45 | |
| 6 | Higham Town | 30 | 13 | 4 | 13 | 53 | 44 | +9 | 43 | |
| 7 | Rothwell Corinthians | 30 | 12 | 7 | 11 | 52 | 49 | +3 | 43 | |
| 8 | Thrapston Town | 30 | 12 | 7 | 11 | 60 | 64 | −4 | 43 | |
| 9 | Olney Town | 30 | 7 | 14 | 9 | 48 | 55 | −7 | 35 | |
| 10 | Eynesbury Rovers | 30 | 9 | 8 | 13 | 49 | 73 | −24 | 35 | |
| 11 | Burton Park Wanderers | 30 | 8 | 9 | 13 | 42 | 58 | −16 | 33 | |
| 12 | Northampton Sileby Rangers | 30 | 9 | 4 | 17 | 53 | 69 | −16 | 31 | |
| 13 | Bugbrooke St Michaels | 30 | 9 | 2 | 19 | 41 | 82 | −41 | 29 | |
| 14 | Huntingdon Town | 30 | 7 | 8 | 15 | 49 | 70 | −21 | 28 (Note: Desborough Town were deducted one point.) | |
| 15 | Northampton ON Chenecks | 30 | 5 | 7 | 18 | 49 | 80 | −31 | 22 | |
| 16 | Irchester United | 30 | 2 | 8 | 20 | 34 | 86 | −52 | 14 | |

Source: fchd
Rules for classification: 1) points; 2) goal difference; 3) number of goals scored.
