= 1996–97 United Counties League =

The 1996–97 United Counties League season was the 90th in the history of the United Counties League, a football competition in England.

== Premier Division ==
United Counties League Premier Division
- Season: 1996–97
- Champions: Stamford
- Relegated: Newport Pagnell Town
- Matches: 380
- Goals: 1,288 (3.39 per match)

The Premier Division featured 19 clubs which competed in the division last season, along with one new club:

- Ford Sports Daventry, promoted from Division One

=== League table ===
Pos	Team	Pld	W	D	L	GF	GA	GD	Pts	Promotion or relegation
1	Stamford	38	26	3	9	79	51	+28	81	
2	Spalding United	38	23	7	8	78	37	+41	76	
3	Stotfold	38	22	7	9	90	48	+42	73	
4	Long Buckby	38	21	10	7	63	39	+24	73	
5	Boston Town	38	21	9	8	88	39	+49	72	
6	Stewarts & Lloyds Corby	38	21	8	9	84	64	+20	71	
7	Cogenhoe United	38	20	6	12	90	62	+28	66	
8	Potton United	38	18	8	12	57	49	+8	62	
9	Desborough Town	38	17	9	12	63	49	+14	60	
10	St. Neots Town	38	16	11	11	81	58	+23	59	
11	Mirrlees Blackstone	38	16	5	17	68	65	+3	53	
12	Ford Sports Daventry	38	14	7	17	64	64	0	49	
13	Northampton Spencer	38	13	8	17	69	70	−1	47	
14	Eynesbury Rovers	38	12	11	15	52	56	−4	47	
15	Wellingborough Town	38	10	6	22	52	72	−20	36	
16	Wootton Blue Cross	38	9	8	21	40	60	−20	35	
17	Kempston Rovers	38	9	6	23	41	89	−48	33	
18	Bourne Town	38	8	7	23	49	100	−51	31	
19	Holbeach United	38	7	6	25	43	101	−58	27	
20	Newport Pagnell Town	38	3	6	29	37	115	−78	15	Relegated to Division One

Source: fchd
Rules for classification: 1) points; 2) goal difference; 3) number of goals scored.

== Division One ==
United Counties League Division One
- Season: 1996–97
- Champions: Yaxley
- Promoted: Yaxley
- Matches: 306
- Goals: 977 (3.19 per match)

Division One featured 17 clubs which competed in the division last season, along with one new club:

- Huntingdon United, joined from the West Anglia League

Also, Thrapston Venturas changed name to Thrapston Town.

=== League table ===
Pos	Team	Pld	W	D	L	GF	GA	GD	Pts	Promotion
1	Yaxley	34	23	5	6	81	25	+56	74	Promoted to the Premier Division
2	Wellingborough Whitworth	34	19	12	3	72	28	+44	69	
3	Bugbrooke St Michaels	34	20	8	6	60	30	+30	68	
4	Higham Town	34	18	10	6	59	42	+17	64	
5	Huntingdon United	34	19	2	13	87	57	+30	59	
6	Rothwell Corinthians	34	16	7	11	61	40	+21	55	
7	St Ives Town	34	16	7	11	52	34	+18	55	
8	Cottingham	34	17	3	14	56	59	−3	54	
9	Thrapston Town	34	14	7	13	51	51	0	49	
10	Northampton Vanaid	34	13	6	15	56	55	+1	45	
11	Olney Town	34	13	6	15	42	47	−5	45	
12	Harrowby United	34	12	6	16	62	68	−6	42	
13	Daventry Town	34	10	6	18	46	78	−32	36	
14	Northampton ON Chenecks	34	10	5	19	46	54	−8	35	
15	Burton Park Wanderers	34	9	7	18	50	64	−14	34	
16	Sharnbrook	34	10	4	20	34	83	−49	34	
17	Irchester United	34	7	7	20	34	70	−36	28	
18	Blisworth	34	5	2	27	28	92	−64	17	

Source: fchd
Rules for classification: 1) points; 2) goal difference; 3) number of goals scored.
