= 1979–80 United Counties League =

The 1979–80 United Counties League season was the 73rd in the history of the United Counties League, a football competition in England.

== Premier Division ==
United Counties League Premier Division
- Season: 1979–80
- Champions: Stamford
- Matches: 342
- Goals: 952 (2.78 per match)

The Premier Division featured 19 clubs which competed in the division last season, no new clubs joined the division this season.

=== League table ===
Pos	Team	Pld	W	D	L	GF	GA	GD	Pts	Promotion or relegation
1	Stamford	36	26	6	4	76	29	+47	58	
2	Desborough Town	36	23	9	4	71	31	+40	55	
3	Irthlingborough Diamonds	36	21	8	7	70	36	+34	50	
4	Potton United	36	17	11	8	58	34	+24	45	
5	Rushden Town	36	18	9	9	56	41	+15	45	
6	Rothwell Town	36	14	13	9	52	36	+16	41	
7	Ampthill Town	36	14	11	11	52	48	+4	39	
8	Wootton Blue Cross	36	14	9	13	64	49	+15	37	
9	Stewart & Lloyds Corby	36	14	9	13	50	50	0	37	
10	Long Buckby	36	13	9	14	54	59	−5	35	
11	Buckingham Town	36	13	9	14	50	56	−6	35	
12	St Neots Town	36	12	8	16	45	52	−7	32	
13	Olney Town	36	12	7	17	39	54	−15	31	Demoted to Division One
14	Holbeach United	36	11	9	16	46	67	−21	31	
15	Wolverton Town	36	11	7	18	42	51	−9	29	
16	Bourne Town	36	8	7	21	38	64	−26	23	
17	Kempston Rovers	36	8	6	22	40	68	−28	22	
18	Eynesbury Rovers	36	8	4	24	26	59	−33	20	
19	Northampton Spencer	36	5	9	22	23	68	−45	19	

Source: nonleaguematters
Rules for classification: 1) points; 2) goal difference; 3) number of goals scored.

== Division One ==
United Counties League Division One
- Season: 1979–80
- Champions: Northampton ON Chenecks

The Division One featured 16 clubs which competed in the division last season, along with 2 new clubs, promoted from Division Two:

- British Timken Duston
- Ford Sports Daventry

=== League table ===
Pos	Team	Pld	W	D	L	GF	GA	GD	Pts	Promotion or relegation
1	Northampton ON Chenecks	34	24	8	2	85	31	+54	56	
2	Corby Gainsborough	34	24	7	3	74	23	+51	55	
3	Biggleswade Town	34	21	6	7	103	42	+61	48	Transferred to the South Midlands League
4	Higham Town	34	20	6	8	69	38	+31	46	
5	Wootton Blue Cross reserves	34	17	9	8	57	37	+20	43	Joined Reserve Division
6	British Timken Duston	34	17	8	9	61	31	+30	42	
7	British Timken Athletic	34	16	8	10	70	41	+29	40	
8	Irthlingborough Diamonds reserves	34	16	8	10	47	31	+16	40	Joined Reserve Division
9	Irchester United	34	14	8	12	62	52	+10	36	
10	Geddington Montrose	34	14	6	14	50	57	−7	34	
11	Stewart & Lloyds Corby reserves	34	11	7	16	72	73	−1	29	Joined Reserve Division
12	Newport Pagnell Town	34	11	5	18	49	77	−28	27	
13	Northampton Spencer reserves	34	9	7	18	51	73	−22	25	Joined Reserve Division
14	Rushden Town reserves	34	8	9	17	54	77	−23	25	Joined Reserve Division
15	Desborough Town reserves	34	11	3	20	70	117	−47	25	Joined Reserve Division
16	Ford Sports Daventry	34	9	3	22	50	84	−34	21	
17	Ampthill Town reserves	34	5	4	25	21	80	−59	14	Joined Reserve Division
18	Kempston Rovers reserves	34	2	2	30	27	108	−81	6	Joined Reserve Division

Source: nonleaguematters
Rules for classification: 1) points; 2) goal ratio; 3) number of goals scored.

== Division Two ==
United Counties League Division Two
- Season: 1979–80
- Champions: Cottingham
- Promoted: Cottingham; Sharnbrook; Thrapston Venturas; Burton Park Wanderers; Towcester Town; Raunds Town

The Division Two featured 12 clubs which competed in the division last season, along with 3 new clubs:

- Raunds Town, relegated from Division One
- Cottingham
- Buckingham Town reserves

=== League table ===
Pos	Team	Pld	W	D	L	GF	GA	GD	Pts	Promotion or relegation
1	Cottingham	28	18	7	3	67	20	+47	43	Promoted to Division One
2	Sharnbrook	28	16	8	4	65	24	+41	40	Promoted to Division One
3	Thrapston Venturas	28	15	9	4	51	18	+33	39	Promoted to Division One
4	Long Buckby reserves	28	13	9	6	46	27	+19	35	Joined Reserve Division
5	Burton Park Wanderers	28	13	8	7	64	28	+36	34	Promoted to Division One
6	Rothwell Town reserves	28	12	9	7	50	29	+21	33	Joined Reserve Division
7	Towcester Town	28	12	7	9	54	35	+19	31	Promoted to Division One
8	Raunds Town	28	10	9	9	36	40	−4	29	Promoted to Division One
9	St Neots Town reserves	28	10	7	11	38	49	−11	27	Joined Reserve Division
10	Higham Town reserves	28	9	8	11	46	53	−7	26	Joined Reserve Division
11	Olney Town reserves	28	10	5	13	46	45	+1	25	Joined Reserve Division
12	Buckingham Town reserves	28	6	8	14	28	51	−23	20	Joined Reserve Division
13	Wolverton Town reserves	28	5	7	16	31	53	−22	17	Joined Reserve Division
14	Bedford Avenue	28	4	4	20	28	99	−71	12	Resigned from the league
15	Eynesbury Rovers reserves	28	2	5	21	16	95	−79	9	Joined Reserve Division

Source: nonleaguematters
Rules for classification: 1) points; 2) goal ratio; 3) number of goals scored.
