= 2008–09 United Counties League =

The 2008–09 United Counties League season was the 102nd in the history of the United Counties League, a football competition in England.

== Premier Division ==
United Counties League Premier Division
- Season: 2008–09
- Champions: Stewarts & Lloyds Corby
- Relegated: Potton United
- Matches: 420
- Goals: 1,378 (3.28 per match)

The Premier Division featured 19 clubs which competed in the division last season, along with two new clubs, promoted from Division One:

- Daventry Town
- Rothwell Corinthians

=== League table ===
Pos	Team	Pld	W	D	L	GF	GA	GD	Pts	Promotion or relegation
1	Stewarts & Lloyds Corby	40	27	7	6	95	40	+55	88	
2	Stotfold	40	27	3	10	106	63	+43	84	
3	Newport Pagnell Town	40	24	10	6	84	40	+44	82	
4	Deeping Rangers	40	24	8	8	96	50	+46	80	
5	Boston Town	40	23	11	6	79	51	+28	80	
6	St Ives Town	40	24	7	9	76	44	+32	76 (Note: St Ives Town were deducted three points.)	
7	Daventry Town	40	22	7	11	83	51	+32	70 (Note: Daventry Town were deducted three points.)	
8	Long Buckby	40	20	7	13	78	52	+26	67	
9	Cogenhoe United	40	15	13	12	58	55	+3	58	
10	Raunds Town	40	16	8	16	60	68	−8	56	
11	Desborough Town	40	15	6	19	62	68	−6	51	
12	Northampton Spencer	40	14	9	17	64	71	−7	51	
13	Blackstones	40	13	11	16	60	63	−3	50	
14	Yaxley	40	14	7	19	47	55	−8	49	
15	Sleaford Town	40	13	9	18	57	74	−17	48	
16	Holbeach United	40	12	11	17	56	60	−4	47	
17	St. Neots Town	40	12	7	21	66	75	−9	43	
18	Wellingborough Town	40	7	8	25	30	66	−36	29	
19	Bourne Town	40	6	9	25	47	99	−52	27	
20	Potton United	40	4	7	29	38	116	−78	19	Relegated to Division One
21	Rothwell Corinthians	40	3	5	32	36	117	−81	14	

Source: fchd
Rules for classification: 1) points; 2) goal difference; 3) number of goals scored.

== Division One ==
United Counties League Division One
- Season: 2008–09
- Champions: Peterborough Northern Star
- Promoted: Daventry United
- Matches: 240
- Goals: 908 (3.78 per match)

Division One featured 14 clubs which competed in the division last season, along with two new clubs, relegated from the Premier Division:

- Kempston Rovers
- Wootton Blue Cross

=== League table ===
Pos	Team	Pld	W	D	L	GF	GA	GD	Pts	Promotion
1	Peterborough Northern Star	30	24	2	4	94	24	+70	74	
2	Daventry United	30	19	5	6	81	40	+41	62	Promoted to the Premier Division
3	Northampton Sileby Rangers	30	16	4	10	67	47	+20	52	
4	Northampton ON Chenecks	30	16	3	11	63	52	+11	51	
5	Kempston Rovers	30	13	8	9	66	64	+2	47	
6	Rushden & Higham United	30	11	13	6	50	37	+13	46	
7	Wellingborough Whitworth	30	12	9	9	56	47	+9	45	
8	Buckingham Town	30	14	3	13	56	60	−4	45	
9	Eynesbury Rovers	30	13	10	7	59	48	+11	43 (Note: Eynesbury Rovers were deducted six points.)	
10	Bugbrooke St Michaels	30	10	9	11	61	53	+8	39	
11	Thrapston Town	30	12	5	13	54	58	−4	38 (Note: Thrapston Town were deducted three points.)	
12	Wootton Blue Cross	30	8	5	17	49	71	−22	29	
13	Burton Park Wanderers	30	7	6	17	41	71	−30	27	
14	Huntingdon Town	30	6	8	16	37	62	−25	26	
15	Olney Town	30	8	1	21	41	69	−28	25	
16	Irchester United	30	3	5	22	33	105	−72	14	

Source: fchd
Rules for classification: 1) points; 2) goal difference; 3) number of goals scored.
