= 2007–08 United Counties League =

The 2007–08 United Counties League season was the 101st in the history of the United Counties League, a football competition in England.

== Premier Division ==
United Counties League Premier Division
- Season: 2007–08
- Champions: Stotfold
- Relegated: Wootton Blue Cross; Kempston Rovers
- Matches: 420
- Goals: 1,414 (3.37 per match)

The Premier Division featured 19 clubs which competed in the division last season, along with two new clubs, promoted from Division One:

- Kempston Rovers
- Sleaford Town

=== League table ===
Pos	Team	Pld	W	D	L	GF	GA	GD	Pts	Promotion or relegation
1	Stotfold	40	28	7	5	117	45	+72	91	
2	Long Buckby	40	23	12	5	99	49	+50	81	
3	Desborough Town	40	23	12	5	78	44	+34	81	
4	Blackstones	40	24	7	9	90	50	+40	79	
5	St Ives Town	40	22	8	10	78	59	+19	74	
6	Boston Town	40	21	9	10	73	53	+20	72	
7	Deeping Rangers	40	20	12	8	80	39	+41	69 (Note: Deeping Rangers were deducted three points.)	
8	St. Neots Town	40	16	12	12	67	48	+19	60	
9	Cogenhoe United	40	15	12	13	61	52	+9	57	
10	Wellingborough Town	40	16	8	16	56	52	+4	56	
11	Holbeach United	40	16	7	17	72	73	−1	55	
12	Stewarts & Lloyds Corby	40	15	8	17	65	64	+1	53	
13	Northampton Spencer	40	13	12	15	60	51	+9	51	
14	Sleaford Town	40	15	6	19	73	76	−3	51	
15	Newport Pagnell Town	40	15	6	19	60	73	−13	51	
16	Yaxley	40	11	8	21	51	78	−27	41	
17	Raunds Town	40	9	10	21	58	75	−17	37	
18	Bourne Town	40	9	7	24	49	85	−36	34	
19	Potton United	40	9	5	26	45	90	−45	32	
20	Wootton Blue Cross	40	7	9	24	56	109	−53	30	Relegated to Division One
21	Kempston Rovers	40	3	3	34	26	149	−123	11 (Note: Kempston Rovers were deducted one point.)	Relegated to Division One

Source: fchd
Rules for classification: 1) points; 2) goal difference; 3) number of goals scored.

== Division One ==
United Counties League Division One
- Season: 2007–08
- Champions: Daventry Town
- Promoted: Daventry Town; Rothwell Corinthians
- Matches: 240
- Goals: 872 (3.63 per match)

Division One featured 14 clubs which competed in the division last season, along with two new clubs, relegated from the Premier Division:

- Buckingham Town
- Ford Sports Daventry, who changed name to Daventry United

Also, Higham Town merged with Rushden Rangers to form new club Rushden & Higham United.

=== League table ===
Pos	Team	Pld	W	D	L	GF	GA	GD	Pts	Promotion
1	Daventry Town	30	26	3	1	106	26	+80	81	Promoted to the Premier Division
2	Peterborough Northern Star	30	18	7	5	68	26	+42	61	
3	Rothwell Corinthians	30	15	7	8	60	42	+18	52	Promoted to the Premier Division
4	Huntingdon Town	30	16	4	10	51	40	+11	52	
5	Daventry United	30	16	4	10	67	59	+8	52	
6	Northampton ON Chenecks	30	15	3	12	56	56	0	48	
7	Bugbrooke St Michaels	30	13	4	13	54	47	+7	43	
8	Buckingham Town	30	11	9	10	60	60	0	42	
9	Wellingborough Whitworth	30	11	8	11	63	60	+3	41	
10	Olney Town	30	11	7	12	44	48	−4	40	
11	Thrapston Town	30	11	3	16	52	59	−7	36	
12	Northampton Sileby Rangers	30	9	6	15	47	64	−17	33	
13	Eynesbury Rovers	30	8	8	14	46	67	−21	32	
14	Rushden & Higham United	30	7	6	17	32	51	−19	27	
15	Burton Park Wanderers	30	5	4	21	29	76	−47	19	
16	Irchester United	30	3	7	20	37	91	−54	16	

Source: fchd
Rules for classification: 1) points; 2) goal difference; 3) number of goals scored.
