= 1997–98 United Counties League =

The 1997–98 United Counties League season was the 91st in the history of the United Counties League, a football competition in England.

== Premier Division ==
United Counties League Premier Division
- Season: 1997–98
- Champions: Stamford
- Promoted: Stamford
- Matches: 420
- Goals: 1,359 (3.24 per match)

The Premier Division featured 19 clubs which competed in the division last season, along with two new clubs:

- Buckingham Town, relegated from the Southern Football League
- Yaxley, promoted from Division One

=== League table ===
Pos	Team	Pld	W	D	L	GF	GA	GD	Pts	Promotion or relegation
1	Stamford	40	29	6	5	113	45	+68	93	Promoted to the Southern Football League
2	Northampton Spencer	40	27	2	11	105	59	+46	83	
3	Spalding United	40	24	10	6	77	47	+30	82	
4	Desborough Town	40	23	9	8	89	49	+40	78	
5	Stewarts & Lloyds Corby	40	24	6	10	68	39	+29	78	
6	Ford Sports Daventry	40	22	10	8	74	38	+36	76	
7	Stotfold	40	21	9	10	89	60	+29	72	
8	Boston Town	40	23	6	11	82	48	+34	75	
9	Mirrlees Blackstone	40	20	7	13	69	50	+19	67	
10	St. Neots Town	40	20	3	17	67	60	+7	63	
11	Buckingham Town	40	18	7	15	58	49	+9	61	
12	Cogenhoe United	40	17	9	14	68	53	+15	60	
13	Long Buckby	40	14	8	18	64	68	−4	50	
14	Potton United	40	11	10	19	46	62	−16	43	
15	Wellingborough Town	40	11	5	24	46	77	−31	38	
16	Holbeach United	40	10	8	22	39	76	−37	38	
17	Wootton Blue Cross	40	9	6	25	53	99	−46	33	
18	Yaxley	40	9	3	28	57	102	−45	30	
19	Bourne Town	40	8	5	27	48	96	−48	29	
20	Eynesbury Rovers	40	6	10	24	29	72	−43	28	
21	Kempston Rovers	40	2	5	33	18	110	−92	11	

Source: fchd
Rules for classification: 1) points; 2) goal difference; 3) number of goals scored.

== Division One ==
United Counties League Division One
- Season: 1997–98
- Champions: Higham Town
- Matches: 306
- Goals: 1,257 (4.11 per match)

Division One featured 17 clubs which competed in the division last season, along with one new club:

- Newport Pagnell Town, relegated from the Premier Division

=== League table ===
Pos	Team	Pld	W	D	L	GF	GA	GD	Pts	Promotion
1	Higham Town	34	26	4	4	91	23	+68	82	
2	Cottingham	34	23	4	7	84	40	+44	73	
3	Harrowby United	34	20	4	10	94	61	+33	64	
4	Bugbrooke St Michaels	34	18	7	9	90	47	+43	61	
5	Blisworth	34	19	4	11	73	54	+19	61	
6	Wellingborough Whitworth	34	17	5	12	78	55	+23	56	
7	Daventry Town	34	16	5	13	87	66	+21	53	
8	St Ives Town	34	15	7	12	66	57	+9	52	
9	Newport Pagnell Town	34	16	4	14	61	56	+5	52	
10	Rothwell Corinthians	34	14	8	12	77	58	+19	50	
11	Olney Town	34	15	5	14	65	55	+10	50	
12	Northampton Vanaid	34	14	5	15	90	54	+36	47	
13	Thrapston Town	34	12	7	15	74	59	+15	43	
14	Burton Park Wanderers	34	13	3	18	58	71	−13	42	
15	Northampton ON Chenecks	34	10	8	16	54	61	−7	38	
16	Irchester United	34	7	5	22	43	85	−42	26	
17	Sharnbrook	34	6	4	24	50	82	−32	22	
18	Huntingdon United	34	0	1	33	22	273	−251	1	Resigned from the league

Source: fchd
Rules for classification: 1) points; 2) goal difference; 3) number of goals scored.
