= 1994–95 United Counties League =

The 1994–95 United Counties League season was the 88th in the history of the United Counties League, a football competition in England

== Premier Division ==
United Counties League Premier Division
- Season: 1994–95
- Champions: Boston Town
- Matches: 342
- Goals: 1,066 (3.12 per match)

The Premier Division featured 19 clubs which competed in the division last season. No new clubs joined the division this season. But Boston changed name to Boston Town.

=== League table ===
Pos	Team	Pld	W	D	L	GF	GA	GD	Pts
1	Boston Town	36	25	5	6	92	36	+56	80
2	Raunds Town	36	23	11	2	82	42	+40	80
3	Cogenhoe United	36	24	5	7	90	37	+53	77
4	Holbeach United	36	18	9	9	56	39	+17	63
5	Northampton Spencer	36	17	8	11	69	47	+22	59
6	Eynesbury Rovers	36	15	11	10	53	41	+12	56
7	Mirrlees Blackstone	36	14	10	12	53	52	+1	52
8	Bourne Town	36	14	9	13	53	68	−15	51
9	Stotfold	36	12	13	11	50	41	+9	49
10	Spalding United	36	11	12	13	57	54	+3	45
11	Desborough Town	36	11	12	13	53	60	−7	45
12	Long Buckby	36	9	16	11	58	61	−3	43
13	Wootton Blue Cross	36	10	10	16	47	59	−12	40
14	Potton United	36	11	6	19	46	69	−23	39
15	Stamford	36	9	9	18	50	69	−19	36
16	Newport Pagnell Town	36	8	12	16	31	54	−23	36
17	Stewarts & Lloyds Corby	36	8	10	18	40	65	−25	34
18	Wellingborough Town	36	5	10	21	40	84	−44	25
19	Kempston Rovers	36	4	10	22	46	88	−42	22

Source: fchd
Rules for classification: 1) points; 2) goal difference; 3) number of goals scored.

== Division One ==
United Counties League Division One
- Season: 1994–95
- Champions: St Neots Town
- Promoted: St Neots Town
- Matches: 342
- Goals: 1,403 (4.1 per match)

Division One featured 17 clubs which competed in the division last season, along with two new clubs:

- Daventry Town, demoted from the Premier Division
- St Neots Town, joined from the Huntingdonshire League

=== League table ===
Pos	Team	Pld	W	D	L	GF	GA	GD	Pts	Promotion
1	St Neots Town	36	28	3	5	119	41	+78	87	Promoted to the Premier Division
2	Higham Town	36	27	4	5	92	31	+61	85	
3	Thrapston Venturas	36	25	7	4	107	44	+63	82	
4	Northampton Vanaid	36	24	4	8	132	51	+81	76	
5	Wellingborough Whitworth	36	23	5	8	115	45	+70	74	
6	Bugbrooke St Michaels	36	22	6	8	84	43	+41	72	
7	St Ives Town	36	17	10	9	92	53	+39	61	
8	Olney Town	36	16	8	12	75	60	+15	56	
9	Northampton ON Chenecks	36	15	9	12	76	57	+19	54	
10	Blisworth	36	13	7	16	74	81	−7	46	
11	Ford Sports Daventry	36	13	6	17	86	81	+5	45	
12	Ramsey Town	36	12	7	17	66	76	−10	43	
13	Burton Park Wanderers	36	12	4	20	59	91	−32	40	
14	Sharnbrook	36	11	6	19	46	79	−33	39	
15	British Timken	36	7	8	21	38	92	−54	29	Resigned from the league
16	Irchester United	36	6	9	21	40	86	−46	27	
17	Cottingham	36	5	6	25	44	84	−40	21	
18	Harrowby United	36	5	2	29	24	171	−147	17	
19	Daventry Town	36	3	5	28	34	137	−103	14	

Source: fchd
Rules for classification: 1) points; 2) goal difference; 3) number of goals scored.
