= 1981–82 United Counties League =

The 1981–82 United Counties League season was the 75th in the history of the United Counties League, a football competition in England.

== Premier Division ==
United Counties League Premier Division
- Season: 1981–82
- Champions: Stamford
- Relegated: St Neots Town
- Matches: 342
- Goals: 1,019 (2.98 per match)

The Premier Division featured 17 clubs which competed in the division last season, along with two new clubs, promoted from Division One:

- British Timken Duston
- Stevenage Borough

=== League table ===
Pos	Team	Pld	W	D	L	GF	GA	GD	Pts	Promotion or relegation
1	Stamford	36	25	5	6	71	28	+43	55	
2	Irthlingborough Diamonds	36	23	8	5	73	34	+39	54	
3	Rushden Town	36	19	7	10	61	32	+29	45	
4	Buckingham Town	36	19	7	10	63	43	+20	45	
5	Bourne Town	36	18	7	11	64	44	+20	43	
6	Potton United	36	15	11	10	41	30	+11	41	
7	Ampthill Town	36	14	11	11	73	67	+6	39	
8	Long Buckby	36	14	10	12	57	60	−3	38	
9	Holbeach United	36	14	9	13	53	46	+7	37	
10	Wootton Blue Cross	36	14	9	13	57	58	−1	37	
11	Kempston Rovers	36	13	10	13	63	62	+1	36	
12	Stevenage Borough	36	12	9	15	50	49	+1	33	
13	Desborough Town	36	10	13	13	47	55	−8	33	
14	Stewart & Lloyds Corby	36	10	12	14	46	57	−11	32	
15	Rothwell Town	36	12	6	18	58	60	−2	30	
16	British Timken Duston	36	11	8	17	46	67	−21	30	Demoted to Division One
17	Eynesbury Rovers	36	8	9	19	35	58	−23	25	
18	Wolverton Town	36	8	4	24	36	78	−42	20	Transferred to the London Spartan League
19	St Neots Town	36	2	7	27	25	91	−66	11	Relegated to Division One

Source: nonleaguematters
Rules for classification: 1) points; 2) goal difference; 3) number of goals scored.

== Division One ==
United Counties League Division One
- Season: 1981–82
- Champions: Newport Pagnell Town
- Promoted: Newport Pagnell Town
- Matches: 210
- Goals: 655 (3.12 per match)

Division One featured 14 clubs which competed in the division last season, along with one new club, relegated from the Premier Division:

- Northampton Spencer

=== League table ===
Pos	Team	Pld	W	D	L	GF	GA	GD	Pts	Promotion
1	Newport Pagnell Town	28	21	6	1	61	18	+43	48	Promoted to the Premier Division
2	Cottingham	28	17	7	4	58	29	+29	41	
3	Raunds Town	28	16	8	4	59	22	+37	40	
4	British Timken Athletic	28	13	9	6	60	36	+24	35	
5	Towcester Town	28	10	9	9	47	40	+7	29	
6	Olney Town	28	11	7	10	45	48	−3	29	
7	Corby Gainsborough	28	13	3	12	40	46	−6	29	
8	Irchester Eastfield	28	11	6	11	51	40	+11	28	
9	Thrapston Venturas	28	12	2	14	42	38	+4	26	
10	Higham Town	28	9	7	12	40	51	−11	25	
11	Northampton ON Chenecks	28	7	6	15	31	54	−23	20	
12	Ford Sports Daventry	28	6	8	14	27	52	−25	20	
13	Burton Park Wanderers	28	4	10	14	28	48	−20	18	
14	Sharnbrook	28	5	8	15	30	56	−26	18	
15	Northampton Spencer	28	4	6	18	36	77	−41	14	

Source: nonleaguematters
Rules for classification: 1) points; 2) goal difference; 3) number of goals scored.
