= 2009–10 United Counties League =

The 2009–10 United Counties League season was the 103rd in the history of the United Counties League, a football competition in England.

== Premier Division ==
United Counties League Premier Division
- Season: 2009–10
- Champions: Daventry Town
- Promoted: Daventry Town
- Matches: 420
- Goals: 1,332 (3.17 per match)

The Premier Division featured 20 clubs which competed in the division last season, along with one new club:

- Daventry United, promoted from Division One

=== League table ===
Pos	Team	Pld	W	D	L	GF	GA	GD	Pts	Promotion or relegation
1	Daventry Town	40	33	3	4	120	28	+92	102	Promoted to the Southern Football League
2	St. Neots Town	40	29	8	3	83	26	+57	95	
3	Long Buckby	40	25	4	11	86	50	+36	79	
4	Deeping Rangers	40	23	6	11	73	53	+20	75	
5	Boston Town	40	21	7	12	70	50	+20	70	
6	Newport Pagnell Town	40	19	9	12	79	48	+31	66	
7	Stotfold	40	20	8	12	80	60	+20	65 (Note: Stotfold were deducted three points.)	Transferred to the Spartan South Midlands League
8	Cogenhoe United	40	16	13	11	62	42	+20	61	
9	Sleaford Town	40	17	9	14	78	70	+8	60	
10	St Ives Town	40	18	7	15	53	47	+6	58 (Note: St Ives Town were deducted three points.)	
11	Wellingborough Town	40	16	8	16	52	62	−10	56	
12	Stewarts & Lloyds Corby	40	14	12	14	64	65	−1	54	
13	Blackstones	40	14	6	20	64	75	−11	48	
14	Northampton Spencer	40	13	8	19	49	66	−17	47	
15	Daventry United	40	14	5	21	48	78	−30	47	
16	Holbeach United	40	12	8	20	56	74	−18	44	
17	Bourne Town	40	11	9	20	57	87	−30	42	Demoted to Division One
18	Desborough Town	40	8	7	25	53	89	−36	31	
19	Yaxley	40	8	6	26	37	76	−39	30	
20	Raunds Town	40	7	5	28	29	84	−55	26	
21	Rothwell Corinthians	40	6	4	30	39	102	−63	22	

Source: fchd
Rules for classification: 1) points; 2) goal difference; 3) number of goals scored.

== Division One ==
United Counties League Division One
- Season: 2009–10
- Champions: Irchester United
- Promoted: Irchester United; Peterborough Northern Star
- Matches: 240
- Goals: 910 (3.79 per match)

Division One featured 15 clubs which competed in the division last season, along with one new club:

- Potton United, relegated from the Premier Division

=== League table ===
Pos	Team	Pld	W	D	L	GF	GA	GD	Pts	Promotion
1	Irchester United	30	23	1	6	72	30	+42	70	Promoted to the Premier Division
2	Peterborough Northern Star	30	21	5	4	78	27	+51	68	Promoted to the Premier Division
3	Eynesbury Rovers	30	21	4	5	80	47	+33	66 (Note: Eynesbury Rovers were deducted one point.)	
4	Northampton ON Chenecks	30	19	3	8	66	40	+26	60	
5	Kempston Rovers	30	17	5	8	73	41	+32	55 (Note: Kempston Rovers were deducted one point.)	
6	Thrapston Town	30	13	9	8	55	47	+8	48	
7	Bugbrooke St Michaels	30	14	5	11	71	64	+7	47	
8	Huntingdon Town	30	12	7	11	48	57	−9	43	
9	Northampton Sileby Rangers	30	11	8	11	79	64	+15	41	
10	Wootton Blue Cross	30	9	7	14	43	62	−19	34	
11	Potton United	30	8	8	14	50	61	−11	32	
12	Wellingborough Whitworth	30	6	10	14	59	67	−8	28	
13	Buckingham Town	30	5	6	19	36	73	−37	21	
14	Olney Town	30	6	3	21	38	81	−43	21	
15	Burton Park Wanderers	30	4	7	19	32	76	−44	19	
16	Rushden & Higham United	30	4	6	20	30	73	−43	18	

Source: fchd
Rules for classification: 1) points; 2) goal difference; 3) number of goals scored.
