= 1980–81 United Counties League =

The 1980–81 United Counties League season was the 74th in the history of the United Counties League, a football competition in England. At the end of the previous season reserve teams from Division One were transferred to newly established reserve division, they were replaced by clubs from Division Two.

== Premier Division ==
United Counties League Premier Division
- Season: 1980–81
- Champions: Stamford
- Relegated: Northampton Spencer
- Matches: 306
- Goals: 986 (3.22 per match)

The Premier Division featured 18 clubs which competed in the division last season, no new clubs joined the division this season.

=== League table ===
Pos	Team	Pld	W	D	L	GF	GA	GD	Pts	Promotion or relegation
1	Stamford	34	22	9	3	76	36	+40	53	
2	Wootton Blue Cross	34	23	4	7	81	33	+48	50	
3	Kempston Rovers	34	22	3	9	96	54	+42	47	
4	Holbeach United	34	21	5	8	59	43	+16	47	
5	Desborough Town	34	18	9	7	79	55	+24	45	
6	Potton United	34	15	8	11	48	41	+7	38	
7	Rushden Town	34	16	7	11	57	33	+24	39	
8	Long Buckby	34	15	12	7	70	54	+16	42	
9	Irthlingborough Diamonds	34	15	5	14	60	54	+6	35	
10	Stewart & Lloyds Corby	34	13	9	12	53	51	+2	35	
11	Buckingham Town	34	13	8	13	48	45	+3	34	
12	Wolverton Town	34	11	9	14	49	70	−21	31	
13	St Neots Town	34	9	6	19	35	61	−26	24	
14	Bourne Town	34	7	9	18	41	64	−23	23	
15	Rothwell Town	34	6	10	18	37	58	−21	22	
16	Ampthill Town	34	6	10	18	39	69	−30	22	
17	Eynesbury Rovers	34	7	7	20	37	71	−34	21	
18	Northampton Spencer	34	1	2	31	21	94	−73	4	Relegated to Division One

Source: nonleaguematters
Rules for classification: 1) points; 2) goal difference; 3) number of goals scored.

== Division One ==
United Counties League Division One
- Season: 1980–81
- Champions: Stevenage Borough
- Promoted: Stevenage Borough; British Timken Duston
- Matches: 272
- Goals: 976 (3.59 per match)

Division One featured nine clubs which competed in the division last season, along with eight new clubs.

- Clubs joined from Division Two:
  - Burton Park Wanderers
  - Cottingham
  - Raunds Town
  - Sharnbrook
  - Thrapston Venturas
  - Towcester Town
- Plus:
  - Olney Town, relegated from the Premier Division
  - Stevenage Borough, new club

Also, Irchester United changed name to Irchester Eastfield.

=== League table ===
Pos	Team	Pld	W	D	L	GF	GA	GD	Pts	Promotion
1	Stevenage Borough	32	23	7	2	106	35	+71	53	Promoted to the Premier Division
2	British Timken Duston	32	21	5	6	68	31	+37	47	Promoted to the Premier Division
3	Newport Pagnell Town	32	19	6	7	62	32	+30	44	
4	Northampton ON Chenecks	32	15	10	7	51	44	+7	40	
5	Cottingham	32	16	6	10	59	49	+10	38	
6	Corby Gainsborough	32	14	7	11	65	46	+19	35	
7	Towcester Town	32	14	6	12	79	58	+21	34	
8	Raunds Town	32	11	10	11	62	55	+7	32	
9	Irchester Eastfield	32	11	9	12	54	58	−4	31	
10	Thrapston Venturas	32	11	8	13	54	52	+2	30	
11	Higham Town	32	10	7	15	61	67	−6	27	
12	Olney Town	32	10	6	16	56	79	−23	26	
13	Ford Sports Daventry	32	8	8	16	37	75	−38	24	
14	British Timken Athletic	32	9	5	18	40	75	−35	23	
15	Sharnbrook	32	9	4	19	39	60	−21	22	
16	Burton Park Wanderers	32	9	4	19	40	67	−27	22	
17	Geddington Montrose	32	6	4	22	43	93	−50	16	Resigned from the league

Source: nonleaguematters
Rules for classification: 1) points; 2) goal difference; 3) number of goals scored.
