= 1983–84 United Counties League =

The 1983–84 United Counties League season was the 77th in the history of the United Counties League, a football competition in England.

== Premier Division ==
United Counties League Premier Division
- Season: 1983–84
- Champions: Buckingham Town
- Matches: 342
- Goals: 1,006 (2.94 per match)

The Premier Division featured 16 clubs which competed in the division last season, along with three new clubs:

- Baldock Town, transferred from the South Midlands League
- Raunds Town, promoted from Division One
- St Neots Town, promoted from Division One

=== League table ===
Pos	Team	Pld	W	D	L	GF	GA	GD	Pts	Promotion or relegation
1	Buckingham Town	36	26	6	4	77	24	+53	58	
2	Baldock Town	36	21	8	7	78	42	+36	50	
3	Stamford	36	18	11	7	75	42	+33	47	
4	Bourne Town	36	19	8	9	66	49	+17	46	
5	Potton United	36	13	16	7	50	39	+11	42	
6	Stevenage Borough	36	16	9	11	52	46	+6	41	Transferred to the Isthmian League Division Two North
7	Irthlingborough Diamonds	36	15	10	11	59	40	+19	40	
8	Long Buckby	36	13	13	10	55	48	+7	39	
9	Wootton Blue Cross	36	13	11	12	56	49	+7	37	
10	Ampthill Town	36	13	10	13	56	54	+2	36	
11	Arlesey Town	36	12	12	12	45	56	−11	36	
12	Newport Pagnell Town	36	11	11	14	40	50	−10	33	
13	Rothwell Town	36	11	10	15	52	58	−6	32	
14	Raunds Town	36	10	10	16	56	68	−12	30	
15	Holbeach United	36	12	6	18	44	68	−24	30	
16	Eynesbury Rovers	36	10	9	17	51	74	−23	29	
17	Stewart & Lloyds Corby	36	7	7	22	34	63	−29	21	
18	Desborough Town	36	5	10	21	32	62	−30	20	
19	St Neots Town	36	3	11	22	28	74	−46	17	

Source: nonleaguematters
Rules for classification: 1) points; 2) goal difference; 3) number of goals scored.

== Division One ==
United Counties League Division One
- Season: 1983–84
- Champions: Brackley Town
- Promoted: Brackley Town
- Matches: 240
- Goals: 715 (2.98 per match)

Division One featured 14 clubs which competed in the division last season, along with two new clubs:

- Brackley Town, transferred from the Hellenic League
- Kempston Rovers, relegated from the Premier Division

=== League table ===
Pos	Team	Pld	W	D	L	GF	GA	GD	Pts	Promotion
1	Brackley Town	30	22	6	2	70	21	+49	50	Promoted to the Premier Division
2	British Timken Duston	30	19	8	3	62	15	+47	46	
3	Kempston Rovers	30	19	6	5	56	26	+30	44	
4	British Timken Athletic	30	18	7	5	65	28	+37	43	
5	Cottingham	30	14	10	6	57	30	+27	38	
6	Northampton Spencer	30	15	5	10	57	36	+21	35	
7	Thrapston Venturas	30	13	9	8	49	39	+10	35	
8	Irchester Eastfield	30	9	11	10	38	48	−10	29	
9	Higham Town	30	9	10	11	37	33	+4	28	
10	Burton Park Wanderers	30	10	5	15	40	56	−16	25	
11	Northampton ON Chenecks	30	9	5	16	43	64	−21	23	
12	Towcester Town	30	8	6	16	33	52	−19	22	
13	Corby Gainsborough	30	8	6	16	33	60	−27	22	
14	Ford Sports Daventry	30	3	11	16	36	65	−29	17	
15	Olney Town	30	4	6	20	23	66	−43	14	
16	Sharnbrook	30	2	5	23	16	76	−60	9	

Source: nonleaguematters
Rules for classification: 1) points; 2) goal difference; 3) number of goals scored.
