= 1982–83 United Counties League =

The 1982–83 United Counties League season was the 76th in the history of the United Counties League, a football competition in England.

== Premier Division ==
United Counties League Premier Division
- Season: 1982–83
- Champions: Irthlingborough Diamonds
- Promoted: Rushden Town
- Relegated: Kempston Rovers
- Matches: 306
- Goals: 902 (2.95 per match)

The Premier Division featured 16 clubs which competed in the division last season, along with two new clubs:

- Arlesey Town, transferred from the South Midlands League
- Newport Pagnell Town, promoted from Division One

=== League table ===
Pos	Team	Pld	W	D	L	GF	GA	GD	Pts	Promotion or relegation
1	Irthlingborough Diamonds	34	19	11	4	61	27	+34	49	
2	Rushden Town	34	19	9	6	65	38	+27	47	Promoted to the Southern Football League
3	Stamford	34	14	13	7	46	40	+6	41	
4	Bourne Town	34	14	12	8	55	40	+15	40	
5	Potton United	34	13	13	8	48	36	+12	39	
6	Desborough Town	34	16	6	12	58	46	+12	38	
7	Long Buckby	34	13	12	9	56	44	+12	38	
8	Wootton Blue Cross	34	12	13	9	61	55	+6	37	
9	Arlesey Town	34	14	9	11	49	48	+1	37	
10	Buckingham Town	34	13	8	13	42	51	−9	34	
11	Newport Pagnell Town	34	7	17	10	42	41	+1	31	
12	Stevenage Borough	34	10	10	14	51	56	−5	30	
13	Holbeach United	34	9	11	14	60	55	+5	29	
14	Stewart & Lloyds Corby	34	9	11	14	44	54	−10	29	
15	Rothwell Town	34	10	9	15	40	55	−15	29	
16	Ampthill Town	34	10	7	17	57	66	−9	27	
17	Eynesbury Rovers	34	7	8	19	28	60	−32	22	
18	Kempston Rovers	34	4	7	23	39	90	−51	15	Relegated to Division One

Source: nonleaguematters
Rules for classification: 1) points; 2) goal difference; 3) number of goals scored.

== Division One ==
United Counties League Division One
- Season: 1982–83
- Champions: Raunds Town
- Promoted: Raunds Town; St Neots Town
- Matches: 240
- Goals: 822 (3.43 per match)

Division One featured 14 clubs which competed in the division last season, along with two new clubs, relegated from the Premier Division:

- British Timken Duston
- St Neots Town

=== League table ===
Pos	Team	Pld	W	D	L	GF	GA	GD	Pts	Promotion
1	Raunds Town	30	20	5	5	81	34	+47	45	Promoted to the Premier Division
2	St Neots Town	30	16	10	4	55	24	+31	42	Promoted to the Premier Division
3	Northampton Spencer	30	16	7	7	62	41	+21	39	
4	Corby Gainsborough	30	15	7	8	59	39	+20	37	
5	British Timken Athletic	30	15	7	8	66	54	+12	37	
6	British Timken Duston	30	13	10	7	56	32	+24	36	
7	Irchester Eastfield	30	14	6	10	63	46	+17	34	
8	Thrapston Venturas	30	13	7	10	51	41	+10	33	
9	Olney Town	30	13	6	11	72	51	+21	32	
10	Towcester Town	30	10	8	12	43	45	−2	28	
11	Ford Sports Daventry	30	9	9	12	51	53	−2	27	
12	Higham Town	30	11	4	15	40	58	−18	26	
13	Cottingham	30	9	5	16	38	49	−11	23	
14	Northampton ON Chenecks	30	6	5	19	29	70	−41	17	
15	Sharnbrook	30	5	5	20	27	75	−48	15	
16	Burton Park Wanderers	30	2	5	23	29	110	−81	9	

Source: nonleaguematters
Rules for classification: 1) points; 2) goal difference; 3) number of goals scored.
