= 1984–85 United Counties League =

The 1984–85 United Counties League season was the 78th in the history of the United Counties League, a football competition in England.

== Premier Division ==
United Counties League Premier Division
- Season: 1984–85
- Champions: Arlesey Town
- Matches: 380
- Goals: 1,198 (3.15 per match)

The Premier Division featured 18 clubs which competed in the division last season, along with two new clubs:

- Brackley Town, promoted from Division One
- Stotfold, transferred from the South Midlands League

=== League table ===
Pos	Team	Pld	W	D	L	GF	GA	GD	Pts
1	Arlesey Town	38	22	10	6	86	34	+52	54
2	Long Buckby	38	22	9	7	93	52	+41	53
3	Buckingham Town	38	22	7	9	90	39	+51	51
4	Irthlingborough Diamonds	38	18	11	9	78	41	+37	47
5	Stamford	38	18	9	11	75	56	+19	45
6	Desborough Town	38	18	9	11	66	63	+3	45
7	Potton United	38	15	12	11	62	53	+9	42
8	Baldock Town	38	15	11	12	51	45	+6	41
9	Wootton Blue Cross	38	16	7	15	50	49	+1	39
10	Bourne Town	38	14	10	14	48	64	−16	38
11	Stewart & Lloyds Corby	38	14	6	18	56	59	−3	34
12	Newport Pagnell Town	38	13	8	17	40	54	−14	34
13	Raunds Town	38	15	3	20	47	61	−14	33
14	Stotfold	38	11	10	17	41	54	−13	32
15	Rothwell Town	38	12	8	18	49	66	−17	32
16	Brackley Town	38	10	11	17	72	78	−6	31
17	Eynesbury Rovers	38	11	9	18	61	89	−28	31
18	Holbeach United	38	12	6	20	55	73	−18	30
19	St Neots Town	38	11	5	22	37	77	−40	27
20	Ampthill Town	38	7	7	24	41	91	−50	21

Source: nonleaguematters
Rules for classification: 1) points; 2) goal difference; 3) number of goals scored.

== Division One ==
United Counties League Division One
- Season: 1984–85
- Champions: Northampton Spencer
- Promoted: Northampton Spencer
- Matches: 240
- Goals: 765 (3.19 per match)

Division One featured 15 clubs which competed in the division last season, along with one new club:

- Mirrlees Blackstone, joined from the Peterborough and District League

=== League table ===
Pos	Team	Pld	W	D	L	GF	GA	GD	Pts	Promotion
1	Northampton Spencer	30	23	4	3	60	21	+39	50	Promoted to the Premier Division
2	Towcester Town	30	21	5	4	76	30	+46	47	
3	Cottingham	30	18	6	6	52	23	+29	42	
4	Mirrlees Blackstone	30	19	2	9	59	44	+15	40	
5	Kempston Rovers	30	16	5	9	58	38	+20	37	
6	Corby Gainsborough	30	13	6	11	38	40	−2	32	
7	British Timken Duston	30	13	3	14	60	54	+6	29	
8	Higham Town	30	13	3	14	53	54	−1	29	
9	Northampton ON Chenecks	30	11	7	12	37	43	−6	29	
10	Thrapston Venturas	30	9	7	14	35	63	−28	25	
11	Ford Sports Daventry	30	8	7	15	48	54	−6	23	
12	Sharnbrook	30	9	5	16	37	50	−13	23	
13	Irchester Eastfield	30	7	7	16	43	58	−15	21	
14	Burton Park Wanderers	30	7	6	17	39	60	−21	20	
15	British Timken Athletic	30	9	1	20	40	66	−26	19	
16	Olney Town	30	4	6	20	30	67	−37	14	

Source: nonleaguematters
Rules for classification: 1) points; 2) goal difference; 3) number of goals scored.
