= Conor Washington =

Northern Irish professional footballer

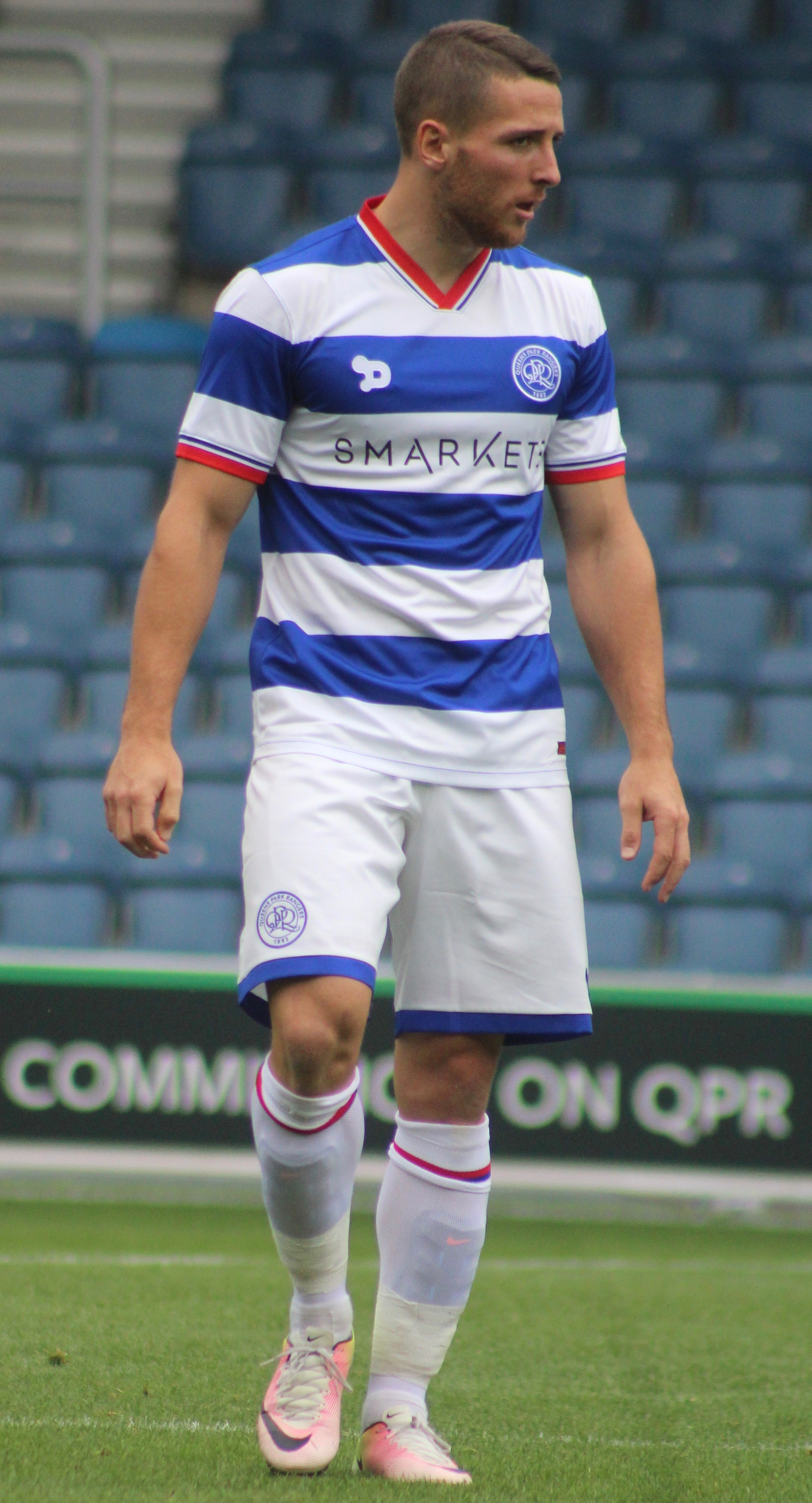
- Washington playing for Queens Park Rangers in 2016

Personal information
- Full name: Conor James Washington
- Date of birth: 18 May 1992 (age 34)
- Place of birth: Chatham, Kent, England
- Height: 5 ft 10 in (1.78 m)
- Position: Striker

Team information
- Current team: Matlock Town

Youth career
- 2008–2009: St Ives Town

Senior career*
Years	Team	Apps	(Gls)
2009–2012	St Ives Town	88	(65)
2012–2014	Newport County	39	(5)
2014–2016	Peterborough United	82	(27)
2016–2018	Queens Park Rangers	92	(13)
2018–2019	Sheffield United	15	(0)
2019–2020	Heart of Midlothian	15	(3)
2020–2022	Charlton Athletic	71	(22)
2022–2023	Rotherham United	35	(5)
2023–2025	Derby County	19	(3)
2025–	Matlock Town	39	(25)

International career^{‡}
2016–2023	Northern Ireland	43	(6)
- * Club domestic league appearances and goals as of 13 April 2026 (UTC) ‡ National team caps and goals as of 23:12, 10 September 2023 (UTC)

Conor James Washington (born 18 May 1992) is a professional footballer who plays as a striker for Northern Premier League Division One East club Matlock Town. Born in England, he represented the Northern Ireland national team.

Washington began his career in non-league football with St. Ives Town, joining Newport County for £5,000 in 2012. After helping them return to The Football League via the play-offs, he transferred to Peterborough United in January 2014. Two years later, he signed for Queens Park Rangers for an undisclosed fee. In 2018, after leaving by mutual consent, he joined Sheffield United. Washington moved to Scottish club Hearts in June 2019. After spending one season with Hearts, he signed for Charlton Athletic in August 2020. In May 2022, Washington would join Rotherham United, before signing with Derby County in July 2023, leaving the club in June 2025.

Born in England, Washington qualified for Northern Ireland through a grandparent. He made his senior debut for the Northern Ireland national team in March 2016 and was chosen for their UEFA Euro 2016 squad.

== Early and personal life ==
Born in Chatham, Kent, England, Washington was eligible to play for Scotland through his mother, and through a grandmother to play for Northern Ireland. After his parents moved to St Ives, Cambridgeshire during his childhood, he began to show his scoring capability by winning trophies as part of the Westfield Junior School squad. After leaving school, he was turned down for an apprenticeship by both Norwich City and Peterborough United. He subsequently worked as a postman for the Royal Mail, whilst developing his football as a striker for St. Ives Town, scoring 52 goals in 50 matches in the United Counties League, Premier Division.

== Club career ==
=== Newport County ===
Washington joined Newport County on 1 October 2012 for a fee of £5,000, after being spotted by their manager Justin Edinburgh. He made his debut 26 days later in a 3–2 home loss to Woking, replacing Ben Swallow for the final nine minutes. The only goal of his 15 appearances in his first season was the game's only on 9 April 2013 against Braintree Town at Rodney Parade. Newport finished 3rd in the Conference Premier and reached the play-offs, though he was not selected in the matchday squad for the playoff final which Newport won 2–0 against Wrexham at Wembley Stadium to return to the Football League after a 25-year absence.

Washington made his Football League debut in League Two versus Accrington Stanley on 3 August 2013, and his League Cup debut in the first round at Brighton & Hove Albion three days later, scoring the third goal in Newport's 3–1 win. His first Football League goal came on 10 August in County's 3–1 reverse at Northampton Town.

=== Peterborough United ===
On 28 January 2014, Washington joined Peterborough United for an undisclosed fee, with Shaun Jeffers moving the other way as part of the deal. As part of the deal, Newport retained a 20% sell-on clause.

He made his debut for the Posh on 8 February, replacing Jack Payne for the final 17 minutes of a 2–1 win away to Leyton Orient. His first goal in League One came on 8 March, concluding a 4–2 victory over Crewe Alexandra at London Road; he assisted two further goals. Washington scored three more goals over the season, including two in a win of the same score at Shrewsbury Town on 26 April, and added another in the play-off semi-final defeat to Orient. He was however cup-tied for their victory in the 2013-14 Football League Trophy.

On 7 November 2015, Washington scored the first two goals of a 3–0 win away to Burton Albion in the first round of the FA Cup, and three weeks later he added his first professional hat-trick in a 4–0 victory at Scunthorpe United.

=== Queens Park Rangers ===
On 19 January 2016, Washington joined Queens Park Rangers on a three-and-a-half-year deal for an undisclosed fee that was reported to be between £2.5m and £3m. Four days later, he made his debut by replacing Junior Hoilett with seven minutes remaining in a 1–1 home draw against Wolverhampton Wanderers.

After failing to score a goal in his first season at Loftus Road, Washington scored his first goal for the club in extra time of a League Cup first round match at home to Swindon Town on 10 August 2016, putting his team 2–1 ahead. The game ended 2–2 and he scored in their 4–2 penalty shootout victory. On 1 October, he scored his first league goal for QPR, opening a 2–1 win at Fulham in a West London derby.

On 5 August 2017, in the first game of the new Championship season, Washington scored both goals in a 2–0 home win over Reading.

=== Sheffield United ===
On 31 August 2018, Washington left QPR after his contract was cancelled by mutual consent and joined fellow Championship club Sheffield United on a one-year contract. He made his debut for the club the following day as an 81st-minute substitute for Billy Sharp during a 4–1 home win against Aston Villa. He was released by Sheffield United at the end of the 2018–19 season.

=== Hearts ===
Washington signed a two-year contract with Scottish Premiership club Heart of Midlothian in June 2019. He made his debut on 12 July, playing the full 90 minutes of a Scottish League Cup 1–1 home draw with Dundee United. On 16 August he scored his first goal in the last 16 of the same competition, a penalty to win 2–1 at Motherwell; it was his first career goal since February 2018. Nine days later he scored his first Premiership goal, a consolation as Hearts lost 3–1 at champions Celtic. In September, he was ruled out for three months with a hamstring injury.

=== Charlton Athletic ===
On 13 August 2020, Washington joined League One club Charlton Athletic on a two-year deal. He scored on his debut for Charlton against Crewe Alexandra on 12 September 2020.

On 10 May 2022, it was confirmed that Washington would leave Charlton Athletic when his contract expired.

=== Rotherham United ===
On 27 May 2022, Washington signed for newly promoted Championship club Rotherham United on a two-year deal.

=== Derby County ===
On 7 July 2023, Washington signed for Derby County after it was announced that the club had reached an "undisclosed agreement" with Rotherham for his transfer. Washington made his debut for Derby against Wigan Athletic on 5 August 2023. His first Derby goal came at Burton Albion on 12 August 2023, coming on as a late substitute and scoring the final goal in a 3–0 win. In late November 2023, Washington damaged two ankle ligaments on international duty with Northern Ireland, with Washington expected to be on the sidelines for three months as he required surgery on the injury. Derby head coach Paul Warne described the injury as a "massive blow" with the striker being in good form. Washington returned to training on 14 March 2024. Washington made 22 appearances during his first season for Derby, scoring three times, as Derby finished second in League One, securing promotion to the Championship.

For the duration of the 2024–25 season, Washington did not make an appearance for the first team due to injuries and falling further down the pecking order of strikers at the club.

On 16 May 2025; it was announced by Derby County the Washington's contract would not be renewed upon its expiry in June 2025; he played 22 times for Derby, scoring three times in his two seasons at the club.

=== Matlock Town ===
On 18 July 2025, Washington joined Northern Premier League Division One East side Matlock Town.

== International career ==
Washington received his first call-up to the senior Northern Ireland squad on 16 March 2016 for friendlies against Wales and Slovenia; he had only been to the area once, for a Peterborough friendly. He made his debut against Wales on the 24th, and four days later he scored his first goal in a 1–0 victory over Slovenia at Windsor Park. In June 2016, Washington was named in the Northern Ireland squad for the UEFA Euro 2016 tournament. He scored his first competitive goal in Northern Ireland's 2–0 home World Cup Qualifying victory over Norway on 26 March 2017, making it three goals in three starts for him at Windsor Park.

== Career statistics ==
=== Club ===
As of match played 13 April 2024

Appearances and goals by club, season and competition
Club	Season	League			National Cup		League Cup		Other		Total	
Club	Season	Division	Apps	Goals	Apps	Goals	Apps	Goals	Apps	Goals	Apps	Goals
St Ives Town	2008–09	UCL Premier Division	1	0	0	0	—		0	0	1	0
St Ives Town	2009–10	UCL Premier Division	23	8	0	0	—		1 (Note: Appearance in United Counties League Cup)	0	24	8
St Ives Town	2010–11	UCL Premier Division	21	11	0	0	—		3 (Note: Two appearances and two goals in United Counties League Cup, one appearance and one goal in FA Vase)	3	24	14
St Ives Town	2011–12	UCL Premier Division	35	35	1	2	—		9 (Note: Five appearances and eight goals in United Counties League Cup, two appearances and five goals in FA Vase, two appearances and two goals in Huntingdonshire Senior Cup)	15	45	52
St Ives Town	2012–13	UCL Premier Division	8	11	0	0	—		0	0	8	11
St Ives Town	Total		88	65	1	2	—		13	18	102	85
Newport County	2012–13	Conference Premier	15	1	0	0	—		1 (Note: Appearance in Conference Premier play-offs)	0	16	1
Newport County	2013–14	League Two	24	4	3	0	2	1	3 (Note: Appearances in Football League Trophy)	2	32	7
Newport County	Total		39	5	3	0	2	1	4	2	48	8
Peterborough United	2013–14	League One	17	4	0	0	0	0	2 (Note: Two appearances in League One play-offs)	1	19	5
Peterborough United	2014–15	League One	40	13	2	0	1	0	1	0	44	13
Peterborough United	2015–16	League One	25	10	3	4	2	1	1	0	31	15
Peterborough United	Total		82	27	5	4	3	1	4	1	94	33
Queens Park Rangers	2015–16	Championship	15	0	0	0	0	0	—		15	0
Queens Park Rangers	2016–17	Championship	40	7	0	0	3	1	—		43	8
Queens Park Rangers	2017–18	Championship	33	6	0	0	1	0	—		34	6
Queens Park Rangers	2018–19	Championship	4	0	—		2	0	—		6	0
Queens Park Rangers	Total		92	13	0	0	6	1	0	0	98	14
Sheffield United	2018–19	Championship	15	0	1	0	—		—		16	0
Heart of Midlothian	2019–20	Scottish Premiership	15	3	3	0	4	1	—		22	4
Charlton Athletic	2020–21	League One	36	11	1	0	1	0	0	0	38	11
Charlton Athletic	2021–22	League One	35	11	2	0	0	0	1 (Note: One appearance in the EFL Trophy)	0	38	11
Charlton Athletic	Total		71	22	3	0	1	0	1	0	76	22
Rotherham United	2022–23	Championship	35	5	1	1	1	0	—		37	6
Derby County	2023–24	League One	19	3	1	0	1	0	1	0	22	3
Derby County	2024–25	Championship	0	0	0	0	0	0	—		0	0
Derby County	Total		19	3	1	0	1	0	1	0	22	3
Career total			456	143	18	7	18	4	23	21	515	175

=== International ===
As of match played 20 November 2023

Appearances and goals by national team and year
National team	Year	Apps	Goals
Northern Ireland	2016	9	2
Northern Ireland	2017	7	1
Northern Ireland	2018	2	0
Northern Ireland	2019	3	1
Northern Ireland	2020	8	0
Northern Ireland	2021	6	2
Northern Ireland	2023	8	0
Total		43	6

As of match played 12 October 2021. Northern Ireland score listed first, score column indicates score after each Washington goal.

List of international goals scored by Conor Washington
No.	Date	Venue	Cap	Opponent	Score	Result	Competition
1	28 March 2016	Windsor Park, Belfast, Northern Ireland	2	Slovenia	1–0	1–0	Friendly
2	27 May 2016	Windsor Park, Belfast, Northern Ireland	3	Belarus	2–0	3–0	Friendly
3	26 March 2017	Windsor Park, Belfast, Northern Ireland	10	Norway	2–0	2–0	2018 FIFA World Cup qualification
4	8 June 2019	A. Le Coq Arena, Tallinn, Estonia	22	Estonia	1–1	2–1	UEFA Euro 2020 qualification
5	2 September 2021	LFF Stadium, Vilnius, Lithuania	30	Lithuania	2–0	4–1	2022 FIFA World Cup qualification
6	12 October 2021	Vasil Levski National Stadium, Sofia, Bulgaria	33	Bulgaria	1–0	1–2	2022 FIFA World Cup qualification

== Honours ==
Sheffield United

- EFL Championship second-place promotion: 2018–19

Derby County

- League One second-place promotion: 2023–24
