= Ashley Fuller =

English footballer

Personal information
- Date of birth: 14 November 1986 (age 39)
- Place of birth: Bedford, England
- Position: Winger

Team information
- Current team: Kempston Rovers

Senior career*
Years	Team	Apps	(Gls)
2004–2006	Cambridge United	24	(0)
2006	Gravesend & Northfleet	13	(5)
2006–2007	Bishop's Stortford	38	(19)
2007–2008	Cambridge City	27	(21)
- * Club domestic league appearances and goals as of 16 December 2007

Ashley Fuller (born 14 November 1986 in Bedford) is an English footballer playing for Kempston Rovers in the Evo-Stik Southern League Division One South & West. He has previously played for Cambridge United in Football League Two and Gravesend & Northfleet, Cambridge City and Kettering Town.

Between his stints at Cambridge United and Gravesend & Northfleet, Ashley briefly worked as a debt collector in Essex
