= Paul Lamb =

Paul Lamb may refer to:

- Paul Lamb (footballer) (born 1974), English footballer
- Paul Lamb (musician) (born 1955), British blues harmonica player and bandleader
- Paul Lamb (politician) (1901-1986), Kansas state senator
- Paul Lamb, "the invisible man", an unseen character in Fresh Meat (TV series)
