= Oran Jackson =

English footballer (born 1998)

Personal information
- Full name: Oran Egypt Jackson
- Date of birth: 16 October 1998 (age 28)
- Place of birth: Milton Keynes, England
- Height: 1.80 m (5 ft 11 in)
- Position: Defender

Team information
- Current team: Stamford

Youth career
- –2016: Milton Keynes Dons

Senior career*
Years	Team	Apps	(Gls)
2016–2019	Milton Keynes Dons	1	(0)
2017	→ Hemel Hempstead Town (loan)	4	(0)
2019	→ Brackley Town (loan)	2	(0)
2019	ÍBV	9	(0)
2019–2020	Billericay Town	5	(0)
2020–2021	St Ives Town	3	(0)
2021–2022	Portadown	5	(0)
2024–2026	Rugby Borough		
2026–	Stamford		
- * Club domestic league appearances and goals as of 12:17, 14 January 2022 (UTC)

Oran Egypt Jackson (born 16 October 1998) is an English semi-professional footballer who plays for Stamford, as a defender.

== Club career ==
=== Milton Keynes Dons ===
Jackson joined Milton Keynes Dons' academy at a young age, progressing through various age groups and into the club's development squad. On 7 May 2016, Jackson made his debut for the first team, featuring as a substitute in the 88th minute in a 1–2 home defeat to Nottingham Forest. On 26 July 2016, following an impressive spell in pre-season, Jackson signed professional terms with the club signing a one-year deal with an option of a further 12 months.

On 17 February 2017, Jackson joined National League South side Hemel Hempstead Town on a youth loan deal until the end of the 2016–17 season, eventually making 4 appearances for the club. On 14 June 2017, Jackson's contract was extended until summer 2018 and later again until the summer of 2019. However, following limited first team opportunities, Jackson was one of ten players released by the club at the end of the 2018–19 season.

=== ÍBV ===
On 18 July 2019, Jackson signed for Icelandic Úrvalsdeild club ÍBV.

=== St Ives Town ===
Jackson signed for Southern League Premier Central side St Ives Town on 6 September 2020.

=== Stamford ===
Oran signed for Southern League Premier Division Central side Stamford on 13 March 2026.

== Career statistics ==
As of 30 September 2020.

Club	Season	League			FA Cup		League Cup		Other		Total	
Club	Season	Division	Apps	Goals	Apps	Goals	Apps	Goals	Apps	Goals	Apps	Goals
Milton Keynes Dons	2015–16	Championship	1	0	0	0	0	0	—		1	0
Milton Keynes Dons	2016–17	League One	0	0	0	0	2	0	2 (Note: Appearance(s) in EFL Trophy.)	0	4	0
Milton Keynes Dons	2017–18	League One	0	0	0	0	0	0	0	0	0	0
Milton Keynes Dons	2018–19	League Two	0	0	0	0	2	0	2	0	4	0
Milton Keynes Dons	Total		1	0	0	0	4	0	4	0	9	0
Hemel Hempstead Town (loan)	2016–17	National League South	4	0	—		—		—		4	0
Brackley Town (loan)	2018–19	National League North	2	0	—		—		1 (Note: Appearance(s) in FA Trophy.)	0	3	0
ÍBV	2019	Úrvalsdeild	9	0	0	0	0	0	0	0	9	0
Billericay Town	2019–20	National League South	5	0	—		—		3 (Note: Appearance(s) in Essex Senior Cup.)	0	8	0
St Ives Town	2020–21	Southern League Premier Central	3	0	—		—		0	0	3	0
Career total			24	0	0	0	4	0	8	0	36	0
