= Paul Lamb (footballer) =

English footballer

Personal information
- Date of birth: 12 September 1974 (age 52)
- Place of birth: Plumstead, London, England
- Position: Midfielder

Team information
- Current team: AFC Rushden & Diamonds (assistant manager)

Youth career
- ????–1992: Northampton Town

Senior career*
Years	Team	Apps	(Gls)
1992	Northampton Town	3	(0)
- Dunstable
- Buckingham Town
- Bedworth United
- Buckingham Town
????–2001	Wealdstone		
2001–2002	Boreham Wood		
2002–2003	Hemel Hempstead Town		
2003–2004	Brackley Town		
2004–2005	Aylesbury United		
2005	Banbury United		
2006–2009	Bedworth United		
2009–2011	Daventry Town		
- * Club domestic league appearances and goals

Paul Lamb (born 12 September 1974) was an English footballer. His last club was Daventry Town, who he agreed to become player/coach of in the 2009 off season and stayed there until 2011, when he became Assistant Manager at Banbury United F.C.

Lamb was born in Plumstead, London and began his career as a trainee with Northampton Town, making three league appearances in the 1991–92 season whilst still a trainee. Paul is now a physical education teacher at Malcolm Arnold Academy in Northampton.

After being released by Northampton he joined non-league Dunstable, subsequently playing for Buckingham Town (twice), Bedworth United and Wealdstone before joining Boreham Wood in December 2001. He moved to Hemel Hempstead Town in July 2002 and to Brackley Town in the 2003 close season before joining Aylesbury United in June 2004.

In July 2005 Lamb joined Banbury United, before re-joining Bedworth United and moving a few places down the Football pyramid to Daventry Town, citing his advancing years as one of the reasons he made the move. In 2011, he joined Banbury United as Assistant Manager, working with Ady Fuller. He is currently Assistant Manager to Andy Peaks at AFC Rushden & Diamonds.
