= United Counties League =

Ninth and Tenth tier of English league football

- Founded: 1895; 131 years ago
- Country: England
- Divisions: Premier Division North; Premier Division South; Division One
- Number of clubs: 64
- Level on pyramid: Levels 9–10
- Feeder to: Southern League Division One Central; Northern Premier League Division One East and Midlands
- Domestic cup(s): United Counties League Cup; FA Vase; FA Cup
- Current champions: Boston Town (Premier Division North); Nuneaton Town (Premier Division South); Retford (Division One) (2025–26)
- Website: theucl.co.uk
- Current: 2026–27 United Counties League

The United Counties League (also known for sponsorship reasons as the GCE Hire Fleet Ltd. United Counties League) is an English football league covering an area including the English counties of northern Bedfordshire, northern Buckinghamshire, most of Cambridgeshire, south Yorkshire, Derbyshire, Huntingdonshire, Leicestershire, most of Lincolnshire, western Norfolk, Northamptonshire, Nottinghamshire, northern Oxfordshire, Rutland, eastern Staffordshire, eastern Warwickshire and eastern West Midlands. It has a total of five divisions, three for first teams and two for reserve teams, but the reserves' divisions were merged into a single division for the 2013–14 season and remains so at present.

Clubs in the Premier Divisions are eligible to enter the FA Cup in the preliminary round stages. The clubs in the league are eligible for the FA Vase, and there are knockout cups for the Premier/Division One clubs and for the Reserve Divisions clubs.

== History ==
The United Counties League was formed in 1895 as the Northamptonshire Junior League, dropping the 'Junior' one year later. It took its current name in 1934 as teams from other counties had long since been a part of the league. Over the years the UCL has 'united' teams from Northamptonshire, Rutland and Bedfordshire with those from parts of Buckinghamshire, Cambridgeshire, Huntingdonshire, Leicestershire, Lincolnshire and even Norfolk. Northampton Town joined the league in 1897 and became champions in their second season before moving up to the Southern League. They would become the league's first former member to reach the Football League in 1920. In 1900 Bedford Queens became the first club from outside the county to join the league.

The Football Association announced on 12 April 2021 that United Counties League would administer a new Step 5 division since the 2021–22 season after the scheduled National League System restructure had a one-season postponement due to the COVID-19 pandemic in England.

== Current members, 2026–27 season ==
Locations of the United Counties League clubs by division
– Premier Division North – Premier Division South – Division One

=== Step 5 ===
The league has two divisions at Step 5 of the National League System (level 9 of the English football league system). Member clubs take part in cup competitions organised by the county FA to which they are affiliated and other cup competitions. The north division currently has 18 clubs, feeding into the Northern Premier League Division One Midlands and East. The south division currently has 19 clubs, feeding into the Northern Premier League Division One Midlands and Southern Football League Division One Central.

Premier Division North
Club	Home ground	Ground capacity
AFC Mansfield	Forest Town Stadium, Forest Town	
Ashby Ivanhoe	NFU Sports Ground, Ashby de la Zouch	
Aylestone Park	Gary Lineker Pavillion, Leicester	1,128
Belper United	Coronation Park, Eastwood	2,500
Blackstones	Seven Bespoke Joinery Stadium, Stamford	1,250
Clay Cross Town	The Adalynne Haye Stadium, Old Tupton	500
Deeping Rangers	The Haydon Whitham Stadium, Market Deeping	2,000
Eastwood	Coronation Park, Eastwood	2,500
Gresley Rovers	Moat Ground, Church Gresley	2,400
Heanor Town	Town Ground, Heanor	2,700
Hinckley	Kirby Road Sports Ground, Barwell	2,500
Hucknall Town	Aeriel Way, Hucknall	4,000
Kimberley Miners Welfare	The Stag Ground, Kimberley	1,000
Leicester Nirvana	Hamilton Park, Hamilton	1,000
Newark Town	YMCA Sports Village, Newark-on-Trent	1,000
Sheffield	Home of Football Ground, Dronfield	2,000
Sherwood Colliery	Debdale Park Sports & Recreational Club, Mansfield Woodhouse	
Skegness Town	MKM Stadium, Skegness	1,000

Premier Division South
Club	Home ground	Ground capacity
Atherstone Town	Sheepy Road, Atherstone	
Coton Green	The Dave Henderson Memorial Ground, Fazeley	
Coventry Sphinx	Sphinx Drive, Coventry	
Daventry Town	Master Abrasives Stadium, Daventry	1,855
Desborough Town	Waterworks Field, Desborough	
Eynesbury Rovers	Alfred Hall Memorial Ground, Eynesbury	1,000
FC Peterborough	The Focus Centre, Peterborough	
FC Stratford	Arden Garages Stadium, Knights Lane, Tiddington	
Godmanchester Rovers	The Peter Hodson Community Ground, Godmanchester	1,050
Highgate United	The Coppice, Shirley	
Histon	Bridge Road, Impington	4,300
Knowle	Robins' Nest, Knowle	
Lutterworth Town	Dunley Way, Lutterworth	1,000
Moulton	Brunting Road, Moulton	
Northampton Old Nothamptonian Chenecks	Old Northamptonians Sports Ground, Northampton	
Northampton Sileby Rangers	O'Riordan Bond Stadium, Northampton	
Rugby Town	Butlin Road, Rugby, Warwickshire	5,000
St Neots Town	Rowley Park, St Neots	3,500
Yaxley	APG Park, Yaxley	1,000

=== Step 6 (Division One) ===
Division One is at level 10 (step 6) in the football pyramid above five smaller local leagues below the recognised NLS: Central Midlands League, Leicestershire Senior League, Lincolnshire League, Northamptonshire Combination League and Nottinghamshire Senior League. There are currently 22 clubs in this division.

Club	Home ground	Ground capacity
Clifton All Whites	Norman Archer Memorial Ground, Clifton	1,000
Clipstone	Lido Ground, Clipstone	
Cotgrave	Cotgrave Welfare	
Dronfield Town	Stonelow Stadium, Dronfield	500
Dunkirk	Empire Sports Ground, Nottingham	1,500
Gedling Miners Welfare	Mapperley Plains Sports Club, Mapperley	2,000
Harrowby United	Dickens Road, Grantham	1,500
Louth Town	MKM Louth Stadium, Saltfleetby	
Maltby Main	Muglet Lane, Maltby	2,000
Pinchbeck United	MKM Stadium, Sleaford	1,000
Pinxton	Pinxton Miners Welfare, Pinxton	2,000
Radford	Oakfield Arena, Nottingham	1,000
Sandiacre Town	St Giles Park, Sandiacre	
Selston	The Parish Hall Ground	
Shirebrook Town	WH Davis Stadium, Shirebrook	2,000
Sleaford Town	Eslaforde Park, Sleaford	1,000
South Normanton Athletic	Transcare Arena, South Normanton	3,000
Southwell City	Centenary Ground, Brinkley	
Stapleford Town	Hickings Lane Recreation Ground, Stapleford	
Staveley Miners Welfare	Inkersall Road, Staveley	5,000
Swallownest	Miners Welfare Ground, Swallownest	
West Bridgford	Regatta Way Sports Ground, Gamston	1,000

=== Reserve Division ===
The membership of the Reserve Division is made up largely of the reserves and development teams of clubs in the Premier Division and Division One of the United Counties League. It has run as a single division since season 2013–14, and currently contains sixteen teams.

== Recent champions ==
Season	Premier Division	Division One	Reserves Division 1	Reserves Division 2	League Cup	Reserve Divisions Cup
1980–81	Stamford	Stevenage Borough	Wootton Blue Cross	Not Formed	Irthlingborough Diamonds	Long Buckby
1981–82	Stamford	Newport Pagnell Town	Irthlingborough Diamonds	Not Formed	Stamford	Irthligborough Diamonds
1982–83	Irthlingborough Diamonds	Raunds Town	Irthlingborough Diamonds	Not Formed	Wootton Blue Cross	Desborough Town
1983–84	Buckingham Town	Brackley Town	Arlesey Town	Raunds Town	Buckingham Town	Stamford
1984–85	Arlesey Town	Northampton Spencer	Long Buckby	Brackley Town	Long Buckby	Raunds Town
1985–86	Buckingham Town	Kempston Rovers	Irthlingborough Diamonds	Wootton Blue Cross	Stamford	Rushden Town
1986–87	Potton United	Baker Perkins	Irthlingborough Diamonds	Wellingborough Whitworths	Stewarts & Lloyds Corby	Irthlingborough Diamonds
1987–88	Spalding United	British Timken Duston	Stotfold	Kettering Town	Arlesey Town	Kettering Town
1988–89	Potton United	Ramsey Town	Raunds Town	Cogenhoe United	Northampton Spencer	Raunds Town
1989–90	Holbeach United	Daventry Town	Mirrlees Blackstone	Northampton ON Chenecks	Holbeach United	Mirrlees Blackstone
1990–91	Bourne Town	Daventry Town	Northampton Spencer	Wellingborough Town	Raunds Town	Northampton Spencer
1991–92	Northampton Spencer	Harrowby United	Stotfold	Hamlet S & L Corby	Rothwell Town	Stotfold
1992–93	Rothwell Town	Ford Sports Daventry	Rushden & Diamonds	Burton Park Wanderers	Rothwell Town	Rushden & Diamonds
1993–94	Rothwell Town	Northampton Vanaid	Rothwell Town	Bourne Town	Northampton Spencer	Rothwell Town
1994–95	Boston Town	St Neots Town	Northampton Spencer	Wootton Blue Cross	Spalding United	Cogenhoe United
1995–96	Raunds Town	Ford Sports Daventry	Raunds Town	Wellingborough Whitworths	Cogenhoe United	Mirrlees Blackstone
1996–97	Stamford	Yaxley	Stotfold	Northampton Vanaid	Desborough Town	Rothwell Town
1997–98	Stamford	Higham Town	Rothwell Town	St Neots Town	Ford Sports Daventry	Rothwell Town
1998–99	Spalding United	Bugbrooke St Michaels	Rothwell Town	Kettering Town	Stotfold	Northampton Spencer
1999–2000	Ford Sports Daventry	Cottingham	Rothwell Town	King's Lynn	Cogenhoe United	King's Lynn
2000–01	Boston Town	Daventry Town	Cogenhoe United	Stamford	Desborough Town	Rothwell Town
2001–02	Ford Sports Daventry	Newport Pagnell Town	Stotfold	Holbeach United	Raunds Town	Wootton Blue Cross
2002–03	Holbeach United	Northampton Sileby Rangers	Bugbrooke St Michaels	Olney Town	Blackstones	Stewarts & Lloyds Corby
2003–04	Spalding United	Potton United	Raunds Town	Bourne Town	Boston Town	Blackstones
2004–05	Cogenhoe United	Northampton Sileby Rangers	Yaxley	Ford Sports Daventry	Potton United	Stotfold
2005–06	Woodford United	Sleaford Town	Bourne Town	Woodford United	Yaxley	Northampton Sileby Rangers
2006–07	Deeping Rangers	Whitworths	Cogenhoe United	St Neots Town	Boston Town	Cogenhoe United
2007–08	Stotfold	Daventry Town	Stotfold	Huntingdon Town	Desborough Town	Blackstones
2008–09	Stewarts & Lloyds Corby	Peterborough Northern Star	Stotfold	Peterborough Northern Star	Stotfold	Blackstones
2009–10	Daventry Town	Irchester United	St. Neots Town	Northampton ON Chenecks	St Ives Town	Stotfold
2010–11	St. Neots Town	AFC Kempston Rovers	Cogenhoe United	King's Lynn Town	Peterborough Northern Star	Thrapston Town
2011–12	Long Buckby	Huntingdon Town	King's Lynn Town	Bugbrooke St Michaels	St Ives Town	Whitworth
2012–13	Holbeach United	Northampton Sileby Rangers	Cogenhoe United	Oadby Town	Spalding United	AFC Kempston Rovers

Season	Premier Division	Division One	Reserves Division	League Cup	Reserve Divisions Cup
2013–14	Spalding United	Oadby Town	Cogenhoe United	Huntingdon Town	Peterborough Northern Star
2014–15	AFC Rushden & Diamonds	Northampton Spencer	Bugbrooke St Michaels	AFC Rushden & Diamonds	Bugbrooke St Michaels
2015–16	AFC Kempston Rovers	Peterborough Sports	Rushden & Higham United Reserves	Peterborough Sports	Rothwell Corinthians Reserves
2016–17	Peterborough Sports	Daventry Town	Lutterworth Athletic Reserves	Yaxley	Raunds Town Reserves
2017–18	Yaxley	Pinchbeck United	Bugbrooke St Michaels Reserves	Leicester Nirvana	Yaxley Reserves
2018–19	Daventry Town	Lutterworth Town	Desborough Town Reserves	Daventry Town	Cogenhoe Reserves
2019–20	Season abandoned due to the COVID-19 pandemic in England			Not played	
2020–21	Season abandoned due to the COVID-19 pandemic in England			Not played	

Season	Premier Division North	Premier Division South	Division One	Reserves Division	League Cup	Reserve Divisions Cup
2021–22	Long Eaton United	Harborough Town	Kimberley Miners Welfare	Bugbrooke St Michaels Reserves	Not played	
2022–23	Anstey Nomads	Coventry Sphinx	Aylestone Park	Harborough Town Reserves	Anstey Nomads	Newport Pagnell Town Reserves
2023–24	Sherwood Colliery	Wellingborough Town	Bourne Town	Kempston Rovers Reserves	Skegness Town	Buckingham Development
2024–25	Lincoln United	St Neots Town	Clay Cross Town	Desborough Town Reserves	Eynesbury Rovers	Bugbrooke St Michaels Reserves
2025–26	Boston Town	Nuneaton Town	Retford			

== Committee ==
League Committee
Name	Position
Alan Poulain	Chairman
Trevor Mitchell	Vice Chairman Appointments Director
Wendy Newey	Company Secretary / Treasurer
Roger Walker	Fixture Director
Ian Hughes	Facility Director
Jim Sharp	Referee Appointment Officer/Discipline Director
Jamie Shaw	Development Director
Katie Day	Marketing Director & Registrations Officer
Russell Matthews	Committee member
Eddie Slinn	Committee member & Club Rep
Steve Harris	Committee member
David Lumley	Committee member
Stuart Coles	Committee member
David Holmes	Committee member& Club Rep
Cliff Mills	Committee Member
Stacy Crofts	Office Admin
Matt Berry	Office Admin
Ian Colliins	Committee Member & Club Rep

== Defunct clubs ==
These include:

- British Timken Athletic F.C.
