= Peterborough Northern Star F.C. =

Association football club in England

Coordinates: 52°35′41.91″N 0°13′37.43″W

Peterborough Northern Star
- Full name: Peterborough Northern Star Football Club
- Nickname: The Star
- Founded: 1905
- Ground: Branch Bros Stadium, Chestnut Avenue, Peterborough
- Capacity: 600
- Manager: Lloyd Burton
- League
- 2021–22: United Counties League Premier Division South (withdrew)
- Website: www.pnsfc.co.uk
Home colours	Away colours

Peterborough Northern Star F.C. was a football club based in Peterborough, Cambridgeshire, England. They last played in the in 2021.

== History ==
Originally, Northern Star, was called Northam Star. Supposedly, Peterborough Northern Star had its roots in Eye village football, where the team played in the Peterborough and District Football League under three different names in four spells from 1905 to 1930, with a couple of breaks, Including one for the First World War.

In 1931, Northam Star Sports Club was created, taking over from Eye United and combining works teams from the Northam and Dogsthorpe Star brick works. In their first season in Division Three North of the new Peterborough and District Football League, their first match was a 5–2 defeat away to Paston Athletic Reserves. This first season saw Northam Star finish sixth in a league of ten teams.

Between then and 1959, Northam Star won Division Three North twice, before the team disbanded and changed their name to Eye United in 1959. They won ten league titles in the PDFL between 1960 and 2003, including three Premier Division titles in a row, in the early 1980s. In the 2000/01 season, Eye United won all thirty league games, winning the title by sixteen points.

From 1973 to 2003, Eye United won five Senior Cups, including a hat-trick from 2000/01 to 2002/03, and they also won the Jack Hogg Shield four times in a row from 2000 to 2003. They joined the United Counties League Division One in 2003/04, moving from Lindisfarne Road to their current base in Dogsthorpe.

After two seasons in UCL Division One, in which the team finished third and fourth, they changed their name, due to the fact that they were no longer based in Eye, and the club debuted as Peterborough Northern Star in 2005/06, finishing ninth. Northern Star won the UCL Div One in 2008/09, and after placing second in the 2010/2011 season, they were promoted to the Premier Division and the club won its first Hinchingbrooke Cup that year.

In the UCL Premier Division, the club finished its debut season in ninth place and a couple of years later reached the quarter finals of the FA Vase, before losing to the eventual victors, Dunston, 4–3 in front of over 600 spectators, and following the departure of manager Chris Plummer that team broke up, and the seasons since 2012 have seen frequent changes of manager and playing staff.

Despite this, success continued to be achieved at all levels from juniors to youths and reserves in 2014/15, the Star first team secured its second Hinchingbrooke Cup with a victory over Deeping Rangers and reached the final again the following year, where we were defeated by Peterborough Sports.

For the 2016/17 season, in which they finished 15th, Raff Mazzarella returned to the club as first team manager, following a previous spell in charge of the club's reserve side, which saw his team finish runners up in the league and win the Reserve KO Cup. In the 2017/18 season, Raff stepped down as first team manager and became the club's director of football.

The new first team manager was Rob Ward who joined the club after two seasons at Ketton in the PDFL, where he was joint manager of last season's Daniels Cup winning side, before being relieved of his position on 19 November.

== Honours ==
- United Counties Football League Division One
  - Champions 2019–20
  - Runners-up 2007–08, 2009–10
- United Counties Football League KO Cup
  - Winners 2010–11
- Les Underwood Junior Cup
  - Winners 2010–11
- Hinchingbrooke Cup
  - Winners 2009–10, 2014–15

== Club staff ==
- First Team
  - Manager: Lloyd Burton

== Records ==
- FA Cup
  - 1st Qualifying Round 2012-13 (vs St Neots Town (a) 5–0)
- FA Vase
  - Quarter-finals 2011–12 (vs Dunston UTS (h) 3–4)
- United Counties League Premier Division
  - 2010-11 (6th place)
- Biggest Home Win
  - 9-0 vs Daventry United, 26 April 2008: United Counties League Division One
  - 9-0 vs Sleaford Town, 23 September 2014: United Counties League Division One
- Biggest Away Win
  - 0-8 vs Burton Park Wanderers, 11 February 2016: United Counties League Division One
- Biggest Home Defeat
  - 0-9 vs Peterborough Sports, 17 September 2019: Northants Hillier Cup First Round
- Biggest Away Defeat
  - 7-0 vs Kings Lynn Town, 27 March 2012: United Counties League KO Cup
- Record Attendance
  - 597 vs Dunston UTS, 3 March 2012: FA Vase Quarter-finals
