= Daventry Town F.C. =

Association football club in England

Daventry Town
- Full name: Daventry Town Football Club
- Nickname: PurpleArmy / The Town
- Founded: 1886; 140 years ago
- Ground: Master Abrasives Stadium; Browns Road; Daventry; NN11 4NS
- Capacity: 1,855 (255 Seats)
- Chairman: Steve Tubb
- Manager: Jamie Forrest
- League: United Counties League Premier Division South
- 2025–26: United Counties League Premier Division South, 14th of 20
- Website: https://dtfc.co.uk/
Home colours	Away colours

Daventry Town F.C. is a football club based in the town of Daventry, Northamptonshire, England, formed in 1886. They are members of the United Counties League Premier Division South.

== History ==
The club was established in 1886 as a local-town club playing in the Northampton Town League. The club moved to the Northants Combination in 1987, and their emergence began under manager Willie Barrett, who led the club to successive championships in the Combination First and Premier divisions. In 1989–90, the club joined the United Counties League Division One. Since joining the United Counties League, they have won promotion to the Premier Division on three occasions, but have also been relegated twice.

The club started at The Hollow Ground in the town, but having won promotion at the first attempt were denied because their new Elderstubbs ground was not ready in time. Their manager left, and the fortunes of the club declined with relegation alternating with promotion.

The club was threatened with extinction in 2005–06, when the Elderstubbs clubhouse and changing rooms were destroyed by fire. However, a sponsorship deal with mobile phone company Go Mobile enabled the club to survive.

2007–08 was a very successful season for Daventry Town. They won UCL Division One, losing just once, and defeated three Premier division teams en route to the League Knockout Cup final, where they were defeated by Desborough Town 3–2.

In the 2009–10 season Daventry won promotion to the Southern League Division One Central, by becoming champions of the United Counties League under the guidance of manager Ady Fuller.

2010–2011, Fuller's Town finished 3rd in their first season in the Southern League Division One Central losing to Hitchin Town 2–0 in the play off final in front of a crowd of 1048.

Prior to the start of the 2011–2012 Mark Kinsella was brought in and Ady Fuller moved on to become manager of Banbury United. A majority of Fuller's team moved elsewhere. Over 40 players wore the purple shirt during the season and not surprisingly the team struggled to find any consistency until the end of the season.

During the 2011–2012, local rivals Daventry United folded and their manager Darran Foster moved to Daventry Town as Kinsella's assistant. However, Kinsella was relieved of his duties shortly afterwards and Foster took charge of team affairs. In Foster's first season, 2012–2013, Town finished a highly respectable 8th in the table.

With a majority of the players remaining at the club for the 2013–14 season, the team made an incredible start to the campaign, winning their first 7 matches in the league whilst also qualifying for the FA Cup first round proper for the first time in their history. They were drawn away to Chesterfield from Football League Two, and ended up losing the tie 2–0.

After the playing budget was cut, Foster resigned in early November 2014. Daventry then appointed ex-Watford striker Allan Smart as his replacement.

However, in June 2015, Iain Humphrey resigned as chairman and was replaced by Allan Smart, who relinquished his role as Daventry Town's manager in the process.

Ady Fuller, who had served as Smart's assistant and had a previous spell as Daventry Town boss as well as stints as manager at Banbury United and Bedworth United, was appointed as caretaker manager in the interim period in June 2015.

However, Humphrey would make a U-turn and return as chairman just a month later, in July 2015, replacing Smart and caretaker manager Fuller who both left the club altogether. His first move was to re-appoint former manager Darran Foster who had left the club in November 2014. Foster had only just been appointed manager at Woodford United in June 2015.

Foster resigned in April 2016 following a 5–0 home defeat to Kidsgrove Athletic.

Club goalkeeping coach Derren Midson and the club's juniors development Officer Pete Flockhart stepped in as caretaker managers with Brian Porter returning as club secretary to ensure the club somehow completed their remaining 6 fixtures of the 2015/2016 season.

In May 2016, Daventry Town resigned from the Northern Premier League due to financial problems and were later placed in the United Counties League Division One, step 9 of English football, for the 2016–17 season. Ian Humphrey resigned and handed over full control to a new executive committee. Local businessman Steve Tubb took over as chairman.

In May 2016, Woodford United player-manager Arron Parkinson and ex-Cogenhoe United manager Andy Marks were confirmed as joint managers for season 2016–17.

In April 2017, Daventry Town won the UCL Division One in their first season back at this level, going undefeated at home. They were promoted to the United Counties Premier Division.

Following Andy Marks's decision to step down as joint manager, Ian King was appointed joint manager alongside Arron Parkinson.

In May 2018, Daventry Town won the Buckingham Charity Cup beating Buckingham Athletic 2 0 in the final.

In June 2018, Ian King resigned so he could find a position in the professional game. Arron Parkinson took on the role as manager and appointed former Woodford United and AFC Rushden & Diamonds keeper Matt Finlay as his assistant. Pete Harris joined as coach and Andy Emery was announced as reserve team manager.

2018–19 saw Arron Parkinson lead the club to the double by winning the UCL Premier Division and the UCL Knock Out Cup.

In 2019–20, the club returned to the Southern League, however, the COVID-19 pandemic meant that they would not complete this or the 2020–21 season.

Sadly during this time, the Town lost three members of the Hobbs family in quick session. Club president Frank Hobbs died just two weeks after his wife Sarah. Frank's younger brother, Malcolm Hobbs, died just three months later. Between them, they had covered just about every position within the club and had given almost 200 years of combined service to the Town.

In 2021–22, the club moved to the Northern Premier League Division One Midlands ending the season in 16th place in the table. Off the pitch, Chairman Steve Tubb was joined by Derren Midson with the two becoming co-chairmen. This reverted to Steve Tubb as sole chairman at the end of the season as Midson reverted to his role as junior chairman.

The club also started a third male adult team playing in the Northants Combination League Division 3. This team was called Daventry Town Hobbs.

In 2021–22, the club moved to the Northern Premier League Midlands Division ending the season in 16th place but 15 points clear of the relegation spots.

Off the pitch, the club announced that it was debt free.

Prior to the 2022/23 season, the club also started up an u18s side playing in the Northants Senior Youth League. The club also confirmed that a record 39 junior teams would be playing in various local leagues.

Daren Young was appointed first team manager at the start of the 2023/24 season. Following an inconsistent start to the season, the club only won two matches in 2024, Young left the club by mutual agreement.

Jamie Forrest told over as first team manager in June 2024. The Reserves returned to Daventry after a year out, Jamie Jollands moved up from the u18s as reserve team manager. Josh Pyott took over the u18s NSYL Team.

As of 05 October 2024

Note: Flags indicate national team as defined under FIFA eligibility rules; some limited exceptions apply. Players may hold more than one non-FIFA nationality.

No.	Pos.	Nation	Player
—	GK	ENG	Will Bewley
—	GK	MDA	Iustin Cerga
—	GK	MDA	Iustin Cerga
—	GK	ENG	Lewi Patching
—	DF	ENG	Jack Ashton
—	DF	ENG	Luke Knight
—	DF	ENG	Stephan Morley
—	DF	ENG	Kelvin Moyo
—	DF	ROU	Robert-Alexandru Palamariu
—	DF	ENG	Merson Styles
—	DF	ENG	Callum Westwood
—	DF	ENG	Tom Woods
—	MF	GHA	Dodzi Agbenu
—	MF	ENG	Dan Childs
—	MF	ENG	Adam Confue
—	MF	ENG	Jamie Fuller

No.	Pos.	Nation	Player
—	MF	ENG	Andre Olukanmi
—	MF	ENG	Harley Mallard
—	MF	ENG	Archie May
—	MF	ENG	George Mitchell-Gears
—	MF	ENG	Carter Price
—	MF	ENG	Gary Stohrer
—	FW	GHA	Enoch Andoh
—	FW	ROU	Cyrus Bruce
—	FW	ROU	Cosmin Capatina
—	FW	ENG	Luke Emery
—	FW	ENG	David Gbehe
—	FW	ENG	Halim Halim
—	FW	ENG	Rhys Hoenes
—	FW	ENG	Dylan McGinley
—	FW	ENG	Dylan Wilson
—	FW	POL	Dominik Wysocki

== Club honours ==
- Northampton Town League Division One
  - Winners: 1975–76
- Northants Combination League Division One
  - Winners: 1987–88
- Northants Combination League Premier Division
  - Winners: 1988–89
- Northants Combination League Knock Out Cup
  - Winners: 1987–88
- United Counties League Division One
  - Winners: 1989–90, 1990–91, 2000–01, 2007–08, 2016–17
- United Counties League Premier Division
  - Winners: 2009–10, 2018–19
- United Counties Knock Out Cup
  - Runners Up: 2007–08
  - Winners: 2018–19
- Northamptonshire FA / Junior Cup
  - Winners: 1930–31
  - Winners: 1960–61
- Northamptonshire FA / Lower Junior Cup
  - Winners: 1990–91
  - Runners Up: 1988–99
- Northamptonshire FA / Hillier Cup
  - Winners: 2013–14
  - Runners Up: 2009–10, 2012–13
  - Finalist: 2019–20 Final v Kettering Town not played due to COVID-19
- Daventry Charity Cup
  - Winners: 1997–98, 1999–2000
- Buckingham Charity Cup
  - Winners: 2017–18
- Taygold Cup
  - Winners: 1988–89

== Club records ==
- Highest League Position: 3rd in Southern League Division One Central 2010–11
- F.A Cup best Performance: First round proper 2013–14
- F.A. Trophy best performance: First round proper 2013–14
- F.A. Vase best performance: Fifth round 2009–10, 2024–25

=== Season-by-season record since 1989 ===
Season	Division	Points	Position	League Cup	F.A. Cup	F.A. Vase	F.A. Trophy	County Cup	Notes
1989–90	United Counties League Division One	81	1/19		DTE				
1990–91	United Counties League Division One	95	1/19		DTE				First season at Elderstubbs
1991–92	United Counties League Premier Division	64	14/24		DTE	Pre			
1992–93	United Counties League Premier Division	79	5/22		DTE	Ex Pre			
1993–94	United Counties League Premier Division	35	20/22		Pre	Pre			
1994–95	United Counties League Division One	14	19/19		DTE				
1995–96	United Counties League Division One	41	12/19		DTE	DNE			
1996–97	United Counties League Division One	36	13/18		DTE	DNE			
1997–98	United Counties League Division One	53	7/18		DTE	DNE			
1998–99	United Counties League Division One	46	10/18		DTE	DNE			
1999–00	United Counties League Division One	64	5/18		DTE	DNE			
2000–01	United Counties League Division One	75	1/18		DTE	DNE			
2001–02	United Counties League Premier Division	46	15/21		DTE				
2002–03	United Counties League Premier Division	56	10/21		DTE	2 QR			
2003–04	United Counties League Premier Division	22	22/22		Ex Pre	2 QR		R 1	
2004–05	United Counties League Premier Division	34	22/22		Ex Pre	2 QR		R 1	
2005–06	United Counties League Division One	51	6/18			2 QR		R 2	
2006–07	United Counties League Division One	53	4/16					R 1	
2007–08	United Counties League Division One	81	1/16	Finalist					
2008–09	United Counties League Premier Division	70	7/21			R 3			−3 Points
2009–10	United Counties League Premier Division	102	1/21		1 Q	R 5			
2010–11	Southern League Division One Central	81	3/22		PRE		2 Q		−6 Points
2011–12	Southern League Division One Central	50	16/22		3 Q		2 Q		
2012–13	Southern League Division One Central	76	8/22		2 Q		PRE	Finalist	
2013–14	Southern League Division One Central	86	4/22		R 1		R 1	Winners	
2014–15	Southern League Division One Central	42	19/22		1 Q		PRE		
2015–16	Northern Premier League Division One South	33	21/22	R 3	PRE		PRE		
2016–17	United Counties League Division One	87	1/19	R 1	Ex Pre	R 1	.		
2017–18	United Counties League Premier Division	67	10/22	Q.F.	Ex Pre	2 Q	.		
2018–19	United Counties League Premier Division	94	1/20	Winners	1 Q	1 Q		R 1	
2019–20	Southern League Division One Central	0	0		Pre		Ex Pre	Finalist	Season Expunged – Coronavirus
2020–21	Southern League Division One Central	0	0		1 Q		2 Q	Not played	Season Expunged – Coronavirus
2021–22	Northern Premier League Division One Midlands	39	16/20		Pre		2 Q		
2022–23	Northern Premier League Division One Midlands	24	19/20		Ex Pre		1 Q		
2023–24	United Counties League Premier Division South	51	9/20		Ex Pre	1 Q			
2024–25	United Counties League Premier Division South		?/19		Ex Pre				

Key – Ex Pre = Extra preliminary round, Pre = Preliminary round, 1 Q = First round qualifying, 2 Q = Second round qualifying, R 1 = First round, DNE = Did not Enter

Source: Football Club History Database

== Former players ==
1. Players that have played/managed in the football league or any foreign equivalent to this level (i.e. fully professional league).

- (Republic of Ireland) David Bevan
- (England) Mark Bellingham
- (England) Liam Dolman
- (England) Warren Donald
- (England) Howard Forinton
- (England) Lee Hendrie
- (England) Stuart Hendrie
- (England) Bert Howe
- (Republic of Ireland) Mark Kinsella
- (England) George Thomson
- (England) Paul Lamb
- (England) Michael Bryan
- (England) Dior Angus
- (England) Tom TJ James
- (England) Melanius Mullarkey
- (England) Miles Welch-Hayes
- (England) Robbie Cundy
- (England) Joe Henderson
- (England) Jack Finch
- (England) Oran Jackson
- (England) Leon Lobjoit

2. Players that hold a club record or have captained the club.

- (England) Liam Dolman
- (England) Ash Deeney
- (England) Ricky Hill
- (England) Ross Harris
- (England) Oran Jackson
