= St Ives Town F.C. =

Association football club in England

Coordinates: 52°19′49.51″N 0°04′55.79″W

St. Ives Town
- Full name: St. Ives Town Football Club
- Nickname: The Saints
- Founded: 1887
- Ground: Westwood Road, St Ives
- Capacity: 2,000
- Chairman: Mark Taylor & Andy Dunn
- Manager: Tommy Cooney
- League: Northern Premier League Division One Midlands
- 2025–26: Southern League Premier Division Central, 19th of 22 (relegated)
- Website: http://www.stivestownfc.co.uk
Home colours	Away colours

St. Ives Town Football Club is a football club based in St Ives, Cambridgeshire, England. They are currently members of the Northern Premier League Division One Midlands and play at Westwood Road.

== History ==
St Ives Town Football Club was formed in 1887. They joined the Central Amateur League in 1949, but the league folded at the end of the 1949–50 season. The club briefly played in the United Counties Football League Division Two for two seasons in the early 1950s. They rejoined the United Counties Football League Division One in 1985–86, and gained promotion to the Premier Division in 2004–05 after a third-placed finish. They reached the Fifth Round of the FA Vase in 2007–08, 2008–09 and 2009–10, and reached the Quarter Finals in 2011–12. They won promotion to the Southern Football League after finishing second in the United Counties League Premier Division in 2012–13. They also produced Conor Washington who now plays at Charlton Athletic F.C. and has made several appearances for Northern Ireland. In the 2015–16 season, the club earned promotion to the Southern League Premier Division via the play-offs, defeating AFC Rushden & Diamonds in the final on 2 May 2016 in front of 1,523.

== Current squad ==
As of 23 August 2026

Note: Flags indicate national team as defined under FIFA eligibility rules; some limited exceptions apply. Players may hold more than one non-FIFA nationality.

No.	Pos.	Nation	Player
—	GK	AUS	Alex Fisher
—	GK	ENG	Jonah Gill
—	DF	ENG	Matty Miles
—	DF	ENG	Callum Milne
—	DF	USA	Sam Tessler
—	DF	ENG	Josh Ward
—	MF	ENG	Andrian Ankrah
—	MF	ENG	Kellan Hickinson
—	MF	ENG	Ethan Keogh
—	MF	ENG	Dan Lawlor

No.	Pos.	Nation	Player
—	MF	ENG	Alfie Shepherd
—	MF	POR	Junior Varela
—	MF	ENG	Ezekiel Williams
—	FW	ENG	Mbunya Alemanji
—	FW	ENG	Romari Forde
—	FW	ENG	Mark Jones
—	FW	ENG	Jessi Obeng
—	FW	ENG	Archie Riordan

== Management and coaching staff ==
=== Boardroom ===
As of 18 June 2022

Position	Name
Chairman	Mark Taylor & Andy Dunn

=== Current staff ===
As of 18 June 2022

Position	Name
Manager	Tommy Cooney
Assistant Manager	Luis Navarro
First Team Coach	(England) Mark Field
Goalkeeper Coach	(England) Harry o’Brien
Sports Therapist	(England) Jardaine Patel-Joseph

=== Managerial history ===
Period	Manager
2002–2014	(England) Warren Everdell (England) Jeremy Hall
2014–2021	(England) Ricky Marheineke
2021–2022	(England) Mike Ford (England) Ricky Marheineke
2022–2026	(England) Ricky Marheineke

== Records ==
- FA Cup
  - Fourth Qualifying Round 2022–23
- FA Trophy
  - Second Round 2020–21, 2023–24
- FA Vase
  - Quarter Finals 2011–12
- Neo Dobson appearance 2025-26 / 2026-27

== See also ==
- St Ives Town F.C. players
