= Long Buckby A.F.C. =

Association football club in England

Coordinates: 52.297651°N 1.081483°W

Long Buckby
- Full name: Long Buckby Association Football Club
- Nickname: The Bucks
- Founded: 1937
- Ground: Station Road, Long Buckby
- Capacity: 1,000 (200 seated)
- Manager: Jamie Jollands
- League: Northamptonshire Combination Premier Division
- 2025–26: Spartan South Midlands League Division One, 13th of 21 (resigned)
Home colours	Away colours

Long Buckby Association Football Club is a football club based in Long Buckby, near Northampton, Northamptonshire, England. They are currently members of the Northamptonshire Combination Premier Division and play at Station Road.

== History ==
The club was established in 1937 as Long Buckby Nomads, but reformed under the current name in 1945. They initially played in the Rugby & District League, before becoming founder members of the Northamptonshire Combination in 1953, joining Division One. The club were Division One runners-up in the league's inaugural season. In 1968 they moved up to Division Three of the United Counties League.

Long Buckby were Division Three champions in 1969–70, earning promotion to Division Two. Although they were Division Two champions the following season, the club were not promoted to the Division One due to their ground not meeting the requirements of the league. However, they were Division Two champions again in 1971–72 and were promoted, with Division One renamed the Premier Division the following season; the 1971–72 season had also seen the club win the league's Knock-Out Cup, the Northamptonshire Junior Cup and the Daventry Charity Cup. They were Premier Division runners-up in 1984–85 and won the Knock-Out Cup again the following season. The club were Premier Division runners-up for a second time in 2007–08.

In 2008–09 Long Buckby won the Hillier Cup, beating Brackley Town 2–0 in the final. In July 2009 they won the Maunsell Cup, beating Northampton Town 3–2. The 2011–12 season saw the club win the Premier Division title. However, the club were not promoted as their Station Road ground failed to meet ground grading criteria. They slumped to sixteenth place in the Premier Division the following season, and after finishing bottom of the Premier Division in 2014–15, the club were relegated to Division One. In 2021 they were promoted to back to the Premier Division South based on their results in the abandoned 2019–20 and 2020–21 seasons. The club finished bottom of the Premier Division South in 2022–23 and were relegated to Division One of the Spartan South Midlands League.

== Ground ==
The club play at Station Road, also known as the Sports Field. They moved to a new pitch on the same site during the 1990s, also building a 200-seat Emms Stand. The ground has a capacity of 1,000.

== Management ==
Position	Name
Manager	Jamie Jollands
Assistant Manager	Ben Collins
Coach	Henry Spears

== Honours ==
- United Counties League
  - Premier Division champions 2011–12
  - Division Two champions 1970–71, 1971–72
  - Division Three champions 1969–70
  - Knock-Out Cup winners 1971–72, 1984–85
- Northamptonshire Junior Cup
  - Winners 1971–72
- Hillier Cup
  - Winners 2008–09
- Maunsell Cup
  - Winners 2009–10

== Records ==
- Best FA Cup performance: Third qualifying round, 2011–12
- Best FA Vase performance: Fifth round, 2009–10, 2010–11
- Record attendance: 750 vs Kettering Town

== See also ==
- Long Buckby A.F.C. players
- Long Buckby A.F.C. managers
