= Kempston Rovers F.C. =

Association football club in England

Coordinates: 52.1270°N 0.4892°W

Kempston Rovers
- Full name: Kempston Rovers Football Club
- Nickname: The Walnut Boys
- Founded: 1884
- Ground: Hillgrounds Leisure, Kempston
- Capacity: 2,000 (152 seated)
- Chairman: Steve Brookes
- Manager: Leon Cashman
- League: Spartan South Midlands League Premier Division
- 2025–26: Spartan South Midlands League Premier Division, 19th of 20
| Home colours | Away colours |

Kempston Rovers Football Club is a football club based in Kempston, Bedfordshire, England. Affiliated to the Bedfordshire County Football Association, they are currently members of the Spartan South Midlands League Premier Division and play at Hillgrounds Leisure.

== History ==
The club are thought to have been founded in 1884, although the first evidence of their existence dates to 1887 when the Kempston Rovers rugby club played their first football match. At the rugby club's AGM in 1891, it was decided to create a football team called Kempston Montrose. Three years later Kempston Montrose folded and its assets transferred to Kempston Association. An 1895 meeting saw another new team formed, Kempston Rovers. They gained the nickname "the Walnut boys" due to Kempston being well known for its walnuts.

The club initially played in both the Bedford & District League and the Biggleswade & District League; they won the Bedford & District League in 1907–08 and 1908–09 (a season in which they also won the Bedfordshire Senior Cup for the first time) and the Biggleswade & District League in 1910–11 and 1911–12. In 1927 they joined the Bedfordshire & District County League, which became the South Midlands League in 1929, where they remained until switching to Division Two of the United Counties League in 1953. They won the division in 1955–56, and the following season Division Two and One were merged into one league in which Kempston finished runners-up. In 1957–58, the club were United Counties League champions. The league was split into two division again in 1961–62 and Kempston were placed in Division Two. Despite finishing tenth that season, they were promoted to Division One.

In 1973 Division One was renamed the Premier Division and in 1974–75 Kempston were league champions again, also reaching the fifth round of the FA Vase. In 1978–79 Kempston reached the fourth qualifying round of the FA Cup, the furthest they have ever got in the competition. They repeated their record FA Vase run in 1980–81, again reaching the fifth round. Rovers were relegated to Division One at the end of the 1982–83 season, having finished bottom of the Premier Division, but were promoted again in 1985–86 after winning Division One.

The club won the Huntingdonshire Premier Cup for the first time in 1999–2000, retaining it the following season. The club was relegated again in 2003, and in 2004 were renamed AFC Kempston Rovers name following the merger of Kempston Rovers, Kempston Colts and Kempston Town. After finishing third in Division One in 2006–07 they were promoted to the Premier Division, but were relegated at the end of the following season. In 2010–11, the club was again promoted to the Premier Division after winning Division One for the third time. In 2015–16 the club won the Premier Division, earning promotion to Division One Central of the Southern League for the first time in their history. In 2017 the division was renamed Division One East, before reverting back to its previous name the following year. The club finished bottom of Division One Central in 2023–24 and were relegated to the Premier Division of the Spartan South Midlands League.

== Ground ==
The club's Hillgrounds Leisure ground is located on Hillgrounds Road, near parkland beside the River Great Ouse. A new third generation training area has been built with the funding of the Football Foundation as well as a new set of changing rooms, board room, and physiotherapy room.

== Other teams ==
The club's reserve team entered Division Three of the UCL in 1970. After a third-placed finish in a renamed Division Two in 1974–75, they were promoted to Division One. In 1980 the UCL created a dedicated reserves division, which the team were transferred to.

== Honours ==
- United Counties League
  - Premier Division champions 1957–58, 1973–74, 2015–16
  - Division One champions 1955–56, 1985–86, 2010–11
  - Premier Division Knock-Out Cup winners 1974–75, 1976–77
  - Division One Knock-Out Cup winners 1957–58, 1959–60
  - Division Two Knock-Out Cup winners 1955–56, 1974–75
- Bedford & District League
  - Division One champions 1907–08, 1908–09
  - Division Two South champions 1922–23, 1933–34
- Biggleswade & District League
  - Champions 1910–11, 1911–12
- Bedfordshire Senior Cup
  - Winners 1908–09, 1937–38, 1976–77, 1991–92
- Huntingdonshire Premier Cup
  - Winners 1999–2000, 2000–01
- Hinchingbrooke Cup
  - Winners 1926–27, 1928–29, 2010–11
- North Bedfordshire Charity Cup
  - Winners 1908–09, 1934–35, 1999–2000, 2000–01, 2015–16

== Records ==
- Best FA Cup performance: Fourth qualifying round, 1978–79
- Best FA Trophy performance: First qualifying round, 2016–17
- Best FA Vase performance: Fifth round 1974–75, 1980–81

== See also ==
- Kempston Rovers F.C. players
- Kempston Rovers F.C. managers
