= Bourne Town F.C. =

Association football club in Lincolnshire, England

Coordinates: 52°46.0080′N 0°22.326′W

Bourne Town
- Full name: Bourne Town Football Club
- Nickname: The Wakes
- Founded: 1883
- Ground: Abbey Lawn, Bourne
- Capacity: 2,000
- Chairman: Mark Lynch
- Manager: Shane Clarke
- League: Northern Premier League Division One Midlands
- 2025–26: Northern Premier League Division One Midlands, 19th of 22
Home colours	Away colours

Bourne Town Football Club is a football club based in Bourne, Lincolnshire, England. Affiliated to the Lincolnshire Football Association, they are currently members of the Northern Premier League Division One Midlands and play at Abbey Lawn.

== History ==
The club was established in 1883 and joined the Peterborough & District League in 1911. Although they left the league in 1929, they returned the following season and were Division One champions in 1933–34. They left the league again in 1935, but returned in 1937 and went on to win the league for a second time in 1939–40. After World War II the club were champions in 1945–46 and 1946–47. In 1947 they joined the United Counties League, but struggled in the new league, finishing second-from-bottom in 1948–49 and 1949–50, bottom in 1953–54 and second-from-bottom again in 1954–55 and 1955–56. After leaving the league in 1956, they rejoined the Peterborough & District League, before switching to Division One South of the Central Alliance in 1958.

Bourne won Division One South in 1959–60, and in 1961 they joined the newly reformed Midland League. After finishing second-from-bottom in 1964–65, they returned to the United Counties League, and were placed in Division One. They finished as runners-up in their first season back in the league, and went on to win back-to-back league titles in 1968–69 and 1969–70, also winning the Knock-Out Cup in the latter season. A third title was won in 1971–72, after which Division One was renamed the Premier Division. The club won the league for a fourth time in 1990–91, a season which also saw them win the league's Benevolent Cup. They remained in the Premier Division until the 2009–10 season, when they were demoted to Division One due to FA ground grading regulations as the Abbey Lawn was not fully enclosed. In 2022–23 the club finished third in Division One, qualifying for the promotion play-offs, losing 4–2 on penalties to Hucknall Town in the semi-finals after a 1–1 draw. The following season saw them win the Division One title, securing promotion to the Premier Division North, which had been enabled by ground improvements.

In 2024–25 Bourne were Premier Division North runners-up, qualifying for the promotion play-offs. After beating AFC Mansfield 4–0 in the semi-finals, they defeated Boston Town 8–7 on penalties in the final to earn promotion to Division One Midlands of the Northern Premier League.

=== Other teams ===
The reserve team has competed in the Peterborough & District League, the Lincolnshire League and the United Counties League.

Between 1952 and 1956 the club also entered an 'A' Team in the Peterborough & District League. The 'A' Team was resurrected at the start of the 2022–23 season and rejoined the Peterborough & District League, playing at Elsea Park. After winning back-to-back league titles the 'A' Team merged with the reserve team for the 2024–25 season and achieved a third consecutive promotion.

== Ground ==
Since being formed in 1883 the club has played home fixtures at the Abbey Lawn on Abbey Road. The Abbey Lawn is a sports facility owned by Bourne United Charities and also home to Bourne Cricket Club, Bourne Town Bowls Club, Bourne Abbots Petanque Club, Bourne & District Lawn Tennis Club, Bourne Outdoor Swimming Pool and the Dimension Skate Park.

The football facility consists of a large clubhouse (named the Len Pick Suite in 2006 after a former president who left money to the club that was used to redevelop the building), a covered standing terrace and a covered bench seated stand (named the Terry Bates Stand in 2020). Floodlights were installed in 1989. Two new stands were erected in 2024.

Peterborough United Women played their home fixtures at the Abbey Lawn between 2022–23 and 2024–25.

== Nickname ==
The club are nicknamed 'The Wakes'. The name was chosen following a competition arranged by the club after World War II. The name refers to the town's association with Hereward the Wake, who is believed to have been born in or close to the town. He was an Anglo-Saxon nobleman and a leader of local resistance to the Norman Conquest of England in the 11th century.

== Honours ==
- United Counties League
  - Premier Division champions 1968–69, 1969–70, 1971–72, 1990–91
  - Division One champions 2023–24
  - Knock-Out Cup winners 1969–70
  - Benevolent Cup winners 1990–91
- Central Alliance
  - Division One South champions 1959–60
- Peterborough & District League
  - Champions 1933–34, 1939–40, 1945–46, 1946–47
- Lincolnshire Senior A Cup
  - Winners 1971–72, 2005–06
- Lincolnshire Senior B Cup
  - Winners 1960–61
- Lincolnshire Intermediate Cup
  - Winners 1985–86
- Lincolnshire Junior Cup
  - Winners 1939–40
- Peterborough Senior Cup
  - Winners 1933–34, 1938–39, 1945–46

== Records ==
- Best FA Cup performance: Third qualifying round, 1961–62, 1962–63, 1965–66
- Best FA Amateur Cup performance: First qualifying round, 1935–36
- Best FA Trophy performance: Second round, 2026–27
- Best FA Vase performance: Quarter-finals, 2024–25
- Record attendance: 4,000 vs Billingborough, Ancaster Cup Final, 1922
- Most goals: David Scotney

== See also ==
- Bourne Town F.C. players
- Bourne Town F.C. managers
