= Buckingham Town F.C. =

Association football club in England

Coordinates: 51°59′48″N 0°59′16″W

Buckingham Town
- Full name: Buckingham Town Football Club
- Nickname: The Robins
- Founded: 1883
- Dissolved: 2020
- Ground: Ford Meadow, Buckingham (1883–2011); Winslow Centre, Winslow (2011–12); Manor Fields, Milton Keynes (2012–20)
Home colours	Away colours

Buckingham Town Football Club, known as Milton Keynes Robins for the last year of their existence, was a football club based in Buckingham, Buckinghamshire, England. They were established in 1883 and were one of the founding members of the Hellenic League in 1953. After lasting only four seasons they returned to local football, not re-emerging at a higher level until 1974. Having fallen into financial trouble by 2017 and having been evicted from their ground in 2011, they relocated permanently to Milton Keynes in 2019. The club was merged into Milton Keynes Irish a year later.

== History ==
The club was established as Buckingham Town in 1883, playing their first match against Banbury United. They won the Aylesbury & District League in 1902–03 and 1936–37 and the North Bucks League in 1924–25, 1928–29, 1933–34, 1935–36, 1936–37, 1938–39, 1948–49 and 1949–50. They were founder members of the Hellenic League in 1953, but left after only four seasons. They won the Aylesbury & District League again in 1967–68.

Buckingham Town joined Division One of the South Midlands League in 1971, where they played until joining Division Two of the United Counties League in 1974. Their first season in the league saw them finish second, earning promotion to Division One. After finishing as Division One runners-up in 1975–76, the club secured a second successive promotion, moving up to the Premier Division. They were Premier Division champions and Knockout Cup winners in 1983–84, and the following season they reached the first round of the FA Cup for the first (and to date only) time in their history, losing 2–0 at home to Orient.

In 1985–86 Buckingham Town won the Premier Division again and were promoted to the Midland Division of the Southern League. After being transferred to the Southern Division in 1988, they won the division in 1990–91, but were not promoted as their ground failed to meet the standards required. They were moved back to the Midland Division in 1994, but returned to the Southern Division in 1996. However, after finishing bottom of the division in 1996–97, they were relegated back to the Premier Division of the United Counties League. The 2006–07 season saw them finish bottom of the Premier Division, resulting in relegation to Division One. The club announced that they were folding at the end of the 2017–18 season. However, the decision was later reversed.

The club was renamed Milton Keynes Robins in January 2019. In May 2020 the club merged with Unite MK and Milton Keynes Irish Veterans merged to form Milton Keynes Irish.

=== League record ===
Season	Division	Position	Notes
1953–54	Hellenic League	7	
1954–55	Hellenic League	15	
1955–56	Hellenic League	14	
1956–57	Hellenic League Premier Division	13	
1974–75	United Counties League Division Two	2	Runners–up
1975–76	United Counties League Division One	2	Runners–up
1976–77	United Counties League Premier Division	11	
1977–78	United Counties League Premier Division	8	
1978–79	United Counties League Premier Division	13	
1979–80	United Counties League Premier Division	11	
1980–81	United Counties League Premier Division	11	
1981–82	United Counties League Premier Division	4	
1982–83	United Counties League Premier Division	10	
1983–84	United Counties League Premier Division	1	Champions
1984–85	United Counties League Premier Division	3	
1985–86	United Counties League Premier Division	1	Champions, promoted
1986–87	Southern League Midland Division	13	
1987–88	Southern League Midland Division	11	
1988–89	Southern League Southern Division	16	
1989–90	Southern League Southern Division	3	
1990–91	Southern League Southern Division	1	Champions
1991–92	Southern League Southern Division	5	
1992–93	Southern League Southern Division	12	
1993–94	Southern League Southern Division	12	
1994–95	Southern League Midland Division	6	
1995–96	Southern League Midland Division	9	
1996–97	Southern League Southern Division	22	Relegated
1997–98	United Counties League Premier Division	11	
1998–99	United Counties League Premier Division	9	
1999–00	United Counties League Premier Division	19	
2000–01	United Counties League Premier Division	17	
2001–02	United Counties League Premier Division	16	
2002–03	United Counties League Premier Division	4	
2003–04	United Counties League Premier Division	2	Runners–up
2004–05	United Counties League Premier Division	13	
2005–06	United Counties League Premier Division	14	
2006–07	United Counties League Premier Division	21	Relegated
2007–08	United Counties League Division One	8	
2008–09	United Counties League Division One	8	
2009–10	United Counties League Division One	13	

== Ground ==
Buckingham Town played at Ford Meadow from 1883 until being evicted at the end of the 2010–11 season. The 3.58-acre site included a football pitch, two stands, a clubhouse, changing rooms and a large hard area. After leaving Ford Meadow, the club played at the Winslow Centre in Winslow for the 2011–12 season, before moving to Manor Fields in the Fenny Stratford area of Milton Keynes.

== Honours ==
- Southern League
  - Southern Division champions 1990–91
- United Counties League
  - Premier Division champions 1983–84, 1985–86
  - Knockout Cup winners 1983–84
- Aylesbury & District League
  - Champions 1902–03, 1936–37, 1967–68
- North Bucks League
  - Champions 1924–25, 1928–29, 1933–34, 1935–36, 1936–37, 1938–39, 1948–49, 1949–50

== Records ==
- Best FA Cup performance: First round, 1984–85
- Best FA Trophy performance: First qualifying round, 1994–95, 1995–96, 1996–97
- Best FA Vase performance: Quarter-finals, 1990–91, 1992–93
- Record transfer fee received: £1,000 from Kettering Town for Terry Stevens
- Record transfer fee paid: £7,000 to Wealdstone for Steve Jenkins, 1992

== See also ==
- Buckingham Town F.C. players
- Buckingham Town F.C. managers
