= Daventry United F.C. =

Coordinates: 52°15′57.61″N 1°11′15.41″W

Daventry United
- Full name: Daventry United Football Club
- Nickname(s): The Motormen
- Founded: 1968 (as Ford Sports Daventry)
- Dissolved: 2012
- Ground: Royal Oak Way; Daventry
- Capacity: 1,000
- 2011–12: United Counties League; Premier Division, 15th (resigned)
Home colours	Away colours

Daventry United Football Club was an association football club based in Daventry, England. The club played in the United Counties League Premier Division.

== History ==
The club was established in 1968 as Ford Sports Daventry and were one of the youngest clubs in the United Counties Football League in which they played since joining in 1977. They started in the Central Northants Combination where they had success with both the 1st and 2nd teams, in those years they had to hire council pitches. In 1972 they moved to Royal Oak. In 1977 they finally joined the United Counties League. In 1979 they were promoted to Division One. They won Division One twice. Daventry United had reached the Third Round of the FA Vase twice in their history and after many years of hard work and recruiting better players they made it into the Premier Division in 1996. They had their best FA Cup run in 1998–99 under the coaches Richard Green and Kevin Flear. They eventually lost to Sutton United in a very hard-fought match.

Thereafter, The Motormen (as they were nicknamed) played in the United Counties Football League Premier Division until 2007, when they finished in 20th place. They were relegated to Division One following the accepted promotion for AFC Kempston Rovers. Their first season at level 11 of the English football league system saw them narrowly miss out on a return to level 10 at the first attempt, as they finished level on goal difference with Huntingdon Town and Rothwell Corinthians, both of whom eventually got promoted.

The 2008–09 season saw them eventually claim promotion, after finishing runners-up on 64 points, 12 points behind winners Peterborough Northern Star.

After the Ford Motor Company withdrew the use of Royal Oak in 2010, the club had been ground sharing at Community Park. The club folded at the end of the 2011–12 season.

== Honours ==
- United Counties League Premier Division
  - Champions 1999–2000, 2001–02
- United Counties League Division One
  - Champions 1992–93, 1995–96
  - Runners-up 2008–09
- United Counties League Division Two
  - Runners-up 1978–79

== Records ==
- FA Cup
  - Third Qualifying Round 1998–99
- FA Vase
  - Third Round 2002–03, 2005–06
