= St Neots Town F.C. =

Association football club in England

Coordinates: 52°13′59″N 0°14′42″W

St Neots Town
- Full name: St Neots Town Football Club
- Nickname: The Saints
- Founded: 1879; 147 years ago
- Ground: Rowley Park, St Neots
- Capacity: 3,500 (260 Seated)
- Owner: Saints FC Ltd
- Chairman: Mark Gearing
- Manager: Cameron Mawer
- League: United Counties League Premier Division South
- 2025–26: Northern Premier League Division One Midlands, 20th of 22 (relegated)
- Website: http://stneotstownfc.co.uk/
Home colours	Away colours

St Neots Town Football Club is an English semi-professional football club based in St Neots, Cambridgeshire. The club are currently members of the Northern Premier League Division One Midlands, but will play in the United Counties League in the 2026/27 season following relegation. Founded in 1879 and known as "The Saints", St Neots Town play their home matches at Rowley Park, known as the Premier Plus Ltd stadium for sponsorship reasons.

The club have played in a number of local leagues, starting off in the Biggleswade & District League before moving first to the South Midlands League in 1927, then the United Counties League in 1936 and finally the Southern Football League in 2011. The club has enjoyed success since promotion in 2011, clinching the Division One Central League title at the first attempt, before adding the Southern Football League Cup to their honours list in 2014.

The club were nominated for Best Non League Football Club in the Football Content Awards 2025, showing the Saints' growing digital presence.

The club won promotion as champions into the Northern Premier League Division One Midlands in 2025, but were relegated back to the United Counties League the year later in 2026, with a 20th placed finish.

== History ==
St Neots Town was formed in 1879 when it was known as plain 'St Neots'. The club clinched its first honour when it became inaugural winners of the Huntingdonshire Senior Cup in 1888–89. They went on to win the cup another four times before the turn of the century in 1892–93, 1894–95, 1895–96 and 1896–97. In the 1901/02 season the Club recorded its first known ‘double’ when it won the Hunts Senior Cup, for the sixth time, and the Fellowes Cup. During this period they played in the Biggleswade & District League.

For the 1924–25 season the club was renamed St Neots & District and celebrated by winning the Hunts Senior Cup again. By 1927 they had joined the Bedfordshire & District League, which later became the South Midlands League in 1929. The South Midlands League title was clinched in 1932–33. Progression came in 1936 with entry to the United Counties League, however, after World War II they rejoined the South Midlands League, before becoming founder members of the Metropolitan League in 1949. They won the league and league cup double in its first season, but returned to the UCL in 1951.

In 1956 they switched leagues again, joining Division One South of the Central Alliance. The following year the club was renamed for the third time to its present name St Neots Town F.C. In 1960 they returned to the Metropolitan League and won the Professional Cup in 1964–65. In 1966–67 St Neots enjoyed their best run to date in the FA Cup reaching the first round proper, where they were beaten 2–0 away at Walsall. They went on to win the United Counties League and League Cup double in 1967–68 after rejoining the season earlier. The following season they retained the league cup and also won the Huntingdonshire Senior Cup for the twelfth consecutive season, a record for senior cups in England.

In 1969 the club transferred to the Eastern Counties League because it was felt it would be a stronger league, but returned for a fourth spell in the UCL Premier Division in 1973. They were relegated at the end of the 1981–82 season after eight years of moderate success, but made an immediate return the following season after finishing as runners-up in Division One. During the 1987–88 season the owner of their long term home at Shortsands yard sold it to a housing developer, meaning the club had to finish the season on a sub-standard borrowed works pitch. At the end of the 87–88 league season just four places from the bottom of the league table the club was forced to disband in order to clear its outstanding debt.

Out of football for just two seasons St Neots Town FC was reformed, in 1990, by a group of local men (John Delaney, Michael Stokes, Dave Crisp, Bob Page, John Carrol amongst others) and joined the Huntingdonshire Junior League, with a pitch at Priory Park, that was rented from the district council. After four consecutive titles and a six-year absence from senior football, they were readmitted to Division One of the UCL in 1994. They won Division One at the first attempt and were promoted to the Premier Division, where they would stay for the next 17 years.

The club's ambition to move on was shown with the 2009 addition of former Northern Ireland internationals Steve Lomas and Michael Hughes as a player managerial team, where they were joined by Sylvain Legwinski, formerly of Fulham.

Whilst these star names moved on, new manager Dennis Greene was able to bolster his side in late 2010 with the audacious signing of former Aston Villa striker Stefan Moore, fresh from scoring 39 goals for higher-level Halesowen Town. Moore helped fire St Neots to the 2010–11 UCL Premier Division title, with the club breaking a number of records on the way to promotion to the Division One Central at which they won as champions at the first attempt.

However, a series of management changes were to follow. At the start of the 2012–13 season manager Greene's position had become "untenable" leading to his resignation. He was replaced first by Iain Parr, before a joint management team of Gary King and Zema Abbey were drafted in from Arlesey Town in November 2013. The new management team led the Saints to victory in the Hunts Senior Cup and the 2013/14 Southern Football League Cup, with victory over Tiverton Town in the final. Poor performances at the beginning of 2014–15 season, however, saw the Abbey brothers, Nathan and Zema relieved of their duties. Gary King became the sole manager, bringing in Liam George as his assistant and promoting Matthew Spring to player/assistant coach. King resigned in late December 2014, and was replaced by David Batch. In December 2015, owner and chairman Mike Kearns stepped aside with his stake in the club acquired by the club's managing director, and Kearns' son, Lee.

Lee sold the club in 2025 to a consortium of new owners trading as Saints FC LTD.

== Stadium ==
St Neots originally played on the top part of the town common before moving to the Shortsands ground in the town centre in 1899. The Saints would remain at Shortsands for the next 88 years until they were evicted due to an outstanding debt. After being reformed in 1990 the club played in the Huntingdonshire Junior League and on the communal pitches within Priory Park.

In 1993 the club re-entered the United Counties League and moved to a new ground at Rowley Park, with an Arsenal XI providing the opposition for the ground's official opening. It was here they remained until the opening of the new Rowley Park in 2008. The multi-million pound complex which incorporates the stadium, banqueting venue, Club Bar and full size 3G artificial training pitch was funded and constructed by the site developers Gallagher Estates, who were building 1,250 homes on the Loves Farm site, which included the existing football ground.

== Records ==
=== St Neots & District FC ===
- Best FA Cup performance: Fourth qualifying round, 1938–39

=== St Neots Town FC ===
- Best FA Cup performance: First round, 1966–67
- Best FA Trophy performance: Second round, 2021–22
- Best FA Vase performance: Fifth round, 2001–02, 2010–11

== Honours ==
- Southern Football League
  - Division One Central champions 2011–12
  - League Cup Winners 2013–14
- United Counties League
  - Premier Division champions 1967–68, 2010–11
  - Premier Division South Champions 2024-25
  - Division One champions 1994–95
  - League Cup winners 1967–68, 1968–69
- Metropolitan League
  - Champions 1949–50
  - League Cup winners 1949–50
  - Professional Cup winners 1964–65
- South Midlands League
  - Champions 1932–33
- Huntingdonshire League
  - Champions 1990–91, 1991–92, 1992–93, 1993–94
- Huntingdonshire Senior Cup
  - Winners (39): 1888–89, 1892–93, 1894–95, 1895–96, 1896–97, 1901–02, 1924–25, 1927–28, 1935–36, 1936–37, 1937–38, 1938–39, 1953–54, 1955–56, 1957–58, 1958–59, 1959–60, 1960–61, 1961–62, 1962–63, 1963–64, 1964–65, 1965–66, 1966–67, 1967–68, 1968–69, 1970–71, 1971–72, 1973–74, 1976–77, 1977–78, 1979–80, 1980–81, 1997–98, 2009–10, 2010–11, 2012–13, 2013–14, 2024-25
- Hinchingbrooke Cup
  - Winners 2011–2012
- Fellowes Cup
  - Winners 1901–1902

== See also ==
- St Neots Town F.C. players
- St Neots Town F.C. managers
