= List of Brackley Town F.C. seasons =

Brackley Town Football Club is a football club in Brackley, Northamptonshire, England. They are currently members of the National League North, the sixth tier of English football, and play at St. James Park. The club won the FA Trophy in 2018.

== Early history ==
Established in 1890, the club spent much of the pre-World War I era in the Oxfordshire Senior League. After the war they switched to the North Bucks & District League, where they remained until transferring to the Banbury & District League. However, they rejoined the North Bucks League in 1974. In 1977 the club joined Division One of the Hellenic League.

== Key ==
Key to league record

- Level = Level of the league in the current league system
- Pld = Games played
- W = Games won
- D = Games drawn
- L = Games lost
- GF = Goals for
- GA = Goals against
- GD = Goals difference
- Pts = Points
- Position = Position in the final league table
- Top scorer and number of goals scored shown in bold when he was also top scorer for the division.

Key to cup records

- Res = Final reached round
- Rec = Final club record in the form of wins-draws-losses
- PR = Preliminary round
- QR1 (2, etc.) = Qualifying Cup rounds
- G = Group stage
- R1 (2, etc.) = Proper Cup rounds
- QF = Quarter-finalists
- SF = Semi-finalists
- F = Finalists
- A(QF, SF, F) = Area quarter-, semi-, finalists
- W = Winners

== Seasons ==
Year	League														Cup competitions						Manager
Year	Division	Lvl	Pld	W	D	L	GF	GA	GD	Pts	Position	Leading league scorer		Average attendance	FA Cup		FA Trophy		FA Vase		Manager
Year	Division	Lvl	Pld	W	D	L	GF	GA	GD	Pts	Position	Name	Goals	Average attendance	Res	Rec	Res	Rec	Res	Rec	Manager
Joined the Hellenic Football League from the North Bucks & District Football League
1977–78	**Hellenic Football League**; **Division One**		30	5	8	17	30	64	-34	23	15th of 16				—		—		—		
1978–79	**Hellenic Football League**; **Division One**		34	8	14	12	42	36	+6	30	12th of 18				—		—		—		
1979–80	**Hellenic Football League**; **Division One**		30	19	1	10	61	44	+17	39	5th of 16				—		—		—		
1980–81	**Hellenic Football League**; **Division One**		30	12	10	8	64	43	+21	34	7th of 16				—		—		—		
1981–82	**Hellenic Football League**; **Division One**		30	15	7	8	47	29	+18	37	6th of 16				—		—		—		
1982–83	**Hellenic Football League**; **Division One**		30	10	9	11	52	50	+2	29	7th of 16				—		—		—		
1983–84	**United Counties League**; **Division One**	8	30	22	6	2	70	21	+49	50	1st of 16				—		—		—		
1984–85	**United Counties League**; **Premier Division**	8	38	10	11	17	72	78	-6	31	16th of 20				—		—		—		
1985–86	**United Counties League**; **Premier Division**	8	40	10	10	20	52	70	-18	30	16th of 21				—		—		PR	1-0-1	
1986–87	**United Counties League**; **Premier Division**	8	40	16	9	25	70	66	+4	41	11th of 21				—		—		PR	1-0-1	
1987–88	**United Counties League**; **Premier Division**	8	40	14	7	19	52	57	-5	49	14th of 21				PR	0-0-1	—		R3	3-2-1	
1988–89	**United Counties League**; **Premier Division**	8	38	20	8	10	71	33	+38	68	2nd of 20				QR1	1-0-1	—		PR	0-1-1	
1989–90	**United Counties League**; **Premier Division**	8	42	12	10	20	46	67	-21	46	20th of 22				QR2	1-0-1	—		PR	0-0-1	
1990–91	**United Counties League**; **Premier Division**	8	42	9	10	23	51	83	-32	37	20th of 22				QR1	1-1-1	—		R1	1-0-1	
1991–92	**United Counties League**; **Premier Division**	8	46	3	7	36	39	135	-96	16	24th of 24				QR1	1-2-1	—		EPR	0-0-1	
1992–93	**United Counties League**; **Premier Division**	8	42	0	3	39	20	210	-190	3	22nd of 22				—		—		EPR	0-0-1	
1993–94	**United Counties League**; **Premier Division**	8	42	2	4	36	41	216	-175	10	22nd of 22				—		—		—		
1994–95	**Hellenic Football League**; **Premier Division**	8	30	7	5	18	42	80	-38	26	14th of 16				—		—		—		
1995–96	**Hellenic Football League**; **Premier Division**	8	34	19	12	3	60	32	+28	69	2nd of 18				—		—		R2	2-0-1	
1996–97	**Hellenic Football League**; **Premier Division**	8	34	25	6	3	79	20	+59	81	1st of 18				QR1	1-1-1	—		R2	2-0-1	
1997–98	**Southern Football League**; **Midland Division**	7	40	15	7	18	45	57	-12	52	13th of 22				QR2	2-1-1	QR1	0-1-1	—		
1998–99	**Southern Football League**; **Southern Division**	7	42	6	8	28	41	105	-64	26	22nd of 22				QR1	0-0-1	R1	0-0-1	—		
1999–2000	**Hellenic Football League**; **Premier Division**	8	36	21	6	9	66	32	+34	69	5th of 19				QR1	1-0-1	—		R2	0-0-1	Terry Muckleberg
2000–01	**Hellenic Football League**; **Premier Division**	8	38	25	8	5	84	45	+39	83	2nd of 20				PR	0-0-1	—		QR2	1-0-1	Peter Foley
2001–02	**Hellenic Football League**; **Premier Division**	8	42	20	9	13	70	55	+15	69	7th of 22				QR1	1-1-1	—		R2	1-0-1	Peter Foley
2002–03	**Hellenic Football League**; **Premier Division**	8	40	18	12	10	84	42	+42	66	7th of 21				PR	0-0-1	—		QR1	0-0-1	Tim Fowler
2003–04	**Hellenic Football League**; **Premier Division**	8	42	28	8	6	106	36	+70	92	1st of 22				QR1	2-0-1	—		QR1	0-0-1	Phil Lines
Conference North and Conference South, a new sixth tier leagues created
2004–05	**Southern Football League**; **Western Division**	8	42	18	10	14	69	53	+16	64	7th of 22			153	QR1	1-1-1	R1	1-0-1	—		Phil Lines
2005–06	**Southern Football League**; **Western Division**	8	42	23	9	10	71	34	+37	78	3rd of 22			154	QR4	2-1-1	QR1	0-1-1	—		Phil Lines
2005–06	**Southern Football League**; **Western Division**	8	Lost in the **play-off** semifinal												QR4	2-1-1	QR1	0-1-1	—		Phil Lines
2006–07	**Southern Football League**; **Division One Midlands**	8	42	29	4	9	95	53	+42	91	1st of 22			212	QR4	4-2-1	QR1	0-0-1	—		Phil Lines
2007–08	**Southern Football League**; **Premier Division**	7	42	16	12	14	57	53	+4	60	8th of 22			278	QR1	0-1-1	QR2	1-0-1	—		Roger Ashby; David Oldfield
2008–09	**Southern Football League**; **Premier Division**	7	42	15	12	15	69	62	+7	57	11th of 22			255	R1	4-1-1	R1	3-0-1	—		Phil Lines; Jon Brady
2009–10	**Southern Football League**; **Premier Division**	7	42	21	9	12	83	61	+22	72	5th of 22			282	QR2	1-0-1	QR2	1-1-1	—		Jon Brady
2009–10	**Southern Football League**; **Premier Division**	7	Lost in the **play-off** semifinal												QR2	1-0-1	QR2	1-1-1	—		Jon Brady
2010–11	**Southern Football League**; **Premier Division**	7	40	16	10	14	67	47	+20	58	9th of 21			218	QR2	1-1-1	QR3	2-1-1	—		Jon Brady
2011–12	**Southern Football League**; **Premier Division**	7	42	25	10	7	92	48	+44	85	1st of 22			278	QR1	0-0-1	R1	3-0-1	—		Jon Brady
2012–13	**Conference North**	6	42	26	7	9	76	44	+32	85	3rd of 22	Steve Diggin	13	377	QR3	1-0-1	R1	1-0-1	—		Jon Brady
2012–13	**Conference North**	6	Lost in the **play-off** final												QR3	1-0-1	R1	1-0-1	—		Jon Brady
2013–14	**Conference North**	6	42	18	15	9	66	45	+21	69	7th of 22	Steve Diggin	15	309	R2	4-3-1	QR3	0-1-1	—		Jon Brady
2014–15	**Conference North**	6	42	13	8	21	39	62	-23	47	18th of 22	Ryan Rowe	9	291	QR3	1-1-1	QR3	0-0-1	—		Jon Brady
Fifth and sixth tier divisions renamed
2015–16	**National League North**	6	42	11	13	18	45	54	-9	46	19th of 22	Steve Diggin	14	342	R1	3-2-1	QR3	0-0-1	—		Jon Brady; Kevin Wilkin
2016–17	**National League North**	6	42	20	13	9	66	43	+23	73	7th of 22	James Armson	14	427	R2	4-1-1	QF	4-3-1	—		Kevin Wilkin
2017–18	**National League North**	6	42	23	11	8	72	37	+35	80	3rd of 22	Aaron Williams	24	515	QR4	2-1-1	**W**	7-4-0	—		Kevin Wilkin
2017–18	**National League North**	6	Lost in the **play-off** final												QR4	2-1-1	**W**	7-4-0	—		Kevin Wilkin
2018–19	**National League North**	6	42	22	11	9	72	40	+32	77	3rd of 22	James Armson	14	616	QR3	1-1-1	QF	4-0-1	—		Kevin Wilkin
2018–19	**National League North**	6	Lost in the **play-off** semifinal												QR3	1-1-1	QF	4-0-1	—		Kevin Wilkin
2019–20	**National League North**	6	34	16	12	6	61	25	+36	60	4th of 22	Lee Ndlovu	20	525	QR4	2-0-1	QR3	0-0-1	—		Kevin Wilkin
2019–20	**National League North**	6	The regular season was cut short due to COVID-19, final league positions decided by points-per-game												QR4	2-0-1	QR3	0-0-1	—		Kevin Wilkin
2020–21	**National League North**	6	16	7	6	3	22	19	+3	27	4th of 22	Shane Byrne	6	– (Note: COVID-19 prevented fans from attending games)	R2	1-2-1	R2	1-1-0	—		Kevin Wilkin
2020–21	**National League North**	6	The season was declared null and void due to COVID-19												R2	1-2-1	R2	1-1-0	—		Kevin Wilkin
2021–22	**National League North**	6	42	25	12	5	53	23	+30	87	2nd of 22	Lee Ndlovu	14	743	QR4	2–2–1	R2	0–0–1	—		Kevin Wilkin
2021–22	**National League North**	6	Lost in the **play-off** semifinal												QR4	2–2–1	R2	0–0–1	—		Kevin Wilkin
2022–23	**National League North**	6	46	18	15	13	57	47	+10	69	4th of 24	Callum Stead	13	675	QR2	0–0–1	R2	0–0–1	—		Kevin Wilkin; Roger Johnson; Gareth Dean
2022–23	**National League North**	6	Lost in the **play-off** final												QR2	0–0–1	R2	0–0–1	—		Kevin Wilkin; Roger Johnson; Gareth Dean
2023–24	**National League North**	6	46	25	10	11	65	37	+28	85	3rd of 24	Danny Newton	19	783	QR3	1–1–1	R3	0–2–0	—		Gavin Cowan
2023–24	**National League North**	6	Lost in the **play-off** final												QR3	1–1–1	R3	0–2–0	—		Gavin Cowan
2024–25	**National League North**	6	46	29	5	12	75	42	+33	92	1st of 24	Connor Hall	18	887	R2	3–2–1	R2	0–0–1	—		Gavin Cowan
