= 1985–86 United Counties League =

The 1985–86 United Counties League season was the 79th in the history of the United Counties League, a football competition in England.

== Premier Division ==
United Counties League Premier Division
- Season: 1985–86
- Champions: Buckingham Town
- Promoted: Buckingham Town
- Relegated: Newport Pagnell Town
- Matches: 420
- Goals: 1,322 (3.15 per match)

The Premier Division featured 20 clubs which competed in the division last season, along with one new club:

- Northampton Spencer, promoted from Division One

=== League table ===
Pos	Team	Pld	W	D	L	GF	GA	GD	Pts	Promotion or relegation
1	Buckingham Town	40	25	10	5	78	31	+47	60	Promoted to the Southern Football League
2	Stewart & Lloyds Corby	40	24	11	5	85	32	+53	59	
3	Baldock Town	40	26	6	8	91	43	+48	58	
4	Irthlingborough Diamonds	40	22	8	10	69	45	+24	52	
5	Stamford	40	22	6	12	71	52	+19	50	
6	Long Buckby	40	18	10	12	75	54	+21	46	
7	Potton United	40	20	6	14	69	53	+16	46	
8	Wootton Blue Cross	40	16	11	13	63	58	+5	43	
9	Arlesey Town	40	16	9	15	63	57	+6	41	
10	Holbeach United	40	16	8	16	66	75	−9	40	
11	Northampton Spencer	40	15	10	15	64	74	−10	40	
12	Rothwell Town	40	17	5	18	60	62	−2	39	
13	Raunds Town	40	16	7	17	61	74	−13	39	
14	Ampthill Town	40	13	10	17	55	68	−13	36	
15	Desborough Town	40	11	9	20	70	89	−19	31	
16	Brackley Town	40	10	10	20	52	70	−18	30	
17	Bourne Town	40	9	12	19	43	71	−28	30	
18	St Neots Town	40	9	9	22	56	74	−18	27	
19	Stotfold	40	10	7	23	43	77	−34	27	
20	Eynesbury Rovers	40	7	12	21	45	86	−41	26	
21	Newport Pagnell Town	40	4	12	24	43	77	−34	20	Relegated to Division One

Source: nonleaguematters
Rules for classification: 1) points; 2) goal difference; 3) number of goals scored.

== Division One ==
United Counties League Division One
- Season: 1985–86
- Champions: Kempston Rovers
- Promoted: Kempston Rovers
- Matches: 342
- Goals: 1,155 (3.38 per match)

Division One featured 15 clubs which competed in the division last season, along with five new clubs:

- Baker Perkins, joined from the Peterborough and District League
- Cogenhoe United, joined from the Northamptonshire Combination
- Ramsey Town, joined from the Peterborough and District League
- St Ives Town, joined from the Peterborough and District League
- Wellingborough Whitworth, joined from the East Midlands Alliance

=== League table ===
Pos	Team	Pld	W	D	L	GF	GA	GD	Pts	Promotion
1	Kempston Rovers	36	25	7	4	89	32	+57	57	Promoted to the Premier Division
2	Towcester Town	36	24	7	5	74	25	+49	55	
3	Baker Perkins	36	23	7	6	87	36	+51	53	
4	Ramsey Town	36	22	6	8	94	42	+52	50	
5	Cottingham	36	19	10	7	69	48	+21	48	
6	Thrapston Venturas	36	18	6	12	77	45	+32	42	
7	St Ives Town	36	19	4	13	70	51	+19	42	
8	Higham Town	36	15	9	12	59	65	−6	39	
9	Irchester Eastfield	36	17	4	15	70	60	+10	38	
10	Wellingborough Whitworth	36	14	8	14	73	66	+7	36	
11	Mirrlees Blackstone	36	14	7	15	60	66	−6	35	
12	British Timken Athletic	36	9	12	15	62	58	+4	30	
13	Sharnbrook	36	11	7	18	44	63	−19	29	
14	British Timken Duston	36	13	3	20	54	83	−29	29	
15	Northampton ON Chenecks	36	10	8	18	39	77	−38	28	
16	Burton Park Wanderers	36	5	10	21	34	73	−39	20	
17	Olney Town	36	7	6	23	35	82	−47	20	
18	Cogenhoe United	36	7	3	26	35	73	−38	17	
19	Ford Sports Daventry	36	3	10	23	30	110	−80	16	
20	Corby Gainsborough	0	0	0	0	0	0	0	0	Resigned from the league, record expunged

Source: nonleaguematters
Rules for classification: 1) points; 2) goal difference; 3) number of goals scored.
