= 1990–91 United Counties League =

The 1990–91 United Counties League season was the 84th in the history of the United Counties League, a football competition in England.

== Premier Division ==
United Counties League Premier Division
- Season: 1990–91
- Champions: Bourne Town
- Relegated: Burton Park Wanderers
- Matches: 462
- Goals: 1,380 (2.99 per match)

The Premier Division featured 22 clubs which competed in the division last season, no new clubs joined the division this season.

=== League table ===
Pos	Team	Pld	W	D	L	GF	GA	GD	Pts	Promotion or relegation
1	Bourne Town	42	29	6	7	83	45	+38	93	
2	Rothwell Town	42	25	10	7	75	37	+38	85	
3	Eynesbury Rovers	42	24	9	9	68	42	+26	81	
4	Potton United	42	23	7	12	64	46	+18	76	
5	Northampton Spencer	42	22	8	12	84	59	+25	74	
6	Raunds Town	42	21	8	13	72	43	+29	71	
7	Desborough Town	42	19	13	10	62	40	+22	70	
8	Cogenhoe United	42	17	12	13	68	58	+10	63	
9	Long Buckby	42	18	8	16	60	64	−4	62	
10	Stotfold	42	18	5	19	71	59	+12	59	
11	Baker Perkins	42	17	8	17	56	59	−3	59	
12	Mirrlees Blackstone	42	16	10	16	61	59	+2	58	
13	Holbeach United	42	17	6	19	75	77	−2	57	
14	Irthlingborough Diamonds	42	13	10	19	80	81	−1	49	
15	Kempston Rovers	42	11	16	15	56	61	−5	49	
16	Wellingborough Town	42	11	16	15	54	65	−11	49	
17	Hamlet Stewart & Lloyds	42	11	14	17	49	54	−5	47	
18	Arlesey Town	42	11	13	18	57	75	−18	46	
19	Wootton Blue Cross	42	11	7	24	42	81	−39	40	
20	Brackley Town	42	9	10	23	51	83	−32	37	
21	Stamford	42	9	6	27	54	106	−52	33	
22	Burton Park Wanderers	42	5	8	29	38	86	−48	23	Relegated to Division One

Source: fchd
Rules for classification: 1) points; 2) goal difference; 3) number of goals scored.

== Division One ==
United Counties League Division One
- Season: 1990–91
- Champions: Daventry Town
- Promoted: Daventry Town
- Matches: 342
- Goals: 1,125 (3.29 per match)

Division One featured 18 clubs which competed in the division last season, along with one new club:

- Harrowby United, joined from the Midlands Regional Alliance

Also, Irchester Eastfield changed name to Irchester United.

=== League table ===
Pos	Team	Pld	W	D	L	GF	GA	GD	Pts	Promotion
1	Daventry Town	36	30	5	1	95	20	+75	95	Promoted to the Premier Division
2	Ramsey Town	36	30	3	3	119	23	+96	93	
3	Harrowby United	36	25	3	8	74	37	+37	78	
4	Newport Pagnell Town	36	17	11	8	57	40	+17	62	
5	Higham Town	36	17	10	9	53	36	+17	61	
6	Bugbrooke St Michaels	36	15	8	13	78	60	+18	53	
7	Olney Town	36	16	5	15	60	50	+10	53	
8	St Ives Town	36	15	5	16	55	48	+7	50	
9	Thrapston Venturas	36	14	7	15	67	64	+3	49	
10	Northampton ON Chenecks	36	13	8	15	48	53	−5	47	
11	Ampthill Town	36	13	7	16	62	73	−11	46	Transferred to the South Midlands League Division One
12	British Timken Duston	36	12	9	15	71	55	+16	45	
13	Ford Sports Daventry	36	13	6	17	50	80	−30	45	
14	Wellingborough Whitworth	36	12	8	16	62	79	−17	44	
15	Cottingham	36	11	10	15	39	62	−23	43	
16	Towcester Town	36	6	9	21	36	83	−47	27	
17	Blisworth	36	5	8	23	32	78	−46	23	
18	Sharnbrook	36	6	5	25	37	93	−56	23	
19	Irchester United	36	6	5	25	30	91	−61	23	

Source: fchd
Rules for classification: 1) points; 2) goal difference; 3) number of goals scored.
