= 1987–88 United Counties League =

The 1987–88 United Counties League season was the 81st in the history of the United Counties League, a football competition in England.

== Premier Division ==
United Counties League Premier Division
- Season: 1987–88
- Champions: Spalding United
- Promoted: Spalding United
- Matches: 420
- Goals: 1,314 (3.13 per match)

The Premier Division featured 19 clubs which competed in the division last season, along with two new clubs, promoted from Division One:

- Baker Perkins
- Cogenhoe United

=== League table ===
Pos	Team	Pld	W	D	L	GF	GA	GD	Pts	Promotion or relegation
1	Spalding United	40	28	6	6	97	35	+62	90	Promoted to the Southern Football League
2	Rothwell Town	40	23	7	10	81	56	+25	76	
3	Raunds Town	40	21	8	11	72	46	+26	71	
4	Potton United	40	19	12	9	76	38	+38	69	
5	Stotfold	40	20	9	11	72	49	+23	69	
6	Stewart & Lloyds Corby	40	18	13	9	95	60	+35	67	
7	Desborough Town	40	18	9	13	71	55	+16	63	
8	Northampton Spencer	40	19	5	16	65	53	+12	62	
9	Arlesey Town	40	17	9	14	60	65	−5	60	
10	Long Buckby	40	17	8	15	70	65	+5	59	
11	Cogenhoe United	40	15	10	15	58	64	−6	55	
12	Stamford	40	13	14	13	59	56	+3	53	
13	Irthlingborough Diamonds	40	12	14	14	53	52	+1	50	
14	Brackley Town	40	14	7	19	52	57	−5	49	
15	Baker Perkins	40	12	12	16	68	70	−2	48	
16	Eynesbury Rovers	40	12	12	16	56	72	−16	48	
17	Wootton Blue Cross	40	10	11	19	41	66	−25	41	
18	St Neots Town	40	9	8	23	35	84	−49	35	Resigned from the league
19	Kempston Rovers	40	6	15	19	46	82	−36	33	
20	Holbeach United	40	8	7	25	47	118	−71	31	
21	Bourne Town	40	6	10	24	40	71	−31	28	

Source: fchd
Rules for classification: 1) points; 2) goal difference; 3) number of goals scored.

== Division One ==
United Counties League Division One
- Season: 1987–88
- Champions: British Timken Duston
- Promoted: Mirrlees Blackstone
- Matches: 380
- Goals: 1,321 (3.48 per match)

Division One featured 17 clubs which competed in the division last season, along with three new clubs:

- Ampthill Town, relegated from the Premier Division
- Blisworth, joined from the Northamptonshire Combination
- Bugbrooke St Michaels, joined from the Northamptonshire Combination

=== League table ===
Pos	Team	Pld	W	D	L	GF	GA	GD	Pts	Promotion
1	British Timken Duston	38	29	4	5	123	27	+96	91	
2	Mirrlees Blackstone	38	26	6	6	99	31	+68	84	Promoted to the Premier Division
3	Blisworth	38	25	8	5	85	40	+45	83	
4	Burton Park Wanderers	38	22	6	10	73	36	+37	72	
5	Sharnbrook	38	22	5	11	80	40	+40	71	
6	Ramsey Town	38	22	4	12	95	64	+31	70	
7	St Ives Town	38	19	10	9	71	49	+22	67	
8	Irchester Eastfield	38	21	4	13	67	45	+22	67	
9	Higham Town	38	20	5	13	76	56	+20	65	
10	British Timken Athletic	38	20	3	15	70	68	+2	63	
11	Cottingham	38	18	8	12	68	50	+18	62	
12	Olney Town	38	12	9	17	60	70	−10	45	
13	Thrapston Venturas	38	12	5	21	48	80	−32	41	
14	Wellingborough Whitworth	38	12	5	21	51	86	−35	41	
15	Northampton ON Chenecks	38	9	5	24	42	72	−30	32	
16	Bugbrooke St Michaels	38	10	2	26	48	101	−53	32	
17	Towcester Town	38	9	5	24	55	117	−62	32	
18	Newport Pagnell Town	38	7	9	22	36	68	−32	30	
19	Ampthill Town	38	5	5	28	41	117	−76	20	
20	Ford Sports Daventry	38	2	8	28	33	104	−71	14	

Source: fchd
Rules for classification: 1) points; 2) goal difference; 3) number of goals scored.
