= 1986–87 United Counties League =

The 1986–87 United Counties League season was the 80th in the history of the United Counties League, a football competition in England.

== Premier Division ==
United Counties League Premier Division
- Season: 1986–87
- Champions: Potton United
- Promoted: Baldock Town
- Relegated: Ampthill Town
- Matches: 420
- Goals: 1,352 (3.22 per match)

The Premier Division featured 19 clubs which competed in the division last season, along with two new clubs:

- Kempston Rovers, promoted from Division One
- Spalding United, transferred from the Northern Counties East League

=== League table ===
Pos	Team	Pld	W	D	L	GF	GA	GD	Pts	Promotion or relegation
1	Potton United	40	31	7	2	103	25	+78	69	
2	Baldock Town	40	28	7	5	86	28	+58	63	Promoted to the Southern Football League
3	Stotfold	40	24	6	10	67	46	+21	54	
4	Irthlingborough Diamonds	40	21	9	10	72	57	+15	51	
5	Stewart & Lloyds Corby	40	22	6	12	81	52	+29	50	
6	Raunds Town	40	21	7	12	81	53	+28	49	
7	Spalding United	40	19	9	12	58	41	+17	47	
8	Holbeach United	40	18	10	12	79	45	+34	46	
9	Long Buckby	40	20	5	15	78	61	+17	45	
10	Stamford	40	15	14	11	53	49	+4	44	
11	Brackley Town	40	16	9	15	70	66	+4	41	
12	Northampton Spencer	40	15	10	15	76	70	+6	40	
13	Desborough Town	40	16	6	18	65	81	−16	38	
14	Wootton Blue Cross	40	14	9	17	67	83	−16	37	
15	Arlesey Town	40	12	10	18	50	68	−18	34	
16	Kempston Rovers	40	10	12	18	48	48	0	32	
17	Eynesbury Rovers	40	10	7	23	55	82	−27	27	
18	Rothwell Town	40	8	9	23	51	80	−29	25	
19	St Neots Town	40	4	14	22	37	75	−38	22	
20	Bourne Town	40	8	6	26	43	88	−45	22	
21	Ampthill Town	40	1	2	37	32	154	−122	4	Relegated to Division One

Source: fchd
Rules for classification: 1) points; 2) goal difference; 3) number of goals scored.

== Division One ==
United Counties League Division One
- Season: 1986–87
- Champions: Baker Perkins
- Promoted: Baker Perkins; Cogenhoe United
- Matches: 342
- Goals: 1,134 (3.32 per match)

Division One featured 18 clubs which competed in the division last season, along with one new club:

- Newport Pagnell Town, relegated from the Premier Division

=== League table ===
Pos	Team	Pld	W	D	L	GF	GA	GD	Pts	Promotion
1	Baker Perkins	36	28	2	6	102	33	+69	58	Promoted to the Premier Division
2	Cogenhoe United	36	25	5	6	93	31	+62	55	Promoted to the Premier Division
3	Ramsey Town	36	24	4	8	101	36	+65	52	
4	Mirrlees Blackstone	36	22	7	7	81	38	+43	51	
5	Thrapston Venturas	36	21	7	8	70	42	+28	49	
6	St Ives Town	36	21	5	10	66	50	+16	47	
7	Wellingborough Whitworth	36	18	7	11	67	59	+8	43	
8	Cottingham	36	16	8	12	60	49	+11	40	
9	Higham Town	36	14	8	14	59	65	−6	36	
10	Newport Pagnell Town	36	15	6	15	44	52	−8	36	
11	British Timken Athletic	36	14	4	18	51	60	−9	32	
12	Towcester Town	36	12	6	18	56	83	−27	30	
13	Irchester Eastfield	36	12	4	20	49	60	−11	28	
14	Burton Park Wanderers	36	11	5	20	43	59	−16	27	
15	Olney Town	36	7	11	18	43	68	−25	25	
16	British Timken Duston	36	9	7	20	53	79	−26	25	
17	Northampton ON Chenecks	36	8	9	19	40	75	−35	25	
18	Ford Sports Daventry	36	6	4	26	32	87	−55	16	
19	Sharnbrook	36	2	5	29	24	108	−84	9	

Source: fchd
Rules for classification: 1) points; 2) goal difference; 3) number of goals scored.
