= Les Lawrence =

English footballer (born 1957)

Personal information
- Full name: Leslie Oliver Lawrence
- Date of birth: 18 May 1957 (age 69)
- Place of birth: Wolverhampton, England
- Height: 6 ft 0 in (1.83 m)
- Position: Forward

Youth career
- Stourbridge

Senior career*
Years	Team	Apps	(Gls)
1975–1977	Shrewsbury Town	14	(2)
1977	Telford United		
1977–1982	Torquay United	189	(46)
1982–1983	Port Vale	8	(0)
1983–1984	Aldershot	39	(23)
1984–1985	Rochdale	15	(4)
1985–1986	Burnley	31	(8)
1986–1988	Peterborough United	33	(8)
1988	Cambridge United	13	(0)
1988	Kettering Town		
1988–1989	Aylesbury United	24	(3)
1990–1991	Bourne Town	18	(16)
1992–1994	Bourne Town	53	(29)
Total		437	(71)
- * Club domestic league appearances and goals

Leslie Oliver Lawrence (born 18 May 1957) is an English former footballer who played as a forward. He scored 105 goals in 395 league and cup games during a twelve-year career in the Football League, most of which was spent in the Fourth Division.

Lawrence began his career at Stourbridge before joining Shrewsbury Town in 1970. Two years later, he joined Torquay United via Telford United. After 54 goals in 215 league and cup games for Torquay, he signed with Port Vale in July 1982. He played eight games of their promotion winning campaign before transferring to Aldershot in July 1983. Leaving the "Shots" in 1984, he then spent a season each at Fourth Division sides Rochdale, Burnley, Peterborough United, and Cambridge United, before moving into non-League football with Kettering Town, Aylesbury United and Bourne Town.

== Early life ==
Leslie Oliver Lawrence was born in Wolverhampton on 18 May 1957 to a Jamaican immigrant.

== Career ==
=== Early career ===
Lawrence played for Southern League side Stourbridge before joining Shrewsbury Town of the Third Division. He made his debut at Gay Meadow against Swindon Town on 6 September 1975, becoming the first black player to represent Shrewsbury Town. He played 19 league games in 1975–76 and 1976–77, as the "Shrews" lifted the Welsh Cup in 1977 under Alan Durban's stewardship.

=== Torquay United ===
He then signed with Mike Green's Fourth Division club Torquay United via non-League Telford United for the 1977–78 campaign. He became the club's top scorer during the 1978–79 season with 19 goals. After finishing ninth in 1979–80, Torquay dropped to 17th in 1980–81. He played 215 games in all competitions, scoring 54 goals.

=== Port Vale ===
Lawrence joined John McGrath's Port Vale in July 1982. He made his debut as a substitute in a League Cup round one match against Rochdale on 30 August 1982. He made his full debut in a 2–0 home win over Hereford United on 9 October 1982 but failed to establish himself in the first-team and made just eight appearances in the 1982–83 Fourth Division promotion winning campaign.

=== Later career ===
He went on a free transfer in July 1983. He moved on to Aldershot. With 22 goals in 39 league games, he helped Len Walker's "Shots" to a fifth-place finish in the Fourth Division in 1983–84, though they were seven points short of Bristol City in the promotion zone. He spent 1984–85 with Vic Halom's Rochdale, scoring four times in 15 league games. He was signed to Burnley for a £20,000 fee in November 1984. He became the first black player to represent Burnley when he debuted against Bradford City at Turf Moor on 24 November 1984. He played 31 league games in 1985–86, scoring eight goals. Lawrence then signed with Peterborough United and scored eight goals in 33 league games in 1986–87 under John Wile and Noel Cantwell. In January 1988, he moved to his seventh different Fourth Division club after putting pen to paper with Chris Turner's Cambridge United. After 13 goalless league games in 1987–88 he departed the Abbey Stadium for Conference club Kettering Town. He later played for Aylesbury United and Bourne Town before retiring.

== Career statistics ==
Appearances and goals by club, season and competition
Club	Season	League			FA Cup		Other		Total	
Club	Season	Division	Apps	Goals	Apps	Goals	Apps	Goals	Apps	Goals
Shrewsbury Town	1975–76	Third Division	5	0	0	0	0	0	5	0
Shrewsbury Town	1976–77	Third Division	9	2	1	0	0	0	10	2
Shrewsbury Town	Total		14	2	1	0	0	0	15	2
Torquay United	1977–78	Fourth Division	34	5	1	0	3	1	38	6
Torquay United	1978–79	Fourth Division	45	17	3	1	2	1	50	19
Torquay United	1979–80	Fourth Division	42	14	3	1	4	2	49	17
Torquay United	1980–81	Fourth Division	26	5	1	1	2	0	29	6
Torquay United	1981–82	Fourth Division	42	5	2	1	5	0	49	6
Torquay United	Total		189	46	10	4	16	4	215	54
Port Vale	1982–83	Fourth Division	8	0	0	0	1	0	9	0
Aldershot	1983–84	Fourth Division	39	23	2	0	5	2	46	25
Rochdale	1984–85	Fourth Division	15	4	1	0	2	1	18	5
Burnley	1984–85	Third Division	10	2	0	0	2	0	12	2
Burnley	1985–86	Fourth Division	21	6	0	0	2	1	23	7
Burnley	Total		31	8	0	0	4	1	35	9
Peterborough United	1986–87	Fourth Division	12	4	1	0	3	0	16	4
Peterborough United	1987–88	Fourth Division	21	4	2	1	5	1	28	6
Peterborough United	Total		33	8	3	1	8	1	44	10
Cambridge United	1987–88	Fourth Division	13	0	0	0	0	0	13	0
Aylesbury United	1988–89	Conference	19	1	3	1	0	0	22	2
Aylesbury United	1989–90	Isthmian League Premier Division	5	2	1	0	0	0	6	2
Aylesbury United	Total		24	3	4	1	0	0	28	4
Bourne Town	1990–91	United Counties League; Premier Division	18	16	0	0	0	0	18	16
Bourne Town	1992–93	United Counties League; Premier Division	38	27	0	0	0	0	38	27
Bourne Town	1993–94	United Counties League; Premier Division	15	2	0	0	0	0	15	2
Bourne Town	Total		71	45	0	0	0	0	71	45
Career total			437	139	21	6	36	9	494	154

== Honours ==
Shrewsbury Town

- Welsh Cup: 1977

Port Vale

- Football League Fourth Division third-place promotion: 1982–83
