= 1984–85 Burnley F.C. season =

English football club season

Burnley
1984–85 season
- Chairman: John Jackson
- Manager: John Benson
- Division Three: 21st (relegated)
- League Cup: 2nd Round
- FA Cup: 3rd Round
- Football League Trophy: Northern Quarter Final
- Top goalscorer: League: Wayne Biggins (18); All: Kevin Hird (22)
- Highest home attendance: 12,690 v Manchester United (9 October 1984)
- Lowest home attendance: 1,432 v Stockport County (29 January 1985)
- Average home league attendance: 4,177

The 1984–85 season was Burnley's second season in the third tier of English football. They were managed by John Benson in his only season in charge of the club.

== Appearances and goals ==
No.	Pos	Nat	Player	Total		Division Three		League Cup		FA Cup		FL Trophy	
No.	Pos	Nat	Player	Apps	Goals	Apps	Goals	Apps	Goals	Apps	Goals	Apps	Goals
	FW	(England) ENG	Wayne Biggins	56	21	46+0	18	4+0	0	3+0	1	3+0	2
	DF	(England) ENG	Tony Chilton	1	0	1+0	0	0+0	0	0+0	0	0+0	0
	MF	(England) ENG	Peter Devine	25	6	15+4	2	0+0	0	2+0	2	3+1	2
	MF	(Wales) WAL	Brian Flynn	11	1	5+4	1	1+1	0	0+0	0	0+0	0
	DF	(England) ENG	Joe Gallagher	7	0	4+1	0	0+0	0	0+0	0	2+0	0
	MF	(England) ENG	Neil Grewcock	57	9	44+2	6	4+0	2	3+0	1	4+0	0
	DF	(England) ENG	Peter Hampton	54	1	44+1	1	4+0	0	3+0	0	2+0	0
	GK	(England) ENG	Roger Hansbury	46	0	37+0	0	4+0	0	3+0	0	2+0	0
	MF	(England) ENG	Kevin Hird	55	22	44+0	16	4+0	1	3+0	4	4+0	1
	MF	(Scotland) SCO	Tommy Hutchison	57	1	46+0	0	4+0	0	3+0	0	4+0	1
	DF	(England) ENG	Steve Kennedy	11	0	8+0	0	0+0	0	1+1	0	1+0	0
	FW	(England) ENG	Les Lawrence	12	2	6+4	2	0+0	0	0+0	0	0+2	0
	MF	(England) ENG	Phil Malley	12	0	8+1	0	0+0	0	0+0	0	2+1	0
	DF	(England) ENG	Dave Miller	17	1	12+2	1	2+0	0	1+0	0	0+0	0
	GK	(England) ENG	Joe Neenan	11	0	9+0	0	0+0	0	0+0	0	2+0	0
	DF	(England) ENG	Vince Overson	53	2	42+0	1	4+0	1	3+0	0	4+0	0
	DF	(England) ENG	Geoff Palmer	29	0	23+0	0	0+0	0	2+0	0	4+0	0
	MF	(England) ENG	Mike Phelan	54	3	43+0	1	4+0	0	3+0	0	4+0	2
	MF	(England) ENG	Barry Powell	15	2	9+2	0	2+0	0	2+0	2	0+0	0
	MF	(England) ENG	Mark Rhodes	10	0	9+0	0	0+0	0	0+0	0	1+0	0
	DF	(England) ENG	Derek Scott	32	1	27+1	1	3+0	0	0+0	0	1+0	0
	FW	(England) ENG	Alan Taylor	24	11	16+3	7	3+0	0	1+0	3	1+0	1
	FW	(England) ENG	Neil Whatmore	9	1	8+0	1	1+0	0	0+0	0	0+0	0

== Matches ==
=== Football League Division Three ===
Key

- In Result column, Burnley's score shown first
- H = Home match
- A = Away match
- pen. = Penalty kick
- o.g. = Own goal

Results

Date	Opponents	Result	Goalscorers	Attendance
25 August 1984	Plymouth Argyle (H)	1–1	Taylor 82'	4,644
31 August 1984	Doncaster Rovers (A)	0–2		3,368
8 September 1984	Bristol Rovers (H)	0–0		4,573
15 September 1984	Derby County (A)	2–2	Biggins 38', Hird 76'	11,755
18 September 1984	Orient (A)	2–0	Foster 48' (o.g.), Taylor 75'	2,359
22 September 1984	Hull City (H)	1–1	Biggins 61'	5,526
29 September 1984	Rotherham United (A)	2–3	Biggins (2) 44', 80'	4,646
2 October 1984	Newport County (H)	2–0	Flynn 47', Grewcock 72'	3,666
6 October 1984	Bournemouth (A)	1–1	Hird 22'	3,180
13 October 1984	Lincoln City (H)	1–2	Hird 31' (pen.)	4,315
20 October 1984	Reading (A)	1–5	Biggins 16'	4,024
23 October 1984	Brentford (H)	3–1	Hird 15' (pen.), Biggins 42', Roberts 65' (o.g.)	2,916
27 October 1984	Bolton Wanderers (H)	3–2	Hird 1', Grewcock 33', Miller 75'	6,501
3 November 1984	Preston North End (A)	3–3	Biggins (2) 11', 20', Whatmore 61'	4,995
6 November 1984	Gillingham (H)	0–1		3,595
10 November 1984	Cambridge United (A)	3–2	Biggins 47', Grewcock 78', Hird 85'	2,505
24 November 1984	Bradford City (H)	1–2	Biggins 39'	7,060
1 December 1984	Millwall (A)	1–2	Hird 68'	5,376
15 December 1984	Swansea City (H)	1–1	Lawrence 65'	3,798
22 December 1984	Walsall (H)	1–2	Hird 5'	3,350
26 December 1984	York City (A)	0–4		6,397
29 December 1984	Bristol City (A)	0–1		8,282
1 January 1985	Wigan Athletic (H)	1–2	Biggins 68'	5,235
2 February 1985	Rotherham United (H)	7–0	Devine 38', Hird (3) 40', 55' (pen.), 63', Biggins (2) 50', 81', Lawrence 90'	3,907
9 February 1985	Hull City (A)	0–2		6,478
16 February 1985	Orient (H)	1–1	Hird 45'	3,744
23 February 1985	Preston North End (H)	2–0	Scott 47', Biggins 48'	4,768
2 March 1985	Bolton Wanderers (A)	3–1	Devine 1', Grewcock 15', Hampton 80'	6,468
5 March 1985	Brentford (A)	1–2	Hird 73'	3,267
9 March 1985	Reading (H)	0–2		3,955
12 March 1985	Doncaster Rovers (H)	0–1		3,020
16 March 1985	Lincoln City (A)	1–3	Hird 22'	2,137
23 March 1985	Bournemouth (H)	1–1	Biggins 74'	2,784
26 March 1985	Plymouth Argyle (A)	2–2	Biggins 24', Hird 77' (pen.)	3,165
29 March 1985	Gillingham (A)	1–1	Biggins 49'	5,935
2 April 1985	Newport County (A)	1–2	Grewcock 59'	1,689
6 April 1985	York City (H)	1–1	Phelan 53'	3,844
8 April 1985	Wigan Athletic (A)	0–2		3,517
13 April 1985	Cambridge United (H)	2–0	Taylor (2) 2', 53'	2,843
16 April 1985	Bristol Rovers (A)	0–4		4,866
20 April 1985	Bradford City (A)	2–3	Grewcock 82', Biggins 85'	8,156
23 April 1985	Derby County (H)	0–1		3,873
27 April 1985	Millwall (H)	1–1	Overson 1'	3,586
4 May 1985	Swansea City (A)	1–0	Taylor 36'	5,221
6 May 1985	Bristol City (H)	0–1		4,570
11 May 1985	Walsall (A)	3–2	Taylor (2) 14', 56', Hird 51'	3,396

=== Final league position ===
Pos	Team	Pld	W	D	L	GF	GA	GD	Pts	Promotion or relegation
19	Lincoln City	46	11	18	17	50	51	−1	51 (Note: Bradford City v. Lincoln City was abandoned after 40 mins; the result (0–0) stood.)	
20	Swansea City	46	12	11	23	53	80	−27	47	
21	Burnley (R)	46	11	13	22	60	73	−13	46	Relegation to the Fourth Division
22	Orient (R)	46	11	13	22	51	76	−25	46	Relegation to the Fourth Division
23	Preston North End (R)	46	13	7	26	51	100	−49	46	Relegation to the Fourth Division

(R) Relegated

=== FA Cup ===
Date	Round	Opponents	Result	Goalscorers	Attendance
17 November 1984	Round 1	Penrith (A)	9–0	Hird (3) 7' (pen.), 44', 48', Taylor (3) 53', 62', 85', Grewcock 71', Powell (2) 78', 88'	1,813
8 December 1984	Round 2	Halifax Town (H)	3–1	Hird 27', Devine 60', Biggins 80'	5,543
5 January 1985	Round 3	Wimbledon (A)	1–3	Devine 89'	3,381

=== League Cup ===
Date	Round	Opponents	Result	Goalscorers	Attendance
23 August 1984	Round 1 First leg	Crewe Alexandra (H)	1–2	Grewcock 27'	3,043
4 September 1984	Round 1 Second leg	Crewe Alexandra (A)	3–0	Overson 52', Hird 65', Grewcock 80'	3,067
26 September 1984	Round 2 First leg	Manchester United (A)	0–4		28,383
9 October 1984	Round 2 Second leg	Manchester United (H)	0–3		12,690

=== Football League Trophy ===
Date	Round	Opponents	Result	Goalscorers	Attendance
29 January 1985	Round 1 First Leg	Stockport County (H)	5–1	Biggins (2) 22', 28', Devine 31', Phelan 58', Hutchison 72'	1,432
4 February 1985	Round 1 Second Leg	Stockport County (A)	1–0	Hird 61'	1,568
19 March 1985	Round 2	Tranmere Rovers (A)	2–2 (a.e.t.) (4 – 5p)	Devine 85', Phelan 103'	1,325
10 April 1985	Northern Quarter Final	Mansfield Town (A)	1–1 (a.e.t.) (3 – 5p)	Taylor 29'	2,540
