= 1991–92 United Counties League =

The 1991–92 United Counties League season was the 85th in the history of the United Counties League, a football competition in England.

== Premier Division ==
United Counties League Premier Division
- Season: 1991–92
- Champions: Northampton Spencer
- Matches: 552
- Goals: 1,765 (3.2 per match)

The Premier Division featured 21 clubs which competed in the division last season, along with three new clubs:

- Boston, joined from the Central Midlands League
- Daventry Town, promoted from Division One
- Spalding United, relegated from the Southern Football League

Also, Baker Perkins changed name to APV Peterborough City.

=== League table ===
| Pos | Team | Pld | W | D | L | GF | GA | GD | Pts | Promotion or relegation |
|---|---|---|---|---|---|---|---|---|---|---|
| 1 | Northampton Spencer | 46 | 31 | 8 | 7 | 101 | 44 | +57 | 101 | |
| 2 | Raunds Town | 46 | 27 | 14 | 5 | 94 | 38 | +56 | 95 | |
| 3 | Rothwell Town | 46 | 29 | 6 | 11 | 100 | 51 | +49 | 93 | |
| 4 | Bourne Town | 46 | 27 | 8 | 11 | 113 | 57 | +56 | 89 | |
| 5 | Stotfold | 46 | 26 | 8 | 12 | 93 | 52 | +41 | 86 | |
| 6 | Mirrlees Blackstone | 46 | 23 | 12 | 11 | 77 | 60 | +17 | 81 | |
| 7 | Eynesbury Rovers | 46 | 22 | 12 | 12 | 82 | 58 | +24 | 78 | |
| 8 | Boston | 46 | 21 | 11 | 14 | 79 | 62 | +17 | 74 | |
| 9 | Hamlet Stewart & Lloyds | 46 | 21 | 11 | 14 | 76 | 60 | +16 | 74 | |
| 10 | Arlesey Town | 46 | 20 | 12 | 14 | 76 | 65 | +11 | 72 | Transferred to the South Midlands League Premier Division |
| 11 | APV Peterborough City | 46 | 22 | 5 | 19 | 81 | 66 | +15 | 71 | Demoted to Division One |
| 12 | Cogenhoe United | 46 | 19 | 13 | 14 | 92 | 63 | +29 | 70 | |
| 13 | Potton United | 46 | 20 | 9 | 17 | 76 | 61 | +15 | 69 | |
| 14 | Daventry Town | 46 | 18 | 10 | 18 | 71 | 65 | +6 | 64 | |
| 15 | Kempston Rovers | 46 | 16 | 15 | 15 | 54 | 51 | +3 | 63 | |
| 16 | Long Buckby | 46 | 18 | 9 | 19 | 66 | 67 | −1 | 63 | |
| 17 | Irthlingborough Diamonds | 46 | 17 | 8 | 21 | 73 | 88 | −15 | 59 | Merged into Rushden & Diamonds |
| 18 | Desborough Town | 46 | 13 | 10 | 23 | 57 | 85 | −28 | 49 | |
| 19 | Wootton Blue Cross | 46 | 15 | 3 | 28 | 57 | 85 | −28 | 48 | |
| 20 | Stamford | 46 | 11 | 8 | 27 | 60 | 85 | −25 | 41 | |
| 21 | Spalding United | 46 | 10 | 11 | 25 | 59 | 104 | −45 | 41 | |
| 22 | Wellingborough Town | 46 | 7 | 5 | 34 | 45 | 130 | −85 | 26 | |
| 23 | Holbeach United | 46 | 4 | 9 | 33 | 44 | 133 | −89 | 21 | |
| 24 | Brackley Town | 46 | 3 | 7 | 36 | 39 | 135 | −96 | 16 | |

Source: fchd
Rules for classification: 1) points; 2) goal difference; 3) number of goals scored.

== Division One ==
United Counties League Division One
- Season: 1991–92
- Champions: Harrowby United
- Promoted: Newport Pagnell Town
- Matches: 306
- Goals: 1,116 (3.65 per match)

Division One featured 17 clubs which competed in the division last season, along with one new club:

- Burton Park Wanderers, relegated from the Premier Division

Also, British Timken Duston changed name to British Timken.

=== League table ===
| Pos | Team | Pld | W | D | L | GF | GA | GD | Pts | Promotion |
|---|---|---|---|---|---|---|---|---|---|---|
| 1 | Harrowby United | 34 | 25 | 5 | 4 | 92 | 30 | +62 | 80 | |
| 2 | Newport Pagnell Town | 34 | 25 | 5 | 4 | 86 | 44 | +42 | 80 | Promoted to the Premier Division |
| 3 | Ramsey Town | 34 | 23 | 6 | 5 | 95 | 36 | +59 | 75 | |
| 4 | St Ives Town | 34 | 22 | 6 | 6 | 78 | 32 | +46 | 72 | |
| 5 | Bugbrooke St Michaels | 34 | 21 | 5 | 8 | 78 | 42 | +36 | 68 | |
| 6 | Higham Town | 34 | 19 | 7 | 8 | 73 | 45 | +28 | 64 | |
| 7 | Ford Sports Daventry | 34 | 18 | 6 | 10 | 74 | 48 | +26 | 60 | |
| 8 | Northampton ON Chenecks | 34 | 16 | 9 | 9 | 61 | 47 | +14 | 57 | |
| 9 | Cottingham | 34 | 14 | 4 | 16 | 62 | 68 | −6 | 46 | |
| 10 | Thrapston Venturas | 34 | 11 | 6 | 17 | 54 | 70 | −16 | 39 | |
| 11 | Blisworth | 34 | 11 | 4 | 19 | 50 | 65 | −15 | 37 | |
| 12 | Olney Town | 34 | 10 | 6 | 18 | 53 | 61 | −8 | 36 | |
| 13 | Wellingborough Whitworth | 34 | 10 | 6 | 18 | 41 | 70 | −29 | 36 | |
| 14 | British Timken | 34 | 9 | 4 | 21 | 65 | 107 | −42 | 31 | |
| 15 | Sharnbrook | 34 | 8 | 5 | 21 | 51 | 77 | −26 | 29 | |
| 16 | Burton Park Wanderers | 34 | 6 | 10 | 18 | 38 | 58 | −20 | 28 | |
| 17 | Towcester Town | 34 | 6 | 6 | 22 | 38 | 72 | −34 | 24 | |
| 18 | Irchester United | 34 | 1 | 2 | 31 | 27 | 144 | −117 | 5 | |

Source: fchd
Rules for classification: 1) points; 2) goal difference; 3) number of goals scored.
