= 1988–89 United Counties League =

The 1988–89 United Counties League season was the 82nd in the history of the United Counties League, a football competition in England.

== Premier Division ==
United Counties League Premier Division
- Season: 1988–89
- Champions: Potton United
- Matches: 380
- Goals: 1,090 (2.87 per match)

The Premier Division featured 19 clubs which competed in the division last season, along with one new club:

- Mirrlees Blackstone, promoted from Division One

=== League table ===
Pos	Team	Pld	W	D	L	GF	GA	GD	Pts
1	Potton United	38	24	6	8	70	37	+33	78
2	Brackley Town	38	20	8	10	71	33	+38	68
3	Holbeach United	38	18	10	10	70	46	+24	64
4	Irthlingborough Diamonds	38	17	13	8	56	37	+19	64
5	Rothwell Town	38	18	8	12	63	55	+8	62
6	Raunds Town	38	18	8	12	54	47	+7	62
7	Stamford	38	17	10	11	55	51	+4	61
8	Wootton Blue Cross	38	17	8	13	50	46	+4	59
9	Long Buckby	38	15	8	15	60	55	+5	53
10	Stotfold	38	14	10	14	59	55	+4	52
11	Desborough Town	38	13	10	15	58	65	−7	49
12	Eynesbury Rovers	38	12	12	14	47	44	+3	48
13	Northampton Spencer	38	13	8	17	56	55	+1	47
14	Arlesey Town	38	14	5	19	40	66	−26	47
15	Stewart & Lloyds Corby	38	12	8	18	57	68	−11	44
16	Cogenhoe United	38	12	8	18	53	71	−18	44
17	Baker Perkins	38	10	11	17	43	62	−19	41
18	Mirrlees Blackstone	38	10	8	20	43	58	−15	38
19	Kempston Rovers	38	8	11	19	46	67	−21	35
20	Bourne Town	38	8	10	20	39	72	−33	34

Source: fchd
Rules for classification: 1) points; 2) goal difference; 3) number of goals scored.

== Division One ==
United Counties League Division One
- Season: 1988–89
- Champions: Ramsey Town
- Promoted: Burton Park Wanderers
- Matches: 342
- Goals: 1,083 (3.17 per match)

Division One featured 19 clubs which competed in the division last season, no new clubs joined the division this season.

=== League table ===
Pos	Team	Pld	W	D	L	GF	GA	GD	Pts	Promotion
1	Ramsey Town	36	28	4	4	103	37	+66	88	
2	Burton Park Wanderers	36	22	10	4	65	27	+38	76	Promoted to the Premier Division
3	Sharnbrook	36	23	6	7	78	37	+41	75	
4	Blisworth	36	17	11	8	75	46	+29	62	
5	Cottingham	36	18	8	10	65	39	+26	62	
6	Newport Pagnell Town	36	18	6	12	55	35	+20	60	
7	St Ives Town	36	16	11	9	62	44	+18	59	
8	Thrapston Venturas	36	16	8	12	69	51	+18	56	
9	Higham Town	36	15	9	12	43	41	+2	54	
10	Bugbrooke St Michaels	36	11	12	13	52	50	+2	45	
11	Towcester Town	36	12	8	16	49	68	−19	44	
12	British Timken Duston	36	12	7	17	58	50	+8	43	
13	Ampthill Town	36	11	10	15	48	69	−21	43	
14	Wellingborough Whitworth	36	12	6	18	57	77	−20	42	
15	Irchester Eastfield	36	9	10	17	53	61	−8	37	
16	Northampton ON Chenecks	36	7	10	19	32	70	−38	31	
17	Olney Town	36	7	5	24	47	82	−35	26	
18	Ford Sports Daventry	36	7	5	24	39	106	−67	26	
19	British Timken Athletic	36	4	8	24	33	93	−60	20	

Source: fchd
Rules for classification: 1) points; 2) goal difference; 3) number of goals scored.
