= 1989–90 United Counties League =

The 1989–90 United Counties League season was the 83rd in the history of the United Counties League, a football competition in England.

== Premier Division ==
United Counties League Premier Division
- Season: 1989–90
- Champions: Bourne Town
- Matches: 462
- Goals: 1,286 (2.78 per match)

The Premier Division featured 20 clubs which competed in the division last season, along with two new clubs:

- Burton Park Wanderers, promoted from Division One
- Wellingborough Town, relegated from the Southern Football League

Also, Stewart & Lloyds Corby changed name to Hamlet Stewart & Lloyds.

=== League table ===
Pos	Team	Pld	W	D	L	GF	GA	GD	Pts
1	Holbeach United	42	29	5	8	94	46	+48	92
2	Rothwell Town	42	27	8	7	72	38	+34	89
3	Raunds Town	42	20	10	12	67	42	+25	70
4	Bourne Town	42	19	13	10	71	47	+24	70
5	Cogenhoe United	42	20	10	12	57	46	+11	70
6	Stotfold	42	19	9	14	66	52	+14	66
7	Northampton Spencer	42	19	9	14	63	51	+12	66
8	Mirrlees Blackstone	42	18	12	12	73	63	+10	66
9	Arlesey Town	42	17	10	15	55	60	−5	61
10	Long Buckby	42	16	9	17	58	61	−3	57
11	Hamlet Stewart & Lloyds	42	12	17	13	46	42	+4	53
12	Irthlingborough Diamonds	42	14	10	18	64	66	−2	52
13	Baker Perkins	42	14	9	19	50	63	−13	51
14	Potton United	42	12	14	16	54	48	+6	50
15	Stamford	42	13	11	18	55	63	−8	50
16	Desborough Town	42	13	11	18	65	77	−12	50
17	Burton Park Wanderers	42	12	12	18	48	67	−19	48
18	Wootton Blue Cross	42	12	11	19	52	71	−19	47
19	Wellingborough Town	42	13	7	22	59	70	−11	46
20	Brackley Town	42	12	10	20	46	67	−21	46
21	Eynesbury Rovers	42	8	14	20	30	68	−38	38
22	Kempston Rovers	42	8	9	25	41	78	−37	33

Source: fchd
Rules for classification: 1) points; 2) goal difference; 3) number of goals scored.

== Division One ==
United Counties League Division One
- Season: 1989–90
- Champions: Daventry Town
- Matches: 342
- Goals: 1,165 (3.41 per match)

Division One featured 18 clubs which competed in the division last season, along with one new club:

- Daventry Town, joined from the Northamptonshire Combination League

=== League table ===
Pos	Team	Pld	W	D	L	GF	GA	GD	Pts	Promotion
1	Daventry Town	36	26	3	7	102	43	+59	81	
2	Higham Town	36	24	8	4	85	37	+48	80	
3	Ramsey Town	36	22	6	8	91	33	+58	72	
4	St Ives Town	36	20	9	7	74	40	+34	69	
5	Bugbrooke St Michaels	36	20	7	9	71	43	+28	67	
6	Newport Pagnell Town	36	15	16	5	65	36	+29	61	
7	Sharnbrook	36	17	8	11	65	61	+4	59	
8	Thrapston Venturas	36	15	10	11	70	52	+18	55	
9	Olney Town	36	15	10	11	58	47	+11	55	
10	Ampthill Town	36	15	10	11	56	53	+3	55	
11	British Timken Athletic	36	14	7	15	76	71	+5	49	Resigned from the league
12	Cottingham	36	11	10	15	56	58	−2	43	
13	Irchester Eastfield	36	12	7	17	52	71	−19	43	
14	Blisworth	36	8	9	19	45	64	−19	33	
15	Northampton ON Chenecks	36	9	5	22	39	52	−13	32	
16	Wellingborough Whitworth	36	8	7	21	46	91	−45	31	
17	British Timken Duston	36	8	5	23	34	87	−53	29	
18	Ford Sports Daventry	36	5	6	25	33	110	−77	21	
19	Towcester Town	36	4	5	27	47	116	−69	17	

Source: fchd
Rules for classification: 1) points; 2) goal difference; 3) number of goals scored.
