= 1993–94 United Counties League =

The 1993–94 United Counties League season was the 87th in the history of the United Counties League, a football competition in England.

== Premier Division ==
United Counties League Premier Division
- Season: 1993–94
- Champions: Rothwell Town
- Promoted: Rothwell Town
- Matches: 462
- Goals: 1,683 (3.64 per match)

The Premier Division featured 22 clubs which competed in the division last season, no new clubs joined the division this season.

=== League table ===
Pos	Team	Pld	W	D	L	GF	GA	GD	Pts	Promotion or relegation
1	Rothwell Town	42	34	3	5	114	38	+76	105	Promoted to the Southern Football League
2	Stotfold	42	31	5	6	114	48	+66	98	
3	Northampton Spencer	42	26	8	8	99	55	+44	86	
4	Cogenhoe United	42	25	6	11	93	55	+38	81	
5	Raunds Town	42	24	8	10	93	55	+38	80	
6	Mirrlees Blackstone	42	21	8	13	83	60	+23	71	
7	Long Buckby	42	19	13	10	83	56	+27	70	
8	Boston	42	21	6	15	89	56	+33	69	
9	Eynesbury Rovers	42	18	13	11	104	63	+41	67	
10	Holbeach United	42	18	8	16	80	81	−1	62	
11	Stewarts & Lloyds Corby	42	18	7	17	67	80	−13	61	
12	Potton United	42	16	9	17	74	65	+9	57	
13	Bourne Town	42	16	9	17	87	81	+6	57	
14	Spalding United	42	15	10	17	71	68	+3	55	
15	Newport Pagnell Town	42	14	11	17	52	64	−12	53	
16	Wellingborough Town	42	10	11	21	62	95	−33	41	
17	Desborough Town	42	12	5	25	70	105	−35	41	
18	Wootton Blue Cross	42	11	7	24	65	86	−21	40	
19	Stamford	42	11	6	25	56	80	−24	39	
20	Daventry Town	42	10	5	27	47	95	−48	35	Demoted to Division One
21	Kempston Rovers	42	4	10	28	39	81	−42	22	
22	Brackley Town	42	2	4	36	41	216	−175	10	Transferred to the Hellenic League

Source: fchd
Rules for classification: 1) points; 2) goal difference; 3) number of goals scored.

== Division One ==
United Counties League Division One
- Season: 1993–94
- Champions: Northampton Vanaid
- Matches: 272
- Goals: 1,048 (3.85 per match)

Division One featured 16 clubs which competed in the division last season, along with one new club:

- Northampton Vanaid, joined from the Northampton Town League

=== League table ===
Pos	Team	Pld	W	D	L	GF	GA	GD	Pts
1	Northampton Vanaid	32	22	7	3	109	32	+77	73
2	Higham Town	32	20	6	6	89	25	+64	66
3	Olney Town	32	19	5	8	81	28	+53	62
4	Northampton ON Chenecks	32	18	6	8	67	32	+35	60
5	St Ives Town	32	16	10	6	55	32	+23	58
6	Wellingborough Whitworth	32	16	5	11	72	59	+13	53
7	Ramsey Town	32	15	4	13	66	56	+10	49
8	Blisworth	32	14	4	14	57	69	−12	46
9	Bugbrooke St Michaels	32	13	4	15	66	65	+1	43
10	Cottingham	32	12	4	16	54	67	−13	40
11	Burton Park Wanderers	32	11	6	15	57	65	−8	39
12	British Timken	32	11	5	16	40	57	−17	38
13	Thrapston Venturas	32	11	4	17	56	62	−6	37
14	Sharnbrook	32	11	3	18	54	91	−37	36
15	Irchester United	32	9	5	18	42	77	−35	32
16	Ford Sports Daventry	32	10	1	21	53	90	−37	31
17	Harrowby United	32	2	5	25	30	141	−111	11

Source: fchd
Rules for classification: 1) points; 2) goal difference; 3) number of goals scored.
