= Peter Devine =

Peter Devine may refer to:

- Peter Devine (footballer) (born 1960), English footballer
- Peter Devine (fencer) (born 1976), American fencer
