= 1992–93 United Counties League =

The 1992–93 United Counties League season was the 86th in the history of the United Counties League, a football competition in England.

== Premier Division ==
United Counties League Premier Division
- Season: 1992–93
- Champions: Rothwell Town
- Matches: 462
- Goals: 1,705 (3.69 per match)

The Premier Division featured 21 clubs which competed in the division last season, along with one new club:

- Newport Pagnell Town, promoted from Division One

Also, Hamlet Stewart & Lloyds changed name to Stewarts & Lloyds Corby.

=== League table ===
Pos	Team	Pld	W	D	L	GF	GA	GD	Pts
1	Rothwell Town	42	30	8	4	97	28	+69	98
2	Northampton Spencer	42	29	6	7	96	37	+59	93
3	Raunds Town	42	28	6	8	93	41	+52	90
4	Potton United	42	26	7	9	107	56	+51	85
5	Daventry Town	42	24	7	11	91	60	+31	79
6	Cogenhoe United	42	23	9	10	101	56	+45	78
7	Stewarts & Lloyds Corby	42	24	6	12	97	62	+35	78
8	Bourne Town	42	22	6	14	94	59	+35	72
9	Eynesbury Rovers	42	22	6	14	92	71	+21	72
10	Long Buckby	42	19	6	17	91	65	+26	63
11	Boston	42	17	7	18	80	74	+6	58
12	Stamford	42	18	3	21	81	76	+5	57
13	Spalding United	42	17	4	21	66	70	−4	55
14	Newport Pagnell Town	42	15	9	18	65	79	−14	54
15	Kempston Rovers	42	14	11	17	60	60	0	53
16	Mirrlees Blackstone	42	14	8	20	69	82	−13	50
17	Stotfold	42	15	3	24	90	82	+8	48
18	Wootton Blue Cross	42	11	10	21	51	76	−25	43
19	Holbeach United	42	12	3	27	59	91	−32	39
20	Desborough Town	42	5	10	27	61	127	−66	25
21	Wellingborough Town	42	4	8	30	44	143	−99	20
22	Brackley Town	42	0	3	39	20	210	−190	3

Source: fchd
Rules for classification: 1) points; 2) goal difference; 3) number of goals scored.

== Division One ==
United Counties League Division One
- Season: 1992–93
- Champions: Ford Sports Daventry
- Matches: 306
- Goals: 1,232 (4.03 per match)

Division One featured 17 clubs which competed in the division last season, along with one new club:

- APV Peterborough City, demoted from the Premier Division, who also changed name to Peterborough City

=== League table ===
Pos	Team	Pld	W	D	L	GF	GA	GD	Pts	Promotion
1	Ford Sports Daventry	34	27	3	4	134	48	+86	84	
2	Higham Town	34	22	9	3	97	28	+69	75	
3	Bugbrooke St Michaels	34	21	4	9	78	43	+35	67	
4	Ramsey Town	34	18	10	6	76	49	+27	64	
5	Wellingborough Whitworth	34	14	8	12	68	49	+19	50	
6	Burton Park Wanderers	34	13	11	10	60	52	+8	50	
7	St Ives Town	34	13	9	12	72	52	+20	48	
8	Cottingham	34	13	9	12	70	64	+6	48	
9	Olney Town	34	12	11	11	61	38	+23	47	
10	Thrapston Venturas	34	12	9	13	61	70	−9	45	
11	Peterborough City	34	13	5	16	70	78	−8	44	Resigned from the league
12	Harrowby United	34	11	10	13	57	60	−3	43	
13	Northampton ON Chenecks	34	10	11	13	69	61	+8	41	
14	Blisworth	34	11	7	16	51	67	−16	40	
15	Sharnbrook	34	11	6	17	64	74	−10	39	
16	British Timken	34	9	9	16	68	100	−32	36	
17	Irchester United	34	6	6	22	58	95	−37	24	
18	Towcester Town	34	1	1	32	18	204	−186	4	Resigned from the league

Source: fchd
Rules for classification: 1) points; 2) goal difference; 3) number of goals scored.
