= Tommy Fogarty =

Northern Irish footballer (born 2004)

Personal information
- Full name: Tommy Patrick Fogarty
- Date of birth: 19 June 2004 (age 22)
- Place of birth: Northern Ireland
- Position: Defender

Team information
- Current team: Brackley Town (on loan from Tamworth)
- Number: 14

Youth career
- –2024: Birmingham City

Senior career*
Years	Team	Apps	(Gls)
2024–2026	Birmingham City	0	(0)
2024	→ Ebbsfleet United (loan)	8	(0)
2024–2025	→ Dunfermline Athletic (loan)	19	(0)
2025	→ Boston United (loan)	11	(0)
2026	→ Morecambe (loan)	5	(0)
2026–	Tamworth	0	(0)
2026–	→ Brackley Town (loan)	4	(0)

International career^{‡}
2023–	Northern Ireland U21	12	(0)
- * Club domestic league appearances and goals as of 18:00, 31 August 2026 (UTC) ‡ National team caps and goals as of 18:00, 31 August 2026 (UTC)

Tommy Patrick Fogarty (born 19 June 2004) is a Northern Irish professional footballer plays as a defender for National League North club Brackley Town on loan from National League club Tamworth. He is a Northern Ireland U21 international.

== Club career ==
=== Birmingham City ===
A full-back, he signed his first professional contract with Birmingham City as a 17 year-old. He signed a new three-year contract with Birmingham in 2023.

==== Ebbsfleet United (loan) ====
He played for Ebbsfleet United on a six-month loan deal from January 2024.

==== Dunfermline Athletic (loan) ====
In August 2024, he joined Scottish Championship side Dunfermline Athletic on a season-long loan.

==== Boston United (loan) ====
On 19 August 2025, Fogarty signed for National League side Boston United, on loan until January 2026. He made his debut the same evening, as Boston United lost at home 1–0 to FC Halifax Town.

Fogarty returned to Birmingham City on 6 January 2026. He made 11 appearances during his loan spell with Boston United.

==== Morecambe (loan) ====
Following the expiry of his loan spell at Boston United, Fogarty signed for fellow National League side Morecambe on 20 January 2026 for the remainder of the 2025–26 season.

=== Return to Birmingham City ===
Birmingham City announced their retained list on 15 May 2026, with Fogarty being released on the expiry of his contract.

=== Tamworth ===
On 26 June 2026 National League side Tamworth announced that Fogarty had signed for the club ahead of the 2026–27 season.

==== Brackley Town (loan) ====
Fogarty signed for National League North side Brackley Town on a months loan on 14 August 2026. Tommy made his debut for Brackley Town on 15 August 2026, playing the full match in a 1-1 draw at home to newly promoted Hebburn Town.

== International career ==
He represented both the Republic of Ireland and Northern Ireland at youth level. He is a Northern Ireland U21 international making his debut against Ukraine U21 in September 2023.

== Career statistics ==
As of match played 31 August 2026

Appearances and goals by club, season and competition
Club	Season	League			National cup (Note: Includes FA Cup, Scottish Cup)		League cup (Note: Includes EFL Cup, Scottish League Cup)		Other		Total	
Club	Season	Division	Apps	Goals	Apps	Goals	Apps	Goals	Apps	Goals	Apps	Goals
Birmingham City	2023–24	Championship	0	0	0	0	0	0	—		0	0
Birmingham City	2024–25	League One	0	0	0	0	0	0	0	0	0	0
Birmingham City	2025–26	Championship	0	0	0	0	0	0	—		0	0
Birmingham City	Total		0	0	0	0	0	0	0	0	0	0
Ebbsfleet United (loan)	2023–24	National League	8	0	0	0	—		0	0	8	0
Dunfermline Athletic (loan)	2024–25	Scottish Championship	19	0	1	0	0	0	0	0	15	0
Boston United (loan)	2025–26	National League	11	0	0	0	—		1 (Note: Appearance in FA Trophy)	0	12	0
Morecambe (loan)	2025–26	National League	5	0	0	0	—		0	0	5	0
Tamworth	2026–27	National League	0	0	0	0	—		0	0	0	0
Brackley Town (loan)	2026–27	National League North	4	0	0	0	—		0	0	4	0
Career total			42	0	1	0	0	0	1	0	44	0
