= Kevin Hird =

English footballer (born 1955)

Personal information
- Full name: Kevin Hird
- Date of birth: 11 February 1955 (age 71)
- Place of birth: Colne, England
- Height: 5 ft 7 in (1.70 m)
- Positions: Midfielder; right back

Senior career*
Years	Team	Apps	(Gls)
1973–1979	Blackburn Rovers	132	(20)
1979–1984	Leeds United	181	(19)
1984–1986	Burnley	83	(23)
1986–19??	Colne Dynamoes		
Total		396	(62)
- * Club domestic league appearances and goals

Kevin Hird (born 11 February 1955) is an English former footballer who played as a midfielder or right back. He played in the Football League for Blackburn Rovers, Leeds United and Burnley. He started his career as a midfielder before being converted into a right back.

== Early life ==
Hird was born in Colne on 11 February 1955, and grew up as a Burnley fan.

== Career ==
Hird developed through Blackburn Rovers's youth academy, joining as an apprentice in October 1970 and turning professional in February 1973. He made his first team debut for the club towards the end of the 1973–74 season. He was overlooked during the 1974–75 season as Blackburn were promoted from the Third Division as champions, but featured more frequently the following season. Having started his career as a right-sided midfielder, he was successfully converted into a right back during the 1976–77 season by manager Jim Smith.

Hird signed for First Division club Leeds United in March 1979 for a fee of £357,000, a record fee for both clubs and the highest fee paid for a full-back in British football at the time. At Leeds, he was again used both as a midfielder and as a right back, and was noted for his "eye-catching" dribbling skills. He was Leeds' top scorer for the 1979–80 season, albeit with just 8 goals, and held the responsibility of penalty-taker for three seasons. In total, he made 200 appearances for Leeds and scored 21 goals.

In summer 1984, Hird joined Third Division club Burnley. He scored 16 league goals in his first season at the club as they were relegated to the Fourth Division. He remained at the club for a further season before joining non-league Colne Dynamoes.

== Personal life ==
In January 2008, Hird was accused of police assault after allegedly slapping a female police officer across the face after urinating in the street. Hird admitted to the charge, and was conditionally discharged for six months and ordered to pay £60 costs.
