= Tony Chilton =

English footballer

Personal information
- Full name: Anthony Julian Thomas Chilton
- Date of birth: 7 September 1965 (age 61)
- Place of birth: Maryport, England
- Position: Defender

Senior career*
| Years | Team | Apps | (Gls) |
| 1983–1985 | Sunderland | 0 | (0) |
| 1985 | Burnley | 1 | (0) |
| 1985–1986 | Whitby Town | ? | (?) |
| 1986 | Hartlepool United | 3 | (0) |
| | Whitley Bay | ? | (?) |
| | Barrow | ? | (?) |
| | Workington | ? | (?) |
| | Gretna | ? | (?) |
| | Barrow | ? | (?) |
| | Newcastle Blue Star | ? | (?) |
| | Altrincham | ? | (?) |
| | Gateshead | ? | (?) |
| | Gretna | ? | (?) |
- * Club domestic league appearances and goals

Anthony Julian Thomas Chilton (born 7 September 1965) is an English former professional footballer who played as a defender.
