= Peter Devine (footballer) =

English footballer

Personal information
- Full name: Peter Devine
- Date of birth: 25 May 1960 (age 66)
- Place of birth: Blackburn, England
- Height: 5 ft 8 in (1.73 m)
- Position: Winger

Senior career*
Years	Team	Apps	(Gls)
- Vancouver Whitecaps
1981–1982	Bristol City	21	(1)
1982–1984	Blackburn Rovers	8	(2)
1984–1986	Burnley	56	(4)
1986–?	Lancaster City		
- Chorley
- Morecambe
- Clitheroe

Managerial career
- 2015: AFC Darwen
- * Club domestic league appearances and goals

Peter Devine (born 25 May 1960) is an English former professional footballer who played as a winger. Devine played professionally for Vancouver Whitecaps, Blackburn Rovers and Burnley and also played non-league football for Lancaster City, Chorley, Morecambe and Clitheroe.

While playing for Lancaster City, Devine became infamous for a missed penalty kick attempt during the 1991 HFS Northern Premier League Division One Cup Final against Whitley Bay. The miss has been voted one of the worst penalty misses of all time and was included on the football blunders videos Danny Baker's Own Goals and Gaffs [sic] and Nick Hancock's Football Nightmares. The miss was repeatedly mocked by Hancock throughout the video and while Devine politely declined to comment to The Athletic to discuss his gaffe, he insisted that he had no hard feelings towards him.

In July 2015, Devine took over as manager of AFC Darwen. After playing just one pre-season friendly, Devine resigned as manager.

He has previously worked as Community Development Officer at Wigan Athletic. He has also worked for a local plastics company, as well as previously being a PE teacher in Spain and owning an English bar in Benalmádena called Devine's.
