= Brackley Town F.C. =

Association football club in Brackley, England

Coordinates: 52°1′28.538″N 1°8′38.641″W

- Full name: Brackley Town Football Club
- Nickname: The Saints
- Founded: 1890
- Ground: St James Park
- Capacity: 3,500 (300 seated)
- Chairman: Matt Wise
- Manager: Gareth Dean
- League: National League North
- 2025–26: National League, 21st of 24 (relegated)
- Website: brackleytownfc.com
| Home colours | Away colours |

Brackley Town Football Club is a football club in Brackley, Northamptonshire, England. They are currently members of the National League North, the sixth tier of English football, and play at St James Park. The club won the FA Trophy in 2018.

== History ==
Established in 1890, the club spent much of the pre-World War I era in the Oxfordshire Senior League. After the war they switched to the North Bucks & District League, where they remained until transferring to the Banbury & District League. However, they rejoined the North Bucks League in 1974. In 1977 the club joined Division One of the Hellenic League. They won the league's Knock-Out Cup in 1982–83, after which they switched to Division One of the United Counties League in 1983. They went on to win the division at the first attempt, earning promotion to the Premier Division. Although they finished as runners-up in 1988–89, the following season saw them finish twentieth, and after finishing bottom of the division in three successive seasons between 1991–92 and 1993–94, the club rejoined the Hellenic League and were placed in the Premier Division.

Although Brackley finished third-from-bottom of the Premier Division in their first season, the 1995–96 season saw them end the season as runners-up. The following season the club were league champions, earning promotion to Division One Midlands of the Southern League. After one season they were transferred to Division One South, but were relegated back to the Hellenic League at the end of the 1998–99 season, which saw them finish bottom of the division. In 2003–04 Brackley won the Hellenic League for a second time, as well as the Supplementary Cup, and were promoted back to the Southern League, this time to Division One West. A third-place finish in 2005–06 saw them qualify for the promotion play-offs. However, after beating Marlow 2–1 in the semi-finals, they lost 3–2 to Hemel Hempstead Town in the final. The club were transferred to Division One Midlands for the following season, and went on to win the division, earning promotion to the Premier Division. In 2008–09 they reached the first round of the FA Cup for the first time, losing 2–1 at Eastwood Town. After finishing fifth in 2009–10 the club qualified for the promotion play-offs again, but lost 6–0 to Nuneaton Town in the semi-finals.

The 2011–12 season saw Brackley win the Premier Division, earning promotion to the Conference North. They finished third in their first season in the division. In the subsequent promotion play-offs, they beat Altrincham 4–2 on aggregate in the semi-finals before losing 1–0 to FC Halifax Town in the final. The following season the club reached the first round of the FA Cup again, and after drawing 1–1 against Gillingham at Priestfield, they won the replay 1–0. In the second round the club lost 3–2 at Macclesfield Town. Brackley reached the first round again in 2015–16, losing 4–1 to Newport County in a replay after a 2–2 draw in the first match. The 2016–17 FA Cup saw the club reach the second round after again beating Gillingham 4–3 in a first-round replay. In the next round they lost 1–0 at Blackpool.

In 2017–18 Brackley won the FA Trophy, beating Bromley 5–4 on penalties in the final after the game had ended 1–1. They also finished third in the National League North and reached the play-off final after defeating Bradford Park Avenue 1–0 in the semi-finals, before losing 3–0 in the final to Harrogate Town. In 2020–21 the club reached the second round of the FA Cup again; after defeating Bishop's Stortford 3–2 on penalties after a 3–3 draw in the first round, they lost 1–0 at Tranmere Rovers in the second. In 2021–22 the club were runners-up in the National League North, subsequently losing 1–0 to York City in the play-off semi-finals. They finished fourth in the division in 2022–23, going on to beat Gloucester City 5–3 on penalties in the play-off quarter-finals (after a 2–2 draw) and then Chester 1–0 in the semi-finals, before losing 2–0 in the final to Kidderminster Harriers. A third-place finish in 2023–24 was followed by another play-off campaign, in which the club beat Chorley 1–0 in the semi-finals and then lost 2–1 to Boston United in the final. The 2024–25 season saw the club win the National League North title, finally achieving promotion to the National League.

Brackley's first season in the National League saw them finish fourth-from-bottom of the division, resulting in relegation back to the National League North.

=== Reserve team ===
The club's reserve team played in the Hellenic League between 2015 and 2020. They joined Division One East of the league in 2014 under the name Brackley Town Development. After finishing as runners-up in their first season, they were promoted to the Premier Division and were renamed Brackley Town Saints. The team left the league at the end of the 2019–20 season.

== Ground ==
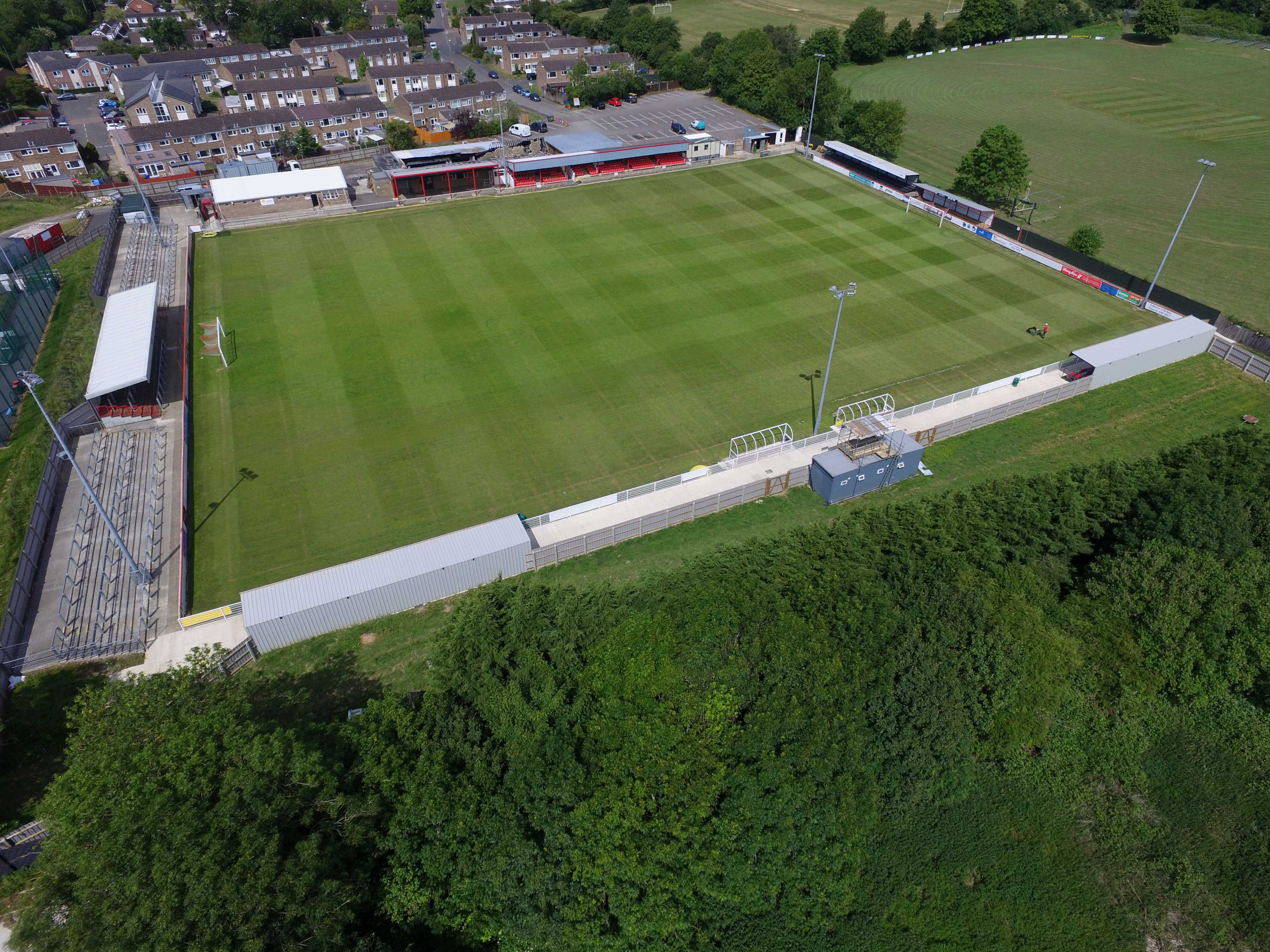
Aerial view of St James Park, Brackley - July 2020

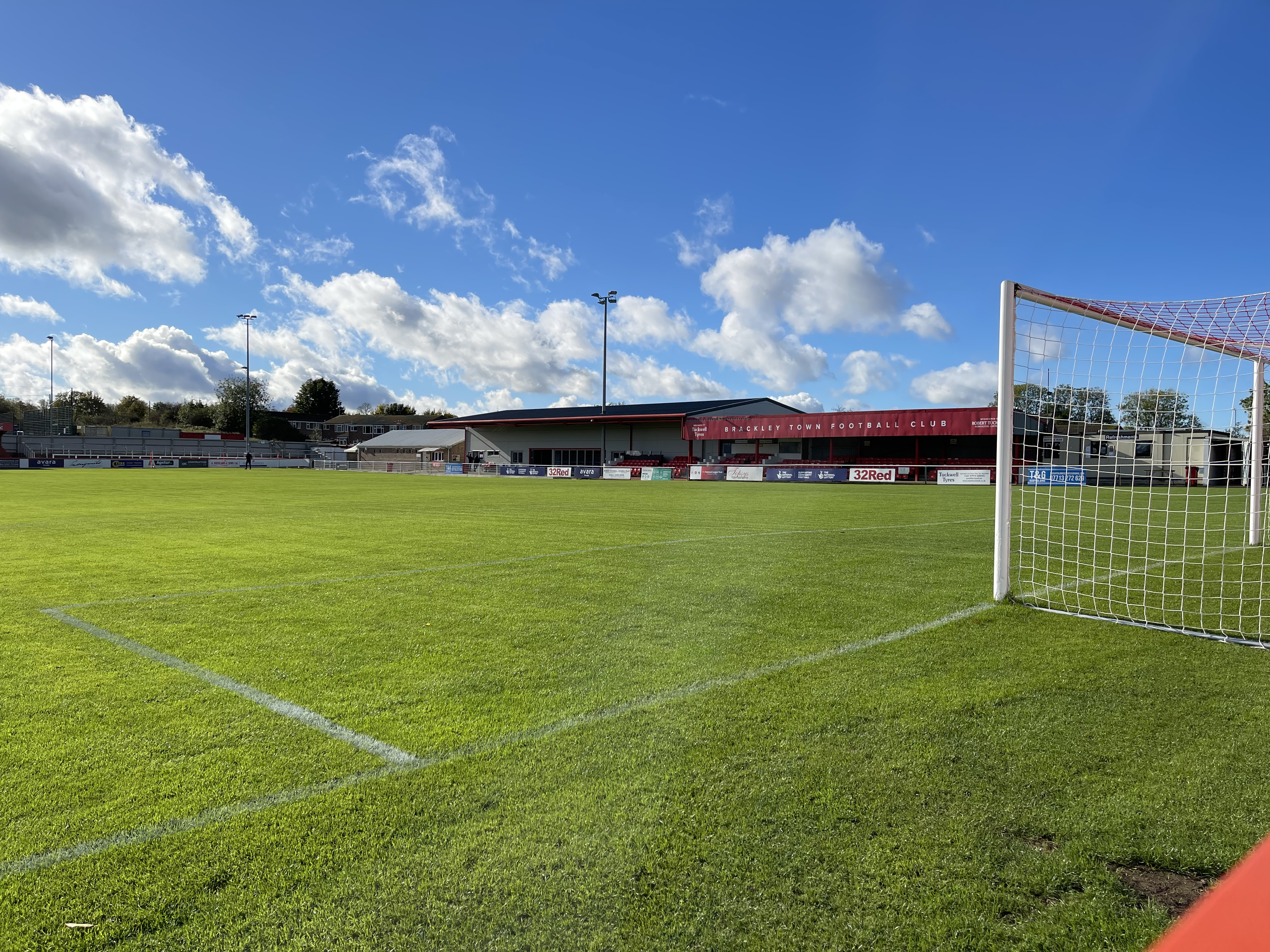
The Main Stand in July 2021

The club played at Manor Road from their establishment until 1968, when they moved to Buckingham Road, where the players changed in the nearby Plough pub. In 1974 they moved to St James Park on Churchill Way. Floodlights were installed during the 1988–89 season. During their first spell in the Southern League a 300-seat stand was built on one touchline. The ground currently has a capacity of 3,500, of which 300 is seated and 1,500 covered.

== Current squad ==
As of 15 August 2026

Note: Flags indicate national team as defined under FIFA eligibility rules; some limited exceptions apply. Players may hold more than one non-FIFA nationality.

| No. | Pos. | Nation | Player |
|---|---|---|---|
| 1 | GK | ENG | Harrison Rhone (on loan from Reading) |
| 2 | DF | ENG | Kieran Coates |
| 3 | DF | ENG | George Harmon |
| 4 | MF | ENG | Charlie Cooper |
| 5 | DF | ENG | Kyle Morrison |
| 6 | DF | ENG | Will Armitage |
| 7 | MF | ENG | Kian Pennant |
| 8 | MF | ENG | Ewan Williams |
| 9 | FW | ENG | Tahvon Campbell |
| 10 | MF | ENG | Kai Yearn |

| No. | Pos. | Nation | Player |
|---|---|---|---|
| 11 | FW | ENG | Matt Lowe |
| 12 | DF | ENG | Josh Tomlinson |
| 14 | DF | NIR | Tommy Fogarty (on loan from Tamworth) |
| 16 | MF | ENG | Kai Lissimore |
| 17 | MF | ENG | O'Shea Ellis |
| 18 | FW | ENG | DJ Campton-Sturridge |
| 19 | MF | ENG | I-Lani Edwards |
| 20 | GK | ENG | Alastair Worby |
| 21 | MF | ENG | Fin Roberts (on loan from Crewe Alexandra) |
| 22 | FW | ENG | Joshua Toluwaloju (on loan from Coventry City) |

== Current staff ==
As of 29 January 2026

=== Management board ===
| Position | Name |
|---|---|
| Chairman | Matt Wise |
| CEO | Janene Butters |
| Director | Francis Oliver |
| Director & Head of Football Admin | Tim Carroll |
| Head of Safeguarding | Nick Zammit |
| Head of Media & Design | Chris Tymon |
| Head of Commercial | Will Grashoff |
Source: Brackley Town

=== Football management ===
| Position | Name |
|---|---|
| Manager | Gareth Dean |
| Assistant Manager | Ali Worby |
| Assistant Manager | James Armson |
| Lead Physiotherapist | Aaron Lambley |
| Kit manager | Keith Marshall |
| Women's Head Coach | Andy Thompson |
Source: Brackley Town

== Honours ==
- FA Trophy
  - Winners 2017–18
- National League
  - National League North champions 2024–25
- Southern League
  - Premier Division champions 2011–12
  - Division One Midlands champions 2006–07
- Hellenic League
  - Premier Division champions 1996–97, 2003–04
  - Knock-Out Cup winners 1982–83
  - Supplementary Cup winners 2003–04
- United Counties League
  - Division One champions 1983–84
- Northamptonshire Senior Cup
  - Winners 2010–11, 2011–12, 2014–15
- Maunsell Cup
  - Winners 2011–12, 2012–13

== Records ==
- Highest league position: First in the National League North, 2024–25
- Best FA Cup performance: Second round, 2013–14, 2016–17, 2020–21, 2024–25, 2025–26
- Best FA Trophy performance: Winners, 2017–18
- Best FA Vase performance: Third round, 1987–88
- Record attendance: 3,074 vs Boston United, Conference North play-off final, 4 May 2024
- Most appearances: Glenn Walker
- Most goals: Paul Warrington, 320
- Record transfer fee received: £2,000 from Oxford City for Phil Mason, 1998

== See also ==
- Brackley Town F.C. players
- Brackley Town F.C. managers
