= Burton Park Wanderers F.C. =

Association football club in England

Coordinates: 52.3668°N 0.6893°W

Burton Park Wanderers
- Full name: Burton Park Wanderers Football Club
- Nickname: Wanderers
- Founded: 1961
- Ground: Latimer Park, Burton Latimer
- Chairman: Gina Cleverly
- League: Spartan South Midlands League Division One
- 2025–26: Northamptonshire Combination Premier Division, 4th of 14 (promoted)
Home colours	Away colours

Burton Park Wanderers Football Club is a football club based in Burton Latimer, Northamptonshire, England. They are currently members of the Spartan South Midlands League Division One and play at Latimer Park.

== History ==
The club was formed in 1961 as Kettering Park Wanderers. They joined Division Two of the United Counties League in 1968, which became Division One in 1972. The club adopted their current name in 1973. After finishing second-from-bottom of Division One in 1977–78, they were relegated to Division Two. However, the division was disbanded two years later and they were returned to Division One. In 1988–89 they were Division One runners-up, earning promotion to the Premier Division. Two seasons later they finished bottom of the Premier Division and were relegated back to Division One.

Burton Park Wanderers remained in Division One for the next thirty seasons, only finishing in the top half on four occasions and finishing bottom of the division in 1998–99, for five consecutive seasons between 2001–02 and 2005–06, and again in 2012–13, 2015–16 and 2016–17. At the end of the 2020–21 season they were transferred to Division One of the Spartan South Midlands League. They finished bottom of Division One in 2023–24 and were relegated to the Premier Division of the Northants Combination.

== Ground ==
The club initially played at the Rockingham Road Pleasure Park in Kettering before moving to the Pytchley Road pitches elsewhere in the town in the late 1960s. They relocated to Latimer Park in Burton Latimer in 1973.

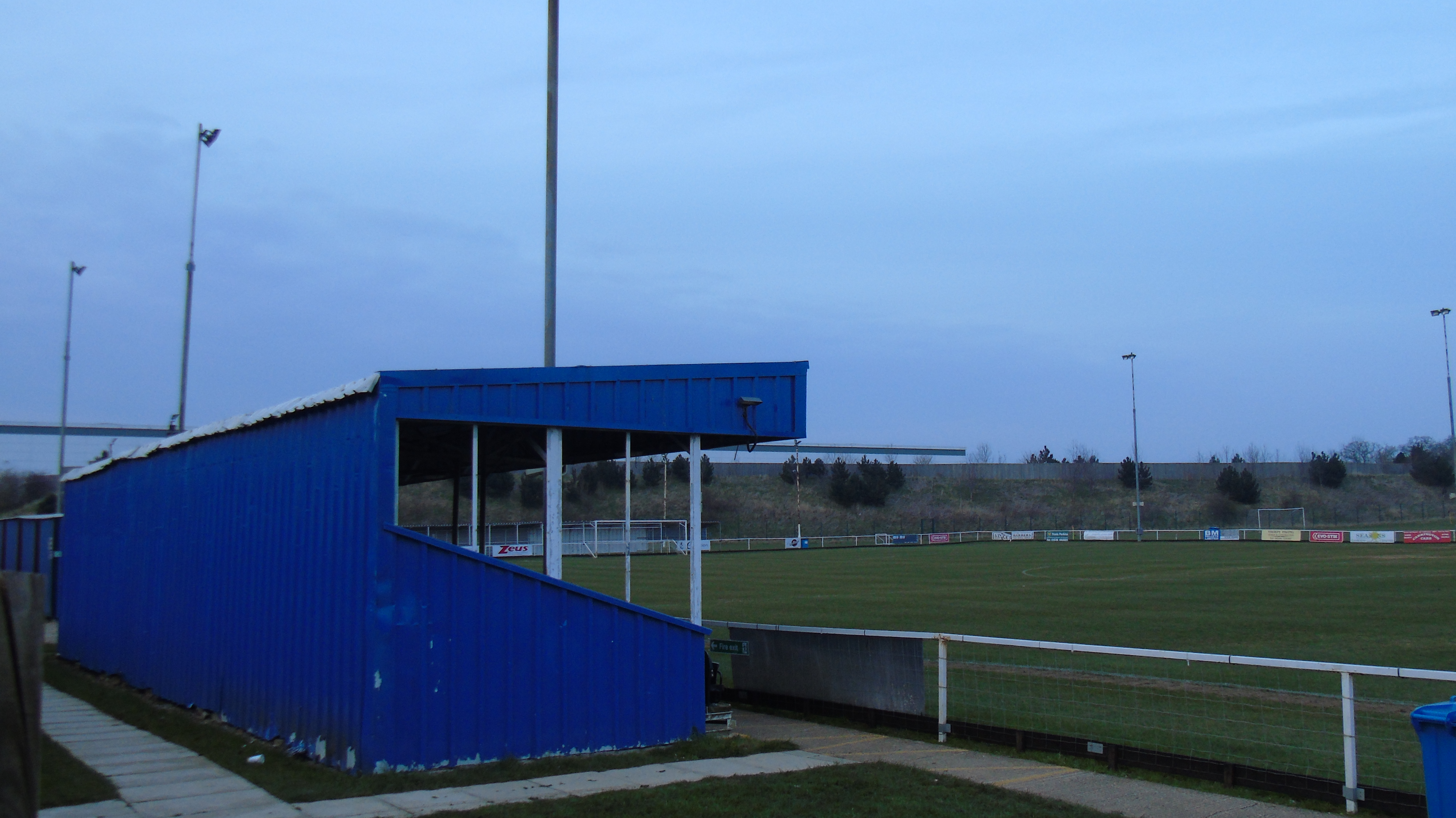
Main stand

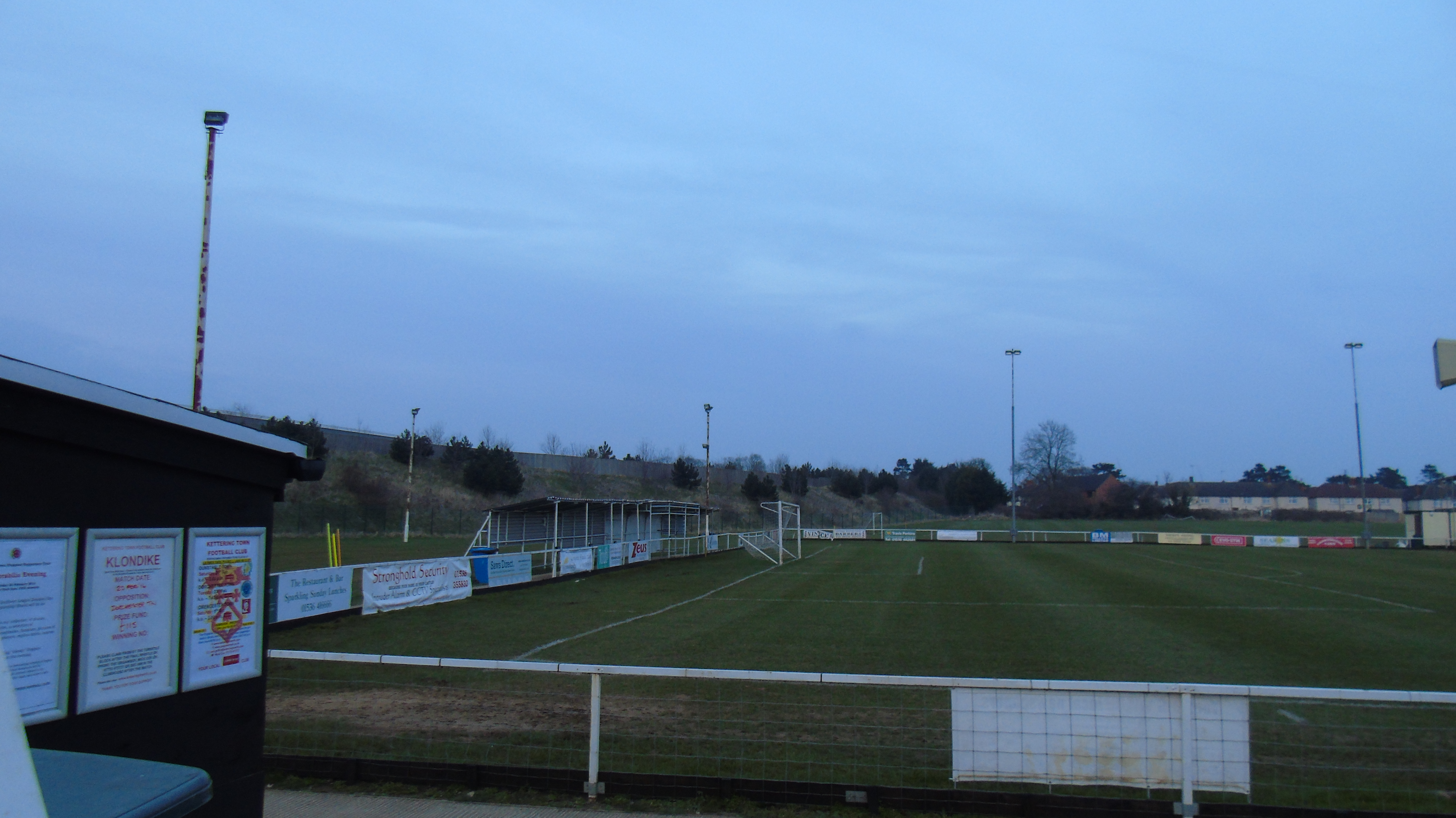
Morrisons End

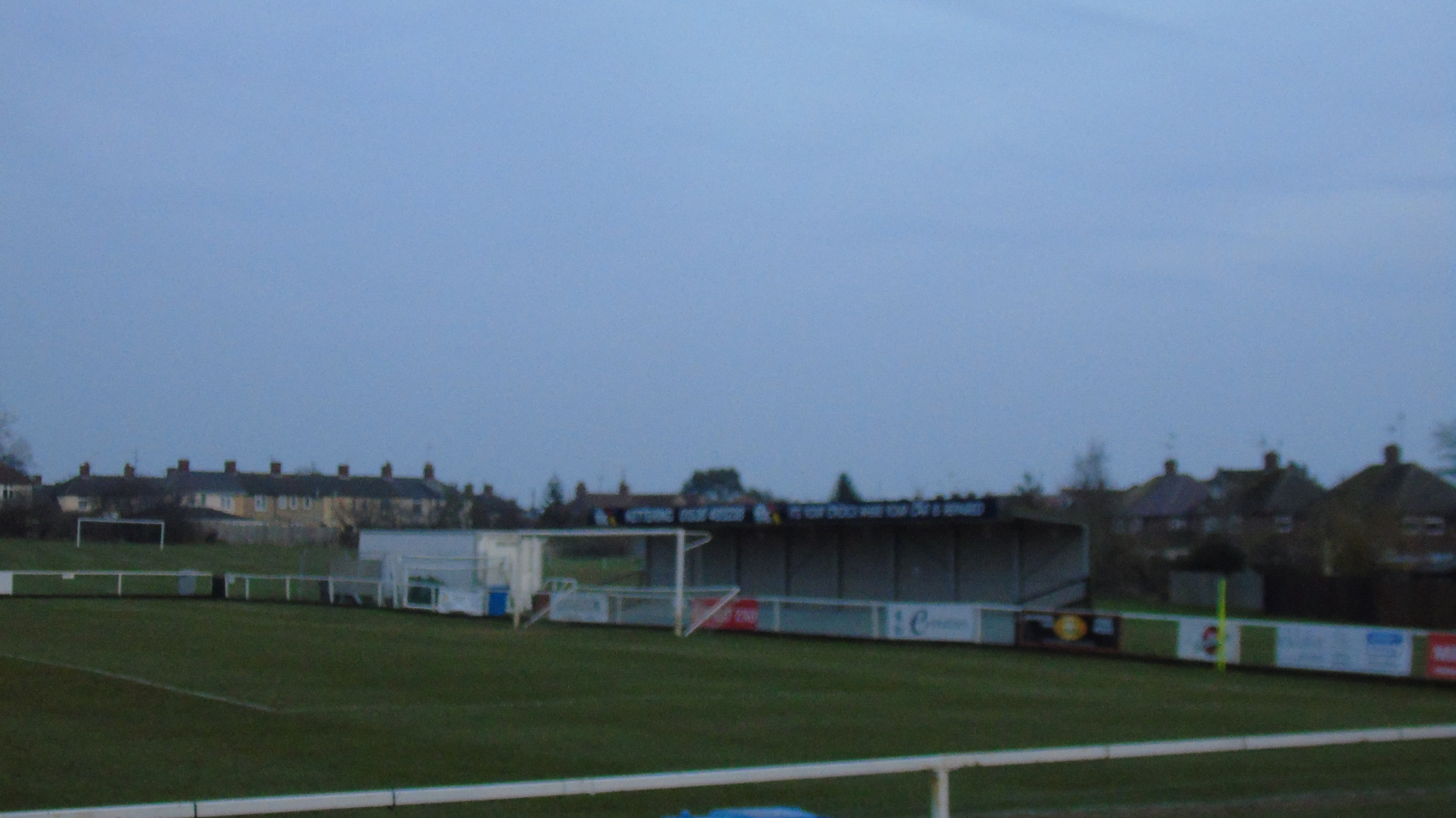
Station road covered terrace

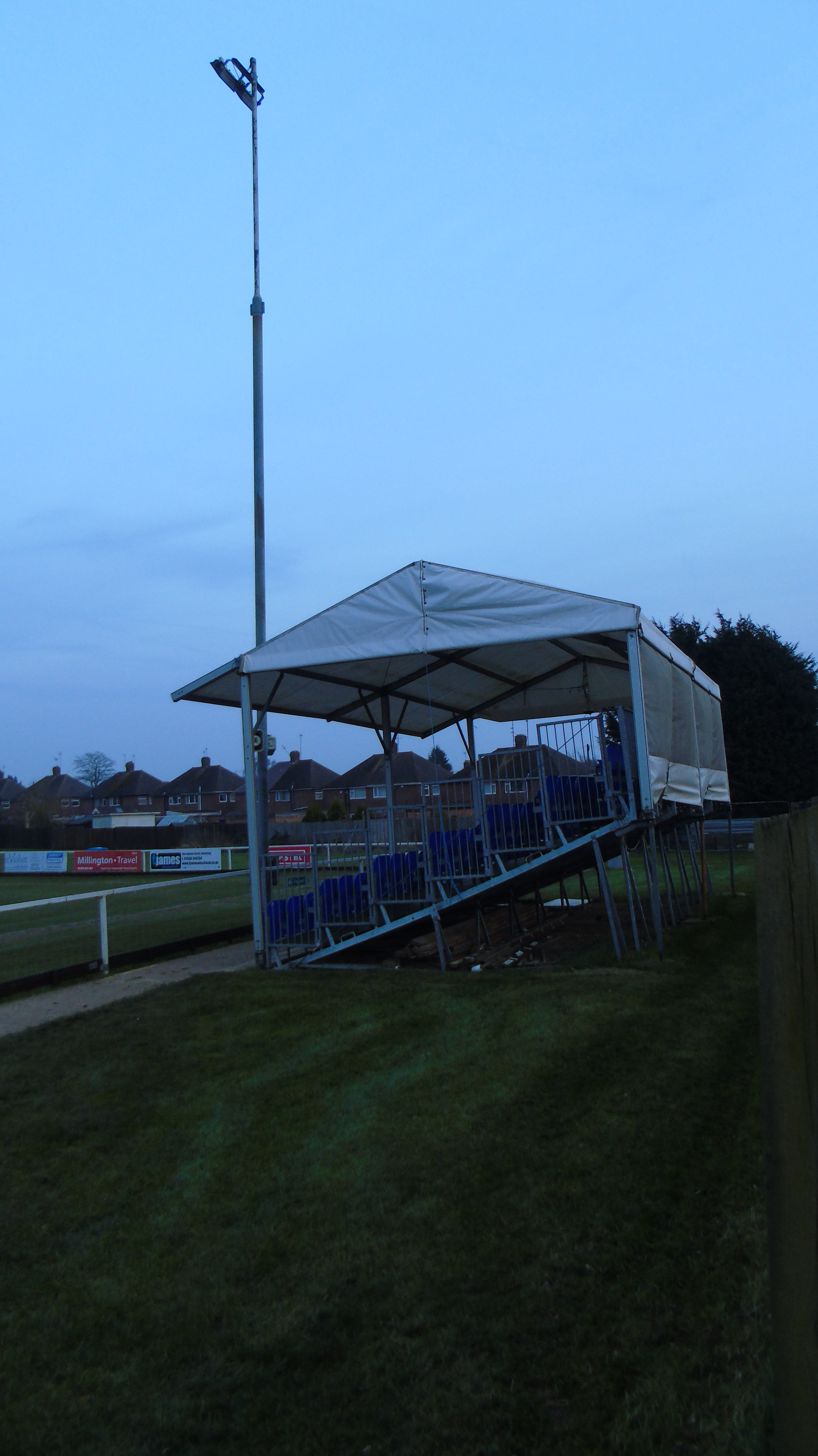
Temporary covered seating stand

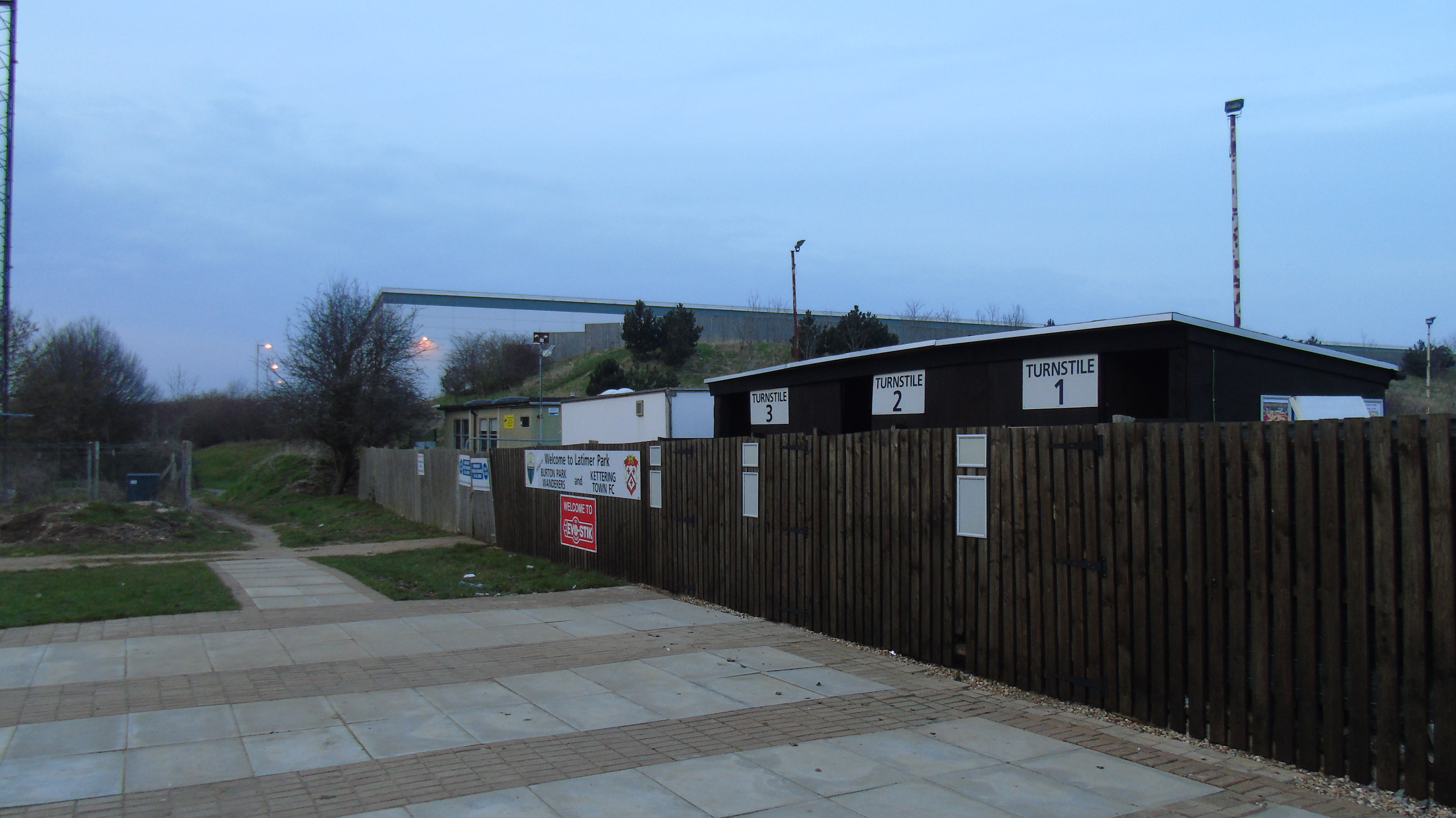
Ground entrance and turnstiles

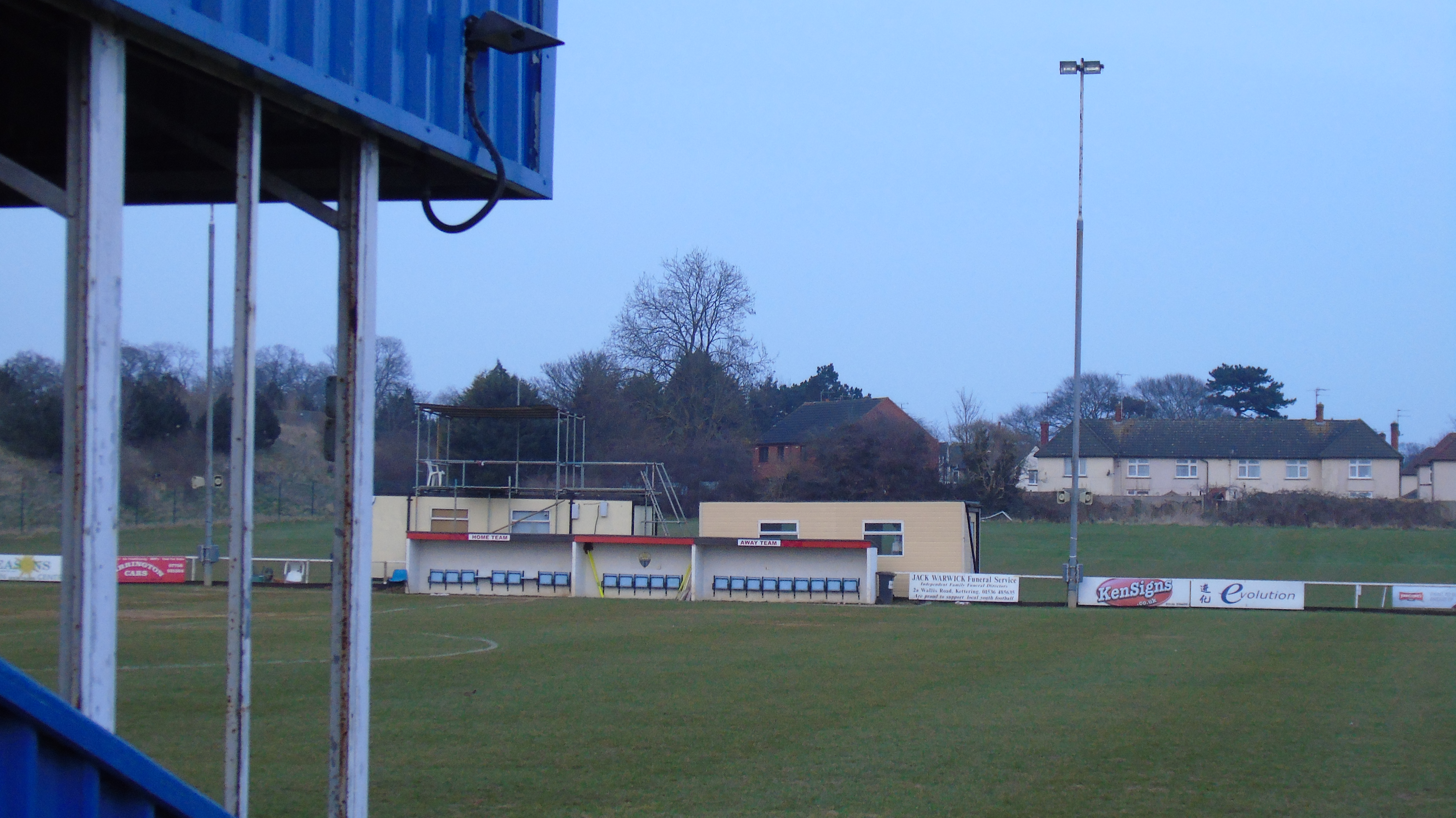
Dugout side and media TV gantry

== Records ==
- Best FA Cup performance: Extra preliminary round, 2020–21
- Best FA Vase performance: Second round, 1974–75, 2020–21
- Record attendance: 253 vs Rothwell Town, May 1989
