= Ramsey Town F.C. =

Association football club in England

Coordinates: 52.446663°N 0.113763°W

Ramsey Town
- Full name: Ramsey Town Football Club
- Nickname: The Rams
- Founded: 1880
- Ground: Cricketfield Lane, Ramsey
- League: Peterborough & District League Premier Division
- 2025–26: Peterborough & District League Premier Division, 9th of 15
Home colours

Ramsey Town Football Club is a football club based in Ramsey, Cambridgeshire, England. They are currently members of the Peterborough & District League Premier Division and play at Cricketfield Lane.

== History ==
Established in 1880, the club won the Hunts Junior Cup in 1908–09 and the Hunts Senior Cup the following season. They were champions of Division One of the Peterborough & District League in 1959–60 and won the Peterborough Senior Cup four times between 1969 and 1982.

Ramsey joined Division One of the United Counties League in 1985 and won the Senior Cup again during their first season in the league. They enjoyed consistent success in the division, winning it in 1988–89 (but were denied promotion due to their ground being deemed inadequate for the Premier Division), and never finishing lower than sixth in their first eight seasons in the league. They also won the Senior Cup for a third time in 1989–90, but resigned from the league during the 1996–97 season.

Ramsey returned to the Peterborough & District League, winning the Premier Division in 2008–09 and 2010–11. After finishing sixteenth in 2013–14, the club's first team folded, and the reserves, who had just been relegated to Division Three, became the new first team. They were Division Three runners-up in 2015–16, earning promotion to Division Two. The club won Division Two the following season and were promoted to Division One, but resigned from Division One three matches into the 2018–19 season.

Ramsey re-entered the league in Division Three at the start of the 2019–20 season. They were top of the table when the league was abandoned due to the COVID-19 pandemic, and were subsequently promoted to Division Two. This was repeated the following season, when they were top of the Division Two table after ten matches when the league was abandoned, this time being promoted back to Division One. They finished fifth in Division One in 2021–22, which was enough to be promoted to the Premier Division. The club finished bottom of the Premier Division in 2022–23 but avoided being relegated to Division One.

== Honours ==
- United Counties League
  - Division One champions 1988–89
- Peterborough & District League
  - Premier Division champions 2008–09, 2010–11
  - Division One champions 1959–60
  - Division Two champions 2016–17
  - Division Three Southern Section champions 1948-49
- Hunts Senior Cup
  - Winners 1909–10, 1985–86, 1989–90
- Hunts Junior Cup
  - Winners 1908–09, 1998–99

== Records ==
- Best FA Vase performance: First round replay, 1990–91
