= Blackstones F.C. =

Association football club in England

Coordinates: 52°39.7025′N 0°28.1355′W

Blackstones
- Full name: Blackstones Football Club
- Nickname: The Stones or Blackos
- Founded: 1891
- Ground: Lincoln Road, Stamford
- Capacity: 1,000 (100 seated)
- Chairman: Gary Peace
- Manager: Jon Harrison & Ryan Wood
- League: United Counties League Premier Division North
- 2024–25: United Counties League Division One, 4th of 19 (promoted via play-offs)
Home colours	Away colours

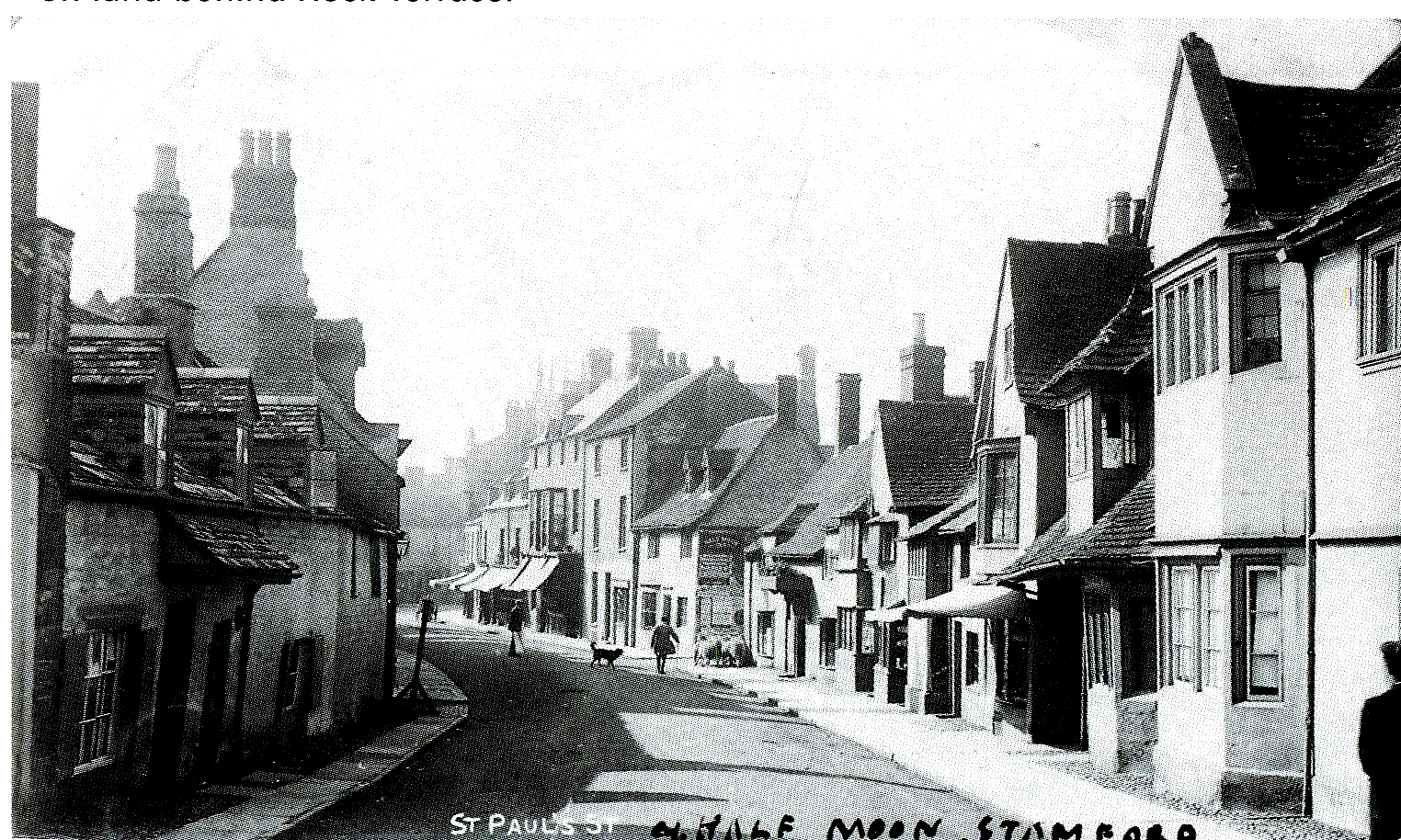
Half Moon Inn, St Pauls Street, Stamford Blackstones FC Original headquarters

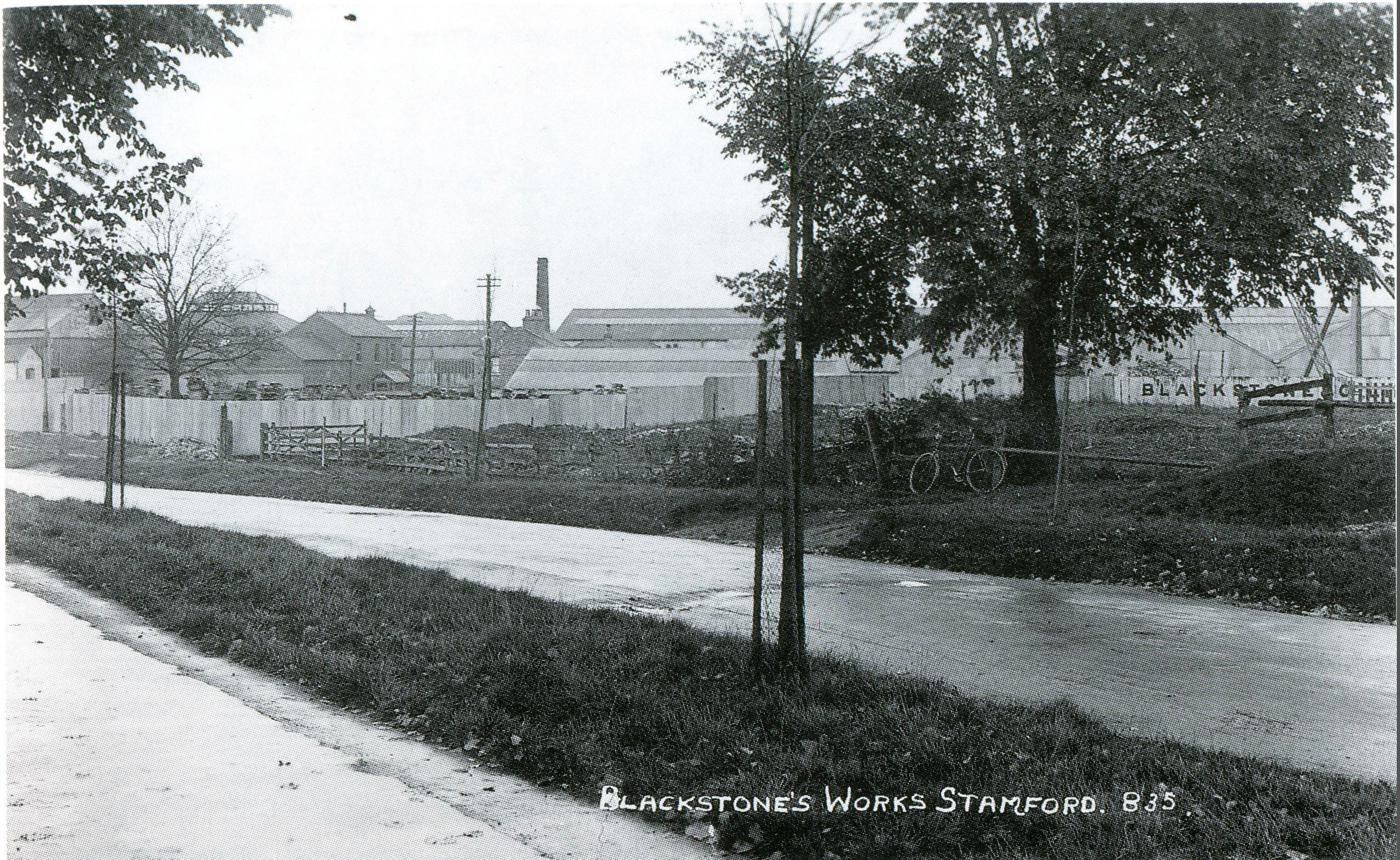
Blackstones Works site of first football matches, Ryhall Road, Stamford

Blackstones Football Club is a football club based in Stamford, Lincolnshire, England. They are currently members of the United Counties League Premier Division North and play at Lincoln Road. Their kit consists of Lincoln green (Lister Blackstone had Brunswick Green engines) and white shirts with black shorts and green socks.

== History ==
Formed as the works team of Blackstone & Co, the club won the Peterborough & District League in 1918–19. However, they subsequently dropped into more local football, playing in the Stamford & District and Bourne & District leagues, winning the last Stamford & District league title before World War II.

Following the war, Blackstones rejoined the Peterborough & District League. They finished bottom of Division One in 1950–51 and were relegated to Division Two. The following season saw them finish bottom of Division Two, after which they left the league. They rejoined the league in 1959, and were Division Two champions in 1961–62 and Division One champions in 1975–76. During this period they were renamed Mirrlees Blackstone after the company merged with Mirrlees National Limited in 1969.

In 1984 Blackstones joined Division One of the United Counties League. After finishing as runners-up in 1987–88, they were promoted to the Premier Division. The 1992−93 season saw them win the Lincolnshire Senior 'A' Cup, beating Bourne Town in the final. In 1998 they adopted their current name after Mirrlees Blackstone closed its Stamford works. In 2002–03 they won the Premier Division Knock-Out Cup with a 4–0 win against Buckingham Town in the final; the following season they won the Lincolnshire Senior 'A' Cup for a second time.

After finishing second-from-bottom of the Premier Division in 2012−13, Blackstones were relegated to Division One. They finished fourth in Division One in 2024–25, qualifying for the promotion play-offs. After beating Retford United 3–0 in the semi-finals, they defeated Retford 3–2 in the final, earning promotion to the Premier Division North.

== Ground ==
The site that became Lincoln Road was bought by the Rutland Engineering Works in 1920; it initially consisted of two football pitches and a cricket square. In 1965 a new clubhouse was built to replace the cricket pavilion, which was demolished. In the late 1970s or early 1980s a new stand was built in its place, at which point the ground stopped being used for cricket, the second football pitch was lost and part of the site sold for housing.

Floodlights were installed in 1989. The ground currently has a capacity of 1,000, of which 100 is seated and covered.

== Managerial history ==
- Peter Thomas
- Bernard Peck
- Ian Jarvie and Stuart Gray
- Chris Corby
- Steve Blades
- Dominic Genovese (1997–1999)
- Vince Adams (1999–2001)
- Ian Jackson (2001)
- Mel Landin (2001–2004)
- Kevin Flynn (2004)
- Tony Lowther (2004–2008)
- David Bird (2008–2010)
- Darren Jarvis and Mike Goode (2010–2012)
- David Stratton (2012–2013)
- Gary Peace (2013–2014)
- Nick Anderson (2014)
- Neil Cotton (2014–2015)
- Phil Gadsby (2015–2017)
- Andy Lodge (2017)
- Daniel French & Lee Clarke (2017–2020)
- Mark Baines (2020–2021)
- Alfie Tate (2021–2021)
- Ryan Hunnings (2021)
- Lloyd Burton (2021–2022)
- Jon Harrison and Ryan Wood (2022–)

== Honours ==
- United Counties League
  - Premier Division Knock-Out Cup winners 2002–03
- Peterborough & District League
  - Champions 1918–19
  - Division One champions 1975–76
  - Division Two champions 1961–62
- Lincolnshire Senior 'A' Cup
  - Winners 1992–93, 2003–04, 2007–08
- Lincolnshire Senior Trophy
  - Winners 2010–11

== Records ==
- Best FA Cup performance: Second qualifying round, 1991−92
- Best FA Vase performance: Fourth round, 2007−08
- Record attendance: 700 vs Glinton

== See also ==
- Blackstones F.C. players
