= 1996–97 Eastern Counties Football League =

The 1996–97 season was the 55th in the history of Eastern Counties Football League a football competition in England.

Wroxham were champions, winning their fourth Eastern Counties Football League title, while Wisbech Town were promoted to the Southern Football League, returning to the Southern League after seventeen seasons in the Eastern Counties Football League.

== Premier Division ==
Eastern Counties Football League Premier Division
- Season: 1996–97
- Champions: Wroxham
- Promoted: Wisbech Town
- Relegated: Hadleigh United; March Town United
- Matches: 506
- Goals: 1,751 (3.46 per match)

The Premier Division featured 20 clubs which competed in the division last season, along with three new clubs:

- Bury Town, relegated from the Southern Football League
- Gorleston, promoted from Division One
- Warboys Town, promoted from Division One

Also, Felixstowe Town changed name to Felixstowe Port & Town.

=== League table ===
Pos	Team	Pld	W	D	L	GF	GA	GD	Pts	Promotion or relegation
1	Wroxham	44	34	7	3	122	25	+97	109	
2	Wisbech Town	44	32	8	4	141	37	+104	104	Promoted to the Southern Football League
3	Harwich & Parkeston	44	32	8	4	133	34	+99	104	
4	Diss Town	44	29	4	11	81	41	+40	91	
5	Great Yarmouth Town	44	26	7	11	87	51	+36	85	
6	Gorleston	44	26	5	13	86	54	+32	83	
7	Bury Town	44	23	10	11	101	54	+47	79	
8	Newmarket Town	44	23	8	13	97	75	+22	77	
9	Lowestoft Town	44	22	9	13	84	56	+28	75	
10	Stowmarket Town	44	22	4	18	74	62	+12	70	
11	Tiptree United	44	19	8	17	64	59	+5	65	
12	Halstead Town	44	19	6	19	87	79	+8	63	
13	Soham Town Rangers	44	17	7	20	82	87	−5	58	
14	Fakenham Town	44	15	11	18	78	80	−2	56	
15	Warboys Town	44	15	10	19	62	72	−10	55	
16	Woodbridge Town	44	12	12	20	51	63	−12	48	
17	Sudbury Wanderers	44	13	5	26	61	100	−39	44	
18	Felixstowe Port & Town	44	11	6	27	56	103	−47	39	
19	Watton United	44	10	6	28	49	106	−57	36	
20	Sudbury Town reserves	44	7	7	30	46	96	−50	28	Resigned from the league
21	Clacton Town	44	7	5	32	43	156	−113	26	
22	Hadleigh United	44	5	8	31	41	128	−87	23	Relegated to Division One
23	March Town United	44	5	3	36	25	133	−108	18	Relegated to Division One

Source: fchd
Rules for classification: 1) points; 2) goal difference; 3) number of goals scored.

== Division One ==
Eastern Counties Football League Division One
- Season: 1996–97
- Champions: Ely City
- Promoted: Ely City; Histon
- Matches: 306
- Goals: 983 (3.21 per match)

Division One featured 13 clubs which competed in the division last season, along with five new clubs:

- Cambridge City reserves
- Cornard United, relegated from the Premier Division
- Haverhill Rovers, relegated from the Premier Division
- Maldon Town, transferred from the Essex Senior League
- Needham Market, joined from the Suffolk & Ipswich League

=== League table ===
Pos	Team	Pld	W	D	L	GF	GA	GD	Pts	Promotion
1	Ely City	34	27	5	2	93	36	+57	86	Promoted to the Premier Division
2	Histon	34	22	7	5	85	31	+54	73	Promoted to the Premier Division
3	Maldon Town	34	21	6	7	89	44	+45	69	
4	Needham Market	34	19	11	4	67	24	+43	68	
5	Ipswich Wanderers	34	20	6	8	80	35	+45	66	
6	Brightlingsea United	34	14	14	6	50	33	+17	56	
7	Swaffham Town	34	13	13	8	62	48	+14	52	
8	Haverhill Rovers	34	15	7	12	54	46	+8	52	
9	Stanway Rovers	34	15	7	12	55	49	+6	52	
10	Whitton United	34	10	9	15	45	58	−13	39	
11	Norwich United	34	10	8	16	48	61	−13	38	
12	Cambridge City reserves	34	10	7	17	51	68	−17	37	
13	Downham Town	34	9	4	21	45	88	−43	31	
14	Thetford Town	34	7	9	18	34	66	−32	30	
15	Mildenhall Town	34	7	8	19	35	61	−26	29	
16	Cornard United	34	6	8	20	40	70	−30	26	
17	Somersham Town	34	5	10	19	23	69	−46	25	
18	Chatteris Town	34	2	9	23	27	96	−69	15	

Source: fchd
Rules for classification: 1) points; 2) goal difference; 3) number of goals scored.
