= 1999–2000 Eastern Counties Football League =

The 1999–2000 season was the 58th in the history of Eastern Counties Football League a football competition in England.

Histon were champions, winning their first Eastern Counties Football League title and were promoted to the Southern Football League for the first time in their history.

== Premier Division ==
Eastern Counties Football League Premier Division
- Season: 1999–2000
- Champions: Histon
- Promoted: Histon
- Matches: 420
- Goals: 1,303 (3.1 per match)

The Premier Division featured 20 clubs which competed in the division last season, along with two new clubs, promoted from Division One:

- Clacton Town
- Mildenhall Town

Sudbury Town merged with Sudbury Wanderers to form new club AFC Sudbury.

Histon won the league on the last day of the season, coming from behind to win 2–1 win away at Gorleston with Wayne Goddard scoring the winner in the 76th minute. The victory meant that title rivals Wroxham, who still had a game in hand against Warboys Town, could not catch them. Histon's victory gained them promotion to the Southern Football League and also saved Felixstowe Port & Town from relegation as, had Wroxham won, they would not have been promoted.

=== League table ===
Pos	Team	Pld	W	D	L	GF	GA	GD	Pts	Promotion or relegation
1	Histon	40	29	6	5	95	42	+53	93	Promoted to the Southern Football League
2	Wroxham	40	28	8	4	86	39	+47	92	
3	AFC Sudbury	40	28	6	6	106	48	+58	90	
4	Clacton Town	40	22	9	9	92	59	+33	75	
5	Lowestoft Town	40	20	10	10	58	36	+22	70	
6	Mildenhall Town	40	18	9	13	62	52	+10	63	
7	Woodbridge Town	40	17	9	14	63	51	+12	60	
8	Diss Town	40	17	9	14	69	62	+7	60	
9	Maldon Town	40	18	6	16	61	63	−2	60	
10	Ipswich Wanderers	40	16	8	16	59	60	−1	56	
11	Fakenham Town	40	14	12	14	55	55	0	54	
12	Great Yarmouth Town	40	14	10	16	50	52	−2	52	
13	Gorleston	40	14	9	17	76	69	+7	51	
14	Newmarket Town	40	14	8	18	60	69	−9	50	
15	Warboys Town	40	13	9	18	55	65	−10	48	
16	Soham Town Rangers	40	12	5	23	52	76	−24	41	
17	Bury Town	40	8	12	20	38	65	−27	36	
18	Halstead Town	40	8	8	24	52	89	−37	32	
19	Stowmarket Town	40	8	8	24	40	83	−43	32	
20	Harwich & Parkeston	40	7	8	25	42	84	−42	29	
21	Felixstowe Port & Town	40	7	7	26	32	84	−52	28	
22	Watton United	0	0	0	0	0	0	0	0	Resigned to the Anglian Combination, record expunged

Source: fchd
Rules for classification: 1) points; 2) goal difference; 3) number of goals scored.

== Division One ==
Eastern Counties Football League Division One
- Season: 1999–2000
- Champions: Tiptree United
- Promoted: Ely City; Tiptree United
- Matches: 306
- Goals: 1,003 (3.28 per match)

Division One featured 16 clubs which competed in the division last season, along with two new clubs:

- Cambridge City reserves
- Ely City, relegated from the Premier Division

=== League table ===
Pos	Team	Pld	W	D	L	GF	GA	GD	Pts	Promotion
1	Tiptree United	34	23	9	2	89	19	+70	78	Promoted to the Premier Division
2	Ely City	34	23	4	7	89	34	+55	73	Promoted to the Premier Division
3	Stanway Rovers	34	21	8	5	68	31	+37	71	
4	Downham Town	34	22	4	8	77	36	+41	70	
5	Needham Market	34	20	5	9	76	46	+30	64 (Note: Needham Market were deducted one point for fielding an ineligible player.)	
6	Cambridge City reserves	34	18	6	10	70	44	+26	60	
7	Dereham Town	34	16	5	13	53	36	+17	53	
8	Hadleigh United	34	15	7	12	52	44	+8	52	
9	Swaffham Town	34	16	4	14	47	42	+5	52	
10	Cornard United	34	14	10	10	42	44	−2	52	
11	Whitton United	34	14	6	14	64	58	+6	48	
12	Somersham Town	34	14	6	14	55	58	−3	48	
13	March Town United	34	10	7	17	48	78	−30	37	
14	Haverhill Rovers	34	9	7	18	40	71	−31	34	
15	Norwich United	34	6	3	25	44	99	−55	21	
16	Chatteris Town	34	4	7	23	31	75	−44	19	
17	Brightlingsea United	34	5	4	25	31	84	−53	19	
18	Thetford Town	34	3	4	27	27	104	−77	13	

Source: fchd
Rules for classification: 1) points; 2) goal difference; 3) number of goals scored.
