= 2007–08 Eastern Counties Football League =

The 2007–08 season was the 66th in the history of Eastern Counties Football League, a football competition in England.

Soham Town Rangers were champions, winning their first Eastern Counties Football League title and were promoted to the Southern Football League for the first time in their history.

== Premier Division ==
Eastern Counties Football League Premier Division
- Season: 2007–08
- Champions: Soham Town Rangers
- Promoted: Soham Town Rangers
- Relegated: Ipswich Wanderers; Newmarket Town; Swaffham Town
- Matches: 462
- Goals: 1,630 (3.53 per match)

The Premier Division featured 19 clubs which competed in the division last season, along with three new clubs, promoted from Division One:

- Haverhill Rovers
- Swaffham Town
- Walsham-le-Willows

Also, Kirkley changed name to Kirkley & Pakefield.

=== League table ===
Pos	Team	Pld	W	D	L	GF	GA	GD	Pts	Promotion or relegation
1	Soham Town Rangers	42	31	6	5	108	34	+74	99	Promoted to the Southern League
2	Needham Market	42	29	7	6	114	56	+58	94	
3	Wroxham	42	27	6	9	103	44	+59	87	
4	Dereham Town	42	23	7	12	92	59	+33	76	
5	Mildenhall Town	42	22	10	10	75	47	+28	76	
6	Kirkley & Pakefield	42	21	10	11	82	54	+28	73	
7	Stanway Rovers	42	20	10	12	82	62	+20	70	
8	Felixstowe & Walton United	42	20	7	15	82	74	+8	67	
9	Leiston	42	17	11	14	65	57	+8	62	
10	Haverhill Rovers	42	19	5	18	72	66	+6	62	
11	Lowestoft Town	42	18	4	20	88	91	−3	58	
12	Wisbech Town	42	18	4	20	60	83	−23	58	
13	Cambridge Regional College	42	16	9	17	77	63	+14	57	
14	King's Lynn reserves	42	15	9	18	66	64	+2	54	
15	Norwich United	42	13	8	21	49	75	−26	47	
16	Walsham-le-Willows	42	14	5	23	54	98	−44	47	
17	Woodbridge Town	42	13	7	22	67	96	−29	46	
18	Harwich & Parkeston	42	13	4	25	62	98	−36	43	
19	Histon reserves	42	12	4	26	67	84	−17	40	
20	Swaffham Town	42	10	9	23	59	99	−40	38 (Note: Swaffham Town were deducted one point.)	Relegated to Division One
21	Newmarket Town	42	8	6	28	62	107	−45	30	Relegated to Division One
22	Ipswich Wanderers	42	7	4	31	44	119	−75	25	Relegated to Division One

Source: fchd
Rules for classification: 1) points; 2) goal difference; 3) number of goals scored.

== Division One ==
Eastern Counties Football League Division One
- Season: 2007–08
- Champions: Tiptree United
- Promoted: Ely City; Tiptree United; Whitton United
- Matches: 342
- Goals: 1,188 (3.47 per match)

Division One featured 16 clubs which competed in the division last season, along with three new clubs, relegated from the Premier Division:

- Clacton Town, who also changed name to Clacton
- Diss Town
- Halstead Town

=== League table ===
Pos	Team	Pld	W	D	L	GF	GA	GD	Pts	Promotion
1	Tiptree United	36	28	2	6	88	39	+49	86	Promoted to the Premier Division
2	Ely City	36	22	8	6	81	42	+39	74	Promoted to the Premier Division
3	Whitton United	36	18	10	8	94	42	+52	64	Promoted to the Premier Division
4	Diss Town	36	19	6	11	86	47	+39	63	
5	Hadleigh United	36	18	9	9	71	42	+29	63	
6	Halstead Town	36	18	10	8	72	45	+27	63 (Note: Halstead Town were deducted one point.)	
7	Saffron Walden Town	36	17	10	9	49	36	+13	61	
8	Gorleston	36	17	9	10	87	62	+25	60	
9	Debenham LC	36	17	10	9	66	38	+28	58 (Note: Debenham LC were deducted three points.)	
10	Clacton	36	16	10	10	73	59	+14	58	
11	Great Yarmouth Town	36	12	8	16	58	71	−13	44	
12	Downham Town	36	11	10	15	42	67	−25	43	
13	Thetford Town	36	9	12	15	59	71	−12	39	
14	Stowmarket Town	36	10	9	17	61	76	−15	39	
15	March Town United	36	6	14	16	54	82	−28	32	
16	Godmanchester Rovers	36	8	6	22	36	76	−40	30	
17	Fakenham Town	36	6	6	24	40	112	−72	24	
18	Cornard United	36	4	9	23	36	94	−58	21	
19	Long Melford	36	5	4	27	35	87	−52	19	

Source: fchd
Rules for classification: 1) points; 2) goal difference; 3) number of goals scored.
