= 2006–07 Eastern Counties Football League =

The 2006–07 season was the 65th in the history of Eastern Counties Football League a football competition in England.

Wroxham were champions, winning their seventh Eastern Counties Football League title.

== Premier Division ==
Eastern Counties Football League Premier Division
- Season: 2006–07
- Champions: Wroxham
- Relegated: Clacton Town; Diss Town; Halstead Town
- Matches: 462
- Goals: 1,603 (3.47 per match)

The Premier Division featured 19 clubs which competed in the division last season, along with three new clubs:

- Cambridge Regional College, new club taking place of Cambridge City reserves
- Felixstowe & Walton United, promoted from Division One
- Stanway Rovers, promoted from Division One

=== League table ===
| Pos | Team | Pld | W | D | L | GF | GA | GD | Pts | Promotion or relegation |
|---|---|---|---|---|---|---|---|---|---|---|
| 1 | Wroxham | 42 | 31 | 9 | 2 | 107 | 27 | +80 | 102 | |
| 2 | Mildenhall Town | 42 | 31 | 4 | 7 | 105 | 56 | +49 | 97 | |
| 3 | Lowestoft Town | 42 | 26 | 10 | 6 | 103 | 51 | +52 | 88 | |
| 4 | Needham Market | 42 | 25 | 6 | 11 | 85 | 51 | +34 | 81 | |
| 5 | Leiston | 42 | 24 | 7 | 11 | 98 | 71 | +27 | 79 | |
| 6 | Dereham Town | 42 | 22 | 8 | 12 | 97 | 73 | +24 | 74 | |
| 7 | Kirkley | 42 | 21 | 11 | 10 | 65 | 46 | +19 | 74 | |
| 8 | Soham Town Rangers | 42 | 21 | 6 | 15 | 81 | 62 | +19 | 69 | |
| 9 | Woodbridge Town | 42 | 17 | 11 | 14 | 83 | 80 | +3 | 62 | |
| 10 | Ipswich Wanderers | 42 | 17 | 7 | 18 | 71 | 58 | +13 | 58 | |
| 11 | Wisbech Town | 42 | 14 | 9 | 19 | 71 | 77 | −6 | 51 | |
| 12 | Newmarket Town | 42 | 14 | 4 | 24 | 57 | 82 | −25 | 46 | |
| 13 | Felixstowe & Walton United | 42 | 14 | 4 | 24 | 61 | 99 | −38 | 46 | |
| 14 | Stanway Rovers | 42 | 12 | 9 | 21 | 56 | 76 | −20 | 45 | |
| 15 | Histon reserves | 42 | 12 | 9 | 21 | 61 | 82 | −21 | 45 | |
| 16 | Norwich United | 42 | 10 | 14 | 18 | 44 | 72 | −28 | 44 | |
| 17 | Cambridge Regional College | 42 | 12 | 6 | 24 | 60 | 79 | −19 | 42 | |
| 18 | Harwich & Parkeston | 42 | 12 | 6 | 24 | 67 | 96 | −29 | 42 | |
| 19 | King's Lynn reserves | 42 | 10 | 11 | 21 | 60 | 76 | −16 | 41 | |
| 20 | Diss Town | 42 | 11 | 6 | 25 | 58 | 87 | −29 | 39 | Relegated to Division One |
| 21 | Clacton Town | 42 | 11 | 5 | 26 | 60 | 119 | −59 | 38 | Relegated to Division One |
| 22 | Halstead Town | 42 | 9 | 10 | 23 | 53 | 83 | −30 | 37 | Relegated to Division One |

Source: fchd
Rules for classification: 1) points; 2) goal difference; 3) number of goals scored.

== Division One ==
Eastern Counties Football League Division One
- Season: 2006–07
- Champions: Walsham-le-Willows
- Promoted: Haverhill Rovers; Swaffham Town; Walsham-le-Willows
- Matches: 342
- Goals: 1,124 (3.29 per match)

Division One featured 19 clubs which competed in the division last season, no new clubs joined the division this season.

=== League table ===
| Pos | Team | Pld | W | D | L | GF | GA | GD | Pts | Promotion |
|---|---|---|---|---|---|---|---|---|---|---|
| 1 | Walsham-le-Willows | 36 | 25 | 5 | 6 | 68 | 26 | +42 | 80 | Promoted to the Premier Division |
| 2 | Haverhill Rovers | 36 | 22 | 11 | 3 | 86 | 27 | +59 | 77 | Promoted to the Premier Division |
| 3 | Swaffham Town | 36 | 23 | 8 | 5 | 80 | 34 | +46 | 77 | Promoted to the Premier Division |
| 4 | Ely City | 36 | 23 | 7 | 6 | 90 | 36 | +54 | 76 | |
| 5 | Debenham LC | 36 | 20 | 10 | 6 | 89 | 50 | +39 | 70 | |
| 6 | Saffron Walden Town | 36 | 20 | 10 | 6 | 59 | 32 | +27 | 70 | |
| 7 | Tiptree United | 36 | 20 | 9 | 7 | 97 | 52 | +45 | 69 | |
| 8 | Whitton United | 36 | 20 | 7 | 9 | 76 | 45 | +31 | 67 | |
| 9 | Hadleigh United | 36 | 15 | 9 | 12 | 46 | 47 | −1 | 54 | |
| 10 | Fakenham Town | 36 | 14 | 8 | 14 | 58 | 54 | +4 | 50 | |
| 11 | Thetford Town | 36 | 12 | 4 | 20 | 40 | 57 | −17 | 40 | |
| 12 | Stowmarket Town | 36 | 11 | 7 | 18 | 52 | 72 | −20 | 40 | |
| 13 | Great Yarmouth Town | 36 | 11 | 5 | 20 | 40 | 67 | −27 | 38 | |
| 14 | Gorleston | 36 | 10 | 4 | 22 | 53 | 96 | −43 | 34 | |
| 15 | Cornard United | 36 | 8 | 6 | 22 | 42 | 80 | −38 | 30 | |
| 16 | Long Melford | 36 | 7 | 5 | 24 | 51 | 101 | −50 | 26 | |
| 17 | Godmanchester Rovers | 36 | 6 | 4 | 26 | 29 | 85 | −56 | 22 | |
| 18 | Downham Town | 36 | 4 | 8 | 24 | 33 | 85 | −52 | 20 | |
| 19 | March Town United | 36 | 4 | 7 | 25 | 35 | 78 | −43 | 19 | |

Source: fchd
Rules for classification: 1) points; 2) goal difference; 3) number of goals scored.
