= 1997–98 Eastern Counties Football League =

The 1997–98 season was the 56th in the history of Eastern Counties Football League a football competition in England.

Wroxham were champions for the second season in a row, winning their fifth Eastern Counties Football League title

== Premier Division ==
Eastern Counties Football League Premier Division
- Season: 1997–98
- Champions: Wroxham
- Relegated: Clacton Town; Tiptree United
- Matches: 462
- Goals: 1,565 (3.39 per match)

The Premier Division featured 19 clubs which competed in the division last season, along with three new clubs:

- Ely City, promoted from Division One
- Histon, promoted from Division One
- Sudbury Town, resigned from the Southern Football League and replaced reserve team

=== League table ===
Pos	Team	Pld	W	D	L	GF	GA	GD	Pts	Promotion or relegation
1	Wroxham	42	30	7	5	80	26	+54	97	
2	Ely City	42	29	8	5	91	43	+48	95	
3	Histon	42	27	7	8	102	46	+56	88	
4	Sudbury Wanderers	42	25	4	13	100	55	+45	79	
5	Great Yarmouth Town	42	21	8	13	80	60	+20	71	
6	Sudbury Town	42	19	13	10	81	43	+38	70	
7	Halstead Town	42	19	8	15	80	64	+16	65	
8	Felixstowe Port & Town	42	20	4	18	58	43	+15	64	
9	Lowestoft Town	42	18	10	14	82	70	+12	64	
10	Fakenham Town	42	18	9	15	68	61	+7	63	
11	Newmarket Town	42	18	7	17	68	52	+16	61	
12	Woodbridge Town	42	15	14	13	74	71	+3	59	
13	Stowmarket Town	42	17	4	21	63	81	−18	55	
14	Gorleston	42	14	12	16	62	63	−1	54	
15	Soham Town Rangers	42	16	5	21	86	88	−2	52 (Note: Soham Town Rangers were deducted one point.)	
16	Warboys Town	42	16	4	22	71	78	−7	52	
17	Diss Town	42	13	10	19	64	76	−12	49	
18	Bury Town	42	13	8	21	58	71	−13	47	
19	Harwich & Parkeston	42	12	7	23	61	85	−24	43	
20	Watton United	42	7	7	28	44	126	−82	28	
21	Clacton Town	42	6	8	28	46	140	−94	26	Relegated to Division One
22	Tiptree United	42	3	8	31	46	123	−77	17	Relegated to Division One

Source: fchd
Rules for classification: 1) points; 2) goal difference; 3) number of goals scored.

== Division One ==
Eastern Counties Football League Division One
- Season: 1997–98
- Champions: Ipswich Wanderers
- Promoted: Ipswich Wanderers; Maldon Town
- Matches: 306
- Goals: 984 (3.22 per match)

Division One featured 16 clubs which competed in the division last season, along with two new clubs, relegated from the Premier Division:

- Hadleigh United
- March Town United

=== League table ===
Pos	Team	Pld	W	D	L	GF	GA	GD	Pts	Promotion
1	Ipswich Wanderers	34	29	2	3	100	35	+65	89	Promoted to the Premier Division
2	Maldon Town	34	26	2	6	84	29	+55	80	Promoted to the Premier Division
3	Swaffham Town	34	21	7	6	67	26	+41	70	
4	Needham Market	34	17	7	10	53	39	+14	58	
5	Stanway Rovers	34	16	9	9	64	37	+27	57	
6	Cambridge City reserves	34	16	8	10	63	44	+19	56	Resigned from the league
7	Chatteris Town	34	16	8	10	56	53	+3	56	
8	Norwich United	34	16	3	15	51	46	+5	51	
9	Whitton United	34	14	8	12	66	55	+11	50	
10	Haverhill Rovers	34	14	7	13	54	56	−2	49	
11	Mildenhall Town	34	10	12	12	46	57	−11	42	
12	Downham Town	34	10	7	17	50	72	−22	37	
13	Thetford Town	34	9	5	20	47	74	−27	32	
14	Cornard United	34	8	8	18	41	71	−30	32	
15	March Town United	34	7	7	20	34	75	−41	28	
16	Hadleigh United	34	6	8	20	32	60	−28	26	
17	Brightlingsea United	34	5	7	22	30	67	−37	22	
18	Somersham Town	34	4	9	21	46	88	−42	21	

Source: fchd
Rules for classification: 1) points; 2) goal difference; 3) number of goals scored.
