= 2008–09 Eastern Counties Football League =

The 2008–09 season was the 67th in the history of the Eastern Counties Football League, a football league in England.

Lowestoft Town were champions, winning their twelfth Eastern Counties Football League title and were promoted to the Isthmian League for the first time in their history.

== Premier Division ==
Eastern Counties Football League Premier Division
- Season: 2008–09
- Champions: Lowestoft Town
- Promoted: Lowestoft Town
- Matches: 420
- Goals: 1,541 (3.67 per match)

The Premier Division featured 18 clubs which competed in the division last season, along with four new clubs:

- Ely City, promoted from Division One
- Tiptree United, promoted from Division One
- Whitton United, promoted from Division One
- Wivenhoe Town, relegated from the Isthmian League

=== League table ===
Pos	Team	Pld	W	D	L	GF	GA	GD	Pts	Promotion or relegation
1	Lowestoft Town	40	32	4	4	114	46	+68	100	Promoted to the Isthmian League
2	Cambridge Regional College	40	26	5	9	86	54	+32	83	
3	Needham Market	40	26	3	11	94	64	+30	81	
4	Dereham Town	40	25	4	11	108	67	+41	79	
5	Wroxham	40	24	6	10	86	52	+34	78	
6	Kirkley & Pakefield	40	23	7	10	78	44	+34	76	
7	Leiston	40	22	9	9	90	41	+49	75	
8	Tiptree United	40	20	5	15	90	72	+18	65	Transferred to the Essex Senior League
9	Stanway Rovers	40	19	7	14	81	65	+16	64	
10	Walsham-le-Willows	40	15	9	16	60	62	−2	54	
11	Mildenhall Town	40	16	5	19	75	81	−6	53	
12	Felixstowe & Walton United	40	16	1	23	75	110	−35	49	
13	Histon reserves	40	14	6	20	77	88	−11	48	
14	Ely City	40	12	6	22	59	82	−23	42	
15	King's Lynn reserves	40	11	8	21	57	81	−24	41	
16	Wisbech Town	40	11	6	23	59	82	−23	39	
17	Wivenhoe Town	40	12	2	26	65	105	−40	38	
18	Woodbridge Town	40	9	10	21	52	77	−25	37	
19	Norwich United	40	8	10	22	46	74	−28	34	
20	Harwich & Parkeston	40	9	6	25	47	98	−51	33	
21	Haverhill Rovers	40	7	7	26	42	96	−54	28	
22	Whitton United	0	0	0	0	0	0	0	0	Record expunged, demoted to Division One (Note: Whitton United withdrawn from the league in January 2009, their record was expunged. The club was admitted to Division One for the next season.)

Source: fchd
Rules for classification: 1) points; 2) goal difference; 3) number of goals scored.

== Division One ==
Eastern Counties Football League Division One
- Season: 2008–09
- Champions: Newmarket Town
- Promoted: Debenham LC; Hadleigh United; Newmarket Town
- Matches: 380
- Goals: 1,326 (3.49 per match)

Division One featured 16 clubs which competed in the division last season, along with four new clubs:

- Brantham Athletic, joined from the Suffolk and Ipswich League
- Ipswich Wanderers, relegated from the Premier Division
- Newmarket Town, relegated from the Premier Division
- Swaffham Town, relegated from the Premier Division

=== League table ===
Pos	Team	Pld	W	D	L	GF	GA	GD	Pts	Promotion
1	Newmarket Town	38	29	4	5	85	29	+56	91	Promoted to the Premier Division
2	Hadleigh United	38	26	4	8	79	40	+39	82	Promoted to the Premier Division
3	Debenham LC	38	25	3	10	91	36	+55	78	Promoted to the Premier Division
4	Halstead Town	38	23	9	6	97	47	+50	78	
5	Great Yarmouth Town	38	22	7	9	79	46	+33	73	
6	Gorleston	38	21	8	9	87	59	+28	71	
7	Clacton	38	22	4	12	97	58	+39	70	
8	Brantham Athletic	38	20	6	12	81	57	+24	66	
9	Diss Town	38	17	8	13	78	63	+15	59	
10	Godmanchester Rovers	38	15	7	16	58	57	+1	52	
11	Cornard United	38	14	8	16	62	63	−1	50	
12	Stowmarket Town	38	13	11	14	52	67	−15	50	
13	March Town United	38	13	6	19	62	74	−12	45	
14	Saffron Walden Town	38	10	14	14	48	51	−3	44	
15	Downham Town	38	9	7	22	48	95	−47	34	
16	Thetford Town	38	9	6	23	55	84	−29	33	
17	Ipswich Wanderers	38	7	8	23	57	84	−27	29	
18	Swaffham Town	38	7	6	25	38	102	−64	27	
19	Long Melford	38	6	5	27	33	104	−71	23	
20	Fakenham Town	38	4	5	29	39	110	−71	17	

Source: fchd
Rules for classification: 1) points; 2) goal difference; 3) number of goals scored.
