= 1998–99 Eastern Counties Football League =

The 1998–99 season was the 57th in the history of Eastern Counties Football League a football competition in England.

Wroxham were champions for the third season in a row, winning their sixth Eastern Counties Football League title.

== Premier Division ==
Eastern Counties Football League Premier Division
- Season: 1998–99
- Champions: Wroxham
- Relegated: Ely City
- Matches: 462
- Goals: 1,425 (3.08 per match)

The Premier Division featured 20 clubs which competed in the division last season, along with two new clubs, promoted from Division One:

- Ipswich Wanderers
- Maldon Town

=== League table ===
Pos	Team	Pld	W	D	L	GF	GA	GD	Pts	Promotion or relegation
1	Wroxham	42	27	10	5	88	36	+52	91	
2	Fakenham Town	42	25	10	7	96	50	+46	85	
3	Great Yarmouth Town	42	23	9	10	69	36	+33	78	
4	Histon	42	19	17	6	80	53	+27	74	
5	Lowestoft Town	42	19	12	11	78	53	+25	69	
6	Felixstowe Port & Town	42	20	9	13	78	56	+22	69	
7	Soham Town Rangers	42	19	12	11	77	73	+4	69	
8	Newmarket Town	42	19	11	12	70	55	+15	68	
9	Sudbury Town	42	20	8	14	75	67	+8	68	Clubs merged to AFC Sudbury
10	Sudbury Wanderers	42	17	8	17	72	62	+10	59	Clubs merged to AFC Sudbury
11	Bury Town	42	15	14	13	47	46	+1	59	
12	Diss Town	42	14	15	13	54	59	−5	57	
13	Maldon Town	42	16	8	18	69	69	0	56	
14	Halstead Town	42	14	11	17	59	71	−12	53	
15	Warboys Town	42	14	10	18	70	88	−18	52	
16	Stowmarket Town	42	12	11	19	59	72	−13	47	
17	Gorleston	42	12	10	20	52	78	−26	46	
18	Harwich & Parkeston	42	9	14	19	42	63	−21	41	
19	Woodbridge Town	42	9	11	22	49	73	−24	38	
20	Watton United	42	9	10	23	53	83	−30	37	
21	Ipswich Wanderers	42	5	13	24	49	82	−33	28	
22	Ely City	42	3	11	28	39	100	−61	20	Relegated to Division One

Source: fchd
Rules for classification: 1) points; 2) goal difference; 3) number of goals scored.

== Division One ==
Eastern Counties Football League Division One
- Season: 1998–99
- Champions: Clacton Town
- Promoted: Clacton Town; Mildenhall Town
- Matches: 306
- Goals: 974 (3.18 per match)

Division One featured 15 clubs which competed in the division last season, along with three new clubs:

- Clacton Town, relegated from the Premier Division
- Dereham Town, joined from the Anglian Combination
- Tiptree United, relegated from the Premier Division

=== League table ===
Pos	Team	Pld	W	D	L	GF	GA	GD	Pts	Promotion
1	Clacton Town	34	22	9	3	92	26	+66	75	Promoted to the Premier Division
2	Mildenhall Town	34	21	8	5	79	26	+53	71	Promoted to the Premier Division
3	Downham Town	34	21	4	9	65	47	+18	67	
4	Tiptree United	34	20	5	9	76	46	+30	65	
5	Needham Market	34	18	7	9	78	43	+35	61	
6	Swaffham Town	34	18	7	9	56	35	+21	61	
7	Dereham Town	34	17	7	10	62	41	+21	58	
8	Chatteris Town	34	16	6	12	51	51	0	54	
9	Cornard United	34	14	11	9	49	42	+7	53	
10	Whitton United	34	13	9	12	52	57	−5	48	
11	Stanway Rovers	34	11	10	13	43	48	−5	43	
12	Haverhill Rovers	34	9	11	14	38	54	−16	38	
13	Norwich United	34	10	6	18	38	59	−21	36	
14	Brightlingsea United	34	7	11	16	53	68	−15	32	
15	March Town United	34	8	6	20	43	71	−28	30	
16	Hadleigh United	34	7	3	24	34	79	−45	24	
17	Somersham Town	34	5	8	21	33	87	−54	23	
18	Thetford Town	34	3	4	27	32	94	−62	13	

Source: fchd
Rules for classification: 1) points; 2) goal difference; 3) number of goals scored.
