= 2014–15 FA Youth Cup =

Tournament details
- Teams: 456

Final positions
- Champions: Chelsea (6th Title)
- Runners-up: Manchester City (5th Runner Up Finish)

Tournament statistics
- Top goal scorer: (England) Dominic Solanke Chelsea (10 Goals)

The 2014–15 FA Youth Cup was the 63rd edition of the FA Youth Cup.

Chelsea defended the title, beating Manchester City in the final.

== Calendar ==
Round	Matches played from	Matches	Clubs
Preliminary round	8 September 2014	87	456 → 369
First round qualifying	22 September 2014	140	369 → 229
Second round qualifying	6 October 2014	70	229 → 159
Third round qualifying	20 October 2014	35	159 → 124
First round	22 October 2014	40	124 → 84
Second round	11 November 2014	20	84 → 64
Third round	2 December 2014	32	64 → 32
Fourth round	8 January 2015	16	32 → 16
Fifth round	27 January 2015	8	16 → 8
Quarter-finals	16 February 2015	4	8 → 4
Semi-finals (two legs)	7/21 March 2015	4	4 → 2
Final (two legs)	20/27 April 2015	2	2 → 1

== Preliminary round ==
Tie no	Home team	Score	Away team	Attendance
1	Shildon	2–3	Seaham Red Star	
2	Chester-Le-Street Town	2–1	Newton Aycliffe	
3	Altrincham	3–0	Colne	71
4	Irlam	15–0	Glossop North End	100
5	Curzon Ashton	2–1	Runcorn Linnets	215
6	Chester	2–1	Prescott Cables	336
7	Macclesfield Town	3–1	FC United of Manchester	
8	Hyde	1–2	Ashton Athletic	
9	Ossett Town	1–3	Staveley MW	49
10	AFC Emley	W/O	Sheffield	N/A
11	Hall Road Rangers	2 –1†	Harrogate Town	
12	Silsden	1–5	Barton Town Old Boys	38
13	Thackley	1–9	Handsworth Parramore	87
14	North Ferriby United	0–2	Guiseley	69
15	Anstey Nomads	2–3	Matlock Town	63
16	Blaby & Whetstone Athletic	W/O	Loughborough Dynamo	N/A
17	Ilkeston	W/O	Thurnby Nirvana	N/A
18	Aylestone Park	1–2†	Retford United	51
19	Holwell Sports	0–7	Gresley	35
20	Coleshill Town	2–0	Lchfield City	104
21	Worcester City	4–1	Pegasus Juniors	46
22	Solihull Moors	2–1	Stourbridge	101
23	Wednesfield	2–0	Rugby Town	
24	Wolverhampton Casuals	0–2	Newcastle Town	69
25	Leamington	2–1	Sutton Coldfield Town	35
Tie awarded to Sutton Coldfield Town.
26	Bilston Town	4–1	Tividale	
27	Malvern Town	0–6	Herford United	
28	Felixstowe & Walton United	0–4	Dereham Town	52
29	Newmarket Town	2–0	Walsham Le Willows	53
30	Gorleston	1–3	Woodbridge Town	51
31	Ipswich Wanderers	4–4	Fakenham Town	
Fakenham Town advance 4–3 on penalties.
32	Mildenhall Town	4–2	Hadleigh United	51
33	Stowmarket Town	4–0	Soham Town Rangers	39
34	Whitton United	W/O	Haverhill Rovers	N/A
35	AFC Dunstable	1–2	AFC Rushden & Diamonds	56
36	AFC Kempston Rovers	W/O	Wellingborough Town	N/A
37	Bedford	0–2	Bugbrooke St Michaels	48
38	Rothwell Corinthians	1–2	Brackley Town	74
39	Barkingside	1–2	Clapton	
40	East Thurrock United	4–2	Witham Town	91
41	Cockfosters	2–3	Codicote	45
42	Billericay Town	3–4†	Tower Hamlets	35
43	Brentwood Town	2–2	Burnham Ramblers	
Brentwood Town advance 4–3 on penalties.

Tie no	Home team	Score	Away team	Attendance
44	Canvey Island	1–3	Cheshunt	77
45	Fisher	W/O	Halstead Town	N/A
46	Royston Town	4–1	Romford	45
47	Potters Bar Town	4–0	Braintree Town	58
48	Stanway Rovers	0–1	Redbridge	56
49	Concord Rangers	3–1	St Albans City	57
50	Hullbridge Sports	0–8	Hitchin Town	
51	Wealdstone	6–0	Chesham United	
52	Leverstock Green	W/O	Oxhey Jets	N/A
53	Hayes & Yeading United	3–0	Hampton & Richmond Borough	67
54	AFC Hayes	2–4	Corinthian Casuals	24
55	Buckingham Athletic	2–2	Hanworth Villa	58
Hanworth Villa advance 5–4 on penalties.
56	Lordswood	W/O	Margate	N/A
57	Tooting & Mitcham United	1–6	Folkestone Invicta	96
58	Tonbridge Angels	0–3	Dartford	92
59	Herne Bay	3–1	Chatham Town	86
60	Greenwich Borough	3–2†	Dover Athletic	160
61	Lingfield	2–3	VCD Athletic	49
62	Dulwich Hamlet	9–0	East Grinstead Town	
63	Bromley	3–0	Cray Valley PM	126
64	Crawley Down Gatwick	3–0	Mile Oak	43
65	Walton & Hersham	5–2	Haywards Heath Town	23
66	Pagham	5–1	Saltdean United	55
67	Arundel	0–4	Farnham Town	63
68	Knaphill	3–3	Littlehampton Town	
Littlehampton Town advance 4–3 on penalties.
69	Lewes	9–0	Chichester City	76
70	Woking	7–0	Horsham	85
71	Aldershot Town	1–1	Oxford City	78
Oxford City advance 5–4 on penalties.
72	Cove Rangers	W/O	Kidlington	N/A
73	Windsor	0–3	Maidenhead United	62
74	Burnham	2–3	Thatcham Town	48
75	Hartley Wintney	1–0	Basingstoke Town	
76	Christchurch	6–0	Gillingham Town	77
77	Sholing	3–0	AFC Portchester	
78	Petersfield Town	W/O	Salisbury City	N/A
79	Bemerton Heath Harlquins	0–7	Moneyfields	
80	Ringwood	0–5	Wimborne Town	38
81	Gloucester City	1–0	Bristol Rovers	79
82	Chippenham Town	W/O	Merthyr Town	N/A
83	Bristol Manor Farm	2–7	Yate Town	87
84	Weston Super Mare	8–0	Brislington	26
85	Torquay United	9–0	Clevedon Town	
86	Larkhall Athletic	0–4	Bath City	77
87	Wells City	4–3	Tiverton Town	

Notes:

- † = After Extra Time

== First qualifying round ==
Tie no	Home team	Score	Away team	Attendance
1	Chester-Le-Street Town	4–0	Ryton & Crawcrook Albion	
2	Newcastle Benfield	10–2	Consett	102
3	Seaham Red Star	W/O	Sunderland RCA	N/A
4	Darlington 1883	3–0	Gateshead	73
5	Marine	4–1	Ashton Town	73
6	Ashton Athletic	2–1	Daisy Hill	52
7	Lancaster City	3–5†	Nantwich Town	45
8	Vauxhall Motors	4–2	Padiham	62
9	AFC Fylde	5–3	Witton Albion	133
10	Salford City	2–2†	Southport	102
Southport advance 5–4 on penalties.
11	Bootle	0–1	Abbey Hey	97
12	Curzon Ashton	1–2	Clitheroe	226
13	AFC Blackpool	0–5	Skelmersdale United	
14	Widnes Vikings	W/O	Chester	N/A
15	Macclesfield Town	1–2	Warrington Town	
16	Wrexham	6–0	West Didsbury & Chorlton	62
17	Altrincham	1–2	Irlam	125
18	Staveley MW	2–0	Handsworth Parramore	85
19	FC Halifax Town	6–1	Hall Road Rangers	143
20	Pontefract Collieries	1–4	Nostell MW	
21	Farsley	1–2	Stocksbridge Park Steels	43
22	Hemsworth MW	0–4	Knaresborough Town	60
23	Goole	0–2	Barton Town Old Boys	45
24	Brighouse Town	3–3†	Guiseley	
Brighouse Town advance 4–3 on penalties.
25	Ossett Albion	0–3	Sheffield	60
26	Grimsby Town	4–2†	Selby Town	91
27	Matlock Town	1–0	Gresley	58
28	Basford United	1–0	Ilkeston	167
29	Heanor Town	1–2†	Grantham Town	86
30	Arnold Town	W/O	Lincoln City	N/A
31	Boston United	5–2	Teversal	186
32	Mickleover Sports	0–3	Retford United	46
33	Stamford	0–3	Oadby Town	31
34	Dunkirk	2–1	Loughborough Dynamo	49
35	St Andrews	5–3	Long Eaton United	42
36	Tipton Town	0–4	Kidderminster Harriers	
37	Chasetown	3–4	Ellesmere Rangers	
38	Sutton Coldfield Town	1–5†	Coventry Sphinx	40
39	Nuneaton Town	5–0	Racing Club Warwick	70
40	Lye Town	1–11	Stratford Town	37
41	AFC Wulfrunians	1–1†	Boldmere St Michaels	
Boldmere St Michaels advance 4–3 on penalties.
42	Coleshill Town	2–1	Newcastle Town	45
43	Eccleshall	1–2	Solihull Moors	77
44	Bedworth United	1–5	Worcester City	47
45	Romulus	4–1	Dudley Sports	
46	Wednesfield	1–4	Hereford United	15
47	Nuneaton Griff	0–6	Bilston Town	62
48	Swaffham Town	3–5	AFC Sudbury	67
49	Wroxham	4–0	Newmarket Town	
50	Cornard United	0–11	Woodbridge Town	59
51	Fakenham Town	6–1	Long Melford	57
52	Histon	1–0	Bury Town	112
53	Kirkley & Pakefield	4–3	Mildenhall Town	
54	Dereham Town	5–2	Brantham Athletic	
55	Lowestoft Town	0–6	Needham Market	39
56	Norwich United	0–2	Great Yarmouth Town	38
57	Haverhill Rovers	3–2†	Stowmarket Town	58
58	St Neots Town	3–4	Brackley Town	67
59	Bugbrooke St Michaels	5–0	AFC Rushden & Diamonds	
60	Peterborough Sports	W/O	Barton Rovers	N/A
61	Wellingborough Whitworths	0–2	Peterborough Northern Star	
62	St Ives Town	2–5†	Godmanchester Rovers	83
63	Cogenhoe United	2–0	Wellingborough Town	
64	Yaxley	2–4	Corby Town	
65	Bowers & Pitsea	2–4	Royston Town	51
66	Great Wakering Rovers	0–10	Chelmsford City	165
67	Potters Bar Town	5–1	Cheshunt	38
68	Brightlingsea Regent	0–1	Enfield Town	54
69	Sawbridgeworth Town	2–4	FC Clacton	80
70	Codicote	3–1	Barking	38

Tie no	Home team	Score	Away team	Attendance
71	Waltham Abbey	3–1	Saffron Walden Town	
72	Bishop's Stortford	1–2	Hitchin Town	92
73	Tilbury	1–3	Barnet	96
74	Thurrock	2–2†	Boreham Wood	
Boreham Wood advance 4–3 on penalties.
75	Tower Hamlets	5–1	Aveley	86
76	East Thurrock United	4–2	Grays Athletic	79
77	AFC Hornchurch	W/O	Heybridge Swifts	N/A
78	Redbridge	1–1†	Concord Rangers	
Concord Rangers advance 5–4 on penalties.
79	Ware	3–5†	Fisher	60
80	Clapton	0–6	Brentwood Town	25
81	Wealdstone	7–0	Hanworth Villa	58
82	Bedfont Sports	2–3	Hayes & Yeading United	
83	Northwood	5–3†	Tring Athletic	59
84	Ashford Town (Middx)	1–6	Metropolitan Police	57
85	Kings Langley	1–7	Harefield United	
86	Uxbridge	4–2	Corinthian Casuals	
87	Wingate & Finchley	2–1	Newport Pagnell Town	51
88	North Greenford United	0–5	Leverstock Green	30
89	Berkhamsted	1–3	Staines Town	32
90	Corinthian	1–3	Welling United	121
91	Greenwich Borough	1–5	Thamesmead Town	158
92	Eastbourne Borough	2–0	Ramsgate	112
93	Bromley	9–0	Faversham Town	94
94	Folkestone Invicta	0–4	Ebbsfleet United	
95	Hastings United	4–1†	Holmesdale	80
96	Croydon	6–1	Whitstable Town	57
97	Eastbourne United	1–7	Colliers Wood United	50
98	Carshalton Athletic	1–3	Maidstone United	81
99	Eastbourne Town	1–3	Erith & Belvedere	22
100	Dartford	4–1	Margate	115
101	Herne Bay	3–0	VCD Athletic	69
102	Phoenix Sports	0–7	Sutton United	49
103	Dulwich Hamlet	3–0	Chipstead	
104	Newhaven	1–3	Bognor Regis Town	
105	Lewes	2–1	Raynes Park Vale	87
106	Redhill	2–10	Woking	57
107	Camberley Town	2–0	South Park	46
108	Leatherhead	4–1	Horley Town	29
109	Three Bridges	4–4†	Westfield	53
Westfield advance 6–4 on penalties.
110	Burgess Hill Town	7–1	Shoreham	
111	Pagham	3–0	Molesey	68
112	Kingstonian	4–0	Peacehaven & Telscombe	
113	Guildford City	0–1	Farnham Town	57
114	Littlehampton Town	11–1	Dorking	63
115	Worthing	0–2	Whyteleafe	58
116	Crawley Down Gatwick	0–3	Walton & Hersham	36
117	Thatcham Town	3–4	Bracknell Town	
118	Maidenhead United	6–1	Hartley Wintney	
119	Farnborough	1–7	Didcot Town	
120	Marlow	2–1	Slough Town	
121	Binfield	1–0†	Thame United	47
122	Oxford City	7–1	Alton Town	70
123	Andover Town	W/O	Fleet Town	N/A
124	Ascot United	2–1	Kidlington	
125	Poole Town	6–1	Moneyfields	77
126	Petersfield Town	3–4†	Christchurch	
127	Team Solent	W/O	Wimborne Town	N/A
128	Romsey Town	0–6	Havant & Waterlooville	50
129	Hamworthy United	W/O	Dorchester Town	N/A
130	Bournemouth	1–0	Sholing	32
131	AFC Totton	1–2†	Eastleigh	174
132	Chippenham Town	W/O	Mangotsfield United	N/A
133	Pewsey Vale	3–4	Yate Town	
134	Gloucester City	4–1	New College Swindon	71
135	Cirencester Town	1–0	Forest Green Rovers	79
136	Weston Super Mare	3–0	Ashton & Backwell United	55
137	Hengrove Athletic	1–2	Wells City	30
138	Torquay United	6–2	Willand Rovers	
139	Elmore	3–9	Taunton Town	62
140	Paulton Rovers	0–2	Bath City	159

Notes:

- † = After Extra Time

== Second qualifying round ==
Tie no	Home team	Score	Away team	Attendance
1	Seaham Red Star	2–1	Darlington 1883	101
2	Newcastle Benfield	4–1	Chester-Le-Street Town	110
3	Grimsby Town	6–0	Vauxhall Motors	
4	Marine	4–2	Nostell MW	
5	FC Halifax Town	1–2	Stocksbridge Park Steels	125
6	Nantwich Town	3–2†	Staveley MW	
7	Knaresborough Town	1–0	Sheffield	
8	Wrexham	0–2	Ashton Athletic	84
9	Chester	3–5	Irlam	
10	Skelmersdale United	3–2	Warrington Town	
11	Abbey Hey	3–1	Barton Town Old Boys	
12	AFC Fylde	5–3	Brighouse Town	98
13	Clitheroe	0–2	Southport	190
14	Matlock Town	0–2	Boston United	75
15	Oadby Town	2–1†	St Andrews	96
16	Grantham Town	2–1	Dunkirk	70
17	Lincoln City	2–0	Corby Town	49
18	Basford United	5–2	Retford United	81
19	Coleshill Town	3–0	Romulus	35
20	Bilston Town	2–1	Hereford United	
21	Ellesmere Rangers	2–1†	Boldmere St Michaels	
22	Worcester City	3–4	Stratford Town	58
23	Nuneaton Town	3–1	Coventry Sphinx	70
24	Kidderminster Harriers	6–1	Solihull Moors	
25	AFC Sudbury	1–0	Histon	77
26	Dereham Town	3–6	Great Yarmouth Town	51
27	Woodbridge Town	0–3	Needham Market	62
28	Fakenham Town	3–1	Haverhill Rovers	
29	Wroxham	6–1	Kirkley & Pakefield	40
30	Peterborough Northern Star	5–0	Godmanchester Rovers	53
31	Brackley Town	2–2†	Bugbrooke St Michaels	
Brackley Town advance 7–6 on penalties.
32	Barton Rovers	7–2	Cogenhoe United	52
33	Brentwood Town	2–2†	Tower Hamlets	95
Brentwood Town advance 4–3 on penalties.
34	Codicote	1–0	Enfield Town	
35	Boreham Wood	2–4	Potters Bar Town	79

Tie no	Home team	Score	Away team	Attendance
36	Concord Rangers	0–2	Fisher	63
37	Hitchin Town	1–3	Chelmsford City	102
38	Barnet	11–1	FC Clacton	116
39	Royston Town	3–2	East Thurrock United	55
40	Waltham Abbey	1–6	AFC Hornchurch	
41	Wealdstone	2–1	Harefield United	
42	Wingate & Finchley	0–4	Staines Town	
43	Northwood	3–7	Leverstock Green	82
44	Metropolitan Police	8–2	Marlow	57
45	Hayes & Yeading United	5–2	Uxbridge	
46	Bromley	4–4†	Eastbourne Borough	84
Eastbourne Borough advance 4–1 on penalties.
47	Herne Bay	4–0	Erith & Belvedere	62
48	Dulwich Hamlet	1–3	Ebbsfleet United	73
49	Croydon	1–3	Thamesmead Town	74
50	Maidstone United	1–1†	Sutton United	124
Sutton United advance 4–2 on penalties.
51	Hastings United	2–3	Dartford	67
52	Colliers Wood United	0–2	Welling United	65
53	Wimborne Town	2–0	Fleet Town	24
54	Leatherhead	4–0	Littlehampton Town	78
55	Burgess Hill Town	0–5	Woking	90
56	Ascot United	6–2	Whyteleafe	52
57	Poole Town	3–0	Chippenham Town	62
58	Walton & Hersham	2–3	Bournemouth	34
59	Oxford City	2–1†	Farnham Town	98
60	Didcot Town	4–0	Binfield	
61	Maidenhead United	4–3	Bognor Regis Town	42
62	Pagham	0–4	Havant & Waterlooville	62
63	Christchurch	1–0	Hamworthy United	122
64	Westfield	0–5	Lewes	37
65	Camberley Town	0–2	Bracknell Town	46
66	Kingstonian	0–6	Eastleigh	44
67	Gloucester City	4–0	Taunton Town	
68	Wells City	0–2	Cirencester Town	
69	Weston Super Mare	5–0	Yate Town	44
70	Bath City	0–3	Torquay United	59

Notes:

- † = After Extra Time

== Third qualifying round ==
Tie no	Home team	Score	Away team	Attendance
1	Marine	0–4	Nantwich Town	93
2	AFC Fylde	4–1	Irlam	114
3	Grimsby Town	1–1†	Abbey Hey	
Abbey Hey advance 4–2 on penalties.
4	Stocksbridge Park Steels	3–2	Skelmersdale United	117
5	Seaham Red Star	4–1	Ashton Athletic	86
6	Newcastle Benfield	2–2†	Southport	
Newcastle Benfield advance 13–12 on penalties.
7	Lincoln City	1–0†	Oadby Town	117
8	Knaresborough Town	2–0	Brackley Town	
9	Basford United	1–3	Boston United	108
10	Peterborough Northern Star	3–1	Grantham Town	
11	Nuneaton Town	0–5	Stratford Town	70
12	Kidderminster Harriers	6–1	Coleshill Town	111
13	Ellesmere Rangers	2–0	Bilston Town	
14	Wroxham	1–2†	Fakenham Town	
15	Barton Rovers	0–2	AFC Sudbury	
16	Needham Market	3–0	Great Yarmouth Town	102
17	Fisher	1–10	Barnet	83
18	Leverstock Green	2–1	AFC Hornchurch	

Tie no	Home team	Score	Away team	Attendance
19	Potters Bar Town	8–5	Staines Town	33
20	Chelmsford City	1–4	Wealdstone	123
21	Brentwood Town	0–2	Royston Town	80
22	Codicote	1–4	Metropolitan Police	
23	Thamesmead Town	1–0	Herne Bay	58
24	Hayes & Yeading United	1–4	Welling United	
25	Sutton United	0–2	Eastbourne Borough	129
26	Dartford	1–0	Ebbsfleet United	272
27	Christchurch	4–3	Havant & Waterlooville	93
28	Poole Town	2–0	Woking	107
29	Didcot Town	4–3	Leatherhead	
30	Bracknell Town	1–2	Wimborne Town	68
31	Eastleigh	3–2†	Ascot United	166
32	Maidenhead United	5–2	Lewes	42
33	Bournemouth	0–7	Oxford City	56
34	Gloucester City	1–2	Torquay United	
35	Weston Super Mare	3–1	Cirencester Town	

Notes:

- † = After Extra Time

== First round ==
Tie no	Home team	Score	Away team	Attendance
1	Bury	6–1	Seaham Red Star	137
2	Scunthorpe United	1–3	Bradford City	201
3	Sheffield United	3–1	Hartlepool United	413
4	Crewe Alexandra	2–2†	Preston North End	385
Crewe Alexandra advance 3–0 on penalties.
5	AFC Fylde	2–1	Newcastle Benfield	77
6	Doncaster Rovers	3–1	Morecambe	321
7	Fleetwood Town	1–0	Accrington Stanley	139
8	Carlisle United	1–2	Barnsley	167
9	Rochdale	9–0	Nantwich Town	267
10	Abbey Hey	0–2†	York City	120
11	Oldham Athletic	1–2	Tranmere Rovers	179
12	Chesterfield	4–1	Stocksbridge Park Steels	250
13	Knaresborough Town	0–1	Northampton Town	215
14	Coventry City	3–0	Peterborough Northern Star	143
15	Walsall	1–2	Burton Albion	161
16	Peterborough United	2–0	Notts County	717
17	Stratford Town	1–3	Kidderminster Harriers	104
18	Cambridge United	2–5	MK Dons	110
19	Shresbury Town	7–0	Lincoln City	129
20	Mansfield Town	2–2†	Boston United	176
Mansfield Town advance 3–2 on penalties.

Tie no	Home team	Score	Away team	Attendance
21	Ellesmere Rangers	1–2†	Port Vale	347
22	Gillingham	4–1	Eastleigh	152
23	Wealdstone	2–1	Dagenham & Redbridge	125
24	Royston Town	2–0	AFC Sudbury	86
25	Southend United	6–0	Leverstock Green	383
26	Eastbourne Borough	0–3	Maidenhead United	70
27	Stevenage	4–3	Needham Market	255
28	Fakenham Town	0–7	AFC Wimbledon	216
29	Leyton Orient	1–3	Colchester United	355
30	Potters Bar Town	1–2†	Welling United	43
31	Dartford	3–4	Thamesmead Town	224
32	Barnet	2–0	Metropolitan Police	130
33	Luton Town	4–1	Didcot Town	254
34	Cheltenham Town	4–0	Weston Super Mare	146
35	Oxford United	2–1	Bristol City	260
36	Poole Town	1–2	Torquay United	173
37	Christchurch	0–5	Swindon Town	147
38	Plymouth Argyle	0–4	Portsmouth	401
39	Oxford City	3–2	Wimborne Town	71
40	Exeter City	1–2	Newport County	252

Notes:

- † = After Extra Time

== Second round ==
Tie no	Home team	Score	Away team	Attendance
1	AFC Fylde	1–4	Chesterfield	127
2	Doncaster Rovers	4–2	Peterborough United	214
3	Mansfield Town	3–0	Northampton Town	125
4	Bradford City	2–0	Barnsley	359
5	Tranmere Rovers	3–1†	Shrewsbury Town	277
6	Port Vale	3–4†	Bury	207
7	Burton Albion	0–1	Kidderminster Harriers	190
8	Fleetwood Town	3–1	Sheffield United	226
9	Rochdale	3–4	Coventry City	223
10	Crewe Alexandra	4–0	York City	399

Tie no	Home team	Score	Away team	Attendance
11	Southend United	1–0	Barnet	382
12	Maidenhead United	2–2†	Torquay United	228
Torquay United advance 4–2 on penalties.
13	Oxford City	2–1	Luton Town	166
14	Gillingham	1–2	AFC Wimbledon	155
15	Thamesmead Town	3–7	Portsmouth	150
16	Newport County	4–5†	MK Dons	430
17	Oxford United	3–2	Swindon Town	727
18	Stevenage	6–0	Wealdstone	294
19	Colchester United	2–1	Cheltenham Town	241
20	Royston Town	2–1	Welling United	74

Notes:

- † = After Extra Time

== Third round ==
Tie no	Home team	Score	Away team	Attendance
1	Mansfield Town	2–2†	Tranmere Rovers	147
Mansfield Town advance 5–4 on penalties.
2	Colchester United	0–0	Ipswich Town	588
Ipswich Town advance 4–2 on penalties.
3	Nottingham Forest	3–2†	MK Dons	384
4	Leicester City	1–0	Wigan Athletic	492
5	Oxford City	1–3	Royston Town	310
6	Arsenal	1–0	Reading	658
7	Huddersfield Town	2–0	Crystal Palace	190
8	Brighton & Hove Albion	0–2	Derby County	503
9	Portsmouth	0–1	Bolton Wanderers	367
10	Kidderminster Harriers	1–2	Blackpool	311
11	Tottenham Hotspur	4–1	Blackburn Rovers	266
12	Sunderland	4–0	Fleetwood Town	234
13	Leeds United	0–2	Chelsea	2,249
14	AFC Wimbledon	1–2	Burnley	598
15	Southampton	2–1	West Ham United	346

Tie no	Home team	Score	Away team	Attendance
16	Stevenage	1–2†	Everton	417
17	Doncaster Rovers	3–1†	Norwich City	318
18	Birmingham City	4–1	Queens Park Rangers	73
19	AFC Bournemouth	2–3†	Coventry City	313
20	Liverpool	2–0	Bradford City	236
21	Millwall	1–3	Newcastle United	507
22	Manchester City	2–0	Oxford United	476
23	Rotherham United	1–2	Wolverhampton Wanderers	403
24	Southend United	3–4†	Middlesbrough	485
25	Manchester United	1–0	Bury	2,131
26	Swansea City	3–1	Watford	230
27	Crewe Alexandra	2–1	Fulham	549
28	Sheffield Wednesday	0–5	Stoke City	393
29	Hull City	3–2†	Brentford	137
30	West Brom	8–1	Torquay United	203
31	Chesterfield	3–2	Aston Villa	537
32	Charlton Athletic	0–1	Cardiff City	535

Notes:

- † = After Extra Time

== Fourth round ==
Tie no	Home team	Score	Away team	Attendance
1	Burnley	3–1	Cardiff City	282
2	Crewe Alexandra	5–0	Bolton Wanderers	722
3	Chelsea	6–1	Huddersfield Town	301
4	Liverpool	5–2	Derby County	231
5	Leicester City	1–0	Chesterfield	506
6	West Brom	0–3	Nottingham Forest	371
7	Blackpool	1–2	Birmingham City	317
8	Manchester City	8–2	Coventry City	488

Tie no	Home team	Score	Away team	Attendance
9	Sunderland	3–1†	Ipswich Town	378
10	Everton	1–1†	Southampton	271
Southampton advance 5–4 on penalties.
11	Manchester United	3–0	Hull City	4,087
12	Arsenal	2–1	Royston Town	1,279
13	Middlesbrough	2–3	Newcastle United	939
14	Swansea City	2–1	Doncaster Rovers	312
15	Mansfield Town	0–3	Stoke City	337
16	Tottenham Hotspur	2–0	Wolverhampton Wanderers	527

Notes:

- † = After Extra Time

== Fifth round ==
Tie no	Home team	Score	Away team	Attendance
1	Arsenal	2–3	Crewe Alexandra	380
2	Nottingham Forest	2–0	Burnley	788
3	Liverpool	2–3	Birmingham City	306
4	Southampton	0–2	Leicester City	418

Tie no	Home team	Score	Away team	Attendance
5	Chelsea	6–0	Swansea City	227
6	Sunderland	0–0†	Newcastle United	1,733
Newcastle United advance 3–1 on penalties.
7	Tottenham Hotspur	3–1	Manchester United	2,408
8	Manchester City	1–0	Stoke City	906

Notes:

- † = After Extra Time

== Quarter-finals ==
Tie no	Home team	Score	Away team	Attendance
1	Leicester City	2–1	Birmingham City	1,696
2	Newcastle United	0–3	Chelsea	11,664

Tie no	Home team	Score	Away team	Attendance
3	Manchester City	6–1	Crewe Alexandra	1,416
4	Nottingham Forest	1–2	Tottenham Hotspur	4,053

Notes:

- † = After Extra Time

== Semi-finals ==
Team 1	Agg.	Team 2	1st leg	2nd leg
Manchester City	5–1	Leicester City	3–0	2–1
Tottenham Hotspur	4–5	Chelsea	2–0	2–5

=== First leg ===
5 March 2015
19:45

Tottenham Hotspur	2–0	Chelsea
Onomah 43'; Sterling 83'	Report

White Hart Lane, Tottenham
Attendance: 2,235

11 March 2015
19:00

Manchester City	3–0	Leicester City
Nemane 29', 90+2'; Boadu 34'	Report

Academy Stadium, Manchester
Attendance: 1,800
Referee: Tony Harrington

=== Second leg ===
18 March 2015
19:00

Chelsea	5–2	Tottenham Hotspur
Solanke 40', 51'; Brown 45'; Colkett 53', 71' (pen.)	Report	Harrison 31', 82' (pen.)

Stamford Bridge, Fulham
Attendance: 3,666

8 April 2015
19:45

Leicester City	1–2	Manchester City
Ndukwu 69' (pen.)	Report	Buckley-Ricketts 90'; Barker 90+5' (pen.)

King Power Stadium, Leicester
Attendance: 2,813
Referee: Gary Sutton

== Final ==
=== First leg ===
20 April 2015
19:45

Manchester City	1-3	Chelsea
Buckley-Ricketts 9'	Report	Abraham 7', 20'; Solanke 90'

Academy Stadium
Attendance: 6,421
Referee: Robert Madley

=== Second leg ===
27 April 2015
19:45

Chelsea	2–1	Manchester City
Brown 20'; Abraham 46'	Report	Iheanacho 6'

Stamford Bridge
Attendance: 10,969
Referee: Robert Madley

Chelsea won 5–2 on aggregate.

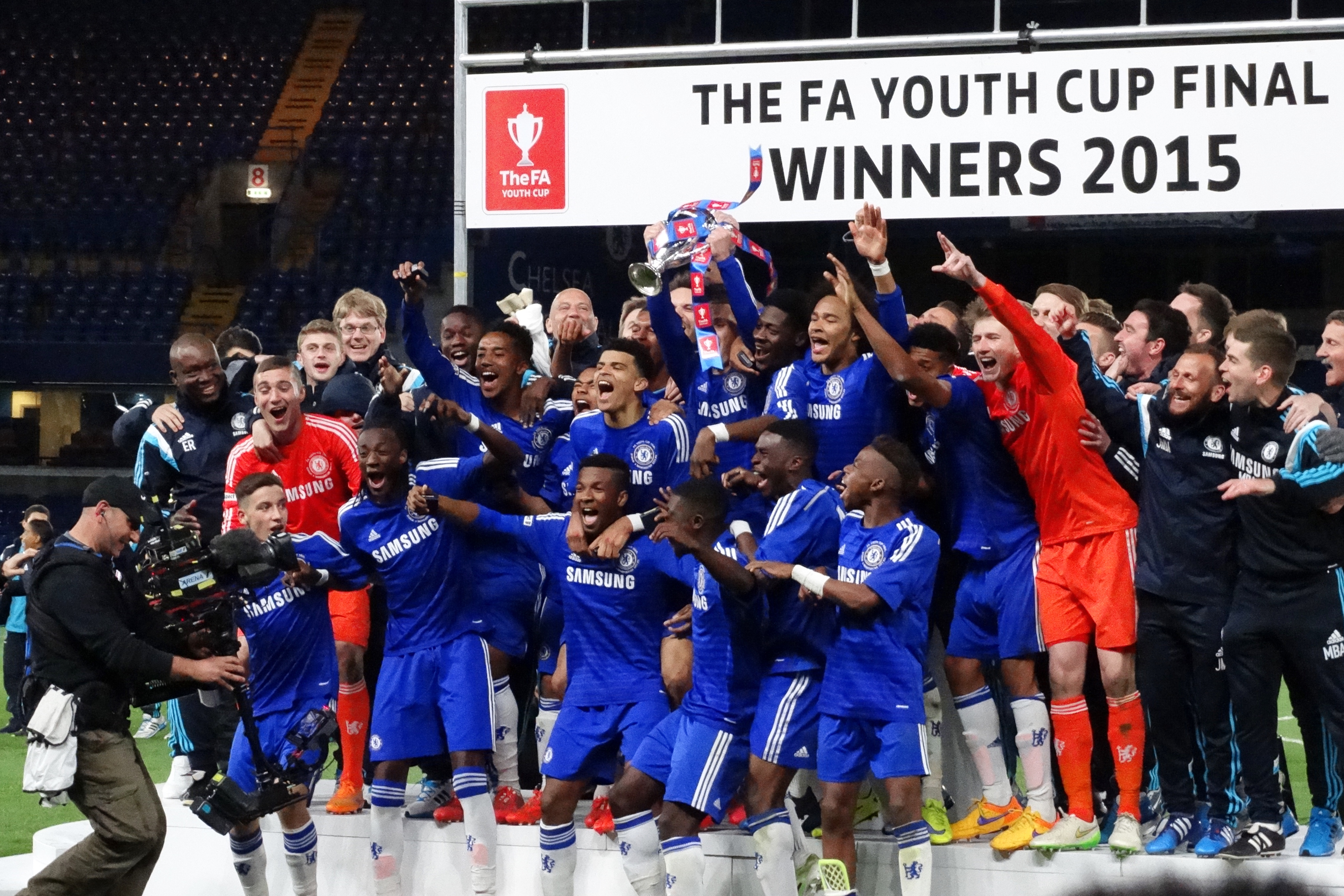
Chelsea players celebrating winning the cup.

== See also ==
- 2014–15 Professional U18 Development League
- 2014–15 Under-21 Premier League Cup
- 2014–15 FA Cup
- 2014–15 in English football
