= 1987–88 Eastern Counties Football League =

The 1987–88 season was the 46th in the history of Eastern Counties Football League a football competition in England.

The league featured 22 clubs which competed in the league last season, no new clubs joined the league this season. March Town United were champions, winning their first Eastern Counties Football League title. At the end of the season the league was expanded up to two divisions.

== League table ==
Eastern Counties Football League
- Season: 1987–88
- Champions: March Town United
- Matches: 462
- Goals: 1,326 (2.87 per match)

Pos	Team	Pld	W	D	L	GF	GA	GD	Pts	Promotion or relegation
1	March Town United	42	28	11	3	92	33	+59	67	
2	Braintree Town	42	27	10	5	96	34	+62	64	
3	Sudbury Town	42	26	11	5	94	44	+50	63	
4	Great Yarmouth Town	42	22	10	10	53	31	+22	54	
5	Histon	42	21	9	12	63	52	+11	51	
6	Wisbech Town	42	18	13	11	62	41	+21	49	
7	Chatteris Town	42	18	9	15	64	60	+4	45	
8	Lowestoft Town	42	16	12	14	72	68	+4	44	
9	Watton United	42	18	7	17	51	62	−11	43	
10	Haverhill Rovers	42	16	10	16	58	51	+7	42	
11	Tiptree United	42	13	15	14	50	49	+1	39 (Note: Tiptree United were deducted two points.)	
12	Clacton Town	42	15	8	19	54	66	−12	38	
13	Harwich & Parkeston	42	14	10	18	47	61	−14	38	
14	Colchester United reserves	42	12	13	17	61	52	+9	37	Resigned from the league
15	Newmarket Town	42	12	13	17	49	58	−9	37	
16	Thetford Town	42	14	7	21	70	82	−12	35	
17	Felixstowe Town	42	12	11	19	64	76	−12	35	
18	Gorleston	42	13	7	22	56	95	−39	31 (Note: Gorleston were deducted two points.)	
19	Stowmarket Town	42	10	10	22	44	66	−22	30	
20	Brantham Athletic	42	11	6	25	50	93	−43	28	
21	Soham Town Rangers	42	8	10	24	42	78	−36	26	
22	Ely City	42	7	10	25	34	74	−40	24	

Source: fchd
Rules for classification: 1) points; 2) goal difference; 3) number of goals scored.
