= 1981–82 Eastern Counties Football League =

The 1981–82 season was the 40th and the last under this name in the history of Eastern Counties Football League a football competition in England.

The league featured 22 clubs which competed in the league last season, no new clubs joined the league this season. Braintree & Crittall changed name to Braintree.

Tiptree United were champions, winning their first Eastern Counties Football League title.

== League table ==
Town & Country League
- Season: 1981–82
- Champions: Tiptree United
- Matches: 462
- Goals: 1,349 (2.92 per match)

Pos	Team	Pld	W	D	L	GF	GA	GD	Pts
1	Tiptree United	42	28	9	5	78	32	+46	65
2	Sudbury Town	42	25	10	7	82	38	+44	60
3	Gorleston	42	24	8	10	91	44	+47	56
4	Great Yarmouth Town	42	22	11	9	84	44	+40	55
5	Wisbech Town	42	21	9	12	67	40	+27	51
6	Saffron Walden Town	42	21	9	12	75	57	+18	51
7	Newmarket Town	42	19	11	12	72	56	+16	49
8	Brantham Athletic	42	18	13	11	59	50	+9	49
9	Chatteris Town	42	17	15	10	58	49	+9	49
10	Colchester United reserves	42	15	14	13	67	63	+4	44
11	Haverhill Rovers	42	12	17	13	52	53	−1	41
12	March Town United	42	13	15	14	58	62	−4	41
13	Lowestoft Town	42	15	9	18	68	63	+5	39
14	Felixstowe Town	42	14	10	18	66	81	−15	38
15	Ely City	42	12	13	17	55	78	−23	37
16	Histon	42	12	12	18	48	74	−26	36
17	Thetford Town	42	9	18	15	51	70	−19	36
18	Bury Town	42	12	10	20	52	77	−25	34
19	Braintree	42	10	8	24	44	86	−42	28
20	Clacton Town	42	7	9	26	43	74	−31	23
21	Soham Town Rangers	42	6	9	27	37	75	−38	21
22	Stowmarket	42	5	11	26	42	83	−41	21

Source: fchd
Rules for classification: 1) points; 2) goal difference; 3) number of goals scored.
