= Glyn Roberts (footballer) =

English footballer

Personal information
- Full name: Glyn Shane Roberts
- Date of birth: 19 October 1974 (age 52)
- Place of birth: Ipswich, England
- Position: Midfielder

Youth career
- Norwich City

Senior career*
Years	Team	Apps	(Gls)
1993–1995	Rotherham United	16	(1)
1995–1997	Chelmsford City		
1997–1998	King's Lynn		
1998–2001	Diss Town		
2001	Ipswich Wanderers		
2001–2002	Clacton Town		
- Stowmarket Town
- Debenham LC
- * Club domestic league appearances and goals

Glyn Shane Roberts (born 19 October 1974) is an English footballer who played as a midfielder.

== Career ==
In 1993, Roberts signed for Rotherham United, after spending time in the youth set-up at Norwich City. Roberts made 16 Football League appearances at Rotherham, scoring once. Following his spell at Rotherham, Roberts dropped into non-League football, signing for Chelmsford City. In 1997, Roberts joined King's Lynn. In November 1998, following becoming surplus to requirements at King's Lynn, Roberts signed for Diss Town. In 2001, Roberts joined hometown club Ipswich Wanderers, before joining Clacton Town a few months later in December 2001. In 2002, Roberts joined Stowmarket Town. In 2005, following a period out of the game, Roberts signed for newly promoted Eastern Counties League club Debenham LC.
