= 1982–83 Eastern Counties Football League =

The 1982–83 season was the 41st in the history of Eastern Counties Football League a football competition in England.

At the end of the previous season, the league called The Town & Country League was renamed back the Eastern Counties Football League. The league featured 22 clubs which competed in the league last season, no new clubs joined the league this season. Saffron Walden Town were champions, winning their first Eastern Counties Football League title.

== League table ==
Eastern Counties Football League
- Season: 1982–83
- Champions: Saffron Walden Town
- Matches: 462
- Goals: 1,550 (3.35 per match)

| Pos | Team | Pld | W | D | L | GF | GA | GD | Pts |
|---|---|---|---|---|---|---|---|---|---|
| 1 | Saffron Walden Town | 42 | 31 | 6 | 5 | 104 | 40 | +64 | 68 |
| 2 | Gorleston | 42 | 27 | 9 | 6 | 97 | 50 | +47 | 63 |
| 3 | Great Yarmouth Town | 42 | 26 | 9 | 7 | 101 | 52 | +49 | 61 |
| 4 | Brantham Athletic | 42 | 25 | 8 | 9 | 96 | 46 | +50 | 58 |
| 5 | Sudbury Town | 42 | 21 | 15 | 6 | 101 | 57 | +44 | 57 |
| 6 | Colchester United reserves | 42 | 24 | 8 | 10 | 104 | 42 | +62 | 56 |
| 7 | Lowestoft Town | 42 | 22 | 9 | 11 | 85 | 49 | +36 | 53 |
| 8 | Felixstowe Town | 42 | 19 | 15 | 8 | 70 | 50 | +20 | 53 |
| 9 | Wisbech Town | 42 | 22 | 7 | 13 | 83 | 67 | +16 | 51 |
| 10 | Newmarket Town | 42 | 16 | 14 | 12 | 70 | 60 | +10 | 46 |
| 11 | March Town United | 42 | 14 | 16 | 12 | 63 | 53 | +10 | 44 |
| 12 | Bury Town | 42 | 16 | 11 | 15 | 68 | 57 | +11 | 43 |
| 13 | Tiptree United | 42 | 13 | 10 | 19 | 61 | 71 | −10 | 36 |
| 14 | Stowmarket | 42 | 13 | 10 | 19 | 62 | 84 | −22 | 36 |
| 15 | Haverhill Rovers | 42 | 13 | 9 | 20 | 64 | 71 | −7 | 35 |
| 16 | Chatteris Town | 42 | 11 | 10 | 21 | 65 | 85 | −20 | 32 |
| 17 | Soham Town Rangers | 42 | 11 | 9 | 22 | 54 | 75 | −21 | 31 |
| 18 | Braintree | 42 | 9 | 8 | 25 | 48 | 102 | −54 | 26 |
| 19 | Histon | 42 | 9 | 6 | 27 | 53 | 101 | −48 | 24 |
| 20 | Clacton Town | 42 | 8 | 8 | 26 | 44 | 100 | −56 | 24 |
| 21 | Thetford Town | 42 | 7 | 6 | 29 | 36 | 109 | −73 | 20 |
| 22 | Ely City | 42 | 2 | 3 | 37 | 21 | 129 | −108 | 7 |

Source: fchd
Rules for classification: 1) points; 2) goal difference; 3) number of goals scored.
