= 1977–78 Eastern Counties Football League =

The 1977–78 season was the 36th in the history of Eastern Counties Football League a football competition in England.

The league featured 21 clubs which competed in the league last season, no new clubs joined the league this season. Lowestoft Town were champions, winning their tenth Eastern Counties Football League title.

At the end of the season the league was renamed the Town & Country League.

== League table ==
Eastern Counties Football League
- Season: 1977–78
- Champions: Lowestoft Town
- Matches played: 420
- Goals scored: 1,438 (3.42 per match)

Pos	Team	Pld	W	D	L	GF	GA	GD	Pts	Promotion or relegation
1	Lowestoft Town	40	30	7	3	108	27	+81	67	
2	Great Yarmouth Town	40	27	7	6	95	45	+50	61	
3	Bury Town	40	23	11	6	74	41	+33	57	
4	Gorleston	40	22	12	6	99	38	+61	56	
5	Wisbech Town	40	20	8	12	74	55	+19	48	
6	Thetford Town	40	20	8	12	93	67	+26	48	
7	Haverhill Rovers	40	21	5	14	88	54	+34	47	
8	Colchester United reserves	40	19	7	14	68	49	+19	45	
9	Clacton Town	40	17	10	13	69	66	+3	44	
10	Saffron Walden Town	40	19	6	15	71	70	+1	44	
11	Ely City	40	18	5	17	75	72	+3	41	
12	Sudbury Town	40	17	7	16	70	79	−9	41	
13	Braintree & Crittall Athletic	40	14	9	17	53	57	−4	37	
14	Stowmarket	40	12	8	20	43	59	−16	32	
15	Histon	40	12	8	20	46	67	−21	32	
16	March Town United	40	12	7	21	65	89	−24	31	
17	Felixstowe Town	40	11	7	22	44	74	−30	29	
18	Gothic	40	10	3	27	60	108	−48	23	Resigned from the league
19	Chatteris Town	40	8	5	27	60	107	−47	21	
20	Newmarket Town	40	9	2	29	44	104	−60	20	
21	Soham Town Rangers	40	4	8	28	39	110	−71	16	

Source: fchd
Rules for classification: 1) points; 2) goal difference; 3) number of goals scored.
