= MTFC =

MTFC can stand for:

- Macclesfield Town Football Club, an English football (soccer) club
- Mansfield Town Football Club, an English football (soccer) club
- Matlock Town Football Club, an English football (soccer) club
- Merthyr Town Football Club a Welsh football (soccer) club
- Mildenhall Town Football Club, an English football (soccer) club
- Morpeth Town Football Club, an English football (soccer) club
