= TUFC =

TUFC may refer to:

- Telford United F.C.
- Thika United F.C.
- Tiptree United F.C.
- Tobermore United F.C.
- Torquay United F.C.
- Tasburgh United F.C.
