= Rushmere, Ipswich =

Area of Ipswich, Suffolk, England

Coordinates: 52.0638°N 1.1922°E

Rushmere
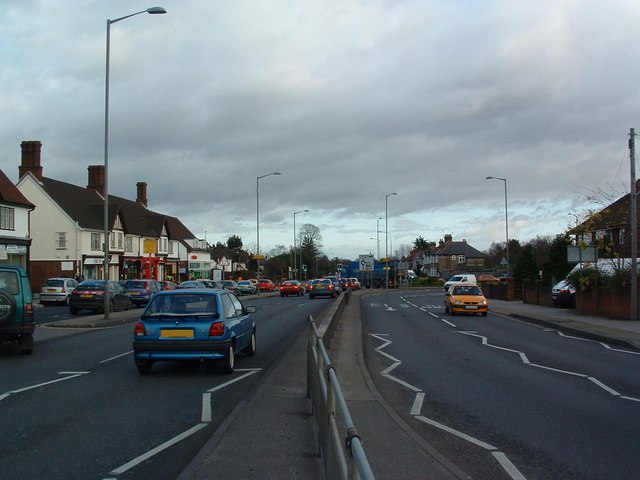

- Location within Suffolk
- District: Ipswich
- Shire county: Suffolk
- Region: East
- Country: England
- Sovereign state: United Kingdom
- Post town: IPSWICH
- Postcode district: IP4
- Dialling code: 01473
- UK Parliament: Central Suffolk and North Ipswich

Rushmere is an area of Ipswich and former civil parish in the Ipswich district in Suffolk, England. In 1901 the parish had a population of 601.

In 1894 the parish of Rushmere St Andrew was created from the rural part of the parish, on 25 March 1903 the parish was abolished to form Ipswich.

== Economy ==
The village has two churches (Church of England, and Baptist), two rugby clubs, and a village hall. The village is surrounded by fields and there are many routes into the Fynn Valley. Most of Rushmere is on one road, Rushmere Road. The boundary between Rushmere St Andrew and Ipswich runs along part of Humber Doucy Lane, which leads to the neighbouring village of Westerfield.

== Sport and leisure ==
Rushmere has a Non-League football club, Ipswich Wanderers, who play at Humber Doucy Lane.
