= North Essex League =

- Founded: 20 March 1895
- First season: 1895–96
- Folded: 1956
- Country: England
- Divisions: Two
- Number of clubs: 15 (1895–1901)
- Domestic cup(s): FA Cup; FA Amateur Cup

The North Essex League was a football league that was held in Essex, England, founded in 1895.

== History ==
On 20 March 1895, following a meeting at the George Hotel, Colchester, the North Essex League was voted into existence in order to improve the standard of football in north Essex. On 8 May 1895, following a meeting at the Angel Hotel, Witham, the first constitution for the league was decided, with Braintree Gordon, Chelmsford, Colchester, Colchester Excelsior, Colchester St. Peter's, Harwich & Parkeston, Heybridge and Witham making up the first division. Braintree Gordon II, Bocking, Chelmsford II, Clacton Town, Halstead, Maldon and Manningtree United were announced as founder members of the second division at the same meeting.

The league disbanded at the end of the 1955–56 season.

== Champions ==
=== North Essex League First Division ===
- 1895–96 – Harwich & Parkeston
- 1896–97 – Harwich & Parkeston
- 1897–98 – York & Lancaster Regiment
- 1898–99 – Harwich & Parkeston
- 1899–1900 – Colchester Town
- 1900–01 – Colchester Town
- 1902–03 – Heybridge Swifts
- 1905–06 – Manor Works
- 1910–11 – Manor Works
- 1911–12 – Manor Works
- 1924–25 – Heybridge Swifts

=== North Essex League Second Division ===
- 1896–97 – Manningtree United
- 1897–98 –
- 1898–99 – Clacton Town
- 1899–1900 – Clacton Town
- 1946–47 – Tiptree United

== Member clubs ==
- Arc Works
- Bocking
- Braintree
- Braintree Gordon
- Brightlingsea Town
- Burnham Ramblers
- Clacton Town
- Chelmsford
- Chelmsford Swifts
- Colchester Crown
- Colchester Excelsior
- Colchester St. Peter's
- Colchester Town
- Coggeshall Town
- Earls Colne
- Great Leighs
- Halstead
- Harwich & Parkeston
- Heybridge Swifts
- Maldon
- Maldon Town
- Manningtree United
- Manor Works
- Royal Irish Fusiliers
- Royal Warwick Regiment
- Saffron Walden
- Tiptree United
- Witham Town
- York & Lancaster Regiment
