= 1984–85 Essex Senior Football League =

The 1984–85 season was the 14th in the history of Essex Senior Football League, a football competition in England.

The league featured 16 clubs which competed in the league last season, no new clubs joined the league this season.

Maldon Town were champions, winning their first Essex Senior League title.

== League table ==
Essex Senior Football League
- Season: 1984–85
- Champions: Maldon Town
- Matches: 240
- Goals: 786 (3.28 per match)

Pos	Team	Pld	W	D	L	GF	GA	GD	Pts
1	Maldon Town	30	20	4	6	71	29	+42	64
2	Witham Town	30	20	4	6	59	27	+32	64
3	Stansted	30	19	5	6	80	29	+51	62
4	Wivenhoe Town	30	16	10	4	54	27	+27	58
5	Brentwood	30	18	3	9	73	46	+27	57
6	Chelmsford City reserves	30	14	8	8	61	37	+24	50
7	Canvey Island	30	14	8	8	53	40	+13	50
8	Ford United	30	13	7	10	47	33	+14	46
9	Bowers United	30	12	10	8	48	39	+9	46
10	Eton Manor	30	11	8	11	49	46	+3	41
11	Halstead Town	30	9	4	17	51	67	−16	31
12	Brightlingsea United	30	8	6	16	42	60	−18	30
13	East Thurrock United	30	7	8	15	30	44	−14	29
14	Sawbridgeworth Town	30	4	8	18	23	55	−32	20
15	East Ham United	30	4	5	21	37	83	−46	17
16	Coggeshall Town	30	2	0	28	8	124	−116	6

Source: fchd
Rules for classification: 1) points; 2) goal difference; 3) number of goals scored.
