= Eastern Counties Football League =

English football league

- Founded: 1935
- Country: England
- Divisions: Premier Division (1935–present); Division One North (1988–present); Division One South (2018–present)
- Number of clubs: 20 in Premier; 20 in North; 20 in South
- Level on pyramid: Levels 9–10
- Feeder to: Isthmian League Division One North; Northern Premier League Division One Midlands
- Relegation to: Anglian Combination; Cambridgeshire League; Essex Alliance League; Essex & Suffolk Border League; Essex Olympian League; Peterborough and District League; Suffolk & Ipswich League
- Domestic cup(s): League Cup; First Division Cup
- Current champions: Mulbarton Wanderers (Premier Division); Kings Park Rangers (Division One North); Hutton (Division One South) (2025–26)
- Website: thurlownunnleague.com
- Current: 2026–27 season

The Eastern Counties Football League, currently known as the Thurlow Nunn League for sponsorship purposes, is an English football league at levels 9 and 10 of the English football league system. It currently contains clubs from Norfolk, Suffolk, Essex, Cambridgeshire, eastern Hertfordshire, southern Lincolnshire, and north and east London. The league is a feeder to Division One North of the Isthmian League, but may also see sides promoted to the Northern Premier League Midlands Division.

== History ==
=== Formation ===
During the early part of the 20th century there were several leagues covering East Anglia, including the Norfolk & Suffolk League, the East Anglian League, the Essex & Suffolk Border League and the Ipswich & District League, whilst some of the larger clubs (including Ipswich Town and Cambridge Town) played in the Southern Amateur League. Suggestions of forming a league to cover the whole region had been made since the early 1900s, but intensified after Norwich City were promoted to Division Two of the Football League in 1934 and saw a significant rise in attendances. During the 1934–35 season there was a strong movement in Harwich and Ipswich for the formation of such a league and after canvassing, a 'Meeting of Representatives of East Anglian Football Clubs' was held at the Picture House in Ipswich on 17 February 1935. The ten clubs in attendance were Cambridge Town, Harwich & Parkeston and Ipswich Town from the SAL, Colchester Town and Crittall Athletic from the Spartan League, and Gorleston, Great Yarmouth Town, King's Lynn, Lowestoft Town and Norwich CEYMS from the Norfolk & Suffolk League. Although Cambridge Town and Norwich CEYMS later decided against joining, a further four clubs were recruited: Bury Town and Thetford Town from the Norfolk & Suffolk League, Chelmsford from the London League and Clacton Town from the Ipswich & District League.

=== Early years ===
The first season commenced on 31 August 1935 and ended with Harwich and Lowestoft level at the top of the league with 26 points each. Although Lowestoft had a better goal average, the championship was decided by a play-off match held at Layer Road on 29 August 1936. The match ended in a 3–3 draw and the two were declared joint champions and allowed to hold the trophy for six months each. At the end of the first season Ipswich left to join the Southern League and were replaced by their reserve team.

At the end of the 1936–37 season there were concerns about the league's viability. All five Essex clubs had left to join the newly established Essex County League, whilst Thetford had resigned after finishing bottom of the league, leaving only six remaining clubs. However, four new members (Colchester United reserves, Cromer, Newmarket Town and Norwich CEYMS) were recruited. The following season the league expanded to 13 clubs as three of the Essex clubs rejoined (the Essex County League had been a failure with only five members completing the season and was not continued).

The 1939–40 season started on 26 August, but was abandoned after the outbreak of World War II. After the war ended in May 1945 a meeting was held in late June to see whether the league could be restarted. However, a further meeting on 28 July decided that too few clubs were ready to resume footballing activities as many were unable to sign players and some grounds remained under the control of the armed forces. The league finally resumed for the 1946–47 season with ten clubs.

=== Later development ===
Prior to the start of the 1948–49 season the league was expanded to 16 clubs, largely through the addition of the 'A' teams of four London clubs, Arsenal, Chelsea, Tottenham Hotspur and West Ham United. The following season Gillingham reserves joined, becoming the only Kent-based club to ever play in the league (Dartford also applied to join at the same time, but were rejected). In 1951 the league gained its first Cambridgeshire club with the admission of Cambridge United, and by 1955–56 the league was up to 20 clubs, of which five were reserve or 'A' teams. Although a succession of clubs leaving the league saw it reduced to fourteen clubs by 1964, it quickly regained numbers and was back up to 18 members two years later. In 1976 the league was renamed the Eastern League, but returned to its original name six years later. The league was among the first to be sponsored by an external company when, in the late 1970s, it was sponsored by local building societies Magnet and Planet, and Town and Country. More recently, it has been sponsored by building supplies company Jewson, Ridgeons, and current sponsor Thurlow Nunn.

=== Expansion to two divisions ===
There had been occasional discussions about adding a second division to the league since its formation, but in 1983 it seemed about to become a reality. However, it was then delayed by the Football Association at the request of the Essex Senior League. The idea was resurrected during the 1987–88 season and a meeting was held to discuss it on 22 November 1987. The league contacted 21 clubs who were considered potential members, of which fifteen were interested in joining. A further four clubs were contacted and another (Long Sutton Athletic) asked for details. Ultimately fourteen clubs applied to join the league; eight from the Peterborough & District League (Downham Town, Huntingdon United, King's Lynn reserves, Ortonians, Somersham Town, Warboys Town and Yaxley – Parson Drove also applied later in the year, but were rejected), three from the Anglian Combination (Diss Town, Fakenham Town and Wroxham) and three from the Essex & Suffolk Border League (Bury Town reserves, Hatfield Peverel and Little Oakley). All were accepted except Hatfield Peverel and Little Oakley, whose grounds were deemed inadequate, whilst Ortonians later withdrew after difficulties getting their reserve and 'A' teams into the Peterborough & District League. Mildenhall Town from the Cambridgeshire League and Ipswich Wanderers from the Ipswich Sunday League were later invited to join, whilst Halstead Town were persuaded to transfer from the Essex Senior League after Ortonian's late withdrawal, allowing the inaugural Division One season in 1988–89 to start with 14 clubs.

=== Addition of Division One South ===
On 3 October 2017, The Football Association ratified the creation of a new Step 6 (level 10) division in the league, Division One South, which started playing in the 2018–19 season. It covers the rest of Essex, as well as East London and parts of North London and east Hertfordshire and is intended to enable promotion to the Essex Senior League and relegation to the Essex Olympian League.

== Current Eastern Counties League members ==
=== Premier Division ===
- Cornard United
- Dereham Town
- Ely City
- Fakenham Town
- Great Yarmouth Town
- Hadleigh United
- Harleston Town
- Haverhill Rovers
- Heacham
- Ipswich Wanderers
- Kirkley & Pakefield
- Lakenheath
- Mulbarton Wanderers
- Soham Town Rangers
- Stowmarket Town
- Thetford Town
- Walsham-le-Willows
- Woodbridge Town

=== Division One North ===
- AFC Sudbury reserves
- Diss Town
- Dussindale & Hellesdon Rovers
- FC Clacton
- FC Parson Drove
- FC Peterborough
- Framlingham Town
- Gorleston reserves
- Halesworth Town
- Haverhill Borough
- Holbeach United
- Holland
- Kings Park Rangers
- Leiston under 23s
- Long Melford
- Needham Market reserves
- Netherton United
- Stanway Pegasus
- Whittlesey Athletic
- Wivenhoe Town
- Wroxham reserves

=== Division One South ===
- AS London
- Barkingside
- Basildon Town
- Brimsdown
- Burnham Ramblers
- Cannons Wood
- Coggeshall Town
- Dunmow Town
- Enfield Borough
- FC Baresi
- FC Romania
- Hoddesdon Town
- Hutton
- Lymore Gardens
- May & Baker
- Newbury Forest
- NW London
- Rayleigh Town
- Southend Manor
- Stansted

== Former teams ==
103 teams have previously played in the Eastern Counties League, including several reserve and 'A' teams. The league's geographical span has previously stretched from Gillingham in Kent in the south to Boston in Lincolnshire in the north and Eynesbury in Cambridgeshire in the west. In the 1940s and 1950s it contained up to four 'A' teams from London.

- A.F.C. Sudbury (1999–2006) (Note: Moved up to the Isthmian or Southern League.)
- Arsenal 'A' (1948–55) (Note: Resigned or relegated from the league.)
- Benfleet (2018–2024) (Note: Moved up to the Essex Senior League or Spartan South Midlands League Premier Division.)
- Biggleswade Town (1955–63) (Note: Transferred to a different league at the same level.)
- Boston Town (1966–68)
- Braintree Town (four spells)
- Braintree Town Reserves (2012–19)
- Brightlingsea Regent (2011–14)
- Brightlingsea Regent Reserves (2018–20)
- Brightlingsea United (1990–2002)
- Buckhurst Hill (2021–22)
- Bungay Town (1963–64)
- Bury Town (three spells)
- Bury Town Reserves (1988–96) (Note: Replaced by relegated first team.)
- Cambridge City Reserves (six spells)
- Cambridge Regional College (2006–14)
- Cambridge United (1951–58)
- Cambridge United Reserves (1959–60, 1978–79)
- Cambridge University Press (2010–13)
- Chatteris Town (1966–2001)
- Chelmsford (1935–37)
- Chelmsford City Reserves (1938–63)
- Chelsea Reserves (1948–53)
- Clapton (2023–2024)
- Clapton Community (2023–2024)
- Coggeshall Town (2016–18)
- Coggeshall United (2018–23)
- Colchester Town (1935–37)
- Colchester United Reserves (1937–59, 1976–88)
- Cromer (1937–39) (Note: Did not return to the league after World War II.)
- Debenham LC (2005–23)
- Dereham Town Reserves (2013–17)
- Eynesbury Rovers (1952–63)
- FC Clacton (three spells)
- Felixstowe Port & Town (1976–2000) (Note: Merged to form a new club.)
- Felixstowe & Walton United (2000–18)
- Felixstowe & Walton United Reserves (2018–20)
- Fire United (2018–20)
- Frenford (2018–23)
- Fulbourn Institute (2005–06)
- Gillingham Reserves (1949–54)
- Godmanchester Rovers (2002–21)
- Gorleston (three spells)
- Gothic (1963–78)
- Halstead Town (1988–2022)
- Hashtag United (2018–19)
- Hertford Town (1972–73)
- Histon (1965–2000, 2017–19)
- Histon reserves (2000–11)
- Huntingdon Town (2021–23)
- Huntingdon United (1988–92)
- Ipswich Town (1935–36)
- Ipswich Town Reserves (1936–38)
- Ipswich Town 'A' (1948–51)
- Ipswich Wanderers (1988–2023)
- King's Lynn (1935–39, 1948–54)
- King's Lynn Reserves (four spells)
- King's Lynn Town Reserves (2014–21)
- Leiston (2001–11)
- Leyton Athletic (2019–20)
- Little Oakley (2017–21)
- Long Sutton Athletic (1988–95)
- Athletic Newham (2018–21)
- Lowestoft Town (1935–2009)
- Maldon Town (1966–72, 1996–2004)
- March Town United (1954–2022)
- Mildenhall Town (1998–2017, 2019–2024)
- Needham Market (1996–2010)
- Newmarket Town (1937–1952, 1959–2024)
- Norwich CBS (2017–2024)
- Norwich CEYMS (1937–39)
- Norwich City Reserves (1946–48)
- Norwich City 'A' (1949–58, 1963–75)
- Norwich United (1989–2016, 2018–23)
- Norwich United Reserves (2017–18)
- Peterborough North End Sports (2021–22)
- Peterborough United Reserves (1954–60, 1972–73)
- Romford Reserves (1959–63)
- Saffron Walden Town (three spells)
- Somersham Town (1988–2004)
- Southend United 'A' (1961–62)
- Spalding United (1955–60)
- Sporting Bengal United (2022–23)
- St Neots Town (1969–73)
- Stanway Rovers (1992–2018, 2019–21)
- Stowmarket Town (1952–2021)
- Sudbury Town (1955–90, 1997–99)
- Sudbury Town Reserves (1990–97)
- Sudbury Wanderers (1991–99)
- Team Bury (2009–18)
- Tiptree United (1979–2009)
- Tottenham Hotspur 'A' (1948–63)
- University of East Anglia (2021–22)
- Tower Hamlets (2022–2024)
- Warboys Town (1988–2004)
- Watton United (1986–2000)
- West Ham United 'A' (1948–56)
- White Ensign (2018–21)
- Wisbech St Mary (2016–22)
- Wisbech Town (three spells)
- Wormley Rovers (2018–2024)
- Wroxham (1989–2012, 2017–22)
- Yaxley (1988–92)

== Membership rejected ==
Between its inception in 1935 and the formalisation of promotion and relegation between the ECL and its feeder leagues in 1983, several clubs applied to join the Eastern Counties League but were rejected, or were approached by the league but turned the offer of admission down. These included:

Applied to the league but were rejected

- Chingford Town (1948)
- Dagenham (1949)
- Dagenham Town (1950)
- Dartford (1949)
- Exning Town (1959)
- Hoddesdon Town (1974)
- Hoffman Athletic (1938)
- Letchworth (1953)
- RAFFC (1937)
- Rushden Town (1954)
- Queens Park Rangers 'A' (1948)
- Sheringham (1937)
- Stevenage Athletic (1974)
- Tunbridge Wells (1954)

Approached by the league but declined

- Brentford 'A' (1947, 1948)
- Charlton Athletic 'A', (1948)
- Fulham 'A' (1948)
- Leyton Orient 'A' (1947)

== Champions ==
The champions of the league have been as follows:

Season	Eastern Counties League	League Cup
1935–36	Harwich & Parkeston/ Lowestoft Town (joint)	Harwich & Parkeston
1936–37	Crittall Athletic	Harwich & Parkeston
1937–38	Lowestoft Town	Great Yarmouth Town
1938–39	Colchester United Reserves	Lowestoft Town
1939–46	No competition due to World War II	
1946–47	Chelmsford City Reserves	Colchester United Reserves
1947–48	Chelmsford City Reserves	Colchester United Reserves
1948–49	Chelmsford City Reserves	Tottenham Hotspur 'A'
1949–50	Tottenham Hotspur 'A'	Chelsea 'A'
1950–51	Gillingham Reserves	Wisbech Town
1951–52	Gillingham Reserves	Gillingham Reserves
1952–53	Gorleston	Colchester United Reserves
1953–54	King's Lynn	King's Lynn
1954–55	Arsenal 'A'	Lowestoft Town
1955–56	Peterborough United Reserves	Gorleston
1956–57	Colchester United Reserves	Peterborough United Reserves
1957–58	Tottenham Hotspur 'A'	Colchester United Reserves
1958–59	Colchester United Reserves	Tottenham Hotspur 'A'
1959–60	Tottenham Hotspur 'A'	Chelmsford City Reserves
1960–61	Tottenham Hotspur 'A'	March Town United
1961–62	Tottenham Hotspur 'A'	Bury Town
1962–63	Lowestoft Town	Abandoned due to severe weather
1963–64	Bury Town	Bury Town
1964–65	Lowestoft Town	Haverhill Rovers
1965–66	Lowestoft Town	Lowestoft Town
1966–67	Lowestoft Town	Lowestoft Town
1967–68	Lowestoft Town	Chatteris Town
1968–69	Great Yarmouth Town	Lowestoft Town
1969–70	Lowestoft Town	Sudbury Town
1970–71	Lowestoft Town	Wisbech Town
1971–72	Wisbech Town	Wisbech Town
1972–73	Gorleston	Hertford Town
1973–74	Sudbury Town	Clacton Town
1974–75	Sudbury Town	Great Yarmouth Town
1975–76	Sudbury Town	Lowestoft Town
1976–77	Wisbech Town	Sudbury Town
1977–78	Lowestoft Town	Lowestoft Town

Season	Town & Country League	League Cup
1978–79	Haverhill Rovers	Cambridge United reserves
1979–80	Gorleston	Ely City
1980–81	Gorleston	Great Yarmouth Town
1981–82	Tiptree United	Tiptree United

Season	Eastern Counties League	League Cup
1982–83	Saffron Walden Town	Sudbury Town
1983–84	Braintree Town	Lowestoft Town
1984–85	Braintree Town	Tiptree United
1985–86	Sudbury Town	Tiptree United
1986–87	Sudbury Town	Sudbury Town
1987–88	March Town United	Braintree Town

Season	Premier Division	Division One	League Cup
1988–89	Sudbury Town	Wroxham	Sudbury Town
1989–90	Sudbury Town	Cornard United	Sudbury Town
1990–91	Wisbech Town	Norwich United	Histon
1991–92	Wroxham	Diss Town	Norwich United
1992–93	Wroxham	Sudbury Wanderers	Wroxham
1993–94	Wroxham	Hadleigh United	Woodbridge Town
1994–95	Halstead Town	Clacton Town	Wisbech Town
1995–96	Halstead Town	Gorleston	Halstead Town
1996–97	Wroxham	Ely City	Harwich & Parkeston
1997–98	Wroxham	Ipswich Wanderers	Woodbridge Town
1998–99	Wroxham	Clacton Town	Sudbury Wanderers
1999–2000	Histon	Tiptree United	Wroxham
2000–01	AFC Sudbury	Swaffham Town	Lowestoft Town
2001–02	AFC Sudbury	Norwich United	Clacton Town
2002–03	AFC Sudbury	Halstead Town	Wroxham
2003–04	AFC Sudbury	Cambridge City reserves	Maldon Town
2004–05	AFC Sudbury	Ipswich Wanderers	Halstead Town
2005–06	Lowestoft Town	Stanway Rovers	AFC Sudbury
2006–07	Wroxham	Walsham-le-Willows	Lowestoft Town
2007–08	Soham Town Rangers	Tiptree United	Needham Market
2008–09	Lowestoft Town	Newmarket Town	Leiston
2009–10	Needham Market	Great Yarmouth Town	Needham Market
2010–11	Leiston	Gorleston	Wisbech Town
2011–12	Wroxham	Godmanchester Rovers	Stanway Rovers
2012–13	Dereham Town	Cambridge University Press	Wisbech Town
2013–14	Hadleigh United	Whitton United	Newmarket Town
2014–15	Norwich United	Long Melford	Norwich United
2015–16	Norwich United	Wivenhoe Town	Mildenhall Town
2016–17	Mildenhall Town	Stowmarket Town	Mildenhall Town
2017–18	Coggeshall Town	Woodbridge Town	Brantham Athletic

Season	Premier Division	Division One North	Division One South	League Cup
2018–19	Histon	Swaffham Town	Hashtag United	Long Melford
2019–20	Season abandoned due to COVID-19 pandemic			
2020–21	Season curtailed due to anti-COVID-19 lockdown regulations			
2021–22	Gorleston	Sheringham	Ipswich Wanderers	Not held
2022–23	Ipswich Wanderers	Heacham	Frenford	Lakenheath
2023–24	Mildenhall Town	Great Yarmouth Town	Benfleet	Harlow Town
2024–25	Brantham Athletic	Haverhill Rovers	Harlow Town	Hackney Wick
2025–26	Mulbarton Wanderers	Kings Park Rangers	Hutton	Mulbarton Wanderers

== Records ==
=== Clubs ===
- Longest membership: Great Yarmouth Town – 1935 (founder members) to date
- Highest attendance: 8,387 for King's Lynn vs Wisbech Town, 12 September 1951

=== Matches ===
- Fewest defeats in a season: Chelmsford City reserves – undefeated in 1946–47
- Most wins in a season
  - Wroxham – 34 in 44 matches in 1996–97
  - Chelmsford City reserves – 16 in 18 matches in 1946–47 (89% victory rate)
- Fewest wins in a season: None by Thetford Town (1936–37), Newmarket Town (1951–52), Eynesbury Rovers (1960–61), Chatteris Town (1989–90), Clacton Town (2005–06)
- Most defeats in a season
  - Newmarket Town – lost all 34 matches in 1951–52
  - Clacton Town – lost 41 of 42 matches in 2005–06
- Most draws in a season: Watton United – drew 19 of 40 matches in 1989–90
- Biggest win: Lowestoft Town 19–0 Thetford Town, 20 March 1937
- Biggest away win: Newmarket Town 0–12 Biggleswade Town, 2 December 1961, Norwich United 0–12 Thetford Town, 9 September 2023 (Note: Result subsequently expunged after Norwich United's withdrawal from the league five days later.)
- Most consecutive wins: 19 by Lowestoft Town between 21 October 1967 and 13 April 1968
- Most wins from the start of a season: 18 by Bury Town in 1963–64
- Longest unbeaten run: 37 matches by Wisbech Town between 30 April 1983 and 20 April 1984
- Longest unbeaten start to a season: 34 matches by Wisbech Town in 1983–84
- Most consecutive defeats: 39 by Newmarket Town between 1951 and 1959 (they left the league in 1952 and returned in 1959)
- Most matches without a win: 45 by Newmarket Town between 1951 and 1959

=== Goals ===
- Most goals in a season
  - Lowestoft Town scored 157 in 34 matches in 1966–67 (4.62 a game)
  - Chelmsford City reserves scored 95 in 18 matches in 1946–47 (5.28 a game)
- Fewest goals conceded in a season: Norwich United – 19 in 36 matches (1990–91)
- Fewest goals scored in a season
  - Thetford Town – 18 in 19 matches (1936–37), Haverhill Rovers – 18 in 36 matches (1975–76), March Town United – 18 in 32 matches (2000–01), Warboys Town – 18 in 36 matches (2002–03)
  - Clacton Town – 20 in 42 matches in 2005–06
- Most goals conceded: Chatteris Town – 208 in 40 matches in 1989–90
- Most goals in a season: 57 in 30 matches by Mick Tooley (Lowestoft Town) in 1965–66
- Most goals in a game: 9 by Ivan Thacker for Lowestoft Town in a 16–0 win over Bury Town on 28 December 1935
- Most consecutive matches scored in: 18 by Mick Tooley (Lowestoft Town) during 1965–66
