= Maldon & Tiptree F.C. =

Association football club based in Maldon, Essex, United Kingdom

Coordinates: 51.7208°N 0.6940°E

Maldon & Tiptree
- Full name: Maldon & Tiptree Football Club
- Nickname: The Jammers
- Founded: 1946
- Ground: Park Drive, Maldon
- Capacity: 2,800 (155 seated)
- Owner(s): Sonny Shahnawaz, Shushel Miah, Igor Furtado, Jamil Trofder
- Manager: Steve Butterworth
- League: Isthmian League Premier Division
- 2025–26: Isthmian League North Division, 1st of 22 (promoted)
Home colours	Away colours

Maldon & Tiptree Football Club is a football club based in Maldon, Essex, England. They are currently members of the Isthmian League Premier Division and play at Park Drive.

== History ==
Maldon Town Football Club was established in August 1946 as part of the Maldon Social and Athletic Club. The club initially joined Division Two of the Chelmsford & Mid-Essex League. Although they transferred to the North Essex League the following season, the club returned to the Chelmsford & Mid-Essex League in 1949. They were Premier Division champions in 1949–50, retaining the title the following season, as well as winning the League Cup. The club then joined the Essex & Suffolk Border League for the 1951–52 season, finishing as runners-up in the Premier Division and losing the League Cup final. They were Premier Division runners-up again in 1955–56 and 1959–60.

In 1964–65 Maldon won the League Cup and the following season were Premier Division champions. The club then moved up to the Eastern Counties League. They finished in the bottom half of the Eastern Counties League every season until leaving to join the Essex Senior League in 1972. The club won the Essex Senior League in the 1984–85 on goal difference. In 1996 they rejoined the Eastern Counties League, becoming members of Division One. In the 1997–98 season the club were runners-up and were promoted to the Premier Division.

Maldon reached the semi-finals of the FA Vase in 2002–03, losing 3–0 on aggregate to AFC Sudbury, with the home leg attracting a record Wallace Binder Ground crowd of 1,163. The 2003–04 season saw the club finish as runners-up in the Premier Division, earning promotion to the Eastern Division of the Southern League. A third-place finish the following season led to them qualifying for the promotion play-offs; after beating Barking & East Ham United 3–2 on penalties in the semi-finals, they defeated Uxbridge in the final by the same scoreline and were promoted to the Premier Division of the Isthmian League. However, the club's first season in the division saw them finish in the bottom three, resulting in relegation to Division One North. Although they finished fourth in Division One North in 2006–07, they were ineligible for promotion and not allowed to take part in the play-offs.

In September 2009 Maldon Town were taken over by Tiptree United chairman Ed Garty, with both clubs playing at Maldon's ground. It was announced in April 2010 that Maldon Town would be rebranded as Maldon & Tiptree Football Club, with Tiptree United withdrawing from the Essex Senior League; a new blue and red striped kit was revealed ahead of the 2010–11 season. In 2012–13 they were runners-up in Division One North; in the subsequent play-offs the club defeated Aveley 3–1 in the semi-finals before losing 4–1 on penalties to Thamesmead Town in the final after the match had ended 2–2. They were Division One North runners-up again in 2016–17, beating Haringey Borough 5–4 in the play-off semi-finals and then losing 1–0 to Thurrock in the final. A third-place finish in the renamed North Division in 2018–19 resulted in another play-off campaign. After beating Coggeshall Town 1–0 in the semi-finals, they lost the final 3–0 on penalties to local rivals Heybridge Swifts following a 2–2 draw.

In 2019–20 Maldon & Tiptree reached the first round proper of the FA Cup for the first time in their history. After defeating League Two club Leyton Orient 2–1 in the first round, they lost 1–0 at home to another League Two club, Newport County, in the second. The club reached the first round again in 2020–21, losing 1–0 at home to Morecambe.

Under new ownership from February 2025 (initially involving Barrie Drewitt-Barlow, and later his son Aspen Drewitt-Barlow) they qualified for the first round again in the 2025–26 season, losing 5–1 away to League One team Port Vale. The season saw them go on to win the North Division title, earning promotion to the Premier Division under manager Kevin Horlock, appointed for a second time in February 2025. He stepped down in May 2026 and in June 2026 was succeeded by Mark Hawkes, formerly manager of Heybridge Swifts and Chelmsford City. Also in June 2026, the Jammers Fans Association wrote to the club asking for it be sold to new owners. On 9 September 2026, the club was acquired by a new ownership group.

== Grounds ==
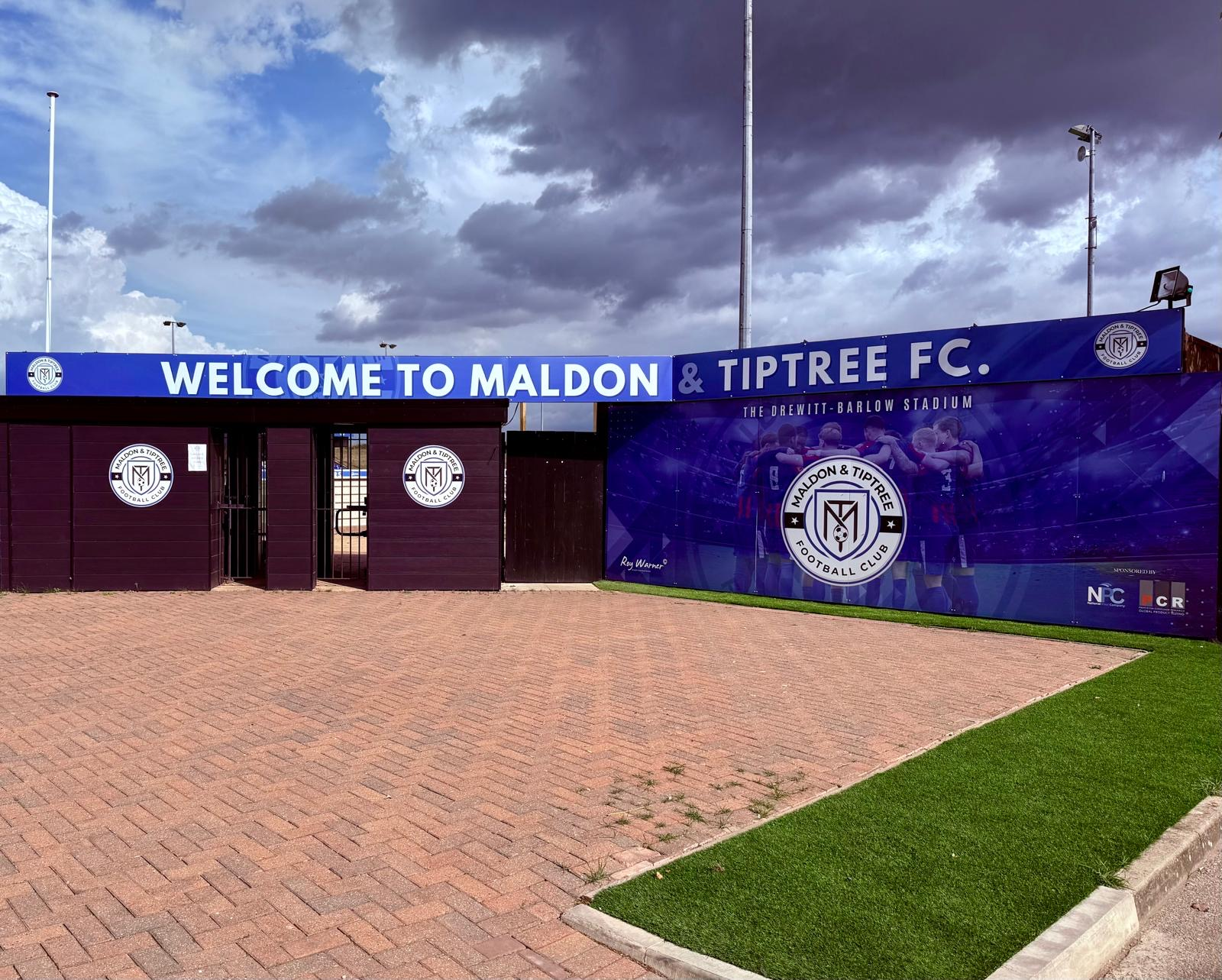
Entrance to Park Drive

The club initially played home games at Sadd's Ground on The Causeway. Between 1947 and 1950 they played at the Promenade before acquiring a new ground in Fambridge Road, where they remained until 1994. The club then moved to their current ground on Park Drive. The ground has a seated stand on one side of the pitch and a covered standing area behind one goal.

A record attendance was set in 2003 when 1,163 watched the FA Vase semi-final against AFC Sudbury. This was broken for the FA Cup match against Newport County on 29 November 2019, which attracted a crowd of 1,876.

== Honours ==
- Isthmian League
  - North Division champions 2025–26
- Essex Senior League
  - Champions 1984–85
- Essex & Suffolk Border League
  - Premier Division champions 1965–66
  - League Cup winners 1964–55
- Mid-Essex League
  - Premier Division champions 1949–50, 1950–51
  - League Cup winners 1950–51
- Essex Intermediate Cup
  - Winners 1951–52

== Records ==
- Best FA Cup performance: Second round, 2019–20
- Best FA Trophy performance: Third qualifying round, 2011–12, 2019–20
- Best FA Vase performance: Semi-finals, 2002–03
- Record attendance: 1,876 vs Newport County, FA Cup second round, 29 November 2019

== See also ==
- Maldon & Tiptree F.C. players
- Maldon & Tiptree F.C. managers
