= Diss Town F.C. =

Association football club in England

Coordinates: 52°22′51″N 1°05′50″E

Diss Town
- Full name: Diss Town Football Club
- Nickname: The Tangerines
- Founded: 1888
- Ground: Brewers Green Lane, Diss
- Chairman: Steve Flatman
- Manager: Scott Butler
- League: Eastern Counties League Division One North
- 2025–26: Eastern Counties League Division One North, 17th of 20
Home colours	Away colours

Diss Town Football Club is a football club based in Diss, Norfolk, England. Affiliated to the Norfolk County FA, they are members of the Eastern Counties League Division One North and play at Brewers Green Lane.

== History ==
The club was established in 1888 following a suggestion from the local cricket club. In 1892 they won their first trophy, the Norfolk Junior Cup, beating the Great Yarmouth Town second team 3–1 in a replay after the initial final had ended 0–0.

In 1906 Diss joined the Norwich and District League. In 1935 they moved up to the Norfolk & Suffolk League, and were runners-up in 1955–56. They won the league cup the following season, and again in 1959–60 (shared with Gothic) and 1960–61. In 1964 the club were founder members of the Anglian Combination, winning Division One in 1967–68 (also winning the league cup) and again in 1973–74. In 1974–75 Diss won the Norfolk Senior Cup, beating St Andrews 3–2 at Carrow Road. In 1975–76 they finished as league runners up and league cup winners. In 1976–77 they won the Premier Division, and won it again in 1978–79. In 1979–80 and 1981–82 the club won the league cup again.

In 1988 Diss were founder members of Division One of the Eastern Counties League. After finishing third, sixth and fourth, they won Division One in 1991–92 and were promoted to the Premier Division. In the same season, the club's reserve team won the Norfolk Junior Cup, a century after the first team had won it. Two seasons later the club won the FA Vase in front of a crowd of 13,450 at Wembley, beating Taunton Town 2–1 after extra time, following an injury time equaliser. The following season they finished as runners-up in the Premier Division and won the Norfolk Senior Cup again, beating Wroxham 4–0.

Diss won the Senior Cup for the third time in 2002–03, beating Great Yarmouth Town 4–1 in the final, and retained it the following season by beating Wroxham 3–0. In 2005 they reached the final for a third consecutive season, but lost on penalties to Wroxham. At the end of the 2006–07 season the club were relegated to Division One after finishing third-from-bottom of the Premier Division. In 2008–09 they won the Division One Cup, beating Hadleigh United 1–0 in the final. They returned to the Premier Division after finishing third in Division One in 2010–11. However, they were relegated back to Division One at the end of the 2014–15 season when they finished third-from-bottom of the Premier Division. When Division One was split in 2018, the club were placed in Division One North.

== Ground ==
Diss initially shared a ground on Roydon Road with the local cricket club. During the 1983–84 season they moved to a new ground at Brewers Green Lane. A 270-seat stand was built in 1992 and a covered standing area in 1998. An artificial pitch was installed in 2011.

== Honours ==
- FA Vase
  - Winners 1993–94
- Eastern Counties League
  - Division One champions 1991–92
  - Division One Cup winners 2008–09
- Norfolk & Suffolk League
  - League Cup winners 1956–57, 1959–60 (joint), 1960–61
- Anglian Combination
  - Premier Division champions 1976–77, 1978–79
  - Division One champions 1967–68, 1973–74
  - League Cup winners 1967–68, 1975–76, 1979–80, 1981–82
- Norfolk Senior Cup
  - Winners 1974–75, 1995–96, 2002–03, 2004–05
- Norfolk Junior Cup
  - Winners 1891–92

== Records ==
- Best FA Cup performance: Second qualifying round, 1956–57, 1994–95, 2002–03
- Best FA Vase performance: Winners 1993–94
- Record attendance: 1,731 vs Atherton LR, FA Vase semi-final, 19 March 1994

== See also ==
- Diss Town F.C. players
- Diss Town F.C. managers
