= Ely City F.C. =

Association football club in England

Coordinates: 52°24′36.94″N 0°14′49.05″E

Ely City
- Full name: Ely City Football Club
- Nickname: The Robins
- Founded: 1885
- Ground: The Demcom Stadium, Ely
- Capacity: 1,500 (120 seated)
- Chairman: Alan Alsop
- Manager: Guy Habbin
- League: Eastern Counties League Premier Division
- 2025–26: Eastern Counties League Premier Division, 3rd of 18
Home colours	Away colours

Ely City Football Club is a football club based in Ely, Cambridgeshire, England. They are currently members of the Eastern Counties League Premier Division and play at The Demcom Stadium.

== History ==
Ely City was established in 1885 by members of Ely St. Etheldreda Football and Cricket Club and are the oldest senior football club in Cambridgeshire. They joined the Cambridgeshire League in 1901, but withdrew during the 1902–03 season due to a dispute over fees. However, they rejoined the league the following season. The club absorbed Ely Albion in 1908. Promoted to Division One in 1921–22, the club were Division One runners-up the following season. They finished as runners-up again in 1924–25. In 1928 the league was restructured with Ely placed in Division One A. They finished bottom of the division in 1928–29 and were relegated to Division One B.

Further league restructuring in 1931 saw Ely promoted to the new Premier Division. They were relegated after finishing second-from-bottom in 1936–37, returning to the Premier Division in 1946. The club won both Cambridgeshire Senior Cups in 1948 and were Premier Division runners-up in 1949–50. In 1951 they left the Cambridgeshire League to join the Premier Division of the Peterborough & District League. They were league champions in 1955–56, and in 1956–57 the club reached the first round of the FA Cup after winning five qualifying rounds. Drawn at home to Torquay United, they lost 6–2 in front of a crowd of 4,223. The season also saw them finish as runners-up in the league, a feat they repeated the following season.

In 1958 Ely joined Division One South of the Central Alliance, where they played for two years before being elected to the Eastern Counties League. In 1967 former Northern Irish international Hugh Barr was appointed player-manager, leading the club to runners-up position in the league in 1968–69. They won the Cambridgeshire Invitation Cup in 1969–70 and the Eastern Counties League Cup in 1979–80, beating Lowestoft Town 4–2 on aggregate. When the league gained a second division in 1988, the club were placed in the Premier Division, but were relegated to Division One at the end of the 1988–89 season. They returned to the Premier Division after winning Division One in 1996–97 and were Premier Division runners-up the following season, but were relegated again at the end of the 1998–99 season, which had seen them finish bottom of the Premier Division.

Ely made an immediate return to the Premier Division as Division One runners-up in 1999–2000, also winning the Division One Cup. In 2002 they won the Cambridgeshire Invitation Cup, beating Histon 1–0 at the Abbey Stadium in Cambridge. At the end of the 2002–03 season they were relegated again after finishing bottom of the Premier Division. In 2007–08 the club won the Division One Cup and finished runners-up in Division One, earning promotion back to the Premier Division. In 2011–12 the club finished as runners-up in the Premier Division and won the Cambridgeshire Invitation Cup for a third time. They retained the Invitation Cup in 2012–13 with a 3–0 win over Cambridge City in the final. The club were relegated back to Division One in at the end of the 2014–15 season after finishing bottom of the Premier Division. The following season they set a club record by winning fourteen matches in a row as they finished second in Division One, earning promotion back to the Premier Division.

The 2017–18 season saw Ely win the Cambridgeshire Invitation Cup for a fifth time, defeating Cambridge United Development in the final. They retained the trophy the following season, winning the final against Histon 2–1. In 2024–25 the club finished fourth in the Premier Division, qualifying for the promotion play-offs, in which they lost 3–0 to Downham Town in the semi-finals.

== Ground ==
The club played at the Paradise Ground until 1986, when they moved to the Unwin Sports Ground; the final match at the Paradise Ground was a 3–2 loss to Felixstowe Town. The new ground was originally known as Downham Road until it was named after Doug Unwin, who was involved with the club from 1934 until his death in 1999. The first match at the new ground was a 4–1 loss to Tiptree United in the FA Cup first qualifying round. In 1994 a new 200-seat stand was built.

== Honours ==
- Eastern Counties League
  - League Cup winners 1979–80
  - Division One champions 1996–97
  - Division One Cup winners 1999–2000, 2004–05, 2007–08
- Peterborough & District League
  - Premier Division champions 1955–56
- Cambridgeshire Senior Cup
  - Winners 1947–8
- Cambridgeshire Invitation Cup
  - Winners 1969–70, 2001–02, 2011–12, 2012–13, 2017–18, 2018–19

== Records ==
- Best FA Cup performance: First round, 1956–57
- Best FA Vase performance: Fifth round, 2016–17
- Best FA Trophy performance: Second qualifying round, 1973–74
- Record attendance:
  - At the Unwin Ground: 712 vs Soham Town Rangers F.C., Thurlow Nunn League Playoff Semi Final, 25 April 2026
  - At the Paradise Ground: 4,223 vs Torquay United, FA Cup first round, 1956–57

== See also ==
- Ely City F.C. players
- Ely City F.C. managers
