= Wroxham F.C. =

Association football club in England

Coordinates: 52°42′03″N 1°23′50″E

Wroxham
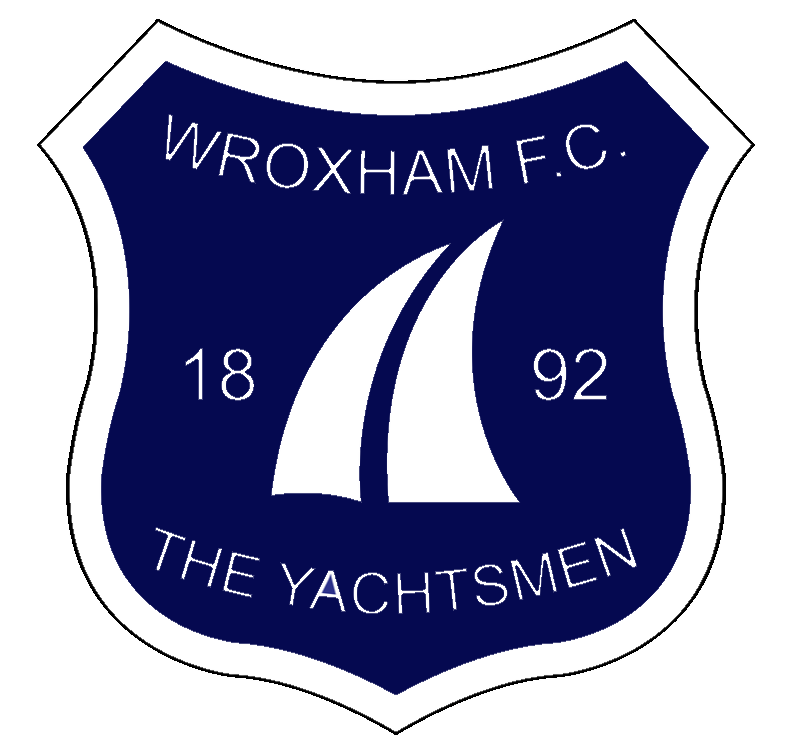
- Full name: Wroxham Football Club
- Nickname: The Yachtsmen
- Founded: 1892
- Ground: Trafford Park, Wroxham
- Capacity: 2,500
- Chairman: James Blower
- Manager: Vacant
- League: Isthmian League North Division
- 2025–26: Isthmian League North Division, 8th of 22
Home colours	Away colours

Wroxham Football Club is a football club based in Wroxham, Norfolk, England. They are currently members of the Isthmian League North Division and play at Trafford Park.

== History ==
The club was established in 1892 by George Preston, a former captain of the Norfolk County team. They played friendly matches until entering teams into the East Norfolk League and the Norwich City Junior League. They joined the East Anglian League in 1935, but after finishing bottom of the league in 1953–54 and 1954–55, they dropped into the Norwich and District League, a time during which they suffered a record 24–0 defeat.

When the East Anglian League merged with the Norfolk & Suffolk League to form the Anglian Combination in 1964, Wroxham joined the new league, becoming a member of Section D. After winning the Norfolk Junior Cup in 1974–75, they were Division Two champions in 1975–76 and Division One champions the following season, earning promotion to the Premier Division. In 1980–81 the club won the Knock-Out Cup, and in 1981–82 they were Premier Division champions, going on to retain the title in for the next three seasons, also winning the Knock-Out Cup in 1982–83, 1984–85 and 1986–87.

After winning the Premier Division of the Anglian Combination for a fifth time in 1987–88, Wroxham moved up to the newly formed Division One of the Eastern Counties League. They won the division in its inaugural season, beating Halstead Town to the title on goal difference, and were promoted to the Premier Division. After finishing twelfth in their first season in the Premier Division, the club finished eighth or higher in each of the next 22 seasons, winning the division for the first time with a record 99 points in 1991–92. The 1992–93 was the club's centenary, and saw them beat their record by retaining the league title with 100 points, as well as winning the League Cup and the Norfolk Senior Cup. In 1993–94 they won a third consecutive Premier Division title. After a gap of two seasons, the club won the Premier Division again in 1996–97 with 109 points, a season in which they also won the Senior Cup. They retained the title and the Senior Cup in 1997–98, before winning the league for a third time in a row in 1998–99.

Further success saw Wroxham win the League Cup and Norfolk Senior Cup in 1999–2000, the Norfolk Senior Cup in 2001–02, 2003–04 and 2007–08, and the Eastern Counties League Premier Division title in 2006–07. In 2009–10 the club reached the final of the FA Vase, but lost 6–1 to holders Whitley Bay. In 2011–12 they won the Premier Division for the eighth time this time taking promotion to the North Division of the Isthmian League. Although the club finished in the relegation zone in 2013–14, they were reprieved from relegation when Worksop Town resigned from the Northern Premier League. The club finished in the relegation zone again in 2015–16, but were again reprieved. However, they finished second-from-bottom of the division the following season and were relegated back to the Eastern Counties League Premier Division. In 2021–22 the club were Premier Division runners-up, earning promotion back to the renamed North Division of the Isthmian League.

== Ground ==
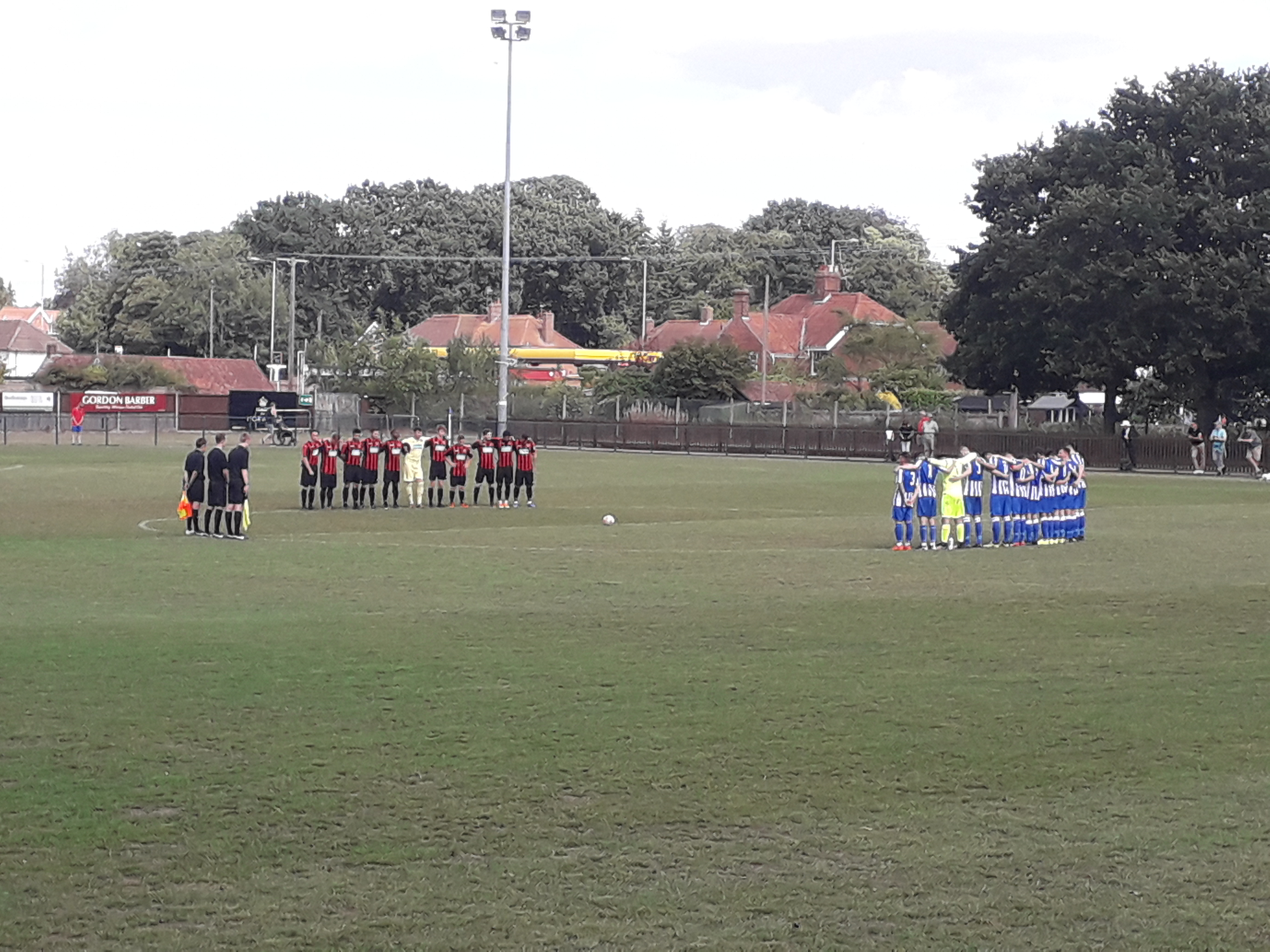
Wroxham (blue and white) ahead of an FA Cup tie against Saffron Walden

The club initially played at Wroxham Park. They subsequently played at The Avenue and Keys Hill. In the 1940s the club moved to Trafford Park, a field on Skinners Lane. An old timber pavilion was moved from the previous ground and used as a clubhouse. This was replaced by pre-fabricated buildings around fifteen years later.

The current main stand, the Les King Stand, was built in 1990, replacing a stand that had been in use for around a decade. Floodlights were erected in the early 1990s and a new clubhouse built in 1994. The record attendance of 1,262 was set in 2010 for an FA Vase semi-final against Whitehawk.

== Honours ==
- Eastern Counties League
  - Premier Division champions 1991–92, 1992–93, 1993–94, 1996–97, 1997–98, 1998–99, 2006–07, 2011–12
  - Division One champions 1988–89
  - League Cup winners 1992–93, 1999–2000
- Anglian Combination
  - Premier Division champions 1981–82, 1982–83, 1983–84, 1984–85, 1987–88
  - Division One champions 1976–77
  - Division Two champions 1975–76
  - Knock-out Cup winners 1980–81, 1982–83, 1984–85, 1986–87
- Norfolk Senior Cup
  - Winners 1992–93, 1996–97, 1997–98, 1999–2000, 2001–02, 2003–04, 2007–08, 2014–15
- Norfolk Junior Cup
  - Winners 1974–75

== Records ==
- Best FA Cup performance: Third qualifying round, 2001–02, 2005–06, 2008–09, 2011–12
- Best FA Trophy performance: First qualifying round, 2012–13, 2013–14, 2016–17, 2025–26
- Best FA Vase performance: Finalists, 2009–10
- Most appearances: Stu Larter
- Most goals: Matthew Metcalf
- Heaviest defeat: 24–0
- Record attendance: 1,262 vs Whitehawk, FA Vase semi-final, 10 September 2010

== See also ==
- Wroxham F.C. players
- Wroxham F.C. managers
