= Mildenhall Town F.C. =

Association football club in England

Coordinates: 52°20′32.80″N 0°30′54.09″E

Mildenhall Town
- Full name: Mildenhall Town Football Club
- Nickname: The Hall
- Founded: 1898
- Ground: Recreation Way, Mildenhall
- Capacity: 2,000 (50 seated)
- Manager: Vacant
- League: Eastern Counties League Premier Division
- 2025–26: Isthmian League North Division, 19th of 22 (relegated)
Home colours	Away colours

Mildenhall Town Football Club is a football club based in Mildenhall, Suffolk. They are currently members of the Eastern Counties League Premier Division and play at Recreation Way.

== History ==
The club was established in August 1898. They won the Suffolk Junior Cup in 1900, beating Southwold RA Volunteers 4–0 in the final. In 1945 the club joined the Bury & District League, where they played until switching to the Cambridgeshire League in 1969. In 1974–75 they were promoted to the league's Premier Division.

In 1988 Mildenhall joined the Eastern Counties League as founder members of the new Division One. The club won the Cambridgeshire Invitation Cup in 1995–96, beating Foxton 3–0 in the final. They were Division One runners-up in 1998–99, earning promotion to the Premier Division. In 2006–07 the club were runners-up in the Premier Division. They won the Cambridgeshire Invitation Cup for a second time in 2009–10, beating Wisbech Town in the final, and went on to retain the trophy the following season with a 2–0 win against Haverhill Rovers.

The 2016–17 season saw Mildenhall win the Eastern Counties League Premier Division title, resulting in promotion to Division One North of the Isthmian League. They finished bottom of the division in 2018–19 and were relegated back to the Premier Division of the Eastern Counties League. In 2023–24 the club were Premier Division champions, earning promotion to the Isthmian League's North Division.

== Ground ==
After playing at several grounds, the club moved to its current ground on Recreation Way following World War II, initially sharing with the cricket club. The site had been gifted to the town by the Bunhill family during the war. In 1970 the cricket club left and the football pitch was rotated 90º. Following promotion to the Eastern Counties League, a 250-capacity standing covered area was erected in 1989 and a clubhouse was built in 1991. Floodlights were installed in 1994. Another 50-seat stand was installed in 2017.

== Honours ==
- Eastern Counties League
  - Premier Division champions 2016–17, 2023–24
  - League Cup winners 2015–16, 2016–17
- Cambridgeshire Invitation Cup
  - Winners 1995–96, 2009–10, 2010–11
- Suffolk Junior Cup
  - Winners 1899–1900

== Records ==
- Best FA Cup performance: Third qualifying round, 2000–01
- Best FA Trophy performance: Third qualifying round, 2017–18
- Best FA Vase performance: Fifth round, 2005–06, 2006–07
- Record attendance: 682 vs Bury Town, 24 December 2024, Isthmian League North Division

== See also ==
- Mildenhall Town F.C. players
- Mildenhall Town F.C. managers
