= Hadleigh United F.C. =

Association football club in England

Coordinates: 52°02′20.03″N 0°57′15.46″E

Hadleigh United
- Full name: Hadleigh United Football Club
- Nickname: The Brettsiders
- Founded: 1892
- Ground: Millfield, Hadleigh
- Capacity: 3,000 (250 seated)
- Chairman: Mark Ward
- Manager: Darren Harvey & David Thurkettle
- League: Eastern Counties League Division One North
- 2025–26: Eastern Counties League Premier Division, 18th of 18 (relegated)
Home colours	Away colours

Hadleigh United Football Club is a football club based in Hadleigh, Suffolk, England. The club are currently members of the Eastern Counties League Division One North and play at the Millfield.

== History ==
The club was founded in 1892 and joined Division Three, Section A of the Ipswich & District League in 1929. For the 1930–31 season the club was moved to Division Two A. They avoided relegation despite finishing of the division in 1931–32 and went on to win the division in 1933–34, winning 24 of their 26 matches. They were Division Two A runners-up for the next two seasons, and were promoted to Division One in 1936. However, after finishing bottom of Division One in 1937–38, the club were relegated back to Division Two, Section A.

After World War II Hadleigh won Division Two in 1948–49 and after being promoted, were Premier Division champions in 1953–54 and 1956–57. They club dropped out of the SIL during the 1964–65 season, but re-joined for the 1965–66 campaign. In 1968–69 the club won the Suffolk Senior Cup, beating Westerfield 3–2 in the final. They won the cup again in 1971–72 with a 1–0 victory over ICI Paints. They won a third Ipswich & District League title in 1972–73 and the 1976–77 season saw the club win the double, winning both the league title and the League Cup. They won the (now renamed) Suffolk & Ipswich League title again in 1978–79 and went on to win the League Cup in 1980–81, 1981–82 and 1986–87. The club also won the Suffolk Senior Cup in 1982–83 with a 4–1 win over Crane Sports.

In 1991 Hadleigh moved up to Division One of the Eastern Counties League. They won the division in 1993–94, earning promotion to the Premier Division. However, after finishing second-from-bottom of the Premier Division in 1996–97, the club returned to Division One. The club won the Suffolk Senior Cup for a fourth time in 2003–04. In 2008–09 they finished as runners-up in Division One and were promoted back to the Premier Division. In 2013–14 the club won the Eastern Counties League title for the first time.

In 2025–26 Hadleigh finished bottom of the Premier Division and were relegated to Division One North.

== Ground ==
The club moved to their current ground, the Millfield, in 1954. In 1964 they were temporarily unable to play at the ground due to an unsatisfactory pitch and problems with stones. Floodlights were erected during the 1993–94 season.

== Honours ==
- Eastern Counties League
  - Premier Division champions 2013–14
  - Division One champions 1993–94
- Suffolk Senior Cup
  - Winners 1968–69, 1971–72, 1982–83, 2003–04
- Suffolk & Ipswich League
  - Champions 1953–54, 1956–57, 1972–73, 1976–77, 1978–79
  - Division Two champions 1958–49
  - Division Two A champions 1933–34
  - League Cup winners 1976–77, 1980–81, 1981–82, 1986–87

== Records ==
- Best FA Cup performance: First qualifying round, 1995–96, 2012–13, 2014–15
- Best FA Vase performance: Quarter-finals, 2012–13
- Record attendance: 518 vs Halstead Town, FA Vase, 17 January 1995

== See also ==
- Hadleigh United F.C. players
- Hadleigh United F.C. managers
