= Ipswich Wanderers F.C. =

Association football club in England

Coordinates: 52°03′54.09″N 1°12′26.93″E

Ipswich Wanderers
- Full name: Ipswich Wanderers Football Club
- Nickname: The Wanderers
- Founded: 1980
- Ground: Humber Doucy Lane, Rushmere
- Manager: James Buckle and Mark Goldfinch
- League: Eastern Counties League Premier Division
- 2024–25: Isthmian League North Division, 20th of 22 (relegated)
Home colours	Away colours

Ipswich Wanderers Football Club is a football club based in Ipswich, Suffolk, England. They are currently members of the Eastern Counties League Premier Division and play at Humber Doucy Lane in Rushmere.

== History ==
The club was established as an under-14 boys team based in Bramford in 1980. In 1982 they joined the bottom division of the Ipswich Sunday League. Sponsorship resulted in a name change during 1988 to Loadwell Ipswich. In the same year they became founder members of Division One of the Eastern Counties League. The club was renamed Ipswich Wanderers in 1989. In 1997–98 they were Division One champions, earning promotion to the Premier Division. Their first season in the Premier Division was a struggle and they were saved from relegation only by the merger of Sudbury Town and Sudbury Wanderers. However, they won the East Anglian Cup, defeating St Neots Town in the final. However, the club were relegated back to Division One at the end of the 2002–03 season.

Ipswich Wanderers were Division One champions in 2004–05, earning promotion to the Premier Division. They were relegated to Division One again after finishing bottom of the Premier Division in 2007–08. In 2012–13 the club won the Suffolk Senior Cup for the first time, beating local rivals Whitton United on penalties in the final at Portman Road. They were promoted back to the Premier Division after finishing third in Division One in 2013–14. The 2017–18 season saw the club finish in the second-from-bottom of the Premier Division, resulting in relegation to Division One North. At the end of the 2020–21 season they were transferred to Division One South, winning nine and drawing one of the ten matches that were played before the season was suspended due to the COVID-19 pandemic. In the 2021–22 season the club won 23 consecutive league matches, going on to win the Division One title and earn promotion to the Premier Division. They also won the Suffolk Senior Cup, defeating Leiston reserves 1–0 in the final. The following season saw them win the Premier Division, earning promotion to the North Division of the Isthmian League.

== Honours ==
- Eastern Counties League
  - Premier Division champions 2022–23
  - Division One champions 1997–98, 2004–05
  - Division One South champions 2021–22
- East Anglian Cup
  - Winners 1998–99
- Suffolk Senior Cup
  - Winners 2012–13, 2021–22

== Records ==
- Best FA Cup performance: Second qualifying round, 2000–01, 2001–02, 2015–16
- Best FA Vase performance: Fifth round, 2006–07, 2015–16
- Record attendance: 550 vs Ipswich Town XI, Suffolk Premier Cup semi-final, 2006–07

== See also ==
- Ipswich Wanderers F.C. players
- Ipswich Wanderers F.C. managers
