= Haverhill Rovers F.C. =

Association football club in England

Coordinates: 52.086402°N 0.449141°E

Haverhill Rovers
- Full name: Haverhill Rovers Football Club
- Nickname: Rovers
- Founded: 1886
- Ground: The New Croft, Haverhill
- Capacity: 3,000 (200 seated)
- Manager: Ben Cowling
- League: Eastern Counties League Premier Division
- 2024–25: Eastern Counties League Division One North, 1st of 20 (promoted)
| Home colours | Away colours |

Haverhill Rovers Football Club are a football club based in Haverhill, Suffolk, England. They are currently members of the Eastern Counties League Premier Division and play at the New Croft.

== History ==
The club was established in 1886. They joined the East Anglian League in 1906, and became members of its Premier Division when a second division was added in 1907. However, after finishing second-from-bottom of the Premier Division in 1907–08, the club were relegated to Division One. They left the league at the end of the 1908–09 season and later joined the Essex & Suffolk Border League. The club were Division Two runners-up in 1912–13 and won Division Two West in 1919–20.

Haverhill were runners-up in the Essex & Suffolk Border League Premier Division in 1946–47, and did the double in 1947–48, winning both the league and the league cup, beating Brightlingsea United 1–0 in the final. They finished runners-up again in 1950–51, and won the league for a second time in 1962–63, before going on to claim a second double the following season, beating Ipswich Town 'A' 3–1 in the League Cup final. In 1964 they joined the Eastern Counties League, and won the League Cup in their first season. In 1978–79 they won the Eastern Counties League title, with the final match against Chatteris Town being watched by 1,300 supporters, a club record at the time.

In 1986–87 Haverhill reached the quarter-finals of the FA Vase, where they lost to Warrington Town in front of another record crowd of 1,578. In 1991 they won the East Anglian Cup, beating Eynesbury Rovers 2–1 in the final. At the end of the 1995–96 season the club were relegated to Division One after finishing second-from-bottom of the Premier Division. The following season they won the Suffolk Senior Cup, beating Ipswich Wanderers 4–1 in the final. They won the Division One Cup in 2000–01 with a 2–1 win over Needham Market in the final. They won the cup again in 2003–04, defeating Kirkley 2–0 in the final, before winning it for a third time in 2006–07 after beating Saffron Walden Town 3–1.

In 2006 Haverhill reached the fourth and final qualifying round of the FA Cup for the first time. Although they lost 4–0 to Conference club Aldershot Town, a new record attendance of 1,730 was set. The club were Division One runners-up in 2006–07, earning promotion to the Premier Division. They finished bottom of the division in 2008–09 but avoided relegation after Whitton United withdrew mid-season and Tiptree United left the league. After finishing second-from-bottom of the Premier Division in 2022–23 the club were relegated to Division One North. In 2024–25 they were Division One North champions and promoted back to the Premier Division.

== Ground ==
The club initially played at the Seven Acres ground, before moving to Hamlet Croft in 1913. The pitch originally had a clear slope, but was levelled in the early 1960s, with the club having to play on a local recreation ground whilst the works were carried out. The main stand was built in 1935 at a cost of £250. The club remained at Hamlet Croft until 2010, when they moved to the New Croft, initially sharing the pitch with Haverhill Borough before Borough switched to playing on the artificial pitch at the same complex in 2016.

== Staff ==
| Role | Member of staff |
|---|---|
| Manager | Ben Cowling |
| Assistant Manager | Martin Westcott |
| First Team Coach | Tom Walker |

== Honours ==
- Eastern Counties League
  - Champions 1978–79
  - Division One champions 2024–25
  - League Cup winners 1964–65
  - Division One Cup winners 2000–01, 2003–04, 2006–07
- Essex & Suffolk Border League
  - Premier Division champions 1947–48, 1962–63, 1963–64
  - Division Two West champions 1919–20
  - League Cup winners 1947–48, 1963–64
- Suffolk Senior Cup
  - Winners 1996–97
- East Anglian Cup
  - Winners 1990–91

== Records ==
- Best FA Cup performance: Fourth qualifying round, 2006–07
- Best FA Trophy performance: Second qualifying round, 1969–70
- Best FA Vase performance: Quarter-finals, 1986–87
- Record attendance: 1,730 vs Aldershot Town, FA Cup fourth qualifying round, 2006–07 (at Hamlet Croft)

== See also ==
- Haverhill Rovers F.C. players
- Haverhill Rovers F.C. managers
