= Tiptree United F.C. =

Tiptree United
- Full name: Tiptree United Football Club
- Nickname: The Jam Makers
- Founded: 1933
- Dissolved: 2010
- Ground: Chapel Road, Tiptree
- Capacity: 2,000
Home colours	Away colours

Tiptree United F.C. was an English football club based in Tiptree, Essex. Established in 1933, the club was absorbed into Maldon Town in 2010, creating Maldon & Tiptree.

== History ==
The club was founded in 1933 by a merger of Anchor Press of the Essex & Suffolk Border League and Tiptree Heath of the Kelvedon & District League. The new club joined both the Braintree & District League and Division Two of the North Essex League, winning the former in their first season. They then moved to the Brightlingsea & District League, winning the league and league cup double in their debut season. In 1935 they absorbed fellow Brightlingsea & District League club Tiptree Rovers, and the following season they won the league cup again. In 1936 they re-entered the North Essex League but also continued to run a team in the Brightlingsea & District League. The following season they entered another team into the Braintree & District League. After playing in three leagues during the 1937–38 season, they left the Brightlingsea & District League and remained members of the other two for 1938–39.

After World War II the club spent the 1945–46 season in the Colchester & District Combination before rejoining the North Essex League in 1946. They won Division Two in 1946–47 and were promoted the following season. In 1949 they switched to Division One of the Colchester & East Essex League, which they won at the first attempt, earning promotion to the Premier Division. In 1956 they were relegated back to Division One. However, they won Division One in 1960–61 and the Premier Division in 1961–62. After winning the Premier Division they moved up to Division One of the Essex & Suffolk Border League. They finished as runners-up in their first season and were promoted to the Premier Division.

In 1971 they were founder members of the Essex Senior League and in 1979 moved to the Eastern Counties League. They almost won the league at the first attempt, but a failure to win on the last day of the season meant that they lost the title to Gorleston by a single point. However, they did win the title two years later, a season in which they also won the league cup. They went on to win the league cup again in 1984–85 and 1985–86. The club was relegated to Division One at the end of the 1997–98 season but returned to the Premier Division as Division One champions in 1999–2000. In 2001–02 they reached the final of the FA Vase, but lost 1–0 after extra time to Whitley Bay at Villa Park.

In 2003–04 they were relegated to Division One again but a second Division One title in 2007–08 saw them return to the Premier Division. In 2009 the club switched to the Essex Senior League and in September that year the club's chairman took over nearby Isthmian League club Maldon Town, effectively combining the two clubs. The club's Chapel Road ground was sold and the team played the remainder of the 2009–10 season at Maldon's Wallace Binder ground. The club's final game was a 3–1 defeat by Enfield 1893 on 24 April 2010. In the 2010 close season, Tiptree withdrew from the Essex Senior League and were amalgamated into Maldon Town to form Maldon & Tiptree.

== Ground ==
The club played at Chapel Road from its establishment until 2009. The site had been offered to the club by HR Rothon, one of their founders. Chapel Road's record attendance of 1,912 was set on 30 March 2002 when Tiptree played AFC Sudbury in the second leg of an FA Vase semi-final.

In 2001 the club planned to leave the ground for a new one at Brook Meadow in Perry Road, but the plans did not gain approval. Prior to the merger with Maldon the club had planned to move to a ground on Colchester Road. The site was already owned by the club and was home to (a reformed) Tiptree Heath, then playing in the Essex & Suffolk Border League.

== Honours ==
- Eastern Counties League
  - Champions: 1981–82
  - Division One champions: 1999–2000, 2007–08
  - League Cup winners: 1981–82, 1984–85, 1985–86
  - Millennium Trophy winners: 2001–02
- Colchester & East Essex League
  - Premier Division champions: 1961–62
  - Division One champions: 1949–50, 1960–61
- North Essex League
  - Division Two champions: 1946–47
- Brightlingsea & District League
  - Champions: 1934–35
  - League Cup winners: 1934–35, 1935–36
- Braintree & District League
  - Champions: 1933–34

== Records ==
- FA Cup best performance: Second qualifying round 1986–87, 1991–92, 1994–95, 1998–99
- FA Vase best performance: Runners-up 2001–02
