= Norfolk County Football Association =

Area sporting organization with 19th century origins

- Purpose: Football association
- Headquarters: The FDC
- Location: Clover Hill Road, Norwich
- Chief Executive: Matt Carpenter
- Website: www.norfolkfa.com

The Norfolk County Football Association is the governing body for football in the county of Norfolk, England.

== History and Organisation ==
Norfolk County Football Association was founded in 1881 and has been administering football in the County, at both grass roots and professional level, for over 120 years.

For most of this time the work has been carried out on an honorary basis, however funding support from The Football Association led to the association becoming administered by a full-time secretariat in 1996.

On 24 August 1999 the association became a limited company, again at the behest of The Football Association. Since then The FA has taken a far greater interest in County Associations, working in partnership to provide increased sums of money to support new initiatives and staffing.

Since becoming a limited company, the structure of the association has changed significantly. The council oversees the implementation of policy through its committee structure in ‘football’ matters, including in the areas of Competitions, Discipline and Referees. The Board of Directors has responsibility for Financial and Commercial matters, whilst the staff at County Headquarters is responsible for implementing the decisions made by the two groups.

The association acquired the leasehold of a purpose-built football facility in Bowthorpe, Norwich in 2009 – the site becoming known as the Norfolk County FA Football Development Centre, or 'the FDC'. The Centre is a hub of both regulated and recreational activity for the football community of Norwich and Norfolk, offering a range of small sided and full sizes football facilities.

The work of the County Football Association is underpinned by an army of volunteers involved within the County's member leagues and clubs. Without their contribution, it would be impossible to organise and run football on the scale it is enjoyed in Norfolk today.

== Football Development ==
Norfolk County FA's Football Development team works towards improving every aspect of the grassroots game. Their day to day involvement includes:

- Developing and assisting local clubs towards the achievement of Charter Standard awards
- Developing volunteers through a wide variety of coach, medical and refereeing courses
- Developing facilities by working in conjunction with funding bodies such as The Football Foundation
- Developing football amongst children through involvement with schools and education programmes

== Affiliated Leagues ==
=== Men's Saturday Leagues ===
- Anglian Combination**
- Central and South Norfolk League
- North East Norfolk League
- North West Norfolk League

=== Other Leagues ===
- Norfolk Christian League
- Norfolk County FA Veterans League

=== Men's Sunday Leagues ===
- Norwich and District Sunday League

=== Small Sided Leagues ===
- County 5IVES
- Mundial
- Soccersixes.net
- Champion Soccer

=== Youth Leagues ===
- Mid Norfolk Youth League
- Norfolk Combined Youth League
- Norfolk Christian Youth League
- Norfolk and Suffolk Youth League

=== Women and Girls Leagues ===
- Norfolk Women's and Girls' League

== Disbanded or Amalgamated Leagues ==
A number of leagues that were affiliated to the Norfolk County FA have disbanded or amalgamated with other leagues including:

- Aldred League (forerunner of the Great Yarmouth and District League)
- Catton and District League (now part of the Central and South Norfolk League)
- Comrades League (a league that operated in the Great Yarmouth area during the latter part of World War I)
- Dereham and District League (now part of the Central and South Norfolk League)
- East Anglian League (amalgamated with the Norfolk and Suffolk League in 1964 to become the Anglian Combination)
- Great Yarmouth & District Saturday League
- Great Yarmouth Sunday League
- Great Yarmouth Borough League
- Norfolk and Suffolk League (amalgamated with the East Anglian League in 1964 to become the Anglian Combination)
- Norfolk Youth Football Combination League (amalgamated with the North East Norfolk Youth League and South Norfolk Youth League to become the Norfolk Combined Youth Football League)
- North East Norfolk Youth League (amalgamated with the South Norfolk Youth League and Norfolk Youth Football Combination League to become the Norfolk Combined Youth Football League)
- Norwich and District Saturday League (now part of the Central and South Norfolk League)
- Norwich and South Norfolk District League (now part of the Central and South Norfolk League)
- South Norfolk League
- South Norfolk Youth League (amalgamated with the North East Norfolk Youth League and Norfolk Youth Football Combination League to become the Norfolk Combined Youth Football League)
- Thetford and District Sunday Football League (now known as the Breckland and District Sunday Football League)
- Thetford and District Youth League
- Waveney Youth League

== Affiliated Member Clubs ==
Among the notable clubs that are (or were at one time) affiliated to the Norfolk County FA are:

- Cromer Town
- Dereham Town
- Diss Town
- Downham Town
- Fakenham Town (now defunct)
- Great Yarmouth Town
- Gorleston
- Gothic (now defunct)
- King's Lynn (now defunct)
- King's Lynn Town
- Norwich CEYMS
- Norwich City
- Norwich United
- Sheringham
- Swaffham Town
- Thetford Town
- Watton United
- Wroxham
- Wymondham Town

== County Cup Competitions ==
The Norfolk County FA run the following Cup Competitions:

Saturday Open Age Male

- Norfolk Senior Cup
- Norfolk Junior Cup
- Norfolk Intermediate Cup
- Norfolk Primary Cup

Sunday Open Age Male

- Norfolk Sunday Senior Cup
- Norfolk Sunday Junior Cup

Youth

- John Savage Cup
- Stuart Dracup Cup
- Norfolk U12s Cup

Other

- Norfolk Veterans Cup
- Norfolk Women's Cup

== List of recent Norfolk County Cup Winners ==
Season	Norfolk Senior Cup Winners	Norfolk Junior Cup Winners	Norfolk Primary Cup Winners
2004–05	Diss Town	Dersingham Rovers	East Harling
2005–06	Dereham Town	Caister United	Dereham Posties
2006–07	Dereham Town	Norwich United Reserves	Dereham Posties
2007–08	Wroxham	Horsford United	Lynn Docklands
2008–09	King's Lynn Reserves	Norwich St Johns	Docking Rangers
2009–10	Mattishall	West Lynn Sports & Social Club	Old Hunstanton
2010–11	Dereham Town	UEA	Hopton
2011–12	Gorleston	Reffley Royals	Haven Bridge United
2012–13	Norwich City U21	Catfield	Scarning United
2013–14	Gorleston	Catfield	One Love United
2014–15	Wroxham	Castle Acre Swifts	Dereham Taverners
2015–16	Dereham Town	Mundford	Dereham Taverners
2016–17	King's Lynn Town	UEA	Dereham Taverners
2017–18	Norwich United	Dussindale Rovers	Gayton United Reserves
2018–19	Dereham Town	Gorleston Reserves	Celt Rangers
2019–20	Not completed due to COVID-19 pandemic	Not completed due to COVID-19 pandemic	Not completed due to COVID-19 pandemic
2020–21	Gorleston	Wells Town	Upwell Town
2021–22	Mulbarton Wanderers	Wymondham Town	Sprowston A
2022–23	Gorleston	Loddon United	AG Hingham
2023–24	Downham Town	Watlington Sports & Social Club	Hockering
2024–25	Norwich City Under-21s	Norton Athletic	FC Viking
2025–26	Mulbarton Wanderers	Attleborough Town	Attleborough Town A

== Directors & Officials ==
=== Board of directors ===
- Michael Banham (Chairman)
- Matt Carpenter (Chief Executive)
- Oluwatobiloba Amadasun
- Paul Ballard
- Joe Conway
- Kathryn Hirst
- Ashley Judd
- Paul Marshall
- Gary Dack

=== Key Officials ===
- Matt Carpenter (Chief Executive)
- Rachel Cossey (Head of Football Delivery)
- Michelle Stewart (Head of Facilities)
- Rebecca Burton (Head of Marketing, Communication & Partnerships
- Ben Stokes (FDCs Manager)
