= 2024–25 FA Cup qualifying rounds =

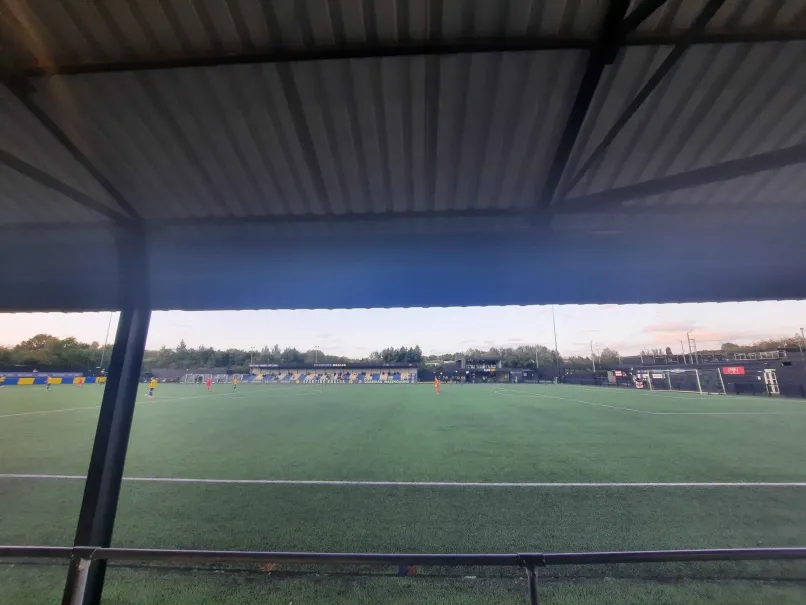
- Sporting Khalsa 2–0 Gresley Rovers, Preliminary round replay, 20 August 2024

Tournament details
- Country: England; Wales
- Dates: 2 August – 15 October 2024
- Teams: 653

The 2024–25 FA Cup qualifying rounds opened the 144th edition of the FA Cup, the world's oldest association football single knockout competition, organised by The Football Association, the governing body for the sport in England. 653 teams in the 5th to 9th tier of English football competed across six rounds for 32 spots in the 2024–25 FA Cup first round proper.

== Eligibility ==
The qualifying rounds were the point of entry into the FA Cup for all "non-League" teams—teams below the top four tiers of English football, and therefore outside the English Football League (EFL). These teams competed in leagues below the EFL which constitute the National League System. The number of teams entered in the FA Cup overall rose from 732 in 2023-24 to 745 the following season due to an increase in the number of teams in the 9th tier. Because of this increase, teams from the 10th tier were no longer accepted into the competition, so the 2024–25 qualifying rounds encompassed all teams that entered from the 5th to 9th tiers—steps 1 to 5 of the National League System.

== Calendar ==
Round	Main date	Leagues entering this round	New entries this round	Winners from the previous round	Number of fixtures	Prize fund	
Round	Main date	Leagues entering this round	New entries this round	Winners from the previous round	Number of fixtures	Losing club	Winning club
Extra preliminary round	3 August 2024	Level 9 Level 8 (32 newly promoted clubs and 91 lowest ranked clubs by points per game from 23/24)	442	None	221	£375	£1,125
Preliminary round	17 August 2024	Level 8 (Remaining clubs)	52	221	136	£481	£1,444
First qualifying round	31 August 2024	Level 7	88	136	112	£750	£2,250
Second qualifying round	14 September 2024	National League North; National League South	48	112	80	£1,125	£3,375
Third qualifying round	28 September 2024	None	0	80	40	£1,875	£5,625
Fourth qualifying round	12 October 2024	National League	24	40	32	£3,125	£9,375

== Extra preliminary round ==
The draw for the extra preliminary round was made on 5 July 2024.

Tie	Home team (Tier) (Note: (9) represents teams allocated to divisions at the 9th tier of English football (otherwise known as Step 5 of the National League System). (8) represents the 8th tier (Step 4 NLS).)	Score	Away team (Tier)	Att.
Friday 2 August 2024
7	Whickham (9)	1–0	Carlisle City (9)	192
11	Heaton Stannington (8)	2–0	Easington Colliery (9)	603
90	Great Yarmouth Town (9)	2–0	Kirkley & Pakefield (9)	362
101	Stansted (9)	0–0	Biggleswade (8)	434
149	Royal Wootton Bassett Town (9)	2–1	Mangotsfield United (9)	220
181	Spelthorne Sports (9)	0–1	Burgess Hill Town (8)	270
22	AFC Liverpool (9)	2–1	Abbey Hey (9)	187
32	Albion Sports (9)	1–2	Trafford (8)	182
87	Sheringham (9)	2–1	Woodbridge Town (9)	110
Saturday 3 August 2024
136	Binfield (8)	3–1	Wokingham Town (9)	310
1	Crook Town (9)	4–1	Marske United (9)	246
2	Consett (8)	2–3	Redcar Athletic (9)	277
3	West Auckland Town (9)	0–2	Bishop Auckland (8)	486
4	Newcastle Benfield (9)	3–0	Knaresborough Town (9)	213
5	Garforth Town (8)	2–0	Northallerton Town (9)	294
6	Kendal Town (9)	2–2	Guisborough Town (9)	342
8	Boro Rangers (9)	3–0	West Allotment Celtic (9)	116
9	Shildon (9)	2–4	Ashington (8)	220
12	Birtley Town (9)	3–2	Bridlington Town (8)	228
13	Tow Law Town (9)	2–3	Blyth Town (9)	150
14	North Shields (9)	1–2	Newcastle Blue Star (9)	568
15	Tadcaster Albion (9)	3–0	Seaham Red Star (9)	174
16	Penrith (9)	3–0	Pickering Town (9)	210
17	Colne (9)	0–4	Mossley (8)	237
18	Longridge Town (9)	2–0	Cheadle Town (9)	189
19	Sheffield (8)	2–1	Nantwich Town (8)	318
20	Ossett United (8)	0–1	Widnes (8)	275
21	Vauxhall Motors (8)	1–1	Eccleshill United (9)	159
23	Wythenshawe Town (8)	7–1	Chadderton (9)	238
24	Whitchurch Alport (9)	3–0	Irlam (9)	125
25	Thackley (9)	2–0	Frickley Athletic (9)	231
26	Stocksbridge Park Steels (8)	2–1	Prestwich Heys (9)	168
27	West Didsbury & Chorlton (9)	3–2	Burscough (9)	756
28	Penistone Church (9)	1–2	Charnock Richard (9)	321
29	Ramsbottom United (9)	1–3	Stalybridge Celtic (8)	455
30	Barnoldswick Town (9)	0–0	Brighouse Town (8)	201
31	Liversedge (8)	0–2	Silsden (9)	256
33	Campion (9)	1–0	Parkgate (9)	133
34	Padiham (9)	1–1	Golcar United (9)	284
35	Wythenshawe (8)	0–0	Pilkington (9)	271
36	Northwich Victoria (9)	3–2	Squires Gate (9)	230
37	Handsworth (9)	2–2	South Liverpool (9)	187
38	Congleton Town (8)	2–4	Bury (9)	731
40	Stockport Town (9)	1–2	1874 Northwich (9)	207
41	Litherland REMYCA (9)	1–3	Glossop North End (9)	120
43	Brocton (9)	3–2	Tividale (9)	209
44	Wolverhampton Casuals (9)	0–3	Rugby Town (8)	131
45	Lutterworth Town (9)	3–2	Studley (9)	41
46	Coventry Sphinx (8)	0–1	Ashby Ivanhoe (9)	121
47	OJM Community (9)	1–2	Chasetown (8)	150
48	Rugby Borough (9)	0–4	Darlaston Town (1874) (8)	97
49	Kidsgrove Athletic (8)	2–0	Pershore Town (9)	192
50	AFC Wulfrunians (9)	1–2	Atherstone Town (9)	141
51	Sporting Khalsa (8)	3–0	Coventry United (9)	127
52	Sutton Coldfield Town (8)	2–0	Romulus (9)	188
53	Hinckley (9)	3–1	Highgate United (9)	227
54	Westfields (9)	1–0	Daventry Town (9)	148
55	Worcester Raiders (9)	2–0	Stourport Swifts (9)	650
56	Racing Club Warwick (8)	1–4	Hednesford Town (8)	474
57	Stone Old Alleynians (9)	2–1	Bedworth United (8)	89
58	Hanley Town (8)	1–1	Boldmere St. Michaels (8)	190
59	Worcester City (8)	0–0	Walsall Wood (8)	650
60	Uttoxeter Town (9)	2–3	Heanor Town (9)	222
61	Shifnal Town (9)	3–0	Belper United (9)	145
62	Malvern Town (8)	2–1	Hereford Pegasus (9)	227
63	Sporting Club Inkberrow (9)	0–3	Dudley Town (9)	592
64	Evesham United (8)	1–1	Newcastle Town (8)	241
65	Coleshill Town (8)	0–0	Eastwood (9)	60
66	Gresley Rovers (9)	4–2	Lichfield City (9)	282
67	Corby Town (8)	1–1	AFC Rushden & Diamonds (8)	845
68	Grimsby Borough (8)	3–0	GNG Oadby Town (9)	145
69	Leicester Nirvana (9)	0–6	Northampton ON Chenecks (9)	53
70	Rossington Main (9)	0–3	AFC Mansfield (9)	208
71	Shirebrook Town (9)	1–2	Deeping Rangers (9)	159
72	Bourne Town (9)	0–1	Aylestone Park (9)	284
73	Yaxley (9)	2–1	Godmanchester Rovers (9)	173
74	Barton Town (9)	5–2	Newark Town (9)	239
75	Lincoln United (9)	2–3	Goole (9)	166
76	Melton Town (9)	2–0	Harrowby United (9)	251
77	Shepshed Dynamo (8)	0–3	Winterton Rangers (9)	165
78	Sherwood Colliery (8)	1–1	Grantham Town (8)	163
79	Kimberley Miners Welfare (9)	0–7	Cleethorpes Town (8)	222
80	Skegness Town (9)	1–3	Newark and Sherwood United (9)	206
81	Wellingborough Town (8)	1–1	Sleaford Town (9)	187
82	Bugbrooke St Michaels (9)	0–2	Loughborough Students (8)	86
83	Northampton Sileby Rangers (9)	1–1	Boston Town (9)	230
84	Hucknall Town (9)	2–3	Bottesford Town (9)	269
85	Dereham Town (9)	1–1	Wisbech Town (9)	184
86	Ely City (9)	1–1	Mulbarton Wanderers (9)	112
89	Harleston Town (9)	4–0	Heacham (9)	138
91	Wroxham (8)	1–1	Walsham-le-Willows (9)	181
92	Thetford Town (9)	0–0	Ipswich Wanderers (8)	158
Match played at Ipswich Wanderers
93	Stowmarket Town (9)	2–1	Histon (9)	341
94	Cornard United (9)	3–0	Fakenham Town (9)	60
95	Newmarket Town (8)	3–1	March Town United (9)	216
96	Gorleston (8)	2–0	Hadleigh United (9)	103
97	Long Melford (9)	1–4	Downham Town (9)	
98	Soham Town Rangers (9)	4–1	Mildenhall Town (8)	216
99	Great Wakering Rovers (9)	2–2	Redbridge (8)	150
100	Newport Pagnell Town (9)	3–3	Ilford (9)	235
102	Leverstock Green (8)	3–1	Baldock Town (9)	121
103	Eynesbury Rovers (9)	2–2	Romford (9)	126
104	Tring Athletic (9)	1–1	Barking (9)	194
105	Biggleswade United (9)	2–2	Frenford (9)	183
106	Milton Keynes Irish (9)	2–0	Welwyn Garden City (8)	214
107	Witham Town (8)	2–1	Hertford Town (8)	155
108	London Lions (9)	4–0	Arlesey Town (9)	45
109	Colney Heath (9)	1–2	Takeley (9)	112
110	Cockfosters (9)	1–1	Kings Langley (8)	184
111	Sawbridgeworth Town (9)	0–5	FC Romania (9)	66
112	Real Bedford (8)	2–3	St Neots Town (9)	351
113	West Essex (9)	0–1	Enfield (8)	187
114	Little Oakley (9)	3–1	Dunstable Town (9)	99
115	Basildon United (8)	2–1	Hadley (8)	89
116	Shefford Town & Campton (9)	0–2	Brantham Athletic (9)	54
117	FC Clacton (9)	0–6	Leighton Town (8)	116
118	Kempston Rovers (9)	2–4	Brightlingsea Regent (8)	124
119	Potton United (9)	1–3	White Ensign (9)	131
120	Barton Rovers (8)	1–1	Saffron Walden Town (9)	115
121	Heybridge Swifts (8)	2–1	Wormley Rovers (9)	206
122	Benfleet (9)	3–1	Woodford Town (9)	347
124	Edgware & Kingsbury (9)	2–2	Crawley Green (9)	74
125	Stanway Rovers (9)	0–0	Maldon & Tiptree (8)	170
126	Tilbury (8)	4–1	Buckhurst Hill (9)	223
127	Harpenden Town (9)	3–1	Halstead Town (9)	120
128	Portishead Town (9)	0–1	Easington Sports (9)	131
Match played at Hallen
129	Tuffley Rovers (9)	0–3	Kidlington (8)	141
130	Malmesbury Victoria (9)	1–3	Slimbridge (9)	138
Match played at Slimbridge
131	Reading City (9)	3–2	Ardley United (9)	139
132	Lydney Town (9)	5–1	Thornbury Town (9)	147
133	Burnham (9)	3–3	Corsham Town (9)	70
134	Brislington (9)	0–2	Wallingford & Crowmarsh (9)	58
135	Flackwell Heath (8)	0–1	Aylesbury Vale Dynamos (9)	256
137	Longlevens (9)	1–1	Winslow United (9)	124
138	Cinderford Town (8)	1–2	Nailsea & Tickenham (9)	169
139	Virginia Water (9)	4–2	Brimscombe & Thrupp (9)	79
140	Ascot United (8)	1–0	Milton United (9)	229
141	Thame United (8)	3–0	Aylesbury United (8)	250

Tie	Home team (Tier)	Score	Away team (Tier)	Att.
142	Oldland Abbotonians (9)	2–4	Amersham Town (9)	78
143	Highworth Town (9)	0–1	Bishop's Cleeve (8)	134
144	Roman Glass St George (9)	2–0	North Leigh (8)	60
145	Fairford Town (9)	7–0	Cirencester Town (9)	240
146	Hartpury University (9)	2–0	Risborough Rangers (9)	88
147	Yate Town (8)	2–0	Holyport (9)	286
150	British Airways (9)	0–0	Loxwood (9)	111
151	Horsham YMCA (9)	5–1	Newhaven (9)	119
152	Larkfield & New Hythe Wanderers (9)	2–1	Kennington (9)	251
153	Rayners Lane (8)	3–1	Broadfields United (9)	94
155	Cobham (9)	3–4	Uxbridge (8)	112
156	Chipstead (9)	0–2	Athletic Newham (9)	65
158	Hanworth Villa (8)	4–0	Knaphill (9)	161
159	Deal Town (8)	4–0	Roffey (9)	567
160	Epsom & Ewell (9)	0–0	Phoenix Sports (8)	148
161	Saltdean United (9)	3–2	AFC Varndeanians (9)	167
162	North Greenford United (9)	1–1	Corinthian-Casuals (9)	105
163	Steyning Town (8)	4–0	Hilltop (9)	105
164	Merstham (8)	7–0	Wick (9)	232
165	Wembley (9)	0–2	Bedfont Sports (9)	90
166	Abbey Rangers (9)	2–2	Hythe Town (8)	137
167	Punjab United (9)	2–0	Snodland Town (9)	112
168	Hassocks (9)	2–3	Haywards Heath Town (9)	372
169	Broadbridge Heath (8)	2–1	Horley Town (9)	172
170	Badshot Lea (8)	1–0	Stansfeld (9)	90
171	Sevenoaks Town (8)	2–1	Whitstable Town (9)	253
172	Fisher (9)	2–5	Redhill (9)	217
173	Tunbridge Wells (9)	1–3	Farnham Town (8)	307
174	Balham (9)	3–1	Midhurst & Easebourne (9)	126
175	Holmesdale (9)	0–1	Crawley Down Gatwick (9)	62
176	Lordswood (9)	1–0	Erith & Belvedere (9)	130
177	Eastbourne Town (8)	2–0	Little Common (9)	188
178	Ashford United (8)	3–0	Egham Town (9)	414
179	Bexhill United (9)	0–1	Faversham Town (9)	152
180	Northwood (8)	0–2	Ashford Town (Middlesex) (8)	179
182	Camberley Town (9)	2–1	Lydd Town (9)	76
183	Sheerwater (9)	1–1	Rusthall (9)	181
184	Beckenham Town (8)	1–3	Harefield United (9)	128
185	Lingfield (9)	1–0	Hollands & Blair (9)	167
Match played at Hollands & Blair
186	AFC Croydon Athletic (8)	3–1	Guildford City (9)	195
187	South Park (8)	3–1	Sutton Common Rovers (8)	146
188	Corinthian (9)	2–0	AFC Whyteleafe (9)	102
189	Sutton Athletic (9)	1–2	Sandhurst Town (9)	65
190	Erith Town (8)	6–2	Pagham (9)	104
191	Glebe (9)	0–2	East Grinstead Town (8)	172
Match played at East Grinstead Town
192	Metropolitan Police (8)	1–3	VCD Athletic (9)	64
193	Eastbourne United (9)	4–0	Sporting Bengal United (8)	52
194	Crowborough Athletic (9)	1–1	Bearsted (9)	193
195	Tadley Calleva (9)	2–3	Millbrook (Hampshire) (9)	185
196	Fareham Town (9)	1–1	Sherborne Town (9)	231
197	AFC Portchester (9)	5–1	United Services Portsmouth (9)	271
198	Melksham Town (8)	3–0	Welton Rovers (9)	216
199	Thatcham Town (8)	3–1	Christchurch (9)	142
200	Bournemouth (9)	0–4	Shaftesbury (8)	118
201	Portland United (9)	0–2	Hamworthy Recreation (9)	182
202	Baffins Milton Rovers (9)	5–0	Petersfield Town (9)	226
203	Hamble Club (9)	0–0	Westbury United (8)	136
204	Alton (9)	1–1	Fleet Town (9)	326
205	Andover New Street (9)	4–2	Hythe & Dibden (9)	150
206	Laverstock & Ford (9)	1–1	Cowes Sports (9)	84
207	Bemerton Heath Harlequins (8)	1–1	Brockenhurst (9)	137
208	Hartley Wintney (8)	3–0	Downton (9)	185
209	Shepton Mallet (9)	1–0	Horndean (8)	236
210	Moneyfields (8)	1–2	AFC Stoneham (9)	218
211	Paulton Rovers (9)	2–1	Bashley (8)	156
212	Wincanton Town (9)	2–1	Blackfield & Langley (9)	112
213	Falmouth Town (8)	5–0	Torpoint Athletic (9)	380
214	Exmouth Town (8)	1–0	Street (9)	303
215	Ilfracombe Town (9)	0–2	Tavistock (8)	97
216	St Blazey (9)	1–3	Ivybridge Town (9)	220
217	Barnstaple Town (9)	3–3	Helston Athletic (8)	162
218	Brixham (9)	2–0	Saltash United (9)	158
219	Willand Rovers (8)	2–0	AFC St Austell (9)	143
220	Wellington (9)	1–0	Buckland Athletic (9)	182
Match played at Buckland Athletic
221	Bideford (8)	1–0	Bridgwater United (9)	328
Sunday 4 August 2024
123	Grays Athletic (8)	5–1	Hullbridge Sports (9)	290
148	Berks County (9)	1–4	Clevedon Town (9)	234
39	Hallam (9)	2–1	Lower Breck (9)	679
42	Emley (8)	1–0	FC St Helens (9)	420
88	Cambridge City (8)	5–1	Lakenheath (9)	220
10	Beverley Town (9)	2–3	Whitley Bay (9)	912
154	Littlehampton Town (8)	1–0	Tooting & Mitcham United (9)	339
157	Peacehaven & Telscombe (9)	0–2	Shoreham (9)	168
Match played at Eastbourne Town
Replays
Monday 5 August 2024
99R	Redbridge (8)	1–0	Great Wakering Rovers (9)	149
101R	Biggleswade (8)	2–1	Stansted (9)	139
Tuesday 6 August 2024
194R	Bearsted (9)	1–2 (a.e.t.)	Crowborough Athletic (9)	199
34R	Golcar United (9)	1–0	Padiham (9)	346
58R	Boldmere St. Michaels (8)	0–0 (2–4 p)	Hanley Town (8)	177
59R	Walsall Wood (8)	A–A (Note: The match was abandoned during the second half due to persistent issues with the floodlights (the score was 0–0 when the match was abandoned).)	Worcester City (8)	
64R	Newcastle Town (8)	3–2	Evesham United (8)	195
67R	AFC Rushden & Diamonds (8)	1–1 (2–1 p)	Corby Town (8)	714
78R	Grantham Town (8)	4–0	Sherwood Colliery (8)	243
83R	Boston Town (9)	1–0	Northampton Sileby Rangers (9)	160
85R	Wisbech Town (9)	0–1	Dereham Town (9)	240
86R	Mulbarton Wanderers (9)	2–1 (a.e.t.)	Ely City (9)	152
91R	Walsham-le-Willows (9)	0–2	Wroxham (8)	115
92R	Ipswich Wanderers (8)	1–0	Thetford Town (9)	104
104R	Barking (9)	1–0	Tring Athletic (9)	108
105R	Frenford (9)	2–4 (a.e.t.)	Biggleswade United (9)	121
110R	Kings Langley (8)	1–0	Cockfosters (9)	176
120R	Saffron Walden Town (9)	2–1	Barton Rovers (8)	232
124R	Crawley Green (9)	1–1 (4–5 p)	Edgware & Kingsbury (9)	90
125R	Maldon & Tiptree (8)	1–2	Stanway Rovers (9)	171
133R	Corsham Town (9)	2–0	Burnham (9)	271
137R	Winslow United (9)	1–3 (a.e.t.)	Longlevens (9)	194
150R	Loxwood (9)	3–1	British Airways (9)	105
160R	Phoenix Sports (8)	1–3	Epsom & Ewell (9)	108
162R	Corinthian-Casuals (9)	0–1 (a.e.t.)	North Greenford United (9)	271
166R	Hythe Town (8)	2–3	Abbey Rangers (9)	138
183R	Rusthall (9)	4–1	Sheerwater (9)	248
203R	Westbury United (8)	1–0	Hamble Club (9)	152
204R	Fleet Town (9)	4–1	Alton (9)	425
206R	Cowes Sports (9)	1–3	Laverstock & Ford (9)	135
207R	Brockenhurst (9)	0–1	Bemerton Heath Harlequins (8)	249
217R	Helston Athletic (8)	0–2	Barnstaple Town (9)	143
65R	Eastwood (9)	1–3 (a.e.t.)	Coleshill Town (8)	136
Wednesday 7 August 2024
6R	Guisborough Town (9)	1–2	Kendal Town (9)	342
21R	Eccleshill United (9)	3–2	Vauxhall Motors (8)	183
30R	Brighouse Town (8)	2–2 (3–5 p)	Barnoldswick Town (9)	187
35R	Pilkington (9)	3–1	Wythenshawe (8)	167
37R	South Liverpool (9)	2–0	Handsworth (9)	287
81R	Sleaford Town (9)	2–2 (4–5 p)	Wellingborough Town (8)	201
100R	Ilford (9)	Void (Note: The match had to be replayed due to a county FA admin error which led to the initial 3–0 win for Newport Pagnell Town to become void, causing a second replay to be scheduled.)	Newport Pagnell Town (9)	42
103R	Romford (9)	3–2	Eynesbury Rovers (9)	141
196R	Sherborne Town (9)	2–0	Fareham Town (9)	237
Tuesday 13 August 2024
59R	Worcester City (8)	1–0	Walsall Wood (8)	466
100R	Newport Pagnell Town (9)	2–0	Ilford (9)	130

== Preliminary round ==
The draw for the preliminary round was made on 5 July 2024, following the draw for the extra preliminary round. This round saw the remaining teams from Tier 8 enter the competition.

Tie	Home team (Tier) (Note: (9) represents teams allocated to divisions at the 9th tier of English football (otherwise known as Step 5 of the National League System). (8) represents the 8th tier (Step 4 NLS).)	Score	Away team (Tier)	Att.
Friday 16 August 2024
25	Golcar United (9)	0–1	Thackley (9)	200
39	Hinckley (9)	2–5	Malvern Town (8)	271
Saturday 17 August 2024
10	Ashington (8)	1–1	Bishop Auckland (8)	478
1	Garforth Town (8)	1–1	Heaton Stannington (8)	240
2	Newcastle Blue Star (9)	1–1	North Ferriby (8)	268
3	Newton Aycliffe (8)	3–0	Whitley Bay (9)	166
4	Boro Rangers (9)	0–1	Tadcaster Albion (9)	125
5	Blyth Town (9)	0–2	Birtley Town (9)	93
7	Kendal Town (9)	1–2	Newcastle Benfield (9)	282
8	Pontefract Collieries (8)	3–0	Redcar Athletic (9)	269
9	Penrith (9)	2–3	Crook Town (9)	202
11	Longridge Town (9)	1–3	1874 Northwich (9)	219
12	Stalybridge Celtic (8)	0–1	Widnes (8)	469
13	Runcorn Linnets (8)	2–2	Wythenshawe Town (8)	374
15	Trafford (8)	0–3	Emley (8)	489
16	South Liverpool (9)	1–1	Witton Albion (8)	237
17	Silsden (9)	2–0	Atherton Collieries (8)	172
19	Barnoldswick Town (9)	1–1	Northwich Victoria (9)	158
20	Clitheroe (8)	2–2	Sheffield (8)	504
21	Avro (8)	1–2	Bury (9)	917
22	Bootle (8)	1–3	City of Liverpool (8)	467
23	Bradford (Park Avenue) (8)	2–3	Stocksbridge Park Steels (8)	238
24	Mossley (8)	0–0	Eccleshill United (9)	328
26	Glossop North End (9)	1–2	West Didsbury & Chorlton (9)	422
27	Whitchurch Alport (9)	3–1	Pilkington (9)	139
28	Atherstone Town (9)	0–6	Kidsgrove Athletic (8)	201
29	Rugby Town (8)	3–0	Stone Old Alleynians (9)	206
30	Hanley Town (8)	0–1	Stafford Rangers (8)	259
31	Brocton (9)	0–1	Coleshill Town (8)	159
32	Worcester Raiders (9)	0–1	Hednesford Town (8)	788
Match played at Hednesford Town
33	Westfields (9)	1–1	Newcastle Town (8)	183
34	Heanor Town (9)	3–2	Hinckley LR (8)	140
35	Worcester City (8)	1–2	Dudley Town (9)	554
36	Belper Town (8)	3–1	Lutterworth Town (9)	342
37	Shifnal Town (9)	1–0	Sutton Coldfield Town (8)	164
38	Chasetown (8)	0–1	Ashby Ivanhoe (9)	399
40	Gresley Rovers (9)	1–1	Sporting Khalsa (8)	216
41	Darlaston Town (1874) (8)	3–0	Lye Town (8)	164
42	AFC Mansfield (9)	1–3	Carlton Town (8)	81
43	Aylestone Park (9)	0–2	Wellingborough Town (8)	142
44	Yaxley (9)	1–3	Grantham Town (8)	207
45	Newark and Sherwood United (9)	2–0	AFC Rushden & Diamonds (8)	205
46	Long Eaton United (8)	3–2	Boston Town (9)	149
47	Cleethorpes Town (8)	4–0	Quorn (8)	152
48	Bottesford Town (9)	3–0	Winterton Rangers (9)	236
49	Northampton ON Chenecks (9)	2–3	Barton Town (9)	100
50	Grimsby Borough (8)	0–5	Anstey Nomads (8)	82
51	Goole (9)	2–3	Melton Town (9)	210
52	Deeping Rangers (9)	2–2	Loughborough Students (8)	140
53	Mulbarton Wanderers (9)	1–3	Gorleston (8)	83
54	Bury Town (8)	2–2	Felixstowe & Walton United (8)	465
55	Stowmarket Town (9)	1–5	Cornard United (9)	258
56	Soham Town Rangers (9)	2–2	Harleston Town (9)	147
57	Wroxham (8)	1–3	Newmarket Town (8)	128
58	Downham Town (9)	1–3	Ipswich Wanderers (8)	62
59	Great Yarmouth Town (9)	2–1	Cambridge City (8)	326
60	Dereham Town (9)	1–3	Sheringham (9)	175
61	Tilbury (8)	3–1	Stanway Rovers (9)	204
62	White Ensign (9)	1–3	Brantham Athletic (9)	68
63	St Neots Town (9)	3–0	Edgware & Kingsbury (9)	248
64	Concord Rangers (8)	1–3	Milton Keynes Irish (9)	151
65	Benfleet (9)	1–5	Haringey Borough (8)	322
66	Newport Pagnell Town (9)	0–1	AFC Dunstable (8)	261
67	Leighton Town (8)	2–3	Waltham Abbey (8)	296
68	Biggleswade United (9)	1–2	Enfield (8)	134
69	Biggleswade (8)	3–1	London Lions (9)	88
70	Leverstock Green (8)	1–1	Heybridge Swifts (8)	89
71	Stotfold (8)	1–0	Takeley (9)	151
73	Walthamstow (8)	3–2	Saffron Walden Town (9)	229
74	Ware (8)	0–1	Brentwood Town (8)	221
75	Redbridge (8)	0–1	Barking (9)	133
76	Harpenden Town (9)	1–0	FC Romania (9)	142
77	Little Oakley (9)	1–4	Berkhamsted (8)	86
78	Basildon United (8)	1–0	Kings Langley (8)	78
79	Brightlingsea Regent (8)	4–0	Romford (9)	190
80	Royal Wootton Bassett Town (9)	0–2	Didcot Town (8)	158
81	Thame United (8)	5–0	Beaconsfield Town (8)	102
82	Aylesbury Vale Dynamos (9)	3–2	Corsham Town (9)	188
83	Cribbs (8)	2–0	Roman Glass St George (9)	130
84	Amersham Town (9)	4–1	Clevedon Town (9)	109
85	Wallingford & Crowmarsh (9)	3–0	Slimbridge (9)	131
86	Reading City (9)	1–1	Nailsea & Tickenham (9)	144
87	Kidlington (8)	0–4	Yate Town (8)	136
88	Virginia Water (9)	2–1	Ascot United (8)	206
89	Fairford Town (9)	1–5	Hartpury University (9)	129

Tie	Home team (Tier)	Score	Away team (Tier)	Att.
90	Longlevens (9)	1–9	Binfield (8)	134
91	Bishop's Cleeve (8)	4–0	Lydney Town (9)	166
92	Easington Sports (9)	3–1	Bristol Manor Farm (8)	100
93	Sevenoaks Town (8)	0–2	Leatherhead (8)	319
94	Steyning Town (8)	3–1	Crawley Down Gatwick (9)	109
95	Ashford Town (Middlesex) (8)	1–1	Uxbridge (8)	79
96	Crowborough Athletic (9)	0–1	South Park (8)	135
97	Harrow Borough (8)	1–1	Ashford United (8)	192
98	Ramsgate (8)	5–0	Southall (8)	735
99	Horsham YMCA (9)	1–3	Broadbridge Heath (8)	100
100	North Greenford United (9)	0–3	Sheppey United (8)	75
101	AFC Croydon Athletic (8)	4–0	VCD Athletic (9)	139
102	Herne Bay (8)	2–2	Rayners Lane (8)	294
103	Corinthian (9)	3–1	Camberley Town (9)	96
104	Kingstonian (8)	3–2	Eastbourne United (9)	219
105	Margate (8)	4–0	Loxwood (9)	342
106	Epsom & Ewell (9)	1–3	Hayes & Yeading United (8)	157
107	Harefield United (9)	3–0	Sandhurst Town (9)	105
108	Lordswood (9)	3–1	Shoreham (9)	98
109	Merstham (8)	2–1	Erith Town (8)	267
110	Saltdean United (9)	0–0	Three Bridges (8)	131
111	Haywards Heath Town (9)	2–0	Deal Town (8)	279
112	Hanworth Villa (8)	4–1	Abbey Rangers (9)	216
113	Larkfield & New Hythe Wanderers (9)	3–1	Lingfield (9)	155
115	Farnham Town (8)	2–4	Sittingbourne (8)	455
116	Bedfont Sports (9)	2–3	Raynes Park Vale (8)	94
117	Badshot Lea (8)	4–1	Balham (9)	62
118	Lancing (8)	2–4	Athletic Newham (9)	235
119	Burgess Hill Town (8)	2–1	Eastbourne Town (8)	403
120	Rusthall (9)	1–2	Punjab United (9)	219
121	East Grinstead Town (8)	1–3	Redhill (9)	193
122	Thatcham Town (8)	1–2	Andover New Street (9)	159
123	Hartley Wintney (8)	0–2	Larkhall Athletic (8)	191
124	Wincanton Town (9)	2–2	Fleet Town (9)	140
125	Baffins Milton Rovers (9)	2–1	Shepton Mallet (9)	117
126	Bemerton Heath Harlequins (8)	1–3	Laverstock & Ford (9)	138
128	Shaftesbury (8)	0–0	Melksham Town (8)	
129	Westfield (8)	3–1	Sherborne Town (9)	120
130	AFC Stoneham (9)	1–1	Millbrook (Hampshire) (9)	132
131	Westbury United (8)	1–0	AFC Portchester (9)	175
132	Barnstaple Town (9)	4–1	Falmouth Town (8)	225
133	Mousehole (8)	2–2	Willand Rovers (8)	190
134	Exmouth Town (8)	A–A (Note: The match was suspended during the second half after a serious injury was suffered by an Exmouth Town player (the score was 3–0 when the match was suspended).)	Brixham (9)	350
135	Ivybridge Town (9)	0–1	Tavistock (8)	192
136	Bideford (8)	1–1	Wellington (9)	268
Sunday 18 August 2024
127	Hamworthy Recreation (9)	1–2	Paulton Rovers (9)	215
18	Hallam (9)	2–0	Charnock Richard (9)	703
6	Whickham (9)	1–1	Dunston (8)	956
14	Campion (9)	1–0	AFC Liverpool (9)	261
72	Grays Athletic (8)	1–4	Witham Town (8)	311
114	Littlehampton Town (8)	2–3	Faversham Town (9)	310
Replays
Monday 19 August 2024
128R	Melksham Town (8)	4–1	Shaftesbury (8)	231
Tuesday 20 August 2024
86R	Nailsea & Tickenham (9)	1–0	Reading City (9)	
2R	North Ferriby (8)	2–4 (a.e.t.)	Newcastle Blue Star (9)	383
10R	Bishop Auckland (8)	1–2 (a.e.t.)	Ashington (8)	600
13R	Wythenshawe Town (8)	3–1	Runcorn Linnets (8)	355
16R	Witton Albion (8)	3–1	South Liverpool (9)	420
19R	Northwich Victoria (9)	2–4	Barnoldswick Town (9)	154
20R	Sheffield (8)	3–2	Clitheroe (8)	243
33R	Newcastle Town (8)	2–0	Westfields (9)	105
40R	Sporting Khalsa (8)	2–0 (a.e.t.)	Gresley Rovers (9)	187
52R	Loughborough Students (8)	4–0	Deeping Rangers (9)	168
54R	Felixstowe & Walton United (8)	4–0	Bury Town (8)	446
56R	Harleston Town (9)	4–0	Soham Town Rangers (9)	198
70R	Heybridge Swifts (8)	1–1 (3–4 p)	Leverstock Green (8)	204
95R	Uxbridge (8)	1–2	Ashford Town (Middlesex) (8)	140
97R	Ashford United (8)	3–1	Harrow Borough (8)	355
102R	Rayners Lane (8)	1–2	Herne Bay (8)	105
110R	Three Bridges (8)	3–1	Saltdean United (9)	162
124R	Fleet Town (9)	4–1	Wincanton Town (9)	298
130R	Millbrook (Hampshire) (9)	A–A (Note: The match was abandoned at half-time due to a floodlight failure (the score was 0–1 when the match was abandoned).)	AFC Stoneham (9)	
136R	Wellington (9)	0–2	Bideford (8)	241
Match played at Bideford
Wednesday 21 August 2024
133R	Willand Rovers (8)	1–0	Mousehole (8)	177
1R	Heaton Stannington (8)	2–3 (a.e.t.)	Garforth Town (8)	502
6R	Dunston (8)	3–0	Whickham (9)	563
24R	Eccleshill United (9)	1–3	Mossley (8)	192
134R	Exmouth Town (8)	0–2	Brixham (9)	315
Tuesday 27 August 2024
130R	Millbrook (Hampshire) (9)	1–3	AFC Stoneham (9)	287

== First qualifying round ==
The draw for the first qualifying round was made on 19 August 2024. This round saw all teams from step three enter the competition.

Number of non-league teams per tier still in qualifying
National League (Note: National League teams joined in the fourth round of qualifying)	North/South (Note: National League North/South teams joined in the second round of qualifying.)	Premier Division	Division One	Regional	Total
24 / 24	48 / 48	88 / 88	80 / 80	56 / 56	296 / 296

Tie	Home team (Tier) (Note: (9) represents teams allocated to divisions at the 9th tier of English football (otherwise known as Step 5 of the National League System). (8) represents the 8th tier (Step 4 NLS). (7) represents the 7th tier (Step 3 NLS).)	Score	Away team (Tier)	Att.
Friday 30 August 2024
76	Hanworth Villa (8)	3–3	Walton & Hersham (7)	554
Saturday 31 August 2024
7	Campion (9)	1–1	Blyth Spartans (7)	572
1	Garforth Town (8)	0–2	Bury (9)	1,186
2	Crook Town (9)	2–1	Ashington (8)	376
3	Guiseley (7)	3–0	Ashton United (7)	415
4	Morpeth Town (7)	1–0	Emley (8)	402
5	West Didsbury & Chorlton (9)	4–2	Silsden (9)	958
6	Warrington Rylands 1906 (7)	4–0	Thackley (9)	171
8	Bamber Bridge (7)	1–1	Newton Aycliffe (8)	296
9	Lancaster City (7)	0–0	Barnoldswick Town (9)	343
10	Tadcaster Albion (9)	0–3	Macclesfield (7)	490
11	1874 Northwich (9)	3–2	Stocksbridge Park Steels (8)	300
12	Workington (7)	0–1	Hebburn Town (7)	598
13	FC United of Manchester (7)	3–3	Hyde United (7)	1,229
14	Mossley (8)	2–2	Whitby Town (7)	396
15	Witton Albion (8)	3–2	City of Liverpool (8)	501
16	Newcastle Benfield (9)	2–1	Prescot Cables (7)	172
17	Newcastle Blue Star (9)	2–3	Hallam (9)	601
18	Whitchurch Alport (9)	1–1	Wythenshawe Town (8)	150
19	Birtley Town (9)	1–5	Dunston (8)	612
20	Stockton Town (7)	1–0	Widnes (8)	432
21	Sheffield (8)	5–0	Pontefract Collieries (8)	364
22	Newcastle Town (8)	2–1	Long Eaton United (8)	126
23	Belper Town (8)	2–2	Bromsgrove Sporting (7)	485
24	Spalding United (7)	0–0	Matlock Town (7)	344
25	Gainsborough Trinity (7)	2–1	AFC Telford United (7)	375
26	Basford United (7)	6–1	Sporting Khalsa (8)	143
27	Barton Town (9)	0–1	Rugby Town (8)	307
28	Anstey Nomads (8)	3–1	Alvechurch (7)	216
29	Melton Town (9)	1–6	Hednesford Town (8)	460
30	Heanor Town (9)	0–1	Ilkeston Town (7)	611
31	Barwell (7)	3–0	Kidsgrove Athletic (8)	162
32	Dudley Town (9)	0–5	Stourbridge (7)	701
33	Bottesford Town (9)	1–0	Loughborough Students (8)	180
34	Harborough Town (7)	0–0	Darlaston Town (1874) (8)	241
35	Carlton Town (8)	1–0	Stamford (7)	190
36	Mickleover (7)	5–0	Coleshill Town (8)	206
37	Stratford Town (7)	2–3	Worksop Town (7)	374
38	Leek Town (7)	2–0	Ashby Ivanhoe (9)	384
39	Malvern Town (8)	0–1	Cleethorpes Town (8)	391
40	Wellingborough Town (8)	0–2	Shifnal Town (9)	198
41	Grantham Town (8)	1–0	Newark and Sherwood United (9)	381
42	Kettering Town (7)	2–1	Stafford Rangers (8)	844
43	Redditch United (7)	3–1	Halesowen Town (7)	688
44	Gorleston (8)	1–0	Walthamstow (8)	129
45	Tilbury (8)	2–2	Brantham Athletic (9)	189
46	Lowestoft Town (7)	6–2	Potters Bar Town (7)	418
47	Leiston (7)	4–1	Waltham Abbey (8)	103
48	Basildon United (8)	0–1	Biggleswade (8)	96
49	Hitchin Town (7)	0–2	Berkhamsted (8)	427
50	AFC Dunstable (8)	1–0	AFC Sudbury (7)	153
51	Bishop's Stortford (7)	5–0	Cornard United (9)	309
52	Hashtag United (7)	2–0	Stotfold (8)	149
53	Harleston Town (9)	1–1	Biggleswade Town (7)	182
54	St Neots Town (9)	2–2	Barking (9)	338
55	Billericay Town (7)	1–2	Bowers & Pitsea (7)	557
56	Royston Town (7)	1–1	Bedford Town (7)	551
57	Harpenden Town (9)	0–0	St Ives Town (7)	431
58	Enfield (8)	0–5	Brentwood Town (8)	116
60	Felixstowe & Walton United (8)	5–1	Leverstock Green (8)	218
61	Brightlingsea Regent (8)	1–1	Haringey Borough (8)	180
62	Newmarket Town (8)	1–1	Ipswich Wanderers (8)	212
63	Canvey Island (7)	2–1	Milton Keynes Irish (9)	277
64	Witham Town (8)	1–0	Sheringham (9)	181
65	Burgess Hill Town (8)	2–1	AFC Croydon Athletic (8)	415
66	Harefield United (9)	1–1	Lewes (7)	185
67	Kingstonian (8)	1–4	Chichester City (7)	216
68	Dulwich Hamlet (7)	2–2	Leatherhead (8)	1,270
69	Thame United (8)	0–4	Wingate & Finchley (7)	126
70	Ashford United (8)	6–1	Three Bridges (8)	386
71	Ashford Town (Middlesex) (8)	0–2	Herne Bay (8)	97
72	Horsham (7)	4–0	Virginia Water (9)	599
73	Bracknell Town (7)	0–1	South Park (8)	183
74	Athletic Newham (9)	3–3	Amersham Town (9)	48

Tie	Home team (Tier)	Score	Away team (Tier)	Att.
75	Aylesbury Vale Dynamos (9)	0–3	Bognor Regis Town (7)	348
77	Sheppey United (8)	1–1	Hanwell Town (7)	342
78	Hendon (7)	3–0	Whitehawk (7)	221
79	Dartford (7)	6–2	Marlow (7)	610
80	Larkfield & New Hythe Wanderers (9)	1–1	Cray Wanderers (7)	301
81	Steyning Town (8)	1–2	Merstham (8)	138
82	Margate (8)	0–0	Hayes & Yeading United (8)	402
83	Lordswood (9)	3–1	Binfield (8)	130
84	Badshot Lea (8)	1–3	Cray Valley Paper Mills (7)	79
85	Hastings United (7)	3–1	Redhill (9)	625
86	Sittingbourne (8)	2–2	Dover Athletic (7)	523
87	Ramsgate (8)	3–1	Folkestone Invicta (7)	1,016
88	Carshalton Athletic (7)	3–1	Haywards Heath Town (9)	355
89	Punjab United (9)	0–1	Corinthian (9)	104
90	Broadbridge Heath (8)	0–0	Faversham Town (9)	145
91	Westfield (8)	0–2	Chatham Town (7)	181
92	Chertsey Town (7)	3–2	Raynes Park Vale (8)	453
93	Willand Rovers (8)	1–0	Brixham (9)	170
94	Hartpury University (9)	0–2	Nailsea & Tickenham (9)	74
95	Havant & Waterlooville (7)	3–0	Wallingford & Crowmarsh (9)	324
96	Easington Sports (9)	1–1	Frome Town (7)	229
97	Plymouth Parkway (7)	4–1	Baffins Milton Rovers (9)	234
98	Gloucester City (7)	2–0	Paulton Rovers (9)	587
99	Tiverton Town (7)	0–3	Wimborne Town (7)	254
100	Basingstoke Town (7)	1–3	Sholing (7)	713
101	Fleet Town (9)	2–4	AFC Stoneham (9)	241
102	Gosport Borough (7)	4–0	Andover New Street (9)	503
103	Barnstaple Town (9)	1–2	Larkhall Athletic (8)	288
104	Hungerford Town (7)	1–0	Yate Town (8)	275
105	Bideford (8)	0–1	Melksham Town (8)	210
106	Banbury United (7)	2–0	Dorchester Town (7)	458
107	Taunton Town (7)	3–0	Didcot Town (8)	588
108	Westbury United (8)	3–1	AFC Totton (7)	428
109	Tavistock (8)	0–1	Winchester City (7)	209
110	Merthyr Town (7)	3–2	Cribbs (8)	523
111	Bishop's Cleeve (8)	1–1	Laverstock & Ford (9)	202
112	Swindon Supermarine (7)	1–1	Poole Town (7)	218
Sunday 1 September 2024
59	Great Yarmouth Town (9)	1–2	Cheshunt (7)	434
Replays
Monday 2 September 2024
56R	Bedford Town (7)	0–3	Royston Town (7)	319
57R	St Ives Town (7)	5–2	Harpenden Town (9)	224
Tuesday 3 September 2024
74R	Amersham Town (9)	1–0	Athletic Newham (9)	181
8R	Newton Aycliffe (8)	1–1 (5–3 p)	Bamber Bridge (7)	310
9R	Barnoldswick Town (9)	1–0 (a.e.t.)	Lancaster City (7)	251
13R	Hyde United (7)	1–0	FC United of Manchester (7)	893
14R	Whitby Town (7)	3–3 (3–4 p)	Mossley (8)	348
18R	Wythenshawe Town (8)	2–1	Whitchurch Alport (9)	270
23R	Bromsgrove Sporting (7)	2–1 (a.e.t.)	Belper Town (8)	517
24R	Matlock Town (7)	0–1 (a.e.t.)	Spalding United (7)	423
45R	Brantham Athletic (9)	1–2	Tilbury (8)	145
53R	Biggleswade Town (7)	3–1	Harleston Town (9)	128
54R	Barking (9)	3–2 (a.e.t.)	St Neots Town (9)	93
61R	Haringey Borough (8)	2–1	Brightlingsea Regent (8)	183
62R	Ipswich Wanderers (8)	0–1	Newmarket Town (8)	125
66R	Lewes (7)	0–0 (2–4 p)	Harefield United (9)	528
68R	Leatherhead (8)	1–0	Dulwich Hamlet (7)	236
76R	Walton & Hersham (7)	4–2 (a.e.t.)	Hanworth Villa (8)	728
77R	Hanwell Town (7)	6–0	Sheppey United (8)	265
80R	Cray Wanderers (7)	8–0	Larkfield & New Hythe Wanderers (9)	304
82R	Hayes & Yeading United (8)	1–3	Margate (8)	326
86R	Dover Athletic (7)	0–1	Sittingbourne (8)	734
90R	Faversham Town (9)	1–3	Broadbridge Heath (8)	313
96R	Frome Town (7)	2–1	Easington Sports (9)	314
111R	Laverstock & Ford (9)	1–2	Bishop's Cleeve (8)	214
112R	Poole Town (7)	2–0	Swindon Supermarine (7)	421
Wednesday 4 September 2024
7R	Blyth Spartans (7)	3–1 (a.e.t.)	Campion (9)	729
34R	Darlaston Town (1874) (8)	2–3	Harborough Town (7)	288

=== Upsets ===
Giantkiller (tier)	Opponent (tier)
Upset of two leagues above
Barnoldswick Town (level 9)	1–0 at home vs Lancaster City (level 7)
Newcastle Benfield (level 9)	2–1 at home vs Prescot Cables (level 7)
Harefield United (level 9)	0–0 (4–2 p) away vs Lewes (level 7)

== Second qualifying round ==
The draw for the second qualifying round was made on 2 September 2024. This round saw all teams from Tier 6 enter the competition. Sixteen teams from Tier 9 (1874 Northwich, AFC Stoneham, Amersham Town, Barking, Barnoldswick Town, Bottesford Town, Bury, Corinthian, Crook Town, Hallam, Harefield United, Lordswood, Nailsea & Tickenham, Newcastle Benfield, Shifnal Town, and West Didsbury & Chorlton) entered this round as the lowest ranked teams remaining in the competition.

Number of non-league teams per tier still in qualifying
National League (Note: National League teams joined in the fourth round of qualifying)	North/South	Premier Division	Division One	Regional	Total
24 / 24	48 / 48	54 / 88	35 / 80	23 / 56	184 / 296

Tie	Home team (Tier) (Note: (9) represents teams allocated to divisions at the 9th tier of English football (otherwise known as Step 5 of the National League System). (8) represents the 8th tier (Step 4 NLS). (7) represents the 7th tier (Step 3 NLS). (6) represents the 6th tier (Step 2 NLS).)	Score	Away team (Tier)	Att.
Saturday 14 September 2024
55	Lordswood (9)	0–1	Sittingbourne (8)	745
62	Bognor Regis Town (7)	0–4	Margate (8)	479
65	Cray Wanderers (7)	1–1	Wingate & Finchley (7)	249
1	Dunston (8)	1–1	Scarborough Athletic (6)	524
2	Crook Town (9)	1–2	Witton Albion (8)	571
3	Southport (6)	2–1	Hyde United (7)	1,062
4	Mossley (8)	0–3	Chorley (6)	700
5	Stockton Town (7)	3–2	Marine (6)	472
6	Newcastle Benfield (9)	0–1	Wythenshawe Town (8)	285
7	Guiseley (7)	3–0	1874 Northwich (9)	604
8	Newton Aycliffe (8)	1–1	Warrington Rylands 1906 (7)	349
9	Chester (6)	3–0	Hebburn Town (7)	1,504
11	Curzon Ashton (6)	6–0	Barnoldswick Town (9)	265
12	Warrington Town (6)	1–2	Radcliffe (6)	902
13	Blyth Spartans (7)	0–3	Bury (9)	1,246
14	Spennymoor Town (6)	3–1	Morpeth Town (7)	563
15	Macclesfield (7)	5–0	South Shields (6)	1,601
16	West Didsbury & Chorlton (9)	1–2	Darlington (6)	1,320
17	Newcastle Town (8)	1–1	Scunthorpe United (6)	599
18	Gainsborough Trinity (7)	2–1	Grantham Town (8)	519
19	Hereford (6)	1–1	Ilkeston Town (7)	1,346
20	Kidderminster Harriers (6)	2–1	Leek Town (7)	1,452
21	Kettering Town (7)	1–0	Cleethorpes Town (8)	915
22	Mickleover (7)	0–1	Anstey Nomads (8)	260
23	Harborough Town (7)	4–2	Stourbridge (7)	381
24	Spalding United (7)	0–0	Alfreton Town (6)	370
25	Shifnal Town (9)	1–1	Redditch United (7)	675
26	Bromsgrove Sporting (7)	2–0	Bottesford Town (9)	575
27	Buxton (6)	2–2	Barwell (7)	623
28	Rushall Olympic (6)	5–0	Sheffield (8)	302
29	Leamington (6)	1–0	Carlton Town (8)	434
30	Rugby Town (8)	2–2	Hednesford Town (8)	545
31	Worksop Town (7)	6–3	Basford United (7)	558
32	Needham Market (6)	0–3	St Albans City (6)	388
33	Lowestoft Town (7)	5–2	Newmarket Town (8)	508
34	Hemel Hempstead Town (6)	0–1	Bishop's Stortford (7)	780
35	King's Lynn Town (6)	1–0	Cheshunt (7)	622
36	Canvey Island (7)	2–0	Felixstowe & Walton United (8)	393
37	St Ives Town (7)	5–0	Berkhamsted (8)	228
38	Bowers & Pitsea (7)	1–2	Biggleswade Town (7)	175
39	Tilbury (8)	0–2	Chelmsford City (6)	629
40	Haringey Borough (8)	1–1	Witham Town (8)	348
41	Gorleston (8)	2–2	Barking (9)	148
42	Hornchurch (6)	2–1	Hashtag United (7)	681
43	Enfield Town (6)	0–1	Peterborough Sports (6)	574
44	Aveley (6)	1–2	Royston Town (7)	274
46	Brentwood Town (8)	2–2	Leiston (7)	364
47	Ashford United (8)	3–0	Corinthian (9)	510
48	Ramsgate (8)	1–0	Broadbridge Heath (8)	861
49	Burgess Hill Town (8)	2–3	Amersham Town (9)	338
50	Hanwell Town (7)	0–2	Chertsey Town (7)	370

Tie	Home team (Tier)	Score	Away team (Tier)	Att.
51	Welling United (6)	0–1	Chatham Town (7)	661
52	Eastbourne Borough (6)	0–1	Boreham Wood (6)	773
53	Carshalton Athletic (7)	1–0	South Park (8)	443
54	Hastings United (7)	1–0	Harefield United (9)	751
56	Tonbridge Angels (6)	2–1	Merstham (8)	866
57	Chichester City (7)	2–2	Slough Town (6)	498
58	Maidstone United (6)	2–1	Hampton & Richmond Borough (6)	1,287
59	Dartford (7)	2–0	Leatherhead (8)	675
60	Worthing (6)	3–2	Havant & Waterlooville (7)	1,017
61	Horsham (7)	1–0	Dorking Wanderers (6)	1,918
63	Cray Valley Paper Mills (7)	0–2	Chesham United (6)	272
64	Walton & Hersham (7)	2–1	Farnborough (6)	1,002
66	Herne Bay (8)	3–0	Hendon (7)	437
67	Poole Town (7)	2–3	Taunton Town (7)	533
68	Frome Town (7)	0–1	Larkhall Athletic (8)	315
69	Wimborne Town (7)	0–2	Weston-super-Mare (6)	461
70	AFC Stoneham (9)	1–7	Salisbury (6)	375
71	Nailsea & Tickenham (9)	1–6	Chippenham Town (6)	271
72	Truro City (6)	0–2	Brackley Town (6)	1,016
73	Oxford City (6)	6–0	Willand Rovers (8)	252
74	Bath City (6)	2–1	Merthyr Town (7)	1,230
75	Sholing (7)	1–4	Weymouth (6)	386
76	Bishop's Cleeve (8)	3–0	Torquay United (6)	1,188
77	Winchester City (7)	1–1	Hungerford Town (7)	122
78	Plymouth Parkway (7)	4–3	Westbury United (8)	273
79	Melksham Town (8)	1–1	Banbury United (7)	357
80	Gosport Borough (7)	2–2	Gloucester City (7)	528
Sunday 15 September 2024
10	Farsley Celtic (6)	3–1	Hallam (9)	846
Match played at Hallam
45	Biggleswade (8)	2–1	AFC Dunstable (8)	163
Replays
Monday 16 September 2024
25R	Redditch United (7)	0–1	Shifnal Town (9)	382
27R	Barwell (7)	1–2	Buxton (6)	381
Tuesday 17 September 2024
1R	Scarborough Athletic (6)	5–2	Dunston (8)	770
8R	Warrington Rylands 1906 (7)	3–1	Newton Aycliffe (8)	129
17R	Scunthorpe United (6)	5–0	Newcastle Town (8)	1,388
19R	Ilkeston Town (7)	0–1	Hereford (6)	723
24R	Alfreton Town (6)	1–1 (4–3 p)	Spalding United (7)	275
30R	Hednesford Town (8)	4–1	Rugby Town (8)	831
40R	Witham Town (8)	1–1 (3–4 p)	Haringey Borough (8)	262
41R	Barking (9)	0–1	Gorleston (8)	132
46R	Leiston (7)	3–1	Brentwood Town (8)	199
57R	Slough Town (6)	2–1	Chichester City (7)	519
65R	Wingate & Finchley (7)	0–1	Cray Wanderers (7)	149
77R	Hungerford Town (7)	0–1	Winchester City (7)	293
79R	Banbury United (7)	2–3	Melksham Town (8)	478
80R	Gloucester City (7)	0–2	Gosport Borough (7)	462

=== Upsets ===
Giantkiller (tier)	Opponent (tier)
Upset of two leagues above
Bishop's Cleeve (level 8)	3–0 at home vs Torquay United (level 6)
Bury (level 9)	3–0 away vs Blyth Spartans (level 7)
Shifnal Town (Level 9)	1–0 away vs Redditch United (Level 7)

== Third qualifying round ==
The draw for the third qualifying round was made on 16 September 2024. Three clubs (Amersham Town, Bury, and Shifnal Town) from Tier 9 progressed to this round.

Number of non-league teams per tier still in qualifying
National League (Note: National League teams joined in the fourth round of qualifying)	North/South	Premier Division	Division One	Regional	Total
24 / 24	34 / 48	28 / 88	15 / 84	3 / 52	104 / 296

Teams in bold advanced to the Fourth qualifying round.

Tier 6	Tier 7	Tier 8	Tier 9
National League North: **Alfreton Town**; Buxton; **Brackley Town**; **Chester**; Chorley; **Curzon Ashton**; Darlington; **Farsley Celtic**; Hereford; Radcliffe; **Kidderminster Harriers**; King's Lynn Town; Leamington; **Peterborough Sports**; **Rushall Olympic**; **Scarborough Athletic**; Scunthorpe United; Southport; **Spennymoor Town**; National League South: **Bath City**; **Boreham Wood**; **Chelmsford City**; **Chesham United**; Chippenham Town; **Hornchurch**; **Maidstone United**; Oxford City; Salisbury; **Slough Town**; St Albans City; **Tonbridge Angels**; **Weston-super-Mare**; **Weymouth**; **Worthing**	Isthmian League Premier: Canvey Island; **Carshalton Athletic**; Chatham Town; **Cray Wanderers**; Dartford; Hastings United; **Horsham**; Northern Premier League Premier: **Gainsborough Trinity**; **Guiseley**; **Macclesfield**; Stockton Town; Warrington Rylands 1906; Worksop Town; Southern League Premier Central: Biggleswade Town; **Bishop's Stortford**; Bromsgrove Sporting; **Chertsey Town**; **Harborough Town**; **Kettering Town**; **Leiston**; **Lowestoft Town**; Royston Town; St Ives Town; Southern League Premier South: **Gosport Borough**; **Plymouth Parkway**; **Taunton Town**; Walton & Hersham; Winchester City	Isthmian League North: **Gorleston**; Haringey Borough; Isthmian League South East: Ashford United; Herne Bay; Margate; Ramsgate; Sittingbourne; Northern Premier League Division One North: **Hednesford Town**; Witton Albion; Northern Premier League Division One Midlands: Anstey Nomads; Northern Premier League Division One West: Wythenshawe Town; Southern League Division One Central: **Biggleswade**; Southern League Division One South: Bishop's Cleeve; Larkhall Athletic; Melksham Town	Combined Counties League Premier North: Amersham Town; North West Counties League Premier: **Bury**; Midland League Premier: Shifnal Town

Tie	Home team (Tier) (Note: (9) represents teams allocated to divisions at the 9th tier of English football (otherwise known as Step 5 of the National League System). (8) represents the 8th tier (Step 4 NLS). (7) represents the 7th tier (Step 3 NLS). (6) represents the 6th tier (Step 2 NLS).)	Score	Away team (Tier)	Att.
Saturday 28 September 2024
5	Wythenshawe Town (8)	0–1	**Farsley Celtic** (6)	413
1	**Guiseley** (7)	1–0	Scunthorpe United (6)	1,254
2	Stockton Town (7)	1–1	Chester (6)	804
3	Radcliffe (6)	2–3	**Bury** (9)	2,800
4	Southport (6)	0–1	**Curzon Ashton** (6)	960
6	Darlington (6)	1–2	**Gainsborough Trinity** (7)	1,256
7	Warrington Rylands 1906 (7)	0–2	**Scarborough Athletic** (6)	339
8	**Spennymoor Town** (6)	1–0	Chorley (6)	625
9	**Macclesfield** (7)	6–1	Witton Albion (8)	2,188
10	Buxton (6)	1–1	Kidderminster Harriers (6)	806
11	Leiston (7)	1–1	Hornchurch (6)	312
12	Haringey Borough (8)	3–3	Lowestoft Town (7)	317
13	Shifnal Town (9)	0–0	Hednesford Town (8)	1,106
14	**Harborough Town** (7)	1–0	Leamington (6)	614
16	Royston Town (7)	0–0	Peterborough Sports (6)	621
18	St Ives Town (7)	0–3	**Kettering Town** (7)	681
19	**Rushall Olympic** (6)	2–1	Anstey Nomads (8)	324
20	**Chelmsford City** (6)	2–1	Bromsgrove Sporting (7)	808
21	**Gorleston** (8)	4–2	St Albans City (6)	281
22	**Bishop's Stortford** (7)	3–2	Hereford (6)	674
23	Worksop Town (7)	1–1	King's Lynn Town (6)	759
24	Salisbury (6)	1–2	**Bath City** (6)	1,312
25	**Cray Wanderers** (7)	3–0	Hastings United (7)	408
26	**Chertsey Town** (7)	3–2	Ashford United (8)	641
27	**Worthing** (6)	3–1	Dartford (7)	1,263
28	Winchester City (7)	2–2	Weymouth (6)	640
29	Margate (8)	1–1	Horsham (7)	582
30	**Tonbridge Angels** (6)	2–1	Walton & Hersham (7)	1,068

Tie	Home team (Tier)	Score	Away team (Tier)	Att.
31	**Taunton Town** (7)	2–1	Amersham Town (9)	833
32	Sittingbourne (8)	0–3	**Plymouth Parkway** (7)	506
33	Chatham Town (7)	0–3	**Slough Town** (6)	702
34	Bishop's Cleeve (8)	0–0	Chesham United (6)	726
35	**Brackley Town** (6)	4–1	Ramsgate (8)	513
36	Herne Bay (8)	0–1	**Maidstone United** (6)	1,997
37	Oxford City (6)	2–3	**Gosport Borough** (7)	317
38	**Carshalton Athletic** (7)	3–2	Melksham Town (8)	523
39	**Boreham Wood** (6)	2–1	Larkhall Athletic (8)	504
40	Chippenham Town (6)	1–1	Weston-super-Mare (6)	677
Sunday 29 September 2024
17	**Biggleswade** (8)	1–0	Canvey Island (7)	341
Tuesday 8 October 2024
15	Biggleswade Town (7)	0–6	**Alfreton Town** (6)	300
Match played at Alfreton Town
Replays
Tuesday 1 October 2024
2R	**Chester** (6)	1–0	Stockton Town (7)	1,397
10R	**Kidderminster Harriers** (6)	2–0	Buxton (6)	1,123
11R	Hornchurch (6)	1–3 (a.e.t.)	**Leiston** (7)	274
13R	**Hednesford Town** (8)	1–0	Shifnal Town (9)	1,046
16R	**Peterborough Sports** (6)	1–0	Royston Town (7)	211
23R	**King's Lynn Town** (6)	0–0 (4–3 p)	Worksop Town (7)	466
28R	**Weymouth** (6)	3–0	Winchester City (7)	
29R	**Horsham** (7)	2–0	Margate (8)	752
40R	**Weston-super-Mare** (6)	1–0	Chippenham Town (6)	523
Tuesday 8 October 2024
12R	**Lowestoft Town** (7)	3–1	Haringey Borough (8)	512
34R	**Chesham United** (6)	4–0	Bishop's Cleeve (8)	564

=== Upsets ===
Giantkiller (tier)	Opponent (tier)
Upset of three leagues above
**Bury (level 9)**	3–2 away vs Radcliffe (level 6)
Upset of two leagues above
**Gorleston (level 8)**	4–2 at home vs St Albans City (level 6)

== Fourth qualifying round ==
The draw for the fourth qualifying round was made on 30 September 2024. One club from Tier 9, Bury, progressed to this round.

Number of non-league teams per tier still in qualifying
National League	North/South	Premier Division	Division One	Regional	Total
24 / 24	21 / 48	15 / 88	14 / 84	1 / 52	64 / 296

Teams in bold advanced to the First round proper.

Tier 5	Tier 6	Tier 7	Tier 8	Tier 9
National League: AFC Fylde; **Aldershot Town**; Altrincham; **Barnet**; Boston United; **Braintree Town**; **Dagenham & Redbridge**; Eastleigh; Ebbsfleet United; FC Halifax Town; **Forest Green Rovers**; Gateshead; Hartlepool United; **Maidenhead United**; **Oldham Athletic**; **Rochdale**; **Solihull Moors**; **Southend United**; **Sutton United**; **Tamworth**; **Wealdstone**; **Woking**; Yeovil Town; **York City**	National League North: **Alfreton Town**; **Brackley Town**; Chester; **Curzon Ashton**; Farsley Celtic; Kidderminster Harriers; King's Lynn Town; Peterborough Sports; **Rushall Olympic**; **Scarborough Athletic**; Spennymoor Town; National League South: Bath City; **Boreham Wood**; Chelmsford City; **Chesham United**; **Maidstone United**; Slough Town; **Tonbridge Angels**; **Weston-super-Mare**; Weymouth; **Worthing**	Isthmian League Premier: Carshalton Athletic; Cray Wanderers; **Horsham**; Northern Premier League Premier: **Gainsborough Trinity**; **Guiseley**; Macclesfield; Southern League Premier Central: Bishop's Stortford; Chertsey Town; **Harborough Town**; **Kettering Town**; Leiston; Lowestoft Town; Southern League Premier South: Gosport Borough; Plymouth Parkway; Taunton Town	Isthmian League North: Gorleston; Northern Premier League Division One North: **Hednesford Town**; Southern League Division One Central: Biggleswade	North West Counties League Premier: Bury

Tie	Home team (Tier) (Note: (9) represents teams allocated to divisions at the 9th tier of English football (otherwise known as Step 5 of the National League System). (8) represents the 8th tier (Step 4 NLS). (7) represents the 7th tier (Step 3 NLS). (6) represents the 6th tier (Step 2 NLS). (5) represents the 5th tier (Step 1 NLS).)	Score	Away team (Tier)	Att.
Saturday 12 October 2024
1	Rushall Olympic (6)	1–1	Peterborough Sports (6)	828
2	**Tamworth** (5)	4–2	Macclesfield (7)	2,168
3	**Oldham Athletic** (5)	4–2	FC Halifax Town (5)	3,246
4	Hartlepool United (5)	1–1	Brackley Town (6)	2,012
5	Farsley Celtic (6)	1–2	**Kettering Town** (7)	631
6	Altrincham (5)	1–1	Solihull Moors (5)	1,611
7	AFC Fylde (5)	1–4	**Rochdale** (5)	1,846
8	**Scarborough Athletic** (6)	3–1	Chester (6)	1,803
9	Biggleswade (8)	1–3	**York City** (5)	1,180
10	**Harborough Town** (7)	1–0	Bury (9)	1,600
11	**Curzon Ashton** (6)	1–0	King's Lynn Town (6)	478
12	Gainsborough Trinity (7)	2–2	Boston United (5)	1,952
14	**Alfreton Town** (6)	1–0	Spennymoor Town (6)	557
15	Kidderminster Harriers (6)	0–1	**Guiseley** (7)	2,299
16	Taunton Town (7)	1–1	Maidenhead United (5)	1,364
17	**Horsham** (7)	1–0	Gorleston (8)	1,328
18	**Aldershot Town** (5)	2–1	Bath City (6)	2,121
19	Eastleigh (5)	0–1	**Southend United** (5)	1,659
20	Chertsey Town (7)	1–3	**Sutton United** (5)	2,134
21	**Boreham Wood** (6)	4–0	Carshalton Athletic (7)	632
22	Lowestoft Town (7)	1–3	**Weston-super-Mare** (6)	1,166

Tie	Home team (Tier)	Score	Away team (Tier)	Att.
23	**Wealdstone** (5)	4–1	Gosport Borough (7)	1,005
24	Leiston (7)	1–5	**Dagenham & Redbridge** (5)	654
25	**Barnet** (5)	4–0	Chelmsford City (6)	1,503
26	**Chesham United** (6)	1–0	Yeovil Town (5)	1,321
27	Cray Wanderers (7)	0–1	**Tonbridge Angels** (6)	1,222
28	**Woking** (5)	2–1	Slough Town (6)	1,769
29	**Forest Green Rovers** (5)	2–0	Weymouth (6)	1,133
30	**Maidstone United** (6)	3–0	Ebbsfleet United (5)	2,910
31	Plymouth Parkway (7)	0–4	**Worthing** (6)	1,203
32	**Braintree Town** (5)	1–0	Bishop's Stortford (7)	1,258
13	Hednesford Town (8)	1–1	Gateshead (5)	2,669
Replays
Tuesday 15 October 2024
1R	Peterborough Sports (6)	0–0 (4–5 p)	**Rushall Olympic** (6)	621
4R	**Brackley Town** (6)	3–1	Hartlepool United (5)	755
6R	**Solihull Moors** (5)	2–2 (3–1 p)	Altrincham (5)	688
12R	Boston United (5)	0–4	**Gainsborough Trinity** (7)	1,521
13R	Gateshead (5)	1–3	**Hednesford Town** (8)	782
16R	**Maidenhead United** (5)	3–0	Taunton Town (7)	596

Number of non-league teams per centethat qualified for the competition
National League	North/South	Premier Division	Division One	Regional	Total
15 / 24	11 / 48	5 / 88	1 / 84	0 / 52	32 / 296

=== Upsets ===
Giantkiller (tier)	Opponent (tier)
Upset of three leagues above
**Hednesford Town (level 8)**	3–1 away vs Gateshead (level 5)
Upset of two leagues above
**Gainsborough Trinity (level 7)**	4–0 away vs Boston United (level 5)

== Broadcasting ==
The qualifying rounds were not covered by the FA Cup's broadcasting contracts held by BBC Sport and ITV, although one game per round was broadcast by the BBC on its media platforms.

Round	Tie	Broadcaster
Preliminary round	Ashington v Bishop Auckland	BBC Sport
First qualifying round	Campion v Blyth Spartans	BBC Sport
Second qualifying round	Lordswood v Sittingbourne	BBC Sport
Third qualifying round	Wythenshawe Town v Farsley Celtic	BBC Sport
Fourth qualifying round	Hednesford Town v Gateshead	BBC Sport
Fourth qualifying round	Gateshead v Hednesford Town	National League TV (247.tv)
