= Gothic F.C. =

Former English football club based in Norwich

Gothic
- Full name: Gothic Football Club
- Founded: 1898
- Ground: Heartsease Lane, Norwich

Gothic F.C. was an English football club based in Norwich. They were members of the Eastern Counties League between 1963 and 1978.

== History ==
The club was established in 1898 as the works team of Laurence, Scott and Electromotors and initially played at Hall Road in Norwich city centre, a site which is now the Hewett Academy. The company's main factory was located next to Norwich City's Carrow Road ground and was known as the Gothic Works, from which the team took its name. Between 1911 and 1913 they played in the Norwich & District League, and the 1938–39 season was spent in the East Anglian League.

In 1946 the club joined the Norfolk & Suffolk League and also started entering the FA Cup, almost reaching the first round in their first season, losing their fourth qualifying round tie to Colchester United. However, they did win the Norfolk Senior Cup, beating King's Lynn 6–2 in the final. They won the Senior Cup again in 1949–50, also winning the Norfolk & Suffolk League. They retained the title the following season, and won it again in 1955–56, 1956–57, 1958–59, 1960–61, 1961–62. In the early 1960s they moved to Heartsease Lane.

After finishing as Norfolk & Suffolk League runners-up in 1962–63, Gothic joined the Eastern Counties League. However, the club remained amateur and frequently lost their better players. After finishing bottom in 1974–75 the club offered its resignation to the league due to financial restrictions, but after Gorleston initiated a "Save Gothic" fund, they were able to continue. However, they withdrew from the league at the end of the 1977–78 season. The club had hoped to continue playing in the Anglian Combination, but after the firm stated that only employees could play for the club, they were forced to drop down to the Norwich Business House League and folded a few seasons later.

Their Heartsease Lane ground was taken over by Norwich United in 1985, who later moved to Plantation Park.

== Honours ==
- Norfolk & Suffolk League
  - Champions 1949–50, 1950–51, 1955–56, 1956–57, 1958–59, 1960–61, 1961–62
- Norfolk Senior Cup
  - Winners 1946–47, 1949–50, 1960–61, 1962–63
