= Norfolk Senior Cup =

- Organiser(s): Norfolk County FA
- Founded: 1881; 145 years ago
- Region: Norfolk
- Teams: 38 (2023–24)
- Current champions: Mulbarton Wanderers (2nd title)
- Most championships: King's Lynn (20 titles)
- Website: Norfolk Senior Cup

The Norfolk Senior Cup (currently known as the Norfolk Hire Senior Cup for sponsorship reasons) is a football cup competition for clubs in the county of Norfolk, England, who compete between steps three and seven of the non-League pyramid. The first competition for this cup was held in the 1881–82 season.

== History ==
First competed in 1881, Norfolk Senior Cup is one the oldest county cup in England. The first ever competition was won by Norwich & Norfolk, who defeated King's Lynn 3–1 in the finals. While most of the winners have played within the National League System, Mattishall became first club outside of National League System to win the cup, when they defeated Norwich United 5–4 on penalties in the 2009–10 finals.

== Finals ==
This section lists every final of the competition played since 1881, the winners, the runners-up, and the result.

=== Key ===
| Match went to a replay |
| Match went to extra time |
| Match decided by a penalty shootout after extra time |
| Shared trophy |

| Season | Winners | Result | Runner-up | Notes |
|---|---|---|---|---|
| 1881–82 | Norwich & Norfolk | 3–1 | Lynn Town | |
| 1882–83 | Lynn Town | 5–1 | Norwich Wanderers | |
| 1883–84 | Cup withdrawn. Lynn Alexandra and Carrow were in the finals. | | | |
| 1884–85 | Lynn Town | 3–2 | Carrow | |
| 1885–86 | Norwich Teachers | 2–0 | Lynn Alexandra | |
| 1886–87 | Lynn Town | 4–2 | Carrow | |
| 1887–88 | Wymondham | 1–0 | Thorpe | |
| 1888–89 | Wymondham | 3–0 | Lynn Town | |
| 1889–90 | Lynn Town | 3–1 | Thorpe | |
| 1890–91 | Yarmouth Association | 5–2 | CEYMS | |
| 1891–92 | CEYMS | 6–0 | Dereham | |
| 1892–93 | Yarmouth Royal Artillery | 2–0 | Lynn Town | |
| 1893–94 | Yarmouth Royal Artillery | 2–1 | CEYMS | |
| 1894–95 | Yarmouth Royal Artillery | 3–0 | CEYMS | |
| 1895–96 | Yarmouth Fearnoughts | 5–0 | Lynn Town | Second replay. First match 2–2. Replay 0–0. |
| 1896–97 | CEYMS | 2–1 | Yarmouth Fearnoughts | |
| 1897–98 | Great Yarmouth Town | 4–2 | Lynn Town | Replay. First match 0–0. |
| 1898–99 | Lynn Town | 2–0 | Great Yarmouth Town | |
| 1899–00 | CEYMS | 2–0 | Lynn Town | |
| 1900–01 | CEYMS | 2–0 | Lynn Town | |
| 1901–02 | CEYMS | 1–0 | Great Yarmouth Town | |
| 1902–03 | Great Yarmouth Town | 1–0 | Lynn Town | |
| 1903–04 | Great Yarmouth Town | 4–0 | Lynn Town | Replay. First match 0–0. |
| 1904–05 | Great Yarmouth Town | 1–0 | Lynn Town | |
| 1905–06 | Great Yarmouth Town | 3–2 | Lynn Town | |
| 1906–07 | Norwich St James' | 2–1 | CEYMS | |
| 1907–08 | Lynn Town | 4–2 | 19th Royal Hussars | Replay. First match 2–2. |
| 1908–09 | 19th Royal Hussars | 3–2 | CEYMS | Replay. First match 2–2. |
| 1909–10 | 16th Lancers | 1–0 | Carrow | Replay. First match 2–2. |
| 1910–11 | CEYMS | 3–0 | Great Yarmouth Town | |
| 1911–12 | CEYMS | 2–1 | Cromer | |
| 1912–13 | Cromer | 1–0 | Lynn Town | |
| 1913–14 | Cromer | 1–0 | Great Yarmouth Town | |
| 1914–19 | No competition due to World War I. | | | |
| 1919–20 | Norwich City | 4–0 | Cromer | |
| 1920–21 | Cromer | 2–1 | Gorleston | |
| 1921–22 | Gorleston | 1–0 | Lynn Town | Replay. First match 0–0. |
| 1922–23 | Gorleston | 4–1 | CEYMS | Replay. First match 1–1. |
| 1923–24 | Lynn Town | 2–1 | Cromer Town | |
| 1924–25 | Lynn Town | 2–0 | 5th Co BBOB | |
| 1925–26 | Gorleston | 1–0 | CEYMS | |
| 1926–27 | CEYMS | 6–3 | Gorleston | |
| 1927–28 | Gorleston | 3–0 | Cromer Town | |
| 1928–29 | Great Yarmouth Town | 2–1 | Holt United | |
| 1929–30 | Great Yarmouth Town | 2–1 | Gorleston | |
| 1930–31 | Gorleston | 2–1 | Lynn Town | |
| 1931–32 | Lynn Town | 4–1 | Great Yarmouth Town | Replay. First match 1–1. |
| 1932–33 | Gorleston | 1–0 | CEYMS | |
| 1933–34 | Lynn Town | 1–0 | Gorleston | |
| 1934–35 | Norwich City 'A' | 5–0 | Sheringham | Replay. First match 1–1. |
| 1935–36 | Gorleston | 2–1 | Lynn Town | |
| 1936–37 | Lynn Town | 2–0 | Gorleston | Replay. First match 0–0. |
| 1937–38 | Gorleston | 3–0 | Great Yarmouth Town | |
| 1938–39 | Lynn Town | 4–1 | Fakenham Town | |
| 1936–46 | No competition due to World War II. | | | |
| 1946–47 | Gothic | 6–2 | Lynn Town | |
| 1947–48 | Thetford Town | 4–0 | North Walsham | Replay. First match 2–2. |
| 1948–49 | Carrow | 3–1 | Lynn Town | |
| 1949–50 | Gothic | 3–0 | CNSOBU | |
| 1950–51 | Gorleston | 7–0 | Cromer Town | |
| 1951–52 | Lynn Town | 2–1 | Gorleston | |
| 1952–53 | Gorleston | 3–0 | Lynn Town | |
| 1953–54 | King's Lynn | 2–1 | Great Yarmouth Town | Replay. First match 0–0. |
| 1954–55 | King's Lynn | 2–0 | Gorleston | |
| 1955–56 | King's Lynn | 3–0 | Gothic | |
| 1956–57 | King's Lynn | 2–1 | Great Yarmouth Town | |
| 1957–58 | King's Lynn | 3–1 | Norwich City | |
| 1958–59 | Norwich City | 7–2 | Gorleston | |
| 1959–60 | Norwich City | 3–0 | King's Lynn | |
| 1960–61 | Gothic | 5–0 | Fakenham Town | |
| 1961–62 | Great Yarmouth Town | 2–1 | Fakenham Town | Replay. First match 3–3. |
| 1962–63 | Gothic | 3–0 | Gorleston | |
| 1963–64 | Downham Town | 3–2 | Norwich Electricity | |
| 1964–65 | Great Yarmouth Town | 2–1 | Thetford Town | Replay. First match 1–1. |
| 1965–66 | Downham Town | 1–0 | Norwich Electricity | |
| 1966–67 | CNSOBU | 2–1 | Downham Market | |
| 1967–68 | Horsford United | 2–1 | Downham Town | |
| 1968–69 | Gorleston | 2–1 | Downham Town | |
| 1969–70 | CNSOBU | 4–0 | St Andrew's | |
| 1970–71 | Fakenham Town | 2–0 | Watton United | |
| 1971–72 | St Andrew's | 2–1 | Sheringham | |
| 1972–73 | Fakenham Town | 5–4 | Hoveton Wherryman | |
| 1973–74 | St Andrew's | 2–0 | Sheringham | |
| 1974–75 | Diss Town | 3–2 | St Andrew's | |
| 1975–76 | St Andrew's | 2–0 | Norman OB | |
| 1976–77 | St Andrew's | 4–1 | Thetford Rovers | |
| 1977–78 | Gorleston | 1–0 | Hellesdon | |
| 1978–79 | Great Yarmouth Town | 5–0 | Hoveton Wherryman | |
| 1979–80 | Great Yarmouth Town | 2–0 | Gorleston | |
| 1980–81 | Newton Flotman | 2–0 | Gorleston | |
| 1981–82 | St Andrew's | 4–2 | Thetford Town | |
| 1982–83 | King's Lynn reserves | 1–0 | Great Yarmouth Town | |
| 1983–84 | Gorleston | 2–0 | Great Yarmouth Town | |
| 1984–85 | Great Yarmouth Town | 1–0 | Gorleston | |
| 1985–86 | Norwich City reserves | 4–1 | Poringland United | |
| 1986–87 | Watton United | 3–1 | Poringland United | |
| 1987–88 | Norwich City reserves | 1–0 | Great Yarmouth Town | |
| 1988–89 | Norwich City reserves | 1–0 | Great Yarmouth Town | |
| 1989–90 | Great Yarmouth Town | 2–1 | Norwich United | |
| 1990–91 | Thetford Town | 4–3 | St Andrew's | |
| 1991–92 | Fakenham Town | 2–1 | Diss Town | Replay. First match 2–2 after extra-time. |
| 1992–93 | Wroxham | 3–0 | Watton United | |
| 1993–94 | Fakenham Town | 4–0 | King's Lynn | |
| 1994–95 | Fakenham Town | 2–1 | Gorleston | |
| 1995–96 | Diss Town | 4–0 | Wroxham | |
| 1996–97 | Wroxham | 4–1 | Diss Town | |
| 1997–98 | Wroxham | 3–1 | Swaffham Town | |
| 1998–99 | Fakenham Town | 4–2 | Swaffham Town | |
| 1999–00 | Wroxham | 4–0 | Gorleston | |
| 2000–01 | Gorleston | 4–0 | Great Yarmouth Town | |
| 2001–02 | Wroxham | 2–1 | Great Yarmouth Town | |
| 2002–03 | Diss Town | 4–1 | Great Yarmouth Town | |
| 2003–04 | Wroxham | 3–3 | Diss Town | Wroxham won 6–5 on penalties. After extra-time. |
| 2004–05 | Diss Town | 3–0 | Wroxham | |
| 2005–06 | Dereham Town | 1–0 | Norwich United | |
| 2006–07 | Dereham Town | 1–0 | Wroxham | |
| 2007–08 | Wroxham | 3–1 | Sheringham | |
| 2008–09 | King's Lynn reserves | 3–1 | Wroxham | |
| 2009–10 | Mattishall | 1–1 | Norwich United | Mattishall won 5–4 on penalties. After extra-time. |
| 2010–11 | Dereham Town | 4–1 | King's Lynn Town | |
| 2011–12 | Gorleston | 2–0 | Thetford Town | |
| 2012–13 | Norwich City U21 | 2–0 | Wroxham | |
| 2013–14 | Gorleston | 1–0 | Wroxham | |
| 2014–15 | Wroxham | 3–2 | Dereham Town | After extra-time. |
| 2015–16 | Dereham Town | 2–0 | Norwich United | |
| 2016–17 | King's Lynn Town | 2–0 | Fakenham Town | |
| 2017–18 | Norwich United | 4–2 | Downham Town | After extra-time. |
| 2018–19 | Dereham Town | 2–1 | Thetford Town | After extra-time. |
| 2019–20 | Competition abandoned due to COVID-19 pandemic. Dereham Town and University of East Anglia were in the finals. | | | |
| 2020–21 | Gorleston | 3–2 | Mulbarton Wanderers | |
| 2021–22 | Mulbarton Wanderers | 2–1 | Dereham Town | |
| 2022–23 | Gorleston | 3–0 | Dereham Town | |
| 2023–24 | Downham Town | 4–2 | Gorleston | |
| 2024–25 | Norwich City U21s | 4–1 | Wroxham | |
| 2025–26 | Mulbarton Wanderers | 2–1 | Dereham Town | |

=== Wins by teams ===
| Club | Wins | First final won | Last final won | Runner-up | Last final lost | Total final apps. | Notes |
|---|---|---|---|---|---|---|---|
| King's Lynn † | 20 | 1882–83 | 2008–09 | 20 | 1993–94 | 40 | (Note: Dissolved in 2009. Won 13 titles as Lynn Town and 1 title as King's Lynn reserves.) |
| Gorleston | 18 | 1921–22 | 2022–23 | 15 | 2023–24 | 33 | |
| Great Yarmouth Town | 13 | 1897–98 | 1989–90 | 15 | 2002–03 | 28 | |
| Norwich City | 9 | 1919–20 | 2024–25 | 0 | – | 9 | (Note: Won 3 titles as Norwich City reserves, 1 title as Norwich City 'A' and 2 titles as Norwich City U21.) |
| CEYMS | 8 | 1891–92 | 1926–27 | 8 | 1932–33 | 16 | |
| Wroxham | 8 | 1992–93 | 2014–15 | 6 | 2013–14 | 14 | |
| Fakenham Town | 6 | 1970–71 | 1998–99 | 4 | 2016–17 | 10 | |
| Dereham Town | 5 | 2005–06 | 2018–19 | 5 | 2025–26 | 10 | |
| St Andrew's | 5 | 1971–72 | 1981–82 | 3 | 1990–91 | 8 | |
| Diss Town | 4 | 1974–75 | 2004–05 | 3 | 2003–04 | 7 | |
| Gothic † | 4 | 1946–47 | 1962–63 | 1 | 1955–56 | 5 | (Note: Dissolved in 1980s.) |
| Cromer Town | 3 | 1912–13 | 1920–21 | 5 | 1950–51 | 8 | (Note: Won 3 titles as Cromer.) |
| Downham Town | 3 | 1963–64 | 2023–24 | 3 | 2017–18 | 6 | |
| Yarmouth Royal Artillery | 3 | 1892–93 | 1894–95 | 0 | – | 2 | |
| Thetford Town | 2 | 1947–48 | 1990–91 | 4 | 2018–19 | 6 | |
| Mulbarton Wanderers | 2 | 2025–26 | 2021–22 | 1 | 2020–21 | 3 | |
| CNSOBU † | 2 | 1966–67 | 1969–70 | 1 | 1949–50 | 3 | (Note: Dissolved in 1988.) |
| Wymondham Town | 2 | 1887–88 | 1888–89 | 0 | – | 2 | (Note: Won 2 titles as Wymondham.) |
| Norwich United | 1 | 2017–18 | 2017–18 | 4 | 2015–16 | 5 | |
| Carrow † | 1 | 1948–49 | 1948–49 | 3 | 1909–10 | 4 | (Note: Dissolved in 1968.) |
| 19th Royal Hussars † | 1 | 1908–09 | 1908–09 | 1 | 1907–08 | 2 | (Note: Military team. Dissolved in 1992 after regiment was merged.) |
| King's Lynn Town | 1 | 2016–17 | 2016–17 | 1 | 2010–11 | 2 | |
| 16th Lancers † | 1 | 1909–10 | 1909–10 | 0 | – | 1 | (Note: Military team. Dissolved in 1922 after regiment was amalgamated.) |
| Horsford United † | 1 | 1967–68 | 1967–68 | 0 | – | 1 | (Note: Dissolved in 2009.) |
| Mattishall | 1 | 2009–10 | 2009–10 | 0 | – | 1 | |
| Newton Flotman † | 1 | 1980–81 | 1980–81 | 0 | – | 1 | (Note: Dissolved in 2004.) |
| Norwich & Norfolk † | 1 | 1881–82 | 1881–82 | 0 | – | 1 | (Note: Dissolved.) |
| Norwich St James' † | 1 | 1906–07 | 1906–07 | 0 | – | 1 | (Note: Dissolved in 1965.) |
| Norwich Teachers † | 1 | 1885–86 | 1885–86 | 0 | – | 1 | (Note: Dissolved in 1991.) |
| Watton United | 1 | 1986–87 | 1986–87 | 0 | – | 1 | |
| Yarmouth Association † | 1 | 1890–91 | 1890–91 | 0 | – | 1 | (Note: Dissolved.) |
| Yarmouth Fearnoughts † | 1 | 1895–96 | 1895–96 | 0 | – | 1 | (Note: Dissolved in 1955.) |

=== Wins by cities/towns ===
| City/Town | County | Wins | Team(s) |
|---|---|---|---|
| Norwich | Norfolk | 33 | Norwich City (9), CEYMS (8), St Andrew's (4), CNSOBU (2), Norwich United (1), Carrow (1), Norwich & Norfolk (1), Norwich St James' (1), Norwich Teachers (1) |
| King's Lynn | Norfolk | 21 | King's Lynn (20), King's Lynn Town (1) |
| Gorleston-on-Sea | Norfolk | 18 | Gorleston (18) |
| Great Yarmouth | Norfolk | 18 | Great Yarmouth Town (13), Yarmouth Royal Artillery (3), Yarmouth Association (1), Yarmouth Fearnoughts (1) |
| Wroxham | Norfolk | 8 | Wroxham (8) |
| Fakenham | Norfolk | 6 | Fakenham Town (6) |
| Dereham | Norfolk | 5 | Dereham Town (5) |
| Diss | Norfolk | 4 | Diss Town (4) |
| Cromer | Norfolk | 3 | Cromer Town (3) |
| Downham Market | Norfolk | 3 | Downham Town (3) |
| Thetford | Norfolk | 2 | Thetford Town (2) |
| Wymondham | Norfolk | 2 | Wymondham Town (2) |
| Mulbarton | Norfolk | 2 | Mulbarton Wanderers (2) |
| London | Greater London | 1 | 19th Royal Hussars (1) |
| Aldershot | Hampshire | 1 | 16th Lancers (1) |
| Horsford | Norfolk | 1 | Horsford United (1) |
| Mattishall | Norfolk | 1 | Mattishall (1) |
| Newton Flotman | Norfolk | 1 | Newton Flotman (1) |
| Watton | Norfolk | 1 | Watton United (1) |
