= Wymondham (disambiguation) =

Wymondham is a town in Norfolk, England.

Wymondham may also refer to:

- Wymondham, Leicestershire, England
- Wymondham College, Norfolk, England
- Wymondham railway station, Norfolk, England
- Wymondham Town F.C., Norfolk, England
