= Swardeston =

Village in Norfolk, England

Coordinates: 52.57879°N 1.24985°E

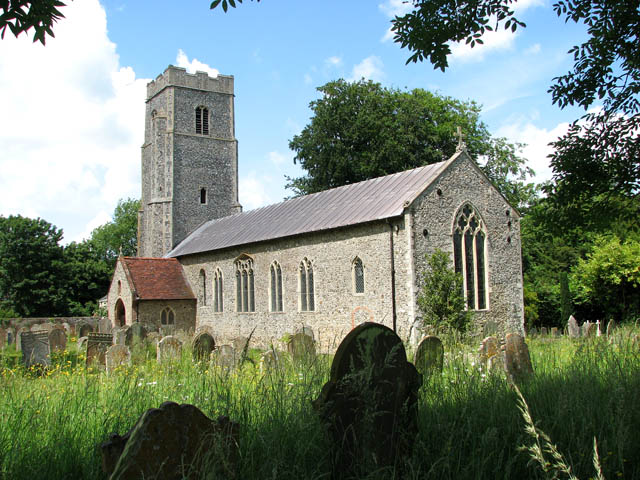
- St Mary's church, Swardeston

- Location within Norfolk
- Area: 3.95 km^{2} (1.53 sq mi)
- Population: 619
  - Density: 157/km^{2} (410/sq mi)
- OS grid reference: TG202028
- Civil parish: Swardeston
- District: South Norfolk
- Shire county: Norfolk
- Region: East
- Country: England
- Sovereign state: United Kingdom
- Post town: NORWICH
- Postcode district: NR14
- Dialling code: 01508
- Police: Norfolk
- Fire: Norfolk
- Ambulance: East of England

Swardeston is a village four miles (6 km) south of Norwich in Norfolk, England, on high ground above the Tas valley. It covers an area of 3.95 km^{2} (1.53 sq mi) and had a population of 619 at the 2011 census.

== Correct pronunciation ==
"Swardston"; "Swordstun"

== History ==
One of the earliest mentions of this place is in the Domesday Book of 1086, where it is mentioned amongst the lands given to Roger Bigod by King William I. The manor given to Roger included 45 acres (180,000 m^{2}) of land and 2 acres (8,100 m^{2}) of meadow.

Its church, dedicated to St Mary the Virgin, has a 15th-century tower, but two arched windows indicate that its origins are Saxon and Norman.

Edith Cavell, the English nurse shot dead by a German firing squad during the First World War, was born in Swardeston in 1865.

== Sport ==
=== Swardeston Cricket Club ===
Swardeston hosts a successful cricket team, who have won ECB National Club Twenty20 three times (in 2010, 2016 and 2019) and the ECB National Club Cricket Championship in 2019, when they defeated Nantwich at Lord's by 53 runs. They have also won the East Anglian Premier League eight times, including five consecutive tiles from 2012 to 2016.

=== Football ===
In football, Norwich CEYMS of the Anglian Combination also play in the village.
