= Anglian Combination =

Eleventh tier in English league football

- Founded: 1964
- Country: England
- Confederation: Norfolk County Football Association
- Divisions: 7
- Number of clubs: 85: Premier Division: 15; Division One: 16; Division Two: 15; Division Three North: 14; Division Three South: 15; Division Four North: 13; Division Four South: 12
- Level on pyramid: Level 11 (Premier Division)
- Feeder to: Eastern Counties League (Division One)
- Relegation to: Central and South Norfolk League; Lowestoft & District League; North East Norfolk League; North West Norfolk League
- Domestic cups: Don Frost Memorial Cup; Senior League Cup; Junior League Cup; Reserve League Cup
- Current champions: Gorleston Reserves
- Most championships: Blofield United (6)
- Website: Official website

The Anglian Combination (currently known as the Fosters Solicitors Anglian Combination for sponsorship reasons) is an English football league that operates in East Anglia. The league specifically covers Norfolk and northern Suffolk, with rules stating that clubs should be within a 50-mile radius from the centre of Norwich.

It consists of 85 teams and has seven divisions – the Premier Division, Division One, Division Two, plus the regionalised Division Three North, Division Three South, Division Four North, and Division Four South.

CNSOBU (City of Norwich School Old Boys Union) were the first champions of the Anglian Combination in 1965, winning the Senior A Division in the league's transitional season. Blofield United is the most successful club in the Anglian Combination's history, with six top division league titles, while Acle United and Wroxham have won the most consecutive titles, with both clubs winning the Anglian Combination four times in succession.

== History ==
The league was formed in 1964, as a merger of the East Anglian League and the Norfolk & Suffolk League (established 1897) and had a transitional season in 1964–65 before settling down to a regular format for the 1965–66 season of four divisions for first teams and three for reserves. A further division for first teams was added for 1966–67, and that format remained unchanged until the previously separate reserve divisions incorporated into the main structure for the 2003–04 season. The winners of the Premier Division are also known as the Sterry Cup winners and are eligible for promotion to the Eastern Counties League.

After a league meeting of the Anglian Combination clubs on 9 February 2011, it was decided the Anglian Combination would adopt the FA's Respect programme. This included the practice of all players on the two teams and match officials shaking hands before the game.

== Sponsorship ==
From 1992 to 2006, the chartered accountants Lovewell Blake sponsored the league. Dolphin Autos took over sponsorship of the league from 2006 to 2010. Gleave & Associates sponsored the league for one year during 2010–11 season. This was followed by three seasons without sponsorship before the independent financial advisors, Almary Green, agreed to sponsor the league for three years from the 2014–15 to 2016–17 seasons. Hadley and Ottaway were the sponsors from the 2017–18 to the 2020–21 season. Fosters Solicitors announced a new sponsorship partnership in April 2021 and continue to support the league.

Period	Sponsor
1992–2006	Lovewell Blake
2006–2010	Dolphin Autos
2010–2011	Gleave & Associates
2011–2014	No sponsor
2014–2017	Almary Green
2017–2021	Hadley and Ottaway
2021–present	Fosters Solicitors

== Format and regulations ==
No more than 80 clubs and 132 teams (first and reserve teams) are to be permitted to the league system. In theory this means that no more than 52 clubs can have both a first and reserve team competing in the league. No more than one team from a club can play in the same division. The Premier Division and Division One are "senior" divisions, while the rest of the divisions are "junior" divisions. There is a limit of sixteen teams for each division. Some divisions are reduced in size either at the start of the season or during the season because of teams withdrawing either for financial reasons or a lack of players. Their places for the next season are taken by teams elected from the feeder leagues. Teams play each other twice, home and away, in a double round-robin format.

In Division One to Division Three, the top two clubs are promoted while the bottom two are relegated. In Division Four, the top two are promoted and the bottom four are relegated. In Division Five, the top two are promoted from each regional division. In the Premier Division, there is no automatic promotion as clubs need to meet the FA's ground grading guide for admission to the Eastern Senior League in order to do so. Only teams finishing in the top two of the Premier Division are eligible for promotion (the runners-up are eligible if the champions decide not to apply for promotion). The bottom two clubs are relegated to Division One. Clubs need to be elected from the feeder leagues below, in order for relegation to occur from the regional Division Fives, providing that there are no places in other divisions in the league to fill due to withdrawals.

There are some interesting rules in the Anglian Combination. Unlike professional leagues, no team or goalkeeper is allowed to wear black or very dark shirts. This is because referees' kits in this division are all black, compared to professional leagues in which referees wear different coloured kits where appropriate. Another rule of interest is that matches can be less than 90 minutes (but no less than 70 minutes), although this rule only comes into play if the two team captains and referee agree prior to kick-off and it is deemed appropriate for the match to be shorter than 90 minutes. A typical reason that this rule comes into play is for evening kick-offs due to a lack of natural light if the home team's ground does not have floodlights. Similarly, half-time intervals can be less than 10–15 minutes with the consent of the referee.

FA Charter Standard

The Anglian Combination is looking to become a designated FA Charter Standard League. Member clubs had until the end of the 2014–15 season to become an FA Charter Standard club or they face expulsion from the league. New member clubs have one season to achieve Charter Standard status.

Players

- Any team shall not have more than three players who have played in a more senior cup competition in two of the three consecutive games immediately prior to a league game.
- Players must be at least 16 years old to play an Anglian Combination game.

Premier Division ground grading

Clubs in the Premier Division are subject to the FA's Ground Grading regulations where they are subject to the regulations of Grade H. Clubs that fail to comply with the regulations by a certain deadline could face expulsion to Division 1 at the end of the season. Every Premier Division club in the 2011–12 competition met the deadline of 31 March 2012 except North Walsham Town. They were given a deadline of 25 June 2012 to raise the funds and complete the work needed to meet regulations. Otherwise, North Walsham Town would have been demoted to Division 1. However, after finding the funds and getting the necessary upgrades done in time, they stayed in the Premier Division for the 2012–13 season, but were relegated at the end of the season.

== Current members ==
=== Premier Division (Sterry Cup) ===
Club	Home ground	2025–26 position
Acle United	War Memorial Recreation Centre, Acle	11th
Aylsham	Youngs Park, Aylsham	5th
Beccles Town	College Meadow, Beccles	6th
Blofield United	Old Yarmouth Road. Blofield	Division One, 4th
Bungay Town	Maltings Meadow Sports Ground, Ditchingham	12th
Castle Acre Swifts	Massingham Road, Castle Acre	7th
Easton	South Green, Mattishall	14th
Holt United	Woodfield Road, Holt	Division One, 1st
Long Stratton	Manor Road, Long Stratton	2nd
Norton Athletic	Loddon Road, Norton Subcourse	Division One, 3rd
Norwich CEYMS	Hilltops Sports Ground, Swardeston	8th
Scole United	Ransome Avenue, Scole	9th
Sprowston	Blue Boar Lane, Norwich	4th
Thetford Rovers	Euston Park, Thetford	Division One, 2nd
UEA	Bowthorpe Park, Norwich	13th
Watton United	Dereham Road, Watton	10th

=== Division One (East Anglian Division One Cup) ===
Club	Home ground	2025–26 position
Attleborough Town	Station Road, Attleborough	Division Two, 1st
Beccles Caxton	Caxton Meadow, Beccles	Division Two, 4th
Brandon Town	Church Road, Brandon	15th
Caister	Allendale Road, Caister-on-Sea	7th
Costessey Sports	Bowthorpe Park, Norwich	Division Two, 2nd
Dersingham Rovers	The Pastures, Dersingham	6th
Fakenham Town Reserves	Clipbush Park, Fakenham	13th
Kirkley & Pakefield Reserves	Walmer Road, Kirkley	5th
Loddon United	George Lane, Loddon	10th
North Walsham Town	Greens Road, North Walsham	8th
Swaffham Town	Shoemakers Lane, Swaffham	Premier Division, 15th
Tacolneston	West Way, Tacolneston	9th
Watlington	The Rabbit Hole, School Road, Runcton Holme	Division Two, 3rd
Waveney	Saturn Close Sports Ground, Lowestoft	12th
Wells Town	Beach Road, Wells-next-the-Sea	14th
Yelverton	Garrick Field, Yelverton	11th

=== Division Two (Allerton Cup) ===
Club	Home ground	2025–26 position
Beccles Town Reserves	College Meadow, Beccles	11th
Dussindale & Hellesdon Rovers Reserves	The Nest, Norwich	13th
East Harling	Church Road, East Harling	8th
Feltwell United	Paynes Lane, Feltwell	Division Three North, 1st
Great Yarmouth Town Reserves	Beaconsfield, Great Yarmouth	Division Three South, 2nd
Hempnall	Bungay Road, Hempnall	Division Three South, 3rd
Horsford	Holt Road, Horsford	10th
Long Stratton Reserves	Manor Road, Long Stratton	12th
Marshland Saints	Smeeth Road, Marshland St James	6th
Martham	5 Star Landscapes Ground, Martham	Division Three South, 1st
Mulbarton Wanderers Reserves	Mulberry Park, Mulbarton	9th
Mundford	The Glebe, Mundford	Division One, 16th
Stalham Town	Rivers Park, Stalham	5th
Swaffham Town Reserves	Shoemakers Lane, Swaffham	Division Three North, 2nd
SWFC Lingwood	Station Road, Lingwood	7th

=== Division Three North ===
Club	Home ground	2025–26 position
AFC Lynn	Leonard Towler Playing Field, Wiggenhall St Germans	11th
Attleborough Town Reserves	Station Road, Attleborough	9th
Bradenham & Mattishall	Hale Road, Bradenham	Division Four North, 4th
Briston	Stone Beck Lane, Briston	4th
Dereham Town Development	Aldiss Park, Dereham	Division Four North, 3rd
Dersingham Rovers Reserves	The Pastures, Dersingham	Division Four North, 2nd
Easton Reserves	South Green, Mattishall	13th
Gayton United	Lime Kiln Road, Gayton	6th
Heacham Reserves	Station Road, Heacham	5th
Holt United Reserves	Woodfield Road, Holt	10th
KLSC	kings Way Playing Field, King's Lynn	3rd
North Walsham Town Reserves	Greens Road, North Walsham	7th
Terrington Tigers	Churchgateway, Terrington St Clement	Division Four North, 1st
UEA Reserves	FDC Open 3G, Norwich	12th

=== Division Three South ===
Club	Home ground	2025–26 position
AC Mill Lane	Mill Lane Playing Fields, Bradwell	Division Four South, 2nd
Blofield United Reserves	Old Yarmouth Road, Blofield	8th
Bohemians	New Road Sports & Leisure Centre, Belton	Division Four South, 3rd
Bungay Town Reserves	Maltings Meadow, Ditchingham	9th
Caister Reserves	Allendale Road, Caister-on-Sea	10th
Corton & Carlton Colville	Mills Drive, Corton	12th
Earsham	The Street, Earsham	5th
FC Steamers	Laundry Lane, Thorpe	11th
Hethersett Athletic	Memorial Playing Field, Hethersett	Division Four South, 1st
Norwich CEYMS Reserves	Hilltops Sports Ground, Swardeston	6th
Shrublands	Southtown Common, Gorleston	7th
Sprowston Reserves	Blue Boar Lane, Norwich	4th
Waveney Reserves	Saturn Close, Lowestoft	Division Two, 15th
Wymondham Town	Kings Head Meadow, Wymondham	Division Two, 14th

=== Division Four North ===
Club	Home ground	2025–26 position
Aylsham Reserves	Youngs Park, Aylsham	Division Three North, 14th
Fakenham Town Development	Clipbush Park, Fakenham	
Gayton United Reserves	Lime Kiln Road, Gayton	12th
Ingoldisthorpe	The Drift, Ingoldisthorpe	7th
KLSC Reserves	Kings Way Playing Field, King's Lynn	13th
Madra	Hall Lane, Knapton	6th
North Elmham	Holt Road, North Elmham	9th
Reffley Youth	River Lane, King's Lynn	NW Norfolk Division One, 3rd
Runton	Cromer Road, East Runton	
Thorpe Village	Laundry Lane, Thorpe	Division Four South, 6th
Watlington Reserves	The Rabbit Hole, School Road, Runcton Holme	NW Norfolk Division One, 2nd
Watton United Reserves	Dereham Road, Watton	10th
Wells Town Reserves	Beach Road, Wells-next-the-Sea	11th
Woottons	Cranmer Avenue, North Wootton	8th
Wroxham Development	Trafford Park, Wroxham	5th

=== Division Four South ===
Club	Home ground	2025–26 position
Beccles Caxton Reserves	Caxton Meadow, Beccles	11th
Belton	New Road Sports & Leisure Centre, Belton	12th
Corton & Carlton Colville Reserves	Mills Drive, Corton	Lowestoft & District Division One, 1st
Filby Wanderers	Flegg High School, Martham	4th
Gorleston Development	Lynn Grove Academy, Gorleston	Lowestoft & District Division One, 4th
Great Yarmouth Town Development	Beaconsfield, Great Yarmouth	
Kirkley & Pakefield U23	Walmer Road, Kirkley	5th
Loddon United Reserves	George Lane, Loddon	7th
Martham Reserves	5 Star Landscapes Ground, Martham	8th
Norton Athletic Reserves	Loddon Road, Norton Subcourse	10th
Rockland United	Green Lane, Attleborough	C&S Norfolk Division One, 1st
Southwold Town	York Road, Southwold	Lowestoft & District Division One, 2nd
Tacolneston Reserves	West Way, Tacolneston	C&S Norfolk Division One, 2nd
Wymondham Town Reserves	Kings Head Meadow, Wymondham	9th
Yelverton Reserves	Garrick Field, Yelverton	Division Three South, 15th

== Anglian Combination winners ==
The Sterry Cup which is handed to the winners of the Anglian Combination.

=== 1964–65 ===
For the league's first "transitional" season, the members of the amalgamating leagues were split into three tiers, "Senior", "Junior" and "Reserves". Each of these three tiers was split into two parallel divisions, designated simply "A" and "B".

Season	Senior A	Senior B	Junior A	Junior B	Reserves A	Reserve B
1964–65	C N S O B U	Dereham Town	York Athletic	Southwold Town	Gothic Reserves	Henderson Reserves

=== 1965–2003 ===
After the initial transitional season, the first teams in the league were split into four divisions, based on their finishing positions in the 1964–65 season. These became the Premier Division, Divisions 1, 2, and 3. Division 4 was added for the 1966–67 season. Reserve sides were similarly split into three divisions, Reserve Divisions 1, 2, and 3.

Season	Premier	One	Two	Three	Four	Res One	Res Two	Res Three
1965–66	C N S O B U	York Athletic	Horsford United	Poringland	N/A	Watton United Reserves	Thorpe Village Reserves	Norman Old Boys Reserves
1966–67	Watton United	Horsford United	North Walsham Town	Eaton Rangers	Hellesdon	Watton United Reserves	Bungay Town Reserves	Shipdham Reserves
1967–68	Watton United	Diss Town	Earlham Y C	Hellesdon	Birds Eye (Lowestoft)	Norman Old Boys Reserves	Reepham Town Reserves	Holt United Reserves
1968–69	Gorleston	St Andrews	Hellesdon	Birds Eye (Lowestoft)	Thetford Rovers	York Athletic Reserves	Holt United Reserves	Sextons Reserves
1969–70	Sheringham	Hellesdon	Birds Eye (Lowestoft)	Overstrand	Earlham Rangers	Watton United Reserves	Thorpe Village Reserves	Fakenham Town Reserves
1970–71	C N S O B U	Wymondham Town	Lakenham Y C	Boulton & Paul	Bodham	St Andrews Reserves	Hoveton United Reserves	Shipdham Reserves
1971–72	C N S O B U	Fakenham Town	Southrepps	Beccles Town	Stags	Hoveton United Reserves	Fakenham Town Reserves	Hellesdon Reserves
1972–73	Hellesdon	Reepham Town	Thetford Rovers	Salhouse	Gorleston Reserves	Henderson Reserves	Wymondham Old Boys Reserves	Norwich Lads Club Reserves
1973–74	C N S O B U	Diss Town	Swaffham Town	Carrow	Wells Town	Norwich Union Reserves	Thetford Rovers Reserves	Aylsham Wanderers Reserves
1974–75	C N S O B U	Bungay Town	Southwold Town	Newton Flotman	Wortwell	St Andrews Reserves	Fakenham Town Reserves	Newton Flotman Reserves
1975–76	St Andrews	Southwold United	Wroxham	Wortwell	Yarmouth Town Reserves	St Andrews Reserves	Newton Flotman Reserves	Sprowston Wanderers Reserves
1976–77	Diss Town	Wroxham	Newton Flotman	Gorleston Reserves	Mundham & Seething	St Andrews Reserves	Beccles Town Reserves	Earlham Spinney Reserves
1977–78	Lowestoft Town Reserves	Brundall United	Wortwell	Brandon Town	Town Hall	St Andrews Reserves	Sheringham Reserves	Holt United Reserves
1978–79	Diss Town	Newton Flotman	Kirkley	Lakeford Rangers	Bradenham Wanderers	Wroxham Reserves	Thetford Rovers Reserves	Wortwell Reserves
1979–80	Lowestoft Town Reserves	Kirkley	Lakeford Rangers	Bradenham Wanderers	Acle United	Fakenham Town Reserves	C E Y M S Reserves	Kirkley Reserves
1980–81	Hoveton United	Bungay Town	Gorleston Reserves	Harleston Town	South Walsham	Hoveton United Reserves	Kirkley Reserves	Bradenham Wanderers Reserves
1981–82	Wroxham	Wymondham Town	Harleston Town	Mundford	Mundham & Seething	Hoveton United Reserves	Bradenham Wanderers Reserves	Attleborough Reserves
1982–83	Wroxham	Gorleston Reserves	Bradenham Wanderers	Acle United	Hempnall	Wroxham Reserves	C E Y M S Reserves	Wells Town Reserves
1983–84	Wroxham	Blofield United	Swaffham Town	Hempnall	Mulbarton United	Wroxham Reserves	Wells Town Reserves	East Harling Reserves
1984–85	Wroxham	Thetford Rovers	Hempnall	Ashlea	North Walsham Town	Wroxham Reserves	Thetford Rovers Reserves	Loddon United Reserves
1985–86	Watton United	Wymondham Town	Wortwell	Thurton & Ashby	Mattishall	Watton United Reserves	Blofield United Reserves	Poringland United Reserves
1986–87	St Andrews	Ashlea	Aylsham Wanderers	Town Hall	Watton United Reserves	Wroxham Reserves	Aylsham Wanderers Reserves	Loddon United Reserves
1987–88	Wroxham	Bungay Town	Town Hall	Watton United	Beccles Caxton	Wroxham Reserves	Carrow Reserves	Hempnall Reserves
1988–89	Norwich United	Kirkley	Stalham Town	Poringland Wanderers	Wroxham Reserves	St Andrews Reserves	Overstrand Reserves	Ashlea Reserves
1989–90	Newton Flotman	Dereham Hobbies	Mulbarton United	Attleborough Town	Norwich United Reserves	Blofield United Reserves	Lakeford Rangers Reserves	Stalham Town Reserves
1990–91	Blofield United	Wymondham Town	Mattishall	Scole United	Corton	Newton Flotman Reserves	Stalham Town Reserves	Mulbarton United Reserves
1991–92	Overstrand	Horsford United	Diss Town Reserves	Town Hall Scripts	South Walsham	Wymondham Town Reserves	Mulbarton United Reserves	Reepham Town Reserves
1992–93	Mulbarton United	Wroxham Reserves	Thorpe Village	South Walsham	Anglian Windows	Carrow Reserves	Loddon United Reserves	Caister United Reserves
1993–94	Blofield United	Lowestoft Town Reserves	Poringland Wanderers	Anglian Windows	Halvergate United	Blofield United Reserves	Thorpe Village Reserves	C E Y M S Reserves
1994–95	Wroxham Reserves	Thorpe Village	North Walsham Town	Acle United	Hingham Athletic	St Andrews Reserves	Poringland Wanderers Reserves	Wortwell Reserves
1995–96	Horsford United	Loddon United	Attleborough Town	Scole United	Thetford Town Reserves	Blofield United	Beccles Town Reserves	Anglian Windows Reserves
1996–97	Mulbarton United	Acle United	Scole United	Swaffham Town Reserves	Downham Town Reserves	Acle United Reserves	Brandon Town Reserves	Aylsham Wanderers Reserves
1997–98	Dereham Town	Scole United	Wells Town	East Harling	Great Ryburgh	Acle United Reserves	Oulton Broad / L R Reserves	Thetford Rovers Reserves
1998–99	Attleborough Town	Lakeford Rangers	Sprowston Athletic	Watton United Reserves	Dereham Town Reserves	Acle United Reserves	Caister United Reserves	Saham Toney Reserves
1999–00	Kirkley	Sprowston Athletic	Norwich Union	Dereham Town Reserves	Hindringham	Acle United Reserves	Scole United Reserves	Wells Town Reserves
2000–01	Blofield United	Gorleston Reserves	Halvergate United	Holt United	Gayton United	Blofield United Reserves	Wells Town Reserves	Watton United Reserves
2001–02	Kirkley	Beccles Town	Hindringham	Gayton United	Fosters Athletic	Wells Town Reserves	Halvergate United Reserves	Fosters Athletic Reserves
2002–03	Kirkley	Halvergate United	Horsford United	Sheringham	Southwold Town	Kirkley Reserves	Norwich Union Reserves	Costessey Sports Reserves

=== 2003–2015 ===
In 2003 the league was re-organised, reducing the number of divisions from eight to seven. The reserve divisions were included within the main structure of the league, allowing the reserve teams the possibility of promotion to the divisions containing other clubs' first teams.

Season	Premier	One	Two	Three	Four	Five	Six
2003–04	Cromer Town	Watton United	Sheringham	Southwold Town	Sprowston Athletic Reserves	Norwich Union Reserves	Hindringham Reserves
2004–05	Blofield United	Sheringham	Southwold Town	Norwich St Johns	Kirkley Reserves	Cromer Town Reserves	Sprowston Wanderers Reserves
2005–06	Cromer Town	Dersingham Rovers	Mundford	Kirkley Reserves	Beccles Caxton	Thetford Rovers	Foulsham
2006–07	Blofield United	Hempnall	Kirkley Reserves	West Lynn SSC	Caister United Reserves	East Harling	Freethorpe
2007–08	Wroxham Reserves	Loddon United	Corton	Norwich CEYMS	Bradenham Wanderers	North Walsham Town Reserves	Gorleston Reserves
2008–09	Sheringham	St. Andrews	Norwich St. Johns	Mundford	North Walsham Town Reserves	Sheringham Reserves	Dersingham Rovers Reserves
2009–10	Blofield United	Kirkley & Pakefield Reserves	West Lynn SSC	Hempnall Reserves	Blofield United Reserves	Hemsby	Thetford Athletic
2010–11	Cromer Town	Wells Town	Norwich CEYMS	Harleston Town	University of East Anglia	Mulbarton Wanderers	Bradenham Wanderers Reserves
2011–12	Cromer Town	Dersingham Rovers	Harleston Town	Martham	Mulbarton Wanderers	Saham Toney	Yelverton
2012–13	Acle United	Norwich CEYMS	Foulsham	University of East Anglia	Waveney	Buxton	Redgate Rangers
2013–14	Acle United	Long Stratton	Scole United	Waveney	Fakenham Town Reserves	Redgate Rangers	Mulbarton Wanderers Reserves
2014–15	Acle United	Mulbarton Wanderers	Waveney	Blofield United Reserves	Redgate Rangers	Earsham	Scole United Reserves

=== 2015–2024 ===
To try and tackle the issue of travel costs for players and clubs at lower levels of the league, the Anglian Combination's bottom two divisions were regionalised into Division 5 North and South for the 2015–16 season. This meant that Division 6 ceased to exist. Travel costs are one of a number of reasons why teams fold in the lower divisions of the league and it is hoped that the new system will help slow and maybe even reverse the negative trend. Generally, the A47 road from King's Lynn to Great Yarmouth is the cutoff point for determining whether clubs in Division 5 are placed in the North or South division

Season	Premier	One	Two	Three	Four	Five (North)	Five (South)
2015–16	Acle United	Waveney	Mundford	Watton United	Sheringham Reserves	Bradenham Wanderers Reserves	Gorleston Reserves
2016–17	Spixworth	Bradenham Wanderers	University of East Anglia	Gayton United	Gorleston Reserves	Aylsham Reserves	Great Yarmouth Town Reserves
2017–18	Harleston Town	Wymondham Town	Easton	Gorleston Reserves	Bradenham Wanderers Reserves	University of East Anglia Reserves	Beccles Town Reserves
2018–19	Sheringham	University of East Anglia	Gorleston Reserves	Heacham	Castle Acre Swifts	Dussindale Rovers	Belton
2019–20 (first placed teams still promoted)	Void	Void	Void	Void	Void	Void	Void
2020–21 (first placed teams still promoted)	Void	Void	Void	Void	Void	Void	Void
2021–22	Heacham	Aylsham	Wymondham Town	Beccles Town Reserves	Mutford & Wrentham	Briston	Tacolneston
2022–23	Dussindale & Hellesdon Rovers	Easton	Watton United	Mutford & Wrentham	East Harling Reserves	KLSC	Redgrave Rangers
2023–24	Gorleston Reserves	Watton United	Mutford & Wrentham	Dussindale & Hellesdon Rovers Reserves	Watlington SSC	Sprowston Reserves	Sprowston 'A'

=== 2024–present ===
From the 2024–25 season onwards, Division Five was removed entirely. Instead, Divisions Three and Four were split into North and South.

Season	Premier	One	Two	Three (North)	Three (South)	Four (North)	Four (South)
2024–25	Acle United	Mutford & Wrentham	Norton Athletic	Watlington	Mulbarton Wanderers Reserves	North Walsham Town Reserves	Lowestoft Town Reserves
2025–26	Norwich United	Holt United	Attleborough Town	Feltwell United	Martham	Terrington Tigers	Hethersett Athletic

=== Premier Division league titles by club ===
Club	Winners	Winning seasons
Blofield United	6	1990–91, 1993–94, 2000–01, 2004–05, 2006–07, 2009–10
Acle United	5	2012–13, 2013–14, 2014–15, 2015–16, 2024–25
Wroxham	5	1981–82, 1982–83, 1983–84, 1984–85, 1987–88
C.N.S.O.B.U	5	1965–66, 1970–71, 1971–72, 1973–74, 1974–75
Cromer Town	4	2003–04, 2005–06, 2010–11, 2011–12
Sheringham	3	1969–70, 2008–09, 2018–19
Kirkley	3	1999–00, 2001–02, 2002–03
Watton United	3	1966–67, 1967–68, 1985–86
Norwich United	2	1988–89, 2025–26
Wroxham Reserves	2	1994–95, 2007–08
Mulbarton United	2	1992–93, 1996–97
St. Andrews	2	1975–76, 1986–87
Lowestoft Town Reserves	2	1977–78, 1979–80
Diss Town	2	1976–77, 1978–79
Gorleston Reserves	1	2023–24
Dussindale & Hellesdon Rovers	1	2022–23
Heacham	1	2021–22
Harleston Town	1	2017–18
Spixworth	1	2016–17
Attleborough Town	1	1998–99
Dereham Town	1	1997–98
Horsford United	1	1995–96
Overstrand	1	1991–92
Newton Flotman	1	1989–90
Hoveton United	1	1980–81
Hellesdon	1	1972–73
Gorleston	1	1968–69

== Cup competitions ==
In addition to the league, clubs take part in the following cup competitions:

- Don Frost Memorial Cup

Single match between the winners of the Senior League (Mummery) Cup and the winners of the Premier Division from the previous season.

- Senior League Cup

Cup competition for all clubs in the Premier Division and Division 1. The two teams drawn together for each tie play one match with extra-time then penalties separating the sides.

- Junior League Cup

Cup competition for any side competing in Divisions 2–5 plus the reserve sides of Eastern Counties League clubs competing in the Norfolk or Suffolk county cups. The two teams drawn together for each tie play one match with extra-time then penalties separating the sides.

- Reserve League Cup

Cup competition for any of the reserve sides in Divisions 2–5.

- Norfolk Senior Cup

Norfolk's premier cup competition with all teams from Norfolk that play in the Premier Division, Division 1 and any Norfolk sides that compete in the Eastern Counties League.

- Norfolk Junior County Cup

Main cup competition for junior sides from Norfolk that compete in Divisions 2–5 of the league as well as sides from the lower leagues.

- Suffolk Senior County Cup

Open to teams from Suffolk that play in the Premier Division and Division 1 as well as Suffolk teams playing in the Eastern Counties League.

- Suffolk Junior County Cup

Cup competition for teams from Suffolk in Divisions 2–5 as well as reserve sides of clubs that are in the Eastern Counties League that are competing in the Suffolk Senior Cup.
