= Watton United F.C. =

Association football club in England

Coordinates: 52°34′31.48″N 0°49′29.94″E

Watton United
- Full name: Watton United Football Club
- Nickname: The Brecklanders
- Founded: 1888
- Ground: Watton Sports Centre, Watton
- League: Anglian Combination Premier Division
- 2024–25: Anglian Combination Premier Division, 12th of 16

Watton United Football Club is an English football club based in Watton, Norfolk. The club are currently members of the Anglian Combination Premier Division and play at Watton Sports Centre.

== History ==
The club was established in 1888 and for over half a century played in local leagues. They won the Dereham & District League in 1949–50 and were elected to Division Two of the East Anglian League. They won the division at the first attempt, and were promoted to Division One. In 1952–53 they won the league cup. After the league merged into the Anglian Combination in 1964, Watton won the league and league cup double in 1966–67. They won the league again the following season and won the league cup for a second time in 1969–70.

The club were relegated to Division One at the end of the 1974–75 season, but made an immediate return after finishing as runners-up the following season. They won the Premier Division again in 1985–86 and were promoted to the Eastern Counties League. In their first season in the ECL they finished eighth, and won the Norfolk Senior Cup for the first time with a 3–1 win over Poringland United. In 1989–90 they drew 19 of their 40 matches, an ECL record.

After the club's floodlights failed standards tests, they were unable to meet ECL requirements and resigned from the league in April 2000. The following season they took their reserves' place in Division Two of the Anglian Combination. They finished second in their first season in the division, earning promotion to Division One. The following season they were Division One champions and were promoted to the Premier Division. They were relegated back to Division One at the end of the 2005–06 season, but returned after finishing as runners-up in 2007–08. They were relegated back to Division One at the end of the 2009–10 season.

Prior to the 2013–14 season financial problems caused the club to withdraw its first team from Division One, with the first team taking over from the reserves in Division Five. The club finished third in Division Five, and were promoted to Division Four at the end of the season. In 2014–15 they were promoted again after finishing fourth, and went on to win Division Three in 2015–16, earning promotion to Division Two. A third-place finish in Division Two in 2016–17 saw them win promotion to Division One.

The 2021–22 season saw Watton finish second-from-bottom of Division One, resulting in relegation to Division Two. However, they were Division Two champions the following season, earning an immediate return to Division One. The club went on to win the Division One title in 2023–24, securing promotion to the Premier Division.

== Ground ==
The club were already playing at the Memorial Sports Field before it became the town's sports centre in 1974. A record attendance of 1,000 was set for the official switch on of new floodlights, a match against Norwich City on 30 April 1985. The ground only has three sides as it also incorporates a cricket pitch. A large extension to the sports centre resulted in the club having the largest tea bar in non-League football.

== Honours ==
- Anglian Combination
  - Premier Division champions 1966–67, 1967–68, 1985–86
  - Division One champions 2003–04, 2023–24
  - Division Two champions 2022–23
  - Division Three champions 2015–16
  - League Cup winners 1966–67, 1969–70
- East Anglian League
  - Division Two champions 1950–51
  - League Cup winners 1952–53
- Dereham & District League
  - Champions 1949–50
- Norfolk Senior Cup
  - Winners 1986–87

== Records ==
- Best FA Cup performance: First qualifying round, 1988–89, 1992–93, 1993–94, 1995–96
- Best FA Vase performance: Third round, 1986–87, 1999–2000
