= University of East Anglia F.C. =

Coordinates: 52°40′56.68″N 0°58′20.93″E

University of East Anglia
- Full name: University of East Anglia Football Club
- Ground: Aldiss Park, Dereham
- Capacity: 2,500 (150 seated)
- Manager: Paul Neary
- League: Anglian Combination Premier Division
- 2024–25: Anglian Combination Premier Division, 10th of 16
Home colours

University of East Anglia Football Club is a football club based in Norwich, England, and are the football team of the University of East Anglia. They are currently members of the Anglian Combination Premier Division and play at Aldiss Park, groundsharing with Dereham Town.

== History ==
In 2007, University of East Anglia joined the Anglian Combination. In 2019, following six promotions in the Anglian Combination system, the club were promoted to the Premier Division. In 2021, the club was admitted into the Eastern Counties League Division One. The club entered the FA Vase for the first time in 2021–22.

== Ground ==
In 2020, University of East Anglia moved to Aldiss Park, groundsharing with Dereham Town. Prior to moving to the ground, the club used the university's facilities at Colney Lane in Norwich.
