= Sheringham F.C. =

Association football club in England

Coordinates: 52°56′27.62″N 1°11′51.28″E

Sheringham
- Full name: Sheringham Football Club
- Nickname: The Shannocks
- Founded: 1897
- Ground: Weybourne Road, Sheringham
- Chairman: Noah Kloo
- Manager: Matt Hoeppner
- League: Anglian Combination Premier Division
- 2024–25: Eastern Counties League Premier Division, 20th of 20 (resigned)
Home colours

Sheringham Football Club is a football club based in Sheringham, England and was established in 1897. They are currently members of the Anglian Combination Premier Division and play at Weybourne Road. Nicknamed "The Shannocks", the club are affiliated to the Norfolk County FA.

== History ==
The club was established in 1897. They played in the Norfolk & Suffolk League, finishing bottom of the league in 1949–50. In 1957–58 they were league champions. In 1964 the league merged with the East Anglian League to form the Anglian Combination, with Sheringham placed in the Premier Division. The club were Premier Division runners-up in 1968–69 and champions the following season, before winning the league's Senior Knock-Out Cup in 1970–71.

Having sunk into the lower divisions by the early 2000s, Sheringham were Division Three champions in 2002–03. They went on to win the Division Two and Division One titles in successive seasons, earning promotion to the Premier Division. In 2008–09 the club won the Premier Division title for the first time since 1970. Although they were relegated to Division One at the end of the 2014–15 season, the club were Division One runners-up in 2017–18, resulting in promotion back to the Premier Division.

After winning the Anglian Combination Premier Division title for a third time in 2018–19, Sheringham were promoted to Division One North of the Eastern Counties League.

On 3 October 2025, it was confirmed via the club's social media. that the first team had ceased operations until further notice due to lack of funding. Sheringham's youth teams would continue playing.

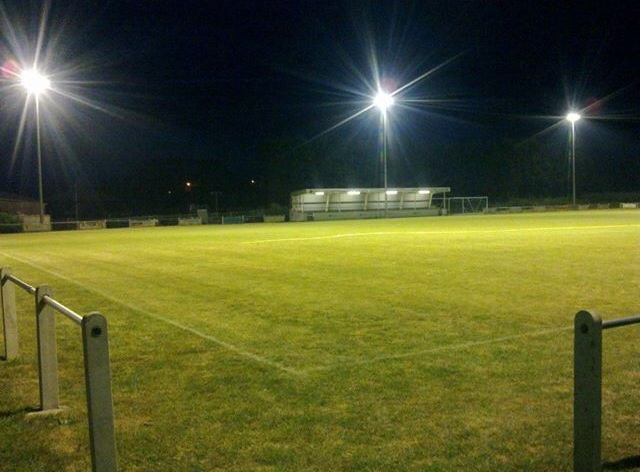
Sheringham's Weybourne Road ground

== Honours ==
- Anglian Combination
  - Premier Division champions 1969–70, 2008–09, 2018–19
  - Division One champions 2004–05
  - Division Two champions 2003–04
  - Division Three champions 2002–03
  - Senior KO Cup winners 1970–71
- Norfolk & Suffolk League
  - Champions 1957–58
- Cromer Lifeboat Cup
  - Winners 1956, 1966, 1968, 1986, 1988, 1998, 2000, 2004, 2005

== Records ==
- Best FA Cup performance: Second qualifying round, 1952–53, 1956–57, 1957–58, 2022-23

== See also ==
- Sheringham F.C. players
- Sheringham F.C. managers
