= East Anglian League =

- Founded: 1903
- Folded: 1964
- Country: England

The East Anglian League was a football league in the East Anglia region of England.

== History ==
The league was established in 1903 as the South East Anglian League. The founder member clubs were Chelmsford City, Colchester Crown, Colchester Town, Harwich & Parkeston and Ipswich Town, with Ipswich winning the inaugural league title. In 1908 it was renamed the East Anglian League. By the 1960s the league was dominated by clubs from Norfolk and in 1964 it merged with the Norfolk & Suffolk League (also largely consisting of Norfolk-based clubs) to form the Anglian Combination.

== Champions ==
Season	Division One	Division Two
1903–04	Ipswich Town	
1904–05	Colchester Crown	
1905–06	Kings Own Scot Borders	
1906–07	Colchester Crown	
1907–08	King's Royal Rifles Corps	
1908–09	Norwich City Reserves	
1909–10	Norwich City Reserves	
1910–11	Norwich City Reserves	
1911–12	Norwich City Reserves	
1912–13	Norwich City Reserves	
1913–14		
1919–20		
1920–21		
1921–22		
1922–23		
1923–24		
1924–25		
1925–26		
1926–27		
1927–28		
1928–29		
1929–30		
1930–31		
1931–32		
1932–33		
1933–34		
1934–35	Eastern Coachworks	
1935–36		
1936–37		
1937–38		
1938–39		
1939–40	Cambridge Town	
1940–41	Cambridge Town	
1941–42	Cambridge Town	
1942–43	Cambridge Town	
1943–44		
1944–45	Cambridge Town	
1945–46		
1946–47		
1947–48	Carrow	
1948–49	Carrow	
1949–50	Thorpe	
1950–51	North Walsham	
1951–52	North Walsham Town	
1952–53	Gorleston Reserves	
1953–54	Norman Old Boys	
1954–55	RAF Horsham St Faith	
1955–56	RAF Horsham St Faith	
1956–57	Great Yarmouth Town Reserves	
1957–58	Lowestoft Town Reserves	
1958–59	Norman Old Boys	
1959–60	Norwich City 'B'	Costessey Sports
1960–61	Norwich City 'B'	Oulton Broad
1961–62	Norman Old Boys	
1962–63	Holt United	Great Yarmouth Town Reserves
1963–64	Lowestoft Town Reserves	

== Member clubs ==
- Ashill
- Ashlea Lowestoft
- Attleborough Town
- Beccles
- Beccles Caxton
- Blofield & District
- Bury St Edmunds
- Bungay Town Reserves
- Cambridge Town
- Cambridge United
- Carrow
- Chelmsford
- Chemicals
- Colchester Crown
- Colchester Town
- Coltishall
- Corton
- Costessey Sports
- East Harling
- Eastern Coachworks
- Eastern Coachworks Reserves
- Eaton Rangers
- Gorleston
- Gorleston Reserves
- Great Yarmouth Town
- Great Yarmouth Town Reserves
- Harleston Town
- Harwich & Parkeston
- Henderson United
- Holt United
- Horsford United
- Ipswich Town
- Kings Own Scot Borders
- Kirkley
- Kirkley Reserves
- Leicester Regiment
- Leiston
- Leiston St Margarets
- Loddon United
- Lowestoft BSRA
- Lowestoft Corinthinans
- Lowestoft Town
- Lowestoft Town Reserves
- Lowestoft Railway Social
- Lynn Town
- Mann-Egerton
- Mundeseley United
- Norfolk Regiment
- Norman Old Boys
- North Walsham Town
- Northampton Regiment
- Norwich CEYMS Reserves
- Norwich City Reserves
- Norwich City 'B'
- Norwich Defiants
- Norwich Liberals
- Norwich Speedways
- St Andrew's
- Norwich Union
- Orwell Works
- Oulton Broad
- RAF Horsham St Faith
- RAF Swinton Manor
- RAF Watton
- Shipdham
- Southwold Town
- Stalham Town
- Swaffham Town
- Thorpe
- Watton United
- West Yorkshire Regiment
- Wrentham
- Wroxham
- Wymondham Old Boys
- Wymondham Town
- York Athletic
