= Wymondham Town F.C. =

Association football club in England

Wymondham Town
- Full name: Wymondham Town Football Club
- Founded: 1883
- Ground: King's Head Meadow
- Manager: Tony Dance and Phil Crawford
- League: Anglian Combination Division Three South
- 2025–26: Anglian Combination Division Two, 14th of 15 (relegated)
Home colours

Wymondham Town Football Club is a football club based in Wymondham, Norfolk, England. They are currently members of the Anglian Combination Division One and play at King's Head Meadow. The club is an FA Charter Standard Club affiliated to the Norfolk County Football Association.

== History ==
The club was founded in 1883. The club played in the local Norwich league, until 1906, when they left to only play friendlies, but three years later the club folded in 1909, with a debt of £2. The club reformed in 1912 when Wymondham Church Lads took over the club's name and the club played in a local Norwich league. In 1935 the club joined the East Anglian League.

After the war the club joined the Norfolk & Suffolk League in 1946. The 1950–51 season saw the club enter the FA Cup for the first time, something they did for the next five seasons. When the Norfolk & Suffolk League merged with the East Anglian League to form the Anglian Combination in 1964, the club were placed in Section B of the new league. The club won the Division One championship five times in the Anglian Combination, each time gaining promotion to the Premier Division, but spending no more than four seasons in a row in the top division.

== Ground ==
The club has played its home games at King's Head Meadow since its formation in 1883.

== Honours ==
- Anglian Combination
  - Division One Champions (5) 1970–71, 1981–82, 1985–86, 1990–91, 2017–18
- Norfolk Senior Cup
  - Winners (2) 1887–88, 1888–89

== See also ==
- Wymondham Town F.C. players
