= Dereham Town F.C. =

Association football club in England

Coordinates: 52°40′56.68″N 0°58′20.93″E

Dereham Town
- Full name: Dereham Town Football Club
- Nickname: The Magpies
- Founded: 1884
- Ground: Aldiss Park, Dereham
- Capacity: 2,500 (150 seated)
- Chairman: Daniel McIlwrath
- Manager: Rossi Jarvis / Ryan Honeyman
- League: Eastern Counties League Premier Division
- 2025–26: Eastern Counties League Premier Division, 10th of 18
- Website: derehamtownfc.co.uk
Home colours	Away colours

Dereham Town Football Club is a football club based in Dereham, Norfolk, England. They are currently members of the Eastern Counties League Premier Division and play at Aldiss Park.

== History ==
The club was founded as Dereham Football Club in 1884, spending many of its early years in the Dereham & District League. In 1891–92 the club reached the final of the Norfolk Senior Cup, losing to CEYMS. By 1910 the club were playing in the Norwich & District League and had been renamed East Dereham. In 1920 they adopted their current name and in 1935 they joined the Norfolk & Suffolk League, which had lost several clubs to the newly established Eastern Counties League. When the Norfolk & Suffolk League merged into the Anglian Combination, the club were placed in the Senior B Division. They won the division at the first attempt and were promoted Premier Division. They were renamed Dereham Hobbies United in 1986 after a local Sunday league team merged into the club. The club were relegated from the Premier Division at the end of the 1988–89 season, but made an immediate return to the Premier Division as Division One champions. In 1991 they returned to the name Dereham Town.

In 1997–98 Dereham won the Anglian Combination Premier Division, earning promotion to Division One of the Eastern Counties League, also winning the Don Frost Memorial Cup. In 2001–02 the club finished second in Division One, beating Stanway Rovers 1–0 on the final day to overtake them and earn promotion to the Premier Division. The club won the Norfolk Senior Cup in 2006, defeating Norwich United 1–0 in the final, and again in 2007 when Wroxham were beaten 1–0 in the final. In 2012–13 they won the Eastern Counties League Premier Division, earning promotion to Division One North of the Isthmian League. The club won the Norfolk Senior Cup for the fourth time in 2015–16, defeating Norwich United 2–0 in the final. A fifth Senior Cup was won in 2018–19, when Dereham beat Thetford Town 2–1 in the final.

In 2022 Dereham were transferred to Division One Midlands of the Northern Premier League. After finishing fourth-from-bottom of the division in 2022–23 they were relegated back to the Premier Division of the Eastern Counties League.

=== Reserve team ===
After the club were promoted to the Isthmian League, the reserve team joined Division One of the Eastern Counties League, moving up from the reserve division. They left the league at the end of the 2016–17 season.

== Ground ==
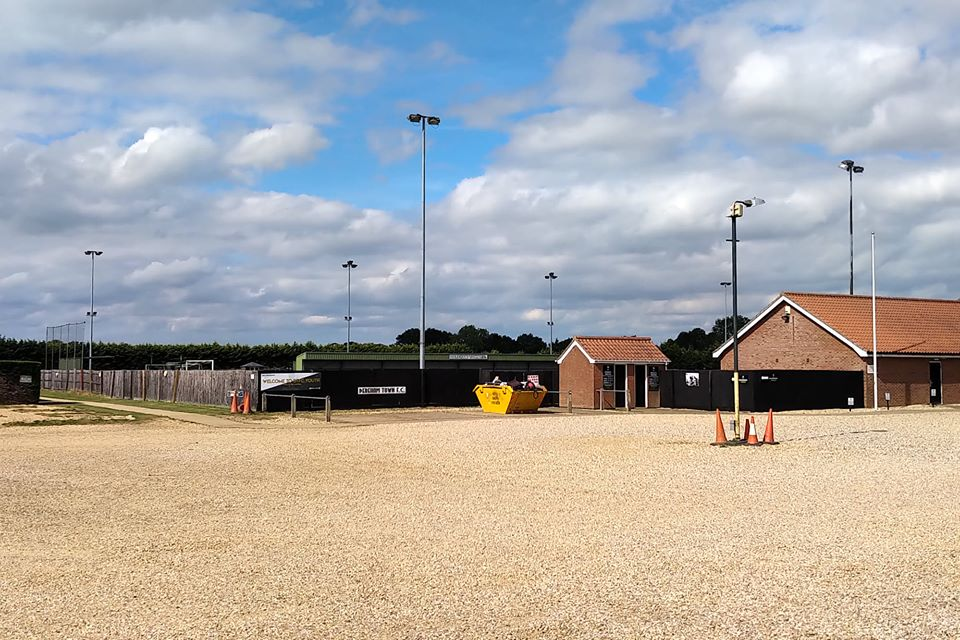
External view of Aldiss Park, the home ground of Dereham Town

Prior to World War II the club played at Bayfields Meadow, after which they moved to the Recreation Ground. However, the council owned the ground and there was no scope for upgrading it. In 1991, the club purchased a 10.2-acre (41,000 m^{2}) site on the outskirts of the town in order to build a new £750,000 stadium.

The club moved to the new ground at Aldiss Park in December 1996. At the start of 2000–01 season Norwich City visited Aldiss Park for a pre-season friendly and although the club lost 9–0, a new record attendance of 1,800 was set. Norwich City visited for another friendly match in July 2001, with a new record of 3,000 being set.

== Current squad ==
As of 7 December 2024

Note: Flags indicate national team as defined under FIFA eligibility rules; some limited exceptions apply. Players may hold more than one non-FIFA nationality.

Pos.	Nation	Player
GK	ENG	Ben Self
DF	ENG	Andy Eastaugh
DF	ENG	Grant Holt
DF	ENG	Toby Oliver
DF	ENG	Harry Pitcher
DF	ENG	Alfie Sandon
DF	ENG	Max Voutt
DF	ENG	Sam Watts (captain)
MF	ENG	Dylan Derbyshire

Pos.	Nation	Player
MF	ENG	Michael Ellis
MF	ENG	Mac Gee
MF	ENG	Jordan Lake
MF	ENG	Rhys Logan
MF	ENG	Max Melanson
MF	ENG	Jamie North
MF	ENG	Brad Spooner
FW	ENG	Ronnie Blois
FW	ENG	Charlie Clarke

The Eastern Counties Football League does not use a squad numbering system.

== Honours ==
- Eastern Counties league
  - Premier Division champions 2012–13
- Anglian Combination
  - Premier Division champions 1997–98
  - Division One champions 1989–90
  - Senior Cup winners 1993–94
- Norfolk Senior Cup
  - Winners 2005–06, 2006–07, 2010–11, 2015–16, 2018–19

== Records ==
- Best FA Cup performance: Third qualifying round, 2012–13
- Best FA Trophy performance: Third qualifying round, 2020–21
- Best FA Vase performance: Fifth round, 2008–09
- Record attendance: 3,000 vs Norwich City, friendly match, July 2001

== See also ==
- Dereham Town F.C. players
- Dereham Town F.C. managers
