= Norwich CEYMS F.C. =

English foot ball club based in Swardeston, Norfolk

Coordinates: 52°34′59.48″N 1°15′13.12″E

Norwich CEYMS
- Full name: Norwich CEYMS Football Club
- Nickname(s): Church
- Founded: 22 August 1888
- Ground: Hilltops Sports Ground, Swardeston
- League: Anglian Combination Premier Division
- 2023–24: Anglian Combination Premier Division, 10th of 16
Home colours	Away colours

Norwich Church of England Young Men's Society Football Club, commonly called Norwich CEYMS, is a football club based in Swardeston, near Norwich, in Norfolk, England. They are currently members of the Anglian Combination Premier Division, having previously played in the Eastern Counties League. It has been suggested that the world's oldest football song, "On The Ball, City", was used for CEYMS before being adopted by Norwich City.

The club is affiliated to the Norfolk County FA.

== History ==
Formed by the local branch of the Church of England Young Men's Society on 22 August 1888, the club was known locally as "Churches". They won the Norfolk Senior Cup in 1891–92 and 1896–97. In 1897 they were founder members of the Norfolk & Suffolk League, winning it in 1899–1900, losing only a single match. They then won the Senior Cup three times in a row between 1900 and 1902. Frustrated by a perceived lack of ambition, in 1902 the team's captain (Robert Webster) and vice-captain (Joseph Cowper Nutchey) left to form a new club, Norwich City, which also joined the Norfolk & Suffolk League. City finished above CEYMS in their first season, and although CEYMS won the league again in 1906–07 and 1910–11, Norwich City went on to become the dominant team in Norwich.

The club won the Norfolk & Suffolk League again in 1935–36, and joined the Eastern Counties League in 1937 and finished eighth in 1937–38 and twelfth in 1938–39. The 1939–40 season was abandoned due to the outbreak of World War II, and due to the high travelling costs the club left the league before it resumed in 1946, rejoining the Norfolk & Suffolk League. They were invited to rejoin the Eastern Counties League in 1963, but after initially accepting the offer, it was later turned down. When the Norfolk & Suffolk League merged into the Anglian Combination in 1964 they were placed in the Premier Division, but were relegated to Division One at the end of the 1969–70 season, and to Division Two at the end of 1973–74. They were promoted back to Division One in 1984–85, but were relegated at the end of the following season.

In 2005–06 CEYMS finished as runners-up in Division Three and were promoted to Division Two. However, they were relegated the following season. In 2007–08 they won Division Three to make an immediate return to Division Two. CEYMS gained promotion to Division One at the end of the 2010–11 season. In 2012–13 the club won Division One with a record points total, earning promotion to the Premier Division.

== Grounds ==
The club initially played at "The Rec" on Earlham Road, a ground which also reportedly included the best cycle track in England. After World War II they moved to Norwich City's old Newmarket Road ground, now owned by Town Close School. They remained at the site until the school required the ground for its own use, at which point they moved to another ground on Newmarket Road known as the Civil Service Ground. In 1988 they relocated to their current site in Swardeston.

== Honours ==
- Norfolk & Suffolk League
  - Champions 1899–1900, 1906–07, 1910–11, 1935–36
- Norfolk Senior Cup
  - Winners 1891–92, 1896–97, 1899–1900, 1901–02, 1903–04
- East Anglian Cup
  - Winners 1984–85
- Anglian Combination
  - Division One champions 2012–13
  - Division Two champions 1985–86, 2010–11
  - Division Three champions 2007–08

== Records ==
- Best FA Cup performance: Fourth qualifying round, 1906–07
