= 2013–14 Eastern Counties Football League =

The 2013–14 season was the 72nd in the history of Eastern Counties Football League a football competition in England. The season started on 10 August 2013 and finished on 26 April 2014.

Hadleigh United were champions, winning their first Eastern Counties Football League title, while Brightlingsea Regent were promoted to the Isthmian League for the first time in their history.

== Premier Division ==
Eastern Counties Football League Premier Division
- Season: 2013–14
- Champions: Hadleigh United
- Promoted: Brightlingsea Regent
- Relegated: Woodbridge Town
- Matches: 380
- Goals: 1,349 (3.55 per match)

The Premier Division featured 18 clubs which competed in the division last season, along with two new clubs, promoted from Division One:

- Brightlingsea Regent
- Newmarket Town

=== League table ===
Pos	Team	Pld	W	D	L	GF	GA	GD	Pts	Promotion or relegation
1	Hadleigh United	38	26	5	7	105	48	+57	83	
2	Brightlingsea Regent	38	25	8	5	87	41	+46	83	Promoted to the Isthmian League
3	Felixstowe & Walton United	38	24	9	5	85	45	+40	81	
4	Gorleston	38	23	9	6	90	63	+27	78	
5	Godmanchester Rovers	38	24	5	9	82	43	+39	77	
6	Norwich United	38	22	7	9	63	42	+21	73	
7	Haverhill Rovers	38	20	3	15	66	55	+11	63	
8	Walsham-le-Willows	38	17	10	11	79	54	+25	61	
9	Newmarket Town	38	15	13	10	76	66	+10	58	
10	Mildenhall Town	38	16	9	13	74	54	+20	57	
11	Brantham Athletic	38	15	8	15	71	75	−4	53	
12	Kirkley & Pakefield	38	14	8	16	67	72	−5	50	
13	Stanway Rovers	38	12	8	18	66	65	+1	44	
14	Cambridge Regional College	38	12	3	23	66	70	−4	39	Club folded
15	Clacton	38	7	12	19	55	84	−29	33	
16	Thetford Town	38	7	9	22	48	83	−35	30	
17	Ely City	38	8	6	24	49	85	−36	30	
18	Diss Town	38	8	5	25	47	102	−55	29	
19	Wivenhoe Town	38	6	7	25	33	79	−46	25	
20	Woodbridge Town	38	5	4	29	40	123	−83	19	Relegated to Division One

Source: fchd
Rules for classification: 1) points; 2) goal difference; 3) number of goals scored.

=== Results ===
Home \ Away	BRA	BRI	CRC	DIS	ELY	FCC	FEL	GOD	GOR	HAD	HAV	KIR	MIL	NEW	NOR	STA	THE	WAL	WIV	WOO
Brantham Athletic		1–2	3–2	4–1	3–0	1–1	0–6	0–2	0–0	0–4	1–2	1–3	3–1	1–0	2–0	2–1	2–2	0–2	4–1	5–0
Brightlingsea Regent	3–1		2–1	3–1	2–0	3–0	2–0	2–1	5–0	2–4	4–1	6–2	1–1	2–2	2–1	2–1	2–0	2–2	5–0	4–0
Cambridge Regional College	2–4	2–0		4–0	0–1	3–1	1–2	1–2	1–2	1–2	1–2	1–1	2–0	2–2	1–2	0–3	0–2	2–0	0–0	5–1
Diss Town	3–3	0–0	3–1		1–3	3–3	1–2	1–2	1–3	1–5	1–1	0–3	1–1	3–1	1–3	4–3	2–3	0–11	2–1	3–1
Ely City	1–4	1–3	2–3	1–2		0–1	2–3	1–5	1–3	0–5	2–4	0–2	1–3	1–3	0–2	2–1	3–3	0–4	0–1	1–1
Clacton	1–1	2–2	1–2	3–0	3–4		1–3	2–3	1–2	0–4	2–2	2–1	2–2	1–4	1–1	2–1	2–1	1–2	2–0	2–3
Felixstowe & Walton United	1–1	1–3	3–1	4–1	1–1	3–3		2–1	4–4	4–1	1–0	2–1	2–1	6–2	2–2	3–3	4–0	1–1	1–0	1–0
Godmanchester Rovers	2–0	2–2	1–0	3–2	2–3	6–2	0–2		0–0	1–0	0–1	1–1	2–0	0–0	4–2	0–1	1–0	0–2	5–0	2–1
Gorleston	3–1	2–2	3–2	4–0	3–1	1–1	1–2	2–4		3–1	1–0	5–2	4–3	2–2	5–4	3–0	3–0	0–0	2–1	4–0
Hadleigh United	5–1	1–0	3–1	3–0	3–2	3–0	1–0	2–4	2–2		1–0	7–0	2–1	1–1	0–1	5–2	4–1	2–3	3–1	4–0
Haverhill Rovers	4–2	0–1	1–2	0–3	3–2	4–0	3–2	3–4	4–1	1–1		2–1	2–0	2–1	2–4	0–1	3–0	1–2	3–0	2–0
Kirkley & Pakefield	1–2	1–3	4–2	3–1	0–2	1–1	0–1	0–2	0–1	3–1	2–1		0–0	4–1	0–0	2–1	5–3	3–3	2–1	2–3
Mildenhall Town	4–1	2–0	4–2	4–0	1–1	4–1	0–1	1–3	1–1	1–4	3–0	3–3		0–1	1–2	2–1	3–3	2–1	2–0	7–0
Newmarket Town	1–2	0–0	2–1	3–0	1–1	2–1	1–3	1–0	5–7	3–4	4–1	2–2	4–4		5–2	2–1	2–2	1–0	2–2	2–0
Norwich United	1–0	1–3	2–1	1–0	1–0	2–0	1–0	1–0	1–2	2–2	0–2	1–0	1–0	3–1		0–1	3–0	1–1	1–1	4–1
Stanway Rovers	3–3	1–2	3–2	3–1	1–0	1–1	2–2	0–4	4–2	2–3	0–1	3–1	0–2	4–4	0–0		0–2	1–1	0–1	9–1
Thetford Town	3–3	0–2	1–5	1–0	2–3	4–4	0–1	1–1	1–5	1–2	0–1	1–2	0–1	0–3	0–2	2–1		1–2	2–2	2–1
Walsham-le-Willows	4–2	1–3	3–1	3–1	2–1	3–2	1–1	2–4	5–1	1–3	2–0	1–3	1–3	1–1	0–2	0–3	0–2		4–0	2–2
Wivenhoe Town	1–3	1–3	1–3	4–1	0–2	0–1	1–3	2–3	1–2	1–1	0–2	2–1	0–3	0–3	1–3	1–1	2–1	1–1		1–0
Woodbridge Town	2–4	4–2	1–5	1–2	3–3	2–1	1–5	0–5	0–1	1–6	3–5	3–5	1–3	0–1	0–3	0–3	1–1	0–5	2–1	

Source: Mitoo
Legend: Blue = home team win; Yellow = draw; Red = away team win.

== Division One ==
Eastern Counties Football League Division One
- Season: 2013–14
- Champions: Whitton United
- Promoted: Fakenham Town; Ipswich Wanderers; Whitton United
- Matches: 342
- Goals: 1,244 (3.64 per match)

Division One featured 15 clubs which competed in the division last season, along with four new clubs:

- AFC Sudbury reserves
- Dereham Town reserves
- Haverhill Borough, promoted from Essex and Suffolk Border Football League
- Needham Market reserves

=== League table ===
Pos	Team	Pld	W	D	L	GF	GA	GD	Pts	Promotion
1	Whitton United	36	25	8	3	79	36	+43	83	Promoted to the Premier Division
2	Fakenham Town	36	23	8	5	94	33	+61	77	Promoted to the Premier Division
3	Ipswich Wanderers	36	23	6	7	97	37	+60	75	Promoted to the Premier Division
4	Haverhill Borough	36	23	5	8	65	37	+28	74	
5	Saffron Walden Town	36	20	10	6	91	45	+46	70	
6	Halstead Town	36	21	7	8	80	39	+41	70	
7	Swaffham Town	36	21	5	10	94	47	+47	68	
8	Great Yarmouth Town	36	19	8	9	82	50	+32	65	
9	Braintree Town reserves	36	17	7	12	65	54	+11	58	
10	Team Bury	36	16	6	14	58	53	+5	54	
11	Long Melford	36	14	2	20	51	68	−17	44	
12	Debenham LC	36	11	7	18	58	63	−5	40	
13	Dereham Town reserves	36	9	8	19	57	67	−10	35	
14	Stowmarket Town	36	11	1	24	53	94	−41	34	
15	Needham Market reserves	36	10	2	24	52	98	−46	32	
16	AFC Sudbury reserves	36	10	2	24	49	114	−65	32	
17	Downham Town	36	6	5	25	47	120	−73	23	
18	Cornard United	36	6	3	27	41	96	−55	21	
19	March Town United	36	4	6	26	31	93	−62	18	

Source: fchd
Rules for classification: 1) points; 2) goal difference; 3) number of goals scored.

=== Results ===
Home \ Away	AFS	BRA	COR	DEB	DER	DOW	FAK	GYT	HAL	HAV	IPS	LOM	MAR	NEM	SAF	STO	SWA	TBU	WHI
AFC Sudbury reserves		1–1	6–1	3–1	1–3	0–7	0–10	5–0	1–2	0–2	0–9	1–3	2–1	0–7	4–1	5–1	1–6	1–4	0–1
Braintree Town reserves	6–2		2–1	1–0	2–1	2–3	0–3	2–2	2–2	0–2	2–3	1–3	1–1	3–0	0–1	2–0	3–2	1–0	2–2
Cornard United	0–1	0–1		2–1	2–3	2–2	1–4	0–1	0–2	1–2	0–3	1–4	0–5	4–0	2–3	2–3	1–5	0–1	0–2
Debenham LC	0–2	0–3	1–3		5–2	4–1	1–3	0–2	0–3	2–2	0–1	4–2	2–0	3–4	0–0	4–0	4–2	0–1	2–2
Dereham Town reserves	1–2	1–4	8–1	2–2		5–1	2–2	1–2	2–3	1–1	0–2	2–0	1–0	2–1	1–3	3–2	1–1	2–2	0–3
Downham Town	1–2	1–0	1–2	1–3	1–1		0–5	4–4	0–4	0–3	1–6	3–0	1–1	5–1	1–4	2–3	1–5	1–5	1–4
Fakenham Town	1–0	4–4	8–0	2–1	4–1	6–0		3–2	2–0	0–0	0–0	4–0	3–1	2–1	3–3	3–0	1–1	1–0	1–3
Great Yarmouth Town	8–0	2–0	2–1	4–2	3–1	3–0	1–2		0–0	1–0	0–1	2–0	6–0	7–1	0–5	3–2	0–1	1–1	1–1
Halstead Town	2–0	0–1	4–0	2–1	3–1	3–0	1–0	4–2		1–2	4–2	0–1	2–1	5–0	2–4	4–1	5–1	0–2	1–2
Haverhill Borough	2–0	2–0	3–0	1–1	1–0	4–1	2–3	3–3	3–1		2–1	2–1	5–1	0–1	0–4	4–1	3–2	2–0	0–2
Ipswich Wanderers	5–1	1–0	2–2	3–0	1–0	12–1	0–0	1–4	0–0	3–2		4–1	5–0	3–0	0–3	2–1	2–3	1–2	3–0
Long Melford	4–0	1–3	2–1	1–3	1–3	3–1	0–2	1–1	2–4	1–2	1–2		2–1	3–2	4–1	2–0	0–3	1–1	0–3
March Town United	2–1	1–3	0–2	1–1	0–0	2–0	0–3	0–4	2–2	0–2	1–2	1–2		3–1	1–2	0–7	0–2	0–1	1–5
Needham Market reserves	7–0	2–2	1–2	2–1	2–2	2–1	1–0	0–1	1–4	0–2	0–6	1–2	4–1		1–0	0–1	2–1	1–2	0–5
Saffron Walden Town	1–1	6–2	3–1	2–2	1–0	8–0	4–3	2–2	0–0	0–1	1–1	2–1	5–1	6–3		6–0	3–0	1–1	2–2
Stowmarket Town	2–1	2–5	2–0	1–2	3–2	0–1	0–3	1–0	0–6	1–2	0–6	1–2	1–1	6–2	3–1		2–4	1–2	2–1
Swaffham Town	4–3	0–1	2–1	0–1	2–1	7–0	1–1	1–4	0–1	3–0	2–0	2–0	2–0	6–0	1–1	7–1		4–1	1–0
Team Bury	3–1	0–2	4–3	1–4	1–0	2–2	0–1	2–3	1–1	0–1	0–1	2–0	7–1	5–0	0–2	2–1	0–8		1–2
Whitton United	5–1	2–1	2–2	1–0	2–1	2–1	2–1	2–1	2–2	1–0	3–3	2–0	4–0	2–1	1–0	2–1	2–2	2–1	

Source: Mitoo
Legend: Blue = home team win; Yellow = draw; Red = away team win.
