= 2014–15 FA Cup qualifying rounds =

Tournament details
- Country: England; Guernsey; Wales

The 2014–15 FA Cup qualifying rounds opened the 134th season of competition in England for 'The Football Association Challenge Cup' (FA Cup), the world's oldest association football single knockout competition. A total of 736 clubs were accepted for the competition, down 1 from the previous season's 737.

The large number of clubs entering the tournament from lower down (Levels 5 through 10) in the English football pyramid meant that the competition started with six rounds of preliminary (2) and qualifying (4) knockouts for these non-League teams. The 32 winning teams from fourth qualifying round progressed to the First round proper, where League teams tiered at Levels 3 and 4 entered the competition.

== Calendar and prizes ==
The calendar for the 2014–15 FA Cup qualifying rounds, as announced by The Football Association.

Round	Main date	Leagues entering at this round	New entries this round	Winners from previous round	Number of fixtures	Prize money
Extra preliminary round	16 August 2014	Levels 9-10	368	none	184	£1,500
Preliminary round	30 August 2014	Level 8	136	184	160	£1,925
First qualifying round	13 September 2014	Level 7	72	160	116	£3,000
Second qualifying round	27 September 2014	Conference North; Conference South	44	116	80	£4,500
Third qualifying round	11 October 2014	none	none	80	40	£7,500
Fourth qualifying round	25 October 2014	Conference Premier	24	40	32	£12,500
For the next rounds look 2014–15 FA Cup

== Extra preliminary round ==
Extra preliminary round fixtures were due to be played on 16 August 2014, with replays taking place no later than 21 August 2014. A total of 368 teams, from Level 9 and Level 10 of English football, entered at this stage of the competition.

Tie	Home team (tier)	Score	Away team (tier)	Att.
1	Whickham (10)	5–0	Bacup & Rossendale Borough (9)	95
2	Guisborough Town (9)	1–1	Armthorpe Welfare (9)	128
replay	Armthorpe Welfare (9)	2–2 (3–2 p)	Guisborough Town (9)	72
3	Seaham Red Star (10)	2–1	Liversedge (9)	71
4	Jarrow Roofing BCA (9)	4–1	Eccleshill United (10)	68
5	Bridlington Town (9)	1–1	Whitley Bay (9)	201
replay	Whitley Bay (9)	0–1	Bridlington Town (9)	323
6	North Shields (9)	1–0	Pontefract Collieries (10)	230
7	Silsden (9)	0–2	Consett (9)	137
8	Shildon (9)	7–0	Crook Town (9)	
9	Billingham Synthonia (9)	1–2	Durham City (9)	98
10	Thackley (9)	1–2	Albion Sports (9)	287
11	Holker Old Boys (10)	2–2	Ashington (9)	95
replay	Ashington (9)	3–0	Holker Old Boys (10)	212
12	Northallerton Town (10)	3–0	Colne (9)	136
13	Hebburn Town (10)	2–2	West Allotment Celtic (9)	164
replay	West Allotment Celtic (9)	2–0	Hebburn Town (10)	98
14	Glasshoughton Welfare (9)	1–2	Knaresborough Town (10)	
15	Pickering Town (9)	0–6	Washington (10)	173
16	Newton Aycliffe (9)	1–2	Garforth Town (9)	136
17	Bishop Auckland (9)	1–1	Sunderland RCA (9)	293
replay	Sunderland RCA (9)	0–2	Bishop Auckland (9)	143
18	Nelson (9)	1–2	West Auckland Town (9)	168
19	Newcastle Benfield (9)	2–1	Penrith (9)	55
20	Marske United (9)	7–1	Billingham Town (10)	192
21	Tadcaster Albion (9)	5–0	Barnoldswick Town (9)	107
22	Morpeth Town (9)	0–2	Dunston UTS (9)	110
23	Cammell Laird 1907 (10)	W.O.	West Didsbury & Chorlton (9)	
Walkover for West Didsbury & Chorlton as Cammell Laird were expelled.
24	Nostell Miners Welfare (9)	1–2	Stockport Sports (9)	45
25	Parkgate (9)	1–3	Congleton Town (9)	57
26	1874 Northwich (9)	2–1	Maine Road (9)	363
27	Glossop North End (9)	3–0	AFC Blackpool (9)	212
28	St Helens Town (9)	2–5	Atherton Collieries (10)	113
29	Rochdale Town (10)	0–6	Runcorn Linnets (9)	253
30	Bootle (9)	0–1	Runcorn Town (9)	126
31	AFC Liverpool (9)	0–3	Squires Gate (9)	127
32	Barton Town Old Boys (9)	7–0	Abbey Hey (9)	90
33	AFC Emley (10)	2–1	Ashton Athletic (9)	165
34	Alsager Town (9)	2–3	Winterton Rangers (10)	68
35	Wigan Robin Park (10)	1–2	Maltby Main (9)	32
36	Winsford United (9)	0–1	Athersley Recreation (9)	107
37	Rocester (9)	1–1	Stafford Town (10)	64
replay	Stafford Town (10)	2–1	Rocester (9)	87
38	Walsall Wood (9)	1–0	Heath Hayes (9)	102
39	Blaby & Whetstone Athletic (10)	2–2	Harborough Town (9)	57
replay	Harborough Town (9)	1–6	Blaby & Whetstone Athletic (10)	84
40	Heather St John's (10)	0–2	Coventry Sphinx (9)	71
41	Kirby Muxloe (9)	3–0	Wolverhampton Casuals (10)	41
42	Stourport Swifts (9)	2–0	Lye Town (9)	117
43	Causeway United (9)	4–1	Cradley Town (10)	59
44	Bolehall Swifts (10)	1–2	Dudley Town (10)	62
45	St Andrews (10)	2–2	Tipton Town (9)	104
replay	Tipton Town (9)	2–1	St Andrews (10)	75
46	Bromsgrove Sporting (10)	2–0	Bewdley Town (10)	328
47	Boldmere St. Michaels (9)	4–3	Desborough Town (9)	90
48	Shawbury United (10)	2–0	Continental Star (9)	46
49	Ellistown & Ibstock United (10)	2–0	Studley (10)	60
50	Black Country Rangers (10)	1–3	Lichfield City (10)	
51	AFC Wulfrunians (9)	3–2	Alvechurch (9)	
52	Coleshill Town (9)	10–0	Nuneaton Griff (10)	92
53	Sporting Khalsa (10)	0–0	Pegasus Juniors (10)	32
replay	Pegasus Juniors (10)	1–2	Sporting Khalsa (10)	49
54	Wellington (Herefords) (10)	2–1	Ellesmere Rangers (10)	55
55	Atherstone Town (10)	1–1	Brocton (9)	
replay	Brocton (9)	2–1	Atherstone Town (10)	95
56	Gornal Athletic (10)	1–2	Westfields (9)	37
57	Heanor Town (9)	1–0	Long Eaton United (9)	368
58	Shirebrook Town (10)	2–2	Loughborough University (9)	
replay	Loughborough University (9)	2–1	Shirebrook Town (10)	46
59	Quorn (9)	3–1	Bottesford Town (10)	
60	Cleethorpes Town (9)	4–1	Borrowash Victoria (10)	61
61	Shepshed Dynamo (9)	1–1	Dunkirk F.C. (9)	119
replay	Dunkirk F.C. (9)	2–2 (0–3 p)	Shepshed Dynamo (9)	97
62	Clipstone (10)	2–0	Harrowby United (9)	82
63	Holwell Sports (10)	3–0	Graham Street Prims (10)	
64	Thurnby Nirvana (9)	5–1	Lincoln Moorlands Railway (10)	45
65	Arnold Town (10)	1–4	Basford United (9)	110
66	Retford United (9)	2–2	Stapenhill (10)	98
replay	Stapenhill (10)	1–3	Retford United (9)	111
67	Handsworth Parramore (9)	5–1	Oadby Town (9)	102
68	Staveley Miners Welfare (9)	2–0	Worksop Town (9)	371
69	Peterborough Northern Star (9)	3–0	Team Bury (10)	
70	Mildenhall Town (9)	3–0	Gorleston (9)	91
71	Kirkley & Pakefield (9)	3–0	Ely City (9)	68
72	Boston Town (9)	1–1	Walsham-le-Willows (9)	
replay	Walsham-le-Willows (9)	1–3	Boston Town (9)	86
73	Norwich United (9)	1–0	Deeping Rangers (9)	76
74	Great Yarmouth Town (10)	1–0	Huntingdon Town (9)	
75	Sleaford Town (9)	1–3	Wisbech Town (9)	
76	Thetford Town (9)	1–0	Swaffham Town (10)	120
77	Newmarket Town (9)	1–1	Fakenham Town (9)	87
replay	Fakenham Town (9)	0–1	Newmarket Town (9)	84
78	Yaxley (9)	0–3	Godmanchester Rovers (9)	115
79	Diss Town (9)	1–5	Holbeach United (9)	108
80	Clapton (9)	1–1	Bowers & Pitsea (9)	
replay	Bowers & Pitsea (9)	3–3 (4–3 p)	Clapton (9)	103
81	Colney Heath (9)	3–2	Southend Manor (9)	96
82	Halstead Town (10)	0–0	St. Margaretsbury (9)	141
replay	St. Margaretsbury (9)	6–2	Halstead Town (10)	78
Original match abandoned after 45 minutes due to floodlight failure. Score was at 0–1.
83	Brantham Athletic (9)	1–1	Codicote (10)	
replay	Codicote (10)	5–0	Brantham Athletic (9)	42
84	F.C. Romania (9)	0–0	Haverhill Rovers (9)	
replay	Haverhill Rovers (9)	0–3	F.C. Romania (9)	99
85	Stansted (9)	0–2	Ipswich Wanderers (9)	137
86	Takeley (9)	2–2	London Tigers (9)	133
replay	London Tigers (9)	4–0	Takeley (9)	
87	Whitton United (9)	2–0	Eton Manor (9)	56
88	London Colney (9)	6–0	Woodbridge Town (10)	
89	Wivenhoe Town (9)	3–0	Enfield 1893 (9)	

Tie	Home team (tier)	Score	Away team (tier)	Att.
90	Sporting Bengal United (9)	1–2	Clacton (9)	75
91	Waltham Forest (9)	1–2	Hoddesdon Town (9)	
92	Ilford (9)	1–2	Saffron Walden Town (10)	92
93	Tower Hamlets (9)	0–1	Felixstowe & Walton United (9)	85
94	Haverhill Borough (10)	1–0	Barking (9)	105
95	Basildon United (9)	3–2	Stanway Rovers (9)	61
96	Hadleigh United (9)	3–2	Sawbridgeworth Town (9)	70
97	Cockfosters (9)	5–4	Hullbridge Sports (9)	
98	Haringey Borough (9)	0–3	Hertford Town (9)	
99	Welwyn Garden City (10)	1–1	Hadley (9)	103
replay	Hadley (9)	1–2	Welwyn Garden City (10)	105
100	Hatfield Town (10)	0–3	Baldock Town (10)	70
101	Northampton Sileby Rangers (9)	3–0	Hillingdon Borough (9)	31
102	Tring Athletic (9)	3–4	Holmer Green (9)	93
103	Staines Lammas (10)	3–2	Bedfont Sports (9)	155
104	Harefield United (9)	2–1	Crawley Green (10)	70
105	Cogenhoe United (9)	1–1	Wembley (9)	65
replay	Wembley (9)	1–3	Cogenhoe United (9)	54
106	Northampton Spencer (10)	0–2	AFC Kempston Rovers (9)	63
107	Ashford Town (9)	3–1	Berkhamsted (9)	
108	Wellingborough Town (9)	2–4	Bedfont & Feltham (10)	
109	Long Buckby (9)	1–1	Hanworth Villa (9)	
replay	Hanworth Villa (9)	4–0	Long Buckby (9)	
110	AFC Dunstable (9)	2–0	Ampthill Town (9)	132
111	Bedford (10)	2–3	Kings Langley (9)	29
112	AFC Rushden & Diamonds (9)	5–1	Oxhey Jets (9)	495
113	Stotfold (9)	1–3	Biggleswade United (9)	83
114	Leverstock Green (9)	2–1	Newport Pagnell Town (9)	33
115	Hartley Wintney (9)	2–1	Frimley Green (9)	
Original match abandoned after 45 minutes due to misconduct. Score was at 1–2.
116	Kidlington (9)	3–0	Newbury (9)	61
117	Cove (9)	0–1	Thame United (9)	
118	Fairford Town (10)	1–3	Knaphill (9)	
119	Brimscombe & Thrupp (9)	1–2	Windsor (9)	97
120	Ardley United (9)	5–1	Ash United (10)	
121	Holyport (9)	2–2	Abingdon United (9)	90
replay	Abingdon United (9)	4–0	Holyport (9)	
122	Slimbridge (9)	1–1	Thatcham Town (9)	74
replay	Thatcham Town (9)	1–2	Slimbridge (9)	70
123	Reading Town (9)	0–1	Shrivenham (9)	46
124	Cheltenham Saracens (9)	1–0	Camberley Town (9)	70
125	Flackwell Heath (9)	4–0	Bracknell Town (9)	77
126	Chertsey Town (9)	1–1	Milton United (9)	
replay	Milton United (9)	1–1 (4–1 p)	Chertsey Town (9)	68
127	Ascot United (9)	1–1	Tadley Calleva (10)	90
replay	Tadley Calleva (10)	2–4	Ascot United (9)	130
128	Badshot Lea (9)	3–0	Binfield (9)	
129	Farnham Town (9)	1–4	Highmoor Ibis (9)	
130	Pagham (9)	2–0	Woodstock Sports (9)	
131	Erith Town (9)	1–2	St Francis Rangers (9)	58
132	Horsham YMCA (9)	3–2	Alton Town (10)	77
133	Sevenoaks Town (9)	1–2	East Preston (9)	84
134	Ringmer (9)	2–1	Corinthian (9)	50
135	Guildford City (9)	0–2	Ashford United (9)	112
136	Chichester City (9)	2–3	Mole Valley SCR (9)	
137	Deal Town (9)	2–2	Phoenix Sports (9)	134
replay	Phoenix Sports (9)	3–3 (7–8 p)	Deal Town (9)	171
138	Molesey (9)	11–0	Haywards Heath Town (10)	57
139	Westfield (Surrey) (9)	3–2	Horley Town (9)	50
140	Dorking Wanderers (9)	0–0	Crowborough Athletic (9)	
replay	Crowborough Athletic (9)	0–7	Dorking Wanderers (9)	72
141	Colliers Wood United (9)	0–1	Lordswood (9)	32
142	Holmesdale (9)	4–1	Tunbridge Wells (9)	97
143	Chessington & Hook United (10)	1–0	Worthing United (10)	
144	Canterbury City (9)	2–1	Lingfield (9)	
145	Greenwich Borough (9)	2–1	Lancing (9)	85
146	Arundel (9)	0–1	Croydon (9)	70
147	Shoreham (9)	1–1	Crawley Down Gatwick (9)	
replay	Crawley Down Gatwick (9)	1–3	Shoreham (9)	132
148	Epsom Athletic (10)	2–5	Littlehampton Town (9)	
149	Eastbourne United (9)	5–2	Hailsham Town (9)	
150	Erith & Belvedere (9)	2–0	AFC Croydon Athletic (10)	158
151	Hassocks (9)	1–3	Epsom & Ewell (9)	84
152	Beckenham Town (9)	1–3	Eastbourne Town (9)	70
153	Selsey (9)	0–3	Fisher (9)	
154	Cray Valley Paper Mills (9)	1–3	Raynes Park Vale (9)	106
155	Newport (Isle of Wight) (9)	2–0	Hamworthy United (9)	
156	Whitchurch United (9)	1–1	Hallen (9)	48
replay	Hallen (9)	2–1	Whitchurch United (9)	42
157	Winterbourne United (9)	3–2	Hythe & Dibden (10)	
158	Bemerton Heath Harlequins (9)	1–0	Totton & Eling (9)	50
159	Bridport (9)	2–3	Highworth Town (9)	
160	Longwell Green Sports (9)	1–1	Melksham Town (9)	92
replay	Melksham Town (9)	0–1	Longwell Green Sports (9)	109
161	Bitton (9)	1–2	Blackfield & Langley (9)	94
162	Pewsey Vale (10)	0–1	Sherborne Town (9)	78
163	Folland Sports (9)	4–1	Downton (10)	48
164	Alresford Town (9)	1–1	Christchurch (9)	57
replay	Christchurch (9)	1–3	Alresford Town (9)	72
165	Bournemouth (9)	4–2	Verwood Town (9)	55
166	AFC Portchester (9)	2–1	Fawley (9)	50
167	Cadbury Heath (9)	3–4	Cribbs (10)	74
168	Brockenhurst (9)	0–3	Wootton Bassett Town (9)	
169	Bradford Town (9)	4–3	Moneyfields (9)	60
170	Gillingham Town (9)	4–1	Almondsbury UWE (10)	109
171	Corsham Town (10)	2–3	Horndean (9)	52
172	Petersfield Town (9)	2–3	Bristol Manor Farm (9)	62
173	Romsey Town (10)	1–3	Fareham Town (9)	201
174	Lymington Town (9)	2–5	Winchester City (9)	59
175	Cowes Sports (10)	1–0	Team Solent (10)	
176	Hengrove Athletic (10)	0–1	Bodmin Town (10)	35
177	Barnstaple Town (10)	0–1	Witheridge (10)	192
178	Saltash United (10)	2–1	Welton Rovers (10)	99
179	St Austell (10)	5–0	Bishop Sutton (9)	151
180	Willand Rovers (9)	3–1	Radstock Town (10)	87
181	Brislington (9)	2–2	Street (9)	48
replay	Street (9)	1–2 (a.e.t.)	Brislington (9)	63
182	Shepton Mallet (9)	W.O.	Ilfracombe Town (10)	N/A
Walkover for Shepton Mallet as Ilfracombe withdrew.
183	Torpoint Athletic (10)	2–4	Odd Down (9)	85
184	Plymouth Parkway (10)	4–1	Buckland Athletic (9)	

== Preliminary round ==
Preliminary round fixtures were due to be played on 30 August 2014, with replays no later than 5 September. A total of 320 teams took part in this stage of the competition, including the 184 winners from the Extra preliminary round and 136 entering at this stage from the six leagues at Level 8 of English football. The round included 34 teams from Level 10 still in the competition, being the lowest ranked teams in this round.

Tie	Home team (tier)	Score	Away team (tier)	Att.
1	Newcastle Benfield (9)	0–0	Kendal Town (8)	97
replay	Kendal Town (8)	0–4	Newcastle Benfield (9)	125
2	Dunston UTS (9)	3–0	Durham City (9)	192
3	West Auckland Town (9)	1–1	Darlington 1883 (8)	1,238
replay	Darlington 1883 (8)	3–1	West Auckland Town (9)	932
4	Garforth Town (9)	1–2	Harrogate Railway Athletic (8)	120
5	Knaresborough Town (10)	0–1	West Allotment Celtic (9)	268
6	Tadcaster Albion (9)	0–2	Spennymoor Town (8)	237
7	Consett (9)	2–0	Whickham (10)	211
8	Bishop Auckland (9)	4–4	Jarrow Roofing BCA (9)	223
replay	Jarrow Roofing BCA (9)	3–4 (a.e.t.)	Bishop Auckland (9)	155
9	Albion Sports (9)	1–2	Ashington (9)	127
10	Washington (10)	0–7	Lancaster City (8)	103
11	Bridlington Town (9)	3–0	Northallerton Town (10)	203
12	Padiham (8)	0–1	Shildon (9)	160
13	Armthorpe Welfare (9)	1–4	Marske United (9)	146
14	Clitheroe (8)	3–2	Seaham Red Star (10)	176
15	Scarborough Athletic (8)	1–1	North Shields (9)	381
replay	North Shields (9)	4–4 (2–4 p)	Scarborough Athletic (8)	402
16	New Mills (8)	2–3	Squires Gate (9)	101
17	Stockport Sports (9)	1–5	Ossett Town (8)	32
18	Northwich Victoria (8)	4–0	AFC Emley (10)	105
19	Winterton Rangers (10)	0–3	Ossett Albion (8)	73
20	Farsley (8)	4–1	Athersley Recreation (9)	182
21	Stocksbridge Park Steels (8)	0–2	Bamber Bridge (8)	120
22	Warrington Town (8)	4–1	Barton Town Old Boys (9)	114
23	Runcorn Town (9)	1–1	Goole (8)	85
replay	Goole (8)	0–1	Runcorn Town (9)	143
24	West Didsbury & Chorlton (9)	0–3	Brighouse Town (8)	87
25	Burscough (8)	1–1	Mossley (8)	124
replay	Mossley (8)	1–2 (a.e.t.)	Burscough (8)	110
26	1874 Northwich (9)	3–3	Prescot Cables (8)	356
replay	Prescot Cables (8)	2–1	1874 Northwich (9)	291
27	Congleton Town (9)	0–0	Salford City (8)	286
replay	Salford City (8)	6–3 (a.e.t.)	Congleton Town (9)	237
28	Radcliffe Borough (8)	2–2	Atherton Collieries (10)	204
replay	Atherton Collieries (10)	2–2 (2–3 p)	Radcliffe Borough (8)	299
29	Droylsden (8)	4–0	Runcorn Linnets (9)	283
30	Maltby Main (9)	0–7	Glossop North End (9)	89
31	Sporting Khalsa (10)	0–1	Tipton Town (9)	107
32	Newcastle Town (8)	1–1	Chasetown (8)	132
replay	Chasetown (8)	2–1	Newcastle Town (8)	165
33	Walsall Wood (9)	0–3	Stafford Rangers (8)	277
34	AFC Wulfrunians (9)	1–2	Boldmere St. Michaels (9)	114
35	Shawbury United (10)	3–3	Tividale (8)	54
replay	Tividale (8)	5–2	Shawbury United (10)	66
36	Leek Town (8)	5–1	Lichfield City (10)	307
37	Sutton Coldfield Town (8)	3–3	Brocton (9)	101
replay	Brocton (9)	0–1 (a.e.t.)	Sutton Coldfield Town (8)	152
38	Coleshill Town (9)	2–2	Bromsgrove Sporting (10)	175
replay	Bromsgrove Sporting (10)	2–3 (a.e.t.)	Coleshill Town (9)	369
39	Dudley Town (10)	0–6	Market Drayton Town (8)	77
40	Stafford Town (10)	1–4	Norton United (8)	71
41	Westfields (9)	0–2	Rugby Town (8)	201
42	Coventry Sphinx (9)	0–0	Bedworth United (8)	334
replay	Bedworth United (8)	3–1 (a.e.t.)	Coventry Sphinx (9)	280
43	Blaby & Whetstone Athletic (10)	1–0	Stratford Town (8)	93
44	Evesham United (8)	3–1	Kidsgrove Athletic (8)	188
45	Wellington (Herefords) (10)	2–3	Stourport Swifts (9)	86
46	Romulus (8)	3–1	Causeway United (9)	75
47	Ellistown & Ibstock United (10)	1–0	Kirby Muxloe (9)	88
48	Lincoln United (8)	4–0	Brigg Town (8)	101
49	Rainworth Miners Welfare (8)	0–3	Staveley Miners Welfare (9)	103
50	Spalding United (8)	1–0	Heanor Town (9)	188
51	Basford United (9)	3–3	Sheffield (8)	143
replay	Sheffield (8)	2–1 (a.e.t.)	Basford United (9)	204
52	Mickleover Sports (8)	3–1	Thurnby Nirvana (9)	115
53	Gresley (8)	0–0	Cleethorpes Town (9)	253
replay	Cleethorpes Town (9)	5–4 (a.e.t.)	Gresley (8)	193
54	Clipstone (10)	2–1	Loughborough University (9)	72
55	Loughborough Dynamo (8)	0–2	Coalville Town (8)	188
56	Carlton Town (8)	2–1	Handsworth Parramore (9)	72
57	Shepshed Dynamo (9)	2–0	Quorn (9)	197
58	Retford United (9)	1–3	Holwell Sports (10)	117
59	Dereham Town (8)	2–2	St Ives Town (8)	203
replay	St Ives Town (8)	3–3 (0–3 p)	Dereham Town (8)	137
60	Needham Market (8)	1–0	Soham Town Rangers (8)	229
61	Peterborough Northern Star (9)	0–2	Mildenhall Town (9)	145
62	Godmanchester Rovers (9)	2–3	Newmarket Town (9)	154
63	Thetford Town (9)	0–3	Norwich United (9)	131
64	Holbeach United (9)	2–4	Boston Town (9)	160
65	Wisbech Town (9)	2–1	Kirkley & Pakefield (9)	228
66	Wroxham (8)	4–1	Great Yarmouth Town (10)	149
67	Royston Town (8)	2–3	Brightlingsea Regent (8)	112
68	Cheshunt (8)	0–1	Thurrock (8)	135
69	Baldock Town (10)	0–3	Harlow Town (8)	213
70	Barkingside (8)	5–0	Wivenhoe Town (9)	45
71	Brentwood Town (8)	1–0	Potters Bar Town (8)	112
72	Ware (8)	0–3	Felixstowe & Walton United (9)	81
73	London Tigers (9)	2–0	Clacton (9)	27
74	Ipswich Wanderers (9)	2–1	Hoddesdon Town (9)	126
75	Burnham Ramblers (8)	1–3	Hadleigh United (9)	74
76	Redbridge (8)	1–1	AFC Sudbury (8)	61
replay	AFC Sudbury (8)	3–2	Redbridge (8)	122
77	F.C. Romania (9)	2–1	Heybridge Swifts (8)	131
78	Maldon & Tiptree (8)	1–2	London Colney (9)	75
79	Aveley (8)	2–0	Basildon United (9)	67
80	Codicote (10)	1–1	Tilbury (8)	42
replay	Tilbury (8)	2–0	Codicote (10)	74

Tie	Home team (tier)	Score	Away team (tier)	Att.
81	Bowers & Pitsea (9)	1–0	Colney Heath (9)	83
82	Whitton United (9)	0–2	Haverhill Borough (10)	103
83	Waltham Abbey (8)	6–3	Cockfosters (9)	87
84	Hertford Town (9)	3–2	Great Wakering Rovers (8)	188
85	St. Margaretsbury (9)	0–4	Romford (8)	76
86	Saffron Walden Town (10)	1–1	Welwyn Garden City (10)	607
replay	Welwyn Garden City (10)	1–0 (a.e.t.)	Saffron Walden Town (10)	289
87	Harefield United (9)	1–2	Leverstock Green (9)	80
88	AFC Rushden & Diamonds (9)	1–1	Bedford Town (8)	754
replay	Bedford Town (8)	0–3	AFC Rushden & Diamonds (9)	552
89	Hanworth Villa (9)	1–1	North Greenford United (8)	79
replay	North Greenford United (8)	2–1	Hanworth Villa (9)	62
90	Staines Lammas (10)	1–8	Barton Rovers (8)	94
91	Northwood (8)	1–1	Kings Langley (9)	94
replay	Kings Langley (9)	1–3 (a.e.t.)	Northwood (8)	120
92	Aylesbury United (8)	2–3	Aylesbury (8)	268
93	AFC Kempston Rovers (9)	4–0	Northampton Sileby Rangers (9)	82
Walkover for Northampton Sileby Rangers as Kempston Rovers fielded an ineligible player.
94	Cogenhoe United (9)	1–4	Kettering Town (8)	397
95	Bedfont & Feltham (10)	3–2	Leighton Town (8)	76
96	AFC Hayes (8)	1–1	Holmer Green (9)	82
replay	Holmer Green (9)	0–4	AFC Hayes (8)	144
97	AFC Dunstable (9)	2–3	Uxbridge (8)	99
98	Hanwell Town (8)	1–2	Biggleswade United (9)	135
99	Ashford Town (9)	1–1	Daventry Town (8)	100
replay	Daventry Town (8)	2–1	Ashford Town (9)	128
100	Knaphill (9)	2–1	Badshot Lea (9)	70
101	Milton United (9)	2–1	Marlow (8)	82
102	Shrivenham (9)	1–6	Shortwood United (8)	143
103	Thame United (9)	3–2	Highmoor Ibis (9)	78
104	North Leigh (8)	1–2	Flackwell Heath (9)	83
105	Beaconsfield SYCOB (8)	5–1	Didcot Town (8)	148
106	Ardley United (9)	1–1	Hartley Wintney (9)	
replay	Hartley Wintney (9)	0–0 (4–5 p)	Ardley United (9)	
107	Windsor (9)	0–2	Godalming Town (8)	239
108	Slimbridge (9)	0–1	Chalfont St Peter (8)	61
109	Wantage Town (8)	3–2	Kidlington (9)	170
110	Cheltenham Saracens (9)	1–3	Fleet Town (8)	61
111	Bishop's Cleeve (8)	1–0	Ascot United (9)	92
112	Abingdon United (9)	1–0	Egham Town (8)	112
113	Chatham Town (8)	1–2	Whyteleafe (8)	137
114	Greenwich Borough (9)	5–2	St Francis Rangers (9)	147
115	Lordswood (9)	2–2	Hythe Town (8)	107
replay	Hythe Town (8)	2–0	Lordswood (9)	194
116	Faversham Town (8)	2–1	Westfield (Surrey) (9)	139
117	Worthing (8)	2–0	Guernsey (8)	248
118	Cray Wanderers (8)	3–1	Molesey (9)	87
119	East Preston (9)	2–1	Holmesdale (9)	75
120	Burgess Hill Town (8)	1–0	Eastbourne Town (9)	204
121	Ashford United (9)	0–1	Chipstead (8)	219
122	Redhill (8)	0–0	Horsham YMCA (9)	97
replay	Horsham YMCA (9)	0–2	Redhill (8)	99
123	Epsom & Ewell (9)	1–1	Croydon (9)	82
replay	Croydon (9)	4–1	Epsom & Ewell (9)	101
124	Mole Valley SCR (9)	1–5	Carshalton Athletic (8)	83
125	Sittingbourne (8)	0–3	Dorking Wanderers (9)	112
126	Walton & Hersham (8)	1–2	Herne Bay (8)	80
127	Littlehampton Town (9)	4–2	Shoreham (9)	193
128	Eastbourne United (9)	2–3	Hastings United (8)	258
129	Deal Town (9)	1–1	Chessington & Hook United (10)	105
replay	Chessington & Hook United (10)	2–1	Deal Town (9)	183
130	Walton Casuals (8)	1–1	Whitstable Town (8)	103
replay	Whitstable Town (8)	3–1	Walton Casuals (8)	157
131	Tooting & Mitcham United (8)	0–0	Three Bridges (8)	209
replay	Three Bridges (8)	1–4	Tooting & Mitcham United (8)	114
132	Erith & Belvedere (9)	2–2	Folkestone Invicta (8)	183
replay	Folkestone Invicta (8)	3–1 (a.e.t.)	Erith & Belvedere (9)	194
133	Fisher (9)	2–4	Ramsgate (8)	136
134	East Grinstead Town (8)	2–2	Raynes Park Vale (9)	111
replay	Raynes Park Vale (9)	2–1 (a.e.t.)	East Grinstead Town (8)	85
135	South Park (8)	2–1	Thamesmead Town (8)	104
136	Ringmer (9)	0–4	Merstham (8)	65
137	Canterbury City (9)	0–2	Pagham (9)	
138	Horsham (8)	1–0	Corinthian-Casuals (8)	224
139	Bashley (8)	0–2	Winchester City (9)	160
140	Alresford Town (9)	2–2	Sherborne Town (9)	80
replay	Sherborne Town (9)	4–0	Alresford Town (9)	110
141	Cowes Sports (10)	0–1	Yate Town (8)	116
142	Fareham Town (9)	0–3	Longwell Green Sports (9)	
143	Cinderford Town (8)	1–2	Horndean (9)	
144	Swindon Supermarine (8)	1–0	Hallen (9)	92
145	Bradford Town (9)	2–1	Wootton Bassett Town (9)	107
146	AFC Totton (8)	2–0	Gillingham Town (9)	280
147	Sholing (8)	3–1	Bristol Manor Farm (9)	128
148	Newport (Isle of Wight) (9)	5–2	Winterbourne United (9)	187
149	Bemerton Heath Harlequins (9)	0–0	Bournemouth (9)	61
replay	Bournemouth (9)	2–3	Bemerton Heath Harlequins (9)	64
150	Mangotsfield United (8)	4–1	Cribbs (10)	160
151	Blackfield & Langley (9)	4–0	Highworth Town (9)	62
152	AFC Portchester (9)	1–4	Folland Sports (9)	
153	Taunton Town (8)	4–1	Clevedon Town (8)	231
154	Merthyr Town (8)	0–1	Larkhall Athletic (8)	351
155	Bodmin Town (10)	4–1	Witheridge (10)	101
156	Tiverton Town (8)	1–0	Plymouth Parkway (10)	222
157	Odd Down (9)	0–2	Willand Rovers (9)	55
158	Wimborne Town (8)	3–2	St Austell (10)	194
159	Shepton Mallet (9)	0–0	Saltash United (10)	99
replay	Saltash United (10)	1–0	Shepton Mallet (9)	116
160	Bridgwater Town (8)	1–0	Brislington (9)	153

== First qualifying round ==
First qualifying round fixtures were due to be played on 13 September 2014, with replays no later than 18 September. A total of 232 teams took part in this stage of the competition, including the 160 winners from the Preliminary round and 72 entering at this stage from the three leagues at Level 7 of English football. There were 10 teams from Level 10 still in the competition, being the lowest ranked teams in this round.

Tie	Home team (tier)	Score	Away team (tier)	Att.
1	Marske United (9)	2–2	Dunston UTS (9)	281
replay	Dunston UTS (9)	2–0	Marske United (9)	368
2	West Allotment Celtic (9)	0–5	Lancaster City (8)	141
3	Darlington 1883 (8)	0–0	Blyth Spartans (7)	1,051
replay	Blyth Spartans (7)	3–0	Darlington 1883 (8)	652
4	Newcastle Benfield (9)	3–1	Bridlington Town (9)	125
5	Ashington (9)	2–2	Scarborough Athletic (8)	498
replay	Scarborough Athletic (8)	1–0	Ashington (9)	256
6	Shildon (9)	1–1	Whitby Town (7)	290
replay	Whitby Town (7)	1–2	Shildon (9)	266
7	Workington (7)	2–0	Consett (9)	385
8	Harrogate Railway Athletic (8)	3–1	Clitheroe (8)	116
9	Bishop Auckland (9)	2–3	Spennymoor Town (8)	643
10	Ossett Albion (8)	0–4	Droylsden (8)	116
11	Salford City (8)	2–0	Nantwich Town (7)	369
12	Brighouse Town (8)	1–2	Ashton United (7)	186
13	Northwich Victoria (8)	0–0	Glossop North End (9)	142
replay	Glossop North End (9)	2–2 (4–2 p)	Northwich Victoria (8)	250
14	FC United Of Manchester (7)	4–1	Prescot Cables (8)	1,001
15	Buxton (7)	3–2	Ramsbottom United (7)	261
16	Bamber Bridge (8)	2–2	Squires Gate (9)	264
replay	Squires Gate (9)	2–3 (a.e.t.)	Bamber Bridge (8)	155
17	Farsley (8)	2–1	Frickley Athletic (7)	178
18	Runcorn Town (9)	5–3	Witton Albion (7)	230
19	Marine (7)	2–1	Ossett Town (8)	206
20	Burscough (8)	0–1	Curzon Ashton (7)	122
21	Skelmersdale United (7)	4–3	Radcliffe Borough (8)	194
22	Warrington Town (8)	1–0	Trafford (7)	127
23	Rugby Town (8)	1–1	Chasetown (8)	256
replay	Chasetown (8)	1–3	Rugby Town (8)	213
24	Evesham United (8)	0–0	Redditch United (7)	309
replay	Redditch United (7)	0–1	Evesham United (8)	279
25	Market Drayton Town (8)	1–3	Stourbridge (7)	211
26	Boldmere St. Michaels (9)	0–3	Bedworth United (8)	221
27	Halesowen Town (7)	3–0	Sutton Coldfield Town (8)	321
28	Coleshill Town (9)	1–2	Barwell (7)	211
29	Blaby & Whetstone Athletic (10)	4–1	Tipton Town (9)	87
30	Rushall Olympic (7)	3–2	Romulus (8)	137
31	Ellistown & Ibstock United (10)	3–2	Hereford United (7)	200
32	Stafford Rangers (8)	0–0	Tividale (8)	437
replay	Tividale (8)	4–0	Stafford Rangers (8)	227
33	Corby Town (7)	3–3	Norton United (8)	332
replay	Norton United (8)	2–1	Corby Town (7)	123
34	Leek Town (8)	2–1	Stourport Swifts (9)	205
35	Lincoln United (8)	2–3	Stamford (7)	151
36	Mickleover Sports (8)	3–0	Staveley Miners Welfare (9)	138
37	Matlock Town (7)	1–2	Ilkeston (7)	417
38	Sheffield (8)	3–2	Shepshed Dynamo (9)	238
39	Spalding United (8)	4–0	Holwell Sports (10)	176
40	Belper Town (7)	3–3	Coalville Town (8)	223
replay	Coalville Town (8)	2–0	Belper Town (7)	182
41	Cleethorpes Town (9)	3–2	Carlton Town (8)	122
42	Grantham Town (7)	4–1	Clipstone (10)	226
43	Mildenhall Town (9)	1–3	Wroxham (8)	138
44	St Neots Town (7)	1–1	Dereham Town (8)	312
replay	Dereham Town (8)	1–1 (4–2 p)	St Neots Town (7)	267
45	Newmarket Town (9)	0–3	Histon (7)	263
46	King's Lynn Town (7)	7–0	Boston Town (9)	548
47	Cambridge City (7)	2–4	Needham Market (8)	245
48	Norwich United (9)	1–0	Wisbech Town (9)	172
49	Romford (8)	1–0	Bury Town (7)	153
50	Billericay Town (7)	4–0	Hadleigh United (9)	243
51	Hertford Town (9)	1–4	Canvey Island (7)	235
52	Haverhill Borough (10)	0–2	Leiston (7)	158
53	Tilbury (8)	0–4	Aveley (8)	107
54	AFC Hornchurch (7)	1–1	East Thurrock United (7)	221
replay	East Thurrock United (7)	2–2 (4–3 p)	AFC Hornchurch (7)	204
55	London Tigers (9)	1–0	Brightlingsea Regent (8)	58
56	Waltham Abbey (8)	3–1	Barkingside (8)	68
57	AFC Sudbury (8)	1–3	F.C. Romania (9)	290
58	Bowers & Pitsea (9)	0–4	Witham Town (7)	113

Tie	Home team (tier)	Score	Away team (tier)	Att.
59	Brentwood Town (8)	1–0	London Colney (9)	123
60	Wingate & Finchley (7)	2–2	Ipswich Wanderers (9)	124
replay	Ipswich Wanderers (9)	3–4	Wingate & Finchley (7)	189
61	Thurrock (8)	2–0	Welwyn Garden City (10)	148
62	Grays Athletic (7)	2–2	Harlow Town (8)	184
replay	Harlow Town (8)	2–4	Grays Athletic (7)	248
63	Enfield Town (7)	5–0	Felixstowe & Walton United (9)	286
64	Barton Rovers (8)	1–1	Northwood (8)	111
replay	Northwood (8)	2–3	Barton Rovers (8)	113
65	Aylesbury (8)	1–2	Kettering Town (8)	342
66	Bedfont & Feltham (10)	0–6	Uxbridge (8)	96
67	Biggleswade United (9)	1–2	Leverstock Green (9)	68
68	AFC Hayes (8)	2–3	Harrow Borough (7)	87
69	Hitchin Town (7)	2–1	Daventry Town (8)	222
70	Northampton Sileby Rangers (9)	1–3	North Greenford United (8)	51
71	Biggleswade Town (7)	2–1	Arlesey Town (7)	158
72	Dunstable Town (7)	2–2	Chesham United (7)	159
replay	Chesham United (7)	1–2	Dunstable Town (7)	208
73	Hendon (7)	1–0	AFC Rushden & Diamonds (9)	424
74	Abingdon United (9)	3–0	Milton United (9)	193
75	Flackwell Heath (9)	3–3	Wantage Town (8)	129
replay	Wantage Town (8)	1–2 (a.e.t.)	Flackwell Heath (9)	67
76	Shortwood United (8)	1–1	Cirencester Town (7)	150
replay	Cirencester Town (7)	0–1 (a.e.t.)	Shortwood United (8)	148
77	Knaphill (9)	1–2	Fleet Town (8)	129
78	Chalfont St Peter (8)	2–1	Hungerford Town (7)	95
79	Bishop's Cleeve (8)	0–1	Banbury United (7)	181
80	Slough Town (7)	1–2	Ardley United (9)	230
81	Thame United (9)	1–2	Burnham (7)	143
82	Godalming Town (8)	0–0	Beaconsfield SYCOB (8)	148
replay	Beaconsfield SYCOB (8)	2–1	Godalming Town (8)	107
83	Leatherhead (7)	1–2	Faversham Town (8)	207
84	Hythe Town (8)	4–0	Whitstable Town (8)	248
85	Ramsgate (8)	1–2	Raynes Park Vale (9)	158
86	Horsham (8)	0–4	Kingstonian (7)	304
87	Peacehaven & Telscombe (7)	0–0	East Preston (9)	141
replay	East Preston (9)	2–0	Peacehaven & Telscombe (7)	102
88	Redhill (8)	1–0	Carshalton Athletic (8)	100
89	Dorking Wanderers (9)	4–2	Pagham (9)	68
90	South Park (8)	2–2	Metropolitan Police (7)	102
replay	Metropolitan Police (7)	3–0	South Park (8)	70
91	Dulwich Hamlet (7)	0–3	Worthing (8)	489
92	Whyteleafe (8)	1–2	Hastings United (8)	164
93	Folkestone Invicta (8)	0–0	Margate (7)	565
replay	Margate (7)	3–1	Folkestone Invicta (8)	572
94	Tonbridge Angels (7)	6–0	Herne Bay (8)	376
95	Croydon (9)	2–3	Burgess Hill Town (8)	105
96	Greenwich Borough (9)	1–0	Chessington & Hook United (10)	119
97	Cray Wanderers (8)	1–2	Tooting & Mitcham United (8)	155
98	Merstham (8)	2–2	Chipstead (8)	146
replay	Chipstead (8)	3–4 (a.e.t.)	Merstham (8)	131
99	Maidstone United (7)	10–0	Littlehampton Town (9)	1,373
100	VCD Athletic (7)	3–2	Hampton & Richmond Borough (7)	97
101	Bognor Regis Town (7)	0–0	Lewes (7)	371
replay	Lewes (7)	1–0	Bognor Regis Town (7)	405
102	Blackfield & Langley (9)	3–2	Sherborne Town (9)	53
103	Horndean (9)	0–1	Newport (Isle of Wight) (9)	
104	Yate Town (8)	1–2	Dorchester Town (7)	189
105	Winchester City (9)	3–0	Bemerton Heath Harlequins (9)	150
106	Sholing (8)	0–1	Chippenham Town (7)	132
107	Mangotsfield United (8)	0–3	Weymouth (7)	297
108	Poole Town (7)	4–0	Bradford Town (9)	359
109	Longwell Green Sports (9)	0–1	Folland Sports (9)	109
110	AFC Totton (8)	0–2	Swindon Supermarine (8)	254
111	Bodmin Town (10)	3–3	Bridgwater Town (8)	116
replay	Bridgwater Town (8)	2–1	Bodmin Town (10)	189
112	Paulton Rovers (7)	3–1	Taunton Town (8)	168
113	Tiverton Town (8)	0–0	Bideford (7)	356
replay	Bideford (7)	1–0	Tiverton Town (8)	330
114	Frome Town (7)	2–0	Wimborne Town (8)	153
115	Truro City (7)	0–2	Larkhall Athletic (8)	414
116	Willand Rovers (9)	2–1	Saltash United (10)	84

== Second qualifying round ==
Second qualifying round fixtures were due to be played on 27 September 2014, with replays no later than 2 October. A total of 160 teams took part in this stage of the competition, including the 116 winners from the first qualifying round and 44 entering at this stage from the two divisions at Level 6 of English football. Ellistown & Ibstock United and Blaby & Whetstone Athletic from Level 10 were still in the competition, being the lowest ranked teams in this round.

Tie	Home team (tier)	Score	Away team (tier)	Att.
1	Bradford Park Avenue (6)	2–2	AFC Fylde (6)	254
replay	AFC Fylde (6)	2–1 (a.e.t.)	Bradford Park Avenue (6)	287
2	Curzon Ashton (7)	1–0	Scarborough Athletic (8)	236
3	Droylsden (8)	0–1	Guiseley (6)	238
4	Barrow (6)	0–1	Runcorn Town (9)	1,370
5	Workington (7)	0–1	Bamber Bridge (8)	430
6	Harrogate Town (6)	1–2	Stockport County (6)	604
7	Warrington Town (8)	0–0	Sheffield (8)	190
replay	Sheffield (8)	1–3	Warrington Town (8)	176
8	Shildon (9)	1–0	Stalybridge Celtic (6)	340
9	Colwyn Bay (6)	3–2	Harrogate Railway Athletic (8)	223
10	Buxton (7)	2–0	Newcastle Benfield (9)	301
11	Hyde (6)	4–5	Marine (7)	313
12	Skelmersdale United (7)	1–4	Blyth Spartans (7)	250
13	Gainsborough Trinity (6)	4–1	Farsley (8)	343
14	Ashton United (7)	1–1	Salford City (8)	234
replay	Salford City (8)	0–1	Ashton United (7)	433
15	Chorley (6)	1–0	Glossop North End (9)	675
16	FC United Of Manchester (7)	0–1	Lancaster City (8)	1,033
17	Cleethorpes Town (9)	1–2	North Ferriby United (6)	321
18	Dunston UTS (9)	1–4	Spennymoor Town (8)	538
19	Norton United (8)	2–1	Spalding United (8)	125
20	Bedworth United (8)	1–1	Mickleover Sports (8)	185
replay	Mickleover Sports (8)	3–0	Bedworth United (8)	134
21	Worcester City (6)	3–1	Rugby Town (8)	570
22	Ellistown & Ibstock United (10)	1–7	Halesowen Town (7)	180
23	Histon (7)	0–0	Evesham United (8)	227
replay	Evesham United (8)	3–1	Histon (7)	267
24	Boston United (6)	3–1	Dereham Town (8)	836
25	Barwell (7)	0–0	Norwich United (9)	118
replay	Norwich United (9)	0–2	Barwell (7)	105
26	Ilkeston (7)	1–0	Solihull Moors (6)	310
27	Blaby & Whetstone Athletic (10)	1–1	Stourbridge (7)	173
replay	Stourbridge (7)	4–1	Blaby & Whetstone Athletic (10)	293
28	Leamington (6)	4–1	Wroxham (8)	371
29	Coalville Town (8)	0–0	Lowestoft Town (6)	165
replay	Lowestoft Town (6)	5–0	Coalville Town (8)	397
30	Tamworth (6)	2–1	Rushall Olympic (7)	587
31	Stamford (7)	1–2	Grantham Town (7)	381
32	King's Lynn Town (7)	1–0	Hednesford Town (6)	556
33	Tividale (8)	2–2	Leek Town (8)	278
replay	Leek Town (8)	1–0	Tividale (8)	307
34	Redhill (8)	2–1	Tonbridge Angels (7)	321
35	VCD Athletic (7)	0–4	Harrow Borough (7)	105
36	Ebbsfleet United (6)	7–1	Hythe Town (8)	738
37	Needham Market (8)	5–2	London Tigers (9)	248
38	Hendon (7)	4–1	Leiston (7)	195
39	Hemel Hempstead Town (6)	2–0	Dunstable Town (7)	544
40	Hitchin Town (7)	0–3	Wingate & Finchley (7)	261
41	Chelmsford City (6)	6–0	Worthing (8)	547
42	Dorking Wanderers (9)	2–2	Biggleswade Town (7)	151
replay	Biggleswade Town (7)	1–0	Dorking Wanderers (9)	160

Tie	Home team (tier)	Score	Away team (tier)	Att.
43	Staines Town (6)	5–0	Leverstock Green (9)	241
44	Bromley (6)	5–1	Uxbridge (8)	530
45	Maidstone United (7)	2–1	Brentwood Town (8)	1,464
46	Bishop's Stortford (6)	0–0	Tooting & Mitcham United (8)	322
replay	Tooting & Mitcham United (8)	3–1	Bishop's Stortford (6)	253
47	Eastbourne Borough (6)	1–1	Enfield Town (7)	522
replay	Enfield Town (7)	4–4 (3–4 p)	Eastbourne Borough (6)	357
48	Hayes & Yeading United (6)	0–1	St Albans City (6)	272
49	Boreham Wood (6)	3–2	East Preston (9)	151
50	Brackley Town (6)	2–2	Farnborough (6)	208
replay	Farnborough (6)	0–1	Brackley Town (6)	179
51	Witham Town (7)	4–2	Lewes (7)	121
52	Margate (7)	1–2	Barton Rovers (8)	638
53	Whitehawk (6)	2–1	Merstham (8)	123
54	F.C. Romania (9)	2–3	Sutton United (6)	242
55	Burnham (7)	0–1	Canvey Island (7)	135
56	Billericay Town (7)	2–1	Raynes Park Vale (9)	237
57	Grays Athletic (7)	1–0	Hastings United (8)	231
58	Maidenhead United (6)	4–0	Faversham Town (8)	331
59	Thurrock (8)	0–2	Aveley (8)	164
60	Fleet Town (8)	0–4	Burgess Hill Town (8)	154
61	Wealdstone (6)	1–1	Concord Rangers (6)	312
replay	Concord Rangers (6)	2–0	Wealdstone (6)	220
62	Waltham Abbey (8)	1–0	North Greenford United (8)	91
63	Kettering Town (8)	0–1	Chalfont St Peter (8)	696
64	Beaconsfield SYCOB (8)	1–3	Greenwich Borough (9)	140
65	Romford (8)	0–0	Kingstonian (7)	125
replay	Kingstonian (7)	5–3 (a.e.t.)	Romford (8)	258
66	Metropolitan Police (7)	3–4	East Thurrock United (7)	111
67	Winchester City (9)	3–3	Newport (Isle of Wight) (9)	220
replay	Newport (Isle of Wight) (9)	0–1	Winchester City (9)	306
68	Paulton Rovers (7)	1–1	Gloucester City (6)	327
replay	Gloucester City (6)	2–1	Paulton Rovers (7)	377
69	Folland Sports (9)	1–1	Frome Town (7)	93
replay	Frome Town (7)	1–0	Folland Sports (9)	179
70	Bridgwater Town (8)	0–2	Basingstoke Town (6)	282
71	Larkhall Athletic (8)	3–3	Gosport Borough (6)	205
replay	Gosport Borough (6)	7–0	Larkhall Athletic (8)	206
72	Havant & Waterlooville (6)	3–0	Swindon Supermarine (8)	386
73	Weston Super Mare (6)	3–0	Banbury United (7)	279
74	Blackfield & Langley (9)	0–0	Willand Rovers (9)	95
replay	Willand Rovers (9)	1–0	Blackfield & Langley (9)	221
75	Abingdon United (9)	0–2	Dorchester Town (7)	311
76	Shortwood United (8)	2–1	Oxford City (6)	211
77	Bath City (6)	1–1	Poole Town (7)	547
replay	Poole Town (7)	0–2	Bath City (6)	516
78	Weymouth (7)	4–1	Bideford (7)	620
79	Chippenham Town (7)	1–0	Ardley United (9)	256
80	Flackwell Heath (9)	W.O.	Salisbury City (6)	N/A
Walkover for Flackwell Heath as Salisbury City were removed.

== Third qualifying round ==
Third qualifying round fixtures were due to be played on 11 October 2014, with replays taking place no later than 16 October 2014. A total of 80 teams took part in this stage of the competition, all winners from the second qualifying round. The round featured six teams from Level 9 still in the competition, being the lowest ranked teams in this round.

Tie	Home team (tier)	Score	Away team (tier)	Att.
1	North Ferriby United (6)	2–1	Grantham Town (7)	417
2	Tamworth (6)	1–0	Lowestoft Town (6)	564
3	Leamington (6)	1–1	Worcester City (6)	755
replay	Worcester City (6)	2–0	Leamington (6)	598
4	Guiseley (6)	3–0	Halesowen Town (7)	671
5	Runcorn Town (9)	2–5	Norton United (8)	215
6	Shildon (9)	0–0	Stourbridge (7)	490
replay	Stourbridge (7)	0–2	Shildon (9)	488
7	AFC Fylde (6)	1–0	Buxton (7)	639
8	Mickleover Sports (8)	1–2	Blyth Spartans (7)	611
9	Stockport County (6)	1–0	Ilkeston (7)	2,562
10	Barwell (7)	2 –1	Curzon Ashton (7)	231
11	Colwyn Bay (6)	1–1	Warrington Town (8)	453
replay	Warrington Town (8)	1–0	Colwyn Bay (6)	284
12	Leek Town (8)	2–0	Boston United (6)	769
13	Bamber Bridge (8)	1–4	Chorley (6)	2,214
14	King's Lynn Town (7)	3–2	Lancaster City (8)	983
15	Gainsborough Trinity (6)	4–0	Marine (7)	473
16	Spennymoor Town (8)	1–0	Ashton United (7)	651
17	Grays Athletic (7)	0–0	Bromley (6)	350
replay	Bromley (6)	5–0	Grays Athletic (7)	455
18	Dorchester Town (7)	1–0	Hendon (7)	510
19	Barton Rovers (8)	0–1	Canvey Island (7)	220
20	Frome Town (7)	2–2	Boreham Wood (6)	282
replay	Boreham Wood (6)	1–0	Frome Town (7)	201

Tie	Home team (tier)	Score	Away team (tier)	Att.
21	Biggleswade Town (7)	0–2	Maidstone United (7)	450
22	Evesham United (8)	4–1	Chalfont St Peter (8)	434
23	Staines Town (6)	1–1	Gloucester City (6)	386
replay	Gloucester City (6)	3–2	Staines Town (6)	405
24	Chippenham Town (7)	0–5	Hemel Hempstead Town (6)	398
25	Concord Rangers (6)	3–2	Winchester City (9)	202
26	Willand Rovers (9)	3–2	Aveley (8)	298
27	East Thurrock United (7)	2–1	Tooting & Mitcham United (8)	224
28	Billericay Town (7)	0–1	Weymouth (7)	456
29	Wingate & Finchley (7)	0–2	Havant & Waterlooville (6)	292
30	Maidenhead United (6)	1–1	Gosport Borough (6)	519
replay	Gosport Borough (6)	3–0	Maidenhead United (6)	329
31	Needham Market (8)	1–2	Witham Town (7)	339
32	Kingstonian (7)	2–3	Eastbourne Borough (6)	555
33	Flackwell Heath (9)	1–4	Weston Super Mare (6)	212
34	Greenwich Borough (9)	1–0	Redhill (8)	227
35	Bath City (6)	2–2	Shortwood United (8)	641
replay	Shortwood United (8)	1–3	Bath City (6)	374
36	Ebbsfleet United (6)	1–2	Basingstoke Town (6)	953
37	Harrow Borough (7)	2–1	Waltham Abbey (8)	182
38	St Albans City (6)	2–0	Brackley Town (6)	607
39	Sutton United (6)	1–3	Burgess Hill Town (8)	566
40	Whitehawk (6)	4–4	Chelmsford City (6)	319
replay	Chelmsford City (6)	4–1	Whitehawk (6)	576

== Fourth qualifying round ==
Fourth qualifying round fixtures were due to be played on 25 October 2014, with replays taking place no later than 30 October 2014. A total of 64 teams took part in this stage of the competition, including the 40 winners from the third qualifying round and 24 entering at this stage from the Conference Premier at Level 5 of English football. The round featured Willand Rovers, Greenwich Borough and Shildon from Level 9 still in the competition, being the lowest ranked teams in this round.

Tie	Home team (tier)	Score	Away team (tier)	Att.
1	Spennymoor Town (8)	2–2	AFC Telford United (5)	853
replay	AFC Telford United (5)	3–0	Spennymoor Town (8)	934
2	King's Lynn Town (7)	3–4	AFC Fylde (6)	1,403
3	Grimsby Town (5)	3–0	Guiseley (6)	1,761
4	Norton United (8)	1–1	Shildon (9)	422
replay	Shildon (9)	1–2	Norton United (8)	936
5	Warrington Town (8)	1–0	North Ferriby United (6)	691
6	Alfreton Town (5)	1–1	Lincoln City (5)	886
replay	Lincoln City (5)	5–1	Alfreton Town (5)	1,529
7	Macclesfield Town (5)	1–1	Wrexham (5)	1,876
replay	Wrexham (5)	5–2	Macclesfield Town (5)	2,260
8	Chorley (6)	0–0	FC Halifax Town (5)	2,333
replay	FC Halifax Town (5)	5–0	Chorley (6)	1,681
9	Barwell (7)	0–3	Altrincham (5)	523
10	Leek Town (8)	3–4	Blyth Spartans (7)	1,047
11	Stockport County (6)	2–4	Chester (5)	4,612
12	Gateshead (5)	4–0	Gainsborough Trinity (6)	824
13	Tamworth (6)	1–1	Southport (5)	814
replay	Southport (5)	1–1 (4–2 p)	Tamworth (6)	590
14	Dorchester Town (7)	1–7	Bristol Rovers (5)	1,909
15	East Thurrock United (7)	7–1	Bath City (6)	301
16	Gloucester City (6)	1–4	Forest Green Rovers (5)	2,067

Tie	Home team (tier)	Score	Away team (tier)	Att.
17	Dartford (5)	3–1	Burgess Hill Town (8)	929
18	Maidstone United (7)	2–1	Welling United (5)	2,226
19	Willand Rovers (9)	1–3	Gosport Borough (6)	892
20	Witham Town (7)	1–2	Weston-super-Mare (6)	620
21	Eastbourne Borough (6)	0–0	Dover Athletic (5)	911
replay	Dover Athletic (5)	1–0	Eastbourne Borough (6)	1,042
22	Weymouth (7)	0–0	Braintree Town (5)	989
replay	Braintree Town (5)	5–3	Weymouth (7)	480
23	Worcester City (6)	2–1	Greenwich Borough (9)	896
24	Canvey Island (7)	0–0	Havant & Waterlooville (6)	642
replay	Havant & Waterlooville (6)	3–0	Canvey Island (7)	574
25	St Albans City (6)	0–1	Concord Rangers (6)	953
26	Basingstoke Town (6)	1–1	Harrow Borough (7)	728
replay	Harrow Borough (7)	1–4	Basingstoke Town (6)	380
27	Aldershot Town (5)	2–0	Torquay United (5)	1,690
28	Kidderminster Harriers (5)	0–1	Eastleigh (5)	1,489
29	Evesham United (8)	1–2	Bromley (6)	811
30	Chelmsford City (6)	0–0	Barnet (5)	1,844
replay	Barnet (5)	4–1	Chelmsford City (6)	1,294
31	Nuneaton Town (5)	0–0	Hemel Hempstead Town (6)	930
replay	Hemel Hempstead Town (6)	2–0	Nuneaton Town (5)	1,222
32	Woking (5)	2–1	Boreham Wood (6)	1,222

== Competition proper ==
Winners from fourth qualifying round advance to First round proper, where teams from League One (Level 3) and League Two (Level 4) of English football, operating in The Football League, first enter the competition. See 2014–15 FA Cup for a report of first round proper onwards.
