= 2014–15 Eastern Counties Football League =

The 2014–15 season was the 73rd in the history of Eastern Counties Football League, a football competition in England.

Norwich United were champions, winning their first Eastern Counties Football League title.

== Premier Division ==
Eastern Counties Football League Premier Division
- Season: 2014–15
- Champions: Norwich United
- Relegated: Diss Town; Ely City; Wivenhoe Town
- Matches: 380
- Goals: 1,276 (3.36 per match)

After the promotion of Brightlingsea Regent to the Isthmian League, the resignation of Cambridge Regional College and the relegation of Woodbridge Town to Division One at the end of the previous season, the Premier Division remained at 20 clubs, and featured three new clubs promoted from Division One:

- Fakenham Town
- Ipswich Wanderers
- Whitton United

The following four clubs applied for promotion to Step 4: Godmanchester Rovers, Haverhill Rovers, Norwich United and Stanway Rovers. However, Norwich United, Godmanchester Rovers and Stanway Rovers all withdrew from the process, and with Haverhill Rovers outside the top three, it meant that no team would be promoted from the league for the first time since the 2007-08 season.

=== League table ===
Pos	Team	Pld	W	D	L	GF	GA	GD	Pts	Promotion or relegation
1	Norwich United	38	33	2	3	103	24	+79	101	
2	Godmanchester Rovers	38	24	3	11	89	37	+52	75	
3	Stanway Rovers	38	21	11	6	82	40	+42	74	
4	Kirkley & Pakefield	38	21	7	10	78	44	+34	70	
5	Felixstowe & Walton United	38	19	10	9	71	50	+21	67	
6	Newmarket Town	38	16	14	8	68	55	+13	62	
7	Hadleigh United	38	17	9	12	71	61	+10	60	
8	Brantham Athletic	38	17	4	17	71	66	+5	55	
9	Ipswich Wanderers	38	14	11	13	77	61	+16	53	
10	Mildenhall Town	38	16	4	18	62	62	0	52	
11	Whitton United	38	14	9	15	72	69	+3	51	
12	Gorleston	38	12	11	15	65	68	−3	47	
13	Fakenham Town	38	12	9	17	43	61	−18	45	
14	Thetford Town	38	11	9	18	53	76	−23	42	
15	Walsham-le-Willows	38	12	4	22	57	74	−17	40	
16	Clacton	38	12	4	22	56	76	−20	40	
17	Haverhill Rovers	38	9	13	16	44	83	−39	40	
18	Wivenhoe Town	38	8	13	17	40	60	−20	37	Relegated to Division One
19	Diss Town	38	6	8	24	32	103	−71	26	Relegated to Division One
20	Ely City	38	5	7	26	42	106	−64	22	Relegated to Division One

Source: fchd FA Full-time
Rules for classification: 1) points; 2) goal difference; 3) number of goals scored.

=== Results ===
Home \ Away	BRA	DIS	ELY	FCC	FAK	FEL	GOD	GOR	HAD	HAV	IPS	KIR	MIL	NEW	NOR	STA	THE	WAL	WHI	WIV
Brantham Athletic		4–1	1–2	1–3	1–0	2–1	2–1	4–0	0–1	3–0	2–2	2–1	3–1	0–2	3–4	1–1	2–0	2–1	3–2	6–0
Diss Town	3–1		1–1	0–4	1–2	0–1	0–7	1–3	0–1	1–3	1–4	1–4	0–3	2–2	1–4	0–2	3–3	1–0	0–5	2–0
Ely City	0–3	1–2		1–4	0–2	2–0	1–0	2–1	0–3	2–2	0–7	2–4	0–2	1–2	0–5	1–1	1–3	0–2	1–4	1–2
Clacton	3–0	5–1	2–4		4–1	1–5	0–4	1–1	0–1	2–2	1–5	1–0	3–2	0–1	0–1	1–3	1–2	0–1	0–2	1–0
Fakenham Town	1–3	1–0	1–1	1–0		1–2	0–4	2–2	0–1	4–1	0–0	0–4	0–1	2–2	0–3	0–4	2–1	2–2	2–0	2–1
Felixstowe & Walton United	2–3	4–0	6–0	1–0	4–3		1–1	2–1	1–1	2–2	0–2	1–4	1–0	2–2	1–4	1–2	2–2	4–2	2–6	1–0
Godmanchester Rovers	2–1	4–2	0–0	11–3	0–1	0–1		5–1	4–1	3–0	5–1	4–0	3–0	1–0	0–3	1–2	3–2	0–3	1–0	3–0
Gorleston	4–1	0–0	2–0	1–1	3–4	1–2	2–1		3–0	4–1	4–2	0–2	3–2	1–1	3–1	2–3	1–1	1–4	1–2	1–1
Hadleigh United	2–1	8–0	3–3	6–0	0–2	0–2	2–3	0–1		4–0	0–4	3–3	0–2	2–2	0–1	1–1	0–2	4–3	3–2	2–1
Haverhill Rovers	4–2	0–1	3–1	0–4	1–0	1–1	1–0	2–2	0–2		1–8	0–5	2–1	0–5	1–2	0–6	0–0	2–0	2–2	2–1
Ipswich Wanderers	1–1	4–0	2–2	2–0	3–2	1–1	1–4	2–0	2–2	0–0		0–2	1–3	1–1	0–1	2–4	2–1	2–3	4–1	1–1
Kirkley & Pakefield	3–0	4–0	3–0	2–0	1–0	1–3	1–1	1–1	1–2	1–1	2–0		2–0	2–1	1–2	2–1	4–0	3–1	0–0	1–1
Mildenhall Town	5–1	2–2	4–3	1–0	2–0	0–4	0–1	2–0	0–0	1–1	5–1	2–4		0–2	0–4	0–1	1–2	3–0	3–3	5–1
Newmarket Town	3–2	1–1	4–2	2–0	1–1	2–2	0–2	4–2	3–3	4–2	2–2	2–0	0–2		1–4	2–2	2–1	2–0	2–1	0–0
Norwich United	1–2	4–0	7–0	3–1	0–0	1–0	2–1	4–2	5–0	3–0	2–1	1–1	2–1	2–1		2–1	4–0	2–0	4–0	4–0
Stanway Rovers	1–1	6–0	3–2	2–1	0–0	1–2	0–1	1–2	1–3	0–0	4–2	2–1	4–0	4–0	2–0		2–1	3–0	1–1	1–1
Thetford Town	0–4	1–1	2–1	1–4	3–0	1–3	3–0	3–3	0–4	2–4	1–0	2–1	1–2	3–3	0–2	2–5		2–1	1–1	1–1
Walsham-le-Willows	2–1	5–1	5–0	1–1	3–1	1–1	0–3	0–5	3–3	2–1	0–1	2–4	2–4	1–2	0–1	1–2	2–1		1–2	0–4
Whitton United	4–2	0–1	3–2	1–2	2–3	0–2	0–3	1–1	5–1	1–1	0–2	4–1	3–0	1–2	0–6	3–3	3–0	3–2		6–4
Wivenhoe Town	2–0	1–1	5–2	3–2	0–0	0–0	0–2	2–1	0–2	1–1	2–2	1–2	2–0	1–0	0–2	0–0	1–2	0–1	0–0	

Source: FA Full-Time
Legend: Blue = home team win; Yellow = draw; Red = away team win.

=== Stadia and locations ===
Locations of the Premier Division clubs

Team	Stadium	Capacity
Brantham Athletic	Brantham Leisure Centre	1,200
Clacton	The Rush Green Bowl	3,000
Diss Town	Brewers Green Lane	2,500
Ely City	Unwin Sports Ground	1,500
Fakenham Town	Clipbush Park	2,000
Felixstowe & Walton United	Dellwood Avenue	2,000
Godmanchester Rovers	Bearscroft Lane	1,050
Gorleston	Emerald Park	3,000
Hadleigh United	Millfield	3,000
Haverhill Rovers	New Croft	3,000
Ipswich Wanderers	Humber Doucy Lane	1,000
Kirkley & Pakefield	Walmer Road	2,000
Mildenhall Town	Recreation Way	2,000
Newmarket Town	Cricket Field Road	2,750
Norwich United	Plantation Park	3,000
Stanway Rovers	Hawthorns	1,500
Thetford Town	Mundford Road	1,500
Walsham-le-Willows	Summer Road	1,000
Whitton United	King George V Playing Fields	1,000
Wivenhoe Town	Broad Lane	2,876

== Division One ==
Eastern Counties Football League Division One
- Season: 2014–15
- Champions: Long Melford
- Promoted: Long Melford; Saffron Walden Town; Swaffham Town
- Matches: 342
- Goals: 1,126 (3.29 per match)

After Whitton United, Fakenham Town and Ipswich Wanderers were promoted to the Premier Division at the end of the previous season, Division One remained at 19 clubs, and featured three new clubs:

- King's Lynn Town reserves, promoted from the Peterborough and District League
- Leiston reserves
- Woodbridge Town, relegated from the Premier Division

=== League table ===
Pos	Team	Pld	W	D	L	GF	GA	GD	Pts	Promotion
1	Long Melford	36	27	5	4	101	33	+68	86	Promoted to the Premier Division
2	Swaffham Town	36	26	5	5	98	40	+58	83	Promoted to the Premier Division
3	Saffron Walden Town	36	23	9	4	61	31	+30	78	Promoted to the Premier Division
4	Great Yarmouth Town	36	23	7	6	68	34	+34	76	
5	King's Lynn Town reserves	36	20	5	11	76	38	+38	65	
6	Haverhill Borough	36	19	7	10	55	28	+27	64	
7	Debenham LC	36	18	8	10	65	46	+19	62	
8	March Town United	36	19	5	12	63	47	+16	62	
9	Downham Town	36	15	9	12	63	55	+8	54	
10	Halstead Town	36	15	9	12	60	52	+8	54	
11	Stowmarket Town	36	12	7	17	66	72	−6	43	
12	Team Bury	36	12	7	17	43	56	−13	43	
13	Braintree Town reserves	36	11	6	19	54	78	−24	39	
14	A.F.C. Sudbury reserves	36	10	6	20	55	72	−17	36	
15	Dereham Town reserves	36	7	8	21	50	90	−40	29	
16	Needham Market reserves	36	7	5	24	37	95	−58	26	
17	Woodbridge Town	36	6	7	23	38	81	−43	25	
18	Cornard United	36	5	5	26	44	84	−40	20	
19	Leiston reserves	36	4	6	26	29	94	−65	18	

Source: fchd FA Full-time
Rules for classification: 1) points; 2) goal difference; 3) number of goals scored.

=== Results ===
Home \ Away	AFS	BRA	COR	DEB	DER	DOW	GYT	HAL	HAV	KLT	LEI	LOM	MAR	NEM	SAF	STO	SWA	TBU	WOO
A.F.C. Sudbury reserves		2–3	1–0	2–4	3–1	4–0	1–2	4–1	1–2	0–2	2–2	0–7	3–3	8–0	2–3	0–3	1–6	1–0	3–0
Braintree Town reserves	1–0		4–2	3–1	4–2	1–1	0–2	1–3	2–0	0–5	0–1	0–3	2–1	2–0	0–1	0–3	2–3	2–1	3–3
Cornard United	2–0	0–2		0–2	2–2	0–3	1–4	0–2	0–3	2–6	2–4	0–1	0–1	1–3	1–2	2–2	2–0	0–1	4–2
Debenham LC	1–1	2–1	4–2		1–1	2–0	1–0	4–3	1–1	2–2	4–0	1–5	1–0	4–0	0–3	1–0	0–3	2–1	3–0
Dereham Town reserves	1–3	3–3	1–1	0–2		3–2	1–4	1–0	1–5	1–1	5–2	1–4	2–1	0–2	0–2	2–3	1–4	3–1	2–2
Downham Town	3–1	2–2	2–0	1–1	3–1		2–4	5–1	1–0	1–0	4–0	2–1	0–1	4–0	0–2	4–2	2–2	2–0	4–0
Great Yarmouth Town	3–0	2–0	3–2	0–3	3–1	1–1		1–1	1–0	0–5	1–1	1–1	1–1	4–1	1–0	4–1	0–0	2–0	4–1
Halstead Town	1–1	2–1	1–1	1–1	7–1	6–0	0–3		1–0	2–1	1–0	2–0	0–2	2–0	2–2	0–2	0–2	1–1	1–3
Haverhill Borough	3–0	2–0	3–0	3–0	2–0	2–1	2–0	4–1		2–1	4–1	0–0	1–1	0–1	1–1	2–1	3–0	0–1	2–1
King's Lynn Town reserves	2–2	6–2	3–0	1–0	0–0	2–1	0–2	0–0	2–1		5–1	2–3	3–1	2–0	0–2	2–0	3–1	0–1	3–2
Leiston reserves	0–2	1–4	0–1	0–6	0–1	1–1	1–2	1–3	0–0	0–4		2–3	0–5	2–0	0–2	1–5	0–4	0–1	1–0
Long Melford	3–0	3–1	3–1	2–1	4–1	4–0	3–2	4–1	1–0	1–0	1–0		6–0	9–1	3–3	1–3	1–4	2–0	3–0
March Town United	2–1	3–1	3–2	5–1	2–1	2–2	2–0	0–2	3–1	1–0	4–1	0–4		4–1	0–1	2–0	1–2	3–1	0–2
Needham Market reserves	3–1	2–0	5–5	0–0	3–3	0–1	0–4	1–3	0–2	1–3	1–1	1–3	2–1		0–2	4–5	0–2	1–4	0–2
Saffron Walden Town	2–0	2–2	1–0	2–1	2–0	1–0	1–1	2–1	0–1	3–1	4–1	0–0	0–1	2–2		2–1	0–3	2–2	1–1
Stowmarket Town	1–2	4–1	3–1	1–1	4–1	1–3	0–2	1–1	1–1	1–4	3–3	1–4	0–4	4–0	0–1		2–8	0–2	4–1
Swaffham Town	2–1	5–2	3–1	2–1	4–2	3–1	0–1	1–1	2–0	2–0	5–1	2–2	2–1	3–0	0–1	1–1		5–2	5–1
Team Bury	1–0	2–2	4–3	0–3	3–1	3–3	0–1	0–3	0–0	0–2	2–0	0–3	0–0	0–1	2–3	2–1	3–4		2–0
Woodbridge Town	2–2	3–0	0–3	0–3	1–3	1–1	0–2	1–3	1–2	0–3	2–0	0–3	1–2	2–1	1–3	2–2	0–3	0–0	

Source: FA Full-Time
Legend: Blue = home team win; Yellow = draw; Red = away team win.

=== Stadia and locations ===
Locations of Division One clubs

Team	Stadium	Capacity
A.F.C. Sudbury reserves	King's Marsh	2,500
Braintree Town reserves	Cressing Road	4,202
Cornard United	Blackhouse Lane	2,000
Debenham LC	Maitlands	1,000
Dereham Town reserves	Aldiss Park	3,000
Downham Town	Memorial Field	1,000
Great Yarmouth Town	Wellesley Recreation Ground	3,600
Halstead Town	Rosemary Lane	1,000
Haverhill Borough	New Croft (groundshare with Haverhill Rovers)	3,000
King's Lynn Town reserves	The Walks	5,733
Leiston reserves	Victory Road	2,500
Long Melford	Stoneylands	
March Town United	The GER Sports Ground	
Needham Market reserves	Bloomfields	4,000
Saffron Walden Town	Catons Lane	2,000
Stowmarket Town	Greens Meadow	1,000
Swaffham Town	Shoemakers Lane	
Team Bury	Ram Meadow	3,500
Woodbridge Town	Notcutts Park	3,000
