= 2015–16 Eastern Counties Football League =

The 2015–16 season was the 74th in the history of Eastern Counties Football League, a football competition in England.

Norwich United were champions, winning their second Eastern Counties Football League title in a row and were promoted to the Isthmian League for the first time in their history.

== Premier Division ==
Eastern Counties Football League Premier Division
- Season: 2015–16
- Champions: Norwich United
- Promoted: Norwich United
- Relegated: Whitton United
- Matches: 380
- Goals: 1,298 (3.42 per match)

The Premier Division featured 17 clubs which competed in the division last season, along with three new clubs, promoted from the Division One:

- Long Melford
- Saffron Walden Town
- Swaffham Town

The following five clubs applied for promotion to Step 4: Godmanchester Rovers, Ipswich Wanderers, Mildenhall Town, Norwich United and Stanway Rovers.

=== League table ===
Pos	Team	Pld	W	D	L	GF	GA	GD	Pts	Promotion or relegation
1	Norwich United	38	32	2	4	90	30	+60	98	Promoted to the Isthmian League
2	Godmanchester Rovers	38	30	4	4	130	38	+92	94	
3	Stanway Rovers	38	28	6	4	102	38	+64	90	
4	Felixstowe & Walton United	38	25	7	6	73	26	+47	82	
5	Kirkley & Pakefield	38	22	7	9	78	44	+34	73	
6	Mildenhall Town	38	18	10	10	76	42	+34	64	
7	Hadleigh United	38	16	7	15	62	58	+4	55	
8	Saffron Walden Town	38	17	3	18	50	48	+2	54	
9	Long Melford	38	16	5	17	63	58	+5	53	
10	Clacton	38	15	4	19	65	79	−14	49	
11	Brantham Athletic	38	14	5	19	56	62	−6	47	
12	Haverhill Rovers	38	11	8	19	40	73	−33	41	
13	Newmarket Town	38	11	6	21	58	90	−32	39	
14	Walsham-le-Willows	38	10	8	20	62	75	−13	38	
15	Ipswich Wanderers	38	9	11	18	54	76	−22	38	
16	Gorleston	38	10	7	21	43	79	−36	37	
17	Fakenham Town	38	10	6	22	45	84	−39	36	
18	Swaffham Town	38	9	8	21	55	92	−37	35	
19	Thetford Town	38	9	6	23	57	98	−41	33	
20	Whitton United	38	6	4	28	39	108	−69	22	Relegated to Division One

Source: fchd FA Full Time
Rules for classification: 1) points; 2) goal difference; 3) number of goals scored.

=== Results ===
Home \ Away	BRA	FCC	FAK	FEL	GOD	GOR	HAD	HAV	IPS	KIR	LOM	MIL	NEW	NOR	SAF	STA	SWA	THE	WAL	WHI
Brantham Athletic		0–1	1–1	0–2	1–0	3–0	0–3	0–0	3–1	1–3	4–1	1–2	3–0	1–2	0–3	1–1	4–1	7–3	0–2	3–0
Clacton	2–0		3–1	1–2	1–4	4–0	0–3	0–2	2–2	2–2	2–0	0–4	0–1	2–4	3–0	2–4	4–1	3–0	1–1	4–3
Fakenham Town	1–3	1–5		0–2	1–6	0–3	3–0	2–0	1–1	0–1	3–1	3–3	3–6	0–2	1–1	2–6	0–1	1–0	2–0	2–1
Felixstowe & Walton United	3–2	3–0	2–0		0–0	0–0	1–0	3–0	2–1	0–1	1–0	2–2	1–1	2–3	0–1	0–1	4–0	3–1	2–0	2–0
Godmanchester Rovers	4–2	2–4	5–0	3–2		1–1	4–0	6–0	5–1	7–0	1–0	2–2	4–1	3–0	0–0	6–1	6–1	8–0	4–3	3–0
Gorleston	1–0	1–0	1–0	1–1	0–3		1–2	2–1	0–3	1–1	1–2	2–5	1–2	0–2	3–0	0–4	3–0	1–3	1–3	4–2
Hadleigh United	5–0	1–0	2–2	0–4	2–3	4–2		1–1	1–1	1–0	0–1	2–1	3–2	1–2	1–2	0–2	3–2	2–2	1–1	2–0
Haverhill Rovers	1–0	0–3	3–0	0–3	0–3	0–1	1–4		1–1	0–1	0–3	0–1	1–2	0–1	1–0	3–1	1–1	0–4	2–1	1–1
Ipswich Wanderers	1–1	2–0	1–2	1–2	0–3	2–4	3–1	2–2		1–2	0–3	2–1	4–1	2–6	1–0	1–2	1–1	0–1	2–2	3–1
Kirkley & Pakefield	2–0	4–1	0–0	1–1	5–0	1–0	2–1	2–2	3–1		5–0	0–1	1–1	1–3	2–0	4–2	3–0	4–4	4–3	7–0
Long Melford	0–1	4–0	3–1	0–0	0–7	4–0	0–0	0–2	0–1	1–0		0–2	6–1	1–2	0–3	1–2	2–2	4–1	3–0	5–1
Mildenhall Town	0–1	3–0	4–0	0–1	1–3	6–0	0–0	4–1	3–3	3–0	1–2		3–1	0–2	1–0	1–1	2–1	4–0	1–1	4–0
Newmarket Town	1–4	0–2	3–4	1–3	1–5	1–1	2–1	2–3	3–1	1–0	0–3	2–1		0–0	1–2	0–3	1–0	0–0	1–2	1–0
Norwich United	4–0	4–0	1–0	0–2	1–2	2–1	4–2	4–1	3–1	2–0	3–1	3–0	4–1		2–0	0–0	3–1	4–0	1–0	3–0
Saffron Walden Town	0–1	4–0	4–1	2–3	1–2	3–2	0–3	0–1	3–0	0–2	0–2	2–1	0–2	1–2		1–2	0–0	3–1	1–0	3–2
Stanway Rovers	2–1	6–0	1–0	0–1	3–2	3–2	2–0	6–1	6–0	3–0	4–1	1–1	2–2	1–0	2–1		2–1	3–0	7–0	4–0
Swaffham Town	3–1	2–2	2–1	2–4	2–5	1–1	1–5	2–2	2–1	0–3	0–4	1–1	4–1	0–2	1–3	0–2		3–1	1–2	7–0
Thetford Town	0–2	4–2	5–2	0–2	0–4	4–0	0–1	1–3	1–4	0–3	3–3	0–0	5–3	2–3	0–1	0–5	6–2		3–2	0–0
Walsham-le-Willows	3–1	4–6	0–1	1–0	0–1	1–1	4–0	5–1	2–2	1–4	2–2	1–2	2–4	1–2	1–2	1–1	3–0	5–2		0–2
Whitton United	3–3	0–3	1–3	0–7	1–3	5–0	2–4	0–2	0–0	0–4	2–0	1–5	3–2	0–4	1–3	2–4	0–1	1–0	4–2	

Source: FA Full Time
Legend: Blue = home team win; Yellow = draw; Red = away team win.

=== Stadia and locations ===
Locations of the Premier Division clubs

Team	Stadium	Capacity
Brantham Athletic	Brantham Leisure Centre	1,200
Clacton	The Rush Green Bowl	3,000
Fakenham Town	Clipbush Park	2,000
Felixstowe & Walton United	Dellwood Avenue	2,000
Godmanchester Rovers	Bearscroft Lane	1,050
Gorleston	Emerald Park	3,000
Hadleigh United	Millfield	3,000
Haverhill Rovers	New Croft	3,000
Ipswich Wanderers	Humber Doucy Lane	1,000
Kirkley & Pakefield	Walmer Road	2,000
Long Melford	Stoneylands	
Mildenhall Town	Recreation Way	2,000
Newmarket Town	Cricket Field Road	2,750
Norwich United	Plantation Park	3,000
Saffron Walden Town	Catons Lane	2,000
Stanway Rovers	Hawthorns	1,500
Swaffham Town	Shoemakers Lane	
Thetford Town	Mundford Road	1,500
Walsham-le-Willows	Summer Road	1,000
Whitton United	King George V Playing Fields	1,000

== Division One ==
Eastern Counties Football League Division One
- Season: 2015–16
- Champions: Wivenhoe Town
- Promoted: Ely City; Great Yarmouth Town; Wivenhoe Town
- Matches: 341
- Goals: 1,231 (3.61 per match)

Division One featured 16 clubs which competed in the division last season, along with three new clubs, relegated from Premier Division:

- Diss Town
- Ely City
- Wivenhoe Town

=== League table ===
Pos	Team	Pld	W	D	L	GF	GA	GD	Pts	Promotion
1	Wivenhoe Town	36	28	5	3	101	34	+67	89	Promoted to the Premier Division
2	Ely City	36	28	2	6	87	38	+49	86	Promoted to the Premier Division
3	Great Yarmouth Town	36	26	2	8	98	37	+61	80	Promoted to the Premier Division
4	Halstead Town	36	24	3	9	78	49	+29	75	
5	King's Lynn Town reserves	36	21	7	8	85	42	+43	70	
6	Leiston reserves	36	19	2	15	86	69	+17	59	
7	Diss Town	36	15	9	12	72	55	+17	54	
8	Haverhill Borough	36	15	7	14	65	55	+10	52	
9	Woodbridge Town	36	14	10	12	53	52	+1	52	
10	AFC Sudbury reserves	36	15	7	14	55	55	0	52	
11	March Town United	36	16	2	18	68	65	+3	50	
12	Braintree Town reserves	36	15	4	17	76	89	−13	49	
13	Debenham LC	36	11	8	17	56	73	−17	41	
14	Stowmarket Town	36	11	7	18	60	69	−9	40	
15	Cornard United	36	9	5	22	42	73	−31	32	
16	Downham Town	36	8	7	21	35	81	−46	31	
17	Dereham Town reserves	35	7	4	24	40	85	−45	25	
18	Team Bury	35	5	5	25	32	90	−58	20	
19	Needham Market reserves	36	5	2	29	42	120	−78	17	

Source: fchd FA Full Time
Rules for classification: 1) points; 2) goal difference; 3) number of goals scored.

=== Results ===
Home \ Away	AFS	BRA	COR	DEB	DER	DIS	DOW	ELY	GYT	HAL	HAV	KLT	LEI	MAR	NEM	STO	TBU	WIV	WOO
A.F.C. Sudbury reserves		2–3	1–0	1–1	1–0	1–2	1–2	2–3	2–1	3–2	2–3	0–0	6–0	0–7	8–1	2–0	0–0	1–6	3–0
Braintree Town reserves	2–0		1–2	2–3	2–3	4–3	0–0	0–4	0–3	1–3	5–0	2–0	1–2	3–1	2–0	3–2	1–1	0–6	3–3
Cornard United	0–2	2–4		1–3	1–4	1–3	0–1	0–3	3–2	0–4	2–0	1–3	0–3	0–1	2–1	0–0	3–3	0–4	0–0
Debenham LC	1–1	2–1	3–0		1–2	0–7	5–0	0–3	0–3	1–3	1–1	1–0	1–6	3–0	0–3	2–2	4–0	2–4	1–1
Dereham Town reserves	0–1	1–6	1–3	2–2		0–2	0–1	1–5	0–3	1–3	0–4	1–2	1–2	2–1	3–3	1–2	4–1	0–5	1–2
Diss Town	0–1	9–2	1–1	5–1	3–0		1–0	3–3	1–0	1–3	1–1	1–1	1–1	2–3	3–1	2–1	0–1	1–1	1–1
Downham Town	2–2	2–1	2–1	0–0	1–2	0–4		2–2	2–3	2–3	0–3	2–2	0–5	1–4	1–1	0–1	2–2	0–3	3–1
Ely City	5–2	6–1	2–1	3–2	3–2	2–1	3–0		0–1	1–0	1–0	1–3	4–1	1–0	4–0	2–1	2–1	2–0	1–0
Great Yarmouth Town	2–0	5–1	5–1	0–3	2–0	3–0	0–1	5–2		1–1	4–1	3–1	6–1	5–2	9–0	3–2	1–0	0–0	2–0
Halstead Town	2–0	4–0	3–1	3–2	3–0	4–1	3–0	1–5	0–3		2–2	1–0	1–1	1–0	1–0	3–2	5–2	2–3	2–1
Haverhill Borough	1–4	3–4	4–0	2–0	1–1	2–1	5–0	0–2	0–2	0–1		1–1	4–0	1–5	1–0	3–0	5–0	2–3	0–1
King's Lynn Town reserves	4–1	4–1	3–2	0–0	2–0	5–2	2–0	0–1	2–1	0–2	2–1		3–1	2–1	7–1	2–2	6–0	4–0	4–0
Leiston Reserves	0–1	5–3	1–0	4–2	3–0	3–1	4–0	1–2	0–4	4–1	1–2	4–0		2–4	5–2	7–0	5–0	0–5	1–2
March Town United	0–1	2–2	1–0	2–1	5–2	1–3	4–2	0–2	0–2	0–1	1–1	2–4	3–1		3–2	3–1	2–0	1–3	1–2
Needham Market reserves	1–2	0–3	0–3	1–5	0–4	0–1	5–1	0–2	2–6	0–3	3–4	1–10	1–4	1–2		2–1	2–0	0–4	0–2
Stowmarket Town	0–0	2–3	0–3	2–0	7–0	1–1	1–4	4–1	0–1	5–1	2–3	2–0	0–3	4–0	4–1		1–2	2–2	1–0
Team Bury	1–0	0–5	0–1	1–2		1–2	4–1	0–3	3–4	0–3	0–3	1–3	2–3	0–3	6–3	0–1		0–4	0–0
Wivenhoe Town	2–0	2–3	2–2	1–0	1–0	3–0	2–0	1–0	4–3	2–1	1–0	2–2	2–1	4–1	2–1	6–1	3–0		2–1
Woodbridge Town	1–1	2–1	2–5	2–0	1–1	2–2	1–0	2–1	2–0	4–2	1–1	0–1	4–1	3–2	2–3	3–3	3–0	1–2	

Source: FA Full Time
Legend: Blue = home team win; Yellow = draw; Red = away team win.

=== Stadia and locations ===
Locations of Division One clubs

Team	Stadium	Capacity
A.F.C. Sudbury reserves	King's Marsh	2,500
Braintree Town reserves	Cressing Road	4,202
Cornard United	Blackhouse Lane	2,000
Debenham LC	Maitlands	1,000
Dereham Town reserves	Aldiss Park	3,000
Diss Town	Brewers Green Lane	2,500
Downham Town	Memorial Field	1,000
Ely City	Unwin Sports Ground	1,500
Great Yarmouth Town	Wellesley Recreation Ground	3,600
Halstead Town	Rosemary Lane	1,000
Haverhill Borough	New Croft (groundshare with Haverhill Rovers)	3,000
King's Lynn Town reserves	The Walks	5,733
Leiston reserves	Victory Road	2,500
March Town United	The GER Sports Ground	
Needham Market reserves	Bloomfields	4,000
Stowmarket Town	Greens Meadow	1,000
Team Bury	Ram Meadow	3,500
Wivenhoe Town	Broad Lane	2,876
Woodbridge Town	Notcutts Park	3,000
