= Dean Greygoose =

English footballer (born 1964)

Personal information
- Date of birth: 18 December 1964 (age 61)
- Place of birth: Torquay, England
- Height: 5 ft 11 in (1.80 m)
- Position: Goalkeeper

Senior career*
Years	Team	Apps	(Gls)
1982–1985	Cambridge United	26	(0)
1985	→ Lincoln City (loan)	8	(0)
1985–1986	Leyton Orient	1	(0)
1986–1987	Crystal Palace	0	(0)
1987–1993	Crewe Alexandra	205	(0)
1993–1999	Northwich Victoria	189	(0)
1999–2000	Altrincham	18	(0)
2000–2001	Chester City	2	(0)
2001–2002	Stevenage Borough	18	(0)
2002–2003	Canvey Island	0	(0)
2002–2003	King's Lynn	20	(0)
2002–2005	AFC Sudbury	87	(0)
2005–2006	Soham Town Rangers		
2006–2009	Bury Town	59	(0)
Total		633	(0)

International career
1982	England U17	2	(0)
1982	England Youth	2	(0)

Managerial career
- 2009–2010: Team Bury
- 2013–2014: Haverhill Rovers
- 2014–2018: Mildenhall Town
- 2019-2020: Eynesbury Rovers
- 2020–2023: Godmanchester Rovers
- * Club domestic league appearances and goals

Dean Greygoose (born 18 December 1964) is an English former professional footballer who played as a goalkeeper for several Football League clubs – most notably Crewe Alexandra, where he played 205 games between 1987 and 1993.

== Playing career ==
Greygoose began his long football career at Cambridge United, where he signed a professional contract in November 1982 and made his debut during the 1983-84 season. In total, he played 26 league games for Cambridge, but was mostly the team's reserve goalkeeper, behind Malcolm Webster and later Keith Branagan. Spells at Leyton Orient and Crystal Palace followed, before signing for Crewe in August 1987, where he spent six seasons as the first-choice goalkeeper.

In 1993, Greygoose was released by Crewe and joined Conference side Northwich Victoria where he spent another six seasons before leaving at the end of the 1998-99 season. He then played for several non-league clubs, including Altrincham, Chester City, Stevenage Borough, AFC Sudbury, and Soham Town Rangers. Greygoose joined Bury Town during the 2006-07 season and played for the club until retiring in July 2009.

== Coaching career ==
Greygoose also worked as a goalkeeping coach at Bury Town and was joint manager of Team Bury from 2009 until July 2010, when he joined Histon as a goalkeeping coach. In June 2012 he joined Kettering Town as assistant manager to John Beck and goalkeeping coach. He joined Haverhill Rovers as a manager in May 2013 but left in August 2014. In 2014 he was appointed manager of Mildenhall Town. The club won the Eastern Counties League Premier Division title in 2016–17, earning promotion to Division One North of the Isthmian League. Greygoose left the club in December 2018. During the 2019–20 season, he became a goalkeeping coach at Eynesbury Rovers and was appointed joint manager of the club in January 2020. In December 2020, he was appointed manager at Godmanchester Rovers. After a bad run of results, Greygoose was released by Godmanchester Rovers on 16 September 2023.
