= 2017–18 Eastern Counties Football League =

The 2017–18 season was the 75th in the history of Eastern Counties Football League, a football competition in England. It was also the last season to have a single division at Step 6.

The constitution for Step 5 and Step 6 divisions for 2017–18 was announced on 26 May 2017, and the Eastern Counties divisions constitutions were ratified at the league's AGM on 17 June 2017.

Coggeshall Town were champions, winning their first Eastern Counties Football League title and were promoted to the Isthmian League for the first time in their history. Felixstove & Walton United finished second and were promoted due to expansion of step 4 up to seven divisions.

== Premier Division ==
Eastern Counties Football League Premier Division
- Season: 2017–18
- Champions: Coggeshall Town
- Promoted: Coggeshall Town; Felixstowe & Walton United
- Relegated: Fakenham Town; Ipswich Wanderers; Wivenhoe Town
- Matches: 550
- Goals: 1,896 (3.45 per match)

The Premier Division featured 19 clubs which competed in the division last season, along with five new clubs:

- Coggeshall Town, promoted from Division One
- Haverhill Borough, promoted from Division One
- Histon, relegated from the Southern Football League
- Stowmarket Town, promoted from Division One
- Wroxham, relegated from the Isthmian League

=== League table ===
Pos	Team	Pld	W	D	L	GF	GA	GD	Pts	Promotion or relegation
1	Coggeshall Town	46	37	4	5	145	26	+119	115	Promoted to the Isthmian League (Note: 12 of the 14 runners-up at Step 5 were to have been promoted to Step 4. However, with resignations and mergers in leagues above, all fourteen runners-up were promoted.)
2	Felixstowe & Walton United	46	35	4	7	129	41	+88	109	Promoted to the Isthmian League
3	Stowmarket Town	46	33	4	9	126	51	+75	103	
4	Godmanchester Rovers	45	31	2	12	103	50	+53	95	
5	Brantham Athletic	46	26	9	11	93	62	+31	87	
6	Histon	46	25	8	13	100	62	+38	83	
7	Gorleston	46	21	11	14	99	77	+22	74	
8	Stanway Rovers	46	22	8	16	80	58	+22	74	Transferred to the Essex Senior League
9	Newmarket Town	46	22	7	17	107	74	+33	73	
10	Kirkley & Pakefield	45	19	11	15	80	69	+11	68	
11	Saffron Walden Town	46	20	7	19	82	80	+2	67	Transferred to the Essex Senior League
12	Thetford Town	46	19	9	18	84	78	+6	66	
13	Wroxham	46	18	12	16	74	70	+4	66	
14	Ely City	46	18	10	18	71	79	−8	63 (Note: Ely City were deducted one point on 11 October for a contravention of league rules.)	
15	Great Yarmouth Town	46	15	14	17	64	69	−5	59	
16	Long Melford	46	17	8	21	54	79	−25	59	
17	Walsham-le-Willows	46	16	7	23	82	100	−18	55	
18	FC Clacton	46	14	9	23	52	96	−44	51	
19	Haverhill Rovers	46	12	13	21	59	79	−20	49	
20	Haverhill Borough	46	12	4	30	66	120	−54	40 (Note: Haverhill Borough were demoted due to ground grading issues.)	Demoted to Division One North
21	Hadleigh United	46	10	4	32	50	106	−56	34	
22	Fakenham Town	44	7	4	33	28	124	−96	25	Relegated to Division One North
23	Ipswich Wanderers	45	4	9	32	33	108	−75	21	Relegated to Division One North
24	Wivenhoe Town	45	4	6	35	35	138	−103	17 (Note: Wivenhoe Town were deducted one point on 7 October for a contravention of league rules.)	Relegated to Division One South

Source: FA Full-Time
Rules for classification: 1) Points; 2) Goal difference; 3) Number of goals scored; 4) Number of matches won; 5) Head-to-head results

=== Stadia and locations ===
Locations of the Premier Division clubs

Team	Stadium	Capacity
Brantham Athletic	Brantham Leisure Centre	1,200
Coggeshall Town	West Street	
Ely City	Unwin Sports Ground	1,500
Fakenham Town	Clipbush Park	2,000
Clacton	The Rush Green Bowl	3,000
Felixstowe & Walton United	Dellwood Avenue	2,000
Godmanchester Rovers	Bearscroft Lane	1,050
Gorleston	Emerald Park	3,000
Great Yarmouth Town	Wellesley Recreation Ground	3,600
Hadleigh United	Millfield	3,000
Haverhill Borough	New Croft (artificial, groundshare with Haverhill Rovers)	3,000
Haverhill Rovers	New Croft	3,000
Histon	Bridge Road	4,300
Ipswich Wanderers	Humber Doucy Lane	1,000
Kirkley & Pakefield	Walmer Road	2,000
Long Melford	Stoneylands	
Newmarket Town	Cricket Field Road	2,750
Saffron Walden Town	Catons Lane	2,000
Stanway Rovers	Hawthorns	1,500
Stowmarket Town	Greens Meadow	1,000
Thetford Town	Mundford Road	1,500
Walsham-le-Willows	Summer Road	1,000
Wivenhoe Town	Broad Lane	2,876
Wroxham	Trafford Park	2,000

== Division One ==
Eastern Counties Football League Division One
- Season: 2017–18
- Champions: Woodbridge Town
- Promoted: Framlingham Town; Whitton United; Woodbridge Town
- Matches: 416
- Goals: 1,673 (4.02 per match)

Division One featured 17 clubs which competed in the division last season, along with four new clubs:

- Little Oakley, promoted from the Essex and Suffolk Border League
- Norwich United reserves
- Spixworth, promoted from the Anglian Combination, with a name change to Norwich CBS
- Swaffham Town, relegated from Premier Division

=== League table ===
Pos	Team	Pld	W	D	L	GF	GA	GD	Pts	Promotion
1	Woodbridge Town	40	32	5	3	136	41	+95	101	Promoted to the Premier Division
2	Framlingham Town	40	29	7	4	115	36	+79	94	Promoted to the Premier Division
3	Whitton United	40	29	2	9	132	46	+86	89	Promoted to the Premier Division
4	Swaffham Town	40	26	7	7	138	53	+85	85	Placed in Division One North
5	Braintree Town reserves	40	24	6	10	99	61	+38	78	Placed in Division One South
6	King's Lynn Town reserves	40	22	6	12	99	64	+35	72	Placed in Division One North
7	Debenham LC	39	20	7	12	69	53	+16	67	Placed in Division One North
8	Norwich CBS	39	20	5	14	93	60	+33	65	Placed in Division One North
9	Downham Town	40	15	10	15	67	63	+4	55	Placed in Division One North
10	Halstead Town	40	14	13	13	77	75	+2	55	Placed in Division One South
11	AFC Sudbury reserves	40	14	7	19	69	78	−9	49	Placed in Division One North
12	Leiston reserves	38	13	7	18	70	96	−26	46	Placed in Division One North
13	Diss Town	40	13	6	21	62	96	−34	45	Placed in Division One North
14	Holland	40	13	4	23	68	82	−14	43	Placed in Division One South
15	Little Oakley	39	11	10	18	69	97	−28	43	Placed in Division One South
16	Cornard United	40	12	5	23	58	96	−38	41	Placed in Division One North
17	March Town United	40	9	12	19	54	77	−23	39	Placed in Division One North
18	Wisbech St Mary	38	11	5	22	61	105	−44	38	Placed in Division One North
19	Norwich United reserves	39	10	7	22	46	106	−60	37	Resigned to the Anglian Combination
20	Needham Market reserves	40	6	3	31	52	149	−97	21	Placed in Division One North
21	Team Bury	40	5	2	33	39	139	−100	17	Club folded

Source: FA Full-Time
Rules for classification: 1) Points; 2) Goal difference; 3) Number of goals scored; 4) Number of matches won; 5) Head-to-head results

=== Stadia and locations ===
Locations of Division One clubs

Team	Stadium	Capacity
A.F.C. Sudbury reserves	King's Marsh	2,500
Braintree Town reserves	Cressing Road	4,202
Cornard United	Blackhouse Lane	2,000
Debenham LC	Maitlands	1,000
Diss Town	Brewers Green Lane	2,500
Downham Town	Memorial Field	1,000
Framlingham Town	Badingham Road	
Halstead Town	Rosemary Lane	1,000
Holland	Rush Green Bowl (groundshare with F.C. Clacton)	3,000
King's Lynn Town reserves	The Walks	5,733
Leiston reserves	Victory Road	2,500
Little Oakley	Memorial Ground	
March Town United	The GER Sports Ground	
Needham Market reserves	Bloomfields	4,000
Norwich CBS	the FDC	
Norwich United reserves	Plantation Park	3,000
Swaffham Town	Shoemakers Lane	
Team Bury	Ram Meadow	3,500
Whitton United	King George V Playing Fields	1,000
Wisbech St Mary	Beechings Close	
Woodbridge Town	Notcutts Park	3,000
