= 2016–17 Eastern Counties Football League =

The 2016–17 season was the 74th in the history of the Eastern Counties Football League, a football competition in England.

Mildenhall Town were champions, winning their first Eastern Counties Football League title and were promoted to the Isthmian League for the first time in their history.

== Premier Division ==
Eastern Counties Football League Premier Division
- Season: 2016–17
- Champions: Mildenhall Town
- Promoted: Mildenhall Town
- Relegated: Swaffham Town
- Matches: 420
- Goals: 1,430 (3.4 per match)

The Premier Division featured 18 clubs which competed in the division last season, along with three new clubs, promoted from the Division One:

- Ely City
- Great Yarmouth Town
- Wivenhoe Town

The following five clubs applied for promotion to Step 4: Felixstowe & Walton United, Mildenhall Town, Newmarket Town, Stanway Rovers.

=== League table ===
Pos	Team	Pld	W	D	L	GF	GA	GD	Pts	Promotion or relegation
1	Mildenhall Town	40	32	3	5	97	29	+68	99	Promoted to the Isthmian League
2	Felixstowe & Walton United	40	29	3	8	94	31	+63	90	
3	Newmarket Town	40	26	6	8	122	70	+52	84	
4	Gorleston	40	24	6	10	88	51	+37	78	
5	Great Yarmouth Town	40	20	8	12	61	47	+14	68	
6	Stanway Rovers	40	19	9	12	67	47	+20	66	
7	Thetford Town	40	18	11	11	75	46	+29	65	
8	Brantham Athletic	40	17	9	14	67	57	+10	60	
9	Saffron Walden Town	40	15	10	15	62	67	−5	55	
10	Ipswich Wanderers	40	17	4	19	67	75	−8	55	
11	Kirkley & Pakefield	40	15	9	16	73	61	+12	54	
12	Godmanchester Rovers	40	15	8	17	69	74	−5	53	
13	Ely City	40	12	11	17	63	73	−10	47	
14	Walsham-le-Willows	40	13	8	19	67	87	−20	47	
15	Fakenham Town	40	13	7	20	60	73	−13	46	
16	Haverhill Rovers	40	11	11	18	57	72	−15	44	
17	Long Melford	40	11	7	22	42	74	−32	40	
18	Hadleigh United	40	10	8	22	51	82	−31	38	
19	Wivenhoe Town	40	7	12	21	51	99	−48	33	Reprieved from relegation (Note: Wivenhoe Town and Clacton were reprieved from relegation.)
20	Clacton	40	9	4	27	52	114	−62	31	Reprieved from relegation
21	Swaffham Town	40	6	8	26	45	101	−56	26	Relegated to Division One

Source: FA Full-Time
Rules for classification: 1) Points; 2) Goal difference; 3) Number of goals scored; 4) Number of matches won; 5) Head-to-head results

=== Stadia and locations ===
Locations of the Premier Division clubs

Team	Stadium	Capacity
Brantham Athletic	Brantham Leisure Centre	1,200
Clacton	The Rush Green Bowl	3,000
Ely City	Unwin Sports Ground	1,500
Fakenham Town	Clipbush Park	2,000
Felixstowe & Walton United	Dellwood Avenue	2,000
Godmanchester Rovers	Bearscroft Lane	1,050
Gorleston	Emerald Park	3,000
Great Yarmouth Town	Wellesley Recreation Ground	3,600
Hadleigh United	Millfield	3,000
Haverhill Rovers	New Croft	3,000
Ipswich Wanderers	Humber Doucy Lane	1,000
Kirkley & Pakefield	Walmer Road	2,000
Long Melford	Stoneylands	
Mildenhall Town	Recreation Way	2,000
Newmarket Town	Cricket Field Road	2,750
Saffron Walden Town	Catons Lane	2,000
Stanway Rovers	Hawthorns	1,500
Swaffham Town	Shoemakers Lane	
Thetford Town	Mundford Road	1,500
Walsham-le-Willows	Summer Road	1,000
Wivenhoe Town	Broad Lane	2,876

== Division One ==
Eastern Counties Football League Division One
- Season: 2016–17
- Champions: Stowmarket Town
- Promoted: Coggeshall Town; Haverhill Borough; Stowmarket Town
- Matches: 420
- Goals: 1,596 (3.8 per match)

Division One featured 16 clubs which competed in the division last season, along with five new clubs:

- Coggeshall Town, promoted from Essex and Suffolk Border League
- Framlingham Town, promoted from the Suffolk and Ipswich League
- Holland, promoted from the Essex and Suffolk Border League
- Whitton United, relegated from the Premier Division
- Wisbech St Mary, promoted from the Cambridgeshire County League

=== League table ===
Pos	Team	Pld	W	D	L	GF	GA	GD	Pts	Promotion
1	Stowmarket Town	40	28	10	2	108	22	+86	93 (Note: Stowmarket Town were deducted one point on 21 December for a contravention of league rules.)	Promoted to the Premier Division
2	Coggeshall Town	40	27	9	4	127	34	+93	90	Promoted to the Premier Division
3	Haverhill Borough	40	27	7	6	116	41	+75	88	Promoted to the Premier Division
4	Woodbridge Town	40	26	5	9	126	46	+80	83	
5	Holland	40	23	8	9	105	48	+57	77	
6	Diss Town	40	21	8	11	88	60	+28	71	
7	Framlingham Town	40	20	10	10	82	62	+20	70	
8	Braintree Town reserves	40	22	3	15	72	59	+13	69	
9	Halstead Town	40	18	11	11	72	64	+8	65	
10	King's Lynn Town reserves	40	19	6	15	69	55	+14	63	
11	Whitton United	40	17	3	20	73	90	−17	54	
12	Debenham LC	40	15	8	17	58	69	−11	53	
13	Wisbech St Mary	40	15	7	18	68	76	−8	52	
14	Downham Town	40	13	12	15	74	70	+4	51	
15	Cornard United	40	13	8	19	63	72	−9	47	
16	March Town United	40	9	10	21	49	91	−42	37	
17	Team Bury	40	11	3	26	56	104	−48	36	
18	AFC Sudbury reserves	40	10	5	25	63	92	−29	35	
19	Needham Market reserves	40	6	4	30	54	151	−97	22	
20	Dereham Town reserves	40	5	4	31	36	136	−100	19	Resigned from the league
21	Leiston reserves	40	3	3	34	37	154	−117	12	

Source: FA Full-Time
Rules for classification: 1) Points; 2) Goal difference; 3) Number of goals scored; 4) Number of matches won; 5) Head-to-head results

=== Stadia and locations ===
Locations of Division One clubs

Team	Stadium	Capacity
AFC Sudbury reserves	King's Marsh	2,500
Braintree Town reserves	Cressing Road	4,202
Coggeshall Town	West Street	
Cornard United	Blackhouse Lane	2,000
Debenham LC	Maitlands	1,000
Dereham Town reserves	Aldiss Park	3,000
Diss Town	Brewers Green Lane	2,500
Downham Town	Memorial Field	1,000
Framlingham Town	Badingham Road	
Halstead Town	Rosemary Lane	1,000
Haverhill Borough	New Croft (groundshare with Haverhill Rovers)	3,000
Holland	Rush Green Bowl (groundshare with FC Clacton)	3,000
King's Lynn Town reserves	The Walks	5,733
Leiston reserves	Victory Road	2,500
March Town United	The GER Sports Ground	
Needham Market reserves	Bloomfields	4,000
Stowmarket Town	Greens Meadow	1,000
Team Bury	Ram Meadow (groundshare with Bury Town)	3,500
Whitton United	King George V Playing Fields	1,000
Wisbech St Mary	Beechings Close	
Woodbridge Town	Notcutts Park	3,000
