= Zak Brown (footballer) =

English footballer

Personal information
- Full name: Zak William Brown
- Date of birth: 6 June 2002 (age 24)
- Place of birth: Felixstowe, England
- Position: Forward

Team information
- Current team: Felixstowe & Walton United

Youth career
- –2020: Ipswich Town

Senior career*
Years	Team	Apps	(Gls)
2020–2021	Ipswich Town	0	(0)
2020	→ Leiston (loan)	4	(1)
2021–2024	Felixstowe & Walton United	86	(17)
2025	Pascoe Vale	0	(0)
2025–	Felixstowe & Walton United	0	(0)
- * Club domestic league appearances and goals as of 10:59, 5 September 2024 (UTC)

Zak William Brown (born 6 June 2002) is an English semi-professional footballer who plays as a forward for Felixstowe & Walton United.

== Early life ==
He attended Colneis Junior School in Felixstowe.

== Career ==
After coming through their youth academy, he signed his first professional contract with Ipswich Town in July 2019, with the contract lasting until summer 2021. He joined Leiston on loan in January 2020, and made four appearances for them, scoring one goal. He made his professional debut on 10 November 2020 as a second-half substitute in a 2–0 EFL Trophy defeat away to Crawley Town. In April 2021, Ipswich announced that Brown would be released at the end of the 2020–21 season following the end of his contract.

He signed for Isthmian League North Division side Felixstowe & Walton United in August 2021.

On 20 December 2024, Brown joined Pascoe Vale ahead of the 2025 Victoria Premier League 2 season.

He rejoined Felixstowe & Walton United for the start of the 2025/26 Isthmian League North Division campaign

== Personal life ==
He is the younger brother of fellow footballer Charlie Brown.

== Career statistics ==
As of match played 10 November 2020

Appearances and goals by club, season and competition
Club	Season	League			FA Cup		EFL Cup		Other		Total	
Club	Season	Division	Apps	Goals	Apps	Goals	Apps	Goals	Apps	Goals	Apps	Goals
Ipswich Town	2020–21	League One	0	0	0	0	0	0	1 (Note: Appearance in EFL Trophy)	0	1	0
Career total			0	0	0	0	0	0	1	0	1	0
