= Haverhill Borough F.C. =

Association football club in England

Coordinates: 52.087470°N 0.44748902°E

Haverhill Borough
- Full name: Haverhill Borough Football Club
- Founded: 2011
- Ground: New Croft, Haverhill
- Chairman: Stephanie Fitzpatrick
- Manager: Harry Zachariou
- 2025–26: Eastern Counties League Division One North, 7th of 20 (resigned)
Home colours	Away colours

Haverhill Borough Football Club is a football club based in Haverhill in England. They play at the New Croft.

== History ==
The club was established in 2011 as Haverhill Sports Association. The new club joined Division One of the Essex & Suffolk Border Football League and won it at the first attempt, and were promoted to the Premier Division. The following season the club entered the FA Vase for the first time, knocking out three clubs from higher divisions, before losing in the third round. They finished second in the Premier Division, earning promotion to Division One of the Eastern Counties League. In the summer of 2013 the club adopted its current name.

In the 2013–14 season the club narrowly missed out on promotion, finishing fourth in Division One. In 2015–16 they won the Division One Knock-Out Cup. The following season saw the club finish third in Division One, earning promotion to the Premier Division. Their first season in the Premier Division ended in relegation to Division One North. At the end of the 2020–21 season they were transferred to Division One South, but were moved back to Division One North the following season.

In June 2026 Haverhill Borough resigned from the Eastern Counties League, with Wivenhoe Town reprieved from relegation.

== Ground ==
The club have played at the New Croft sports ground since their establishment. The ground initially had a single pitch, which was shared with Haverhill Rovers. In 2016 an artificial pitch was opened at the sports ground, with Rovers remaining on the original pitch and Borough playing on the artificial surface.

== Honours ==
- Eastern Counties League
  - Division One Knock-Out Cup winners 2015–16
- Essex & Suffolk Border League
  - Division One champions 2011–12

== Records ==
- Best FA Cup performance: First qualifying round, 2014–15, 2017–18
- Best FA Vase performance: First round, 2014–15, 2016–17
- Record attendance: 654 vs Haverhill Rovers, FA Vase second qualifying round, 2016–17
