= Norwich United F.C. =

Football club based in Blofield, Norfolk, England

Coordinates: 52°38′19.52″N 1°27′23.36″E

Norwich United
- Full name: Norwich United Football Club
- Nickname: The Planters
- Founded: 1903
- Ground: Plantation Park, Blofield; Norfolk
- Capacity: 3,000 (100 seated)
- Chairman: John Hilditch
- Manager: Lewis Plowman
- League: Eastern Counties League Division One North
- 2025–26: Anglian Combination Premier Division, 1st of 15 (promoted)
- Website: https://www.norwichunited.co.uk/
Home colours	Away colours

Norwich United Football Club is a football club based in Blofield, Norfolk, England. Affiliated to the Norfolk County FA, they are currently members of the Eastern Counties League Division One North and play at Plantation Park.

== History ==
The club was established in 1903 as Poringland and District, and initially played in the Norwich & District Business House League. In 1965 they joined Division Three of the Anglian Combination, which they went on to win at the first attempt. The club won the Norfolk Junior Cup in 1978–79, defeating Bradenham Wanderers 5–2 in the final. In 1980–81 they won the Norfolk Junior Cup again, beating Wroxham reserves in the final, and also won the Junior League Cup, defeating Acle 3–2. In 1983–84 the club won the Anglian Combination Senior Cup, beating Bradenham Wanderers 2–1. In 1987 the club was renamed Norwich United.

In 1987–88 Norwich United were Anglian Combination Premier Division runners-up, before going on to win the title the following season, earning promotion to Division One of the Eastern Counties League. In their first season in Division One they finished as runners-up, but could not be promoted due to the inadequate facilities at Gothic. The following season saw them win the division; having relocated to Plantation Park, the club were promoted to the Premier Division. They won the League Cup in 1991–92. The club were relegated back to Division One at the end of the 1993–94 season after finishing bottom of the division. The club were Division One champions in 2001–02, securing promotion back to the Premier Division.

Norwich United were Premier Division champions and League Cup winners in 2014–15, but opted not to take promotion to the Isthmian League. However, after retaining the league title the following season, they were promoted to Division One North of the Isthmian League. In 2017–18 the club won the Norfolk Senior Cup, defeating Downham Town 4–2 after extra time in the final. However, they also finished bottom of Division One North and were relegated back to the Premier Division of the Eastern Counties League. They withdrew from the league shortly after the start of the 2023–24 season following the departure of several players from the club and a 12–0 defeat at home to Thetford Town (equalling a league record away win).

The club joined the Premier Division of the Anglian Combination prior to the 2024–25 season. In 2025–26 they were Premier Division champions, earning promotion to Division One North of the Eastern Counties League.

== Ground ==
The club initially played at the Poringland Memorial Playing Field, where they remained until moving to Heartsease Lane – the former ground of Gothic – in 1985 in order to achieve senior status. They relocated to Plantation Park in Blofield in 1991 in order to meet the ground grading requirements of the Eastern Counties League's Premier Division.

Plantation Park has a stand on one side of the pitch, which includes a seated section in the centre and terracing on either side.

== Honours ==
- Eastern Counties League
  - Premier Division Champions 2014–15, 2015–16
  - Division One champions 1990–91, 2001–02
  - League Cup winners 1991–92, 2014–15
- Anglian Combination
  - Premier Division champions 1988–89, 2025–26
  - Division Three champions 1965–66
  - Senior Cup winners 1983–84
  - Junior Cup winners 1980–81
- Norfolk Senior Cup
  - Winners 2017–18
- Norfolk Junior Cup
  - Winners 1978–79, 1980–81

== Records ==
- Best FA Cup performance: Third qualifying round, 2021–22
- Best FA Trophy performance: Preliminary round, 2016–17, 2017–18
- Best FA Vase performance: Fifth round, 2015–16
- Record attendance: 401 vs Wroxham, Eastern Counties League, 1991–92
- Most appearances: Tim Sayer
- Most goals: M. Money

== See also ==
- Norwich United F.C. players
- Norwich United F.C. managers
