= Wivenhoe Town F.C. =

English football club

Coordinates: 51°52′25.97″N 0°58′13.09″E

Wivenhoe Town
- Full name: Wivenhoe Town Football Club
- Nickname: The Dragons
- Founded: 1925 (as Wivenhoe Rangers)
- Ground: Broad Lane, Wivenhoe
- Capacity: 2,876 (161 seated)
- Chairman: Mo Osman
- Manager: Craig Gillam
- League: Eastern Counties League Division One North
- 2025–26: Eastern Counties League Division One North, 19th of 20
Home colours	Away colours

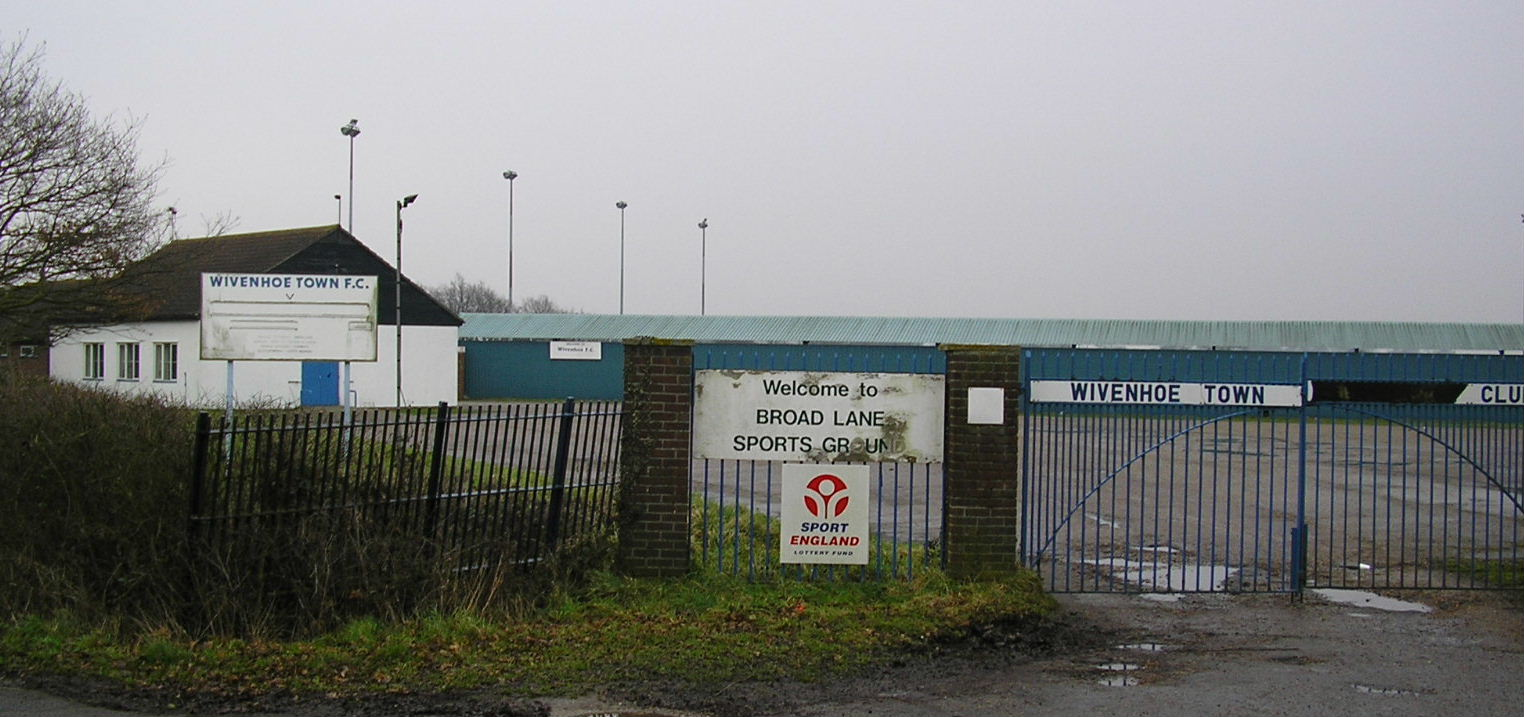
Broad Lane Sports Ground

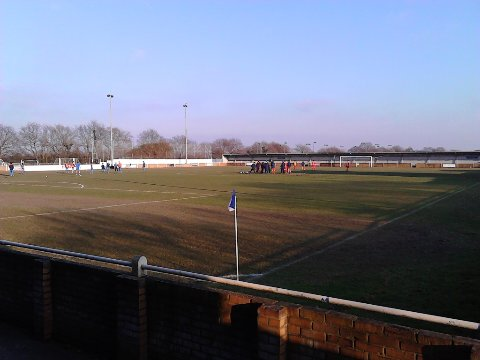
The pitch at Broad Lane

Wivenhoe Town F.C. is an English football club based in Wivenhoe, Essex. The club are currently members of the Eastern Counties League Division One North and play at Broad Lane.

== History ==
The club was established as Wivenhoe Rangers by Frank Slaughter and students from Colchester Grammar School in 1925. They joined the Brightlingsea & District League in 1929. After finishing third in 1929–30 and second in 1931–32, they won the league without losing a match in 1932–33. They won the league again in 1936–37, together with the League Challenge Cup, the League Knock-out Cup and the Amos Charity Cup, winning the final against Tollesbury 8–1 in front of a record attendance of 1,500. The league title was won once more in 1947–48, with the Knock-out Cup also won again.

They switched to the Colchester and East Essex League, winning the Premier Division in 1952–53 as well as the League Challenge Cup. In 1955–56 they won the league again, together with the Knock-Out Cup, and also reached the final of the Essex Junior Cup, losing 3–2 to Heybridge Swifts.

After being relegated, the club returned to the Premier Division as Division One champions in 1959–60, but were immediately relegated again, and later dropped into Division Two. In 1968–69 they finished runners-up and returned to Division One. The following season they won the division and were promoted back to the Premier Division.

After finishing runners-up to Mersea Island in 1970–71, the club were promoted to Division Two of the Essex & Suffolk Border League. They won the division in their first season, and also claimed the Division One title the following season. In 1974 the club were renamed Wivenhoe Town.

In 1977–78 the club bought a carrot field on Broad Lane the outskirts of Wivenhoe for £2,500 to move back to the town, having most recently been playing at the University of Essex in nearby Colchester. The following season they won the Premier Division, and were promoted to the Essex Senior League. After finishing runners-up three times in seven seasons, the club were promoted to Division Two North of the Isthmian League at the end of the 1985–86 season. In 1987–88 they won the title, and were promoted to Division One, also winning the Essex Senior Trophy.

In 1989–90 the club won Division One, accumulating 100 points, and were promoted to the Premier Division. A new record attendance of 1,992 was set for the visit of Runcorn in the FA Trophy. In 1993–94 the club experience financial difficulties, needing to raise £150,000 to buy back the ground and finished bottom of the Premier Division and were relegated. A second successive relegation followed. In 2004 the club switched to the Division One East of the Southern League. In 2005–06 they reached the play-off final, but lost 2–1 to Stamford. The following season they were transferred back to Division One of the Isthmian League. In 2007–08 they finished bottom of the league, and were relegated to the Premier Division of the Eastern Counties League.

During the 2008–09 season former West Ham player Julian Dicks was appointed manager, but he resigned in June 2009. In 2009–10 the club finished bottom of the Premier Division with only eight points, but avoided relegation after two clubs (Harwich & Parkeston and King's Lynn reserves) withdrew from the league and one club (Needham Market) were promoted. However, they were relegated to Division One at the end of the 2014–15 season. The following season they won Division One and were promoted back to the Premier Division. However, in 2017–18 Wivenhoe finished bottom of the Premier Division and were relegated to Division One South. They were transferred to Division One North in 2023.

== Ground ==
The club moved to their current home of Broad Lane in 1978, following time at a number of grounds, including Claude Watchman's Meadow, Vine Farm, Broomfield, Spion Kop and the King George V Playing Fields.

== Honours ==
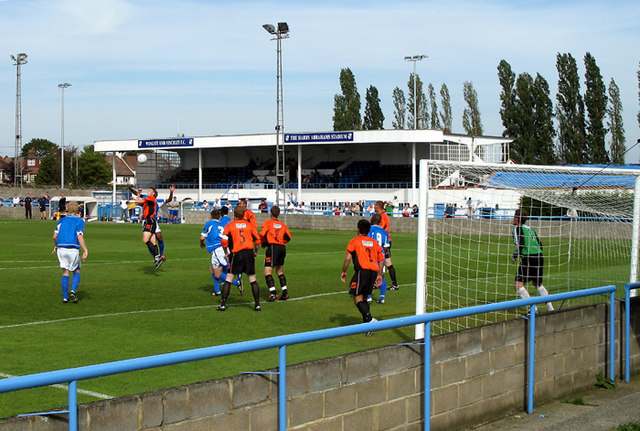
Wivenhoe (in orange) playing against Wingate & Finchley.

- Isthmian League
  - Division One champions 1989–90
  - Division Two North champions 1987–88
- Eastern Counties League
  - Division One champions 2015–16
- Brightlingsea & District League
  - Champions 1932–33, 1936–37, 1947–48
  - League Knock-Out Cup winners 1937, 1948
  - League Challenge Cup winners 1937
- Colchester and East Essex League
  - Premier Division champions 1952–53, 1955–56
  - Division One champions 1959–60, 1969–70
  - League Challenge Cup winners 1953
  - League Knock-Out Cup winners 1956
- Essex & Suffolk Border League
  - Premier Division champions 1978–79
  - Division One champions 1972–73
  - Division Two champions 1971–72
- Essex Senior Trophy
  - Winners 1988

== Records ==
- Best FA Cup performance: Fourth qualifying round replay, 1989–90
- Best FA Trophy performance: Third round proper, 1990–91
- Best FA Vase performance: Fifth round replay, 1995–96
- Attendance: 1,992 vs Runcorn, FA Trophy first round, February 1990
- Appearances: Keith Bain, 538
