= Swaffham Town F.C. =

Association football club in England

Coordinates: 52°38′45.42″N 0°40′52.59″E

Swaffham Town
- Full name: Swaffham Town Football Club
- Nickname: The Pedlars
- Founded: 1892
- Ground: Shoemakers Lane, Swaffham
- Capacity: 1,000
- Chairman: Aaron Jasper
- Manager: Callum Madigan
- League: Anglian Combination Division One
- 2025–26: Anglian Combination Premier Division, 15tb of 15 (relegated)
Home colours	Away colours

Swaffham Town Football Club is a football club based in Swaffham, Norfolk, England. The club are currently members of the Anglian Combination Division One and play at Shoemakers Lane. They are affiliated to the Norfolk County FA.

== History ==
The club was established in 1892, reaching the final of the Norfolk Junior Cup two years later. In 1935 they joined the Norfolk & Suffolk League, but left after a single season. They won the Norfolk Junior Cup in 1951 and again the following season. In 1959 they moved to the Shoemakers Lane ground, having purchased the site for £250.

The club joined the Anglian Combination and won Division Two in 1973–74. In 1990 they were promoted to Division One of the Eastern Counties League. After winning the division in 2001–02 they were promoted to the Premier Division. However, they finished bottom of the Premier Division in their first season, and were relegated back to Division One. The club remained in Division One until the end of the 2014–15 season, when they were promoted after finishing as runners-up.

In 2016–17 Swaffham finished bottom of the Premier Division, and were relegated to Division One. They were moved to Division One North as part of league reorganisation in 2018, and went on to win the Division One North title in 2018–19, earning promotion back to the Premier Division. However, in 2021–22 the club was again relegated to Division One North and 2023–24 saw them finish in the relegation zone and avoid the drop only due to other clubs withdrawing. The reprieve was short-lived as Swaffham finished bottom and were relegated to the Anglian Combination in 2024–25 and suffered back-to-back relegations by finishing bottom of the Anglian Combination Premier Division in 2025-26.

== Colours ==
The club's colours are black and white striped shirts and black shorts. Originally, the club wore green, which it changed for red and white stripes in 1910.

== Honours ==
- Eastern Counties League
  - Division One champions 2000–01
  - Division One North champions 2018–19
- Anglian Combination
  - Division Two champions 1973–74
- Norfolk Junior Cup
  - Winners 1950–51, 1951–52

== Records ==
- Best FA Vase performance: Third round, 2018–19
- Attendance: 250 vs Downham Town, Eastern Counties League Cup, 3 September 1991
