= Felixstowe & Walton United F.C. =

Association football club in England

Coordinates: 51°58′15″N 1°21′21″E

Felixstowe & Walton United
- Full name: Felixstowe & Walton United Football Club
- Nickname: The Seasiders
- Founded: 2000
- Ground: Dellwood Avenue, Felixstowe
- Capacity: 2,160 (200 seated)
- Chairman: Tony Barnes
- Manager: Jack Ainsley & Stuart Ainsley (joint managers)
- League: Isthmian League North Division
- 2025–26: Isthmian League North Division, 2nd of 22
- Website: http://www.felixstowefootball.co.uk
| Home colours | Away colours |

Felixstowe and Walton United Football Club is a football club based in Felixstowe, Suffolk, England. Formed in 2000 by a merger of Felixstowe Port & Town and Walton United, the club are currently members of the Isthmian League North Division and play at Dellwood Avenue.

== History ==
=== Felixstowe Port & Town ===
Felixstowe F.C. were officially formed in 1890, although there are records of the club dating back to 1888. They were founder members of the Ipswich & District League in 1896. In 1900 they were relegated to Division Two of the league, and left at the end of the following season. They rejoined Division One in 1902 under the name Felixstowe Town and were league champions in 1910–11. They left the league again at the end of the following season, but returned in 1923. They won their second title in 1936–37.

After World War II the club merged with neighbours Walton United to form Felixstowe United, before reverting to the name Felixstowe Town in 1952. They won the league for a third time in 1957–58 and a fourth in 1964–65. In 1966 they switched to the Essex & Suffolk Border League. In 1966–67 they won the Suffolk Senior Cup with a 3–2 over Oulton Broad. They won it for a second time in 1974–75. After finishing as Essex & Suffolk Border League Premier Division runners-up in 1974–75 and 1975–76, the club joined the Eastern Counties League in 1976. In 1996 the club was renamed Felixstowe Port & Town.

=== Walton United ===
Walton United were established in 1895 and joined Division Two of the Ipswich & District League in 1901, but left after a single season. They joined the amateur version of the league in 1912. They won the league title in 1920–21 and in 1922 they were renamed Walton & Felixstowe, before reverting to their original name a year later. They won a second title in 1925–26. In 1947 they merged with Felixstowe Town, but were reformed in 1950 and rejoined the Ipswich & District League (later the Suffolk & Ipswich League). By 1979 they had dropped into Division Four, but after several promotions they returned to the top division in 1994. They won the Suffolk Senior Cup in 1998–99.

=== Merged club ===
The two clubs reunited in 2000 to establish the modern club, taking Port & Town's place in the Eastern Counties League Premier Division. However, at the end of the 2001–02 season they finished twenty-first out of twenty-two clubs, and were relegated to Division One. They returned to the Premier Division after as finishing runners-up in Division One in 2005–06. In 2016–17 the club were runners-up in the Premier Division. They were runners-up again the following season, earning promotion to the North Division of the Isthmian League. The 2021–22 season saw them finish fifth in the division, qualifying for the promotion play-offs. However, they lost 3–1 to Canvey Island in the semi-finals. In 2023–24 the club finished third in the division, going on to lose their play-off semi-final against Bowers & Pitsea on penalties.

In 2024–25 Felixstowe won the Suffolk Premier Cup, beating Leiston on penalties in the final. They were also runners-up in the North Division before losing their play-off semi-final 3–1 to Brightlingsea Regent.

== Current squad ==
As of 12 July 2025

Note: Flags indicate national team as defined under FIFA eligibility rules; some limited exceptions apply. Players may hold more than one non-FIFA nationality.

| Pos. | Nation | Player |
|---|---|---|
| GK | ENG | Harry Wright |
| DF | ENG | Jack Ainsley |
| DF | ENG | Ollie Brown |
| DF | ENG | Hugh Cullum |
| DF | ENG | Toby Stevenson |
| DF | ENG | Tom Warren |
| DF | ENG | Joe Whight |
| MF | ENG | Noel Aitkens |
| MF | ENG | Ethan Garcia |

| Pos. | Nation | Player |
|---|---|---|
| MF | ENG | Josh Hitter |
| MF | ENG | Billy Holland (captain) |
| MF | ENG | Jacob Lay |
| FW | ENG | Zak Brown |
| FW | ENG | Ollie Canfer |
| FW | ENG | Sam Ford |
| FW | ENG | Dan Gilchrist |
| FW | ENG | Josh Mayhew |

The Isthmian League North Division does not use a squad numbering system.

== Honours ==
=== Felixstowe & Walton United ===
- Suffolk Premier Cup
  - Winners 2024–25

=== Felixstowe Port & Town ===
- Suffolk & Ipswich League
  - Champions 1910–11, 1936–37, 1957–58, 1964–65
- Suffolk Senior Cup
  - Winners 1966–67, 1974–75

=== Walton United ===
- Suffolk & Ipswich League
  - Champions 1920–21, 1925–26
- Suffolk Senior Cup
  - Winners 1998–99

== Records ==
- Best FA Cup performance: Third qualifying round, 2016–17
- Best FA Trophy performance: Second round, 2020–21, 2021–22, 2024–25
- Best FA Vase performance: Second round, 2011–12, 2016–17
- Record attendance: 2,350 vs Ipswich Town, friendly match, 1 July 2023

== See also ==
- Felixstowe & Walton United F.C. players
- Felixstowe & Walton United F.C. managers
