= Team Bury F.C. =

Former association football club in England

Coordinates: 52°14′55.96″N 0°43′15.81″E

Team Bury
- Full name: Team Bury Football Club
- Nickname(s): The Blues
- Founded: 2005
- Dissolved: 2018
- Ground: Ram Meadow, Bury St Edmunds
Home colours

Team Bury Football Club was a football club based in Bury St Edmunds, Suffolk. Consisting of players largely drawn from the West Suffolk College Football Academy, they were a feeder club and reserve team for Bury Town.

== History ==
The club was established in 2005 under the name West Suffolk College F.C. as the team was formed by students at the West Suffolk College Sports Academy. They joined Division Two of the Essex and Suffolk Border League and finished as Division Two runners-up in their first season, earning promotion to Division One. The club went on to win the Division One title in 2006–07 and were promoted to the Premier Division, after which they were renamed Team Bury following a move to Bury Town's Ram Meadow ground. In 2008–09 the club finished second in the Premier Division, and were accepted into Division One of the Eastern Counties League. In 2009–10 the club won the Suffolk Senior Cup, beating Capel Plough 2–0 in the final.

Team Bury finished bottom of Division One in 2017–18, and folded in July 2018.

== Ground ==
In 2007 the club relocated from the Gainsborough Sports Centre in Ipswich and began playing at Bury Town's Ram Meadow ground.

== Honours ==
- Essex & Suffolk Border League
  - Division One champions 2006–07
- Suffolk Senior Cup
  - Winners 2010

== Records ==
- Best FA Cup performance: Preliminary round, 2010–11
- Best FA Vase performance: Second round, 2011–12
