= Godmanchester Rovers F.C. =

Association football club in England

Coordinates: 52.309167°N 0.16050071°W

Godmanchester Rovers
- Full name: Godmanchester Rovers Football Club
- Nickname: Goddy
- Founded: 1911
- Ground: Bearscroft Lane, Godmanchester
- Chairman: Richard Cosbey
- Manager: Seb Hayes
- League: United Counties League Premier Division South
- 2024–25: United Counties League Premier Division South, 19th of 19
- Website: http://godmanchesterroversfc.co.uk
Home colours	Away colours

Godmanchester Rovers Football Club is a football club based in Godmanchester, Cambridgeshire, England. They are currently members of the United Counties League Premier Division South and play at Bearscroft Lane.

== History ==
Established in 1911, the club won the Hunts Junior Cup. They played in the Huntingdonshire League for many years before joining the Cambridgeshire League. They won the Hunts Junior Cup again in 1988–89, and in 1992 were promoted to the top division of the Cambridgeshire League. In 1994–95 they won the League Cup, retaining it for the next two seasons. However, they were relegated to the Senior Division in 2000.

With the club about to move into a new ground, they made a speculative application to join the Eastern Counties League in 2002. Despite being in the second tier of the Cambridgeshire League, the club were successful. They finished bottom of the division in 2004–05, but were not relegated as the league was understrength in terms of numbers. In 2011–12 the club won Division One on goal difference to earn promotion to the Premier Division, and also won the Division One Knock-out Cup, defeating Whitton United 1–0 in the final. In 2014–15 the club finished as runners-up in the Premier Division and won the Hunts Senior Cup. The 2015–16 they were Premier Division runners-up for a second successive season.

In 2018–19 Godmanchester won Hunts Senior Cup for a second time, beating St Neots Town 6–0 in the final, and the Hinchingbrooke Cup, defeating Pinchbeck United 4–2 on penalties after a 3–3 draw. At the end of the 2020–21 season the club were transferred to the Premier Division South of the United Counties League. In 2022–23 they won the Hinchingbrooke Cup for a second time, beating Stotfold 1–0 in the final.

== Ground ==
Prior to their move to Bearscroft Lane the club played at Judith's Field on London Road, which was an open recreation ground with a pavilion. In 2002 they moved to their current ground, located a few hundred yards from their previous home. An artificial pitch was installed in 2025.

== Honours ==
- Eastern Counties League
  - Division One champions 2011–12
  - Division One Knock-Out Cup winners 2011–12
- Cambridgeshire League
  - League Cup winners 1994–95, 1995–96, 1996–97
- Hunts Senior Cup
  - Winners 2014–15, 2018–19
- Hinchingbrooke Cup
  - Winners 2018–19, 2022–23

== Records ==
- Best FA Cup performance: First qualifying round, 2009–10
- Best FA Vase performance: Fourth round, 2018–19
- Record attendance: 252 vs Sporting Khalsa, FA Vase Fourth round, 5 January 2019

== See also ==
- Godmanchester Rovers F.C. players
- Godmanchester Rovers F.C. managers
