= 2012–13 Eastern Counties Football League =

The 2012–13 season was the 71st in the history of Eastern Counties Football League a football competition in England.

Dereham Town were crowned champions on 27 April 2013 after a 5–0 win over FC Clacton and were promoted to the Isthmian League for the first time in their history.

== Premier Division ==
Eastern Counties Football League Premier Division
- Season: 2012–13
- Champions: Dereham Town
- Promoted: Dereham Town
- Matches: 380
- Goals: 1,251 (3.29 per match)

The Premier Division featured 18 clubs which competed in the division last season, along with two new clubs, promoted from Division One:

- Godmanchester Rovers
- Thetford Town
- For this season only, the FA were to promote a second club from two of the following six Step 5 leagues: Combined Counties League, Eastern Counties League, Essex Senior League, Kent League, Spartan South Midlands League and the Sussex County League. This was to fulfil the expansion of the Isthmian League Divisions One North and South from 22 to 24 clubs each. The two clubs were to be promoted on a points per game basis, and the two runners-up with the best PPG were VCD Athletic (Kent Football League) and Guernsey (Combined Counties League). Three others – Aylesbury United (Spartan South Midlands League), Redhill (Sussex County League) and Barkingside (Essex Senior League) – were also confirmed as promoted by the FA on 17 May, due to resignations and non-promotions elsewhere.
- From this league, only Brantham Athletic, Dereham Town, Haverhill Rovers, Stanway Rovers and Wisbech Town applied for promotion. Brantham later withdrew their application, and Wisbech withdrew theirs after securing the runners-up position at the end of the season.

=== League table ===
Pos	Team	Pld	W	D	L	GF	GA	GD	Pts	Promotion
1	Dereham Town	38	28	3	7	85	35	+50	87	Promoted to the Isthmian League
2	Wisbech Town	38	25	8	5	85	40	+45	83	Transferred to the United Counties League
3	Gorleston	38	23	8	7	91	37	+54	77	
4	Brantham Athletic	38	22	7	9	85	50	+35	73	
5	Godmanchester Rovers	38	19	10	9	76	49	+27	67	
6	Walsham-le-Willows	38	19	8	11	71	59	+12	65	
7	Mildenhall Town	38	19	7	12	66	54	+12	64	
8	Hadleigh United	38	18	7	13	67	52	+15	61	
9	Stanway Rovers	38	17	10	11	49	39	+10	61	
10	Haverhill Rovers	38	16	7	15	73	59	+14	55	
11	Ely City	38	15	7	16	71	63	+8	52	
12	Kirkley & Pakefield	38	13	13	12	57	68	−11	52	
13	Norwich United	38	14	6	18	55	52	+3	48	
14	Felixstowe & Walton United	38	13	6	19	54	69	−15	45	
15	Woodbridge Town	38	11	8	19	52	72	−20	41	
16	Cambridge Regional College	38	9	8	21	56	83	−27	35	
17	Diss Town	38	7	10	21	43	82	−39	31	
18	Wivenhoe Town	38	6	8	24	30	85	−55	26	
19	Thetford Town	38	6	6	26	41	85	−44	24	
20	Clacton	38	4	5	29	44	118	−74	17	

Source: fchd
Rules for classification: 1) points; 2) goal difference; 3) number of goals scored.

=== Results ===
Home \ Away	BRA	CRC	FCC	DER	DIS	ELY	FEL	GOD	GOR	HAD	HAV	KIR	MIL	NOR	STA	THE	WAL	WIS	WIV	WOO
Brantham Athletic		4–0	7–0	1–0	1–1	1–1	0–3	5–0	1–1	1–3	3–2	1–1	5–1	2–1	0–1	6–3	4–3	2–1	1–1	4–1
Cambridge Regional College	2–4		0–3	0–2	1–4	2–2	3–2	1–1	0–2	2–0	3–4	1–2	1–1	0–5	1–3	4–0	1–3	1–2	2–0	4–1
Clacton	0–4	2–2		0–4	0–2	2–5	2–2	1–6	0–3	1–4	3–2	0–1	0–3	0–2	2–2	1–1	3–2	1–2	2–1	1–2
Dereham Town	3–0	4–0	5–0		4–1	3–2	2–1	1–0	2–1	2–1	1–0	4–1	1–4	0–1	2–0	4–2	5–0	2–3	3–0	1–0
Diss Town	1–4	2–5	3–2	1–1		2–2	0–1	1–1	1–1	1–1	0–2	1–2	2–4	1–4	2–0	2–1	0–2	2–6	0–0	0–1
Ely City	1–2	2–1	4–2	1–2	2–1		4–0	2–3	2–0	1–3	2–1	2–2	1–2	2–0	1–0	4–1	1–1	1–2	4–1	0–2
Felixstowe & Walton United	3–3	3–3	4–1	0–2	2–0	2–0		0–2	0–2	0–4	3–2	3–3	1–1	0–2	0–1	0–2	1–2	1–0	2–0	2–1
Godmanchester Rovers	1–0	2–3	6–0	2–1	3–0	3–2	3–2		0–0	2–2	3–2	3–1	4–0	0–2	1–2	2–3	2–0	0–2	9–0	1–1
Gorleston	0–2	6–1	10–2	2–0	5–1	8–1	4–1	1–2		1–0	3–2	1–1	1–1	5–1	3–0	2–0	0–0	2–3	1–1	5–2
Hadleigh United	0–1	2–1	2–1	4–1	2–1	2–0	0–1	1–3	2–0		1–0	2–3	0–1	2–1	1–1	4–2	0–2	4–1	0–0	1–1
Haverhill Rovers	1–2	2–1	2–1	1–2	2–2	2–0	3–1	5–1	0–3	2–2		5–0	1–3	2–2	0–2	4–4	1–2	0–3	3–1	3–0
Kirkley & Pakefield	0–2	3–0	2–2	0–3	1–1	0–4	1–1	2–2	0–3	4–3	0–2		0–3	2–0	2–0	3–0	2–3	1–3	3–1	2–1
Mildenhall Town	0–1	2–0	4–1	1–3	5–2	1–1	3–2	1–2	1–2	1–2	0–0	4–3		2–1	1–2	4–2	0–3	0–3	4–0	2–1
Norwich United	3–1	0–2	2–1	0–1	0–3	1–3	3–0	1–1	1–2	2–0	0–1	0–1	1–2		0–2	1–2	2–1	0–0	4–0	1–1
Stanway Rovers	1–0	1–1	2–1	2–2	1–1	2–1	3–0	0–1	2–2	0–1	0–0	1–2	2–0	3–2		4–0	0–1	0–0	0–0	3–1
Thetford Town	1–1	0–2	1–0	1–1	0–1	1–2	0–1	0–2	1–2	1–3	1–2	1–1	0–1	0–1	0–1		1–2	1–5	1–1	2–0
Walsham-le-Willows	1–4	3–2	4–3	0–3	2–0	2–0	1–0	1–1	2–4	4–2	1–5	0–0	1–1	2–2	1–1	3–0		1–3	7–0	3–0
Wisbech Town	4–2	2–2	3–1	0–1	6–0	1–0	2–0	0–0	0–2	3–1	2–2	3–3	1–0	2–2	3–1	4–1	1–1		3–1	3–1
Wivenhoe Town	0–3	0–0	2–0	1–4	3–0	0–6	3–6	2–0	1–0	2–4	1–3	0–0	0–1	2–1	0–1	0–1	1–3	0–1		3–0
Woodbridge Town	4–0	2–1	5–2	1–3	2–0	2–2	1–3	1–1	0–1	1–1	0–2	2–2	1–1	1–3	3–2	4–3	3–1	0–2	2–1	

Source: Mitoo
Legend: Blue = home team win; Yellow = draw; Red = away team win.

== Division One ==
Eastern Counties Football League Division One
- Season: 2012–13
- Champions: Cambridge University Press
- Promoted: Brightlingsea Regent; Newmarket Town
- Matches: 306
- Goals: 1,161 (3.79 per match)

Division One featured 14 clubs which competed in the division last season, along with four new clubs:

- Braintree Town reserves
- Great Yarmouth Town, relegated from Premier Division
- Newmarket Town, relegated from the Premier Division
- Saffron Walden Town, which skipped the previous season

Newmarket Town achieved promotion to the Premier Division on the 13 April 2013. Cambridge University Press withdrew from the league on April 6, 2013.

=== League table ===
Pos	Team	Pld	W	D	L	GF	GA	GD	Pts	Promotion
1	Cambridge University Press	34	25	7	2	94	32	+62	82	Resigned to the Cambridgeshire County League
2	Newmarket Town	34	24	4	6	84	34	+50	76	Promoted to the Premier Division
3	Brightlingsea Regent	34	22	6	6	90	29	+61	72	Promoted to the Premier Division
4	Ipswich Wanderers	34	18	9	7	67	38	+29	63	
5	Fakenham Town	34	19	6	9	62	37	+25	63	
6	Saffron Walden Town	34	17	11	6	73	32	+41	62	
7	Whitton United	34	17	6	11	87	46	+41	57	
8	Braintree Town reserves	34	18	3	13	86	65	+21	57	
9	Swaffham Town	34	17	3	14	76	55	+21	54	
10	Great Yarmouth Town	34	15	7	12	70	64	+6	52	
11	Halstead Town	34	15	4	15	70	63	+7	49	
12	Team Bury	34	13	6	15	62	72	−10	45	
13	Long Melford	34	8	8	18	46	81	−35	31 (Note: Long Melford were deducted one point.)	
14	March Town United	34	8	5	21	38	84	−46	28 (Note: March Town United were deducted one point.)	
15	Debenham LC	34	8	3	23	57	91	−34	27	
16	Downham Town	34	8	3	23	41	84	−43	27	
17	Stowmarket Town	34	5	4	25	41	100	−59	19	
18	Cornard United	34	1	1	32	17	154	−137	4	

Source: fchd
Rules for classification: 1) points; 2) goal difference; 3) number of goals scored.

=== Results ===
Home \ Away	BRA	BRI	CAM	COR	DEB	DOW	FAK	GYT	HAL	IPS	LOM	MAR	NEW	SAF	STO	SWA	TBU	WHI
Braintree Town reserves		0–2	2–3	5–0	2–1	6–2	1–0	5–2	3–4	1–2	3–0	1–3	3–2	2–2	1–0	1–3	8–2	2–1
Brightlingsea Regent	2–3		1–0	3–0	6–2	2–2	1–1	1–2	5–1	4–2	3–1	1–2	2–0	1–1	4–0	2–1	2–1	2–0
Cambridge University Press	3–0	1–1		9–0	3–1	3–0	1–1	2–0	2–1	0–2	2–0	3–1	2–2	2–2	3–0	2–1	8–2	2–2
Cornard United	0–4	0–5	2–5		1–2	0–4	0–4	0–5	0–2	0–4	2–3	1–2	0–4	0–9	1–2	0–4	2–2	0–7
Debenham LC	2–6	0–4	0–4	14–0		1–4	1–2	6–4	2–1	1–1	4–0	2–2	1–2	0–2	1–1	1–0	1–2	1–3
Downham Town	4–2	1–1	0–1	3–1	4–1		0–4	2–1	0–2	1–2	1–3	2–3	1–3	1–1	3–2	0–2	0–4	0–3
Fakenham Town	3–2	2–1	0–0	4–0	1–2	2–0		1–1	0–3	1–1	5–0	3–0	0–2	1–3	2–0	2–1	3–0	1–0
Great Yarmouth Town	1–3	1–1	3–4	3–1	7–4	2–0	3–0		3–3	0–0	0–0	1–3	2–3	1–1	2–1	2–1	0–1	4–2
Halstead Town	2–3	0–2	0–1	7–0	3–0	4–1	2–1	2–3		0–2	6–0	3–0	3–4	1–0	2–1	1–1	1–3	0–5
Ipswich Wanderers	2–3	0–4	1–2	0–1	3–0	6–1	1–2	2–1	3–1		2–1	2–0	0–1	3–0	4–2	2–2	2–2	1–0
Long Melford	1–8	0–6	2–5	5–1	5–0	2–1	1–3	1–2	2–2	1–2		0–0	0–4	1–1	2–2	2–1	1–1	1–1
March Town United	1–1	1–6	1–2	2–1	2–0	1–2	1–2	1–2	0–3	0–4	0–3		0–1	2–3	1–0	1–6	0–6	3–3
Newmarket Town	1–1	0–1	0–2	4–0	4–2	1–0	4–4	5–1	3–0	1–1	1–0	3–0		0–1	7–0	4–0	4–1	2–0
Saffron Walden Town	3–0	1–0	1–1	6–1	1–0	3–0	0–1	0–1	4–0	1–1	2–1	4–1	1–2		6–0	3–1	4–0	0–0
Stowmarket Town	4–0	0–6	0–6	11–1	2–1	4–0	0–2	1–2	1–4	0–3	2–5	2–2	0–4	2–2		0–5	0–2	1–7
Swaffham Town	3–1	0–5	0–3	3–1	6–1	5–0	3–2	2–5	4–1	2–2	4–0	2–0	1–2	1–0	2–0		4–1	4–2
Team Bury	3–1	0–2	2–3	1–0	1–2	3–1	0–2	3–1	2–2	1–3	2–2	2–1	1–2	2–2	4–0	2–1		2–3
Whitton United	1–2	3–1	1–4	6–0	2–0	3–0	2–0	2–2	2–3	1–1	2–0	7–1	3–2	2–3	3–0	4–0	4–1	

Source: Mitoo
Legend: Blue = home team win; Yellow = draw; Red = away team win.
