= 2011–12 Eastern Counties Football League =

The 2011–12 season was the 70th in the history of Eastern Counties Football League a football competition in England.

Wroxham were champions, winning their eighth Eastern Counties Football League title and were promoted to the Isthmian League for the first time in their history.

== Premier Division ==
Eastern Counties Football League Premier Division
- Season: 2011–12
- Champions: Wroxham
- Promoted: Wroxham
- Relegated: Great Yarmouth Town; Newmarket Town
- Matches: 420
- Goals: 1,426 (3.4 per match)

The Premier Division featured 19 clubs which competed in the division last season, along with two new clubs, promoted from Division One:

- Diss Town
- Gorleston

=== League table ===
| Pos | Team | Pld | W | D | L | GF | GA | GD | Pts | Promotion or relegation |
|---|---|---|---|---|---|---|---|---|---|---|
| 1 | Wroxham | 40 | 28 | 6 | 6 | 94 | 34 | +60 | 90 | Promoted to the Isthmian League |
| 2 | Ely City | 40 | 25 | 7 | 8 | 81 | 60 | +21 | 82 | |
| 3 | Brantham Athletic | 40 | 23 | 7 | 10 | 86 | 49 | +37 | 76 | |
| 4 | Wisbech Town | 40 | 23 | 6 | 11 | 84 | 55 | +29 | 75 | |
| 5 | Stanway Rovers | 40 | 21 | 7 | 12 | 86 | 57 | +29 | 70 | |
| 6 | Woodbridge Town | 40 | 19 | 8 | 13 | 86 | 61 | +25 | 65 | |
| 7 | Mildenhall Town | 40 | 19 | 7 | 14 | 76 | 60 | +16 | 64 | |
| 8 | Cambridge Regional College | 40 | 18 | 9 | 13 | 79 | 62 | +17 | 63 | |
| 9 | Norwich United | 40 | 18 | 9 | 13 | 57 | 50 | +7 | 63 | |
| 10 | Dereham Town | 40 | 19 | 4 | 17 | 72 | 65 | +7 | 61 | |
| 11 | Hadleigh United | 40 | 18 | 6 | 16 | 76 | 72 | +4 | 60 | |
| 12 | Gorleston | 40 | 16 | 9 | 15 | 63 | 69 | −6 | 57 | |
| 13 | Kirkley & Pakefield | 40 | 14 | 10 | 16 | 66 | 60 | +6 | 52 | |
| 14 | Haverhill Rovers | 40 | 15 | 7 | 18 | 70 | 73 | −3 | 52 | |
| 15 | Clacton | 40 | 16 | 4 | 20 | 69 | 78 | −9 | 52 | |
| 16 | Diss Town | 40 | 14 | 8 | 18 | 37 | 48 | −11 | 50 | |
| 17 | Walsham-le-Willows | 40 | 12 | 9 | 19 | 68 | 73 | −5 | 45 | |
| 18 | Felixstowe & Walton United | 40 | 12 | 8 | 20 | 64 | 67 | −3 | 44 | |
| 19 | Wivenhoe Town | 40 | 11 | 6 | 23 | 44 | 71 | −27 | 39 | |
| 20 | Newmarket Town | 40 | 3 | 7 | 30 | 36 | 117 | −81 | 16 | Relegated to Division One |
| 21 | Great Yarmouth Town | 40 | 2 | 4 | 34 | 32 | 145 | −113 | 10 | Relegated to Division One |

Source: fchd
Rules for classification: 1) points; 2) goal difference; 3) number of goals scored.

=== Results ===
| Home \ Away | BRA | CRC | FCC | DER | DIS | ELY | FEL | GOR | GYT | HAD | HAV | KIR | MIL | NEW | NOR | STA | WAL | WIS | WIV | WOO | WRO |
|---|---|---|---|---|---|---|---|---|---|---|---|---|---|---|---|---|---|---|---|---|---|
| Brantham Athletic | | 2–0 | 2–1 | 2–2 | 1–0 | 2–2 | 3–1 | 2–2 | 5–0 | 0–6 | 3–1 | 2–1 | 4–0 | 8–1 | 1–2 | 4–2 | 0–3 | 2–2 | 0–3 | 1–0 | 1–0 |
| Cambridge Regional College | 1–0 | | 0–2 | 3–1 | 0–2 | 3–3 | 2–0 | 0–2 | 2–0 | 3–3 | 2–3 | 5–4 | 1–3 | 3–0 | 2–2 | 1–1 | 3–0 | 3–3 | 6–0 | 1–2 | 1–0 |
| Clacton | 1–1 | 3–1 | | 2–0 | 1–0 | 0–2 | 0–2 | 0–2 | 5–0 | 2–3 | 2–0 | 1–1 | 2–4 | 2–1 | 0–1 | 1–0 | 0–6 | 1–5 | 4–1 | 2–4 | 1–0 |
| Dereham Town | 3–4 | 1–5 | 4–1 | | 2–0 | 3–1 | 3–1 | 2–0 | 4–1 | 2–0 | 2–1 | 1–4 | 6–1 | 5–0 | 1–0 | 1–4 | 2–1 | 1–2 | 2–0 | 0–4 | 0–3 |
| Diss Town | 1–0 | 1–0 | 1–0 | 2–0 | | 0–0 | 0–0 | 1–2 | 4–2 | 0–1 | 1–0 | 2–1 | 1–3 | 1–3 | 0–0 | 0–3 | 3–2 | 0–2 | 2–1 | 1–1 | 0–1 |
| Ely City | 1–0 | 4–3 | 1–0 | 1–1 | 2–0 | | 3–0 | 4–2 | 2–0 | 1–1 | 4–3 | 3–3 | 1–0 | 2–1 | 2–1 | 2–4 | 1–0 | 3–1 | 1–0 | 3–1 | 1–2 |
| Felixstowe & Walton United | 1–2 | 1–3 | 0–4 | 2–1 | 1–4 | 0–2 | | 6–0 | 2–0 | 1–2 | 1–1 | 1–1 | 2–4 | 2–0 | 0–0 | 0–3 | 4–1 | 0–2 | 2–0 | 1–1 | 1–3 |
| Gorleston | 0–0 | 1–1 | 6–5 | 3–0 | 2–1 | 1–2 | 0–4 | | 5–1 | 2–3 | 2–1 | 2–1 | 0–1 | 3–1 | 2–0 | 1–1 | 0–4 | 2–2 | 1–1 | 1–2 | 2–3 |
| Great Yarmouth Town | 4–3 | 0–2 | 2–8 | 1–2 | 1–1 | 2–4 | 1–7 | 2–2 | | 1–3 | 0–3 | 0–4 | 0–4 | 3–1 | 0–5 | 0–4 | 1–3 | 0–1 | 2–2 | 1–8 | 0–7 |
| Hadleigh United | 0–3 | 0–6 | 2–3 | 4–1 | 2–0 | 1–3 | 1–0 | 3–0 | 2–1 | | 3–1 | 3–1 | 2–4 | 3–0 | 2–3 | 1–3 | 3–0 | 1–2 | 3–1 | 1–6 | 0–2 |
| Haverhill Rovers | 0–3 | 5–3 | 5–2 | 0–3 | 2–0 | 5–1 | 3–1 | 2–2 | 3–0 | 0–0 | | 2–2 | 1–0 | 6–1 | 0–3 | 3–2 | 3–0 | 0–5 | 0–2 | 1–4 | 1–2 |
| Kirkley & Pakefield | 1–0 | 0–2 | 1–2 | 1–1 | 1–0 | 1–2 | 2–1 | 1–3 | 2–0 | 5–2 | 3–0 | | 0–3 | 0–0 | 1–1 | 1–3 | 4–3 | 4–2 | 3–0 | 1–1 | 0–1 |
| Mildenhall Town | 0–1 | 1–1 | 1–2 | 1–3 | 2–1 | 2–5 | 1–0 | 1–1 | 4–1 | 1–1 | 0–2 | 3–0 | | 1–1 | 1–1 | 5–4 | 2–1 | 9–0 | 0–0 | 2–1 | 1–3 |
| Newmarket Town | 0–6 | 0–0 | 1–3 | 0–3 | 0–0 | 0–3 | 4–1 | 0–1 | 6–1 | 1–3 | 0–0 | 0–2 | 1–1 | | 2–3 | 0–2 | 1–4 | 2–5 | 1–3 | 4–5 | 0–4 |
| Norwich United | 0–4 | 1–1 | 3–1 | 2–1 | 0–1 | 2–0 | 1–3 | 2–0 | 2–0 | 1–1 | 2–2 | 1–1 | 1–0 | 3–0 | | 1–2 | 2–1 | 0–3 | 3–2 | 2–1 | 0–1 |
| Stanway Rovers | 3–1 | 1–2 | 5–1 | 3–0 | 1–1 | 1–3 | 2–6 | 2–1 | 6–1 | 2–0 | 1–4 | 2–0 | 3–0 | 3–1 | 0–1 | | 1–1 | 3–1 | 2–1 | 0–2 | 2–2 |
| Walsham-le-Willows | 0–5 | 1–2 | 2–2 | 1–1 | 2–2 | 0–2 | 1–1 | 0–2 | 5–0 | 0–0 | 2–1 | 2–1 | 0–3 | 2–2 | 0–3 | 1–1 | | 1–2 | 3–1 | 3–1 | 3–1 |
| Wisbech Town | 0–1 | 1–3 | 1–1 | 0–3 | 0–1 | 2–1 | 0–0 | 3–1 | 2–0 | 4–1 | 1–2 | 2–0 | 2–1 | 4–1 | 4–0 | 3–1 | 5–2 | | 3–0 | 0–0 | 1–2 |
| Wivenhoe Town | 1–3 | 1–0 | 2–0 | 0–3 | 0–2 | 4–1 | 0–4 | 2–0 | 2–0 | 2–1 | 1–1 | 1–6 | 1–2 | 4–0 | 2–0 | 0–2 | 1–1 | 0–1 | | 0–0 | 0–2 |
| Woodbridge Town | 2–3 | 1–2 | 2–0 | 2–0 | 1–0 | 6–0 | 3–1 | 1–2 | 2–2 | 1–6 | 5–2 | 0–1 | 1–0 | 5–0 | 4–2 | 1–1 | 1–5 | 1–4 | 3–2 | | 0–0 |
| Wroxham | 1–1 | 6–0 | 3–1 | 2–1 | 5–0 | 2–2 | 3–3 | 1–2 | 6–1 | 3–2 | 2–0 | 0–0 | 2–4 | 7–0 | 1–0 | 2–0 | 2–1 | 2–1 | 1–0 | 3–0 | |

Source: Mitoo
Legend: Blue = home team win; Yellow = draw; Red = away team win.

== Division One ==
Eastern Counties Football League Division One
- Season: 2011–12
- Champions: Godmanchester Rovers
- Promoted: Godmanchester Rovers; Thetford Town
- Matches: 240
- Goals: 850 (3.54 per match)

Division One featured 14 clubs which competed in the division last season, along with two new clubs:

- Brightlingsea Regent, promoted from the Essex and Suffolk Border Football League
- Debenham LC, relegated from the Premier Division

=== League table ===
| Pos | Team | Pld | W | D | L | GF | GA | GD | Pts | Promotion |
|---|---|---|---|---|---|---|---|---|---|---|
| 1 | Godmanchester Rovers | 30 | 24 | 4 | 2 | 94 | 26 | +68 | 76 | Promoted to the Premier Division |
| 2 | Thetford Town | 30 | 25 | 1 | 4 | 86 | 24 | +62 | 76 | Promoted to the Premier Division |
| 3 | Whitton United | 30 | 20 | 6 | 4 | 67 | 29 | +38 | 66 | |
| 4 | March Town United | 30 | 16 | 4 | 10 | 58 | 30 | +28 | 52 | |
| 5 | Brightlingsea Regent | 30 | 17 | 1 | 12 | 55 | 47 | +8 | 52 | |
| 6 | Halstead Town | 30 | 15 | 5 | 10 | 65 | 46 | +19 | 50 | |
| 7 | Debenham LC | 30 | 15 | 3 | 12 | 54 | 48 | +6 | 48 | |
| 8 | Cambridge University Press | 30 | 12 | 6 | 12 | 46 | 42 | +4 | 42 | |
| 9 | Long Melford | 30 | 12 | 2 | 16 | 46 | 60 | −14 | 38 | |
| 10 | Team Bury | 30 | 11 | 3 | 16 | 46 | 45 | +1 | 36 | |
| 11 | Fakenham Town | 30 | 10 | 6 | 14 | 44 | 48 | −4 | 36 | |
| 12 | Ipswich Wanderers | 30 | 11 | 2 | 17 | 47 | 78 | −31 | 35 | |
| 13 | Swaffham Town | 30 | 10 | 2 | 18 | 45 | 75 | −30 | 32 | |
| 14 | Downham Town | 30 | 6 | 6 | 18 | 32 | 66 | −34 | 24 | |
| 15 | Stowmarket Town | 30 | 5 | 3 | 22 | 42 | 76 | −34 | 18 | |
| 16 | Cornard United | 30 | 2 | 4 | 24 | 23 | 110 | −87 | 10 | |

Source: fchd
Rules for classification: 1) points; 2) goal difference; 3) number of goals scored.

=== Results ===
| Home \ Away | BRI | CAM | COR | DEB | DOW | FAK | GOD | HAL | IPS | LOM | MAR | STO | SWA | TBU | THE | WHI |
|---|---|---|---|---|---|---|---|---|---|---|---|---|---|---|---|---|
| Brightlingsea Regent | | 0–1 | 2–0 | 2–3 | 6–1 | 1–0 | 3–2 | 3–0 | 2–1 | 0–1 | 1–3 | 2–1 | 3–2 | 4–0 | 0–1 | 2–1 |
| Cambridge University Press | 2–1 | | 2–1 | 0–3 | 3–3 | 1–1 | 1–2 | 1–3 | 2–3 | 2–3 | 1–0 | 4–1 | 2–3 | 4–1 | 1–3 | 0–1 |
| Cornard United | 2–4 | 0–5 | | 2–4 | 2–0 | 1–3 | 1–7 | 3–3 | 3–0 | 0–4 | 0–2 | 0–3 | 2–3 | 0–4 | 0–5 | 0–8 |
| Debenham LC | 2–3 | 0–2 | 1–1 | | 1–1 | 0–2 | 0–5 | 3–2 | 2–3 | 2–0 | 2–1 | 2–1 | 3–1 | 3–1 | 1–5 | 0–1 |
| Downham Town | 1–2 | 0–2 | 2–0 | 1–2 | | 0–1 | 1–1 | 2–0 | 6–2 | 3–2 | 0–7 | 2–1 | 2–2 | 0–1 | 1–2 | 0–2 |
| Fakenham Town | 1–0 | 2–2 | 6–1 | 0–3 | 1–2 | | 0–0 | 0–1 | 6–2 | 3–0 | 3–2 | 1–1 | 5–0 | 2–1 | 0–4 | 0–2 |
| Godmanchester Rovers | 2–0 | 2–0 | 10–0 | 1–0 | 2–0 | 2–0 | | 3–3 | 3–0 | 5–1 | 0–3 | 3–1 | 7–1 | 5–3 | 2–0 | 5–0 |
| Halstead Town | 4–0 | 2–0 | 4–0 | 3–2 | 6–0 | 2–1 | 1–2 | | 1–1 | 4–1 | 1–1 | 1–2 | 4–1 | 2–1 | 1–3 | 1–1 |
| Ipswich Wanderers | 2–1 | 0–2 | 1–1 | 2–4 | 6–2 | 1–0 | 0–3 | 0–5 | | 2–0 | 0–4 | 1–0 | 3–2 | 0–2 | 1–4 | 2–1 |
| Long Melford | 1–3 | 2–2 | 3–1 | 1–2 | 2–0 | 1–1 | 1–3 | 1–0 | 3–2 | | 3–2 | 2–0 | 3–2 | 2–1 | 1–3 | 1–2 |
| March Town United | 1–2 | 1–1 | 4–0 | 1–0 | 2–0 | 2–0 | 0–1 | 3–1 | 4–1 | 1–0 | | 2–1 | 1–3 | 2–0 | 2–0 | 2–2 |
| Stowmarket Town | 4–0 | 0–1 | 2–0 | 1–4 | 1–1 | 5–0 | 1–4 | 3–4 | 0–4 | 3–4 | 1–1 | | 0–2 | 0–4 | 1–4 | 2–4 |
| Swaffham Town | 1–2 | 1–0 | 1–1 | 1–4 | 1–0 | 2–1 | 1–6 | 0–3 | 2–4 | 4–3 | 1–5 | 5–2 | | 0–2 | 1–2 | 1–2 |
| Team Bury | 0–3 | 0–1 | 4–0 | 1–1 | 3–0 | 3–3 | 1–2 | 1–2 | 5–1 | 1–0 | 2–0 | 3–1 | 0–1 | | 1–1 | 0–2 |
| Thetford Town | 4–0 | 2–0 | 10–0 | 1–0 | 2–0 | 4–1 | 1–2 | 5–0 | 5–2 | 3–1 | 3–1 | 5–1 | 1–0 | 1–0 | | 2–0 |
| Whitton United | 3–3 | 1–1 | 3–1 | 2–0 | 1–1 | 2–0 | 2–2 | 2–1 | 3–0 | 5–0 | 1–0 | 5–0 | 3–1 | 2–1 | 3–0 | |

Source: Mitoo
Legend: Blue = home team win; Yellow = draw; Red = away team win.
