= 2009–10 Eastern Counties Football League =

The 2009–10 season was the 68th in the history of Eastern Counties Football League a football competition in England.

Needham Market were champions, winning their first Eastern Counties Football League title and were promoted to the Isthmian League for the first time in their history.

== Premier Division ==
Eastern Counties Football League Premier Division
- Season: 2009–10
- Champions: Needham Market
- Promoted: Needham Market
- Matches: 380
- Goals: 1,230 (3.24 per match)

The Premier Division featured 19 clubs which competed in the division last season, along with three new clubs, promoted from Division One:

- Debenham LC
- Hadleigh United
- Newmarket Town

=== League table ===
Pos	Team	Pld	W	D	L	GF	GA	GD	Pts	Promotion or relegation
1	Needham Market	38	27	7	4	83	32	+51	88	Promoted to the Isthmian League
2	Cambridge Regional College	38	27	6	5	96	29	+67	87	
3	Leiston	38	26	4	8	87	38	+49	82	
4	Kirkley & Pakefield	38	22	5	11	76	47	+29	71	
5	Stanway Rovers	38	20	8	10	74	47	+27	68	
6	Mildenhall Town	38	20	6	12	80	59	+21	66	
7	Felixstowe & Walton United	38	18	10	10	55	51	+4	64	
8	Wroxham	38	17	8	13	55	51	+4	59	
9	Ely City	38	17	6	15	54	55	−1	57	
10	Dereham Town	38	16	8	14	70	58	+12	56	
11	Wisbech Town	38	16	8	14	61	55	+6	56	
12	Haverhill Rovers	38	12	11	15	55	61	−6	47	
13	Walsham-le-Willows	38	13	7	18	53	65	−12	46	
14	Debenham LC	38	14	4	20	49	62	−13	46	
15	Norwich United	38	11	10	17	61	67	−6	43	
16	Newmarket Town	38	11	6	21	55	67	−12	39	
17	Histon reserves	38	10	5	23	54	84	−30	35	
18	Hadleigh United	38	8	10	20	42	76	−34	34	
19	Woodbridge Town	38	6	2	30	40	102	−62	20	
20	Wivenhoe Town	38	1	5	32	30	124	−94	8	
21	Harwich & Parkeston	0	0	0	0	0	0	0	0 (Note: Harwich & Parkeston resigned from the league on 9 February 2010 and their record was expunged.)	Resigned from the league, record expunged
22	King's Lynn reserves	0	0	0	0	0	0	0	0 (Note: King's Lynn folded on 9 December 2009 and their record was expunged.)	Club folded, record expunged

Source: fchd
Rules for classification: 1) points; 2) goal difference; 3) number of goals scored.

== Division One ==
Eastern Counties Football League Division One
- Season: 2009–10
- Champions: Great Yarmouth Town
- Promoted: Brantham Athletic; Clacton; Great Yarmouth Town
- Matches: 342
- Goals: 1,196 (3.5 per match)

Division One featured 17 clubs which competed in the division last season, along with two new clubs:

- Team Bury, joined from the Essex and Suffolk Border League
- Whitton United, demoted from the Premier Division

=== League table ===
Pos	Team	Pld	W	D	L	GF	GA	GD	Pts	Promotion
1	Great Yarmouth Town	36	28	6	2	96	28	+68	90	Promoted to the Premier Division
2	Clacton	36	27	7	2	117	40	+77	88	Promoted to the Premier Division
3	Brantham Athletic	36	26	6	4	112	34	+78	84	Promoted to the Premier Division
4	Gorleston	36	25	4	7	67	33	+34	79	
5	Diss Town	36	20	9	7	83	50	+33	69	
6	Halstead Town	36	20	7	9	91	47	+44	67	
7	March Town United	36	20	5	11	71	51	+20	65	
8	Saffron Walden Town	36	16	8	12	66	40	+26	56	
9	Team Bury	36	15	4	17	59	69	−10	49	
10	Whitton United	36	13	8	15	51	59	−8	47	
11	Thetford Town	36	11	10	15	51	63	−12	43	
12	Godmanchester Rovers	36	11	9	16	55	70	−15	42	
13	Cornard United	36	10	6	20	51	72	−21	36	
14	Swaffham Town	36	10	5	21	43	84	−41	35	
15	Stowmarket Town	36	9	6	21	46	64	−18	33	
16	Long Melford	36	6	8	22	37	86	−49	26	
17	Ipswich Wanderers	36	7	3	26	39	92	−53	24	
18	Downham Town	36	6	4	26	33	130	−97	22	
19	Fakenham Town	36	2	5	29	28	84	−56	11	

Source: fchd
Rules for classification: 1) points; 2) goal difference; 3) number of goals scored.
