= 2010–11 Eastern Counties Football League =

The 2010–11 season was the 69th in the history of Eastern Counties Football League a football competition in England.

Leiston were champions, winning their first Eastern Counties Football League title and were promoted to the Isthmian League for the first time in their history.

== Premier Division ==
Eastern Counties Football League Premier Division
- Season: 2010–11
- Champions: Leiston
- Promoted: Leiston
- Relegated: Debenham LC
- Matches: 462
- Goals: 1,517 (3.28 per match)

The Premier Division featured 19 clubs which competed in the division last season, along with three new clubs, promoted from Division One:

- Brantham Athletic
- Clacton
- Great Yarmouth Town

=== League table ===
Pos	Team	Pld	W	D	L	GF	GA	GD	Pts	Promotion or relegation
1	Leiston	42	29	8	5	97	39	+58	95	Promoted to the Isthmian League
2	Dereham Town	42	25	9	8	88	42	+46	84	
3	Wroxham	42	24	8	10	85	52	+33	80	
4	Wisbech Town	42	21	13	8	77	49	+28	76	
5	Mildenhall Town	42	22	7	13	66	50	+16	73	
6	Norwich United	42	20	10	12	85	49	+36	70	
7	Stanway Rovers	42	18	13	11	83	52	+31	67	
8	Haverhill Rovers	42	18	11	13	58	55	+3	65	
9	Hadleigh United	42	18	9	15	83	72	+11	63	
10	Woodbridge Town	42	18	8	16	70	84	−14	62	
11	Cambridge Regional College	42	15	12	15	73	59	+14	57	
12	Kirkley & Pakefield	42	16	9	17	59	62	−3	57	
13	Brantham Athletic	42	15	6	21	86	79	+7	51	
14	Great Yarmouth Town	42	13	12	17	73	80	−7	51	
15	Ely City	42	13	10	19	58	62	−4	49	
16	Clacton	42	13	10	19	57	71	−14	49	
17	Walsham-le-Willows	42	9	19	14	65	72	−7	46	
18	Felixstowe & Walton United	42	11	11	20	55	84	−29	44	
19	Newmarket Town	42	10	11	21	45	89	−44	41	
20	Wivenhoe Town	42	6	14	22	48	76	−28	32	
21	Histon reserves	42	7	10	25	50	132	−82	31	Resigned from the league
22	Debenham LC	42	7	8	27	56	107	−51	29	Relegated to Division One

Source: fchd
Rules for classification: 1) points; 2) goal difference; 3) number of goals scored.

== Division One ==
Eastern Counties Football League Division One
- Season: 2010–11
- Champions: Gorleston
- Promoted: Diss Town; Gorleston
- Matches: 272
- Goals: 980 (3.6 per match)

Division One featured 16 clubs which competed in the division last season, along with one new club:

- Cambridge University Press, joined from the Cambridgeshire League

=== League table ===
Pos	Team	Pld	W	D	L	GF	GA	GD	Pts	Promotion
1	Gorleston	32	22	4	6	85	32	+53	70	Promoted to the Premier Division
2	Whitton United	32	20	9	3	79	33	+46	69	
3	Diss Town	32	20	5	7	75	27	+48	65	Promoted to the Premier Division
4	Cambridge University Press	32	18	8	6	82	44	+38	62	
5	Thetford Town	32	16	7	9	70	47	+23	55	
6	Saffron Walden Town	32	15	8	9	68	41	+27	53	Resigned from the league
7	Stowmarket Town	32	16	5	11	67	44	+23	53	
8	March Town United	32	15	4	13	53	53	0	49	
9	Godmanchester Rovers	32	12	9	11	61	41	+20	45	
10	Ipswich Wanderers	32	12	6	14	60	67	−7	42	
11	Halstead Town	32	12	5	15	44	59	−15	41	
12	Long Melford	32	11	4	17	44	64	−20	37	
13	Team Bury	32	9	8	15	48	65	−17	35	
14	Fakenham Town	32	8	9	15	37	53	−16	33	
15	Swaffham Town	32	9	5	18	53	78	−25	32	
16	Downham Town	32	4	5	23	37	91	−54	17	
17	Cornard United	32	2	1	29	17	141	−124	7	

Source: fchd
Rules for classification: 1) points; 2) goal difference; 3) number of goals scored.
