= Jez George =

English football manager (born 1970)

Personal information
- Date of birth: 24 January 1970 (age 56)
- Place of birth: Cambridgeshire, England

Team information
- Current team: Lincoln City (Director of Football)

Managerial career
- Years: Team
- 2006–2011: Cambridge Regional College
- 2011–2012: Cambridge United

Jeremy "Jez" George (born 24 January 1970) is an English football executive and former manager who is currently Director of Football at EFL Championship side Lincoln City.

He was previously the Chief Executive Officer of Cambridge United in EFL League Two and a prominent figure in the Cambridge United Youth & Community Trust.

George is also a noted football lobbyist and fundraiser, campaigning for changes to rules in youth football funding which currently see clubs relegated from the English Football League (EFL) lose the entirety of their funding after two seasons. As part of his work he has founded the organisation Protect Football's Future, has taken part in two cross-country charity walks raising over £100,000 for youth development schemes.

== Youth football ==
=== Cambridge United Youth & Community Trust ===
George was integral in setting up the Cambridge United Youth & Community Trust, which was formed in March 2010 to provide sport and learning activities for children in Cambridge and the surrounding area. Its mission statement is "to positively influence the lifetime potential of 10,000 children annually through sport", which it seeks to achieve through operating football courses and a Centre of Excellence, alongside more traditional education courses which it runs out of its state of the art Learning Centre at the Abbey Stadium.

As a result of his involvement with the Trust, and as manager of Cambridge Regional College, George became intimately involved with the financing of youth football. Because of its status as a non-league club, Cambridge United receives no funding from the Football League Youth Development scheme, despite its historical success in producing players for both its own first team, and other clubs; indeed, the club's youth system is regarded throughout professional football circles as one of the best in England. George's first fundraising venture saw him walk from Torquay to Cambridge to highlight the injustice in the funding rules which saw Torquay United receive £180,000 for their youth set-up following their victory over Cambridge United in the 2009 play-off final. The walk saw George, along with then centre of excellence manager Matt Walker, cover 260 miles and raise £40,000 to help towards the annual running costs of Cambridge's youth teams.

=== Protect Football's Future ===
Protect Football's Future was launched in April 2010 as a coalition between six former league clubs - Wrexham, Oxford United, York City, Rushden & Diamonds, Mansfield Town and Cambridge United - to oppose the FA's funding rules which they perceived as unfair and creating a postcode lottery. To publicise the launch, George undertook a 19-day, 410-mile walk in April and May 2010 from Wrexham to Wembley to raise funds and awareness of the campaign. During the so-called 'Walk for Change', close to 3,000 signatures were collected on a petition, with past and present Premier League players Dave Kitson, Danny Murphy, Curtis Davies and Jack Collison among those pledging support.

The walk raised around £60,000 for youth development funds and garnered much media attention for the campaign, culminating in the presentation of the petition to the FA at Wembley, and an All Star Match at the Abbey Stadium. Dave Kitson, in particular, was a vocal supporter of George's campaign, appearing at the All Star Match, conducting various media interviews and (alongside Jack Collison and Curtis Davis) writing an open letter to the FA, Premier League and Football League supporting the need for changes to youth football's financing.

In January 2011, George said of his campaign that "some progress has been made but it’s a very slow process". This followed meetings with Sir Trevor Brooking, the FA's director of football development and Jed Roddy, the Premier League's head of youth, to discuss the Protect Football's Future campaign.

== Managerial career ==
=== Cambridge Regional College ===
After joining Cambridge United from local rivals Cambridge City, George became the first manager of Cambridge Regional College, a team formed in 2006 as a de facto reserve team. FA rules prohibit reserve teams playing at certain levels of the football pyramid, and so the Cambridge Regional College (CRC) name was adopted in recognition of the college's financial support, and because the team is made up almost entirely of scholars.

George coached the team for a number of years to considerable success both on and off the field as it grew to establish itself in the Eastern Counties Football League, finishing runners-up in 2008–09 and again in 2009–10, producing a number of players who would go on to star in Cambridge's first team, notably Josh Coulson, Robbie Willmott and Luke Berry.

=== Cambridge United ===
When Martin Ling left Cambridge United on 1 February 2011 after 87 games in charge, George took over as caretaker manager of the first team, initially until the end of the 2010–11 season. After successfully guiding the team to safety from relegation, his position was made permanent at the end of the season.

George set about reshaping the team prior to the 2011–12 season in order to meet budget cuts, which saw a 25% reduction in the club's playing budget. A number of the club's highest earners, including former assistant manager Paul Carden and the previous season's top scorer Danny Wright, left the club as George implemented a disciplined wage structure: "the players who were over the wage ceiling...were quite categorically told the options they had to them were to take a pay cut and discuss what that would be or to find another club".

Despite the budget restraints, however, George enjoyed a successful start to the season with a team made up of CRC graduates and promising youngsters. Early season form saw the team establish itself in the play-off positions following notable away wins against Luton Town and Mansfield Town, both tipped for success prior to the start of the season. Such was the dramatic change in the mood around the club under George's management, attendances began to recover from the historic lows seen under the Ling-era, and fans coined the term 'the Jezolution', a portmanteau of George's forename and 'revolution', selling 'Viva La Jezolution' merchandise to continue George's legacy of fundraising from his youth football days. On 14 April 2012, George paid the ticket entry fee for each of the 80 Cambridge United fans who attended the club's away fixture at Barrow out of his own pocket. This generous act was George's way of thanking the club's fans for their loyal support throughout his first full year in charge, and was followed by the first team players on that day buying a large amount of pizzas for the away fans to eat on their 270-mile journey home. Cambridge United would finish the 2011–12 season in 9th place.

George led Cambridge United to two wins out of their first three league matches in the 2012–13 Conference National campaign. This strong start was followed by a run of eight games where they failed to win, only securing three draws. This poor run of form led George to announce his return to his previous role as Director of Football on 4 October 2012. At the same time, Richard Money was announced as the new head coach of Cambridge United. He was made Chief Executive Officer of Cambridge United in October 2014.

== Managerial statistics ==
As of 4 October 2012

Managerial record by team and tenure
| Team | From | To | Record | | | | | Ref |
| Team | From | To | P | W | D | L | Win % | Ref |
|---|---|---|---|---|---|---|---|---|
| Cambridge United | 2 February 2011 | 4 October 2012 | 83 | 29 | 27 | 27 | 34.9 | |
| Total | | | 83 | 29 | 27 | 27 | 34.9 | — |
