= 1978–79 Eastern Counties Football League =

The 1978–79 season was the first under this name and 37th in the history of Eastern Counties Football League a football competition in England.

The league featured 20 clubs which competed in the league last season, along with two new clubs:

- Brantham Athletic, joined from the Essex and Suffolk Border League
- Cambridge United reserves

Haverhill Rovers were champions, winning their first Eastern Counties Football League title.

== League table ==
Town & Country League
- Season: 1978–79
- Champions: Haverhill Rovers
- Matches played: 462
- Goals scored: 1,502 (3.25 per match)

Pos	Team	Pld	W	D	L	GF	GA	GD	Pts	Promotion or relegation
1	Haverhill Rovers	42	29	9	4	90	36	+54	67	
2	Great Yarmouth Town	42	28	10	4	112	44	+68	66	
3	Lowestoft Town	42	24	15	3	89	46	+43	63	
4	Bury Town	42	27	7	8	99	56	+43	61	
5	Sudbury Town	42	19	11	12	78	50	+28	49	
6	Ely City	42	19	10	13	50	57	−7	48	
7	Gorleston	42	21	4	17	74	67	+7	46	
8	Braintree & Crittall Athletic	42	18	9	15	78	72	+6	45	
9	Wisbech Town	42	17	11	14	68	69	−1	45	
10	Brantham Athletic	42	16	11	15	62	61	+1	43	
11	March Town United	42	16	9	17	65	69	−4	41	
12	Cambridge United reserves	42	16	9	17	58	67	−9	41	Resigned from the league
13	Soham Town Rangers	42	18	4	20	70	74	−4	40	
14	Thetford Town	42	14	9	19	73	78	−5	37	
15	Histon	42	15	6	21	61	73	−12	36	
16	Saffron Walden Town	42	13	9	20	64	68	−4	35	
17	Felixstowe Town	42	11	10	21	43	64	−21	32	
18	Colchester United reserves	42	11	8	23	54	78	−24	30	
19	Stowmarket	42	10	9	23	62	84	−22	29	
20	Clacton Town	42	8	13	21	38	62	−24	29	
21	Chatteris Town	42	10	7	25	80	120	−40	27	
22	Newmarket Town	42	5	4	33	34	107	−73	14	

Source: fchd
Rules for classification: 1) points; 2) goal difference; 3) number of goals scored.
