= 1971–72 Eastern Counties Football League =

The 1971–72 Eastern Counties Football League was the 30th season in the history of the Eastern Counties Football League.

Wisbech Town were champions, winning their first Eastern Counties Football League title.

== League table ==
Eastern Counties Football League
- Season: 1971–72
- Champions: Wisbech Town
- Matches played: 380
- Goals scored: 1,356 (3.57 per match)

Pos	Team	Pld	W	D	L	GF	GA	GAv	Pts	Promotion or relegation
1	Wisbech Town (C)	38	30	3	5	98	34	2.882	63	
2	Lowestoft Town	38	25	7	6	106	47	2.255	57	
3	Gorleston	38	22	9	7	65	35	1.857	53	
4	Chatteris Town	38	20	4	14	87	65	1.338	44	
5	Thetford Town	38	17	8	13	81	65	1.246	42	
6	St Neots Town	38	17	8	13	71	60	1.183	42	
7	Ely City	38	15	9	14	77	67	1.149	39	
8	Great Yarmouth Town	38	13	13	12	59	57	1.035	39	
9	Norwich City 'A'	38	16	7	15	66	68	0.971	39	
10	Stowmarket	38	14	11	13	61	65	0.938	39	
11	Clacton Town	38	15	9	14	80	79	1.013	39	
12	Sudbury Town	38	14	10	14	58	51	1.137	38	
13	Gothic	38	15	7	16	71	68	1.044	37	
14	Braintree & Crittall	38	14	8	16	47	55	0.855	36	
15	March Town United	38	13	9	16	79	88	0.898	35	
16	Histon	38	11	8	19	64	77	0.831	30	
17	Soham Town Rangers	38	8	13	17	64	88	0.727	29	
18	Haverhill Rovers	38	6	10	22	49	81	0.605	22	
19	Maldon Town	38	4	12	22	34	97	0.351	20	Left to join Essex Senior Football League
20	Newmarket Town	38	5	7	26	39	109	0.358	17	

Source: rsssf.org
Rules for classification: 1) Points; 2) Goal average; 3) Goals scored
(C) Champions
