= Nick Pope (footballer) =

English footballer (born 1992)

- Pope playing for Newcastle United in 2026

Personal information
- Full name: Nicholas David Pope
- Date of birth: 19 April 1992 (age 34)
- Place of birth: Soham, England
- Height: 6 ft 6 in (1.98 m) (Note: Burnley, Newcastle United and the Premier League record Pope's height as 6 feet 3 inches (1.91 m), whereas Pope himself has contended in interviews that his height is 6 feet 6 inches (1.98 m).)
- Position: Goalkeeper

Team information
- Current team: Newcastle United
- Number: 1

Youth career
- 200?–2008: Ipswich Town

Senior career*
Years	Team	Apps	(Gls)
2008–2011	Team Bury (Note: Team Bury appearances and goals do not include 2008–09 season)	16	(0)
2010–2011	Bury Town	5	(0)
2011–2016	Charlton Athletic	33	(0)
2011	→ Harrow Borough (loan)	15	(0)
2011–2012	→ Welling United (loan)	2	(0)
2012	→ Welling United (loan)	2	(0)
2013	→ Cambridge United (loan)	9	(0)
2013	→ Aldershot Town (loan)	5	(0)
2013	→ York City (loan)	2	(0)
2014	→ York City (loan)	20	(0)
2015	→ Bury (loan)	22	(0)
2016–2022	Burnley	141	(0)
2022–	Newcastle United	107	(0)

International career^{‡}
2018–2022	England	10	(0)
- * Club domestic league appearances and goals as of 23:30, 24 May 2026 (UTC) ‡ National team caps and goals as of 22:10, 26 September 2022 (UTC)

Nicholas David Pope (born 19 April 1992) is an English professional footballer who plays as a goalkeeper for Premier League club Newcastle United and the England national team.

Pope started his career in Ipswich Town's youth teams and after being released aged 16, he joined Bury Town. He signed for League One club Charlton Athletic in May 2011, before having loan spells with Harrow Borough, Welling United, Cambridge United, Aldershot Town, York City and Bury. In July 2016, Pope joined Premier League club Burnley, where he remained until the club's relegation to the Championship in May 2022, after which he signed for Newcastle the following month.

In 2018, Pope made his debut for the England national team, and has been a member of the 2018 FIFA World Cup and 2022 FIFA World Cup squads.

== Early life ==
Nicholas David Pope was born on 19 April 1992 in Soham, Cambridgeshire. He attended St Andrew's Primary School in Soham and was in the same class as murdered schoolgirls Holly Wells and Jessica Chapman. He later attended King's School in nearby Ely.

== Club career ==
=== Early career ===
An Ipswich Town season ticket holder, he began his career at the club's youth set-up at the age of 10 and remained with Ipswich until being released aged 16. Following his release by Ipswich, he joined non-League club Bury Town in 2008. Having challenged and temporarily replaced Marcus Garnham, Pope proved he was capable at that level when he wore the number one shirt for Bury Town for a number of first-team matches after initially debuting for the team at just 16 years of age. Manager Richard Wilkins described Pope as "the most naturally-talented player to progress through the ranks at the West Suffolk Sports Academy and Bury Town" and said "I honestly think Nick Pope can go all the way to the top." Pope was also a member of the West Suffolk College squad and has represented an England Colleges squad.

=== Charlton Athletic ===
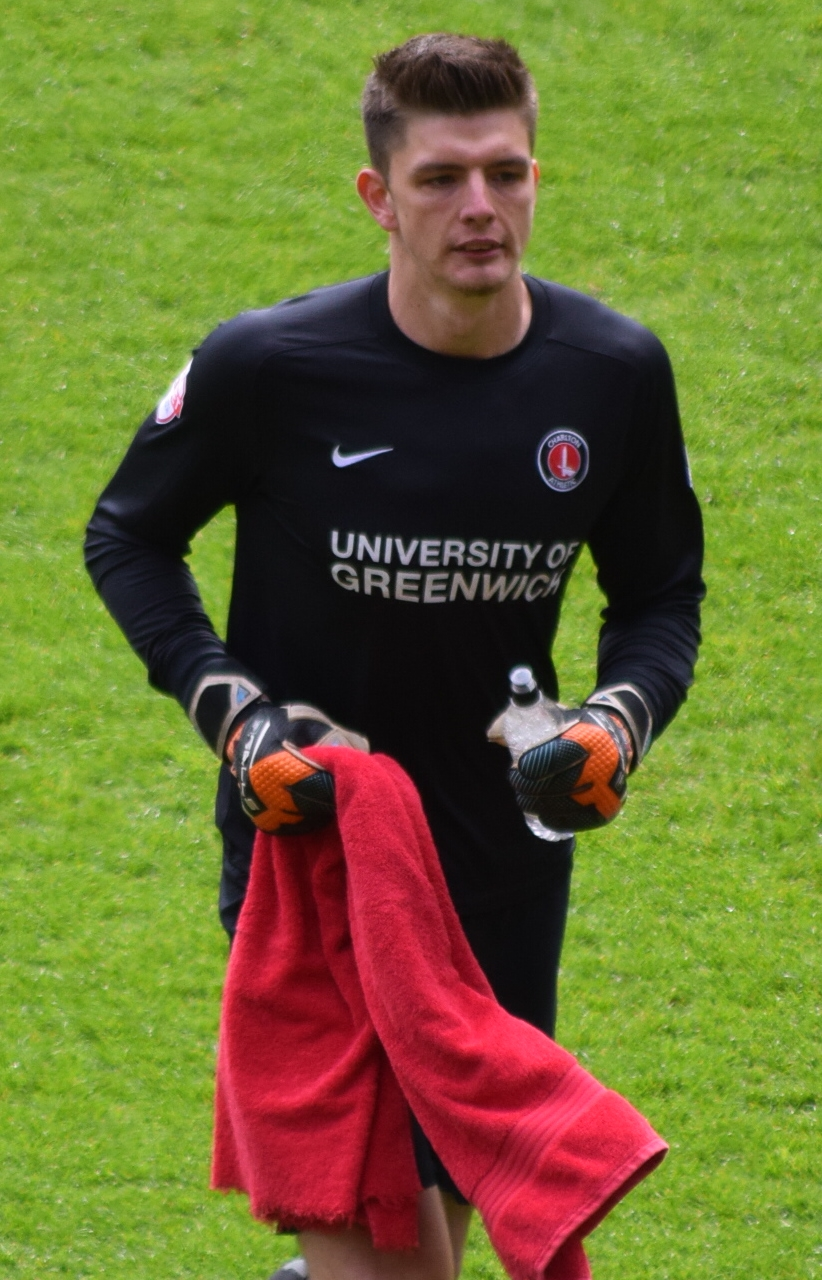
Pope playing for Charlton Athletic in 2016

On 24 May 2011, League One club Charlton Athletic signed Pope after he was spotted by scouts during a 2–1 win over Billericay Town. He was then invited to a trial at Charlton. After impressing staff during a trial, he was signed on a two-year contract after the two clubs agreed a compensation package, which included Charlton taking on the Suffolk outfit in a pre-season friendly ahead of the 2012–13 season (which he was unable to play due to injury). Charlton also paid for Pope to take a degree in sports science at the University of Roehampton alongside other courses which he had planned to take at the University of Nottingham before being signed by Charlton. On 7 February 2012, Pope signed a new two-year contract with Charlton. He made his Charlton and professional debut on 4 May 2013, in the last match of the 2012–13 season, as a 71st minute substitute for David Button in a 4–1 home win for Charlton against already relegated Bristol City in the Championship.

Pope signed a new three-year contract with Charlton in September 2013, and commented that "It's a big club so to have a long-term future secure, for me, as a player developing, it's something you look for".

On 5 June 2014, Pope signed a new four-year contract, securing his future to Charlton until June 2018.

==== Loan spells ====
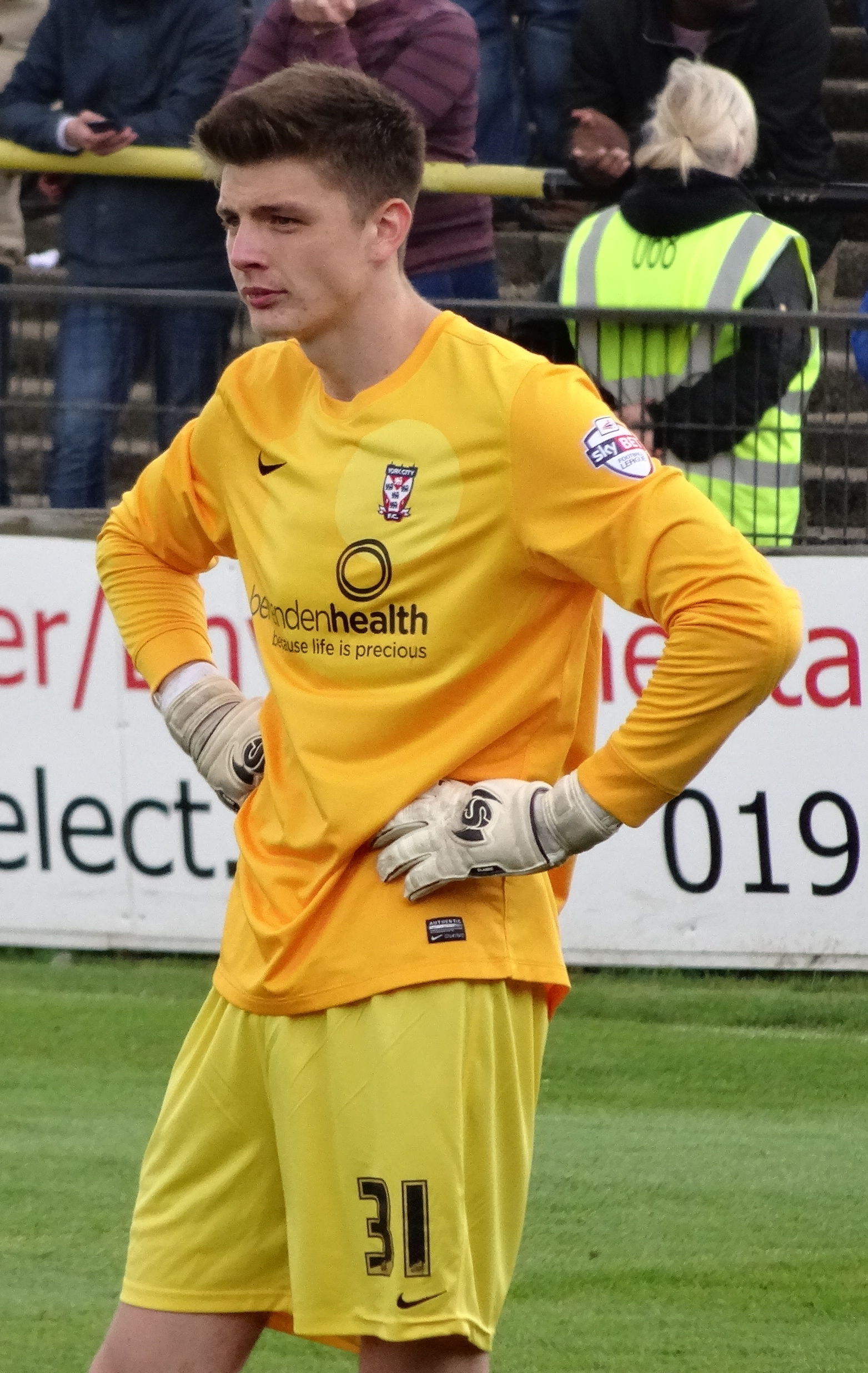
Pope playing for York City in 2014

In August 2011, Pope joined Isthmian League Premier Division club Harrow Borough on a loan deal lasting until 17 September 2011. Whilst there Pope kept three clean sheets and saved two penalty kicks in 19 appearances. Pope was then meant to join Conference Premier club Kettering Town in December 2011, but the deal could not be concluded due to Kettering being placed under a transfer embargo. As a result, he joined Conference South club Welling United on 21 December 2011 on a 28-day loan instead. On 7 March 2013, Pope joined Cambridge United in the Conference Premier on a one-month loan. Whilst at the club, he made nine appearances, keeping four clean sheets in the process.

On 26 September 2013, Pope joined Conference Premier club Aldershot Town on a one-month loan. He joined League Two club York City on 21 November 2013 on a one-month loan, but was recalled after only two matches by Charlton. On 16 January 2014, Pope rejoined York on loan for the rest of the 2013–14 season, keeping 16 clean sheets in 24 appearances.

On 6 January 2015, Pope joined Bury on loan for the rest of the 2014–15 season. He made his debut in a 1–1 home draw with Wycombe Wanderers on 17 January 2015. He made 22 appearances as Bury won promotion after finishing in third place in League Two.

=== Burnley ===
==== 2016–2019: Cup keeper, first-team breakthrough, and injury ====
On 19 July 2016, Pope joined newly promoted Premier League club Burnley on a three-year contract for an undisclosed fee. He made his competitive debut in Burnley's shock 1–0 defeat to Accrington Stanley in the EFL Cup second round, with the winning goal coming from Matty Pearson in the last minute of extra time. He kept his first clean sheet for Burnley in their 0–0 draw at Sunderland in the FA Cup third round on 7 January 2017. He repeated the feat on his home debut, as Burnley won the replay 2–0.

Pope made his Premier League debut on 10 September 2017, replacing the injured Tom Heaton in the first half of a 1–0 home win over Crystal Palace. He made his first Premier League start the following week, on 16 September, in a 1–1 draw against Liverpool at Anfield. He kept his place in the team and played in all of Burnley's remaining fixtures that season. On 9 October, Pope signed a new contract to keep him at Burnley until 2020.

On 26 July 2018, he suffered a dislocated shoulder after colliding with Sam Cosgrove during Burnley's 1–1 draw away to Aberdeen in the 2018–19 UEFA Europa League second qualifying round first leg. Burnley signed Joe Hart on 7 August to provide cover for Pope and Tom Heaton, who was also injured. Pope made his first-team comeback in Burnley's 1–0 home win against Barnsley in the FA Cup third round, but he did not play at all in the Premier League that season.

==== 2019–2022: Burnley's number one ====
In May 2019, Pope signed a new contract with Burnley, running until 2023. On 1 August, Tom Heaton signed for Aston Villa, paving the way for Pope to become Burnley's first choice goalkeeper. He had a prolific 2019–20 season, as he featured in every minute of Burnley's Premier League campaign. Coming into the last match of the season against Brighton, Pope was level on clean sheets with Manchester City's Ederson, with both keepers having kept 15. In the 20th minute of the match against Brighton, Yves Bissouma scored, meaning Pope would finish the season with 15 clean sheets. Manchester City's final match against already-relegated Norwich City, ended 5–0 with Ederson keeping his 16th clean sheet, claiming the Golden Glove outright, narrowly beating out Pope. On 11 July 2020, Burnley drew 1–1 away to Liverpool and became the only team to take points off Liverpool at Anfield that season. Pope was highly applauded for his performance in the match, as he made eight saves to deny Liverpool a win.

Pope only missed two of Burnley's Premier League games in the 2021–22 season, but he could not save the team from relegation after six consecutive seasons in the top tier.

=== Newcastle United ===
Pope signed for Premier League club Newcastle United on 23 June 2022 on a four-year contract for an undisclosed fee, reported by Sky Sports to be £10 million. He kept a clean sheet on his competitive debut in Newcastle's 2–0 home win against Nottingham Forest on the opening day of the 2022–23 Premier League season.

Pope was sent off for handling the ball outside his penalty area in Newcastle's 2–0 home defeat to Liverpool on 18 February 2023. His dismissal meant that Newcastle were without both their first and second choice goalkeepers for the 2023 EFL Cup final against Manchester United; Martin Dúbravka was cup-tied having played for United in the third and fourth rounds during his loan spell. Third-choice goalkeeper Loris Karius made his debut as Newcastle lost the match 2–0.

During the 2022–23 season, Pope quickly rose to the top in the race for the Golden Glove, after six consecutive matches in which he did not concede a goal. He maintained this lead for a number of weeks, but in that time, only recorded one clean sheet, and he was eventually surpassed by Manchester United's David de Gea. It was later revealed that he had been playing with an injured finger, and had minor surgery on it following Newcastle's goalless draw with Leicester City, resulting in Newcastle returning to the UEFA Champions League for the first time in 20 years.

On 6 December 2023, the club said Pope would be out of action for around four months after suffering a shoulder injury in a home match against Manchester United.

On 4 January 2026, Pope made his 100th league appearance for Newcastle in a 2–0 home win against Crystal Palace at St James' Park.

== International career ==
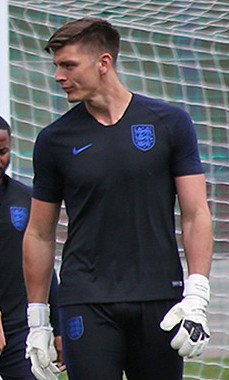
Pope training with England at the 2018 FIFA World Cup

Pope was called up to the England national team for the first time on 15 March 2018. He was named in the 23-man England squad for the 2018 FIFA World Cup. Pope made his debut on 7 June 2018 as a 65th-minute substitute as England beat Costa Rica 2–0 in a pre-tournament friendly. He made his first competitive international appearance in a 4–0 win against Kosovo for the final game in UEFA Euro 2020 qualifying on 17 November 2019. In March 2021, after England defeated Albania 2–0, Pope became the first goalkeeper to keep a clean sheet in his first six appearances for the country. Pope was selected for England's 2022 FIFA World Cup squad, but was an unused substitute behind Jordan Pickford as the team reached the quarter-finals.

== Personal life ==
Pope's long-term girlfriend is Shannon Horlock, daughter of former footballer Kevin Horlock. They have two children.

== Career statistics ==
=== Club ===
As of match played 24 May 2026

Appearances and goals by club, season and competition
Club	Season	League			FA Cup		League Cup		Europe		Other		Total	
Club	Season	Division	Apps	Goals	Apps	Goals	Apps	Goals	Apps	Goals	Apps	Goals	Apps	Goals
Team Bury	2009–10	Eastern Counties League Division One	8	0	—		—		—		1 (Note: Appearance in Eastern Counties League Challenge Cup)	0	9	0
Team Bury	2010–11	Eastern Counties League Division One	8	0	0	0	—		—		4 (Note: One appearance in FA Vase, two appearances in Eastern Counties League Challenge Cup, one appearance in Eastern Counties League Division One Cup)	0	12	0
Team Bury	Total		16	0	0	0	—		—		5	0	21	0
Bury Town	2010–11	Isthmian League Premier Division	5	0	0	0	—		—		1 (Note: Appearance in Isthmian League Cup)	0	6	0
Charlton Athletic	2011–12	League One	0	0	0	0	—		—		—		0	0
Charlton Athletic	2012–13	Championship	1	0	0	0	0	0	—		—		1	0
Charlton Athletic	2013–14	Championship	0	0	0	0	0	0	—		—		0	0
Charlton Athletic	2014–15	Championship	8	0	0	0	1	0	—		—		9	0
Charlton Athletic	2015–16	Championship	24	0	1	0	3	0	—		—		28	0
Charlton Athletic	Total		33	0	1	0	4	0	—		—		38	0
Harrow Borough (loan)	2011–12	Isthmian League Premier Division	15	0	0	0	—		—		4 (Note: One appearance in Isthmian League Cup, three appearances in FA Trophy)	0	19	0
Welling United (loan)	2011–12	Conference South	4	0	—		—		—		—		4	0
Cambridge United (loan)	2012–13	Conference Premier	9	0	—		—		—		—		9	0
Aldershot Town (loan)	2013–14	Conference Premier	5	0	—		—		—		—		5	0
York City (loan)	2013–14	League Two	22	0	—		—		—		2 (Note: Appearances in League Two play-offs)	0	24	0
Bury (loan)	2014–15	League Two	22	0	—		—		—		—		22	0
Burnley	2016–17	Premier League	0	0	3	0	1	0	—		—		4	0
Burnley	2017–18	Premier League	35	0	1	0	2	0	—		—		38	0
Burnley	2018–19	Premier League	0	0	2	0	0	0	1 (Note: Appearance in UEFA Europa League)	0	—		3	0
Burnley	2019–20	Premier League	38	0	0	0	0	0	—		—		38	0
Burnley	2020–21	Premier League	32	0	0	0	1	0	—		—		33	0
Burnley	2021–22	Premier League	36	0	1	0	2	0	—		—		39	0
Burnley	Total		141	0	7	0	6	0	1	0	—		155	0
Newcastle United	2022–23	Premier League	37	0	0	0	5	0	—		—		42	0
Newcastle United	2023–24	Premier League	15	0	0	0	1	0	5 (Note: Appearances in UEFA Champions League)	0	—		21	0
Newcastle United	2024–25	Premier League	28	0	1	0	3	0	—		—		32	0
Newcastle United	2025–26	Premier League	27	0	0	0	1	0	8	0	—		36	0
Newcastle United	Total		107	0	1	0	10	0	13	0	—		131	0
Career total			379	0	9	0	20	0	14	0	12	0	434	0

=== International ===
As of match played 26 September 2022

Appearances and goals by national team and year
National team	Year	Apps	Goals
England	2018	1	0
England	2019	1	0
England	2020	2	0
England	2021	3	0
England	2022	3	0
Total		10	0

== Honours ==
Newcastle United

- EFL Cup: 2024–25

Individual

- PFA Team of the Year: 2019–20 Premier League
- Burnley Player of the Year: 2017–18, 2019–20
- Burnley Players' Player of the Year: 2017–18, 2019–20
- Premier League Save of the Month: August 2022, January 2023
