= Abbey Aid =

The Abbey Aid 2006 Logo

Abbey Aid was an open-air pop concert held at the Abbey Stadium, Cambridge, England in May 2006. It was the first of its kind in Cambridge, targeting pop fans as opposed to the more established Cambridge Folk Festival which targets a substantially different audience. It was a huge flop.

== History ==
As the name suggests, Abbey Aid was originally designed as a fundraising project to help see Cambridge United F.C. through a tough economic situation that had existed for many years, but came to a head in the summer of 2005, when debts escalated to an unmanageable level forcing the Club into administration. To help the club through what looked like being a long summer (as source of income virtually dry up during this non-playing time for most football clubs), the club started to arrange a concert to be held at its stadium over the first weekend in July 2005.

The original nature of this concert was that it would be three sessions long, starting on the Friday night with a 'Party on the Pitch' followed by a series of local bands performing on the Saturday afternoon and culminating in a pop concert on Saturday evening. Due to the club's precarious financial state preparations for the concert progressed at an extraordinarily fast rate considering the total lack of experience of the organisers in this field; logistics were arranged, local acts booked and a headline act found in the shape of pop artist Natasha Bedingfield.

However, just when the concerts seemed to be heading in the right direction, the unlikely stumbling block of world poverty halted progress. With the G8 summit at Gleneagles scheduled for the week following the concerts, the nation's media had focussed on the growing campaign to focus these talks on ending world poverty, and taking this lead Bob Geldof et al. had organised a series of concerts around the world under the banner of Live 8 for the same weekend as Abbey Aid. Despite initially claiming that the concerts would carry on regardless, after poor ticket sales the event was eventually cancelled/postponed citing support for the Live 8 concerts as part reasoning.

Abbey Aid was rescheduled and took place from 26 to 27 May (under the banner 'Party on the Pitch'), with the following acts playing:

- Kings of Queen
- Chico
- Journey South
- Lee Ryan
- Liberty X

The concert had a capacity of 7,000 despite the stadium's larger capacity, as all tickets were to stand on the pitch. None of the stands at the ground were in operation due to the club's failure to gain a safety certificate for the concert due to the way they were constructed for football matches rather than pop concerts. In the end this was a moot point as only around 1,000 paying spectators attended each concert, well short of the organisers' expectations, and the event ended up losing money.
