= Abbey Stadium =

Homeground for Cambridge United F.C

Coordinates: 52.2121°N 0.15415°E

- The Abbey
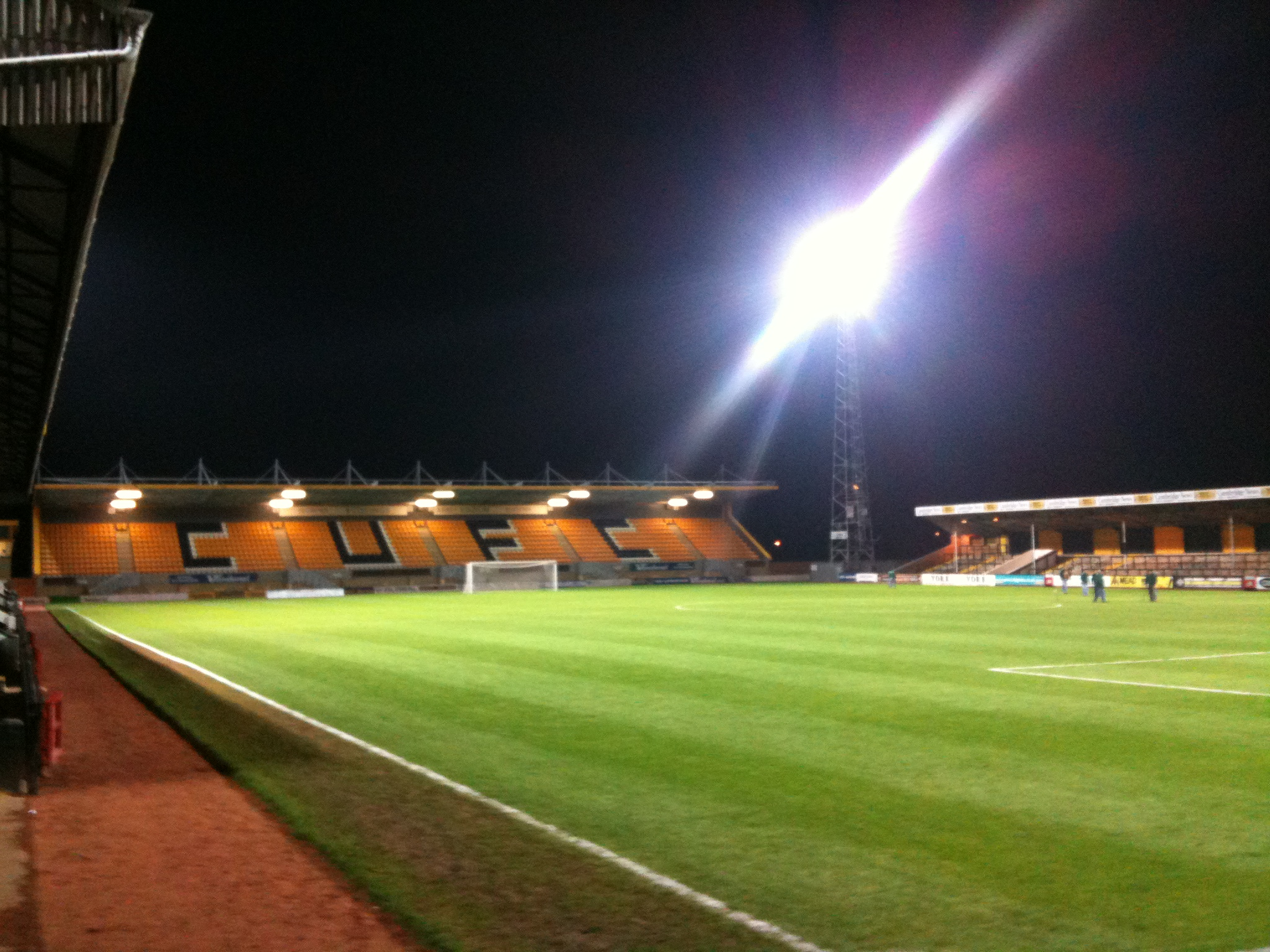
- Interactive map of Abbey Stadium
- Full name: Abbey Stadium
- Location: Cambridge, England
- Owner: Cambridge United F.C.
- Operator: Cambridge United F.C.
- Capacity: 7,937 (4,321 seated)
- Surface: Grass
- Field size: 110 x 74 yards

Construction
- Built: 1932
- Opened: 31 August 1932

Tenants
- Cambridge United (1932–present); Cambridge Regional College (2006–2014)

The Abbey Stadium, currently known as the Cledara Abbey Stadium for sponsorship reasons, is a football stadium in Cambridge, England. It has been the home ground of Cambridge United since 1932, and currently has a maximum capacity of 7,937 spectators. Cambridge Regional College F.C., Cambridge United's feeder club, played their home games at The Abbey from 2006 until their dissolution in 2014.

The first match ever played at the Abbey was a friendly against a team from Cambridge University Press on 31 August 1932. The record attendance at the ground (14,000) was also for a friendly, against Chelsea to mark the first use of the ground's new floodlights on 1 May 1970. This was the first time an English League ground's record crowd had turned out to watch a friendly.

Until well into the modern era, the Abbey Stadium was the only Football League ground to be styled a stadium, and was second only to Wembley Stadium in so being named. However, more recent ground moves and name changes have meant that a number of league clubs now play at grounds styled stadiums. For sponsorship reasons, the ground was until 2017 officially named the Cambs Glass Stadium. For similar reasons it has also previously been named the Trade Recruitment Stadium, and the R Costings Abbey Stadium.

== History ==
Abbey United (as the club were then known) had moved to Parker's Piece at the start of the 1930–31 season. Despite the special significance of Parker's Piece in the history of football, it being the first place where the Cambridge Rules were played out, the lack of spectator capacity and disruption caused during games meant this move was not a successful one.

Henry Francis, then president of the club, offered United a lifeline in 1931 when he donated land he had acquired to the club, and erected a grandstand and changing rooms on it. This land, where United have been resident since, was close to the club's former Celery Trenches ground, where, with the approval of the Cambridgeshire FA, the club played while the new ground was being prepared. The first match at the newly constructed Abbey (though it was not known as this until 1961) was played on 31 August 1932 against Cambridge University Press. A grandstand was not opened until March 1934, and subsequent stands were constructed between a period of many years up until 1954 when the final terrace, on the west of the ground (now the Habbin Stand), was completed.

Much redevelopment has occurred since including the redevelopment of the main stand to include a roof and extra seating and, most recently, the erection of a new all-seated stand at the south of the ground to replace the original open terrace that had stood there since 1966. Despite planning permission being granted for further development, as part of the same scheme, at the north end of the ground (including an 86-bedroom hotel, retail space, new offices and a new supporters club), financial difficulties meant this has yet to be entered into. In the 1991–92 season, Cambridge were challenging for promotion to the forthcoming new Premier League and were faced with the prospect of changing Abbey Stadium into an all-seater venue, as all teams in the highest two divisions of the English league were obliged to be all-seater by 1994 due to the changes in legislation that followed the 1989 Hillsborough disaster. However, due to Cambridge's subsequent decline (they were back in the lowest division of the Football League within four years) the ground has changed very little since then, and with standing accommodation still permitted below the second tier of the Football League there has been little pressure to make the stadium all-seater and in 2001 the club's directors stated that it was their intention to retain standing accommodation for as long as they are at a level that will permit it.

The same financial difficulties meant the Abbey Stadium land, donated to the club by Henry Francis in 1931, was sold to then director John Howard's company Bideawhile 445 Ltd in December 2004. Although the club confirmed in January 2006 it had "reached an agreement in principle" to buy back the ground, this has not yet happened, but is seen as crucial in safeguarding its long-term financial security. Also in January 2006, John Howard announced plans to move out of the Abbey Stadium to a new purpose built stadium in Milton. These were criticised by fans as risking the club's identity by moving out of the city and, despite Howard describing them as "crucial" to the club's future, little else has been heard of them since.

In April 2008, the club announced that for the first time, the corporate naming rights in the stadium had been sold. Although the club's Chief Executive Norman Gautrey acknowledged that the fans would "mourn the passing" of the Abbey Stadium name, it was stated to be crucial to the club's finances given the high annual rent on the ground. Trade Recruitment began a five-year sponsorship deal on 1 May 2008 for a total fee of £250,000. In June 2009 a new deal was announced with St Ives-based legal firm R Costings, and the stadium became known as the R Costings Abbey Stadium.

In March 2010 Cambridge Fans United started a project to purchase the Abbey Stadium from Bideawhile 445 Ltd. The attempt was unsuccessful and the stadium was sold to Grosvenor Estates for £3.5m. Positive talks between the club and Grosvenor have resulted in a "significant" rent reduction from the annual £240,000 being paid to previous ground owners Bideawhile over the next three years. Cambridge United, Grosvenor and their development partners, Great Shelford-based Wrenbridge, have also shaken hands on a memorandum of understanding to consider options for a new community stadium in Cambridgeshire.

On 2 September 2022, a statement released by the club announced that investment from the club's owners had allowed it to purchase the ground back from Grosvenor, returning the ownership of the stadium to the club for the first time since 2004.

== Current stands ==
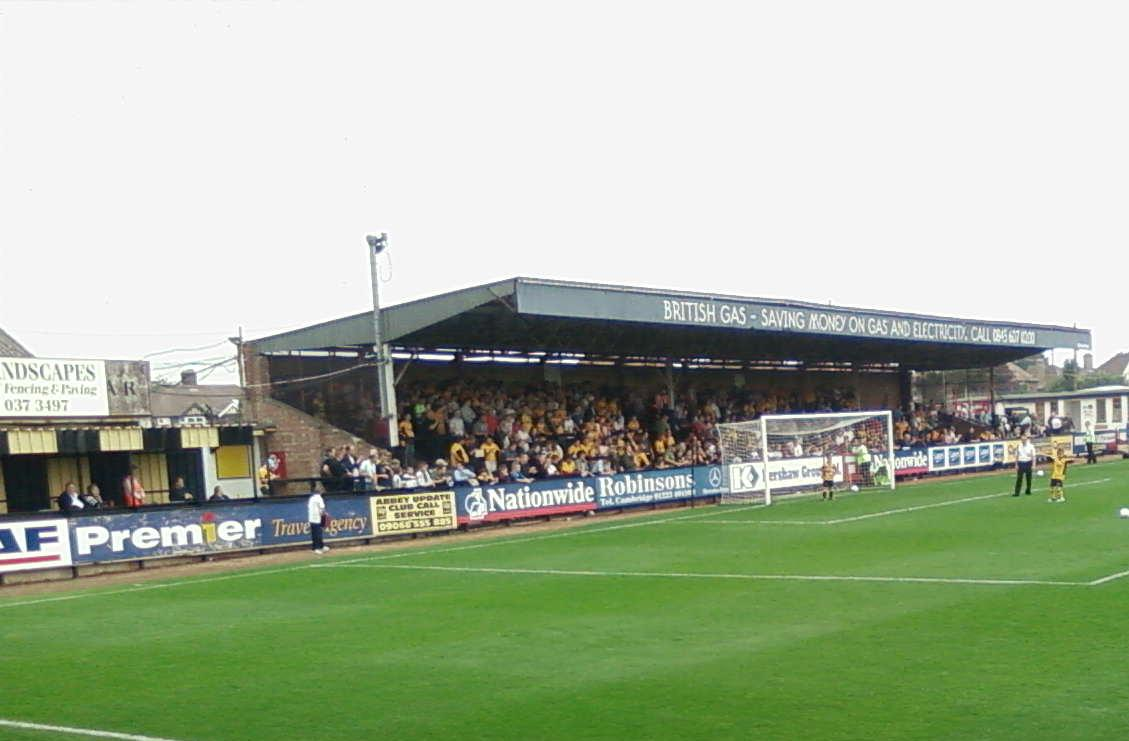
The North Terrace

- The Main Stand – a single-tier, all-seater stand running the length of the east side of the pitch including a family area, dugouts and media box.
- The Habbin Stand – a single-tier, all-terraced stand, opposite the Main Stand and named after Harry Habbin, a famous fan from the club's early days. The south third of this stand is occasionally opened for away fans.
- The North Terrace – a single-tier, all-terraced stand running three-quarters of one end of the pitch, known among fans as the Newmarket Road End as it backs onto Newmarket Road.
- The South Stand – a single-tier, all-seater stand, opened in 2002. This stand was primarily built to house away fans however it is often used to seat home supporters at ticket promotion matches. At the same time that the South Stand was constructed a new police control centre was built to the west of the stand. This building also houses emergency medical facilities for players and spectators. Through a sponsorship deal it is currently named the Mead Plant & Grab Stand, and has previously been named the Marston's Smooth Stand and the Heritage Conservatories Stand through similar commercial arrangements.

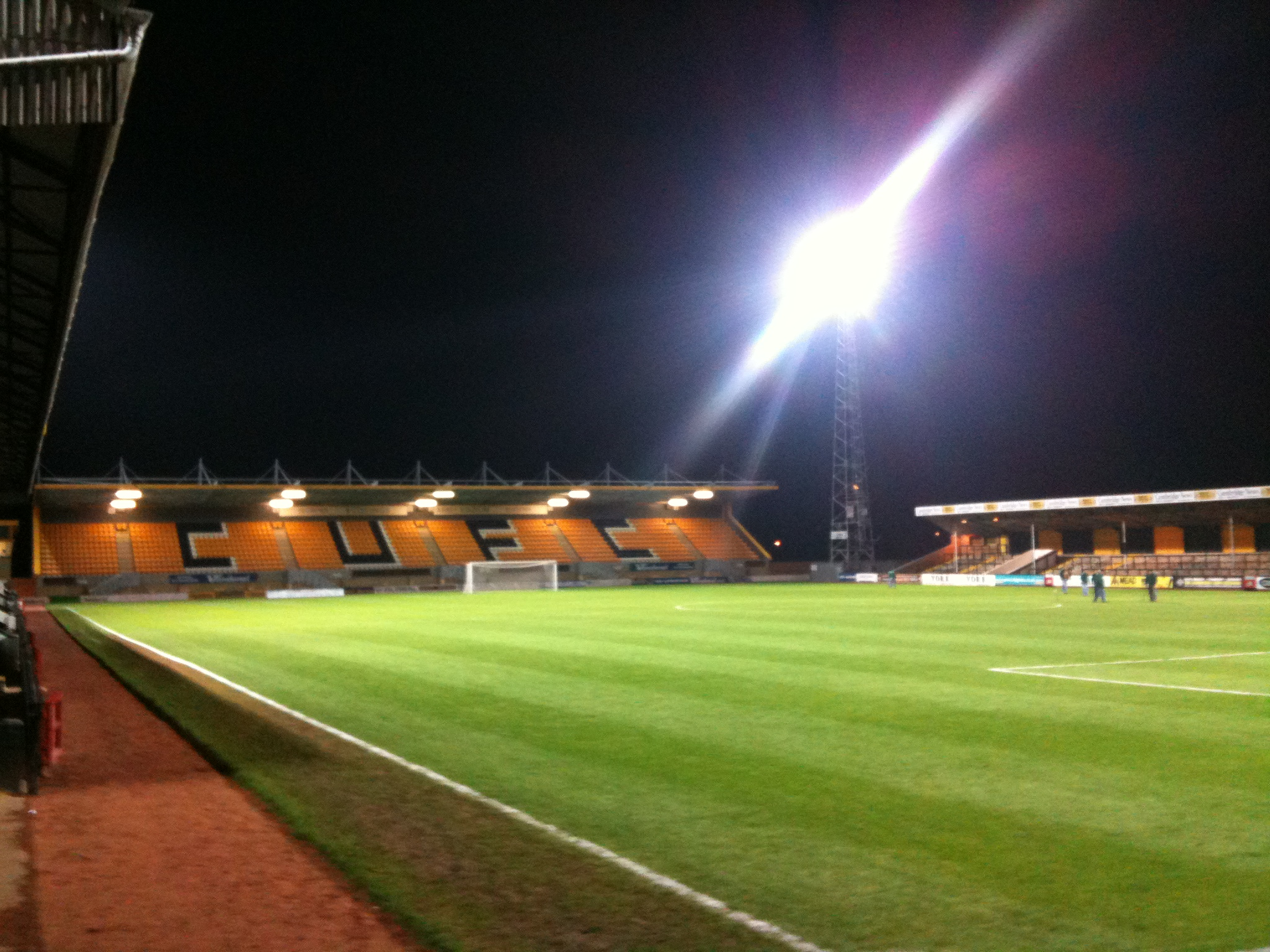
The South Stand at night

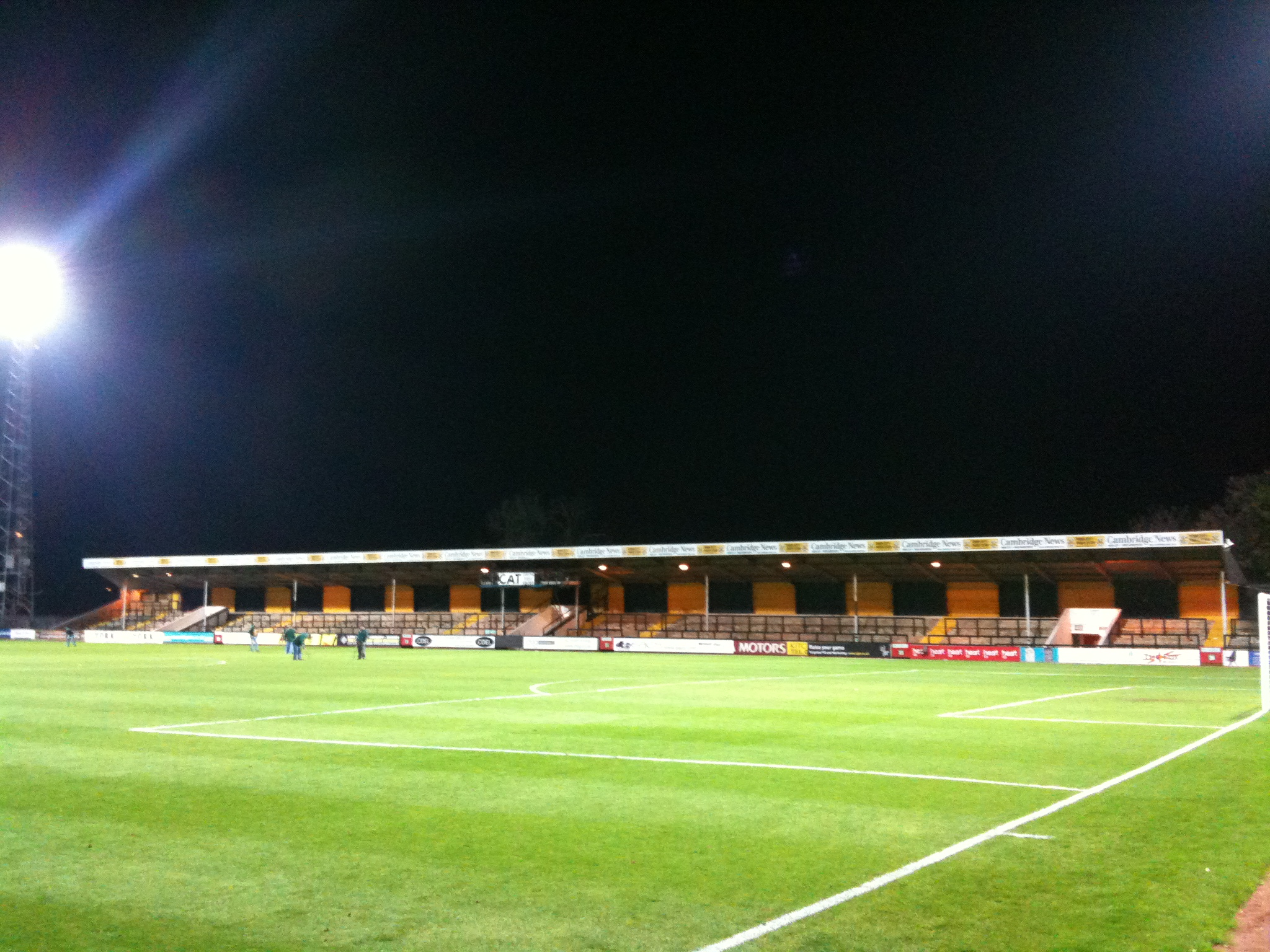
The Habbin Terrace

The club planned to redevelop the ground (including building an all-seater stand on the North Terrace with new accommodation for the club's staff and incorporating a medium-sized hotel and new function room into the site), but after a series of financial crises, the club sold the ground in November 2004 to Bideawhile Ltd, a company partly owned by Cambridge United director John Howard, on a sale and lease back scheme for a reported £2 million. The club's supporters have since launched the Cambridge Community Stadium Trust, which is striving to buy back the ground, a step that is seen as necessary to secure the club's long-term financial security.

The stadium's frontage, often criticised for negatively portraying the stadium, was refurbished during June and July 2007. This involved recladding portacabins that serve as the club's offices and general maintenance of the stadium's car park. The following summer the rear wall of the Newmarket Road End was redecorated in amber with a black "Amber Army" motif, a term for the club's supporters.

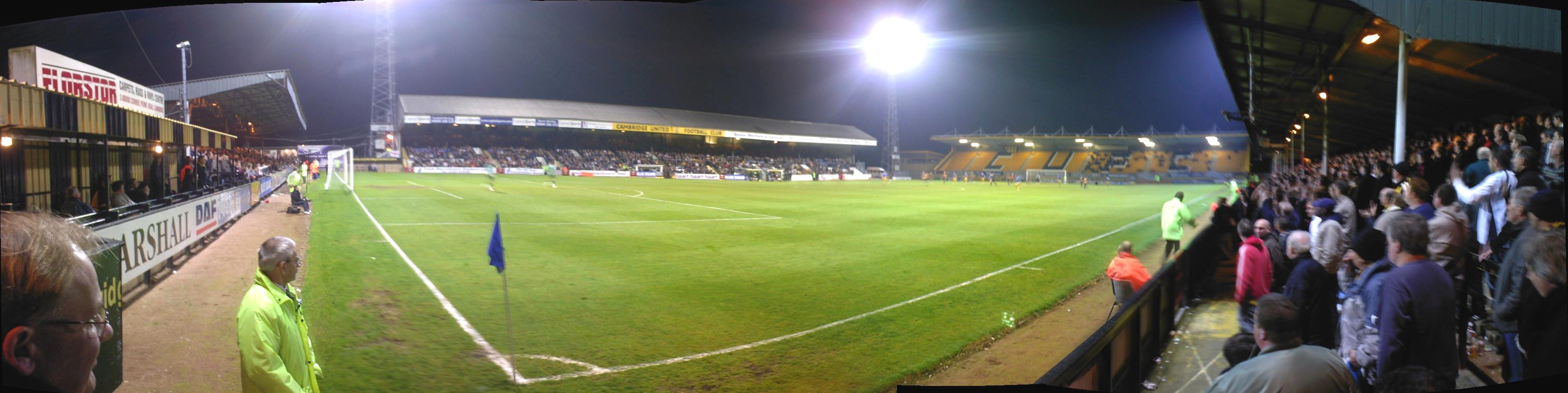
Abbey Stadium panorama.

== Non-football events ==
On Friday and Saturday 26–27 May 2006, the Abbey Stadium hosted Cambridge's first major outdoor pop concert under the title Abbey Aid. The capacity of the ground was, however, reduced for this event to around 7,000, all of which was standing accommodation on the pitch. This was due to a failure to gain a safety certificate for the ground's stands as they were built without dynamic loading protection, a necessary feature for stands at a music concert. However, the concerts only attracted approximately 1,000 paying spectators on each night, well short of the numbers the organisers had anticipated, and the events ended up losing money.

== Sources ==
- Ballard, J & Suff, P (1999). The Dictionary of Football. Boxtree. ISBN 0-7522-2434-4.
