= Cameron King (footballer) =

Footballer (born 1995)

Personal information
- Full name: Cameron Mark King
- Date of birth: 10 September 1995 (age 31)
- Place of birth: Bury St Edmunds, England
- Position: Midfielder

Team information
- Current team: Thetford Town

Youth career
- 2003–2014: Norwich City

Senior career*
Years	Team	Apps	(Gls)
2014–2016	Norwich City	0	(0)
2016–2017	Thetford Town	38	(15)
2017	Shamrock Rovers	8	(0)
2018	King's Lynn Town	11	(5)
2018–2020	FC Halifax Town	59	(8)
2020–2022	King's Lynn Town	22	(2)
2022–	Thetford Town	82	(37)

International career^{‡}
2014	Scotland U21	1	(1)
- * Club domestic league appearances and goals as of 02:43, 9 December 2024 ‡ National team caps and goals as of 19:23, 20 November 2014 (UTC)

Cameron Mark King (born 10 September 1995) is a semi-professional footballer who plays as a midfielder for Eastern Counties Premier Division side Thetford Town. Born in England, King represented Scotland internationally at youth level.

== Club career ==
King joined Norwich City's youth system at the age of eight. King made his senior début for Norwich City on 23 September 2014 in the League Cup in a 1–0 away loss to Shrewsbury Town.

In 2016 King and Norwich mutually agreed to end his contract early, in order for him to receive medical care for persistent migraines. After seeing a specialist, King returned to football with Thetford Town, where he scored 16 goals in 45 appearances in all competitions. King joined League of Ireland Premier Division side Shamrock Rovers on 14 August 2017.

On 24 August 2020, King re-signed for National League side Kings Lynn. King was released by the club following relegation at the end of the 2021–22 season.

He rejoined former club Thetford Town in June 2022, before extending his contract in May 2023 despite interest from teams in higher divisions.

== International career ==
King has represented Scotland at youth level. He scored a goal in his first appearance for the Scotland under-21s, a late equaliser in a 1–1 draw with Switzerland under-21s.

== Career statistics ==
As of end of 2021–22 season

Appearances and goals by club, season and competition
Club	Season	League			National cup		League cup		Other		Total	
Club	Season	Division	Apps	Goals	Apps	Goals	Apps	Goals	Apps	Goals	Apps	Goals
Norwich City	2014–15	Championship	0	0	0	0	1	0	0	0	1	0
Norwich City	2015–16	Premier League	0	0	0	0	0	0	—		0	0
Norwich City	Total		0	0	0	0	1	0	0	0	1	0
Thetford Town	2016–17	Eastern Counties League Premier Division	38	15	1	0	—		6 (Note: Three appearances in FA Vase; two appearances one goal in Norfolk Senior Cup; one appearance in Eastern Counties League Challenge Cup)	1	45	16
Shamrock Rovers	2017	League of Ireland Premier Division	8	0	2	0	1	0	0	0	11	0
King's Lynn Town	2017–18	Southern League Premier Division	11	5	0	0	—		2 (Note: Appearance(s) in Southern League Premier Division play-offs)	1	13	6
FC Halifax Town	2018–19	National League	28	1	5	1	—		2 (Note: Appearance(s) in FA Trophy)	0	35	2
FC Halifax Town	2019–20	National League	31	7	0	0	—		4 (Note: Three appearances in FA Trophy; one appearance in National League play-offs)	0	35	7
FC Halifax Town	Total		59	8	5	1	—		6	0	70	9
King's Lynn Town	2020–21	National League	22	2	1	0	—		1	0	24	2
King's Lynn Town	2021–22	National League	0	0	0	0	—		0	0	0	0
King's Lynn Town	Total		22	2	1	0	—		1	0	24	2
Career total			138	30	9	1	2	0	15	2	164	33
