= Newmarket Town F.C. =

Association football club in England

Coordinates: 52°14′21″N 0°24′41″E

Newmarket Town
- Full name: Newmarket Town Football Club
- Nickname: The Jockeys
- Founded: 1877
- Ground: Cricket Field Road, Newmarket
- Capacity: 2,750 (144 seated)
- Chairman: Jay Baldwin
- Manager: Michael Shinn
- League: Isthmian League North Division
- 2025–26: Isthmian League North Division, 15th of 22
- Website: newmarkettownfc.com
Home colours	Away colours

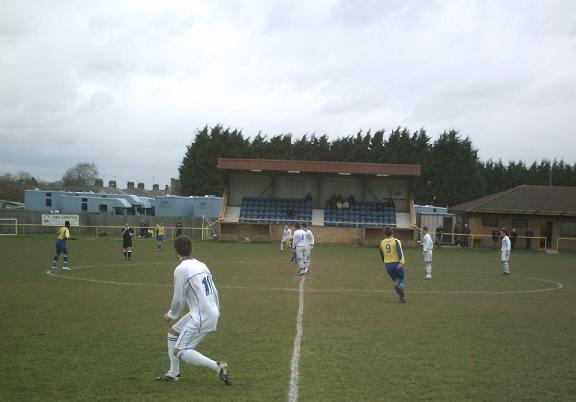
Cricket Field Road's main stand in 2008

Newmarket Town Football Club is a football club based in Newmarket, Suffolk, England. Affiliated to the Suffolk County FA, they are currently members of the Isthmian League North Division and play at Cricket Field Road.

== History ==
The club was formed at a meeting at the Star Hotel on 22 November 1877. Their first game was played against Pembroke College on 1 February 1878, losing 3–0. After World War I the club were playing in Division One of the Cambridgeshire League. They won the league title and the Cambridgeshire Senior Cup in 1919–20. However, they left the league in 1922. They joined Division One of the Suffolk & Ipswich League, but left after a single season to play in the Bury & District League. After winning the Cambridgeshire Challenge Cup in 1925–26, the club won Division One of the Bury & District League in 1926–27.

In 1928 Newmarket returned to Division One of the Ipswich & District League, winning the title in 1929–30 and 1933–34, after which they left the league again to join the United Counties League. They won the Suffolk Senior Cup in 1934–35, beating Kirkley 3–1 in the final. In 1937 the club joined the Eastern Counties League, finishing bottom of the league in their first season in the competition. During World War II they played in the East Anglian League, with Stan Mortensen guesting for them, before returning to the Eastern Counties League in 1946. They finished bottom of the league again in 1947–48 and went on to finish bottom of the table in each of the next four seasons, before leaving the league at the end of the 1951–52 season, which had seen them lose all 34 league matches, conceding 171 goals.

Newmarket joined the Peterborough & District League in 1956 and won the Premier Division title in 1957–58. They returned to the Eastern Counties League in 1959. They were runners-up in the league in 1966–67, but finished bottom of the table in 1971–72 and 1978–79. When the league gained a second division in 1988, the club became members of the Premier Division. During the 1990s Newmarket had much success in the Suffolk Premier Cup, winning the trophy in 1993–94, 1994–95, 1995–96 and 1998–99.

In 2007–08 Newmarket finished in the bottom two in the Premier Division and were relegated to Division One. Although they won Division One the following season and were promoted back to the Premier Division, they were relegated again at the end of the 2011–12 season. The club were Division One runners-up in 2012–13 and were promoted back to the Premier Division at the first attempt. They went on to win the League Cup the following season. In 2023–24 the club were Premier Division runners-up, qualifying for the promotion play-offs. After beating Dereham Town 3–1 in the semi-finals, they defeated Mulbarton Wanderers 2–0 in the final to earn promotion to the North Division of the Isthmian League.

== Ground ==
The club's first match was played at the Severals. However, their first permanent home ground was the Heath near Sefton Lodge, where they played until moving to Cricket Field Road in 1885. The first game at the Cricket Field was played on 21 October 1885 against Bury School. The record attendance of 2,701 was set for an FA Cup first qualifying round match against Abbey United on 1 October 1949. Floodlights were erected in 1985 and a 144-seat stand was installed in 1996. An artificial pitch was installed in 2016 and inaugurated with a friendly match against Cambridge United which attracted a crowd of 1,827.

== Honours ==
- Eastern Counties League
  - Division One champions 2008–09
  - League Cup winners 2013–14
- Bury & District League
  - Champions 1926–27
- Cambridgeshire League
  - Champions 1919–20
- Peterborough & District League
  - Champions 1957–58
- Suffolk & Ipswich League
  - Champions 1931–32, 1932–33, 1933–34
- Cambridgeshire Senior Cup
  - Winners 1919–20
- Cambridgeshire Challenge Cup
  - Winners 1925–26
- Suffolk Senior Cup
  - Winners 1934–35
- Suffolk Premier Cup
  - Winners 1994, 1995, 1996, 1999

== Records ==
- Best FA Cup performance: Fourth qualifying round, 1992–93
- Best FA Trophy performance: Second round, 2026–27
- Best FA Vase performance: Quarter-finals, 2005–06
- Record attendance: 2,701 vs Abbey United, FA Cup, 1 October 1949

== See also ==
- Newmarket Town F.C. players
- Newmarket Town F.C. managers
