= Debenham LC F.C. =

Association football club in England

Coordinates: 52°13′20.91″N 1°10′10.71″E

Debenham LC
- Full name: Debenham Leisure Centre Football Club
- Nickname: The Hornets
- Founded: 1991 (as Debenham Angels)
- Ground: The Hornets Nest, Debenham
- Capacity: 1,000
- Chairman: Andy Bloomfield
- Manager: Mark Peck
- League: Suffolk & Ipswich League Premier Division
- 2025–26: Suffolk & Ipswich League Premier Division, 8th of 16
- Website: www.debenhamlcfc.co.uk
Home colours

Debenham Leisure Centre Football Club is a football club based in the village of Debenham, in Suffolk, England. The club are currently members of the Suffolk & Ipswich League Premier Division and play at The Hornets Nest.

== History ==
The club was founded as Debenham Angels in 1991 and joined Division Seven of the Suffolk & Ipswich League. After an unbeaten first season, they won the division and were promoted to Division Six. In 1993–94 they were promoted again to Division Five. They were renamed AFC Debenham in 1994. They were promoted to Division Four at the end of the 1995–96 season. The club won Division Four at the first attempt, and were promoted to Division Three, which they won in 1999–2000. In 2000–01 the club were promoted to Division One. However, after missing out on promotion to the Senior Division in 2001–02, the following season they narrowly avoided being relegated back to Division Two in 2002–03. After Mel Aldis was appointed manager in the summer of 2003, the club won Division One in 2003–04 to earn promotion to the Senior Division. The title was claimed following a 10–0 win against Ipswich Exiles to overtake Framlingham Town on goal difference.

In their first season in the Senior Division, Debenham finished runners-up to East Bergholt United, and were promoted to Division One of the Eastern Counties League. Upon moving up the club adopted their current name. In 2008-09 they were promoted to the Premier Division, after winning 7–0 at March Town United on the final day of the season to pip Halstead Town to third place on goal difference, having needed to win by three goals and hope Halstead failed to win (they drew 1–1 with Great Yarmouth Town). They were relegated back to Division One after finishing bottom of the Premier Division in 2010–11. In 2013–14 the club won the Division One Knockout Cup, beating Whitton United 2–0 in the final. They finished bottom of Division One in 2022–23 and were relegated to the Senior Division of the Suffolk & Ipswich League.

== Honours ==
- Eastern Counties League
  - Division One Knockout Cup winners 2013–14
- Suffolk & Ipswich League
  - Division One champions 2003–04
  - Division Three champions 1999–2000
  - Division Four champions 1996–97
  - Division Seven champions 1991–92

== Records ==
- Best FA Cup performance: Second qualifying round, 2007–08
- Best FA Vase performance: Second round, 2008–09
- Record attendance: 1,026 vs AFC Wimbledon, FA Cup second qualifying round, 29 September 2007
- Most appearances: Steve Nelson
- Most goals: Lee Briggs
