= Cambridge University Press F.C. =

Association football club in England

Coordinates: 52.186451°N 0.12796551°E

Cambridge University Press
- Full name: Cambridge University Press Football Club
- Nickname: Press
- Founded: 1893
- Ground: Cass Centre, Cambridge
- Chairman: Ian Croft
- Manager: Alex Kaufman
- 2024–25: Cambridgeshire League Premier Division, 9th of 13
Home colours	Away colours

Cambridge University Press Football Club is a football club based in Cambridge, England. They play home matches at the Cass Centre.

== History ==
The club was established in 1893, and won its first major trophy, the Cambridgeshire Senior Cup, in 1914. They won Division Two of the Cambridgeshire League in 1928–29, Division One in 1930–31, and the Premier Division in 1934–35.

Following relegations, in 1967–68, Cambridge University Press won Division 2B. The Cambridgeshire Junior Cup was won in 1986, and Division 2A in 1992–93. They won the Senior B division in 2003–04, and were promoted to the Premier Division in 2004–05 after finishing second in the Senior A division. They won the Premier League Cup in 2007–08. After finishing as runners-up in the Premier Division in 2009–10, the club were promoted to Division One of the Eastern Counties League.

In 2011 Cambridge University Press moved its home games to Histon's Bridge Road ground, as they were unable to erect floodlights at the Cass Centre. Despite winning Division One in 2012–13, the club left the league in order to return to the Cass Centre, returning to the Premier Division of the Cambridgeshire League. In 2014–15 they finished second-from-bottom of the Premier Division, and were relegated to the Senior A Division. The 2016–17 season saw them finish as runners-up in the division, resulting in promotion back to the Premier Division. In 2021–22 the club won the Premier Division Cup, beating Eaton Socon 4–2 on penalties after a 3–3 draw (in which they recovered from being 3–0 down in the 87th minute).

The club withdrew from the Cambridgeshire County League at the end of the 2024–25 season.

== Colours and badge ==
Cambridge University Press play in traditional 'Cambridge Blue' with sky blue shirts, navy blue shorts and sky blue socks. Their change strip is all yellow. The club badge is the crest of Cambridge University Press, which is also the crest of the University of Cambridge.

== Honours ==
- Eastern Counties League
  - Division One champions 2012–13
- Cambridgeshire Football Association County League
  - Premier Division champions 1934–35
  - Premier Division Cup winners 2007–08, 2021–22
  - Senior B champions 2003–04
  - Division One champions 1930–31
  - Division Two champions 1928–29
  - Division 2A champions 1992–93
  - Division 2B champions 1967–68
- Cambridgeshire Senior Cup
  - Winners 1914
- Cambridgeshire Junior Cup
  - Winners 1986

== Records ==
- Best FA Vase performance: Second round, 2012–13

== See also ==
- Cambridge University Press F.C. players
