= Cambridge Regional College F.C. =

Coordinates: 52.21136°N 0.15300°E

Cambridge Regional College
- Full name: Cambridge Regional College Football Club
- Nickname: The Scholars
- Founded: 2006
- Dissolved: 2014
- Ground: Abbey Stadium, Cambridge
- 2013–14: Eastern Counties League; Premier Division, 14th (resigned)
Home colours	Away colours

Cambridge Regional College Football Club was a football club based in Cambridge, England. The club were members of the Eastern Counties League and played at the Abbey Stadium.

== History ==
The club was formed for the start of the 2006–07 season acting as a feeder club, youth academy and reserve team for Cambridge United. Although all players were officially registered as Cambridge Regional College players, many were also part of Cambridge United's Youth Academy, and transfer rules allowed first team players for Cambridge United to move on loan throughout the season.

The club started 2006–07 in the Eastern Counties League Premier Division, inheriting the position previously occupied by Cambridge City reserves. They were Premier Division runners-up in 2008–09 and again in 2009–10.

In January 2014 it was announced that the club would be disbanded at the end of the 2013–14 season. The club folded in May, but its youth development system will continue to function.

== Records ==
- Best FA Vase performance: Third round, 2009–10

== See also ==
- Cambridge Regional College F.C. players
- Cambridge Regional College F.C. managers
