= Great Yarmouth Town F.C. =

Association football club in England

Coordinates: 52°36′45″N 1°44′10″E

Great Yarmouth Town
- Full name: Great Yarmouth Town Football Club
- Nickname: The Bloaters
- Founded: 20 July 1897
- Ground: Wellesley Recreation Ground, Great Yarmouth
- Capacity: 3,600 (500 seated)
- Chairman: Martyn Sinclair
- Manager: Chris Brownbridge
- League: Eastern Counties League Premier Division
- 2025–26: Eastern Counties League Premier Division, 8th of 18
- Website: gytfc.co.uk
Home colours	Away colours

Great Yarmouth Town Football Club is a football club based in Great Yarmouth, Norfolk, England. They are currently members of the Eastern Counties League Premier Division and play at the Wellesley Recreation Ground, whose grandstand is believed to be the world's oldest football stand still in regular use, having been opened on 11 June 1892. The club is affiliated to the Norfolk County FA.

== History ==
The club was established on 20 July 1897, taking most of their players from two local clubs, Yarmouth Fearnoughts and Yarmouth Royal Artillery, which between them, had won the Norfolk Senior Cup for the previous four years running. The new club were founder members of the Norfolk & Suffolk League in 1897, and in their first season in existence, they won the Norfolk Senior Cup, beating Lynn Town 4–3 in a replay after a 0–0 draw in the first match. They won the cup again in 1901–02 and retained it in each of the next four seasons, each time defeating Lynn Town in the final. They finished bottom of the Norfolk & Suffolk League in 1903–04, and in 1908–09 the club also entered a team into the East Anglian League, finishing bottom of the table. They finished bottom of the East Anglian League again the following season, but were runners-up in 1911–12 and 1912–13.

Great Yarmouth were expelled from the Norfolk & Suffolk League during the 1912–13 season, but after being reinstated during the close season, the club were league champions in 1913–14. They withdrew from the East Anglian League in 1920. The club won back-to-back Norfolk & Suffolk League titles in 1926–27 and 1927–28, and were runners-up in 1929–30 and 1933–34. In 1935 they were founder members of the Eastern Counties League, and won the League Cup in 1938. In the 1947–48 season the club reached the first round of the FA Cup for the first time, but lost 4–1 at home to Shrewsbury Town in front of a crowd of 4,160. In 1951–52 they won the East Anglian Cup, and the following season saw them reach the FA Cup first round again, beating Guildford City 1–0 in a replay after a 2–2 draw, before losing 4–1 at home to Wrexham in front of a new record attendance of 6,963. They reached the second round again the following season, beating Crystal Palace 1–0 before another record crowd of 8,944, before losing 5–2 at Barrow.

After finishing as league runners-up in 1956–57 and 1967–68, Great Yarmouth won the Eastern Counties League for the first, and to date only, time in 1968–69 under the management of Jimmy Moran. Former Norwich City player Bill Punton took over as manager, and in a 21-year spell in charge (making him the club's longest serving manager), they won the League Cup again in 1974–75 and 1980–81, the Norfolk Senior Cup four times, as well as finishing as league runners-up twice and FA Vase semi-finalists in 1982–83, losing in extra-time to VS Rugby in front of a crowd of 4,552.

In 1988 the Eastern Counties League gained a second division, with Great Yarmouth placed in the Premier Division. They won the league's Millennium Trophy in 2002–03, and remained in the Premier Division until being relegated to Division One at the end of the 2004–05 season. They won Division One in 2009–10, earning promotion back to the Premier Division. However, they were relegated again two seasons later. A third-place finish in Division One in 2015–16 saw the club promoted back to the Premier Division. In 2018–19 they finished second-from-bottom of the Premier Division and were relegated to Division One North. The 2023–24 season saw the club win Division One North, earning promotion back to the Premier Division.

== Ground ==
Great Yarmouth Town initially played at the Beaconsfield Recreation Ground before moving to the Wellesey Recreation Ground at the start of the 1901–02 season. The Wellesley Recreation Ground had opened on 6 August 1888, with the first event, cycle races on a cinder track, watched by a crowd of around 3,000. Cricket pitches and a tennis court were also created in the ground, with the first football match at the ground thought to have been on 11 April 1890 when a County Captain's team played a Yarmouth XI. After fundraising started in 1891, a new grandstand was erected the following year and opened on 11 June 1892 for a joint athletics and cycling meeting watched by around 4,200 spectators. The stand was given Grade II listed building status in 2000.

Norfolk County Cricket Club played two Minor Counties Championship matches on the ground in 1898 and 1899. The club used the ground for other matches in the period before World War I, including three fixtures against MCC.

Concrete terracing and cover was installed on the western side of the pitch in 1931. The record attendance of 8,944 was set on 21 November 1953 for an FA Cup first round match against Crystal Palace. Floodlights were installed in 1983 and inaugurated in a friendly match against Ipswich Town on 7 October.

== Honours ==
- Eastern Counties League
  - Champions 1968–69
  - Division One champions 2009–10
  - Division One North champions 2023–24
  - League Cup winners 1937–38, 1974–75, 1980–81
  - Millennium Trophy winners 2002–03
- Norfolk & Suffolk League
  - Champions 1913–14, 1926–27, 1927–28
- Norfolk Senior Cup
  - Winners 1897–98, 1902–03, 1903–04, 1904–05, 1905–06, 1928–29, 1929–30, 1961–62, 1964–65, 1978–79, 1979–80, 1984–85, 1989–90
- East Anglian Cup
  - Winners 1951–52

== Records ==
- Best FA Cup performance: Second round, 1952–53, 1953–54
- Best FA Trophy performance: Third qualifying round, 1969–70
- Best FA Vase performance: Semi-finals, 1982–83
- Record attendance: 8,944 vs Crystal Palace, FA Cup first round, 21 November 1953
- Most appearances: Mark Vincent, 700 (1984–2005)
- Most goals: Gordon South, 298 (1927–1947)

== See also ==
- Great Yarmouth Town F.C. players
- Great Yarmouth Town F.C. managers
