= Thetford Town F.C. =

Association football club in England

Coordinates: 52°25′14.85″N 0°44′49.07″E

Thetford Town
- Full name: Thetford Town Football Club
- Nickname: The Brecklanders
- Founded: 1883
- Ground: Mundford Road, Thetford
- Chairman: Nigel Armes
- Manager: Matt Morton
- League: Eastern Counties League Premier Division
- 2025–26: Eastern Counties League Premier Division, 6th of 18
- Website: www.thetfordtownfc.com
Home colours	Away colours

Thetford Town Football Club is an English football club based in Thetford, Norfolk. The club are currently members of the Eastern Counties League Premier Division and play at Mundford Road. The club is affiliated to the Norfolk County FA.

== History ==
The club was established in 1883 and moved to its current ground on Mundford Road in 1905. They played in the Norwich and District League until World War I, but due to the town's position on the Norfolk-Suffolk border, the club could enter cups in both counties, and in 1911 were victorious in the Suffolk Junior Cup final.

After the war they played in leagues in the Norfolk & Suffolk League until becoming founder members of the Eastern Counties League in 1935. However, they finished bottom in both 1935–36 and 1936–37 and rejoined the Norfolk & Suffolk League in 1937. In 1948 they won the Norfolk Senior Cup, and after finishing as league runners-up in 1951–52, 1952–53 and 1953–54, they were league champions in 1954–55.

In 1963 the club rejoined the Eastern Counties League. However, they never finished higher than fifth, and were bottom in both 1983–84 and 1984–85. In 1989–90 the club finished as runners-up in the Premier Division. Although they won the Norfolk Senior Cup final the following season, in 1991–92 they were relegated to Division One after finishing bottom. The club finished bottom of Division One in 1998–99 and 1999–2000, but were not relegated.

In 2011–12, the club finished second behind Godmanchester Rovers on goal difference in Division One and were promoted to the Premier Division.

Thetford finished 7th in the 2016–17 season, the team's highest finish in 26 years.

The next two seasons saw Thetford finish just below mid-table, following inconsistent campaigns, however they reached a cup final in each season, firstly losing to Brantham Athletic in the Thurlow Nunn Challenge Cup, and then in the Norfolk Senior Cup final to Dereham Town.

== Stadium ==
The club play their home games at Mundford Road, adjacent to the Breckland Leisure Centre & Waterworld complex.

== Current squad ==
As of 9 December 2024

Note: Flags indicate national team as defined under FIFA eligibility rules; some limited exceptions apply. Players may hold more than one non-FIFA nationality.

Pos.	Nation	Player
GK	ENG	Ryan Dickerson
GK	ENG	Tom Smith
DF	ENG	Sam Bond (captain)
DF	ENG	Ryan Haylett
DF	ENG	Adam Laker
DF	ENG	Jaydyn Lott
DF	ENG	Josh Wells
MF	ENG	Dylan Grove
MF	SCO	Cameron King

Pos.	Nation	Player
MF	ENG	Harvey Lott
MF	ENG	Jake Mann
MF	ENG	Kieran Money
MF	ENG	Callum Olpin
MF	ENG	Elliot Smith
FW	ENG	Jordan Buttle
FW	ENG	George Diggens
FW	ENG	Dan Gilchrist

The Eastern Counties Football League does not use a squad numbering system.

== Honours ==
- Norfolk & Suffolk League
  - Champions 1954–55
- Suffolk Junior Cup
  - Winners 1910–11
- Norfolk Senior Cup
  - Winners 1947–48, 1990–91

== Records ==
- Best FA Cup – performance: Second qualifying round, 1954–55, 1970–71, 1971–72 (replay), 1972–73, 1973–74, 1975–76
- Best FA Vase performance: Fourth round, 1990–91
- Attendance: 394 vs Diss Town, Norfolk Senior Cup, 1991
