= 1990–91 Eastern Counties Football League =

The 1990–91 season was the 49th in the history of Eastern Counties Football League a football competition in England.

Wisbech Town were champions, winning their third Eastern Counties Football League title, while Braintree Town were promoted to the Southern Football League for the first time in their history.

== Premier Division ==
Eastern Counties Football League Premier Division
- Season: 1990–91
- Champions: Wisbech Town
- Promoted: Braintree Town
- Matches: 420
- Goals: 1,293 (3.08 per match)

The Premier Division featured 20 clubs which competed in the division last season, along with one new club, promoted from Division One:

- Cornard United

=== League table ===
Pos	Team	Pld	W	D	L	GF	GA	GD	Pts	Promotion or relegation
1	Wisbech Town	40	27	10	3	97	39	+58	91	
2	Braintree Town	40	25	10	5	85	38	+47	85	Promoted to the Southern Football League
3	Halstead Town	40	26	4	10	105	52	+53	82	
4	Haverhill Rovers	40	24	8	8	82	45	+37	80	
5	Harwich & Parkeston	40	23	4	13	85	51	+34	73	
6	Watton United	40	20	10	10	62	50	+12	70	
7	Wroxham	40	17	13	10	63	64	−1	64	
8	Cornard United	40	16	12	12	73	59	+14	60	
9	Lowestoft Town	40	16	12	12	56	51	+5	60	
10	Histon	40	17	7	16	55	53	+2	58	
11	Stowmarket Town	40	15	11	14	51	52	−1	56	
12	Clacton Town	40	15	9	16	64	56	+8	54	
13	Felixstowe Town	40	14	11	15	59	58	+1	53	
14	Thetford Town	40	14	10	16	65	81	−16	52	
15	March Town United	40	12	9	19	48	62	−14	45	
16	Tiptree United	40	12	6	22	45	65	−20	42	
17	Gorleston	40	11	5	24	53	74	−21	38	
18	Great Yarmouth Town	40	9	6	25	43	90	−47	32 (Note: Great Yarmouth Town were deducted one point.)	
19	Brantham Athletic	40	6	9	25	41	74	−33	27	
20	Newmarket Town	40	6	8	26	32	87	−55	26	
21	Chatteris Town	40	5	6	29	29	92	−63	21	

Source: fchd
Rules for classification: 1) points; 2) goal difference; 3) number of goals scored.

== Division One ==
Eastern Counties Football League Division One
- Season: 1990–91
- Champions: Norwich United
- Promoted: Norwich United; Brightlingsea United
- Matches: 342
- Goals: 1,076 (3.15 per match)

Division One featured 16 clubs which competed in the division last season, along with three new clubs:

- Brightlingsea United, transferred from the Essex Senior League
- Sudbury Town reserves
- Swaffham Town, joined from the Anglian Combination

Also, Coalite Yaxley changed name to Clarksteel Yaxley.

=== League table ===
Pos	Team	Pld	W	D	L	GF	GA	GD	Pts	Promotion
1	Norwich United	36	26	6	4	65	19	+46	84	Promoted to the Premier Division
2	Brightlingsea United	36	24	5	7	77	38	+39	77	Promoted to the Premier Division
3	Fakenham Town	36	22	8	6	70	35	+35	74	
4	Diss Town	36	19	11	6	74	32	+42	68	
5	Downham Town	36	21	5	10	89	52	+37	68	
6	Soham Town Rangers	36	20	7	9	66	46	+20	67	
7	Long Sutton Athletic	36	16	9	11	54	43	+11	57	
8	Woodbridge Town	36	17	6	13	54	45	+9	57	
9	Ely City	36	16	7	13	54	44	+10	55	
10	Clarksteel Yaxley	36	15	7	14	46	51	−5	52	
11	Somersham Town	36	14	4	18	64	59	+5	46	
12	Sudbury Town reserves	36	10	14	12	61	57	+4	44	
13	Ipswich Wanderers	36	11	10	15	56	57	−1	43	
14	King's Lynn reserves	36	13	4	19	59	74	−15	43	
15	Swaffham Town	36	10	6	20	42	65	−23	35 (Note: Swaffham Town were deducted one point.)	
16	Huntingdon United	36	8	9	19	42	70	−28	33	
17	Mildenhall Town	36	5	7	24	39	100	−61	22	
18	Bury Town reserves	36	3	8	25	25	78	−53	17	
19	Warboys Town	36	4	3	29	39	111	−72	15	

Source: fchd
Rules for classification: 1) points; 2) goal difference; 3) number of goals scored.
