= 1975–76 Eastern Counties Football League =

The 1975–76 Eastern Counties Football League was the 34th season in the history of the Eastern Counties Football League.

Defending champions Sudbury Town won the league, securing their third Eastern Counties Football League title.

== League table ==
Eastern Counties Football League
- Season: 1975–76
- Champions: Sudbury Town
- Matches played: 342
- Goals scored: 1,160 (3.39 per match)

Pos	Team	Pld	W	D	L	GF	GA	GAv	Pts	Promotion or relegation
1	Sudbury Town (C)	36	29	4	3	109	27	4.037	62	
2	Lowestoft Town	36	21	9	6	86	30	2.867	51	
3	Wisbech Town	36	22	7	7	84	39	2.154	51	
4	Braintree & Crittall	36	21	8	7	63	23	2.739	50	
5	Histon	36	18	12	6	77	46	1.674	48	
6	Great Yarmouth Town	36	19	8	9	65	38	1.711	46	
7	Clacton Town	36	18	8	10	66	43	1.535	44	
8	Gorleston	36	20	3	13	86	65	1.323	43	
9	Chatteris Town	36	18	4	14	69	73	0.945	40	
10	Stowmarket	36	12	10	14	56	53	1.057	34	
11	Saffron Walden Town	36	11	11	14	57	63	0.905	33	
12	Soham Town Rangers	36	12	6	18	52	75	0.693	30	
13	Newmarket Town	36	11	6	19	54	60	0.900	28	
14	Cambridge City reserves	36	10	5	21	48	77	0.623	25	Resigned from the league
15	Thetford Town	36	9	6	21	49	76	0.645	24	
16	Gothic	36	9	6	21	44	91	0.484	24	
17	March Town United	36	5	12	19	41	91	0.451	22	
18	Ely City	36	9	4	23	37	84	0.440	22	
19	Haverhill Rovers	36	1	5	30	17	106	0.160	7	

Source: rsssf.org
Rules for classification: 1) Points; 2) Goal average; 3) Goals scored
(C) Champions
