= 1992–93 Eastern Counties Football League =

The 1992–93 season was the 51st in the history of Eastern Counties Football League a football competition in England.

Wroxham were champions, winning their second Eastern Counties Football League title in a row.

== Premier Division ==
Eastern Counties Football League Premier Division
- Season: 1992–93
- Champions: Wroxham
- Relegated: Brantham Athletic; Brightlingsea United
- Matches: 462
- Goals: 1,457 (3.15 per match)

The Premier Division featured 20 clubs which competed in the division last season, along with two new clubs, promoted from Division One:

- Diss Town
- Fakenham Town

=== League table ===
Pos	Team	Pld	W	D	L	GF	GA	GD	Pts	Promotion or relegation
1	Wroxham	42	32	4	6	106	36	+70	100	
2	Wisbech Town	42	28	6	8	109	48	+61	90	
3	Newmarket Town	42	27	9	6	87	37	+50	90	
4	Cornard United	42	22	9	11	99	68	+31	75	
5	Diss Town	42	24	2	16	65	52	+13	74	
6	Harwich & Parkeston	42	20	10	12	75	51	+24	70	
7	Fakenham Town	42	19	10	13	68	50	+18	67	
8	Norwich United	42	16	14	12	66	57	+9	62	
9	Felixstowe Town	42	15	12	15	66	62	+4	57	
10	Gorleston	42	16	9	17	64	89	−25	57	
11	Great Yarmouth Town	42	16	8	18	41	62	−21	56	
12	Tiptree United	42	15	8	19	64	76	−12	53	
13	Stowmarket Town	42	14	9	19	54	59	−5	51	
14	Haverhill Rovers	42	14	8	20	65	80	−15	50	
15	Halstead Town	42	14	8	20	60	83	−23	50	
16	Chatteris Town	42	15	4	23	64	73	−9	49	
17	Lowestoft Town	42	12	12	18	55	56	−1	48	
18	March Town United	42	13	9	20	56	67	−11	48	
19	Watton United	42	12	8	22	51	84	−33	44	
20	Histon	42	10	13	19	60	90	−30	42 (Note: Histon were deducted one point.)	
21	Brantham Athletic	42	8	12	22	47	73	−26	36	Relegated to Division One
22	Brightlingsea United	42	2	12	28	35	104	−69	18	Relegated to Division One

Source: fchd
Rules for classification: 1) points; 2) goal difference; 3) number of goals scored.

== Division One ==
Eastern Counties Football League Division One
- Season: 1992–93
- Champions: Sudbury Wanderers
- Promoted: Sudbury Wanderers; Soham Town Rangers
- Matches: 342
- Goals: 1,356 (3.96 per match)

Division One featured 16 clubs which competed in the division last season, along with three new clubs:

- Clacton Town, relegated from the Premier Division
- Stanway Rovers, joined from the Essex and Suffolk Border League
- Thetford Town, relegated from the Premier Division

=== League table ===
Pos	Team	Pld	W	D	L	GF	GA	GD	Pts	Promotion
1	Sudbury Wanderers	36	26	5	5	96	37	+59	83	Promoted to the Premier Division
2	Soham Town Rangers	36	24	4	8	119	45	+74	76	Promoted to the Premier Division
3	Woodbridge Town	36	24	4	8	82	40	+42	76	
4	Hadleigh United	36	19	9	8	95	59	+36	66	
5	Clacton Town	36	20	6	10	78	53	+25	66	
6	Somersham Town	36	21	3	12	68	52	+16	66	
7	Cambridge City reserves	36	16	7	13	104	77	+27	55	
8	Ely City	36	14	11	11	59	48	+11	53	
9	Long Sutton Athletic	36	15	8	13	69	75	−6	53	
10	Stanway Rovers	36	15	6	15	73	76	−3	51	
11	Ipswich Wanderers	36	14	6	16	63	72	−9	48	
12	Mildenhall Town	36	14	5	17	76	98	−22	47	
13	Sudbury Town reserves	36	13	7	16	70	72	−2	46	
14	Warboys Town	36	10	12	14	63	72	−9	42	
15	King's Lynn reserves	36	11	5	20	49	63	−14	38	Resigned from the league
16	Downham Town	36	11	4	21	64	84	−20	37	
17	Swaffham Town	36	12	4	20	58	97	−39	34 (Note: Swaffham Town were deducted six points.)	
18	Bury Town reserves	36	6	1	29	46	122	−76	19	
19	Thetford Town	36	2	3	31	24	114	−90	9	

Source: fchd
Rules for classification: 1) points; 2) goal difference; 3) number of goals scored.
