= 1991–92 Eastern Counties Football League =

The 1991–92 season was the 50th in the history of Eastern Counties Football League a football competition in England.

Wroxham were champions, winning their first Eastern Counties Football League title.

== Premier Division ==
Eastern Counties Football League Premier Division
- Season: 1991–92
- Champions: Wroxham
- Relegated: Clacton Town; Thetford Town
- Matches: 462
- Goals: 1,484 (3.21 per match)

The Premier Division featured 20 clubs which competed in the division last season, along with two new clubs, promoted from Division One:

- Brightlingsea United
- Norwich United

=== League table ===
Pos	Team	Pld	W	D	L	GF	GA	GD	Pts	Promotion or relegation
1	Wroxham	42	31	6	5	113	41	+72	99	
2	Stowmarket Town	42	26	9	7	86	50	+36	87	
3	Cornard United	42	24	8	10	85	47	+38	80	
4	Norwich United	42	23	7	12	72	53	+19	76	
5	Wisbech Town	42	23	6	13	86	62	+24	75	
6	Harwich & Parkeston	42	24	2	16	106	61	+45	74	
7	Newmarket Town	42	19	14	9	66	50	+16	71	
8	Haverhill Rovers	42	18	11	13	70	61	+9	65	
9	Halstead Town	42	18	6	18	79	72	+7	60	
10	March Town United	42	15	12	15	64	49	+15	57	
11	Lowestoft Town	42	16	9	17	67	64	+3	57	
12	Gorleston	42	16	8	18	62	64	−2	56	
13	Felixstowe Town	42	14	11	17	55	61	−6	53	
14	Great Yarmouth Town	42	15	6	21	60	71	−11	51	
15	Histon	42	15	5	22	61	89	−28	50	
16	Tiptree United	42	11	16	15	54	70	−16	49	
17	Brantham Athletic	42	12	12	18	51	69	−18	48	
18	Watton United	42	12	9	21	57	70	−13	45	
19	Chatteris Town	42	12	7	23	49	72	−23	43	
20	Brightlingsea United	42	11	9	22	60	83	−23	42	
21	Clacton Town	42	11	9	22	50	90	−40	42	Relegated to Division One
22	Thetford Town	42	3	4	35	31	135	−104	13	Relegated to Division One

Source: fchd
Rules for classification: 1) points; 2) goal difference; 3) number of goals scored.

== Division One ==
Eastern Counties Football League Division One
- Season: 1991–92
- Champions: Diss Town
- Promoted: Diss Town; Fakenham Town
- Matches: 380
- Goals: 1,259 (3.31 per match)

Division One featured 17 clubs which competed in the division last season, along with three new clubs:

- Cambridge City reserves
- Hadleigh United, joined from the Suffolk and Ipswich League
- Sudbury Wanderers, joined from the Essex and Suffolk Border League

=== League table ===
Pos	Team	Pld	W	D	L	GF	GA	GD	Pts	Promotion
1	Diss Town	38	28	6	4	105	28	+77	90	Promoted to the Premier Division
2	Fakenham Town	38	25	7	6	80	35	+45	82	Promoted to the Premier Division
3	Woodbridge Town	38	19	10	9	70	34	+36	67	
4	Ely City	38	20	6	12	66	52	+14	66	
5	Downham Town	38	19	5	14	68	61	+7	62	
6	Long Sutton Athletic	38	18	7	13	70	58	+12	61	
7	Sudbury Town reserves	38	17	8	13	72	58	+14	59	
8	Soham Town Rangers	38	16	11	11	70	55	+15	59	
9	Cambridge City reserves	38	17	7	14	84	74	+10	58	
10	Somersham Town	38	16	9	13	75	56	+19	57	
11	Hadleigh United	38	17	6	15	59	61	−2	57	
12	Sudbury Wanderers	38	16	6	16	63	62	+1	54	
13	King's Lynn reserves	38	12	11	15	58	61	−3	47	
14	Warboys Town	38	13	8	17	60	69	−9	47	
15	Ipswich Wanderers	38	10	9	19	47	70	−23	39	
16	Bury Town reserves	38	10	9	19	45	74	−29	39	
17	Clarksteel Yaxley	38	11	6	21	49	79	−30	39	Resigned to the Huntingdonshire League
18	Swaffham Town	38	11	5	22	53	80	−27	38	
19	Huntingdon United	38	7	7	24	34	90	−56	28	Resigned to the Huntingdonshire League
20	Mildenhall Town	38	2	9	27	31	102	−71	15	

Source: fchd
Rules for classification: 1) points; 2) goal difference; 3) number of goals scored.
