= 1985–86 Eastern Counties Football League =

The 1985–86 season was the 44th in the history of Eastern Counties Football League a football competition in England.

The league featured 22 clubs which competed in the league last season, no new clubs joined the league this season. Sudbury Town were champions, winning their fourth Eastern Counties Football League title.

== League table ==
Eastern Counties Football League
- Season: 1985–86
- Champions: Sudbury Town
- Matches: 462
- Goals: 1,534 (3.32 per match)

Pos	Team	Pld	W	D	L	GF	GA	GD	Pts
1	Sudbury Town	42	30	6	6	107	45	+62	66
2	Colchester United reserves	42	29	6	7	109	49	+60	64
3	Great Yarmouth Town	42	29	5	8	95	46	+49	63
4	Bury Town	42	23	10	9	93	54	+39	56
5	Tiptree United	42	24	7	11	78	54	+24	55
6	Braintree Town	42	22	11	9	91	53	+38	55
7	March Town United	42	22	8	12	74	62	+12	52
8	Stowmarket Town	42	19	13	10	79	62	+17	51
9	Wisbech Town	42	22	5	15	79	55	+24	49
10	Histon	42	20	7	15	75	58	+17	47
11	Lowestoft Town	42	16	12	14	75	50	+25	44
12	Felixstowe Town	42	19	6	17	62	54	+8	44
13	Gorleston	42	15	9	18	74	64	+10	39
14	Haverhill Rovers	42	16	6	20	61	59	+2	38
15	Thetford Town	42	10	10	22	48	87	−39	30
16	Brantham Athletic	42	13	4	25	57	108	−51	30
17	Harwich & Parkeston	42	10	9	23	52	72	−20	29
18	Soham Town Rangers	42	11	7	24	55	92	−37	29
19	Chatteris Town	42	10	6	26	37	79	−42	26
20	Ely City	42	8	9	25	46	82	−36	25
21	Newmarket Town	42	9	5	28	59	119	−60	23
22	Clacton Town	42	2	5	35	28	130	−102	9

Source: fchd
Rules for classification: 1) points; 2) goal difference; 3) number of goals scored.
