= Jordan Nicholson =

English footballer (born 1993)

Personal information
- Full name: Jordan Nicholson
- Date of birth: 29 September 1993 (age 33)
- Place of birth: Godmanchester, England
- Position: Attacking midfielder

Team information
- Current team: Spalding United

Youth career
- –2009: Cambridge City

Senior career*
Years	Team	Apps	(Gls)
2009–2013	Cambridge City	1	(0)
2013–2014	Sawston United	25	(23)
2014–2015	Eynesbury Rovers	28	(26)
2015	Histon	22	(14)
2015–2018	Peterborough United	2	(0)
2016–2017	→ Nuneaton Town (loan)	27	(11)
2017–2018	→ Nuneaton Town (loan)	24	(9)
2018	Barnet	8	(0)
2018	→ Brackley Town (loan)	6	(1)
2018–2019	Darlington	41	(11)
2019–2020	Hereford	20	(3)
2020	→ Buxton (loan)	3	(0)
2020	→ Boston United (loan)	0	(0)
2020–2024	Peterborough Sports	64	(24)
2024	St Ives Town	3	(0)
2024–	Spalding United	4	(1)
2026–	Alconbury	0	(0)
- * Club domestic league appearances and goals

Jordan Nicholson (born 29 September 1993) is an English professional footballer who plays as an attacking midfielder for Spalding United. He previously played in the Football League for Peterborough United and Barnet and in non-league football for several clubs.

== Playing career ==
Nicholson began his career as a youth- and reserve-team player for Cambridge City, and made one brief substitute appearance for their Southern League team in April 2013 before leaving the club at the end of the season. He spent 2013–14 scoring freely in Cambridgeshire County League football for Sawston United, before an equally successful, albeit injury-afflicted, 2014–15 season in the United Counties League with Eynesbury Rovers. He joined Histon of the Southern League Premier Division in the summer of 2015, and scored 15 goals in the space of four months.

After a trial, Nicholson signed a two-and-a-half-year contract with League One club Peterborough United on 24 December 2015, at which point he gave up his former job as a carer. He made his Football League debut on 20 February 2016, coming on as a half-time substitute for Harry Toffolo in a 3–0 defeat to Millwall at The Den.

He was loaned to National League North club Nuneaton Town on 4 August 2016 for the season, but was recalled in March 2017 because his parent club wanted to assess him. Nicholson joined Nuneaton on loan again for the 2017–18 season. On 31 January 2018, he was recalled and joined League Two club Barnet permanently. He returned to the National League North in March, on loan to Brackley Town for what remained of the season. Nicholson was released by Barnet at the end of the season.

Nicholson followed his former manager at Nuneaton, Tommy Wright, to another National North club, Darlington, in June 2018. He finished the season as top scorer, with 11 goals from 43 appearances, and was then released by mutual consent.

He signed for Hereford, also of the National League North, in June 2019. In January 2020, Nicholson joined Buxton on loan. On 13 March 2020, he joined Boston United on loan until the end of the season. Following the curtailment of the season due to the coronavirus pandemic, Nicholson did not make his debut until 25 July 2020 in the playoff semi-final win against Gateshead. His second and last appearance was in the final, which Boston lost to Altrincham.

After Nicholson left Hereford, Boston had hoped to make his move permanent, but instead he signed for Southern League Premier Division Central club Peterborough Sports. The 2020–21 season was curtailed with very few matches played, and Nicholson became a first-team regular in 2021–22 before a broken leg put him out for four months. He returned to action with three matches left in the regular season, and was able to start both play-off matches as Peterborough Sports gained promotion to the National League North. On 21 September 2022, 16 minutes after scoring what proved to be the only goal of an FA Cup replay, Nicholson broke the same leg.

== Career statistics ==
As of end of 2023–24 season

Appearances and goals by club, season and competition
Club	Season	League			FA Cup		League Cup (Note: Includes Football League Cup, Southern League Cup, United Counties League Cup, Cambridgeshire County League Premier League Cup)		Other		Total	
Club	Season	Division	Apps	Goals	Apps	Goals	Apps	Goals	Apps	Goals	Apps	Goals
Cambridge City	2009–10	Southern League (SFL) Premier Division	0	0	0	0	0	0	1 (Note: Appearance(s) in Cambridgeshire Invitation Cup)	0	1	0
Cambridge City	2010–11	SFL Premier Division	0	0	0	0	0	0	1	0	1	0
Cambridge City	2011–12	SFL Premier Division	0	0	0	0	1	0	2	0	3	0
Cambridge City	2012–13	SFL Premier Division	1	0	0	0	0	0	0	0	1	0
Cambridge City	Total		1	0	0	0	1	0	4	0	6	0
Sawston United	2013–14	Cambridgeshire County League Premier	25	23	—		1	1	2 (Note: Two appearances in Cliff Bullen Challenge Cup)	0	28	24
Eynesbury Rovers	2014–15	United Counties League Premier Division	28	26	—		0	0	4 (Note: Two appearances in FA Vase, one each in Huntingdonshire Senior Cup and Hinchingbrooke Cup)	0	32	26
Histon	2015–16	SFL Premier Division	22	15	1	0	0	0	3 (Note: Two appearances in FA Trophy, one in Cambridgeshire FA Professional Cup)	0	26	15
Peterborough United	2015–16	League One	2	0	0	0	—		—		2	0
Peterborough United	2016–17	League One	0	0	—		—		—		0	0
Peterborough United	2017–18	League One	—		—		—		—		0	0
Peterborough United	Total		2	0	0	0	—		—		2	0
Nuneaton Town (loan)	2016–17	National League North	27	11	0	0	—		4 (Note: Appearance(s) in FA Trophy)	6	31	17
Nuneaton Town (loan)	2017–18	National League North	24	9	1	0	—		3 (Note: Two appearances and two goals in FA Trophy, one appearance and one goal in Birmingham Senior Cup)	3	28	12
Nuneaton Town (loan)	Total		51	20	1	0	—		7	9	59	29
Barnet	2017–18	League Two	8	0	—		—		—		8	0
Brackley Town (loan)	2017–18	National League North	6	1	—		—		—		6	1
Darlington	2018–19	National League North	41	11	1	0	—		1	0	43	11
Hereford	2019-20	National League North	20	3	3	1	—		2	0	25	4
Buxton (loan)	2019–20	Northern Premier League (NPL); Premier Division	3	0	—		—		—		3	0
Boston United (loan)	2019-20	National League North	0	0	—		—		2 (Note: Appearances in National League North playoffs)	0	2	0
Peterborough Sports	2020–21	SFL Premier Division Central	5	2	3	1	0	0	5	2	13	5
Peterborough Sports	2021–22	SFL Premier Division Central	18	10	3	1	0	0	4 (Note: Two appearances and one goal in FA Trophy, two appearances in Southern League Premier Division Central playoffs)	1	25	12
Peterborough Sports	2022–23	National League North	23	8	2	1	—		1	0	26	9
Peterborough Sports	2023–24	National League North	18	4	3	0	—		1	0	22	4
Peterborough Sports	Total		64	24	11	3	0	0	11	3	86	30
Career total			271	123	17	4	2	1	35	12	323	142
