= 1970–71 Eastern Counties Football League =

The 1970–71 Eastern Counties Football League was the 29th season in the history of the Eastern Counties Football League.

Two new clubs joined the league this season:

- Braintree & Crittall, transferred from the Metropolitan League.
- Wisbech Town, transferred from the Southern Football League.

Lowestoft Town were champions, winning their ninth Eastern Counties Football League title.

== League table ==
Eastern Counties Football League
- Season: 1970–71
- Champions: Lowestoft Town
- Matches played: 420
- Goals scored: 1,550 (3.69 per match)

Pos	Team	Pld	W	D	L	GF	GA	GAv	Pts	Promotion or relegation
1	Lowestoft Town (C)	40	30	6	4	114	37	3.081	66	
2	Wisbech Town	40	26	5	9	96	57	1.684	57	
3	Ely City	40	24	6	10	109	71	1.535	54	
4	Gorleston	40	22	6	12	81	49	1.653	50	
5	Sudbury Town	40	22	5	13	96	62	1.548	49	
6	Norwich City 'A'	40	20	9	11	70	55	1.273	49	
7	March Town United	40	17	11	12	82	67	1.224	45	
8	Thetford Town	40	19	6	15	73	58	1.259	44	
9	Braintree & Crittall	40	15	14	11	58	44	1.318	44	
10	St Neots Town	40	18	8	14	82	77	1.065	44	
11	Chatteris Town	40	18	6	16	70	71	0.986	42	
12	Newmarket Town	40	15	7	18	66	73	0.904	37	
13	Clacton Town	40	15	6	19	77	83	0.928	36	
14	King's Lynn reserves	40	14	8	18	69	91	0.758	36	Resigned from the league
15	Maldon Town	40	13	9	18	61	68	0.897	35	
16	Gothic	40	12	10	18	68	88	0.773	34	
17	Stowmarket	40	11	10	19	63	88	0.716	32	
18	Great Yarmouth Town	40	14	3	23	68	91	0.747	31	
19	Soham Town Rangers	40	8	7	25	55	87	0.632	23	
20	Histon	40	6	9	25	56	104	0.538	21	
21	Haverhill Rovers	40	3	5	32	36	129	0.279	11	

Source: rsssf.org
Rules for classification: 1) Points; 2) Goal average; 3) Goals scored
(C) Champions
