= 1973–74 Eastern Counties Football League =

The 1973–74 Eastern Counties Football League was the 32nd season in the history of the Eastern Counties Football League.

One new club joined the league this season:

- Cambridge City reserves, rejoined the league after leaving in the 1965–66 season.

Sudbury Town won their first Eastern Counties Football League title.

== League table ==
Eastern Counties Football League
- Season: 1973–74
- Champions: Sudbury Town
- Matches played: 342
- Goals scored: 1,084 (3.17 per match)

Pos	Team	Pld	W	D	L	GF	GA	GAv	Pts
1	Sudbury Town (C)	36	22	8	6	81	33	2.455	52
2	Wisbech Town	36	18	13	5	71	37	1.919	49
3	Clacton Town	36	20	9	7	66	35	1.886	49
4	Gorleston	36	19	7	10	69	45	1.533	45
5	Lowestoft Town	36	16	13	7	64	44	1.455	45
6	Thetford Town	36	18	7	11	74	64	1.156	43
7	Norwich City 'A'	36	14	13	9	62	50	1.240	41
8	Braintree & Crittall	36	14	11	11	60	53	1.132	39
9	Newmarket Town	36	13	12	11	50	48	1.042	38
10	Ely City	36	12	10	14	65	61	1.066	34
11	Cambridge City reserves	36	14	6	16	49	68	0.721	34
12	Histon	36	11	10	15	59	66	0.894	32
13	Great Yarmouth Town	36	10	11	15	48	52	0.923	31
14	March Town United	36	6	17	13	37	49	0.755	29
15	Soham Town Rangers	36	11	6	19	47	48	0.979	28
16	Stowmarket	36	8	10	18	50	70	0.714	26
17	Chatteris Town	36	7	11	18	53	77	0.688	25
18	Gothic	36	9	4	23	35	80	0.438	22
19	Haverhill Rovers	36	8	6	22	44	104	0.423	22

Source: rsssf.org
Rules for classification: 1) Points; 2) Goal average; 3) Goals scored
(C) Champions
