= 1994–95 Eastern Counties Football League =

The 1994–95 season was the 53rd in the history of Eastern Counties Football League a football competition in England.

Halstead Town were champions, winning their first Eastern Counties Football League title.

== Premier Division ==
Eastern Counties Football League Premier Division
- Season: 1994–95
- Champions: Halstead Town
- Relegated: Chatteris Town; Histon
- Matches: 462
- Goals: 1,598 (3.46 per match)

The Premier Division featured 20 clubs which competed in the division last season, along with two new clubs, promoted from Division One:

- Hadleigh United
- Woodbridge Town

=== League table ===
Pos	Team	Pld	W	D	L	GF	GA	GD	Pts	Promotion or relegation
1	Halstead Town	42	31	8	3	129	35	+94	101	
2	Wroxham	42	29	7	6	96	44	+52	94	
3	Wisbech Town	42	28	7	7	108	46	+62	91	
4	Diss Town	42	27	6	9	114	49	+65	87	
5	Harwich & Parkeston	42	24	8	10	130	77	+53	80	
6	Fakenham Town	42	22	7	13	80	53	+27	73	
7	Lowestoft Town	42	20	12	10	77	56	+21	72	
8	Newmarket Town	42	20	8	14	69	57	+12	68	
9	Sudbury Wanderers	42	19	10	13	77	63	+14	67	
10	Woodbridge Town	42	17	11	14	66	58	+8	62	
11	Stowmarket Town	42	15	11	16	77	72	+5	56	
12	Tiptree United	42	17	5	20	76	86	−10	56	
13	Felixstowe Town	42	17	4	21	54	70	−16	55	
14	March Town United	42	13	14	15	51	56	−5	53	
15	Hadleigh United	42	12	10	20	64	80	−16	46	
16	Great Yarmouth Town	42	11	8	23	44	69	−25	41	
17	Haverhill Rovers	42	11	7	24	52	82	−30	40	
18	Soham Town Rangers	42	9	11	22	60	99	−39	38	
19	Watton United	42	10	6	26	44	87	−43	36	
20	Cornard United	42	8	10	24	46	99	−53	34	
21	Histon	42	10	3	29	54	127	−73	33	Relegated to Division One
22	Chatteris Town	42	2	7	33	30	133	−103	13	Relegated to Division One

Source: fchd
Rules for classification: 1) points; 2) goal difference; 3) number of goals scored.

== Division One ==
Eastern Counties Football League Division One
- Season: 1994–95
- Champions: Clacton Town
- Promoted: Clacton Town; Sudbury Town reserves
- Matches: 342
- Goals: 1,272 (3.72 per match)

Division One featured 16 clubs which competed in the division last season, along with three new clubs:

- Gorleston, relegated from the Premier Division
- King's Lynn reserves
- Norwich United, relegated from the Premier Division

=== League table ===
Pos	Team	Pld	W	D	L	GF	GA	GD	Pts	Promotion
1	Clacton Town	36	25	5	6	86	39	+47	80	Promoted to the Premier Division
2	Sudbury Town reserves	36	23	6	7	102	49	+53	75	Promoted to the Premier Division
3	Warboys Town	36	23	5	8	82	45	+37	74	
4	Gorleston	36	21	10	5	101	44	+57	73	
5	Downham Town	36	20	9	7	99	43	+56	69	
6	Ely City	36	21	5	10	87	45	+42	68	
7	Brightlingsea United	36	20	5	11	69	46	+23	65	
8	Ipswich Wanderers	36	18	8	10	85	62	+23	62	
9	Somersham Town	36	16	5	15	61	61	0	53	
10	Swaffham Town	36	15	7	14	69	59	+10	52	
11	Mildenhall Town	36	15	5	16	57	60	−3	50	
12	King's Lynn reserves	36	14	6	16	66	67	−1	48	
13	Norwich United	36	8	13	15	48	59	−11	37	
14	Stanway Rovers	36	11	4	21	60	89	−29	37	
15	Thetford Town	36	9	7	20	38	76	−38	34	
16	Long Sutton Athletic	36	9	3	24	47	91	−44	30	Resigned to the Peterborough and District League
17	Cambridge City reserves	36	7	9	20	37	83	−46	30	Resigned from the league
18	Brantham Athletic	36	6	5	25	45	82	−37	23	Resigned to the Suffolk & Ipswich League
19	Bury Town reserves	36	2	1	33	33	172	−139	7	

Source: fchd
Rules for classification: 1) points; 2) goal difference; 3) number of goals scored.
