= 1993–94 Eastern Counties Football League =

The 1993–94 season was the 52nd in the history of Eastern Counties Football League a football competition in England.

Wroxham were champions, winning their third Eastern Counties Football League title in a row.

== Premier Division ==
Eastern Counties Football League Premier Division
- Season: 1993–94
- Champions: Wroxham
- Relegated: Gorleston; Norwich United
- Matches: 462
- Goals: 1,437 (3.11 per match)

The Premier Division featured 20 clubs which competed in the division last season, along with two new clubs, promoted from Division One:

- Soham Town Rangers
- Sudbury Wanderers

=== League table ===
Pos	Team	Pld	W	D	L	GF	GA	GD	Pts	Promotion or relegation
1	Wroxham	42	28	7	7	92	41	+51	91	
2	Halstead Town	42	28	6	8	112	49	+63	90	
3	Newmarket Town	42	26	8	8	82	48	+34	86	
4	Diss Town	42	24	10	8	95	48	+47	82	
5	Stowmarket Town	42	21	6	15	70	59	+11	69	
6	Wisbech Town	42	19	11	12	61	44	+17	68	
7	Sudbury Wanderers	42	19	10	13	75	59	+16	67	
8	Felixstowe Town	42	18	12	12	65	47	+18	66	
9	Lowestoft Town	42	19	7	16	62	62	0	64	
10	Haverhill Rovers	42	18	9	15	71	61	+10	63	
11	Harwich & Parkeston	42	16	13	13	72	63	+9	61	
12	Chatteris Town	42	16	9	17	52	65	−13	57	
13	Cornard United	42	15	10	17	68	72	−4	55	
14	Tiptree United	42	14	9	19	64	72	−8	51	
15	Watton United	42	13	8	21	47	75	−28	47	
16	Great Yarmouth Town	42	12	9	21	50	60	−10	45	
17	Fakenham Town	42	10	13	19	51	81	−30	43	
18	Soham Town Rangers	42	10	10	22	69	103	−34	40	
19	March Town United	42	9	11	22	39	70	−31	38	
20	Histon	42	8	12	22	48	87	−39	36	
21	Gorleston	42	8	9	25	43	77	−34	33	Relegated to Division One
22	Norwich United	42	8	7	27	49	94	−45	31	Relegated to Division One

Source: fchd
Rules for classification: 1) points; 2) goal difference; 3) number of goals scored.

== Division One ==
Eastern Counties Football League Division One
- Season: 1993–94
- Champions: Hadleigh United
- Promoted: Hadleigh United; Woodbridge Town
- Matches: 306
- Goals: 1,099 (3.59 per match)

Division One featured 16 clubs which competed in the division last season, along with two new clubs, relegated from the Premier Division:

- Brantham Athletic
- Brightlingsea United

=== League table ===
Pos	Team	Pld	W	D	L	GF	GA	GD	Pts	Promotion
1	Hadleigh United	34	27	4	3	96	30	+66	85	Promoted to the Premier Division
2	Woodbridge Town	34	25	5	4	100	31	+69	80	Promoted to the Premier Division
3	Warboys Town	34	22	5	7	56	31	+25	71	
4	Sudbury Town reserves	34	22	3	9	102	49	+53	69	
5	Mildenhall Town	34	16	4	14	69	59	+10	52	
6	Downham Town	34	15	7	12	52	43	+9	52	
7	Somersham Town	34	14	8	12	65	57	+8	50	
8	Brightlingsea United	34	15	5	14	54	53	+1	50	
9	Stanway Rovers	34	14	6	14	59	57	+2	48	
10	Ipswich Wanderers	34	14	5	15	66	57	+9	47	
11	Ely City	34	11	12	11	49	51	−2	45	
12	Cambridge City reserves	34	12	4	18	61	68	−7	40	
13	Clacton Town	34	10	9	15	46	63	−17	39	
14	Bury Town reserves	34	10	7	17	58	91	−33	37	
15	Brantham Athletic	34	9	6	19	59	90	−31	33	
16	Long Sutton Athletic	34	6	10	18	46	76	−30	28	
17	Swaffham Town	34	6	5	23	33	91	−58	23	
18	Thetford Town	34	3	5	26	28	102	−74	14	

Source: fchd
Rules for classification: 1) points; 2) goal difference; 3) number of goals scored.
