= 1980–81 Eastern Counties Football League =

The 1980–81 season was the third under this name and the 39th in the history of Eastern Counties Football League a football competition in England.

The league featured 22 clubs which competed in the league last season, no new clubs joined the league this season. Gorleston won the league for the second season in a row, winning their fourth Eastern Counties Football League title.

== League table ==
Town & Country League
- Season: 1980–81
- Champions: Gorleston
- Matches: 462
- Goals: 1,458 (3.16 per match)

Pos	Team	Pld	W	D	L	GF	GA	GD	Pts
1	Gorleston	42	32	7	3	98	33	+65	71
2	Sudbury Town	42	28	8	6	99	37	+62	64
3	Tiptree United	42	23	10	9	81	52	+29	56
4	Ely City	42	21	13	8	100	48	+52	55
5	Great Yarmouth Town	42	22	9	11	95	59	+36	53
6	March Town United	42	20	12	10	63	47	+16	52
7	Saffron Walden Town	42	17	14	11	70	56	+14	48
8	Lowestoft Town	42	15	15	12	69	60	+9	45
9	Bury Town	42	16	11	15	66	62	+4	43
10	Newmarket Town	42	17	8	17	64	76	−12	42
11	Wisbech Town	42	16	9	17	73	74	−1	41
12	Stowmarket	42	14	11	17	63	79	−16	39
13	Colchester United reserves	42	15	8	19	85	72	+13	38
14	Brantham Athletic	42	12	14	16	61	61	0	38
15	Clacton Town	42	13	12	17	50	60	−10	38
16	Felixstowe Town	42	13	8	21	56	81	−25	34
17	Braintree & Crittall Athletic	42	12	10	20	43	74	−31	34
18	Soham Town Rangers	42	8	17	17	38	68	−30	33
19	Thetford Town	42	10	11	21	54	91	−37	31
20	Haverhill Rovers	42	9	12	21	44	55	−11	30
21	Chatteris Town	42	7	7	28	50	117	−67	21
22	Histon	42	3	12	27	36	96	−60	18

Source: fchd
Rules for classification: 1) points; 2) goal difference; 3) number of goals scored.
