= FIFC =

FIFC can refer to one of the following English football clubs:

- Folkestone Invicta F.C.
- Fulbourn Institute F.C.
- Fish Island F.C.
