= Cambridgeshire Invitation Cup =

- Founded: 1950; 76 years ago
- Region: Cambridgeshire
- Current champions: Cambridge City (16th title)
- Most championships: Cambridge City (16 titles)
- Website: Cambridgeshire FA

The Cambridgeshire Invitation Cup is the senior county cup competition of the Cambridgeshire County Football Association. Established in 1950, it is contested by amateur and semi-professional football clubs in and around the English county of Cambridgeshire. The first winners were Cambridge City and the current holders are Cambridge City.

== List of finals ==
Season	Winners	Result	Runner-up	Notes
1950–51	Cambridge City	3–0	Histon	
1951–52	Cambridge United	2–1	Cambridge City	
1952–53	Wisbech Town	2–1	Histon	Replay. First match ended 1–1.
1953–54	Cambridge United	3–1	Histon	Replay. First match ended 1–1.
1954–55	March Town United	3–2	Cambridge United	
1955–56	Wisbech Town	2–0	Pegasus	
1956–57	Cambridge United	1–0	Cambridge City	
1957–58	Wisbech Town	3–1	Cambridge United	Replay. First match ended 2–2.
1958–59	Newmarket Town	2–0	Haverhill Rovers	Replay. First match ended 1–1.
1959–60	Pegasus	2–1	Ely City	
1960–61	Pegasus	6–1	Ely City	
1961–62	Eynesbury Rovers	3–1	Ely City	
1962–63	Haverhill Rovers	4–0	Soham Town Rangers	
1963–64	Chatteris Town	3–0	Ely City	
1964–65	Haverhill Rovers	2–1	Chatteris Town	
1965–66	Chatteris Town	3–1	Histon	
1966–67	Haverhill Rovers	3–1	Parson Drove	Replay. First match ended 1–1.
1967–68	Chatteris Town	4–1	Soham Town Rangers	1st Leg: 0–0, 2nd Leg: 4–1, Agg: 4–1
1968–69	Chatteris Town	5–0	Swavesey	Replay. 1st Leg: 1–2, 2nd Leg: 2–1, Agg: 3–3.
1969–70	Parson Drove	4–3	Ely City	1st Leg: 1–1, 2nd Leg: 3–2, Agg: 4–3.
1970–71	Ely City	7–3	Parson Drove	1st Leg: 2–0, 2nd Leg: 5–3, Agg: 7–3.
1971–72	Chatteris Town	7–2	Ely City	1st Leg: 4–1, 2nd Leg: 3–1, Agg: 7–2.
1972–73	Parson Drove	5–3	Wisbech Town	1st Leg: 2–0, 2nd Leg: 3–3, Agg: 5–3.
1973–74	Chatteris Town	5–2	Soham Town Rangers	1st Leg: 4–1, 2nd Leg: 1–1, Agg: 5–2.
1974–75	Wisbech Town	8–4	Willingham	1st Leg: 3–4, 2nd Leg: 5–0, Agg: 8–4.
1975–76	Wisbech Town	7–3	Great Shelford	1st Leg: 2–2, 2nd Leg: 5–1, Agg: 7–3.
1976–77	Cambridge City	4–1	March Town United	1st Leg: 1–0, 2nd Leg: 3–1, Agg: 4–1.
1977–78	Histon	1–1	Cambridge City	1st Leg: 1–0, 2nd Leg: 0–1, Agg: 1–1. Histon won on penalties.
1978–79	Cambridge City	4–3	Soham Town Rangers	1st Leg: 2–2, 2nd Leg: 2–1, Agg: 4–3.
1979–80	Histon	4–3	March Town United	1st Leg: 2–2, 2nd Leg: 2–1, Agg: 4–3.
1980–81	Great Shelford	1–0	Chatteris Town	
1981–82	Wisbech Town	2–0	March Town United	
1982–83	Wisbech Town	5–0	Sawston United	
1983–84	Cambridge City	2–1	Histon	
1984–85	Histon	1–0	Chatteris Town	
1985–86	Cambridge City	4–1	Soham Town Rangers	
1986–87	Great Shelford	2–1	Wisbech Town	
1987–88	Great Shelford	1–0	March Town United	
1988–89	Cambridge City	1–0	Histon	
1989–90	Cambridge City	2–1	Histon	
1990–91	Soham Town Rangers	4–1	March Town United	
1991–92	Wisbech Town	2–0	Cambridge City	
1992–93	Cambridge City	3–1	Wisbech Town	
1993–94	Chatteris Town	3–1	Wisbech Town	
1994–95	Wisbech Town	4–2	Cambridge City	
1995–96	Mildenhall Town	3–0	Foxton	
1996–97	Histon	2–2	Newmarket Town	Histon won 5–4 on penalties.
1997–98	Soham Town Rangers	3–0	Wisbech Town	
1998–99	Soham Town Rangers	3–2	Newmarket Town	
1999–00	Cambridge City	3–0	Mildenhall Town	
2000–01	Histon	2–0	Wisbech Town	
2001–02	Ely City	1–0	Histon	
2002–03	Cambridge City	2–2	Histon	Cambridge City won 8–7 on penalties.
2003–04	Histon	1–1	Newmarket Town	Histon won 7–6 on penalties.
2004–05	Histon	2–0	Cambridge City	
2005–06	Soham Town Rangers	1–0	Great Shelford	
2006–07	Cambridge City	1–0	Soham Town Rangers	
2007–08	Cambridge City	3–1	Histon reserves	
2008–09	Cambridge City	1–0	Cambridge Regional College	
2009–10	Mildenhall Town	3–1	Wisbech Town	
2010–11	Mildenhall Town	2–0	Haverhill Rovers	
2011–12	Ely City	3–2	Soham Town Rangers	
2012–13	Ely City	3–0	Cambridge City	
2013–14	Soham Town Rangers	6–1	Cambridge Regional College	
2014–15	Cambridge City	2–1	Soham Town Rangers	
2015–16	Wisbech Town	3–1	Cambridge City	
2016–17	Cambridge City	4–1	Ely City	
2017–18	Ely City	2–1	Cambridge United Development	
2018–19	Ely City	2–1	Histon	
2019–20	Competition abandoned due to COVID-19 pandemic.			
2020–21	No competition held due to COVID-19 pandemic.			
2021–22	Cambridge United Development	2–1	Ely City	
2022–23	Cambridge United Development	2–2	Cambridge City	Cambridge United Development won 6–5 on penalties.
2023–24	Cambridge City	4–0	Wisbech Town	
2024–25	March Town United	2–0	Ely City	At Cambridge City FC’s stadium. Attendance 505
2025–26	Cambridge City	1-0	Soham Town Rangers	At Cambridge City FC’s stadium. Attendance 775

=== Winners ===
Club	Wins	First final won	Last final won	Runner-up	Last final lost	Total final apps.	Notes
Cambridge City	17	1950–51	2025–26	9	2022–23	26	
Wisbech Town	10	1952–53	2015–16	8	2023–24	18	
Chatteris Town	7	1963–64	1993–94	3	1984–85	10	
Histon	7	1977–78	2004–05	7	2018–19	14	
Ely City	6	1970–71	2018–19	7	2021–22	13	
Cambridge United	5	1951–52	2022–23	2	2017–18	7	(Note: Won two titles as Cambridge United Development.)
Soham Town Rangers	5	1990–91	2013–14	8	2025-26	13	
Haverhill Rovers	3	1962–63	1966–67	1	2010–11	4	
Great Shelford	3	1980–81	1987–88	2	2005–06	5	
Mildenhall Town	3	1995–96	2010–11	1	1999–00	4	
Pegasus	2	1959–60	1960–61	1	1955–56	3	Dissolved in 1963.
Parson Drove	2	1969–70	1972–73	2	1970–71	4	
March Town United	2	1954–55	2024–25	5	1990–91	7	
Newmarket Town	1	1958–59	1958–59	3	2003–04	4	
Eynesbury Rovers	1	1961–62	1961–62	0	–	1	
