= Jim Sharkey =

Scottish footballer

Personal information
- Date of birth: 12 February 1934
- Place of birth: Glasgow, Scotland
- Date of death: 19 October 2014 (aged 80)
- Position: Forward

Senior career*
Years	Team	Apps	(Gls)
- Haverhill Rovers
- Rutherglen Glencairn
1954–1957	Celtic	23	(8)
1957–1961	Airdrie	97	(30)
1961–1962	Raith Rovers	3	(0)
- Cambridge United
- Wisbech Town
- Corby Town
- Bury Town
- Newmarket Town
- Sawston United
- Girton
Total		123	(38)
- * Club domestic league appearances and goals

Jim Sharkey (12 February 1934 – 19 October 2014) was a Scottish professional footballer who played as a forward.

== Career ==
Born in Glasgow, Sharkey played for Haverhill Rovers while on National Service. After playing for Rutherglen Glencairn, he signed for Celtic in 1954, making his senior debut for them in October 1955. He later played for Airdrie and Raith Rovers, making a total of 123 appearances in the Scottish Football League for all three clubs. He later played non-league football in England for Cambridge United, Wisbech Town, Corby Town, Bury Town, Newmarket Town, Sawston United and Girton.

== Later life and death ==
After retiring as a player, Sharkey worked as a porter at Pembroke College, Cambridge. He died on 19 October 2014, at the age of 80.
