= 1995–96 FA Cup =

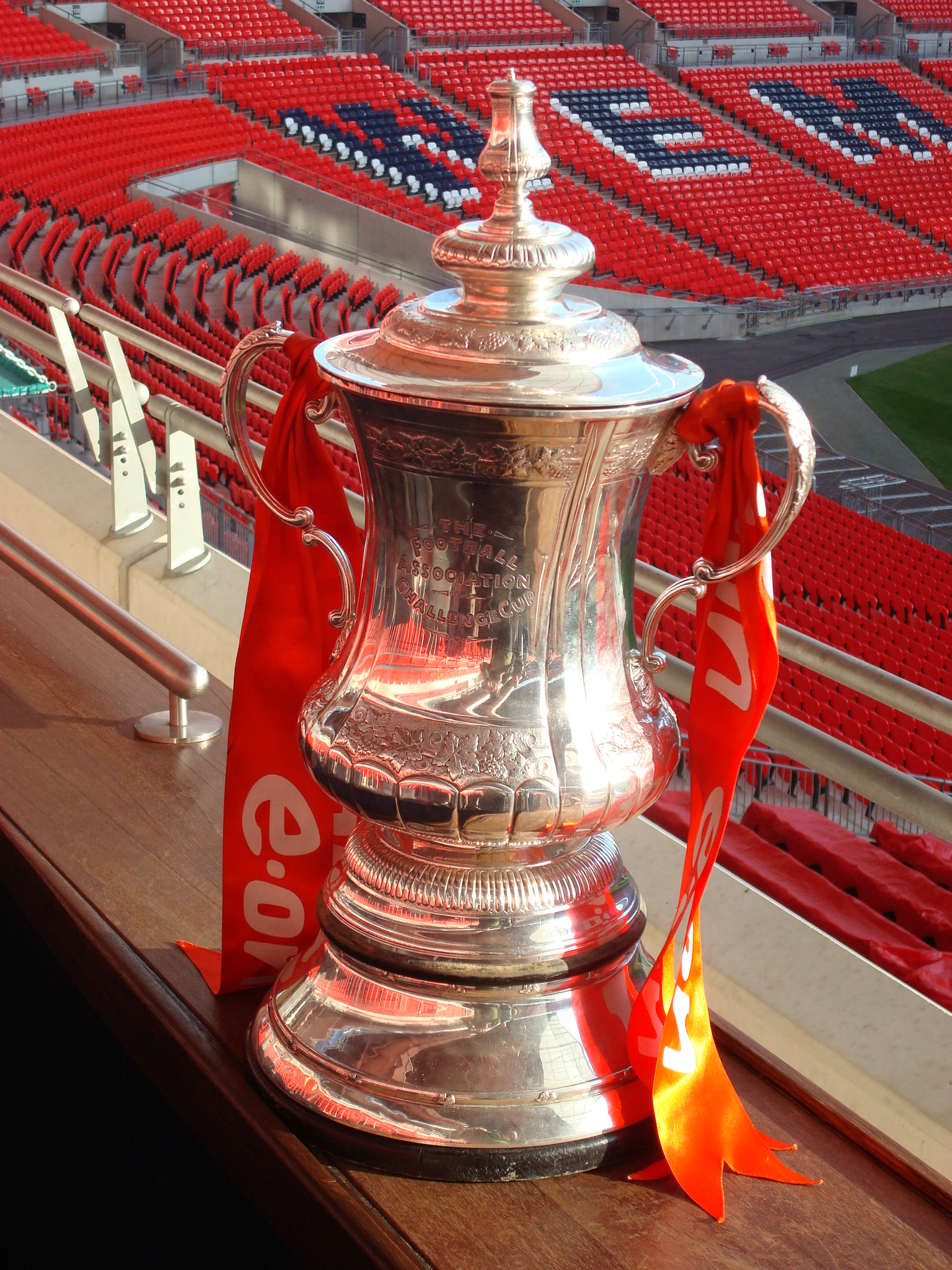
- The FA Cup Trophy

Tournament details
- Country: England; Wales

Final positions
- Champions: Manchester United (9th title)
- Runners-up: Liverpool

Tournament statistics
- Top goal scorer(s): Dave Powell (9 goals)

The 1995–96 FA Cup (known as the FA Cup sponsored by Littlewoods for sponsorship reasons) was the 115th staging of the FA Cup. The competition was won by Manchester United, who won the final through a goal from Eric Cantona five minutes from the end of the game. It gave Manchester United a league and cup double after they secured their third league title in four years. It was also United's third straight FA Cup Final.

The tournament began with teams from non-league football competing in preliminary and qualifying rounds in order to make it to the competition proper. Teams from divisions 1 to 3 entered at the first round, while premiership teams entered in the third round.

The topscorer in the competition was Dave Powell of Gravesend and Northfleet, who scored 9 goals.

== Calendar ==
Round	Initial Matches	New Entries	Clubs
Preliminary round	Saturday 26 August 1995	342	575 → 404
First round qualifying	Saturday 9 September 1995	117	404 → 260
Second round qualifying	Saturday 23 September 1995	none	260 → 188
Third round qualifying	Saturday 7 October 1995	none	188 → 152
Fourth round qualifying	Saturday 21 October 1995	20	152 → 124
First round proper	Saturday 11 November 1995	52	124 → 84
Second round proper	Saturday 2 December 1995	none	84 → 64
Third round proper	Saturday 6 January 1996	44	64 → 32
Fourth round proper	Saturday 27 January 1996	none	32 → 16
Fifth round proper	Saturday 17 February 1996	none	16 → 8
Sixth round proper	Saturday 9 March 1996	none	8 → 4
Semi-finals	Sunday 31 March 1996	none	4 → 2
Final	Saturday 11 May 1996	none	2 → 1

== Qualifying rounds ==
Most participating clubs that were not members of the Premier League or Football League competed in the qualifying rounds to secure one of 28 places available in the first round.

The winners from the fourth qualifying round were Blyth Spartans, Spennymoor United, Marine, Telford United, Barrow, Northwich Victoria, Colwyn Bay, Witton Albion, Runcorn, Nuneaton Borough, Rushden & Diamonds, Canvey Island, Stevenage Borough, Wisbech Town, Hayes, Burton Albion, Hitchin Town, Bromsgrove Rovers, Slough Town, Kingstonian, Farnborough Town, Bognor Regis Town, Sutton United, Newport (IOW), Gravesend & Northfleet, Dorchester Town, Ashford Town (Kent) and Cinderford Town.

Rushden & Diamonds, Canvey Island, Stevenage Borough and Cinderford Town were appearing in the competition proper for the first time, although the emergence of Rushden & Diamonds sparked an interest in predecessor outfit Irthlingborough Town's unexpected Cup qualification back in 1906-07. Of the others, Colwyn Bay and Burton Albion had not featured at this stage since 1987–88 and Wisbech Town had not done so since 1965-66.

Gravesend & Northfleet completed a seven-round run through this season's tournament, defeating Godalming & Guildford, Molesey, Carshalton Athletic and Marlow to earn their place in the main draw. They then saw off Colchester United and Cinderford Town before going out to Premier League side Aston Villa at Villa Park.

== First round proper ==
The 48 teams from the Football League Second and Third Divisions entered in this round along with the 28 non-league clubs from the qualifying rounds and Woking, Kidderminster Harriers, Altrincham and Enfield who were given byes. The round included two clubs from Step 8 of the English football pyramid: Canvey Island from the Isthmian League Second Division and Wisbech Town from the Eastern Counties League Premier Division.

The matches were played on 11 November 1995. There were ten replays, with two ties requiring a penalty shootout to settle them. Fulham's 7–0 victory over Swansea City was an FA Cup record margin of victory against a team from a higher division.

Tie no	Home team	Score	Away team	Date
1	Blackpool	2–1	Chester City	11 November 1995
2	AFC Bournemouth	0–0	Bristol City	11 November 1995
Replay	Bristol City	0–1	AFC Bournemouth	21 November 1995
3	Barnet	2–2	Woking (5)	11 November 1995
Replay	Woking	2–1	Barnet	21 November 1995
4	Barrow (6)	2–1	Nuneaton Borough (7)	11 November 1995
5	Burnley	1–3	Walsall	10 November 1995
6	Bury	0–2	Blyth Spartans (6)	11 November 1995
7	Canvey Island (8)	2–2	Brighton & Hove Albion	12 November 1995
Replay	Brighton & Hove Albion	4–1	Canvey Island	21 November 1995
8	Rochdale	5–3	Rotherham United	11 November 1995
9	Northwich Victoria (5)	1–3	Scunthorpe United	11 November 1995
10	Swindon Town	4–1	Cambridge United	11 November 1995
11	Scarborough	0–2	Chesterfield	11 November 1995
12	Shrewsbury Town	11–2	Marine (6)	11 November 1995
13	Stockport County	5–0	Lincoln City	11 November 1995
14	Wycombe Wanderers	1–1	Gillingham	13 November 1995
Replay	Gillingham	1–0	Wycombe Wanderers	21 November 1995
15	Kidderminster Harriers (5)	2–2	Sutton United (6)	11 November 1995
Replay	Sutton United	1–1	Kidderminster Harriers	21 November 1995
Sutton United won 3–1 on penalties
16	Fulham	7–0	Swansea City	11 November 1995
17	Brentford	1–1	Farnborough Town (5)	11 November 1995
Replay	Farnborough Town	0–4	Brentford	22 November 1995
18	Northampton Town	1–0	Hayes (6)	11 November 1995
19	Bradford City	4–3	Burton Albion (6)	11 November 1995
20	Hull City	0–0	Wrexham	11 November 1995
Replay	Wrexham	0–0	Hull City	21 November 1995
Wrexham won 3–1 on penalties
21	Carlisle United	1–2	Preston North End	11 November 1995
22	Spennymoor United (6)	0–1	Colwyn Bay (6)	11 November 1995
23	Hitchin Town (6)	2–1	Bristol Rovers	11 November 1995
24	Altrincham (5)	0–2	Crewe Alexandra	22 November 1995
25	Exeter City	0–1	Peterborough United	11 November 1995
26	Bognor Regis Town (7)	1–1	Ashford Town (Kent) (7)	11 November 1995
Replay	Ashford Town (Kent)	0–1	Bognor Regis Town	21 November 1995
27	Mansfield Town	4–2	Doncaster Rovers	11 November 1995
28	Kingstonian (6)	5–1	Wisbech Town (8)	11 November 1995
29	Runcorn (5)	1–1	Wigan Athletic	11 November 1995
Replay	Wigan Athletic	4–2	Runcorn	21 November 1995
30	Torquay United	1–0	Leyton Orient	11 November 1995
31	York City	0–1	Notts County	12 November 1995
32	Hereford United	2–1	Stevenage Borough (5)	11 November 1995
33	Newport (IOW) (7)	1–1	Enfield (6)	11 November 1995
Replay	Enfield	2–1	Newport (IOW)	21 November 1995
34	Gravesend & Northfleet (6)	2–0	Colchester United	11 November 1995
35	Slough Town (5)	0–2	Plymouth Argyle	11 November 1995
36	Cinderford Town (7)	2–1	Bromsgrove Rovers (5)	11 November 1995
37	Oxford United	9–1	Dorchester Town (6)	11 November 1995
38	Telford United (5)	2–1	Witton Albion (6)	11 November 1995
39	Hartlepool United	2–4	Darlington	11 November 1995
40	Rushden & Diamonds (6)	1–3	Cardiff City	11 November 1995

== Second round proper ==
The second round of the competition featured the winners of the first round ties. The matches were played on 2 December 1995, with six replays and one penalty shootout required. The round featured two teams from Step 7 of English football: Bognor Regis Town from the Isthmian League First Division and Cinderford Town from the Southern League Southern Division.

Tie no	Home team	Score	Away team	Date
1	Enfield (6)	1–1	Woking (5)	2 December 1995
Replay	Woking	2–1	Enfield	12 December 1995
2	Blackpool	2–0	Colwyn Bay (6)	2 December 1995
3	AFC Bournemouth	0–1	Brentford	2 December 1995
4	Barrow (6)	0–4	Wigan Athletic	2 December 1995
5	Rochdale	2–2	Darlington	2 December 1995
Replay	Darlington	0–1	Rochdale	12 December 1995
6	Gillingham	3–0	Hitchin Town (6)	2 December 1995
7	Crewe Alexandra	2–0	Mansfield Town	2 December 1995
8	Swindon Town	2–0	Cardiff City	2 December 1995
9	Wrexham	3–2	Chesterfield	2 December 1995
10	Stockport County	2–0	Blyth Spartans (6)	2 December 1995
11	Fulham	0–0	Brighton & Hove Albion	2 December 1995
Replay	Brighton & Hove Albion	0–0	Fulham	14 December 1995
Fulham won 4–1 on penalties
12	Bradford City	2–1	Preston North End	2 December 1995
13	Scunthorpe United	1–1	Shrewsbury Town	2 December 1995
Replay	Shrewsbury Town	2–1	Scunthorpe United	12 December 1995
14	Kingstonian (6)	1–2	Plymouth Argyle	3 December 1995
15	Torquay United	1–1	Walsall	2 December 1995
Replay	Walsall	8–4	Torquay United	12 December 1995
16	Hereford United	2–0	Sutton United (6)	2 December 1995
17	Peterborough United	4–0	Bognor Regis Town (7)	2 December 1995
18	Cinderford Town (7)	1–1	Gravesend & Northfleet (6)	2 December 1995
Replay	Gravesend & Northfleet	3–0	Cinderford Town	14 December 1995
19	Oxford United	2–0	Northampton Town	2 December 1995
20	Telford United (5)	0–2	Notts County	2 December 1995

== Third round proper ==
Teams from the Premier League and the Football League First Division entered the competition in this round. The initial matches were played on the weekend of 6-7 January 1996, with fourteen ties going to replays and one of those requiring penalties to settle the result. Gravesend & Northfleet, from the Southern League Premier Division at Step 6 of English football, was the lowest-ranked team in the draw.

Tie no	Home team	Score	Away team	Date
1	Liverpool (1)	7–0	Rochdale (4)	6 January 1996
2	Southampton (1)	3–0	Portsmouth (2)	7 January 1996
3	Watford (2)	1–1	Wimbledon (1)	6 January 1996
Replay	Wimbledon	1–0	Watford	17 January 1996
4	Reading (2)	3–1	Gillingham (4)	6 January 1996
5	Walsall (3)	1–0	Wigan Athletic (4)	6 January 1996
6	Leicester City (2)	0–0	Manchester City (1)	6 January 1996
Replay	Manchester City	5–0	Leicester City	17 January 1996
7	Notts County (3)	1–2	Middlesbrough (1)	6 January 1996
8	Aston Villa (1)	3–0	Gravesend & Northfleet (6)	6 January 1996
9	Grimsby Town (2)	7–1	Luton Town (2)	6 January 1996
10	Crewe Alexandra (3)	4–3	West Bromwich Albion (2)	6 January 1996
11	Derby County (2)	2–4	Leeds United (1)	7 January 1996
12	Everton (1)	2–2	Stockport County (3)	7 January 1996
Replay	Stockport County	2–3	Everton	17 January 1996
13	Swindon Town (3)	2–0	Woking (5)	6 January 1996
14	Ipswich Town (2)	0–0	Blackburn Rovers (1)	6 January 1996
Replay	Blackburn Rovers	0–1	Ipswich Town	16 January 1996
15	Tranmere Rovers (2)	0–2	Queens Park Rangers (1)	6 January 1996
16	Fulham (4)	1–1	Shrewsbury Town (3)	6 January 1996
Replay	Shrewsbury Town	2–1	Fulham	16 January 1996
17	Barnsley (2)	0–0	Oldham Athletic (2)	6 January 1996
Replay	Oldham Athletic	2–1	Barnsley	23 January 1996
18	West Ham United (1)	2–0	Southend United (2)	7 January 1996
19	Manchester United (1)	2–2	Sunderland (2)	6 January 1996
Replay	Sunderland	1–2	Manchester United	16 January 1996
20	Norwich City (2)	1–2	Brentford (3)	6 January 1996
21	Plymouth Argyle (4)	1–3	Coventry City (1)	6 January 1996
22	Bradford City (3)	0–3	Bolton Wanderers (1)	6 January 1996
23	Millwall (2)	3–3	Oxford United (3)	6 January 1996
Replay	Oxford United	1–0	Millwall	16 January 1996
24	Crystal Palace (2)	0–0	Port Vale (2)	6 January 1996
Replay	Port Vale	4–3	Crystal Palace	16 January 1996
25	Chelsea (1)	1–1	Newcastle United (1)	7 January 1996
Replay	Newcastle United	2–2	Chelsea	17 January 1996
Chelsea won 4–2 on penalties
26	Huddersfield Town (2)	2–1	Blackpool (3)	6 January 1996
27	Charlton Athletic (2)	2–0	Sheffield Wednesday (1)	6 January 1996
28	Arsenal (1)	1–1	Sheffield United (2)	6 January 1996
Replay	Sheffield United	1–0	Arsenal	17 January 1996
29	Hereford United (4)	1–1	Tottenham Hotspur (1)	6 January 1996
Replay	Tottenham Hotspur	5–1	Hereford United	17 January 1996
30	Stoke City (2)	1–1	Nottingham Forest (1)	6 January 1996
Replay	Nottingham Forest	2–0	Stoke City	17 January 1996
31	Peterborough United (3)	1–0	Wrexham (3)	6 January 1996
32	Birmingham City (2)	1–1	Wolverhampton Wanderers (2)	6 January 1996
Replay	Wolverhampton Wanderers	2–1	Birmingham City	17 January 1996

== Fourth round proper ==
The fourth round ties were played with the thirty-two winners of the previous round. The matches were originally scheduled for Saturday, 27 January, although only four matches were played that weekend, and only two of these matches resulted in a victory for one side. There were seven replays but no penalty shootouts. The round included seven clubs from the Second Division (Step 3): Walsall, Crewe Alexandra, Swindon Town, Shrewsbury Town, Brentford, Oxford United and Peterborough United.

Tie no	Home team	Score	Away team	Date
1	Southampton	1–1	Crewe Alexandra	7 February 1996
Replay	Crewe Alexandra	2–3	Southampton	13 February 1996
2	Reading	0–3	Manchester United	27 January 1996
3	Nottingham Forest	1–1	Oxford United	7 February 1996
Replay	Oxford United	0–3	Nottingham Forest	13 February 1996
4	Bolton Wanderers	0–1	Leeds United	14 February 1996
5	Middlesbrough	0–0	Wimbledon	7 February 1996
Replay	Wimbledon	1–0	Middlesbrough	13 February 1996
6	Everton	2–2	Port Vale	27 January 1996
Replay	Port Vale	2–1	Everton	14 February 1996
7	Swindon Town	1–0	Oldham Athletic	12 February 1996
8	Shrewsbury Town	0–4	Liverpool	18 February 1996
9	Sheffield United	0–1	Aston Villa	28 January 1996
10	Ipswich Town	1–0	Walsall	13 February 1996
11	Tottenham Hotspur	1–1	Wolverhampton Wanderers	27 January 1996
Replay	Wolverhampton Wanderers	0–2	Tottenham Hotspur	7 February 1996
12	Queens Park Rangers	1–2	Chelsea	29 January 1996
13	Coventry City	2–2	Manchester City	7 February 1996
Replay	Manchester City	2–1	Coventry City	14 February 1996
14	West Ham United	1–1	Grimsby Town	7 February 1996
Replay	Grimsby Town	3–0	West Ham United	14 February 1996
15	Huddersfield Town	2–0	Peterborough United	6 February 1996
16	Charlton Athletic	3–2	Brentford	7 February 1996

== Fifth round proper ==
The fifth-round matches were scheduled for 17 February. There were five replays and one penalty shootout. Swindon Town was again the lowest-ranked team in the round. The 5th round was blighted with postponements resulting from bad weather with only 5 ties played on the intended weekend of 17-19 February 4 were completed in 90 minutes on 17-18 February with 1 abandoned on 19 February Nottingham Forest v Tottenham Hotspur which was abandoned with the score 0-0 after 15 minutes and declared null and void due to a surprise heavy blizzard in the Nottingham area. the remaining ties were played on the 21st February with Replays on 27-28 February while the abandoned original Nottingham Forest v Tottenham Hotspur tie was finally played and completed on 28 February with a 2-2 draw and Replayed on 9 March with a 1-1 draw after extra time with Nottingham Forest winning 3-1 in a penalty shoot out.

Tie no	Home team	Score	Away team	Attendance
1	Liverpool	2–1	Charlton Athletic	28 February 1996
2	Nottingham Forest	2–2	Tottenham Hotspur	28 February 1996
Replay	Tottenham Hotspur	1–1	Nottingham Forest	9 March 1996
Nottingham Forest won 3–1 on penalties
3	Grimsby Town	0–0	Chelsea	21 February 1996
Replay	Chelsea	4–1	Grimsby Town	28 February 1996
4	Swindon Town	1–1	Southampton	17 February 1996
Replay	Southampton	2–0	Swindon Town	28 February 1996
5	Ipswich Town	1–3	Aston Villa	17 February 1996
6	Manchester United	2–1	Manchester City	18 February 1996
7	Huddersfield Town	2–2	Wimbledon	17 February 1996
Replay	Wimbledon	3–1	Huddersfield Town	28 February 1996
8	Leeds United	0–0	Port Vale	21 February 1996
Replay	Port Vale	1–2	Leeds United	27 February 1996

== Sixth round ==
The four quarter-final ties were scheduled to be played on the weekend of 9 and 10 March 1996. There were two replays, between Liverpool and Leeds and Wimbledon & Chelsea. These were played on 20 March 1996.

This was a rare occurrence of all eight quarter-finalists being from the top division.

9 March 1996
15:00 GMT

Chelsea	2–2	Wimbledon
M. Hughes 70'; Gullit 80'		Earle 54'; Holdsworth 81'

Stamford Bridge, London
Attendance: 30,805
10 March 1996
16:00 GMT

Leeds United	0–0	Liverpool

Elland Road, Leeds
Attendance: 24,632
11 March 1996
20:00 GMT

Manchester United	2–0	Southampton
Cantona 49'; Sharpe 90'

Old Trafford, Manchester
Attendance: 45,446
13 March 1996
19:45 GMT

Nottingham Forest	0–1	Aston Villa
		Carr 26'

City Ground, Nottingham
Attendance: 21,067

=== Replays ===
20 March 1996
19:45 GMT

Wimbledon	1–3	Chelsea
Goodman 39'		Petrescu 20'; Duberry 79'; M. Hughes 84'

Selhurst Park, London
Attendance: 21,380
20 March 1996
19:45 GMT

Liverpool	3–0	Leeds United
McManaman 57', 73'; Fowler 83'

Anfield, Liverpool
Attendance: 30,812

== Semi-finals ==
The semi final ties were played at neutral venues on 31 March 1996. Manchester United and Liverpool beat Chelsea and Aston Villa respectively to reach the final. At this stage, Manchester United were top of the league and looking good bets for a unique second double two years after their first one, while Liverpool were hopeful of a similar triumph as they were third in the league and still in with a slim chance of a second double 10 years after their first one.

Just weeks before accepting the role as England manager, Glenn Hoddle watched his Chelsea side throw away their chances of major trophy late in the season for the third year running, one year after losing in the UEFA Cup Winners' Cup semi-finals and two years after losing the FA Cup final.

Aston Villa's defeat ended their hopes of emulating Arsenal's 1993 triumph of an FA Cup/League Cup double, as they had lifted the League Cup the previous weekend.

31 March 1996
13:30 BST

Manchester United	2–1	Chelsea
Cole 55'; Beckham 59'	Report	Gullit 35'

Villa Park, Birmingham
Attendance: 38,421
Referee: Stephen Lodge (Barnsley)

31 March 1996
16:00 BST

Liverpool	3–0	Aston Villa
Fowler 16', 86'; McAteer 90'	Report

Old Trafford, Manchester
Attendance: 39,072
Referee: Paul Durkin (Portland, Dorset)

== Final ==
A late goal from Eric Cantona, United's top scorer and the FWA Player of the Year just a year after being vilified for the assault on a spectator which saw him banned from football for eight months, saw a United side featuring some of the Premier League's youngest players clinch a 1–0 win over Liverpool to become the first team to win the double twice, two years after their first double.

11 May 1996
15:00 BST

Liverpool	0–1	Manchester United
	Report	Cantona 85'

Wembley Stadium, London
Attendance: 79,007
Referee: Dermot Gallagher (Oxfordshire)

== Media coverage ==
For the eighth consecutive season in the United Kingdom, the BBC were the free to air broadcasters while Sky Sports were the subscription broadcasters.

The matches shown live on the BBC were:

• Chelsea 1-1 Newcastle United (R3)

• Sheffield United 0-1 Aston Villa (R4)

• Manchester United 2-1 Manchester City (R5)

• Leeds United 0-0 Liverpool (QF)

• Manchester United 2-1 Chelsea (SF)

• Manchester United 1-0 Liverpool (Final)

The matches shown live on Sky Sports were:

• York City 0-1 Notts County (R1)

• Wycombe Wanderers 1-1 Gillingham (R1)

• Farnborough Town 0-4 Brentford (R1 Replay)

• Bradford City 1-2 Preston North End (R2)

• Kingstonian 1-2 Plymouth Argyle (R2)

• Brighton & Hove Albion 0-0 Fulham (R2 Replay)

• Derby County 2-4 Leeds United (R3)

• Sunderland 1-2 Manchester United (R3 Replay)

• Queens Park Rangers 1-2 Chelsea (R4)

• Wolverhampton Wanderers 0-2 Tottenham Hotspur (R4 Replay)

• Nottingham Forest 2-2 Tottenham Hotspur (R5)

• Port Vale 1-2 Leeds United (R5 Replay)

• Manchester United 2-0 Southampton (QF)

• Liverpool 3-0 Leeds United (QF Replay)

• Liverpool 3-0 Aston Villa (SF)
