= 1995–96 Eastern Counties Football League =

The 1995–96 season was the 54th in the history of Eastern Counties Football League a football competition in England.

Halstead Town were champions, winning their second Eastern Counties Football League title in a row.

== Premier Division ==
Eastern Counties Football League Premier Division
- Season: 1995–96
- Champions: Halstead Town
- Relegated: Cornard United; Haverhill Rovers
- Matches: 462
- Goals: 1,426 (3.09 per match)

The Premier Division featured 20 clubs which competed in the division last season, along with two new clubs, promoted from Division One:

- Clacton Town
- Sudbury Town reserves

=== League table ===
Pos	Team	Pld	W	D	L	GF	GA	GD	Pts	Promotion or relegation
1	Halstead Town	42	31	8	3	110	50	+60	101	
2	Diss Town	42	29	9	4	94	32	+62	96	
3	Wroxham	42	26	10	6	97	39	+58	88	
4	Stowmarket Town	42	23	7	12	69	47	+22	76	
5	Woodbridge Town	42	22	5	15	73	50	+23	71	
6	Newmarket Town	42	18	13	11	78	58	+20	67	
7	Harwich & Parkeston	42	25	8	9	102	55	+47	64 (Note: Harwich & Parkeston were deducted 19 points.)	
8	Felixstowe Town	42	16	11	15	60	57	+3	59	
9	Sudbury Wanderers	42	17	8	17	53	58	−5	59	
10	Tiptree United	42	17	8	17	56	67	−11	59	
11	Wisbech Town	42	16	9	17	76	67	+9	57	
12	Soham Town Rangers	42	16	9	17	76	78	−2	57	
13	Fakenham Town	42	17	5	20	67	67	0	56	
14	Lowestoft Town	42	13	14	15	73	59	+14	53	
15	Clacton Town	42	14	10	18	72	84	−12	52	
16	Great Yarmouth Town	42	11	11	20	34	61	−27	44	
17	Hadleigh United	42	10	9	23	33	85	−52	39	
18	Sudbury Town reserves	42	9	11	22	49	86	−37	38	
19	March Town United	42	10	7	25	39	67	−28	37	
20	Watton United	42	8	13	21	41	73	−32	37	
21	Haverhill Rovers	42	8	10	24	36	78	−42	34	Relegated to Division One
22	Cornard United	42	5	7	30	38	108	−70	22	Relegated to Division One

Source: fchd
Rules for classification: 1) points; 2) goal difference; 3) number of goals scored.

== Division One ==
Eastern Counties Football League Division One
- Season: 1995–96
- Champions: Gorleston
- Promoted: Gorleston; Warboys Town
- Matches: 272
- Goals: 1,012 (3.72 per match)

Division One featured 14 clubs which competed in the division last season, along with three new clubs:

- Chatteris Town, relegated from the Premier Division
- Histon, relegated from the Premier Division
- Whitton United, joined from the Suffolk & Ipswich League

=== League table ===
Pos	Team	Pld	W	D	L	GF	GA	GD	Pts	Promotion
1	Gorleston	32	26	4	2	100	30	+70	82	Promoted to the Premier Division
2	Warboys Town	32	22	7	3	79	33	+46	73	Promoted to the Premier Division
3	Ely City	32	19	6	7	82	40	+42	63	
4	Thetford Town	32	20	2	10	72	52	+20	62	
5	Ipswich Wanderers	32	17	8	7	87	41	+46	59	
6	Whitton United	32	15	10	7	67	43	+24	55	
7	Norwich United	32	14	7	11	58	46	+12	49	
8	Mildenhall Town	32	14	5	13	53	61	−8	47	
9	Swaffham Town	32	10	8	14	53	54	−1	38	
10	Brightlingsea United	32	8	11	13	44	61	−17	35	
11	Somersham Town	32	10	5	17	41	62	−21	35	
12	Downham Town	32	9	7	16	46	80	−34	34	
13	Histon	32	8	4	20	54	73	−19	28	
14	King's Lynn reserves	32	8	4	20	46	91	−45	28	Resigned from the league
15	Stanway Rovers	32	6	9	17	35	67	−32	27	
16	Chatteris Town	32	7	4	21	41	82	−41	25	
17	Bury Town reserves	32	6	5	21	54	96	−42	23	Resigned from the league

Source: fchd
Rules for classification: 1) points; 2) goal difference; 3) number of goals scored.
