= Cambridgeshire County Football League =

Association football league in England

- Country: England
- Confederation: Cambridgeshire County Football Association
- Divisions: 11
- Number of clubs: 147 (2025–26)
- Level on pyramid: Level 11 (Premier Division)
- Feeder to: Eastern Counties League (Division One) United Counties League (Division One) Spartan South Midlands League (Division 1&2)
- Domestic cups: Premier Division Knockout Cup; William Cockell Memorial Cup; Percy Oldham Memorial Cup; Creake Charity Shield; John Ablett Cup; Reg Haigh & Arthur Peck Cup
- Current champions: Great Shelford (2025-26)
- Website: Official Website

The Cambridgeshire County Football League, currently styled as the Adcock Cambridgeshire County League for sponsorship purposes, is a football league competition covering Cambridgeshire and western parts of Suffolk, Norfolk and northwestern parts of Essex in England. It has a total of 18 divisions, headed by the Premier Division. The Premier Division sits at step 7 (or level 11) of the National League System. Below the Premier Division lies the Senior A Division and Senior B Division. Below those two leagues, the structure splits into two parallel ladders of five divisions each. The Premier Division champions may apply for promotion to the Eastern Counties League Division One, the United Counties League Division One or the Spartan South Midlands League but few take up the offer. For instance, at the end of the 2021–22 season, Great Shelford, traditionally one of the stronger sides in the league, were the Premier Division champions, but did not apply for promotion. However, Eaton Socon FC, who finished fourth in the same season, were successful in their application to join the SSMFL Division One as they were the only club with the correct ground grading required for step 6 football.

== Member clubs 2026–27 ==
The constitution for season 2026-2027 is as follows:

Go Cardless Premier Division

Club	Home ground
Cambridge City Reserves	Grove Road, Sawston
Ely City Reserves	The Demcom Stadium, Ely
Foxton	Hardman Road, Foxton
Great Shelford	Woollards Lane, Great Shelford
Hardwick	Egremont Road, Hardwick
Hemingfords United	Manor Road, Hemingford Grey
Milton	The Sycamores, Milton
Over Sports	The Doles, Over
Saffron Walden Town Reserves	Catons Lane, Saffron Walden
Sawston United	Spicers Sports Ground, Sawston
Soham Town Rangers Reserves	Julius Martin Lane, Soham
West Wratting	Bull Lane, West Wratting
Wimblington	Parkfield Sports Club, Wimblington
Wisbech St Mary	Beechings Close, Wisbech St Mary
Witchford 96	Bedwell Hey Lane, Witchford

Go Cardless Senior Division A

Club	Home ground
Eaton Socon Reserves	River Road, Eaton Ford
Fordham	Carter Street, Fordham
Gamlingay United	Stocks Lane, Gamlingay
Great Shelford Reserves	Woollards Lane, Great Shelford
Hartford Rangers	Hinchingbrooke School, Huntingdon
Haverhill Rovers Reserves	The New Croft, Haverhill
Histon Reserves	Bridge Road, Impington
Huntingdon United	Jubilee Park, Huntingdon
Isleham United	Mill Street, Isleham
March Town United U23	Robingoodfellows Lane, March
Orwell	Eternit Sports and Social Club, Meldreth
Somersham Town	St Ives Road, Somersham
West Wratting Reserves	Bull Lane, West Wratting
Wisbech Town Reserves	Fenland Stadium, Wisbech

Go Cardless Senior Division B

Club	Home ground
Abington United	High Street, Great Abington
Comberton United	Hines Lane, Comberton
Cottenham United	King George V Playing Field, Cottenham
Fenstanton	Hall Green Lane, Fenstanton
Hemingfords United Reserves	Manor Road, Hemingford Grey
Histon Hornets	New Road, Impington
Lakenheath Reserves	Wings Road, Lakenheath
Linton Granta	Meadow Lane, Linton
Littleport Town	Camel Road, Littleport
Longstanton	Western Park, Northstowe
Outwell Swifts	Wisbech Road, Outwell
Over Sports Reserves	The Doles, Over
Sawston Rovers	Mill Lane, Sawston
Stretham	Wilburton Road, Stretham

Division 1A

Club	Home ground
Barrington	West Green, Barrington
Bassingbourn	South End, Bassingbourn cum Kneesworth
Cambourne Town	Back Lane, Cambourne
Clare Town	Cavendish Road, Clare
Comberton United Reserves	Hines Lane, Comberton
Foxton Reserves	Hardman Road, Foxton
Guilden Morden	Fox Hill Road, Guilden Morden
Hardwick Reserves	Egremont Road, Hardwick
Melbourn	Melbourn Village College, Melbourn
Milton Reserves	The Sycamores, Milton
Sawston United Reserves	Spicers Sports Ground, Sawston
Thaxted Rangers	Audley End Road, Saffron Walden
Whittlesford United	The Lawn, Whittlesford
Wilbrahams	Angle End, Great Wilbraham

Division 1B

Club	Home ground
Alconbury Weston	Great North Road, Alconbury
Beach	Cambridge Road, Waterbeach
Burwell	Hythe Lane, Burwell
Chatteris Town	West Street, Chatteris
Crusaders 2019	Camel Road, Littleport
Eynesbury Rovers Reserves	One Leisure, St Neots
Houghton & Wyton	St Ives Road, Houghton
Mepal and Sutton	Witcham Road, Mepal
Needingworth United	Millfields, Needingworth
Oakington Vikings	Comberton Village College, Comberton
Swavesey Institute	High Street, Swavesey
The Eagle	George Lambton Playing Fields, Newmarket
Willingham Wolves	Western Park, Northstowe
Wisbech St Mary Reserves	Beechings Close, Wisbech St Mary

Division 2A

Club	Home ground
Cambridge Ambassadors	Anglian Leisure, Bottisham
Cambridge Cobras	Albert Road, Stow cum Quy
Elsenham	Anglian Leisure Joyce Frankland, Newport
Fulbourn Institute	Home End, Fulbourn
Harston	The Limes, Cambridge
Haverhill Town	Mott's Field, Haverhill
Linton Granta Reserves	Meadow Lane, Linton
Litlington	South Street, Litlington
Saffron Walden Town 'A'	Lime Avenue, Saffron Walden
Thurlow	Wratting Road, Thurlow
Trumpington Rovers	King George V Playing Field, Cambridge
Walden United	Anglian Leisure, Linton
West Wratting 'A'	Stetchworth Road, Dullingham

Division 2B

Club	Home ground
AFC Mildenhall	Recreation Way, Mildenhall
Bar Hill	The Spinney, Bar Hill
Buckden	Burberry Road, Buckden
FC Kennett	The Green, Tuddenham
Girton United	Cambridge Road, Girton
Great Paxton	High Street, Great Paxton
Little Paxton	Priory Park, St Neots
Longstanton Reserves	Western Park, Northstowe
Mott MacDonald	Cambridge Road, Girton
Soham Town Rangers U23	Soham Village College, Soham
Soham United	Qua Fen Common, Soham
Swavesey Institute Reserves	Swavesey Village College, Swavesey
Wicken Amateurs	Chapel Lane, Wicken

Division 2C

Club	Home ground
Alconbury Weald	Great North Road, Alconbury
Beach Reserves	Cambridge Road, Waterbeach
Bluntisham Rangers	Mill Lane, Bluntisham
Brampton	Thrapston Road, Brampton
Chatteris Town Reserves	West Street, Chatteris
Fenstanton Reserves	Hall Green Lane, Fenstanton
Huntingdon United Reserves	Jubilee Park, Huntingdon
Manea United	SM Guy Memorial Playing Field, Manea
March Town United 'A'	Estover Playing Fields, March
Needingworth United Reserves	Millfields, Needingworth
Willingham Wolves Reserves	Western Park, Northstowe
Wimblington Reserves	Parkfield Sports Club, Wimblington
Witchford 96 Reserves	Bedwell Hey Lane, Witchford

Division 3A

Club	Home ground
Barrington Reserves	West Green, Barrington
Clare Town Reserves	Cavendish Road, Clare
Haverhill Town Reserves	Mott's Field, Haverhill
Haverhill Town 'B'	Wickhambrook
Hundon	North Street, Hundon
Litlington Reserves	South Street, Litlington
Meldreth United	Eternit Sports and Social Club, Meldreth
Sawston Lightning	Lynton Way, Sawston
Sawston Rovers Reserves	Mill Lane, Sawston
Sawston United 'A'	Lynton Way, Sawston
Thaxted Rangers Reserves	County High Sports Centre, Saffron Walden
Thurlow Reserves	Wratting Road, Thurlow
Whittlesford United Reserves	The Lawn, Whittlesford

Division 3B

Club	Home ground
Buckden Reserves	Burberry Road, Buckden
Burwell Reserves	Hythe Lane, Burwell
Cambridge Ambassadors Reserves	Anglian Leisure, Bottisham
Cherry Hinton	High Street, Cherry Hinton
FC Kennett Reserves	Station Road, Kennett
Great Paxton United	High Street, Great Paxton
Hardwick 'A'	Egremont Road, Hardwick
Histon Hornets Reserves	New Road, Impington
Isleham United Reserves	Mill Street, Isleham
Milton 'A'	The Sycamores, Milton
St Neots Wanderers	Priory Park, St Neots
St Neots Wanderers Development	Priory Park, St Neots
Stretham Reserves	Wilburton Road, Stretham
Wilbrahams Reserves	Angle End, Great Wilbraham

Division 3C

Club	Home ground
AFC Ely	Pymoor Lane, Pymoor
Alconbury Weald Reserves	Great North Road, Alconbury
Benwick Athletic	Dack Field, Doddington
Chatteris Town 'A'	West Street, Chatteris
Hemingfords United Development	Manor Road, Hemingford Grey
Hinchingbrooke United	Hinchingbrooke School, Huntingdon
Littleport Rangers	Camel Road, Littleport
March Academy	Neale Wade Sports Centre, March
Marshland Saints Reserves	Smeeth Road, Marshland St James
Mepal and Sutton Reserves	Brookland Centre, Sutton-in-the-Isle
Outwell Swifts Reserves	Wisbech Road, Outwell
St Ives Rangers	St Ivo Outdoor Complex, St Ives
Wisbech St Mary Development 'A'	Beechings Close, Wisbech St Mary
Wisbech Town Acorns	Wolf Lane, Gorefield

== Recent Premier Division champions ==
- 1999–2000: Over Sports
- 2000–01: Histon Reserves (promoted)
- 2001–02: Sawston United
- 2002–03: Sawston United
- 2003–04: Fulbourn Institute
- 2004–05: Fulbourn Institute (promoted)
- 2005–06: Sawston United
- 2006–07: Great Shelford
- 2007–08: Waterbeach
- 2008–09: Fulbourn Institute
- 2009–10: Fulbourn Institute
- 2010–11: Lakenheath
- 2011–12: Linton Granta
- 2012–13: Great Shelford
- 2013–14: Over Sports
- 2014–15: Great Shelford
- 2015–16: Great Shelford
- 2016–17: Hardwick
- 2017–18: West Wratting
- 2018–19: Great Shelford
- 2019-20: Season declared NULL AND VOID
- 2020-21: Season declared NULL AND VOID - Cup competitions being played
- 2021-22: Great Shelford
- 2022-23: West Wratting
- 2023–24: Great Shelford
- 2024–25: Great Shelford
- 2025–26: Great Shelford
