= 1989–90 Essex Senior Football League =

The 1989–90 season was the 19th in the history of Essex Senior Football League a football competition in England.

The league featured 16 clubs which competed in the league last season, no new clubs joined the league this season.

Brightlingsea United were champions, winning their second Essex Senior League title in a row and transferred to the Eastern Counties League.

== League table ==
Essex Senior Football League
- Season: 1989–90
- Champions: Brightlingsea United
- Matches: 240
- Goals: 818 (3.41 per match)

Pos	Team	Pld	W	D	L	GF	GA	GD	Pts	Promotion or relegation
1	Brightlingsea United	30	21	5	4	70	22	+48	68	Transferred to the Eastern Counties League
2	Woodford Town	30	19	7	4	64	35	+29	64	
3	East Thurrock United	30	16	8	6	64	29	+35	56	
4	Canvey Island	30	15	10	5	76	34	+42	55	
5	Sawbridgeworth Town	30	15	7	8	67	46	+21	52	
6	Stambridge	30	14	8	8	66	37	+29	50	
7	Brentwood	30	14	7	9	55	40	+15	49	
8	Burnham Ramblers	30	12	8	10	62	45	+17	44	
9	Ford United	30	13	5	12	48	50	−2	44	
10	Southend Manor	30	12	6	12	52	42	+10	42	
11	Bowers United	30	12	5	13	42	40	+2	41	
12	Eton Manor	30	8	4	18	34	56	−22	28	
13	Stansted	30	8	3	19	31	77	−46	27	
14	Chelmsford City reserves	30	7	5	18	38	57	−19	26	Resigned from the league
15	Maldon Town	30	6	4	20	32	84	−52	22	
16	East Ham United	30	1	2	27	17	124	−107	5	

Source: fchd
Rules for classification: 1) points; 2) goal difference; 3) number of goals scored.
