= Great Shelford F.C. =

Association football club in England

Coordinates: 52°8′44″N 0°8′4″E

Great Shelford FC
- Full name: Great Shelford Football Club
- Founded: 1912
- Ground: Woollards Lane, Great Shelford
- Manager: Chris Gethins
- League: Cambridgeshire League Premier Division
- 2024–25: Cambridgeshire League Premier Division, 1st of 13
Home colours

Great Shelford Football Club are a football club based in Great Shelford, near Cambridge, England. Established in 1912, they currently play in the Cambridgeshire League Premier Division.

== History ==
The club was founded in 1912, and has played at Woollards Lane since 1920. Between 1975 and 1990 the club won twelve league titles, as well as the Cambridgeshire Invitation Cup in 1980–81, 1986–87 and 1987–88. They also entered the FA Vase between 1985 and 1989, beating Eastern Counties League opposition on three occasions.

The club have won the Premier Division of the Cambridgeshire League on multiple occasions, as well as both the Cliff Bullen Cup, and the Premier Division Cup.

== Honours ==
- Cambridgeshire League
  - Premier Division champions 2006–07, 2012–13, 2014–15, 2015–16, 2018–19, 2021–22, 2023–24, 2024-25
  - Premier Division Cup winners 1966–67, 2010–11, 2024-25
- Cambridgeshire Invitation Cup
  - Winners 1980–81, 1986–87, 1987–88
