= Great Shelford =

Village in Cambridgeshire, England

Coordinates: 52.1503°N 0.1357°E

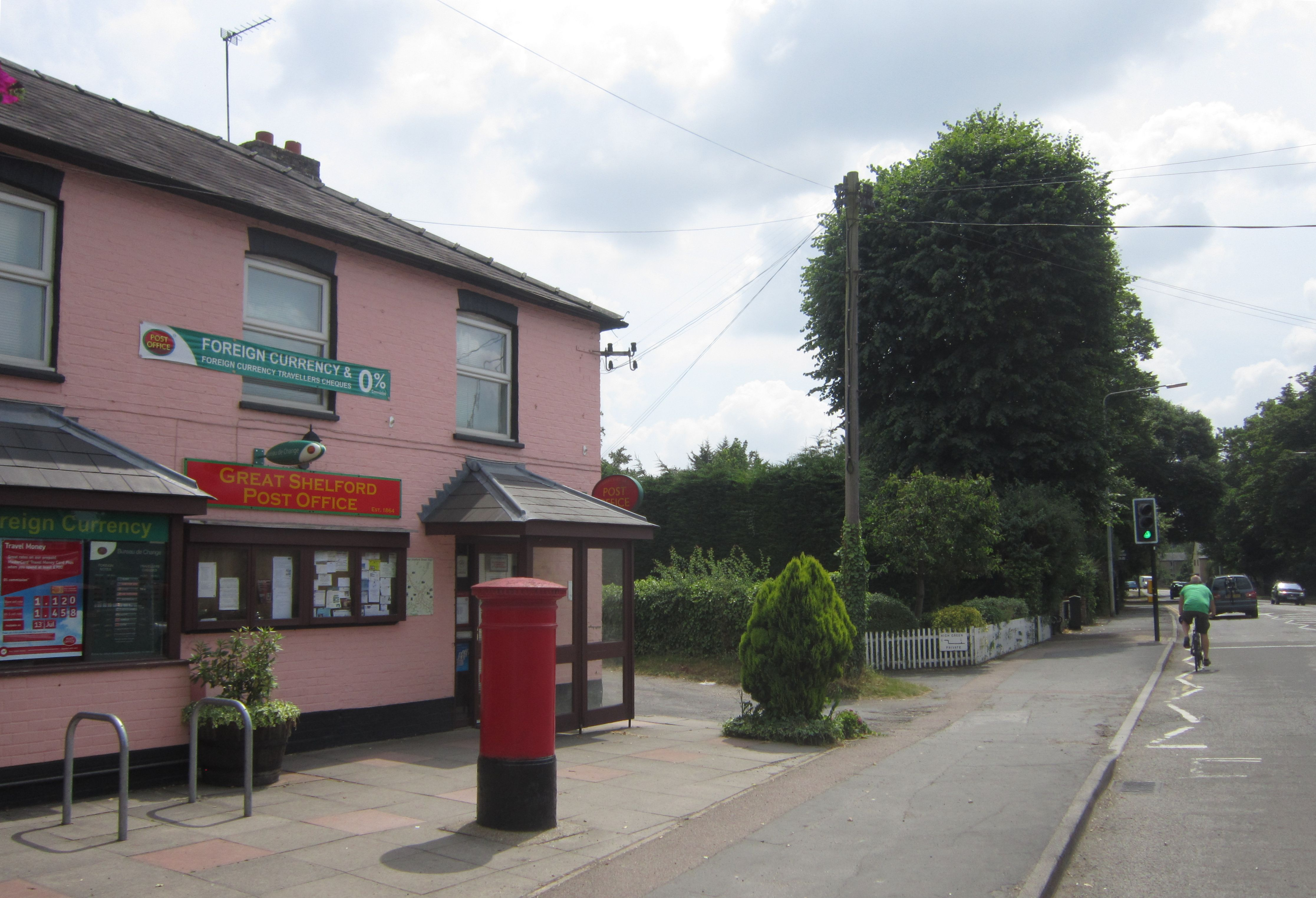
- Village centre and former post office

- Location within Cambridgeshire
- Population: 4,233 (2011)
- OS grid reference: TL464521
- District: South Cambridgeshire
- Shire county: Cambridgeshire
- Region: East
- Country: England
- Sovereign state: United Kingdom
- Post town: Cambridge
- Postcode district: CB22
- Dialling code: 01223
- Police: Cambridgeshire
- Fire: Cambridgeshire
- Ambulance: East of England
- UK Parliament: South Cambridgeshire

Great Shelford is a village located approximately 4 miles (6.4 km) to the south of Cambridge, in Cambridgeshire, in eastern England. In 1850 Great Shelford parish contained 1,900 acres (7.7 km^{2}) bisected by the River Cam. The population in 1841 was 803 people. By 2001, this had grown to 3,949 and by the Census 2011 to 4,233. It was described as Britain's twenty-second richest village in 2011.

Great Shelford is twinned with Verneuil-en-Halatte, in the Oise département of France.

== Services and culture ==
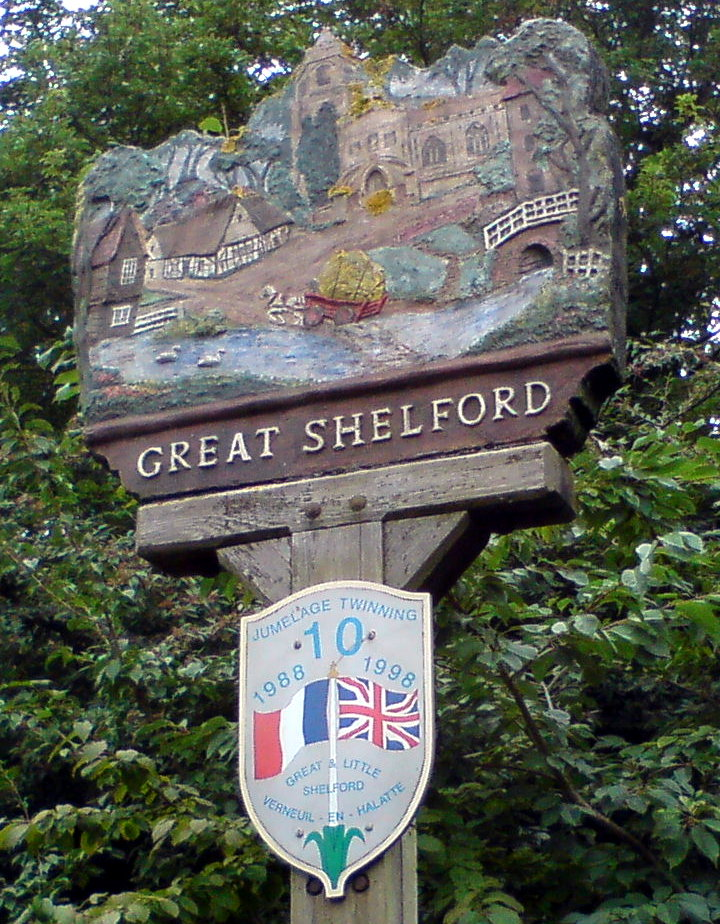
Village sign

Great Shelford has a range of shops and services, including a wine merchant/bar, two public houses, two restaurants, a library, several estate agents, two barbers, a building society, a chemist, a dentist, a solicitor, an accountant, a delicatessen, a bakery and a garden centre. There is a monthly Farmers' Market. The villages of Great and Little Shelford are served by Shelford railway station on the West Anglia Main Line from Cambridge to London Liverpool Street. The old Great Shelford library was demolished and replaced by a new building which incorporates affordable housing by Bedfordshire Pilgrims Housing Association.

A large country house in the village was used for a concert named 'The Tea Set' in October 1965, which featured performances from Pink Floyd, Jokers Wild and Paul Simon. The same house was also used again in 1969 as the location for the cover art of Pink Floyd's album Ummagumma.

The Shelford Delicatessen features in a 2008 list by The Independent of The 50 Best Delicatessens in Britain.

== Notable buildings ==
=== Parish church ===
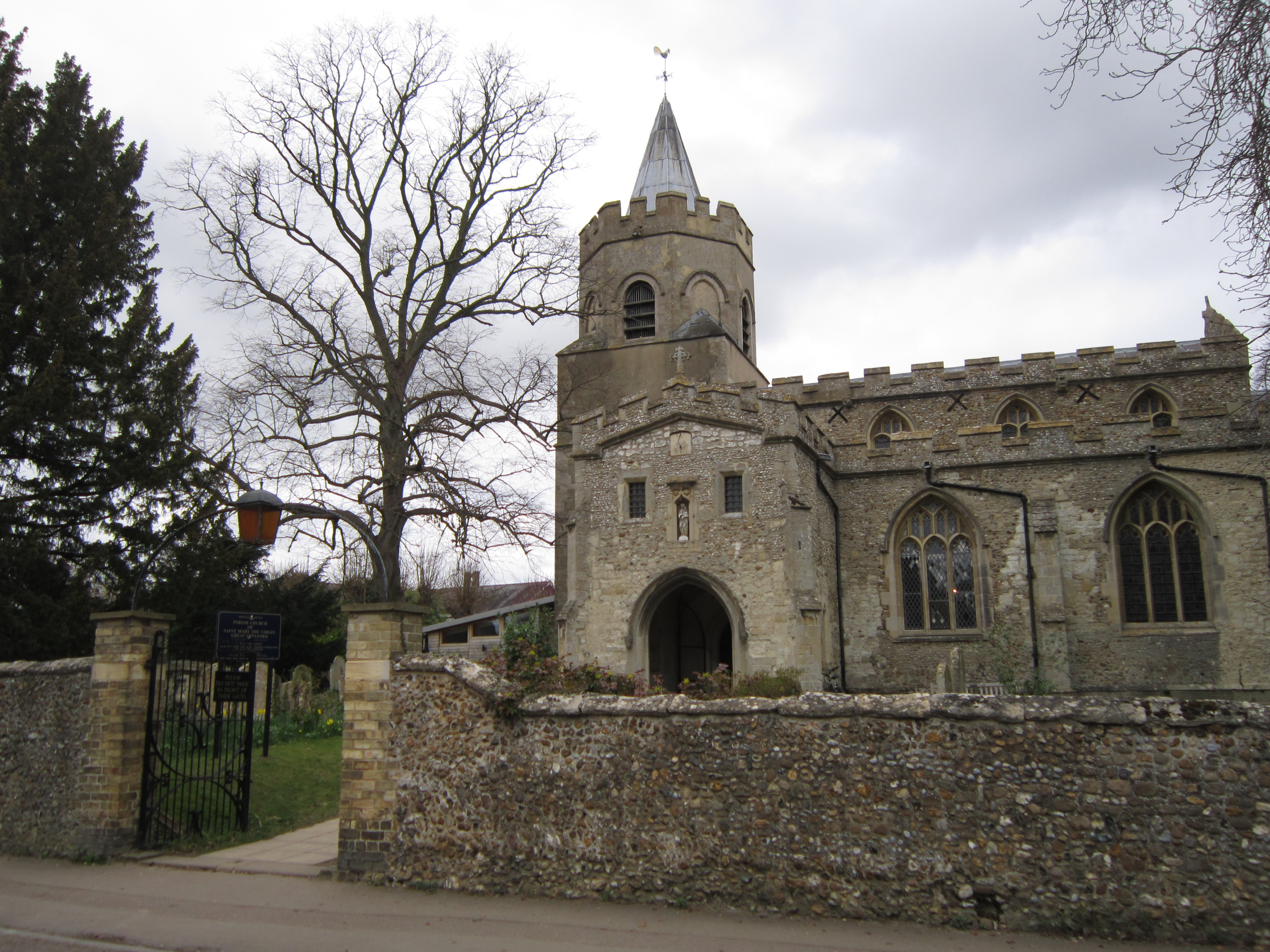
St Mary the Virgin's Church, Great Shelford

The 80ft tall parish church of Saint Mary the Virgin has changed little since Thomas Patesle rebuilt it in 1387; he can be seen in a monumental brass in his vicar's robes on the chancel floor. The tower was rebuilt with the original materials after its collapse in 1798, caused by a storm that destroyed half of the church.

The church porch is two-storeyed with a splendid pelican in its fine vaulted roof, the doorway having an old niche with a Madonna. The spacious interior has tall arcades with medieval clerestories over them and heads between the arches, and eight fine oak angels look down from the hammerbeams of the roof. There is a 15th-century screen with tracery in the north aisle enclosing an altar in memory of a soldier killed on the Indian frontier; above the altar is a painting of two saints and a Roman soldier by the cross. The chancel stalls are carved with wild roses, the sedilia with grapes and acorns, and the reredos has a gleaming white sculpture of the Crucifixion with saints and angels under rich canopies. There are a few fragments of old glass, fragments of Norman carving set in a wall, and above the chancel arch a medieval painting of Doom, fading away.

=== Houses ===
De Freville Farm is a 16th-century timber-framed farmhouse with hall and cross wings. Oak Cottage is also 16th century and has a richly carved bressumer. Maris Farmhouse is a listed 16th-century cottage in half an acre of garden with a disused pump for the area. It is built from unsawn logs, with wattle and daub walls, and with the exterior rendered. The roof was originally thatched and was probably in the style of nearby properties.

== History ==
=== Manors and families ===
Several great estates shared the two Shelfords, notably that of the de Freville family, whose manor house survives (and was resold in 2005) at Little Shelford, and who were there as early as 1300. But all appear to have generally had absentee landlords who sold copyhold lands and generally let others on long renewable leases. Farming survived at Great Shelford well into the 20th century. Several Yeoman families of note, the Deans, Howling, and Tunwell families, farmed here for centuries.

One example is Richard Tunwell (1645–1713) who acquired land at Great Shelford, his first acquisition being a mere 1-acre (4,000 m^{2}) of pasture, a copse and a close which was copyhold land belonging to the Bury manor. When Freville's Manor was purchased [as superior proprietor] by William Freeman in 1701, the lands in Great Shelford belonging to the Manor were described as 142 acres (0.57 km^{2}) of arable, 10 acres (40,000 m^{2}) and a half a rood of meadow, 8.5 acres (34,000 m^{2}) of pasture, a sheepwalk or liberty of foldage and fold course for six store ewes, all by then in the occupation of Richard Tunwell. The Manor also had 0.5-acre (2,000 m^{2}) of meadow in Little Shelford which again was occupied by Richard Tunwell. A rent roll of the Manor of Granhams dated 1708 shows that Tunwell and his sons held copyhold land from that Manor as well. From 1678 onwards, Richard Tunwell served as a Juror on the Bury Baron Court. By 1705, as a landed proprietor, he had qualified as a parliamentary voter and the Poll Book for the election held in that year shows that he voted for Sir Richard Cullen and John Bromley.

The Killingworth family also owned land at Shelford, as when Richard Killingworth of Great Bradley in Suffolk, gentleman, made his will on 12 September 1586, he left the following legacies to the poor – of Fulbourne £10; Balsham (where his son John held the manor) £10; Great Shelford £5; Little Shelford £5; and Cambridge £20.

=== Historical geography ===
Great Shelford was colonised by academics of the University of Cambridge in Victorian times; in the 20th century it became a home for commuters. However the original settlement pattern can still be traced. The core of the modern village lies between the sites of two Anglo-Saxon settlements one of which itself occupied the site of a Romano-British village and the other was nearer to Little Shelford.

== Education ==
Shelford is home to Great and Little Shelford CofE (A) Primary School. In 2023 it had 211 pupils and in 2018 obtained a "Good" Ofsted rating. In 2023 the school continued to receive a "Good" Ofsted rating except for behaviour and attitudes which was rated at needs improvement. The headteacher is Christopher Grey.

== Sport and activities ==
Shelford's Rugby Union team, Shelford RFC, competes in the R.F.U.'s National League 2 South, and plays its home fixtures at its ground on Cambridge Road, in the north of the village. Great Shelford Cricket Club plays in the Cambridgeshire & Huntingdon Premier League Division 2. In 2017 the club boasts 3 Senior sides and 4 Junior teams. The first team finished a club record 3rd in the league, winning 8 games consecutively to conclude the 2017 season. The cricket club shares a ground with Cambridgeshire League football club, Great Shelford F.C.; however the Cricket Club played all home team first eleven fixtures at Cokenach CC for the 2018 season.

Shelfords and Stapleford have an active Scout Group with a Beaver Colony, a Cub Pack and a Scout Troop. GirlGuiding has a Guide group, Brownies and Rainbows. All these groups meet in the Scout and Guide HQ within the village.

== Notable people ==
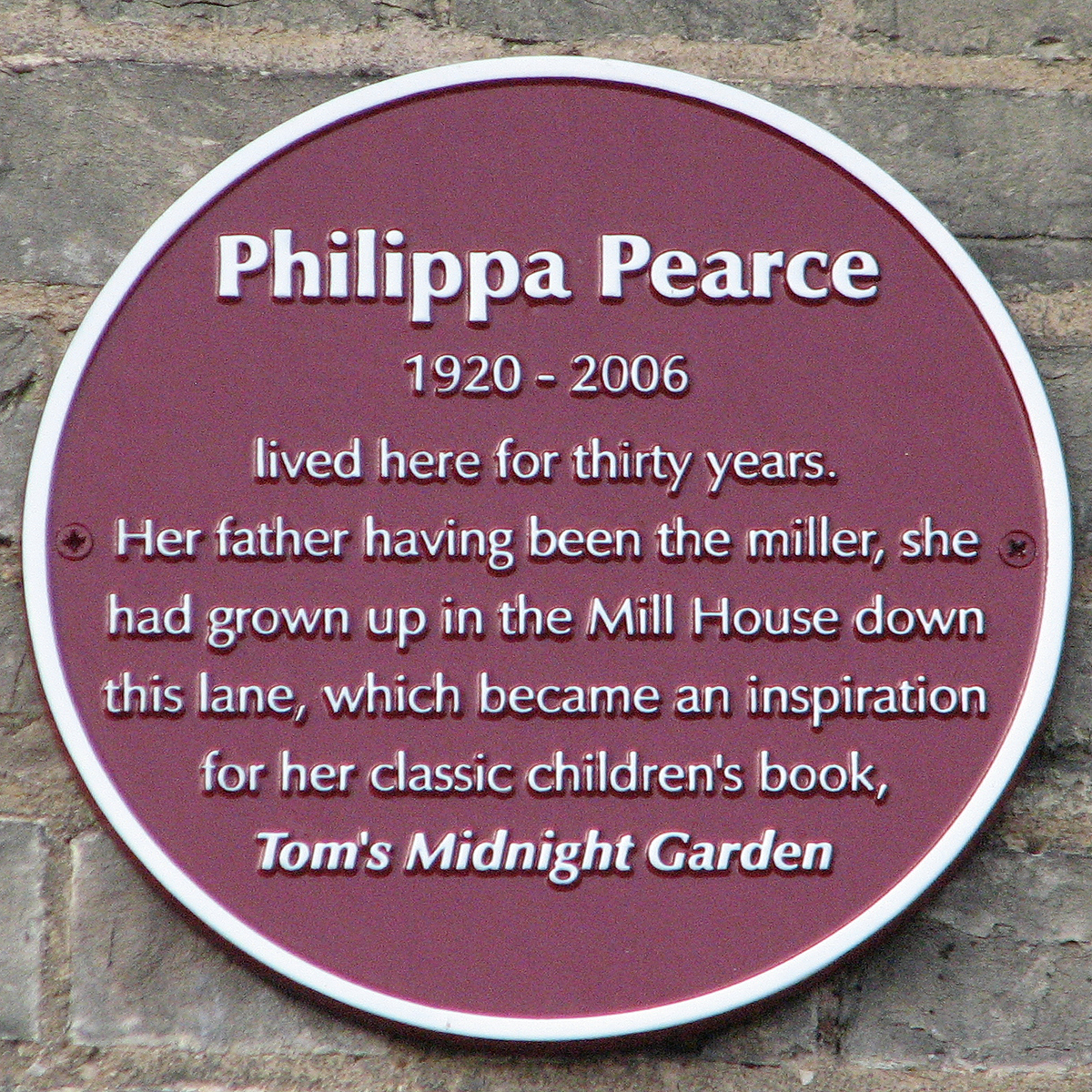
Memorial plaque on Philippa Pearce's former house, 4 Kings Mill Lane, in Great Shelford

Great Shelford was home to children's author Philippa Pearce, who renamed it "Great Barley" (with the neighbouring village of Little Shelford becoming "Little Barley", and Cambridge itself becoming "Castleford" and losing its university) in her books, most notably Minnow on the Say (1955). In this and other books the River Cam, which flows through the village, became the River Say. The writer was brought up in Great Shelford and after some years in London lived there again from 1973 to her death in 2006. Sir Peter Hall, the theatrical director, lived in the station house as a child and the author Tom Sharpe had a house in the village. Writer Michael J. Bird lived in Great Shelford in his last years.

The ancestry of US President Barack Obama was traced to the village in 2009, bringing Great Shelford into the national media.

== Events ==
The Shelford Festival and Feast takes place every year in the 2nd week of July. The origins of the Shelford Feast date back to medieval times. The Feast continued until the Second World War, the last one being held in 1938 until revived in 1994. Since 1994 The Shelford Feast has been held every year except 2020, and by 2026 had donated £435,000 to local good causes. The next Shelford Feast will start on 3rd of July, 2027 with a festival events from July 3 to 10.

== Bibliography ==
- History, Gazetteer and Directory of Cambridgeshire, published by Robert Gardner, Peterborough, 1851.
- Bullwinkle, Alan (February 1984). "The Tunwells of Fulbourn and Great Shelford". Cambridgeshire Family History Society Journal. 4 (5). Cambridge: 123–125.
- Mee, Arthur, Cambridgeshire; new rev. ed. (The King's England.) London: Hodder & Stoughton, 1965, p. 140.
