= Needingworth =

Village in Cambridgeshire, England

Coordinates: 52.32°N 0.017°W

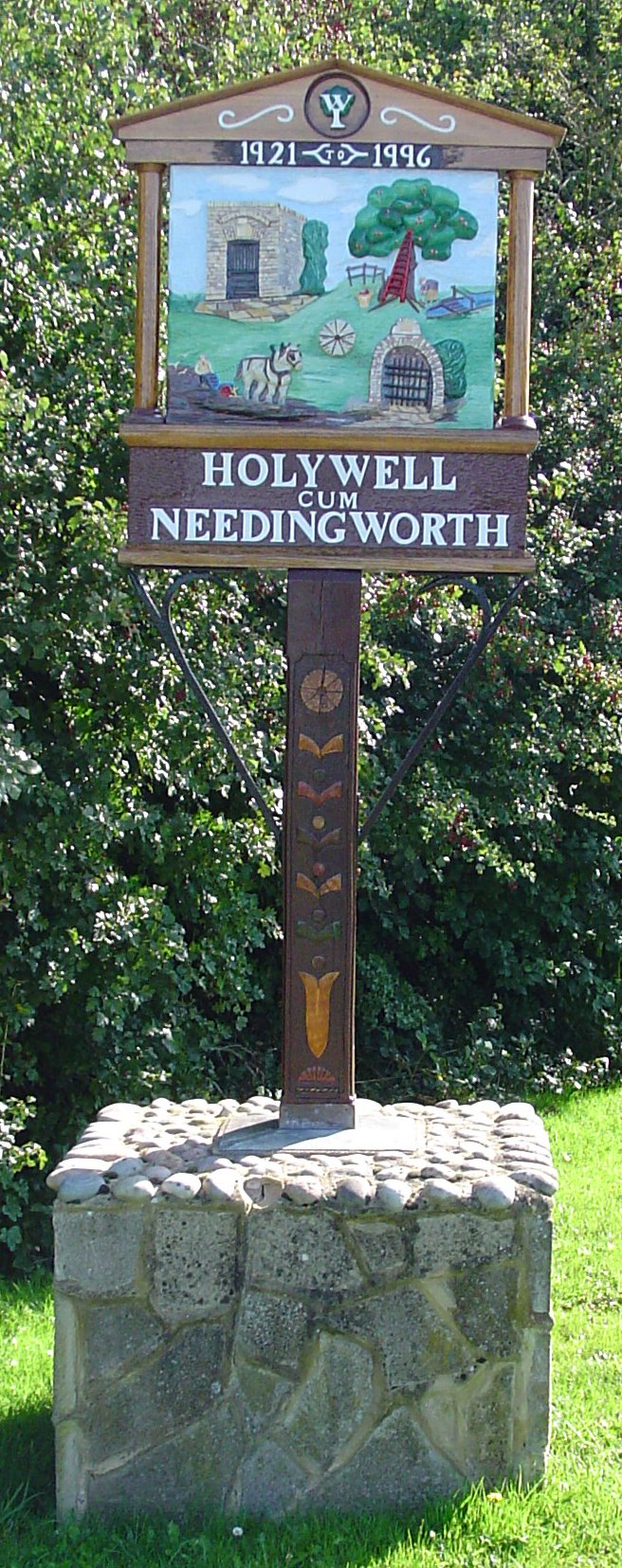
- Village sign in Holywell cum Needingworth

- Location within Cambridgeshire
- OS grid reference: TL351706
- Civil parish: Holywell-cum-Needingworth
- District: Huntingdonshire
- Shire county: Cambridgeshire
- Region: East
- Country: England
- Sovereign state: United Kingdom
- Post town: St Ives
- Postcode district: PE27
- Police: Cambridgeshire
- Fire: Cambridgeshire
- Ambulance: East of England
- UK Parliament: North West Cambridgeshire

Needingworth is a village in Cambridgeshire, England. Needingworth lies approximately 7 miles (11 km) east of Huntingdon and just west of the Prime Meridian, as seen in its latitude below. Needingworth is in the civil parish of Holywell-cum-Needingworth. Needingworth is situated within Huntingdonshire which is a non-metropolitan district of Cambridgeshire as well as being a historic county of England. The village is attached to Holywell by a single road, connecting the two villages.

== Governance ==
Needingworth is part of the civil parish of Holywell-cum-Needingworth, which has a parish council. The parish council consists of fourteen councillors and has a parish clerk; the parish council normally meets once a month.

Needingworth was in the historic and administrative county of Huntingdonshire until 1965. From 1965, the village was part of the new administrative county of Huntingdon and Peterborough. Then in 1974, following the Local Government Act 1972, Needingworth became a part of the county of Cambridgeshire.

The second tier of local government is Huntingdonshire District Council which is a non-metropolitan district of Cambridgeshire and has its headquarters in Huntingdon. Huntingdonshire District Council has 52 councillors representing 29 district wards. Needingworth is a part of the district ward of Earith and is represented on the district council by two councillors. District councillors serve for four-year terms following elections to Huntingdonshire District Council.

For Needingworth the highest tier of local government is Cambridgeshire County Council which has administration buildings in Cambridge. Cambridgeshire County Council consists of 69 councillors representing 60 electoral divisions. Needingworth is part of the electoral division of Somersham and Earith and is represented on the county council by one councillor.

At Westminster Needingworth is in the parliamentary constituency of North West Cambridgeshire, which is represented in the House of Commons by Shailesh Vara (Conservative). Shailesh Vara has represented the constituency since 2005. The previous member of parliament was Brian Mawhinney (Conservative) who represented the constituency between 1997 and 2005.

== Culture and community ==
There is only one shop, currently a 'One Stop', which is also a Post Office on the Needingworth high street. There are also two pubs (not including the Ferry Boat Inn in Holywell) in Needingworth, The Pike and Eel and The Queen's Head.

There is a Church-of-England primary school, a village hall with bowls club and various good walks in the area. Also tennis courts.

The Villager is the local newsletter of the area, a copy of which is delivered free to every household in the parish of Holywell-cum-Needingworth.

The drama club is the Wellworth Players, a long established amateur theatre club taking their name from Needingworth and Holywell. They have won several awards for their plays and pantomimes. These events are staged in Needingworth Village Hall.

This is the only settlement in the world to carry the name Needingworth.

Famous residents include Ambrose Nicholas, a former Lord Mayor of London.

== The quarry ==
There is a significant aggregate extraction operation based just to the east of Needingworth. The quarry will be turned into wetland with the co-operation of the RSPB. The resulting 600 hectares (1,483 acres) wetland will constitute 50% of the UK's reedbed target.

== Bus services ==
There are two bus routes serving the village;

- Route A (Busway, Stagecoach in Huntingdonshire) to St Ives and Cambridge (peak times only)
- 301 (Dews Coaches) to St Ives or Somersham/Ramsey
