= Fulbourn Institute F.C. =

Association football club in England

Fulbourn Institute
- Full name: Fulbourn Institute Football Club
- Founded: 1902
- Ground: Recreation Ground
- Chairman: Richard Drage
- Manager: Martin McNulty
- League: Cambridgeshire League Division Two A
- 2024–25: Cambridgeshire League Division Two A, 6th of 12

Fulbourn Institute Football Club is a football club based in Fulbourn, Cambridgeshire, England. The club are currently members of the Cambridgeshire League Division Two A and play at the Recreation Ground.

== History ==
The club were established in 1902. The joined the Cambridgeshire League in the 1920s and were Division 3B champions in 1925–26. They were promoted to Division Two, and were known as Fulbourne Athletic for a while, before reverting to their current name at the start of the 1930s. They won the Cambridgeshire Junior Cup in 1931–32 and by 1933 had reached Division 1A. In 1970–71 they were promoted to the Premier Division as Division 1A champions.

In 2002–03 they won Senior Division A and were again promoted to the Premier Division, which they went on to win in 2003–04 and 2004–05. Following their second title they were promoted to the Eastern Counties League Division One. Despite finishing in third position, which would have earned them promotion to the Premier Division, the club were forced into resigning from the league at the end of their first season in the ECL as their ground did not meet the league's requirements and planning permission for improvements had not been approved.

As a result, they dropped into the Senior A Division of the Cambridgeshire League. At the end of the 2007–08 season they were promoted back to the Premier Division after finishing as runners-up, earning promotion to the Premier Division. The following season they won the Premier Division, as well as the Premier Cup and Cambridgeshire Challenge Cup. In 2009–10 they won the Premier Division for the second consecutive season.

== Honours ==
- Cambridgeshire League
  - Premier Division champions 2003–04, 2004–05, 2008–09, 2009–10
  - Premier League cup winners 1984–85, 1989–90, 2003–04, 2004–05, 2008–09
  - Senior Division A champions 2002–03
  - Division 1A champions 1970–71
  - Division 3B champions 1926–26
- Cambridgeshire Challenge Cup
  - Winners 2008–09
- Cambridgeshire Junior Cup
  - Winners 1931–32
