= Sawston United F.C. =

Association football club in England

Sawston United
- Full name: Sawston United Football Club
- Nickname: United
- Founded: 1946
- Ground: Spicers Sports Ground
- Chairman: Paul Wilson
- Manager: Oliver Borley
- League: Cambridgeshire League Senior Division A
- 2024–25: Cambridgeshire League Senior Division A, 1st of 14 (promoted)
- Website: http://www.sawstonunitedfc.teamexpert.co.uk/
| Home colours | Away colours |

Sawston United Football Club is a football club based in Sawston, England. They are currently members of the Cambridgeshire League Senior Division A. The club is affiliated to the Cambridgeshire County Football Association.

== History ==
The club was formed in 1946. The club entered the FA Cup in 1948, losing 2–8 to Parson Drove in the preliminary round.

The team has played in local leagues, playing in the Peterborough Football league in the 1950s. The club then moved at some time to the Cambridgeshire County Football League, winning the league on several occasions.

The end of the 2017–18 season saw the club finish second bottom of the Premier Division, but instead of being relegated to the division below, the club was relegated 4 divisions to Division 2a. The team finished as runners-up of Division 2a a season later and gained promotion to Division 1a.

== Ground ==
The club play their home games at Spicers Sports Ground.

== Honours ==
- Cambridgeshire County Football League
  - Premier Division champions (3) 2001–02, 2002–03, 2005–06
  - Senior B champions(1) 2008–09
  - Senior A champions(1) 2008–09
  - Division One A champions(3) 1995–96, 2007–08, 2023-24
  - Division Three A champions(1) 2021-22
  - Kershaw Premier League Cup (1) 2001–02
- Cliff Bullen Saturday Challenge Cup
  - Winners (3) 1998–99, 2001–02, 2006–07
- Foster Challenge Cup
  - Winners (1) 2011–12
- William Cockell Memorial Cup
  - Winners (1) 2011–12
- William Coad League Cup
  - Winners (1) 2022-23
