= Gorleston F.C. =

Association football club in England

Coordinates: 52°36′45″N 1°44′10″E

Gorleston
- Full name: Gorleston Football Club
- Nickname: The Greens
- Founded: 1887
- Ground: Wellesley Recreation Ground, Great Yarmouth
- Capacity: 3,600 (500 seated)
- Chairman: Jamie Humphries
- Manager: Darren Cockerill
- League: Isthmian League North Division
- 2025–26: Isthmian League North Division, 6th of 22
Home colours	Away colours

Gorleston Football Club is a football club based in Gorleston, Norfolk, England. They are currently members of the Isthmian League North Division and play at the Wellesley Recreation Ground in Great Yarmouth.

== History ==
The club was established on 27 September 1887 by members of Gorleston Cricket Club looking for a winter sport, and were initially nicknamed the "Cards", playing in crimson shirts and blue shorts. Their first competitive match was a game against Beccles Caxton in the Suffolk Senior Cup (at the time, Gorleston was part of Suffolk), losing 1–0. In 1900 they joined the Aldred League. In 1903 the club began playing in green shirts and white shorts, and in 1905–06 they were Aldred League champions, winning fifteen and drawing one of their sixteen matches. In 1906–07 they won the Norfolk Junior Cup. At the end of the season the Aldred League became the Yarmouth & District League; the club went on to win the league in its first season under the new name, winning all fourteen matches. At the end of the season they joined the Norfolk & Suffolk League. In 1909–10 they also entered a team into Division One North of the East Anglian League, but withdrew after one season.

Gorleston won the Norfolk & Suffolk League in 1920–21. They also entered a team into the East Anglian League again, although the reserves replaced them the following season. They were runners-up in the next three seasons, also winning the Norfolk Senior Cup in 1921–22 and 1922–23. In 1925–26 they did the double, winning the league and the Senior Cup. After finishing as runners-up in 1927–28 and 1928–29 and winning the Senior Cup again in 1927–28, they won the league for a third time in 1929–30. They were runners-up and Senior Cup winners in 1930–31, and went on to win four consecutive league titles between 1931–32 and 1934–35. They also won the East Anglian Cup in 1931–32 and the Senior Cup in 1932–33.

In 1935 Gorleston were founder members of the Eastern Counties League. Their final trophy before World War II was the Senior Cup in 1937–38, beating local rivals Great Yarmouth Town 3–0. After the war, the club won the Senior Cup again in 1951. In 1951–52 the club reached the first round of the FA Cup for the first time and were drawn against Leyton Orient. After a 2–2 draw at Brisbane Road and a 0–0 draw at the Recreation Ground (at which the club's record attendance of 4,473 was set), a second replay was held at Arsenal's Highbury Stadium, resulting in a 5–4 win for Leyton Orient, with Gorleston having been 4–1 down at one point in the match.

In 1952–53 Gorleston won both the league and Senior Cup. In 1955–56 they won the League Cup, beating Tottenham 'A' 2–1 in the final. They reached the first round of the FA Cup again in 1957–58 but lost 10–1 at Gillingham. The late 1950s saw a decline in the club's fortunes; they finished bottom of the league in 1956–57, and after finishing second-from-bottom in 1959–60, financial problems forced them to drop back into the Norfolk & Suffolk League. In 1964 the league merged with the East Anglian League to form the Anglian Combination, with the club placed in Section A. After winning both the Anglian Combination and the Senior Cup in 1968–69, the club returned to the Eastern Counties League.

Gorleston won the Eastern Counties League for a second time in 1972–73. A twelfth Senior Cup victory was achieved in 1977–78, and the club won back-to-back league titles in 1979–80 and 1980–81. In 1982–83 the club won another East Anglian Cup with a victory over Bishop's Stortford. The following year they won the Senior Cup again. In 1988 the Eastern Counties League gained a second division, with Gorleston becoming members of the Premier Division. They were relegated to Division One at the end of the 1993–94 season, but returned to the Premier Division as Division One champions in 1995–96.

Gorleston won the Senior Cup for a fourteenth time in 2000–01 with a 4–0 win over Great Yarmouth Town, before the club was relegated again at the end of the 2004–05 season. In 2010–11 they won the Division One Knockout Cup and the Division One title, earning promotion back to the Premier Division. The club won the Senior Cup in 2011–12, beating Thetford Town 2–0 in the final, and again in 2013–14 (with a 1–0 win over Wroxham) and 2020–21 (beating Mulbarton Wanderers 3–2). In 2021–22 they were Premier Division champions, earning promotion to the North Division of the Isthmian League. The following season saw them win the Senior Cup again with a 3–0 win over Dereham Town.

== Ground ==
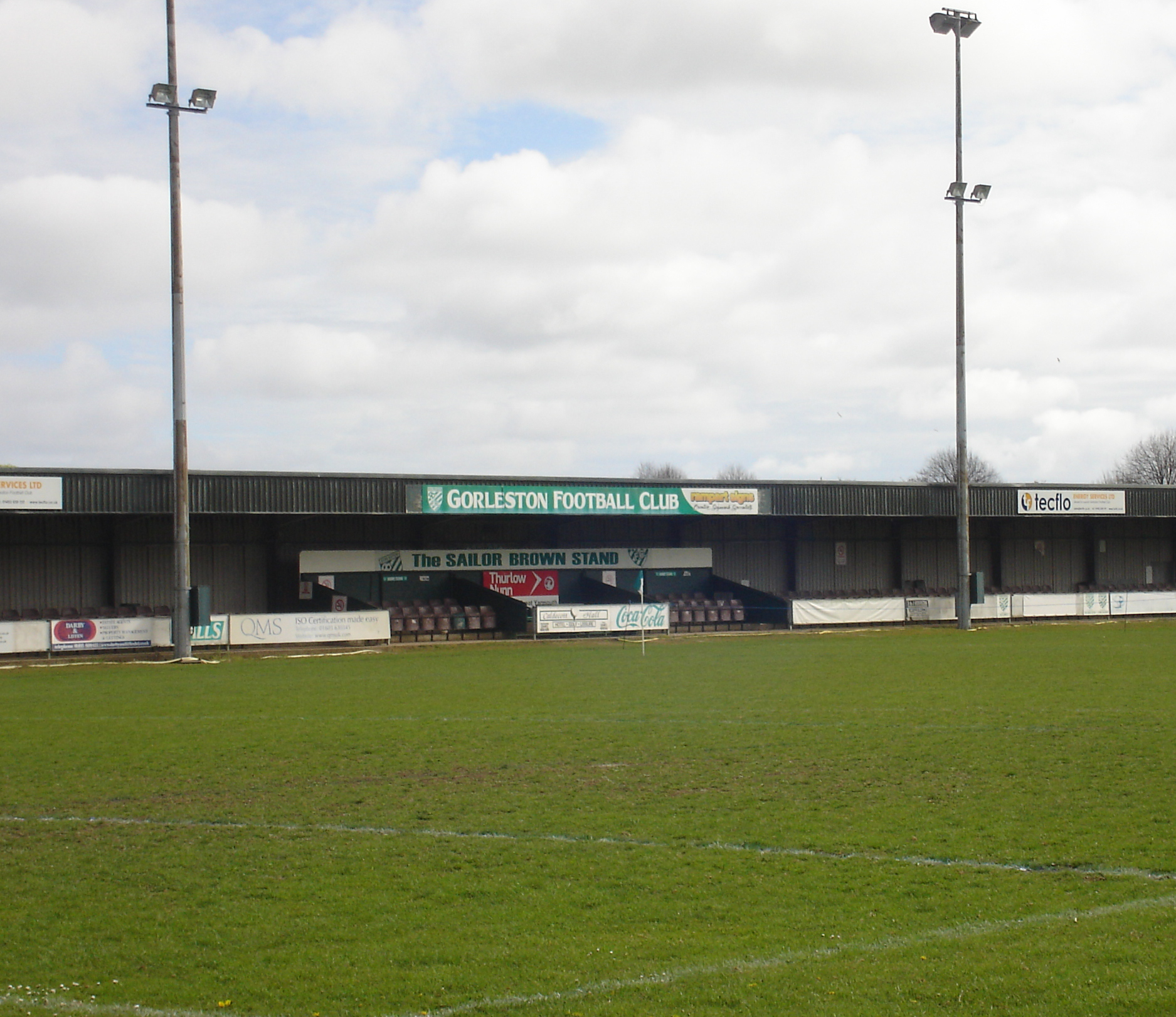
Emerald Park, the club's previous home ground

The club moved to the Recreation Ground in 1889, with the first match at the new ground played on 9 November, a 2–0 win over Yarmouth St Pauls. The record attendance of 4,473 was set in 1951 for an FA Cup first round replay against Orient. In 1982 the club left the Recreation Ground to move to Emerald Park. In November 2019 they announced plans to move to a new ground on the site of East Norfolk Sixth Form College on Church Lane. However, the move was delayed as the college refused to allow the club to open a clubhouse at the new ground.

In July 2022 the club announced an agreement with Lowestoft Town to play their home games at Lowestoft's Crown Meadow ground for the 2022–23 season. On 13 November 2022 Emerald Park was destroyed by an arson attack. Ahead of the 2023–24 season, Gorleston announced a groundshare agreement with rivals Great Yarmouth Town to play at the Wellesley Recreation Ground "for the foreseeable future".

In December 2024 the club announced that they had agreed a deal with Great Yarmouth Borough Council to return to Gorleston Recreation Ground, with the club's youth teams returning with immediate effect.

== Current squad ==
As of 23 June 2025

Note: Flags indicate national team as defined under FIFA eligibility rules; some limited exceptions apply. Players may hold more than one non-FIFA nationality.

Pos.	Nation	Player
GK	ENG	Antoni Bort
GK	ENG	Arthur Darby
DF	ENG	Dion Frary
DF	ENG	Travis Cole
DF	ENG	Joe Jefford
DF	ENG	Lewis Johnson
MF	ENG	Cameron Beazer
MF	ENG	Harley Black
MF	ENG	Dominic Docherty
MF	ENG	Kyle Haylock

Pos.	Nation	Player
MF	ENG	Zach Dronfield
MF	ENG	Mitch McKay
MF	ENG	Joe Marsden
MF	ENG	Louis McIntosh
FW	ENG	Ryan Curtis
FW	ENG	Spencer Keller
FW	ENG	Alby Matthews
FW	ENG	Aaron Bullent
FW	ENG	Luke Johnson

The Isthmian League does not use a squad numbering system.

== Honours ==
- Eastern Counties League
  - Champions 1952–53, 1972–73, 1979–80, 1980–81, 2021–22
  - Division One champions 1995–96, 2010–11
  - League Cup winners 1955–56
  - Division One Knockout Cup winners 2010–11
- East Anglian Cup
  - Winners 1931–32, 1982–83
- Norfolk Senior Cup
  - Winners 1921–22, 1922–23, 1925–26, 1927–28, 1930–31, 1932–33, 1935–36, 1937–38, 1950–51, 1952–53, 1968–69, 1977–78, 1983–84, 2000–01, 2011–12, 2013–14, 2020–21, 2022–23
- Anglian Combination
  - Premier Division Champions 1968–69
- Norfolk & Suffolk League
  - Champions 1920–21, 1925–26, 1929–30, 1931–32, 1932–33, 1933–34, 1934–35
- Norfolk Junior Cup
  - Winners 1906–07
- Yarmouth & District League
  - Champions 1905–06, 1907–08

== Records ==
- Best FA Cup performance: First round, 1951–52, 1957–58
- Best FA Trophy performance: First qualifying round, 1976–77, 1977–78, 2022–23
- Best FA Vase performance: Fifth round, 2002–03
- Record attendance: 4,473 vs Orient, FA Cup first round, 29 November 1951
- Most goals: Eddie Woods, 437

== See also ==
- Gorleston F.C. players
- Gorleston F.C. managers
