= Histon F.C. =

English football club

Coordinates: 52°14′31.39″N 0°06′51.33″E

Histon
- Full name: Histon Football Club
- Nickname: The Stutes
- Founded: 1904
- Ground: Bridge Road, Impington
- Capacity: 3,800 (1,700 seated)
- Chairman: John Hall
- Manager: Mark Critoph and Matt Payne
- League: United Counties League Premier Division South
- 2025–26: United Counties League Premier Division South, 7th of 20
- Website: https://www.histonfc.co.uk/
Home colours	Away colours

Histon Football Club is a football club based in the village of Histon, Cambridgeshire, England. The club are currently members of the United Counties League Premier Division South and play at Bridge Road in Impington. Nicknamed 'the Stutes', originating from the club's previous name Histon Institute, Histon's crest features a rose, the flower representing the rose-covered field given to the people of Histon & Impington in perpetuity for sporting activities in the community by local firm Chivers and Sons.

== History ==
The club was established in 1904 as Histon Institute, the footballing arm of the Histon Institute formed the previous year with help from John Chivers, the chairman of the major employer in Histon & Impington, the Chivers and Sons jam company. The new club joined the Cambridgeshire League, and had reached the top division by the early 1920s. They were Premier Division runners-up in 1935–36. During World War II they played in the East Anglian League for the 1944–45 season, before returning to the Cambridgeshire League after the war and winning the league title in 1945–46.

In 1948 Histon left the Cambridgeshire League to move up to the Spartan League. They were promoted to the league's Premier Division in 1951, and dropped "Institute" from their name the following year. In 1960 the club joined the Delphian League. They finished bottom of the league in 1961–62, and after the league was disbanded at the end of the following season, they joined most other Delphian League clubs in becoming founder members of Division Two of the Athenian League. After finishing bottom of Division Two for two consecutive seasons, the club dropped into the Eastern Counties League.

When the Eastern Counties League gained a second division in 1988, Histon became members of the Premier Division. They won the League Cup in 1990–91, but were relegated to Division One at the end of the 1994–95 season. In 1996–97 the club were Division One runners-up, earning promotion to the Premier Division, starting a run of success that saw them promoted several times. In 1999–2000 they were Premier Division champions and were promoted to the Eastern Division of the Southern League. The 2003–04 saw the club finish as runners-up in the Eastern Division, resulting in promotion to the Premier Division. They also reached the first round of the FA Cup for the first time, losing 3–1 at Woking.

Histon went on to win the Southern League's Premier Division at the first attempt, earning promotion to the Conference South. The 2004–05 season also saw them reach the first round of the FA Cup again, this time defeating League Two club Shrewsbury Town before losing 3–1 at home to Yeovil Town in the second round. In their first season in the Conference South, the club finished fifth, qualifying for the promotion play-offs. After beating Farnborough Town 3–0 in the semi-finals, they lost the final 2–0 to St Albans City. Another FA Cup run saw them defeat Hednesford Town 4–0 in the first round, before losing 2–1 to Nuneaton Borough in the second.

The following season, 2006–07, saw Histon win the Conference South resulting in promotion to the Conference National. In 2008–09 Histon recorded their best-ever FA Cup run; after defeating League One Swindon Town 1–0 in the first round, they were drawn against Leeds United in the second round. The match was shown live on ITV, with Histon winning 1–0 to qualify for the third round, where they lost to Swansea City. In the league, the club finished third in the Conference, entering the play-offs for promotion to the Football League; however, they lost 2–1 on aggregate to Torquay United, losing 2–0 away before winning the home game 1–0.

The 2008–09 season proved to be the high point for Histon as they finished eighteenth the following season and then bottom of the Conference in 2010–11, resulting in relegation to the Conference North. After two seasons of lower-mid table finishes, the club were relegated from the Conference North at the end of the 2013–14 season. Returning to the Southern League Premier Division, they were relegated again in 2015–16, this time to Division One Central. The following season saw the club suffer a second successive relegation, resulting in them returning to the Premier Division of the Eastern Counties League. However, they were promoted to the North Division of the Isthmian League after winning the Eastern Counties League title in 2018–19. At the end of the 2020–21 season they were transferred to Division One Midlands of the Northern Premier League. The 2021–22 season saw Histon finish 18th, subsequently losing the inter-step play-off to Consett and suffering relegation to the Premier Division South of the United Counties League.

=== Reserve team ===
Histon's reserve team reached the Premier Division of the Cambridgeshire League in 1949, a year after the first team had moved up to the Spartan League. However, they finished bottom of the table in their first season in the Premier Division. They then switched to Division One of the South Midlands League. In 1952–53 they finished third, earning promotion to the Premier Division. However, they left the league at the end of the 1954–55 season.

Following the first team's promotion from the Eastern Counties League in 2000, the reserves joined Division One in 2001. They were runners-up in their first season in the division, earning promotion to the Premier Division. After finishing second-from-bottom of the Premier Division in 2010–11, the reserves withdrew from the league. They now play in the Cambridgeshire County League.

== Ground ==
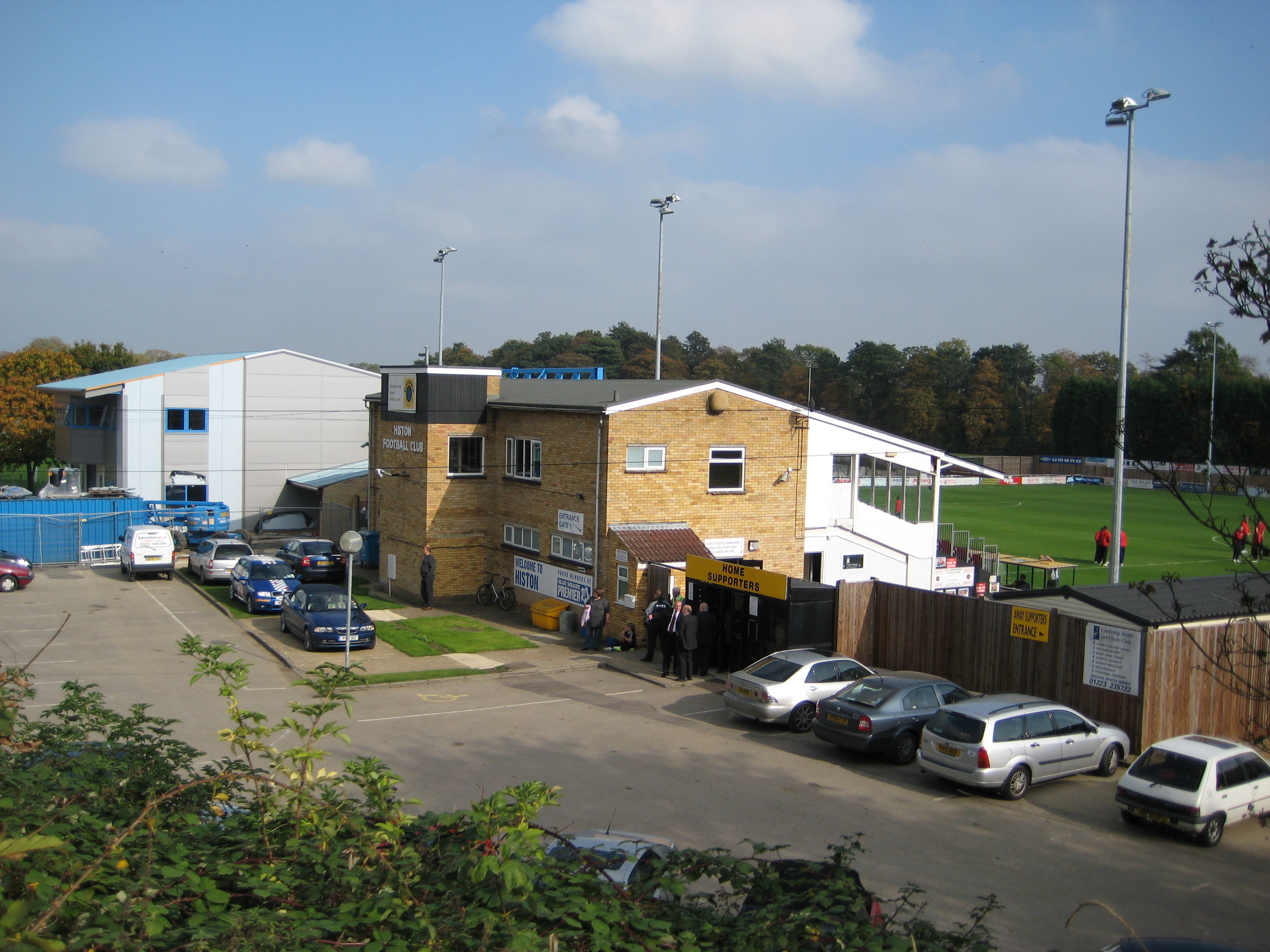
The main stands at Bridge Road

The club have played at Bridge Road since their establishment in 1904.

== Honours ==
- National League
  - National League South champions 2006–07
- Southern League
  - Premier Division champions 2004–05
- Eastern Counties League
  - Premier Division champions 1999–2000, 2018–19
  - League Cup winners 1990–91
- Cambridgeshire League
  - Premier Division champions 1945–46
- Cambridgeshire Professional Cup
  - Winners 2001–02, 2002–03, 2003–04, 2009–10, 2011–12, 2012–13, 2013–14, 2014–15
- Cambridgeshire Invitation Cup
  - Winners 1977–78, 1979–80, 1984–85, 1996–97, 2000–01, 2003–04, 2004–05

== Records ==
- Best FA Cup performance: Third round, 2008–09
- Best FA Trophy performance: Fourth round, 2000–01, 2004–05
- Best FA Vase performance: Fifth round, 2018–19
- Biggest win: 11–0 vs March Town United, Cambridgeshire Invitation Cup, 15 February 2001
- Heaviest defeat: 0–8 vs Ilkeston Town, Northern Premier League Division One Midlands, 2 October 2021
- Record attendance: 6,400 vs King's Lynn, FA Cup, 1956
- Most appearances: Neil Kennedy, 292
- Most goals: Neil Andrews, Neil Kennedy
- Record transfer fee received: £30,000 from Manchester United for Giuliano Maiorana, 1988
- Record transfer fee paid: £6,000 to Chelmsford City for Ian Cambridge, 2000

== See also ==
- Histon F.C. players
- Histon F.C. managers
