= Soham Town Rangers F.C. =

English football club

Coordinates: 52°20′21.84″N 0°19′48.79″E

Soham Town Rangers
- Full name: Soham Town Rangers Football Club
- Nicknames: Greens, Rangers, Town
- Founded: 1947
- Ground: Julius Martin Lane, Soham
- Capacity: 2,000 (250 seated)
- Chairman: Jonathan James
- Manager: Lance Key
- League: Eastern Counties League Premier Division
- 2025–26: Eastern Counties League Premier Division, 4th of 18
Home colours	Away colours

Soham Town Rangers Football Club is a football club based in Soham, Cambridgeshire, England. They are currently members of the Eastern Counties League Premier Division and play at Julius Martin Lane.

== History ==
The club was established in 1947 by a merger of Soham Town and Soham Rangers. Town were formed in 1920, won the Cambridgeshire Junior Cup in 1932–33, and played in the Cambridgeshire League during the 1930s, earning promotion to the Premier Division in 1938. Rangers were formed in 1919 and reached the top division of the Cambridgeshire League in 1926, the same year in which they won the Junior Cup. They went on to win the Cambridgeshire Challenge Cup in 1929–30 and 1934–35.

The merged club started in the Premier Division of the Cambridgeshire League. In 1956 they switched to the Peterborough & District League and two years later won the Challenge Cup. They retained it in 1958–59 and also applied to join the Eastern Counties League, but were unsuccessful. In 1959–60 they won the league for the first time, repeating the feat in 1961–62. In 1963 they applied to join the Eastern Counties League again, and this time were accepted. Discussions were held regarding a merger with local rivals Soham United, but nothing came of the talks.

After the ECL added a second division in 1988, Soham were relegated at the end of the 1988–89 season. In 1990–91 they won the Cambridgeshire Invitation Cup for the first time with a 4–1 win over March Town United. In 1992–93 they finished second in Division One and were promoted back to the Premier Division. They won the Invitation Cup again in 1997–98 and 1998–99. In 2000–01 they won the league's Millenium Trophy and another Invitation Cup was won in 2005–06. In 2007–08 they won their first ECL title after defeating Needham Market 4–0 in a title decider on the last day of the season. Following their victory they were promoted to the Midland Division of the Southern League. At the end of the 2010–11 season they were transferred to Division One North of the Isthmian League. Following the 2020–21 season the club were transferred to Division One Midlands of the Northern Premier League. They finished second-from-bottom of the division in 2021–22 and were relegated back to the Premier Division of the Eastern Counties League.

== Ground ==
The merged club played at Town's Julius Martin Lane, as the Rangers ground was taken over for agriculture. The ground had been home to Soham Town since 1921. The record attendance of 3,000 was set on 18 October 1958 for a Cambridgeshire Invitation Cup match against Pegasus.

== Honours ==
- Eastern Counties League
  - Champions 2007–08
  - Millennium Trophy winners 2000–01
- Peterborough & District League
  - Champions 1959–60, 1961–62
- Cambridgeshire Invitation Cup
  - Winners 1990–91, 1997–98, 1998–99, 2005–06
- Cambridgeshire Challenge Cup
  - Winners 1957–58

== Records ==
- Best FA Cup performance: Third qualifying round, 1970–71
- Best FA Trophy performance: Second Qualifying Round, 2012–13, 2013–14
- Best FA Vase performance: Fifth Round, 2004–05
