= Chatteris Town F.C. =

Association football club in England

Coordinates: 52°26′58.16″N 0°02′20.38″E

Chatteris Town
- Full name: Chatteris Town Football Club
- Nickname: The Lilies
- Founded: 1920
- Ground: West Street, Chatteris
- Capacity: 2,000 (250 seated)
- Chairman: Vicky Bennett
- Manager: Laurence Revell
- League: Cambridgeshire League Division One B
- 2025–26: Peterborough & District League Premier Division (withdrew)

Chatteris Town Football Club is a football club based in Chatteris, Cambridgeshire, England. They are currently members of the Cambridgeshire League Division One B and play at West Street.

== History ==
The club was founded in 1920 as Chatteris Town Juniors, before adopting their current name in 1921. They joined the Isle of Ely League, and after a fast rise through the divisions, they won the league title in 1922–23. In 1924 they joined Division Two of the Cambridgeshire League, and were promoted to Division One at the end of the season as the division was enlarged. In 1928–29 they won Division 1B, but lost a play-off against the Division 1A champions. In 1931–32 they won the Cambridgeshire League and transferred to the Peterborough & District League. In December 1935 financial problems caused them to withdraw from the league. In 1936 they reformed as a junior team, and joined Division 1B of the Cambridgeshire League, winning it at the first attempt.

They also rejoined the Peterborough & District league. They won the league in 1963–64, winning 30 of their 32 matches. The following season they won the title again, this time winning 29 of their 30 matches. A hat-trick of titles was completed in 1965–66, in which they won 27 out of 30 matches. At the end of the season they joined the Eastern Counties League in 1966, and won the League Cup in 1968. The club set its record attendance of 2,000 in a match against local rivals March Town United at the end of the 1988–89 season, a game which March Town United needed to win to clinch the ECL title (and did following a 5–0 win).

When the league added a second tier in 1988, Chatteris were placed in the Premier Division following a 7th-place finish the previous season. The club struggled in the new division, finishing bottom in 1989–90 (a season in which they failed to win a league game) and 1990–91, but were reprieved from relegation as the league lost members who were promoted to the Southern League and Division One clubs failed to meet ground grading criteria. However, the club were eventually relegated in 1995 after finishing bottom and winning just two league games all season.

They continued to play in Division One until 2001, when, despite finishing fifth, they resigned from the league for financial reasons and dropped back into the Peterborough & District League. In 2008 they transferred to Senior Division B the Cambridgeshire League, finishing third in their first season and earning promotion. The following season saw them win the Senior A Division to earn promotion to the Premier Division. They were relegated back to the Senior A Division at the end of the 2012–13 season. In 2015–16 season Chatteris were runners-up in the division, earning promotion back to the Premier Division; they also won three cups, beating Great Shelford 2–1 to win the Cliff Bullen Challenge Cup, Outwell Swifts 1–0 in the William Coad Intermediate Cup and Milton 3–0 to win the William Cockell Memorial Cup.

In 2017–18 Chatteris finished bottom of the Premier Division and were relegated to the Senior A Division. They were runners-up in Senior A the following season and promoted back to the Premier Division. Although the 2020–21 season was abandoned due to the COVID-19 pandemic, the club dropped into Division One B. After finishing third in the division in 2021–22 they were promoted to Senior Division B. At the end of the 2022–23 season the club switched to Division One of the Peterborough & District League. They finished second in Division One in 2023–24 and were promoted to the Premier Division.

=== Other teams ===
The women's team, Chatteris Town Lillies Ladies, was re-established in 2021, joining Division Three of the Cambridgeshire Girls and Women's League. They won Division Three in 2022–23 and were promoted to Division Two.

== Ground ==
The club played at several grounds following its establishment, including New Road, Blackhorse Lane, St Martins Road, Chatteris Park and Chatteris Recreation Ground. In 1932 they moved to West Street, which was used by West Ham United as their base whilst away from London during World War II.

== Honours ==
- Eastern Counties League
  - League Cup winners 1967–68
- Cambridgeshire League
  - Champions 1931–32
  - Senior A Division champions 2009–10
  - Division 1B champions 1928–29, 1936–37
  - William Coad Intermediate Cup winners 2015–16
  - William Cockell Memorial Cup winners 2015–16
- Peterborough & District League
  - Champions 1963–64, 1964–65, 1965–66
- Isle of Ely League
  - Champions 1922–23
- Cambridgeshire Challenge Cup
  - Winners 1951–52, 1954–55, 1962–63, 1963–64, 1964–65, 2015–16

== Records ==
- Record attendance: 2,000 vs March Town United, Eastern Counties League, 12 May 1988
