= Suffolk County Football Association =

Area sporting organization with 19th century origins

Suffolk Football Association
- Purpose: Football Association
- Headquarters: Bill Steward House; The Buntings; Cedars Park
- Location(s): Stowmarket Suffolk IP14 5GZ
- Chief Executive Officer: Andrew Wilesmith
- Website: www.suffolkfa.com

The Suffolk Football Association is the governing body for football in the county of Suffolk, England.

== Football in Suffolk before formation ==
Before the formation of the Suffolk County football Association, the county lacked both a football and a rugby association. However, this is not to say that before 1885 there was no desire for one, for an unsuccessful call for an Eastern Counties Football Association was projected from the Essex Standard in 1881.

Furthermore, on 3 November 1883, a columnist of the Ipswich Journal announced that "An Eastern Counties Football Association is an institution so much needed that if volumes were to be written nothing more conclusive could be said in its favour than it would give a locus standi to the game, which would cause it to be followed with far more vigour than at present."

== History ==
Suffolk FA was formed in 1885 and had eleven founder member clubs, they were, Ipswich Association (now Ipswich Town), Ipswich School, Ipswich Rangers, Cowell's Club (Ipswich), Stowmarket, Bury Town, Bury School, Beccles College, Sudbury Town, Framlingham College and Woodbridge Town

The first President of the Association was The Duke of Hamilton, his presidency ran between 1885 and 1894.

There were 41 registered referees shown in the County handbook for the 1903–1904 season, compared with the figure in today's book of over 400. In the same 1903–1904 handbook there are 100 clubs shown, that were affiliated to the Association, compared with today's figure of over 600.

Key dates in the history of the Association are provided below:

1898 – In 1898 a County Fixture was held against Aston Villa, who at the time were the previous season's F.A. Cup Holders. The gate receipts for this game was £238 5s. 4d. in comparison the Senior Cup Final of 1905 realised gate receipts of £48 12s. 6d.

1907–14 – The period 1907 to 1914 saw the years of "the split" when there were two associations, one affiliated to the F.A. and the other to the A.F.A. In 1914 the F.A. and A.F.A. effected a compromise which resulted in the association being again a harmonious and united body.

1935 – On 20 March 1935 Suffolk County Football Association held its Jubilee celebration, amongst the guests was Stanley Rouse, later to become Sir Stanley. It was reported in the programme for this celebration that over the previous fifty years the progress on interest in the game had been 'wonderful' and that there was hardly a village which did not possess a football club and that practically each town had its own charity competition.

1946 onwards – Again interrupted by war during 1939–1945 the County F.A. started the era after World War II with J.W. Yallop continuing as Hon. Secretary, a post he held since 1919 and would continue to hold until 1960. In addition to J.W. Yallop the county has only had four other Hon. Secretaries since the Second World War, E.A. Brown, B.A.H. Collings, W.M. Steward and Martin Head. E.A. Brown was made a life member of this association in 1980 and its president in 1986.

1985 – A Centenary Banquet was held at Ipswich Moat House on 30 September 1985 to celebrate its 100th birthday. Sir Stanley Rous, C.B.E., Hon. President of FIFA and Hon. Vice-President of the Football Association, proposed the toast to the SCFA.

2000 – The Suffolk County Football Association became a Limited Company in 2000.

2001 – For the first time in its history in April 2001 the County F.A. appointed two full-time employees, namely Will Cook, County Development Officer and James Payne, Clerical Officer, and both gentlemen were installed at the new County FA office at Felaw Maltings in Ipswich.

2003 – In April 2003, the Association moved its headquarters to purpose built offices in Stowmarket; which were officially opened by FA Vice-Chairman Ray Kiddell.

2003 – In July 2003, Martin Head became the first salaried Secretary in the Association's history.

2005 – Suffolk defeated Hampshire 2 – 1 at Portman Road, Ipswich in 2005 to win the FA County Youth Cup. This was actually the county's first ever Cup Final appearance.

2006 – In 2006, all disciplinary administration transferred from volunteers to staff at the Association's HQ.

2007 – Suffolk's 2nd FA County Youth Cup Final appearance was in April 2007. Suffolk drew 1 – 1 with West Riding after extra time at Valley Parade, Bradford. However, West Riding won the match 4 – 3 on penalties.

Today the Association is served by President G.S. Blake (elected in 2001) and Chairman David Porter in addition to the board of Directors, Honorary Officers and the members of Council.

== Governance ==
Football Services is a core function of the County Football Association. This involves the day-to-day running of key areas such as the administration of clubs, leagues and referees along with the running of the discipline process, County Competitions and our representative teams.

The Suffolk FA Football Services Department offers advice on all aspects and all questions no matter how trivial they may seem.

== Affiliated Leagues ==
=== Men's Saturday Leagues ===
- Anglian Combination**
- Suffolk and Ipswich League**
- Essex and Suffolk Border Football League**
- Lowestoft and District League
- St Edmundsbury League**

Footnote: **Part of the English football league system.

=== Youth Leagues ===
- Ipswich and Suffolk Youth League
- South Suffolk Youth League
- Norfolk and Suffolk Youth League
- Suffolk WAYS League

=== Men's Sunday Leagues ===
- Bury and District Sunday Football League
- Ipswich and District Licensed Trades League
- Ipswich Sunday League
- Lowestoft Sunday League
- Sudbury and District Sunday League

=== Ladies and Girls Leagues ===
- Suffolk Girls and Women's League

=== Other Leagues ===
- Norfolk and Suffolk Veterans League

=== Small Sided Leagues ===
- Premier Fives – Chantry, Cornard, Hadleigh, Ipswich, Stowmarket & Sudbury
- Suffolk Sixes – Felixstowe, Haverhill & Bury St Edmunds (Male and Female)
- Champion Soccer – Ipswich
- Raw Soccer – Lowestoft
- Prostar Leagues – Ipswich, Bury St Edmunds & Lowestoft

== Disbanded or Amalgamated Leagues ==
A number of leagues that were affiliated to the Suffolk County FA have disbanded or amalgamated with other leagues including:

- Bury and District League (became the St Edmundsbury League)
- East Anglian League (amalgamated with the Norfolk and Suffolk League in 1964 to become the Anglian Combination)
- Eye and District League
- Felixstowe & District Junior League (now known as the South Suffolk Youth League)
- Ipswich & District League (became the Suffolk and Ipswich League)
- Ipswich and District Sunday Youth League (merged with the Suffolk and Essex Youth Combination to become the Ipswich and Suffolk Youth League)
- Ipswich Boys Combination (became the Ipswich & District Sunday Youth League)
- Norfolk and Suffolk League (amalgamated with the East Anglian League in 1964 to become the Anglian Combination)
- North Suffolk League
- Stowmarket and District League
- Suffolk and Essex Youth Combination (merged with the Ipswich and District Sunday Youth League to become the Ipswich and Suffolk Youth League)
- Waveney Youth League
- West Suffolk Football League

== Affiliated Member Clubs ==
Among the notable clubs that are (or were at one time) affiliated to the Suffolk County FA are:

- AFC Sudbury (merger of Sudbury Town and Sudbury Wanderers)
- Achilles
- Beccles Town
- Brantham Athletic (formerly Brantham & Stutton United)
- Bungay Town
- Bury Town
- Cornard United
- Crane Sports
- Debenham Leisure Centre
- Felixstowe & Walton United (merger of Felixstowe Town and Walton United)
- Framlingham Town
- Haverhill Rovers
- Hadleigh United
- Ipswich Wanderers
- Ipswich Town
- Kirkley & Pakefield
- Leiston
- Long Melford
- Lowestoft Town
- Mildenhall Town
- Needham Market
- Newmarket Town
- Ransomes Sports (formerly Orwell Works and RSSC Ransomes)
- Stowmarket Town
- Sudbury Town (merged with Sudbury Wanderers to form AFC Sudbury)
- Sudbury Wanderers (merged with Sudbury Town to form AFC Sudbury)
- Team Bury
- Walsham-le-Willows
- Whitton United
- Woodbridge Town

== County Cup Competitions ==
The Suffolk County FA run the following Cup Competitions:

- Suffolk FA Premier Cup
- Suffolk FA Senior Cup
- Suffolk FA Senior Reserve Cup
- Suffolk FA Junior Cup
- Suffolk FA Primary Cup
- Suffolk FA Sunday Cup
- Suffolk FA Sunday Shield
- Suffolk FA Sunday Trophy
- Suffolk FA Veterans Cup
- Suffolk FA Women's Cup
- Suffolk FA Boys U15 Minor Cup
- Tesco Suffolk FA Boys U13 Cup
- Tesco Suffolk FA Girls U16 Cup
- Tesco Suffolk FA Girls U14 Cup
- Ipswich Inter-Firm Cup

== Suffolk Premier Cup ==
The Suffolk Premier Cup is a county cup competition involving senior teams affiliated to the Suffolk County Football Association.

== Suffolk Senior Cup ==
The Suffolk Senior Cup is a county cup competition involving senior teams affiliated to the Suffolk County Football Association.

== List of Suffolk Junior Cup Winners ==
Year	Suffolk Junior Cup Winners
1889–90	Ipswich Town Reserves
1890–91	Halesworth
1891–92	Bungay Chaucer Press
1892–93	Landguard Ford
1893–94	Kirkley
1894–95	Leiston
1895–96	Beccles Red Star
1896–97	Woodbridge Old St Mary's
1897–98	Kirkley Reserves
1898–99	Brantham Athletic / Lowestoft Reserves
1899–1900	Mildenhall
1900–01	Lowestoft Town Reserves
1901–02	Haverhill Rovers Reserves
1902–03	Lowestoft I.O.G.T.
1903–04	Southwold
1904–05	Orwell Works
1905–06	Halesworth Town
1906–07	Ipswich Town Reserves
1907–08	Stowmarket
1908–09	Woodbridge
1909–10	Orford
1910–11	Sudbury Brigade Utd.
1911–12	All Saints United (Ipswich)
1912–13	
1913–14	Stoke Athletic
1914–20	No competition due to World War I
1920–21	St. Mary Elms Old Boys (Ipswich)
1921–22	Egerton Amateurs

Year	Suffolk Junior Cup Winners
1922–23	Lowestoft Town Reserves
1923–24	Halesworth Town
1924–25	Leiston St. Margarets
1925–26	Woodbridge Town
1926–27	Newmarket Town Reserves
1927–28	Brantham Athletic Reserves
1928–29	United Services (Lowestoft)
1929–30	Old Nactonians
1930–31	Exning United
1931–32	Melton St. Andrew's
1932–33	Kirkley Reserves
1933–34	Eastern Counties United Reserves
1934–35	Eastern Counties United Reserves
1935–36	Eastern Counties United Reserves
1936–37	Lakenheath
1937–38	Mildenhall R.A.F.
1938–39	Beccles Town
1939–45	No competition due to World War II
1945–46	Brooke Marine
1946–47	Lowestoft Town Reserves
1947–48	Lowestoft Town Reserves
1948–49	Leiston St. Margarets
1949–50	Lowestoft Town Reserves
1950–51	Bury East Athletic
1951–52	Town Street, Brandon
1952–53	Landseer Youth Club
1953–54	Lowestoft C.W.S.
1954–55	Brandon Town

Year	Suffolk Junior Cup Winners
1955–56	Grundisburgh
1956–57	Beccles Caxton
1957–58	Beccles Caxton
1958–59	Beaconsfield
1959–60	Castle Hill Youth Club
1960–61	Southwold Town
1961–62 Honington School
1962–63	Oulton Broad
1963–64	Finningham
1964–65	Finningham
1965–66	Finningham
1966–67	Brandon Town
1967–68	Finningham
1968–69	Finningham
1969–70	Old Lowestoftians
1970–71	Woodbridge Town
1971–72	Lake Lothing
1972–73	St. Edmunds R.C.Y.C.
1973–74	Murrayside
1974–75	Lakenheath
1975–76	Alan Road
1976–77	St. Edmunds R.C.Y.C.
1977–78	St. Edmunds R.C.Y.C.
1978–79	Murrayside
1979–80	St. Edmunds R.C.Y.C.
1980–81	Brandon Town
1981–82	Post Office Research
1982–83	Leiston

Year	Suffolk Junior Cup Winners
1983–84	Leiston
1984–85	Needham Market
1985–86	Ashlea
1986–87	Woodbridge Town
1987–88	Walsham-le-Willows
1988–89	Walsham-le-Willows
1989–90	Walsham-le-Willows
1990–91	Saxmundham Sports
1991–92	Newbury United
1992–93	Newbury United
1993–94	Stanton
1994–95	Wenhaston United
1995–96	Haughley United Reserves
1996–97	Cavendish
1997–98	Tuddenham Rovers
1998–99	Tuddenham Rovers
1999–2000	Tuddenham Rovers
2000–01	Bramford United
2001–02	Westerfield United
2002–03	Cockfield United
2003–04	Hearts of Oak
2004–05	Leiston St Margarets
2005–06	AFC Sudbury Reserves
2006–07	Stonham Aspal
2007–08	Old Newton United
2008–09	Achilles
2009–10	Bacton United 89
2010–11	Glemsford & Cavendish United

Year	Suffolk Junior Cup Winners
2011–12	????
2012–13	Oulton Broad
2013–14	Coplestonians
2014–15	Ipswich Athletic

== List of Suffolk Primary Cup Winners ==
Year	Suffolk Primary Cup Winners
1933–34	Stoke Comrades
1934–35	Priory Works / Eastern Counties III
1935–36	Eastern Counties III
1936–37	Newton Green
1937–38	Bury St. Andrews
1938–39	Whitton United
1939–46	No competition due to World War II
1946–47	Rattlesden
1947–48	Stanton
1948–49	Wortham
1949–50	Eriswell
1950–51	Exning Reserves
1951–52	Woolpit
1952–53	Wickham Market
1953–54	Lowestoft Electrical Apparatus
1954–55	Benhall St. Mary's
1955–56	Christchurch
1956–57	Beaconsfield

Year	Suffolk Primary Cup Winners
1957–58	Elmswell
1958–59	Priory Heath Y.C.
1959–60	Richards Ironworks
1960–61	Fomham & Hengrave
1961–62	Fomham St. Martin
1962–63	Bildeston Rangers
1963–64	Ixworth
1964–65	Bildeston Rangers
1965–66	Barrow
1966–67	Westgate Brewery
1967–68	Woodbridge Athletic
1968–69	St. Edmunds R.C.Y.C.
1969–70	Lake Lothing
1970–71	Tattingstone United
1971–72	Haughley Youth
1972–73	Murrayside
1973–74	Springfield
1974–75	Wickham Market

Year	Suffolk Primary Cup Winners
1975–76	Caribbean
1976–77	Bildeston Rangers
1977–78	South Suffolk Old Boys
1978–79	Bildeston Rangers
1979–80	Waveney Wanderers
1980–81	Covenanters
1981–82	Halesworth Town Reserves
1982–83	Waveney Wanderers
1983–84	Smock
1984–85	Cavendish
1985–86	Hundon
1986–87	Thomas Eldred
1987–88	Kesgrave Bell
1988–89	East Anglian Customs
1989–90	Cue Plas
1990–91	Tacket Street Boys Brigade OB
1991–92	Lakenheath Reserves
1992–93	Lakenheath Reserves

Year	Suffolk Primary Cup Winners
1993–94	Ixworth
1994–95	Murray Rangers
1995–96	Rushmere Athletic
1996–97	Orwell Athletic
1997–98	Bucklesham
1998–99	Bacton United
1999–2000	Saracens
2000–01	Martlesham Athletic 98
2001–02	AFC Hoxne
2002–03	Bury Town 95 Reserves
2003–04	Coplestonians Reserves
2004–05	Needham Market "A"
2005–06	Newmarket White Lion
2006–07	Stowmarket Stag
2007–08	Bungay Town Reserves
2008–09	Redgrave Rangers
2009–10	Somersham
2010–11	Benhall St Mary
2011–12	Cedars Park

== List of other Suffolk Cup Competition Winners ==
Season	Suffolk Sunday Cup	Suffolk Sunday Shield	Suffolk Sunday Trophy	Suffolk U15 Minor Cup	Norfolk/Suffolk Women's Cup	Suffolk Veterans Cup
1998–99	St. Clements	Leiston Athletic	Horringer S.C.	Sicklesmere United	HP Needham Market Ladies	
1999–2000	AFC Railway	Dickerson	Chantry Grasshoppers	St. Johns Youth	City Racers	
2000–01	Great Eastern	Strabroke Exiles	Waveney Gunners	St. Johns Youth	Stowmarket Ladies	
2001–02	Notleys 1882	Bartram Beccles	Harrod UK	St. Johns Youth	Stowmarket Ladies	
2002–03	Carlton Red House	Stowmarket Eclipse	Jane Walker	Woodbridge Town Youth	Stowmarket Sophlogic	
2003–04	Bardwell Wasps	Exning United	Stow Excelsior	Trimley Red Devils	Stowmarket Sophlogic	
2004–05	Notleys 1882	Stow Excelsior	Oak Tavern	Moreton Hall Youth	Sophtlogic Ladies	
2005–06	Tudor Rose	Kelsale Social Club	Rougham Lions	Stowmarket Town Youth	Ipswich Town Women	
2006–07	Bardwell Wasps	Exning United	Athletic Morton Hall	Cornard Dynamos	Norwich City Ladies	
2007–08	Bardwell Wasps	Capel Plough	Red Herring	Cornard United Youth	Ipswich Town Women	
2008–09	Wortham Dolphin United	Atec	Rickinghall	East Bergholt United Juniors	Norwich City Ladies	Kirkley & Pakefield Veterans
2009–10	Mount Pleasant			Ransomes Sports		
2010–11	Ipswich Thistle	Chantry Blues	Sorrel Horse	Grundisburgh Youth	Ipswich Town Women	Stowupland Falcons Veterans
2011-12	Redgrave Rangers					
2012-13	Gym United					
2013-14	Gym United					
2014-15	Tostock Pirates					
2015-16	AFC Chelmondiston					

== Directors & Officials ==
=== Board of directors ===
- David Sheepshanks (President)
- Phil Lawler - (Chairman)
- Andrew Wilesmith - (Chief Executive Officer)
- Julie Mulcahy - (Senior Independent Director)
- Bruce Babcock - (Vice Chair and Non-Executive Director)
- Eddie May - (Non-Executive Director)
- Nigel Johnson - (Non-Executive Director)
- Neil Sharp - (Non-Executive Director)
- Robert Peace - (Non-Executive Director)

=== Key Officials ===
- Andrew Wilesmith (Chief Executive)
- Matt Stebbings (Football Development Manager)
- Hayley Chart (Football Services Manager)
- Ben Bowles (Workforce Development Manager)
- Julie Cole (Finance and Administration Manager)
