= 1976–77 Eastern Counties Football League =

The 1976–77 Eastern Counties Football League was the 35th season in the history of the Eastern Counties Football League.

Three new clubs joined the league this season:

- Bury Town, transferred from the Southern Football League.
- Colchester United reserves,
- Felixstowe Town, joined from the Essex and Suffolk Border League.

Wisbech Town won the league, securing their second Eastern Counties Football League title.

== League table ==
Eastern Counties Football League
- Season: 1976–77
- Champions: Wisbech Town
- Matches played: 420
- Goals scored: 1,237 (2.95 per match)

Pos	Team	Pld	HW	AW	D	L	GF	GA	GAv	Pts
1	Wisbech Town (C)	40	15	11	11	3	79	30	2.633	137
2	Sudbury Town	40	13	10	9	8	75	36	2.083	120
3	Gorleston	40	12	10	7	11	80	53	1.509	112
4	Saffron Walden Town	40	13	7	11	9	65	49	1.327	109
5	Great Yarmouth Town	40	9	9	13	9	67	45	1.489	107
6	Lowestoft Town	40	11	8	9	12	64	45	1.422	102
7	Thetford Town	40	12	6	8	14	76	64	1.188	94
8	Ely City	40	10	7	9	14	57	46	1.239	93
9	Histon	40	11	5	11	13	59	54	1.093	91
10	Haverhill Rovers	40	8	4	15	13	46	49	0.939	82
11	Stowmarket	40	8	5	12	15	51	54	0.944	81
12	Clacton Town	40	10	4	10	16	58	66	0.879	80
13	Colchester United reserves	40	8	6	8	18	57	59	0.966	78
14	Braintree & Crittall	40	9	4	11	16	53	64	0.828	78
15	Newmarket Town	40	7	6	9	18	44	60	0.733	76
16	Soham Town Rangers	40	8	3	12	17	62	73	0.849	71
17	Bury Town	40	9	2	12	17	48	55	0.873	70
18	Gothic	40	6	4	8	22	53	79	0.671	60
19	Felixstowe Town	40	7	2	9	22	42	76	0.553	56
20	Chatteris Town	40	5	4	6	25	61	103	0.592	52
21	March Town United	40	7	0	10	23	40	77	0.519	48

Source: Non League Matters
Rules for classification: 1) Points; 2) Goal average; 3) Goals scored
(C) Champion
