= Stowmarket Town F.C. =

Association football club in England

Coordinates: 52°11′47.74″N 0°59′33.55″E

Stowmarket Town
- Full name: Stowmarket Town Football Club
- Nicknames: The Old Gold & Blacks
- Founded: 1883
- Ground: Greens Meadow, Stowmarket
- Chairman: Jeff Letter
- Manager: David Lorimer
- League: Eastern Counties League Premier Division
- 2024–25: Eastern Counties League Premier Division, 16th of 20
- Website: http://www.stowmarkettownfc.co.uk
Home colours	Away colours

Stowmarket Town Football Club is a football club based in Stowmarket, Suffolk, England. The club are currently members of the Eastern Counties League Premier Division and play at Greens Meadow.

== History ==
The club was founded as Stowmarket Association F.C. in 1883 by a merger of Stowmarket St Peter and Stowmarket Ironworks. Originally playing at the Cricket Meadow, their first match was against Needham Market School. The club were founder members of the Suffolk County Football Association in 1885. By the late 1800s the club had dropped the word "Association" from its name, which had originally been used to distinguish it from the local rugby club.

They joined the newly formed Ipswich & District League in 1896, and won the title in its first two seasons and again in 1899–1900. In 1907 they won the Suffolk Junior Cup, beating Westbourne Mills 5–1, and in 1909–10 the club won the league again, with the reserve team winning the second division. They won the title again in 1921–22, before transferring to the Essex & Suffolk Border League in 1925. In 1931 the club won the Suffolk Senior Cup for the first time, beating Sudbury Town 3–1. They won it for a second time in 1933, beating Kirkley 5–2, and again the following season, with a 3–0 win over Bury Town.

At the end of the 1936–37 season the club disbanded due financial difficulties. After World War II local club Stowupland Corinthians began playing at the Cricket Meadows, and joined the Border League in 1946. In the summer of 1947 the club's name was changed to Stowmarket Corinthians, and in August it was changed again to Stowmarket Town. After legal advice, it was changed for a third time, to Stowmarket F.C. Under the management of player-coach Jackie Little, The club won the Border League, the League Cup and the Suffolk Senior Cup in 1950–51, beating Sudbury Town 2–0 in front of 10,867 supporters in the final of the latter. The League Cup and the Senior Cup were won again in 1951–52, and at the end of the season the club joined the Eastern Counties League.

In 1957–58 they won the Senior Cup again, beating Newmarket Town 2–0. They won the trophy for a sixth time in 1961–62, beating Brantham Athletic 2–0. The following year they entered the Suffolk Premier Cup and won it, beating Lowestoft Town 3–0. A seventh success in the Senior Cup was achieved in 1965 with a 4–0 win over Orwell Works, and the Premier Cup was won again in 1977 with a 2–1 win over Sudbury Town after the original two-legged tie had ended level.

In 1983 they were renamed Stowmarket Town, and a year later moved to Greens Meadow. The club won the Premier Cup again in 1986, beating Lowestoft 1–0, and in 1991, when Haverhill Rovers were beaten 3–2 after extra time. At the end of the 2004–05 season the club were relegated for the first time in their history, dropping into Division One, where they have remained since. After a hiatus of over forty years, the club won the Senior Cup again in 2006–07, beating Grundisburgh 2–1. In 2016–17 season they were Division One champions and were promoted back to the Premier Division. In 2019–20 the club were unbeaten 28 games into the league season, but the league was abandoned due to the coronavirus pandemic. At the end of the 2020–21 season, which was also curtailed due to the pandemic, they were promoted to the North Division of the Isthmian League.

In 2023–24 Stowmarket finished bottom of the North Division and were relegated back to the Premier Division of the Eastern Counties League.

== Honours ==
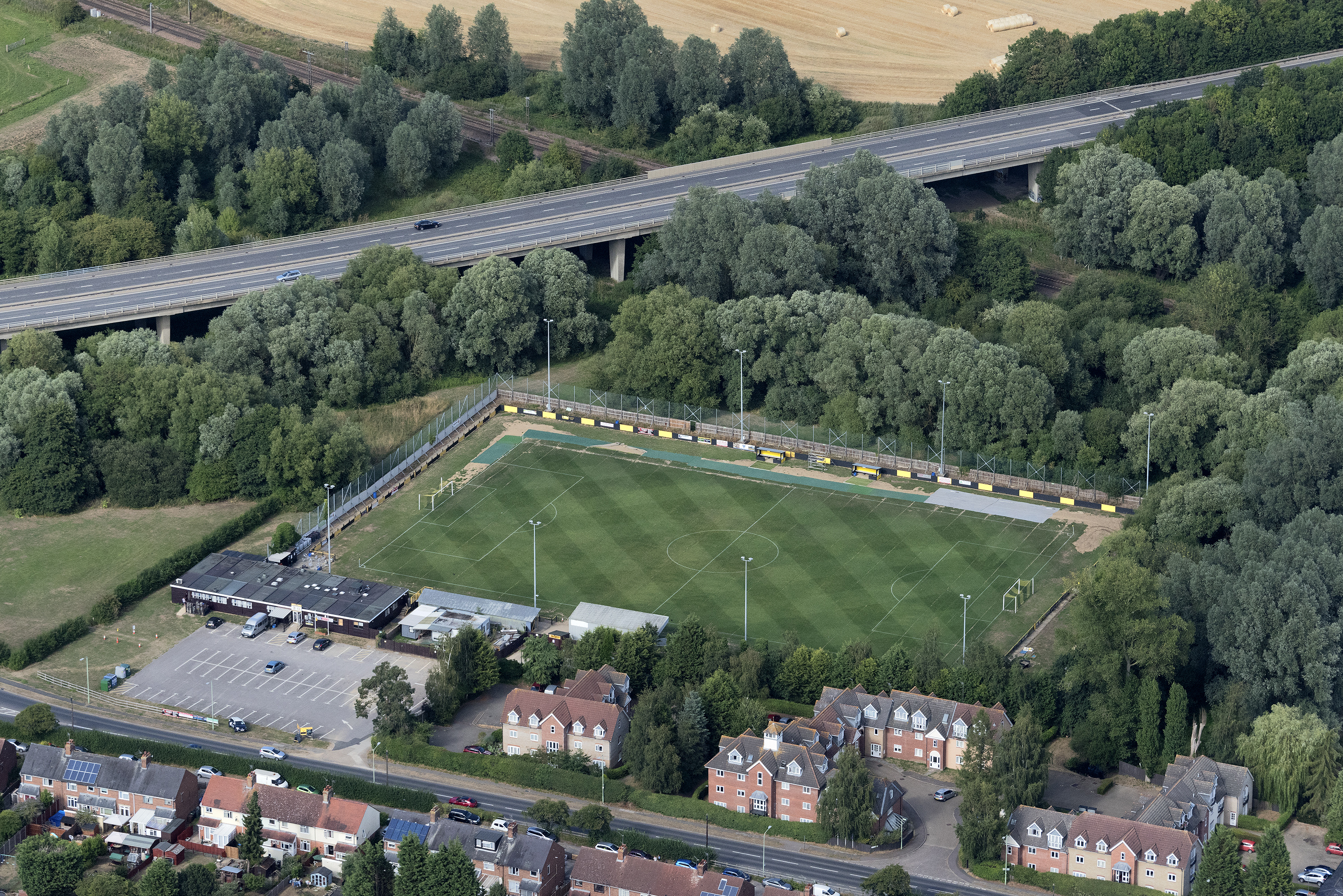
Greens Meadow

- Eastern Counties League
  - Division One champions 2016–17
- Suffolk & Ipswich League
  - Champions 1896–97, 1897–98, 1899–1900, 1909–10, 1921–22
  - Division Two champions 1909–10 (reserves)
- Essex & Suffolk Border League
  - Champions 1950–51
  - League Cup winners 1950–51, 1951–52, 1970–71, 1991–92, 1994–95
- Suffolk Premier Cup
  - Winners 1962–63, 1976–77, 1985–86, 1990–91
- Suffolk Senior Cup
  - Winners 1930–31, 1932–33, 1933–34, 1950–51, 1957–58, 1961–62, 1964–65, 2006–07
- Suffolk Junior Cup
  - Winners 1907

== Records ==
- Biggest win: 13–0 at Cornard United, Eastern Counties League Division One, 11 December 2010
- Record attendance
  - 3,338 vs Romford in the FA Amateur Cup, 1951–52 (at Cricket Meadow)
  - 1,200 vs Ipswich Town XI in a friendly match, 1994–95 (at Greens Meadow)
