= Whitton United F.C. =

Association football club in England

Coordinates: 52°04′55.85″N 1°07′17.77″E

Whitton United
- Full name: Whitton United Football Club
- Nicknames: The Boyos, The Greens
- Founded: 1926
- Ground: King George V Playing Fields, Ipswich
- Capacity: 1,000
- Chairman: Ruel Fox
- Manager: Shane Coldron
- League: Suffolk & Ipswich League Premier Division
- 2024–25: Eastern Counties League Division One North, 14th of 20 (resigned)
Home colours	Away colours

Whitton United Football Club is a football club based in the Whitton area of Ipswich, Suffolk, England. Affiliated to the Suffolk County FA, they are currently members of the Suffolk & Ipswich League Premier Division and play at the King George V Playing Fields.

== History ==
Although a Whitton United existed in the late 19th century, the modern club was established in 1926 and initially played on a pitch behind the Whitton Crown pub. They won the Suffolk Minor Cup 2–0 in their first season. After two seasons they moved to another ground behind the Whitton Maypole pub, and later to the King George V Playing Fields.

The club won the Senior Division of the Ipswich & District League in 1946–47 and again in 1947–48, when they also reached the final of the Suffolk Senior Cup, but lost the final at Portman Road 3–1 to Lowestoft Town in front of over 8,000 supporters. In 1959 they won the cup, beating Bungay Town 3–0, and retained it the following season, again beating Bungay 3–0.

They won the Senior Division again in 1965–66 and 1967–68, but then switched to the Essex & Suffolk Border League. After struggling during the 1970s, they were relegated and dropped into Division Two of the Ipswich & District League. In the late 1980s and early 1990s the club won Division Two and Division One to return to the Senior Division. In 1992 they won the Suffolk Senior Cup for a third time, beating Long Melford 2–0, and the following season won the Senior Division. After winning it again in 1994–95 the club were promoted to Division One of the Eastern Counties League.

Former Plymouth player Ronnie Mauge joined the club as manager in 2005, but resigned in 2007. In 2007–08 they finished third in the league and were promoted to the Premier Division. However, in early January 2009 the club that they would be unable to fulfil their first team fixtures and would be withdrawing from the league. Despite their withdrawal, the club rejoined the league in Division One the following season, with Ian Brown appointed manager. In 2010–11 they won the Senior Cup again, defeating Lakenheath 1–0 in the final. They also finished second in the league, but were not promoted due to ground grading issues. The following season the club retained the Senior Cup with a 2–1 win over Long Melford. In 2013–14 they were promoted to the Premier Division after winning the Division One title. However, they were relegated back to Division One after finishing bottom of the division in 2015–16.

== Honours ==
- Eastern Counties League
  - Division One Champions 2013–14
- Suffolk & Ipswich League
  - Senior Division champions 1946–47, 1947–48, 1965–66, 1967–68, 1992–93, 1994–95
  - League Cup winners 1994
- Suffolk Senior Cup
  - Winners 1959, 1960, 1992, 2011, 2012

== Club records ==
- Highest league position: 11th in Eastern Counties League Premier Division, 2014–15
- Best FA Cup performance: Second qualifying round, 1951–52, 1953–54, 1957–58, 1958–59
- Best FA Vase performance: Second round, 2010–11, 2011–12
- Attendance: 528 vs Ipswich Town, 29 November 1995

== Notable former players ==
Former professional footballers who have played for Whitton include:

- Ian Brown (2005–2007)
- Ronnie Mauge (2004–2006)
