= Reg Tricker =

English footballer

Personal information
- Full name: Reginald William Tricker
- Date of birth: 5 October 1904
- Place of birth: Karachi, British India
- Date of death: Registered June 1990 (aged 85)
- Height: 5 ft 11 in (1.80 m)
- Position: Inside forward

Senior career*
| Years | Team | Apps | (Gls) |
- Beccles Town
- Alexandra Park
| 1924–1925 | Luton Town | 4 | (0) |
- Beccles Town
| 1925–1927 | Charlton Athletic | 41 | (17) |
| 1927–1929 | Arsenal | 12 | (5) |
| 1929–1933 | Clapton Orient | 131 | (60) |
| 1933–1935 | Margate | | |
| 1935 | Ramsgate | | |
| 1936–1938 | Sittingbourne | | |
| 1938–1939 | Ashford | | |
- * Club domestic league appearances and goals

Reginald William Tricker (5 October 1904 – 1990) was an English footballer who played as an Inside forward. He made 188 appearances scoring 82 goals in the Football League for Luton Town, Charlton Athletic, Arsenal and Clapton Orient.

== Playing career ==
Though born in Karachi, then part of British India, now in Pakistan, Tricker's family moved back to England in 1908 when he was four and he grew up in Suffolk. He started his career at non-league club Beccles Town who played in the Norfolk & Suffolk League. In 1924 he moved to London to study to become a schoolteacher and joined Luton Town as an amateur player. He made his debut for "The Hatters" in a Third Division South match on Christmas Day in 1924 and made a further three league appearances before leaving Luton at the season's end.

In autumn 1925 Tricker was selected for both the Suffolk County and the Amateur Football Association representative teams – the latter was one of several selections by the Association. For the 1925–26 season he joined Third Division South club Charlton Athletic as an amateur player. He made his league debut for the club in the first match of the season on 29 August 1925 against Bristol Rovers and scored his first league goal two weeks later on 12 September 1925, the only strike in a 1–0 victory over Exeter City. Tricker re-joined "The Addicks" for the following campaign initially as an amateur player but in February 1927, shortly before being transferred-out, he signed as a professional player. In his time with Charlton he had played in 41 league matches scoring 17 goals.

Tricker moved to Arsenal of the First Division in March 1927 for a reputed £2,250 fee and made his debut on 19 March 1927 against Everton. Tricker soon established himself at the club, with two goals in his fourth game for the club, in a North London derby match against Tottenham Hotspur on 7 May 1927. However, he was not part of the side that lost the 1927 FA Cup Final against Cardiff City as he was cup-tied. Despite his early success Tricker was one of many forwards at the club and failed to hold-down a first team place during either the subsequent 1927–28 or 1928–29 seasons, making just eight appearances in total over the two seasons. In February 1929 having scored five goals in his 12 appearances for "The Gunners" he was transferred to Clapton Orient.

"Orient", who at the time were a Second Division club, paid a fee of £1,000 for Tricker who, in addition to being a footballer, was reported as being a North London schoolmaster. His first match for Orient was on 9 February 1929 however at the conclusion of his first part-season with "The Os" they were relegated to the Third Division South. Playing in the latter division, he scored the first of his sixty goals for the club on 28 September 1928 against Watford. In each of the three full seasons he was with the club, between 1930–31 and 1932–33, Tricker was the club's top scorer. At the end of the latter season the club was under suspension and Tricker was placed on their 'open for transfer' list.

Clapton reconstructed their team without Tricker and he was not signed by another League club, but in late October 1933 he signed for Margate who had just joined the Southern League's nine-team strong Eastern Section; the team additionally played in the Kent League. Playing in the latter league on 28 October 1933 he scored in his debut match for the club against Northfleet United, the first of 17 league and cup goals he scored during the campaign. In his subsequent second season with Margate, now buoyed by a nursery agreement with Arsenal, they played in both the Eastern Section and newly instigated supplementary competition the Central Section of the Southern League and Tricker was top scorer for the club in both sections – he was also second highest scorer for the reserve team playing in the Kent League. His season haul of forty goals in all competitions included five in a single Southern League Eastern Section match on 22 April 1935 against Tunbridge Wells Rangers.

Tricker signed with Margate's near neighbours Ramsgate for their 1935–36 Kent League campaign. Playing against Tunbridge Wells Rangers on 19 October 1935, in a game in which he had scored a hat-trick, in the final few minutes he was involved in a collision and suffered a double fracture to his left arm. Although he did not play again for "The Rams" for the remainder of the season he was the team's top scorer for the season with thirteen goals. Over a year after the accident in December 1936 Tricker returned to playing Kent League football when he signed with Sittingbourne – his first match back on 12 December 1936, in which he scored, was ironically against Tunbridge Wells Rangers. He was regularly on the score-sheet, notching 17 goals in his first three months with the team and subsequently re-signed for the following 1937–38 season, in which he scored 20 league goals.

In the summer of 1938 Tricker made a move to Sittingbourne's Kent League rivals Ashford. He scored on his club debut on the first day of the 1938–39 season, 27 August 1938, against Canterbury Waverley (a rebound from a penalty he had taken). By 22 April 1939, a few weeks prior to the season's end, Tricker had netted 42 league and cup goals, and he subsequently added two further crucial goals to that total: firstly, the equalising goal in the first tie of the Kent League Cup Final on 27 April 1939 against Bexleyheath & Welling (who at the time were a nursery club for Charlton Athletic); secondly, in the replay at Ashford nine days later he notched the only goal in the 1–0 victory, winning the trophy for Ashford and subsequently, for himself, a miniature trophy presented by the club to the players. Tricker re-signed for the following season with Ashford but early in September 1939 the league competition was halted owing to World War II and this curtailed his senior-level club career.

== Personal life ==
Tricker was a county athletics champion for two years in 1925 and 1926, winning the Suffolk and Norfolk County A.A.A. 120 yards hurdles title. He was studying to become a schoolmaster at the Borough Road Training College for Teachers whilst with Luton and during his time at Charlton he had finished his studies and had taken-up his first scholastic appointment. Tricker continued in the teaching profession during his footballing career and later became a Head of PE at Owen's School, Islington.

Tricker's death was registered in June 1990 at Hendon.
