= Andrew Cave-Brown =

Scottish footballer (born 1988)

Personal information
- Full name: Andrew Robert Cave-Brown
- Date of birth: 5 August 1988 (age 38)
- Place of birth: Gravesend, England
- Height: 5 ft 10 in (1.78 m)
- Positions: Defender; midfielder

Team information
- Current team: Lowestoft Town

Senior career*
Years	Team	Apps	(Gls)
2006–2008	Norwich City	0	(0)
2006–2007	→ King's Lynn (loan)	8	(1)
2008–2010	Leyton Orient	29	(0)
2010–2012	Lowestoft Town	45	(3)
2012–	Beccles Town	11	(3)

International career
2007	Scotland U19	2	(0)
2007	Scotland U20	3	(0)
- * Club domestic league appearances and goals as of 16 April 2013

Andrew Robert Cave-Brown (born 5 August 1988) is a Scottish footballer, who plays on a part-time basis for Beccles Town. Cave-Brown is predominantly a right sided full-back, who has been capped for Scotland at under-20 Level, for whom he played in the World Cup in 2007. He attended schools in Kent, first Whitehill Primary Schools and later Gravesend Grammar School.

== Career ==
=== Norwich City and Scotland ===
Cave-Brown had been on the books of Charlton Athletic but joined on a scholarship at Norwich City for the 2004–05 season. He made his full Norwich debut in the dying moments of the FA Cup third round defeat against West Ham United in January 2006, and made his first start in the League Cup victory over Torquay United in August 2006, although he was stretchered off after half an hour with a leg injury. He signed a professional contract in April 2006.

Cave-Brown was called up to the Scotland Under-19 squad in August 2005 and he played all qualifying games for the Scottish Under-19 side that reached the final of the 2006 European Under-19 Championship.

Cave-Brown signed for King's Lynn on loan in December 2006, following the appointment of Keith Webb, the ex-Norwich City reserve team manager, as King's Lynn's new first team manager. He returned to Norwich in February 2007.

In the summer of 2007, he represented Scotland in the 2007 FIFA U-20 World Cup in Canada, however the side were knocked out in the group stage having lost all three of their games against Japan, Nigeria and Costa Rica.

=== Leyton Orient ===
Cave-Brown was backup to summer (2007) signing Jon Otsemobor at Norwich, and was released at the end of the season in 2008, following Norwich's disappointing campaign. He then signed for Leyton Orient in July 2008, and made his first-team debut in Leyton Orient's 4–2 Johnston's Paint Trophy win against Southend United on 2 September. Unable to find a regular place in the first team, he was released by Orient manager Russell Slade on 9 May 2010.

=== Non-league ===
In August 2010, Cave-Brown signed for Lowestoft Town, making his debut in the 2–0 defeat at Carshalton Athletic on 21 August. During the 2011–12 season, he left Lowestoft due to work commitments outside football.

In September 2012, Cave-Brown signed for Anglian Combination club Beccles Town and made his league debut in the 2–2 draw at Wymondham Town, scoring Beccles' second goal.
