= Long Melford F.C. =

Association football club in England

Coordinates: 52°04′33.84″N 0°42′45.90″E

Long Melford
- Full name: Long Melford Football Club
- Nickname: The Villagers
- Founded: 1868
- Ground: Stoneylands, Long Melford
- Chairman: Geoff Thomas
- Manager: David Hennessey
- League: Eastern Counties League Division One North
- 2024–25: Eastern Counties League Premier Division, 19th of 20 (relegated)
Home colours	Away colours

Long Melford Football Club is a football club based in Long Melford, Suffolk, England. Affiliated to the Suffolk County FA, they are currently members of the Eastern Counties League Division One North and play at Stoneylands.

== History ==
The existence of the club was first recorded in 1868, when they won a match against Ipswich Rangers 5–1 on the Church Green. William Cobbold played for the club in their early years, and was later capped by England. During the 1887–88 season Long Melford played fifteen games, winning all but two. Following their success, they challenged Ipswich Town to a match. Although Ipswich declined, claiming that it would be injurious to their prestige if they played "little village teams", the two clubs met in the Suffolk Senior Cup semi-final, with Long Melford winning 2–1 before going on to beat Woodbridge 1–0 in a replay in the final. The club won the Senior Cup again in 1894–95, beating Saxmundham 2–1, and for a third time in 1909, beating Bury Town 1–0 in a replay. This scoreline was repeated in the 1921 final between the two clubs. In 1934 the club joined Division One of the Ipswich & District League, but left after a single season.

The 1950s were one of Long Melford's most successful periods; they won the Senior Cup in 1952–53 and retained it the following season, also finishing as runners-up in the Essex and Suffolk Border League Premier Division. In 1954–55 they won the Senior Cup for a third successive season and were Premier Division champions. The following season saw them retain the Premier Division title, and they were champions for a third time in a row in 1956–57, also winning the league's Knock-Out Cup with a 9–3 aggregate win over Bury Town Reserves. After finishing as runners-up in 1957–58, the club won their fourth title in five seasons in 1958–59. A fifth Premier Division title was won in 1960–61 and they were runners-up in 1962–63, but the club subsequently went into decline and were relegated to Division One by the end of the decade.

The 1970–71 season saw Long Melford finish as runners-up in Division One. They won the division in 1984–85 and were Knock-Out Cup winners the following season. The club won the Knock-Out Cup again in 1989–90, and after finishing as runners-up in the Premier Division in 2001–02, they were promoted to Division One of the Eastern Counties League. The club's first season in the Eastern Counties League ended with them winning the Suffolk Senior Cup for the eighth time, beating Stanton 5–0. In 2014–15 they won the Division One title and were promoted to the Premier Division. The club won the League Cup in 2018–19, defeating Fakenham Town 1–0 in the final.

In 2024–25 Long Melford finished second-from-bottom of the Premier Division and were relegated to Division One North.

== Honours ==
- Eastern Counties League
  - Division One champions 2014–15
  - League Cup winners 2018–19
- Essex & Suffolk Border League
  - Premier Division champions 1954–55, 1955–56, 1956–57, 1958–59, 1960–61
  - Division One champions 1984–85
  - Knock-Out Cup winners 1956–57, 1985–86, 1989–90
- Suffolk Senior Cup
  - Winners 1887–88, 1894–95, 1908–09, 1920–21, 1952–53, 1953–54, 1954–55, 2002–03

== Records ==
- Best FA Cup performance: Second qualifying round, 2004–05
- Best FA Vase performance: Third round, 2004–05

== See also ==
- Long Melford F.C. players
- Long Melford F.C. managers
