= 2024–25 Eastern Counties Football League =

Association football competition

The 2024–25 Eastern Counties Football League was the 82nd season in the history of the Eastern Counties Football League, a football competition in England. Teams are divided into three divisions, the Premier Division at Step 5, and the geographically separated Division One North and Division One South (Eastern Senior League), both at Step 6 of the English football league system. The constitution was announced on 17 May 2024.

== Premier Division ==
Eastern Counties Football League Premier Division
- Season: 2024–25
- Champions: Brantham Athletic
- Promoted: Brantham Athletic; Downham Town
- Relegated: Long Melford; Sheringham (resignation)
- Matches: 380
- Goals: 1,225 (3.22 per match)
- Top goalscorer: Jake Watts (Fakenham Town) (40 goals)
- Biggest home win: Long Melford 7–0 Sheringham (5 April 2025)
- Biggest away win: Sheringham 0–7 Stowmarket Town (29 March 2025)
- Highest scoring: Walsham-le-Willows 7–2 Sheringham (25 January 2025)
- All statistics correct as of 21 April 2025.

The Premier Division featured 17 clubs which competed in the division last season, along with three new clubs:

- Cornard United, promoted from Division One North
- Great Yarmouth Town, promoted from Division One North
- Stowmarket Town, relegated from the Isthmian League

=== League table ===
Pos	Team	Pld	W	D	L	GF	GA	GD	Pts	Promotion, qualification or relegation
1	Brantham Athletic (C, P)	38	25	4	9	82	44	+38	79	Promoted to the Isthmian League
2	Fakenham Town	38	25	4	9	82	46	+36	79	Qualification for the play-offs
3	Downham Town (O, P)	38	23	9	6	71	42	+29	78	Qualification for the play-offs
4	Ely City	38	21	7	10	65	44	+21	72 (Note: The fixture between Ely City and Sheringham was not played as Sheringham were not able to field a team. As a result, the league determined that the game would be awarded as a "0–0 win for Ely City", with 2 points being awarded to Ely City and 1 point being deducted from Sheringham.)	Qualification for the play-offs
5	Walsham-le-Willows	38	20	8	10	73	44	+29	70 (Note: The fixture between Walsham-le-Willows and Cornard United was not played as Cornard United were not able to field a team. As a result, the league determined that the game would be awarded as a "0–0 win for Walsham-le-Willows", with 2 points being awarded to Walsham-le-Willows and 1 point being deducted from Cornard United.)	Qualification for the play-offs
6	Mulbarton Wanderers	38	21	5	12	66	31	+35	68	
7	Dereham Town	38	18	12	8	62	33	+29	66	
8	Thetford Town	38	18	7	13	87	51	+36	61	
9	Woodbridge Town	38	18	7	13	76	63	+13	61	
10	Soham Town Rangers	38	17	10	11	64	53	+11	61	
11	Great Yarmouth Town	38	13	13	12	59	49	+10	54 (Note: On 1 March 2025, the match between Great Yarmouth Town and Stowmarket Town was played. However, for unknown reasons, the league determined that the game would be awarded as a "0–0 win for Great Yarmouth Town", with 2 points being awarded to Great Yarmouth Town and 1 point being deducted from Stowmarket Town.)	
12	Cornard United	38	16	7	15	62	70	−8	54	
13	Harleston Town	38	13	9	16	55	64	−9	48	
14	Kirkley & Pakefield	38	11	10	17	51	65	−14	43	
15	Heacham	38	12	6	20	55	70	−15	42	
16	Stowmarket Town	38	11	6	21	62	91	−29	38	
17	Hadleigh United	38	9	7	22	38	77	−39	34	
18	Lakenheath	38	8	8	22	52	82	−30	32	
19	Long Melford (R)	38	3	6	29	33	98	−65	15	Relegation to Division One North
20	Sheringham	38	2	7	29	30	108	−78	12	Resigned from the league

Source: The FA Full-Time
Rules for classification: 1) Points; 2) Goal difference; 3) Number of goals scored; 4) Number of matches won; 5) Head-to-head results
(C) Champions; (O) Play-off winners; (P) Promoted; (R) Relegated

=== Results table ===
Home \ Away	BRA	COR	DER	DOW	ELY	FAK	GYT	HAD	HAR	HEA	K&P	LAK	LNM	MUL	SHE	STR	STW	THE	WLW	WOO
Brantham Athletic	—	4–1	2–2	1–3	4–1	2–1	3–2	6–0	1–0	2–0	4–1	2–1	2–1	0–1	2–1	0–2	2–0	0–2	0–0	0–1
Cornard United	0–1	—	1–1	1–4	0–2	1–0	2–2	2–3	2–1	2–1	2–1	2–0	4–1	0–1	4–2	1–1	4–2	2–2	1–0	0–6
Dereham Town	1–0	0–0	—	1–3	1–0	2–0	1–1	4–0	1–1	3–2	2–0	1–1	2–0	2–1	2–1	1–1	5–0	0–1	2–0	4–2
Downham Town	3–2	1–1	1–0	—	2–0	0–1	2–0	2–0	2–0	2–1	2–2	1–1	3–0	1–0	3–1	4–1	2–0	1–0	3–1	1–0
Ely City	3–0	4–2	1–1	3–1	—	5–2	0–0	2–1	2–0	1–0	2–0	1–0	2–0	0–2	H/W	1–2	2–2	2–1	3–2	3–2
Fakenham Town	2–2	1–0	2–1	2–1	4–3	—	2–1	5–0	2–0	4–3	5–1	3–1	2–1	1–1	4–2	1–0	4–0	3–0	1–2	1–2
Great Yarmouth Town	1–1	4–1	1–2	1–2	2–0	4–1	—	1–3	1–3	6–1	2–1	2–1	2–0	0–3	5–1	1–0	H/W	0–0	1–2	0–0
Hadleigh United	2–4	1–2	2–0	1–2	0–0	1–5	0–0	—	2–1	0–0	1–1	3–1	0–0	0–3	1–0	0–1	4–3	1–2	0–0	1–3
Harleston Town	5–3	0–3	0–3	1–1	2–1	0–1	1–1	0–2	—	4–2	2–2	4–0	1–0	1–0	3–1	0–0	4–3	2–2	1–1	2–1
Heacham	0–3	3–1	1–3	3–1	0–0	1–3	1–1	4–0	3–1	—	1–1	3–1	0–2	0–0	3–0	0–3	4–2	1–2	1–2	2–1
Kirkley & Pakefield	1–3	3–1	1–1	1–2	2–0	1–0	1–1	1–0	4–0	0–0	—	0–0	1–0	0–2	4–0	2–3	2–1	1–5	0–2	2–5
Lakenheath	1–3	1–2	0–5	3–3	0–4	2–2	3–2	3–0	3–1	1–2	2–3	—	2–2	1–2	3–0	3–1	1–2	0–2	0–1	3–2
Long Melford	0–2	1–3	0–3	1–2	1–4	0–4	1–1	2–1	2–3	0–3	0–0	1–2	—	0–3	7–0	1–5	2–2	0–6	1–5	0–3
Mulbarton Wanderers	1–2	3–1	0–0	0–1	2–3	1–0	1–0	5–1	2–2	5–0	1–2	5–2	4–0	—	0–0	1–2	2–0	1–0	2–3	2–0
Sheringham	1–4	0–2	0–2	0–0	1–2	1–2	1–3	1–4	0–3	0–3	1–3	1–2	2–2	1–0	—	1–0	0–7	0–0	2–2	2–5
Soham Town Rangers	0–3	1–3	2–0	2–2	2–0	2–2	0–1	1–0	2–2	4–3	3–1	2–2	2–1	1–0	2–2	—	0–3	4–0	2–3	2–2
Stowmarket Town	2–4	5–2	1–0	1–1	1–2	0–1	2–2	2–1	2–3	0–2	3–2	4–2	3–2	0–4	3–0	0–5	—	3–3	0–4	1–3
Thetford Town	0–2	6–1	2–2	3–2	0–2	0–1	1–3	6–1	2–0	4–1	3–2	3–0	5–0	1–2	7–1	0–1	6–0	—	4–1	3–4
Walsham-le-Willows	1–2	H/W	1–0	2–2	1–3	1–2	4–1	1–0	3–1	4–0	2–0	1–1	3–0	2–1	7–2	4–0	0–1	3–3	—	0–1
Woodbridge Town	0–4	1–5	1–1	4–2	1–1	1–5	1–3	1–1	1–0	1–0	1–1	4–2	6–1	1–2	2–1	2–2	4–1	1–0	0–2	—

Source: The FA Full-Time
Legend: Blue = home team win; Yellow = draw; Red = away team win.
For upcoming matches, an "a" indicates there is an article about the rivalry between the two participants.

=== Play-offs ===
Semi-finals
2	Fakenham Town	0
5	Walsham-le-Willows	1
3	Downham Town	3
4	Ely City	0

Final
3	Downham Town	2
5	Walsham-le-Willows	1

==== Semifinals ====
26 April 2025	Fakenham Town	0–1	Walsham-le-Willows	Fakenham
15:00		Report	Huckvale	Stadium: Clipbush Park; Attendance: 385; Referee: Adam Everett

26 April 2025	Downham Town	3–0	Ely City	Downham Market
15:00	Edge; Royle; Sivakumar	Report		Stadium: Memorial Field; Attendance: 436; Referee: James Black

==== Final ====
4 May	Downham Town	2–1	Walsham-le-Willows	Downham Market
15:00 GMT	Edge, (pen.)	Report	Glover	Stadium: Memorial Field; Attendance: 705; Referee: Bruno Marques

=== Stadia and locations ===
Locations of the Premier Division clubs

Team	Stadium	Capacity
Brantham Athletic	Brantham Leisure Centre	1,200
Cornard United	Blackhouse Lane	
Dereham Town	Aldiss Park	3,000
Downham Town	Memorial Field	1,000
Ely City	Unwin Sports Ground	1,500
Fakenham Town	Clipbush Park	2,000
Great Yarmouth Town	Wellesley Recreation Ground	3,600
Hadleigh United	Millfield	3,000
Harleston Town	Wilderness Lane	
Heacham	Station Road	
Kirkley & Pakefield	Walmer Road	2,000
Lakenheath	The Nest	
Long Melford	Stoneylands	
Mulbarton Wanderers	The Common	
Sheringham	Weybourne Road	
Soham Town Rangers	Julius Martin Lane	2,000
Stowmarket Town	Greens Meadow	1,000
Thetford Town	Mundford Road	1,500
Walsham-le-Willows	Summer Road	1,000
Woodbridge Town	Notcutts Park	3,000

== Division One North ==
Eastern Counties Football League Division One North
- Season: 2024–25
- Champions: Haverhill Rovers
- Promoted: Haverhill Rovers; Harwich & Parkeston
- Relegated: Whitton United (resignation); Swaffham Town
- Matches: 380
- Goals: 1,337 (3.52 per match)
- Top goalscorer: Max Willett (Framlingham Town) (34 goals)
- Biggest home win: Framlingham Town 12–0 Whittlesey Athletic (7 September 2024)
- Biggest away win: FC Peterborough 0–7 Holland (3 August 2024); Dussindale & Hellesdon Rovers 0–7 Diss Town (16 October 2024); Wivenhoe Town 0–7 FC Peterborough (29 March 2025)
- Highest scoring: Haverhill Rovers 13–2 Swaffham Town (14 December 2024)
- All statistics correct as of 21 April 2025.

Division One North featured 18 clubs which competed in the previous season, along with two new clubs.

- Gorleston reserves, promoted from the Anglian Combination
- Pinchbeck United, relegated from the United Counties League

=== League table ===
Pos	Team	Pld	W	D	L	GF	GA	GD	Pts	Promotion, qualification or relegation
1	Haverhill Rovers (C, P)	38	32	3	3	107	34	+73	99	Promoted to the Premier Division
2	Stanway Pegasus	38	29	2	7	88	29	+59	89	Qualification for the play-offs
3	Harwich & Parkeston (O, P)	38	26	5	7	104	43	+61	83	Qualification for the play-offs
4	Framlingham Town	38	23	6	9	107	38	+69	75	Qualification for the play-offs
5	Diss Town	38	21	9	8	72	42	+30	72	Qualification for the play-offs
6	FC Peterborough	38	21	7	10	95	59	+36	70	
7	Gorleston reserves	38	19	7	12	80	63	+17	64	
8	Holbeach United	38	17	6	15	73	63	+10	57	
9	Pinchbeck United	38	16	9	13	60	54	+6	57	Transferred to the United Counties League
10	FC Parson Drove	38	16	7	15	58	59	−1	55	
11	Holland	38	15	4	19	71	75	−4	49	
12	Whittlesey Athletic	38	14	6	18	47	87	−40	48	
13	AFC Sudbury reserves	38	14	3	21	56	75	−19	45	
14	Whitton United	38	13	3	22	43	60	−17	42	Resigned from the league
15	Dussindale & Hellesdon Rovers	38	10	8	20	58	79	−21	38	
16	Wivenhoe Town	38	10	5	23	46	83	−37	35	
17	Leiston under 23s	38	10	4	24	59	90	−31	34	
18	Haverhill Borough	38	7	10	21	51	80	−29	31	Reprieved from relegation
19	Needham Market reserves	38	7	9	22	41	73	−32	30	Reprieved from relegation
20	Swaffham Town (R)	38	2	3	33	21	151	−130	9	Relegation to the Anglian Combination

Source: The FA Full-Time
Rules for classification: 1) Points; 2) Goal difference; 3) Number of goals scored; 4) Number of matches won; 5) Head-to-head results
(C) Champions; (O) Play-off winners; (P) Promoted; (R) Relegated

=== Results table ===
Home \ Away	SUD	DIS	DHR	FPD	PET	FRA	GOR	H&P	HVB	HVR	HLB	HLD	LEI	NHM	PIN	STP	SWF	WTY	WTN	WIV
AFC Sudbury reserves	—	0–3	2–1	0–4	1–2	1–3	1–1	4–2	4–1	0–5	0–2	2–1	3–2	1–3	1–3	0–4	8–2	1–0	3–0	1–1
Diss Town	1–0	—	1–1	1–0	2–5	2–0	2–3	0–1	1–1	1–1	2–3	2–1	3–0	2–2	3–1	1–0	1–0	3–0	1–0	2–0
Dussindale & Hellesdon Rovers	1–0	0–7	—	3–0	6–1	2–4	1–5	0–4	2–2	2–3	0–3	1–4	1–2	0–1	2–3	0–1	5–1	1–1	3–1	2–2
FC Parson Drove	0–1	0–3	2–3	—	1–1	0–3	2–1	0–1	0–0	0–3	1–5	3–1	5–1	3–2	1–0	2–3	4–1	2–2	0–1	4–0
FC Peterborough	6–1	2–1	1–1	0–0	—	2–0	0–1	1–3	4–1	4–2	2–3	0–7	3–2	2–0	1–1	2–1	7–1	1–2	1–0	2–1
Framlingham Town	6–0	0–1	2–1	5–0	0–1	—	4–0	1–0	3–3	2–0	1–1	4–1	2–0	2–2	2–0	0–1	7–0	12–0	2–0	5–0
Gorleston reserves	6–2	2–2	2–1	0–2	2–4	3–2	—	2–2	4–0	2–3	4–1	2–2	2–2	0–3	3–0	1–5	2–1	5–2	3–1	1–0
Harwich & Parkeston	1–0	1–3	5–0	5–1	2–2	3–2	3–0	—	3–2	2–3	5–0	5–4	6–0	3–0	2–1	1–0	3–0	8–0	3–1	4–0
Haverhill Borough	0–2	0–1	3–2	0–3	2–5	0–4	1–1	1–5	—	1–2	1–1	2–4	1–3	2–0	2–2	1–2	4–0	3–0	0–1	0–1
Haverhill Rovers	3–2	1–0	3–0	3–0	3–2	2–2	1–0	2–2	4–1	—	3–0	5–1	2–1	3–2	2–0	2–0	13–2	4–0	2–0	4–0
Holbeach United	0–1	2–2	0–1	1–4	2–2	1–2	3–2	0–3	1–4	0–2	—	1–1	3–2	3–1	2–3	0–3	8–0	4–0	3–0	2–3
Holland	2–0	2–1	2–1	1–1	1–4	1–2	1–2	1–1	1–0	1–2	1–3	—	3–2	6–0	0–3	1–3	4–0	4–2	1–5	3–2
Leiston under 23s	1–0	1–2	3–3	1–2	0–3	3–0	1–3	3–4	3–2	1–0	2–2	0–1	—	3–0	1–4	1–4	7–2	4–2	1–4	1–1
Needham Market reserves	0–2	1–2	0–1	1–3	2–2	1–1	1–2	2–2	0–2	1–5	0–3	4–0	1–0	—	0–1	0–4	0–0	1–1	1–2	2–3
Pinchbeck United	2–0	1–1	1–1	0–0	1–0	1–6	2–2	2–4	3–3	0–1	0–4	4–1	1–2	0–0	—	1–0	3–0	3–0	2–0	3–3
Stanway Pegasus	1–0	4–4	2–1	3–1	1–0	1–1	1–0	1–0	3–1	0–1	3–1	3–2	5–0	4–0	1–0	—	6–0	1–2	2–1	3–1
Swaffham Town	0–4	1–6	1–1	1–2	0–8	0–6	0–6	0–1	1–2	1–6	0–1	0–3	2–1	0–4	0–2	0–4	—	1–2	0–0	1–0
Whittlesey Athletic	2–2	5–0	2–1	1–1	3–4	1–2	0–1	1–0	2–0	0–2	1–0	1–0	3–2	0–0	3–2	0–5	2–0	—	2–3	0–4
Whitton United	0–4	0–0	0–3	0–2	2–1	3–2	0–3	2–1	0–0	1–3	1–2	2–0	2–0	0–3	0–2	0–1	5–0	0–1	—	5–1
Wivenhoe Town	3–2	0–2	2–3	1–2	0–7	0–5	4–1	1–3	2–2	0–1	0–2	0–1	3–0	3–0	0–2	0–2	3–2	0–1	1–0	—

Source: The FA Full-Time
Legend: Blue = home team win; Yellow = draw; Red = away team win.
For upcoming matches, an "a" indicates there is an article about the rivalry between the two participants.

=== Play-offs ===
Semi-finals
2	Stanway Pegasus	2
5	Diss Town	0
3	Harwich & Parkeston	2
4	Framlingham Town	0

Final
2	Stanway Pegasus	2(4)
3	Harwich & Parkeston	2(5)

==== Semifinals ====
26 April	Stanway Pegasus	2–0	Diss Town	Coggeshall
15:00 GMT	Williams 59'; Ketley-Gregan 73'	Report		Stadium: West Street; Attendance: 311; Referee: Rhys Collins

26 April	Harwich & Parkeston	2–0	Framlingham Town	Harwich
15:00 GMT	Canning 38'; Knight	Report		Stadium: Royal Oak; Attendance: 385; Referee: Henry Harvey

==== Final ====
3 May	Stanway Pegasus	2–2 (4–5 p)	Harwich & Parkeston	Coggeshall
15:00 GMT	Lewis 19', 66'	Report	Mayhew 35'; Spurling	Stadium: West Street; Attendance: 868; Referee: Lee Kendrick

=== Stadia and locations ===
Locations of Division One North clubs

Team	Stadium	Capacity
AFC Sudbury reserves	King's Marsh	2,500
Diss Town	Brewers Green Lane	2,500
Dussindale & Hellesdon Rovers	The Nest	1,000
FC Parson Drove	Main Road	
FC Peterborough	The Focus Centre	
Framlingham Town	Badingham Road	
Gorleston reserves	The Nest (groundshare with Dussindale & Hellesdon Rovers)	1,000
Harwich & Parkeston	Royal Oak	
Haverhill Borough	New Croft (groundshare with Haverhill Rovers)	3,000
Haverhill Rovers	New Croft	3,000
Holbeach United	Carters Park	4,000
Holland	Dulwich Road	
Leiston under 23s	Victory Road	2,500
Needham Market reserves	Bloomfields	4,000
Pinchbeck United	Sir Halley Stewart Field	2,700
Stanway Pegasus	West Street (groundshare with Coggeshall Town)	2,000
Swaffham Town	Shoemakers Lane	
Whittlesey Athletic	Feldale Field	
Whitton United	King George V Playing Fields	1,000
Wivenhoe Town	Broad Lane	2,876

== Division One South ==
Eastern Counties Football League Division One South
- Season: 2024–25
- Champions: Harlow Town
- Promoted: Harlow Town; Hackney Wick
- Relegated: St Margaretsbury
- Matches: 380
- Goals: 1,468 (3.86 per match)
- Top goalscorer: Reece Simpson (AS London) (35 goals)
- Biggest home win: Hutton 10–0 Newbury Forest (31 July 2024)
- Biggest away win: Newbury Forest 0–8 AS London (2 November 2024); Dunmow Town 0–8 Brimsdown (18 March 2025)
- Highest scoring: Hutton 10–0 Newbury Forest (31 July 2024); Hackney Wick 6–4 Basildon Town (23 October 2024)
- All statistics correct as of 21 April 2025.

Division One South featured 17 clubs which competed in the division last season, along with three new clubs:

- Coggeshall Town, relegated from the Essex Senior League
- FC Baresi, promoted from the Essex Alliance League
- Rayleigh Town, promoted from the Essex Olympian League

Additionally, Park View was renamed to AS London.

=== League table ===
Pos	Team	Pld	W	D	L	GF	GA	GD	Pts	Promotion, qualification or relegation
1	Harlow Town (C, P)	38	29	5	4	102	31	+71	92	Promoted to the Spartan South Midlands League
2	Hackney Wick (O, P)	38	29	5	4	97	38	+59	92	Qualification for the play-offs
3	AS London	38	23	4	11	106	46	+60	75 (Note: On 30 November 2024, the match between AS London and Cannons Wood was abandoned after an incident of racial abuse. As a result, the league determined that the game would be awarded as a "0–0 win" for AS London, with 2 points being awarded to AS London and 1 point being deducted from Cannons Wood.)	Qualification for the play-offs
4	Rayleigh Town	38	23	5	10	87	51	+36	74	Qualification for the play-offs
5	Hutton	38	22	5	11	94	51	+43	71	Qualification for the play-offs
6	Coggeshall Town	38	20	10	8	72	50	+22	70	
7	Cannons Wood	38	17	10	11	94	84	+10	60	
8	Hoddesdon Town	38	16	11	11	68	62	+6	59	
9	Basildon Town	38	14	7	17	63	66	−3	49	
10	May & Baker	38	15	4	19	79	87	−8	49	
11	Burnham Ramblers	38	14	5	19	70	86	−16	47	
12	Dunmow Town	38	13	8	17	60	81	−21	47	
13	Brimsdown	38	12	9	17	66	65	+1	45	
14	FC Baresi	38	14	3	21	81	100	−19	45	
15	Enfield Borough	38	11	7	20	69	78	−9	40	
16	NW London	38	11	7	20	56	105	−49	40	
17	Barkingside	38	10	8	20	48	72	−24	38	
18	Southend Manor	38	8	10	20	72	89	−17	34	Reprieved from relegation
19	Newbury Forest	38	7	9	22	59	113	−54	30	Reprieved from relegation
20	St Margaretsbury (R)	38	3	6	29	25	113	−88	15	Relegation to the Hertfordshire Senior County League

Source: The FA Full-Time
Rules for classification: 1) Points; 2) Goal difference; 3) Number of goals scored; 4) Number of matches won; 5) Head-to-head results
(C) Champions; (O) Play-off winners; (P) Promoted; (R) Relegated

=== Results table ===
Home \ Away	ASL	BRK	BAS	BRM	BUR	CNW	COG	DUN	EFB	BSI	HNW	HAR	HOD	HUT	M&B	NBF	NWL	RAY	SEM	STM
AS London	—	2–2	2–1	2–0	5–0	H/W	2–0	0–3	5–2	8–0	0–2	0–3	3–0	2–0	7–2	2–1	2–3	5–0	3–1	8–1
Barkingside	1–4	—	2–0	1–1	2–1	2–1	2–2	3–0	0–0	0–5	1–5	1–2	1–1	2–3	1–2	3–0	1–2	2–3	1–1	3–1
Basildon Town	2–3	1–0	—	1–1	1–4	0–1	0–1	2–2	1–0	1–0	2–1	0–5	1–3	1–0	2–3	1–1	4–0	1–2	2–2	1–1
Brimsdown	0–0	0–0	2–1	—	5–2	4–3	1–2	5–1	1–1	1–2	1–2	0–3	1–3	0–4	1–1	4–2	1–2	0–3	5–4	2–0
Burnham Ramblers	2–1	0–2	0–1	3–1	—	3–6	4–2	1–5	2–1	4–2	0–1	0–3	4–1	1–4	1–2	1–0	5–0	3–1	3–2	1–1
Cannons Wood	4–2	1–4	2–5	2–0	2–1	—	3–3	2–0	3–3	0–7	4–3	1–5	0–4	2–2	3–1	5–0	7–2	2–2	5–1	4–0
Coggeshall Town	0–2	3–1	5–1	3–0	3–0	2–1	—	3–3	2–0	4–3	0–0	1–3	0–2	0–0	2–0	2–2	2–0	0–3	1–0	2–2
Dunmow Town	0–4	3–0	1–3	0–8	1–1	1–1	0–2	—	2–1	4–1	1–1	1–2	1–3	1–3	2–1	1–1	3–1	0–2	2–0	1–1
Enfield Borough	1–3	3–1	3–3	1–0	5–1	2–3	2–3	1–2	—	1–2	0–2	3–2	2–2	3–5	4–0	1–2	3–3	0–4	1–1	3–0
FC Baresi	1–2	2–0	3–5	1–1	4–3	1–5	1–6	0–5	3–4	—	1–2	1–3	3–4	2–1	1–2	5–4	1–3	0–3	4–2	5–1
Hackney Wick	2–0	1–0	6–4	3–2	3–1	2–0	0–1	6–0	2–0	2–2	—	1–3	3–1	2–1	5–1	2–2	4–1	5–2	1–0	2–1
Harlow Town	1–1	4–0	2–1	2–2	4–2	1–0	2–0	3–1	3–1	2–0	1–2	—	0–0	1–0	5–1	7–0	5–3	0–1	3–1	6–1
Hoddesdon Town	2–1	3–0	0–3	2–1	1–1	3–3	1–3	1–3	2–1	1–4	1–2	1–1	—	2–0	4–1	1–1	3–0	1–1	1–1	1–1
Hutton	2–0	4–2	1–0	0–2	1–1	2–6	0–2	3–2	3–1	4–3	1–2	0–1	1–1	—	7–1	10–0	2–0	5–1	3–2	6–0
May & Baker	3–1	1–2	2–1	2–1	1–2	1–2	3–1	1–1	2–3	7–2	1–3	3–2	3–0	0–1	—	1–2	1–3	0–1	3–2	7–1
Newbury Forest	0–8	1–0	2–4	1–2	4–3	3–3	2–2	2–3	1–4	1–2	0–3	0–4	2–3	0–4	3–3	—	1–2	1–1	3–2	6–1
NW London	0–6	1–1	0–3	0–3	0–2	2–3	2–2	4–1	2–4	3–3	0–7	0–0	2–4	0–2	2–2	4–2	—	1–7	3–0	2–1
Rayleigh Town	1–5	0–2	0–1	2–1	4–0	6–0	1–1	2–0	1–0	0–2	1–4	1–2	4–2	2–2	5–2	4–0	6–0	—	2–0	5–0
Southend Manor	3–2	5–1	1–1	3–3	3–3	3–3	1–2	6–2	4–2	0–2	1–1	0–1	3–1	2–5	1–6	5–3	1–1	1–2	—	4–1
St Margaretsbury	0–3	3–1	2–1	0–3	1–4	1–1	0–2	0–1	0–2	1–0	0–2	0–5	0–2	1–2	0–6	0–3	0–2	0–1	1–3	—

Source: The FA Full-Time
Legend: Blue = home team win; Yellow = draw; Red = away team win.
For upcoming matches, an "a" indicates there is an article about the rivalry between the two participants.

=== Play-offs ===
Semi-finals
2	Hackney Wick	4
5	Hutton	1
3	AS London	1
4	Rayleigh Town	4

Final
2	Hackney Wick	2
4	Rayleigh Town	0

==== Semifinals ====
26 April	Hackney Wick	4–1	Hutton	Witham
15:00 GMT	Brown 55'; Pola 62', 67'; Sidibe 80'	Report	Mattock	Stadium: Spa Road; Attendance: 55; Referee: Gavin Jolley

6 May	Rayleigh Town	4–1	AS London	Canvey Island
19:45 GMT	Irish; Sweetman; Wright	Report	Muhemba	Stadium: Thames Road; Attendance: 226; Referee: Dwayne Uylett

==== Final ====
13 May	Hackney Wick	2–0	Rayleigh Town	Witham
19:45	Sidibe 3'; Cheniti 25'	Report		Stadium: Spa Road; Attendance: 445; Referee: Cameron Saunders

=== Stadia and locations ===
Locations of Division One South clubs
Greater London Division One South football clubs

Team	Stadium	Capacity
AS London	New River Stadium	5,000
Barkingside	Cricklefield Stadium (groundshare with Ilford)	3,500
Basildon Town	Gardiners Close (groundshare with Basildon United)	2,000
Brimsdown	Wormley Playing Fields (groundshare with Wormley Rovers)	500
Burnham Ramblers	Leslie Fields	2,000
Cannons Wood	Parkside Stadium (groundshare with Aveley)	3,500
Coggeshall Town	West Street	2,000
Dunmow Town	Catons Lane (groundshare with Saffron Walden Town)	3,000
Enfield Borough	The Maurice Rebak Stadium (groundshare with Wingate & Finchley)	1,500
FC Baresi	Wodson Park (groundshare with Ware)	3,300
Hackney Wick	Spa Road (groundshare with Witham Town)	2,500
Harlow Town	The Harlow Arena	3,500
Hoddesdon Town	Lowfield	3,000
Hutton	New Lodge (groundshare with Billericay Town)	3,500
May & Baker	Parsloes Park	1,500
Newbury Forest	Oakside Stadium (groundshare with Redbridge)	3,000
NW London	Coles Park (groundshare with Haringey Borough)	2,500
Rayleigh Town	Thames Road (groundshare with Concord Rangers)	3,300
Southend Manor	Southchurch Park	2,000
St Margaretsbury	Recreation Ground	1,000
