= Langford Baker =

English footballer

Personal information
- Date of birth: 29 March 1879
- Place of birth: Lowestoft, England
- Date of death: 20 May 1964 (aged 85)
- Position: Inside forward

Senior career*
Years	Team	Apps	(Gls)
1897–1898	Lowestoft North End		
1898–1899	Lowestoft Harriers		
1899–1900	Lowestoft Town		
1900–1904	Norwich City		
1904–1906	Grimsby Town	59	(16)
1906–1907	Norwich City		
1907–19??	East Halton Rovers		
- * Club domestic league appearances and goals

Langford Baker (29 March 1879 – 20 May 1964) was an English professional footballer who played as an inside forward. He played for Lowestoft Town in the 1900 final of the FA Amateur Cup.
