= Suffolk Senior Cup =

- Organiser(s): Suffolk County FA
- Founded: 1885
- Region: Suffolk
- Teams: 31 (2023–24)
- Current champions: Trimley Red Devils (back to back titles)
- Most championships: Ipswich Town (16 titles)
- Website: Suffolk County FA

The Suffolk Senior Cup is the second level football cup competition organised by the Suffolk FA after the Suffolk Premier Cup. It is currently open to Suffolk–based clubs competing in Eastern Counties League Division One and the top divisions of the Suffolk & Ipswich League, the Essex & Suffolk Border League, the Anglian Combination and the Cambridgeshire League. The current holders are Trimley Red Devils FC.

== History ==
The cup was first played during the 1885–86 season, and was initially known as the Suffolk Football Association Challenge Cup. During the 1899–1900 season the competition was renamed Suffolk County Senior Cup when a Junior Cup was also introduced. In 1907 the Suffolk Football Association split, with one affiliating to the Football Association and the other to the Amateur Football Association, with both new organisations running a competition called the Suffolk Senior Cup. The AFA-affiliated organisation continued to use the original trophy, and the FA-affiliated one using a new trophy. The two reunited in 1914 when the AFA affiliated to the Football Association.

The competition was temporarily halted during World War I before it resumed in 1919, using the trophy that the FA-affiliated organisation had used. The original trophy was returned in 1921, with the newer trophy then being used for the Minor Cup competition. The Suffolk Senior Cup was interrupted again during World War II, resuming in 1945. In 1956 a new competition, the Suffolk Premier Cup was introduced for clubs in the Eastern Counties League and leagues above, with the Senior Cup becoming a secondary competition for clubs below the Eastern Counties League.

== Past finals ==
Season	Winners	Score	Runners–up	Attendance
1885–86	Woodbridge Association	2–2	Ipswich Town	
Replay	Woodbridge Association	0–0	Ipswich Town	
Second replay	Woodbridge Association	3–1	Ipswich Town	
1886–87	Ipswich Town	2–1	Ipswich School	1,000
1887–88	Long Melford	2–2	Woodbridge	
Replay	Long Melford	1–0	Woodbridge	
1888–89	Ipswich Town	4–0	Newmarket Town	3,000
1889–90	Ipswich Town	4–1	Long Melford	
1890–91	Framlingham College	4–0	Stowmarket	
1891–92	Beccles College	5–1	Leiston	
1892–93	Beccles Caxton	2–0	Framlingham College	
1893–94	Framlingham College	3–1	Ipswich Middle School	
1894–95	Long Melford	2–1	Saxmundham	
1895–96	Ipswich Town	2–0	Beccles Caxton	1,500
1896–97	Beccles Caxton	1–0	Leiston	
1897–98	Beccles Caxton	2–0	Kirkley	
1898–99	Beccles Caxton	0–0	Kirkley	
Replay	Beccles Caxton	2–2	Kirkley	
Second replay	Beccles Caxton	2–1	Kirkley	
1899–1900	Ipswich Town	5–1	Beccles College	2,000
1900–01	Kirkley	3–0	Ipswich Town	
1901–02	Kirkley	6–0	Haverhill Rovers	
1902–03	Lowestoft Town	2–0	Kirkley	
1903–04	Ipswich Town	3–2	Leiston	2,700
1904–05	Ipswich Town	2–0	Lowetsoft Town	2,000
1905–06	Ipswich Town	6–1	Haverhill Rovers	1,500
1906–07	Ipswich Town	2–1	Bury St Edmunds	4,000
1907–08	Ipswich Town	3–0	Bury Alexandra	2,500
1908–09	Long Melford	2–2	Bury Town	
Replay	Long Melford	1–0	Bury Town	
1909–10	Cambridge Town	0–0	Stowmarket	
Replay	Cambridge Town	3–0	Stowmarket	
1910–11	Suffolk District Asylum	2–2	Bury Town	
Replay	Suffolk District Asylum	1–0	Bury Town	
1911–12	Ipswich Town	2–1	Haverhill Rovers	3,100
1912–13	Ipswich Town	2–1	All Saints United	1,800
1913–14	Ipswich Town	1–1	Ipswich YMCA	
Replay	Ipswich Town	3–0	Ipswich YMCA	
1919–20	Beccles Town	5–1	Haverhill Rovers	3,000
1920–21	Long Melford	1–0	Bury Town	
1921–22	Beccles Town		Ipswich GER	
Replay	Beccles Town	3–2	Ipswich GER	
1922–23	Lowestoft Town	2–0	Stowmarket Town	
1923–24	Lowestoft Town	3–1	Beccles Town	
1924–25	Kirkley	1–0	Brantham Athletic	
1925–26	Lowestoft Town	2–1	RAF Martlesham Heath	
1926–27	Brantham Athletic	3–0	Lowestoft Town	8,903
1927–28	Ipswich Town	2–0	HMS Ganges	11,669
1928–29	Ipswich Town	5–0	Woodbridge Town	8,349
1929–30	Ipswich Town	6–0	Sudbury Town	8,858
1930–31	Stowmarket Town	3–1	Sudbury Town	
1931–32	Lowestoft Town	3–2	Stowmarket Town	
1932–33	Stowmarket Town	5–2	Kirkley	4,500
1933–34	Stowmarket Town	3–0	Bury Town	
1934–35	Newmarket Town	3–1	Kirkley	
1935–36	Lowestoft Town	4–1	Ipswich Town	
1936–37	Bury Town	2–0	Sudbury Town	
1937–38	Bury Town	3–1	Ipswich Town Reserves	
1938–39	Bury Town	4–0	RAF Mildenhall	
1945–46	Bury Town	4–2 (2–0, 2–2)	Newmarket Town	
1946–47	Lowestoft Town	3–0	Bungay Town	
1947–48	Lowestoft Town	3–1	Whitton United	
1948–49	Lowestoft Town	5–0	Leiston	
1949–50	Bungay Town	2–0	Lowestoft Town	
1950–51	Stowmarket Town	2–0	Sudbury Town	10,867
1951–52	Stowmarket Town	2–2	Bury Town	
Replay	Stowmarket Town	4–1	Bury Town	
1952–53	Long Melford	1–1	Sudbury Town	
Replay	Long Melford	1–0	Sudbury Town	
1953–54	Long Melford	2–0	Sudbury Town	
1954–55	Long Melford	2–0	Ipswich Town Reserves	
1955–56	Lowestoft Town	2–1	Long Melford	
1956–57	Sudbury Town	3–1	Bury Town	
1957–58	Stowmarket Town	2–0	Newmarket Town	
1958–59	Whitton United	3–0	Bungay Town	
1959–60	Brantham Athletic	1–1	Christchurch Athletic	
Replay	Brantham Athletic	3–2	Christchurch Athletic	
1960–61	Bungay Town	4–4	Orwell Works	
Replay	Bungay Town	1–0	Orwell Works	
1961–62	Stowmarket Town	2–0	Brantham Athletic	
1962–63	Whitton United	3–0	Bungay Town	
1963–64	Grundisburgh	1–1	Felixstowe Town	
Replay	Grundisburgh	3–1	Felixstowe Town	
1964–65	Stowmarket Town	4–0	Orwell Works	
1965–66	Oulton Broad	1–1	Leiston	
Replay	Oulton Broad	2–1	Leiston	
1966–67	Felixstowe Town	3–2	Oulton Broad	
1967–68	ICI	4–0	Electricity Supply	
1968–69	Hadleigh United	3–2	Westerfield United	
1969–70	Waterside Works	1–0	Long Melford	
1970–71	Crane Sports	3–1	Needham Market	
1971–72	Hadleigh United	1–0	ICI	
1972–73	Heath Row	3–2	Birds Eye	
1973–74	Crane Sports	1–0	Heath Row Rushmere YAC	
1974–75	Felixstowe Town	3–2	Nicholians Locomotive	
1975–76	Brantham Athletic	2–1	Hadleigh United	
1976–77	Nicholians Locomotive	2–1	Hadleigh United	
1977–78	Woodbridge Town	2–1	Crane Sports	
1978–79	Ransomes	3–0	Sudbury Wanderers	
1979–80	Nicholians Locomotive	0–0	Needham Market	
Replay	Nicholians Locomotive	3–2	Needham Market	
1980–81	Ransomes	1–0	Westerfield	
1981–82	Crane Sports	1–0	Wickham Market	
1982–83	Hadleigh United	4–1	Crane Sports	
1983–84	Crane Sports	2–1	Ipswich United	
1984–85	Bury Town reserves	1–0	Westerfield United	
1985–86	Westerfield United	4–1	Leiston	
1986–87	Sudbury Town reserves	3–0	Ipswich United	
1987–88	Grundisburgh	2–0	Haughley United	
1988–89	Cornard United	1–0	Sudbury Wanderers	
1989–90	Needham Market	1–0	Grundisburgh	
1990–91	Sudbury Wanderers	5–1	BT Research	
1991–92	Whitton United	2–0	Long Melford	
1992–93	Woodbridge Town	5–2	Stonham Aspal	
1993–94	Woodbridge Town	4–0	Saxmundham Sports	
1994–95	Grundisburgh	2–0	Whitton United	
1995–96	Grundisburgh	3–0	Framlingham Town	
1996–97	Haverhill Rovers	4–1	Ipswich Wanderers	
1997–98	Grundisburgh	2–1	Stonham Aspal	
1998–99	Walton United	1–0	Needham Market	
1999–00	Grundisburgh	3–1	Needham Market	
2000–01	Kirkley	3–1	Ipswich Athletic	
2001–02	Kirkley	4–3	Haverhill Rovers	
2002–03	Long Melford	5–0	Stanton	1,200+
2003–04	Hadleigh United	2–2	Long Melford	
	Hadleigh United win 7–6 on penalties			
2004–05	Needham Market	2–1	Walsham–le–Willows	
2005–06	Walsham-le-Willows	4–3	Capel Plough	
2006–07	Stowmarket Town	2–1	Grundisburgh	
2007–08	Grundisburgh	3–2	Hadleigh United	
2008–09	Beccles Town	1–0	Crane Sports	1,103
2009–10	Team Bury	2–0	Capel Plough	856
2010–11	Whitton United	1–0	Lakenheath	1,177
2011–12	Whitton United	2–1	Long Melford	864
2012–13	Ipswich Wanderers	1–1	Whitton United	1,045
	Ipswich Wanderers win 3–2 on penalties			
2013-14	Whitton United	1–0	Ipswich Wanderers	421
2014–15	Lakenheath	7–0	Ipswich Valley Rangers	307
2015–16	Waveney	3–2	Haughley United	
2016–17	Achilles	2–1	Crane Sports	1,190
2017–18	Woodbridge Town	3–0	Bungay Town	987
2018–19	Achilles	4–3	Cornard United	768
2019–20	Ipswich Wanderers	1–0	Coplestonians	
2020–21	Lakenheath	2–0	Bildeston Rangers	
2021–22	Ipswich Wanderers	1–0	Leiston reserves	
2022–23	Framlingham Town	2–0	AFC Sudbury reserves	
2023–24	Trimley Red Devils	2–0	Leiston U23s	
2024–25	Trimley Red Devils	2–0	Whitton United	

=== Wins by club ===
Club	Wins	First final won	Last final won	Runner-up	Last final lost	Total final apps.	Notes
Ipswich Town	16	1886–87	1929–30	5	1954–55	21	
Lowestoft Town	10	1902–03	1955–56	2	1949–50	12	
Stowmarket Town	9	1930–31	2006–07	2	1931–32	11	
Long Melford	8	1887–88	2002–03	6	2011–12	14	
Grundisburgh	7	1963–64	2007–08	2	2006–07	9	
Whitton United	6	1958–59	2013–14	3	2012–13	9	
Bury Town	5	1936–37	1984–85	6	1956–57	11	(Note: Won one title as Bury Town reserves)
Kirkley	5	1900–01	2001–02	5	1934–35	10	
Woodbridge Town	5	1885–86	2017–18	2	1928–29	7	(Note: Won one title as Woodbridge)
Beccles Caxton	4	1892–93	1898–99	1	1895–96	5	
Crane Sports †	4	1970–71	1983–84	4	2016–17	8	(Note: Dissolved in 2021)
Hadleigh United	4	1968–69	2003–04	3	2007–08	7	
Brantham Athletic	3	1926–27	1975–76	2	1961–62	5	
Ipswich Wanderers	3	2012–13	2021–22	2	2013–14	5	
Beccles Town	3	1919–20	2008–09	1	1923–24	4	
Sudbury Town †	2	1956–57	1986–87	6	1953–54	8	(Note: Dissolved in 1999)
Bungay Town	2	1949–50	1960–61	4	2017–18	6	
Needham Market	2	1989–90	2004–05	4	1999–00	6	
Felixstowe Town †	2	1966–67	1974–75	2	1963–64	4	(Note: Merged with Walton United to form Felixstowe & Walton United in 2000)
Framlingham College	2	1890–91	1893–94	1	1892–93	3	
Lakenheath	2	2014–15	2020–21	1	2010–11	3	
Nicholians Locomotive †	2	1976–77	1979–80	1	1974–75	3	(Note: Dissolved in the 1980s)
Achilles	2	2016–17	2018–19	0	–	2	
Ransomes Sports	2	1978–79	1980–81	0	–	2	
Haverhill Rovers	1	1996–97	1996–97	5	2001–02	6	
Newmarket Town	1	1934–35	1934–35	3	1957–58	4	
Sudbury Wanderers †	1	1990–91	1990–91	2	1988–89	3	(Note: Dissolved in 1999)
Westerfield United †	1	1985–86	1985–86	2	1984–85	3	(Note: Dissolved in 2008)
Trimley Red Devils	2	2023–24	2024–25	0	–	2	
Beccles College	1	1891–92	1891–92	1	1899–1900	2	
Cornard United	1	1988–89	1988–89	1	2018–19	2	
Framlingham Town	1	2022–23	2022–23	1	1995–96	2	
ICI Paints †	1	1967–68	1967–68	1	1971–72	2	(Note: Dissolved in 2008)
Oulton Broad	1	1965–66	1965–66	1	1966–67	2	
Cambridge Town	1	1909–10	1909–10	0	–	1	
Heath Row	1	1972–73	1972–73	0	–	1	
Suffolk District Asylum (Melton)	1	1910–11	1910–11	0	–	1	
Team Bury †	1	2009–10	2009–10	0	–	1	(Note: Dissolved in 2018)
Walsham-le-Willows	1	2005–06	2005–06	0	–	1	
Walton United †	1	1998–99	1998–99	0	–	1	(Note: Merged with Felixstowe Town to form Felixstowe & Walton United in 2000)
Waterside Works †	1	1969–70	1969–70	0	–	1	(Note: Dissolved in the 1970s)
Waveney	1	2015–16	2015–16	0	–	1	
