= Beccles Town F.C. =

Association football club in England

Coordinates: 52°27′28.51″N 1°34′15.96″E

Beccles Town
- Full name: Beccles Town Football Club
- Nickname: The Wherrymen
- Founded: 1919
- Ground: College Meadow, Beccles
- Chairman: Matt Humby
- Manager: Ryan Grimmer
- League: Anglian Combination Premier Division
- 2025–26: Anglian Combination Premier Division, 6th of 15
| Home colours | Away colours |

Beccles Town Football Club is an English football club based in Beccles, Suffolk. They are nicknamed 'The Wherrymen', because Beccles was once a busy trading town on the River Waveney. The club is affiliated to the Suffolk County FA, with their First Team playing in the Anglian Combination Premier Division, their Reserves playing out of Anglian Combination Division 2, their A Team playing out of Lowestoft and District Division 1, their Development side playing out of Lowestoft and District Division 2, their U18s playing out of the Thurlow Nunn Eastern Youth League and their Ladies side playing out of the Norfolk Women & Girls' Football League. Their home games are played at College Meadow, Ken Markland Way, Common Lane, Beccles NR34 9RH.

They also have an established Youth setup, with players playing as young as 4 right the way up till 16 in various local divisions. Beccles also boast a Walking football set up for both Males and Females. Across all sections the club has well over 500 players, making them one of the biggest in Suffolk.

== History ==
The club were established in 1919 as Beccles F.C. They won the Suffolk Senior Cup in 1919–20 and 1921–22. They won the Suffolk Junior Cup in 1939, and the Suffolk Minor Cup in 1948 and 1949. They played in the FA Cup for seven seasons in the 1950s whilst members of the Norfolk & Suffolk League, reaching the third qualifying round three times. In 1952–53 they were Norfolk & Suffolk League champions. They joined the Anglian Combination when the Norfolk & Suffolk League merged with the East Anglian League in 1964. Beccles won the Anglian Combination Division Three in 1971–72, gaining promotion to Division Two. After finishing runners-up the following season the club reached Division One. The club finished runners-up in Division One in 1976–77 and again 1985–86. During this time, Beccles entered the FA Vase four times and reached the first round in 1979. Beccles were champions of Division One in 2001–02 and won the Suffolk Senior Cup for the third time in 2009, beating Crane Sports 1–0.

== John Humby Hospital Cup ==
Every August, Beccles Town host an annual match against local teams called the John Humby Hospital Cup, with all proceeds from the match being donated to Beccles Hospital. The cup dates back as far as 1919, with the first instalment seeing Lowestoft Town defeat Beccles 2-1 to win the Cup. The fixture has taken place annually since, bar a brief pause between 2012 to 2016 due to organisational issues. A list of the winners can be found on the Beccles Town Website.

The fixture returned in 2016, with its name changing to the John Humby Hospital Cup to honour the late Chairman, John Humby to recognise his 47 year commitment to the club. Beccles faced Bungay Town FC, winning 2-0 on the day, raising some £919.35 for the local Hospital.

=== The Trophy ===
The winner's shields/band on the cup show a large gap between 1932 when the last shield was struck and 1970 where the band around the base picks up again. Who won in between these dates is not known at present but research is ongoing and indeed more information is slowly being added as sourced.

The cup was commissioned jointly by Beccles Town Council and the newly formed Beccles Town Football Club in time for the end of the 1919/20 season. Records show that the Beccles Town Mayor instructed a Mr. W. Ward to purchase a suitable cup for the competition. The cup itself is a fine piece of work and from the hallmark it is possible to ascertain that it was made by silversmiths, James Dixon & Sons of Sheffield in 1912. The front of the cup depicts the ancient town seal of Beccles from 1584 showing the town gaol (jail) and three sheep in the town pound which still exists in Common Lane North. This seal also appears embroidered into a unidentified and undated cotton patch which is in our archive collection and shown below.

The most recent encounter saw Beccles defeat Kirkley & Pakefield F.C 3-0 to retain the Cup for another season.

== Honours ==
- Norfolk & Suffolk League
  - Champions 1952–53
- Anglian Combination
  - Division One champions 2001–02
  - Division Three champions 1971–72
  - Division One Runners-Up 2016-17
- Suffolk Senior Cup
  - Winners 1919–20, 1921–22, 2008–09
- Suffolk Junior Cup
  - Winners 1938–39
- Suffolk Minor Cup
  - Winners 1947–48, 1948–49

== Records ==
- Best FA Cup performance: Third qualifying round, 1952–53, 1954–55, 1955–56
- Best FA Vase performance: First round, 1978–79
