= Lakenheath F.C. =

Association football club in England

Coordinates: 52.418133°N 0.52176891°E

Lakenheath
- Full name: Lakenheath Football Club
- Nickname: The Heath
- Founded: 1907
- Ground: The Nest, Lakenheath
- Capacity: 2,000 (195 seated)
- Chairman: Steven Peasey
- Manager: Steven Holder
- League: Eastern Counties League Premier Division
- 2024–25: Eastern Counties League Premier Division, 18th of 20
Home colours	Away colours

Lakenheath Football Club is a football club based in Lakenheath, Suffolk, England. They are currently members of the Eastern Counties League Premier Division and play at the Nest.

== History ==
The club was established around the 1907–08 season. They played in the Ouse Valley League, before joining the Essex and Suffolk Border League. In 1936–37 the club won the Suffolk Junior Cup, beating Life Brigade 1–0 in a replay. They were Premier Division runners-up in 1947–48 and League Cup finalists in 1957–58. The club subsequently transferred to the Norfolk & Suffolk League.

In 1964 the Norfolk & Suffolk League merged with the East Anglian League to form the Anglian Combination, with Lakenheath placed in Section D of the new league. They were runners-up in Division Three in 1968–69 and finished second in Division Two in 1974–75, a season in which they also won the Suffolk Junior Cup for a second time. In 1981–82 they were runners-up in Division One, earning promotion to the Premier Division. However, the following season saw them finish bottom of the Premier Division, resulting in relegation back to Division One. The club finished bottom of Division One in 1985–86 and were relegated to Division Two.

In the late 1990s Lakenheath transferred to the Cambridgeshire County League. They were champions of Senior Division A in 2007–08, earning promotion to the Premier Division. The following season saw them finish as runners-up in the Premier Division. In 2010–11 the club won the Premier Division title. They were Premier Division runners-up the following season, and again in 2014–15, a season that also saw the club win the Suffolk Senior Cup, beating Ipswich Valley Rangers 7–0 in the final.

Despite finishing only eighth in the Cambridgeshire County League Premier Division in 2017–18, Lakenheath were promoted to Division One North of the Eastern Counties League. In 2019–20 the club were second in the league when it was abandoned in March due to the COVID-19 pandemic. However, in 2021 the club were promoted to the Premier Division based on their results in the abandoned 2019–20 and 2020–21 seasons. They also won the Suffolk Senior Cup for a second time in 2020–21, defeating Bildeston Rangers 2–0 in the final. In 2022–23 Lakenheath won the League Cup, beating Ipswich Wanderers 7–6 on penalties after the final ended in a 0–0 draw.

== Ground ==
The club has played at several grounds, including one near the British Legion site on the High Street. In the 1940s they moved to the Nest, a former chalk quarry that was leased to the club by Charlton Briscoe. A brick stand was built in the mid-1950s and the club bought the ground from Briscoe's son in the early 1960s.

== Staff ==
Position	Name
Chairman	Steven Peasey
Manager	Steven Holder
Assistant manager	Alan Gyte
Coach	Craig Nurse

== Honours ==
- Eastern Counties League
  - League Cup winners 2022–23
- Cambridgeshire County League
  - Premier Division champions 2010–11
  - Senior Division A champions 2007–08
- Suffolk Senior Cup
  - Winners 2014–15, 2020–21
- Suffolk Junior Cup
  - Winners 1936–37, 1974–75

== Records ==
- Best FA Cup performance: Preliminary round, 2021–22
- Best FA Vase performance: Fourth round, 2021–22
