= Beccles Caxton F.C. =

Beccles Caxton
- Full name: Beccles Caxton Football Club
- Founded: 1880
- Ground: Caxton Meadow, Beccles
- League: Anglian Combination Division Two
- 2021-22: Anglian Combination Division Two 10th of 14

Beccles Caxton Football Club is an English football club based in Beccles, Suffolk. The club have been members of the Anglian Combination since the league's foundation in 1964 and are currently in Division Two after being promoted from Division Three in 2019.

They play an annual match against Beccles Town called the Hospital Cup. All proceeds from the match are donated to Beccles Hospital.

== Honours ==
- Anglian Combination

Division Four Champions 1987-88 & 2005-06
