= Walsham-le-Willows F.C. =

Association football club in England

Coordinates: 52°18′28.21″N 0°55′51.51″E

Walsham-le-Willows
- Full name: Walsham-le-Willows Football Club
- Nickname: The Willows
- Founded: 1890
- Ground: Summer Road, Walsham le Willows
- Chairman: Keith Mills
- Manager: Andy Reynolds
- League: Eastern Counties League Premier Division
- 2025–26: Eastern Counties League Premier Division, 12th of 18
Home colours	Away colours

Walsham-le-Willows Football Club is a football club based in the village of Walsham le Willows in Suffolk, England. The club are currently members of the Eastern Counties League Premier Division and play at Summer Road. The club is affiliated to the Suffolk County FA.

== History ==
Walsham-le-Willows F.C. was founded around 1890, and played at the Summer Road sports ground where there was a pavilion with a thatched roof. During World War II, the ground was ploughed up to grow food and was not returned to sports use until 1951.

The club was a founder member of the St. Edmundsbury Football League in 1907 and won the Suffolk Junior Cup in 1988, 1989 and 1990. After winning several league titles, the club switched to the Suffolk and Ipswich League in 1989. It won the Senior Division in 2001–02 and again in 2002–03. In the following season, the club finished second, but earned promotion to Division One of the Eastern Counties League.

The club finished fourth in their first season in the division, narrowly missing out on promotion. They also reached the final of the Suffolk Senior Cup, losing 2–1 to Needham Market. The following season, they reached the final again, this time beating Capel Plough 4–3 after extra time. In 2006–07 the club won Division One, and were promoted to the Premier Division.

In 2024–25 Walsham-le-Willows finished fifth in the Premier Division, qualifying for the promotion play-offs. After beating Fakenham Town 1–0 in the semi-finals, they lost 2–1 to Downham Town in the final.

== Ground ==
The club play at Summer Road, a sports ground shared with Walsham-le-Willows Cricket Club and Walsham-le-Willows Bowls Club. The ground is managed by Walsham-le-Willows Sports Club.

== Honours ==
- Eastern Counties League
  - Division One champions 2006–07
- Suffolk & Ipswich League
  - Senior Division champions 2001–02, 2002–03
  - League Cup winners 1998–99, 1999–2000, 2001–02
- Suffolk Senior Cup
  - Winners 2005–06
- Suffolk Junior Cup
  - Winners 1987–88, 1988–89, 1989–90

== Records ==
- Best FA Cup performance: Preliminary round, 2007–08, 2008–09, 2009–10, 2011–12, 2021–22, 2025–26
- Best FA Vase performance: Fourth round, 2023–24, 2024–25

== See also ==
- Walsham-le-Willows F.C. players
