= Woodbridge Town F.C. =

Association football club in England

Coordinates: 52°05′07.97″N 1°17′27.46″E

Woodbridge Town
- Full name: Woodbridge Town Football Club
- Nickname: The Woodpeckers
- Founded: 23 July 1885
- Ground: Notcutts Park, Woodbridge
- Capacity: 3,000 (50 seated)
- Chairman: David Cotton
- Manager: Liam Scopes
- League: Eastern Counties League Premier Division
- 2025–26: Eastern Counties League Premier Division, 11th of 18
Home colours	Away colours

Woodbridge Town Football Club is a football club based in Woodbridge, Suffolk, England. They are currently members of the Eastern Counties League Premier Division and play at Notcutts Park.

== History ==
The club was formed at a meeting held on 23 July 1885. Their first match was against St Helens of Ipswich on 7 November, which resulted in a 10–0 win. The Suffolk County Football Association was formed in the same year and the club were a founder member. They entered the inaugural Suffolk Senior Cup in 1885–86 and went on to reach the final against Ipswich Town. The first two matches ended in 2–2 and 0–0 draws, with Woodbridge winning the second replay 3–1. After becoming Woodbridge Old St Mary's, the club were founder members of the Ipswich & District League in 1896, joining Division Two. The 1896–97 season saw them win the Suffolk Junior Cup and finish as runners-up in Division Two, earning promotion to Division One. The club went on to win the Division One title in 1898–99, after which they were renamed Woodbridge Town.

Although Woodbridge withdrew from the league in 1901, the club rejoined a year later and were placed in Division Two. They were Division Two champions in 1903–04 and were promoted to Division One. The 1905–06 season saw the club finish bottom of Division One, after which they withdrew from the league again. Returning to Division Two in 1907–08, the club were runners-up in the division in their first season back. The following season saw them win three competitions; the club entered a team into the new Woodbridge & District League and were its inaugural champions. In the Suffolk Junior Cup, they reached the final and defeated RFA Ipswich 2–1 to win the competition, while in Division Two the club won all fifteen league matches, securing the title and earning promotion to Division One. Although they finished bottom of Division One in 1909–10, they were not relegated as Brantham Athletic withdrew from the league. They finished bottom of Division One again in 1911–12, but again avoided being relegated after several other clubs left the league to form a breakaway version. Woodbridge went on to win the Division One title in 1912–13. However, after winning the title, the club switched to the breakaway league for the 1913–14 season. The league was reunited for the 1914–15 season, with Woodbridge placed in Division One. However, the outbreak of World War I led to the league being abandoned in September 1914.

Following the war the club were renamed Woodbridge Comrades. After missing its first season, the club returned to the Ipswich & District League in 1920 and were placed in Division Two A. They were runners-up in the division in 1920–21, after which the club were transferred to Division Two B. They were Division Two B champions in 1921–22, losing the subsequent sectional final against Division Two A champions St Mary Elms Old Boys 4–2. After retaining the Division Two B title the following season, the club lost the sectional final against Manganese Bronze 2–1. In 1923 they reverted to the Woodbridge Town name. The club were runners-up in Division Two B in 1923–24, and again the following season. They were Division Two B champions in 1925–26, remaining unbeaten in the league, and after defeating Manningtree 2–0 in the sectional final, were promoted to Division One. The club won the Junior Cup again in 1926–27, beating Southwold Town 4–2. The following season saw them finish as runners-up in Division One. The club finished bottom of Division One in 1929–30 but were not relegated as the division was expanded by two clubs. They finished bottom again in 1931–32, but avoided relegation as the division was expanded again. However, after finishing bottom of Division One again in 1933–34, the club opted to return to junior football and were placed in Division Two B. were relegated to Division Two B. Another rename saw them become Woodbridge United in 1936.

Woodbridge did not return for the 1945–46 season, the first after World War II. They entered Division Three for the 1946–47 season, having been renamed Woodbridge Athletic that year. Amid a significant expansion of the league, the club were placed in Division Two B for the 1947–48 season, during which they reverted to the Town name. However, the Woodbridge Athletic name was restored in 1948. Despite having finished fifth in Division Two B in 1947–48, the club were elected to an expanded Division One. Division One was renamed the Premier Division in 1950. Woodbridge finished bottom of the Premier Division in 1955–56 but were re-elected to the division. However, after finishing bottom of the division again the following season, conceding an average of more than five goals a game, the club were due to be relegated to Division One, but instead withdrew from the league. They returned to the league in 1961 and were allowed to re-enter Division One, but went on to finish bottom of the division, and were relegated to Division Two A. The club were Division Two A runners-up in 1968–69 and were promoted to Division One, after which they returned to the Woodbridge Town name.

Woodbridge won the Division One title in 1970–71 without losing a match, earning promotion to the Premier Division. The season also saw them win the Suffolk Junior Cup, beating Lake Lothing 2–1 in the final. They won the Suffolk Senior Cup in 1977–78, beating Crane Sports 2–1 in the final. In 1978 the league was renamed the Suffolk & Ipswich League and the Premier Division became the Senior Division. The club were relegated from the Senior Division in 1982–83 after finishing second-from-bottom of the division, but returned to the Senior Division after winning the Division One title and Suffolk Junior Cup in 1986–87. They won the Senior Division title in 1988–89, earning promotion to Division One of the Eastern Counties League.

Woodbridge won the Suffolk Senior Cup for a third time in 1992–93, beating Stonham Aspal 5–2 in the final. They retained the cup the following year with a 4–0 win over Saxmundham Sports, and were also runners-up in Division One, resulting in promotion to the Premier Division. After finishing bottom of the Premier Division in 2013–14 the club were relegated to Division One. They won the Suffolk Senior Cup again in 2017–18 with a 3–0 win over Bungay Town in the final. The club were Division One champions in 2017–18 and were promoted back to the Premier Division. The following season saw them finish second in the Premier Division.

== Ground ==
Woodbridge initially played on a pitch at Farlingaye Hall. After changing their name from Woodbridge Old St Marys to Woodbridge Town in 1899, the club were forced to leave their Barrack Farm ground. They became a nomadic club, playing at five different grounds during the 1950s and 1960s. By the late 1980s the club were playing at Kingston Field. In September 1990 they moved to Notcutts Park, which was opened with a friendly match against Arsenal.

== Honours ==
- Eastern Counties League
  - Division One champions 2017–18
  - League Cup winners 1993–94, 1997–98
- Suffolk & Ipswich League
  - Champions 1898–99, 1912–13, 1988–89
  - Division One champions 1970–71, 1986–87
  - Division Two champions 1903–04, 1908–09
  - Division Two B champions 1921–22, 1922–23, 1925–26
  - League Cup winners 1978–79
- Woodbridge & District League
  - Champions 1908–09
- Suffolk Senior Cup
  - Winners 1885–86, 1977–78, 1992–93, 1993–94, 2017–18
- Suffolk Junior Cup
  - Winners 1896–97, 1908–09, 1926–27, 1970–71, 1986–87

== Records ==
- Best FA Cup performance: Third qualifying round, 1997–98, 2000–01
- Best FA Vase performance: Quarter-finals, 1998–99
- Record attendance: 3,000 vs Arsenal, friendly match, 2 October 1990

== See also ==
- Woodbridge Town F.C. players
- Woodbridge Town F.C. managers
