= Sudbury Wanderers F.C. =

Sudbury Wanderers
- Full name: Sudbury Wanderers Football Club
- Nickname: Wanderers
- Founded: 1958
- Dissolved: 1999
- Ground: King's Marsh, Sudbury
Home colours

Sudbury Wanderers was an English football club based in Sudbury, Suffolk. Established in 1958, the club merged with Sudbury Town in 1999 to form AFC Sudbury.

== History ==
The club was established in June 1958 following a meeting in the town's Black Horse pub. The founders were former members of Sudbury Youth Club who had been playing in the Halstead & District League, but had been told that they were too old to still be members. The club also joined the Halstead & District League and played in yellow and blue after their first kit was donated by Sudbury Town. They won the league and league cup double during the first season and were promoted to the Essex & Suffolk Border League. In 1966–67, they were Division One champions, but were denied promotion due to a lack of facilities at their home ground.

They were finally promoted to the Premier Division in 1977 after moving to a new ground in 1976 and then winning the Division One title. In 1989–90 they won the Premier Division for the first time. The following season they won the Suffolk Senior Cup and retained the title, earning promotion to Division One of the Eastern Counties League.

Their second season in the ECL saw the club win Division One, setting records for the longest unbeaten run at the start of a season (17 matches), most consecutive victories (13) and biggest away win (11–0 at Swaffham Town). In 1997–98 they met neighbours Sudbury Town in the league for the first time after they dropped out of the Southern League, and also won the Suffolk Premier Cup. The following season they won the league cup with a record 7–2 win over Felixstowe Port & Town. On 1 June 1999 the club merged with Sudbury Town to form AFC Sudbury. The new club plays at Wanderers' old ground.

== Ground ==
The club initially played on People's Park, before moving to the Kings Marsh ground on Brundon Lane in 1976. Their record attendance was 892 for an FA Vase sixth round match on 28 February 1998.

== Club honours ==
- Eastern Counties League
  - Division One champions 1992–93
  - League Cup winners 1998–99
- Essex & Suffolk Border League
  - Premier Division champions 1989–90, 1990–91
  - Division One champions 1966–67, 1976–77
- Halstead & District League
  - Champions 1958–59
  - League Cup winners 1958–59
- Suffolk Premier Cup
  - Winners 1997–98
- Suffolk Senior Cup
- Winners – 1990–91

== Club records ==
- Best league position: Fourth in the Eastern Counties League Premier Division, 1997–98
- Best FA Vase performance: Quarter-finals, 1997–98
- Best FA Cup performance: Fourth qualifying round 1995–96
