= Brantham Athletic F.C. =

Association football club in England

Coordinates: 51°57′27.96″N 1°03′32.24″E

Brantham Athletic
- Full name: Brantham Athletic Football Club
- Nickname: The Blue Imps
- Founded: 1887
- Ground: Brantham Leisure Centre, Brantham
- Capacity: 1,200 (200 seated)
- Chairman: Peter Crowhurst
- Manager: Michael Brothers
- League: Eastern Counties League Premier Division
- 2025–26: Isthmian League North Division, 22nd of 22 (relegated)
- Website: branthamathletic.com
Home colours	Away colours

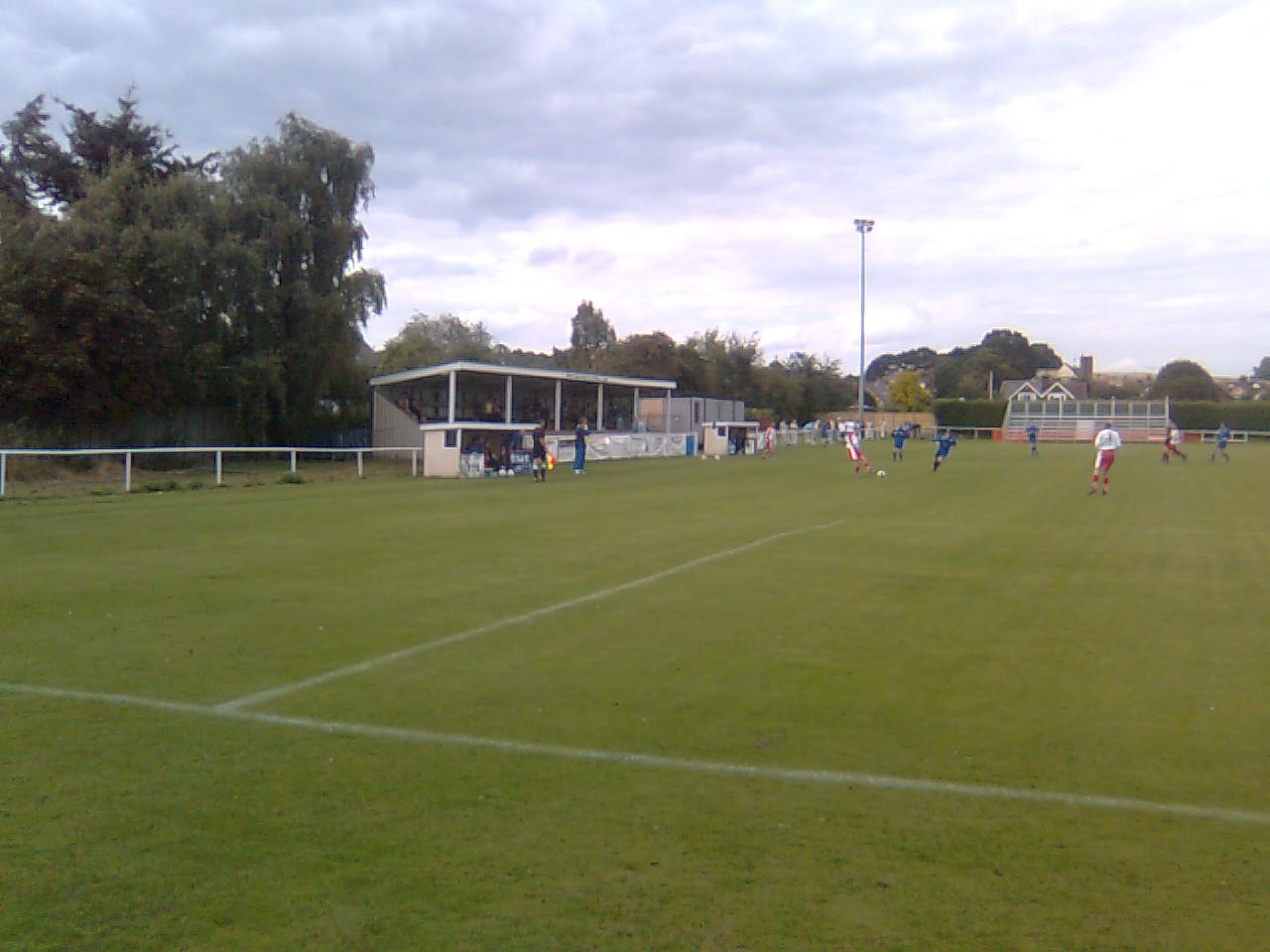
Brantham's home ground

Brantham Athletic Football Club is a football club based in Brantham, Suffolk, England. They are currently members of the Eastern Counties League Premier Division and play at Brantham Leisure Centre.

== History ==
The club was established in 1887 by workers from the British Xylonite factory under the name Brantham Works. Their first match was a 3–0 defeat to St Clements Institute from Ipswich on 28 January 1888. The club were founder members of the Ipswich & District League in 1896, joining Division One. Despite finishing as Division One runners-up, they left the league at the end of its inaugural season. The club returned to Division Two of the league in 1898 and won the division at the first attempt, as well as sharing the Suffolk Junior Cup. Although they were promoted to Division One, they withdrew midway from the league through the following season.

The club adopted the name Brantham Crown for some time and returned to Division One of the Ipswich & District League in 1905. In 1906 they reverted to their original name, and the following year left the Ipswich & District League again to join Division Two of the South East Anglian League. They returned to Division One of the Ipswich & District League for the 1908–09 season, but left again in 1910 to join the Harwich & District League. After playing in it for a single season they joined the Essex & Suffolk Border League, before switching back to Division Two of the FA version of the Ipswich & District League in 1912 (the league had split into AFA- and FA-aligned versions that year), also playing in Division Two of the (now renamed) East Anglian League, winning both in 1913–14. They were promoted to Division One of a reunited Ipswich & District League for the 1914–15 season, but following the outbreak of World War I the league was abandoned in September 1914.

After the war Brantham re-entered Division One. In 1924–25 the club reached the final of the Suffolk Senior Cup, which they lost 1–0 to Kirkley. Shortly before the cup final the club had been due to play their final league match against RAF Felixstowe, which would decide the league title. However, the match was left unplayed and the league awarded the title to RAF Felixstowe. Brantham then left the league (though their 'A' team remained in Division Three A), returning to the Essex & Suffolk Border League. The club won the Senior Cup in 1926–27 with a 3–0 win over Lowestoft Town in the final. After finishing bottom of the Essex & Suffolk Border League in 1931–32 they returned to Division One of the Ipswich & District League. The club were runners-up in Division One in 1936–37.

Following World War II Brantham rejoined the Essex & Suffolk Border League, although they also played in Division One of the Ipswich & District League between 1947 and 1950. They won the Essex & Suffolk Border League League Cup in 1948–49, beating Colchester United 4–0 in the final. The club won the Senior Cup for a second time in 1959–60, defeating Christchurch Athletic 3–2. In 1972–73 they won the Essex & Suffolk Border League and retained the title the following season. In 1975–76 they won the league again, also winning the League Cup (with a 1–0 win against Wivenhoe Town after extra time) and the Senior Cup. A league and League Cup double was repeated the following season, with the club beating Wivenhoe 2–0 in the cup final.

Brantham applied to join the Eastern Counties League in 1977, but were rejected as the ECL secretary claimed that they would not "attract people to watch them in other parts of the region". However, the following year they were successful and were admitted to the league. In 1983–84 the club won the Suffolk Premier Cup, beating Lowestoft Town 2–0 in the final. When the Eastern Counties League gained a second tier in 1988, the club was placed in the Premier Division. However, they were relegated to Division One at the end of the 1992–93 season after finishing second-from-bottom of the Premier Division. In 1994–96 the club finished second-from-bottom of Division One and were relegated to the Senior Division of the Suffolk & Ipswich League (the renamed Ipswich & District League).

Suffering from financial problems, Brantham merged with Stutton to become Brantham & Stutton United. After winning the League Cup in 1996–97, the club reverted to their previous name in 1998. They were relegated to Division One at the end of the 1999–2000 season, and despite making an immediate return to the Senior Division, they were relegated again the following season. In 2004–05 the club were runners-up in Division One and were promoted to the Senior Division. They won the Senior Division title in 2007–08 and were promoted back to Division One of the Eastern Counties League. After finishing third in Division One in 2009–10 the club were promoted to the Premier Division. They won the League Cup in 2017–18, defeating Thetford Town 4–2 in the final.

In 2024–25 Brantham were Premier Division champions, earning promotion to the North Division of the Isthmian League.

== Other teams ==
The club's Sunday league side played in the Ipswich Sunday League, and reached the FA Sunday Cup semi-final in 2008. The women's team won the Suffolk Women's and Girls League and League Cup in 2022–23.

== Honours ==
- Eastern Counties League
  - Premier Division champions 2024-25
  - League Cup winners 2017–18
- Suffolk & Ipswich League
  - Senior Division champions 2007–08
  - Division Two (FA) champions 1913–14
  - League Cup winners 1996–97
- Essex & Suffolk Border League
  - Champions 1972–73, 1973–74, 1975–76, 1976–77
  - League Cup winners 1948–49, 1975–76, 1976–77,
- Suffolk Premier Cup
  - Winners 1983–84
- Suffolk Senior Cup
  - Winners 1926–27, 1959–60, 1975–76

== Records ==
- Best FA Cup performance: Second qualifying round, 2018–19, 2020–21
- Best FA Trophy performance: Preliminary round, 2025–26
- Best FA Vase performance: Fifth round, 1982–83, 2012–13
- Record attendance: 1,700 vs VS Rugby, FA Vase fifth round, 1982–83

== See also ==
- Brantham Athletic F.C. players
- Brantham Athletic F.C. managers
