= Norfolk & Suffolk League =

- Founded: 1897
- Folded: 1964
- Country: England
- Region: East Anglia
- Last champions: CNS Old Boy's Union (1963–64)
- Most championships: King's Lynn and Lowestoft Town (8 titles each)

The Norfolk & Suffolk League was a football league covering the counties of Norfolk and Suffolk in England.

== History ==
The league was established in 1897, starting with six clubs, Beccles Caxton, Great Yarmouth Town, Kirkley, Lowestoft Town, Lynn Town and Norwich CEYMS. Lowestoft won the inaugural league title and went on to win six of the first seven championships. By the early 1900s it had attracted the two biggest clubs in the region, Ipswich Town and Norwich City. The league gradually expanded, reaching 14 clubs in the 1920s and after a slight contraction, losing many of its better clubs to the newly established Eastern Counties League, it had sixteen members by the late 1930s. During the late 1950s it had 18 members. However, it had lost most of the Suffolk-based clubs and in 1964 the league merged with the East Anglian League to form the Anglian Combination.

== Champions ==
Season	Champions
1897–98	Lowestoft Town
1898–99	Lowestoft Town
1899–1900	Norwich CEYMS
1900–01	Lowestoft Town
1901–02	Lowestoft Town
1902–03	Lowestoft Town
1903–04	Lowestoft Town
1904–05	Norwich City
1905–06	Lynn Town
1906–07	Norwich CEYMS
1907–08	Lynn Town
1908–09	Cromer
1909–10	Lynn Town
1910–11	Norwich CEYMS
1911–12	16th Lancers
1912–13	Lynn Town
1913–14	Great Yarmouth Town
1919–20	Norwich City Reserves
1920–21	Gorleston
1921–22	Lynn Town
1922–23	Lynn Town
1923–24	Lynn Town
1924–25	Lynn Town
1925–26	Gorleston
1926–27	Great Yarmouth Town
1927–28	Great Yarmouth Town
1928–29	Lowestoft Town
1929–30	Gorleston
1930–31	Lowestoft Town
1931–32	Gorleston
1932–33	Gorleston
1933–34	Gorleston
1934–35	Gorleston
1935–36	Norwich CEYMS
1936–37	Norwich City 'A'
1937–38	Eastern Coachworks
1938–39	Holt United
1946–47	Bungay Town
1947–48	Bungay Town
1948–49	Bungay Town
1949–50	Gothic
1950–51	Gothic
1951–52	Bungay Town
1952–53	Beccles Town
1953–54	North Walsham Town
1954–55	Thetford Town
1955–56	Gothic
1956–57	Gothic
1957–58	Sheringham
1958–59	Gothic
1959–60	CNS Old Boy's Union
1960–61	Gothic
1961–62	Gothic
1962–63	CNS Old Boy's Union
1963–64	CNS Old Boy's Union

== Member clubs ==
Member clubs during the league's existence included:

- 12th Lancers
- 16th Lancers
- Beccles Caxton
- Beccles Town
- Boulton & Paul
- Bungay Town
- Bury Town
- CNS Old Boy's Union
- Carrow Works
- City Wanderers
- Cromer
- Dereham Town
- Diss Town
- Eastern Coachworks
- Eastern Counties United
- Electricity Works
- Fakenham Town
- Frosts Athletic
- Gorleston
- Gothic
- Great Yarmouth Town
- Holt United
- Ipswich Town
- King's Lynn
- Kirkley
- Lakenheath
- Leiston
- Lowestoft Town
- Mortons Athletic
- North Walsham Athletic
- North Walsham Town
- Norwich CEYMS
- Norwich City
- Norwich City 'A'
- Norwich Reserves
- Norwich Electricity
- Norwich Federation
- Norwich St Barnabas
- Norwich St James
- Norwich YMCA
- RAF Bircham Newton
- RAF Feltwell
- RAF Marham
- Reepham Town
- Sheringham
- Sprowston Athletic
- Swaffham Town
- Thetford Recreation
- Thetford Town
- Thorpe Village
- Wymondham Town
