= Bury Town F.C. =

Association football club in England

Coordinates: 52°14′56″N 0°43′1″E

Bury Town
- Full name: Bury Town Football Club
- Nickname: The Blues
- Founded: 1872
- Ground: Ram Meadow, Bury St Edmunds
- Capacity: 3,500 (300 seated)
- Chairman: Russell Ward
- Manager: Cole Skuse
- League: Southern League Premier Division Central
- 2025–26: Southern League Premier Division Central, 13th of 22
- Website: burytownfc.co.uk
Home colours	Away colours

Bury Town Football Club is a semi-professional football club, based in Bury St Edmunds, Suffolk, England. The club are currently members of the Southern League Premier Division Central and play at Ram Meadow.

== History ==
=== Early history ===
The club was established by William Lake at a meeting in the Suffolk Hotel in 1872. Initially named Bury St Edmunds Football Club, the first committee of the club elected to choose royal blue as the club's colours. In 1885 they were one of eleven founder members of the Suffolk FA and voted to change their name to Bury Town. In 1895 the club's name reverted to Bury St Edmunds.

The club joined the Norfolk & Suffolk League in 1899, but withdrew midway through the 1901–02 season. They subsequently became members of the South East Anglian League in 1904 and finished bottom of the league in 1905–06. In 1908 the club merged with Bury Alexandra, and were renamed Bury United, before reverting back to Bury Town in 1923. They rejoined the Norfolk & Suffolk League in 1920, leaving again in 1929 and rejoining again in 1932. During this time they also played in the Essex & Suffolk Border League. In 1935 the club moved into senior football by becoming founder members of the Eastern Counties League. They gained their first honour when they won the Suffolk Senior Cup in 1936–37, a trophy they retained for the next two seasons. 1937–38 saw the club achieve its best pre-war league position of runners-up, before the competition was suspended due to the outbreak of World War II. Bury Town won the Suffolk Senior Cup for the fourth time in 1945 before resuming league action in 1946.

=== Post-war ===
In 1958–59 Bury Town became the first ever winners of the Suffolk Premier Cup and went on to retain the trophy for the next three seasons. The club won the Eastern Counties League Cup for the first time in 1961–62 and then in 1963–64 they won the Eastern Counties League Championship for the only time in its history, recording a "treble" by retaining the League Cup and winning the Suffolk Premier Cup for the fifth time. This success prompted the club to join the Metropolitan League in 1964 when once again, they won the Suffolk Premier Cup. During the 1965–66 campaign, Bury Town recorded yet another "treble", winning the Metropolitan League Championship, the Metropolitan League Professional Cup and for the seventh time, the Suffolk Premier Cup. In 1967–68 the Blues won the Metropolitan League Cup for the only time and finished runners-up in the league.

The Metropolitan League title was won for the second and final time in 1968–69 when the club reached the first round proper of the FA Cup for the first time in their history; 3,000 spectators saw the Blues hold Third Division leaders Bournemouth & Boscombe Athletic to a goalless home draw at King's Road, in a match covered by Anglia Television, but the replay at Dean Court was lost 3–0. The 1970–71 season was the club's last in the Metropolitan League when they finished as runners-up and also lifted the Suffolk Premier Cup for the eighth occasion. In 1971 the club switched to the Southern League, but poor results prompted a return to the Eastern Counties League in 1976. A year later they won the Suffolk Premier Cup again.

=== 1980s to present ===
In 1986–87, which proved to be Bury Town's last season in the Eastern Counties League, the club enjoyed another good run in the FA Cup, reaching the fourth qualifying round. The Blues were drawn away to Conference leaders Enfield and forced a 0–0 draw before 842 spectators. A record crowd of over 2,500 saw the visitors win the replay at Ram Meadow. In 1987 Bury rejoined the Southern League and experienced mixed fortunes in the Southern Division. The 1995–96 season saw the club accepting a transfer across to the Midland Division. After completion of only one season in the Midland Division, Bury Town were relegated back to the Eastern Counties League. Despite relegation the club won the Suffolk Premier Cup, beating Woodbridge Town in the final.

Bury saw little success until the 2004–05 season with the club finishing second in the league and winning the Westwood Shield, as well as reaching the quarter-finals of the FA Vase for the second time. The following season saw the club finish second in the league again, allowing them promotion to Division One North of the Isthmian League, as well as reaching the semi-final of the FA Vase. Two seasons later the club were transferred into Division One Midlands of the Southern League as part of a geographical reorganisation. In the same season they reached the first round proper of the FA Cup for the first time in forty years, losing 4–2 away to Conference North club Alfreton Town. The 2009–10 season ended with the club winning 3–0 on the final day of the season to claim the title, earning promotion to the seventh level of English football, where they were placed in the Isthmian League Premier Division. The following season they won the Premier Cup for a tenth time, defeating Needham Market 2–0 in the final, and also finished third in the league, qualifying for the play-offs, where they lost 2–1 at home to Lowestoft Town. In 2011–12 the club won the Isthmian League Cup. After finishing bottom of the Premier Division in 2014–15 season they were relegated to Division One North.

In 2023–24 Bury were runners-up in the renamed North Division but were beaten 3–1 by Brentwood Town in the play-off semi-finals. The following season saw the club finish third in the division, before going onto beat Waltham Abbey 4–0 in the play-off semi-finals and then Brightlingsea Regent 1–0 in the final to earn promotion to the Premier Division Central of the Southern League.

== Ground ==
The club took up residence at King's Road, also known as the Cemetery Road ground, in 1888. It became the first football ground in East Anglia to operate floodlights, when on 12 January 1953, Bury played their first ever floodlit game against Cambridge City in front of 2,105 spectators. A total of 14 bulbs of 1,500 watts were used, with the lights financed by the Bury Town Supporters Club. The club's last match at King's Road was played on 30 April 1976, a 2–2 draw against a West Ham United team with 1,750 in attendance; the land on which the ground was located was required to build a new road. After a year at a temporary ground, the club moved to their current Ram Meadow ground in 1977. All four sides of the ground have covered areas for spectators, with 300 seats in two stands either side of the pitch and terracing behind both goals.

== Honours ==
- Isthmian League
  - League Cup winners 2011–12
- Southern League
  - Division One Midlands champions 2009–10
- Eastern Counties League
  - Champions 1963–64
  - League Cup winners 1961–62, 1963–64
- Metropolitan League
  - Champions 1965–66, 1968–69
  - League Cup winners 1967–68
  - Professional Cup winners 1965–66
- Suffolk Premier Cup
  - Winners 1958–59, 1959–60, 1960–61, 1961–62, 1963–64, 1964–65, 1965-66, 1970–71, 1977–78, 1995–96, 2010–11, 2012–13, 2013–14
- Suffolk Senior Cup
  - Winners 1936–37, 1937–38, 1938–39, 1944–45, 1984–85

== Records ==
- Best FA Cup performance: First round, 1968–69, 2008–09
- Best FA Trophy performance: Second round, 1970–71
- Best FA Vase performance: Semi-finals, 2005–06
- Record attendance:
  - At King's Road: 4,343 vs Cambridge Town, FA Cup first qualifying round, 1949
  - At Ram Meadow: 2,500 vs Enfield, FA Cup fourth qualifying round, 1986
- Most appearances: Dick Rayner – 610 appearances in 12 seasons
- Most goals: Doug Tooley – 251 goals in 9 seasons
- Record transfer fee received: £5,500 for Simon Milton from Ipswich Town
- Record transfer fee paid: £1,500 for Mitchel Springett to Chelmsford City

== See also ==
- Bury Town F.C. players
- Bury Town F.C. managers
