= Crane Sports F.C. =

Association football club in England

Coordinates: 52.075844°N 1.179664°E

Crane Sports
- Full name: Crane Sports Football Club
- Dissolved: 2021
- Ground: Greshams Sports Ground, Ipswich

Crane Sports Football Club were a football club based in Ipswich, Suffolk, England.

== History ==
Initially known as Crane & Bennett, the club joined the Ipswich & District League in 1926, entering Division Three Section C. They finished joint top the division in their first season in the league, going on to beat Needham Market 3–0 in a replay of a title-deciding play-off after the initial match had ended 2–2. However, they were not promoted. The club were moved to Section A for the 1928–29 season, and finished as runners-up. They were moved again, to Section B, for the 1930~31 season and went on to win the title. However, after failing to be elected to Division Two, the club resigned from the league.

The club returned to the league as 'Cranes' in 1934, when they were elected to Section B of Division Two. Following World War II they did not return to the league when it restarted in 1945. However, the club rejoined in 1947, entering Division One. After finishing bottom of the division in 1947–48 they sat out the 1948–49 season, but returned to Division One for the 1949–50 season. Division One was renamed the Premier Division the following season. In 1952–53 the club finished bottom of the Premier Division, and were relegated to Division One. They were runners-up in Division One for the next two seasons, but were not promoted. The club were runners-up again in 1960–61 but were again not promoted. However, after finishing fourth in Division One in 1965–66 they were promoted back to the Premier Division. In 1969–70 the club finished bottom of the Premier Division, but were not relegated.

In 1970–71 Cranes won the Suffolk Senior Cup, beating Needham Market 3–1 in the final. They became Crane Sports for the 1971–72 season and won the Suffolk Senior Cup again in 1973–74 with a 1–0 win over Heath Row. The following season saw them win the Premier Division title, winning 33 of their 34 matches and drawing the other. In 1978 the league was renamed the Suffolk & Ipswich League and the Premier Division became the Senior Division. They won the Senior Cup again in 1981–82, beating Wickham Market in the final. Another Senior Cup was claimed in 1983–84. They also entered the FA Vase for three seasons during the 1980s, reaching the second round in 1983–84 after defeating Arlesey Town in what the Ipswich Evening Star described 25 years later as "memorable matches".

After finishing second-from-bottom of the (renamed) Senior Division in 1985–86, Crane were relegated to Division One. They finished second-from-bottom of Division One in 1993–94, and were relegated to Division Two. After another relegation the club won Division Three in 1998–99 and Division One in 2001–02 to return to the Senior Division. In 2004–05 they won the League Cup for the first time. They won the Senior Division title in 2014–15, retaining the title the following season.

In April 2021 Crane Sports announced they would be folding, due to "commercial, financial and logistical factors".

== Ground ==
From the early 1960s to the 1980s, the club was the regular venue for the Suffolk county hockey team's matches. According to The Times' correspondent, it had "a well-kept pitch with good drainage and the amenities are superb. Suffolk have been using this ground for 19 years and it is believed to be lucky for them". After the ground was taken over by Ipswich Town in 1998, the club had to share facilities; they moved to their current home, Greshams Sports Ground, before the 2010–11 season.

Between 1966 and 1998, the club played host to an annual seven-a-side invitational football tournament, the "Crane Summer Sevens", to be revived in 2011. Among the early winners were Ipswich Town, whose team included future England national team captain Mick Mills.

== Honours ==
- Suffolk & Ipswich League
  - Senior Division champions 1974–75, 2014–15, 2015–16, 2018–19
  - Division One champions 2001–02
  - Division Three champions 1998–99
  - Division Three Section B champions 1930–35
  - Division Three Section C champions 1926–27
  - League Cup winners 2004–05 2010–11, 2012–13, 2017–18
- Suffolk Senior Cup
  - Winners 1970–71, 1973–74, 1981–82, 1983–84

== Records ==
- Best FA Vase performance: Second round, 1983–84
