= Bungay Town F.C. =

Association football club in England

Coordinates: 52°27′42.87″N 1°26′41.62″E

Bungay Town
- Full name: Bungay Town Football Club
- Nickname: Black Dogs
- Founded: 9 July 1925
- Ground: Maltings Meadow Sports Ground, Bungay
- Chairman: Jon Fuller
- Manager: Michael King
- League: Anglian Combination Premier Division
- 2024–25: Anglian Combination Premier Division, 9th of 16
Home colours	Away colours

Bungay Town Football Club is a football club based in Bungay, Suffolk, England. The club are currently members of the Anglian Combination Premier Division and play at the Maltings Meadow Sports Ground.

== History ==
The club was founded following a public meeting on 9 July 1925 following a poor season for both Bungay United and Bungay Harriers in the South Norfolk League. The new club entered both the Lowestoft & District League and the North Suffolk League, and after doing well in both, moved up to the East Anglian League in 1926. In 1933 they switched to the Norwich & District League, before joining the Norfolk & Suffolk League in 1935.

After World War II they won the league in three successive seasons between 1946–47 and 1948–49 and again in 1951–52, after which they applied to join the Eastern Counties League but were unsuccessful. They also won the League Cup in three successive seasons from 1947–48 to 1949–50 and again in 1955–56, as well as the Suffolk Senior Cup, which they won in 1950 and 1961. They also entered the FA Cup for the first time in 1950–51, continuing to do so until 1963. During their period of success, crowds reached four figures.

In 1963 the club entered the Eastern Counties League. However, they finished bottom in their first season and withdrew at its end to become founder members of the Anglian Combination, which had been formed by a merger of the Norfolk & Suffolk League and the East Anglian League. They were placed in Division One and were promoted to the Premier Division at the end of the 1968–69 season. Following relegation back to Division One in 1972–73 they went on to become somewhat of a yo-yo club, as they were promoted in 1974–75, relegated in 1978–79, promoted in 1980–81, relegated in 1983–84, promoted in 1987–88 and relegated again in 1989–90. In 1992 they were relegated to Division Two, before returning to Division One in 1998. They were demoted back to Division Two in 2002, before returning to Division One in 2008. They were relegated back to Division Two after finishing bottom of the table in 2010–11. In 2013–14 the club won the Cyril Ballyn League Cup. They retained the trophy the following season, also winning the Division Two title to earn promotion back to Division One.

In 2023–24 they were Division One runners-up, securing promotion to the Premier Division.

The club entered the FA Vase between 1974 and 1983 but have not done so since.

== Ground ==
The club initially played at the Recreation Ground. A grandstand was built in 1934, but it was destroyed by a bomb during World War II and was not rebuilt. The ground was in a flood plain, resulting in the pitch being described as "frequently reduced to a quagmire". Matches were sometimes moved to Outney Common or Honeypot Meadow on Bardolph Lane (now a police station). In 1953 they moved to their current ground at Maltings Meadow, a move which had first been suggested in 1947. The new ground was opened with a match against Lowestoft club Eastern Coachworks on 27 August 1953 attended by 300.

Although Bungay is in Suffolk, both the club's main grounds have been across the border in Norfolk, and the only times they have played home matches in Suffolk were the temporary arrangements at Outney Common and Honeypot Meadow.

== Honours ==
- Norfolk & Suffolk League
  - Champions 1946–47, 1947–48, 1948–49, 1951–52
  - League Cup winners 1947–48, 1948–49, 1949–50, 1955–56
- Anglian Combination
  - Division One champions 1974–75, 1980–81, 1987–88
  - Division Two champions 2014–15
  - Cyril Ballyn Cup winners 2013–14, 2014–15
- Suffolk Senior Cup
  - Winners 1949–50, 1960–61

== Records ==
- Best FA Cup performance: Third qualifying round, 1956–57, 1959–60, 1960–61
- Best FA Vase performance: First round, 1974–75, 1975–76, 1976–77, 1979–80, 1981–82
- Record attendance:
  - 2,498 vs Wycombe Wanderers, FA Amateur Cup first round, January 1950 (at the Recreation Ground)
  - 1,618 vs Great Yarmouth Town, FA Cup third qualifying round, 20 October 1956 (at Maltings Meadow)

== See also ==
- Bungay Town F.C. players
