= Kirkley & Pakefield F.C. =

Association football club in England

Coordinates: 52°27′22.45″N 1°43′35.46″E

Kirkley & Pakefield
- Full name: Kirkley & Pakefield Football Club
- Nickname: The Royals
- Founded: 1975
- Ground: Walmer Road, Lowestoft
- Capacity: 2,000 (150 seated)
- Chairman: Graham Bunning
- Manager: Scott Butler
- League: Eastern Counties League Premier Division
- 2024–25: Eastern Counties League Premier Division, 14th of 20
Home colours

Kirkley & Pakefield Football Club is a football club based in Lowestoft, Suffolk, England. They are currently members of the Eastern Counties League Premier Division and play at Walmer Road.

== History ==
The original Kirkley Football Club was established in 1886, and the first recorded game was a match against East Suffolk on 4 December at Crown Meadow. The club played several more matches before merging with East Suffolk to form Lowestoft Town the following year. However, following a trial for players in late 1889, a second Kirkley club was formed just over a year later in 1890, playing their first match on 15 November against Clifford House School. They originally played on a pitch at St Aubin's College, forming strong links with the college, whose headmaster employed several former Cambridge Blues as teachers. With several teachers playing for the club, they won the Suffolk Junior Cup in 1894. For a brief time the club became the dominant side in Lowestoft, reaching the semi-finals of the FA Amateur Cup in 1896–97.

At the time Kirkley were playing in the North Suffolk League, and were champions in 1894–95 and 1896–97. In 1897 they were founder members of the Norfolk & Suffolk League, although they continued to play in the North Suffolk League as well. Despite finishing second-from-bottom of the Norfolk & Suffolk League in its inaugural season, they were runners-up in 1898–99. After four consecutive losing appearances in the Suffolk Senior Cup final, the club won the trophy for the first time in 1900–01 and retained it the following year, a season in which they also won the North Suffolk League. They were runners-up in the Norfolk & Suffolk League again in 1903–04 and won the North Suffolk League title in 1905–06 and 1907–08.

Plans to merge with Lowestoft at the end of the 1907–08 season due to financial difficulties were abandoned after the "Good Friday Fiasco", in which Lowestoft used reserve players in a league match against Kirkley in order to rest first team players for the cup matches between the two clubs. The following season saw the club retain the North Suffolk League title. In 1909 they also began playing in the East Anglian League. However, the club finished bottom of the table in 1911–12 and again in 1912–13. Their financial difficulties had continued, leading to the club disbanding at the end of the 1913–14 season, at a time when Stanley Rous was playing for the club.

A third Kirkley was established during the 1919–20 season. They rejoined the East Anglian League in 1921 and were runners-up in 1922–23 before winning the league in 1923–24. They then returned to the Norfolk & Suffolk League for the 1924–25 season, in which they also won the Suffolk Senior Cup; the club's place in the East Anglan League was taken by the reserves. After merging with Waveney Athletic in 1929, the club became known as Kirkley & Waveney, although they reverted to the name Kirkley in 1932. In 1935 they merged with Lowestoft Town and ceased to exist again.

The modern Kirkley came into being in 1975 when Anglian Combination club Brooke Marine, who were linked to the Brooke Marine shipbuilders and playing at the Kirkley Recreation Ground on Walmer Road, applied to change their name to Kirkley Football Club. As the name was owned by Lowestoft Town, the club had to take the name Kirkley United in 1978. Under the new name they were Division Two champions in 1978–79, earning promotion to Division One. The following season the club won Division One and were promoted to the Premier Division. However, after finishing second-from-bottom of the Premier Division in 1983–84 they were relegated back to Division One. After winning the Division One title in 1988–89 the club returned to the Premier Division.

Kirkley were Premier Division champions in 1999–2000 and won the Suffolk Senior Cup the following season. In 2001–02 they claimed a treble, winning the Premier Division title, the league's Senior Knock-out Cup, and the Suffolk Senior Cup again, beating Haverhill Rovers 4–3 after extra time. In 2002–03 they won the Premier Division title for a third time in four years, and were promoted to Division One of the Eastern Counties League. The club were promoted to the Premier Division after finishing third in Division One in 2004–05. In 2007 they merged with Pakefield Football Club, adopting their current name.

== Ground ==
After initially playing at St Aubin's College, the second Kirkley moved to the Kirkley Recreation Ground on Walmer Road in 1896 after the site was bought by several local businessmen for the club for £746 17s 6d. The new ground was opened on 5 September 1896. Financial difficulties led to the club selling the ground to the Lowestoft Corporation for £1,600 in the late 1900s, after which they moved to a ground on Carlton Road known as the Run.

When the third version of Kirkley were established, they continued to play at the Run, before returning to the Kirkley Recreation Ground in the early 1920s. The modern Kirkley also played at the Recreation Ground, now more commonly known as Walmer Road. On 26 December 2005 the club played its first league match against Lowestoft Town since the 1934–35 season, attracting a record crowd of 1,125. The ground currently has a capacity of 2,000, of which 150 is seated and covered.

== Honours ==
- Suffolk Senior Cup
  - Winners 1900–01, 1901–02, 1924–25, 2000–01, 2001–02
- Suffolk Junior Cup
  - Winners 1894, 1898
- Anglian Combination
  - Premier Division champions 2001–02, 2002–03
  - Senior Knock-out Cup winners 2001–0202
  - Division One champions 1979–80, 1988–89
  - Division Two champions 1978–79
- East Anglian League
  - Champions 1923–24
- North Suffolk League
  - Champions 1894–95, 1896–97, 1901–02, 1905–06, 1907–08, 1908–09

== Records ==
- Best FA Cup performance: Second qualifying round, 1902–03, 2007–08, 2009–10, 2015–16
- Best FA Vase performance: Fourth round, 2009–10, 2019–20
- Record attendance: 1,125 vs Lowestoft Town, Eastern Counties League Premier Division, 26 December 2005
- Most appearances: Barry Dale, 495
- Most goals: Barry Dale, 241

== See also ==
- Kirkley & Pakefield F.C. players
