= Lowestoft Town F.C. =

Association football club in England

Coordinates: 52°28′51″N 1°44′49″E

Lowestoft Town
- Full name: Lowestoft Town Football Club
- Nickname: Trawler Boys
- Founded: 1887 (merger)
- Stadium: Crown Meadow
- Capacity: 3,000 (455 seated)
- Chairman: Iain Small
- Manager: Cion Wren (interim)
- League: Isthmian League North Division
- 2025–26: Isthmian League North Division, 16th of 22
- Website: lowestofttownfc.co.uk
Home colours	Away colours

Lowestoft Town Football Club is a semi-professional football club based in Lowestoft, Suffolk, England. They are currently members of the Isthmian League North Division and play at Crown Meadow.

== History ==
The club was established in 1887 as Lowestoft FC by a merger of East Suffolk and the original Kirkley, and were renamed Lowestoft Town in 1890. They joined the Norfolk & Suffolk League as founder members in 1897, and won six of the first seven championships, also playing in the North Suffolk League, where they also won six championships in seven seasons. They reached the final of the FA Amateur Cup in 1900, losing the final 5–1 to Bishop Auckland, and also reached the semi-finals in 1902–03, losing in a replay to Oxford City. In the 1926–27 season they reached the first round of the FA Cup the first time, losing 10–1 at Watford. They won the Norfolk & Suffolk League again in 1928–29 and 1930–31.

In 1935 the club merged with another incarnation of Kirkley, and joined the new Eastern Counties League. They shared the first championship with Harwich & Parkeston, before winning it outright in 1937–38. The following season they won the League Cup with a 4–1 win over Colchester Town reserves, and also reached the first round of the FA Cup losing 6–0 at Swindon Town.

They won the League Cup again in 1955, and after turning semi-professional in 1962, dominated the league during the 1960s, winning the championship in 1962–63 and finishing runners-up in 1963–64. They then won four successive championships, before finishing second in 1968–69 and going on to win two more titles in the following seasons, as well as winning the League Cup in 1966, 1967 and 1969. They also reached the first round of the FA Cup in 1966–67, losing 2–1 at Orient, and again the following season, when they lost 1–0 at home to Watford.

However, the club's fortunes then went into decline, although they won the League Cup in 1976, and a league and cup double in 1977–78, a season in which they reached the FA Cup first round again, losing 2–0 at home to Cambridge United.

They won the league again in 2005–06, and in 2008 reached the final of the FA Vase, where they lost 2–1 to Kirkham & Wesham. The following season they won the Premier Division of the Eastern Counties League again, together with the Suffolk Premier Cup, and were promoted to Division One North of the Isthmian League. They won the league at the first attempt to earn promotion to the Premier Division, also reaching the first round of the FA Cup, losing 1–0 at Wrexham. In their first season in the Premier Division they finished fourth and reached the play-off final, where they lost 4–3 at Tonbridge Angels. In 2011–12 the club reached the play-off final again after finishing third, but lost 2–1 to AFC Hornchurch after extra time. The club also reached the final of the Suffolk Premier Cup, in which they defeated Bury Town 4–2. In 2012–13 Lowestoft reached the play-off final for the third consecutive season after finishing as runners-up, this time losing 2–1 at home to Concord Rangers.

After finishing fourth the following season, the club finally earned promotion to the Football Conference North, winning the play-off final at the fourth attempt after beating AFC Hornchurch 3–0. After finishing mid-table in their first season and winning the Suffolk Premier Cup, beating Whitton United 2–1 after extra time, they were relegated from the renamed National League North at the end of the 2015–16 season, although they retained the Premier Cup with a 3–1 win over Leiston. The club were transferred to the Premier Central division of the Southern League at the end of the 2017–18 season as part of the restructuring of the non-League pyramid. In 2021–22 they finished bottom of the Premier Central Division, resulting in relegation to Division One North of the Isthmian League. The 2023–24 season saw them win the North Division, earning promotion to the Premier Division Central of the Southern League. However, they finished third-from-bottom of the Premier Division Central the following season and were relegated back to the Isthmian League's North Division.

== Colours and badge ==
Lowestoft Town's club colours are all blue with white trim and the club's second choice kit, usually when away from home, is a deep pink. There is no third strip for the 2025–26 season.

The club badge is the town crest of Lowestoft.

== Ground ==
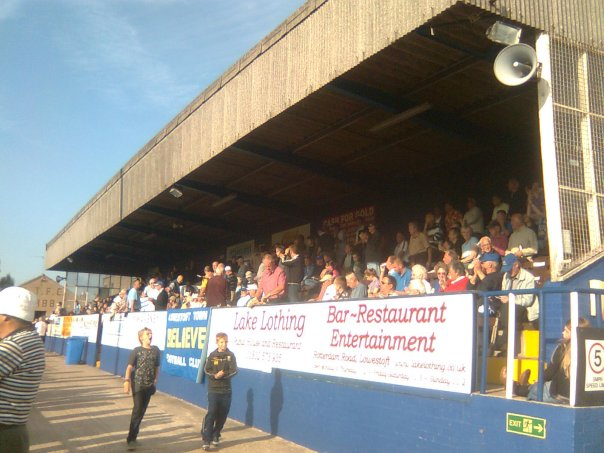
The Main Stand at Crown Meadow

Lowestoft originally played at the Crown Meadow Athletics Ground, which shared part of the same site as the modern Crown Meadow. In 1889 they moved to a ground in North Denes but returned to the new Crown Meadow in 1894. It was opened with a match against Lowestoft Harriers on 22 September 1894. In 1922 the club bought the ground from the council for £3,150 after it looked as though the site may be sold for housing. Floodlights were installed in 1964 and a social club built in the same year. The record crowd of 5,000 was set for the FA Cup match against Watford in 1967.

In 1988 the 1885 pavilion was demolished and part of the site was sold to a developer, with the proceeds funding the building of a new changing room and hospitality block. Today the ground consists of a 466-seater stand with standing areas around the rest of the pitch.

== Management and coaching staff ==
=== Boardroom ===
Position	Name
Chairman	Iain Small
President	Alan Green

=== Current staff ===
As of 3 June 2025

Position	Name
Manager	Cion Wren (interim)
Assistant Manager	Vacant
Strength & Conditioning Coach	Vacant
Physio	Vacant

=== Managerial history ===
Period	Manager	Notes
1994–2000	(England) Micky Chapman	
2000–2015	(England) Micky Chapman & (England) Ady Gallagher	
2015-2017	(England) Ady Gallagher	
2017–2018	(England) Dale Brooks	
2018–2024	(England) Jamie Godbold	
2024–2026	(Canada) Andy Reynolds	
2026	(England) Robert Eagle	
2026-	Cion Wren (Interim)	

== Honours ==
- Isthmian League
  - Division One North champions 2009–10, 2023–24
- Eastern Counties League
  - Champions 1935–36 (joint), 1937–38, 1962–63, 1964–65, 1965–66, 1966–67, 1967–68, 1969–70, 1970–71, 1977–78, 2005–06, 2008–09
  - League Cup winners 1938–39, 1954–55, 1965–66, 1966–67, 1968–69, 1975–76, 1977–78, 1983–84, 2000–01, 2006–07
- Norfolk & Suffolk League
  - Champions 1897–98, 1898–99, 1900–01, 1901–02, 1902–03, 1903–04, 1928–29, 1930–31
- North Suffolk League
  - Champions 1897–98, 1898–99, 1899–1900, 1900–01, 1902–03, 1903–04, 1904–05
- Suffolk Premier Cup
  - Winners 1966–67, 1971–72, 1974–75, 1978–79, 1979–80, 1999–2000, 2000–01, 2004–05, 2005–06, 2008–09, 2011–12, 2014–15, 2015–16
- Suffolk Senior Cup
  - Winners 1902–03, 1922–23, 1923–24, 1925–26, 1931–32, 1935–36, 1946–47, 1947–48, 1948–49, 1955–56
- East Anglian Cup
  - Winners 1929–30, 1970–71, 1977–78

== Records ==
- Best FA Cup performance: First round, 1926–27, 1938–39, 1966–67, 1967–68, 1977–78, 2009–10
- Best FA Trophy performance: Second round, 1971–72
- Best FA Vase performance: Runners up, 2007–08
- Record attendance: 5,000 vs Watford, FA Cup first round, 1967

== See also ==
- Lowestoft Town F.C. players
- Lowestoft Town F.C. managers
