= 1988–89 Eastern Counties Football League =

The 1988–89 season was the 47th in the history of Eastern Counties Football League a football competition in England.

It was the first season the league consisted of two divisions. Sudbury Town were champions, winning their sixth Eastern Counties Football League title.

== Premier Division ==
Eastern Counties Football League Premier Division
- Season: 1988–89
- Champions: Sudbury Town
- Relegated: Ely City; Soham Town Rangers
- Matches: 420
- Goals: 1,420 (3.38 per match)

The Premier Division featured 21 clubs which competed in the Eastern Counties League last season, no new clubs joined the division this season.

=== League table ===
Pos	Team	Pld	W	D	L	GF	GA	GD	Pts	Promotion or relegation
1	Sudbury Town	40	29	6	5	117	46	+71	93	
2	Braintree Town	40	26	7	7	106	41	+65	85	
3	Wisbech Town	40	24	12	4	84	40	+44	84	
4	March Town United	40	22	9	9	76	49	+27	72 (Note: March Town United were deducted three points.)	
5	Great Yarmouth Town	40	21	9	10	75	50	+25	72	
6	Histon	40	19	7	14	87	57	+30	64	
7	Haverhill Rovers	40	18	8	14	63	63	0	62	
8	Stowmarket Town	40	17	9	14	69	51	+18	60	
9	Thetford Town	40	17	8	15	79	74	+5	59	
10	Felixstowe Town	40	15	11	14	82	67	+15	56	
11	Gorleston	40	15	10	15	58	69	−11	55	
12	Lowestoft Town	40	15	8	17	68	71	−3	53	
13	Watton United	40	14	7	19	70	82	−12	49	
14	Harwich & Parkeston	40	12	11	17	60	64	−4	47	
15	Tiptree United	40	13	6	21	60	70	−10	45	
16	Newmarket Town	40	10	12	18	39	63	−24	42	
17	Brantham Athletic	40	11	8	21	57	90	−33	41	
18	Clacton Town	40	9	13	18	42	65	−23	40	
19	Chatteris Town	40	9	9	22	44	75	−31	36	
20	Ely City	40	8	6	26	48	108	−60	30	Relegated to Division One
21	Soham Town Rangers	40	6	4	30	36	125	−89	22	Relegated to Division One

Source: fchd
Rules for classification: 1) points; 2) goal difference; 3) number of goals scored.

== Division One ==
Eastern Counties Football League Division One
- Season: 1988–89
- Champions: Wroxham
- Promoted: Wroxham; Halstead Town
- Matches: 182
- Goals: 648 (3.56 per match)

It was the first Division One season, it was formed by:

- Clubs joined from the Peterborough and District League:
  - Coalite Yaxley
  - Downham Town
  - Huntingdon United
  - Long Sutton Athletic
  - Somersham Town
  - Warboys Town
- Clubs joined from the Anglian Combination:
  - Diss Town
  - Fakenham Town
  - Wroxham
- Plus:
  - Bury Town reserves
  - Halstead Town, transferred from the Essex Senior League
  - King's Lynn reserves
  - Loadwell Wanderers, joined from the Ipswich Sunday League
  - Mildenhall Town, joined from the Cambridgeshire County League

=== League table ===
Pos	Team	Pld	W	D	L	GF	GA	GD	Pts	Promotion
1	Wroxham	26	20	2	4	90	22	+68	62	Promoted to the Premier Division
2	Halstead Town	26	20	2	4	88	30	+58	62	Promoted to the Premier Division
3	Diss Town	26	18	5	3	65	31	+34	59	
4	Fakenham Town	26	13	5	8	42	31	+11	44	
5	Downham Town	26	10	8	8	49	46	+3	38	
6	Loadwell Wanderers	26	10	7	9	57	47	+10	37	
7	Long Sutton Athletic	26	8	7	11	40	44	−4	31	
8	Bury Town reserves	26	9	4	13	38	53	−15	31	
9	Huntingdon United	26	8	7	11	30	48	−18	31	
10	Coalite Yaxley	26	8	5	13	38	42	−4	29	
11	King's Lynn reserves	26	7	8	11	33	39	−6	29	
12	Warboys Town	26	7	5	14	31	57	−26	26	
13	Mildenhall Town	26	2	8	16	23	72	−49	14	
14	Somersham Town	26	3	5	18	24	86	−62	14	

Source: fchd
Rules for classification: 1) points; 2) goal difference; 3) number of goals scored.
