= Peterborough Senior Cup =

Peterborough & District Senior Cup
- Organiser(s): Peterborough and District FA
- Founded: 1980; 45 years ago
- Region: Peterborough
- Current champions: Oakham United (1st title)
- Most championships: Ortonians (7 titles)

The Senior Cup is the prominent knockout competition for the Peterborough & District Football Association (PDFA). According to the current rules of the competition, it is open to all clubs whose affiliation is with the PDFA and those affiliated to the Northamptonshire County Football Association that lie within 10 miles of Peterborough. The current holders are Oakham United who defeated Warboys Town 4-3 on penalties after the match ended 0–0 at London Road Stadium in Peterborough.

== History ==
The PDFA covers the town of Peterborough, Rutland, South Lincolnshire and parts of north west Cambridgeshire. For the purposes of the Senior Cup and other cup competitions, clubs affiliated to the Northamptonshire County Football Association that lie within 10 miles of Peterborough town centre are also included. The Senior Cup was first competed in the 1980-81 season.

=== Winners ===
#	Season	Winner	Result	Runner-up	Notes
1	1980–81	Whittlesey	–	United Parson Drove	
2	1981–82	Ramsey Town	–	Wisbech United	
3	1982–83	Ortonians Eye	–	United	
4	1983–84	Yaxley Kings	–	Lynn res.	
5	1984–85	Somersham Town	–	Whittlesey United	
6	1985–86	Ortonians	–	Perkin Sports	
7	1986–87	Downham Town	–	Huntingdon United	
8	1987–88	Perkin Sports	–	Pinchbeck United	
9	1988–89	LBC Ortonians	–	Stamford Belvedere	
10	1989–90	LBC Ortonians	–	Stamford Belvedere	
11	1990–91	Wisbech Town	–	Leverington Sport res.	
12	1991–92	Deeping Rangers	–	Whittlesey United	
13	1992–93	Molins	–	Ortonians	
14	1993–94	Perkins	–	Sports Moulton Harrox	
15	1994–95	Leverington	–	Sports Hotpoint	
16	1995–96	Ortonians	–	Moulton Harrox	
17	1996–97	Deeping Rangers	–	Leverington Sports	
18	1997–98	Wisbech Town res.	–	Oundle Town	
19	1998–99	Perkins Sports	–	Deeping Rangers	
20	1999–2000	Oundle Town	–	Long Sutton Athletic	
21	2000–01	Eye United	–	Hotpoint	
22	2001–02	Eye United	–	Long Sutton Athletic	
23	2002–03	Eye United	–	Hotpoint	
24	2003–04	Ortonians	–	Alconbury	
25	2004–05	Ortonians	–	Alconbury	
26	2005–06	Deeping Rangers	–	Crowland Town	
27	2006–07	Alconbury	–	Moulton Harrox	
28	2007–08	Perkins Sports	–	Parson Drove	
29	2008–09	Rutland Rangers	–	Moulton Harrox	
30	2009–10	Rutland Rangers	–	Ramsey Town	
31	2010–11	Moulton Harrox	–	Ramsey Town	
32	2011–12	Pinchbeck United	–	Netherton United	
33	2012–13	Moulton Harrox	3–0	Peterborough ICA Sports	
34	2013–14	Peterborough ICA Sports	1–0	Sawtry	
35	2014–15	Coates Athletic	3–3	Netherton United	Coastes Athletic won 5–3 on penalties.
36	2015–16	Whittlesey Athletic	1–0	Langtoft United	
37	2016–17	Peterborough ICA Sports	–	Pinchbeck United	
38	2017–18	Netherton United	4–2	Moulton Harrox	
39	2018–19	Whittlesey Athletic	4–3	Moulton Harrox	
40	2019–20	Competition suspended after semi-finals due to COVID-19 pandemic. Netherton United and Uppingham Town were in the finals,			
41	2020–21	Uppingham Town	–	Moulton Harrox	
43	2022–23	Uppingham Town	4–2	Holbeach United res.	
44	2023–24	Oakham United	0–0	Warboys Town	Oakham United won 4–3 on penalties.

=== Wins by teams ===
Club	Winners	Last win	Runners-up	Last Final	Notes
Ortonians †	7	2004–05	1	2004–05	Won 1 title as Ortonians Eye and 2 titles as LBC Ortonians. Dissolved in 2010.
Deeping Rangers	3	2005–06	1	2005–06	
Eye United	3	2002–03	0	2002–03	
Perkins Sports	4	2007–08	0	2007–08	Won 1 title as Perkins.
Moulton Harrox	2	2012–13	0	2012–13	
Peterborough ICA Sports	2	2016–17	1	2016–17	
Rutland Rangers †	2	2009–10	0	2009–10	Dissolved in 2014.
Uppingham Town	2	2022–23	0	2022–23	
Whittlesey Athletic	2	2018–19	0	2018–19	
Wisbech Town	2	1997–98	0	1997–98	
Alconbury	1	2006–07	2	2006–07	
Coates Athletic	1	2014–15	1	2014–15	
Downham Town	1	1986–87	0	1986–87	
Leverington	1	1994–95	1	1996–97	Competed as Leverington Sports in 1996–97.
Molins †	1	1992–93	0	1992–93	Dissolved in 1986.
Netherton United	1	2017–18	2	2017–18	
Oakham United	1	2023–24	0	2023–24	
Oundle Town	1	1999–2000	1	1999–2000	
Pinchbeck United	1	2011–12	2	2016–17	
Ramsey Town	1	1981–82	2	2010–11	
Somersham Town	1	1984–85	0	1984–85	
Whittlesey	1	1980–81	0	1980–81	
Yaxley Kings †	1	1983–84	0	1983–84	Dissolved in 2005.

== Recent finals ==
3 May 2013	Moulton Harrox	3–0	Peterborough ICA Sports	London Road, Peterborough
19:45 BST	Tom Panton; Bobby Patterson; Joe Townsend	Report

16 May 2014	Sawtry	0–1	Peterborough ICA Sports	London Road, Peterborough
19:45 BST		Report	Matthew Barber

27 April 2015	Coates Athletic	3–3 (5–3 p)	Netherton United	London Road, Peterborough
19:45 BST	Liam Harold; Adam Piergianni	Report	Tom Randall; Dwayne Rankin; Lee Clementson

19 May 2016	Whittlesey Athletic	1–0	Langtoft United	London Road, Peterborough
19:45 BST	Adam Piergianni	Report		Referee: Lee Hartley

17 May 2018	Moulton Harrox	2–4	Netherton United	London Road, Peterborough
20:00 BST	Danny Maddison; Marcus Parry	Report		Referee: Neil Smith

11 May 2019	Moulton Harrox	3–4	Whittlesey Athletic	Nene Valley Community Centre, Peterborough
17:30 BST	Declan Earth; Danny Maddison; Tom Panton	Report	Jack Carter; Aaron Dunmore	Referee: Nicolae Manolescu

9 May 2020	Netherton United	CANC	Uppingham Town	Nene Valley Community Centre, Peterborough
17:30 BST		Report

2021	Uppingham Town	-	Moulton Harrox

5 May 2023	Holbeach United res.	2–4	Uppingham Town	Haydon Whitham Stadium, Market Deeping
19:45 BST	Jordan Keeble	Report	Oliver Lewin; Jordan Neil; Josh Porter; Will Thomas	Referee: Ed Brandon

17 May 2024	Oakham United	0–0 (4–3 p)	Warboys Town	London Road, Peterborough
19:15 BST		Report		Referee: Terry Spriggs
