= 1989–90 Eastern Counties Football League =

The 1989–90 season was the 48th in the history of Eastern Counties Football League a football competition in England.

Sudbury Town were champions for the second time in a row, winning their seventh Eastern Counties Football League title and were promoted to the Southern Football League for the first time in their history.

== Premier Division ==
Eastern Counties Football League Premier Division
- Season: 1989–90
- Champions: Sudbury Town
- Promoted: Sudbury Town
- Matches: 420
- Goals: 1,447 (3.45 per match)

The Premier Division featured 19 clubs which competed in the division last season, along with two new clubs, promoted from Division One:

- Halstead Town
- Wroxham

=== League table ===
Pos	Team	Pld	W	D	L	GF	GA	GD	Pts	Promotion or relegation
1	Sudbury Town	40	28	4	8	130	52	+78	88	Promoted to the Southern Football League
2	Thetford Town	40	23	7	10	86	56	+30	76	
3	Braintree Town	40	22	9	9	94	49	+45	75	
4	Harwich & Parkeston	40	20	13	7	77	42	+35	73	
5	Gorleston	40	20	9	11	61	46	+15	69	
6	Great Yarmouth Town	40	19	10	11	80	62	+18	67	
7	Histon	40	19	8	13	85	60	+25	65	
8	Brantham Athletic	40	19	8	13	78	63	+15	65	
9	March Town United	40	18	11	11	68	58	+10	65	
10	Wisbech Town	40	18	9	13	73	46	+27	63	
11	Stowmarket Town	40	17	9	14	54	51	+3	60	
12	Wroxham	40	16	9	15	71	76	−5	57	
13	Felixstowe Town	40	13	12	15	59	61	−2	51	
14	Halstead Town	40	14	7	19	82	99	−17	49	
15	Haverhill Rovers	40	12	8	20	64	69	−5	44	
16	Watton United	40	8	19	13	62	61	+1	43	
17	Newmarket Town	40	10	13	17	42	54	−12	43	
18	Lowestoft Town	40	11	8	21	65	77	−12	41	
19	Tiptree United	40	9	10	21	46	68	−22	37	
20	Clacton Town	40	7	8	25	48	89	−41	29	
21	Chatteris Town	40	0	3	37	22	208	−186	3	

Source: fchd
Rules for classification: 1) points; 2) goal difference; 3) number of goals scored.

== Division One ==
Eastern Counties Football League Division One
- Season: 1989–90
- Champions: Cornard United
- Promoted: Cornard United
- Matches: 272
- Goals: 887 (3.26 per match)

Division One featured twelve clubs which competed in the division last season, along with five new clubs:

- Cornard United, joined from the Essex and Suffolk Border League
- Ely City, relegated from the Premier Division
- Norwich United, joined from the Anglian Combination
- Soham Town Rangers, relegated from the Premier Division
- Woodbridge Town, joined from the Suffolk and Ipswich League

Also, Loadwell Ipswich changed name to Ipswich Wanderers.

=== League table ===
Pos	Team	Pld	W	D	L	GF	GA	GD	Pts	Promotion
1	Cornard United	32	22	5	5	88	32	+56	71	Promoted to the Premier Division
2	Norwich United	32	21	6	5	91	26	+65	69	
3	Soham Town Rangers	32	21	5	6	58	28	+30	68	
4	Fakenham Town	32	18	9	5	60	30	+30	63	
5	Ely City	32	17	6	9	59	44	+15	57	
6	Diss Town	32	16	7	9	63	37	+26	55	
7	King's Lynn reserves	32	16	7	9	50	40	+10	55	
8	Downham Town	32	16	4	12	64	46	+18	52	
9	Woodbridge Town	32	12	7	13	53	43	+10	43	
10	Mildenhall Town	32	12	7	13	48	55	−7	43	
11	Long Sutton Athletic	32	11	4	17	43	49	−6	37	
12	Ipswich Wanderers	32	9	8	15	53	72	−19	35	
13	Somersham Town	32	9	3	20	36	67	−31	30	
14	Huntingdon United	32	7	8	17	36	57	−21	29	
15	Coalite Yaxley	32	7	6	19	29	66	−37	27	
16	Bury Town reserves	32	6	4	22	36	82	−46	22	
17	Warboys Town	32	3	2	27	20	113	−93	11	

Source: fchd
Rules for classification: 1) points; 2) goal difference; 3) number of goals scored.
