= 2015–16 United Counties League =

The 2015–16 United Counties League season (known as the 2015–16 ChromaSport & Trophies United Counties League for sponsorship reasons) was the 109th in the history of the United Counties League, a football competition in England.

== Premier Division ==
United Counties League Premier Division
- Season: 2015–16
- Champions: Kempston Rovers
- Promoted: Kempston Rovers
- Matches: 462
- Goals: 1,616 (3.5 per match)

The Premier Division featured 19 clubs which competed in the division last season, along with three new clubs:

- Kirby Muxloe, transferred from the Midland League
- Northampton Spencer, promoted from Division One
- Rothwell Corinthians, promoted from Division One

In addition, Thurnby Nirvana changed their name to Leicester Nirvana.

Three clubs have applied for promotion to Step 4: AFC Kempston Rovers, Kirby Muxloe and Leicester Nirvana.

=== League table ===
Pos	Team	Pld	W	D	L	GF	GA	GD	Pts	Promotion
1	Kempston Rovers	42	28	13	1	111	31	+80	97	Promoted to the Southern Football League
2	Leicester Nirvana	42	31	4	7	129	51	+78	97	
3	Newport Pagnell Town	42	26	5	11	94	54	+40	83	
4	Holbeach United	42	21	7	14	94	63	+31	70	
5	Cogenhoe United	42	20	9	13	70	67	+3	69	
6	Eynesbury Rovers	42	20	8	14	64	48	+16	68	
7	Sleaford Town	42	21	5	16	83	69	+14	68	
8	Wisbech Town	42	19	9	14	82	68	+14	66	
9	Kirby Muxloe	42	19	8	15	63	58	+5	62 (Note: Kirby Muxloe were deducted three points for fielding an ineligible player against Huntingdon Town on 22 August 2015.)	
10	Deeping Rangers	42	16	12	14	81	64	+17	60	
11	Harborough Town	42	18	6	18	57	59	−2	60	
12	Yaxley	42	19	7	16	93	79	+14	61 (Note: Yaxley were deducted six points for fielding an ineligible player and team sheet irregularities in a match against Holbeach United on 28 December 2015.)	
13	Northampton Spencer	42	16	9	17	74	81	−7	57	Resigned from the league
14	Rothwell Corinthians	42	17	5	20	60	67	−7	56	
15	Desborough Town	42	16	7	19	64	79	−15	55	
16	Boston Town	42	14	6	22	76	92	−16	48	
17	Peterborough Northern Star	42	13	8	21	70	84	−14	47	
18	Harrowby United	42	13	8	21	70	102	−32	47	
19	Northampton Sileby Rangers	42	12	10	20	78	94	−16	46	
20	Wellingborough Town	42	11	7	24	57	90	−33	40	
21	Oadby Town	42	9	7	26	66	89	−23	34	
22	Huntingdon Town	42	2	2	38	26	173	−147	8	

Source: fchd
Rules for classification: 1) points; 2) goal difference; 3) number of goals scored.

=== Results ===
Home \ Away	KEM	BOS	COG	DEE	DES	EYN	HAR	HBY	HOL	HUN	KIM	KVP	NPT	NSR	NSP	OAD	PNS	ROC	SLE	WLT	WIS	YAX
Kempston Rovers		7–0	3–1	2–1	3–0	3–0	0–0	3–2	1–1	9–0	5–0	2–0	2–0	3–1	1–1	1–1	4–0	2–1	1–0	1–0	2–1	3–0
Boston Town	0–2		1–3	0–2	1–3	2–2	1–0	5–1	0–1	6–1	1–1	2–3	3–2	2–2	2–3	4–2	1–3	0–1	3–3	2–1	1–1	4–0
Cogenhoe United	3–3	5–0		2–1	2–1	0–0	2–0	1–4	1–5	3–0	0–0	4–3	1–4	2–1	3–1	2–4	0–0	0–1	1–0	1–1	3–1	2–1
Deeping Rangers	1–1	1–3	3–0		0–0	0–2	0–0	7–3	1–3	7–2	0–1	3–2	1–0	1–1	5–1	1–0	4–2	1–1	1–1	5–1	2–2	4–2
Desborough Town	0–2	4–3	2–0	0–1		2–2	2–4	6–1	1–0	4–0	1–3	2–4	0–2	2–1	0–4	3–2	1–0	0–1	2–1	3–0	1–1	3–2
Eynesbury Rovers	2–1	0–1	0–0	4–2	1–0		4–0	2–0	0–0	6–0	1–0	1–2	0–3	1–3	0–1	2–1	0–1	2–1	1–2	2–1	1–0	1–2
Harborough Town	1–6	1–1	3–0	1–0	2–0	0–3		2–0	0–1	4–1	0–1	1–2	0–1	1–0	4–0	3–1	3–2	2–1	2–0	1–2	1–5	1–3
Harrowby United	0–2	5–2	1–1	3–0	1–1	2–2	0–2		0–3	3–0	1–0	1–6	1–4	6–0	3–0	1–3	3–2	0–2	3–1	3–0	1–1	1–3
Holbeach United	3–3	1–2	4–2	3–1	3–1	1–3	5–0	2–0		3–1	4–0	1–2	1–2	4–0	2–2	3–2	4–2	1–2	2–0	5–0	5–3	0–1
Huntingdon Town	0–7	1–4	1–2	0–3	2–4	1–1	0–3	0–0	1–5		1–2	1–8	2–3	0–5	0–5	0–4	0–1	1–3	0–3	1–0	1–6	0–3
Kirby Muxloe	1–2	1–0	1–4	0–0	8–0	2–1	2–1	5–0	3–2	3–0		0–3	0–2	4–2	1–1	0–0	0–0	3–1	3–0	0–0	0–3	0–2
Leicester Nirvana	2–2	3–0	5–1	1–1	6–1	0–2	2–0	5–0	7–0	2–1	1–0		5–1	4–0	2–2	0–0	4–2	3–2	2–3	4–1	1–2	4–0
Newport Pagnell Town	1–1	4–3	1–1	1–0	4–2	2–1	1–2	7–1	3–1	8–0	1–0	2–4		2–2	7–0	2–1	3–2	2–0	2–0	2–2	0–1	2–1
Northampton Sileby Rangers	0–4	4–1	2–3	4–4	1–1	1–1	1–1	4–4	1–1	7–2	2–2	3–4	0–1		1–2	2–1	3–2	3–1	3–2	1–2	3–1	1–3
Northampton Spencer	1–1	2–1	0–1	3–2	1–4	2–3	0–1	1–1	3–2	7–0	1–2	0–3	0–0	0–1		2–0	2–1	1–3	4–2	1–2	1–2	1–4
Oadby Town	0–4	1–3	1–3	3–1	1–2	1–2	2–3	1–2	2–3	4–0	0–2	1–5	0–1	3–1	1–0		2–2	1–2	2–1	1–1	2–4	2–3
Peterborough Northern Star	1–1	2–3	1–2	4–1	2–2	2–3	1–0	4–5	0–0	2–1	2–1	1–4	2–1	4–3	2–3	4–3		0–1	3–1	1–1	2–4	3–0
Rothwell Corinthians	1–3	1–3	1–1	1–4	2–1	3–0	2–1	5–1	2–1	3–0	1–3	1–3	0–2	3–4	1–1	1–1	1–0		1–3	1–3	2–3	1–0
Sleaford Town	0–3	3–1	4–2	0–3	1–0	2–1	0–0	2–1	2–2	7–2	4–1	1–0	3–2	1–0	4–6	1–2	3–1	1–0		4–0	3–3	4–0
Wellingborough Town	1–2	3–1	0–3	1–1	0–1	1–0	0–3	3–2	2–1	8–0	2–3	2–3	3–4	3–2	1–2	1–1	0–1	2–0	1–5		0–3	0–2
Wisbech Town	2–2	3–2	1–0	1–3	1–1	0–1	1–1	0–1	2–1	0–1	3–0	0–2	3–2	1–2	1–2	5–3	4–1	2–0	1–3	3–2		1–1
Yaxley	1–1	3–1	1–2	2–2	3–0	0–3	3–2	2–2	2–4	5–1	3–4	1–3	2–0	4–0	4–4	6–3	2–2	2–2	1–2	8–3	5–0	

Source: FA Full-Time (ChromaSport & Trophies United Counties League)
Legend: Blue = home team win; Yellow = draw; Red = away team win.

== Division One ==
United Counties League Division One
- Season: 2015–16
- Champions: Peterborough Sports
- Promoted: Peterborough Sports; Northampton ON Chenecks
- Matches: 342
- Goals: 1,298 (3.8 per match)

Division One featured 18 clubs which competed in the division last season, along with two new clubs:

- Long Buckby, relegated from the Premier Division
- Oakham United, promoted from the Peterborough and District Football League

=== League table ===
Pos	Team	Pld	W	D	L	GF	GA	GD	Pts	Promotion
1	Peterborough Sports	36	33	0	3	140	24	+116	99	Promoted to the Premier Division
2	Northampton ON Chenecks	36	24	6	6	89	40	+49	78	Promoted to the Premier Division
3	Stewarts & Lloyds Corby	36	22	6	8	72	40	+32	72	
4	Olney Town	36	19	5	12	89	73	+16	59 (Note: Olney Town were deducted three points for fielding an ineligible player against Rushden & Higham United on 8 August 2015.)	
5	Bourne Town	36	16	10	10	70	63	+7	58	
6	Long Buckby	36	17	6	13	70	51	+19	57	
7	Potton United	36	18	3	15	61	52	+9	57	
8	Raunds Town	36	15	10	11	69	69	0	55	
9	Thrapston Town	36	13	10	13	70	62	+8	49	
10	Blackstones	36	14	9	13	64	70	−6	48 (Note: Blackstones were deducted three points for fielding an ineligible player against Long Buckby on 16 April 2016.)	
11	Lutterworth Athletic	36	14	6	16	69	79	−10	48	
12	Oakham United	36	12	11	13	65	71	−6	47	
13	Rushden & Higham United	36	13	8	15	67	75	−8	47	
14	Woodford United	36	12	5	19	63	86	−23	41	
15	Wellingborough Whitworth	36	10	8	18	63	84	−21	38	
16	Irchester United	36	10	7	19	58	86	−28	37	
17	Buckingham Town	36	7	9	20	51	81	−30	30	
18	Bugbrooke St Michaels	36	5	8	23	38	86	−48	23	
19	Burton Park Wanderers	36	3	3	30	30	106	−76	12	
20	St Neots Town Saints	0	0	0	0	0	0	0	0	Club resigned, record expunged

Source: FA Full-Time fchd
Rules for classification: 1) points; 2) goal difference; 3) number of goals scored.

=== Results ===
All Games and results involving St Neots Town Saints have all been annulled.

Home \ Away	BLK	BOR	BUC	BUG	BPW	IRC	LBU	LUA	NOC	OAK	OLN	PSP	POT	RAU	RHU	STN	SLC	THR	WEW	WFU
Blackstones		2–2	1–1	3–1	1–0	4–2	0–2	0–3	3–3	3–3	6–1	0–9	2–2	0–0	1–1		3–2	2–4	0–0	4–1
Bourne Town	1–0		3–0	3–0	6–1	4–2	2–0	2–3	1–0	5–0	3–2	1–4	0–3	0–3	2–1		2–2	2–2	3–3	1–1
Buckingham Town	1–1	4–2		1–1	0–0	1–0	2–4	3–3	1–1	1–1	1–2	1–3	2–4	2–4	2–3		1–3	2–3	1–1	0–1
Bugbrooke St Michaels	1–2	1–2	0–1		2–1	2–3	0–2	1–1	0–3	1–3	0–2	1–6	2–1	0–0	2–3		0–2	2–2	1–1	2–0
Burton Park Wanderers	2–3	0–2	1–2	2–1		3–1	0–2	1–2	0–5	2–3	0–3	0–1	1–6	1–3	0–1		0–3	0–3	1–2	0–6
Irchester United	0–2	1–2	1–0	3–3	3–2		2–2	2–2	0–2	5–2	1–0	1–7	0–3	2–0	3–4		3–1	4–1	2–2	2–3
Long Buckby	1–2	1–1	1–1	2–1	4–0	3–0		6–0	2–3	3–1	1–1	3–0	1–0	4–0	4–1		0–1	1–1	1–3	1–2
Lutterworth Athletic	1–2	4–2	2–1	1–3	3–0	2–1	1–1		1–4	3–3	2–3	0–1	2–1	3–1	5–3		3–5	2–1	3–0	2–3
Northampton ON Chenecks	3–1	3–2	6–2	4–0	3–2	2–1	2–1	2–0		1–2	4–3	2–0	2–0	2–2	4–0		2–1	3–0	1–1	0–1
Oakham United	2–0	2–2	5–2	3–3	4–1	2–2	2–0	2–1	2–2		1–2	1–5	1–0	2–2	3–1		0–2	2–2	1–2	2–3
Olney Town	0–2	0–1	5–4	5–0	6–0	6–2	5–3	3–2	3–2	2–1		0–7	2–3	0–2	5–3		1–0	4–4	4–3	3–3
Peterborough Sports	2–1	5–0	7–0	6–1	5–2	9–0	5–0	5–1	2–1	2–0	2–0		2–0	5–1	3–0		1–0	1–0	5–1	7–0
Potton United	2–1	0–1	2–0	0–1	0–1	1–0	0–3	1–0	2–1	2–1	2–1	0–4		2–2	0–4		2–1	4–0	2–0	0–1
Raunds Town	3–2	5–2	1–3	3–3	3–0	4–3	1–5	1–1	0–0	4–0	1–5	1–1	5–4		4–3		1–1	1–2	2–0	3–2
Rushden & Higham United	1–2	2–2	3–2	4–1	1–1	1–3	0–1	2–1	0–3	2–0	1–1	0–3	2–2	0–0			1–2	3–2	2–2	3–2
St Neots Town Saints																				
Stewarts & Lloyds Corby	3–0	3–3	1–0	2–0	4–2	3–1	4–0	3–1	1–2	1–1	1–1	2–1	1–0	1–2	3–1			0–0	1–0	3–1
Thrapston Town	4–1	2–1	1–2	3–1	0–0	1–1	3–1	6–0	0–2	1–3	2–4	1–2	1–2	3–1	1–1		0–3		3–0	2–4
Wellingborough Whitworth	4–3	1–2	3–4	2–0	7–2	0–0	2–1	1–3	1–6	0–3	0–3	1–5	3–4	4–2	1–3		2–3	2–5		4–1
Woodford United	2–4	0–0	1–0	4–0	5–1	0–1	2–3	3–5	2–3	1–1	3–1	1–6	1–4	0–1	2–6		2–3	1–5	1–4	

Source: FA Full-Time (ChromaSport & Trophies United Counties League)
Legend: Blue = home team win; Yellow = draw; Red = away team win.
