= 2016–17 United Counties League =

The 2016–17 United Counties League season (known as the 2016–17 ChromaSport & Trophies United Counties League for sponsorship reasons) was the 110th in the history of the United Counties League, a football competition in England.

== Premier Division ==
United Counties League Premier Division
- Season: 2016–17
- Champions: Peterborough Sports
- Promoted: Peterborough Sports
- Relegated: Harrowby United; Huntingdon Town
- Matches: 462
- Goals: 1,777 (3.85 per match)

The Premier Division featured 20 clubs which competed in the division last season, along with two new clubs, promoted from Division One:

- Peterborough Sports
- Northampton ON Chenecks

=== League table ===
Pos	Team	Pld	W	D	L	GF	GA	GD	Pts	Promotion or relegation
1	Peterborough Sports	42	36	4	2	150	34	+116	112	Promoted to the Northern Premier League Division One South
2	Deeping Rangers	42	29	7	6	123	35	+88	94	
3	Yaxley	42	28	4	10	106	52	+54	88	
4	Desborough Town	42	25	9	8	89	53	+36	84	
5	Eynesbury Rovers	42	26	5	11	119	61	+58	83	
6	Wisbech Town	42	25	7	10	114	60	+54	82	
7	Holbeach United	42	22	7	13	99	72	+27	73	
8	Northampton Sileby Rangers	42	21	7	14	100	79	+21	70	
9	Wellingborough Town	42	19	8	15	75	85	−10	65	
10	Newport Pagnell Town	42	17	12	13	93	56	+37	63	
11	Harborough Town	42	17	7	18	83	77	+6	58	
12	Northampton ON Chenecks	42	16	7	19	72	89	−17	55	
13	Cogenhoe United	42	14	9	19	67	80	−13	51	
14	Sleaford Town	42	15	4	23	73	76	−3	49	
15	Peterborough Northern Star	42	13	9	20	50	66	−16	48	
16	Rothwell Corinthians	42	13	9	20	57	85	−28	48	
17	Leicester Nirvana	42	14	4	24	66	87	−21	46	
18	Kirby Muxloe	42	12	4	26	59	103	−44	40	
19	Oadby Town	42	10	7	25	62	117	−55	37	
20	Boston Town	42	8	10	24	48	94	−46	34	
21	Harrowby United	42	5	6	31	35	165	−130	20 (Note: Harrowby United were deducted one point for fielding an ineligible player against Oadby Town on 5 November 2016.)	Relegated to Division One
22	Huntingdon Town	42	2	4	36	37	151	−114	10	Relegated to Division One

Source: UCFL Tables fchd
Rules for classification: 1) Points; 2) Goal difference; 3) Number of goals scored; 4) Number of matches won; 5) Head-to-head results

==== Promotion criteria ====
To be promoted at the end of the season a team must:

1. Have applied to be considered for promotion by 30 November 2016
2. Pass a ground grading examination by 31 March 2017
3. Finish the season in a position higher than that of any other team also achieving criteria 1 and 2
4. Finish the season in one of the top three positions

The following three teams have achieved criterion one:

- Eynesbury Rovers
- Newport Pagnell Town
- Peterborough Sports

== Division One ==
United Counties League Division One
- Season: 2016–17
- Champions: Daventry Town
- Promoted: Daventry Town; Wellingborough Whitworth
- Matches: 342
- Goals: 1,438 (4.2 per match)

Division One featured 17 clubs which competed in the division last season, along with three new clubs:

- Daventry Town, voluntarily demoted from the Northern Premier League
- Melton Mowbray, promoted from the Leicestershire Senior League and changed name to Melton Town
- Whittlesey Athletic, promoted from the Peterborough and District League

=== League table ===
Pos	Team	Pld	W	D	L	GF	GA	GD	Pts	Promotion or qualification
1	Daventry Town	36	28	3	5	103	43	+60	87	Promoted to the Premier Division
2	Wellingborough Whitworth	36	24	6	6	120	65	+55	78	Promoted to the Premier Division
3	Bugbrooke St Michaels	36	24	4	8	113	53	+60	76	
4	Olney Town	36	22	7	7	101	49	+52	73	
5	Buckingham Town	36	21	5	10	106	58	+48	68	
6	Potton United	36	19	7	10	89	49	+40	64	
7	Raunds Town	36	19	6	11	72	47	+25	63	
8	Irchester United	36	19	4	13	85	62	+23	61	
9	Melton Town	36	18	3	15	97	73	+24	57	
10	Thrapston Town	36	16	7	13	63	64	−1	55	
11	Oakham United	36	15	6	15	63	75	−12	51	
12	Lutterworth Athletic	36	14	8	14	83	71	+12	50	
13	Long Buckby	36	14	5	17	71	78	−7	47	
14	Blackstones	36	13	7	16	66	77	−11	46	
15	Bourne Town	36	11	5	20	62	77	−15	38	
16	Rushden & Higham United	36	9	8	19	55	79	−24	35	
17	Woodford United	36	3	3	30	34	163	−129	12	Resigned to the Northamptonshire Combination
18	Stewarts & Lloyds Corby	36	3	0	33	35	127	−92	9	
19	Burton Park Wanderers	36	1	4	31	20	128	−108	7	
20	Whittlesey Athletic (Note: Whittlesey Athletic withdrawn from the league on 21 September due to ground grading, club record W=3 D=3 L=4 GF=28 GA=15 expunged.)	0	0	0	0	0	0	0	0	Resigned from the league

Source: UCFL Tables fchd
Rules for classification: 1) Points; 2) Goal difference; 3) Number of goals scored; 4) Number of matches won; 5) Head-to-head results
