= 2017–18 United Counties League =

The 2017–18 United Counties League season (known as the 2017–18 ChromaSport & Trophies United Counties League for sponsorship reasons) was the 111th in the history of the United Counties League, a football competition in England.

The constitution for Step 5 and Step 6 divisions for 2017–18 was announced on 26 May 2017.

== Premier Division ==
United Counties League Premier Division
- Season: 2017–18
- Champions: Yaxley
- Promoted: Yaxley; Wisbech Town
- Relegated: Northampton Sileby Rangers; St Andrews
- Matches: 462
- Goals: 1,722 (3.73 per match)

The Premier Division featured 19 clubs which competed in the division last season, along with three new clubs:

- Daventry Town, promoted from Division One
- St Andrews, transferred from the Midland League
- Wellingborough Whitworth, promoted from Division One

=== League table ===
Pos	Team	Pld	W	D	L	GF	GA	GD	Pts	Promotion or relegation
1	Yaxley	42	29	6	7	135	40	+95	93	Promoted to Southern League Division One Central
2	Wisbech Town	42	29	6	7	122	48	+74	93	Promoted to Northern Premier League Division One East (Note: 12 of the 14 runners-up at Step 5 were to have been promoted to Step 4. However, with resignations and mergers in leagues above, all fourteen runners-up were promoted.)
3	Newport Pagnell Town	42	28	6	8	104	49	+55	90	
4	Holbeach United	42	26	5	11	97	37	+60	83	
5	Deeping Rangers	42	24	9	9	101	42	+59	81	
6	Leicester Nirvana	42	22	8	12	104	58	+46	74	
7	Eynesbury Rovers	42	21	12	9	81	52	+29	72 (Note: Eynesbury Rovers were deducted three points for playing an ineligible player against Cogenhoe United on 16 January.)	
8	Cogenhoe United	42	22	5	15	73	57	+16	71	
9	Desborough Town	42	22	5	15	83	72	+11	71	
10	Daventry Town	42	19	10	13	70	60	+10	67	
11	Harborough Town	42	20	6	16	77	74	+3	66	
12	Kirby Muxloe	42	19	3	20	65	68	−3	60	
13	Boston Town	42	15	7	20	70	70	0	52	
14	Wellingborough Town	42	14	8	20	81	94	−13	50	
15	Rothwell Corinthians	42	14	8	20	59	79	−20	50	
16	Peterborough Northern Star	42	10	12	20	55	97	−42	42	
17	Northampton ON Chenecks	42	11	5	26	66	108	−42	38	
18	Sleaford Town	42	10	5	27	65	123	−58	35	
19	Oadby Town	42	7	12	23	50	95	−45	33	
20	Wellingborough Whitworth	42	9	6	27	59	105	−46	33	
21	St Andrews	42	10	3	29	49	117	−68	33	Relegated to Division One
22	Northampton Sileby Rangers	42	6	3	33	56	177	−121	21	Relegated to Division One

Source: UCFL Tables fchd
Rules for classification: 1) Points; 2) Goal difference; 3) Number of goals scored; 4) Number of matches won; 5) Head-to-head results

== Division One ==
United Counties League Division One
- Season: 2017–18
- Champions: Pinchbeck United
- Promoted: Pinchbeck United; Potton United
- Relegated: Oakham United; Stewarts & Lloyds Corby
- Matches: 380
- Goals: 1,536 (4.04 per match)

Division One featured 16 clubs which competed in the division last season, along with four new clubs:

- Harrowby United, relegated from the Premier Division
- Huntingdon Town, relegated from the Premier Division
- Lutterworth Town, promoted from the Leicestershire Senior League
- Pinchbeck United, promoted from the Peterborough & District League

=== League table ===
Pos	Team	Pld	W	D	L	GF	GA	GD	Pts	Promotion
1	Pinchbeck United	38	27	9	2	93	34	+59	90	Promoted to the Premier Division
2	Potton United	38	24	7	7	110	47	+63	79	Promoted to the Spartan South Midlands League
3	Lutterworth Town	38	23	7	8	115	48	+67	76	
4	Raunds Town	38	22	6	10	96	54	+42	72	
5	Harrowby United	38	20	5	13	92	57	+35	65	
6	Olney Town	38	19	8	11	80	64	+16	65	Club folded
7	Buckingham Town	38	19	6	13	91	78	+13	63	Transferred to the Spartan South Midlands League
8	Blackstones	38	18	7	13	90	71	+19	61	
9	Rushden & Higham United	38	17	9	12	90	67	+23	60	
10	Bourne Town	38	17	8	13	82	70	+12	59	
11	Lutterworth Athletic	38	17	6	15	68	72	−4	57	
12	Huntingdon Town	38	16	7	15	73	66	+7	55	
13	Irchester United	38	15	7	16	66	60	+6	52	
14	Burton Park Wanderers	38	13	7	18	72	110	−38	46	
15	Thrapston Town	38	13	6	19	72	75	−3	45	
16	Melton Town	38	10	7	21	64	95	−31	37	
17	Long Buckby	38	9	7	22	53	90	−37	34	
18	Bugbrooke St Michaels	38	8	7	23	58	101	−43	31	
19	Oakham United	38	6	2	30	42	123	−81	17 (Note: Oakham United were deducted 3 points for fielding an ineligible player)	Relegated to the Peterborough & District League
20	Stewarts & Lloyds Corby	38	2	2	34	29	154	−125	8	Relegated to the Northamptonshire Combination

Source: UCFL Tables fchd
Rules for classification: 1) Points; 2) Goal difference; 3) Number of goals scored; 4) Number of matches won; 5) Head-to-head results
