= 1979–80 FA Cup qualifying rounds =

Tournament details
- Country: England; Wales

The FA Cup 1979–80 is the 99th season of the world's oldest football knockout competition; The Football Association Challenge Cup, or FA Cup for short. The large number of clubs entering the tournament from lower down the English football league system meant that the competition started with a number of preliminary and qualifying rounds. The 28 victorious teams from the fourth round qualifying progressed to the first round proper.

== Preliminary round ==
=== Ties ===
Tie	Home team	Score	Away team
1	Bridlington Trinity	6–0	Appleby Frodingham
2	Brierley Hill Alliance	0–2	Belper Town
3	Cambridge City	1–2	Basildon United
4	Chalfont St Peter	0–1	Banbury United
5	Clapton	3–0	Basingstoke Town
6	Crook Town	5–2	Annfield Plain
7	Denaby United	0–2	Alfreton Town
8	Desborough Town	1–1	Bedworth United
9	Devizes Town	0–1	Cheltenham Town
10	Didcot Town	0–0	Alton Town
11	Dunstable	1–2	Carshalton Athletic
12	Eastwood Town	3–1	Ashby Institute
13	Egham Town	0–2	Addlestone
14	Emley	1–0	Barrow
15	Epping Town	2–2	Aveley
16	Epsom & Ewell	1–1	Arundel
17	Evenwood Town	1–2	Billingham Synthonia
18	Falmouth Town	1–2	Barnstaple Town
19	Farsley Celtic	0–2	Accrington Stanley
20	Faversham Town	0–2	Bromley
21	Ferryhill Athletic	2–1	Willington
22	Formby	2–2	Bangor City
23	Frome Town	0–1	Bideford
24	Gloucester City	0–2	Bridgend Town
25	Gosport Borough	2–1	Andover
26	Grays Athletic	0–2	Aylesbury United
27	Great Yarmouth Town	1–3	Chelmsford City
28	Guisborough Town	3–2	Blue Star
29	Halesowen Town	1–1	Alvechurch
30	Harefield United	1–4	Walton & Hersham
31	Haringey Borough	0–1	Willesden
32	Hastings United	0–4	Welling United
33	Haverhill Rovers	4–0	Wolverton Town
34	Heanor Town	0–5	Winterton Rangers
35	Herne Bay	0–2	Eastbourne Town
36	Hinckley Athletic w/o-scr Atherstone Town		
37	Histon	0–2	V S Rugby
38	Hoddesdon Town	1–2	Ruislip Manor
39	Holbeach United	2–2	Skegness Town
40	Horsham	2–1	Whitstable Town
41	Hyde United	1–3	Ashton United
42	Ilminster Town	0–0	Shepton Mallet Town
43	Lancaster City	3–1	Witton Albion
44	Leek Town	0–2	Tamworth
45	Leyton Wingate	3–1	Barton Rovers
46	Long Eaton United	3–1	Tividale
47	Lowestoft Town	1–2	Harlow Town
48	Lytham	1–1	Rossendale United
49	Marlow	2–3	Bracknell Town
50	Melksham Town	1–3	Trowbridge Town
51	Mexborough Town Athletic	6–1	Yorkshire Amateur
52	Milton Keynes City	4–1	Wokingham Town
53	Moreton Town	0–2	Ton Pentre
54	New Brighton	1–7	Macclesfield Town
55	Newmarket Town	1–3	Sudbury Town
56	Newport I O W	4–0	Selsey
57	Normanby Park Works	1–3	Whitby Town
58	Oswestry Town	1–0	Radcliffe Borough
59	Pagham	0–0	Wigmore Athletic
60	Peacehaven & Telscombe	0–0	Ashford Town (Kent)
61	Potton United	1–1	Chatteris Town
62	Ramsgate	3–1	Snowdown Colliery Welfare
63	Rhyl	1–5	Winsford United
64	Rothwell Town	0–2	Willenhall Town
65	Shildon	2–2	Wingate (Durham)
66	South Bank	4–1	Whitley Bay
67	Southwick	2–3	Worthing
68	Spalding United	1–3	Wisbech Town
69	Staines Town	0–1	Wellingborough Town
70	Walthamstow Avenue	4–2	Windsor & Eton
71	Weston Super Mare	2–0	Llanelli

=== Replays ===
Tie	Home team	Score	Away team
8	Bedworth United	6–0	Desborough Town
10	Alton Town	0–2	Didcot Town
15	Aveley	0–1	Epping Town
16	Arundel	0–1	Epsom & Ewell
22	Bangor City	0–1	Formby
29	Alvechurch	6–0	Halesowen Town
39	Skegness Town	2–1	Holbeach United
42	Shepton Mallet Town	0–1	Ilminster Town
48	Rossendale United	4–0	Lytham
59	Wigmore Athletic	0–2	Pagham
60	Ashford Town (Kent)	2–1	Peacehaven & Telscombe
61	Chatteris Town	1–2	Potton United
65	Wingate (Durham)	4–3	Shildon

== 1st qualifying round ==
=== Ties ===
Tie	Home team	Score	Away team
1	Arnold	2–3	Worksop Town
2	Banstead Athletic	0–2	Sutton United
3	Barry Town	2–1	Bath City
4	Barton Town	0–1	Goole Town
5	Berkhamsted Town	1–4	Bedford Town
6	Bexhill Town	0–2	Croydon
7	Bilston	1–2	Telford United
8	Bishop's Stortford	1–2	Billericay Town
9	Bognor Regis Town	5–0	Redhill
10	Boldon Community Association	0–1	Ashington
11	Bourne Town	0–2	Boston
12	Brandon United	3–2	Spennymoor United
13	Bridgwater Town	0–0	Yeovil Town
14	Bromsgrove Rovers	0–1	Dudley Town
15	Buckingham Town	0–7	Hendon
16	Burscough	6–1	Chorley
17	Buxton	3–1	Matlock Town
18	Caernarfon Town	0–0	Northwich Victoria
19	Camberley Town	1–2	Waterlooville
20	Canterbury City	1–1	Dulwich Hamlet
21	Carlisle City	2–2	Bishop Auckland
22	Chatham Town	2–2	Horsham
23	Chertsey Town	0–1	Hillingdon Borough
24	Chesham United	2–0	Boreham Wood
25	Cheshunt	1–5	Barking
26	Chippenham Town	0–3	Merthyr Tydfil
27	Cinderford Town	1–2	Redditch United
28	Clacton Town	0–2	Bury Town
29	Clitheroe	0–2	Droylsden
30	Corby Town	1–0	Irthlingborough Diamonds
31	Corinthian Casuals	1–6	Woking
32	Coventry Sporting	1–0	Belper Town
33	Crawley Town	0–0	Slough Town
34	Darlaston	1–2	Hednesford Town
35	Dorchester Town	2–0	Wadebridge Town
36	Dorking Town	1–1	Eastbourne United
37	Easington Colliery Welfare	0–4	Consett
38	East Grinstead	1–4	Gravesend & Northfleet
39	Ely City	1–2	Boston United
40	Enderby Town	5–0	Saffron Walden Town
41	Erith & Belvedere	0–0	Burgess Hill Town
42	Farnborough Town	0–1	Cray Wanderers
43	Felixstowe Town	3–2	March Town United
44	Feltham	1–2	Burnham
45	Fleetwood Town	1–4	Mossley
46	Forest Green Rovers	3–2	Clandown
47	Frickley Athletic	5–0	Bridlington Town
48	Gainsborough Trinity	1–1	Brigg Town
49	Gateshead	2–2	Crook Town
50	Glastonbury	2–1	Bridport
51	Gresley Rovers	1–3	Burton Albion
52	Hampton	2–1	Finchley
53	Harrow Borough	1–3	Witney Town
54	Harwich & Parkeston	2–0	Basildon United
55	Hayes	2–0	Aylesbury United
56	Haywards Heath	0–3	Dover
57	Hemel Hempstead	1–2	Edgware Town
58	Hertford Town	3–1	Banbury United
59	Highgate United	0–2	Brereton Social
60	Horden Colliery Welfare	6–0	Durham City
61	Hornchurch	0–3	Harlow Town
62	Horsham Y M C A	4–2	Chichester City
63	Horwich R M I	4–1	Darwen
64	Hounslow	2–0	Carshalton Athletic
65	Hungerford Town	3–1	Calne Town
66	Kidderminster Harriers	2–0	Friar Lane Old Boys
67	King's Lynn	2–0	Gorleston
68	Kingstonian	2–0	Ruislip Manor
69	Letchworth Garden City	1–1	Haverhill Rovers
70	Lewes	2–1	Folkestone & Shepway
71	Leyland Motors	1–4	Curzon Ashton
72	Liskeard Athletic	3–1	Bideford
73	Littlehampton Town	0–8	Fareham Town
74	Louth United	2–2	Alfreton Town
75	Lye Town	1–1	Alvechurch
76	Maidenhead United	1–0	Clapton
77	Mangotsfield United	2–6	Clevedon Town
78	Margate	4–1	Bromley
79	Marine	4–0	Congleton Town
80	Metropolitan Police	1–1	Willesden
81	Molesey	2–3	Addlestone
82	Moor Green	2–1	Tamworth
83	Nantwich Town	2–0	Colwyn Bay
84	Netherfield	4–0	Accrington Stanley
85	New Mills	1–2	Glossop
86	Newbury Town	2–1	Didcot Town
87	North Ferriby United	2–1	Eastwood Town
88	North Shields	4–2	Ferryhill Athletic
89	Oldbury United	0–1	Long Eaton United
90	Olney Town	0–4	Bedworth United
91	Oxford City	0–0	Bridgend Town
92	Parson Drove United	2–0	Chelmsford City
93	Paulton Rovers	0–2	Cheltenham Town
94	Penrith	0–1	Rossendale United
95	Penzance	1–4	Newquay
96	Peterlee Newtown	2–1	Eppleton Colliery Welfare
97	Poole Town	3–1	Epsom & Ewell
98	Porthmadog	0–2	Formby
99	Prescot Town	1–0	Emley
100	Prestwich Heys	0–1	Oswestry Town
101	Racing Club Warwick	1–1	Gornal Athletic
102	Rainham Town	2–2	Walton & Hersham
103	Retford Town	0–3	Skegness Town
104	Ringmer	3–3	Eastbourne Town
105	Rushden Town	2–3	Hinckley Athletic
106	Salisbury	4–3	Newport I O W
107	Saltash United	3–0	Ilminster Town
108	Selby Town	0–1	Bridlington Trinity
109	Sheppey United	1–1	Ramsgate
110	Sittingbourne	2–2	Welling United
111	Skelmersdale United	1–4	Lancaster City
112	Soham Town Rangers	0–0	V S Rugby
113	South Liverpool	2–2	Winsford United
114	Southall & Ealing Borough	0–3	Leytonstone & Ilford
115	St Albans City	0–2	Kempston Rovers
116	St Blazey	0–2	Barnstaple Town
117	St Helens Town	1–2	Macclesfield Town
118	St Neots Town	4–2	Grantham
119	Stalybridge Celtic	1–2	Ashton United
120	Stamford	2–0	Potton United
121	Stourbridge	2–1	Ton Pentre
122	Stowmarket	0–1	Sudbury Town
123	Sutton Coldfield Town	3–2	Willenhall Town
124	Sutton Town	2–0	Winterton Rangers
125	Swaythling	1–4	Gosport Borough
126	Taunton Town	0–1	Trowbridge Town
127	Thackley	2–2	Whitby Town
128	Thame United	6–5	Bracknell Town
129	Thetford Town	1–2	Wisbech Town
130	Three Bridges	0–2	Ashford Town (Kent)
131	Tilbury	3–0	Epping Town
132	Tiverton Town	2–1	Chard Town
133	Tonbridge	2–3	Worthing
134	Tow Law Town	1–0	Guisborough Town
135	Tring Town	2–1	Wellingborough Town
136	Tunbridge Wells	2–2	Pagham
137	Uxbridge	1–0	Milton Keynes City
138	Wallsend Town	1–4	Billingham Synthonia
139	Ware	2–1	Leyton Wingate
140	Washington	3–2	Wingate (Durham)
141	Welton Rovers	0–4	Weston Super Mare
142	Wembley	0–1	Walthamstow Avenue
143	West Auckland Town	1–3	South Bank
144	Worsbrough Bridge Miners Welfare	0–2	Mexborough Town Athletic

=== Replays ===
Tie	Home team	Score	Away team
13	Yeovil Town	2–0	Bridgwater Town
18	Northwich Victoria	3–1	Caernarfon Town
20	Dulwich Hamlet	4–0	Canterbury City
21	Bishop Auckland	2–2	Carlisle City
22	Horsham	1–2	Chatham Town
33	Slough Town	3–0	Crawley Town
36	Eastbourne United	4–1	Dorking Town
41	Burgess Hill Town	0–0	Erith & Belvedere (Abandoned in extra time)
48	Brigg Town	1–5	Gainsborough Trinity
49	Crook Town	2–0	Gateshead
69	Haverhill Rovers	1–0	Letchworth Garden City
74	Alfreton Town	4–2	Louth United
75	Alvechurch	1–2	Lye Town
80	Willesden	1–1	Metropolitan Police
91	Bridgend Town	5–2	Oxford City
101	Gornal Athletic	2–3	Racing Club Warwick
102	Walton & Hersham	5–2	Rainham Town
104	Eastbourne Town	2–0	Ringmer
109	Ramsgate	5–2	Sheppey United
110	Welling United	5–0	Sittingbourne
112	V S Rugby	3–0	Soham Town Rangers
113	Winsford United	3–1	South Liverpool
127	Whitby Town	2–0	Thackley
136	Pagham	1–2	Tunbridge Wells

=== 2nd replay ===
Tie	Home team	Score	Away team
21	Carlisle City	0–5	Bishop Auckland
41	Erith & Belvedere	2–0	Burgess Hill Town
80	Willesden	0–3	Metropolitan Police

== 2nd qualifying round ==
=== Ties ===
Tie	Home team	Score	Away team
1	Addlestone	0–0	Sutton United
2	Alfreton Town	3–1	Worksop Town
3	Ashford Town (Kent)	0–2	Croydon
4	Ashton United	1–1	Buxton
5	Barnstaple Town	0–0	Dorchester Town
6	Bedworth United	1–0	Corby Town
7	Billingham Synthonia	0–1	Bishop Auckland
8	Bridgend Town	0–0	Redditch United
9	Bridlington Trinity	0–2	Goole Town
10	Chatham Town	1–1	Dover
11	Cheltenham Town	0–2	Merthyr Tydfil
12	Coventry Sporting	2–4	Telford United
13	Crook Town	2–3	Ashington
14	Eastbourne Town	0–2	Gravesend & Northfleet
15	Formby	1–1	Northwich Victoria
16	Gosport Borough	1–0	Eastbourne United
17	Harlow Town	2–1	Bury Town
18	Harwich & Parkeston	3–1	Billericay Town
19	Haverhill Rovers	0–0	Chesham United
20	Hayes	2–4	Slough Town
21	Hertford Town	0–2	Bedford Town
22	Hinckley Athletic	2–1	Dudley Town
23	Hounslow	2–3	Woking
24	Kingstonian	1–0	Cray Wanderers
25	Lancaster City	4–0	Horwich R M I
26	Liskeard Athletic	0–1	Yeovil Town
27	Long Eaton United	0–1	Kidderminster Harriers
28	Lye Town	1–0	Hednesford Town
29	Macclesfield Town	0–0	Mossley
30	Maidenhead United	2–2	Hendon
31	Margate	1–0	Dulwich Hamlet
32	Metropolitan Police	1–1	Burnham
33	Mexborough Town Athletic	0–1	Marine
34	Moor Green	2–1	Brereton Social
35	Netherfield	0–2	Burscough
36	Newbury Town	1–2	Barry Town
37	North Ferriby United	1–3	Boston
38	North Shields	3–0	Consett
39	Oswestry Town	2–0	Nantwich Town
40	Parson Drove United	2–0	Felixstowe Town
41	Poole Town	0–0	Waterlooville
42	Prescot Town	2–2	Droylsden
43	Ramsgate	1–0	Lewes
44	Rossendale United	2–0	Curzon Ashton
45	Salisbury	3–1	Horsham Y M C A
46	Saltash United	4–0	Glastonbury
47	Skegness Town	2–0	Gainsborough Trinity
48	South Bank	3–2	Peterlee Newtown
49	Stamford	0–5	Boston United
50	Stourbridge	2–3	Clevedon Town
51	Sudbury Town	1–2	King's Lynn
52	Sutton Coldfield Town	3–0	Racing Club Warwick
53	Sutton Town	1–1	Burton Albion
54	Thame United	0–1	Witney Town
55	Tilbury	0–1	Barking
56	Tiverton Town	3–3	Newquay
57	Tow Law Town	0–4	Brandon United
58	Tring Town	5–0	Kempston Rovers
59	Trowbridge Town	0–2	Hungerford Town
60	Tunbridge Wells	1–2	Fareham Town
61	Uxbridge	0–2	Edgware Town
62	V S Rugby	0–1	Enderby Town
63	Walthamstow Avenue	2–2	Leytonstone & Ilford
64	Walton & Hersham	1–1	Hampton
65	Ware	1–1	Hillingdon Borough
66	Washington	0–5	Horden Colliery Welfare
67	Welling United	1–0	Erith & Belvedere
68	Weston Super Mare	3–1	Forest Green Rovers
69	Whitby Town	3–2	Frickley Athletic
70	Winsford United	2–0	Glossop
71	Wisbech Town	5–2	St Neots Town
72	Worthing	1–2	Bognor Regis Town

=== Replays ===
Tie	Home team	Score	Away team
1	Sutton United	0–3	Addlestone
4	Buxton	1–1	Ashton United
5	Dorchester Town	1–3	Barnstaple Town
8	Redditch United	2–3	Bridgend Town
10	Dover	0–1	Chatham Town
15	Northwich Victoria	2–0	Formby
19	Chesham United	3–0	Haverhill Rovers
29	Dudley Town	1–0	Hinckley Athletic
29	Mossley	3–2	Macclesfield Town
30	Hendon	0–3	Maidenhead United
32	Burnham	3–3	Metropolitan Police
41	Waterlooville	0–2	Poole Town
42	Droylsden	1–0	Prescot Town
53	Burton Albion	3–2	Sutton Town
56	Newquay	0–1	Tiverton Town
63	Leytonstone & Ilford	3–1	Walthamstow Avenue
64	Hampton	1–5	Walton & Hersham
65	Hillingdon Borough	3–0	Ware

=== 2nd replays ===
Tie	Home team	Score	Away team
4	Ashton United	2–2	Buxton
41	Metropolitan Police	1–0	Burnham

=== 3rd replay ===
Tie	Home team	Score	Away team
4	Buxton	1–3	Ashton United

== 3rd qualifying round ==
=== Ties ===
Tie	Home team	Score	Away team
1	Bognor Regis Town	0–1	Croydon
2	Burton Albion	2–0	Alfreton Town
3	Chatham Town	0–1	Margate
4	Chesham United	0–0	Bedford Town
5	Clevedon Town	0–2	Bridgend Town
6	Edgware Town	0–3	Barking
7	Enderby Town	0–0	Bedworth United
8	Fareham Town	1–0	Gosport Borough
9	Harlow Town	1–0	Harwich & Parkeston
10	Horden Colliery Welfare	4–1	Bishop Auckland
11	Hungerford Town	3–1	Barry Town
12	Kidderminster Harriers	2–1	Lye Town
13	King's Lynn	0–1	Parson Drove United
14	Kingstonian	0–2	Woking
15	Lancaster City	0–0	Droylsden
16	Leytonstone & Ilford	2–1	Hillingdon Borough
17	Marine	4–0	Ashton United
18	Metropolitan Police	0–1	Maidenhead United
19	Moor Green	2–1	Telford United
20	North Shields	2–1	Ashington
21	Oswestry Town	1–1	Northwich Victoria
22	Ramsgate	2–2	Gravesend & Northfleet
23	Rossendale United	0–4	Burscough
24	Salisbury	3–0	Poole Town
25	Saltash United	3–3	Yeovil Town
26	Skegness Town	1–1	Boston
27	South Bank	1–2	Brandon United
28	Sutton Coldfield Town	4–1	Dudley Town
29	Tiverton Town	2–1	Barnstaple Town
30	Tring Town	0–2	Witney Town
31	Walton & Hersham	0–2	Slough Town
32	Welling United	3–1	Addlestone
33	Weston Super Mare	2–2	Merthyr Tydfil
34	Whitby Town	2–2	Goole Town
35	Winsford United	0–1	Mossley
36	Wisbech Town	1–5	Boston United

=== Replays ===
Tie	Home team	Score	Away team
4	Bedford Town	0–1	Chesham United
7	Bedworth United	0–1	Enderby Town
15	Droylsden	2–0	Lancaster City
21	Northwich Victoria	4–1	Oswestry Town
22	Gravesend & Northfleet	2–1	Ramsgate
25	Yeovil Town	2–1	Saltash United
26	Boston	2–2	Skegness Town
33	Merthyr Tydfil	3–1	Weston Super Mare
34	Goole Town	2–1	Whitby Town

=== 2nd replay ===
Tie	Home team	Score	Away team
26	Boston	1–0	Skegness Town

== 4th qualifying round ==
The teams that given byes to this round are Worcester City, Maidstone United, Weymouth, AP Leamington, Nuneaton Borough, Barnet, Wealdstone, Leatherhead, Wycombe Wanderers, Southport, Workington, Dagenham, Morecambe, Dartford, Hitchin Town, Tooting & Mitcham United, Minehead, Enfield, Blyth Spartans and Runcorn.

=== Ties ===
Tie	Home team	Score	Away team
1	Barnet	0–2	Wycombe Wanderers
2	Blyth Spartans	2–2	Marine
3	Boston	2–2	AP Leamington
4	Boston United	1–1	Nuneaton Borough
5	Bridgend Town	1–1	Hungerford Town
6	Burton Albion	1–0	Parson Drove United
7	Chesham United	3–1	Maidstone United
8	Dagenham	2–4	Barking
9	Dartford	0–2	Leytonstone & Ilford
10	Enderby Town	0–1	Northwich Victoria
11	Gravesend & Northfleet	2–1	Welling United
12	Harlow Town	1–0	Margate
13	Hitchin Town	1–2	Enfield
14	Horden Colliery Welfare	0–2	Burscough
15	Leatherhead	1–1	Croydon
16	Merthyr Tydfil	2–1	Maidenhead United
17	Minehead	1–0	Witney Town
18	Moor Green	2–0	Runcorn
19	Morecambe	3–2	Droylsden
20	Mossley	2–1	Goole Town
21	North Shields	1–2	Brandon United
22	Salisbury	2–1	Worcester City
23	Slough Town	4–0	Tooting & Mitcham United
24	Southport	1–3	Workington
25	Sutton Coldfield Town	3–3	Kidderminster Harriers
26	Tiverton Town	1–2	Fareham Town
27	Wealdstone	1–0	Woking
28	Yeovil Town	2–1	Weymouth

=== Replays ===
Tie	Home team	Score	Away team
2	Marine	0–5	Blyth Spartans
3	AP Leamington	1–0	Boston
4	Nuneaton Borough	2–1	Boston United
5	Hungerford Town	5–0	Bridgend Town
15	Croydon	3–0	Leatherhead
25	Kidderminster Harriers	3–2	Sutton Coldfield Town

== 1979–80 FA Cup ==
See 1979-80 FA Cup for details of the rounds from the first round proper onwards.
