= Oakham United F.C. =

Oakham United may refer to:

- Oakham United F.C. (Nottinghamshire) (1969–1996)
- Oakham United F.C. (Rutland) (founded 2011)
