= Sutton F.C. =

Sutton F.C. can refer to several English non-league football teams:

- Bishop Sutton A.F.C.
- Long Sutton Athletic F.C.
- Mole Valley Sutton Common Rovers F.C.
- Sutton Athletic F.C.
- Sutton Coldfield Town F.C.
- Sutton Town A.F.C.
- Sutton United F.C.
