= Pinchbeck United F.C. =

Association football club in England

Coordinates: 52°47′24″N 0°9′9″W

Pinchbeck United
- Full name: Pinchbeck United Football Club9
- Nickname: The Knights
- Founded: 1935
- Ground: Eslaforde Park, Sleaford
- Capacity: 1,000
- Chairman: Gary Coomes
- Manager: Lewis Thorogood
- League: United Counties League Division One
- 2025–26: United Counties League Division One, 21st of 23
Home colours

Pinchbeck United Football Club is a football club based in Pinchbeck, Lincolnshire, England. They are currently members of the United Counties League Division One and play at Eslaforde Park in Sleaford.

== History ==
Established in 1935, the club joined the Premier Division of the Peterborough & District League in 1958. They were Premier Division champions in 1989–90, retaining the title the following season. In 2003–04 the club finished bottom of the Premier Division, but were not relegated to Division One. They were champions again in 2011–12, also winning the Peterborough Senior Cup. After finishing as runners-up in 2016–17, the club were promoted to Division One of the United Counties League. As a result of their promotion, the club moved first team matches to Spalding United's Sir Halley Stewart Field, with the reserves remaining at their Knight Street ground.

In 2017–18 Pinchbeck were Division One champions, earning promotion to the Premier Division. When the Premier Division was split in 2021, the club were placed in the Premier Division North. In 2023–24 the club were relegated to Division One North of the Eastern Counties Football League. At the end of the 2024–25 season they were transferred to Division One of the United Counties League.

== Honours ==
- United Counties League
  - Division One champions 2017–18
- Peterborough & District League
  - Premier Division champions 1989–90, 1990–91, 2011–12
  - Presidents Premier Shield winners 2015–16, 2016–17
- Peterborough Senior Cup
  - Winners 2011–12

== Records ==
- Best FA Cup performance: Preliminary round, 2022–23
- Best FA Vase performance: Fourth round, 2022–23
- Record attendance: 265 vs Holbeach United, FA Vase first qualifying round, 8 September 2017
