= Huntingdon Town F.C. =

Association football club in England

Coordinates: 52°21′30″N 0°09′58″W

Huntingdon Town
- Full name: Huntingdon Town Football Club
- Nickname: The Hunters
- Founded: 1980
- Ground: Jubilee Park, Huntingdon
- League: Spartan South Midlands League Division One
- 2025–26: Spartan South Midlands League Division One, 19th of 21
Home colours	Away colours

Huntingdon Town Football Club is a football club based in Huntingdon, Cambridgeshire, England. They are currently members of the Spartan South Midlands League Division One and play at Jubilee Park.

== History ==
The original Huntingdon Town was formed in the 1800s and won the Huntingdonshire Senior Cup eleven times before World War I. They joined the Peterborough & District League in 1922. Although they left the league in 1926, they returned the following year. Their second spell in the league ended in 1932, although they returned again in 1935. They remained in the league until merging with Huntingdon Wanderers to form Huntingdon United in 1948.

The modern club was established in 1980 as Montagu Football Club. They were later renamed Sun Football Club, before adopting their current name when transferring from the West Anglian League to Division 2B of the Cambridgeshire League in 1996. They were promoted to Division 1B at the end of the 1997–98 season, and went on to win the division in 1999–2000, as well as the Hunts Junior Cup, which they retained for the next two seasons. In 2001–02 the club were runners-up in the Senior B Division.

In 2003 Huntingdon moved up to Division One of the United Counties League when they moved to Jubilee Park. They were Division One champions in 2011–12, earning promotion to the Premier Division. In 2013–14 the club were Premier Division runners-up and won the League Cup. However, they finished bottom of the Premier Division in 2015–16 but were reprieved from relegation as two clubs left the league. However, after finishing bottom again the following season, the club were relegated to Division One. At the end of the 2020–21 season they were transferred to Division One North of the Eastern Counties League. After the 2022–23 season the club were moved to Division One of the Spartan South Midlands League.

== Ground ==
The club moved to Jubilee Park in 2003. Floodlights were installed in July 2004 and inaugurated with a friendly match against Peterborough United. A new clubhouse was opened in 2009, and a 50-seat stand built during the 2011–12 season. Another 50-seat stand was opened during the following season.

== Honours ==
- United Counties League
  - Division One champions 2011–12
  - League Cup winners 2013–14
- Cambridgeshire League
  - Division 1B Champions 1999–2000
- Hinchingbrooke Cup
  - Winners 2013–14
- Hunts Junior Cup
  - Winners 1999–2000, 2000–01, 2001–02
- Hunts Scott Gatty Cup
  - Winners 2001–02

== Records ==
- Best FA Cup performance: First qualifying round, 2011–12, 2012–13, 2013–14
- Best FA Vase performance: Third round, 2013–14

== See also ==
- Huntingdon Town F.C. players
