= Huntingdonshire Senior Cup =

English football tournament

- Organiser(s): Huntingdonshire FA
- Founded: 1888; 138 years ago
- Region: Huntingdonshire
- Current champions: St Neots Town (30th title)
- Most championships: St Neots Town (30 titles)

The Huntingdonshire Senior Cup is the second level football cup competition organised by the Huntingdonshire Football Association below the Huntingdonshire Premier Cup. The cup was first played for during the 1888–89 season, when it was won by St Neots.

== Past finals ==
Season	Winners	Score	Runners–up
1888–89	St Neots		
1889–90	Huntingdon Town		
1890–91	Huntingdon Town		
1891–92	Huntingdon Town		
1892–93	St Neots		
1893-94	Cup withheld		
1894–95	St Neots		
1895–96	St Neots		
1896–97	St Neots		
1897–98	Huntingdon Town		
1898–99	Huntingdon Town		
1899–1900	Farcet United		
1900–01	St Ives Town		
1901–02	St Neots		
1902–03	Huntingdon Town		
1903–04	Fletton United		
1904–05	Fletton United		
1905–06	Huntingdon Town		
1906–07	Fletton United		
1907–08	Huntingdon Town		
1908–09	Huntingdon Town		
1909–10	Ramsey Town		
1910–11	Huntingdon Town		
1911–12	St Ives Town		
1912–13	Huntingdon Town		
1913–14	Eynesbury Rovers		
1915-18	No cup due to World War I		
1919–20	Godmanchester Town		
1920–21	Godmanchester Town		
1921–22	Godmanchester Town		
1922–23	St Ives Town		
1923–24	Godmanchester Town		
1924–25	St Neots & District		
1925–26	St Ives Town		
1926–27	Warboys Town		
1927–28	St Neots & District		
1928–29	Warboys Town		
1929–30	St Ives Town		
1930–31	London Brick Sports		
1931–32	Warboys Town		
1932–33	Warboys Town		
1933–34	Phorpres Sports		
1934–35	Phorpres Sports		
1935–36	St Neots & District		
1936–37	St Neots & District		
1937–38	St Neots & District		
1938–39	St Neots & District		
1940-45	No cup due to World War II		
1945–46			
1946–47	Eynesbury Rovers		
1947–48	St Neots St Marys		
1948–49	Eynesbury Rovers		
1949–50	Eynesbury Rovers		
1950–51	Eynesbury Rovers		
1951–52	RAF Brampton		
1952–53	RAF Brampton		
1953–54	St Neots & District		
1954–55	Eynesbury Rovers	5–0	St Neots & District
1955–56	St Neots & District		Eynesbury Rovers
Replay	St Neots & District	3–0	Eynesbury Rovers
1956–57	Eynesbury Rovers	1–0	Somersham Town
1957–58	St Neots Town		
1958–59	St Neots Town		
1959–60	St Neots Town		
1960–61	St Neots Town		
1961–62	St Neots Town		
1962–63	St Neots Town		
1963–64	St Neots Town		
1964–65	St Neots Town		
1965–66	St Neots Town		
1966–67	St Neots Town		
1967–68	St Neots Town		
1968–69	St Neots Town		
1969–70	Eynesbury Rovers	1–0	St Neots Town
1970–71	St Neots Town	5–1	Huntingdon United
1971–72	St Neots Town	2–1	Warboys Town
1972–73	Somersham Town		
1973–74	St Neots Town		
1974–75	Yaxley		
1975–76	Yaxley		
1976–77	St Neots Town		
1977–78	St Neots Town		
1978–79	Phorpres Sports		
1979–80	St Neots Town		
1980–81	St Neots Town		
1981–82	St Ives Town		
1982–83	Yaxley		
1983–84	Yaxley		
1984–85	Eynesbury Rovers		
1985–86	Ramsey Town		
1986–87	St Ives Town		
1987–88	St Ives Town		
1988–89	LBC Ortonians		
1989–90	Ramsey Town		
1990–91	Eynesbury Rovers	1–0	Somersham Town
1991–92	Eynesbury Rovers		
1992–93	Eynesbury Rovers	4–2	Warboys Town
1993–94	Somersham Town	1–0	Ortonians
1994–95	Warboys Town	2–1	Godmanchester Rovers
1995–96	Eynesbury Rovers	3–2	Warboys Town
1996–97	Ortonians		
1997–98	St Neots Town		
1998–99	Yaxley		
1999–2000	Eynesbury Rovers	2–1	Somersham Town
2000–01	Somersham Town	1–0	St Neots Town
2001–02	Eynesbury Rovers		
2002–03	Hotpoint		
2003–04	Yaxley		
2004–05	Yaxley	4–0	Ortonians
2005–06	Ortonians	1–0	St Neots Town
2006–07	St Ives Town	2–0	Hampton Athletic
2007–08	Yaxley	1–1	St Ives Town
2007–08	Yaxley win on penalties		
2008–09	St Ives Town	3–0	AFC Fletton
2009–10	St Neots Town	1–0	Yaxley
2010–11	St Neots Town	2–0	St Ives Town
2011–12	St Ives Town	3-1	Godmanchester Rovers
2012–13	St Ives Town	0–0	Huntingdon Town
2012–13	St Ives 4–2 win on penalties		
2013–14	St Neots Town	2–0	St Ives Town
2014–15	Godmanchester Rovers	3–0	Yaxley
2015–16	St Ives Town	2–0	Eynesbury Rovers
2016–17	Eynesbury Rovers	1–0	St Neots Town
2017–18	St Neots Town	6–1	Eynesbury Rovers
2018–19	Godmanchester Rovers	6–0	St Neots Town
2019–20	Competition cancelled due to COVID-19 pandemic		
2020–21	Competition cancelled due to COVID-19 pandemic		
2021–22	St Ives Town	2–0	Godmanchester Rovers
2022–23	St Ives Town	0–0	Yaxley
2022–23	St Ives 3–1 win on penalties		
2023–24	St Ives Town	2–0	Godmanchester Rovers
2024–25	St Neots Town	2–2	St Ives Town
2024–25	St Neots 6–5 win on penalties		
2025–26	Eaton Socon	24 March 2026	St Neots Town
