= Barleythorpe =

Village and civil parish in Rutland, England

Coordinates: 52.68°N 0.74°W

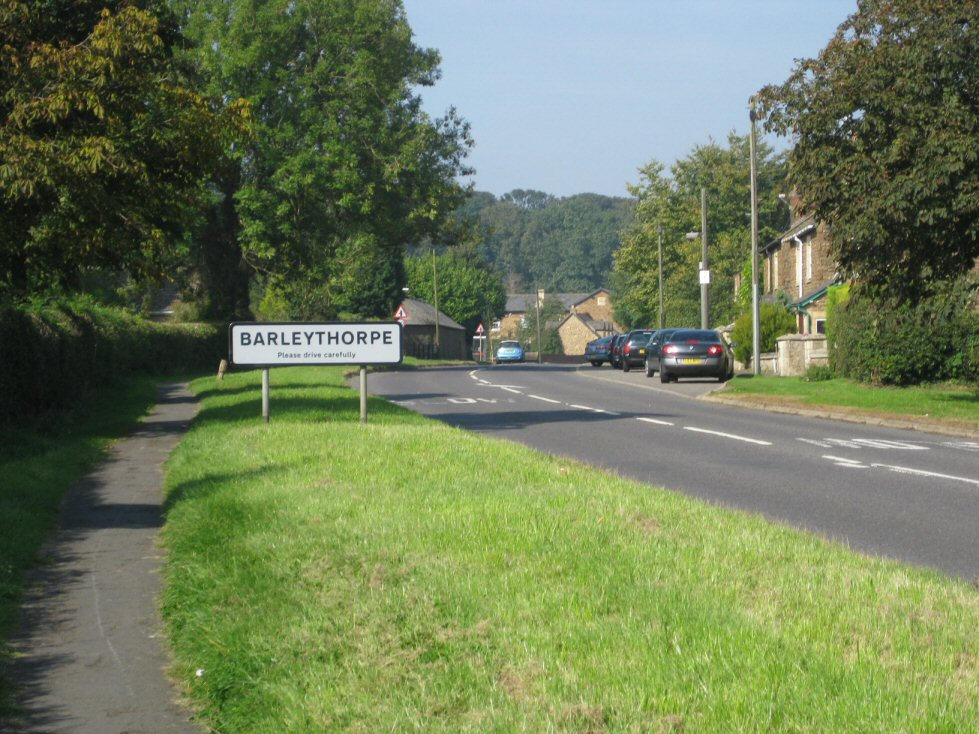
- Main Street

- Location within Rutland
- Area: 1.6 sq mi (4.1 km^{2})
- Population: 178 2001 Census
  - Density: 111/sq mi (43/km^{2})
- OS grid reference: SK849096
  - London: 86 miles (138 km) SSE
- Unitary authority: Rutland
- Shire county: Rutland
- Ceremonial county: Rutland
- Region: East Midlands
- Country: England
- Sovereign state: United Kingdom
- Post town: OAKHAM
- Postcode district: LE15
- Dialling code: 01572
- Police: Leicestershire
- Fire: Leicestershire
- Ambulance: East Midlands
- UK Parliament: Rutland and Stamford

Barleythorpe is a village and civil parish in the county of Rutland in the East Midlands of England. It is located about a mile (1.6 km) north-west of Oakham. The population at the 2001 census was 178, increasing to 207 at the 2011 census.

The village's name means 'Outlying farm/settlement'. 'Barley' comes from the later addition of the family name 'le Bolour' which is often confused with the crop.

Barleythorpe Hall was a home of Lord Lonsdale until 1926. After being sold by Lord Lonsdale to Lawrence Kimball, the Hall burned down in 1934 and was rebuilt in a more modern style. It was later an elderly person's home from 1970 until 2006. It was sold to Hazelton Homes, who in 2018, transformed the building into luxury apartments.

Alongside was the training and conference centre of EEF East Midlands and Mid-Anglia which was sold to Rutland County Council in 2011. The building was refurbished and let to Rutland County College and Oakham United Football Club. In August 2017 the college moved back to their main site at Great Casterton and Rutland County Council opened a serviced business centre called The King Centre, named after former Leader of Rutland County Council, Terry King, who retired in 2016. The building is now home to around 30 small businesses and a café which is open to the public.

Until January 2007, Main Street was the A606 but the village now benefits from the Oakham Bypass and the main road has become the B640. New housing estates are being built in the parish as Oakham expands. Facilities in Barleythorpe include the supermarket Aldi, and a BP filling station with a Marks and Spencer Simply Food store attached.
