= Stamford Welland Academy =

Location
- Green Lane; Stamford, Lincolnshire, PE9 1HE; England
- Coordinates: 52.66264°N 0.48099°W

Information
- Type: Academy
- Trust: Cambridge Meridian Academies Trust
- Department for Education URN: 137600 Tables
- Ofsted: Reports
- Headteacher: Victoria Lloyd
- Gender: Coeducational
- Age: 11 to 16
- Houses: Austen, Da Vinci, Newton
- Colours: Black, white, blue, green, red
- Website: http://www.stamfordwellandacademy.org/

Stamford Welland Academy (formerly Stamford Queen Eleanor School) is a coeducational secondary school with academy status, located in Stamford in the English county of Lincolnshire.

== History ==
Stamford Queen Eleanor School was formed in the late 1980s after the dissolution of the town's two comprehensive schools - Fane and Exeter. Previously a community school administered by Lincolnshire County Council, Stamford Queen Eleanor School converted to academy status on 1 November 2011 but continues to coordinate with Lincolnshire County Council for admissions. In 2014 the school became a sponsored academy under the Cambridge Meridian Academies Trust and was renamed Stamford Welland Academy. In 2017 Ofsted rated the school as “good” in all areas.

== Academics ==
Stamford Welland Academy offers GCSEs, BTECs and OCR Nationals as programmes of study for pupils.

== In the news ==
Overnight vandalism at the school on 18 May 2019 wrecked thousands of hours of craft work by model railway enthusiasts before the Market Deeping Model Railway Club's annual show could take place. Four youths were apprehended inside by police and later admitted criminal damage.
