= Netherton United F.C. =

Association football club in England

Netherton United
- Full name: Netherton United Football Club
- Founded: 1992
- Ground: The Grange, Netherton, Cambridgeshire
- Capacity: 1000
- Chairman: Wayne Wright
- Manager: Simon Flanz
- League: Eastern Counties League Division One North
- 2025–26: Peterborough & District League Premier Division, 1st of 15 (promoted)

Netherton United Football Club is a football club based in Netherton, Cambridgeshire, England. They are currently members of the Eastern Counties League Division One North and play at The Grange.

== History ==
The club was established in 1992 as an under-12 team by Thorpe School caretaker Ray Branch, before turning to adult football in 1998 when the team could no longer play youth football. They joined the Peterborough & District League in 1998. They were members of Division Six in 2000–01, but moved up to Division Five when Division Six was disbanded at the end of the season. They were Division Five runners-up in 2001–02, earning promotion to Division Four. A third successive promotion was achieved following a third-place finish in Division Four the following season, and was followed by a fourth promotion when the club finished fourth in Division Three in 2003–04.

When the league was reduced to three first team divisions at the end of the 2004–05 season, Netherton were placed in Division One, a fifth successive promotion. The club were promoted to the Premier Division at the end of the 2009–10 season. In 2012–13 they were Premier Division runners-up, a feat repeated the following season, when they also won the Presidents Premier Shield. In 2014–15 the club won the league's Jack Hogg Charity Shield. They entered the FA Vase for the first time in the 2017–18 season, in which they went on to win the Premier Division title, the President's Shield and the Peterborough Senior Cup.

== Ground ==
The club played at Thorpe Primary School In Peterborough until 1993 when they moved to the Grange. The Grange now has a 3G which is the First Team pitch.

== Honours ==
- Peterborough & District League
  - Premier Division champions 2025–26
  - Division One Runners-up 2025–26 PROMOTED
  - Premier Division champions 2017–18
  - Presidents Premier Shield winners 2013–14, 2017–18
  - Charity Shield winners 2014–15
- Peterborough Senior Cup
  - Winners 2017–18, 2025–26

== Records ==
- Best FA Vase performance: First qualifying round, 2017–18
