= Whittlesey Athletic F.C. =

Association football club in England

Coordinates: 52.561570°N 0.10686323°W

Whittlesey Athletic
- Full name: Whittlesey Athletic Football Club
- Founded: 2014
- Ground: Feldale Field, Whittlesey
- Chairman: Ricky Hailstone
- Manager: Adam Moore
- League: Eastern Counties League Division One North
- 2025–26: Eastern Counties League Division One North, 9th of 20
Home colours

Whittlesey Athletic Football Club is a football club based in Whittlesey, Cambridgeshire, England. They are currently members of the Eastern Counties League Division One North and play at Feldale Field.

== History ==
The club was formed in 2014 as the result of a merger between Whittlesey United and Coates Athletic, both of which were members of the Premier Division of the Peterborough & District League. Coates had been members of the league since 1932 and were Division Three South champions in 1955–56, Division Two champions in 1960–61 and 1982–83, before winning Division Four in 2004–05 and Division One in 2008–09. Whittlesey had first joined the league in 1906 and were Division Two champions in 1925–26, Division One champions in 1952–53, 1965–66 and 1976–77, before becoming Premier Division champions in 2004–05.

Whittlesey Athletic continued in the Premier Division, and were runners-up in 2015–16, earning promotion to Division One of the United Counties League; they also won the Peterborough & District League's charity shield. However, they pulled out of the league midway through the 2016–17 season. The club rejoined the Peterborough & District League the following season and were placed in the Premier Division. The 2018–19 season saw them gain promotion back to the United Counties League after finishing fifth in the Premier Division, as well as winning the Cliff Bullen Challenge Cup.

At the end of the 2020–21 season Whittlesey were transferred to Division One North of the Eastern Counties League.

== Ground ==
The club play their home games at Feldale Field. In 2019, the club installed floodlights at the ground with help of funding from The Football Stadia Improvement Fund.

== Honours ==
- Peterborough & District League
  - Charity Shield winners 2015–16 (joint)
- Cliff Bullen Challenge Cup
  - Winners 2018–19
