= Yaxley F.C. =

Association football club in England

Coordinates: 52°30′37.78″N 0°15′26.79″W

Yaxley
- Full name: Yaxley Football Club
- Nickname: The Cuckoos
- Founded: 1962
- Ground: Leading Drove, Yaxley
- Capacity: 1,000 (150 seated)
- Chairman: Raphael Frascogna
- Manager: Wilkins Makate
- League: United Counties League Premier Division South
- 2025–26: United Counties League Premier Division South, 18th of 20
Home colours	Away colours

Yaxley Football Club is a football club based in Yaxley, Cambridgeshire, England. They are currently members of the United Counties League Premier Division South and play at Leading Drove.

== History ==
A team named Yaxley is recorded playing football from at least March 1894. Yaxley Rovers were formed in 1900, and were founder members of the Peterborough & District League in 1902. The modern club was established in 1962 and joined Division Three South of the Peterborough & District League, before being renamed Yaxley British Legion a year later. In 1964–65 they were promoted to Division Two. Although they were relegated back to Division Three South in at the end of the 1966–67 season, the club returned to Division Two after winning Division Three South in 1968–69. They won the Division Two title in 1970–71, and were promoted to Division One. The following year the club dropped British Legion from their name. After finishing second in Division One for three consecutive seasons, they were promoted to the Premier Division in 1974–75, the same season in which they won the Huntingdonshire Senior Cup for the first time. The club went on to retain the Senior Cup in 1975–76, also finishing as runners-up in the Premier Division.

The 1976–77 season saw Yaxley win the Premier Division for the first time. They won the Huntingdonshire Senior Cup in 1982–83, and completed a treble the following season, winning the Premier Division title, the Peterborough Senior Cup and retaining the Hunts Senior Cup. In 1986 the club were renamed Coalite Yaxley as part of a sponsorship deal. In 1988 they were founder members of Division One of the Eastern Counties League. A change of sponsor in 1990 saw the club renamed Clarksteel Yaxley. In 1992 they were expelled from the Eastern Counties League as their Middleton Road ground did not meet the league's requirements, having no stands and needing temporary dugouts to be put in place on matchdays. The club subsequently dropped into the Huntingdonshire League.

In 1994 the Huntingdonshire League merged with the East Northants League to form the West Anglia League, with Yaxley being its inaugural champions. As West Anglia League champions, and following the move to a new ground, the club were accepted into Division One of the United Counties League for the 1995–96 season. They won the division at the second attempt, and were promoted to the Premier Division. The next few years saw the club win several cups, with the Hunts Senior Cup won in 1998–99, 2003–04, 2004–05 and 2007–08, the Huntingdonshire Premier Cup in 2004–05 and the League Cup in 2005–06 and 2016–17.

In 2017–18 Yaxley won the United Counties League Premier Division, earning promotion to Division One Central of the Southern League. At the end of the 2020–21 season they were transferred to Division One Midlands of the Northern Premier League. During the 2022–23 season they appointed Sammy Mould as manager; at the age of 20, he was the youngest football manager ever appointed in English football. However, he was sacked three months later, and the club finished bottom of Division One Midlands with just six points, resulting in relegation to the Premier Division South of the United Counties League.

== Ground ==
The club played at Middleton Road until 1994. The ground was in a public park and had no stands. In 1994 they relocated to Leading Drove, where a stand and floodlights were installed in the summer of 1995. In 2011 an artificial pitch was installed.

== Honours ==
- United Counties League
  - Premier Division champions 2017–18
  - Division One champions 1996–97
  - League Cup winners 2005–06, 2016–17
- West Anglia League
  - Champions 1994–95
- Peterborough & District League
  - Premier Division champions 1976–77, 1983–84
  - Division Two champions 1970–71
  - Division Three South champions 1968–69
- Hunts Premier Cup
  - Winners 2004–05
- Hunts Senior Cup
  - Winners 1974–75, 1975–76, 1982–83, 1983–84, 1998–99, 2003–04, 2004–05, 2007–08
- Peterborough Senior Cup
  - Winners 1983–84

== Records ==
- Best FA Cup performance: Second qualifying round, 2006–07
- Best FA Trophy performance: First round, 2021–22
- Best FA Vase performance: Fourth round, 2014–15

== See also ==
- Yaxley F.C. players
- Yaxley F.C. managers
