= Somersham Town F.C. =

Association football club in England

Coordinates: 52°22′51.62″N 0°00′25.68″W

Somersham Town
- Full name: Somersham Town Football Club
- Nickname: The Westenders
- Founded: 1893
- Ground: West End Ground, Somersham
- Chairman: Dave Hunt
- Manager: Chad Bailey
- League: Cambridgeshire League Senior Division A
- 2025–26: Cambridgeshire League Senior Division A, 9th of 10
Home colours

Somersham Town Football Club is a football club based in Somersham, near St Ives in Cambridgeshire, England. They club are members of the Cambridgeshire League Senior Division A and play at the West End Ground.

== History ==
The club were established in December 1893 and played in local leagues until World War II, winning the Hunts Junior Cup in 1919–20, 1931–32 and 1935–36. In 1950 the club joined Division One of the Peterborough & District League. They finished second in 1952–53 and were promoted to the Premier Division. In 1969–70 they finished bottom of the table with only three points, but were not relegated. In 1972–73 they won the Hunts Senior Cup and the Peterborough Senior Cup.

They joined the Eastern Counties League in 1988 as founder members of Division One. In 1993–94 they won the Senior Cup again and again in 2000–01. In 2003–04 they finished bottom of Division One, and dropped into the Premier Division of the Cambridgeshire League. In 2007 they were relegated to the Senior A Division after finishing bottom of the Premier Division. They returned to the Premier Division after finishing third in 2009–10.

At the end of the 2011–12 season the club's first team folded, with the reserve team in Division One B becoming the new first team. After finishing second in 2012–13, they were promoted to the Senior Division B. They were runners-up in Senior Division B the following season, resulting in promotion to Senior Division A.

Although the 2020–21 season was abandoned due to the COVID-19 pandemic, Somersham were promoted to the Premier Division. In 2021–22 they finished second-from-bottom of the Premier Division and were relegated back to the Senior Division A.

== Ground ==
In 1960 the club bought some farmland and built the West End Ground, having previously played on a nearby recreation ground. Floodlights were added in 1991, and were officially inaugurated in a friendly game against Norwich City in November 1992, a game which set the ground's attendance record of 538.

== Honours ==
- Hunts Senior Cup
  - Winners 1972–73, 1993–94, 2000–01
- Peterborough Senior Cup
  - Winners 1972–73
- Hinchingbrooke Cup
  - Winners 1953–54
- Hunts Junior Cup
  - Winners 1919–20, 1931–32, 1935–36

== Records ==
- FA Cup best performance: First qualifying round: 1954–55, 1958–59
- FA Vase best performance: First round: 1983–84, 1984–85, 1985–86, 1999–00
- Record attendance (at the West End Ground): 538 vs Norwich City, friendly match, November 1992
