= FC Parson Drove =

Association football club in England

Coordinates: 52.659675°N 0.032442659°E

Parson Drove
- Full name: Football Club Parson Drove
- Nickname: Drove
- Founded: 1921
- Ground: Main Road, Parson Drove
- Chairman: Malcolm Clements
- Manager: Arran Duke
- League: Eastern Counties League Division One North
- 2025–26: Eastern Counties League Division One North, 15th of 20
Home colours	Away colours

Football Club Parson Drove is a football club based in Parson Drove, Cambridgeshire, England. They are currently members of the Eastern Counties League Division One North and play at Main Road.

== History ==
The club was properly established in the village of Parson Drove in 1921 by the headmaster of the local council school. After World War II the club played in the Peterborough & District League and also started entering the FA Cup. After winning Division One in 1948–49, the club were the first champions of its Premier Division in 1949–50. Although they were relegated later in the 1950s, the club won Division One again in 1959–60 and returned to the Premier Division.

Parson Drove saw a sustained period of success in the 1960s and 1970s, winning the Premier Division in 1966–67, 1967–68, 1968–69, 1969–70, 1970–71 and 1973–74. They also won the Cambridgeshire Invitation Cup in 1969–70 and 1972–73, as well as the Cambridgeshire Challenge Cup twice and the Peterborough Senior Cup four times. In the late 1970s and early 1980s the club began entering the FA Cup again and also played in the FA Vase for three seasons. In the 1979–80 FA Cup the club went on a remarkable run that included defeating Southern League clubs Chelmsford City and King's Lynn, with the 2–0 win over Chelmsford labelled City's worst ever performance. In 1988 they made a late application to join the new Division One of the Eastern Counties League, but were rejected. With their ground in a poor state and a lack of interest from the public and players, the club was then disbanded.

On 2 March 1992 the club was resurrected following a meeting by village residents and re-entered the Peterborough & District League in Division Six. They returned to the Premier Division after winning Division One in 2003–04. Midway through the 2013–14 season, the club folded, and had their results expunged from the league. A new Parson Drove club was established in August 2017 when Peterborough & District League Division Two club Wisbech St Mary Saints (who had been formed earlier in the summer) moved to Parson Drove and were renamed to FC Parson Drove. The new club went on to win the Division Two title, earning promotion to Division One, as well as the Cambridgeshire Junior Cup and the North Cambridgeshire Junior Cup.

The 2018–19 season saw Parson Drove win the Division One title, resulting in promotion to the Premier Division. At the end of the 2020–21 season the club were promoted to Division One North of the Eastern Counties League. The reformed club entered the FA Vase for the first time in 2021–22.

== Ground ==
Prior to World War I the club played on the Butchers Arms Field and at Woadmill Grassfield. Due to a lack of a suitable venue, after the war the club moved to nearby Murrow for two seasons. They returned to Parson Drove to play at some land at Clough's Cross Farm before moving to a field in Fen Road, known as Down the Fen in 1930. In 1975 a new playing field was opened on Main Road, and the club moved to the ground.

== Honours ==
- Peterborough & District League
  - Premier Division champions 1949–50, 1966–67, 1967–68, 1968–69, 1969–70, 1970–71, 1972–73
  - Division One champions 1948–49, 1958–59, 2003–04, 2018–19
  - Division Two champions 2017–18
- Cambridgeshire Invitation Cup
  - Winners 1969–70, 1972–73
- Cambridgeshire Junior Cup
  - Winners 2017–18
- North Cambridgeshire Junior Cup
  - Winners 2017–18

== Records ==
- Best FA Cup performance: Fourth qualifying round, 1979–80
- Best FA Vase performance: Third round, 1976–77

== See also ==
- FC Parson Drove players
