= Huntingdon United F.C. =

Association football club in England

Huntingdon United
- Full name: Huntingdon United Football Club
- Founded: 2005
- Ground: Jubilee Park
- Manager: Luke Claxton
- League: Cambridgeshire League Senior Division A
- 2025–26: Cambridgeshire League Senior Division B, 2nd of 14 (promoted)
Home colours

Huntingdon United Football Club is a football club based in Huntingdon, Cambridgeshire, England. They are currently members of the Cambridgeshire League Senior Division A and play at Jubilee Park.

== History ==
The original Huntingdon United were established in 1948 as a merger of Huntingdon Town and Huntingdon Wanderers. Town had been formed in the 1800s and won the Huntingdonshire Senior Cup eleven times before World War I. For most of the period between 1922 and the merger, they had played in the Peterborough & District League. The newly merged club joined the Central Amateur League in 1949, but the league folded at the end of the season. The club then joined Division Two of the United Counties League instead. In 1960 they dropped into Division One of the Peterborough & District League in 1960. They won the division in 1962–63 and were promoted to the Premier Division, where they won the title in 1974–75 and 1975–76.

In 1988 Huntingdon joined the newly formed Division One of the Eastern Counties League and finished ninth in their first season. After finishing fourteenth in 1989–90 and sixteenth in 1990–91, the club finished second from bottom in 1991–92. With no secretary and only two club officials left, the club resigned from the league at the end of the season. The first team replaced their reserves in the Huntingdonshire League. They joined the newly established West Anglian League in 1994, and were runners-up in its first season. The following year they won the league and cup double, and were promoted to Division One of the United Counties League. They finished fifth in their first season, by now playing at the Sapley Road playing fields after leaving their Tower Field ground. However, after a planned move to a new ground in Kings Ripton Road fell through (the ground eventually became home to Huntingdon Town), the manager and most of the players left. The following season they finished bottom of Division One, conceding 273 goals in 34 matches.

Huntingdon dropped into the East Midlands Alliance, before switching to Senior Division A of the Cambridgeshire League. In 2004 they dropped down again, taking the place of their reserves in Division 2B. In 2005 they merged with RGE Huntingdon to form Huntingdon United RGE. The new club was promoted to Division 1B in 2005–06. They won the division the following season and were promoted to the Senior Division B. Although the first team withdrew from the league during the 2007–08 season, the reserves continued, effectively becoming the first team. They were promoted to Division 2B as champions of Division 3B in 2008–09, and were promoted again to Division 1B the following season after finishing second. The club dropped the RGE from their name during the 2013–14 season.

In 2016–17 Huntingdon won the Creake Charity Shield, beating Chatteris Town reserves 5–0 in the final, and were champions of Division 1B, remaining unbeaten during the league season, earning promotion to Senior Division B. The following season saw them win the Percy Oldham Memorial Cup and the Senior Division B title, securing a second successive promotion.

== Honours ==
- Cambridgeshire League
  - Senior B Champions 2017–18
  - Division 1A champions 2006–07
  - Division 1B champions 2016–17
  - Division 3B champions 2008–09
  - Percy Oldham Memorial Cup winners 2017–18
  - Creake Charity Shield winners 2016–17
- Peterborough League
  - Premier Division champions 1974–75, 1975–76
  - Division One champions 1962–63
- West Anglia League
  - Champions 1995–96
  - League Cup winners 1995–96

== Records ==
- Best FA Cup performance: First qualifying round, 1949–50, 1950–51, 1951–52, 1952–53, 1954–55
- Best FA Vase performance: First round, 1977–78
