= Warboys Town F.C. =

Association football club in England

Coordinates: 52°24′05.54″N 0°04′40.78″W

Warboys Town
- Full name: Warboys Town Football Club
- Nickname: The Witches
- Founded: 1885
- Ground: Forge Way, Warboys
- Manager: Simon Flanz
- League: Peterborough & District League Premier Division
- 2024–25: Peterborough & District League Premier Division, 3rd of 17

Warboys Town Football Club is a football club based in Warboys, near Ramsey in Cambridgeshire, England. The club are currently members of the Peterborough & District League Premier Division and play at Forge Way.

== History ==
The club were established in 1885 and initially played in local leagues before joining the Huntingdonshire League. In 1926 they moved up to the Peterborough & District League. In 1926–27 they won the Huntingdonshire Senior Cup, a feat repeated in 1928–29, 1931–32 and 1932–33. In 1946–47 the club finished bottom of the league and dropped back into the Huntingdonshire League. In 1950 they joined Division Two of the United Counties Football League, before returning to the Peterborough & District League in 1956.

The club entered the FA Cup for four seasons in the late 1950s, but on each occasion failed to win a match. In 1988 the club were founder members of Division One of the Eastern Counties League. They finished bottom in 1989–90 and 1990–91, but improved to finish third in both 1993–94 and 1994–95. The following season they finished second after winning nine matches in a row at the end of the season, and were promoted to the Premier Division. They were relegated back to Division One at the end of the 2000–01 season. In 2002–03 they finished bottom of the division, and suffering from player and official shortages, they withdrew from the league in November the following season. The first team took over the fixtures of the reserves in Division 2B of the Cambridgeshire League. The following season they entered a team in Senior Division A, but finished bottom of the table on −4 points due to a six-point deduction. In 2005 they transferred back to the Peterborough & District League, joining Division Two. After finishing third in 2007–08 they were promoted to Division One but have since been relegated back to Division Two and then promoted back to Division One.

== Ground ==
The club have played at the Sports Field on Forge Way for their entire history. The players initially changed in a nearby pub, but after World War II a war department hut taken from a local airfield was obtained for use as changing rooms. The ground is shared with the local cricket club. The record attendance is 500 for a Hunts Senior Cup match against Ramsey Town.

== Honours ==
- Huntingdonshire Senior Cup
  - Winners 1926–27, 1928–29, 1931–32, 1932–33
- Peterborough Senior Cup
  - Winners 1963–64

== Records ==
- Highest league position: 15th, Eastern Counties League Premier Division, 1996–97, 1998–99, 1999–2000
- Best FA Cup performance: Second qualifying round, 1999–2000
- Best FA Vase performance: Second round, 1994–95
- Attendance: 500 vs Ramsey Town, Hunts Senior Cup semi-final
