= Wisbech Town F.C. =

Association football club in England

Coordinates: 52.6776°N 0.1810°E

Wisbech Town
- Full name: Wisbech Town Football Club
- Nickname: The Fenmen
- Founded: 1920
- Ground: Fenland Stadium, Wisbech
- Capacity: 1,118
- Chairman: Paul Brenchley
- Manager: Luke Hipwell
- League: Eastern Counties League Premier Division
- 2025–26: United Counties League Premier Division North, 15th of 20 (transferred)
Home colours	Away colours

Wisbech Town Football Club is a football club based near Wisbech, Cambridgeshire, England. The club are currently members of the Eastern Counties League Premier Division and play at the Fenland Stadium.

== History ==
Although a Wisbech Town existed in the 1890s, the current club was established in 1920 by the merger of three local clubs. They initially played in the Peterborough & District League, winning it in 1924–25, 1927–28, 1928–29, 1931–32 and 1932–33. In 1935 the club turned semi-professional and joined the United Counties League. Former West Ham player Sam Jennings was the first major signing, and the club won the United Counties League Cup in their first season.

In 1945–46 the club reached the first round of the FA Cup, but lost to Ipswich Town. The following season they won the league title, a feat repeated the following season. In 1950 they switched to the Eastern Counties League, before joining the Midland League in 1952.

In 1957–58 the club reached the second round of the FA Cup, beating Colchester United 1–0 in the first leg, before losing 2–1 at Reading. That season they finished second in the league, and switched again to the Southern League, joining the North-West Division. After finishing ninth and reaching the first round of the FA Cup again (losing 4–1 in a replay at Newport County), the club was placed in the new Premier Division as the league reorganised. They reached the first round again in 1959–60, but lost 4–1 to Wycombe Wanderers. They were relegated in 1960–61, but returned as Division One champions in 1961–62. Despite reaching the first round of the FA Cup again, they were relegated back to Division One in 1964–65. In 1965–66 they reached the first round of the FA Cup for the last time until 1995, losing 10–1 at Brighton & Hove Albion, their record defeat.

In 1970 the club returned to the Eastern Counties League. They won the League Cup in 1971, the league and cup double in 1971–72, and the league again in 1976–77. In 1983–84 the club went 37 league matches unbeaten, but lost the title on goal difference. The following season they reached the semi-finals of the FA Vase, but lost to Halesowen Town in a semi-final replay after a draw over the original two legs. They reached the same stage the next season, but lost to Southall. They won the East Anglian Cup in 1988, and in 1990–91 they won the league again, and in 1995 the League Cup.

In 1995–96 the club reached the first round of the FA Cup for the first time since the 1960s, but lost 5–1 at Kingstonian. However, after finishing second in the league that season the club were promoted to the Midland Division of the Southern League. Whilst playing in the Southern League, the club's reserve team entered the Eastern Counties League. The club reached the first round of the FA Cup again in 1996–97, losing 2–1 at home to St Albans City. The following season they reached the second round, after beating Billericay Town 2–1, before losing 2–0 at home to Bristol Rovers.

In the autumn of 2000, Wisbech experienced financial difficulties, leading to the release of six players. The club were relegated back to the Eastern Counties League in 2001–02 after finishing bottom of their division, and the reserve team dropped into the Cambridgeshire League.

Having finished the 2012–13 season in second place in the Eastern Counties League Premier Division, the club were eligible for promotion. However, this opportunity was declined in favour of a voluntary lateral movement, rejoining the United Counties League Premier Division instead. They were runners-up in 2017–18, earning promotion to Division One East of the Northern Premier League. After finishing bottom of the Northern Premier League Midland Division at the end of the 2021–22 season, the club were relegated to the Premier Division North of the United Counties League.

== Stadium ==
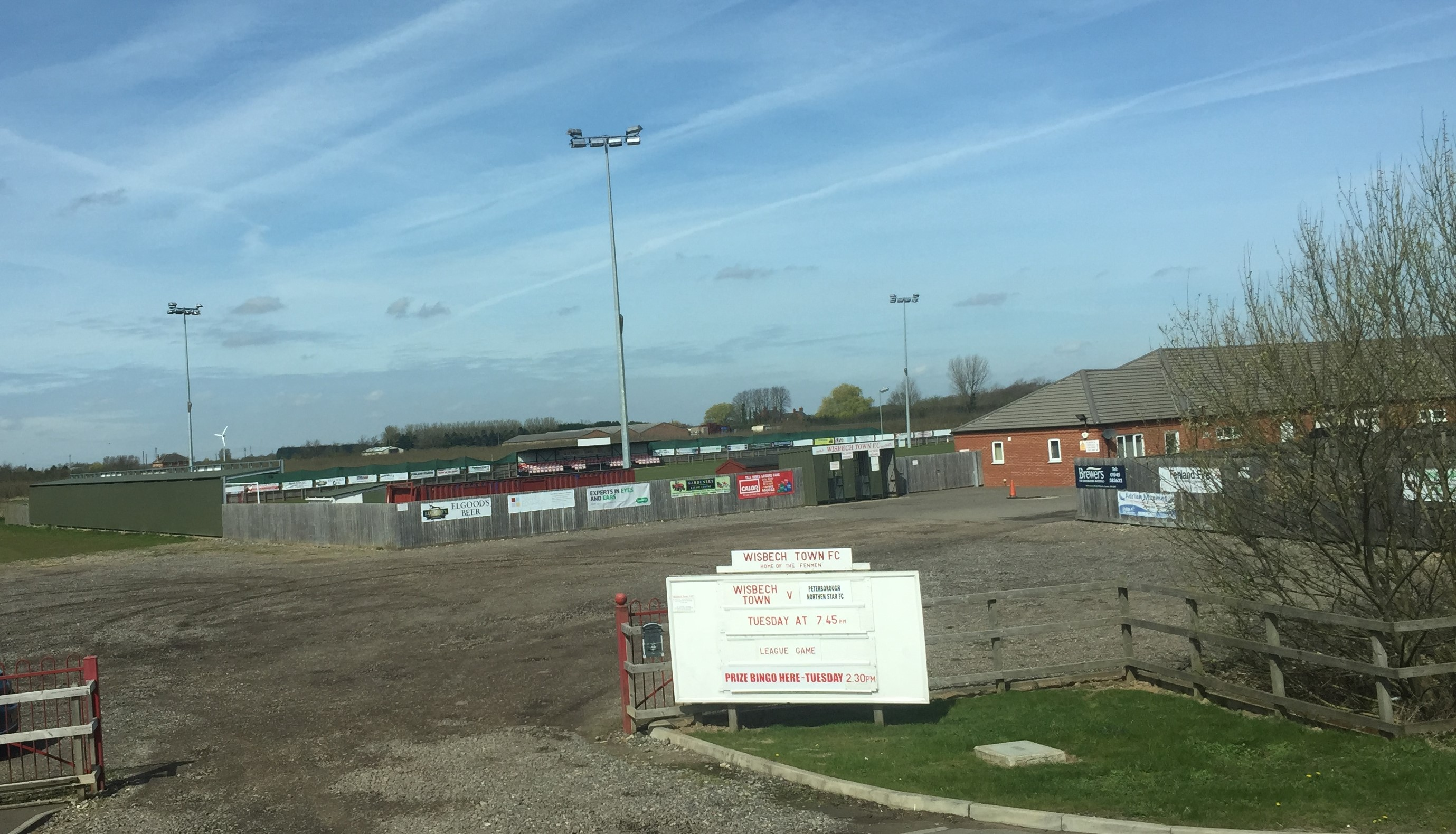
The new stadium.

The original Wisbech Town played at Flint House from 1892 until folding in 1896. After its formation in 1920, the current club initially played at Wisbech Park before moving to Rectory Field the following season. At the start of the 1922–23 season the club began renting a field in Harecroft Road from a local landowner named Mr Overland, and permission was also obtained for the construction of a grandstand along one side of the pitch to boost attendances. When football resumed after World War II, the club's form and ambitions had outgrown Harecroft Road so, in September 1946, a former orchard in Lerowe Road, Walsoken, was acquired for £2000 and work commenced on a new ground to be ready by the start of the next season. Fenland Park opened in August 1947, with the grandstand and changing facilities from Harecroft Road being transported to the new stadium at a cost of over £600. At the start of the 1957–58 season, Fenland Park's record attendance of 8,044 was set on 25 August 1957 for a match against local rivals Peterborough United.

In the 2000s the club began to make plans for a new stadium. In March 2008 planning permission was granted by King's Lynn and West Norfolk Borough Council to build a new ground on a 9-acre (36,000 m^{2}) site on the eastern outskirts of the town.

In September 2008 the club left Fenland Park and started playing at Outwell Swift's Nest ground after installing a seated stand, floodlights and terracing. Construction began on the new ground in January 2010, with the first match, a 5–0 win over St Andrews in the FA Cup extra-preliminary round, taking place on 14 August 2010. Fenland Park was subsequently used for housing, with an estate named Fenmen Place built on the site.

On 9 February 2020, the North Stand was destroyed by Storm Ciara.

== Honours ==
- Southern League
  - Division One champions 1961–62
- Eastern Counties League
  - Champions 1971–72, 1976–77, 1990–91
  - League Cup winners 2010–11, 2012–13
- United Counties League
  - Champions 1946–47, 1947–48, 1949–50

== Records ==
- Best FA Cup performance: Second round, 1957–58, 1997–98
- Best FA Trophy performance: Second round, 1999–2000
- Best FA Vase performance: Semi-finals, 1984–85, 1985–86
- Attendance: 8,044 vs Peterborough United, Midland League, 25 August 1957
- Goalscorer: Bert Titmarsh, 246 (1931–37)
- Appearances: Jamie Brighty, 731

== See also ==
- Wisbech Town F.C. players
- Wisbech Town F.C. managers
