= Long Sutton Athletic F.C. =

Association football club in England

Long Sutton Athletic
- Full name: Long Sutton Athletic Football Club
- Nickname: The Magpies
- Founded: 1983
- Ground: The Park, Long Sutton
- Chairman: Steve Cousins
- Manager: Mark Greenacre
- League: Peterborough & District League Premier Division
- 2025–26: Peterborough & District League Division One, 1st of 15 (promoted)

Long Sutton Athletic F.C. is an English football club from Long Sutton, Lincolnshire. They are currently members of the Peterborough & District League Premier Division and play at the Park.

== History ==
The club was established in 1983, although Long Sutton Town had played in the Peterborough & District League between 1932 and 1953. The new club joined Division Six of the Peterborough & District League in 1984, and won the division at the first attempt. The following season they won Division Five, going undefeated in the league. In 1986–87 they won Division Four and applied to join the United Counties League, but withdrew their application after it became obvious that a new stand could not be built in time. However, the following season they won Division Three and were then accepted into Division One of the Eastern Counties League as the league added a second division. Despite the huge step up, they finished seventh in their first season. However, by the mid-1990s the club was struggling with the costs of playing in the ECL and resigned in order to return to the Peterborough & District League. They replaced their reserve team in Division Five for the 1995–96 season, winning all 20 matches. They went on to win Division Four, Division Three and Division Two titles in successive seasons, earning promotion straight to the Premier Division in 1999.

In 2005–06 Long Sutton finished bottom of the Premier Division, but avoided relegation as one promoted club withdrew from the league and the other chose not to take promotion. However, they finished bottom again the following season and were relegated to Division One. In 2014–15 the club finished bottom of Division One, but avoided being relegated. In 2017–18 they finished third in Division One and were promoted back to the Premier Division. In 2021–22 the club finished bottom of the Premier Division and were relegated to Division One. They were Division One champions in 2025–26 and were promoted back to the Premier Division.

== Honours ==
- Peterborough & District League
  - Division One champions 2025–26
  - Division Two champions 1998–99
  - Division Three champions 1987–88, 1997–98
  - Division Four champions 1986–87, 1996–97
  - Division Five champions 1985–86, 1995–96
  - Division Six champions 1984–85
- Lincolnshire Junior Cup
  - Winners 1985–86
- Lincolnshire Senior 'B' Cup
  - Winners 1989–90
- Peterborough Minor Cup
  - Winners 1984–85
- Peterborough Challenge Cup
  - Winners 1996–97, 1997–98
- Peterborough Junior Cup
  - Winners 1998–99

== Records ==
- Best FA Vase performance: Second qualifying round, 1995–96

== See also ==
- Long Sutton Athletic F.C. players
- Long Sutton Athletic F.C. managers
