= Oakham United F.C. (Rutland) =

Association football club in England

- Full name: Oakham United Football Club
- Nickname: Oakham United
- Founded: 2011
- Ground: Main Road, Barleythorpe, Rutland LE15 7EE
- Capacity: 1,000
- Chairman: Craig Shuttleworth
- Manager: Luke Field
- League: Peterborough & District League Premier Division
- 2025–26: Peterborough & District League Premier Division, 10th of 15
Home colours	Away colours

Oakham United is a football club based in Barleythorpe, Oakham, Rutland, England. The club competes in the Peterborough & District League Premier Division. The club is a FA England Accredited Football Club affiliated to the Leicestershire and Rutland County Football Association.

== History ==
The club was formed in 2011 as the result of a merger between Rutland Rangers and Oakham Imperial and played in the Peterborough Premier League. The 2014–15 season saw the club win the Peterborough and District Football League Premier Division title and the Presidents Premier Shield, which earned them promotion to the United Counties League Division One.

In their first season playing UCL football, Oakham finished in 12th place having earned 47 points as well as being runners up in the Leicestershire and Rutland Senior Cup, losing to Hinckley A.F.C. in the final. The club also competed in the FA Vase for the first time getting knocked out in the first qualifying round by Shirebrook Town.

The 2016–17 saw Oakham improve upon the previous season. They finished in 11th Place in the UCL Division 1 amassing 51 points and finishing in 11th place. Oakham also progressed to the 1st round of the F.A. Vase beating Gedling Miners Welfare and Retford United in the preliminary stages before being knocked out by Rocester of the Midland Football League

The 2017–18 season saw the club finish 19th in the league and so were relegated back to the Peterborough and District Football League Premier Division.

In the 2023-24 the club won the Peterborough Senior Cup beating Warboys Town on Penalties at the Weston Homes Stadium.

The Club finished 11th in 2024/25 in the Peterborough District Senior Premier Division.

In the 2025/26 season the club finished 10th in the PDFL under the stewardship of Neil Duncan. The club reached the Final of the Peterborough Senior Cup played at Stamford's Zeeco Stadium.

== Ground ==
The club play their home games at Main Road, Barleythorpe, near Oakham, Rutland. The ground has been called Lands' End, Lonsdale Meadow and Sterling Meadows.

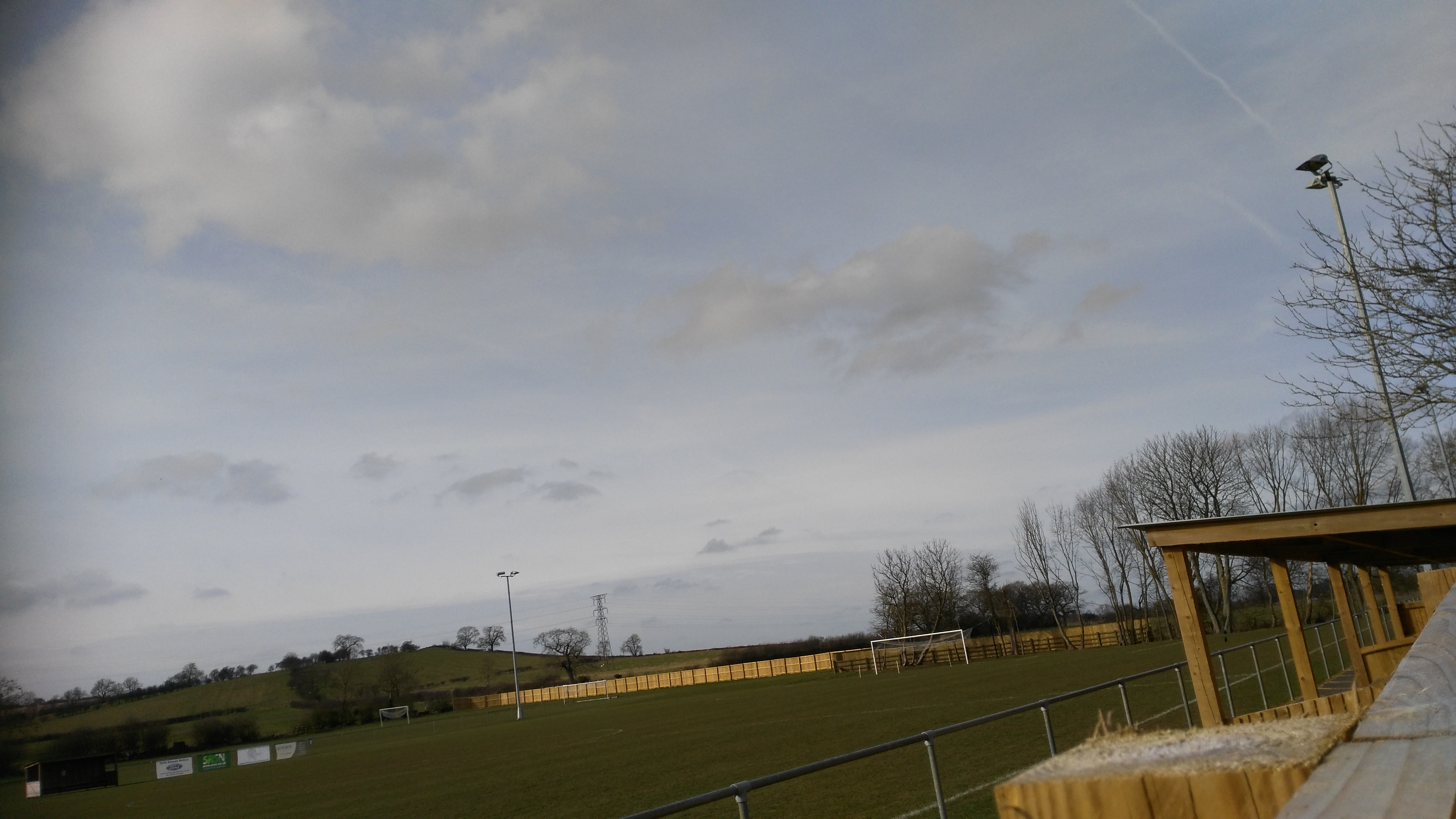
Oakham United's main stand and far end

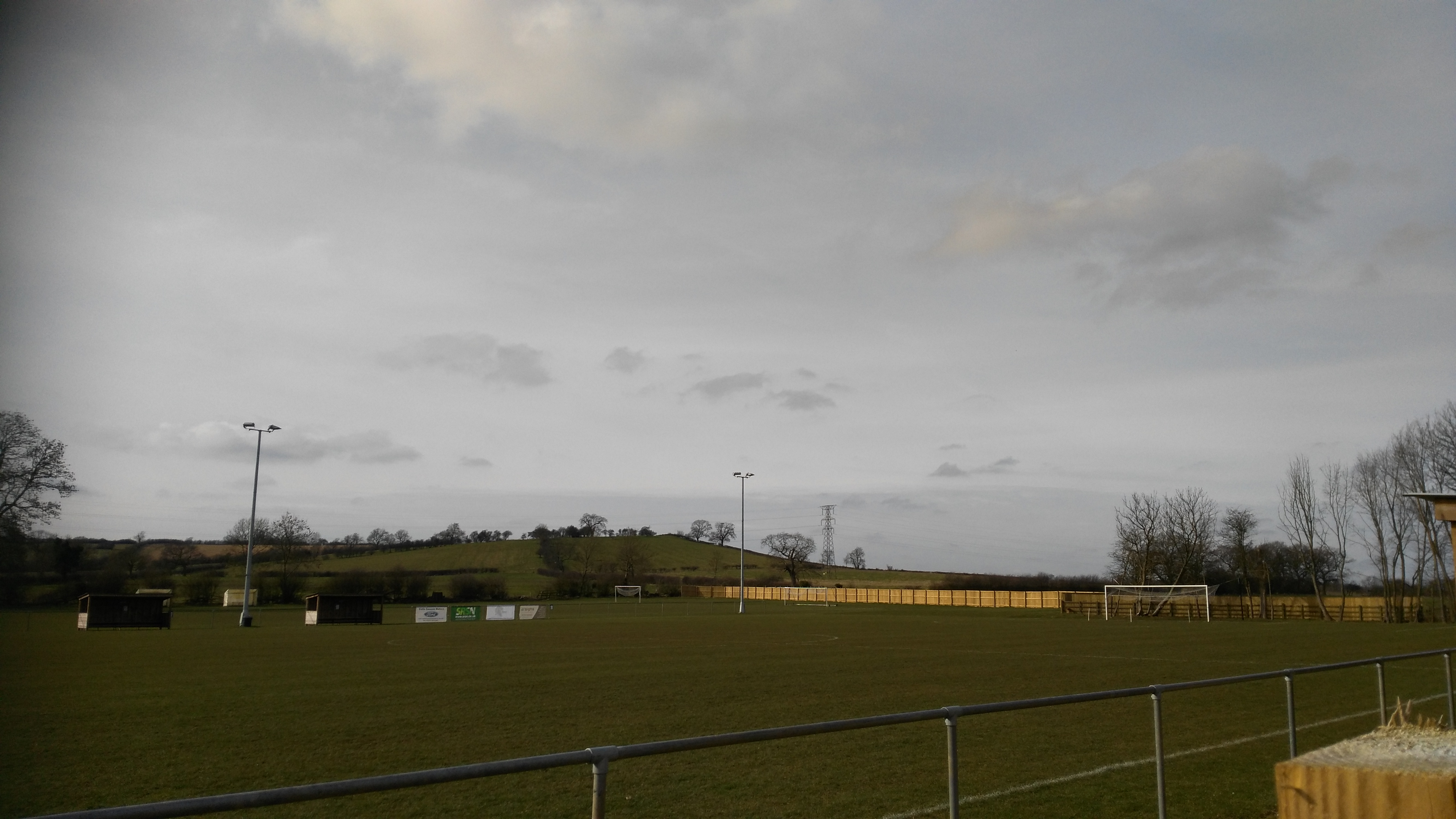
The pitch and disused far side

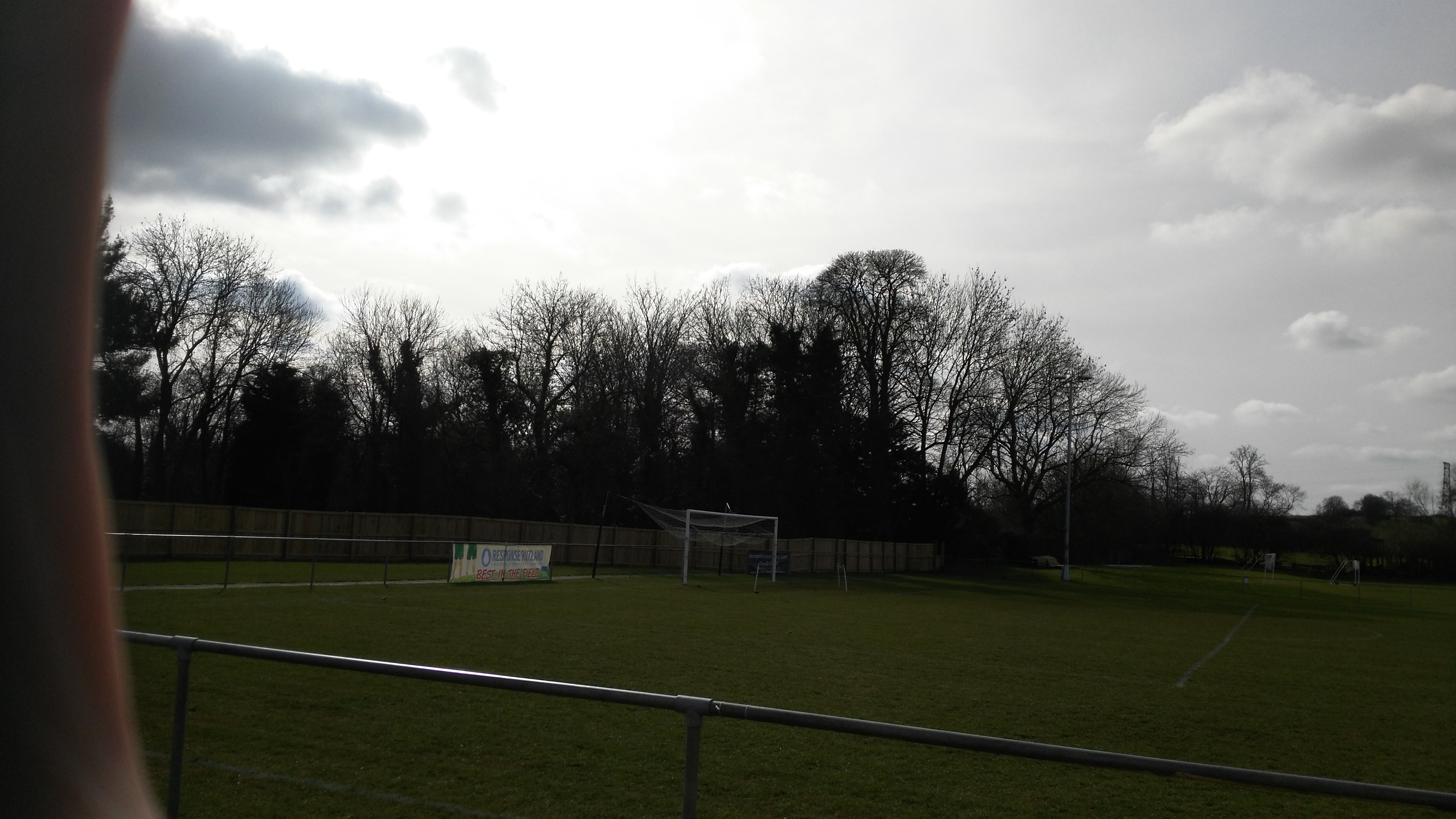
College end

== Honours ==
- Peterborough and District Football League
  - Premier League Champions: 2014–15
  - ChromaSport & Trophies President Premier Shield: 2014–15
  - Peterborough Senior Cup: 2023–24
