= Peterborough and District Football League =

Association football league in England

- Country: England
- Divisions: 13
- Number of clubs: 138
- Level on pyramid: Level 11 (Premier Division)
- Feeder to: Eastern Counties League Division One North; United Counties League Division One
- Current champions: Uppingham Town (Premier Division); Stamford Belvedere (Division One); Netherton United Reserves (Division Two); Wittering (Division Three); Thorpe Wood Rangers (Division Four) (2024–25)
- Website: Official site

The Peterborough & District Football League is a football competition in England. It has a total of six divisions, the highest of which, the Premier Division, sits at step 7 of the National League System (level 11 of the English football league system). It is a feeder to the United Counties League Division One.

For the 2023–24 season there are 138 teams competing in the league, which, under the terms of a sponsorship agreement, is known as the GCE HIRE FLEET Peterborough & District Football League.

In 2005–06 the PDFL introduced 'combination leagues' for Reserve and 'A' teams. These divisions were scrapped after the 2010-11 season and the league went back to six ordinary divisions named Premier Division, Division One, Division Two, Division Three, Division Four and Division Five. The league also introduced a Veterans Section in 2012 and a Walking football division in 2020.

== 2026–27 Members ==
=== Premier Division ===
Club	Home ground
Crowland Town	Snowden Playing Fields, Crowland
Deeping Rangers Reserves	Deeping Sports & Social Club, Market Deeping
Eye Rangers	Lindisfarne Road Recreation Ground, Eye
FC Peterborough Reserves	King Carz Arena, Peterborough
Leverington Sports	Leverington Sports & Social Club, Leverington
Long Sutton Athletic	London Road Playing Fields, Long Sutton
Moulton Harrox	Harrox Playing Fields, Moulton
Oakham United	Main Road, Barleythorpe
Ramsey Town	Cricketfield Lane, Ramsey
Sawtry	Sawtry Village Academy, Sawtry
Stamford AFC Reserves	Borderville Sports Centre, Stamford
Uppingham Town	Tod's Piece, Uppingham
Warboys Town	Warboys Sports Field, Warboys
Whaplode Drove Rovers	Elizabethan Centre, Whaplode Drove
Whittlesey Athletic Reserves	Danzen Logistics Stadium, Whittlesey
YDP	St. John Fisher Catholic High School, Peterborough

=== Division One ===
Club	Home ground
Bourne Town Reserves	Elsea Park AGP, Bourne
Crowland Town Reserves	Snowden Field, Crowland
FC Parson Drove Reserves	Main Road, Parson Drove
Glinton & Northborough	Arthur Mellows Village College, Glinton
ICA Sports	South Bretton Playing Field, Bretton
Ketton Sports Premiair	Easton on the Hill Playing Fields, Easton on the Hill
King's Cliffe	KC Active, King's Cliffe
Netherton United Reserves	The Grange, Peterborough
Oundle Town	East Road, Oundle
Park Farm Pumas	Cardea Playing Fields, Peterborough
Stamford Belvedere	Stamford Welland Academy, Stamford
Thorpe Wood Rangers	Woodlands Sports Complex, Castor
Wittering	Wittering Playing Field, Wittering
Yaxley Reserves	Leading Drove, Yaxley

=== Division Two ===
Club	Home ground
Hampton United	Bushfield Leisure Centre, Peterborough
Ketton Sports Reserves	Ketton Drift, Easton on the Hill
Langtoft United	Elsea Park AGP, Bourne
Long Sutton Athletic Reserves	London Road Playing Fields, Long Sutton
NXT GEN	Werrington Leisure Centre, Peterborough
Oakham United Reserves	Main Road, Barleythorpe
Park Farm Pumas Reserves	Lawson Avenue Playing Fields, Peterborough
Ramsey Town Reserves	Ramsey Cricket Club, Ramsey
Sawtry Reserves	Queens Park, Yaxley
Stanground Cardea Sports	Stanground Sports Centre, Peterborough
Sutton Bridge United	Sutton Bridge Memorial Park, Sutton Bridge
Thorney	Thorney Park, Thorney
Tydd	Glebe Field, Tydd St. Mary
Uppingham Town Reserves	Tod's Piece, Uppingham
Whittlesey Athletic Development	Danzen Logistics Stadium, Whittlesey

=== Division Three ===
Club	Home ground
Dudu Footy	Werrington Leisure Centre, Peterborough
FC Peterborough Development	Fulbridge Recreation Ground, Peterborough
Glinton & Northborough Reserves	Arthur Mellows Village College, Glinton
Ketton Sports Development	Ketton Sports & Community Centre, Ketton
Moulton Harrox Reserves	
Peterborough Lions	Peterborough Lions Rugby Club, Bretton
Stamford Belvedere Reserves	Stamford Welland Academy, Stamford
Stamford Lions	Bushfield Leisure Centre, Peterborough
Stanton	Middletons Recreation Ground, Yaxley
Thorpe Wood Rangers Reserves	Woodlands Sports Complex, Castor
Thurlby Tigers	Elsea Park AGP, Bourne
Wittering Reserves	Wittering Playing Field, Wittering

=== Division Four ===
Club	Home ground
Deeping United	Brudenell Playing Field, Baston
Eunice	Sapley Park, Huntingdon
Farcet United	High Street, Stilton
ICA Sports Reserves	South Bretton Pavillion, Peterborough
Langtoft United Reserves	Manor Close, Langtoft
Leverington Sports Reserves	Leverington Sports and Social Club, Leverington
Moulton Chapel	Cekhira Avenue, Moulton Chapel
Netherton United U23	The Grange, Peterborough
Peterborough Lions Reserves	Rugby Club, Bretton, Peterborough
Stamford Lions Reserves	Empingham Road Playing Field, Stamford
Stanton Reserves	Middletons Road, Yaxley
Thorpe Wood Rangers 'A'	Woodlands, Castor

=== Veterans Premier Division ===
Club	Home ground
Deeping Rangers Veterans	Deeping Sports & Social Club, Market Deeping
Hampton Rangers Veterans	Hampton Gardens School, Hampton
Ketton Sports Premiair	Borderville Sports Centre, Stamford
Long Sutton Athletic Veterans	London Road Playing Field, Long Sutton
Oakham United Veterans	Main Road, Barleythorpe
Stilton United Veterans	Stilton Village Playing Fields, Stilton
Whittlesey Athletic Veterans	Danzen Logistics Stadium, Whittlesey
Yaxley Veterans	Leading Drove, Yaxley

=== Veterans Central Division ===
Club	Home ground
Dor-Jan Veterans	St John Fisher Catholic High School, Peterborough
Glinton & Northborough Veterans	Borderville Sports Centre, Stamford
Ketton Sports Veterans Reserves	Borderville Sports Centre, Stamford
Kings Cliffe Veterans	Eslaforde Park, Sleaford
Netherton United Veterans	The Grange, Peterborough
Orton Rangers Veterans	
Park Farm Pumas Veterans	St John Fisher Catholic High School, Peterborough
Royal Eagles Veterans	St John Fisher Catholic High School, Peterborough
Thorney Veterans	Thorney Park, Thorney

=== Veterans East Division ===
Club	Home ground
Borderville Veterans	Borderville Sports Centre, Stamford
Ketton Sports Veterans	Ketton Sports & Community Centre, Ketton
Kings Cliffe Exiles Veterans	Leading Drove, Yaxley
One Touch Football Veterans	Westray Park, Cottesmore
Park Farm Pumas Veterans Reserves	St John Fisher Catholic High School, Peterborough
Stamford Belvedere Veterans	Blackstone Sports and Social Club, Stamford
Stamford Lions Veterans	Empingham Road Playing Field, Stamford
Uppingham Town Veterans	Tod's Piece, Uppingham

=== Veterans North Division ===
Club	Home ground
Deeping United Veterans	Holbeach United Community Sports Academy, Holbeach
FC Parson Drove Veterans	Parson Drove Sports Pavilion, Parson Drove
Lincs Senior Veterans	Elsea Park AGP, Bourne
Moulton Chapel Veterans	
South Lincolnshire Swifts Veterans	Monks House Playing Field, Spalding
Spalding United Veterans	Sir Halley Stewart Playing Field, Spalding
Wyberton Veterans	Wyberton Playing Field, Wyberton

=== Veterans South Division ===
Club	Home ground
Brampton Kings Veterans	Brampton Memorial Playing Field, Brampton
Buckden Veterans	Buckden Recreation Ground, Buckden
Eunice Huntingdon Veterans	Hinchingbrooke School, Huntingdon
Fenstanton Veterans	Hall Green Lane, Fenstanton
Huntingdon Town Veterans	Jubilee Park, Sapley
March Academy Veterans	Estover Playing Field, March
Yaxley Veterans Reserves	Leading Drove, Yaxley

== Past winners ==
=== Champions ===
Season	Champions						
1902–03	Fletton United						
1903–04	Fletton United						
1904–05	Fletton United						
1905–06	Peterborough Town Reserves						
1906–07	G.E. Loco						
1907–08	G.E. Loco						
1908–09	Westwood Works						
Season	Division 1	Division 2					
1909–10	G.N. Loco Reserves	Crowland Abbey					
1910–11	Westwood Works	Yaxley Rovers					
1911–12	Westwood Works	Stamford Vics					
1912–13	Westwood Works	Brainsbys Works					
1913–14	Westwood Works	Westwood Works Reserves					
Season	Champions						
1914–15	Belvedere						
1918–19	Blackstones						
1919–20	Stamford Reserves						
Season	Division 1	Division 2					
1920–21	Westwood Works	Peterborough Rovers					
Season	Division 1	Division 2	Division 3				
1921–22	G.N. Loco	G.N. Sheet Stores	Yaxley Rovers Reserves				
1922–23	G.N. Loco	G.N. Sheet Stores	Barfords				
1923–24	G.N. Loco	Barfords	Newark				
1924–25	Wisbech Town	Silver Badge	Paston Athletic Reserves				
1925–26	G.N. Loco	Whittlesey Town	Brotherhoods				
1926–27	Westwood Works	Barfords	Williamson Cliff				
1927–28	Wisbech Town	New Peterborough Sports	Longthorpe Scouts				
1928–29	Wisbech Town	Crowland Rovers	Castor & Ailsworth				
1929–30	Barfords	London Brick Company	Whittlesey Town				
1930–31	Spalding United	Paston Athletic	L.N.E.R. Accounts				
Season	Division 1	Division 2	Division 3 (Southern Section)	Division 3 (Northern Section)			
1931–32	Wisbech Town	L.N.E.R. Athletic	Celta Mills	Municipal Sports			
1932–33	Wisbech Town	Crowland Abbey	Central Sugar Company	Deeping United			
1933–34	Bourne Town	Stamford St. George	Orton Waterville	Kings Dyke			
1934–35	Phorpres Sports	Phorpres Sports Reserves	Castor & Ailsworth	Northam Star Sports			
1935–36	Peterborough United Reserves	Crowland Abbey	L.N.E.R. Sheet Stores	Maxey United			
1936–37	Chatteris Engineers	Moulton Chapel	Electricity Sports	R.A.F. (Peterborough)			
1937–38	St. Ives Town	R.A.F. (Wittering)	Stanground Victoria	Crowland Abbey			
1938–39	Westwood Works	R.A.F. (Peterborough)	Phorpres Sports Reserves	Deeping United			
Season	Division 1	Division 2					
1945–46	Bourne Town	Brotherhoods Reserves					
Season	Division 1	Division 2	Division 3 (Southern Section)	Division 3 (Northern Section)			
1946–47	Bourne Town	Crowland Town	College	Crowland Town Reserves			
1947–48	March Town	Phorpres Sports	Holme Rovers	Helpston United			
1948–49	Parson Drove	Morton	Ramsey Town	L.N.E.R. Athletic			
Season	Premier Division	Division One	Division Two	Division 3 (Southern Section)	Division 3 (Northern Section)		
1949–50	Parsons Drove	South Lynn Youth Club	Perkins Athletic Reserves	Warmington Wasps	Maxey United		
1950–51	King's Lynn Reserves	Upwell Town	Yaxley Athletic	King's Lynn 'A'	Helpston United		
1951–52	Cambridge United Reserves	Bourne Town Reserves	King's Lynn 'A'	Kings Dyke	East Ward		
1952–53	Cambridge United Reserves	Whittlesey United	Helpston United	March British Legion	Nassington		
1953–54	King's Lynn Reserves	Warmington Wasps	Parson Drove	Manea United	Dogsthorpe		
1954–55	Cambridge United Reserves	Morton	Manea United	Oundle Town	Warmington Wasps		
1955–56	Ely City	Morton	Warmington Wasps	Coates Athletic	Barnack United		
1956–57	King's Lynn Reserves	Morton	Thurlby United	March St. Mary's	Northam Star Sports		
1957–58	Newmarket Town	declared null and void	Perkins Athletic	Peterborough United 'B'	Glinton United		
1958–59	Cambridge United Reserves	Parson Drove	March St. Mary's	New England United	British Railways		
1959–60	Soham Town Rangers	Ramsey Town	Crowland Town	Peterborough Rovers	Stamford Reserves		
1960–61	Cambridge United Reserves	Phorpres Sports	Coates Athletic	Whittlesey United	Eye United		
1961–62	Soham Town Rangers	Perkins Athletic	Blackstones Works	Downham Town Reserves	Stamford Belvedere		
1962–63	Downham Town	Huntingdon United	Chatteris Engineers	Leverington Sports	B.R.A.D.		
1963–64	Chatteris Town	Glinton United	Peterborough Rovers	Balding & Mansell	Spalding Youth Old Boys		
1964–65	Chatteris Town	Crowland Town	Leverington Sports	Whittlesey Rovers	R.A.F. (Wittering)		
1965–66	Chatteris Town	Whittlesey United	Stamford Belvedere	Newalls Sports	Kings Cliffe		
1966–67	Parsons Drove	Peterborough Rovers	Diesel Athletic	Wimblington Old Boys	Deeping Rangers		
1967–68	Parsons Drove	Stamford Belvedere	Eye United	Parson Drove Reserves	Thurlby United		
1968–69	Parsons Drove	Glinton United	Deeping Rangers	Yaxley (British Legion)	Pinchbeck United Reserves		
Season	Premier Division	Division 1	Division 2	Division 3 (Southern Section)	Division 3 (Northern Section)	Division 4	
1969–70	Parsons Drove	Deeping Rangers	Parson Drove Reserves	Upwell Town	Stamford Belvedere Reserves	Stilton United	
1970–71	Parsons Drove	Stamford Belvedere	Yaxley (British Legion)	Whittlesey United Reserves	Hotpoint	Phorpres Sports	
1971–72	Peterborough Rovers	Eye United	Spalding United Reserves	Phorpres Sports	Thorney	Stamford YMCA	
1972–73	Parsons Drove	Eye United	Phorpres Sports	GPO Sports	Blackstones Works Reserves	Wittering Sports	
1973–74	Downham Town	Phorpres Sports	GPO Sports	Yaxley Reserves	Stamford YMCA	Doddington United	
1974–75	Huntingdon United	GPO Sports	Fengate	Coates Athletic	Wittering Sports	Ortonians Reserves	
1975–76	Huntingdon United	Blackstones Works	Yaxley Reserves	Brotherhoods	Blackstones Works Reserves	Pearl Assurance	
1976–77	Yaxley	Whittlesey United	Doddington United	Wisbech St. Mary	B.R.A.D.	March Youth Club	
Season	Premier Division	Division 1	Division 2	Division 3	Division 4	Division 5	
1977–78	Phorpres Sports	Spalding United Reserves	Eye United Reserves	St. Ives Town	Perkins Sports Reserves	Fletton Ex-Servicemen	
Season	Premier Division	Division 1	Division 2	Division 3	Division 4	Division 5	Division 6
1978–79	Downham Town	Perkins Sports	March Town United Reserves	March Youth Club	Fletton Ex-Servicemen	Molins	Huntingdon United Reserves
1979–80	Eye United	Ortonians	Stamford YMCA	Peterborough Rovers Reserves	Whittlesey United Reserves	Moulton Harrox	Somersham Town Reserves
1980–81	Eye United	Ortonians	Yaxley Reserves	Brotherhoods	Moulton Harrox	Ortonians Reserves	Longthorpe Albion
1981–82	Eye United	St. Ives Town	Chatteris Town Reserves	Huntingdon Town	St. Ives Town Reserves	Longthorpe Albion	Freemans Sports
1982–83	Ortonians	Perkins Sports	Coates Athletic	Fletton Ex-Servicemen	Molins	Alconbury	Murrow Bell
1983–84	Yaxley	Yaxley Reserves	Fletton Ex-Servicemen	Molins	Freemans Sports	Ortonians 'A'	Crosfield
1984–85	King's Lynn Reserves	Fletton Ex-Servicemen	St. Ives Town Reserves	Somersham Town Reserves	Crowland Town	Blackstones Works 'A'	Long Sutton Athletic
1985–86	Perkins Sports	Blackstones Works Reserves	Woodhouse & Sturnham	Crowland Town	Nene	Long Sutton Athletic	Juventus
1986–87	Downham Town	Stamford Belvedere	Crowland Town	Gedney Hill	Long Sutton Athletic	Molins Reserves	Eastfield Rovers
1987–88	Downham Town	Molins	Thomas Cook	Long Sutton Athletic	Juventus	Newborough	Woodhouse & Sturnham Reserves
Season	Premier Division	Division 1	Division 2	Division 3	Division 4	Division 5	
1988–89	Perkins Sports	Whittlesey United Reserves	Juventus	Doddington United	Hotpoint	Outwell Swifts	
1989–90	Pinchbeck United	Manea United	Moulton Harrox	March Town United 'A'	Outwell Swifts	Wisbech Town 'A'	
1990–91	Pinchbeck United	Ryhall United	Hotpoint	Outwell Swifts	Wisbech Town 'A'	Goldhay United	
1991–92	Molins	Deeping Rangers Reserves	Outwell Swifts	Sawtry	Ketton	Hotpoint Reserves	
1992–93	Perkins Sports	Hotpoint	Kings Cliffe	Molins Reserves	Hotpoint Reserves	Thorney Reserves	
1993–94	Ortonians	Outwell Swifts	Ketton	Eye United Reserves	Whittlesey Blue Stars	Langtoft United	
Season	Premier Division	Division 1	Division 2	Division 3	Division 4	Division 5	Division 6
1994–95	Perkins Sports	Ortonians Reserves	Oundle Town Reserves	Oakham Town	Langtoft United	Sawtry Reserves	Papa Luigi
1995–96	Leverington Sports	Ortonians Reserves	Hotpoint Reserves	Silver Jubilee	Brotherhoods Reserves	Long Sutton Athletic	Werrington Town
1996–97	Ortonians	Alconbury	Silver Jubilee	Parson Drove	Long Sutton Athletic	Werrington Town	Peterborough Railway
1997–98	Oundle Town	Deeping Rangers Reserves	Parson Drove	Long Sutton Athletic	Papa Luigi	Wimblington Old Boys	Cross Keys
1998–99	Perkins Sports	Stilton United	Long Sutton Athletic	Werrington Town	Wimblington Old Boys	Emneth Seniors	Long Sutton Athletic Reserves
1999–2000	Eye United	ICA Juventus	Deeping Rangers 'A'	Wimblington Old Boys	Emneth Seniors	Silver Jubilee Reserves	Bearings Direct Reserves
2000–01	Eye United	ICA Juventus	Wimblington Old Boys	Woodlands	March St. Mary's	Long Sutton Athletic Reserves	Wimblington Old Boys Reserves
Season	Premier Division	Division 1	Division 2	Division 3	Division 4	Division 5	
2001–02	Pearl Assurance	Wimblington Old Boys	Emneth Seniors	Sawtry	Ramsey Town Reserves	Castor & Ailsworth	
2002–03	Eye United	Emneth Seniors	Crowland Town	Wimblington Harriers	Castor & Ailsworth	Guyhirn Athletic	
2003–04	Ortonians	Parson Drove	Hereward Old Boys	Deeping Rangers 'B'	Stilton United	Wimblington Old Boys Reserves	
2004–05	Whittlesey United	Crowland Town	Wimblington Harriers	Sutton Bridge	Coates Athletic	Netherton United Reserves	
Season	Premier Division	Division One	Division Two	Combination Division One	Combination Division Two	Combination Division Three	
2005–06	Ortonians	Woodlands	Thorney	Perkins Sports Reserves	Chatteris Town Reserves	Pinchbeck United Reserves	
2006–07	Peterborough Sports			A.F.C. Fletton Reserves	Langtoft United Reserves	Silver Jubilee Reserves	
2007–08	Perkins Sports			Whittlesey United Reserves	Wimblington Reserves	Ramsey Town 'A'	
2008–09	Ramsey Town	Coates Athletic	Manea United	Whittlesey United Reserves	Netherton United Reserves	Peterborough Rovers Reserves	
2009–10	Rutland Rangers	Eye Sports & Social	Langtoft United	Holbeach United Reserves	Alconbury Reserves	Peterborough Sports Parkway Reserves	
2010–11	Ramsey Town	King's Cliffe United	Whittlesey Blue Star	Holbeach United Reserves	Crowland Town Reserves	Oundle Town Reserves	
Season	Premier Division	Division One	Division Two	Division Three	Division Four	Division Five	
2011–12	Pinchbeck United	Riverside Rovers	Ryhall United	Langtoft United Reserves	Woodston Dynamo	Riverside Rovers Reserves	
2012–13	Moulton Harrox	King's Lynn Town Reserves	Peterborough Sports Parkway Reserves	Whittlesey United Reserves	Wittering	Peterborough Sports Parkway 'A'	
2013–14	King's Lynn Town Reserves	Thorney	Baston	Wittering	Spalding Town	Bretton North End	
2014–15	Oakham United	Coates Athletic Reserves	ICA Sports 'A'	Peterborough Sports 'A'	Bretton North End	AFC Stanground Reserves	
2015–16	Moulton Harrox	Stamford Lions	Oakham United Reserves	Stanground Sports	Brotherhood Sports	Limetree UTR	
2016–17	Peterborough Sports Reserves	Moulton Harrox Reserves	Ramsey Town	Bretton North End	Premiair	Peterborough NECI	
2017–18	Netherton United	Moulton Harrox Reserves	FC Parson Drove	Cardea	Eunice Huntingdon	AFC Orton	
2018–19	Moulton Harrox	FC Parson Drove	Stilton United	Peterborough NECI	Glinton & Northborough	Stanground Sports	
2019–20	Void	Void	Void	Void	Void	Void	
2020–21	Void	Void	Void	Void	Void	Void	
2021–22	Uppingham Town	Warboys Town	Peterborough City	Sawtry	Thorpe Wood Rangers	Peterborough Rangers	
2022–23	Uppingham Town	Sawtry	Cardea	Peterborough Rangers	YDP		
2023–24	Moulton Harrox	Peterborough City	Peterborough Rangers	Bourne Town 'A'	Moulton Harrox Reserves		
2024–25	Uppingham Town	Stamford Belvedere	Netherton United Reserves	Wittering	Thorpe Wood Rangers		
2025–26	Netherton United	Long Sutton Athletic	Stanground Cardea Sports	Thorpe Wood Rangers	Alconbury Weald Reserves		

=== Veterans Champions ===
Season	Veterans Division 1				
2012–13	Stamford Belvedere Veterans				
2013–14	Moulton Harrox Veterans				
2014–15	Stamford Belvedere Veterans				
Season	Veterans Division 1	Veterans Division 2			
2016–17	Netherton United Veterans	Bretton North End Veterans			
Season	Veterans Division 1	Veterans Division 2	Veterans Division 3		
2017–18	Stamford Belvedere Veterans	Peterborough Sports Veterans	Stamford Lions Veterans		
Season	Veterans Premier Division	Veterans East Division	Veterans West Division		
2018–19	Peterborough Sports Veterans	Peterborough Polonia Veterans	Oakham United Veterans		
2019–20	Void	Void	Void		
Season	Veterans Premier Division	Veterans East Division	Veterans West Division	Veterans Central Division	
2020–21	Void	Void	Void	Void	
2021–22	Wittering Premiair Veterans	Bushfield Park Veterans	Ketton & Casterton Veterans	Kings Cliffe Exiles Veterans	
Season	Veterans Premier Division	Veterans East Division	Veterans North Division	Veterans Central Division	
2022–23	Wittering Premiair Veterans Reserves	Eunice Huntingdon Veterans	Deeping Rangers Veterans	Crowland Town Veterans	
Season	Veterans Premier Division	Veterans East Division	Veterans North Division	Veterans Central Division	Veterans South Division
2023–24	Whittlesey Athletic Veterans	Stamford Lions Veterans	Sleaford Town Rangers Veterans	Peterborough City Veterans	Eynesbury Rovers Veterans

=== PFA Senior Cup ===
- 1995–96 Ortonians
- 1996–97 Deeping Rangers
- 1997–98 Wisbech Town Reserves
- 1998–99 Perkins Sports
- 1999–2000 Oundle Town
- 2000–01 Eye United
- 2001–02 Eye United
- 2002–03 Eye United
- 2003–04 Ortonians
- 2004–05 Ortonians
- 2005–06 Deeping Sports
- 2006–07 Alconbury
- 2007–08 Perkins Sports
- 2008–09 Rutland Rangers
- 2009–10 Rutland Rangers
- 2010–11 Moulton Harrox
- 2011–12 Pinchbeck United
- 2012–13 Moulton Harrox
- 2013–14 ICA Sports
- 2014–15 Coates Athletic
- 2015-16 Whittlesey Athletic
- 2016-17 ICA Sports
- 2017-18 Netherton United
- 2018-19 Whittlesey Athletic
- 2019-20 Void
- 2020-21 Uppingham Town
- 2021-22 Not held
- 2022-23 Uppingham Town
- 2023–24 Oakham United
- 2024–25 Warboys Town
- 2025–26 Netherton United
