= 2011–12 FA Cup qualifying rounds =

Tournament details
- Country: England; Wales

The 2011–12 FA Cup qualifying rounds opened the 131st season of competition in England for 'The Football Association Challenge Cup' (FA Cup), the world's oldest association football single knockout competition. A new record 763 clubs were accepted for the competition, up four from the previous season's 759.

The large number of clubs entering the tournament from lower down (Levels 5 through 10) in the English football pyramid meant that the competition started with six rounds of preliminary (2) and qualifying (4) knockouts for these non-League teams. The 32 winning teams from the fourth qualifying round progressed to the First round proper, where League teams tiered at Levels 3 and 4 entered the competition.

== Calendar and prizes ==
The calendar for the 2011–12 FA Cup qualifying rounds, as announced by the FA.

Round	Main date	Leagues entering at this round	New entries this round	Winners from previous round	Number of fixtures	Prize money
Extra preliminary round	20 August 2011	Levels 9-10	408	none	204	£750
Preliminary round	3 September 2011	Level 8	130	204	167	£1,500
First qualifying round	17 September 2011	Level 7	65	167	116	£3,000
Second qualifying round	1 October 2011	Conference North; Conference South	44	116	80	£4,500
Third qualifying round	15 October 2011	none	none	80	40	£7,500
Fourth qualifying round	29 October 2011	Conference Premier	24	40	32	£12,500
For the next rounds look 2011–12 FA Cup

== Extra preliminary round ==
Extra preliminary round ties were played on the weekend of 20 August 2011. 408 clubs from Level 9 and Level 10 of English football, entered at this stage of the competition.

Tie	Home team (tier)	Score	Away team (tier)	Att.
1	Bedlington Terriers (9)	1–0	Whickham (10)	130
2	Tow Law Town (9)	1–2	Marske United (9)	81
3	Stokesley Sports Club (9)	1–6	Newcastle Benfield (9)	46
4	Penrith (9)	1–1	North Shields (10)	90
replay	North Shields (10)	0–1	Penrith (9)	116
5	West Allotment Celtic (10)	1–1	Northallerton Town (10)	80
replay	Northallerton Town (10)	2–1 (a.e.t.)	West Allotment Celtic (10)	118
6	Spennymoor Town (9)	1–0	Esh Winning (10)	183
7	Ryton & Crawcrook Albion (10)	0–1	Ashington (9)	57
8	Gillford Park (10)	1–2	Hebburn Town (10)	36
9	Newton Aycliffe (9)	2–7	Billingham Synthonia (9)	330
10	Crook Town (10)	2–6	Billingham Town (9)	93
11	Chester-le-Street Town (10)	1–1	South Shields (9)	104
replay	South Shields (9)	2–1	Chester-le-Street Town (10)	128
12	West Auckland Town (9)	2–2	Dunston UTS (9)	103
replay	Dunston UTS (9)	5–1	West Auckland Town (9)	226
13	Jarrow Roofing BCA (9)	1–2	Guisborough Town (9)	41
14	Sunderland RCA (9)	7–0	Birtley Town (10)	141
15	Shildon (9)	2–1	Consett (9)	166
16	Whitehaven (10)	3–0	Norton & Stockton Ancients (9)	38
17	Whitley Bay (9)	2–1	Bishop Auckland (9)	456
18	Scarborough Athletic (9)	4–0	Hallam (10)	452
19	Thackley (9)	2–1	Askern Villa (10)	56
20	Maltby Main (9)	1–2	Glasshoughton Welfare (10)	45
21	Silsden (9)	1–1	Rossington Main (10)	92
replay	Rossington Main (10)	2–2 (2–4 p)	Silsden (9)	85
22	Pontefract Collieries (10)	2–0	Yorkshire Amateur (10)	91
23	Parkgate (9)	4–1	Grimsby Borough (10)	40
24	AFC Emley (10)	1–4	Hall Road Rangers (9)	131
25	Hemsworth Miners Welfare (10)	1–2	Tadcaster Albion (9)	91
26	Nostell Miners Welfare (9)	2–3	Armthorpe Welfare (9)	72
27	Selby Town (9)	1–4	Liversedge (9)	107
28	Pickering Town (9)	2–0	Dinnington Town (10)	157
29	Staveley Miners Welfare (9)	3–0	Winterton Rangers (9)	102
30	Barton Town Old Boys (9)	2–2	Bridlington Town (9)	134
replay	Bridlington Town (9)	2–3	Barton Town Old Boys (9)	149
31	Squires Gate (9)	1–0	Colne (9)	67
32	Formby (10)	3–0	Alsager Town (9)	65
33	Winsford United (9)	1–1	Maine Road (9)	110
replay	Maine Road (9)	1–0	Winsford United (9)	109
34	Runcorn Town (9)	4–1	Brighouse Town (9)	110
35	Padiham (9)	1–2	Ashton Athletic (9)	127
36	Holker Old Boys (10)	3–0	Leek County School Old Boys (10)	62
37	Bacup Borough (9)	2–3	AFC Blackpool (9)	62
38	St. Helens Town (9)	0–2	Atherton Laburnum Rovers (9)	46
39	Atherton Collieries (10)	4–0	Irlam (10)	60
40	Chadderton (10)	2–8	Cheadle Town (10)	79
41	Congleton Town (9)	3–1	Eccleshill United (10)	89
42	Barnoldswick Town (9)	0–2	Ramsbottom United (9)	177
43	Bootle (9)	2–0	Wigan Robin Park (10)	96
44	AFC Liverpool (9)	2–2	Runcorn Linnets (9)	222
replay	Runcorn Linnets (9)	3–1	AFC Liverpool (9)	320
45	Retford United (9)	0–2	Gresley (9)	206
46	Holbeach United (9)	3–1	Lincoln Moorlands Railway (10)	93
47	Deeping Rangers (9)	2–1	Spalding United (9)	149
48	Holbrook Sports (10)	1–1	Greenwood Meadows (10)	51
replay	Greenwood Meadows (10)	0–2	Holbrook Sports (10)	34
49	Glossop North End (9)	2–4	Boston Town (9)	219
50	Dunkirk (9)	0–2	Arnold Town (9)	91
51	Radcliffe Olympic (10)	2–3	Heanor Town (10)	79
52	Borrowash Victoria (10)	5–1	Sleaford Town (9)	74
53	Gedling Miners Welfare (10)	0–0	Louth Town (10)	52
replay	Louth Town (10)	2–1	Gedling Miners Welfare (10)	117
54	Shirebrook Town (10)	2–1	Blackstones (9)	82
55	Nuneaton Griff (10)	0–7	Stratford Town (9)	105
56	Rocester (9)	3–1	Wolverhampton Casuals (10)	94
57	Southam United (10)	0–2	Tipton Town (9)	79
58	Coleshill Town (9)	5–1	Brocton (10)	50
59	Highgate United (9)	2–0	Willenhall Town (9)	68
60	Westfields (9)	2–4	Norton United (10)	107
61	Castle Vale (10)	3–1	Heath Hayes (9)	80
62	Bustleholme (10)	0–1	Eccleshall (10)	104
63	Lye Town (10)	0–5	Coventry Sphinx (9)	134
64	Studley (9)	2–1	Walsall Wood (10)	60
65	Boldmere St. Michaels (9)	5–2	Bartley Green (10)	55
66	Malvern Town (10)	0–0	Causeway United (9)	131
replay	Causeway United (9)	5–0	Malvern Town (10)	45
67	Bridgnorth Town (9)	6–0	Ellesmere Rangers (9)	102
68	Atherstone Town (9)	1–0	Cadbury Athletic (10)	142
69	Tividale (9)	1–2	Alvechurch (9)	104
70	Gornal Athletic (10)	2–2	Shifnal Town (10)	52
replay	Shifnal Town (10)	3–4 (a.e.t.)	Gornal Athletic (10)	78
71	Stone Dominoes (9)	3–2	Wellington (Herefords) (10)	42
72	Cradley Town (10)	2–2	Continental Star (10)	45
replay	Continental Star (10)	3–2	Cradley Town (10)	60
73	Bloxwich United (10)	2–2	AFC Wulfrunians (10)	75
replay	AFC Wulfrunians (10)	3–0	Bloxwich United (10)	75
74	Pegasus Juniors (10)	1–1	Bewdley Town (10)	43
replay	Bewdley Town (10)	2–1	Pegasus Juniors (10)	51
75	Friar Lane & Epworth (11)	w/o	Loughborough University (9)	N/A
Walkover for Loughborough University – Friar Lane & Epworth withdrew
76	Thrapston Town (9)	3–2	Irchester United (9)	182
77	Oadby Town (10)	6–1	Northampton Spencer (9)	101
78	Rushden & Higham United (10)	2–3	Cogenhoe United (9)	92
79	Rothwell Corinthians (10)	1–0	Wellingborough Town (9)	77
80	Bugbrooke St Michaels (10)	2–1	Anstey Nomads (10)	107
81	Long Eaton United (9)	0–4	Huntingdon Town (10)	36
82	Long Buckby (9)	1–0	Stewarts & Lloyds Corby (9)	52
83	Thurnby Nirvana (10)	3–3	Desborough Town (9)	57
replay	Desborough Town (9)	0–5	Thurnby Nirvana (10)	57
84	Rothwell Town (10)	2–1	Raunds Town (10)	74
85	Barrow Town (10)	3–2	Kirby Muxloe (9)	112
86	Daventry United (9)	2–1	Bardon Hill (10)	36
87	Yaxley (9)	0–2	Godmanchester Rovers (10)	90
88	Stanway Rovers (9)	2–3	Hadleigh United (9)	129
89	King's Lynn Town (9)	6–1	Whitton United (10)	632
90	Woodbridge Town (9)	2–2	Gorleston (9)	114
replay	Gorleston (9)	2–1	Woodbridge Town (9)	110
91	St Ives Town (9)	3–2	Debenham LC (10)	130
92	Wroxham (9)	3–1	Dereham Town (9)	181
93	Ipswich Wanderers (10)	3–1	Newmarket Town (9)	62
94	Mildenhall Town (9)	0–4	Brantham Athletic (9)	108
95	Walsham-le-Willows (9)	3–1	Thetford Town (10)	126
96	March Town United (10)	2–1	Kirkley & Pakefield (9)	92
97	Ely City (9)	4–0	Diss Town (9)	103
98	Stowmarket Town (10)	1–4	Haverhill Rovers (9)	94
99	Felixstowe & Walton United (9)	1–0	Norwich United (9)	60
100	Long Melford (10)	w/o	Saffron Walden Town (10*)	N/A
Walkover for Long Melford – Saffron Walden Town withdrew
101	Wisbech Town (9)	4–0	Halstead Town (10)	246
102	Great Yarmouth Town (9)	0–3	FC Clacton (9)	116

Tie	Home team (tier)	Score	Away team (tier)	Att.
103	Burnham Ramblers (9)	1–1	Barking (9)	71
replay	Barking (9)	0–1	Burnham Ramblers (9)	75
104	Hadley (9)	2–2	Cockfosters (10)	47
replay	Cockfosters (10)	0–0 (5–4 p)	Hadley (9)	84
105	Haringey Borough (9)	2–0	AFC Kempston Rovers (9)	48
106	Witham Town (9)	4–1	Bedford (10)	87
107	St. Margaretsbury (9)	0–3	Dunstable Town (9)	74
108	Enfield 1893 (9)	3–1	London Colney (10)	71
109	Kings Langley (10)	5–2	Stotfold (9)	54
Walkover for Stotfold – Kings Langley removed
110	Colney Heath (9)	3–1	Langford (10)	44
111	Clapton (9)	0–1	Stansted (9)	42
112	Crawley Green Sports (10)	1–2	Berkhamsted (9)	62
113	Hullbridge Sports (9)	1–3	Royston Town (9)	53
114	Broxbourne Borough V&E (9)	4–0	Hoddesdon Town (10)	135
115	Haringey & Waltham Development (9)	4–1	Bowers & Pitsea (9)	73
116	Sawbridgeworth Town (9)	2–2	Hatfield Town (9)	43
replay	Hatfield Town (9)	2–1	Sawbridgeworth Town (9)	73
117	AFC Dunstable (9)	3–1	Eton Manor (9)	94
118	Biggleswade United (9)	2–1	Leverstock Green (9)	54
119	Takeley (9)	3–3	Southend Manor (9)	69
replay	Southend Manor (9)	3–2	Takeley (9)	25
120	London APSA (9)	1–0	Basildon United (9)	55
121	Oxhey Jets (9)	6–0	Wodson Park (10)	31
122	Barkingside (9)	1–3	Hertford Town (9)	197
123	Bethnal Green United (9)	2–1	Kentish Town (10)	38
124	Holmer Green (10)	2–4	Harefield United (9)	80
125	Sandhurst Town (9)	2–3	Thame United (9)	58
126	Witney Town (9)	0–4	Newport Pagnell Town (9)	94
127	Tring Athletic (9)	1–0	Hanwell Town (9)	68
128	Wokingham & Emmbrook (9)	4–1	Holyport (9)	106
129	Staines Lammas (10)	3–0	Clanfield (10)	96
130	Bicester Town (9)	w/o	Bedfont Sports (10)	N/A
Walkover for Bedfont Sports – Bicester Town folded
131	Old Woodstock Town (10)	1–2	Wantage Town (9)	38
132	Ascot United (9)	1–2	Wembley (9)	1,149
133	Abingdon Town (9)	4–0	Milton United (10)	56
134	Kidlington (9)	4–2	Hillingdon Borough (9)	62
135	Hanworth Villa (9)	4–2	Shrivenham (9)	101
136	Ardley United (9)	3–0	Flackwell Heath (9)	48
137	Aylesbury United (9)	4–0	Bracknell Town (9)	128
138	Reading Town (9)	0–0	Binfield (9)	59
replay	Binfield (9)	3–0	Reading Town (9)	118
139	Molesey (9)	0–3	Egham Town (9)	132
140	Raynes Park Vale (9)	3–1	Hassocks (9)	48
141	Farnham Town (9)	1–0	Guildford City (9)	70
142	Wick (10)	0–3	Redhill (9)	57
143	VCD Athletic (9)	1–1	Bookham (10)	53
replay	Bookham (10)	0–2	VCD Athletic (9)	65
144	Erith & Belvedere (9)	2–0	St. Francis Rangers (9)	57
145	Lancing (9)	2–2	Horsham YMCA (9)	92
replay	Horsham YMCA (9)	2–5	Lancing (9)	66
146	Chichester City (9)	2–2	Fisher (9)	82
replay	Fisher (9)	6–1	Chichester City (9)	75
147	Pagham (9)	1–2	Herne Bay (9)	75
148	Colliers Wood United (9)	1–1	Chessington & Hook United (9)	41
replay	Chessington & Hook United (9)	2–1	Colliers Wood United (9)	63
149	Ringmer (9)	0–2	Deal Town (9)	64
150	Arundel (9)	2–2	Sidley United (9)	65
replay	Sidley United (9)	1–5 (a.e.t.)	Arundel (9)	59
151	Three Bridges (9)	1–6	Camberley Town (9)	52
152	Sevenoaks Town (9)	4–0	Ash United (9)	45
153	Shoreham (9)	3–1	Holmesdale (9)	50
154	Corinthian (9)	4–3	Dorking (9)	48
155	Mole Valley SCR (9)	2–3	Lordswood (9)	22
156	Westfield (Surrey) (10)	3–6	Peacehaven & Telscombe (9)	90
157	Tunbridge Wells (9)	1–0	Warlingham (10)	158
158	South Park (9)	1–0	AFC Uckfield (9)	72
159	Greenwich Borough (9)	1–2	Horley Town (9)	
160	Banstead Athletic (9)	3–0	Woodstock Sports (9)	58
161	Littlehampton Town (10)	1–3	Beckenham Town (9)	33
162	Erith Town (9)	6–2	Crowborough Athletic (9)	46
163	Selsey (9)	2–2	Mile Oak (10)	105
replay	Mile Oak (10)	1–2	Selsey (9)	63
164	Epsom & Ewell (9)	3–1	Croydon (9)	124
165	Cobham (10)	2–2	Badshot Lea (9)	105
replay	Badshot Lea (9)	4–1	Cobham (10)	45
166	Hailsham Town (10)	0–4	Lingfield (9)	93
167	Bridport (9)	2–2	Hayling United (9)	141
replay	Hayling United (9)	0–2	Bridport (9)	48
168	Cowes Sports (10)	1–4	Newport (Isle of Wight) (9)	234
169	Verwood Town (10)	0–4	Horndean (9)	73
170	Romsey Town (9)	0–1	Brading Town (9)	33
171	Downton (9)	3–3	Brockenhurst (10)	65
replay	Brockenhurst (10)	4–2	Downton (9)	70
172	Alresford Town (9)	4–0	Devizes Town (10)	45
173	Totton & Eling (9)	5–1	Fareham Town (9)	54
174	Cove (9)	0–2	AFC Portchester (10)	62
175	Petersfield Town (10)	1–2	Hartley Wintney (10)	71
176	Hamworthy United (9)	1–2	Bournemouth (9)	107
177	Shrewton United (10)	1–0	Fleet Spurs (10)	177
178	Winchester City (9)	5–0	Ringwood Town (10)	105
179	Whitchurch United (10)	3–2	Bemerton Heath Harlequins (9)	86
180	Alton Town (9)	1–1	New Milton Town (9)	45
replay	New Milton Town (9)	0–6	Alton Town (9)	47
181	Lymington Town (9)	3–2	Sherborne Town (9)	85
182	Blackfield & Langley (9)	3–1	GE Hamble (9)	54
183	Gillingham Town (10)	1–2	Newbury (10)	136
184	Moneyfields (9)	2–0	Christchurch (9)	60
185	Welton Rovers (10)	0–5	Larkhall Athletic (9)	71
186	Melksham Town (10)	3–2	Almondsbury UWE (10)	85
187	Hallen (9)	3–0	Calne Town (10)	64
188	Fairford Town (9)	3–0	Wellington (Somerset) (10)	53
189	Street (9)	0–2	Shortwood United (9)	92
190	Radstock Town (9)	2–1	Wootton Bassett Town (10)	75
191	Brislington (9)	4–1	Lydney Town (10)	61
192	Pewsey Vale (10)	0–2	Bishop Sutton (9)	92
193	Slimbridge (9)	3–1	Bradford Town (10)	66
194	Merthyr Town (9)	2–2	Bitton (9)	323
replay	Bitton (9)	1–2	Merthyr Town (9)	248
195	Bristol Manor Farm (9)	1–1	Longwell Green Sports (9)	83
replay	Longwell Green Sports (9)	3–2	Bristol Manor Farm (9)	90
196	Hengrove Athletic (10)	0–3	Wells City (9)	39
197	Highworth Town (9)	1–4	Odd Down (9)	76
198	Corsham Town (9)	1–6	Cadbury Heath (10)	65
199	Bodmin Town (10)	6–3	Falmouth Town (10)	94
200	Dawlish Town (9)	w/o	Tavistock (10)	N/A
Walkover for Tavistock – Dawlish Town folded
201	St. Blazey (10)	1–0	Saltash United (10)	80
202	Chard Town (10)	1–2	Torpoint Athletic (10)	106
203	Willand Rovers (9)	0–1	Barnstaple Town (9)	100
204	Buckland Athletic (10)	4–0	Ilfracombe Town (9)	81

== Preliminary round ==
Preliminary round fixtures were played on the weekend of 3 September 2011. A total of 334 clubs took part in this stage of the competition, including the 204 winners from the extra preliminary round and 130 entering at this stage from the six leagues at Level 8 of English football, while Ilkeston and Farsley from Northern Premier League were ineligible to participate as they only spent their second seasons. The round featured 48 clubs from Level 10 still in the competition, being the lowest ranked teams in this round.

Tie	Home team (tier)	Score	Away team (tier)	Att.
1	Newcastle Benfield (9)	1–1	South Shields (9)	104
replay	South Shields (9)	0–3	Newcastle Benfield (9)	104
2	Dunston UTS (9)	4–0	Durham City (8)	262
3	Spennymoor Town (9)	1–0	Sunderland RCA (9)	182
4	Guisborough Town (9)	0–1	Shildon (9)	182
5	Bedlington Terriers (9)	6–0	Billingham Town (9)	150
6	Whitley Bay (9)	2–0	Marske United (9)	524
7	Hebburn Town (10)	2–2	Whitehaven (10)	67
replay	Whitehaven (10)	2–4	Hebburn Town (10)	49
8	Penrith (9)	3–2	Billingham Synthonia (9)	135
9	Ashington (9)	2–1	Northallerton Town (10)	176
10	Wakefield (8)	1–0	Thackley (9)	117
11	Liversedge (9)	2–2	Pickering Town (9)	130
replay	Pickering Town (9)	3–3 (5–4 p)	Liversedge (9)	137
12	Armthorpe Welfare (9)	2–0	Brigg Town (8)	81
13	Silsden (9)	1–1	Harrogate Railway Athletic (8)	161
replay	Harrogate Railway Athletic (8)	2–0	Silsden (9)	79
14	Pontefract Collieries (10)	2–3	Tadcaster Albion (9)	90
15	Garforth Town (8)	3–2	Sheffield (8)	162
16	Ossett Town (8)	0–0	Glasshoughton Welfare (10)	98
replay	Glasshoughton Welfare (10)	1–3	Ossett Town (8)	72
17	Scarborough Athletic (9)	2–2	Barton Town Old Boys (9)	498
replay	Barton Town Old Boys (9)	0–1	Scarborough Athletic (9)	246
18	Goole (8)	1–1	Staveley Miners Welfare (9)	134
replay	Staveley Miners Welfare (9)	3–1	Goole (8)	140
19	Parkgate (9)	2–2	Hall Road Rangers (9)	84
replay	Hall Road Rangers (9)	2–0	Parkgate (9)	
Walkover for Parkgate – Hall Road Rangers removed for fielding an ineligible player
20	AFC Blackpool (9)	1–1	AFC Fylde (8)	283
replay	AFC Fylde (8)	3–2	AFC Blackpool (9)	156
21	Ramsbottom United (9)	2–1	Salford City (8)	345
22	Trafford (8)	3–0	Cheadle Town (10)	167
23	Ossett Albion (8)	0–6	Witton Albion (8)	215
24	Cammell Laird (8)	3–1	Atherton Laburnum Rovers (9)	79
25	Clitheroe (8)	4–0	Skelmersdale United	285
26	Prescot Cables (8)	0–2	Warrington Town (8)	263
27	Mossley (8)	0–0	Runcorn Linnets (9)	228
replay	Runcorn Linnets (9)	4–0	Mossley (8)	269
28	Formby (10)	1–4	Lancaster City (8)	142
29	Squires Gate (9)	1–0	Atherton Collieries (10)	65
30	Curzon Ashton (8)	1–1	Bamber Bridge (8)	135
replay	Bamber Bridge (8)	3–2	Curzon Ashton (8)	120
31	Woodley Sports (8)	3–1	Bootle (9)	76
32	Radcliffe Borough (8)	3–0	Holker Old Boys (10)	88
33	Maine Road (9)	0–0	Ashton Athletic (9)	110
replay	Ashton Athletic (9)	2–3	Maine Road (9)	58
34	Congleton Town (9)	0–6	Runcorn Town (9)	148
35	Deeping Rangers (9)	2–1	Belper Town (8)	124
36	New Mills (8)	3–2	Rainworth Miners Welfare (8)	148
37	Arnold Town (9)	5–1	Lincoln United (8)	91
38	Grantham Town (8)	1–0	Stamford (8)	240
39	Gresley (9)	1–1	Shirebrook Town (10)	303
replay	Shirebrook Town (10)	2–3 (a.e.t.)	Gresley (9)	166
40	Hucknall Town (8)	0–0	Holbeach United (9)	180
replay	Holbeach United (9)	1–3 (a.e.t.)	Hucknall Town (8)	226
41	Borrowash Victoria (10)	1–3	Carlton Town (8)	132
42	Holbrook Sports (10)	1–3	Louth Town (10)	42
43	Heanor Town (10)	2–1	Boston Town (9)	133
44	Castle Vale (10)	1–1	AFC Wulfrunians (10)	54
replay	AFC Wulfrunians (10)	3–3 (5–4 p)	Castle Vale (10)	46
45	Causeway United (9)	3–4	Leek Town (8)	150
46	Newcastle Town (8)	6–2	Studley (9)	94
47	Stourport Swifts (8)	1–1	Stone Dominoes (9)	84
replay	Stone Dominoes (9)	2–1	Stourport Swifts (8)	58
48	Alvechurch (9)	1–1	Eccleshall (10)	90
replay	Eccleshall (10)	2–3	Alvechurch (9)	90
49	Bedworth United (8)	2–1	Sutton Coldfield Town (8)	220
50	Rugby Town (8)	0–0	Gornal Athletic (10)	311
replay	Gornal Athletic (10)	4–3	Rugby Town (8)	100
51	Kidsgrove Athletic (8)	5–1	Atherstone Town (9)	196
52	Rocester (9)	2–1	Halesowen Town (8)	189
53	Stratford Town (9)	2–1	Coventry Sphinx (9)	244
54	Market Drayton Town (8)	0–2	Bewdley Town (10)	102
55	Continental Star (10)	1–2	Bridgnorth Town (9)	51
56	Romulus (8)	3–1	Norton United (10)	70
57	Tipton Town (9)	4–1	Highgate United (9)	95
58	Boldmere St. Michaels (9)	2–2	Coleshill Town (9)	129
replay	Coleshill Town (9)	0–1	Boldmere St. Michaels (9)	52
59	Shepshed Dynamo (8)	0–0	Thrapston Town (9)	107
replay	Thrapston Town (9)	2–1	Shepshed Dynamo (8)	86
60	Rothwell Town (10)	2–7	Barrow Town (10)	86
61	Thurnby Nirvana (10)	2–0	St Neots Town (8)	92
62	Cogenhoe United (9)	1–2	Loughborough Dynamo (8)	103
63	Rothwell Corinthians (10)	2–5	Long Buckby (9)	76
64	Woodford United (8)	0–0	Daventry Town (8)	190
replay	Daventry Town (8)	5–0	Woodford United (8)	85
65	Quorn (8)	0–0	Oadby Town (10)	155
replay	Oadby Town (10)	0–1 (a.e.t.)	Quorn (8)	153
66	Loughborough University (9)	4–1	Godmanchester Rovers (10)	57
67	Coalville Town (8)	3–4	Daventry United (9)	212
68	Bugbrooke St Michaels (10)	1–2	Huntingdon Town (10)	95
69	Leiston (8)	5–0	FC Clacton (9)	147
70	Needham Market (8)	4–1	Felixstowe & Walton United (9)	237
71	Haverhill Rovers (9)	3–2	Brantham Athletic (9)	154
72	Ely City (9)	1–1	Walsham-le-Willows (9)	111
replay	Walsham-le-Willows (9)	1–2	Ely City (9)	75
73	King's Lynn Town (9)	2–1	Soham Town Rangers (8)	853
74	March Town United (10)	1–1	Wisbech Town (9)	1,109
replay	Wisbech Town (9)	3–2	March Town United (10)	830
75	Hadleigh United (9)	1–4	Heybridge Swifts (8)	122
76	St. Ives Town (9)	0–0	AFC Sudbury (8)	223
replay	AFC Sudbury (8)	3–2 (a.e.t.)	St. Ives Town (9)	199
77	Maldon & Tiptree (8)	9–0	Ipswich Wanderers (10)	67
78	Wroxham (9)	1–0	Long Melford (10)	116
79	Gorleston (9)	2–0	Harlow Town (8)	144
80	Burnham Ramblers (9)	3–3	Hertford Town (9)	100
replay	Hertford Town (9)	2–2 (3–2 p)	Burnham Ramblers (9)	76
81	AFC Dunstable (9)	2–3	Grays Athletic (8)	196

Tie	Home team (tier)	Score	Away team (tier)	Att.
82	Dunstable Town (9)	1–1	Bethnal Green United (9)	110
replay	Bethnal Green United (9)	0–3	Dunstable Town (9)	41
83	Romford (8)	3–2	Royston Town (9)	191
84	Potters Bar Town (8)	1–3	Broxbourne Borough V&E (9)	81
85	Stotfold (9)	2–1	Enfield Town (8)	168
86	Tilbury (8)	3–1	Biggleswade United (9)	89
87	Hatfield Town (9)	1–1	Enfield 1893 (9)	78
replay	Enfield 1893 (9)	1–2	Hatfield Town (9)	65
88	Great Wakering Rovers (8)	1–1	Oxhey Jets (9)	70
replay	Oxhey Jets (9)	1–0	Great Wakering Rovers (8)	93
89	Haringey Borough (9)	0–1	Berkhamsted (9)	77
90	Cheshunt (8)	0–0	Southend Manor (9)	139
replay	Southend Manor (9)	4–2	Cheshunt (8)	70
91	Waltham Forest (8)	1–1	Ilford (8)	55
replay	Ilford (8)	2–3 (a.e.t.)	Waltham Forest (8)	57
92	Waltham Abbey (8)	6–1	Ware (8)	108
93	Colney Heath (9)	0–1	Brentwood Town (8)	74
94	Barton Rovers (8)	3–0	Witham Town (9)	155
95	Stansted (9)	4–0	London APSA (9)	90
96	Cockfosters (10)	1–2	Redbridge (8)	
97	Biggleswade Town (8)	5–5	Haringey & Waltham Development (9)	107
replay	Haringey & Waltham Development (9)	1–2	Biggleswade Town (8)	60
98	Newport Pagnell Town (9)	1–1	Thame United (9)	132
replay	Thame United (9)	1–1 (4–2 p)	Newport Pagnell Town (9)	79
99	Wokingham & Emmbrook (9)	3–0	Kidlington (9)	101
100	Bedfont Sports (10)	1–1	Hanworth Villa (9)	250
replay	Hanworth Villa (9)	2–0	Bedfont Sports (10)	193
101	Beaconsfield SYCOB (8)	2–1	Northwood (8)	122
102	Abingdon Town (9)	2–2	Didcot Town (8)	100
replay	Didcot Town (8)	3–2	Abingdon Town (9)	106
103	Slough Town (8)	3–1	Binfield (9)	291
104	Wantage Town (9)	1–2	Abingdon United (8)	98
105	Leighton Town (8)	2–0	Uxbridge (8)	126
106	Aylesbury United (9)	0–0	North Leigh (8)	171
replay	North Leigh (8)	4–2	Aylesbury United (9)	104
107	Wembley (9)	1–1	Ardley United (9)	87
replay	Ardley United (9)	1–2	Wembley (9)	80
108	AFC Hayes (8)	4–2	Tring Athletic (9)	79
109	Chalfont St. Peter (8)	4–2	Aylesbury (8)	119
110	Burnham (8)	2–1	Ashford Town (8)	103
111	North Greenford United (8)	2–1	Bedfont Town (8)	45
112	Staines Lammas (10)	2–2	Harefield United (9)	94
replay	Harefield United (9)	0–2	Staines Lammas (10)	56
113	Marlow (8)	1–0	Thatcham Town (8)	132
114	Chatham Town (8)	1–0	Croydon Athletic (8)	164
115	Badshot Lea (9)	0–1	Chertsey Town (8)	79
116	Folkestone Invicta (8)	2–2	Whyteleafe (8)	211
replay	Whyteleafe (8)	1–2'	Folkestone Invicta (8)	90
117	Corinthian (9)	0–9	Maidstone United (8)	231
118	Walton & Hersham (8)	3–1	Tunbridge Wells (9)	124
119	Thamesmead Town (8)	3–0	Burgess Hill Town (8)	47
120	Lingfield (9)	4–1	Fisher (9)	124
121	Crawley Down (8)	2–1	Farnham Town (9)	55
122	Erith & Belvedere (9)	4–1	Selsey (9)	92
123	Merstham (8)	1–1	Egham Town (9)	113
replay	Egham Town (9)	2–3	Merstham (8)	54
124	Dulwich Hamlet (8)	2–0	Eastbourne Town (8)	288
125	Sittingbourne (8)	2–1	Peacehaven & Telscombe (9)	117
126	Whitstable Town (8)	1–3	Worthing (8)	173
127	Epsom & Ewell (9)	1–2	Chipstead (8)	107
128	Banstead Athletic (9)	3–1	Arundel (9)	65
129	Whitehawk (8)	0–0	Ramsgate (8)	118
replay	Ramsgate (8)	0–1	Whitehawk (8)	88
130	Beckenham Town (9)	3–1	Walton Casuals (8)	108
131	Chessington & Hook United (9)	0–1	Hythe Town (8)	97
132	Lordswood (9)	0–1	VCD Athletic (9)	84
133	Bognor Regis Town (8)	5–1	Camberley Town (9)	427
134	Shoreham (9)	1–0	Lancing (9)	145
135	Herne Bay (9)	3–0	Deal Town (9)	196
136	Horley Town (9)	3–1	Corinthian-Casuals (8)	73
137	Raynes Park Vale (9)	0–1	Faversham Town (8)	71
138	Sevenoaks Town (9)	1–3	Redhill (9)	53
139	Erith Town (9)	2–0	South Park (9)	40
140	Totton & Eling (9)	1–2	Bournemouth (9)	42
141	Sholing (8)	9–1	Newbury (10)	117
142	Shrewton United (10)	0–1	Hungerford Town (8)	114
143	Fleet Town (8)	4–3	Alton Town (9)	142
144	Wimborne Town (8)	1–2	Godalming Town (8)	263
145	Whitchurch United (10)	2–1	Brading Town (9)	78
146	AFC Portchester (10)	2–2	Newport (Isle of Wight) (9)	507
replay	Newport (Isle of Wight) (9)	2–1	AFC Portchester (10)	128
147	Moneyfields (9)	2–1	Gosport Borough (8)	201
148	Winchester City (9)	1–3	Blackfield & Langley (9)	100
149	Andover (8)	w/o	Poole Town (8)	N/A
Walkover for Poole Town – Andover folded
150	Alresford Town (9)	1–4	Hartley Wintney (10)	63
151	Lymington Town (9)	1–1	Brockenhurst (10)	103
replay	Brockenhurst (10)	2–1	Lymington Town (9)	70
152	Horndean (9)	3–1	Bridport (9)	100
153	Yate Town (8)	10–1	Melksham Town (10)	123
154	Merthyr Town (9)	1–0	Longwell Green Sports (9)	289
155	Slimbridge (9)	1–2	Cadbury Heath (10)	81
156	Fairford Town (9)	1–3	Cinderford Town (8)	83
157	Shortwood United (9)	1–1	Bishop Sutton (9)	99
replay	Bishop Sutton (9)	4–1	Shortwood United (9)	86
158	Paulton Rovers (8)	1–2	Clevedon Town (8)	161
159	Mangotsfield United (8)	1–0	Hallen (9)	187
Walkover for Hallen – Mangotsfield United removed for fielding an ineligible player
160	Larkhall Athletic (9)	4–0	Odd Down (9)	192
161	Bishop's Cleeve (8)	0–1	Wells City (9)	98
162	Radstock Town (9)	1–2	Brislington (9)	50
163	St Blazey (10)	1–2	Tavistock (10)	105
164	Barnstaple Town (9)	1–2	Bodmin Town (10)	125
165	Taunton Town (8)	1–1	Buckland Athletic (10)	219
replay	Buckland Athletic (10)	0–2	Taunton Town (8)	176
166	Bideford (8)	4–0	Tiverton Town (8)	289
167	Torpoint Athletic (10)	2–5	Bridgwater Town (8)	138

== First qualifying round ==
The First qualifying round fixtures were played on the weekend of 17 September 2011, with replays being played the following mid-week. A total of 232 clubs took part in this stage of the competition, including the 167 winners from the preliminary round and 65 entering at this stage from the top division of the three leagues at Level 7 of English football, while Chester from Northern Premier League were ineligible to participate as they only spent their second season. The round featured sixteen clubs from Level 10 still in the competition, being the lowest ranked clubs in this round.

Tie	Home team (tier)	Score	Away team (tier)	Att.
1	Spennymoor Town (9)	2–1	Dunston UTS (9)	259
2	Bedlington Terriers (9)	4–0	Newcastle Benfield (9)	181
3	Kendal Town (7)	1–0	Whitley Bay (9)	289
4	Hebburn Town (10)	2–0	Penrith (9)	83
5	Shildon (9)	0–0	Ashington (9)	157
replay	Ashington (9)	2–2 (5–3 p)	Shildon (9)	229
6	Armthorpe Welfare (9)	1–1	Stocksbridge Park Steels (7)	115
replay	Stocksbridge Park Steels (7)	3–1	Armthorpe Welfare (9)	86
7	Garforth Town (8)	0–2	Frickley Athletic (7)	170
8	Pickering Town (9)	2–2	Staveley Miners Welfare (9)	118
replay	Staveley Miners Welfare (9)	4–0	Pickering Town (9)	124
9	Parkgate (9)	1–3	Whitby Town (7)	116
10	Wakefield (8)	4–0	Ossett Town (8)	102
11	North Ferriby United (7)	1–0	Worksop Town (7)	168
12	Bradford Park Avenue (7)	8–0	Harrogate Railway Athletic (8)	265
13	Tadcaster Albion (9)	3–0	Scarborough Athletic (9)	472
14	Ashton United (7)	5–1	Runcorn Town (9)	100
15	F.C. United of Manchester (7)	1–1	Woodley Sports (8)	1,109
replay	Woodley Sports (8)	1–4	F.C. United of Manchester (7)	328
16	Bamber Bridge (8)	0–4	Warrington Town (8)	159
17	Squires Gate (9)	0–0	Runcorn Linnets (9)	179
replay	Runcorn Linnets (9)	1–0	Squires Gate (9)	325
18	Ramsbottom United (9)	1–2	Nantwich Town (7)	217
19	Lancaster City (8)	5–1	Maine Road (9)	176
20	AFC Fylde (8)	1–1	Chorley (7)	411
replay	Chorley (7)	0–1	AFC Fylde (8)	516
21	Witton Albion (8)	2–0	Marine (7)	246
22	Burscough (7)	2–2	Clitheroe (8)	137
replay	Clitheroe (8)	5–2	Burscough (7)	184
23	Cammell Laird (8)	1–2	Radcliffe Borough (8)	65
24	Trafford (8)	0–2	Northwich Victoria (7)	386
25	Deeping Rangers (9)	5–1	New Mills (8)	137
26	Louth Town (10)	0–2	Buxton (7)	335
27	Grantham Town (8)	2–0	Arnold Town (9)	201
28	Mickleover Sports (7)	4–2	Gresley (9)	315
29	Matlock Town (7)	2–0	Hucknall Town (8)	356
30	Carlton Town (8)	1–0	Heanor Town (10)	109
31	Romulus (8)	1–2	Bridgnorth Town (9)	101
32	Evesham United (7)	4–0	Rocester (9)	104
33	Leamington (7)	5–0	Boldmere St. Michaels (9)	422
34	Leek Town (8)	2–0	Tipton Town (9)	281
35	Kidsgrove Athletic (8)	3–0	Gornal Athletic (10)	160
36	Chasetown (7)	6–2	Alvechurch (9)	264
37	Rushall Olympic (7)	1–0	Bedworth United (8)	168
38	Bewdley Town (10)	1–2	Stourbridge (7)	301
39	Redditch United (7)	0–2	Hednesford Town (7)	348
40	AFC Wulfrunians (10)	2–3	Stafford Rangers (7)	304
41	Newcastle Town (8)	5–5	Stratford Town (9)	114
replay	Stratford Town (9)	6–2	Newcastle Town (8)	211
42	Barwell (7)	3–2	Stone Dominoes (9)	118
43	Thurnby Nirvana (10)	1–1	Barrow Town (10)	87
replay	Barrow Town (10)	3–1	Thurnby Nirvana (10)	113
44	Long Buckby (9)	4–1	Thrapston Town (9)	70
45	Huntingdon Town (10)	1–3	Daventry Town (8)	161
46	Quorn (8)	2–1	Loughborough University (9)	122
47	Loughborough Dynamo (8)	3–1	Daventry United (9)	103
48	Cambridge City (7)	2–2	Maldon & Tiptree (8)	266
replay	Maldon & Tiptree (8)	2–1	Cambridge City (7)	98
49	Needham Market (8)	1–1	Ely City (9)	224
replay	Ely City (9)	3–4 (a.e.t.)	Needham Market (8)	163
50	Leiston (8)	0–1	AFC Sudbury (8)	283
51	Bury Town (7)	3–0	Gorleston (9)	319
52	Heybridge Swifts (8)	1–2	Lowestoft Town (7)	198
53	Wisbech Town (9)	1–4	Wroxham (9)	441
54	King's Lynn Town (9)	1–0	Haverhill Rovers (9)	836
55	Tilbury (8)	1–2	Arlesey Town (7)	90
56	Waltham Forest (8)	2–0	Hitchin Town (7)	70
57	St. Albans City (7)	0–0	Berkhamsted (9)	351
replay	Berkhamsted (9)	0–3	St. Albans City (7)	306

Tie	Home team (tier)	Score	Away team (tier)	Att.
58	Wingate & Finchley (7)	0–3	Redbridge (8)	101
59	Barton Rovers (8)	1–1	Hatfield Town (9)	110
replay	Hatfield Town (9)	2–1	Barton Rovers (8)	144
60	AFC Hornchurch (7)	1–3	Concord Rangers (7)	235
61	Canvey Island (7)	4–1	Stansted (9)	259
62	Hemel Hempstead Town (7)	0–0	Brentwood Town (8)	245
replay	Brentwood Town (8)	0–0 (2–4 p)	Hemel Hempstead Town (7)	104
63	Grays Athletic (8)	1–2	Aveley (7)	257
64	Hertford Town (9)	0–1	Oxhey Jets (9)	164
65	East Thurrock United (7)	1–0	Bedford Town (7)	116
66	Biggleswade Town (8)	3–1	Waltham Abbey (8)	140
67	Billericay Town (7)	4–0	Stotfold (9)	319
68	Dunstable Town (9)	7–0	Broxbourne Borough V&E (9)	49
69	Southend Manor (9)	4–2	Romford (8)	139
70	Burnham (8)	1–0	Chalfont St. Peter (8)	93
71	Leatherhead (7)	5–1	North Leigh (8)	175
72	Chesham United (7)	3–2	Staines Lammas (10)	237
73	Wokingham & Emmbrook (9)	1–2	North Greenford United (8)	178
74	Leighton Town (8)	4–1	Abingdon United (8)	106
75	Oxford City (7)	1–1	Didcot Town (8)	209
replay	Didcot Town (8)	0–3	Oxford City (7)	162
76	Banbury United (7)	1–3	Slough Town (8)	349
77	AFC Hayes (8)	0–3	Hendon (7)	93
78	Harrow Borough (7)	2–0	Marlow (8)	113
79	Thame United (9)	2–0	Brackley Town (7)	217
80	Hanworth Villa (9)	1–0	Wembley (9)	106
81	Wealdstone (7)	0–2	Beaconsfield SYCOB (8)	266
82	Carshalton Athletic (7)	3–0	Faversham Town (8)	211
83	Herne Bay (9)	2–3	Erith Town (9)	222
84	Margate (7)	3–0	Tooting & Mitcham United (7)	340
85	Chertsey Town (8)	4–1	Lewes (7)	212
86	Hastings United (7)	0–3	Cray Wanderers (7)	201
87	Bognor Regis Town (8)	1–0	Sittingbourne (8)	402
88	Beckenham Town (9)	4–2	Metropolitan Police (7)	82
89	Chatham Town (8)	0–1	Worthing (8)	234
90	Banstead Athletic (9)	1–9	Maidstone United (8)	162
91	Merstham (8)	2–1	Walton & Hersham (8)	113
92	Crawley Down (8)	0–2	VCD Athletic (9)	75
93	Horley Town (9)	0–4	Dulwich Hamlet (8)	115
94	Chipstead (8)	3–1	Redhill (9)	106
95	Shoreham (9)	0–3	Thamesmead Town (8)	101
96	Hythe Town (8)	5–2	Erith & Belvedere (9)	215
97	Folkestone Invicta (8)	0–3	Whitehawk (8)	237
98	Horsham (7)	2–2	Lingfield (9)	237
replay	Lingfield (9)	2–4 (a.e.t.)	Horsham (7)	214
99	Hungerford Town (8)	3–1	Horndean (9)	78
100	Whitchurch United (10)	2–0	Brockenhurst (10)	200
101	Sholing (8)	2–1	Blackfield & Langley (9)	144
102	Poole Town (8)	3–0	Kingstonian (7)	507
103	Bournemouth (9)	2–1	Newport (Isle of Wight) (9)	65
104	Hartley Wintney (10)	1–0	Bashley (7)	155
105	AFC Totton (7)	2–0	Fleet Town (8)	394
106	Godalming Town (8)	1–1	Moneyfields (9)	178
replay	Moneyfields (9)	1–3	Godalming Town (8)	290
107	Chippenham Town (7)	3–0	Wells City (9)	273
Walkover for Wells City – Chippenham Town removed
108	Merthyr Town (9)	1–1	Cinderford Town (8)	309
replay	Cinderford Town (8)	2–0 (a.e.t.)	Merthyr Town (9)	157
109	Yate Town (8)	1–0	Larkhall Athletic (9)	140
110	Swindon Supermarine (7)	3–2	Cirencester Town (7)	183
111	Hallen (9)	2–2	Frome Town (7)	91
replay	Frome Town (7)	1–1 (4–2 p)	Hallen (9)	192
112	Clevedon Town (8)	3–2	Brislington (9)	127
113	Bishop Sutton (9)	0–4	Cadbury Heath (10)	84
114	Bideford (8)	2–1	Bridgwater Town (8)	262
115	Weymouth (7)	0–0	Taunton Town (8)	367
replay	Taunton Town (8)	1–3	Weymouth (7)	270
116	Tavistock (10)	1–3	Bodmin Town (10)	94

== Second qualifying round ==
The Second qualifying round fixtures were played on the weekend of 1 October 2011. A total of 160 clubs took part in this stage of the competition, including the 116 winners from the first qualifying round and 44 Level 6 clubs, from Conference North and Conference South, entering at this stage. Six clubs from Level 10 of English football, was the lowest-ranked team to qualify for this round of the competition.

Tie	Home team (tier)	Score	Away team (tier)	Att.
1	Northwich Victoria (7)	1–2	Nantwich Town (7)	542
2	Stalybridge Celtic (6)	1–2	Guiseley (6)	462
3	Workington (6)	1–2	Droylsden (6)	316
4	FC Halifax Town (6)	2–1	Tadcaster Albion (9)	1,002
5	Wakefield (8)	1–4	Kendal Town (7)	98
6	Stocksbridge Park Steels (7)	3–1	Colwyn Bay (6)	128
7	Clitheroe (8)	1–3	Radcliffe Borough (8)	203
8	Staveley Miners Welfare (9)	0–3	Hyde (6)	320
9	Blyth Spartans (6)	2–1	Bedlington Terriers (9)	835
10	Ashton United (7)	0–3	Spennymoor Town (9)	324
11	AFC Fylde (8)	2–2	Gainsborough Trinity (6)	282
replay	Gainsborough Trinity (6)	2–1 (a.e.t.)	AFC Fylde (8)	525
12	Hebburn Town (10)	1–0	Runcorn Linnets (9)	170
13	F.C. United of Manchester (7)	0–1	Lancaster City (8)	1,147
14	Bradford Park Avenue (7)	3–1	Warrington Town (8)	268
15	Whitby Town (7)	2–1	North Ferriby United (7)	253
16	Frickley Athletic (7)	1–1	Harrogate Town (6)	285
replay	Harrogate Town (6)	'1–2	Frickley Athletic (7)	274
17	Altrincham (6)	0–2	Witton Albion (8)	628
18	Ashington (9)	3–3	Vauxhall Motors (6)	444
replay	Vauxhall Motors (6)	0–1	Ashington (9)	221
19	Histon (6)	1–1	Corby Town (6)	427
replay	Corby Town (6)	3–1	Histon (6)	642
20	Mickleover Sports (7)	1–4	Barrow Town (10)	230
21	Stafford Rangers (7)	2–4	Stratford Town (9)	438
22	Deeping Rangers (9)	0–2	Leek Town (8)	225
23	Buxton (7)	1–2	Rushall Olympic (7)	238
24	Matlock Town (7)	1–3	Hinckley United (6)	411
25	Eastwood Town (6)	0–3	Evesham United (7)	222
26	Barwell (7)	0–2	Stourbridge (7)	236
27	Chasetown (7)	1–2	Grantham Town (8)	326
28	Bridgnorth Town (9)	0–2	Long Buckby (9)	201
29	Carlton Town (8)	0–1	Hednesford Town (7)	201
30	Daventry Town (8)	2–1	Leamington (7)	551
31	Needham Market (8)	0–3	Nuneaton Town (6)	319
32	Solihull Moors (6)	2–0	Loughborough Dynamo (8)	152
33	Boston United (6)	0–0	Kidsgrove Athletic (8)	817
replay	Kidsgrove Athletic (8)	2–0	Boston United (6)	280
34	King's Lynn Town (9)	4–2	Quorn (8)	812
35	Chipstead (8)	0–3	Billericay Town (7)	175
36	Oxhey Jets (9)	1–2	Hendon (7)	376
37	Hanworth Villa (9)	1–0	Aveley (7)	196
38	Cray Wanderers (7)	5–0	Erith Town (9)	183
39	Arlesey Town (7)	6–2	Hampton & Richmond Borough (6)	156
40	Redbridge (8)	1–0	Bury Town (7)	120
41	Slough Town (8)	3–2	Boreham Wood (6)	277
42	East Thurrock United (7)	3–3	St Albans City (7)	181
replay	St Albans City (7)	1–3	East Thurrock United (7)	250
43	Southend Manor (9)	4–2	Chertsey Town (8)	168
44	Dover Athletic (6)	3–0	Carshalton Athletic (7)	639

Tie	Home team (tier)	Score	Away team (tier)	Att.
45	North Greenford United (8)	2–1	Hythe Town (8)	107
46	Chelmsford City (6)	3–0	Tonbridge Angels (6)	653
47	Sutton United (6)	5–1	Dulwich Hamlet (8)	494
48	Wroxham (9)	2–2	Concord Rangers (7)	140
replay	Concord Rangers (7)	1–2	Wroxham (9)	111
49	Dartford (6)	5–0	Harrow Borough (7)	803
50	Margate (7)	0–0	Thamesmead Town (8)	267
replay	Thamesmead Town (8)	1–6	Margate (7)	141
51	Bromley (6)	2–1	Welling United (6)	716
52	Leighton Town (8)	3–0	Hatfield Town (9)	213
53	Whitehawk (8)	0–0	Maldon & Tiptree (8)	104
replay	Maldon & Tiptree (8)	2–1	Whitehawk (8)	92
54	Staines Town (6)	0–0	Beaconsfield SYCOB (8)	213
replay	Beaconsfield SYCOB (8)	0–2	Staines Town (6)	175
55	Burnham (8)	2–2	Horsham (7)	130
replay	Horsham (7)	2–3	Burnham (8)	202
56	Dunstable Town (9)	2–1	Chesham United (7)	229
57	Biggleswade Town (8)	1–1	Leatherhead (7)	242
replay	Leatherhead (7)	2–1	Biggleswade Town (8)	240
58	Canvey Island (7)	0–1	Bishop's Stortford (6)	316
59	Waltham Forest (8)	0–3	Eastbourne Borough (6)	175
60	Maidstone United (8)	2–3	Bognor Regis Town (8)	386
61	Merstham (8)	0–2	AFC Sudbury (8)	123
62	Lowestoft Town (7)	3–0	Hemel Hempstead Town (7)	669
63	VCD Athletic (9)	2–2	Thurrock (6)	104
replay	Thurrock (6)	1–0	VCD Athletic (9)	87
64	Worthing (8)	0–0	Beckenham Town (9)	349
replay	Beckenham Town (9)	1–2	Worthing (8)	274
65	Havant & Waterlooville (6)	4–1	Sholing (8)	370
66	Frome Town (7)	0–0	Basingstoke Town (6)	300
replay	Basingstoke Town (6)	3–0	Frome Town (7)	262
67	Thame United (9)	1–3	Oxford City (7)	462
68	Bournemouth (9)	0–0	Truro City (6)	238
replay	Truro City (6)	3–2	Bournemouth (9)	182
69	Dorchester Town (6)	0–1	Weston-super-Mare (6)	329
70	Whitchurch United (10)	0–2	Gloucester City (6)	400
71	Wells City (9)	0–7	Woking (6)	410
72	Salisbury City (6)	3–0	Swindon Supermarine (7)	598
73	Yate Town (8)	1–1	Bodmin Town (10)	154
replay	Bodmin Town (10)	4–1	Yate Town (8)	300
74	Godalming Town (8)	2–1	Worcester City (6)	334
75	Poole Town (8)	4–0	Cadbury Heath (10)	382
76	Eastleigh (6)	3–1	Cinderford Town (8)	225
77	Weymouth (7)	3–3	Hungerford Town (8)	404
replay	Hungerford Town (8)	1–3	Weymouth (7)	214
78	Hartley Wintney (10)	2–1	Bideford (8)	210
79	Maidenhead United (6)	1–1	Farnborough (6)	352
replay	Farnborough (6)	2–3	Maidenhead United (6)	395
80	Clevedon Town (8)	1–2	AFC Totton (7)	140

== Third qualifying round ==
The Third qualifying round took place on the weekend of 15 October 2011. A total of 80 clubs took part, all having progressed from the second qualifying round. Four clubs from Level 10 of English football were the lowest-ranked teams to qualify for this round of the competition.

Tie	Home team (tier)	Score	Away team (tier)	Att.
1	Nantwich Town (7)	2–1	Kendal Town (7)	468
2	Radcliffe Borough (8)	2–4	Hebburn Town (10)	215
3	Lancaster City (8)	0–3	FC Halifax Town (6)	646
4	Whitby Town (7)	1–2	Blyth Spartans (6)	506
5	Gainsborough Trinity (6)	2–0	Frickley Athletic (7)	644
6	Hyde (6)	0–1	Bradford Park Avenue (7)	560
7	Ashington (9)	1–0	Guiseley (6)	730
8	Witton Albion (8)	3–1	Spennymoor Town (9)	512
9	Droylsden (6)	4–1	Stocksbridge Park Steels (7)	230
10	King's Lynn Town (9)	3–2	Stratford Town (9)	866
11	Daventry Town (8)	1–2	Nuneaton Town (6)	605
12	Hednesford Town (7)	2–4	Corby Town (6)	602
13	Kidsgrove Athletic (8)	2–1	Long Buckby (9)	343
14	Hinckley United (6)	3–3	Leek Town (8)	436
replay	Leek Town (8)	1–2	Hinckley United (6)	488
15	Solihull Moors (6)	3–2	Grantham Town (8)	308
16	Barrow Town (10)	0–3	Rushall Olympic (7)	318
17	Stourbridge (7)	5–0	Evesham United (7)	518
18	Billericay Town (7)	0–3	Leatherhead (7)	384
19	Worthing (8)	0–2	Staines Town (6)	466
20	Redbridge (8)	3–0	Dunstable Town (9)	114
21	Eastbourne Borough (6)	1–0	AFC Sudbury (8)	529

Tie	Home team (tier)	Score	Away team (tier)	Att.
22	Lowestoft Town (7)	2–5	Chelmsford City (6)	1,065
23	Cray Wanderers (7)	1–2	Dartford (6)	690
24	Maldon & Tiptree (8)	1–3	Hendon (7)	159
25	Thurrock (6)	0–0	Arlesey Town (7)	73
replay	Arlesey Town (7)	4–1	Thurrock (6)	136
26	Burnham (8)	2–5	Bishop's Stortford (6)	182
27	Slough Town (8)	2–2	Hanworth Villa (9)	525
replay	Hanworth Villa (9)	3–1	Slough Town (8)	592
28	East Thurrock United (7)	3–3	North Greenford United (8)	123
replay	North Greenford United (8)	0–3	East Thurrock United (7)	102
29	Dover Athletic (6)	3–1	Wroxham (9)	628
30	Margate (7)	2–3	Bromley (6)	515
31	Southend Manor (9)	5–0	Leighton Town (8)	309
32	Sutton United (6)	4–0	Bognor Regis Town (8)	622
33	Basingstoke Town (6)	4–0	Hartley Wintney (10)	577
34	Bodmin Town (10)	1–1	Godalming Town (8)	300
replay	Godalming Town (8)	5–1	Bodmin Town (10)	360
35	Gloucester City (6)	7–2	Truro City (6)	385
36	AFC Totton (7)	4–2	Weymouth (7)	712
37	Eastleigh (6)	1–3	Oxford City (7)	325
38	Salisbury City (6)	6–1	Poole Town (8)	961
39	Weston-super-Mare (6)	3–2	Havant & Waterlooville (6)	333
40	Maidenhead United (6)	4–1	Woking (6)	625

== Fourth qualifying round ==
The Fourth qualifying round took place on the weekend of 29 October 2011. A total of 64 clubs took part, 40 having progressed from the third qualifying round and 24 clubs from Conference Premier, forming Level 5 of English football, entering at this stage. The lowest-ranked side to qualify for this round was Level 10 club Hebburn Town.

Tie	Home team (tier)	Score	Away team (tier)	Att.
1	Tamworth (5)	2–1	King's Lynn Town (9)	966
2	Droylsden (6)	0–0	Blyth Spartans (6)	393
replay	Blyth Spartans (6)	2–1	Droylsden (6)	679
3	Stourbridge (7)	5–0	Rushall Olympic (7)	720
4	Kidsgrove Athletic (8)	0–2	Bradford Park Avenue (7)	1,140
5	Gateshead (5)	3–0	Hebburn Town (10)	1,198
6	Grimsby Town (5)	5–0	Ashington (9)	1,540
7	Wrexham (5)	2–1	York City (5)	2,252
8	Mansfield Town (5)	1–1	Fleetwood Town (5)	1,725
replay	Fleetwood Town (5)	5–0	Mansfield Town (5)	1,162
9	Nantwich Town (7)	1–0	Nuneaton Town (6)	1,011
10	Alfreton Town (5)	1–1	Lincoln City (5)	1,000
replay	Lincoln City (5)	1–2	Alfreton Town (5)	1,728
11	AFC Telford United (5)	5–0	Gainsborough Trinity (6)	1,075
12	Southport (5)	1–0	Stockport County (5)	1,358
13	Solihull Moors (6)	0–1	FC Halifax Town (6)	551
14	Kidderminster Harriers (5)	0–0	Corby Town (6)	1,281
replay	Corby Town (6)	4–1	Kidderminster Harriers (5)	1,026
15	Darlington (5)	1–1	Hinckley United (6)	1,175
replay	Hinckley United (6)	3–0	Darlington (5)	837

Tie	Home team (tier)	Score	Away team (tier)	Att.
16	Witton Albion (8)	1–4	Barrow (5)	860
17	Dover Athletic (6)	0–1	Bath City (5)	922
18	Bishop's Stortford (6)	1–2	Salisbury City (6)	501
19	Eastbourne Borough (6)	1–2	East Thurrock United (7)	603
20	Chelmsford City (6)	1–1	Gloucester City (6)	928
replay	Gloucester City (6)	0–1	Chelmsford City (6)	490
21	Hayes & Yeading United (5)	2–6	Cambridge United (5)	452
22	Godalming Town (8)	0–5	Maidenhead United (6)	703
23	Sutton United (6)	3–3	Leatherhead (7)	882
replay	Leatherhead (7)	2–3 (a.e.t.)	Sutton United (6)	940
24	Weston-super-Mare (6)	2–3	Oxford City (7)	630
25	AFC Totton (7)	3–2	Hanworth Villa (9)	764
26	Basingstoke Town (6)	2–1	Staines Town (6)	545
27	Arlesey Town (7)	2–1	Forest Green Rovers (5)	343
28	Dartford (6)	1–2	Bromley (6)	1,567
29	Luton Town (5)	5–1	Hendon (7)	2,329
30	Kettering Town (5)	3–1	Southend Manor (9)	987
31	Redbridge (8)	2–0	Ebbsfleet United (5)	442
32	Newport County (5)	4–3	Braintree Town (5)	1,234

== Competition proper ==
Winners from the fourth qualifying round advance to first round Proper, where clubs from Level 3 and Level 4 of English football, operating in The Football League, first enter the competition. See 2011–12 FA Cup for a report of First round proper onwards.
