= 2003–04 United Counties League =

The 2003–04 United Counties League season was the 97th in the history of the United Counties League, a football competition in England.

== Premier Division ==
United Counties League Premier Division
- Season: 2003–04
- Champions: Spalding United
- Promoted: Spalding United
- Matches: 462
- Goals: 1,492 (3.23 per match)

The Premier Division featured 20 clubs which competed in the division last season, along with two new clubs:

- Harrowby United, promoted from Division One
- Spalding United, relegated from the Southern Football League

=== League table ===
Pos	Team	Pld	W	D	L	GF	GA	GD	Pts	Promotion or relegation
1	Spalding United	42	28	6	8	97	44	+53	90	Promoted to the Northern Premier League Division One
2	Buckingham Town	42	25	10	7	102	46	+56	85	
3	Harrowby United	42	24	9	9	85	56	+29	81	
4	St. Neots Town	42	24	8	10	85	44	+41	80	
5	Boston Town	42	24	7	11	67	43	+24	79	
6	Cogenhoe United	42	23	9	10	86	38	+48	78	
7	Holbeach United	42	23	5	14	80	59	+21	74	
8	Yaxley	42	22	4	16	99	64	+35	70	
9	Ford Sports Daventry	42	19	11	12	83	56	+27	68	
10	Stotfold	42	19	8	15	73	59	+14	65	
11	Blackstones	42	16	10	16	57	62	−5	58	
12	Woodford United	42	14	13	15	61	53	+8	55	
13	Newport Pagnell Town	42	15	9	18	60	72	−12	54	
14	Wootton Blue Cross	42	14	10	18	59	61	−2	52	Club Folded
15	Bourne Town	42	12	11	19	54	90	−36	47	
16	Desborough Town	42	13	7	22	56	88	−32	46	
17	Deeping Rangers	42	12	9	21	48	78	−30	45	
18	Northampton Spencer	42	11	10	21	47	75	−28	43	
19	Stewarts & Lloyds Corby	42	11	7	24	52	81	−29	40	
20	Raunds Town	42	7	12	23	55	94	−39	33	
21	Long Buckby	42	8	4	30	46	134	−88	28	
22	Daventry Town	42	5	7	30	40	95	−55	22	

Source: fchd
Rules for classification: 1) points; 2) goal difference; 3) number of goals scored.

== Division One ==
United Counties League Division One
- Season: 2003–04
- Champions: Potton United
- Promoted: Potton United
- Matches: 306
- Goals: 1,117 (3.65 per match)

Division One featured 15 clubs which competed in the division last season, along with three new clubs:

- Kempston Rovers, relegated from the Premier Division
- Eye United, joined from the Peterborough and District League
- Huntingdon Town, joined from the Cambridgeshire League

=== League table ===
Pos	Team	Pld	W	D	L	GF	GA	GD	Pts	Promotion
1	Potton United	34	25	5	4	99	25	+74	80	Promoted to the Premier Division
2	Cottingham	34	23	7	4	80	31	+49	76	
3	Eye United	34	23	5	6	93	33	+60	74	
4	Thrapston Town	34	20	10	4	86	30	+56	70	
5	Eynesbury Rovers	34	19	10	5	87	40	+47	67	
6	Northampton Sileby Rangers	34	17	10	7	78	62	+16	61	
7	Wellingborough Whitworth	34	16	4	14	57	52	+5	52	
8	Northampton ON Chenecks	34	15	5	14	72	82	−10	50	
9	Blisworth	34	11	12	11	56	59	−3	45	
10	St Ives Town	34	11	10	13	52	58	−6	43	
11	Olney Town	34	11	6	17	52	69	−17	39	
12	Rothwell Corinthians	34	10	5	19	45	74	−29	35	
13	Bugbrooke St Michaels	34	9	5	20	46	71	−25	32	
14	Irchester United	34	8	5	21	46	76	−30	29	
15	Higham Town	34	6	9	19	52	93	−41	27	
16	Kempston Rovers	34	5	11	18	48	87	−39	26	
17	Huntingdon Town	34	5	10	19	36	66	−30	25	
18	Burton Park Wanderers	34	6	3	25	32	109	−77	21	

Source: fchd
Rules for classification: 1) points; 2) goal difference; 3) number of goals scored.
