= 2004–05 United Counties League =

The 2004–05 United Counties League season was the 98th in the history of the United Counties League, a football competition in England.

== Premier Division ==
United Counties League Premier Division
- Season: 2004–05
- Champions: Cogenhoe United
- Relegated: Daventry Town
- Matches: 462
- Goals: 1,510 (3.27 per match)

The Premier Division featured 21 clubs which competed in the division last season, along with one new club:

- Potton United, promoted from Division One

=== League table ===
Pos	Team	Pld	W	D	L	GF	GA	GD	Pts	Promotion or relegation
1	Cogenhoe United	42	30	7	5	108	36	+72	97	
2	Potton United	42	30	5	7	111	42	+69	95	
3	Holbeach United	42	26	4	12	84	51	+33	82	
4	Yaxley	42	23	11	8	89	51	+38	80	
5	Harrowby United	42	21	9	12	83	60	+23	72	
6	Ford Sports Daventry	42	21	5	16	72	53	+19	68	
7	Woodford United	42	17	12	13	66	49	+17	63	
8	Long Buckby	42	19	6	17	76	83	−7	63	
9	Stotfold	42	17	9	16	69	61	+8	60	
10	Desborough Town	42	16	11	15	60	69	−9	59	
11	Boston Town	42	14	15	13	72	65	+7	57	
12	Deeping Rangers	42	16	9	17	66	72	−6	57	
13	Buckingham Town	42	15	9	18	64	64	0	54	
14	St. Neots Town	42	14	11	17	67	78	−11	53	
15	Blackstones	42	13	8	21	46	68	−22	47	
16	Northampton Spencer	42	13	6	23	65	87	−22	45	
17	Wootton Blue Cross	42	11	12	19	56	81	−25	45	
18	Newport Pagnell Town	42	10	13	19	55	75	−20	43	
19	Bourne Town	42	10	12	20	54	88	−34	42	
20	Raunds Town	42	10	8	24	41	80	−39	38	
21	Stewarts & Lloyds Corby	42	10	5	27	44	86	−42	35	
22	Daventry Town	42	9	7	26	62	111	−49	34	Relegated to Division One

Source: fchd
Rules for classification: 1) points; 2) goal difference; 3) number of goals scored.

== Division One ==
United Counties League Division One
- Season: 2004–05
- Champions: Northampton Sileby Rangers
- Promoted: St Ives Town
- Matches: 306
- Goals: 1,069 (3.49 per match)

Division One featured 17 clubs which competed in the division last season, along with one new club:

- Sleaford Town, joined from the Lincolnshire League

Also, Cottingham changed name to Corby Cottingham.

=== League table ===
Pos	Team	Pld	W	D	L	GF	GA	GD	Pts	Promotion
1	Northampton Sileby Rangers	34	22	5	7	95	44	+51	71	
2	Wellingborough Whitworth	34	21	8	5	70	32	+38	71	
3	St Ives Town	34	21	5	8	76	46	+30	68	Promoted to the Premier Division
4	Eye United	34	20	5	9	83	44	+39	65	
5	Blisworth	34	19	7	8	58	46	+12	64	
6	Sleaford Town	34	17	8	9	78	48	+30	59	
7	Corby Cottingham	34	14	11	9	57	40	+17	53	Club folded
8	Rothwell Corinthians	34	16	3	15	69	56	+13	51	
9	Irchester United	34	15	4	15	52	49	+3	49	
10	Higham Town	34	14	4	16	61	75	−14	46	
11	Eynesbury Rovers	34	12	8	14	76	66	+10	44	
12	Bugbrooke St Michaels	34	12	8	14	50	59	−9	44	
13	Thrapston Town	34	12	7	15	59	64	−5	43	
14	Huntingdon Town	34	12	7	15	49	54	−5	43	
15	Northampton ON Chenecks	34	9	7	18	46	67	−21	34	
16	Kempston Rovers	34	9	5	20	41	81	−40	32	
17	Olney Town	34	4	6	24	31	78	−47	18	
18	Burton Park Wanderers	34	1	4	29	18	120	−102	7	

Source: fchd
Rules for classification: 1) points; 2) goal difference; 3) number of goals scored.
