= 2001–02 United Counties League =

The 2001–02 United Counties League season was the 95th in the history of the United Counties League, a football competition in England.

== Premier Division ==
United Counties League Premier Division
- Season: 2001–02
- Champions: Ford Sports Daventry
- Relegated: Bugbrooke St Michaels
- Matches: 420
- Goals: 1,450 (3.45 per match)

The Premier Division featured 19 clubs which competed in the division last season, along with two new clubs, promoted from Division One:

- Daventry Town
- Deeping Rangers

=== League table ===
Pos	Team	Pld	W	D	L	GF	GA	GD	Pts	Promotion or relegation
1	Ford Sports Daventry	40	31	6	3	95	30	+65	99	
2	Holbeach United	40	25	5	10	110	52	+58	80	
3	Cogenhoe United	40	24	8	8	83	57	+26	80	
4	Raunds Town	40	21	11	8	95	54	+41	74	
5	Desborough Town	40	22	8	10	85	48	+37	74	
6	St. Neots Town	40	23	4	13	80	47	+33	73	
7	Wootton Blue Cross	40	21	9	10	74	50	+24	72	
8	Boston Town	40	20	8	12	93	50	+43	68	
9	Stotfold	40	20	8	12	75	48	+27	68	
10	Deeping Rangers	40	20	6	14	79	56	+23	66	
11	Yaxley	40	16	11	13	73	57	+16	59	
12	Blackstones	40	16	5	19	57	68	−11	53	
13	Bourne Town	40	15	8	17	57	75	−18	53	
14	Stewarts & Lloyds Corby	40	14	7	19	61	72	−11	49	
15	Daventry Town	40	13	7	20	59	71	−12	46	
16	Buckingham Town	40	13	7	20	78	91	−13	46	
17	Northampton Spencer	40	12	4	24	52	63	−11	40	
18	Long Buckby	40	8	6	26	43	93	−50	30	
19	Kempston Rovers	40	8	3	29	45	101	−56	27	
20	Bugbrooke St Michaels	40	6	6	28	27	110	−83	24	Relegated to Division One
21	Wellingborough Town	40	3	1	36	29	157	−128	10	Club folded

Source: fchd
Rules for classification: 1) points; 2) goal difference; 3) number of goals scored.

== Division One ==
United Counties League Division One
- Season: 2001–02
- Champions: Newport Pagnell Town
- Promoted: Newport Pagnell Town; Woodford United
- Matches: 272
- Goals: 1,003 (3.69 per match)

Division One featured 15 clubs which competed in the division last season, along with two new clubs, relegated from the Premier Division:

- Eynesbury Rovers
- Potton United

=== League table ===
Pos	Team	Pld	W	D	L	GF	GA	GD	Pts	Promotion
1	Newport Pagnell Town	32	25	3	4	115	36	+79	78	Promoted to the Premier Division
2	Northampton Sileby Rangers	32	20	8	4	90	26	+64	68	
3	Woodford United	32	18	5	9	61	39	+22	59	Promoted to the Premier Division
4	Wellingborough Whitworth	32	16	10	6	57	46	+11	58	
5	Thrapston Town	32	16	8	8	77	52	+25	56	
6	Higham Town	32	16	8	8	66	44	+22	56	
7	Blisworth	32	15	8	9	50	31	+19	53	
8	Harrowby United	32	16	5	11	65	59	+6	53	
9	Irchester United	32	14	8	10	58	61	−3	50	
10	Olney Town	32	14	7	11	52	44	+8	49	
11	Cottingham	32	10	9	13	57	77	−20	39	
12	Northampton ON Chenecks	32	9	8	15	60	76	−16	35	
13	Eynesbury Rovers	32	9	6	17	43	59	−16	33	
14	Rothwell Corinthians	32	6	11	15	46	54	−8	29	
15	Potton United	32	5	3	24	38	107	−69	18	
16	St Ives Town	32	2	6	24	35	99	−64	12	
17	Burton Park Wanderers	32	2	5	25	33	93	−60	11	

Source: fchd
Rules for classification: 1) points; 2) goal difference; 3) number of goals scored.
