= 2002–03 United Counties League =

The 2002–03 United Counties League season was the 96th in the history of the United Counties League, a football competition in England.

== Premier Division ==
United Counties League Premier Division
- Season: 2002–03
- Champions: Holbeach United
- Relegated: Kempston Rovers
- Matches: 420
- Goals: 1,334 (3.18 per match)

The Premier Division featured 19 clubs which competed in the division last season, along with two new clubs, promoted from Division One:

- Newport Pagnell Town
- Woodford United

=== League table ===
Pos	Team	Pld	W	D	L	GF	GA	GD	Pts	Promotion or relegation
1	Holbeach United	40	28	8	4	80	25	+55	92	
2	Newport Pagnell Town	40	27	5	8	118	43	+75	86	
3	Wootton Blue Cross	40	22	10	8	72	32	+40	76	
4	Buckingham Town	40	21	8	11	90	50	+40	71	
5	Deeping Rangers	40	20	9	11	68	58	+10	69	
6	Stewarts & Lloyds Corby	40	21	5	14	72	56	+16	68	
7	Yaxley	40	20	7	13	72	52	+20	67	
8	Boston Town	40	20	5	15	62	55	+7	65	
9	Cogenhoe United	40	18	7	15	75	59	+16	61	
10	Daventry Town	40	15	11	14	55	66	−11	56	
11	Ford Sports Daventry	40	13	14	13	62	67	−5	53	
12	Northampton Spencer	40	15	7	18	52	60	−8	52	
13	St. Neots Town	40	16	4	20	59	69	−10	52	
14	Woodford United	40	15	7	18	50	60	−10	52	
15	Raunds Town	40	15	6	19	52	58	−6	51	
16	Blackstones	40	13	9	18	72	74	−2	48	
17	Stotfold	40	11	13	16	67	69	−2	46	
18	Desborough Town	40	10	13	17	48	75	−27	43	
19	Bourne Town	40	8	8	24	50	94	−44	32	
20	Long Buckby	40	3	10	27	21	107	−86	19	
21	Kempston Rovers	40	4	4	32	34	102	−68	16	Relegated to Division One

Source: fchd
Rules for classification: 1) points; 2) goal difference; 3) number of goals scored.

== Division One ==
United Counties League Division One
- Season: 2002–03
- Champions: Northampton Sileby Rangers
- Promoted: Harrowby United
- Matches: 240
- Goals: 876 (3.65 per match)

Division One featured 15 clubs which competed in the division last season, along with one new club:

- Bugbrooke St Michaels, relegated from the Premier Division

=== League table ===
Pos	Team	Pld	W	D	L	GF	GA	GD	Pts	Promotion
1	Northampton Sileby Rangers	30	23	3	4	96	26	+70	72	
2	Harrowby United	30	21	4	5	81	29	+52	67	Promoted to the Premier Division
3	Irchester United	30	20	4	6	63	36	+27	64	
4	Eynesbury Rovers	30	19	3	8	77	36	+41	60	
5	Thrapston Town	30	17	7	6	61	37	+24	58	
6	Potton United	30	16	6	8	63	40	+23	54	
7	Olney Town	30	14	7	9	65	43	+22	49	
8	Rothwell Corinthians	30	12	6	12	49	44	+5	42	
9	St Ives Town	30	11	9	10	47	50	−3	42	
10	Cottingham	30	11	6	13	49	46	+3	39	
11	Northampton ON Chenecks	30	9	7	14	54	74	−20	34	
12	Wellingborough Whitworth	30	8	2	20	39	72	−33	26	
13	Bugbrooke St Michaels	30	6	4	20	40	81	−41	22	
14	Higham Town	30	5	5	20	35	76	−41	20	
15	Blisworth	30	4	6	20	30	94	−64	18	
16	Burton Park Wanderers	30	2	5	23	27	92	−65	11	

Source: fchd
Rules for classification: 1) points; 2) goal difference; 3) number of goals scored.
