= Tiltman =

Tiltman might refer to:

- John Tiltman (John Hessell Tiltman) (1894-1982), one of the greatest British cryptanalysts during World War II
- John Hessell Tiltman (property manager) (born 1942), British architect
- A. H. Tiltman (Alfred Hessell Tiltman) (1891-1975), known as Hessell Tiltman, aircraft designer and co-founder of the British aeronautical company Airspeed Ltd
- H. Hessell Tiltman (Hugh Hessell Tiltman) (1897-1976), British writer and journalist
- Richard Tiltman (born 1960), English footballer
- Claire Tiltman (1971-1993), British schoolgirl who was the victim of a high-profile murder in Greenhithe, Kent

== Other ==
Hessell-Tiltman Prize
