= 2022 FA Vase final =

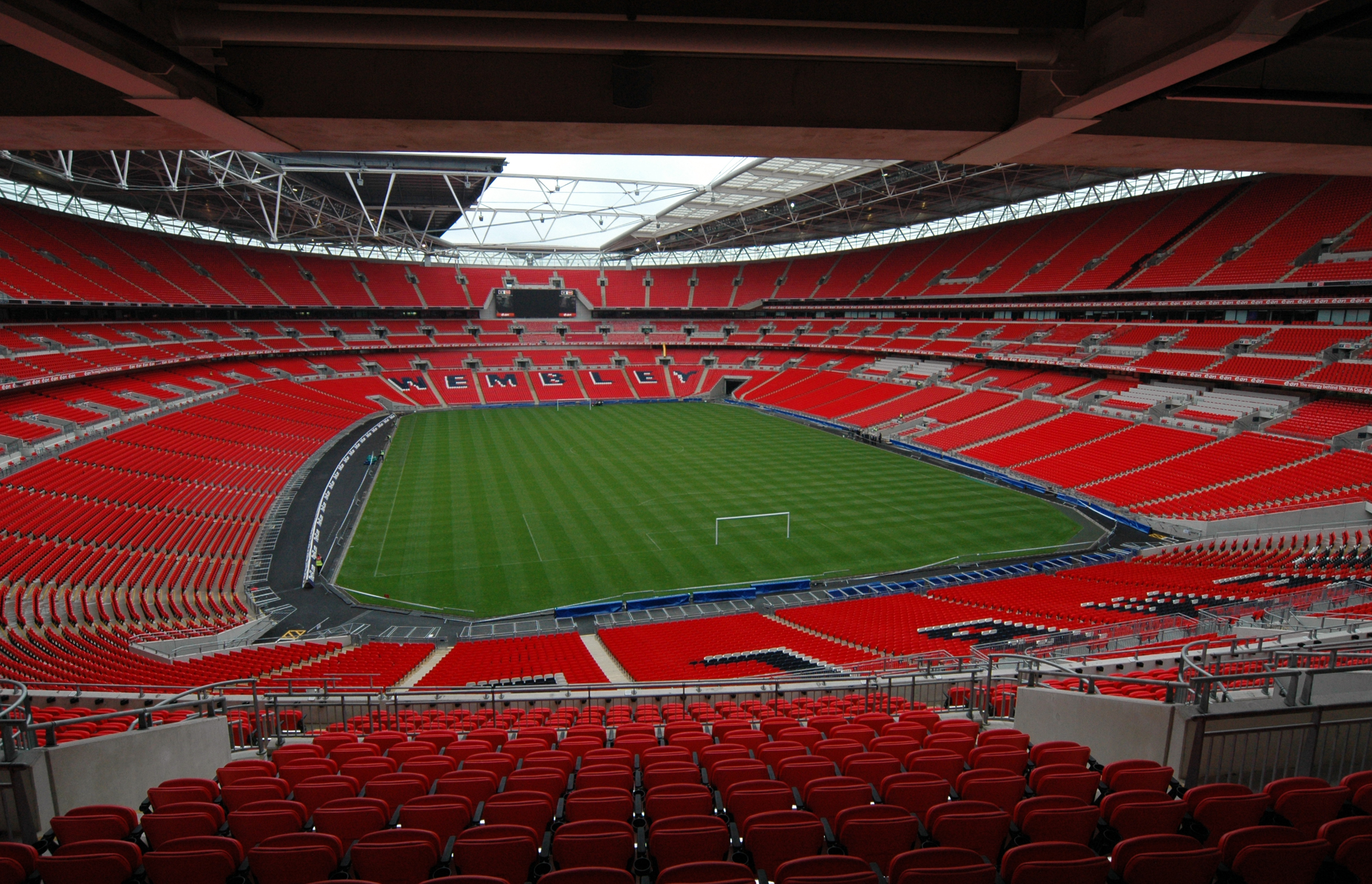
- Wembley Stadium hosted the final
- Event: 2021–22 FA Vase
Littlehampton Town	Newport Pagnell Town
0	3
- Date: 22 May 2022
- Venue: Wembley Stadium, London
- Referee: Samuel Barrott (West Riding FA)
- Attendance: 15,000
- Weather: sunny

The 2022 FA Vase final was the 48th final of the Football Association's cup competition for teams at levels 9–11 of the English football league system. The match was contested between Littlehampton Town of the Southern Combination Premier Division and Newport Pagnell Town of the United Counties League Premier Division South.

== Route to the Final ==
=== Littlehampton Town ===
23 October 2021 First Round	Littlehampton Town	3–2	Moneyfields	Littlehampton
15:00 BST				Stadium: The Sportsfield; Attendance: 202

20 November 2021 Second Round	Deal Town	1–2	Littlehampton Town	Deal
15:00 GMT				Stadium: The Charles Ground; Attendance: 407

11 December 2021 Third Round	Littlehampton Town	1–0	Sheppey United	Littlehampton
15:00 GMT				Stadium: The Sportsfield; Attendance: 275

15 January 2022 Fourth Round	Athletic Newham	5–0	Littlehampton Town	Plaistow
15:00 GMT		Report		Stadium: Terence McMillan Stadium; Attendance: 152
Note: Athletic Newham were removed from the competition for fielding an ineligible player

12 February 2022 Fifth Round	Littlehampton Town	3–3 (4–1 p)	Brockenhurst	Littlehampton
15:00 GMT				Stadium: The Sportsfield; Attendance: 1,276

12 March 2022 Quarter-Finals	Littlehampton Town	1–0	North Shields	Littlehampton
15:00 GMT				Stadium: The Sportsfield; Attendance: 2,245

2 April 2022 Semi-Finals	Littlehampton Town	4–0	Loughborough Students	Littlehampton
15:00 BST				Stadium: The Sportsfield; Attendance: 3,142

=== Newport Pagnell Town ===
25 September 2021 Second Qualifying Round	Newport Pagnell Town	1–0	Harpenden Town	Newport Pagnell
15:00 BST				Stadium: Willen Road; Attendance: 141

23 October 2021 First Round	London Colney	0–1	Newport Pagnell Town	London Colney
15:00 BST				Stadium: Cotlandswick Park; Attendance: 50

20 November 2021 Second Round	Newport Pagnell Town	1–1 (2–1 p)	Leighton Town	Newport Pagnell
15:00 GMT				Stadium: Willen Road; Attendance: 526

11 December 2021 Third Round	Whittlesey Athletic	0–6	Newport Pagnell Town	Whittlesey
15:00 GMT				Stadium: Feldale Field; Attendance: 359

15 January 2022 Fourth Round	Newport Pagnell Town	3–1	Fakenham Town	Newport Pagnell
15:00 GMT				Stadium: Willen Road; Attendance: 616

12 February 2022 Fifth Round	Newport Pagnell Town	1–1 (4–3 p)	Buckland Athletic	Newport Pagnell
15:00 GMT				Stadium: Willen Road; Attendance: 1,186

12 March 2022 Quarter-Finals	Whitchurch Alport	1–2	Newport Pagnell Town	Whitchurch
15:00 GMT				Stadium: Yockings Park; Attendance: 1,200

2 April 2022 Semi-Finals	Newport Pagnell Town	1–1 (5–4 p)	Hamworthy United	Newport Pagnell
15:00 BST				Stadium: Willen Road; Attendance: 1,800

== Match ==
=== Details ===
22 May 2022
12:15 BST

Littlehampton Town	0–3	Newport Pagnell Town
	Report	Barnes 19'; Shepherd 55', 63'

Wembley Stadium, London
Referee: Samuel Barrott (West Riding FA)

GK	1	James Binfield
DF	2	Shay Wiggans
DF	5	Jordan Clark (c)
DF	6	Jordan Layton	(substituted off) 57'
DF	20	Lewis Jenkins
MF	7	Lucas Pattenden
MF	8	Tom Biggs
MF	11	Dion Jarvis
MF	12	Liam Humphreys	(substituted off) 57'
FW	9	Joe Benn
FW	10	George Gaskin	(substituted off) 45'
Substitutes
DF	3	Alex Duncan
DF	19	Ryan Peake
DF	21	Scott Packer
MF	17	Lee Garnham
MF		Dave Herbert	(substituted on) 57'
FW		Aaron Capon	(substituted on) 45'
FW		Zac Harris	(substituted on) 57'

GK	1	Martin Conway
DF	3	James Sage
DF	5	Jordan Wright (c)	(substituted off) 73'
DF	6	Alfie Powell
DF	21	Lewis Markey
MF	4	Christian Smail
MF	7	Kieran Barnes	19' (substituted off) 68'
MF	8	Ben Shepherd	54', 63' (pen.)
MF	10	Jake Watkinson	(substituted off) 68'
FW	14	Danny Webb
FW	19	Mohamed Ahmed
Substitutes
DF	12	Robbie Goodman
MF	19	Michael Lyons
FW	15	Jake Newman
FW	17	Jake Stronge
DF		Adam Pryke	(substituted on) 73'
MF		Ben Ford	(substituted on) 68'
FW		Jim Burnside	(substituted on) 68'

Man of the match: Ben Shepherd Match officials

- Assistant referees:

Ravel Cheoisua
Conor Farrell

- Fourth official: Tom Reeves
