= Stephen Cooke =

English association football player

Personal information
- Full name: Stephen Lee Cooke
- Date of birth: 15 February 1983 (age 43)
- Place of birth: Walsall, England
- Height: 5 ft 8 in (1.73 m)
- Position: Midfielder

Youth career
- FA National School of Excellence
- Manchester United
- Walsall
- ?–2000: Aston Villa

Senior career*
Years	Team	Apps	(Gls)
2000–2005	Aston Villa	4	(0)
2002	→ AFC Bournemouth (loan)	7	(0)
2004	→ AFC Bournemouth (loan)	3	(0)
2004–2005	→ Wycombe Wanderers (loan)	6	(0)
2005–2007	AFC Bournemouth	40	(3)
2007	→ Torquay United (loan)	12	(1)
2007	Halesowen Town	4	(0)
2009	Weymouth	4	(0)
2009	Halesowen Town	5	(0)
2009–2010	Bloxwich United		
2010–????	Pelsall Villa	3	(0)
Total		88	(4)

International career
2002	England U20	1	(0)
- * Club domestic league appearances and goals

Stephen Lee Cooke (born 15 February 1983) is a retired professional footballer. Once considered a bright prospect for the future of English football, Cooke's career was seriously affected by a number of injuries.

== Playing career ==
=== Aston Villa ===
Cooke was born in Walsall and began his career as a trainee at the FA National School of Excellence in Lilleshall between 1997 and 1999. He then signed as a trainee at Manchester United. He then moved to Aston Villa. Cooke turned professional in July 2000. He made his first team debut on 2 August 2000, coming on as a second-half substitute for Julian Joachim in Villa's 2–1 defeat at home to Celta Vigo in the UEFA Intertoto Cup semi-final second-leg. Cooke was regularly training with the first team under manager John Gregory. During this time, he did various chores around Bodymoor Heath, including cleaning the boots of Dion Dublin.

According to Cooke's later recollections, the next Aston Villa manager, Graham Taylor, 'wasn't convinced' initially that the youngster was ready for the first team. Cooke moved to AFC Bournemouth on loan in March 2002, making his Football League debut in Bournemouth's 5–1 win at home to Northampton Town on 9 March. He returned to Villa before the end of the season.

On 1 January 2003, he made his Premier League debut for Aston Villa, coming as a late substitute for Ulises De la Cruz in Villa's 2–0 home win over Bolton Wanderers. He made two further appearances that season for Aston Villa, as a late substitute for Dion Dublin in the 1–0 defeat at home to Manchester United in March and as a second-half substitute for Stefan Moore in the 3–1 defeat away to Leeds United on the final day of the season.

Cooke later claimed that manager Graham Taylor saw him as a wide player, rather than his preferred central midfield position. During one team meeting in the 2002–03 season, Taylor singled out Cooke in a team meeting by saying 'how long am I going to have to wait for you to start doing what you need to do?' Taylor wanted Cooke to 'play wide but run the game', leaving Cooke confused about his role in the team. Taylor rewarded Cooke at the end of the season by offering him a new contract. Days later, Taylor left the club and was replaced by David O'Leary who did not select Cooke.

Cooke rejoined Bournemouth again on loan in January 2004. He signed on loan for Wycombe Wanderers in December of the same year. He severely injured his ankle while on loan which did not heal. Ankle cartilage problems continued to blight his career. Cooke later claimed that he considered retiring at this point in his career. Cooke's Aston Villa career came to an end when he was released at the end of the 2004–05 season.

=== AFC Bournemouth ===
In July 2005, Cooke re-signed for Bournemouth, this time on a permanent basis, opting against a move to his hometown club of Walsall. Cooke was still injured when he signed and was unsure if his fitness would ever return.

=== Torquay United ===
On 16 January 2007, Cooke joined Torquay United on loan until the end of the season. He made the good start to his Torquay United career scoring on his debut, but the club lost 5–2 away to Notts County on 19 January. He returned to Bournemouth and was released at the end of the season.

=== Halesowen Town ===
On 3 August 2007, Halesowen Town confirmed that Cooke had joined the club along with two other former League players, in the shape of Terry Fleming and Duane Darby.

In September 2007 he undertook a trial with Grimsby Town and later trialled with Wrexham. Cooke later claimed he had offers to play in the United States.

Both trials came to nothing and he resigned for Halesowen Town.

=== Weymouth ===
In April 2009, he signed for Weymouth until the end of the season, but only made four appearances. Cooke later claimed he was 'never keen on that level of football'.

=== Return to Halesowen ===
For 2009–10, Cooke returned to Halesowen Town where he joined up with former Aston Villa teammate Stefan Moore. However, the second spell was also unsuccessful for Cooke who was released on 17 September 2009 after the club entered administration.

=== Bloxwich United ===
Cooke signed for Bloxwich United in September 2009, following his release from Halesowen.

=== Pelsall Villa ===
Cooke's stay at Bloxwich United was not a long one, and he soon left to join Pelsall Villa. He played three games in the 2009–10 season, providing one assist.

== Coaching career ==
Cooke has served as a coach at Chasetown FC.
