= Bloxwich United A.F.C. =

Bloxwich United
- Full name: Bloxwich United Association Football Club
- Nickname(s): Red Lions
- Founded: 2006 (as Birchills United)
- Dissolved: 2012
- Ground: Old Red Lion Ground; Bloxwich
- 2011–12: Midland Combination; Premier Division, 7th
Home colours

Bloxwich United A.F.C. was a football club based in Bloxwich, England. Prior to 2008 the club was called Birchills United. In the 2007–08 season, they were champions of the West Midlands (Regional) League Division One. The club resigned midway through the 2012–13 season and folded.

== History ==
The club was formed by Michael Moseley, Steve Hinks, Jason Moseley and Ian Mason in 2006. Starting life as members of the Wolverhampton Combination, they won all 20 league games as well as the Baker Cup and Oakley Cup. Agreeing a deal to play at the Old Red Lion Ground in Bloxwich in the summer of 2007, they were accepted into the West Midlands (Regional) League.

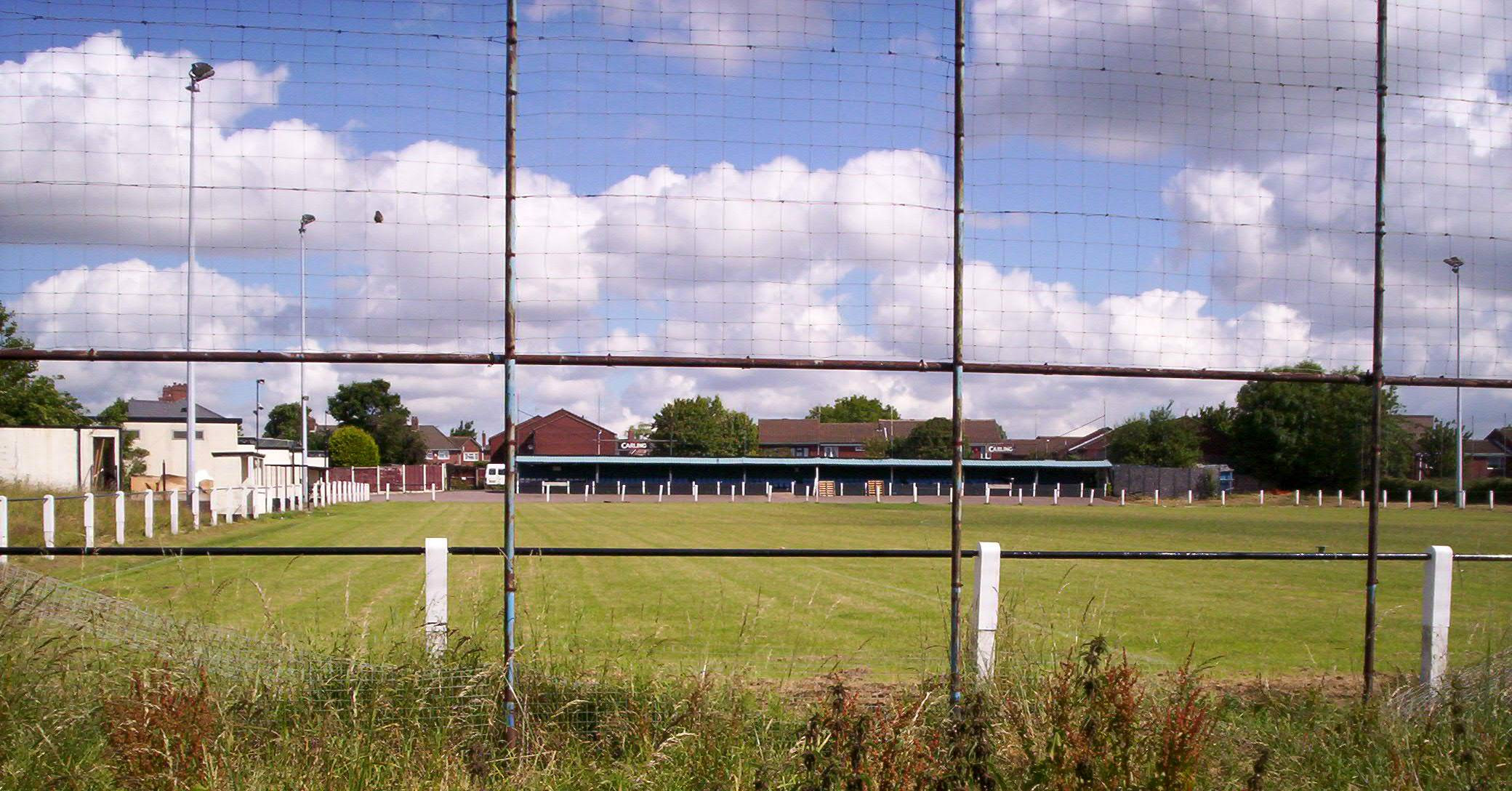
The club's home ground, the Old Red Lion Ground

They achieved a place in the First Division because of their facilities, the club spent the majority of the 2007–08 campaign at the top of the table and won the championship of the division. For the start of the 2008–09 season the club changed its name to Bloxwich United.

In 2009, former Aston Villa midfielder Stephen Cooke signed for the club.

== Honours ==
- West Midlands (Regional) League Premier Division
  - Runners-up 2008–09, 2009–10
- West Midlands (Regional) League Division One
  - Champions 2007–08

== Records ==
- FA Cup
  - Extra Preliminary Round 2011–12
- FA Vase
  - Fourth Round 2010–11
