= Richard Tiltman =

English footballer (born 1960)

Personal information
- Full name: Richard George Tiltman
- Date of birth: 14 December 1960 (age 65)
- Place of birth: Shoreham-by-Sea, England
- Height: 6 ft 0 in (1.83 m)
- Position: Forward

Senior career*
Years	Team	Apps	(Gls)
19??–1981	Montague Athletic (Worthing)		
1981–1984	Littlehampton Town		
1984–1985	Worthing		
1985–1987	Maidstone United	20	(3)
1986	→ Worthing (loan)		
1986	→ East Fremantle Tricolore (loan)		
1986	→ Crawley Town (loan)	1	(0)
1987–1988	Brighton & Hove Albion	13	(1)
1988–1989	Crawley Town	47	(7)
1989–1990	Bognor Regis Town		
1990–1991	Perth Italia		
1991–1995	Worthing		
1995	→ Shoreham (loan)		
1995–1996	Stamco		
1996–199?	Worthing		
- * Club domestic league appearances and goals

Richard George Tiltman (born 14 December 1960) is an English former professional footballer who played as a forward in the Football League for Brighton & Hove Albion. He also played for Maidstone United in the Alliance Premier League, for Southern League Premier Division club Crawley Town, and for a large number of Sussex-based clubs at lower levels, as well as for teams in Australia.

Tiltman was born in Shoreham-by-Sea, Sussex. Outside football, he ran a financial services business in Worthing.
