= Littlehampton Town F.C. =

Association football club in England

Coordinates: 50°48′29″N 0°31′48″W

Littlehampton Town
- Full name: Littlehampton Town Football Club
- Nicknames: The Marigolds, The Golds
- Founded: 1896 (as Littlehampton)
- Ground: The Sportsfield, Littlehampton
- Capacity: 4,000
- Chairman: Rob McAlees
- Manager: Mitchell Hand & George Gaskin
- League: Isthmian League South Central Division
- 2025–26: Isthmian League South Central Division, 19th of 22
| Home colours | Away colours |

Littlehampton Town Football Club is a football club based in Littlehampton, England. They were established in 1896 and joined the Sussex County League in 1928. In the 1990–91 season, they reached the 1st round of the FA Cup, and in the 2021–22 season they reached the FA Vase final at Wembley Stadium. They are currently members of the Isthmian League South Central Division (8th tier) and play at The Sportsfield.

== History ==
Littlehampton F.C. was formed in 1896, adding the Town suffix in 1938. The club became founding members of the West Sussex Football League in 1896, joining the Junior Division. In 1928 the club joined the Sussex County League. Despite finishing as runners-up in Division One on six occasions, they had to wait until 1990–91 before lifting the championship – the only time they have done so, having finished as runners-up to Wick the previous season – clinching the title on the last day of the season, at nearest rivals Peacehaven & Telscombe.

That season was undoubtedly the finest in the Marigolds’ history. As well as finishing as Division One champions, the club also reached the 1st Round of the FA Cup where they were beaten 4–0 by Northampton Town in front of a crowd of 4,000 at The Sportsfield. A League & Cup ‘double’ was completed with a 3–0 win over Burgess Hill Town. If that wasn't enough, Littlehampton also reached the semi-finals of the FA Vase, which was the furthest any Sussex club had reached in the competition until the Golds went one step further and reached the final in 2022.

The following season, Littlehampton finished third behind Peacehaven & Telscombe and Langney Sports (now Eastbourne Borough). However, fortunes declined to the extent that they were relegated at the end of the 1994–95 season.

Two seasons later Littlehampton returned to the top division as champions of Division Two, and finished runners-up to Division One champions Burgess Hill Town in 1997–98. Once more however, the club suffered a sustained period of mediocrity, culminating in a miserable 2002–03 season, including a 22–1 defeat at Horsham YMCA; and relegation once again, ironically with Wick and Peacehaven & Telscombe... together, the three most dominant clubs in the early 1990s.

The club responded by investing heavily in the playing squad for 2003–04 and began the season as hot favourites to bounce back at the first attempt. This they duly did, finishing seven points clear of runners-up Worthing United. The two clubs also met in the League Cup final, with the Marigolds again coming out on top. There was no significant difference in the average attendance from the previous wretched season.

The club were the favourites of many to secure successive championships, which was probably a little too ambitious. Nevertheless, they fnished in a creditable 4th place, a position they occupied once again at the end of 2005–06. Unfortunately, the club lost manager Carl Stabler and most of the previous season's squad during the close season (many to Wick) and from being amongst the championship favourites the previous season, were now hotly tipped as relegation fodder. This proved to be the case and the Marigolds were always struggling throughout 2006–07, under new manager Trevor Waller, with a largely young and inexperienced squad.

The 2012–13 season saw the club finish as champions of Division Two, gaining promotion to Division One.

Littlehampton won the 2014–15 Sussex County Football League, finishing 1st. They however were not promoted after not applying for the Isthmian League. Their Twitter account said that "we don't want to", although it is likely they couldn't because their ground would not pass the grading test for Step 4 teams. The 2021–22 season saw Littlehampton win the league and gain promotion to the Isthmian League for the first time in their history, in addition to reaching three cup finals, where they won the Peter Bentley Southern Combination Challenge Cup, lost 3–0 in the 2022 FA Vase Final to Newport Pagnell Town at Wembley Stadium, and finally won the Sussex RUR Cup. This success saw Littlehampton achieve a historic treble, in addition to becoming the 'first team in Sussex to reach an FA Vase final'. On Tuesday 24th September 2024, a film celebrating the clubs 'greatest season', was shown at The White Hart in Littlehampton. The film, titled 'We're the L.A. Boys Making All the Noise', was put together by fan Steve Darken and local historian Chris Hare using a grant from Historic England.

During their 2024–25 season, Littlehampton reached the final of the Sussex Senior Cup, for the first time since 1991. The final was at the Amex, and was against Isthmian League Premier Division team Horsham FC who won 1-0. The club were moved laterally to the Isthmian League South Central Division ahead of the 2025–26 season. Despite finishing the 2025–26 season in a relegation position, they received a reprieve due to their superior points-per-game record compared to the other relegation zone placed step 4 teams across the country.

== Ground ==
Littlehampton Town play their home games at The Sportsfield, St Floras Road, Littlehampton, West Sussex, BN17 6BD.

The ground formerly consisted of an old, predominantly wooden, main stand with two smaller covered terraces either side of it. The club passed plans for a modernised, 154-seater main stand in 2023, with construction taking place in May 2024 and completing in June 2024 after a successful crowd fund and a £100,000 grant from the Football Foundation Premier League Stadium Fund.

== Honours ==
- Southern Combination Premier Division
  - Winners (1): 2021–22
- Sussex County League Division One
  - Winners (1): 1990–91,
  - Runners Up (9): 1946–47, 1971–72, 1973–74, 1975–76, 1981–82, 1983–84, 1984–85, 1989–90, 1997–98
- Sussex County League Division Two
  - Winners (3): 1996–97, 2003–04, 2012–13

=== Cup honours ===
Sussex Senior Winners 1969/70

- The Sussex Royal Ulster Rifles Charity Cup
  - Winners (5): 1946–47, 1969–70, 1970–71, 1983–84, 2021–22
  - Runners Up (3): 1976–77, 1981–82, 1988–89
- Sussex County Football League John O'hara League Cup
  - Runners Up (1): 2012–13
- Sussex County Football League Division Two Cup
  - Runners Up (1): 2012–13
- Peter Bentley Southern Combination Challenge Cup
  - Winners (1): 2021–22
- Sussex Principle Royal Ulster Rifles (RUR) Charity Cup
  - Winners (1): 2021–22
- Sussex Senior Challenge Cup
  - Runners Up (1): 2024–25

== Records ==
- Highest League Position:
  - 1st in Sussex County League Division One: 1990–91, 2014–15, 2021–2022
- FA Cup Best Performance
  - First Round: 1990–91
- FA Trophy Best Performance
  - Third Qualifying Round: 2024–25
- FA Vase Best Performance
  - Runner-up: 2021–22
- Record attendance:
  - 3,142 vs Loughborough University, FA Vase semi final, 2 April 2022

== Notable former players ==
Players that have played/managed in the football league or any foreign equivalent to this level (i.e. fully professional league):

- Richard Tiltman - Brighton & Hove Albion 1986–1988

Players with full international caps:

- James Thornton - Australia 2003–2004

Players that hold a club record or have captained the club:

- Russell Bromage
