= Newport Pagnell Town F.C. =

English association football club

Coordinates: 52°04′37″N 0°43′16″W

Newport Pagnell Town
- Full name: Newport Pagnell Town Football Club
- Nickname: The Swans
- Founded: 1963
- Ground: Willen Road, Newport Pagnell
- Capacity: 2,000 (100 seated)
- Chairman: Ian Ford
- Manager: Gary Flinn
- League: Spartan South Midlands League Premier Division
- 2025–26: United Counties League Premier Division South, 9th of 20 (transferred)
- Website: nptfc.co.uk
| Home colours | Away colours |

Newport Pagnell Town Football Club is a football club based in Newport Pagnell, Buckinghamshire, England. They are currently members of the Spartan South Midlands League Premier Division and play at Willen Road.

== History ==
The club was established as Newport Pagnell Wanderers in 1963, following a meeting between a group of players and Town Clerk Frank Hall. They joined the North Bucks & District League in 1964 and won the Division Three Shield in their first season. After winning Division Three in 1965–66 and Division Two in 1966–67, the club were promoted to Division One. They went on to win the Division One title in each of the next three seasons, with the reserve team winning Division Two in 1968–69 and 1969–70. In 1971 the club moved up to Division One of the South Midlands League, before being renamed Newport Pagnell Town in 1972.

Newport Pagnell were Division One runners-up in 1972–73, after which they transferred to Division Two of the United Counties League. The club finished second in Division Two in 1975–76, earning promotion to Division One. After winning the Division One title in 1981–82, they were promoted to the Premier Division. The club finished bottom of the Premier Division in 1985–86 and was relegated back to Division One. They were Division One runners-up in 1991–92, earning promotion back to the Premier Division, but were relegated to Division One after finishing bottom of the Premier Division in 1996–97.

In 2001–02 Newport Pagnell were Division One champions and were promoted to the Premier Division, as well as winning the Berks & Bucks Intermediate Cup. They were Premier Division runners-up the following season. The club won the Berks & Bucks Senior Trophy in 2009–10 and retained it in 2010–11. At the end of the 2018–19 season they were transferred to the Premier Division of the Spartan South Midlands League. Two seasons later they were transferred back to the United Counties League, joining the Premier Division South. In 2021–22 the club won the FA Vase, defeating Littlehampton Town 3–0 in the final at Wembley Stadium. They reached the final again the following season but lost 1–0 to Ascot United.

== Ground ==
The club initially played on a pitch on Bury Field Common, using the Cannon pub on Union Street for changing rooms. When they moved up to the South Midlands League in 1971 the club played at the Youth Club in Wolverton Road, before relocating to the Willen Road Sports Ground in 1972. The new ground was opened with a match against Bletchley Town. Willen Road currently has a capacity of 2,000, of which 100 is seated and covered.

== Honours ==
- FA Vase
  - Winners 2021–22
- United Counties League
  - Division One champions 1981–82, 2001–02
  - Division One Knockout Cup winners 1977–78
- North Bucks & District League
  - Division One champions 1967–68, 1968–69, 1969–70
  - Division One Shield winners 1968–69
  - Division Two champions 1966–67
  - Division Two Shield winners 1966–67
  - Division Three champions 1965–66
  - Division Three Shield winners 1964–65
- Berks & Bucks FA Senior Trophy
  - Winners 2009–10, 2010–11
- Berks & Bucks FA Intermediate Cup
  - Winners 2001–02

== Club staff ==
=== Coaching staff ===
As of 16 August 2025

| Position | Name |
|---|---|
| Manager | (England) Gary Flinn |
| Assistant Manager | (England) Gary Chance |
| Physio | (England) Bianca Jackman |

=== Officials ===
| Position | Name |
|---|---|
| Chairman | (England) Ian Ford |
| Club secretary | (England) John Webb |
| Head of Women's Football | (England) James Badham |

== Records ==
- Best FA Cup performance: Second Qualifying Round, 2008–09
- Best FA Vase performance: Winners, 2021–22
- Record attendance: 1,858 vs Hamworthy United, FA Vase Semi Final, 2021-22

== See also ==
- Newport Pagnell Town F.C. players
