= Holbeach United F.C. =

Association football club in England

Coordinates: 52°48′24.71″N 0°00′58.60″E

Holbeach United
- Full name: Holbeach United Football Club
- Nickname: The Tigers
- Founded: 1929
- Ground: Carters Park, Holbeach
- Capacity: 4,000 (200 seated)
- Chairman: Peter Warrington
- Manager: Callum Lawe
- League: Eastern Counties League Division One North
- 2024–25: Eastern Counties League Division One North, 8th of 20
Home colours	Away colours

Holbeach United Football Club is a football club based in Holbeach, Lincolnshire, England. They are currently members of the Eastern Counties League Division One North and play at Carters Park.

== History ==
The club was established in 1929 and joined the King's Lynn League, before playing in the Spalding and Boston leagues. They joined Division Two of the Peterborough & District League in 1936, and were promoted to Division One in 1938. They were Division One runners-up in 1945–46 and moved up to the United Counties League. When the league gained a second division in 1950, Holbeach became members of Division One and were runners-up in 1953–54.

In 1955 Holbeach were one of four clubs to apply for the three vacant places in the Eastern Counties League; although they were the one to miss out in the vote, another club resigned from the league and a further vote on Holbeach's candidacy saw member clubs vote 11 to 5 to accept them. After seven seasons on the league the club joined the Midland League in 1962. However, after finishing second-from-bottom of the league in 1962–63, they were not re-elected in dropped back into Division One of the United Counties League. The club were runners-up in their first season back in the league and won the League Cup in 1964–65. They were runners-up again in 1968–69. Division One was renamed the Premier Division in 1972, and the club were runners-up again in 1973–74.

The 1982–83 season saw Holbeach reach the first round of the FA Cup for the first time; drawn at home to Third Division Wrexham, the match was moved to London Road in Peterborough, with the visitors winning 4–0. In 1989–90 they won the Premier Division for the first time, also winning the League Cup and Benevolent Cup, the first time a club had won all three UCL trophies in a single season. However, only two seasons later they finished second-from-bottom of the division. They were Premier Division runners-up in 2001–02 and won the division the following season. The club won the Lincolnshire Senior Trophy in 2011–12, and the following season saw them retain the Trophy and win the league for a third time. They won the Trophy again in 2017–18.

When the United Counties League was reorganised in 2021, Holbeach were placed in the Premier Division North. They finished bottom of the division in 2021–22 and were relegated to Division One North of the Eastern Counties League.

== Ground ==
Holbeach have played at Carters Park since their establishment. The site was bequeathed to the town in the mid-1920s by a man named Carter. The ground was originally shared with the local cricket club, meaning that it only had three permanent sides. However, after the cricket club folded, the fourth side was fenced off. A stand was built in the late 1930s and a covered area to its left was also built and later became known as the "pig pen". Covered standing areas were built using Anderson shelters. However, both were later demolished. A new seated stand was opened in 2005. The ground currently has a capacity of 4,000, of which 200 is seated and 450 covered.

The ground's record attendance of 4,094 was set on 28 September 1955 for an FA Cup first qualifying round replay against local rivals Wisbech Town.

== Honours ==
- United Counties League
  - Premier Division champions 1989–90, 2002–03, 2012–13
  - League Cup winners 1989–90
  - Benevolent Cup winners 1989–90
  - Division One Cup winners 1964–65
- Lincolnshire Senior A Cup
  - Winners 1983–84, 1984–85, 1986–87, 1994–95, 2002–03
- Lincolnshire Senior B Cup
  - Winners 1957–58
- Lincolnshire Senior Trophy
  - Winners 2011–12, 2012–13, 2017–18

== Records ==
- Best FA Cup performance: First round, 1982–83
- Best FA Trophy performance: Second qualifying round, 1969–70, 1971–72
- Best FA Vase performance: Fifth round, 1988–89, 2014–15
- Record attendance: 4,094 vs Wisbech Town, FA Cup first qualifying round replay, 28 September 1955

== See also ==
- Holbeach United F.C. players
- Holbeach United F.C. managers
