= Deeping Rangers F.C. =

Association football club in England

Coordinates: 52°41′19″N 0°18′20″W

Deeping Rangers
- Full name: Deeping Rangers Football Club
- Nickname: Rangers
- Founded: 1966; 60 years ago
- Ground: The Haydon Whitham Stadium; Towngate East, Outgang Road; Market Deeping
- Capacity: 2,000 (164 seated)
- Chairman: Richard Knighton
- Manager: Liam Hook
- League: United Counties League Premier Division North
- 2025–26: United Counties League Premier Division North, 16th of 20
- Website: http://www.deepingrangersfc.co.uk/
Home colours

Deeping Rangers Football Club is a football club based in Market Deeping, Lincolnshire, England. They were established in 1964 and originally played at Maxey Road until 1982, but did not move to Outgang Road until 1985; the move was due to a rent dispute with the landowner. They are members of the United Counties League Premier Division North.

== History ==
The club was formed in 1964 and spent their first two seasons in the Peterborough Sunday League, winning the Division One title at the first attempt and then finishing third in the Premier. In 1966, they switched to Saturday football, winning the Peterborough League Division Three North at the first attempt, and also the Peterborough FA Minor Cup. In 1969 they won the Division Two title and a year later became Division One champions.

The facilities at Rangers' Maxey Road ground were deemed inadequate for Premier Division football. As a consequence, the club found it difficult to hold on to their best players, and the division-winning side dispersed. In 1979 Rangers were relegated to Division Two but they bounced back at the first attempt. That same year saw Rangers lose the use of the Maxey Road ground; they played at the Deepings Leisure Centre until moving to their own ground in Outgang Road in 1985.

Rangers finished runners-up in the Peterborough League Division One in 1985 and were duly promoted to the Premier Division. In 1995-96 Rangers were runners-up in the Premier Division, and again in 1998–99, under the management of Mel Landin. This earned the club promotion to the United Counties League.

During these seasons, Deeping Rangers developed a reputation for finding and developing excellent young players. Their most notable alumni include Malcolm Christie (who moved to Derby County and then Middlesbrough) and Ben Wright (who later played for Viking Stavanger in the UEFA Cup and was also on the books of football league club Lincoln City).

In their debut season in the United Counties League, Rangers almost pulled off a promotion double, narrowly missing out on the runners-up slot in the final game of the season. That year saw the installation of floodlights at Outgang Road, which made the club eligible to enter more cup competitions. In 2000–01, manager Chris Beckett took Rangers into the Premier Division by way of the Division One runners-up spot, to accompany the club's first success in the Lincolnshire Senior Cup "B".

Rangers made an immediate mark in the Premier Division, finishing tenth after their first campaign. In 2001-02 Rangers made their debut in the FA Vase followed a year later their first ever FA Cup match. The club finished that season fifth in the Premier Division.

The club had a succession of managers in the following seasons, and mixed fortunes on the pitch. However, for the start of the 2006–07 season, Deeping Rangers appointed Tuncay Korkmaz as manager. The club won two matches in the FA Cup and set a League record by playing 28 consecutive undefeated league games. The run was ended by a 1–0 defeat at the hands of Yaxley. As a result, Rangers led the league by twelve points in February 2007, and went on to win the Premier Division championship for the first time. Not surprisingly, Korkmaz was named the League's Manager of the Year. The following season was a time for consolidation, but the club has the stated ambition to win the UCL Premier Division title again and join near neighbours Stamford at a higher level of football.

== Rivals ==
Deeping Rangers’ principal local rival is Bourne Town, their Lincolnshire neighbours seven miles away. In 2006, Rangers reached the final of the Lincolnshire Senior Cup 'A' for the first time, losing 1–0 to Bourne Town, but since then the bragging rights have been firmly in Rangers’ grasp, especially at the start of the 2008–09 season, when Rangers took eleven goals off their rivals in three games without reply. Rangers also have healthy rivalries with neighbouring UCL clubs Blackstones (based 10 miles away in Stamford), Boston Town, and also Holbeach United.

== Stadium ==
The club shares a site on the northern edge of Market Deeping, close to the recently completed Deepings bypass on the A16, with the local cricket and tennis clubs. All the clubs have joint use of the sports and social club at the centre of the site, which was completed in 1999.

The main stand on the first-team pitch cost £33,000 and took three years to complete. Minor modifications were made during the 1999 close season to comply with UCL regulations. In summer 2000 floodlights were erected following a successful fund raising appeal. These enable the club to comply with FA requirements for grounds at higher levels on the pyramid and also make Rangers eligible for cup competitions where floodlights are mandatory. In 2002 turnstiles were acquired from Wembley Stadium and these now form the centrepiece for a new ground entrance. The official opening was at the 2004 FA Cup-tie against Glapwell, when the crowd was swelled by a display at Outgang Road which featured the actual FA Cup itself. During summer 2005, the main stand was refurbished adding seats bought from Highfield Road, the former ground of Coventry City prior to their move to the Ricoh Arena.

== Records ==
- Best league position: 1st, United Counties Premier Division, 2006–07
- Best FA Cup Performance: Second Qualifying Round, 2011–12, 2015–16, 2017–18, 2019–20
- Best FA Vase Performance: Fifth Round, 2018–19
- Record attendance: 696 v Kidderminster Harriers, FA Cup, 16 September 2017

== Managerial history ==
Name	Nat	From	To	Record						
Name	Nat	From	To	P	W	D	L	F	A	Win %
Robert Thurlow										
Mel Landin										
Chris Beckett										
Paul Kirk			9 April 2004							
Vince Adams	(England)	9 April 2004	11 March 2006							
Pat O'Keeffe		16 March 2006	23 April 2006							
Tuncay Korkmaz	(Turkey)	15 May 2006	30 April 2009							
Patrick Rayment	(England)	25 May 2009	26 October 2010	69	32	9	28	112	113	46.38%
Tuncay Korkmaz	(Turkey)	28 October 2010	10 May 2015	137	75	19	43	332	212	54.74%
Michael Goode	(England)	1 June 2015	1 April 2020							

== Current first-team squad ==
Player	Number	Position
(England) Vacant		Manager
(England) Chris Lenton		Coach
(England) Tyler Key		Goalkeeper
(England) Tom Smith		Defender
(England) Kyle Rowell		Defender
(England) David Burton-Jones		Defender
(England) Spencer Tinkler		Defender
(England) Will Moxon		Defender
(England) Luke Hunnings		Midfield
(England) Matt Sparrow		Midfield
(England) Cal Davies		Midfield
(England) Dan Dougill		Midfield
(England) Liam Hook		Midfield
(England) Ryan Lennon		Midfield
(England) Joe Cole (On Loan from Peterborough Sports)		Striker
(England) Jonathan Lockie		Striker
(England) Sam Mulready		Striker
(England) Josh Moreman		Striker

== Executive committee ==
Chairman	Richard Knighton
Secretary	Austin Goldsmith
Treasurer	Jo Nuttall
Head Groundsman	Dave Holmes
Commercial Manager	Stuart Benson
Media	Vacant
1st Team Manager	Liam Hook
Reserve Team Manager	Matt Atkins
Physio	Tom Murchington
Fixture Secretary	Robin Crowson

== Former players ==
1. Players that have played/managed in the football league or any foreign equivalent to this level (i.e. fully professional league).
2. Players with full international caps.
3. Players that hold a club record or have captained the club.

- (England) Malcolm Christie - (1996–1997)
- (England) Ben Wright - (Youth Player)
- (England) Ryan Semple - (2008–09)
